= List of Runaways story arcs =

Runaways is an American comic book series created by Brian K. Vaughan and Adrian Alphona for Marvel Comics. The series debuted in April 2003. It has covered 13 story arcs, and is currently in its fourteenth. Runaways has frequently been collected in digest-sized books, which led to booming sales. Series creator Vaughan wrote the entire first volume and most of the second, which was continued and ended by Joss Whedon. Rainbow Rowell currently runs the series.

Runaways is frequently praised for being a simple story while being set in the typically complex and twisting Marvel Universe. While it was initially intended to be a six-part miniseries, the popularity of "Pride & Joy" and new ideas from writer Vaughan allowed it to grow into a regular monthly Marvel title, Runaways. Runaways has subsequently won several comics awards, including the 2006 Harvey Award for Best Continuing or Limited Series.

== The Brian K. Vaughan era ==
Series' creator Brian K. Vaughan's tenure on the series ran from April 2003 to 2007. "Pride & Joy" was launched in 2003 as a part of Marvel's Tsunami imprint, the goal of which was to attract new readers, particularly young readers and the manga audience. The imprint was unsuccessful, and "Pride & Joy" (and the series Runaways that continued it) was one of the very few series from that imprint to continue being published and to do well in sales.

In Vaughan's original pitch for the series, Karolina Dean was originally called Leslie. This name would eventually be given to the character's mother. Her parents were originally real estate agents, as opposed to famous actors. Molly was one of the few Runaways to actually keep the name she had in Vaughan's original proposal; she is named after Vaughan's younger sister, Molly Hayes Vaughan. However, in the original pitch for the series, Molly's parents were Hollywood actors. This would eventually become the cover story of Karolina's parents. Also, Molly's sibling-like relationship with Chase was originally supposed to be with Gert. Molly was supposed to be thirteen years old in the original pitch instead of eleven. Nico Minoru was called Rachel Messina. Her parents were still magicians, but posed as wealthy antique dealers; this cover story was ultimately used for Gert's time traveling parents. Nico's source of power was not originally going to be her mother's Staff, but Robert Minoru's spellbook. Chase was originally called John, and Gert was called Gertie. Originally, Gert was meant to give Molly the name "Bruiser". The character of Catherine Wilder was originally designed to look like singer-songwriter Sade.

=== Pride & Joy ===
- Originally published in: Runaways #1-6 (April 2003 - September 2003)
- Creators: writer Brian K. Vaughan, artist Adrian Alphona

Nico, Gert, Chase, Karolina, Molly, and Alex meet at their families' annual gathering. When they see their parents performing the ritual sacrifice of a teenaged girl, the shocked teenagers vow to turn the tables on their evil parents. Nico steals her mother's mystical Staff of One, Chase finds powerful gauntlets and x-ray goggles, Karolina learns she is an alien, Molly finds out she is a mutant and Gert inherits a genetically engineered dinosaur who she can mentally control. In order to get their children back, the Pride frame them for the murder of the innocent girl they had sacrificed. The runaways retreat to a hideout they call "the Hostel". Vaughan has claimed that he had only planned to create "Pride & Joy" to be set for six months (six issues), but because of the popularity of the series, Marvel decided to continue issuing it on for a monthly basis.

=== Teenage Wasteland ===
- Originally published in: Runaways #7-10 (October 2003 - January 2004)
- Creators: writer Brian K. Vaughan, artist Adrian Alphona

While stopping a robbery, the Runaways encounter a boy named Topher, who claims his parents forced him to aid them in the robbery. Deciding he is one of them, the group takes him back to the Hostel; the innocent Topher, however, reveals himself as an evil vampire and attempts to "turn" Nico by biting her, but Alex manages to rescue her and the two rekindle their relationship. Topher then goes after Karolina, but after a bite of her solar-infused blood, Topher explodes. Alphona's artwork was positively received. Along with Christina Strain's handling of lights, shadows and atmosphere, it was "far more effective in this volume than in the last". Manga Punk.com gave this arc (along with the next) a double rating of 9/10.

=== Lost and Found ===
- Originally published in: Runaways #11-12 (February 2004)
- Creators: writer Brian K. Vaughan, guest-artist Takeshi Miyazawa
- Guest appearances: Cloak and Dagger

Former runaways Cloak and Dagger (informed that the teenagers had "kidnapped" Molly) arrive in Los Angeles to confront the runaways. While Cloak arrests the four older kids, Gert and Molly are finally given the chance to get into battle. Upon battling Cloak and Dagger and informing them of the real truth, the two superheroes promise to contact the Avengers to help the runaways take down the Pride; a mole in the Runaways, however, tips off the Pride. Catching up with the vigilantes, the Pride telepathically removes all memory of the meeting from Cloak and Daggers' heads, so they do not remember the Runaways.

=== The Good Die Young ===
- Originally published in: Runaways #13-17 (March 2004 - July 2004)
- Creators: writer Brian K. Vaughan, artist Adrian Alphona
- Guest appearances: Captain America

The origin of the Pride is revealed, along with another revelation: the Hayes and the Deans plan on murdering the rest of the Pride in order to inherit a valuable gift by the Pride's benefactors, an ancient race of mythical giants called the Gibborim. The Runaways engage the Pride in battle and succeed in disrupting a spiritual ceremony, but in the end, Alex dies after outing himself as a traitor. When the Gibborim go on a rampage, the Runaways manage to leave alive, though the Pride themselves end up in the final explosion. Just when the Runaways escape, Captain America arrives to apprehend them.

=== Eighteen ===
- Originally published in: Runaways #18 (August 2004)
- Creators: writer Brian K. Vaughan, artist Adrian Alphona
- Guest appearances: Captain America, brief one-shot of Vision

With their parents dead, Social Services separates the Runaways. Three exhaustive months after the destruction of the Pride, Karolina organizes a reunion, and the team heads off to an Avengers storage complex to retrieve Old Lace. The teenagers decide, rather than return to their new lives, to stay together and uphold a strong distrust towards adults. Although it was announced that Runaways would end with this issue, it was hinted that the series would come back again.

=== True Believers ===
- Originally published in: Runaways #1-6 (February 2005 - July 2005)
- Creators: writer Brian K. Vaughan, artist Adrian Alphona
- Guest appearances: Wrecking Crew, Excelsior (Turbo, Darkhawk, Chamber, Lightspeed, Ricochet, Phil Urich, Rick Jones), Ultron, Armor, Doctor Doom

After a five-month hiatus, the Runaways fight the villains of Los Angeles attempting to fill the Pride's void. A future version of Gert travels back in time to warn the group that a boy named Victor Mancha will grow up to become "Victorious", the greatest villain of all time; before she dies, she warns them to kill Victor before he becomes too powerful. At the same time, a group of former teenage superheroes (called "Excelsior") are promised a $1,000,000 grant from a mysterious benefactor if they successfully detain the Runaways. The Runaways subdue Victor and are later shocked to discover that he is a cyborg created by Ultron. With the help of Excelsior, the Runaways defeat Ultron, and Victor joins them, having nowhere else to go. After the battle with Ultron, Excelsior discovers its benefactor is Rick Jones. The story arc ends with the reveal that Chamber is a fraud, and implies him to be a resurrected Alex Wilder.

=== Star-Crossed ===
- Originally published in: Runaways #7-8 (August 2005 - September 2005)
- Creators: writer Brian K. Vaughan, guest-artist Takeshi Miyazawa
- Guest appearances: Swarm

Karolina outs herself as a lesbian, and reveals she harbors romantic feelings for Nico, but Nico turns down Karolina's advances. As Karolina attempts to cope with the rejection, a Skrull named Xavin lands in Los Angeles and tells Karolina that he is her fiancée, due to an agreement between both their parents. Xavin informs Karolina of the fifteen-year-long war between their races, and insists that their marriage is the only way to enforce peace. Although Karolina initially declines on the basis that she is homosexual, Xavin shape-shifts into a female form. Karolina, finally agreeing, leaves her friends behind and departs with Xavin.

=== East Coast/West Coast ===
- Originally published in: Runaways #9-12 (October 2005 - January 2006)
- Creators: writer Brian K. Vaughan, artist Adrian Alphona
- Guest appearances: New Avengers (Captain America, Spider-Man, Wolverine, Iron Man, Luke Cage, Spider-Woman, She-Hulk), Cloak and Dagger

Cloak, whose memories of the Runaways are restored, convinces the Runaways to travel with him to New York City and help solve a crime: someone posing as Cloak has used Mutant Growth Hormone to attack Dagger. When Chase and Nico end up in a dangerous situation with a drug dealer, Chase bluffs his way out. A relieved Nico kisses Chase - who outright rejects her by saying Gert is his girlfriend, and the only thing keeping him "good". Gert and Victor run into Spider-Man, but Nico knocks him out because Spider-Man is an adult and an Avenger. Meanwhile, after Wolverine scares Molly she punches him through a building. In the end, the Runaways defeat Dagger's attacker, and they return home. Meanwhile, someone (implied to be a resurrected Alex) says that one of them is about to die.

=== Dead Ringers ===
- Originally published in: Runaways #13 (February 2006)
- Creators: writer Brian K. Vaughan, artist Adrian Alphona

During a super-human fight with "a dragon lady", Molly Hayes is knocked unconscious, and washes up down into a sewer system. After waking, she finds that she has been "recruited" by the Provost, who runs a crime ring that uses children to commit thefts. With much strategics, Molly leads her classmates into a defeat of the Provost. Although Molly invites them to join the team, all disagree - saying they would all go to their families. After going home, Molly has a dream that shows her deepest desire: to go home with her parents.

=== Parental Guidance ===
- Originally published in: Runaways #14-18 (March 2006 - July 2006)
- Creators: writer Brian K. Vaughan, artist Adrian Alphona

As it turns out, it was not a resurrected Alex Wilder - it was a much younger version of Geoffrey Wilder, Alex's late father. After Victor has a nightmare about killing his friends under Ultron's influence, Chase confesses to being jealous of Victor, someone his parents would have loved. Nico tells Gert she wishes that Gert will become the leader, if something happens. The teenagers go to stop a crime in the middle of the night, but discover the younger Geoffrey Wilder and a new version of the Pride. In a twisted turn of events, the New Pride takes control of Victor, Gert finds out that Nico kissed Chase, and the New Pride kidnaps Molly. Before they can rescue Molly, they have to repair the Leapfrog - in this period, the Runaways' personal issues begin to get to them: Molly's absence, Gert breaks up with Chase, and Nico learns that the New Pride is getting their information through Victor (much to his shock). Just as the group breaks into a full-blown explosion, Karolina Dean returns to stop the fight.

After telling the team why she and Xavin have returned to Earth, Victor finds out that the new Pride has been using him as a spy cam, and finds that the broadcast was coming from the Minoru Summer Home. Xavin asks the team if she can help. The team goes arrives at the Minoru Summer Home and finds the new Pride have moved out and the weapons cabinet is empty. The Runaways find the New Pride at the Griffith Observatory and a fight starts, but instead of the killing Molly, in the end, Geoffrey Wilder kills Gert. The New Pride, who'd been tricked by Wilder the entire time learn the truth about his intentions. Nico uses the Staff of One spell "Forget" to send Wilder back to his time, with his memory lost. In the present day, Chase runs away.

=== Dead Means Dead ===
- Originally published in: Runaways #19-21 (August 2006 - October 2006)
- Creators: writer Brian K. Vaughan, guest-artist Mike Norton

As the Runaways deal with the aftermath of Gert's death, an elderly shopkeeper manages to obtain a magic talisman belonging to Nico's parents. After claiming he just wants things to "go back to the way they used to be", transforms into a giant rampaging monster and attacks Los Angeles. Meanwhile, Chase "hires" Lotus (from "the New Pride") to help him resurrect Gert, by exchanging her soul to the Gibborim for Gert's - in the end, he pulls back. The Runaways learn of the shopkeeper's past; how he could not get over the death of his wife and was letting his pain out on the city. As the battle goes out of control, Xavin takes the appearance of the old man's dead wife, and Nico casts a spell to give Xavin her voice. Together, the two are able to calm the monster and return him to his human form. Chase reunites with the other Runaways at the hostel and looks at Gert's portrait longingly, thinking of the deal he let go.

=== Live Fast ===
- Originally published in: Runaways #22-24 (November 2006 - January 2007)
- Creators: writer Brian K. Vaughan, artist Adrian Alphona
- Guest appearances: Iron Man, S.H.I.E.L.D.

In the last arc featuring the creative team of Brian K. Vaughan and Adrian Alphona, Xavin expresses confusion about her identity to Karolina, and Chase learns from the Gibborim that the time during which he can resurrect Gert is short. Chase tells Nico that he intends to sacrifice himself on Gert's behalf, and shuts down Victor when he tries to intervene. He takes the Staff of One and leaves. Molly, hears a voice that tells her to alert the others, and they follow Chase, using a urine trail that Old Lace leaves for them. Molly believes the voice to belong to Gert.

The team finds the end of the trail behind a donut shop and leaves Molly behind with Victor. A weak Karolina, a Staff-less Nico and Xavin the realm of the Gibborim, only to find that the giants will not accept Chase as a sacrifice. Apparently, his self-sacrifice was not considered "innocent", and instead the giants move to consume Nico. As all hope becomes lost, a conscious Victor and Molly enter the realm of the Gibborim to save Nico. Without their sacrifice, the Gibborim slowly fade to their deaths. As the team returns to the Hostel, they notice their security has been breached. Xavin realizes that she did not make the group invisible when they left; subsequently, Iron Man greets the children with a squad of S.H.I.E.L.D. Agents. In another reality, the Gibborim come face to face with the person who alerted Molly to Chase's plans in the first place: Alex Wilder.

== The Joss Whedon era ==
When Brian K. Vaughan told Runaways editor Nick Lowe that he wanted to leave the title, Lowe had begged earnestly for Vaughan to stay, but Vaughan had already decided to leave Runaways at the top of its game. Finally, Lowe accepted Vaughan's departure and asked longtime Runaways-fan Joss Whedon to write an arc. Although Whedon had originally declined, he accepted the following week. According to Whedon, his decline from before had been "eating away at him", and after talking to Vaughan all weekend about the series, Whedon had accepted. Vaughan had helped hand-pick Whedon. Whedon had long since been a fan of the series, and even wrote a fan letter which has since been collected in the Runaways vol. 1 hardcover, where he begged Marvel to continue the series after learning it might have ended at issue #18.

=== Dead End Kids ===
- Originally published in: Runaways #25-30 (April 2007 - June 2008)
- Creators: writer Joss Whedon, artist Michael Ryan
- Guest appearances: Kingpin, Punisher

After escaping Iron Man and S.H.I.E.L.D., Nico, Victor, Chase, Molly, Karolina and Xavin arrive in New York City. After a brief run-in with Wilson Fisk (the former "kingpin" of crime in NYC) and the Punisher, the Runaways steal an artifact belonging to the late Gertrude Yorkes's parents. In a twisted turn of events, the Runaways escape to 1907 New York. Much to their shock, the Runaways are horrified to learn that the Yorkes themselves lived during this time, leading a super-powered group called the Sinners. The Runaways separate all over 1907 New York, looking for a new artifact to bring themselves to the present; it is at this point where Molly meets Klara Prast, an abused girl her age with an ability to control plants.

Nico becomes kidnapped by her great-grandmother, "the Witchbreaker", while Chase steals the Yorkes' time machine and disappears. Victor falls in love with a carefree girl named Lillie, and invites her to join them back in the present. However, the group the Runaways have been staying with ("the Street Arabs") are being targeted to death by the Sinners. This leads to a full-scale war in the streets of 1907 New York. Nico, who'd been trained by the Witchbreaker returns, more powerful than ever with a new Staff, along with Chase and his new Fistigon gloves. Right before the Runaways return to the present, Lillie tells Victor she cannot leave her home, much to his angst. Klara Prast, however, does join them.

Marvel editor Nick Lowe called the scene of Victor and Lillie in the sky as his favorite moment of 2007.

== The Terry Moore era ==
Terry Moore was announced to take over the series during summer 2006. Moore had not read of Runaways until the job offer came up; upon asking his son to read the entire series, Moore "fell in love" and describes the characters with great detail and passion.

Humberto Ramos's incarnations of the Runaways differs greatly from those of previous artists Adrian Alphona, Mike Norton, and Michael Ryan. For Karolina, he used his personal opinion to draw her, deliberately breaking style with the previous artists for the benefit. His drawing of Nico was meant to look sexy. As for Chase, he modeled him into a typical "big blond hunk of California surfer", because he should be "the muscle in the team."

Ramos regularly went onto Yahoo! Shopping, looking for the latest ideas in fashion for Molly and Klara's Hannah Montana-inspired clothes. Xavin's gender is to be determined by the way the story progresses, Victor remains more or less the same, but Old Lace appears much than previous incarnations. Moore's first arc introduced the last of the Majesdanians, vaRikk, deHalle, vaDanti and the general vaDrann.

=== Dead Wrong ===
Humberto Ramos's incarnation of the Runaways on Runaways #7. In the actual cover, Xavin is removed from it.

- Originally published in: Runaways #1-6 (August 2008 - January 2009)
- Creators: writer Terry Moore, artist Humberto Ramos

Nico, Chase, Victor, Karolina, Molly, Xavin, Old Lace and Klara return to Los Angeles after finding a new hiding place at Chase's parent's former Malibu home. Chase gets a job at a radio station, and befriends radio shock-jock Val Rhymin, who murders the station manager in order to become in charge. Meanwhile, the remaining Majesdanians have arrived, with the desire to hunt Karolina down for the problems caused on their planet. Using a global spell ("Scatter"), Nico sends several of them over the world, but Victor later realizes that Nico's spell had unintended side-effects: it "scattered" the Runaways themselves. After fighting the Majesdanians, Xavin, shape-shifting into Karolina, leaves with them.

=== Rock Zombies ===
- Originally published in: Runaways #7-9 (February 2009 - April 2009)
- Creators: writer Terry Moore, guest-artist Takeshi Miyazawa

Val Rhymin and a magician named Mother work together to create a spell that will turn all of Los Angeles into zombies. The two of them turn every plastic surgery patient in Los Angeles into zombies, because plastic surgery is one thing most of the citizens partake in. They infuse the spell with a CD, so any plastic surgery patient who listens to the CD will soon turn into a zombie. Los Angeles is soon taken over by zombies, and Nico's magical ability is put to the test. After defeating Val, Mother and the zombies, Nico learns her Staff's developed an ability to defend itself. Zak Edwards of Comic Book Bin rated the first issue 6.5/10. While calling the main plot "very bad", he praised Moore for finally figuring out the characters. Edwards also went as far as to praise Miyazawa's artwork, calling it a "serious upgrade" from Humberto Ramos. Moore mentioned in his blog that Runaways #8 was critically approved.

== The Kathryn Immonen era ==
In February 2009, Christopher Yost was announced to take over Runaways after Terry Moore, co-writing with James Asmus. Sara Pichelli and Emma Rios were also announced to take over as artists. However, Marvel editor-in-chief Joe Quesada revealed on his blog that it was only for one issue. In March 2009, however, Kathryn Immonen was announced to take over Runaways as the permanent writer, while Sara Pichelli remains as artist.

Marvel revealed to viewers of the cable television station G4 show Attack of the Show that Immonen and Pichelli were the new creative team in host Blair Butler's "Fresh Ink" segment. According to Butler, "Marvel promises that one Runaway will die in the new story arc and one might live again." Preview art was also released. Marvel editor Nick Lowe quotes that "It feels so right and so wrong at the same time? To be honest, and no offense to Joss or Terry, I hadn't felt this way since Gert died."

=== Mollifest Destiny / Truth or Dare ===
- Originally published in: Runaways #10 (May 2009)
- Creators: guest writers Christopher Yost and James Asmus, guest artist Emma Rios and artist Sara Pichelli
- Guest appearances: X-Men (Wolverine, Emma Frost, Cyclops, Beast, Colossus, Storm), New X-Men (Rockslide, Anole, Surge, Hellion, Match, Pixie, Mercury, Dust), Loa, Stepford Cuckoos, X-Club, and the Sons of the Serpent.

In "Mollifest Destiny", the Runaways travel to San Francisco after Molly receives Emma Frost's psychic message inviting all mutants to a new home in San Francisco. In a complicated turn of events, Molly is found by one of her parents' enemies, claiming they put him in a coma for seven years. Although Molly originally refuses to believe her parents could be that evil. Wolverine claims that while they may have been evil, they did love her - and that was all that mattered. In "Truth or Dare", the Runaways play a game of truth or dare during a battle with large cobras.

=== Homeschooling ===
- Originally published in: Runaways #11-14 (June 2009 - September 2009)
- Creators: writer Kathryn Immonen, artist Sara Pichelli

Nico, Chase, Victor and Karolina hold a house prom. An outside source manages to send a UAV flying into the Runaways' Malibu home, in the upstairs living room where Klara and Old Lace lie. Nico, Victor and Karolina rush to save Klara and Old Lace - upon arriving at the top, however, it's revealed that Old Lace had shielded Klara, who ends up alive. Old Lace, however, dies. Chase, feeling her death because of their link, falls into a slump and repeatedly mutters an apology for Gert. A short time later, he is run over by a bus while chasing a girl that looks exactly like the late Gert Yorkes.

This story arc is the first in the series to include separate "chapters"; the first issue (issue #11) is entitled "Course Selection". In order to promote the issue, Marvel released several promotional pictures, posters and a plot release all centered on Marvel's statement of "One will die while one will live again". Runaways editor Nick Lowe himself created a "theme song" for the series in order to promote "Course Selection" that was available for download on Marvel.com. A music video was also released. In his review of the issue, Jesse Schedeen of IGN praised Immonen's handle on the characters and Pichelli's pencils, also noting they are the closest depictions to Runaways co-creator Adrian Alphona. After praising the effect of the death, he gave the issue a final rating of 8.6/10.

== The ND Stevenson era ==
In February 2015, it was announced that a new Runaways series would be launching during Marvel's Secret Wars crossover, featuring a new cast set on Battleworld, a parallel universe. The mini series was created by ND Stevenson and Sanford Greene.

=== Doomed Youth ===
- Originally published in: Runaways #1-4 (August 2015 - November 2015)
- Creators: writer ND Stevenson, artist Sanford Greene

A different group of children, who are students at the Victor von Doom Institute for Gifted Youths in Doomstadt, discover that the school's annual "final exams" are actually fatal. They escape but are chased down by senior student Bucky Barnes, under orders from school headmaster Valeria Von Doom. The new team includes alternate versions of Marvel heroes such as Amadeus Cho, Cloak and Dagger, Delphyne Gorgon, Frostbite, Jubilee, Molly Hayes, Pixie, and Skaar.

== The Rainbow Rowell era ==
In May 2017, Marvel released teasers with the characters of the Runaways. In June 2017, it was announced that Rainbow Rowell and Kris Anka would be the new creative team in a revival of the original series. The revival series ended in 2021 with a surprise finale in issue #38, the 100th legacy issue of Runaways. In 2025, Rowell returned to write a five-issue limited series with artist Elena Casagrande, tying into the One World Under Doom storyline. In August 2026, Rowell created What If...? Runaways with Zulema Scotto Lavina, a What If one-shot set in a world where the original Runaways chose not to run away from their parents.

=== Find Your Way Home ===
- Originally published in: Runaways #1-6 (November 2017 - February 2018)
- Creators: writer Rainbow Rowell, artist Kris Anka

=== Best Friends Forever ===
- Originally published in: Runaways #7-10 (March 2018 - June 2018)
- Creators: writer Rainbow Rowell, artist Kris Anka
- Guest appearances: Julie Power, Enchantress, Doombot

=== Am I Still the Same Girl You Used to Know / But What About Klara? ===
- Originally published in: Runaways #11 (July 2018)
- Creators: writer Rainbow Rowell, artist Kris Anka

=== Time After Time ===
- Originally published in: Runaways #12 (August 2018)
- Creators: writer Rainbow Rowell, artist Kris Anka

=== That Was Yesterday ===
- Originally published in: Runaways #13-18 (September 2018 - February 2019)
- Creators: writer Rainbow Rowell, artists David Lafuente, Kris Anka

=== But You Can't Hide ===
- Originally published in: Runaways #19-24 (March 2019 - August 2019)
- Creators: writer Rainbow Rowell, artists Kris Anka, Andrés Genolet

=== Canon Fodder ===
- Originally published in: Runaways #25-31 (October 2019 - March 2020)
- Creators: writer Rainbow Rowell, artist Andrés Genolet

=== Come Away with Me ===
- Originally published in: Runaways #32-38 (October 2020 - August 2021)
- Creators: writer Rainbow Rowell, artists Natacha Bustos, Andrés Genolet, Kris Anka, Adrian Alphona

=== Think of the Children ===
- Originally published in: Runaways #1-5 (June 2025 - October 2025)
- Creators: writer Rainbow Rowell, artist Elena Casagrande

=== What If the Runaways Hadn't Run Away? ===
- Originally published in: What If...? Runaways #1 (August 2026)
- Creators: writer Rainbow Rowell, artist Zulema Scotto Lavina
