= Secret Invasion: Runaways/Young Avengers =

- Cover of the 1st issue

Publication information
- Publisher: Marvel Comics
- Schedule: Monthly
- Format: Limited series
- Publication date: July 26 - October 25, 2008
- No. of issues: 3
- Main character(s): Runaways; Young Avengers

Creative team
- Created by: Brian K Vaughan; Allan Heinberg
- Written by: Chris Yost
- Artist: Takeshi Miyazawa
- Penciller: Takeshi Miyazawa
- Inker: Stefano Caselli
- Letterer: Joe Caramagna
- Colorist: Christina Strain
- Editor(s): Nick Lowe; Daniel Ketchum

Collected editions
- Secret Invasion: Runaways/Young Avengers: ISBN 978-0-7851-2317-0

Secret Invasion: Runaways/Young Avengers is a comic book mini-series tie-in to Marvel Comics' Secret Invasion crossover event. The series serves as a second team-up between the characters from Runaways and Young Avengers. The series was written by Chris Yost with art by Takeshi Miyazawa.

== Production history ==
Secret Invasion: Runaways/Young Avengers bridged the gap between the first and second volumes of the Young Avengers series, which went on hiatus due to writer Allan Heinberg's busy schedule with various television projects and his run on DC's Wonder Woman. It takes place after the events of Runaways v2 #30 and Young Avengers v1 #12.

== Characters ==
- Nico Minoru (witch)
- Karolina Dean (alien)
- Chase Stein (futuristic gauntlets)
- Molly Hayes (mutant)
- Victor Mancha (cyborg)
- Xavin (alien)
- Old Lace (dinosaur)
- Klara Prast (chlorokinetic)
- Patriot (super-human)
- Wiccan (mutant magician)
- Hawkeye (archer)
- Vision (android)
- Hulkling (alien hybrid)
- Stature (size-changer)
- Speed (mutant)

== Plot summary ==
Many months ago, the Skrull Queen Veranke gave Commander Chrell a mission. He was to train her army, and when the day came, he would eliminate the prince. Chrell was obedient and promised to end the prince's life himself. After returning from their adventure in 1907, the Runaways have a new member in tow: Klara Prast. Molly is showing her the sights of modern-day New York City, though Xavin doesn't think that hanging around is a good idea. It turns out that she is right, as they see a Skrull invasion force approaching. Xavin thinks quickly and takes out her friends with a concussive forcefield. Nearby, the Young Avengers spring into action in Times Square, and Chrell is shown footage of the incident. He thinks he's spotted the elusive Dorrek. Xavin, meanwhile, tries to get her friends to safety, but Nico manages to take her down, allowing Victor the opportunity to envelop her in restraining metal. Xavin tries to explain that if the Skrull force is here, then they have already won the war. Now they're just cleaning up. They need to run away. Nico finally wises up and opts to retreat to the Leapfrog with the rest of the crew. The Initiative join the battle in Times Square, whilst Xavin spots Hulkling lying prostrate before Chrell and another Skrull. She acts quickly, creating an explosion so she can whisk Teddy into the sewers. Once down there, she tries to rouse Teddy into consciousness, but they are followed and taken down by three Skrulls who now stand before them.

Many months ago, Xavin was a young student under Chrell's tuition. He listened to tales of a "savior" who would unite the Skrull Empire. He asked Chrell what he thought about this, and Chrell dismissed the story as a fairy tale. He thought Xavin should concentrate on his training. In the present, Xavin is attacked by three Super Skrulls whilst protecting Hulkling from them. She takes a good shot, but before any further punishment can be inflicted, Wiccan and Speed arrive and turn the tables. Xavin informs them that they must get Teddy to safety, but they don't appear to understand her urgency. Meanwhile, the runaways take down a Skrull who attacked them in the Leapfrog, before Karolina and Nico become embroiled in an argument about how Nico allowed Xavin to leave. Above New York, Commander Chrell is informed that someone helped Dorrek escape, and he sends X'iv to deal with them. She fails to kill Teddy, and Xavin helps them escape. Karolina and Nico continue their argument until they see the other Young Avengers on television. Vision is blasted through the head. Nico realizes that Xavin spared them from a similar fate. At that moment, Chrell appears with X'iv and three other Super Skrulls. It doesn't look good.

Many months ago, Xavin trains under Commander Chrell. During the battle, Chrell tells Xavin that if he is to succeed in battle, he should learn his opponent's weakness. Xavin remembers this well. In the present, X'iv catches up with the gang and goes in for the attack. She is well trained in the use of her powers, and manages to handle her opposition with confidence. She is then joined by Chrell who has Nico, Victor, Chase and Karolina helpless. Molly and Old Lace are also both out of the fight. Chrell orders Xavin to kill Dorrek, and her reward will be to live with his Majesdanian tramp anywhere she likes in the universe. Klara panics a little, and in doing so, creates a tree which shoots from the ground, taking Chrell down. Karolina launches an attack. She is furious with Chrell and incredibly protective of her fiancé. X'iv continues to dominate, but when she is ordered by Chrell to kill everyone, Teddy moves in close. He tells X'iv that their God speaks to him, and he said he didn't love X'iv. X'iv's concentration lapses for a moment, and Teddy headbutts her unconscious. Meanwhile, Xavin and Karolina take on Chrell, and Chrell begins to go nova. Sensing extreme danger, Xavin uses just one of her powers; a forcefield with which she envelopes Chrell. Chrell explodes, but Xavin's forcefield holds. The battle is won. Billy tells Nico that they need to get back to their friends in Times Square, and asks her not to follow. Otherwise, who will be there to rescue them when they need it?

== Collected editions ==
Secret Invasion: Runaways/Young Avengers (collects #1-3, Paperback, 96 pages, ISBN 978-0-7851-3266-0 )
