= Pride & Joy (comics) =

Story arc of American comic book series Runaways

- Cover of Runaways: Pride & Joy (2004), trade paperback collected edition Featuring (back) Gertrude, Nico, Alex, Karolina, (front) Chase, and Molly, art by Takeshi Miyazawa
- Publisher: Tsunami (Marvel Comics)
- Publication date: July – November 2003
- Genre: Superhero
- Title(s): Runaways (vol. 1) #1-6
- Main character(s): Runaways; The Pride; Lieutenant Flores

Creative team
- Writer: Brian K. Vaughan
- Penciller: Adrian Alphona
- Inker: David Newbold
- Letterer: Paul Tutrone
- Colorist: Brian Reber
- Editor(s): C. B. Cebulski; Stephanie Moore; Joe Quesada
- Paperback: ISBN 0-7851-1379-7
- Hardback: ISBN 0-7851-3470-0

"Pride & Joy" is a six-issue story arc from the comic book series Runaways (vol. 1), published in issues one through six in 2003 by Marvel Comics' imprint Tsunami, which was created to attract young readers. It was written by Brian K. Vaughan and illustrated by Adrian Alphona. While it was initially intended to be a six-part miniseries, the popularity of "Pride & Joy" and new ideas from writer Vaughan allowed Runaways to grow into a regular monthly Marvel title. "Pride & Joy" has subsequently won several comics awards, including the 2006 Harvey Award for Best Continuing or Limited Series.

Although the Tsunami imprint was unsuccessful, "Pride & Joy" (and the series Runaways that continued it) was one of the very few Tsunami series to do well in sales and to continue being published. The story arc has been critically acclaimed for its simple story set in the typically complex Marvel Universe. Vaughan is known for avoiding the clichés of the superhero genre, locating the group in Los Angeles rather than New York City, where most Marvel Comics superhero titles are set. In order to create an everyday setting and tone, Vaughan included various references to current popular culture, including television series, films, events and celebrities.

The story arc's primary purpose was to introduce the main characters, six children who discover their parents are evil after seeing them murder a girl in a sacrificial ceremony. It centers upon the children's relationships with their parents as the children learn that they themselves have inherited their parents' powers. Once The Pride realizes their offspring have disappeared, they begin to use their considerable influence to track down their sons and daughters. "Pride & Joy" sets up the main concept of the series, which involves children versus their parents.

== Production ==
"Pride & Joy" was launched in 2003 as a part of Marvel's Tsunami imprint, the goal of which was to attract new readers, particularly young readers and the manga audience. Marvel editorial staff agreed to it immediately, prompting Wizard Magazine to name the series as "one of the best original concept from Marvel in thirty years." The imprint was unsuccessful, and "Pride & Joy" (and the series Runaways that continued it) was one of the very few series from that imprint to continue being published and to do well in sales. Writer Brian K. Vaughan has claimed that he had only planned to create "Pride & Joy" to be set for six months (six issues), but because of the popularity of the series and new ideas from Vaughan, Marvel decided to continue issuing it on for a monthly basis. The character of Catherine Wilder was originally designed to look like singer-songwriter Sade.

Several of the characters went through subsequent changes as well. In Brian K. Vaughan's original pitch for the series, Karolina Dean was originally called Leslie, a name which would eventually be given to the character's mother. Her parents were originally real estate agents, as opposed to famous actors. Molly was one of the few Runaways to actually keep the name she had in Brian K. Vaughan's original proposal; she is named after Vaughan's younger sister, Molly Hayes Vaughan, and was supposed to be thirteen years old instead of eleven. However, in the original pitch for the series, Molly's parents were Hollywood actors; this would eventually become the cover story of Karolina's parents. Also, Molly's sibling-like relationship with Chase was originally supposed to be with Gert. Nico Minoru was called Rachel Messina. Her parents were still magicians, but posed as wealthy antique dealers; this cover story was ultimately used for Gert's parents. Nico's source of power was not originally going to be her mother's Staff, but Robert Minoru's spellbook. Chase was originally called John, and Gert was called Gertie. Originally, Gert was meant to give Molly the name "Bruiser."

== Story ==
=== Plot ===
In the first issue of "Pride & Joy," a group of youths unite to fight against their parents, who they then learn are known as "The Pride," a band of villains. At the end of the issue, the youths witness the murder of a girl at the hands of their parents. In the middle of the night, they run away from home and attempt to bring their parents to justice. In the process, the youths realize that they are all inheriting special abilities: Nico Minoru learns she is a witch; Karolina Dean finds out she is an alien; Chase Stein steals his father's futuristic gauntlets, "the Fistigons"; Gertrude Yorkes discovers that she has a telepathic link to a dinosaur hidden by her time-traveling parents; Molly Hayes discovers she is a mutant with super strength; and Alex Wilder, though having no supernatural powers, possesses a prodigal intellect and steals the mystical text that contains The Pride's secrets, becoming the leader of the group. Using the book that contains The Pride's secrets, the youth agree amongst themselves to make up for their parent's sins by fighting crime.

Once The Pride realizes its offspring have disappeared, it begins to use its considerable influence to track down their sons and daughters. "Pride & Joy" sets Runaways for its main concept of the series, which involves children versus their parents.

=== Setting ===
When Vaughan first pitched "Pride & Joy" to Marvel, they immediately accepted it and set Runaways in the Marvel Universe, the main string of story lines that ties Marvel's canonical series. However, unlike most series (which are often set in New York City), Runaways is set in Los Angeles, an unexplored area of the Marvel Universe. This, in turn, marked a significance for the story arc at the time; being a new series, "Pride & Joy" had been expected to take place in New York City. Matt Fraction, a prominent writer for various Marvel Comics series quotes, "It was sort of great to see in Runaways that California was such a blank slate. It was refreshing to watch Brian create this sort of whole cloth." Vaughan's decision prompted Fraction to create a new series to take place in Los Angeles as well. Several notable landmarks in this story arc include Malibu, the Griffith Observatory, the James Dean memorial and Bronson Canyon in Griffith Park. In an interview with Comic Book Resources, Brian K. Vaughan quoted, "I imagine that Angelinos in the Marvel Universe think of super heroes and villains the way that New Yorkers think of Hollywood celebrities. We see them on TV every day, so we know that they exist, but they still seem distant and unreal."

In order to create familiarity with a common-day setting and tone, Vaughan made this story arc include various references to current popular culture, including television series, films, and celebrities such as CSI: Crime Scene Investigation, the Matrix trilogy, and Dr. Phil. Vaughan even makes references to real-world events, such as the Menendez brothers' shootings, the Beltway sniper attacks, Saddam Hussein's hiding and the O. J. Simpson murder case.

=== Style ===
Unlike most authors, Vaughan is known for avoiding the clichés of the superhero genre, locating the group in Los Angeles and not the common New York. "Pride & Joy" struck interest mainly because it does away with the concept of superhero behaviour, such as aliases, uniforms, and team names. At the very end of the story arc, the Runaways (minus Alex) adopt code names, but later drop them. "Pride & Joy" starts off with four females and two males, which is uncommon in the Marvel Universe (most teams have more males). Furthermore, the children never refer to themselves as "the Runaways"; the group remains unnamed. Despite Vaughan's efforts to break down the superhero clichés within Runaways, Marvel's handbooks and website still refer to the characters by their codenames. Also, Vaughan doesn't focus on an actual genre or tone; despite humour, horror and fantasy are common themes and genres, Vaughan mentions that while it may not be a "mature readers book," his style of writing is also dark, challenging and unpredictable.

Penciller Adrian Alphona's style of drawing consists of crisp lines and monotone shading, and as a result, all of the characters are very clear and distinct. Shannon Appelcline of RPGnet Reviews praised Alphona's style of drawing, calling it "attractive and evocative." She did, however, criticize how Alphona sometimes "muddles action sequences a little bit by not drawing important actions with appropriate importance." J. Bowers of Beatbots praised the style Brian K. Vaughan brought to this story arc, comparing it to fellow Marvel Comics series Generation X. Because of this, he gave this story arc 9 out of 10.

=== Characters ===
When the story arc was first introduced, it was frequently praised for its large cast; six children, each with two parents, and several auxiliary characters. Dave Wallace of Comics Bulletin praised author Vaughan's efforts on making sure the main characters' dynamic works well enough that "the occasional stereotypical elements do not detract from the characters too much."

- Alex Wilder, a child prodigy at strategic thinking and planning, leads the team. He is the son of mob bosses.
- Karolina Dean discovers her alien heritage when she removes the bracelet which nullified her powers. She is the daughter of alien invaders.
- Nico Minoru learns she is a witch after her mother jams her mystic Staff of One into her chest, causing her body to absorb it. She is the daughter of dark wizards.
- Gertrude Yorkes discovers her telepathic link to Old Lace, a dinosaur. She is the daughter of time travelers.
- Chase Stein steals his father's flame-generating/manipulating gauntlets called "the Fistigons." He is the son of mad scientists.
- Molly Hayes, the youngest, is a mutant whose powers include super-strength and invulnerability. She is the daughter of telepathic mutants.

== Reception ==
Dave Brennan of "Shaking Through" has called the story arc "spectacular," and said that even though it is aimed at a younger crowd, it is still a "lighthearted and engaging story that any fan of superhero comics can enjoy." He called "Pride & Joy" a promising start for a comic series. The pilot issue of "Pride & Joy" received an A− on "The X-Axis." On many cases, Alphona is also often praised for his style of drawing.

Shannon Appelcline of RPGnet Reviews praised author Brian K. Vaughan for his work on the characters' characterization. With six teens and twelve parents, she cited Vaughan as a strong storyteller for his work on characterizing eighteen crucial characters. She gave the story arc a 4 out of 5, citing that the plotting is above average. She ended her review by citing that "Pride & Joy" was a superb example of the super-hero genre at its best. The conclusion to the story arc received generally positive reviews. The issue sold an estimated 20, 035 copies, a significant improvement from the previous issue. Paul McCoy of Comics Bulletin cited it as "another solid issue, filled with spectacular artwork and very nice character oriented writing." He also went as far as to credit artist Alphona and inker David Yeung's layouts. McCoy praised the detail in the character's designs, from Chases' gloves to the costuming of the Pride.

Dave Wallace of Comics Bulletin, however, cited that "Pride & Joy" felt "pedestrian and lacking in depth." Wallace also called colouring of the early issues flat and static, which made it fairly uninteresting. Despite Molly often being considered a fan-favorite character, the character is nevertheless criticized for being portrayed "far younger than a child who is about to hit puberty," and is compared to acting more along the lines of a six- or seven-year-old as opposed to eleven. Similarly, the character is always considered being "naive."

=== Awards ===
Runaways, the series that grew out of "Pride & Joy," has been nominated for and has won several awards.

- In 2006, the series won a Top Library Award.
- In 2006, series creator Brian K. Vaughan won an Eisner Award, which included his work for Runaways.
- In 2006, the series was nominated for a Shuster Award.
- In 2006, the series won the Harvey Award for Best Continuing or Limited Series.
- In 2007, this particular story arc's digest was nominated for the prestigious Georgia Peach Award.
- Runaways' hardcover version listed on the 2006 American Library Association's YALSA Top Ten Books for Young Adults; it was the only graphic novel to make the list.

== In other media ==
=== TV Series ===
Three seasons of 'Marvel's Runaways' has streamed on Hulu, season 3 being the final season. All 3 seasons are now on Hulu and season 1 is also on Disney+. The show is not the exact story of the initial run of the comic series, but has many references any many plot points from its original source material that are the same.
