= Civil War: Young Avengers/Runaways =

2006 comic book mini-series

- Cover art for Civil War: Young Avengers/Runaways #1. Art by Jim Cheung.

Publication information
- Publisher: Marvel Comics
- Schedule: Monthly
- Format: Limited series
- Publication date: July 26 - October 25, 2006
- No. of issues: 4
- Main character(s): Young Avengers; Runaways; Noh-Varr

Creative team
- Created by: Brian K. Vaughan; Allan Heinberg
- Written by: Zeb Wells
- Artist: Stefano Caselli
- Penciller: Stefano Caselli
- Inker: Stefano Caselli
- Letterer: Cory Petit
- Colorist: Daniele Rudoni
- Editor: Tom Brevoort

Collected editions
- Civil War: Young Avengers & Runaways: ISBN 978-0-7851-2317-0

Civil War: Young Avengers/Runaways (also called Civil War: Young Avengers & Runaways in the collected edition) is a comic book mini-series tie-in to Marvel Comics' Civil War crossover event. The series serves as a team-up between the characters from Young Avengers and Runaways. The series was written by Zeb Wells with art by Stefano Caselli. Young Avengers co-creator Allan Heinberg and Runaways co-creator Brian K. Vaughan served as creative consultants to Wells.

== Production history ==
Civil War: Young Avengers/Runaways bridged the gap between the first and second volumes of the Young Avengers series, which went on hiatus due to writer Allan Heinberg's busy schedule with various television projects and his run on DC's Wonder Woman. It takes place after the events of Runaways v2 #21 and Young Avengers v1 #12, and before Civil War #3

== Characters ==
- Nico Minoru
- Karolina Dean
- Chase Stein
- Molly Hayes
- Victor Mancha
- Xavin
- Old Lace
- Patriot
- Wiccan
- Hawkeye
- Vision
- Hulkling
- Stature
- Speed
- Noh-Varr

== Plot ==
The Runaways intervene in a fight between the Flag-Smasher and S.H.I.E.L.D. Cape-Killers, whose agents damage Victor Mancha. The Young Avengers see the altercation on television, and something about it causes Vision to suffer a seizure. The Young Avengers steal a Quinjet and use Wiccan's magic to find the Runaways. Molly attacks the Young Avengers, thinking that they are working with S.H.I.E.L.D., but the team subdues her (when she becomes drowsy as a side-effect of her powers) and enters the Runaways' base to talk to them. Vision and Victor experience seizures when they are near; Vision explains that this is most likely ultimately due to their both having been created by Ultron.

Noh-Varr, a brainwashed Kree from an alternate reality, is sent by S.H.I.E.L.D. to capture the teenagers. He attacks, breaking Xavin's neck and getting Vision's phase-shifted lower arm stuck in his torso. Noh-Varr's handlers capture Wiccan, Hulkling, Karolina Dean, and Xavin's body and take them to the Cube, a high-security superhuman prison. The remaining members of both teams follow and attempt a rescue. The Cube's warden attempts to dissect Hulkling, but his organs shift to avoid damage. Xavin - who possesses similar shapeshifting powers to Hulkling - is able to right his broken neck and attacks the warden. Victor realizes that Vision's arm, embedded in Noh-Varr's chest, has begun to interface with the alien. Victor overloads him by coming near, as he did with Vision, and Vision becomes able to remove Noh-Varr's psychological conditioning. The two teams part ways and Noh-Varr takes control of the Cube, claiming it to be the capital of the new Kree empire.

== Collected editions ==
Civil War: Young Avengers & Runaways collects Civil War: Young Avengers/Runaways #1-4 (ISBN 978-0785123170). This trade paperback also includes Official Handbook of the Marvel Universe biographies of some of the members of the Young Avengers and the Runaways.

The covers of the four issues of the miniseries can be placed side by side to create a large panoramic poster which is included in the collected edition on two separate pages.
