= Pride and joy =

Pride and Joy may refer to:

== Music ==
- "Pride and Joy" (Marvin Gaye song), 1963
- "Pride and Joy" (Stevie Ray Vaughan song), 1983
- Pride and Joy (Stevie Ray Vaughan video), 1990
- "Pride N Joy", a song by Fat Joe, 2012
- "Pride and Joy", a song by Brandi Carlile from her 2009 album Give Up the Ghost
- "Pride and Joy", a song by David Coverdale and Jimmy Page from their 1993 album Coverdale–Page

== Other uses ==
- "Pride & Joy" (comics), a 2003 Runaways story arc
- Pride & Joy (Vertigo), a 2003 comic book mini-series by Garth Ennis and John Higgins
- Pride & Joy (TV series), a 1995 American sitcom
- "Pride & Joy" (The Crown), a 2016 television episode
- Pride and Joy: Children's Portraits in the Netherlands, 1500–1700, a 2000–2001 art exhibit
