= Val Rhymin =

- Val Rhymin. Art by Humberto Ramos.

Publication information
- Publisher: Marvel Comics
- First appearance: Runaways (vol. 3) #1 (August, 2008)
- Created by: Terry Moore; Humberto Ramos

In-story information
- Alter ego: Val Rhymin
- Team affiliations: Runaways
- Abilities: Magic.

Val Rhymin is a fictional character appearing in American comic books published by Marvel Comics. The character appeared in the award-winning series, Runaways. He was created by author Terry Moore and artist Humberto Ramos, and debuted in Runaways (vol. 3) #1 (August 2008), at the start of the series' third volume. Val first appeared as a worker in a radio station. Although he played a minor role in Runaways's "Dead Wrong" story arc, Val was the main villain in the following story arc, "Rock Zombies".

== Fictional character biography ==
When the Runaways return to Los Angeles, Nico Minoru asks Chase Stein to find a job. When they head to a shopping mall, Chase tries to bag a radio station job with Val Rhymin, his idol. Meanwhile, Val argues with his manager, saying his manager doesn't let him have any freedom. It is now when Val's boss has his seizure, and falls over the mall balcony to the floor below. Before he hits, Klara Prast saves him by making the mall plant life break his fall.

In Rock Zombies Val works with Monk Theppie - treasurer of the California Witchcraft Community - to mix magic spell chanting into a new song. After testing the song on an employee - Lydia - Val broadcasts the song on the radio, transforming everyone who had plastic surgery in L.A. into zombies. Val then orders the zombies to pillage the city and meet back at the Hollywood Bowl. However the Runaways stop his plot with Nico binding Val with a spell. Molly then reverts the zombies back to normal by playing the song backwards.
