= Dead Wrong =

Dead Wrong may refer to:

- "Dead Wrong", a 2001 movie starring Chris Farley that was produced in 1997, but wasn't released until 2001
- "Dead Wrong", a 2012 song by Adler from Back from the Dead
- "Dead Wrong", an episode of Bonanza
- Dead Wrong, a film starring Britt Ekland
- "Dead Wrong", a song by All That Remains from For We Are Many
- "Dead Wrong" (song), by The Notorious B.I.G.
- "Dead Wrong", a song by FEMM from Femm-Isation
- "Dead Wrong", a 2005 song by the Fray from How to Save a Life
- "Dead Wrong" (comics), the first story arc of Runaways' third volume
- Dead Wrong (TV series), a Hong Kong television drama starring Roger Kwok
