= Prast =

Prast is a surname. Notable people with the surname include:

- Alexander Prast (born 1996), Italian alpine skier
- Klara Prast, fictional character
- Manuel Prast (1876–1973), Spanish footballer
- Simon Prast (born 1962), New Zealand director and actor
