= David Newbold =

American comic book artist

David Newbold is a comic book artist. Newbold's first work was in 2004, where he inked an issue of Marvel Comics's series Marvel Age Fantastic Four.

Newbold later became publicly known for his brief tenure on the Marvel Comics' award-winning series, Runaways along with writer Brian K. Vaughan and artist Adrian Alphona. Newbold also inked the Weapon X series. Newbold was born in Leesburg, Virginia in 1976, and was raised in Morgantown, West Virginia, graduating from Morgantown High School in 1994. He attended West Virginia University, and then enrolled in Joe Kubert's Art School in Dover, New Jersey, graduating in 2000.
