= Xavin =

- Xavin, displaying their abilities. Art by Jo Chen.

Publication information
- Publisher: Marvel Comics
- First appearance: Runaways (vol. 2) #7 (August 2005)
- Created by: Brian K. Vaughan; Adrian Alphona

In-story information
- Alter ego: Xavin
- Species: Skrull
- Place of origin: Tarnax VII
- Team affiliations: Runaways
- Notable aliases: Prince Xavin; General Xavin
- Abilities: Cosmic ray manipulation; Shapeshifting; Military training

Xavin is a superhero appearing in American comic books published by Marvel Comics. The character is commonly depicted in association with the Runaways. Xavin is gender-fluid (made more prominent due to their shape-shifting abilities) with seemingly no preference in which pronouns are used for them ("they/them" pronouns are used throughout the article for clarity's sake). They were created by author Brian K. Vaughan and artist Adrian Alphona, and debuted in Runaways (vol. 2) #7. In the publications, Xavin is a Super-Skrull in training. Although Alphona was the series' artist at the time, artist Takeshi Miyazawa first drew the character on print. When Xavin first appeared to the Runaways, they took on the form of a black male, but changed into a black female just for the sake of Karolina Dean, a lesbian whom they were to marry. Xavin is often seen as a male, simply to be "intimidating". Xavin, often called "Xav" for short, is known for their obtuse and warlike personality. They had originally found it hard to fit in with the Runaways due in part to Xavin's constant gender switching and unfamiliarity with Earth values and norms though through proving their loyalty to the group found acceptance. Xavin is the child of the Skrull Prince De'zean.

Xavin was portrayed by Clarissa Thibeaux in the second and third seasons of the Hulu television series Runaways, which is set in the Marvel Cinematic Universe.

== Publication history ==
Xavin first appeared in Runaways (vol. 2) #7 (August 2005), and was created by Brian K. Vaughan and Adrian Alphona. They are introduced as a Skrull prince, the child of De'zean of the Skrull royal family on the planet Tarnax VI, and they are meant to marry Karolina Dean to bring peace to their two warring alien species.

As a member of the Runaways, they appeared in the comic book Secret Invasion: Runaways/Young Avengers, which involves both the Runaways and Young Avengers teams.

In the third volume of Runaways, Xavin is forced to leave the team and is last seen being taken from Earth in Majesdanian custody.

== Fictional character biography ==
=== History ===
When Xavin journeys to Earth to find Karolina Dean, they reveal to Karolina that their parents had one more large secret. The Deans had been exiled from their planet Majesdane for criminal activities. They traveled to Earth where they encountered Xavin's father, Prince De'zean of the Skrulls, who was going to rule the planet. The Deans had stopped the destruction but gave the Skrulls the location of another, more valuable planet: Majesdane. To prove they were not lying, they gave Prince De'zean's child their child's hand in marriage. The Deans had believed that Xavin would die in the new Skrull/Majesdanian war. Xavin later arrived on Earth to marry her and hopefully stop the fifteen-year war between their races. Xavin encountered Karolina shortly after her romantic advances were rejected by Nico Minoru. Xavin tried to convince Karolina to be their bride. He fought and pursued her, in the form of a human male. Karolina revealed that she is not attracted to men and does not want to live a lie. However, Xavin altered their form to that of a human woman and persuaded her to leave Earth with her.

During the wedding ceremony, a fight breaks out between the two races, and Xavin and Karolina barely escape before Majesdane is destroyed. They return to Earth, where they help rescue Molly Hayes from the New Pride. Xavin impersonates Nico and takes a bullet for her, distracting Geoffrey Wilder long enough for Nico to untie Molly and escape. Xavin survives the attack by shape-shifting their organs out of the way.

=== Secret Invasion ===
When the Runaways return from a trip to the past, Xavin learns they are in the most heated phase of the Skrull Invasion. Instead of fighting, they knock out their teammates and attempt a peaceful settlement of the war, reasoning that the Skrulls are "religious extremists". Their attempts at peace fail, and they're informed that the Runaways are targeted for execution. They urge Nico to take the rest of the team and hide, and in a last-ditch effort to halt the invasion, they flee to search for Hulkling, former Skrull King and enemy of the religious extremist Skrulls' Queen, Veranke. They find Hulkling injured, targeted for assassination by Veranke herself. By siding with Hulkling, they are branded a traitor as well.

=== As a fugitive ===
Weeks later, Xavin better adjusted, refraining from insulting Victor and becoming closer to Molly (the only teammate other than Karolina to always refer to Xavin as female). However, Xavin is still more-or-less an outcast to the other members. Like the other Runaways, Xavin is an orphan (they told the group when they first appeared that their parents were dead because of the aliens' war). They also call themselves a runaway when they reveal their identity to Geoffrey Wilder. Xavin joins the group but has trouble adjusting to their new surroundings and getting along with their new teammates, particularly Victor, whom they often offend with condescending remarks about robots. Although they are aggressive and headstrong, Xavin is motivated to protect their new home of their love for Karolina. Xavin usually reverts to the male Skrull form when in battle, insisting that it adds to a more intimidating persona, despite Karolina thinking that it is sexist, yet still spends some time in the female human form as well. However, during their trip to 1907, it was revealed that when they lose control or are under emotional pressure, the female form was the one to which they would revert, which pleases Karolina.

=== Departure ===
In Runaways' "Dead Wrong" story arc, a group of surviving Majesdanians arrives to arrest Karolina. After they repeatedly attack the Runaways, Xavin realizes that the aliens will not stop until they get Karolina. Karolina apparently leaves the group with the Majesdanians, but the Runaways, except Nico, are later shocked to find the real Karolina knocked out. Xavin shapeshifted into Karolina's form and took her place to take all the punishment for their species' war. Kissing Karolina, Xavin whispers their love and departs the group. Their fate is unknown.

== Powers and abilities ==
Xavin, being a Skrull, has the Skrull's natural ability to shapeshift. Xavin was a Super-Skrull in training, meaning they can manifest the powers of the Fantastic Four: Mr. Fantastic's ability to stretch and contort his body into any shape imaginable, Invisible Woman's power to render herself invisible, and the ability to create force fields, the Human Torch's fire-control and flight and the Thing's superhuman strength and resistant rock-like hide. The Super-Skrull Kl'rt is one of Xavin's idols. As stated by Xavin, they are still a Super Skrull in training, so they can only use their Fantastic Four abilities one at a time; at one point, when Xavin was bombarded with high-frequency sounds, they lost control of their powers and burnt up the Griffith Observatory. Finally, in (vol. 3) #2, they used all their powers at once in anger.

=== Personality ===
Xavin is known for their warlike, rash attitude, something that irritates the other Runaways, particularly Victor, towards whom they had a strong animosity towards because being an android, Victor would have been hardwired to cook and clean on their planet. Although Xavin often demonstrates strong, general-type behavior, there are periods when they accidentally show they barely have any more experience than the other Runaways; for example, they once stretched themselves from one building to another just to get to the other side instead of simply creating a force-field bridge, only realizing the alternative after it was pointed out to them by Molly.

== Reception ==
In 2008, Xavin was named the fourth (out of ten) best Skrull characters in an article published on Marvel's official website.

== Gender identity ==
Due to Xavin often changing through their three main forms (human female, human male, and true Skrull form) both characters within the series and fans question the nature of their gender. As a Skrull, a race of shapeshifters, Xavin stated "for us, just changing our gender is no different than changing our hair color", implying that Skrulls have fluid gender identities. When asked by Molly about why they do not stay in female form all the time, Xavin replied that it was simply their nature to do so and does not see a problem in it, though it causes Xavin to start questioning their own nature. Although Karolina does truly love Xavin, even so much as to deny Xavin disguised as Nico due to loyalty, she does become depressed when Nico questions Xavin's true gender. In Civil War: Young Avengers/Runaways, Xavin is mostly male, but female briefly. In (vol. 3) #1, Xavin is only male, but in issue #2, Xavin is only female. Karolina is fixed on the idea that Xavin is female, and that Xavin is not pretending to be a woman, just learning to be human. During an argument with Karolina, Xavin loses control and changes form into their female form, and Karolina takes that to mean Xavin's true form is a female. On his blog, artist Humberto Ramos noted that he was instructed to draw Xavin taking different genders depending on the situation, even when not plot-necessary.

== Relationships with other Runaways ==
Due to their war-like, yet rash attitude, Xavin often irritates the other Runaways. They often believed that Victor was supposed to be hardwired to know everything, due to Victor being a cyborg. In their first appearance, they called Victor a "toy". Xavin met Karolina after Karolina suffered rejection from Nico, her crush, for some time. When Xavin expressed no concern about changing physical appearance from male to female to please her, Karolina began a relationship. Xavin once took the form of Nico to please Karolina, but Karolina rejected them as Nico because they had earned her loyalty and reassured Xavin that she loved them as they are. At times, they still suspect Karolina has lingering feelings for Nico. Later on, during an argument, Xavin subconsciously reverted to their female human form, which both surprised and pleased Karolina, who had earlier expressed some lingering doubts about Xavin's true gender.

Besides Victor, Xavin strongly infuriates Nico and often questions Nico's leadership decisions. Xavin grew to respect Nico's leadership, telling her how much they have learned from her.

== In other media ==
Xavin appears in the second season of Runaways, portrayed by Clarissa Thibeaux, with other actors and actresses occasionally portraying them. This version is a Xartan, a shapeshifting alien who presents as numerous people before adopting a female body. They stowed away on a ship that carried Karolina Dean's biological father, "Jonah", and his family of exiled Gibborim royal magistrates for the purpose of fulfilling an uncertain prophecy that she believes they are a part of that will unite two worlds and bring peace to the universe. In the third season, Xavin leaves Earth alongside Elle Dean, Leslie Dean's newborn daughter.
