= Nico Minoru =

Fictional character

- Nico Minoru on the cover of Runaways #10 (Nov. 2005). Art by Jo Chen.

Publication information
- Publisher: Marvel Comics
- First appearance: Runaways #1 (July 2003)
- Created by: Brian K. Vaughan; Adrian Alphona

In-story information
- Full name: Nico Minoru
- Team affiliations: Runaways; A-Force; Masters of Evil; Midnight Sons; Strange Academy
- Notable aliases: Sister Grimm
- Abilities: Staff of One summoning: Magical teleportation; Magical telekinesis; Magic shielding; Flight

Nico Minoru, briefly known as Sister Grimm, is a superhero appearing in American comic books published by Marvel Comics. Created in 2003 by writer Brian K. Vaughan and artist Adrian Alphona, the character debuted in Runaways #1 (July 2003). Like every member of the original Runaways, Nico is the child of two of the super-powered villains calling themselves "the Pride"; in her case, she is the daughter of dark wizards. Upon finding out, Nico runs away with the rest of the runaways but later discovers that she inherited her parents' magical aptitude. Whenever Nico bleeds, a powerful staff emerges from her chest, called the Staff of One, allowing Nico to bend magic.

After the Runaways are betrayed by one of their own in volume one, Nico reluctantly becomes the de facto leader of her unofficial and nameless superhero team, making her one of the few Japanese-American superheroine team leaders. Nico's trademark is her elaborate and ornate Gothic wardrobe. Nico is a sorceress like her parents and great-grandmother before her and can cast nearly any spell imaginable with her staff. Nico uses her talents to make up for her parents' villainous actions and to prevent anyone from assuming the Pride's place at the top of Los Angeles organized crime.

In the Marvel Universe, she was featured in Avengers Arena and its sequel, Avengers Undercover, which follows the survivors of the thirty day-long deathmatch in Murderworld. Nico is traumatized by those events and temporarily walked away from the Runaways. She later joined Marvel's first all-female Avengers team, A-Force.

Nico's Staff of One responds to verbal commands, but can only respond to any given spell once. If she attempts to cast the same spell twice, the results have unforeseen consequences. To summon the Staff itself, Nico must bleed—as all magic comes with a cost. After working with the Witchbreaker, Nico develops the ability to cast spells without the Staff and upgrades her own abilities. In the wake of her resurrection in Murderworld, Nico jumps up to another power level and even receives a magical arm replacement that can channel supernatural energies more powerful than the Staff. By the relaunch of Runaways vol. 5, Nico's Staff and powers are reverted to its original condition and her magical arm replaced with a normal arm for reasons unknown yet.

Since her debut, Nico has been described as one of Marvel's most notable and powerful LGBT female heroes.

Nico Minoru was portrayed by Lyrica Okano in the Hulu streaming television series Runaways, set in the Marvel Cinematic Universe (MCU). She reprised the role in the 2022 tactical role-playing game Marvel's Midnight Suns. An alternate version of the character appears in the MCU Disney+ animated series Your Friendly Neighborhood Spider-Man, voiced by Grace Song.

== Publication history ==
Nico Minoru first appeared in Runaways #1 (July 2003) and was created by Brian K. Vaughan and Adrian Alphona.

In Brian K. Vaughan's original pitch for the series, Nico was called Rachel Messina. Her parents were still magicians, but posed as wealthy antique dealers; this cover story was ultimately used for Gert's time-travelling parents. Nico's source of power was not originally going to be her mother's Staff, but Robert Minoru's spellbook.

Nico Minoru appeared in Avengers Arena, a new series by Dennis Hopeless and Kev Walker, as well as its sequel, Avengers Undercover.

Nico appears as one of the main characters in A-Force, an all-female Avengers spin-off launched by G. Willow Wilson, Marguerite Bennett, and Jorge Molina during Marvel's Secret Wars crossover.

== Fictional character biography ==
=== The Pride ===
Every year, Nico's parents join five other couples in a charity event; one year, Nico and the other kids spy on their parents. Nico is shocked to discover her father speaking an enchantment, and after witnessing the murder of an innocent girl by their parents ("the Pride"), Nico joins the others in their massive ransack to run away from their parents. While on the run, Nico encounters her parents. Her mother, wielding a large staff with a ball at the end ("the Staff of One"), reveals that she and Nico's father are dark wizards; she then attempts to jam the Staff into Nico's chest. Nico's body absorbs it. After she is later cut by Dale Yorkes' Samurai battle-axe, the Staff re-emerges from her chest, which prompts Nico to use the phrase "Freeze", and freeze Stacey Yorkes. It is revealed that Nico is a witch, and that the Staff only emerges when she bleeds. Sometime after running off, Nico takes on the name Sister Grimm to escape the name her parents gave her, but drops it after a while. After team leader Alex outs himself as the mole and is defeated along with the Pride, Nico is accepted as the group's leader.

=== Mystic Arcana ===
Nico as Sister Grimm on the cover of the limited series, Mystic Arcana. Art by Marko Djurdjevic.

In 2007, the magic-related crossover event Mystic Arcana fills the gap between Runaways #17 and #18, during Nico's brief time at Father Flanagan's Home for Unwanted Goth Kids. The story begins with Nico dressed in a Japanese school girl's outfit, stating that it's perhaps time to let go of the goth trend. She is soon talked into going to a nightclub with her friends, where she meets her parents' old rival Marie Laveau; Laveau seeks revenge on Nico's parents for stealing the Black Mirror, one of the four Cornerstones of Creation. After Laveau explains that she needs Nico's blood to activate the Black Mirror, Nico gives Leveau her blood, while also purging out the Staff of One. The two fight, and Nico easily wins. Nico attempts to bring back Alex Wilder using the Mirror, however the spell fails, the Mirror shatters and the last page of the Darkhold is revealed behind the glass. Laveau takes it and flees, while Nico accepts her place as an outcast with the Runaways.

Artist Dave Sexton revealed Nico was one of the four magic characters chosen for the story arc because each character relates to some elemental themes: Magik represents air and logic, the Black Knight represents the Earth and tools, the Scarlet Witch represents water and emotions, and Nico represents fire and wands. As Nico must deliver blood in order to produce her Staff, fire and sacrifice prove to be similar to Tarot's Minor Arcana suit of "wands". Although C.B. Cebulski wrote the Sister Grimm portion of Mystic Arcana, Runaways-creator Brian K. Vaughan lent some assistance.

=== As a fugitive ===
After being warned of a future threat named Victor Mancha, Nico and the Runaways find and abduct Victor to question him. After Victor's mother is murdered and father, Ultron, is destroyed, Nico invites Victor to become a part of the team, much to the anger of some members, notably Chase. Nico reassures them that she is willing to "rip [Victor's] damn heart out" if necessary. After Chase ties Nico up before he attempts to sacrifice himself to the Gibborim, Nico interprets it as a cry for help and leads the Runaways to intervene to stop Chase's self-sacrifice. The Gibborim instead attempt to take Nico, revealing that Nico's soul is innocent, thus, suitable for the Gibborim's consumption. Victor rescues Nico and the two form a relationship. After defeating the Gibborim, Victor asks Nico what she's willing to do if Chase does something like this again; Nico responds by saying she is willing to "rip [Chase's] damn heart out" if necessary. After returning to their lair beneath the La Brea Tar Pits, Xavin realizes she had publicly exposed their location, drawing the attention of Iron Man and S.H.I.E.L.D. Nico, stepping into her role as a leader, leads the Runaways in a cross-country escape from Iron Man and S.H.I.E.L.D.

=== The Witchbreaker ===
After escaping the authorities, the Runaways head to New York, where Nico anxiously makes a deal with Kingpin. In a twisted turn of events, the Runaways end up time-displaced in 1907 New York, where Nico is kidnapped and brought to a woman named "the Witchbreaker". The Witchbreaker claims she is Nico's great-grandmother, and states she will teach Nico how to withstand more pain and, therefore, wield more magic with better proficiency. She wields a weapon similar to the Staff of One, with more adornments. When reunited with her comrades, a significant development to Nico's abilities is evident, where she is freely able to float, displays more proficiency and confidence in casting spells and able to use a spell with an effect more complicated than most of her others thus far. It is revealed that Nico had obtained the Witchbreaker's Staff. Little more information is given to how Nico and her ancestor's meeting had ended, though the Official Handbook of the Marvel Universe's more recent edition says that Nico had "escaped" her. During this period, Victor falls in love with another girl, corrupting his relationship with Nico.

=== Secret Invasion ===
During the global shape-shifting alien invasion by the Skrulls, Nico and the other Runaways briefly remain in New York after returning from 1907, trusting that "hiding in plain sight" would be sufficient to conceal their own identities and that it would be best if they showed Klara around her city in the future before they returned to Los Angeles. However, to their shock, an armada of Skrull ships attack New York and its civilians. Xavin, trying to fool the invaders into thinking she intends to help them, uses a force field to knock out the Runaways; Nico and Victor are still conscious, however, and they attack Xavin, accusing her of being a traitor. Xavin reveals that she is trying to protect them and convinces them that the Skrulls are too dangerous for them to fight and pleading with them to flee to the Leapfrog. The Runaways eventually unite with the Young Avengers to assist against the invading Skrulls. Nico insists on leading her team to help the Young Avengers continue the fight against the Skrulls, refusing to "run away." However, Wiccan urges her to leave, claiming that if the Young Avengers lose, they will need the Runaways to save them.

=== Dead Wrong/Rock Zombies ===
Nico uses a spell ("scatter") to scatter a group of invading Majesdanians all over the planet. The spell, however, had unwanted side-effects: it emotionally scatters the Runaways. Victor realizes this in time, and Nico spearheads a massive escape from the returning Majesdanians. A short time later, the Runaways realize that having obeyed Nico, they broke the enchantment. Regardless, Xavin shapeshifts into Karolina Dean and leaves Earth, much to the other Runaways' great grief.

Later on, Nico uses the spell "Zombie Not" to turn an army of zombies back to humans; the spell, backfiring, turns the zombies into an actual "zombie knot", thus creating a one large zombie. The Runaways deduce that after the Witchbreaker tortured and trained Nico, Nico's magical abilities have been greatly augmented. Val Rhymin's magician informs Nico that the Staff of One carries tremendous magical ability and Nico, being young, should not use it. The magician steals the Staff from her, only to be killed after the Staff defends itself. A silent Nico takes her Staff back, and warns the other Runaways not to touch it.

=== Dark Reign ===
At the 2009 Emerald City ComiCon, writer Brian Michael Bendis implied that Nico might be one of the magicians sought by former Sorcerer Supreme Doctor Strange, seeing as the search "is not done yet." Although the title went to Brother Voodoo, her image appeared as one of the many candidates the Eye of Agamotto considered to assume the role of the new Sorcerer Supreme.

Nico also makes a non-speaking cameo in Strange #4 (Feb. 2010) as one of the powerful mages Doctor Strange asks to stop using their powers for an hour.

=== Avengers Arena ===
In the series Avengers Arena, Nico is abducted by the villain Arcade and placed on a special island version of Murderworld. The Staff of One has its power drastically reduced for an unexplained reason, preventing her not only from being able to act out against Arcade or the island, but also requiring "dozens of spells" just to successfully grow food to eat. After mounting a frontal attack on Apex and Juston Seyfert's Sentinel, Nico loses the Staff of One when she is dismembered by Chase (now in possession of the Darkhawk armor) and thrown off a cliff. She then crawls to the Staff of One and tries to cast the spell "help", but bleeds out before the Staff can act. The Staff resurrects Nico, using her massive blood loss as a sacrifice to grant her enough power to disarm Death Locket, destroy the Darkhawk armor, and defeat Apex by trapping her underground. Chase returns to his normal self and then helps Nico and Reptil fight Cullen Bloodstone, who had decided to battle X-23 in his unstable Glartrox form. In the ensuing battle, Nara is killed after retrieving Cullen's ring, which would return him to his human form, and Anachronism goes wild. Reptil asks Nico and Chase for help breaking up the fight, but Nico insists she and Chase stay out of it. At Nico's command, Chase then turns into Darkhawk and sucker-punches Reptil as part of some secret plan that he and Nico devised. Chase showed regret at having to attack Reptil. When Chase refuses to let Cammi stop Nico, she breaks his arm and leg, taking the Darkhawk amulet for herself to stop Nico from killing everyone. Cammi gives Chase the amulet again when Apex attacks the remaining teens on Murderworld. Soon after, Death Locket stops the fight by killing Apex and everyone is able to escape Murderworld.

=== Avengers Undercover ===
Once news broke about Arcade's kidnappings, Nico and the other Murderworld survivors became infamous. Nico has dyed her hair slightly red and still sports the witch arm she gained in the fight with Apex. She also has the power to teleport and create floating and cloaking spells. To the other Runaways' horror, she and Chase fight during one of Chase's interviews on the talk show, criticizing Chase for breaking their pact of silence, which was made moot when Arcade released video. She then teleported Chase away from the set. However, when Anachronism reveals Bloodstone's gone missing, all the survivors team up to head to Bagalia to find him. On their way in, Nico berates Chase for saying they are "family," pointing out that he only came with them because she made him. Once they find Bloodstone, he reveals that he enjoys life among the villains, and the others, minus Cammi, start to enjoy it as well. Nico tries to convince Bloodstone to come back with them, but he refuses. Daimon Hellstrom has been helping Cullen control his monster form and he offers to help Nico with her upgraded powers too. When Cammi tries to tell the others to leave, Bloodstone instead has Hellstrom teleport the group to Arcade's latest party so they can confront him. Hazmat uses this opportunity to kill Arcade. Baron Zemo then tell them they have two choices, join him or be returned to the surface to be punished by S.H.I.E.L.D.. Nico comes up with a third option, pretend to join Zemo and destroy his organization from the inside. She works closely with Hellstrom to strengthen her magical powers. Eventually they unwittingly feed to Avengers information planted by Zemo in order to trap the Avengers in Bagalia and then steal S.H.I.E.L.D.'s Helicarrier. Cammi stops Zemo and reveals Arcade is alive. Since only a body double was killed, S.H.I.E.L.D. drops any charges against the teens. She is last seen enjoying some vacation time on a lake with the rest of the group in the final issue of the series.

=== A-Force ===
Following the Secret Wars storyline, Singularity awakes in the primary Earth-616 universe and quickly spots Carol Danvers but Danvers does not recognize her. Unbeknownst to Singularity, she is being pursued by a similar being named Antimatter. While Danvers confronts Antimatter, Singularity flees to New York City. With Antimatter still in pursuit, Singularity locates She-Hulk, who does not remember her either, and asks for help. As the pair fight Antimatter, Medusa arrives with reinforcements and takes Singularity into custody. After Antimatter kills one of Medusa's soldiers, she releases Singularity and teleports Antimatter to the moon. Realizing that physical attacks are having little effect on Antimatter, Singularity transports She-Hulk, Medusa and herself to Japan to seek the help of Minoru. When Antimatter returns, Minoru casts a spell that causes him to be temporarily unmade. The spell buys the women some time during which Danvers suggests that Antimatter maybe susceptible to intense levels of light particles. They then travel to Miami to recruit Dazzler just as Antimatter remerges. Dazzler hits Antimatter with everything she has to no avail but it gives Danvers time to activate a containment device that she designed. When Antimatter overloads the device, Singularity has Minoru remove Antimatter's tracking ability and transports the team to The Peak. As Antimatter eventually reaches The Peak, She-Hulk orders Singularity to stay behind while the rest of the team leaves to parley with Antimatter. After talks fail, Antimatter fatally wounds Dazzler and in turn She-Hulk decapitates Antimatter. Angered by Dazzler's death, Singularity leaves to confront a recovered Antimatter one-on-one. As Singularity fights Antimatter, Dr. Tempest Bell, The Peak's lead scientist, develops a bomb capable of destroying Antimatter but denoting it will also kill Singularity. She-Hulk, Minoru and Danvers go to reinforce Singularity, while Medusa places the bomb inside Antimatter. Just as the bomb explodes, a revived Dazzler arrives with a dimensional teleporter and whisks Singularity away from the blast. With Antimatter destroyed, the team celebrates at a diner when Singularity senses a disturbance as remnants of Antimatter tear open portals to other worlds. In Astoria, Oregon, A-Force tracks a dragon from Battleworld named Countess and discover that she is being pursued by an alternate version of Dazzler that belonged to the Thor Corps. A-Force joins Dazzler Thor in combat which causes Countess to retreat. As the heroes wait for Countess's return, Dazzler confides to Dazzler Thor that she has been infected by the Terrigen Mist and is dying. When Countess arrives, she takes control of Minoru who then incapacitates the team. She-Hulk, Medusa, Dazzler, Dazzler Thor, and Danvers awake in a jail cell in Astoria to discover that their powers are gone and the populace under the control of the Countess. After She-Hulk taunts the Countess, she has Minoru turn She-Hulk against the others. As the fight with She-Hulk takes the team away from the city and their powers return, the Countess has Minoru turn their feet into cement shoes and drag them under water. As the team is about to drown, Minoru commands them to breathe. Once out of the water, She-Hulk sends half the team to distract Countess, while the others rescue Minoru. After being rescued, Minoru reveals the true nature of Countess' powers and returns with Dazzler and Dazzler Thor to confront Countess. Minoru convinces Countess to have a change of heart as Dazzler Thor succumbs to the compounded effects that the Terrigen Mist are having on her otherworldly system. After Dazzler Thor's body vanishes, Dazzler warns her teammates that she may suffer a similar fate.

=== Civil War II ===
During the "Civil War II" storyline, after She-Hulk is gravely wounded in a battle with Thanos, Danvers tells Minoru that the Inhuman Ulysses Cain had a vision of her killing a woman named Alice. Refusing to be arrested for a crime that she has yet to commit, Minoru flees to a safehouse in Ouray, Colorado. Unbeknownst to Minoru, the town is under attack from a swarm of giant bugs. Minoru encounters Elsa Bloodstone. Bloodstone informs Minoru that the attack is the result of an infection that is turning the populace into insects and takes her to meet Janine, whose daughter Alice has gone missing during the commotion. Meanwhile, Danvers and Medusa race to find Minoru before Dazzler and Singularity, who disagree with their methods. Danvers and Medusa find Minoru and Bloodstone just before Dazzler and Singularity arrive. After a brief confrontation, they agree to split into two teams: one to find Alice and the other to protect the civilians. While searching for Alice in an abandoned mine, Danvers, Minoru and Bloodstone are attacked by a giant bug. The bug incapacitates Danvers and Bloodstone before telepathically communicating to Minoru that she is Alice and has been inadvertently infecting the townspeople after her transformation. Alice tells Minoru that killing her is the only way to save the people. When Minoru refuses, an infected Bloodstone threatens to kill Danvers. Medusa, Singularity, and an infected Dazzler are overrun by bugs and regroup with the others just as Bloodstone infects Danvers. After Dazzler infects Medusa, Minoru casts a spell to transform Alice back into a human but it does not cure the rest of the populace. Alice explains that she must be killed and Minoru reluctantly casts a death spell on Alice which transforms the infected back into humans. Alice then remerges in her final form and tells A-Force that she is no longer a threat as she now has greater control of her powers. When the commotion is over, Danvers and Minoru continue to disagree over each other's actions but agree to visit She-Hulk together in the hospital.

=== Strange Academy ===
Nico Minoru became a teacher at Strange Academy where she teaches Creative Spellcasting and co-teaches Defense Against Vampires alongside Magik.

== Powers and abilities ==
=== Spellcasting ===
The original Staff of One

Nico, being a witch, uses magic as her weapon. In the early issues, her sole weapon had been the Staff of One, an ancient magical staff that can cast any spell imaginable. However, it cannot resurrect the dead or use the same spell more than once, producing random effects if she attempts to do so. Tina Minoru, the Staff's owner previous to Nico, mentions that the Staff even made Dormammu (a demonic entity with vast magical power far surpassing even that of the Sorcerer Supreme) tremble and that it gave the wielder "[a]ll the power of the past, present and future" and would make its wielder "unstoppable." Tina is also able to do spells without saying them, as evident when she turns herself, Robert Minoru, and the Steins into their villain costumes. In Civil War: Young Avengers/Runaways, Nico successfully cast a tunneling spell using a Latin phrase supplied to her by Vision without knowing its meaning.

Only Nico (and other members of the Minoru family) can summon the Staff, but initially, anyone could cast spells with it. When not in use the Staff retreats into her body, which Nico describes as "feeling like I have something in my eye, but instead of my eye, it's...it's my soul." To summon the Staff, Nico sheds blood and automatically recites "When blood is shed, let the Staff of One emerge." Early in volume one, Nico would cut herself to release the Staff, often using Chase's switchblade. As the series progressed, Nico found alternative ways to make herself bleed, including brushing her gums for extended periods of time and having Gert's Deinonychus Old Lace bite her arm. The Staff always emerges from the center of her chest, and passes through any clothing she is wearing without damaging it or Nico. However the Staff will damage anyone or anything directly in its way when ejected from Nico's body. For example, the Staff emerged after the vampire Topher began to drain Nico's blood and pierced his chest. Nico cannot truly control what kind of effect her spells will have: she must conjure up painful memories to cast a spell, as well as imagining anything that makes her feel guilty. In the Mystic Arcana series, Nico is said to have far greater magical potential than even she had realized, as the last living heir to the Clan Minoru; Nico overwhelms Marie LaVeau in a matter of moments, despite all of Marie's magical experience and power, and discovers that the roots of her family legacy are deeper than even she imagined, with her being the only person alive capable of unlocking the Black Mirror. Nico is told that she has stepped onto the Dark Path and that she and Marie shall meet again, "for all those who step onto the Dark Path are destined to travel that road together." On occasion, however, she has cast spells without resorting to the Staff, such as creating an image of Alex Wilder in the palm of her hand, and casting a shield spell taught to her Wong. Time and space are also crucial limitations to the power of the Staff: all spells shown cast by it only have a temporary effect, and the effects of these spells weaken as the distance between Nico and the target increases.

In Runaways vol. 2 #17, it is revealed that if Nico steps into the path of the ashes of dead wizards, her powers will not work at all.

=== Extended magic ===
Nico's time with the Witchbreaker has granted her a newer version of the Staff of One, similar to the original but with more adornments and a larger ring (the ball on the original Staff is also removed). Nico can now wield its powers and cast spells with greater proficiency than before, even floating under her own powers instead of using the Staff, as Nico had already cast a variety of levitation enchantments before. Furthermore, Victor Mancha also questions how Nico is floating, apparently indicating that this was indeed not of the Staff's own magic. Nico can now cast a variety of spells without using her Staff, bringing her closer to her parents' abilities. It is unknown where the original Staff of One is now, though her new staff, regardless of its precise origins, is summoned in exactly the same method as the former. Without her staff, Shes been shown flying, making shields, and projecting holograms.

More recently, Nico's Staff has displayed an ability to defend itself. The Staff now reacts violently toward anyone other than Nico who attempts to use it, turning into a demon or dragon and devouring that individual.

Later in Daken: Dark Wolverine she shows that her spells can be extremely detailed when she freezes Daken with "Freeze to the exact temperature and aesthetic appearance of a cheap Popsicle from a 7/11" though she still has the "One spell" rule.

After her murder by Apex and subsequent resurrection, Nico once again received a new Staff of One with a new design up top. This staff also was shorter and did not extend to the ground, could be touched by anyone (as Apex proved), and could be summoned back to Nico upon command. Nico was also granted a new left arm where she could perform spells without holding the Staff of One. According to the resurrected Alex, the left arm was clearly a more powerful conduit of dark magic than even the Staff of One. This upgrade increased her dark powers and allowed her to enter a blind rage where her magic is more powerful, as she runs purely on instinct. She was also able to focus on multiple spells at once.

=== Character attributes and personality ===
Nico summons the Staff of One for the first time.

Nico is Japanese American. She is also shown to be a very emotional person. She expresses feelings for Alex Wilder during their original getaway, but is hesitant to start a romance. After Alex saves her from a vampire attack, sometime later she begins to date him. This pattern of seeking physical or romantic comfort with people during stressful or intense situations follows Nico throughout the remainder of the series. Despite this, Nico proves her loyalty to the Runaways when Alex betrays the group and offers her a seat in the new world promised by Pride's Biblical benefactors, the Gibborim. She refuses Alex's offer brutally and helps usher her friends to safety. Nico is sent to Father Flanagan's Home for Unwanted Goth Kids. However, the group organizes a mass escape from their homes to begin life as full-time vigilantes; Nico is generally accepted as the team leader.

When Nico takes the leadership position, it proves she has the intelligence and courage to make difficult decisions. One notable example is a risky decision in leaving Xavin to battle a resurrected Geoffrey Wilder herself saying "Xavin knew the risks". In another incident where the Punisher was holding them at gunpoint and was seriously injured by being punched in the stomach by Molly, when the others expressed concern about his condition, Nico flatly stated that she "wasn't going to waste a healing spell" on him. Nico also kisses Chase after he negotiates their way out of a potentially fatal situation with an interdimensional drug-dealer; this causes a falling out between Nico and Chase's girlfriend Gert, almost dissolving the team from the inside. Gert's untimely death sends Nico into the arms of Victor Mancha, with whom she reveals she has a habit of running to people when distressed. She suffered survivor's guilt regarding Gert's death. Her insecurities and confusion over her romantic life comes to haunt her in a dream, where her deceased parents berated Nico for acting like a "slut" (for kissing Alex, Topher, Chase and Victor). Nico admits she is confused but she will figure "who and what (she) likes on her own" and then she kills them. She begins a relationship with Victor, but the relationship is quickly ended mutually after Victor falls for another girl.

Nico became very isolated and unstable after the events of Avengers Arena, where she was dismembered, resurrected, and ultimately survived Murderworld, having almost no contact with the Runaways, even ignoring Molly's birthday. She explains she was destroyed after the events of the Arena, she was terrified of her new powers and was likely suffering from severe PTSD, and seeing Chase return to normal after the experience only made her hurt more.

== Relationships with other Runaways ==
Nico is a very emotional person and has repeatedly expressed difficulty with knowing precisely what she is feeling. Nico admits to Victor that she has a tendency to seek comfort after highly emotional situations or periods of stress. Despite this, she is typically very open when trying to express her feelings and has thus been able to connect with many of the Runaways on an emotional level and maintain many close friendships throughout the series. Over the years, Minoru has romantic relationships with several people, including Alex Wilder - by whose treachery she is devastated - and Victor Mancha. She has a confusing and frustrating time with the mutual feelings between her and Karolina, however, a romantic relationship never developed as their timing never seemed to work out. Nico did eventually realize that she truly did love Karolina and after asking for a second chance, started a relationship with her.

=== Alex Wilder ===
In the first volume, Nico and Alex share a brief relationship. She kisses him for the first time during the Runaways' attempted rescue of Molly Hayes; it is later revealed Alex was Nico's first kiss. She kisses and expresses love for Alex after he saves her from the vampire Topher; it is generally accepted that Nico and Alex are a couple at this point. Despite her professed love for Alex, Nico chooses to side with the Runaways after Alex reveals his plan to bring her to the Gibborim's new world with her parents, firmly establishing her dedication to the team and her strength of character. However, despite the betrayal, Nico demonstrates willingness to forgive when she unsuccessfully tries to resurrect Alex, and states that even though Alex was a traitor, he did not deserve death. In Mystic Arena set in volume one, she still misses and loves him. During the events of Avengers Undercover, Alex is resurrected by Daimon Hellstrom to become Nico's tutor in battle strategy. She reminiscences her past affection for him; however, it's now replaced with murder daydreams of him and annoyance of his attempts to flirt with her. She tells him "what we used to be, that's dead". After Chase was injured in battle and left comatose, she is devastated and blamed herself. Nico momentarily gave up being good as it kept turning out wrong and hurt people she loves. She decided to 'do the wrong thing' in order to feel good, and briefly rekindled her romance with Alex before he betrayed her. And once again, they went their separate ways as she fought alongside the superheroes whereas Alex joined the super-villainous team, Young Masters.

=== Karolina Dean ===
Karolina's feelings for Nico were hinted at throughout volume 1, ending with Karolina sheepishly blushing when Nico says she has sworn off boys. However, Karolina's feelings were not explicitly expressed until she attempted to kiss Nico. Nico immediately turned Karolina down; however, when Karolina decides to travel to her home planet Majesdane with Xavin, Nico is distraught for losing her friend. The Runaways stop Nico from casting a spell to bring Karolina back to Earth. Months later, Chase catches Nico strewing Karolina's clothes about her floor for remembrance's sake and tells him, "I didn't hurt this bad when Alex betrayed us. I didn't even hurt like this when our parents died". After Karolina returns, Nico becomes overjoyed and hugs her, saying that she felt all alone with Karolina gone. Their friendship is an occasionally strained one, due to Karolina's unrequited feelings towards Nico and Nico's conflicted feelings towards Karolina's relationships. When the group re-bands some time later, Nico attempted to kiss Karolina, revealing her possible romantic feelings. However, Karolina rejected her, due to her wanting to be faithful to her girlfriend, Julie Power, and dismissed it as Nico's habit of seeking physical comfort in times of stress. Following Julie and Karolina's break-up, Karolina invited Nico to attend her parents' legitimate foundation's charity ball with her. While there, Karolina's usual nervousness was replaced by newfound confidence because of Nico's support as she has "always seen the real" her. Nico confessed for a long time she was confused about herself so she couldn't see her clearly. Nico knows who and what she wants now and asks Karolina to give her a second chance. Karolina was surprised and a little scared but the two kissed, beginning a relationship.

=== Chase Stein ===
Nico admits she provides a motherly role to Chase's rule-breaking persona. The pair maintain a strong respect for each other despite often disagreeing over major group decisions, including Gert's burial site and allowing Victor to join the team. Chase cares for Nico's safety and well-being, as evidenced from when he comforted Nico after Karolina's departure, and when he took the Staff of One from Nico to destroy it to give her a normal life. After Chase bluffed their way out of a fatal encounter with the drug lord, Pusher-Man, Nico kisses him. This causes a rift in their friendship, and into Gert and Chase's relationship. Nico is also the only person that Chase bids farewell before leaving to sacrifice himself for the Gibborim, which Nico interprets as a cry for help. Following their adventure in 1907, Chase and Nico's friendship appeared to be more stable after Chase moved past grieving for Gert. In vol. 3, issue #13, the two share a surprising and intimate kiss. Later, both were kidnapped together by Arcade to participate in his latest incarnation of Murderworld. In there, Nico started to develop a love-hate relationship with Chase. She repeatedly chided Chase for acting out of character and risking their lives. During the events of the arena, Nico was angry at Chase for acting differently or untrustworthy, even kicking him out of the group at one point. Despite this, Chase planned on protecting Nico and making sure she and not himself, was going to survive Murderworld. After the events of the Arena, Nico became reclusive while Chase became the sole guardian of the Runaways. Nico was angry that Chase had reverted to his old-self after Murderworld, while she thought of herself as broken. She was devastated when Chase was left comatose after a battle.

=== Gertrude Yorkes ===
Gert and Nico had been close friends since birth. After Gert's death, Nico tells Victor (while crying) that Gert had sent her My Little Pony dolls in the forest because Gert thought they should be free and Nico had knit a purple scarf for Gert's thirteenth birthday, prompting Gert to dye her hair that color. Nico also told Gert that should Nico get hurt, Gert would be the leader of the group. The pair's friendship briefly breaks after Gert discovered Nico's kiss with Chase after their encounter with the Pusher Man. Their falling out caused much friction in the group. Nico and Gert finally resolved their differences with a short bout of tossing insults. Despite Gert's cynical attitude, she rarely argued with Nico's decisions and was usually prepared to stand by her friend. Nico experiences survivor's guilt after Gert dies, knowing that Gert's murderer Geoffrey Wilder had initially meant to kill Nico.

=== Victor Mancha ===
Nico explains that she seeks physical comfort after periods of stress. While Victor expresses feelings for Nico, she asks for time alone to clear her head and figure her feelings out, much like how she initially dealt with Alex and Karolina after each expressed feelings for Nico. However, Nico admits that Victor is genuinely a good guy and would not mind being in a relationship with him. Victor calls Nico his girlfriend when he attempts to save her from Chase, and although she is in a hostage situation, Nico still lightly scolds Victor for calling her such. The two eventually become a couple. However, the relationship is brief as Victor falls for Lillie, a carefree girl from 1907. Trying to become a better person, Nico, seeing that Victor and Lillie are in love, steps aside, deciding to remain friends even after Lillie decides to stay in the past.

== Reception ==
=== Critical reception ===
Brandon Zachary of CBR.com referred to Nico as a "breakout star," writing, "Of all the Runaways, it makes a certain amount of sense that Nico would be the breakout lead. As one of the more assertive and overtly powerful members of the group, Nico often took center stage in battles and crossovers with other groups. Her mystical abilities allow her to keep up with other heroes in terms of raw power. This justifies her appearances in other stories when teammates like the relatively human Gert and Chase realistically can't. Her status as an Asian-American and LGBTQ+ character allows her to represent an often overlooked demographic in comics, giving these communities a chance to shine. While the Runaways still exist in the Marvel Universe, Nico is really the only one who has blown up in popularity. Although the entire cast has ties to the larger universe and played important roles in stories, Nico has outshone her teammates. While it's a shame the rest of the characters haven't been as central to the universe as Nico, it's still a sign that their legacy lives on." Tomi Nabach of ComicsVerse stated, "You may be wondering why Nico getting to be in a relationship with the girl she likes is such a big deal. There's already a canon LGBT character in RUNAWAYS even without Nico. Certainly, Karolina is great. In fact, Karolina has stood out as a fundamental gay character in the comics for a while. There's something to be noted about Karolina, though — she's white. In fact, almost all the gay representation we saw in comics at the time of Karolina coming out was white people. This goes doubly for gay women. While the comics have a few more LGBT characters who are men of color, like Rictor, the dating prospects for LGBT women are…blindingly white. Nico represents a change for the better when it comes to the representation of LGBT people of color. There's another problem Nico helps cover as well. Marvel, for all its steps forward in LGBT rep, has a bad habit of making bisexuals/pansexuals morally grey characters. Daken, Mystique, and Deadpool, for example, are all bisexual or pansexual in the comics. This seems to reflect the unfortunate stereotype that bi/pan people aren't trustworthy, are sneaky, and/or manipulative. Nico changes this narrative as well — Nico's a hero. Nico is unambiguously good. Unlike Marvel's other bi/pan characters, Nico is someone who can't be portrayed as an untrustworthy person who "can't choose a side" when it comes to morality or sexuality. Nico's refreshing representation for bisexual and pansexual people, especially women of color."

=== Accolades ===
- In 2014, Autostraddle ranked Nico 10th in their "11 Female Superheroes I Wish Marvel Would Make Movies About" list.
- In 2015, Bustle ranked Nico 4th in their "14 Female Superheroes Who Deserve Stardom" list.
- In 2017, BuzzFeed ranked Nico 10th in their "27 Kick-Ass Female Superheroes You'll Love If Wonder Woman Is Your Favorite" list.
- In 2018, WhatCulture ranked Nico 2nd in their "The Runaways: Every Character Ranked Worst To Best" list.
- In 2019, CBR.com ranked Nico 1st in their "10 Most Powerful Members of The Runaways" list.
- In 2019, Sideshow included Nico in their "Marvel's Most Masterful Witches" list.
- In 2020, Scary Mommy included Nico in their "Looking For A Role Model? These 195+ Marvel Female Characters Are Truly Heroic" list.
- In 2021, Screen Rant included Nico in their "10 Most Powerful Members Of Marvel's A-Force" list.
- In 2021, CBR.com ranked Nico 4th in their "10 LGBTQ+ Marvel Characters Who Deserve A Solo Series" list.
- In 2022, The A.V. Club ranked Nico 78th in their "100 best Marvel characters" list.

== Other versions ==
=== Secret Wars (2015) ===
During the "Secret Wars" storyline, several alternate universe versions of Nico Minoru reside in the domains of Battleworld.

- A variation of Nico Minoru is a fighter in the Killiseum, located in the Battleworld domain of Doomstadt.
- A variation of Nico Minoru is a member of A-Force, the defenders of the matriarchal Battleworld domain of Arcadia.

=== Ultimate Universe ===
An alternate universe version of Nico Minoru from Earth-6160 appears in the Ultimate Universe. This version is a resident of Hi No Kuni, a power bloc which includes Japan's territories and is ruled by the Sun Emperor.

== In other media ==
=== Television ===
Nico Minoru appears in television series set in the Marvel Cinematic Universe (MCU).

- Nico first appears in Runaways (2017), portrayed by Lyrica Okano. This version is a student at Atlas Academy in Los Angeles who became a goth following the death of her sister, Amy. After accidentally discovering the Staff of One, a mystical artifact connected to the Dark Dimension that requires familial DNA samples, she receives training from her mother Tina Minoru.
- An alternate reality variant of Nico appears in Your Friendly Neighborhood Spider-Man, voiced by Grace Song. This version is Peter Parker's best friend and classmate at Rockford T. Bales High School.

=== Video games ===
- Nico Minoru appears as a playable character in Marvel: Avengers Alliance.
- Nico Minoru appears as a playable character in Marvel: Future Fight.
- Nico Minoru appears in Marvel Strike Force.
- Nico Minoru appears in Marvel Avengers Academy, voiced by Maya Tuttle.
- Nico Minoru as Sister Grimm appears in Pinball FX 2 as part of the "Marvel's Women of Power" DLC.
- Nico Minoru appears as a playable character in Marvel Puzzle Quest.
- Nico Minoru appears as a playable character in Lego Marvel Super Heroes 2, as part of the "Runaways" DLC.
- Nico Minoru appears as a playable character in Marvel's Midnight Suns, voiced by Lyrica Okano. This version is a member of the titular Midnight Suns, whom she joined sometime after the Runaways disbanded.
- Nico Minoru appears in Marvel Snap.
