= Scary Mommy =

American website for mothers

- Website type: Online media
- Available in: English
- Founded: March 2008; 18 years ago in Baltimore, Maryland, United States
- Headquarters: 20 W 22nd St Ste 301, New York City, New York, United States
- Country of origin: United States
- Owner: Bustle Digital Group
- Founder: Jill Smokler
- Editor: Kate Auletta
- Revenue: ▲$6.8 million (2025)
- Website: www.scarymommy.com
- Commercial: Yes
- Registration: No
- Current status: Active
- Native client on: Web browser

Scary Mommy is a website that produces content targeting mothers, specifically focusing on parenting, motherhood, current events, and pop culture. The site is owned by Bustle Digital Group, and the website is based in New York City. Scary Mommy began as Jill Smokler's personal blog. The site peaked around 2009-2015.

== History ==
Scary Mommy was founded in March 2008 by Jill Smokler (1977–2026) in Baltimore, Maryland. A companion book titled Confessions of a Scary Mommy was published by Smokler in April 2012 and became an instant bestseller. Scary Mommy Nation, a 501(c)(3) non-profit organization, was established by Smokler in 2013, which raised money for families who weren't able to afford a Thanksgiving dinner. In 2014, the website and its service earned its first Webby Award in the "Family/Parenting" category, which was then followed by additional Webby Awards in 2015 and 2018.

In February 2015, the website was acquired by Some Spiders Studios, with Smokler staying on as chief content officer for the next three years. In March 2017, Smokler announced her split from her husband. Smokler left Scary Mommy in May 2018. In 2020, Some Spider Studios acquired Fatherly, and in 2021, Bustle Digital Group acquired Some Spider.

On June 22, 2026, Smokler died of glioblastoma, an aggressive form of brain cancer, at the age of 48.

== Content ==
Scary Mommy originated as a parenting and motherhood blog by Jill Smokler. The blog incorporated the Scary Mommy Confessions feature, which enabled users to share anonymous messages related to motherhood. Scary Mommy also launched a channel on Snapchat's Discover feature in 2018.
