= Karolina Dean =

Character from Marvel Comics

- Karolina Dean as depicted on the textless cover of Runaways vol. 5 #3 (November 2017). Art by Kris Anka.

Publication information
- Publisher: Marvel Comics
- First appearance: Runaways #1 (July 2003)
- Created by: Brian K. Vaughan (writer); Adrian Alphona (artist)

In-story information
- Alter ego: Karolina Dean
- Species: Majesdanian
- Place of origin: Earth
- Team affiliations: Runaways
- Notable aliases: Princess Justice; Lucy in the Sky
- Abilities: Solar energy manipulation granting: Light energy blasts; Bioluminescence; Heat resistance and generation; Force fields; Flight

Karolina Dean (/ˌkærəˈliːnə/ karr-ə-LEE-nə) is a superhero appearing in American comic books published by Marvel Comics. Created by writer Brian K. Vaughan and artist Adrian Alphona, Karolina Dean first appeared in Runaways #1 (July 2003). Dean belongs to the extraterrestrial species known as Majesdanians, and possesses solar-based energy powers. She is a member of the Runaways, a group that seeks to stop the Pride, a team of supervillains. She has also been known under the codenames Lucy in the Sky and Princess Justice at various points in her history.

Karolina Dean appears in the Hulu / Marvel Cinematic Universe television series Runaways, portrayed by Virginia Gardner.

== Development ==
=== Concept and creation ===
In Brian K. Vaughan's original pitch for the series, Karolina Dean was originally called Leslie. This name would eventually be given to the character's mother. Her parents were originally real estate agents, rather than famous actors. Dean's Majesdanian form has been colored in two distinct styles. Brian Reber, the first colorist of Runaways, colored Dean with many different colors of the visible spectrum from panel to panel. Christina Strain, the second colorist for Runaways, colors Dean in lighter tones, using primarily blue, yellow, and pink with a glitter-like effect.

=== Publication history ===
Karolina Dean debuted in Runaways #1 (July 2003), created by Brian K. Vaughan and Adrian Alphona. She appeared in the 2010 Avengers Academy series, on the cover of the first issue of the 2015 A-Force series, in the 2017 Runaways series, the 2021 Marvel's Voices: Pride one-shot, and the 2022 Marvel's Voices Infinity Comic series.

== Fictional character biography ==
=== The Pride ===
Daughter of renowned Hollywood stars, Karolina Dean is the only older Runaway who did not see her parents kill an innocent girl as a sacrifice. Dean initially denied everything, but after learning she is an alien, she soon came to believe the accusations. The Runaways make the decision to leave home, before leaving for good, but not before gathering evidence against their parents from their homes in order to prosecute them. When arriving at the Dean mansion, they discover the final will and testament of Dean's parents; Dean is handed a piece of paper that has the circle "no symbol" covering the Caduceus on it. Because Dean's medic alert bracelet bears the insignia, Alex Wilder persuades her to take it off. Dean gives in angrily, thinking that her penicillin allergy is the main reason she wears the bracelet. Immediately, her skin glows with a fluid, rainbow-like light. The team believes Dean is an alien and that the bracelet is an anchor to conceal her abilities. Dean later adopts the moniker Lucy in the Sky, a reference to the song "Lucy in the Sky with Diamonds," after the group escapes their parents.

=== As a fugitive ===
In early issues of Runaways, volume 2, Karolina Dean, under Nico Minoru's command, becomes more comfortable with her extraterrestrial identity, and hints at being a lesbian. She compliments Julie Power during a battle with Excelsior over the custody of Victor Mancha, and later agrees to date her after a joint mission with Avengers Academy, eventually becoming romantically involved. Dean comes out to Minoru with an attempted kiss, which Minoru rejects. Her insecurities resurface when her Skrull fiancée, Xavin, arrives on Earth. Dean's parents arranged their marriage to foster peace between their homeworlds. Dean leaves with Xavin, much to Minoru's distress.

On her home planet Majesdane, Karolina Dean learns to control her Majesdanian and humanoid forms and how to further control her solar powers. However, her wedding is disrupted, and she and Xavin flee to Earth as their homeworlds reignite their war. They crash land near the Hostel and help rescue Molly Hayes. Dean dreams of her parents tearing her apart. She remains with the team, and Xavin is accepted after Gertrude Yorkes' death. They join the Runaways in defeating the Gibborim. When the Runaways are accidentally displaced in 1907, Dean meets Klara Prast and convinces the team to accept her.

=== Deportation and other activities ===
In S.W.O.R.D. #2, Karolina Dean is kidnapped by Henry Gyrich in his "aliens go home" policy, using pheromones targeting her Majesdanian physiology. He leads her away from the Runaways and kidnaps her without difficulty. She is eventually freed and helps save Earth from hostile aliens. Abigail Brand, now head of S.W.O.R.D., returns all the aliens to Earth, granting each of them freedom and a favor.

In Avengers Arena, Dean and Hayes seek Hank Pym's help when Minoru and Chase Stein go missing, dismissing Hayes' concerns that they were taken. Instead, Dean believed they ran off to be together. Dean later visits Minoru and Stein in the S.H.I.E.L.D. detention center after Hazmat allegedly kills Arcade. Dean entered a relationship with Julie Power.

=== Reunion ===
After the Runaways disbanded, Karolina Dean moved on to a happy college life, overcoming her past anxieties with therapy. She declined an invitation to reunite, feeling she had grown and changed. She reasoned they were never a real team like the Avengers and had no mission beyond survival. Minoru agreed but felt guilty. Dean visited Minoru's apartment to reconsider, but rejected Minoru's kiss, attributing it to stress and her own relationship. The Runaways eventually reunited to rescue Yorkes and Hayes from Hayes' grandmother. Dean avoided harm but intervened when Minoru was attacked. They returned home, battered but finding solace as a makeshift family.

The Runaways resettled in their old hideout, the Hostel. Karolina Dean fit back in seamlessly but struggled to balance her classes and relationship with Julie Power. When Doctor Doom attacked during Power's visit, their differing views on the Runaways' methods caused tension. Power was frustrated by Dean's reluctance to open up about her past. To drown her sorrows in sugar over Dean ignoring her once again, Power accidentally ate an enchanted cupcake, turning her into a thirteen-year-old. The Runaways reversed the spell, but Power broke up with Dean, feeling secondary to the team. Dean admitted to neglecting Power, making the breakup inevitable. Later, at a charity ball, Minoru confessed her feelings to Dean. Despite initial hesitation, Minoru and Dean kissed, beginning a relationship.

== Powers and abilities ==
Karolina Dean's powers are derived from her Majesdanian physiology, possessing solar manipulation abilities. In her natural Majesdanian form, she is luminous, iridescent, and visually fluid, often depicted with waves of rainbow-like light emanating from her body, which Stein described as "a burning painting." Despite this, her body structure remains humanoid.

Dean can fire concussive blasts, shoot laser beams, and create force fields. She can absorb and re-radiate solar energy. Dean also has the ability to fly. During an encounter with the vampire Topher, it is revealed that her blood contains solar energy properties, causing Topher to combust after drinking it. Her mom was shown to be able to control and shape her energy blasts after they left her body, and Dean seems to be starting to be able to do the same thing, able to make forcefields and harmlessly pick people up with her energy.

Initially, Dean required a custom-made medic alert bracelet made of alien metal to appear human. After spending many months on Majesdane, she learned to control the change and can now transform at will.

== Reception ==
=== Comic books ===
Peyton Hinckle of ComicsVerse referred to Karolina Dean as a "fan favorite," writing, "Her popularity has grown even more, making her one of the most well-known lesbian characters in the comics industry. Readers and viewers alike adore Karolina Dean for her free-spiritedness and diverse background. But I think there's more to Karolina's character than just what's on the surface. Yes, she's a rare gem in a sea of heterosexual heroes, but she's also one of the best role models Marvel has (which might not be saying much but you get the point). Like so many real-life queer teens, Karolina struggled to understand her true self: as a superpowered alien and as a lesbian. She also was able to overcome those struggles and find self-acceptance. As readers, viewers, and fans, we can take our own challenges and use Karolina's model to become the people we want to be." Deirdre Kaye of Scary Mommy called Karolina Dean a "role model" and a "truly heroic" female character. Vanessa Friedman of Autostraddle described Karolina Dean as one of their "favorite kickass fictional heroines," stating Dean and Xavin form one of the "best queer couples" in recent comics, saying, "These two are able to not only overcome their supervillian legacies, but also the racism and homophobia that they face for being an interracial lesbian couple," while Mey Rude, also writing for Autostraddle, hoped to see Dean starring in her own movie in the Marvel Cinematic Universe. Joshua Yehl of IGN said, "Kar wouldn't be the first gay person to develop feelings for a straight friend, and that's what makes writer Brian K. Vaughan and artist Adrian Alphona's depiction of her so authentic. The reader watches her struggle with her feelings, spiral downward into self-destruction, and rise back up by expressing herself only to hit a new low afterward. Coming out is not an easy one-time event, but a long, emotional process that doesn't always turn out as planned. While Kar did not get the reaction she wanted from Nico, she made the same awkward coming out mistakes that countless others have, making this alien girl feel all the more human." Keertana Sastry of Bustle expressed interest in seeing a movie featuring Karolina Dean, calling her "freaking cool."

=== Marvel Cinematic Universe ===
Adam Symchuk of MovieWeb described Karolina Dean as one of the most "beloved" characters in Runaways. Comic Book Resources called Karolina Dean a "fan-favorite." Karolina Dean became the first lesbian superhero to appear in Marvel's television universe. Marvel noted how fans of the show nicknamed the relationship between Karolina Dean and Nico Minoru as "Deanoru." Melody McCune of Sideshow praised the couple, writing, "Best of all, their love triumphs over adversity. They're just two cute, superpowered girlfriends doing hero stuff." Their kiss in the first season of Runaways marked Marvel's first on-screen, same-sex, superhero kiss.

== Other versions ==
An alternate version of Karolina Dean appears in Marvel Zombies. She first appears eating Old Lace with the rest of the zombified Runaways. She again appears in Marvel Zombies Halloween, where she and several other zombies attempt to eat Kitty Pryde and her son, but are all killed by Mephisto.

== In other media ==
=== Television ===
Karolina Dean appears in Runaways, portrayed by Virginia Gardner. This version is a human-Gibborim hybrid and part of a family of exiled royal magistrates. Over the course of the first season, Dean slowly learns more about her true form and powers and expresses feelings toward Nico Minoru, whom she soon enters a relationship with.

=== Video games ===
- Karolina Dean appears as a playable character in Marvel: Avengers Alliance.
- Karolina Dean appears as a playable character in Lego Marvel Super Heroes 2 as part of the Marvel's Runaways Character and Level Pack DLC.
- Karolina Dean appears as a playable character in Marvel Avengers Academy.
- Karolina Dean appears as a playable character in Marvel Puzzle Quest.
- Karolina Dean appears as a playable character in Marvel Contest of Champions.

=== Merchandise ===
- In 2018, HeroClix released a figure of Karolina Dean as part of their Secret Wars - Battleword line.
- In 2018, Funko released a Karolina Dean Funko Pop figure inspired by the Marvel Cinematic Universe (MCU) incarnation of the character.

== See also ==
- LGBT themes in comics
