= Victor Mancha =

Character from Marvel Comics

- Victor Mancha as depicted on the cover of Runaways vol. 2 #22 (2007). Cover art by Jo Chen.

Publication information
- Publisher: Marvel Comics
- First appearance: Runaways vol. 2 #1 (April 2005)
- Created by: Brian K. Vaughan; Adrian Alphona

In-story information
- Alter ego: Victor Mancha
- Team affiliations: Runaways; Avengers A.I.
- Abilities: Superhuman strength and speed High intelligence Photographic memory Electromagnetic manipulation Technopathy

Victor Mancha, also known as Victorious, is a fictional superhero appearing in American comic books published by Marvel Comics. The character appeared in the award-winning series Runaways. Like the original Runaways, Victor has a supervillain for a parent; his is the Avengers villain Ultron, an evil robot bent on world domination. Victor, however, is a cyborg, with human flesh and natural tissue cloned from his human mother, which conceals his metal parts and circuitry.

== Publication history ==
Victor Mancha was created by author Brian K. Vaughan and artist Adrian Alphona and debuted in Runaways vol. 2 #1 (April 2005).

On colorist Christina Strain's Live Journal, she revealed that Victor's eyes are green with a golden center, which was modeled after Gael García Bernal.

== Fictional character biography ==
Victor Mancha is a cyborg created by Ultron after he encountered Marianella Mancha, a woman who was unable to conceive naturally due to a drug that was put in her. Ultron took some of Mancha's DNA and cloned it to create Victor Mancha, incorporating his own nanotechnology into him.

=== True Believers ===
An older version of Gertrude Yorkes arrives in the present and informs the Runaways of a villain in her time named "Victorious", and how they must stop him while he is still a teen. After the Runaways track Victor down at his school, the sight of Karolina Dean activates Victor's electromagnetic superpowers - it would later be revealed that Victor's powers would manifest only when he came in contact with another superhero. Victor discovers that his actual "father" is Ultron, who created him as a sleeper agent for the Avengers. Victor was meant to grow up, travel to New York, and meet the Avengers. After years of loyal service, he would have access to their most guarded secrets, and then Ultron would have taken over and destroyed every hero on the planet. The Runaways foiled this plan, but Victor still fears this future may come true.

=== Runaways ===
Over the next few months, Victor proves himself to the team, particularly to Chase Stein, in battle to make up for his alternate future self. He falls out of grace for a short while after Nico Minoru discovers that the Pride has tapped into Victor's circuits and was using him to spy on the team.

After the Runaways' fight with the new Pride, Victor begins a relationship with Nico; he confesses to have initiated it because he harbors romantic feelings for her, but Nico claims to have participated as a way to escape her guilt regarding the death of Gertrude Yorkes. However, Victor still attempts a rescue when he discovers Chase has Nico hostage, but is easily shut down when Chase asks him a rhetorical question designed to overload Victor's circuits. Victor recovers with help from Molly Hayes and saves Nico from being sacrificed to the Gibborim.

=== Dead-End Kids ===
After escaping Iron Man and S.H.I.E.L.D., Nico makes a decision to make a deal with Kingpin, which disgusts Victor. The Runaways end up time-displaced in 1907 New York. It is during this period where Victor meets Lillie McGurty, a girl who can fly to the sound of music. While separated from Nico, Victor bonds with Lillie's carefree spirit. A short time later, he has a dream of kissing Lillie. Nico, understanding her relationship with Victor is deteriorating, backs off and allows Victor to initiate a relationship with Lillie, who agrees to return to the present with the Runaways. Right before the Runaways board the time machine that takes them home, Lillie changes her mind and decides to stay behind.

=== Avengers A.I. ===
Following the Age of Ultron storyline, Victor Mancha joins up with Hank Pym's Avengers A.I. alongside Monica Chang, Vision (his older "brother"), and a reprogrammed Doombot. During one mission he sacrifices himself to save a server containing an A.I. civilization. The team later discovers he is alive inside a server called the Diamond.

=== Vision ===
Some time later, Victor moves in with Vision after getting an internship in Washington, D.C. It is later revealed that Victor is actually acting as an undercover agent for the Avengers, with orders to spy on Vision and his family due to their increasingly erratic behavior. It is revealed via flashbacks that during his time with the Runaways, Victor had secretly developed an addiction to Vibranium, which for him acts similarly to narcotics used by humans. After using the Vibranium in a special piano given to Vision by Black Panther, Victor misjudges the strength of his powers and accidentally kills Vision's son, Vin. Vision's wife Virginia kills Victor in retaliation.

=== Becoming Victorious ===
When Chase Stein attempts to revive Victor's head, the "Victorious" program begins. It is revealed that Victor is conscious when Chase Stein, Nico Minoru, Gertrude Yorkes, and Old Lace visit Molly Hayes to see if she is interested in reforming the Runaways again. During this visit, Molly is the only one to figure out that he is conscious and is happy that Victor is still alive in a sense. Victor asks Molly to keep this a secret as he figures out whether or not he wants to rejoin Chase and the others. Victor's body is eventually fully rebuilt.

== Powers and abilities ==
Victor Mancha is a cyborg, created from the DNA of Marianella Mancha and the technology of Ultron. Victor was constructed using advanced nanite technology that will evolve and mature with Victor into adulthood so that his robotic innards will transform into artificial human organs, indistinguishable from real ones. Ultron created Victor with several computer-related abilities, including a high level of intelligence, vast amounts of hard drive memory (which Victor refers to as photographic memory), and the ability to communicate with other machines directly. Victor also possesses some level of superhuman strength, and speed, and an automated self-repair function.

In combat, Victor primarily employs his electromagnetic abilities; he is capable of directing high-voltage electrical energy from his hands and manipulating magnetic fields to reshape and bend metallic objects. Much like Magneto, Victor can use Earth's natural magnetic lines of force to levitate and fly.

At his current age, Victor's nanites have not yet fully transformed into human organs, so his entire body will set off metal detectors, potentially drawing him unwanted attention. Second, Victor's mainframe can be hacked and controlled remotely.

== Other versions ==
=== What If? ===
In What If the Runaways became the Young Avengers?, Victor is first contacted by his future self of Victorious after Victorious traveled back from the future with Iron Lad. Victor and Victorious steal the Iron Lad armor, and Victor pretends to be Iron Lad. He then recruits the Runaways, forcing them to be an actual superhero team, but intends to kill them. When Kang appears to rescue his younger self, the subsequent fight results in Iron Lad being killed and Kang being erased from history. Having averted his destiny, Victor departs via Kang's time-belt to find his own way, leaving the Runaways to continue as the Young Avengers.

=== Age of Ultron ===
A possible future version of Victor Mancha appears in Age of Ultron, where he is the last surviving member of the Runaways after Ultron's takeover.

=== Avengers A.I. ===
In one alternate future, Alexis has a vision of 12,000 A.D. in which rogue A.I. Dimitrios wipes out humanity, the Kree, the Skrulls, and the Inhumans and traps all mutants in a pocket dimension. Only the Avengers A.I. survive, led by Alexis. Victor joins the surviving Avengers in attacking Dimitrios, who kills him.
