= Molly Hayes =

Character from Marvel Comics

- Artwork by Adrian Alphona

Publication information
- Publisher: Marvel Comics
- First appearance: Runaways #1 (July 2003)
- Created by: Brian K. Vaughan (writer); Adrian Alphona (artist)

In-story information
- Alter ego: Molly Hayes
- Species: Human mutant
- Team affiliations: Runaways; X-Corporation
- Notable aliases: Bruiser; Princess Powerful
- Abilities: Superhuman strength; Bioluminescence; Invulnerability

Molly Hayes (also known as Bruiser or Princess Powerful) is a fictional superhero appearing in American comic books published by Marvel Comics. The character debuted in the award-winning series Runaways. Like every member of the original Runaways, she is the child of evil villains with special abilities; after the other older Runaways learn more about themselves, they raid Molly's home to find out her mutant abilities had already manifested. Often called "Mol" for short, Molly is the youngest Runaway and her innocence often serves as humor in the series, but she has demonstrated great insight at critical moments.

The character was reimagined as Molly Hayes Hernandez and portrayed by Allegra Acosta in the Hulu Marvel Cinematic Universe television series Runaways.

== Publication history ==
Molly Hayes was created by author Brian K. Vaughan and artist Adrian Alphona and debuted in Runaways #1.

Molly was originally the team's sole mutant; despite having telepathic mutant parents, Molly's mutant powers are superhuman strength and invulnerability. She used to be the youngest member of the team, but after inviting fellow mutant Klara Prast to join, Molly takes comfort in having another mutant and someone her own age. She is extremely proud of her mutant heritage and admires the X-Men. Runaways creator Brian K. Vaughan played a significant role in the character's subsequent development as well as artist/writer Adrian Alphona. Molly was named after Runaways creator Vaughan's younger sister, Molly Hayes Vaughan. Her trademark is an expansive lineup of hats displayed throughout the series.

== Production ==
Molly was one of the few Runaways to actually keep the name she had in Brian K. Vaughan's original proposal; she is named after Vaughan's younger sister, Molly Hayes Vaughan. However, in the original pitch for the series, Molly's parents were Hollywood actors. This would eventually become the cover story of Karolina's parents. Also, Molly's sibling-like relationship with Chase was originally supposed to be with Gert and this was shown in Hulu's version of the Runaways. Molly was supposed to be thirteen years old in the original pitch instead of eleven.

== Fictional character biography ==
=== The Pride ===
Cover to Runaways vol. 1 #15 Art by Jo Chen.

Molly is with friends Alex Wilder, Karolina Dean, Gertrude Yorkes, Chase Stein, and Nico Minoru when they observe their parents calling themselves The Pride and preparing the ritual sacrifice of a young girl. Molly is preemptively escorted away by Karolina while the older children watch the sacrifice commence. They inform Karolina and decide to run away from their homes that very night. After discovering their powers and gifts, the older five kids rescue Molly from her home. Molly awakes from a psychically induced slumber during the runaways' rescue and sees her mother being threatened by Nico. Molly's mutant powers manifest at that moment in a display of glowing pink hair and eyes. However, Molly first uses her strength to knock Leslie Dean out of the sky, saving Gert. Molly promptly falls asleep from exhaustion and the Runaways take her to their new hideout, a dilapidated mansion called "the Hostel".

Throughout the first volume of the series, Molly is skeptical that her parents were accomplices to murder and is unsure why the group ran away in the first place. However, she is excited at the prospect of becoming a superhero and enthusiastically takes the codename "Princess Powerful," while her teammates dub her "Bruiser." Shortly after their "superhero" careers begin, the Runaways take in fellow runaway Topher, who turns out to be a vampire. He dies by ingesting Karolina's solar-irradiated blood and when Molly witnesses Topher's death, she realizes that the superhero life is not a game, and cries for her mother.

Alex later deciphers a text kept by his parents called the Abstract, and informs the Runaways about their parents' activities as The Pride, their ties to the Gibborim (the Pride's benefactors), and their ultimate goal of exterminating all human life save for the six most loyal Pride members. Molly expresses disinterest in the Pride's motivations, but is excited when Alex plots to disrupt the Pride's ritual sacrifice to the Gibborim. When the Runaways encounter the Pride, Molly witnesses first-hand why she and her friends have been in hiding for months and destroys the sacrifice prepared for the Gibborim. She escapes with the Runaways when the Gibborim attack the Pride for losing the sacrifice. After the Pride's demise, Molly is sent to X-Corp for foster care, but breaks out with Gert's help and runs away with the rest of the team.

=== Runaways ===
After being energized, Molly tosses the weight of a skyscraper-sized monster in Runaways vol. 2 #20. Art by Adrian Alphona.

In the second volume, Molly fights under Nico's command and witnesses the future Gert die in Chase's arms as she warns the Runaways about the future supervillain named Victor Mancha. Molly participates in the search, and during the second fight with Excelsior, Molly discerns Chamber's fake accent; he is later revealed to be Geoffrey Wilder in disguise.

After Victor joins the team, Molly accompanies him on group shopping trips under Nico's orders because she believes that Molly is the only individual member of the Runaways capable of bringing Victor down should he betray the team. During the Runaways' trip to New York City to exonerate Cloak, Molly meets her idol and childish crush Wolverine, but he scares her and she hurls him out of a church, thereafter maintaining a severe dislike of him. During the adventure, the Punisher pursues the group in the mistaken belief that they are criminals. Molly stops him with a single punch, only to become distressed when she realizes the Punisher has no superpowers and that she has really hurt him. After the Runaways solve the case, they return to Los Angeles, but Wolverine and the X-Men follow them, looking to enroll Molly in Xavier's School for Gifted Youngsters. After a short altercation, the X-Men leave Molly alone, realizing that it would be unfair to force her to enroll.

During one mission, Molly gets separated from the team and the Provost abducts her. He coerces Molly and other children into robbing banks for him. Molly rallies the children to stage a coup, and she finds her way back to the Runaways.

Molly is abducted in a battle with a second incarnation of the Pride, made up of Alex's MMORPG friends and led by a younger version of Alex's father Geoffrey. Nico rescues Molly with Xavin's aid, but Gert dies covering their escape. After Gert's death, Molly asks the Leapfrog, the group's transport, if Gert went to Heaven, but it cannot reply since Heaven is not on any of the maps in its database. Soon afterwards, Molly begins hearing a disembodied voice she believes is Gert's, and follows its instructions to help revive Victor. She helps Victor rescue Nico from the Gibborim and subsequently joins the team on their cross-country trek to evade Iron Man and S.H.I.E.L.D. The voice Molly heard is later revealed to have been Alex's.

=== Mollifest Destiny ===
In Runaways #10, the Runaways travel to San Francisco after Molly receives Emma Frost's psychic message inviting all mutants to a new safe Haven. Molly's non-stop chatter quickly annoys several of the X-Men and Wolverine gives her a tour of the X-Men's new base of operations. Molly begins to annoy Wolverine and the two argue until he insults Molly's parents and calls her a brat, causing her to throw him through the roof.

Wolverine is urged by Cyclops and Emma Frost to take Molly outside, and complies. The two tour San Francisco before they are kidnapped by a villain that was an enemy of the Pride. The villain and his soldiers had attempted to claim a portion of Los Angeles, although the Hayes stopped him, massacring his men and putting him in a traumatizing seven-year coma where he could not close his eyes, all for their own sadistic enjoyment. He recovered and seeks revenge against them by telling Molly her parents were evil and sadistic, having killed innocent people and children. He calls them far worse than any super villain, and ultimately plans on killing her as his final act of revenge. Wolverine and Molly manage to defeat him, though Molly realizes she'll never think of her parents the same way again. She is, however, comforted by Wolverine, who says that despite their villainous ways, her parents must have genuinely loved her in order to "raise a kid as good as her."

=== Heroic Age ===
In Uncanny X-Men: The Heroic Age #1 Beast is waiting for Abigail Brand at the La Brea Tar Pits. Brand does not show up, and instead it's Molly who walks by. Molly tells him "the guys" have given her homework and asks him to tell her about extinction, but she actually wants to talk about the Decimation of mutants. She's heard about the Five Lights and clings to the hope, whereas Beast tries to talk her out of getting her expectations too high, until she finally punches him and runs away. He follows and manages to calm her down by telling her that mutant extinction does not mean that they would die any earlier than usually, but just that their children and grandchildren would be normal people. So, he tells her, all they could do was make the best of their lives so that, after all the mutants would be extinct, they would be remembered as having been worthy of their gifts.

After the Runaways went their separate ways, Molly was taken in by her grandmother, who Molly soon recognized was 'evil' even if not to the same extent as her parents. During Molly's time with her grandmother, she learned that the grandmother was her direct maternal grandmother, who had taken in Molly's father when he ran away, and carried out various genetic research to give Molly's parents their powers, accounting for how Molly's family could share the same mutant power. Molly's grandmother eventually reveals her true agenda to try and genetically recreate Molly's dead parents, but Molly rejects this idea, choosing instead to return to the Runaways.

Missing school life, Molly asked Nico to use her magic and legally enroll her in middle school. There she met a girl named Abigail, with whom she became fast friends. Eventually, Abigail confided in her that she was ageless, and gave her an enchanted cupcake once provided to her by the Enchantress which would enable Molly to stay young forever. However, while Molly was hesitant about whether or not she should accept, the cupcake was inadvertently consumed by Julie Power, who was visiting the Runaways, turning her into a 13-year-old again. The Runaways procured the antidote the Enchantress provided with the cupcakes, against Abigail's wishes, which broke their relationship.

== Powers and abilities ==
Molly's mutant power is to create a mysterious psionic aura around herself which amplifies her physical attributes without changing her mass or physiology and giving her a series of superhuman traits, including superhuman strength, with which she has toppled a giant monster bigger than a skyscraper, tunneled through miles of rock, and broken solid objects over her head. However, Molly was only able to use her powers for a limited amount of time before she became fatigued and fell asleep. When she first used her powers, Molly fell asleep after only throwing one punch, but as the series continued, Molly has been able to use her powers for increasingly longer periods of time and to greater extremes without tiring. Nico once used the Staff of One to give Molly a caffeine rush while fighting a giant monster to keep her awake longer. Moreover, Molly's pink aura have also demonstrated the ability of allowing Molly to interact with intangible or otherwise untouchable entities, such as when she pulled Cloak's cloak out of his body, something that was considered impossible.

Molly was later revealed to be able to use her pink aura for invulnerability as well, as evident when Excavator of the Wrecking Crew smashes his enchanted Asgardian shovel over Molly's head, causing the shovel to crack into pieces and causing no damage to Molly. Despite the fact that Molly's mutation is entirely different from her telepathic parents, her eyes still glow a violet-pink when using her powers, just like her parents'.

== Reception ==
=== Critical reception ===
AJ Zender of ComicsVerse said, "Molly Hayes can represent many things to every reader. I attached to her positivity as I was reading through RUNAWAYS for the first time. At the heart of her story are key themes of self-reflection and community. As the youngest member of the team, Molly Hayes shows younger readers that they have skills to add to any situation. For readers of any age, though, Molly represents a mindset of smiling through the pain. Even after her parents’ betrayal, even after all of the turmoil in her life, Molly Hayes stands as a bright icon amidst a team of moody teens. She stands up for her friends in every instance, and that makes her worth your time and energy."

=== Accolades ===
- In 2018, WhatCulture ranked Molly Hayes 1st in their "The Runaways: Every Character Ranked Worst To Best" list.
- In 2019, CBR.com ranked Molly Hayes 4th in their "10 Most Powerful Members of The Runaways" list.
- In 2020, Scary Mommy included Molly Hayes in their "195+ Marvel Female Characters Are Truly Heroic" list.
- In 2021, CBR.com ranked Molly Hayes 9th in their "10 Strongest Female Marvel Protagonists" list and 19th in their "20 Strongest Female Superheroes" list.
- In 2022, Screen Rant included Molly Hayes in their "10 Best Female Superheroes & Villains Like She-Hulk" list.
- In 2022, CBR.com ranked Molly Hayes 1st in their "10 Funniest Kids In Comics" list and 7th in their "10 Cutest Marvel Heroes" list.

== Other versions ==
=== Battle of the Atom ===
An adult version of Molly Hayes appears as a member of a future team of X-Men in the X-Men 50th Anniversary crossover, Battle of the Atom. Led by Kate Pryde, these X-Men arrive from their time to inform the present day X-Men that the original five X-Men must return to their proper place in time, as their presence in the current timeline will result in disastrous consequences for mutantkind. This team is eventually revealed, following the arrival of their era's true team of X-Men, to be, in actuality, their timeline's version of the Brotherhood of Mutants, with Kate Pryde revealed to actually be Raze, the son of Wolverine and Mystique. As an adult, Molly has grown into a tall, muscular woman and appears to have outgrown the chronic fatigue she formerly exhibited after using her powers. She also harbors a grudge against her timeline's Colossus as a result of the event which originally splintered the two teams.

=== Secret Wars ===
During Secret Wars under the Battleworld banner, Molly makes a cameo in A-Force as a resident of the Battleworld domain of Arcadia. A version of her from Battleworld's Kingdom of Manhattan is featured as a major character in the alternative version of the Battleworld version of the Runaways.

== In other media ==
=== Television ===
A character based on Molly Hayes named Molly Hayes Hernandez appears in Runaways (2017), portrayed by Allegra Acosta. Due to Fox owning the rights to the X-Men and the term "mutant", she is depicted as a mutate, with her powers originating from strange rocks her parents had studied prior.

=== Video games ===
- Molly Hayes appears as a playable character in Marvel: Avengers Alliance.
- Molly Hayes appears as a playable character in Lego Marvel Super Heroes 2 as part of the "Runaways" DLC.
