= Old Lace (comics) =

Fictional dinosaur from Runaways

- Old Lace and Gertrude Yorkes as depicted in Runaways #14 (June 2004). Art by Jo Chen.

Publication information
- Publisher: Marvel Comics
- First appearance: Runaways #2 (August 2003)
- Created by: Brian K. Vaughan; Adrian Alphona

In-story information
- Species: Genetically-engineered Deinonychus
- Team affiliations: Runaways
- Partnerships: Gertrude Yorkes; Chase Stein; Alex Wilder
- Abilities: Good Intelligence; Razor-sharp claws

Old Lace (often nicknamed as OL) is a super-powered fictional dinosaur character appearing in American comic books published by Marvel Comics.

Old Lace appeared in the Hulu television series Runaways which is set in the Marvel Cinematic Universe.

== Publication history ==
Old Lace was created by Brian K. Vaughan and artist Adrian Alphona and debuted attacking the other characters in Runaways #2. Old Lace was given her name by Gertrude Yorkes after she had taken the code name Arsenic, making the pair Arsenic and Old Lace, which is a reference to a movie and play of the same name. Old Lace had originally belonged to Gert's parents. The dinosaur was genetically engineered to obey all of Gertrude's commands, meaning whenever Gert thought or felt something, so would the dinosaur. Initially believed to be a Velociraptor, she is later correctly identified as a Deinonychus by Victor Mancha. Due to the psychic link that they share, Gertrude and Old Lace share emotions and physical pain such that if Old Lace had a cut, or was injured (which is often), Gert would have to endure her pain. After the death of Gert, the psychic link was transferred to Chase Stein.

In honor of "Pet Week", a celebration of all the Marvel Universe animals, several animal debut issues were available for free on Marvel's digital comics. Runaways #3 (June 2003), Old Lace's debut, was available to read for free on Friday, April 10, 2009.

== Character biography ==
=== Initial appearance ===
Old Lace was genetically engineered in the 87th century, the project being commissioned by Dale and Stacey Yorkes, the parents of Gertrude. At the parents request, the designer also put in several character traits which included a tele-empathic bond with Gertrude as well as being incapable of harming any of her immediate family, as discovered when Gertrude orders Old Lace to attack her parents and Old Lace refuses. Old Lace was originally intended to be part of Gert's inheritance for when her parents died but Gertrude and the rest of the Runaways stumble upon her while searching the Yorkes' basement for the body of a girl that they had witnessed their parents sacrificing.

=== As a Runaway ===
Old Lace has a telepathic bond with Gert. This lets her feel each other's thoughts and pain, and allows Old Lace to act on Gert's emotions. Old Lace got her name from Gert Yorkes, who had temporarily been using "Arsenic" as her codename (essentially making the pair Arsenic and Old Lace, after the play and film of the same name). Though Gertrude later dropped the codename after deciding that some things from her parents (such as her real name) were worth keeping, Old Lace's name stuck. During their final encounter with The Pride Old Lace was briefly under the control of Alex Wilder while Gertrude was unconscious, but Gertrude quickly took control back when she came to. Seconds before Gert's death, she was able to pass her telepathic link with Old Lace to her boyfriend Chase Stein, since her death would have killed Lace as well via their telepathic link. Even though Old Lace has a telepathic bond with Chase now, she has been shown to have some free will. This is first shown when Old Lace attacks a strong guy named Topher, despite Gertrude telling her to stop and again when Chase ties Nico up and Old Lace growls and tries to stop Chase.

=== Apparent death ===
Chase, after his girlfriend's death, has been using Old Lace in a much more angry and aggressive manner, even going so far as to command Old Lace to rip an enemy's throat out; though eventually was called off by Chase after being scolded by Nico. Old Lace later went on to follow Chase but when ordered to hurt Karolina as well as Nico, Old Lace showed her own will by greeting them warmly.

In Runaways (vol. 3) #11, the first issue written by Kathryn Immonen and drawn by Sara Pichelli, Chase, Nico, Victor and Karolina hold a house prom. An outside source manages to send a UAV flying into the Runaways' Malibu home, in the upstairs living room where Klara and Old Lace lie. Nico, Victor and Karolina rush to save Klara and Old Lace - upon arriving at the top, however, it's revealed that Old Lace had heard the UAV coming but had only enough time to shield Klara with her body. Old Lace succeeds in protecting Klara but dies as a result.

Years later, Avengers Academy revealed that Old Lace had in fact merely been transported to another dimension where she was alive and well, and she was rescued by the rest of the team. However she is not well since she has not seen Chase and is not eating food.

=== Reunion ===
Old Lace is eventually reunited with the team when Chase is able to go back and rescue Gert from the moment of her death, bringing Gert into the present so that Nico can heal her injuries. Old Lace swiftly returns to her old bond with Gert.

== Powers and abilities ==
Despite being a normal dinosaur, Old Lace possesses an enhanced level of intelligence. In the first volume Old Lace had followed Gertrude and the group while they were traveling throughout Los Angeles after they discovered the dinosaur in her parents basement. She defeated the super hero Dagger with ease, because of her immunity to her light daggers. She was also useful when they first clashed with the Pride taking down the Steins, and in their second battle when she defeated Mr. Hayes, and in their last battle with the Pride she was helpful in taking down Karolina's parents. It is also worth noting that she took down some of the Wrecking Crew. And while under Chase's leadership she has shown the intelligence in leaving a urine trail to be found on purpose and maneuvering on the side of a building to save Chase's life by sliding down the wall with her claws. The smell has been exhibited to attract masses of buzzing flies.

Old Lace's claws are also shown to be incredibly sharp, to a point where she can break through and hold onto a wall.

== Relationship with other Runaways ==
=== Gertrude ===
Gert discovered that she had a telepathic bond to Old Lace when the dinosaur halted from attacking the Runaways because Gert yelled out "NO!" in fear. In one of the Runaways' early encounters with the Pride, Gert also discovered she had an empathic bond to Old Lace when she experienced the same pain Old Lace felt. Gert's telepathic bond to Old Lace allowed her to directly communicate with the dinosaur and command it to do anything she wished. The bond worked both ways, enabling Old Lace to transfer her thoughts directly to Gert, but Old Lace could not give commands to Gert in the same fashion. Old Lace was unconditionally loyal to Gert, even to the point of fighting against the team; Old Lace once lashed out at Nico without Gert's orders when Gert and Nico had their brief falling out. Gert and Old Lace's empathic bond allows them to share more than just thoughts, but physical pain as well. If Gertrude were to be hurt, Old Lace would feel the pain and vice versa. This is the reason why in Runaways (vol. 2) #7, Gert refuses to fight Swarm because she is allergic to bee stings and posits that even one sting on her could end the both of them.

=== Chase ===
At the moment of Gertrude's death, she transfers her psychic link with Old Lace to her boyfriend Chase. From this moment, Old Lace becomes loyal to Chase. Chase uses Old Lace much more aggressively than Gertrude did, ordering her to rip an enemy's throat out. However, Old Lace does not follow Chase's order quite as well as she followed those of Gert. Old Lace sometimes protests and Chase has to remind her that he is in charge of her now. Just as with Gertrude, the psychic link with Chase shares the same disadvantage in that if either is injured, they will both share the pain.

=== Alex ===
Alex was the original leader of the Runaways. He learned of Old Lace's existence before even Gertrude and masterminded a plan for her to stumble upon Old Lace seemingly accidentally. During the final battle with The Pride, Gertrude tells Old Lace that if anything happens to her, OL should obey Alex's commands. However, Gertrude is unaware that Alex is the team's traitor and is actually working for The Pride. Alex sees to it that Gertrude is knocked out and assumes control over Old Lace. Old Lace follows Alex until Gertrude revives and immediately takes control of Old Lace again and has the dinosaur turn against Alex.

== Other versions ==
An alternate universe variant of Old Lace appears in Marvel Zombies vs. The Army of Darkness, where she is eaten by the zombified Runaways.

== In other media ==
=== Television ===
Old Lace appears in the Hulu series Runaways, set in the Marvel Cinematic Universe. This version is a contemporary creation of the Yorkes who Molly initially discovers in the basement where the Yorkes keep their other animals. Gert later discovers her and realizes that she reacts to her commands, something that surprises her parents. After bonding with her, Gert finally names her Old Lace after seeing the name on a poster advertising classic films.

=== Video games ===
- Old Lace appears as an unlockable character in Marvel Heroes.
- Old Lace, alongside Chase Stein, appears as an unlockable playable character in Marvel Avengers Alliance.
- Old Lace appears in Lego Marvel Super Heroes 2.
- Old Lace appears in Marvel Puzzle Quest.
