= Adrian Alphona =

Canadian comic book artist

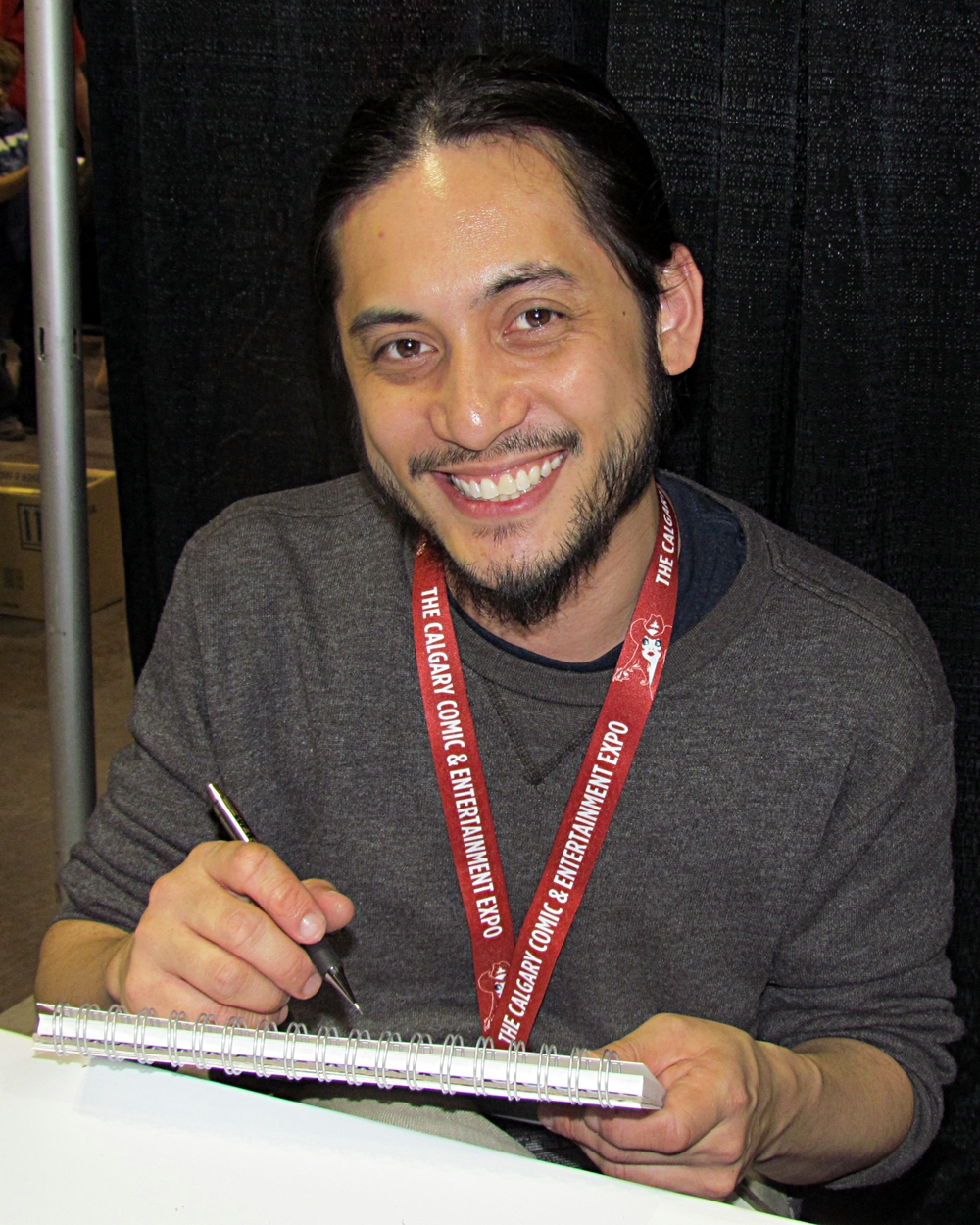
- Alphona at the Calgary Comic & Entertainment Expo in 2012
- Area: Artist
- Notable works: Runaways

Adrian Alphona is a Filipino-Canadian comic book artist best known for his work on Marvel Comics' Runaways, which he co-created with writer Brian K. Vaughan.

Slated to be pencilling the second volume of Spider-Man Loves Mary Jane when writer Terry Moore took over writing duties from Sean McKeever, Alphona instead chose to leave comics entirely, only supplying the covers for the new series, whilst art duties were handed over to Craig Rousseau. However, Alphona made a return to comics in June 2009, doing art for the Captain Britain and MI: 13 annual. He later drew Uncanny X-Force alongside Ron Garney.

In August 2013, Marvel Comics premiered the monthly series Ms. Marvel, with Alphona as artist and G. Willow Wilson as writer.
