= Reptil =

- Reptil as depicted in Avengers: The Initiative: Featuring Reptil (March 2009). Art by Steve Uy.

Publication information
- Publisher: Marvel Comics
- First appearance: Avengers: The Initiative Featuring Reptil
- Created by: Christos Gage; Steve Uy

In-story information
- Alter ego: Humberto Lopez
- Species: Human
- Team affiliations: Avengers: The Initiative; Avengers Academy
- Abilities: Via bone medallion: Minimal empathic senses Ability to turn any part of his body into any part of a dinosaur's body

Reptil (Humberto Lopez) is a superhero appearing in American comic books published by Marvel Comics. He is best known as a supporting member on The Super Hero Squad Show and a member of the Avengers Academy in the comics.

== Publication history ==
Reptil first appeared in the one-shot comic Avengers: The Initiative: Featuring Reptil. The character was created by Christos Gage and Steve Uy. Reptil was a regular character in all 39 issues of Avengers Academy from 2010 to 2013. The character also appeared in Avengers Arena, a series by Dennis Hopeless and Kev Walker for Marvel NOW!. The character's role in comics was revisited in the 2021 one-shot King in Black: Spider-Man, where Reptil served as a supporting character. In the same year, Reptil was featured in a self-titled limited series written by Terry Blas and penciled by Enid Balám.

== Fictional character biography ==
Humberto Lopez is a young boy who had registered with the Fifty State Initiative and was living with his grandfather. When S.H.I.E.L.D. scientist Valerie Cooper was putting together a squad to go after Stegron in his plot to reanimate dinosaur fossils, Tigra was placed in charge of the squad and was told to recruit Humberto to help them. Tigra was worried since Humberto had not gone through training yet. When going after Stegron, Humberto explained about his parents and how he got his powers.

His parents, Isaac and Jessica, were palaeontologists who dug up a crystallized bone when he was with them in the desert. The medallion had a strange energy that was related to dinosaurs. Under the codename Reptil, Humberto used it to obtain the abilities of any dinosaur by thinking of it, and even had the empathy to sense dinosaurs and other reptiles.

Upon arrival in Camp Hammond, Reptil undergoes training over the course of several days. He tells Tigra that his parents disappeared a year ago on a dig and that he wants to become a hero to find them.

With the help of Baron Von Blitzschlag, who creates a device to enhance Reptil's powers, the team locates Stegron. When discovering that he and his dinosaur herd are going to attack a S.H.I.E.L.D. base in South Dakota, Tigra's group intercepts them. However, Stegron controls Komodo's mind and told her to attack her teammates. Reptil acts hot-headed during the fight and attacks Stegron, but is beaten down. Stegron and his dinosaur herd escape. Reptil suffers a mild concussion and Valerie Cooper tells him that his rash behavior allowed Stegron to escape, and he endangered the lives of his teammates. Tigra speaks to Cooper in private and asks her to give Humberto one more chance to go out on the field. Valerie tells Tigra that if Reptil messes up, then his career with the Initiative will be over. Tigra speaks to Humberto a few days later and reminds him to stay balanced and not to over-commit. She tells him that everyone has problems and that he is lucky enough to be in a position to learn from other's mistakes and his own.

When Stegron attacks another S.H.I.E.L.D. base in Wyoming, his force of dinosaurs is taken down by a combination of good teamwork and Reptil's abilities. It turns out that Stegron was attacking various S.H.I.E.L.D. bases to capture Moon-Boy and gain control of Devil Dinosaur. Reptil tells Tigra that Moon-Boy is innocent and does not deserve this. Tigra tells the S.H.I.E.L.D. scientists and agents that Moon-Boy was eaten by one of the dinosaurs, and Reptil was sent home because he got in the way and was completely useless.

In reality, Reptil managed to fly out with Moon-Boy and take him back to his home to Nevada. Tigra meets Humberto there and they are soon greeted by Ka-Zar and his pet Smilodon Zabu. Ka-Zar thanks Tigra and Reptil for bringing Moon-Boy back to him safely and invites Reptil to take Moon-Boy back to the Savage Land. After Moon-Boy is reunited with Devil Dinosaur, Ka-Zar tells Reptil that he will help him find his parents.

=== Heroic Age ===
Soon after this as part of the Heroic Age event, Reptil is captured and taken to a government facility. Under the orders of Norman Osborn, Reptil is subjected to experiments in an attempt to see if enough stress would allow him to fully transform into a dinosaur. As agents of H.A.M.M.E.R. begin destroying evidence about Osborn's projects, Reptil manages to escape the facility. He is approached by Justice and Hank Pym who invite him to become part of the Avengers Academy.

Along with the other students, all of them having been somehow affected by Norman Osborn, Reptil is told that they are the most promising of the heroes Osborn sought out. During their first training session, the students notice the staff arguing about them. By accessing secret computer files, the students realize that, rather than because they showed promise, they have been chosen for the academy because the staff believes they have the greatest potential to go rogue and become supervillains.

During a battle, Mentallo takes control of Reptil's mind and forces him to fly headfirst towards the ground. The threat of imminent death allows Reptil to fully transform into a dinosaur. This saves Reptil's life because Mentallo cannot control his mind. However, Reptil cannot control himself in this form either. His teachers think that his tendency to repress his troubles instead of dealing with them is the reason for his lack of control. They want him to accept help, but he is reluctant to talk to staff of the academy. Since the best superhuman therapist Doc Samson is gone, they ask Jessica Jones to talk to him. He opens up to her and they talk about many of the things that have been troubling him including his parents, but he keeps his concerns about his fellow students and the academy itself private.

When Korvac returns, Reptil and his fellow studies are placed into future versions of their bodies by Korvac's estranged lover, Carina, to fight him. After Korvac is defeated, Reptil finds himself trapped in his older body. On a day trip to New York, the students encounter Arcade, during which Reptil meets Spider-Girl, and they quickly become friends. Spider-Girl attends Academy's "prom night". When she tells him that she liked him the way he was, Reptil then decides to revert to his teenage body.

After the battle with Korvac he convinces Tigra to allow him and the team to fight Electro. It turns out the entire Sinister Six was with him and they easily defeat the students. Reptil blames himself. He develops great leadership skills and is able to guide the team against Absorbing Man and Titania's attack on the Infinite Mansion during the Fear Itself storyline, especially now that since his connection with his future self, he can fully transform into a dinosaur without losing control.

Later, Reptil's mind is switched again with his future self. His future self attempts to help Hybrid take over the school in order to ensure a future timeline will exist where he and Finesse have a child. However, his future self cannot cope with the guilt of killing fellow students, so he contacts Veil and Jocasta, who are able to defeat Hybrid. It is hinted that this particular timeline might still have been saved.

=== Avengers Vs. X-Men ===
During the Avengers vs. X-Men storyline, Reptil and the students initially do not take kindly to the junior X-Men, but eventually come to understand the difficult situation that the mutants were forced into by adult superheroes, not unlike their present situation. When Sebastian Shaw attempts to free the mutants, the Avengers Academy students side with them, so Tigra feints defeats and allows them to escape. He and the students defend Juston Seyfert's Sentinel from a Phoenix Force-powered Emma Frost.

=== Final Exams ===
Reptil and White Tiger are de-powered by Jeremy Briggs when he steals their amulets. Only once they mentally communicate with their amulets and vow to die to fulfill their destinies, do the amulets fall from Coat of Arms's hands. Once re-powered, they are able to defeat Briggs and the Young Masters. He and the rest of the students are graduated to associate Avengers. In the final issue, he and White Tiger are shown to be romantically involved.

=== Avengers Arena ===
In the series Avengers Arena, Reptil, Mettle, and Hazmat are abducted from the Academy by Arcade. Reptil is badly injured by a flame attack from an unknown assailant. Hazmat and X-23 try to bring Reptil to the edge of quadrant 2 to get medical supplies for Reptil's burns. At that point, Reptil wakes up and Hazmat is overjoyed. When Hazmat and X-23 tell Reptil that Chase Stein attacked him, Reptil clears Chase's reputation, saying that Death Locket had attacked him. While Reptil and the other teens camp on the beach, Cullen Bloodstone confronts him about camping while a war is going on elsewhere. Cammi interjects to agree with Cullen before saying she is heading out to either find Nico Minoru or avenge her. As chaos ensues in Murderworld, Anachronism attacks X-23, only to be attacked by Reptil. As Hazmat is close to exploding, Reptil swims her out to sea so that the explosion cannot harm anyone. The explosion causes everyone to stop fighting each other. When the surviving teens are rescued, Reptil is fished out of the water by a S.H.I.E.L.D. agent. After recuperating from the explosion, Reptil is recruited into a new program that is intended to replace the defunct S.H.I.E.L.D.

=== Solo series ===
Following the events of Outlawed, superheroes under the age of twenty-one have been made illegal, forcing Reptil and his grandfather Vincente to move in with his aunt Gloria Quintero and twin cousins Eva and Julian. As they prepare for an upcoming Mexican heritage event, Reptil faces off against a new villain named Megalith who has the answers to what happened to his parents. Eva is revealed to be a witch in training, via online courses, while Julian creates a new outfit for Reptil to face new threats. It is also implied that Reptil is now in a relationship with Anya Corazon.

== Powers and abilities ==
Reptil wears a crystallized bone medallion that allows him to take on the abilities of different dinosaurs just by thinking about them. He initially cannot fully transform into a complete dinosaur, but can shape-shift various parts of his body into different dinosaur appendages like a tail to strike enemies, changing his arms into pterodactyl wings, or having claws like a Velociraptor. However, after briefly possessing the body of his future self in a fight against Korvac, he retains the ability to fully transform into a dinosaur. He possesses the strength and ability of whatever dinosaur he is using, and his skin turns red and scaly whenever he uses his abilities. He is also capable of healing much faster from deadly injuries when he is in a dinosaur form.

Reptil also has some empathy abilities with dinosaurs. He can sense other reptiles, but he cannot control them or influence their behavior at this time.

His amulet is magical in nature and embedded into his chest. Not much is known about it except that it is not the source of his powers, but only the catalyst that allows him to use them.

== In other media ==
=== Television ===
- Reptil appears in The Super Hero Squad Show, voiced by Antony Del Rio. This version is a junior member of the eponymous group whose medallion is an Infinity Fractal that was sent back in time and renders him immune to other Fractals' powers. Throughout the first season, Reptil assists the squad in collecting Infinity Fractals and fighting Doctor Doom and his Lethal Legion until the squad discover the truth about Reptil's powers. He eventually gives up his medallion to rebuild the Infinity Sword, but his prolonged exposure to the medallion enables him to retain its abilities innately.
- Reptil appears in Marvel Super Hero Adventures: Frost Fight!, voiced again by Antony Del Rio.
- Reptil appears in Marvel Super Hero Adventures, voiced by Jesse Inocalla. This version turns green whenever he uses any of his dinosaur transformations.
- Reptil appears in Spidey and His Amazing Friends, voiced initially by Hoku Ramirez and later by Ryan Anderson Lopez. This version sports a blue hair streak and similarly colored dinosaur forms, and he also transforms in a flash of light instead of physically morphing into the selected dinosaur. Additionally, he can give his abilities to others, enabling them to assume a singular dinosaur form.

=== Video games ===
- Reptil appears in Marvel Super Hero Squad: The Infinity Gauntlet, voiced again by Antony Del Rio.
- Reptil appears as a playable character in Marvel Super Hero Squad Online, voiced again by Antony Del Rio.
- Reptil appears in Marvel Super Hero Squad: Comic Combat, voiced again by Antony Del Rio.
- Reptil appears as a playable character in Lego Marvel's Avengers, voiced again by Antony Del Rio.

== Collected Editions ==
Title	Material Collected	Published Date	ISBN
Avengers: The Initiative - Disassembled	Avengers: The Initiative Featuring Reptil and Avengers: The Initiative #20-25	December 9, 2009	978-0785131687
Avengers: The Initiative - The Complete Collection Vol. 2	Avengers: The Initiative Featuring Reptil and Avengers: The Initiative #20-35, Avengers: The Initiative Special	August 16, 2017	978-1302906870
Reptil: Brink of Extinction	Reptil #1-4 and Avengers: The Initiative Featuring Reptil	December 7, 2021	978-1302930172
