= Cullen Bloodstone =

Bloodstone
- Cullen Bloodstone as depicted in Avengers Arena #6 (May 2013). Art by Kev Walker.

Publication information
- Publisher: Marvel Comics
- First appearance: Avengers Arena #1 (December 2012)
- Created by: Dennis Hopeless; Kev Walker

In-story information
- Full name: Cullen Bloodstone
- Species: Human (empowered)
- Team affiliations: Braddock Academy
- Abilities: Superhuman strength Healing factor Glartrox transformation

Cullen Bloodstone is a character appearing in American comic books published by Marvel Comics. The character was created by Dennis Hopeless and Kev Walker, and first appeared in Avengers Arena #1 (December 2012). Cullen is the son of Ulysses Bloodstone and brother of Elsa Bloodstone, both monster hunters.

== Publication history ==
Bloodstone first appeared in issue #1 of the Avengers Arena series as part of the Marvel NOW! event, and was created by Dennis Hopeless and Kev Walker.

Cullen Bloodstone appears as one of the main characters in Avengers Undercover beginning in 2014.

== Fictional character biography ==
Cullen Bloodstone is the son of Ulysses Bloodstone and the younger brother of Elsa Bloodstone. When Cullen is 10, Ulysses takes him to the dimension Klimtor and leaves him there to prove his worth as a Bloodstone. Ulysses plans to retrieve Cullen the next day, but is killed by the Conspirators, resulting in Cullen being trapped in the dimension for over two years. While in Klimtor, Cullen is possessed by the Glartrox, a parasitic monster. After being rescued by Elsa, Cullen is given a Bloodstone ring to suppress the Glartrox and begins attending Braddock Academy.

In Avengers Arena, Cullen is one of sixteen teenagers kidnapped by Arcade, who forces them to fight to the death in Murderworld. After being separated from the others by an earthquake, Cullen, Nara, and Anachronism conclude that Apex is manipulating Death Locket and Kid Briton. Arcade teleports the three to a supply cache as Apex, Death Locket, and Kid Briton arrive. Nara and Apex start arguing and Apex confirms that she ordered Death Locket to attack Nara. Kid Briton tries to intervene as Nara calls him a "weak puppet". Kid Briton attempts to kill Nara for insulting him, but is killed by Anachronism.

Cullen, Cammi, Anachronism, and Nara are separated from Reptil, Hazmat, and X-23. Anachronism and Nara are attacked by a feral X-23 as Nara reveals to Anachronism that she believes Cullen is gay and in love with him. Cullen decides to take off his ring and fight X-23 in his unstable Glartrox form. Cullen successfully defeats X-23, but is now wild and out of control. Nara retrieves the ring and returns Cullen to normal, but dies from her wounds.

In Avengers Undercover, Cullen heads to Bagalia to infiltrate the Masters of Evil and find Arcade. Death Locket, Chase Stein, Hazmat, Cammi, and Anachronism follow him there. While escaping Arcade's mansion, the team is captured by S.H.I.E.L.D., but are "rescued" by Daimon Hellstrom and returned to Bagalia. Helmut Zemo invites the teens to join the Masters of Evil, with Cullen accepting. Hellstrom uses a Hellfire Halo to control Cullen's Glartrox form into fighting Anachronism. However, Cullen resists Hellstrom's control and kisses Anachronism, to the latter's surprise.

In the series Excalibur, Cullen Bloodstone buys the Warwolves from the zoo where they were imprisoned and enlists the members of Excalibur to kill them. The group successfully kills the Warwolves, but Betsy Braddock discovers that one of the Warwolves had a young pup, which she gives to Rachel Summers as a pet.

In the 2021 storyline The Death of Doctor Strange, Elsa Bloodstone reunites with her sister Lyra Bloodstone, who helps Cullen gain control of his Glartrox transformation. Cullen, no longer wanting the Glartrox bonded to him, has Elsa and Lyra exorcise the Glartrox from his body and return it to its home dimension.

== Powers and abilities ==
Cullen Bloodstone's abilities are derived from the Bloodstone ring, which gives him a healing factor and superhuman strength, durability, and agility. The ring also prevents Cullen from transforming into a Glartrox, an otherdimensional creature that feeds on its host's soul and emotions. With help from Daimon Hellstrom and Anachronism, Cullen gains the ability to suppress the Glartrox with his willpower and partially transform at will.
