= Alex Wilder =

Marvel Comics superhero

- Alex Wilder and the Abstract. Artwork by Jo Chen.

Publication information
- Publisher: Marvel Comics
- First appearance: Runaways (vol. 1) #1 (July 2003)
- Created by: Brian K. Vaughan (writer); Adrian Alphona (artist)

In-story information
- Alter ego: Alex Wilder
- Team affiliations: Runaways; The Pride; Young Masters
- Notable aliases: A-Wild; Youngblood
- Abilities: Skilled logician and leader; High-level intellect

Alex Wilder is a fictional character appearing in American comic books published by Marvel Comics. The character is introduced in the series Runaways.

Alex Wilder was portrayed by Rhenzy Feliz in the Hulu television series Runaways, which is connected to the Marvel Cinematic Universe.

== Publication history ==
Alex Wilder was created by author Brian K. Vaughan and artist Adrian Alphona and debuted in Runaways #1 with most of the other main characters. Like every member of the original Runaways, he is the son of villains with special abilities; in Alex's case, gang mob bosses. Alex is the team's de facto leader in the title's first volume. Unlike the rest of the team, Alex does not possess powers of any kind but is a child prodigy in the fields of logic and strategy. Alex eventually reveals that he is the parents' mole, and is killed by the Gibborim. Long after his death, Alex was resurrected in the series Avengers Undercover.

== Fictional character biography ==
Alex is the first character to be introduced in the series. He is the son of Geoffrey Wilder and Catherine Wilder. Alex suggests spying on their parents' supposed charity organization. After witnessing their parents' (who were revealed to be a secret crime ring called "the Pride") murder of an innocent teenage girl, Alex organizes the mass escape from their parents. Alex then obtains the Yorkes' copy of The Abstract, a magical book that records the past, present, and future deeds of the Pride. After a few fights with their parents, Alex and the Runaways escape to Chase's dilapidated mansion hideout called "the Hostel". The group vows to work together and take down their parents' organization. The majority of the group (with the exception of Alex) decide to take superhero codenames for themselves as they become vigilantes.

Alex distances himself emotionally from many of the Runaways, even refusing to take a codename or bond with the rest of the team. Alex spends most of his time deciphering the Abstract, presumably plotting how he will carry out his plan to save his parents from the Dean and Hayes couples. Since he expected that all the other Runaways would die in a few months time, he limited his emotional connection to them.

Alex eventually deciphers the Abstract and reveals that the Pride works for the Gibborim, three monstrous giants who require the sacrifice of twenty-five innocent souls over twenty-five years to gain enough power to destroy Earth and restore it to the paradise it once was. Alex determines the location for the yearly sacrificial rite and convinces the Runaways that the rite would be the best place to launch an assault.

Alex reveals that he had known about the Pride for over a year. He intends to take down the entire Pride, but save his parents, thus securing them seats in the paradise the Gibborim had promised. Alex tries to give the remaining three seats to Nico Minoru and her parents, but Nico refuses and Alex quickly loses control over the situation. Molly Hayes destroys the Gibborim's newest sacrifice, which leads the Gibborim to kill Alex.

Alex Wilder in white

In the series Avengers Undercover, Alex is resurrected by Daimon Hellstrom to become Nico's teacher in battle strategy, and to help her cope with her increased dark magical powers. Alex later joins the villainous team Young Masters. Alex reappears in the series Power Man and Iron Fist, where he spreads a demonic drug called Redemption.

== Powers and abilities ==
Alex Wilder has a high-level intellect, being in the gifted area in accordance with Marvel's Power Grid, and is a skilled logician and leader. Due to his time in Hell, he learned how to understand magic. At one point, he even fused himself with a demon so he could use the magic. Being returned from the dead also gave him added abilities, such as that he no longer needs to eat or sleep, and contact with his skin causes the feeling of touching a corpse.

== Reception ==
- In 2020, CBR.com ranked Alex Wilder 5th in their "Marvel: 10 Famous Villains From The 2000s To Bring Back" list.

== In other media ==
- Alex Wilder appears in Runaways (2017), portrayed by Rhenzy Feliz. This version is more noble and determined to lock his parents away for their crimes, but at the cost of becoming distant from his friends.
- Alex Wilder appears as a playable character in Lego Marvel Super Heroes 2 as part of the "Runaways" DLC.
