= Young Masters =

Marvel Comics supervillain team

Publication information
- Publisher: Marvel Comics
- First appearance: Dark Reign: Young Avengers #1 (May 2009)
- Created by: Paul Cornell; Mark Brooks

In-story information
- Base(s): Constrictor's Snakepit, Bagalia
- Member(s): Current Roster: Melter (Leader); Enchantress; Executioner; Coat of Arms; Egghead; Black Knight; Mako; Radioactive Kid; Excavator; Alex Wilder; Mudbug; Snot

The Young Masters are a supervillain team appearing in American comic books published by Marvel Comics. The team was created by Paul Cornell and Mark Brooks. The team first appeared in Dark Reign: Young Avengers #1 (May 2009) as the analog to the Young Avengers.

== Publication history ==
Dark Reign: Young Avengers is a limited series written by Paul Cornell and drawn by Mark Brooks, which introduces a new group of powered teens calling themselves the Young Masters, but controlled by Norman Osborn. The new team is a twisted version of the Young Avengers, much like the Dark Avengers are to the original Avengers.

== Fictional team biography ==
Originally assembled by Coat of Arms during the Dark Reign storyline, the group was largely motivated by Melter's desire to be real heroes, but hindered significantly by unclear and conflicting ideals. Only Melter and Enchantress show much interest in actual heroism. The team begins calling themselves the "Young Avengers," but are only active as superheroes a short time before being confronted by the actual Young Avengers.

Although Enchantress is a possible candidate for the original Young Avengers, she is rejected due to her history with Loki. Displeased with the Young Avengers' decision, the team decides to become the Young Masters. Executioner contacts Norman Osborn to gain his support and the backing of the Dark Avengers. The Young Masters return with Executioner and Egghead, joined by new recruits Mako, Radioactive Kid, and Black Knight in a plot to target older villains for assassination.

In Avengers Undercover, Black Knight, Coat of Arms, Egghead, Executioner, Mako, and Melter appear as members of the Masters of Evil. The Young Masters make their headquarters in Constrictor's Snakepit in Bagalia. During this time, Excavator, Snot, Mudbug, Enchantress, and Radioactive Kid are shown to have joined up with the Young Masters. At the end of the series, Alex Wilder joins the Young Masters.

== Members ==
Original members:

- Melter (Christopher Colchiss) – A mutant who can cause objects to melt. He is the team's leader.
- Enchantress (Sylvie Lushton) – She claims to be an Asgardian and utilizes magic. She is Melter's girlfriend.
- Executioner – A vigilante with no superpowers. He is the son of Princess Python.
- Big Zero (Amity Hunter) – A Neo-Nazi who can alter her size and is in a relationship with Egghead.
- Coat of Arms (Lisa Molinari) – A swordswoman whose magic coat grants her six arms.
- Egghead – A robot who wants to understand humanity.

Later recruits:

- Alex Wilder - A former member of the Runaways who was resurrected by Daimon Hellstrom.
- Black Knight - An unnamed female incarnation of the Black Knight. She deserted the Young Masters, but later returned to the group.
- Death Locket - Rebecca Ryker is the daughter of a brilliant cyberneticist who saved her life after an explosion by infusing her with Deathlok technology.
- Excavator - The teenage son of Piledriver and a temporary member of the Wrecking Crew. Excavator wields an enchanted shovel.
- Mako - An Atlantean who was grown from the cells of Attuma, Orka, Tyrak, and U-Man.
- Mudbug - A crayfish-like mutant and former student of the Hellfire Club's Hellfire Academy.
- Radioactive Kid - A young criminal in a hazmat suit who can melt and mutate human flesh with a touch. His body and eyes constantly glow, with his eyes being visible through the visor of his suit.
- Snot - A former student of Hellfire Academy. He can propel large amounts of mucus from his nose.
