= Death Locket =

- Death Locket as depicted in Avengers Arena #2 (December 2012). Art by Kev Walker (penciller), Frank Martin Jr. (inker), and Jean-François Beaulieu (colorist).

Publication information
- Publisher: Marvel Comics
- First appearance: Avengers Arena #1 (December 2012)
- Created by: Dennis Hopeless; Kev Walker

In-story information
- Alter ego: Rebecca Ryker
- Species: Human/Cyborg
- Team affiliations: Babysitters Club; Young Masters
- Abilities: Nanobionic augmentation; Superhuman strength, speed, durability, reflexes, senses, and stamina; Technoforming; Body part elongation; Hologram projection

Death Locket (Rebecca Ryker) is a character appearing in American comic books published by Marvel Comics. The character was introduced in the series Avengers Arena, where she was one of sixteen heroes captured by Arcade and forced to fight to the death.

== Publication history ==
Death Locket first appeared in issue #1 of the Avengers Arena series as part of the Marvel NOW! event, and was created by Dennis Hopeless and Kev Walker.

Death Locket appears as one of the main characters in Avengers Undercover beginning in 2014.

== Fictional character biography ==
Rebecca Ryker is one of sixteen teenagers kidnapped by Arcade, who forces them to fight each other to the death in his latest version of Murderworld. Cammi gives Rebecca the nickname "Deathlok-ette", which she mishears as "Death Locket" and adopts as a codename. Throughout the first day, Death Locket remembers the past events that led to her origins. After being maimed in an explosion that killed her mother and brother, Rebecca was rebuilt using the Deathlok technology that her father developed.

An earthquake separates Cullen Bloodstone and Anachronism from Apex, Nara, Kid Briton, and Death Locket. Death Locket goes dormant as her cybernetics take over, causing her to blast Nara off a cliff and into the ocean. Nara, Anachronism, and Cullen survive the earthquake and conclude that Apex is manipulating Death Locket and Kid Briton to her own ends.

Juston Seyfert, previously thought to have been crushed to death by his Sentinel, is revealed to have survived, but has been injured and rendered paraplegic. Distraught at the loss of his Sentinel, Juston salvages its remains and creates armor which he uses to attack Death Locket.

Apex uses Death Locket to help her kill Nico Minoru. After the Staff of One resurrects Nico, she disassembles Death Locket's cybernetic arm and traps her and Apex underground. Apex's brother Tim repairs Death Locket, who unleashes Darkhawk to attack Arcade. At Tim's request, Death Locket kills him and Apex, allowing the survivors to escape Murderworld.

=== Avengers Undercover ===
When Cullen Bloodstone goes missing, the Murderworld survivors head to Bagalia to find him. Once they find Cullen, he reveals that he enjoys life among the villains, and the others, minus Cammi, start to enjoy it as well. When Cammi tries to tell the others to leave, Cullen has Daimon Hellstrom teleport the group to Arcade's latest party so they can kill him.

After killing Arcade and escaping the mansion, the group is captured by S.H.I.E.L.D., but are "rescued" by Daimon Hellstrom. Hellstrom brings the group before Baron Zemo, who offers the group to join the Masters of Evil. After spending time with the Young Masters, every member of the group, with the exception of Cammi, accepts Zemo's offer.

Chase Stein informs Death Locket that the group never really joined the Masters of Evil and have infiltrated the group to take them down from the inside. As Excavator and Chase battle, they tell Death Locket to pick a side; in a state of panic, she shoots Chase in the chest, leaving him comatose. Over the next three months, Death Locket embraces being part of the Young Masters.

=== War of the Realms: Journey into Mystery ===
The last Norn Witch leads Balder the Brave to protect Balder's baby sister Laussa from the forces of Sindr. Death Locket and her crew, called the Babysitter's Club, travel across northern America in an effort to elude Ares, who had been contracted by Sindr to dispose of Laussa. Save for Thori, the group is unaware that Laussa is actually a receptacle for Surtur's power.

While on their cross-country road trip, Thori speculates that Laussa had been instinctively guiding her protectors and influencing their actions at certain points along the way for an as yet unknown purpose. Ares successfully captures Laussa, intending to die so he can be reunited with his son in Elysium. Sebastian Druid and others convince him otherwise, insisting he should instead help them stop the War of the Realms with the army they had inadvertently gathered.

== Powers and abilities ==
Death Locket is a cyborg with a variety of technology-based abilities. Initially, Death Locket struggles to use her cybernetic uplink to take control of the computer systems in Arcade's mansion. After several months, she has gotten better with her uplink and is able to take over a S.H.I.E.L.D. Helicarrier and pilot it single-handed, and hack into S.H.I.E.L.D.'s worldwide communication network in a matter of minutes. Death Locket can elongate her cybernetic arm and transform it into a variety of weapons, such as a blade or mace.

== Other versions ==
An alternate universe version of Death Locket appears in the "Secret Wars" tie-in "House of M". This version is a guerrilla freedom fighter against the Monarchy of M, ruled by Eric Magnus.

== In other media ==
- Death Locket appears in Marvel Avengers Alliance.
- Death Locket appears as a playable character in Lego Marvel's Avengers.
