= Cammi (character) =

Publication information
- Publisher: Marvel Comics
- First appearance: Drax the Destroyer #1 (November 2005)
- Created by: Keith Giffen (writer); Mitch Breitweiser (artist)

In-story information
- Alter ego: Camille Benally

Cammi (Camille Benally) is a character appearing in American comic books published by Marvel Comics. She was created by Keith Giffen and Mitch Breitweiser.

== Publication history ==
Cammi first appeared in Drax the Destroyer #1 (November 2005). She later appeared in the Avengers Arena series as part of the Marvel NOW! event, and as one of the main characters in Avengers Undercover beginning in 2014.

== Fictional character biography ==
Camille "Cammi" Benally was an average 10-year-old human girl with an absentee father and alcoholic, abusive mother in the small town of Coot's Bluff, Alaska. She encounters Drax the Destroyer when a prison ship containing Drax crash-lands on Earth just outside Coot's Bluff. Cammi befriends Drax and helps him protect Coot's Bluff from Paibok, Lunatik, and the Blood Brothers. A second prison ship later arrives and arrests both Drax and Cammi.

After arriving on Xandar, Cammi joins Drax, Nova and the other Guardians of the Galaxy to take on Annihilus and the Annihilation Wave. Surviving Annihilus' attack on the intergalactic prison known as the Kyln, Drax and Cammi team up with the last member of the Xandarian Nova Corps, Richard Rider. During a battle between the Annihilation Wave and the United Front, Drax stays behind to fight off the invaders while Cammi and others finish the evacuation.

=== Avengers Arena ===
Cammi is one of sixteen teenagers kidnapped by Arcade, who forces them to fight to the death in Murderworld. After Nara is killed, Nico Minoru snaps and tries to kill everyone. When Chase Stein refuses to let Cammi stop Nico, she breaks his arm and leg, then takes the Darkhawk amulet to stop Nico. Cammi returns the amulet to Chase when Apex attacks the remaining teens. Death Locket stops the fight by killing Apex, allowing the survivors to escape Murderworld.

=== Avengers Undercover ===
Once news breaks about Arcade's kidnappings, Cammi and the other Murderworld survivors become infamous. Cammi learns that her mother is alive and tries to be a good daughter by attending her mother's Alcoholics Anonymous meetings. When Anachronism reveals Cullen Bloodstone has gone missing, all the survivors head to Bagalia to find him. Once they do, Cullen reveals that he enjoys his life among the villains, and everyone, except Cammi, starts to enjoy it as well. After Hazmat kills Arcade, Nico decides to destroy Baron Zemo's organization from the inside. Cammi refuses to take part and escapes, but is captured by Constrictor and jailed. After several months, Cammi escapes prison and returns to outer space.

=== Drax ===
Cammi teams with Planet Terry to take a mercenary contract on Drax. They put aside their differences to make sure a small group of children get back to their homeworld safely. Cammi continues to fight with Drax as various situations arise. After these threats and dangers are resolved, Drax gives his current ship to Cammi, Terry, and various others he had befriended along the way and urges them to stay together as a new heroic team.

== Powers and abilities ==
Cammi is highly skilled in hand-to-hand combat, gymnastics, survival instincts, and piloting. She wears a spacesuit, and uses a jetpack, plasma pistol, and anti-personnel mines.

== In other media ==
Cammi appears in Marvel: Avengers Alliance.
