= Avengers Arena =

Marvel comic book series

- Cover of Avengers Arena #1 (December 2012). Art by Dave Johnson.

Publication information
- Publisher: Marvel Comics
- Schedule: Monthly
- Format: Ongoing series
- Genre: Superhero
- Publication date: December 2012 – 2013

Creative team
- Created by: Dennis Hopeless; Kev Walker
- Written by: Dennis Hopeless
- Artist: Kev Walker

Avengers Arena is a comic book series published by Marvel Comics that debuted in December 2012 as part of the Marvel NOW! relaunch. The series shows 16 young heroes from the Marvel Universe and pit them against each other in a kill-or-be-killed, reality-show-like scenario in Murderworld run by Arcade. The series ended with issue 18, and was followed by a sequel titled Avengers Undercover, in which the surviving characters infiltrate the Masters of Evil.

== Publication history ==
In September 2012, Marvel Comics announced that Avengers Arena would debut with a December 2012 cover date, by the creative team of Dennis Hopeless and Kev Walker. The series ran 18 issues, and was followed by a sequel series, Avengers Undercover.

The comic has a battle royale theme, notably inspired by the Japanese novel/manga/film Battle Royale and the American young adult dystopian novel/film series The Hunger Games.

== Plot ==
Sixteen teenage superheroes are abducted by supervillain Arcade, brought to his latest version of Murderworld, and forced to fight to the death for Arcade's enjoyment.

As the games begin, Red Raven tries to escape from the arena, only for her to be killed when an invisible force field breaks her neck. Rebecca Ryker faces off against Hazmat and then fights Cammi soon after. Cammi gives her the nickname Death Locket. Throughout the first day, Death Locket remembers the past events that led to her being transformed into a cyborg.

As the young heroes sleep for the night, they are stalked by an unidentified cybernetic creature.

After several days pass, Arcade shuts off the food supply and makes the weather conditions hazardous in Murderworld, but notes there are safe zones at the edge of each quadrant for the competitors to rest, as well as food and medicine in Quadrant 2. Reptil is injured by an explosion. Hazmat and X-23 take him to Quadrant 2 to get medical supplies for Reptil's burns. Nara, Anachronism, and Cullen Bloodstone discover that Apex is manipulating Death Locket and Kid Briton to her own ends. The trio is then teleported by Arcade to the supply cache at Quadrant 2 just as Apex, Death Locket, and Kid Briton arrive. The heroes begin fighting among themselves.

Juston Seyfert is revealed to have survived the attack from the cybernetic creature, but is paralyzed below the waist due to the injuries sustained when his Sentinel crashed. Distraught at the loss of the Sentinel, Juston salvages its remains and creates a suit of battle armor which he uses to attack Death Locket. After being injured by Apex, Nico Minoru sacrifices herself by staying behind to get the survivors to safety. She is killed by Chase Stein and Juston Seyfert's Sentinel, both of whom are under Apex's control.

Reptil turns into a sea dinosaur in order to hunt some sharks for him and Hazmat to eat. The remaining teenage heroes catch up to them and are invited to have shark steaks with them before returning to Murderworld. Molly Hayes notices that Nico and Chase are missing and turns to Hank Pym for help.

Cullen Bloodstone attacks Anachronism, forcing Cammi to try to calm him down. Hazmat and X-23 encounter a Mettle robot with Trigger Scent, causing X-23 to go on the attack. X-23 seriously injures Hazmat, leaving her fate unknown. Cammi attempts to stop X-23, but her attempts are useless. Cullen decides only he can stop her. Upon removing his family's ring, Cullen transforms into a monstrous form in order to save them. As Cullen continues to fight X-23, Cammi, Nara and Anachronism look for Cullen's ring. Nara ends up diving into the ocean to find it. Nara emerges from the ocean with the ring, but is killed by Cullen.

Apex uses her ability to take over Death Locket's systems and plans to become Queen of Murderworld. As Hazmat is close to exploding, Reptil swims her out to sea so that the explosion cannot harm anyone. The explosion causes everyone to stop fighting each other. Death Locket kills Apex and shuts down Murderworld. Afterwards, the surviving teenagers are rescued by S.H.I.E.L.D., Wolverine, Hank Pym, and Captain Britain.

== Characters ==
Character	Real name	Team Affiliation	Death
Hazmat	Jennifer Takeda	Avengers Academy	
Mettle	Ken Mack	Avengers Academy	Killed by Arcade in Avengers Arena #1.
Reptil	Humberto Lopez	Avengers Academy	
Darkhawk	Christopher Powell	N/A	M.I.A. in Avengers Arena #3. Corpse was later shown in issue #12. Revealed to be alive in issue #16.
Anachronism	Aiden	Braddock Academy	
Apex	Katy Bashir and Tim Bashir	Braddock Academy	Killed by Death Locket in Avengers Arena #18.
Cullen Bloodstone		Braddock Academy	
Kid Briton	Brian Braddock	Braddock Academy	Killed by Anachronism in issue #6.
Nara		Braddock Academy	Killed by Cullen Bloodstone in issue #15.
Cammi	Camille Benally	N/A	
Chase Stein		Runaways	
Nico Minoru		Runaways	Killed by Apex controlling Darkhawk in Avengers Arena #10. Resurrected by her Staff of One in issue #12.
Death Locket	Rebecca Ryker	N/A	
Juston Seyfert		N/A	Killed by Apex in Avengers Arena #9.
Red Raven	Dania	N/A	Killed upon colliding with the invisible force-field in issue #2.
X-23	Laura Kinney	X-Men	

== Collected editions ==
#	Title	Material collected	Pages	Publication date	ISBN
1	Kill or Die	Avengers Arena #1-6	144	May 21, 2013	978-0785166573
2	Game On	Avengers Arena #7-12	144	September 24, 2013	978-0785166580
3	Boss Level	Avengers Arena #13-18	136	February 4, 2014	978-0785189282
The Complete Collection		Avengers Arena #1-18	408	September 11, 2018	978-1302911850
