= Kris Anka =

American comics artist and inker

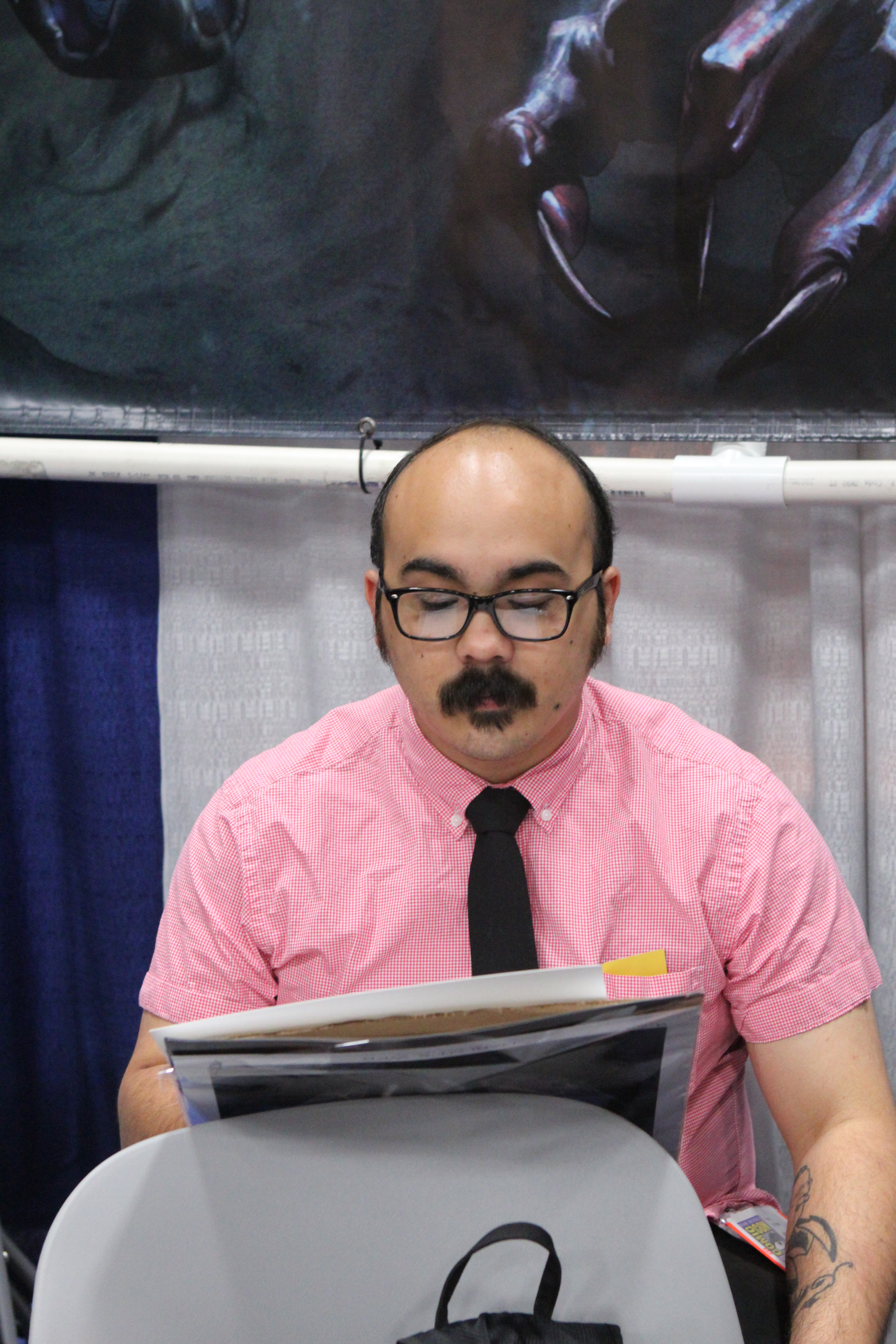
- Anka at 2013 Comic-Con International
- Notable works: Captain Marvel; Runaways; X-Men

Kris Anka is an American comics artist and inker, best known for his work with Marvel Comics on X-Men, Runaways, Captain Marvel, and his 2014 re-design of Spider-Woman. In 2016, Anka illustrated the new Star-Lord ongoing series, which was written by Chip Zdarsky. He also served as lead character designer on Spider-Man: Across the Spider-Verse.

== Bibliography ==
=== Marvel Comics ===
- A+X #10 (2013)
- All-New X-Men Special #1
- All-New Ghost Rider #12 (with Felipe Smith) (2014)
- Captain Marvel Vol 9, #1-10 (2016)
- Secret Wars: Secret Love, "Win A Date with Thor" (2015)
- Spider-Verse #2 (2015)
- Uncanny X-Men #11, 15, 23, 24, 26, 28, 33, 34, 600 (2013-2015)
- Wolverine Vol 6, #8-9 (2014)
- Wolverines #7 (2015)
- X-Men Vol 4, #10-12 (2013)
- X-Men: Battle of the Atom #10 (2013)
- Star-Lord #1-6 (2016-2017)
- The Punisher #13 (2017)
- Runaways #1-12, 15-18 (2017-2019)
- Black Cat #9-10 (2020)

=== DC Comics ===
- Young Justice #5 (2019)

=== Covers ===
- Age of Apocalypse #7-12 (2012)
- All-New X-Factor #1-20 (2014)
- Amazing X-Men Vol 2, #7, 14-16 (2014)
- Beauties #1 (2016)
- Deadpool Vol 3, #13-14 (2013)
- Fresh Romance #7 (2015)
- Glory #27, 30 (2012)
- Gwenpool Special #1 (2016)
- House of M Vol 2, #1-4 (2015)
- The Hypernaturals #2-3, 7–9, 11 (2012)
- Ms. Marvel #10-12, 15-19 (2014)
- New Mutants #37-41 (2009)
- True Believers: The Groovy Deadpool #1 (2016)
- Uncanny Avengers #5 (2015)
- Uncanny X-Force #1-5, 7-14 (2013)
- X-Factor #249 (2013)
- Wolverine and the X-Men, variant #37 (2013)
