= Avengers Undercover =

Marvel comic book series

- Cover for Avengers Undercover #1 (March 2014). Art by Francesco Mattina.

Publication information
- Publisher: Marvel Comics
- Schedule: Monthly
- Format: Ongoing series
- Genre: Superhero
- Publication date: May – November 2014
- No. of issues: 10

Creative team
- Created by: Dennis Hopeless; Kev Walker
- Written by: Dennis Hopeless
- Artist: Kev Walker

Collected editions
- Volume 1: Descent: ISBN 978-0785189404
- Volume 2: Going Native: ISBN 978-0785189411

Avengers Undercover is a comic book series published by Marvel Comics that debuted in March 2014 as part of wave three of the Marvel NOW! relaunch. It serves as a sequel to Avengers Arena, and concluded with September's issue #10.

== Publication history ==
The series follows the survivors of Avengers Arena (minus X-23, Reptil and Darkhawk) - Nico, Chase, Hazmat, Cammi, Death Locket, Cullen Bloodstone, and Anachronism - as they try to infiltrate the Masters of Evil. Hopeless said, "The characters who survived Murderworld came out the other side much different than they went in. Those psychological scars from the "Arena" weigh heavily on all of the kids. They don't fit so well into their old lives. They no longer feel like they belong and they're all looking for a way to get back what they've lost. All of this leads them down the path of Avengers Undercover."

== Plot ==
It has been three months since the events in Arcade's latest Murderworld. Hazmat has quit the Avengers Academy and is in hiding, coping with PTSD from her time in Murderworld. Chase Stein and Nico Minoru have become bitter enemies as Nico has left the Runaways while condemning Chase for going before the media, who have become obsessed with the events of Avengers Arena following Arcade leaking the footage of the carnage online. Death Locket is once again being held prisoner by S.H.I.E.L.D., but she escapes thanks to a sympathetic agent who helps her cope with her ever-evolving cybernetic implants. Cammi is back in Alaska, having discovered her mother had survived a previous attempt on her life by Cammi's enemies, and is struggling with her own PTSD by attending Alcoholics Anonymous meetings with her mother. Cammi reunites with Hazmat, Chase, Nico, and Death Locket after Anachronism summons them to England. Cullen Bloodstone had dropped out of the Braddock Academy and become obsessed with killing Arcade, ultimately tracking him to Bagalia. Anachronism reveals that Cullen has formed an alliance with the Masters of Evil who control the country. Helmut Zemo is leading the Masters of Evil following Max Fury's death and is assisted by Madame Masque (Zemo's right-hand woman) and Constrictor (Zemo's bodyguard). Zemo has also accepted Daimon Hellstrom into his inner circle of the Masters of Evil.

The heroes teleport to Bagalia in disguise and locate Cullen at the Hole, a Bagalian bar owned by Arcade. After a fight with the villains there, Cullen reveals that he has been accepted into the Masters of Evil. Constrictor and Madame Masque arrange for Cullen to teleport the group to a nearby party at Massacrer Casino hosted by Arcade so that they can get revenge on him once and for all.

Zemo, Madame Masque, Constrictor and Daimon Hellstrom watch as the heroes try to avoid being killed as Arcade has arranged the party at Massacrer Casino as the testing grounds for his newest version of "Murderworld": fancy parties at Casino where the rich and powerful can try and kill each other to prove their supremacy. Hazmat turns catatonic as the heroes disable Arcade's power supply as Arcade opines, while attacking the heroes, that the events of Avengers Arena will be his masterpiece that he can never top. After mocking the heroes for being unable to kill him, Hazmat wakes up and incinerates Arcade. Zemo, Masque, Constructor, and Hellstrom begin plotting their next move regarding the heroes.

Back at Massacrer Casino, Cammi realizes Death Locket never took out the cameras. They try to flee while evading the other guest, but S.H.I.E.L.D. has already arrived in S.H.I.E.L.D. Helicarrier Circe. Thanks to their necromancers jamming Nico's spells, the group is taken down by the S.H.I.E.L.D. agents and imprisoned quickly. At the S.H.I.E.L.D. detention center, Karolina Dean, Molly Hayes, Finesse, Striker, Elsa Bloodstone, and several unnamed parents come to visit the group. After Cammi has a touching moment with her mother, Daimon Hellstrom teleports the lair back to Bagalia, where Zemo offers the group a chance to join the Masters of Evil.

Zemo instructs Constrictor, Daimon Hellstrom, and Madame Masque to take a portion of the Murderworld survivors and take them into Bagalia City. Hellstrom takes Nico Minoru and Cullen Bloodstone into Hell Town, a four block district that contains all of the Masters of Evil's magic. When in Hell Town, Hellstrom takes them to Hellstrom Manor, where Bloodstone shows Nico the Demon Cage that Hellstrom created for him. Inside he can learn to control and use his Glartrox form without fear of it getting out of control. Hellstrom states "But if you wanna know why that kid up there roasting in hellfire seems happy while you're clearly inside out miserable, that's simple. Cullen stopped pretending he's not a monster." It was also shown that Hellstrom has resurrected Alex Wilder. Constrictor takes Chase Stein and Death Locket and shows them the freedom of the supervillain lifestyle. While Chase, a natural athlete, plays basketball with the muscle of the Masters, Death Locket is getting the lowdown on how this portion of the group works. Masque leads Anachronism, Cammi, and Hazmat to the rooftop of an unknown building, where they have a short conversation. When Masque leaves, Anachronism, Cammi, and Hazmat discuss their options. If they leave, they go to jail for killing Arcade. If they stay, they become villains. Hazmat thinks they could become super heroes again if they take the Masters down from the inside. Back in Hell Town, Nico Minoru blows some steam by fighting demons in Mephisticuffs and totally loses it in a big way. She comes to herself having basically split a demon down the middle. She leaves in typical angsty fashion and Hellstrom comes to talk to her. He offers a shoulder to cry on and she says he is a little to "smoldering and pentagrammy." His offer wasn't for him, but for someone from her past. The group (except for Death Locket and Bloodstone) comes together and mostly agrees to join with the purpose of secretly bringing the Masters of Evil down. The only exception is Cammi. When Zemo hears that she is the only one not joining, he says that they will respect her choice. Cammi flies away, only to be ambushed by Constrictor.

Chase Stein and Death Locket are training with Excavator until Constrictor assembles the Young Masters for a mission. Constrictor sends Chase Stein, Death Locket, and the Young Masters to A.I.M. Island. During the fight which is a ground skirmish against A.I.M., it is revealed that Death Locket has developed a crush on Excavator and parachutes in to the island. Immediately, she is overwhelmed by A.I.M. troopers and then starts shooting and swinging. Before the Young Masters can achieve their objective, a missile robs them of their entryway upon the arrival of Captain America. When Death Locket tries to take a shot from afar, Chase Stein tries to talk some sense into her while having her "choose who she is fighting for." Excavator returns and gets into a scuffle with Chase. Death Locket tries to get them to stop and finally opens up with her arm canon and drops Chase in a single shot. It is also shown that Alex Wilder has been training with Nico on strengthening her powers and after the trauma of seeing Chase hurt she also starts a romantic relationship with Alex again. Cammi is then in a prison cell with Arcade, who is revealed to have survived, with Hazmat having killed a body double.

Later on, Hazmat and Aiden finally start a relationship and Madame Masque is so enamored that she involves the young couple in her plans. Hazmat passes this information to Hank Pym and the Avengers, but it turns out Zemo was spreading misinformation and setting a trap for the Avengers.

It also turns out that Death Locket had no plans of returning to the surface since she likes Bagalia and is romantically involved with Excavator. Alex Wilder also confesses to Nico that he was aware of the betrayal, but he had to help Zemo in order to leave Hell. Cullen also seems to have betrayed the team, but it turns out Hellstrom is controlling him. Nico is able to break the control spell, but Cullen in his Glartrox form is still uncontrollable. Anachronism talks down Cullen, who returns himself to normal.

Zemo is still able to trap the Avengers in Bagalia while he steals a S.H.I.E.L.D. Helicarrier. Zemo uses S.H.I.E.L.D. communication technology to broadcast that S.H.I.E.L.D. is spying on everybody, but Cammi is able to break out her prison cell and exposes Zemo's manipulations. Cammi destroys their satellite and then flies back into outer space. Zemo escapes with new recruits Alex Wilder and Death Locket, with Arcade being strapped to the front of their Helicarrier. S.H.I.E.L.D. drops the charges since Arcade was never murdered and the team is last seen enjoying a vacation at a lake.

== Characters ==
Character	Real Name	Notes
Anachronism	Aiden	Formerly of Braddock Academy.
Bloodstone	Cullen Bloodstone	Formerly of Braddock Academy.
Cammi	Camille Benally	Formerly of The United Front.
Chase	Chase Stein	Formerly of the Runaways.
Death Locket	Rebecca Ryker	
Hazmat	Jennifer Takeda	Formerly of Avengers Academy.
Nico	Nico Minoru	Formerly of the Runaways.

== Collected editions ==
Title	Material collected	Publication Date	ISBN
Avengers Undercover Vol.1: Descent	Avengers Undercover #1-5	September 2014	978-0785189404
Avengers Undercover Vol.2: Going Native	Avengers Undercover #6-10	November 2014	978-0785189411
Avengers Undercover The Complete Collection	Avengers Undercover #1-10	November 2018	978-1302913939
