= Runaways (comics) =

Marvel comic book series

- Runaways Vol. 1 hardcover, art by Adrian Alphona

Group publication information
- Publisher: Marvel Comics
- First appearance: Runaways #1 (July 2003)
- Created by: Brian K. Vaughan (writer); Adrian Alphona (artist)

In-story information
- Base(s): Malibu; formerly a lair beneath the La Brea Tar Pits
- Leader(s): Nico Minoru; Alex Wilder (formerly)
- Agent(s): Current members: Karolina Dean; Molly Hayes; Old Lace; Nico Minoru; Chase Stein; Gertrude Yorkes; Victor Mancha; Rufus; Gib; Doombot; Former members: Topher; Alex Wilder; Zeke Zheng; Allis Abernathy; Xavin; Klara Prast; Leapfrog

Runaways

Series publication information
- Schedule: monthly
- Format: Ongoing series
- Genre: Superhero
- Publication date: (Volume 1); April 2003 – August 2004 (Volume 2); February 2005 – June 2008 (Volume 3); August 2008 – November 2009 (Volume 4); May 2015 – November 2015 (Volume 5); September 2017 – August 2021
- Number of issues: (Volume 1): 18 (Volume 2): 30 (Volume 3): 14 (Volume 4): 4 (Volume 5): 38
- Creator(s): Brian K. Vaughan (writer); Adrian Alphona (artist)

Runaways is a superhero comic book series published by Marvel Comics. The series features a group of teenagers who discover that their parents are part of an evil crime organization known as "the Pride". Created by Brian Vaughan and Adrian Alphona, the series debuted in July 2003 as part of Marvel Comics' "Tsunami" imprint. The series was canceled in September 2004 at issue #18, but due to high numbers of trade collection sales, Marvel revived the series in February 2005.

Originally, the series featured a group of six kids whose parents routinely met every year for a charity event. One year, the kids spy on their parents and learn they are "the Pride", a criminal group of mob bosses, time-travelers, wizards, evil scientists, alien invaders and telepathic mutants. The kids steal weapons and resources from their parents and learn that they themselves inherited their parents' powers; Alex Wilder, a prodigy, leads the team while Nico Minoru learns she is a powerful witch, Karolina Dean discovers she is an alien, Gertrude Yorkes learns of her telepathic link to a dinosaur, Chase Stein steals his father's fistigons (fire gauntlets) and x-ray goggles, and young Molly Hayes learns she is a mutant with incredible strength. The kids band together and defeat their parents and atone for the sins of their parents by fighting the new threats trying to fill in the Pride's void. Later, they are joined by the cyborg Victor Mancha, the shape-shifting Skrull Xavin, and the plant-manipulator Klara Prast.

Since the original group's introduction, the Runaways have been portrayed as a somewhat dysfunctional yet loving family. Series creators Brian K. Vaughan and Adrian Alphona left the series at issue 24 of the title's second volume, which ended at issue #30. The series was cancelled in November 2009 after issue #14 of Volume 3, but the characters have been seen in other comics. On September 1, 2017, Rainbow Rowell and Kris Anka revived the series, which ran for 38 issues.

A live-action adaptation of the series was in development for several years, leading to the Runaways television series set in the Marvel Cinematic Universe. It debuted on Hulu in 2017.

== Publication history ==
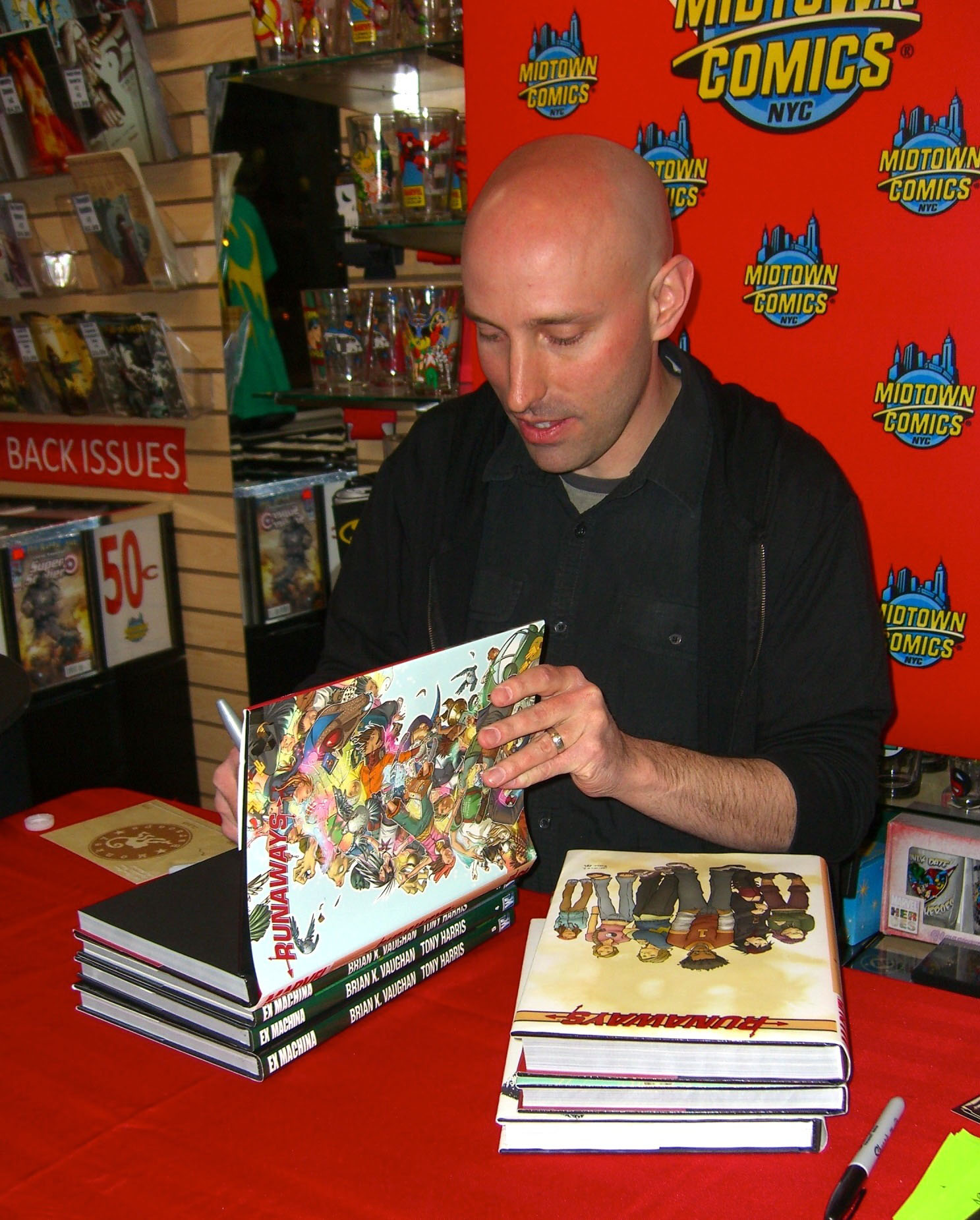
Writer Brian K. Vaughan signing hardcover copies of the series at Midtown Comics in Manhattan.

Series creator Brian K. Vaughan pitched Runaways in 2003 as a part of Marvel's Tsunami imprint, the goal of which was to attract new readers, particularly young readers and the manga audience. Marvel editorial staff agreed to it immediately, prompting Wizard Magazine to name the series as "one of the best original concepts from Marvel in thirty years." The Tsunami imprint turned out to be unsuccessful, and the series ended at issue #18. After the series' sales in digests, Vaughan pitched the idea again to Marvel, who accepted it.

Writer Brian K. Vaughan has claimed that he had only planned to write Runaways for six months/issues, but because of the popularity of the series and new ideas from Vaughan, Marvel decided to continue issuing it on a monthly basis. In 2007, Brian K. Vaughan announced his departure from Runaways, deciding to leave the series at the top of its game. Longtime Runaways-fan Joss Whedon was hand-picked by Vaughan to write an arc and finish the second volume; although Whedon had declined at first, he later accepted.

In 2008, writer Terry Moore, alongside artist Humberto Ramos became the new creative team for the third volume. In Blair Butler's "Fresh Ink" segment on the cable television station G4 show Attack of the Show Marvel revealed that Kathryn Immonen and Sarah Pichelli were the new creative team. They began with issue #11 of Volume 3, which will "start with a prom and end with a death"; Marvel editor Nick Lowe said that "It feels so right and so wrong at the same time? To be honest, and no offense to Joss or Terry, I hadn't felt this way since Gert died." The story ended with a major cliffhanger that was resolved in other comics.

After three years, the Runaways returned in the story arc "Pride Comes Before It", in issues 17 to 19 of Daken: Dark Wolverine. They appeared in Avengers Academy #27–28. Since then, Victor Mancha became a regular character in the robot-themed comic Avengers A.I., while Nico Minoru and Chase Stein became part of the cast in Avengers Arena, and its sequel Avengers Undercover.

In February 2015, it was announced that a new Runaways series would be launching during Marvel's Secret Wars crossover written by ND Stevenson and drawn by Sanford Greene, featuring a new cast set on Battleworld. The lineup of the new team included Molly Hayes and a team of all new members. Additionally, Nico Minoru was featured in A-Force. Nico was also used on a second run of A-Force, this time based in the mainstream Marvel Universe, but was cancelled after ten issues.

In May 2017, Marvel released teasers with the characters of the Runaways. In June 2017, it was announced that Marvel would release a new Runaways series written by Rainbow Rowell, and illustrated by Kris Anka. The new series was released in September 2017. In August 2021, Marvel celebrated the title's 100 issues with co-creator Adrian Alphona returning for a special giant-sized Runaways #38, final issue of Rowell's run. In 2023, a six-issue arc resolving one of the cliffhangers from that issue written by Terry Blas and drawn by Bruno Olivera was published as part of the Marvel's Voices Infinity Comic series on the Marvel Unlimited app.

== Fictional team biography ==
When Alex, Chase, Gert, Karolina, Molly, and Nico witness their parents ("The Pride") sacrifice a girl in an occult ceremony, the group runs off. As the story progresses, the children learn of their heritage and abilities, and steal resources from their parents, including futuristic gauntlets, a dinosaur, and a mystical Staff. Using these resources, they manage to remove their parents, who were aided by their benefactors, the Gibborim, from their criminal hold of Los Angeles. Alex, concealing his true loyalty to his parents, betrays the other Runaways to the Pride; in the final battle with the Pride, Alex is incinerated by the Gibborim.

With the Pride defeated, Nico becomes the de facto leader, and the other Runaways now vow to prevent other villains from filling in the void left by their parents. When an older version of Gert time travels to the present, she begs the Runaways to find a boy named Victor Mancha and stop him before he grows up to become a villain in her time named "Victorious". He betrayed her and then murdered every hero on the planet. It is at this point she dies, but the Runaways decide to comply with her wish. The Runaways track down Victor and discover that his actual "father" is Ultron who created Victor as a sleeper agent for the Avengers. The Runaways foiled this plan, but Victor still fears this future may come true. They take Victor in after realizing that he is in the same boat as they are. A shape-shifting alien Skrull Xavin arrives on earth and demands Karolina to leave with them. After a brief confrontation with the Runaways, they explain that Karolina is their fiancée as arranged by their parents and they must go to stop the fifteen-year war between their races. During the wedding ceremony, a fight breaks out between the two races and they barely escape before Majesdane is destroyed. They return to Earth, where they join the team and help rescue Molly along with the rest of the Runaways from the New Pride. Right before the Runaways defeat a new incarnation of the Pride and Alex's resurrected father, Gertrude is fatally wounded. Before she passes, she transfers her power to control Old Lace to Chase.

In the Civil War crossover event, the Young Avengers travel to Los Angeles to help the Runaways fight off the government agents and Flag-Smasher. The two teams encounter Noh-Varr, who works for S.H.I.E.L.D. and attempts to capture the teenagers. Chase then hatches a plan, without the consent of the rest of the team, to sacrifice himself to the Gibborim, but the team comes to save him, which then causes the Gibborim to be obliterated. When the Runaways are accidentally time-displaced in 1907, they encounter the deceased Runaway Gertrude Yorke's parents. After defeating the Yorkes and deadly gang war, plant-manipulator Klara Prast joins the Runaways when they return to the present. Upon returning from 1907, the Runaways find themselves in New York helping the Young Avengers during the Secret Invasion, where the Skrull Armada has invaded seeking Hulkling. Xavin pretended to be loyal to the Skrulls to protect her friends during an attack, but helps them retreat away from the battle.

The Runaways are hunted by several remaining Majesdanian soldiers with the desire to capture Karolina for the problems caused on their planet; in a twisted turn of events, however, Xavin shape-shifts into Karolina and leaves with the Majesdanians. The Runaways also prevent a zombie epidemic in Los Angeles. Molly also visits the X-Men in San Francisco and reconciles with Wolverine. The team is attacked while staying in Chase's parent's beach house. Old Lace is critically wounded saving Klara, whose powers cause foliage to keep the house from crumbling, but trapping everybody. A man alleging to be Chase's uncle appears and tries to help, but is followed by the military. The team runs away, but Chase separates and is critically wounded in a car accident while running across the street chasing a figure reminiscent to Gertrude.

The reunited Runaways later formed an uneasy alliance with Daken in order to take down Marcus Roston, a superpowered criminal with ties to the Pride. Then they appeared again at the Avengers Academy asking for help in finding Old Lace, who has been banished into a secret dimension.

The Runaways partially disbanded afterwards, with Victor joining Hank Pym's Avengers A.I. team while Nico and Chase were both captured by Arcade and forced to fight for their lives in Avengers Arena, later joining other teen superheroes who survived Arcade's games in Avengers Undercover. After Nico's brutal death, dismemberment, and subsequent resurrection in Avengers Arena, she is traumatized and has a hard time assimilating back with the Runaways. Chase seemed fine by his experiences in MurderWorld and relished his newfound fame. Chase returned to take care of Karolina, Molly, and Klara. By the end of Avengers Undercover, however, the Runaways seem to be together once again. Some time after the events of Avengers Undercover, Nico joins the A-Force before returning to Los Angeles. After Victor's time with the Avengers A.I., he is recruited to work with Vision and moves in with him and his family in DC in The Vision (2015).

Some time later, Chase used the Yorkes time machine to go back in time and save Gert before she was killed by Geoffrey Wilder. The plan partially works but Gert is still gravely injured. Nico managed to heal her and they went in search of the past members of the team in the hopes of reforming. Karolina had become a college student, living off her parents' royalties and in a relationship with Lightspeed from Power Pack, and Molly went to live with her grandmother and study middle school. Both turned down the offer to rejoin the team, but Gert accepted, becoming Molly's adopted sister living under her grandmother's rule. The pieces of Victor Mancha had been sent by the Avengers to Chase, and he managed to reactive him thereby triggering the "Victorious" program but not completely rebuild him. After rescuing Molly and Gert from her mad scientist grandmother's house, the team reformed and began to live on a derelict underground Pride Hostel, with Nico and Chase magically becoming Molly's legal guardians. Romance blossomed between Nico and Karolina and between Gert and Victor.

Alex Wilder, reappeared to warn Runaways of an impending danger in the form of Seed of the Gibborim, a trio of gods and descendants of the Gibborim that their parents tried to summon with a ritual. They tried to get the team to continue their families' ritual, leaving one of the trio – Gib – to watch over them. On the day the ritual was supposed to take place, Gib betrayed the Seed. The two remaining gods were sent into the future to stop their threat. Gib joined the team while Alex was cast out as his former teammates did not trust him.

They were recruited to join a resurrected J-Team, given costumes and support to become official heroes. However, Gert later discovered that Doc Justice, the man who helped them, was simply trying to keep a brand going and had plans to sacrifice Karolina in order to boost his ratings, as he had done many times before. The team fought Doc Justice and, having defeated him, was about to walk away but Old Lace killed Doc and offered his soul to Gib.

=== Style ===
The series does not use concepts of regular superhero behavior, such as aliases, uniforms, and team names. All the characters in Volume 1, except Alex Wilder, adopt codenames, but they stop using their codenames by the end of Volume 1. Unlike many other super hero teams, the Runaways have more females than males. At one point, there was only one male on the team with four females, prompting other groups to refer to him as "the girls' getaway man". At another point, the team has two males, four females and one gender shifter (and a female dinosaur).

Early in the series, Molly is the only character who makes a costume, but she creates it from old bed sheets and clothes, not the traditional uniform of superhero costumes; she never wears the costume again. During battle, the Runaways mainly fight in their street clothes and call each other by their given names. Furthermore, the children almost never refer to themselves as "the Runaways" as the series' title might suggest; their team simply goes unnamed, except for one brief instance, when Nico calls them "the Runaways", and tells them to "run away". Other Marvel characters in the Marvel Universe usually refer to the nameless team as "the Pride's kids" or "those kids in L.A." Vaughan even mocks the notion of superhero catchphrases such as "Hulk smash!", "It's Clobberin' Time", or "Avengers assemble!". During a battle with Swarm, Nico semi-sarcastically tells Victor the team's rallying call is "Try not to die". However, despite Vaughan's efforts to break down the superhero clichés within Runaways, Marvel's handbooks and website still refer to the characters by their codenames. The Marvel miniseries Mystic Arcana, published late in 2007, features Nico Minoru under her superhero alias "Sister Grimm", a name she has not answered to since Runaways volume two began; the character one-shot's story takes place between 17 and 18 of Runaways Volume 1 but she is not referred to by the code-name in it.

=== Spin-off ===
Excelsior was a support group consisting of former teenage superheroes from defunct Marvel comic series (though one of their members – Lightspeed – was and remains a cast member of a financially and critically successful series of Power Pack books aimed at younger readers). Excelsior was founded by Mickey Musashi (Turbo of the New Warriors) and Phil Urich (the heroic former Green Goblin), and the group's stated goals were to help fellow/former teenage superheroes to adjust to normal lives and dissuade other super-powered teenagers from becoming heroes. Though they originally debuted under the name "Excelsior", the title of the spin-off series was changed from Excelsior to Loners, due to copyright issues, as Stan Lee held a trademark on the term "Excelsior!"

== Characters ==
- **Bold** indicates current member

=== Founding members ===
Character	Alias	Joined in	Notes
Alex Wilder		Runaways #1 (July 2003)	The son of mafia bosses, he was a child prodigy at strategic thinking and planning. Later betrayed the team in Runaways #16, and died the following issue. Re-appears in Runaways Volume 5 #12 as a living corpse.
Nico Minoru	**The Gloom**; formerly Sister Grimm	Runaways #1 (July 2003)	The daughter of dark wizards, she is a witch capable of manipulating magic. She becomes the group's leader, following Alex's departure.
Karolina Dean	**Princess Justice**; formerly Lucy in the Sky	Runaways #1 (July 2003)	The daughter of alien invaders, she is a solar-powered alien known as a Majesdanian.
Molly Hayes	**Blue-J**; formerly Bruiser, Princess Powerful	Runaways #1 (July 2003)	The daughter of telepathic mutants, she is a mutant whose powers include super-strength and invulnerability.
Chase Stein	**Gun Arm**; formerly Talkback, Neo, Darkhawk, Chasehawk	Runaways #1 (July 2003)	The son of mad scientists, he steals his father's flame generating/manipulating gauntlets called "the Fistigons".
Gertrude Yorkes	Formerly Arsenic	Runaways #1 (July 2003)	The daughter of time-traveling criminals, she used to have an empathic and telepathic link with Old Lace. Dies in Runaways Volume 2 #18, but rejoined after her resurrection in Runaways Volume 5 #1.

=== Later recruits ===
Character	Alias	Joined in	Notes
**Old Lace**		Runaways #2 (July 2003)	A genetically engineered dinosaur from the 87th century; had a telepathic and empathic bond with Gert and later Chase.
Topher		Runaways #7 (December 2003)	A hundred-year-old vampire who joined the Runaways under the pretense of having been forced into a life of crime by his parents. He planned on turning the Runaways into his undead-vampire familiars. Died in Runaways #10 when he drank Karolina's blood and the solar energy in her blood incinerated him.
Leapfrog		Runaways #18 (November 2004)	A sentient frog-shaped vehicle with an advanced artificial intelligence designed by Chase's parents, it is the group's personal transport equipped with lasers and a cloaking device.
**Victor Mancha**	**Kid Justice**, formerly Victorious	Runaways Volume 2 #6 (September 2005)	The creation of the Avengers' foe Ultron and Marianella Mancha, he is a cyborg who can manipulate electricity and metal. Victor left the team to join Avengers A.I. and died in Vision (2016) #11; having since been reactivated as 'just' his head.
Xavin		Runaways Volume 2 #17 (August 2006)	The child of Skrull warlords, Xavin can shape-shift and also manifest the powers of the Fantastic Four. Xavin leaves the team in Runaways Volume 3 #6.
Klara Prast	Formerly Rose Red, Tower of Flower	Runaways Volume 2 #30 (August 2008)	A Swiss immigrant to America from 1907 and child bride of an abusive older man, she can control the growth of plants. Currently adopted by a homosexual couple after the team disbanded.
Zeke Zheng		Runaways An Original Novel (January 2018)	A teenager with the ability to switch his body with one of the Kurdogrim (a race of elder gods similar to the Gibborim). Zeke infiltrated and manipulated the Runaways to gain their aid in defeating the Nightwatch to allow the Kurdogrim to enslave humanity. He was defeated by the Runaways and captured by the Nightwatch.
Allis Abernathy		Runaways An Original Novel (January 2018)	A telepathic teenager with the ability to influence the thoughts and actions of others. She infiltrated the Runaways after a faux-rescue and became a romantic interest for Karolina. She used her abilities to convince the Runaways to accept both herself and Zeke. She was defeated by the Runaways and captured by the Nightwatch.
**Rufus**		Runaways Volume 5 #6 (April 2018)	One of a number of stray cats artificially given telepathic mutant powers by Molly's Grandmother for use as spies. Rufus joined the Runaways following Dr. Hayes' defeat.
**Gib**	**Old God**	Runaways Volume 5 #18 (April 2019)	Former member of the Seed of the Gibborim, Gib is a six-fingered giant with immense strength. Remained with the Runaways after his nestmates, Bo and Rim, were sent 999 years into the future by Gert.
**Doombot**		Runaways Volume 5 #32 (December 2020)	A Doombot reprogrammed by Hank Pym who became Victor's former Avengers teammate and friend. Doombot visited the Runaways to offer to build a new body for Victor's severed head, eventually moving in with the team following the betrayal of Doc Justice.

== Other versions ==
=== Heroine ===
At one point, Gertrude's future self travels back in time. She is in her thirties, appearing under the name Heroine, and is without Old Lace. Nico reveals, with the aid of magic, that this version of Gertrude is the leader of the Avengers of her timeline. Superheroes in her time include characters yet to make an official appearance in the regular Marvel Universe, including an "Iron Woman", a heroic Scorpion, the "Fantastic Fourteen", and "Captain Americas". She, the rest of her team, the X-Men (led by Armor), and the Fantastic Fourteen are killed by Victor Mancha's future self, who completed his original mission programmed by Ultron to become the ultimate supervillain "Victorious".

=== House of M ===
In the House of M reality warp, the Pride is mentioned as ruling not only Los Angeles, but all of Southern California. Unlike in the normal reality, their children stay with their parents. Karolina is mentioned as being a "go-to" girl for the Wolfpack. When the Scarlet Witch takes the majority of the mutants populations' powers, Molly is one of the handful that keeps her powers.

In an interview with Comic Book Resources, Brian K. Vaughan revealed that Runaways (despite being in the main Marvel Universe) will not refer to the House of M reality warp. Vaughan's reason for not wanting Runaways to refer to the Scarlet Witch's attack was because he did not want the readers of Runaways to be confused about the complex House of M storyline. He did, however say there would be a brief one-line reference, which happened in the following issue: after Molly angrily punches Wolverine out of a church, he lands in the snow and bitterly says, "Only 198 mutants left on the planet... and that girl had to be one of them." The events of House of M and "Decimation" are referred to later in an issue written by Chris Yost with Wolverine encountering Molly again and stating, "I don't know if you're keeping up with the current events, but there used to be millions of mutants and now there's under 200."

=== Marvel Zombies ===
In Marvel Zombies/Army of Darkness #2, the Blob is chased by various zombie super heroes. Behind him, in the background, zombie versions of the Runaways are shown feeding upon Old Lace.

=== Wha... Huh? ===
Goofy versions of the original team, including Alex Wilder, are seen in the Wha... Huh? one shot as part of a joke about Wolverine appearing in every comic including Archie, Yu-Gi-Oh!, and Pokémon.

=== What If...? ===
In December 2008, all five issues of What If...? featured the Runaways becoming the Young Avengers as back-up stories. The five-part backup feature (entitled What If Runaways became Young Avengers?) illustrates how Iron Lad recruits the Runaways as the next new wave of the Avengers, forcing them to be an actual superhero team with costumes. However, it is later revealed that the Iron Lad that brought them together was actually Victor Mancha; Iron Lad ran into Victor's future self when attempting to flee to the Avengers' era, with Victorious travelling back with him and using Victor to hijack his equipment. Kang's subsequent attempt to rescue his younger self results in Iron Lad being killed. With Kang subsequently erased from history, Victor destroys his future self and departs via Kang's time-belt to find his own way, leaving the Runaways to continue as Young Avengers, with Chase now using parts of the Iron Lad armor after he was injured in a fight with Victorious. Written by C.B. Cebulski and drawn by Patrick "Spaz" Spaziante, the story had originally been called What If the Runaways didn't run away? But it was not until Cebulski accidentally stumbled onto the Young Avengers storyline that he decide to merge the two stories. Joe Quesada, editor in chief of Marvel Comics revealed early in his online interview feature, "MyCup o' Joe", that the main villain in the What if? storyline is Victorious, though Kang the Conqueror makes an appearance. A reviewer, Jesse Schedeen of IGN cited What If...? itself as "a let down", although the Runaways back-up story was positively received.

=== Ultimate Marvel ===
In the Ultimate Marvel universe, a version of the Runaways exist, but as an all-mutant covert team under S.H.I.E.L.D. director General Nick Fury called Ultimate X. After the events of Ultimatum, Nick Fury contacted former X-Men Jean Grey aka Karen Grant with a purpose to unite fellow mutants to combat threats mostly a conflict in Southeast Asian Republic/SEAR with two cities of superhumans. Members include Jimmy Hudson, son of the late Wolverine, Elizabeth "Liz" Allan aka Firestar, a former classmate of Spider-Man who discovered she was a pyrokinetic mutant, and Derek Morgan aka The Guardian, a vigilante in Chicago who can sprout wings, talons and glowing red eyes. The team was officially named The Runaways in Ultimate Comics: Ultimates.

=== Battle of the Atom ===
An alternate future version of an adult Molly Hayes appeared in the X-Men crossover event Battle of the Atom. Initially arriving under the guise of a team of future X-Men, Molly and her companions were later revealed to be members of a new Brotherhood of Mutants led by Raze, the shape-shifting son of Wolverine and Mystique. Molly appears in the comic as a tall, muscular woman with an armored arm and no longer seems to be affected by the fatigue she formerly experienced after using her powers. Following the Brotherhood's defeat, Molly hid with her team. In a subsequent encounter it is revealed that Molly was under mind control, she and her companions are freed and return to their future. The other Runaways are mentioned in the event, but do not appear.

=== Secret Wars ===
An alternate version of the Runaways star in the comic's fourth volume, taking place during Secret Wars under the Battleworld banner. The mini series was created by ND Stevenson and Sanford Greene. In the series, a different group of children, who are students at the Victor von Doom Institute for Gifted Youths in Doomstadt, discover that the school's annual "final exams" are actually fatal. They escape but are chased down by senior student Bucky Barnes, under orders from school headmaster Valeria Von Doom.

Nico Minoru appears part of the A-Force under the War Zones banner.

==== Members ====
The new team includes alternate versions of Marvel heroes such as:

- Amadeus Cho of the Warzone, supposedly the brains of the group, as he can rig into computers and Doombots. He slightly admires Delphyne Gorgon.
- Cloak and Dagger of Arachnia, Tyrone is Dagger and Tandy is Cloak. The pair are siblings.
- Delphyne Gorgon of Arcadia, another member of the Night Witches. She loses an arm during the story.
- Frostbite (Sanna Strand) of Killville, a tough female who always sticks to the rules. She strongly dislikes Jubilee.
- Jubilee of Limbo, a member of a gang-type group called the Night Witches. However, it is not confirmed whether she is a vampire or not.
- Molly Hayes of the Kingdom of Manhattan, the only original Runaways character to appear.
- Pixie (Megan Gwynn) of Mutopia, the third member of Night Witches. Currently deceased.
- Skaar of Greenland, the Hulk of the group and Cho's bodyguard.

== Bibliography ==
In addition to the three volumes of The Runaways, the group has appeared in two miniseries related to the intracompany crossovers "Civil War" (2006), which occurs between issues 21 & 22 of volume 2, and "Secret Invasion" (2008) which occurs between volumes 2 & 3.

=== Collected editions ===
#	Title	Issues collected	Legacy	Writers	Artists	Format	Pages	Released	ISBN
Digests, trade paperbacks & premier hardcovers
1	Pride & Joy	Runaways #1–6	#1-6	Brian K. Vaughan	Adrian Alphona	Digest	144	Apr 14, 2004	978-0785113799
1	Pride & Joy	Runaways #1–6	#1-6	Brian K. Vaughan	Adrian Alphona	TPB	144	Aug 26, 2009	978-0785134701
1	Pride & Joy	Runaways #1–6	#1-6	Brian K. Vaughan	Adrian Alphona	HC	144	Dec 31, 2008	978-0785135586
2	Teenage Wasteland	Runaways #7-12	#7-12	Brian K. Vaughan	Adrian Alphona, Takeshi Miyazawa	Digest	144	Nov 1, 2004	978-0785114154
2	Teenage Wasteland	Runaways #7-12	#7-12	Brian K. Vaughan	Adrian Alphona, Takeshi Miyazawa	TPB	144	Oct 14, 2009	978-0785140757
2	Teenage Wasteland	Runaways #7-12	#7-12	Brian K. Vaughan	Adrian Alphona, Takeshi Miyazawa	HC	144	Jul 8, 2009	978-0785139737
3	The Good Die Young	Runaways #13-18	#13-18	Brian K. Vaughan	Adrian Alphona	Digest	144	Feb 16, 2005	978-0785116844
3	The Good Die Young	Runaways #13-18	#13-18	Brian K. Vaughan	Adrian Alphona	TPB	144	Dec 9, 2009	978-0785136736
3	The Good Die Young	Runaways #13-18	#13-18	Brian K. Vaughan	Adrian Alphona	HC	144	Sep 10, 2009	978-0785136729
4	True Believers	Runaways (vol.2) #1-6	#19-24	Brian K. Vaughan	Adrian Alphona	Digest	144	Oct 12, 2005	978-0785117056
4	True Believers	Runaways (vol.2) #1-6	#19-24	Brian K. Vaughan	Adrian Alphona	TPB	144	Apr 14, 2010	978-0785141457
4	True Believers	Runaways (vol.2) #1-6	#19-24	Brian K. Vaughan	Adrian Alphona	HC	144	Dec 23, 2009	978-0785141440
5	Escape To New York	Runaways (vol.2) #7-12; material from FCBD: X-Men/Runaways (2006)	#25-30	Brian K. Vaughan	Adrian Alphona, Takeshi Miyazawa, Scottie Young	Digest	144	Apr 5, 2006	978-0785119012
5	Escape To New York	Runaways (vol.2) #7-12; material from FCBD: X-Men/Runaways (2006)	#25-30	Brian K. Vaughan	Adrian Alphona, Takeshi Miyazawa, Scottie Young	TPB	144	May 12, 2010	978-0785141471
5	Escape To New York	Runaways (vol.2) #7-12; material from FCBD: X-Men/Runaways (2006)	#25-30	Brian K. Vaughan	Adrian Alphona, Takeshi Miyazawa, Scottie Young	HC	144	Jan 13, 2010	978-0785141464
6	Parental Guidance	Runaways (vol.2) #13-18	#31-36	Brian K. Vaughan	Adrian Alphona	Digest	144	Oct 25, 2006	978-0785119524
6	Parental Guidance	Runaways (vol.2) #13-18	#31-36	Brian K. Vaughan	Adrian Alphona	TPB	144	Jul 14, 2010	978-0785141501
6	Parental Guidance	Runaways (vol.2) #13-18	#31-36	Brian K. Vaughan	Adrian Alphona	HC	144	Mar 10, 2010	978-0785141495
7	Live Fast	Runaways (vol.2) #19-24	#37-42	Brian K. Vaughan	Adrian Alphona, Mike Norton	Digest	144	Apr 25, 2007	978-0785122678
7	Live Fast	Runaways (vol.2) #19-24	#37-42	Brian K. Vaughan	Adrian Alphona, Mike Norton	TPB	144	Sep 9, 2010	978-0785141556
7	Live Fast	Runaways (vol.2) #19-24	#37-42	Brian K. Vaughan	Adrian Alphona, Mike Norton	HC	144	May 26, 2010	978-0785141549
	Civil War: Young Avengers/Runaways	Civil War: Young Avengers/Runaways #1-4; Civil War Files		Zeb Wells	Stefano Caselli	TPB	112	May 2, 2007	978-0785123170
8	Dead End Kids	Runaways (vol.2) #25-30	#43-48	Joss Whedon	Michael Ryan	Digest	152	Jun 10, 2009	978-0785123897
8	Dead End Kids	Runaways (vol.2) #25-30	#43-48	Joss Whedon	Michael Ryan	TPB	152	Dec 31, 2008	978-0785134596
8	Dead End Kids	Runaways (vol.2) #25-30	#43-48	Joss Whedon	Michael Ryan	HC	152	Jul 9, 2008	978-0785128533
	Secret Invasion: Runaways/Young Avengers	Secret Invasion: Runaways/Young Avengers #1-3		Christopher Yost	Takeshi Miyazawa	TPB	96	Feb 25, 2009	978-0785132660
9	Dead Wrong	Runaways (vol.3) #1-6	#49-54	Terry Moore	Humberto Ramos	Digest	136	Oct 21, 2009	978-0785141198
9	Dead Wrong	Runaways (vol.3) #1-6	#49-54	Terry Moore	Humberto Ramos	TPB	136	Jun 10, 2009	978-0785129400
9	Dead Wrong	Runaways (vol.3) #1-6	#49-54	Terry Moore	Humberto Ramos	HC	136	Mar 11, 2009	978-0785129394
10	Rock Zombies	Runaways (vol.3) #7-10	#55-58	Terry Moore, Christopher Yost, James Asmus	Takeshi Miyazawa, Sara Pichelli	Digest	112	Apr 21, 2010	978-0785133155
10	Rock Zombies	Runaways (vol.3) #7-10	#55-58	Terry Moore, Christopher Yost, James Asmus	Takeshi Miyazawa, Sara Pichelli	TPB	112	Oct 21, 2009	978-0785140740
10	Rock Zombies	Runaways (vol.3) #7-10	#55-58	Terry Moore, Christopher Yost, James Asmus	Takeshi Miyazawa, Sara Pichelli	TPB	112	Apr 17, 2018	978-1302909116
10	Rock Zombies	Runaways (vol.3) #7-10	#55-58	Terry Moore, Christopher Yost, James Asmus	Takeshi Miyazawa, Sara Pichelli	HC	112	Jul 1, 2009	978-0785131564
11	Homeschooling	Runaways (vol.3) #11–14; What If The Runaways Became The Young Avengers?	#59-62	Kathryn Immonen, C.B. Cebulski	Sara Pichelli, Patrick Spaziante	Digest	136	Sep 8, 2010	978-0785140856
11	Homeschooling	Runaways (vol.3) #11–14; What If The Runaways Became The Young Avengers?	#59-62	Kathryn Immonen, C.B. Cebulski	Sara Pichelli, Patrick Spaziante	TPB	136	Mar 24, 2010	978-0785140399
11	Homeschooling	Runaways (vol.3) #11–14; What If The Runaways Became The Young Avengers?	#59-62	Kathryn Immonen, C.B. Cebulski	Sara Pichelli, Patrick Spaziante	HC	136	Nov 18, 2009	978-0785140375
	Battleworld: Runaways	Runaways (vol.4) #1-4; Secret Wars: Secret Love		ND Stevenson	Sanford Greene	TPB	120	Dec 9, 2015	978-0785198826
Runaways was rebooted in 2017, with Rainbow Rowell becoming writer
1	Find Your Way Home	Runaways (vol.5) #1-6	#63-68	Rainbow Rowell	Kris Anka	TPB	136	May 1, 2018	978-1302908522
2	Best Friends	Runaways (vol.5) #7-12	#69-74	Rainbow Rowell	Kris Anka	TPB	136	Oct 23, 2018	978-1302911973
3	That Was Yesterday	Runaways (vol.5) #13-18	#75-80	Rainbow Rowell	Kris Anka, David Lafuente	TPB	136	Apr 23, 2019	978-1302914134
4	But You Can't Hide	Runaways (vol.5) #19-24	#81-86	Rainbow Rowell	Andrés Genolet, Niko Henrichon	TPB	144	Oct 29, 2019	978-1302918019
5	Canon Fodder	Runaways (vol.5) #25-31	#87-93	Rainbow Rowell	Andrés Genolet, Kris Anka	TPB	136	May 26, 2020	978-1302920289
6	Come Away With Me	Runaways (vol.5) #32-38	#94-100	Rainbow Rowell	Andrés Genolet, Natacha Bustos, Kris Anka, Adrian Alphona	TPB	168	Oct 5, 2021	978-1302925567
Runaways was rebooted in 2025, with Rainbow Rowell starting a new run
1	Think Of The Children	Runaways (vol.6) #1-5	#101-105	Rainbow Rowell	Elena Casagrande	TPB	120	Feb 10, 2026	978-1302963972
Complete Collections
1	Volume One	Runaways #1-18	#1-18	Brian K. Vaughan	Adrian Alphona, Takeshi Miyazawa	TPB	448	Aug 12, 2014	978-0785185581
2	Volume Two	Runaways (vol.2) #1-18; FCBD: X-Men/Runaways (2006)	#19-36	Brian K. Vaughan	Adrian Alphona, Takeshi Miyazawa, Scottie Young	TPB	472	Dec 2, 2014	978-0785187844
3	Volume Three	Runaways (vol.2) #19-30; Civil War: Young Avengers And Runaways #1–4; Runaways Saga; Secret Invasion: Runaways/Young Avengers #1–3	#37-48	Brian K. Vaughan, Joss Whedon, Zeb Wells, Christopher Yost	Adrian Alphona, Takeshi Miyazawa, Mike Norton, Stefano Caselli, Michael Ryan	TPB	528	Mar 17, 2015	978-0785189176
4	Volume Four	Runaways (vol.3) #1–14; Mystic Arcana: Sister Grimm; Breaking Into Comics The Marvel Way; What If The Runaways Became The Young Avengers	#49-62	Terry Moore, Kathryn Immonen, C.B. Cebulski, Christopher Yost, James Asmus	Humberto Ramos, Takeshi Miyazawa, Sara Pichelli, Philip J. Noto, Emma Ríos	TPB	432	Jul 14, 2015	978-0785189053
Oversized hardcovers
1	Runaways Vol. 1	Runaways #1-18	#1-18	Brian K. Vaughan	Adrian Alphona, Takeshi Miyazawa	OHC	448	Aug 10, 2005	978-0785118763
2	Runaways Vol. 2	Runaways (vol.2) #1-12; FCBD: X-Men/Runaways (2006)	#19-30	Brian K. Vaughan	Adrian Alphona, Takeshi Miyazawa, Scottie Young	OHC	320	Dec 6, 2006	978-0785123583
3	Runaways Vol. 3	Runaways (vol.2) #13-24	#31-42	Brian K. Vaughan	Adrian Alphona, Mike Norton	OHC	296	May 16, 2007	978-0785125396
	Runaways by Brian K. Vaughan & Adrian Alphona	Runaways #1-18; Runaways (vol.2) #1-24; FCBD: X-Men/Runaways (2006)	#1-42	Brian K. Vaughan	Adrian Alphona, Takeshi Miyazawa, Scottie Young	Omnibus	1,072	Jun 19, 2018	978-1302912185
	Runaways by Rainbow Rowell	Runaways (vol.5) #1-38; Runaways (vol.6) #1-5	#63-105	Rainbow Rowell	Kris Anka, David Lafuente, Andres Genolet	Omnibus	1,040	Jan 12, 2027	Kris Anka cover: 978-1302966898
	Runaways by Rainbow Rowell	Runaways (vol.5) #1-38; Runaways (vol.6) #1-5	#63-105	Rainbow Rowell	Kris Anka, David Lafuente, Andres Genolet	Omnibus	1,040	Jan 12, 2027	Adrian Alphona DM cover: 978-1302966904

== Accolades ==
Year	Award	Category	Recipient	Result	Ref.
2005	Eisner Award	Best Writer	Brian K. Vaughan	Won	
2006	Harvey Award	Best Continuing or Limited Series	Runaways	Won	
2006	Shuster Award	Outstanding Artist	Adrian Alphona	Nominated	
2007	Peach Award	Georgia Peach Book Award For Teen Readers	Runaways	Nominated	
2007	Shuster Award	Outstanding Artist	Adrian Alphona	Nominated	
2009	Eisner Award	Best Cover Artist	Jo Chen	Nominated	
2019	GLAAD Media Award	Outstanding Comic Book	Runaways	Nominated	
2019	Eisner Award	Best Continuing Series	Runaways	Nominated	

== In other media ==
Promotion image of the Runaways from the 2017 television series of the same name (L:R: Ariela Barer as Gert Yorkes, Lyrica Okano as Nico Minoru, Rhenzy Feliz as Alex Wilder, Gregg Sulkin as Chase Stein, Virginia Gardner as Karolina Dean, Allegra Acosta as Molly Hernandez).

=== Television ===
In May 2008, a film version of the comic was in the scripting process, with Brian K. Vaughan writing and Kevin Feige, Marvel Studios President of Production, producing. Feige has said, "In our discussions with Brian, we wanted him to be the person to bring it to life. I think it won't be a precise story line of any [of his comics], but certainly it will be most similar to the tone or origins of his structure in its initial run". A 2011 release was considered, as Feige had expected a finished script in early 2009. In April 2010, Peter Sollett emerged as the front runner to direct the movie. In May 2010, British screenwriter Drew Pearce, known for the TV series No Heroics, was reported to be writing the film for Marvel Studios. In July 2010, it was reported that filming would begin sometime between March–July 2011. On August 5, 2010, preliminary casting for the film began.

In October 2010, production plans were halted when Marvel chose to focus on The Avengers. It was hoped that the film would be scheduled for release sometime in 2014, but the only two releases that year were Captain America: The Winter Soldier and Guardians of the Galaxy. In March 2013, Kevin Feige said during an interview that they elected not to make the film, but that Drew Pearce had been reassigned to Iron Man 3 on the strength of his Runaways script. On September 24, 2013, Pearce revealed that the film is currently shelved due to the success of The Avengers, but also suggested it could see a release at some point in the future.

While talking about All Hail the King, Pearce revealed he had been thinking about the possibility of Runaways being adapted as a TV series. In August 2016, Hulu ordered a pilot along with additional scripts for a Runaways TV series written by Josh Schwartz and Stephanie Savage. Filming will start in February 2017. It was later announced that Schwartz and Savage were jointly hired to be co-showrunners of the series. In February 2017, Head of Marvel Television, Jeph Loeb, announced that the roster of the team had been cast with Rhenzy Feliz, Lyrica Okano, Virginia Gardner, Ariela Barer, Gregg Sulkin, and Allegra Acosta will appear in the series as Alex Wilder, Nico Minoru, Karolina Dean, Gert Yorkes, Chase Stein, and Molly Hernandez respectively. Later that same month the cast for their parents, the team of supervillains known as The Pride, were announced. In July 2017, Jeph Loeb officially confirmed that it takes place in the Marvel Cinematic Universe.

=== Video games ===
- Nico Minoru (as Sister Grimm) appears as a playable character in Marvel: Future Fight.
- Nico Minoru, Karolina Dean, Victor Mancha, Chase Stein (alongside Old Lace) and Molly Hayes appear as playable characters in Playdom's Marvel: Avengers Alliance.
- The Runaways are playable characters in Lego Marvel Super Heroes 2 as part of a DLC Season Pass.
- Nico Minoru, Karolina Dean, Molly Hayes and Old Lace were playable characters in the freemium mobile game Marvel Avengers Academy until it shut down on February 4, 2019.
- Nico Minoru and Karolina Dean are playable 4 star characters in mobile game Marvel Puzzle Quest.
- Nico Minoru is a playable character in the role-playing game Marvel's Midnight Suns.
