= Dennis Hopeless =

American comic book writer

Dennis Hallum
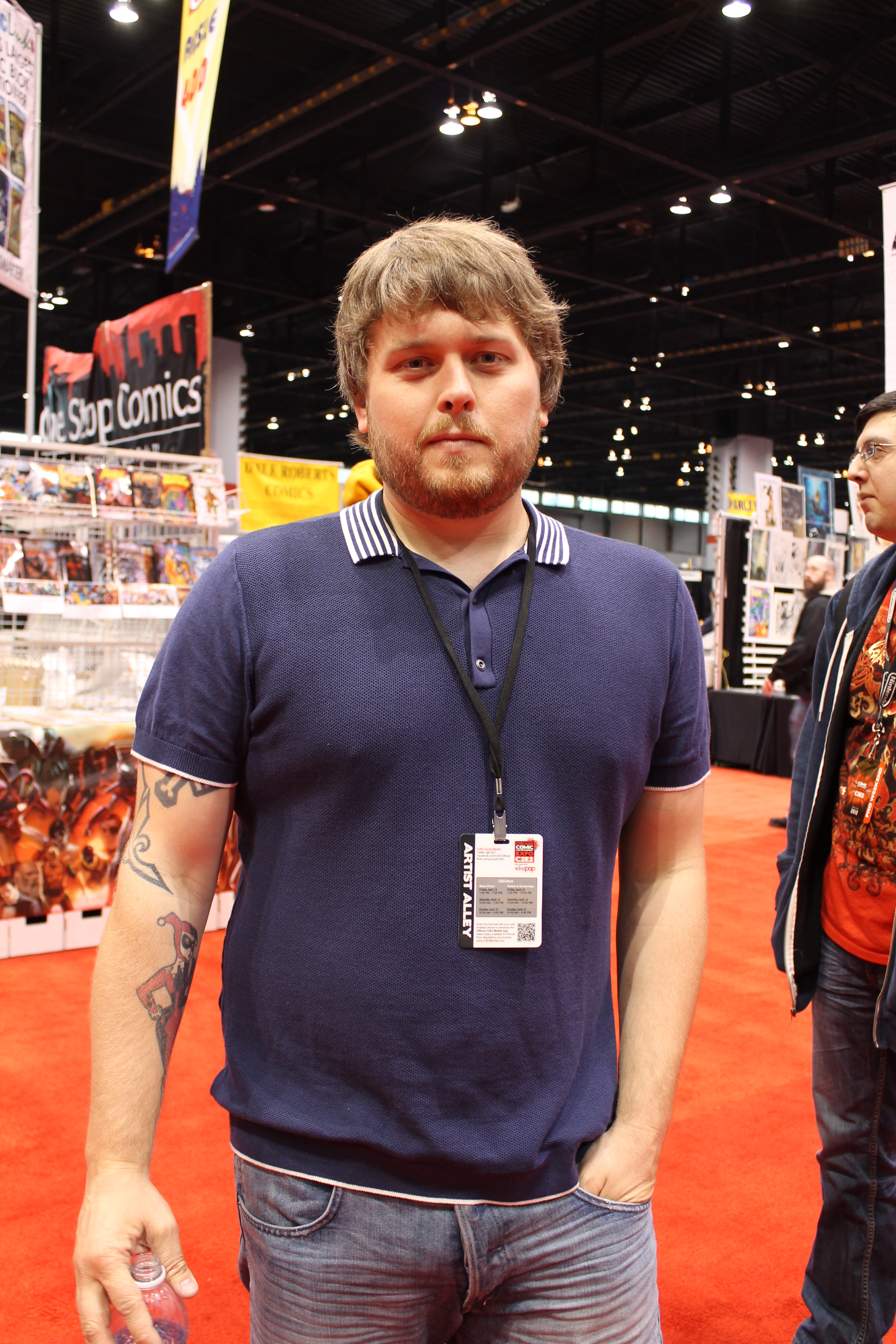
- Born: Kansas City, Missouri, U.S.
- Area: Writer
- Pseudonym: Dennis Hopeless
- Notable works: Cable and X-Force; Avengers Arena; Spider-Woman; All-New X-Men; Marvel's Spider-Man comics

Dennis Hallum, known professionally as Dennis Hopeless and Dennis "Hopeless" Hallum, is an American comic book writer from Kansas City, Missouri, who has written for Marvel, Image, Dark Horse, Boom! Studios, Arcana Studio and Oni Press.

Hallum has written multiple series starring teenage superheroes and has said that he "tend[s] to write about the challenge of growing up." He's been praised by critics for including a female point-of-view in his comics. After finding success with two creator-owned comics, Hallum began writing for Marvel in 2011. In 2015, Hallum wrote two limited series as part of Marvel's Secret Wars event. The following year, Hallum began scripting Marvel's relaunched ongoing series All-New X-Men. That same year, he resumed his writing duties on Marvel's Spider-Woman comic, the sixth volume of the character's ongoing series. The series earned Hallum some of the best reviews of his career, as he and his creative team received praise from feminist critics for showing the realities of motherhood. In 2017, Marvel published an ongoing Jean Grey comic, the character's first, with Hallum and artist Victor Ibanez at the helm.

== Career ==
Dennis Hallum worked in a comic store in the mid-2000s while trying to break into the comics industry. In 2007, using the pen name "Dennis Hopeless", he created GearHead (with penciller Kevin Mellon), a four-issue comic about a female auto mechanic searching for her lost brother. The series was published by Arcana Studio. His next notable work didn't hit shelves until 2011 when Hallum reunited with artist Kevin Mellon to create LoveSTRUCK, a supernatural graphic novel inspired in part by Frank Herbert's Dune and Garth Ennis's Preacher that was published by Image Comics. That same year, Hallum began working with Marvel Comics, writing the second volume of Legion of Monsters (with penciler Juan Doe). The series starred the titular Legion and monster-hunter Elsa Bloodstone.

While Legion of Monsters was still being published, Marvel hired Hallum (along with pencillers Jamie McKelvie and Mike Norton) to create a graphic novel called X-Men: Season One as part of a series of four graphic novels focusing on the origins of some of the company's biggest characters. While some publications were hesitant to embrace the Season One concept, Hallum's novel garnered generally positive reviews, with Comic Book Resources calling it, "easy to understand, fun to read and still pretty wide in scope."

Hallum's next work for Marvel was 2013's Avengers Arena, an 18-issue comic series in which the villain Arcade kidnaps 16 teenage superheroes and forces them to fight each other to the death. The series starred characters from Avengers Academy, the Runaways and Hallum's newly created Braddock Academy and featured covers referencing Lord of the Flies, The Hunger Games series, the game show Survivor, and the Japanese film Battle Royale. The comic won Hallum the 2013 Harvey Award for Most Promising New Talent. That same year, Hallum wrote Cable and X-Force (with artist Salvador Larroca), a 19-issue series that ran concurrently and eventually crossed over with Sam Humphries and Ron Garney's Uncanny X-Force Vol. 2. Also in 2013, Hallum co-wrote a 4-issue series called The Answer! with Eisner Award winning creator Mike Nolan for Dark Horse Comics. In 2014, Hallum and artist Kevin Walker authored Avengers Undercover, a direct follow-up series to Avengers Arena with many of the same characters.

Hallum's next project was the limited series All-New Captain America: Fear Him (with co-writer Rick Remender). Part of Marvel's Infinite Comics series, it starred Sam Wilson in his new role as Captain America. The following year, Hallum began working on the fifth volume of Marvel's Spider-Woman comic with penciler Greg Land and Big Thunder Mountain Railroad (with artist Tigh Walker), an all-ages western adventure comic based on the Disney theme park attraction. That summer, Marvel began their Secret Wars crossover event and Hallum wrote two books in the storyline, Inferno (with Javier Garron) and House of M (with Mark Failla), both based on previous Marvel events.

Upon the conclusion of the Secret Wars event, Marvel relaunched their Spider-Woman comic in January 2016 with Hallum now joined by artist Javier Rodríguez who had worked with Hallum on the previous volume after Land's departure. The relaunched series centered on Spider-Woman, Jessica Drew's newly announced pregnancy and impending motherhood. Critics praised the relatable, fun storytelling of the comic with IGN calling it, "laid back at times and outlandish at others" while scoring it an 8.6 out of 10. The following month, Hallum served as writer for another relaunched series, the second volume of All-New X-Men, a comic starring the time-displaced original X-Men now traveling the country with three young Jean Grey School students.

In late 2016, Hallum wrote the main story in a one-shot licensed comic called "WWE: Then, Now, Forever", which was published by Boom! Studios with Dan Mora providing the art. The comic became an ongoing series simply called WWE the following year with Hallum continuing to write the main story and Daniel Acuña replacing Mora on pencils.

Both the All-New X-Men and Spider-Woman ongoing series came to an end in May 2017 with both series receiving fairly positive reviews throughout their run. The final issue of Spider-Woman, in particular, garnered a great deal of positive sentiment, with The A.V. Club's Oliver Sava calling the series "one of Marvel’s most consistently entertaining, fun-loving titles" in his review of the issue. Continuing his work at Marvel, Hallum was tapped to take over writing duties for the Doctor Strange ongoing beginning with issue #21 as well as scripting a new Jean Grey series, the character's first ongoing solo book and part of Marvel's ResurrXion revamp. Hallum's first Dr. Strange issue and the first issue of the Jean Grey series will both have a cover date of July, 2017. After the end of Jean Grey in early 2018, Hallum continued writing for Marvel, including a digital Cloak and Dagger comic miniseries to coincide with the premier of the Freeform television series adaptation of the characters.

In January 2019, after having used the "Dennis Hopeless" pen name for many years, Hallum announced in a Twitter thread that he would begin using his given surname, Hallum, in his published works. To avoid audience confusion, however, he was credited as Dennis "Hopeless" Hallum. He later deleted the tweet.

In April 2019, Hallum wrote an issue of Darth Vader: Dark Visions that portrayed Darth Vader from the perspective of an unnamed female nurse obsessed with him. Her portrayal evoked strong criticism from fans. io9 commented that "Dark Visions' view of the nurse's desires takes established feminine power fantasies and treats them as delusional jokes, right up until the moment it leaves its female protagonist a crumbled heap on the floor."

== Personal life ==
Hallum is a Kansas State University alumnus. He lives in Kansas City, Missouri with his two sons.

== Awards ==
- 2013 - Harvey Award—Most Promising New Talent (for Avengers Arena)
- 2016 - GLAAD Media Award—Outstanding Comic Book (Nominee) (for All-New X-Men)

== Bibliography ==
=== Early work ===
- GearHead #1–4 (with Kevin Mellon, Arcana, 2007) collected as GearHead (tpb, 120 pages, 2008, ISBN 0-9763095-9-9)
- Action DoubleFeature #1: "The Answer" (co-written by Hopeless and Mike Norton, art by Norton, digital anthology, Four Star Studios, 2011)
  - The story was eventually continued in print as The Answer! #1–4 (co-written by Hopeless and Mike Norton, art by Norton, Dark Horse, 2013)
  - The series, along with the short story from Action DoubleFeature, was collected as The Answer! (tpb, 120 pages, 2013, ISBN 1-61655-197-6)

=== Image Comics ===
- Hack/Slash: Trailers, Part Two: "Too Cute" (with Kyle Strahm, anthology one-shot, 2010)
- LoveSTRUCK (with Kevin Mellon, graphic novel, 192 pages, 2011, ISBN 1-60706-447-2)
- Sea of Stars (co-written by Hopeless and Jason Aaron, art by Stephen Green, 2019–2021) collected as:
  - Lost in the Wild Heavens (collects #1–5, tpb, 136 pages, 2020, ISBN 1-5343-1495-4)
  - The People of the Broken Moon (collects #6–11, tpb, 120 pages, 2021, ISBN 1-5343-1834-8)

=== Marvel Comics ===
- Legion of Monsters #1–4 (with Juan Doe, 2011–2012) collected as Legion of Monsters (tpb, 96 pages, 2012, ISBN 0-7851-4057-3)
- X-Men:
  - X-Men: Season One (with Jamie McKelvie and Mike Norton, graphic novel, 136 pages, 2012, ISBN 0-7851-5645-3)
  - Cable and X-Force (with Salvador Larroca, Gerardo Sandoval (#15–17) and Angel Unzueta (#18–19), 2013–2014) collected as:
    - Wanted (collects #1–5, tpb, 136 pages, 2013, ISBN 0-7851-6690-4)
      - Includes the Forge short story (art by Gabriel Hernández Walta) from Marvel NOW! Point One (anthology one-shot, 2012)
    - Dead or Alive (collects #6–9, tpb, 96 pages, 2013, ISBN 0-7851-6691-2)
    - This Won't End Well (collects #10–14, tpb, 112 pages, 2014, ISBN 0-7851-8882-7)
      - Issues #12–13 are scripted by Cullen Bunn from Hopeless' plots.
    - Vendetta (collects #15–19, tpb, 152 pages, 2014, ISBN 0-7851-8946-7)
  - Secret Wars: Inferno #1–5 (with Javier Garrón, 2015) collected as Secret Wars — Warzones: Inferno (tpb, 112 pages, 2015, ISBN 0-7851-9873-3)
  - Secret Wars: House of M #1–4 (with Marco Failla (#1–2) and Ario Anindito (#3–4), 2015) collected as Secret Wars — Warzones: House of M (tpb, 120 pages, 2016, ISBN 0-7851-9872-5)
    - Issues #2–4 are scripted by Cullen Bunn from Hopeless' plots.
  - All-New X-Men vol. 2 (with Mark Bagley, Paco Diaz (#8 and 19), 2016–2017) collected as:
    - Inevitable — Ghost of the Cyclops (collects #1–6, tpb, 136 pages, 2016, ISBN 0-7851-9630-7)
    - Inevitable — Apocalypse Wars (collects #7–12, tpb, 136 pages, 2016, ISBN 0-7851-9631-5)
    - Inevitable — Hell Hath So Much Fury (collects #13–16, tpb, 112 pages, 2016, ISBN 1-302-90291-1)
    - Inevitable — IvX (collects #17–19, tpb, 112 pages, 2017, ISBN 1-302-90523-6)
  - Jean Grey (with Víctor Ibáñez, Harvey Tolibao (#4), Anthony Piper (#5), Paul Davidson (#6), Alberto Alburquerque (#7, 10–11), 2017–2018) collected as:
    - Nightmare Fuel (collects #1–6, tpb, 136 pages, 2017, ISBN 1-302-90877-4)
    - Final Fight (collects #7–11, tpb, 136 pages, 2018, ISBN 1-302-90878-2)
  - Domino vol. 3 Annual #1: "Rebound" (with Leonard Kirk, co-feature, 2018) collected in Domino: Soldier of Fortune (tpb, 128 pages, 2019, ISBN 1-302-91484-7)
- Avengers Arena #1–18 (with Kev Walker, Alessandro Vitti (#4 and 7), Riccardo Burchielli (#10–11) and Karl Moline (#16), 2013–2014) collected as Avengers Arena: The Complete Collection (tpb, 408 pages, 2018, ISBN 1-302-91185-6)
- Avengers Undercover #1–10 (with Kev Walker, Timothy Green II (#3, 6, 9) and Tigh Walker (#8 and 10), 2014) collected as Avengers Undercover: The Complete Collection (tpb, 224 pages, 2018, ISBN 1-302-91393-X)
- All-New Captain America: Fear Him #1–6 (co-written by Hopeless and Rick Remender, art by Szymon Kudranski, 2014)
  - The digital series was first published in print as a 4-issue limited series titled All-New Captain America: Fear Him (2015)
  - Collected in Captain America: Sam Wilson — The Complete Collection Volume 1 (tpb, 488 pages, 2020, ISBN 1-302-92325-0)
  - Collected in Captain America by Rick Remender Omnibus (hc, 1,080 pages, 2021, ISBN 1-302-93047-8)
- AXIS: Revolutions #1: "With Great Hate" (with Ken Lashley, anthology, 2014) collected in AXIS: Revolutions (tpb, 96 pages, 2015, ISBN 0-7851-9768-0)
- Spider-Woman:
  - Spider-Woman vol. 5 (with Greg Land, Javier Rodríguez and Natacha Bustos (#10), 2015) collected as:
    - Spider-Verse (collects #1–4, tpb, 112 pages, 2015, ISBN 0-7851-5458-2)
    - New Duds (collects #5–10, tpb, 136 pages, 2016, ISBN 0-7851-5459-0)
  - Spider-Woman vol. 6 (with Javier Rodríguez, Joëlle Jones (#6–7), Veronica Fish and Tigh Walker (#12), 2016–2017) collected as:
    - Shifting Gears — Baby Talk (collects #1–5, tpb, 120 pages, 2016, ISBN 0-7851-9622-6)
      - Includes the "What to Expect" short story (art by Javier Rodríguez) from The Amazing Spider-Man vol. 4 #1 (2015)
    - Spider-Women (includes #6–7, tpb, 136 pages, 2016, ISBN 1-302-90093-5)
      - Also collects the Spider-Women: Alpha one-shot (co-written by Hopeless, Jason Latour and Robbie Thompson, art by Vanesa del Rey, 2016)
      - Also collects the Spider-Women: Omega one-shot (co-written by Hopeless, Jason Latour and Robbie Thompson, art by Nico Leon, 2016)
    - Shifting Gears — Civil War II (collects #8–12, tpb, 112 pages, 2016, ISBN 0-7851-9623-4)
    - Shifting Gears — Scare Tactics (collects #13–17, tpb, 112 pages, 2017, ISBN 1-302-90330-6)
- Big Thunder Mountain Railroad #1–5 (with Tigh Walker, Felix Ruiz (#3) and Guillermo Mogorrón (#4–5), 2015) collected as Big Thunder Mountain Railroad (hc, 128 pages, 2015, ISBN 0-7851-9701-X; tpb, 2021, ISBN 1-302-92660-8)
- Doctor Strange vol. 4 #21–24: "Secret Empire" (with Niko Henrichon, 2017) collected in Doctor Strange: Secret Empire (tpb, 136 pages, 2018, ISBN 1-302-90589-9)
- Cloak and Dagger (digital):
  - Cloak and Dagger: Shades of Grey #1–6 (with David Messina and Francesco Manna (#5), 2018) collected as Cloak and Dagger: Shades of Grey (tpb, 136 pages, 2018, ISBN 1-302-91161-9)
  - Cloak and Dagger: Negative Exposure #1–3 (with Francesco Manna and Ruairí Coleman, 2018–2019) collected as Cloak and Dagger: Negative Exposure (tpb, 136 pages, 2019, ISBN 1-302-91510-X)
- Marvel Strike Force Prequel (with Andrea Di Vito, free promotional one-shot given away at San Diego Comic-Con, 2018)
- Infinity Warps: Arachknight #1–2 (with Alé Garza, 2018) collected in Infinity Warps: Two-in-One (tpb, 280 pages, 2019, ISBN 1-302-91470-7)
- Journey into Mystery: The Birth of Krakoa (with Djibril Morissette-Phan, one-shot, 2018) collected in Marvel Universe: Time and Again (tpb, 232 pages, 2019, ISBN 1-302-91597-5)
- Love Romances: "French Quartered" (with Annapaola Martello, anthology one-shot, 2019) collected in Marvel Universe: Timeless Tales (tpb, 152 pages, 2019, ISBN 1-302-91755-2)
- Star Wars: Vader — Dark Visions #1–5 (with Paolo Villanelli (#1), Brian Level (#2), David López (#3), Stephen Mooney (#4), Geraldo Borges (#5), 2019) collected as Star Wars: Vader — Dark Visions (tpb, 128 pages, 2019, ISBN 1-302-91900-8)
- Marvel's Spider-Man (Gamerverse):
  - Marvel's Spider-Man: City at War #1–6 (with Michele Bandini and Luca Maresca (#5), 2019) collected as Marvel's Spider-Man: City at War (tpb, 144 pages, 2019, ISBN 1-302-91901-6)
  - Marvel's Spider-Man: Velocity #1–5 (with Emilio Laiso, 2019–2020) collected as Marvel's Spider-Man: Velocity (tpb, 112 pages, 2020, ISBN 1-302-91922-9)
  - Marvel's Spider-Man: The Black Cat Strikes #1–5 (with Luca Maresca, 2020) collected as Marvel's Spider-Man: The Black Cat Strikes (tpb, 112 pages, 2020, ISBN 1-302-91925-3)
- War of the Realms: Strikeforce — The War Avengers (with Kim Jacinto, one-shot, 2019) collected in War of the Realms: Strikeforce (tpb, 112 pages, 2019, ISBN 1-302-91855-9)
- Revenge of the Cosmic Ghost Rider #1–5 (with Scott Hepburn, 2020) collected as Revenge of the Cosmic Ghost Rider (tpb, 128 pages, 2020, ISBN 1-302-92170-3)

=== Other publishers ===
- Invader Zim #10 (co-written by Hopeless and his wife Jessie, art by Dave Crosland, Oni Press, 2016)
  - Collected in Invader Zim Volume 2 (tpb, 136 pages, 2016, ISBN 1-62010-336-2)
  - Collected in Invader Zim: The Deluxe Edition Volume 1 (hc, 328 pages, 2017, ISBN 1-62010-413-X)
- WWE (Boom! Studios):
  - WWE (with Serg Acuña, Tim Lattie (#7–8, 10–12) and Kendall Goode (#16–17, 23), 2017–2019) collected as:
    - Redesign. Rebuild. Reclaim (collects #1–4, tpb, 144 pages, 2017, ISBN 1-60886-944-X)
      - Includes the "Breaking of the Shield" short story (art by Dan Mora) from WWE: Then. Now. Forever. (anthology one-shot, 2016)
    - Lunatic Fringe (collects #5–8, tpb, 112 pages, 2018, ISBN 1-68415-062-0)
    - Roman Empire (collects #9–12, tpb, 112 pages, 2018, ISBN 1-68415-202-X)
    - Women's Evolution (collects #14–17, tpb, 112 pages, 2018, ISBN 1-68415-283-6)
    - The Sami and Kevin Show (collects #18–20, tpb, 112 pages, 2019, ISBN 1-68415-317-4)
    - The Phenomenal One (collects #21–25, tpb, 128 pages, 2019, ISBN 1-68415-389-1)
  - WWE: WrestleMania 2017 Special: "The Long Con" (with Dan Mora, anthology one-shot, 2017) collected in WWE: Then. Now. Forever. Volume 1 (tpb, 128 pages, 2018, ISBN 1-68415-128-7)
  - WWE Survivor Series 2017 Special: "The Montreal Screwjob" (with Lucas Werneck, anthology one-shot, 2017) collected in WWE: Then. Now. Forever. Volume 2 (tpb, 128 pages, 2018, ISBN 1-68415-257-7)
  - WWE: NXT TakeOver (tpb, 160 pages, 2019, ISBN 1-68415-341-7) collects:
    - WWE: NXT Takeover — The Blueprint (with Jake Elphick, one-shot, 2018)
    - WWE: NXT Takeover — Proving Ground (with Kendall Goode, one-shot, 2018)
    - WWE: NXT Takeover — Into the Fire (with Hyeonjin Kim, one-shot, 2018)
    - WWE: NXT Takeover — Redemption (with Rodrigo Lorenzo, one-shot, 2018)
- DC Comics:
  - The Infected: Scarab (with Freddie Williams II, one-shot, 2020) collected in Year of the Villain: The Infected (tpb, 152 pages, 2020, ISBN 1-77950-254-0)
  - War for Earth-3 (tpb, 176 pages, 2022, ISBN 1-77951-803-X) includes:
    - War for Earth-3 #1–2 (co-written by Hopeless and Robbie Thompson, art by Steve Pugh + Dexter Soy + Brent Peeples (#1) and Kieran McKeown + Ariel Olivetti + Julio Ferreira (#2), 2022)
    - Suicide Squad vol. 7 #13: "War for Earth-3, Part 2" (co-written by Hopeless and Robbie Thompson, art by Eduardo Pansica, Julio Ferreira and Dexter Soy, 2022)
- X-O Manowar (Valiant):
  - X-O Manowar vol. 5 (with Emilio Laiso and Jim Towe (#8), 2020–2021) collected as:
    - Book One (collects #1–4, tpb, 112 pages, 2021, ISBN 1-68215-368-1)
    - Book Two (collects #5–9, tpb, 128 pages, 2022, ISBN 1-68215-388-6)
  - Valiant FCBD 2021 (untitled 5-page story, with Emilio Laiso, co-feature in one-shot, 2021)
- Heart Eyes #1–5 (with Víctor Ibáñez, Vault, 2022) collected as Heart Eyes: The Complete Series (tpb, 144 pages, 2023, ISBN 1-63849-173-9)
- The Kármán Line (with Piotr Kowalski, graphic novel, 96 pages, Mad Cave Studios, 2023, ISBN 1-60706-447-2)

Preceded by Rick Remender (Uncanny X-Force)	Cable and X-Force writer 2013–2014 (with Cullen Bunn in 2014)	Succeeded by Simon Spurrier (X-Force vol. 4)
Preceded by Brian Michael Bendis	Spider-Woman writer 2015–2017	Succeeded by Karla Pacheco
Preceded by Brian Michael Bendis	All-New X-Men writer 2016–2017	Succeeded by n/a
Preceded by Jason Aaron	Doctor Strange writer 2017	Succeeded by Donny Cates
Preceded by Matt Kindt	X-O Manowar writer 2020–2021	Succeeded by Becky Cloonan; Michael W. Conrad (X-O Manowar Unconquered)
