= Arcade (Marvel Comics) =

Marvel Comics fictional character

- Arcade as depicted in X-Factor vol. 3 #30 (June 2008). Art by Glenn Fabry.

Publication information
- Publisher: Marvel Comics
- First appearance: Marvel Team-Up #65 (January 1978)
- Created by: Chris Claremont; John Byrne

In-story information
- Place of origin: Murderworld
- Team affiliations: Masters of Evil; Crazy Gang
- Notable aliases: Mister A, "Mad Monk," Pinball Wizard, A.R. Cadenski
- Abilities: Genius intelligence; Skilled inventor and engineer

Arcade is a supervillain appearing in American comic books published by Marvel Comics. He first appeared in 1978's Marvel Team-Up #65, the creation of writer Chris Claremont and/or writer/artist John Byrne. The character is a combination of an evil genius and a hitman who carries out his assassinations via a personally designed amusement park outfitted with elaborate traps, often referred to as Murderworld. (Note: Published stories are inconsistent as to whether Arcade's base of operations is spelled as one word ("Murderworld") or two words ("Murder World"), but the one word spelling is the more common one.)

Over the years Arcade has targeted a multitude of Marvel heroes, often focusing on the X-Men and associated members of X-Factor, X-Force and Excalibur. In what is considered the "game changer" for Arcade, Avengers Arena, he kidnaps 16 superpowered teens and forces them to kill each other for survival in Murderworld; unlike most Murderworld schemes, this endeavor yields several casualties.

Arcade has appeared in a number of other Marvel properties outside of comic books, in X-Men: Evolution voiced by Gabe Khouth, and in the Ultimate Spider-Man animated series voiced by Eric Bauza. He has also appeared as one of the main villains in a number of video games, including X-Men: Madness in Murderworld, Spider-Man/X-Men: Arcade's Revenge, Marvel: Ultimate Alliance, Spider-Man: Edge of Time and Marvel: Avengers Alliance.

== Publication history ==
Arcade's first full appearance in Marvel Team-Up #66.

Arcade was created by Chris Claremont and/or John Byrne, and first appeared in Marvel Team-Up #65. In 2025, Claremont stated that he could not recall whether Arcade was created by himself, Byrne, or both jointly. Few details about Arcade are given in Marvel Team-Up #65, and his face is never shown to readers, leaving him to be more fully revealed in Marvel Team-Up #66.

Arcade's debut storyline was reprinted shortly thereafter in the black-and-white comic Marvel UK title Super Spider-Man & Captain Britain #248 published on November 8, 1977.

Arcade's nature meant he was not confined to any specific series. Nonetheless, nearly all of his appearances have been in the X-Men family of titles. His earliest encounter with the X-Men occurred in the pages of Uncanny X-Men #122–124. Some time later he would encounter the team again, this time in a male damsel in distress role as the X-Men fight to save him from his captor Doctor Doom in issues #145-147. Arcade also serves as a victim in need of rescue in The Uncanny X-Men #197 and the one-shot Colossus #1.

In the 1995 limited series Wolverine/Gambit: Victims, Arcade was redesigned as heavily deformed with an elongated grin.

== Fictional character biography ==
Arcade affects a manner of dress and speech that makes him appear to be a comedic character. This is part of his overall theme, which extends into his preferred method of murder, an underground funhouse of colorful deathtraps, usually decked out in cheery colors and disguised as an amusement park, which he has dubbed "Murderworld".

Arcade's background, up to and including his real name, remains largely unknown. He claims that he was born into a wealthy family and lived much of his early life, depending on the telling, on a ranch in Texas, or in a mansion in Beverly Hills. At the age of either eighteen or twenty-one, his allowance was cut off by his father, who declared that he did not deserve it. In retaliation, Arcade murders his father, thus inheriting his money.

Arcade became a freelance assassin, traveling across the world, killing people in rather mundane fashions, and amassing even more wealth than he already had. Discovering an aptitude for technology, Arcade designed and built his first Murderworld, a subterranean evil lair disguised as an amusement park. From this base, and with the help of two mysterious assistants named Miss Locke and Mr. Chambers, he reemerged as the world's most expensive hitman. For the price of $1 million, he tailors Murderworld to exploit the specific weaknesses of his targets and then kill them with a variety of colorful deathtraps.

Since no one in their right mind would enter Murderworld willingly, Arcade must first capture his targets so that he can place them within Murderworld. This raises the question of why he does not simply kill them once he has captured them, and not bother with the expense of building and maintaining Murderworld. An answer is provided in the twist ending of Marvel Team-Up #66: Arcade's primary interest is in the fun and excitement of taking on worthy opponents, and he is indifferent to whether he actually succeeds in killing his targets. Because of this, he always deliberately leaves each target a small chance of survival, and sets them free without a fuss if they find it. This sets Arcade apart from most other villains who use deathtraps; while most villains believe that their death machines are infallible, Arcade gives them a chance on purpose, for the sport of it.

Arcade, from X-Men #122 (June 1979). Art by John Byrne and Terry Austin.

Since his first attempt to kill Spider-Man and Captain Britain, Arcade has tangled, at one time or another, with a large number of heroes. In addition to battling the X-Men, X-Factor, X-Force and Excalibur as groups, he has attempted to kill many individual members, usually in pairs.

Courtney Ross is one of the few non-super-powered civilians to escape Arcade's attention. She survives for some time due to outwitting multiple opponents, such as the Crazy Gang, and discovers a talent for improvisational comedy. In the end, she is rescued by the superhero team Excalibur. The situation gives Ross a new outlook and appreciation for life, though she is killed by an unrelated villain after her escape.

In another confrontation with Excalibur, Arcade traps the team in a Murderworld programmed as a Looney Tunes parody, called the Loonies. He conducts this operation while in prison.

At one point Arcade entraps the two otherworldly warriors, Adam X and Shatterstar, who team up to survive his plans. Arcade is astonished as the two (mostly Adam) kill several of his employees. This causes him to state that the clients will be receiving a refund and the two are not to be dealt with in the future. Shatterstar attempts to kill Arcade, but he only destroys a robotic double.

Arcade, having taken his show on the road, joins up with Johnny Blaze's Quentin Carnival; his Murderworld folded out from the back of a semi. Blaze rampages through the fold-out Murderworld, which he discovers is infested with demonic beings, destroying all the obstacles in his sight and killing what he can. He then leaves Arcade trapped in its depths. Arcade's trailer, now more normal-shaped, is driven out into the desert and abandoned.

Prior to a confrontation with Wolverine and Gambit, Arcade murders Miss Locke in a fit of rage. During the struggle, she wounded him with a carving knife and scarred his face. Arcade builds android replicas of Locke to replace her.

Arcade is responsible for the destruction of District X, as part of a botched plan to kidnap X-Factor's Rictor.

=== Avengers Arena and Undercover ===
In a shift from his usual modus operandi, Arcade is responsible for the "Avengers Arena". He and a new associate named Miss Coriander abduct 16 teenage superheroes and strand them on a deserted island, re-modified as an elaborate Murderworld location, forcing them to fight to the death.

In Avengers Undercover, Arcade cashes on the success of Avengers Arena in Bagalia. The survivors of Murderworld reunite and are convinced to kill Arcade in revenge for his actions. It is later revealed that Arcade survived and was imprisoned by Baron Zemo, with a clone of Hazmat having died in his place.

=== Partnership with Wilson Fisk ===
Arcade moves his enterprises to Las Vegas and was embroiled in his usual games of life and death with Elektra. In addition, he collaborates with Screwball, giving her the training, equipment, and exclusive streaming rights that she needs. During this encounter he revealed that he had partnered with Wilson Fisk to eliminate certain heroes "from the board". After Elektra ends his Vegas operation, Arcade travels to Madripoor and encounters Spider-Man and Deadpool. Additionally, he vows to no longer target mutants in his endeavors.

=== Arcade Industries ===
In the "Hunted" storyline, Arcade assists Kraven the Hunter and his clone, Last Son of Kraven, in preparation for his upcoming hunt in Central Park. As part of this hunt, many animal-themed villains are captured to be hunted for sport. Arcade's Hunter-Bots are unleashed on the villains and manage to kill several of them before the hunt ends.

== Powers and abilities ==
Arcade has no superhuman powers but has knowledge of technology far ahead of conventional science, particularly in the fields of robotics and mechanical and electrical engineering. How he acquired this knowledge is never revealed. Usually when he appears to be captured, it turns out to be a robot. It is implied that he is an expert in conventional assassination, including ranged weapons, poison, and sabotage, all of which became elements in Murderworld.

In Agent X #5, it was revealed that Arcade also has some medical skills.

In Avengers Arena, Arcade easily held back a cadre of 16 high-powered teenage superheroes seemingly without having to resort to mechanical or technological devices. He displayed the ability to create force fields, proved to be nearly invulnerable to energy blasts without the force field, controlled the motor functions of his 16 captives all at the same time, and employed telekinesis. However, these abilities are the result of technology provided by his henchwoman, Miss Coriander, and can only be manifested within the confines of the Antarctica Murderworld.

== Associates ==
- Miss Locke – Arcade's bodyguard and chief enforcer, is an expert in martial arts and gun combat. According to a flashback sequence in Avengers Arena #7 (2013), he murdered her in cold blood despite her years of faithful service once she, in Arcade's mind, had tried to get "too close" to him by having an emotional and physical relationship. This directly contradicts the original depiction of Locke's death, in Wolverine/Gambit: Victims #4 (December 1995), which shows that Arcade killed her in an uncontrollable fit of rage in reaction to her slashing his face with a carving knife.
- Mr. Chambers – Arcade's henchman, who has displayed electronic and mechanical skill and is thus in charge of Murderworld's system operations and maintenance. In several appearances, he directly captures others for transport to Murderworld.
- Miss Coriander – Arcade's latest henchwoman, she claims to be responsible for the vast array of powers that Arcade employs in "Avengers Arena". She appears to far surpass even Arcade in terms of knowledge about superhuman powers and how to counter them, and has gifted Arcade with a vastly powerful set of abilities that she has purloined from cutting-edge technology, exotic energy sources, and magical power. Coriander betrays Arcade after his supposed death and joins the Masters of Evil.

== Other versions ==
- An alternate universe version of Arcade appears in Age of Apocalypse. This version is a member of the Marauders before being killed by Gwen Stacy and Clint Barton.
- An alternate universe version of Arcade appears in Age of X. This version is Harcourt Teesdale, the prison governor of the Alcatraz Island mutant prison, before being killed by Basilisk.
- An alternate universe version of Arcade appears in Deadpool Kills the Marvel Universe.
- An alternate universe version of Arcade appears in Marvel Adventures.
- An alternate universe version of Arcade appears in Secret Wars as a resident of Battleworld and the master of ceremonies at the Killiseum arena before being killed by the Ghost Riders.
- An alternate universe version of Arcade appears in Ultimate X-Men. This version is a gaming prodigy and skilled hunter who possesses a hatred of mutants due to Magneto killing his sister.
- An alternate universe version of Arcade appears in What If? #111 as one of several villains killed by Wolverine.

== In other media ==
=== Television ===
- Arcade appears in the X-Men: Evolution episode "Fun and Games", voiced by Gabe Khouth. This version is identified as Webber Torque, a high school student and gamer.
- Arcade appears in the Ultimate Spider-Man episode "Game Over", voiced by Eric Bauza. This version is an technopathic Asian-American mutant who uses his abilities to lure superheroes to Madland for his own amusement, regardless of his actions' possible consequences.
- Arcade appears in M.O.D.O.K., voiced by Alan Tudyk.

=== Video games ===
- Arcade appears in X-Men: Madness in Murderworld.
- Arcade appears in Spider-Man and the X-Men in Arcade's Revenge.
- Arcade appears as a boss in Marvel: Ultimate Alliance, voiced by Quinton Flynn. This version is a member of Doctor Doom's Masters of Evil. Additionally, Murderworld appears as a stage.
- A Marvel 2099-inspired incarnation of Arcade appears in the Nintendo DS version of Spider-Man: Edge of Time, voiced by Jim Cummings. This version controls a cyber-arena game called Murder Galaxy to hunt heroes in front of a live audience.
- Arcade appears in Marvel Puzzle Quest. This version is identified as Edward Acra.
- Arcade appears in Marvel: Avengers Alliance.
- Arcade appears in Marvel Contest of Champions.

=== Merchandise ===
Arcade received an action figure in the Marvel Legends line in June 2021.

== Reception ==
Sara Century of Collider expressed interest in seeing Arcade in the X-Men '97 series.
