= Reunion (Runaways) =

- Runaways episode
- New York Comic Con 2017 poster
- Episode no.: Season 1 Episode 1
- Directed by: Brett Morgen
- Written by: Josh Schwartz; Stephanie Savage
- Cinematography by: Ramsey Nickell
- Editing by: Jeff Granzow
- Original air date: November 21, 2017
- Running time: 53 minutes

Guest appearances
- Mark Adair-Rios as Walter; Danielle Campbell as Eiffel; Zayne Emory as Brandon; Timothy Granaderos as Lucas; Dinora Walcott as nurse; Nicole Wolf as Destiny; Jose Joey Abril little creeper; Cesar A. Garcia as big creeper; Soraya Kelly as parishioner; Pat Lentz as Aura; Heather Alt as Francis; Archana Rajan as Megan; Matthew Salisbury as Lyft driver; Ric Sarabia as decrepit figure; Evan Seidlitz as Furry Bear; Robert van Guelpen as customer; Amy Waller as Lisbeth

Episode chronology
← Previous —	Next → "Rewind"

"Reunion" is the pilot and first episode of the American television series Runaways, based on Marvel Comics superhero team of the same name. It is set in the Marvel Cinematic Universe (MCU), sharing continuity with the films and other television series of the franchise. The pilot was written by series creators Josh Schwartz and Stephanie Savage, with Brett Morgen directing.

Rhenzy Feliz, Lyrica Okano, Virginia Gardner, Ariela Barer, Gregg Sulkin, and Allegra Acosta star as the Runaways, with Angel Parker, Ryan Sands, Annie Wersching, Kip Pardue, Ever Carradine, James Marsters, Brigid Brannagh, Kevin Weisman, Brittany Ishibashi, and James Yaegashi starring as their parents, the Pride. A pilot for a series based on the Runaways was ordered in August 2016, with Schwartz and Savage attached. The cast was announced in February 2017, with filming beginning later that month in Los Angeles and ending in March. Morgen focused on differentiating between the gritty world of the Runaways and the more stylistic world of the Pride.

"Reunion" was released for streaming on Hulu on November 21, 2017, and made its broadcast debut on Freeform on August 2, 2018.

== Plot ==
A young woman named Destiny Gonzalez arrives in Los Angeles and is offered a safe place to live by a woman on behalf of the Church of Gibborim. Six months later, Alex Wilder is suffering from isolation due to having not spoken to his friends in two years due to an incident involving the death of one of his friend's sister, Amy. His parents, Geoffrey and Catherine, try to bond with him, but he pushes them away. Nico Minoru, a goth, is forbidden to enter Amy's room by her strict mother Tina, while her father Robert tries to console her. Chase Stein, an athlete who possess a hidden intellect, is berated by his father, Victor, due to getting a C in Spanish while his mother, Janet, looks on. Karolina Dean is the daughter of Church of Gibborim founder Leslie Dean whose husband, Frank, is a former A-list actor who feels suppressed by the church. Sarcastic social justice warrior Gert Yorkes and her adoptive sister Molly Hernandez are dropped off at school by vegan biologists Dale and Stacey Yorkes.

At school, Alex decides to invite his former friends over to his house so they can bond again, but they all either ignore or flat out refuse due to their differing opinions and personalities. Karolina is teased by the other classmates who call her brainwashed due to her connection to the church, but manages to find solace in Nico who ignores Alex when he asks her directly to come hang out. Chase attempts to get his Spanish teacher to give him another shot at raising his grade. When he refuses, Gert offers to tutor Chase instead. He agrees only to accept an invitation to a house party. At dance tryouts, Molly begins to suffer from stomach cramps and goes to the nurse's office thinking it is puberty, only to learn that she has super strength. Despite this, Alex had his mom order six pizzas which he now feels he will have to eat himself.

While filming a commercial for the church, Karolina meets Destiny who is a fully committed member of the church. Impressed with her independence, Karolina asks her what it is like to rebel. Leslie in the meantime has a badly scarred man with a gas mask hidden in an office of the church. She soon joins the other members of the Pride, consisting of all the kids' parents (minus Frank), at the Wilder's residence for a "meeting". Nico heads out to the beach and builds a bonfire in an attempt to perform a spirit summoning, presumably so she can contact her sister. The ritual fails and she tosses her journal into the fire. Gert heads to Timely Coffee to tutor Chase, but slowly realizes that he is not coming. Molly arrives home and tests her super strength on the family van, but tires out afterwards and sleeps.

Chase arrives at the party, but begins to feel out of place. Karolina arrives too and is given a pill that will "free" her. She removes her Gibborim bracelet for the first time (she claims that she can't remember ever taking it off) and begins to glow rainbow colors only to pass out. Members of Chase's lacrosse team take her unconscious body and prepare to rape her, but Chase arrives and rescues her. Karolina asks that she not be left alone and that they go "anywhere, but home". She tosses away the pill that she was given earlier. Gert texts Molly to feed the animals in the basement. When she spots what looks like a dinosaur she panics and calls Gert to take her away. Chase, Gert, Molly, Karolina and Nico arrive at Alex's house and the six confront each other's current behavior as well as Amy's unexpected death (the incident that broke them up). Bored by the conversation, Chase suggests going into Geoffrey's study to sample his liquor. The group are surprised to find that their parents are not in there. Alex discovers a lever that opens a secret passageway. The group venture down and discover their parents in red robes forcing Destiny into a glowing coffin. Molly tries to snap a photo on her phone that seems to alert the parents, but the children flee before they can be spotted.

== Production ==
=== Development ===
Marvel's Runaways was announced in August 2016, from Marvel Television, ABC Signature Studios, and Fake Empire, with the streaming service Hulu ordering a pilot episode and scripts for a full season. Josh Schwartz and Stephanie Savage had been developing the series with Marvel for a year before this announcement, and were set to write the pilot and showrun the series. Brett Morgen revealed in May 2017 that he had directed the episode, which was later revealed to be titled "Reunion".

Morgen, a documentary filmmaker who has "no interest in directing episodic television" but is interested in creating pilots that establish series, had worked with Hulu on a pilot called When the Streetlights Go On in 2016. Though that pilot was not picked up to series due to budgetary concerns, Hulu was impressed with Morgen's work and recommended him to Marvel Television's Jeph Loeb for the Runaways pilot. After watching When the Streetlights Go On, Loeb immediately called Morgen to offer him the Runaways job.

=== Writing ===
Schwartz was a fan of the Runaways comic for some time, and introduced it to Savage, saying, "When you're a teenager, everything feels like life and death, and the stakes in this story—really felt like that." Loeb described the series as The O.C. of the Marvel Cinematic Universe (MCU), which Schwartz said meant "treating the problems of teenagers as if they are adults" and having the series "feel true and authentic to the teenage experience, even in this heightened context". The pilot tells a story from the Runaways' perspective, with the next episode then showing the same story from their parents'—the Pride—perspective.

=== Casting ===
In February 2017, Marvel announced the casting of the Runaways, with Rhenzy Feliz as Alex Wilder, Lyrica Okano as Nico Minoru, Virginia Gardner as Karolina Dean, Ariela Barer as Gert Yorkes, Gregg Sulkin as Chase Stein, and Allegra Acosta as Molly Hernandez. Shortly after, Marvel announced the casting of the Pride, with Ryan Sands as Geoffrey Wilder, Angel Parker as Catherine Wilder, Brittany Ishibashi as Tina Minoru, James Yaegashi as Robert Minoru, Kevin Weisman as Dale Yorkes, Brigid Brannagh as Stacey Yorkes, Annie Wersching as Leslie Dean, Kip Pardue as Frank Dean, James Marsters as Victor Stein, and Ever Carradine as Janet Stein.

Guest starring in the episode are Mark Adair-Rios as Walter, Danielle Campbell as Eiffel, Zayne Emory as Brandon, Timothy Granaderos as Lucas, Dinora Walcott as nurse, Nicole Wolf as Destiny, Jose Joey Abril as little creeper, Cesar A. Garcia as big creeper, Soraya Kelly as parishioner, Pat Lentz as Aura, Heather Alt as Francis, Archana Rajan as Megan, Matthew Salisbury as Lyft driver, Ric Sarabia as decrepit figure, Evan Seidlitz as Furry Bear, Robert van Guelpen as customer, and Amy Waller as Lisbeth.

=== Filming ===
Filming on the episode began by February 10, 2017, in Los Angeles, under the working title Rugrats, and concluded on March 3. Morgen described himself as "not a Marvel guy", but found directing the episode to be an interesting challenge. He said, "It wasn't a stretch for me to figure out that they wanted me to bring a level of authenticity to the show, and to bring a certain sense of grit and cinematic gravitas." Morgen was given free rein by Marvel and Hulu to establish the look of the series, and looked to differentiate between the world of the Runaways and that of the Pride; Morgen used more hand-held techniques for the Runaways to give them "edge and grit", while he tried to create "something to toy with, stylistically and visually" for the parents that could be explored more by the series moving forward.

== Marketing ==
Cast members and Schwartz and Savage appeared at New York Comic Con 2017 to promote the series, where "Reunion" was screened. The series had its red carpet premiere at the Regency Bruin Theatre in Westwood, Los Angeles on November 16, 2017.

== Release ==
"Reunion" premiered on Hulu in the United States on November 21, 2017. It was broadcast on Showcase in Canada, on November 22, and on Syfy in the United Kingdom on April 18, 2018. It made its broadcast debut in the United States on Freeform on August 2, 2018, following the airing of the first-season finale of Cloak & Dagger; the airing was part of Freeform's ongoing marketing partnership with Hulu. The airing received 231,000 live viewers.

== Reception ==
The review aggregator website Rotten Tomatoes reported an 86% approval rating for the first season, based on 81 reviews, with an average rating of 7.85/10. The website's consensus reads, "Earnest, fun, and more balanced than its source material, Runaways finds strong footing in an over-saturated genre." Metacritic, which uses a weighted average, assigned a score of 68 out of 100 based on 26 critics, indicating "generally favorable reviews".

Brian K. Vaughan, who created the characters for the comics, "did a little consulting early in the process" but felt the series "found the ideal 'foster parents' in Josh Schwartz and Stephanie Savage... [who] lovingly adapted [the comics] into a stylish drama that feels like contemporary Los Angeles." He also praised the cast, crew and writers working on the series, and felt the pilot looked "like an Adrian Alphona comic", the artist who worked with Vaughan when he created the characters.
