= Shelter Me =

Shelter Me may refer to

- Shelter Me (The Waifs album), 1998, or the title song
- Shelter Me (Richard Page album), 1996, or the title song
- "Shelter Me" (song), a 1990 song by Cinderella
- Shelter Me (film), or Riparo, a 2007 Italian romantic drama film
- "Shelter Me" (Baywatch), a 1989 television episode
- "Shelter Me", a song by Buddy Miller from Universal United House of Prayer, covered by Tab Benoit
- "Shelter Me", a song by Lee Dagger featuring Inaya Day
- "Shelter Me", a song by Joe Cocker from his album Cocker
- "Shelter Me", a song by Train from their album For Me, It's You

== See also ==
- Gimme Shelter (disambiguation)
- Protect Me (disambiguation)
- Cover Me (disambiguation)
