= Pride (comics) =

Marvel Comics supervillain team

Publication information
- Publisher: Marvel Comics
- First appearance: Runaways #1 (July 2003)
- Created by: Brian K. Vaughan; Adrian Alphona

In-story information
- Base(s): Los Angeles; secret lair beneath the La Brea Tar Pits.
- Member(s): Catherine Wilder; Geoffrey Wilder; Leslie Dean; Frank Dean; Janet Stein; Victor Stein; Stacey Yorkes; Dale Yorkes; Tina Minoru; Robert Minoru; Gene Hayes; Alice Hayes

Pride is a supervillain team appearing in American comic books published by Marvel Comics. The characters are depicted as a criminal organization that controlled the Los Angeles area of the Marvel Universe. They are the parents and the initial and most prominent foes the Runaways have faced and are the team's greatest enemy to date. The Pride consists of six married couples who are secretly supervillains. They possess a wide range of abilities, skills, and resources. Each member of The Pride has their own unique powers or expertise, often related to their criminal or mystical backgrounds. The mafia-controlling Wilders, the time-traveling Yorkeses, the telepathic mutant Hayeses, the alien invader Deans, the mad scientist Steins, and the dark wizard Minorus.

Pride was often considered to be an efficient super-villain team that barred other villains from controlling Los Angeles. Although the real world did not know of Pride's existence, Mafia mob bosses who did, such as Kingpin, admitted the group ran Los Angeles with efficiency and vision. The Pride first appeared in Runaways #1, published by Marvel Comics in 2003, and was created by Brian K. Vaughan and Adrian Alphona.

The Pride also appeared in Hulu's television series Runaways set in the Marvel Cinematic Universe, where most of them are presented as caring parents who act out of a desire to protect their children from a greater threat.

== Origin ==
=== Original Pride ===
The original members of the Pride were assembled in 1985 by the Gibborim, three mythical giants who had ruled the world when it had "originally been one, serene utopia". The Gibborim informed the couples that they desired to turn the world into the same peaceful utopia it had been millions of years before, but did not have the strength. The Gibborim required the six couples' help ("a Pride") to wipe out the entire planet, and when they achieved their goal, six of the twelve who served them the best would be able to rule the world with them, while the other six would die with the rest of the human race. The couples agreed, and formed the Pride.

The Gibborim require a sacrifice every year for twenty-five years in order to get their strength. During this time, the Gibborim reward the Pride with wealth and with enhancements to their natural abilities and powers so they could rule over Los Angeles. Every year, the Pride gathers at the Wilder residence to sacrifice a woman to the Gibborim under the guise of a charity fundraiser.

The Hayeses and the Deans conspire to kill off the rest of the Pride. Frank Dean, Gene, Alice Hayes, and Leslie Dean from left to right. (Art by Adrian Alphona)

After Janet Stein becomes pregnant during their third year as a group, the Pride agrees to end its struggle against one another. Instead of half the couples surviving, they would instead have one child, with those children receiving the six places in the coming paradise, allowing the Pride's legacy to go on. Unbeknownst to the rest of the Pride, the Deans and the Hayes had made a deal to murder the rest of the Pride and take the six tickets to paradise for themselves and their daughters, Karolina Dean and Molly Hayes, considering themselves superior to the other four families due to their natural abilities compared to the others' reliance on technology and tools.

Seventeen years after the Steins announce their pregnancy, the Pride's children inadvertently see the Rite of Blood and run away. With assistance of LAPD Lieutenant Flores, their parents frame their children for the murder of the innocent girl who served as their most recent sacrifice. A note left at the Deans' house reveals that one of the Runaways is secretly loyal to the Pride. The mole within the Runaways tips off the Pride about their involvement with Cloak and Dagger and alerts the Pride of their new hideout, forcing the Runaways to escape.

During a ceremony at the Rite of Thunder, Alex obtains Nico's Staff of One, Chase's Fistigons and Gertrude's dinosaur (Old Lace), manipulating his teammates into defeat and revealing himself as the mole. It is revealed he had discovered the Deans' and Hayeses' betrayal.

Alex manipulates the Runaways as a way of taking the six tickets in paradise for himself, his parents, Nico, and her parents. Nico brutally refuses his offer, beating up Alex in the process. Within seconds, the other Runaways retrieve their stolen items from Alex. Molly crushes the container carrying the soul of the latest girl sacrificed, the Gibborim destroy Alex, and the undersea lair in which they offer the soul collapses, killing the members of the Pride.

=== "New Pride" ===
Following Alex Wilder's death, his friends find certain items from Pride in an attempt to bring back Alex, but end up resurrecting a younger version of Alex's father Geoffrey from a time period of one year after joining Pride. Geoffrey then lied to the new Pride acting as the "good guy" and saying that the Runaways killed Alex. Geoffrey murders Gertrude Yorkes as part of a sacrificial ritual, but he is captured and returned to his own time (with his memory erased in the process). The new Pride disbands after the Runaways reveal Geoffrey's true goal. Following Gertrude Yorkes's death, Stretch checks himself into a mental health facility and Hunter joins the Peace Corps to atone for the "blood" on his hands. Lotus is kidnapped by Chase Stein to help him resurrect Gertrude. When the attempt fails, Chase releases Lotus, telling her to burn her copy of the Abstract.

=== Alex Wilder's New Pride ===
Alex Wilder later founds a new incarnation of the Pride, consisting of Black Mariah, Cottonmouth, Cockroach Hamilton, and Gamecock.

== Members ==
=== Original members ===
Despite Pride's allegiance to one another, rifts and alliances had been common amongst the group. The most notable of the alliances was the Hayeses and the Deans, who had plotted to betray the other remaining Pride members because they were human. All members of the Pride are given nicknames by the Gibborim.

==== The Wilder family ====
Geoffrey and Catherine Wilder ("the Thieves") are Alex Wilder's parents. They are crime bosses who posed as businesspeople. They handled illegal drug trade, gambling and robbery in Los Angeles. For this, these two established strong and powerful connections throughout Los Angeles, a reason the Pride is able to frame their kids for kidnap and murder. Geoffrey had led the entire Pride. Geoffrey originally appeared as a stern and demeaning man, who had forbidden his son from playing online roleplaying games. His cool persona is often distinguished, meaning other characters can detect his attitude, as evidenced when Nico is able to identify a 1985 version of Geoffrey. When the Gibborim had called them to the first meeting, Geoffrey and Catherine had been on the run from the cops, after a fresh robbery, where it was revealed that Geoffrey and Catherine had eloped, defying Catherine's mother's wishes.

==== The Yorkes family ====
Dale and Stacey Yorkes ("the Travelers") are Gertrude Yorkes's parents. They are time travellers who posed as antique dealers. The two, using a special 4-D portal, had traveled all over time, and had commissioned a genetically engineered dinosaur, mentally linking it with their daughter. They believed the Gibborim would make a better world, one that wasn't full of superheroes who had foiled their plans in the past (and presumably the future). The Yorkes have a distinct way of speech (unlike the rest of the Pride, they have older-fashioned speech), and often imply they know what will go on in the future. They dress in pilot styles resembling that of Amelia Earhart, complete with the goggles, scarves, and gloves. It was later revealed their outfits were actually technical advances; their gloves cause fire and restraining shields.

==== The Dean family ====
Frank and Leslie Dean ("the Colonists") are Karolina Dean's parents. They are alien invaders from Majesdane who posed as Hollywood actors. In their alien form, they appear humanoid with bright, wispy skin, and can manipulate and control solar energy for a variety of purposes. The two inhibited Karolina's alien powers for most of her life by way of a medical alert bracelet, telling her she had an allergy to penicillin. Frank had included Karolina in his will with a paper instructing her to take off the bracelet, but Karolina had discovered the will early. Frank and Leslie had originally appeared as a happy, smiling couple that complimented Karolina's powers, but as issues went on, it was shown the two would have violent tempers; when the runaways battle their parents over Molly Hayes, Leslie appears rather viciously, returning every time she was knocked out; when Frank arrived from New York and discovered his daughter had already left home and discovered her powers, he had violently attacked Victor Stein roaring for his daughter. The Deans conspired with the Hayeses to kill the rest of the Pride and take the six tickets in paradise for the two couples and their daughters.

When on the run, Karolina meets Xavin, an alien, and more about the Deans is revealed: the Deans had actually been exiled from their planet for criminal activities; the two immigrated to Earth where they took their last name from James Dean. When Prince De'zean of the Skrulls had arrived at Earth to conquer it, Frank and Leslie had stopped him. In exchange, the two gave the Skrulls the coordinates of a much more valuable planet: Majesdane, the Deans' birth planet, which was hidden beneath a white dwarf star. To assure the Skrulls the coordinates were real, the Deans offered the prince their daughter's hand in marriage; therefore, Karolina was engaged to the son of the prince, Xavin. The Skrulls then left to destroy Majesdane, culminating in a fifteen-year war.

==== The Stein family ====
Victor and Janet Stein ("the Wise Men") are Chase Stein's parents. They are world-renowned brilliant inventors who are known for making fortunes for what people believe are necessities. They also made "weaponized" gloves called Fistigons, multi-spectral goggles and the transport ship "the Leapfrog". When the Gibborim had called them for the first meeting, the Steins were in their laboratory. At the back of the Stein home is their workshop, which appears as a small shed. When entered, the space is equal to that of a large cave. The Steins have also created watches that zap electricity, watches that scan police radars and senses, creating the container that carries the soul they sacrifice, and they dress in scientific outfits for their villainous costumes. Janet Stein's pregnancy is the reason the remaining Pride wished to have children, and started the idea of offering their place to a child.

==== The Hayes family ====
Gene and Alice Hayes ("the Outcasts") are Molly Hayes' parents. The two are telepathic mutants who posed as doctors. Gene first appears as a very awkward man, unwilling to talk about his daughter's puberty. Alice is described a strong and caring mother, but still able to offer up her own daughter as a ransom to capture the five other runaways. When the Gibborim had called the Hayes for the first meeting, Gene and Alice had been getting harassed by the neighbors, who had thrown rocks at them for being mutants. Just before a furious Gene was about to protect a whimpering Alice, the two had been called forth by the Gibborim. This led to the Hayeses' strong hatred towards humans, a reason they were willing to conspire with the Deans to kill the human members of the Pride and ensure the six tickets in paradise for themselves, Molly, and the Deans. It was revealed early on that the Hayes had no idea Molly was a mutant herself, Molly having tested negative for the mutant gene, but when Molly manifested mutant abilities, the Hayes were shocked.

==== The Minoru family ====
Robert and Tina Minoru ("the Magicians") are Nico Minoru's parents. The two are dark wizards who posed as an average, church-going, middle-class couple. When the Gibborim had first abducted the Pride for the first meeting, the Minorus were on their wedding day. Arriving in the Gibborim's chamber with the rest of the Pride, the two quickly unleashed a black hole of bats at the Pride. When the Runaways witness the Rite of Blood, they see that Robert conducts the enchanted spell of sacrifice. The Runaways see the Minorus in action when they get ambushed at the Steins' laboratory; Tina conducts her powers using a mystical Staff known as the "Staff of One", and Robert conducts his powers through a spell book. Tina attempted to stab Nico with the Staff, but, due to Nico's magic and hereditary link with Tina, the Staff was absorbed by Nico, who kept it.

The Minorus are considered highly proficient spellcasters of the dark arts, able to evoke spells of various effects with spoken incantations and without, capable of conjuring bats from nowhere, conducting the Rite of Blood, garbing themselves and others in their costumes, summoning the Staff of One and an enchanted tome (the Abstract), summoning waterspouts, killing a genetically engineered prehistoric creature, teleporting a Majesdanian alien back to his home planetoid in another galaxy, freezing another, even a holder of the Staff of One in time, and project energy blasts of sufficient strength to hold off Elder Gods (if but for moments). The Minorus are involved with various other mystical matters such as Dormammu and Agamotto. Nevertheless, for whatever reason (presumably due to the lack of the Staff of One because Nico stole it), the Minorus appeared incapable, despite their immense power and experience in dark magic, of locating the Runaways, though they were but at most several miles from the Pride.

==== Former agents ====
- Lieutenant Flores – A member of the LAPD. Shot in the leg by Catherine Wilder for bringing Cloak and Dagger to L.A. and then killed by Geoffrey Wilder after he failed to capture the children.
- Alex Wilder – He was revealed to be a spy for his parents and the rest of the Pride. Killed by the Gibborim.

=== "New Pride" ===
- Stretch – An overweight boy who lives with his grandmother (had role-played as several female and scantily clad superheroes such has Emma Frost, Ms. Marvel, and Invisible Woman). Armed with a sword made of the same alien metal as Karolina's medical bracelet, he had himself institutionalized after leaving the group.
- Hunter – A thin young man with a stereotypical slacker appearance (had role-played as the Hulk). He was a hacker with enough skill to hack not only the Leapfrog, but Victor's systems. He joined the Peace Corps to atone for his evil deeds.
- Lotus – A female fantasy fan who participates in Renaissance Fairs (had role-played as Daredevil). Given several mystical artifacts, she was the magic user of the group. She chose to return to her everyday life in an attempt to overcome her own personal demons.
- Oscar – A man who often was fired from many jobs because of using the computers for online games (had role-played as Spider-Man).

=== Alex Wilder's New Pride ===
- Alex Wilder – Leader
- Black Mariah
- Cottonmouth
- Dontrell "Cockroach" Hamilton
- Scimitar
- Gamecock

== In other media ==
=== Film ===
Tina Minoru makes a minor appearance in Doctor Strange, portrayed by Linda Louise Duan. This version is a member of the Ancient One's sect.

=== Television ===
The Pride appears in Runaways (2017), with Catherine Wilder portrayed by Angel Parker, Geoffrey Wilder portrayed by Ryan Sands, Leslie Dean portrayed by Annie Wersching, Frank Dean portrayed by Kip Pardue, Janet Stein portrayed by Ever Carradine, Victor Stein portrayed by James Marsters, Stacey Yorkes portrayed by Brigid Brannagh, Dale Yorkes portrayed by Kevin Weisman, Tina Minoru portrayed by Brittany Ishibashi, Robert Minoru portrayed by James Yaegashi, Gene Hernandez portrayed by Vladimir Caamaño and Alice Hernandez portrayed by Carmen Serano. This version of the Pride formed out of necessity as opposed to personal reasons as their benefactor Jonah (played by Julian McMahon) has them blackmailed into helping him, with the sacrifices channeling the life energy of the victims to Jonah rather than the victims being explicitly killed and their souls trapped. Their backgrounds are more grounded in that they do not possess any superpowers with many of their known activities being possible through means of science and are shown to be caring to their kids.

=== Video games ===
The Pride appears in Lego Marvel Super Heroes 2 as part of the "Runaways" DLC.
