= Gimme Shelter (disambiguation) =

"Gimme Shelter" is a song by The Rolling Stones.

Gimme Shelter may also refer to:

- Gimme Shelter (album), by The Rolling Stones
- Gimme Shelter (1970 film), documentary about The Rolling Stones by the Maysles brothers
- Gimme Shelter (2013 film), drama directed by Ron Krauss
- Gimme Shelter (Law & Order), three-part crossover event of Law & Order TV series
- "Gimme Shelter" (Runaways), an episode of Runaways
