= I. Y. Yunioshi =

Fictional character

- Breakfast at Tiffany's character
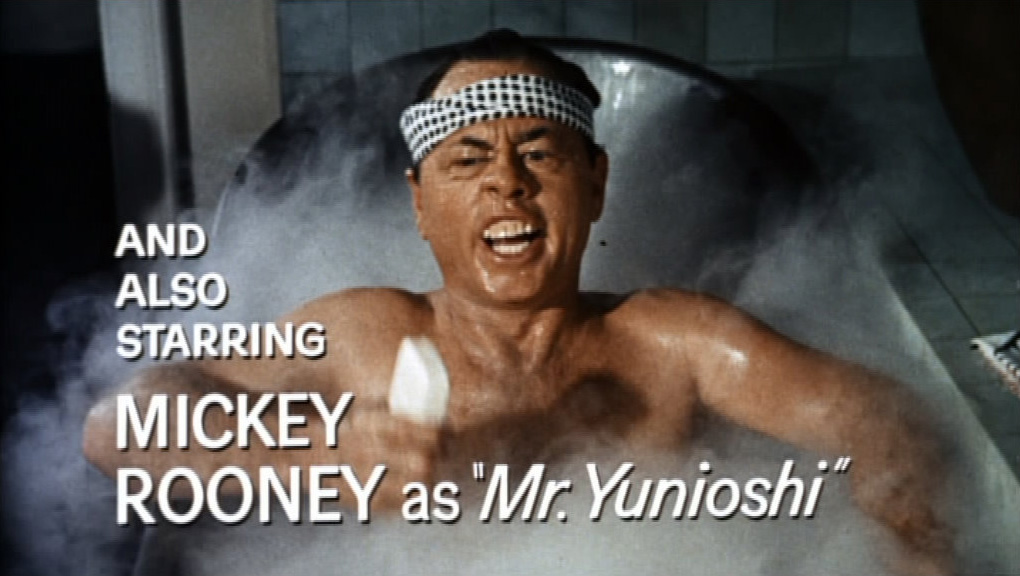
- The introduction of Mickey Rooney's performance of I. Y. Yunioshi in the theatrical trailer for Breakfast at Tiffany's.
- First appearance: Breakfast at Tiffany's (novella) (1958)
- Last appearance: Breakfast at Tiffany's (film) (1961)
- Created by: Truman Capote (novella); Blake Edwards (film)
- Portrayed by: Mickey Rooney (film); James Yaegashi (play)

In-universe information
- Alias: Mr. Yunioshi
- Gender: Male
- Occupation: Landlord
- Origin: Japan
- Nationality: Japanese

I. Y. Yunioshi is a fictional character conceived by Truman Capote for his 1958 novella Breakfast at Tiffany's, which George Axelrod adapted for the 1961 movie of the same name. The character in the film is significantly different from the character as presented in Capote's original novella, and the film version of Mr. Yunioshi, as portrayed by Mickey Rooney, has been the subject of extensive critical commentary and review since its theatrical release due to its use of ethnic stereotypes.

== Critical response ==
=== Upon release ===
In 1961, The New York Times review of the film said that "Mickey Rooney's bucktoothed, myopic Japanese is broadly exotic." Several reviewers of the day took issue with the characterization. James Powers' review in The Hollywood Reporter stated, "Mickey Rooney gives his customary all to the part of a Japanese photographer, but the role is a caricature and will be offensive to many." In Variety, Larry Tubelle wrote simply, "Mickey Rooney's participation as a much-harassed upstairs Japanese photographer adds an unnecessarily incongruous note to the proceedings."

=== Since 1990 ===
In 1990, The Boston Globe described Rooney's portrayal as "an irascible bucktoothed nerd and an offensive ethnic caricature". In 1993, the Los Angeles Daily News wrote that the role "would have been an offensive stereotype even played by an Asian; the casting of Mickey Rooney added insult to injury".

The portrayal was referenced in the 1993 film Dragon: The Bruce Lee Story as an example of Hollywood's racist attitudes about Asians that the American Bruce Lee's success as a film star would challenge. Specifically, when Lee and his girlfriend Linda Emery watch Breakfast at Tiffany's in the theater, despite laughing at the character, Linda suggests they leave midway through the picture after she notices that Bruce is upset at Rooney's stereotypical depiction.

=== Since 2000 ===
More recent characterizations include as an uncomfortable "stereotype", "painful, misguided", "overtly racist" and "Orientalist", "one of the most egregiously horrible 'comic' impersonations of an Asian ... in the history of movies", and a portrayal "border[ing] on offensive" that is a "double blow to the Asian community – not only is he fatuous and uncomplimentary, but he is played by a Caucasian actor in heavy makeup." Similarities between the character of Mr. Yunioshi and anti-Japanese wartime propaganda in the United States have been noticed by critics Jeff Yang and David Kerr.

A free outdoor screening in Sacramento, California, scheduled for August 23, 2008, was replaced with the animated film Ratatouille after protests about the Yunioshi character. The protest was led by Asian American Media Watch.

A screening was shown August 11, 2011 at Brooklyn Bridge Park's "Movies with a View" series in New York. Due to protests from a multi-ethnic group organized by an online petition at Change.org, the screening also included a short statement by the organizers which acknowledged and validated community concerns about Yunioshi and a brief documentary about Rooney's character and the portrayal of Asian Americans in other films that was edited from a DVD extra for the anniversary DVD. The aforementioned editorial in the New York Daily News by columnist Jeff Yang offered an alternative view regarding the protests: "Far from boycotting the movie or even begrudgingly accepting it, I think it should be mandatory viewing for anyone who wants to fully understand who we are as a culture, how far we've come and how far we still need to go."

== Response to criticism from those involved with the film ==
In a 2008 interview about the film, Rooney said that he was shocked to hear that his role as Yunioshi had been branded racist by several Asian-American activists. Rooney said that he was heartbroken about the criticism: "Blake Edwards ... wanted me to do it because he was a comedy director. They hired me to do this overboard, and we had fun doing it. ... Never in all the more than 40 years after we made it—not one complaint. Every place I've gone in the world people say, 'God, you were so funny.' Asians and Chinese come up to me and say, 'Mickey, you were out of this world.'" Rooney also said that if he had known people would be so offended, "I wouldn't have done it. Those that didn't like it, I forgive them and God bless America, God bless the universe, God bless Japanese, Chinese, Indians, all of them and let's have peace."

Director Blake Edwards expressed regret about the choice, stating "Looking back, I wish I had never done it ... and I would give anything to be able to recast it, but it's there, and onward and upward."

The 2009 DVD re-release of the film included what was described as "a brief and necessary featurette on the character of Mr. Yunioshi, offering an Asian perspective on 'yellow face'".

== Other media ==
A 2013 Broadway show based on the film cast Japanese-American actor James Yaegashi as a culturally assimilated Japanese-American Yunioshi born in California, as the character was written in Capote's original book.

== See also ==
- Portrayal of East Asians in American film and theater
