= Cover Me =

Cover Me may refer to:

== Music ==
=== Albums ===
- Cover Me (Nena album), 2007
- Cover Me (compilation album), a 1989 album by various artists covering Bruce Springsteen hits
- Cover Me, 3-track EP by Tom McRae

=== Songs ===
- "Cover Me" (Bruce Springsteen song), by Bruce Springsteen from his 1984 album Born in the U.S.A.
- "Cover Me" (Depeche Mode song), 2017 song from Spirit
- "Cover Me", by Björk from her 1995 album Post
- "Cover Me", by Candlebox from their 1993 eponymous debut album
- "Cover Me", by Michael W. Smith from his 2006 album Stand
- "Cover Me", by Percy Sledge from his 1968 album Take Time to Know Her
- "Cover Me", by Stray Kids from their 2023 Rock-Star

== Film and television ==
- Cover Me Canada, a Canadian music reality show
- Cover Me (film), a 1995 American thriller
- Cover Me (American TV series), American crime comedy-drama series
- Cover Me (Canadian TV series), a Canadian TV series
