= Runaways (TV series) =

2017–2019 Marvel Television series

- Genre: Adventure; Superhero; Teen drama
- Created by: Josh Schwartz; Stephanie Savage
- Based on: Runaways by: Brian K. Vaughan; Adrian Alphona
- Showrunners: Josh Schwartz; Stephanie Savage
- Starring: Rhenzy Feliz; Lyrica Okano; Virginia Gardner; Ariela Barer; Gregg Sulkin; Allegra Acosta; Angel Parker; Ryan Sands; Annie Wersching; Kip Pardue; Ever Carradine; James Marsters; Brigid Brannagh; Kevin Weisman; Brittany Ishibashi; James Yaegashi; Julian McMahon; Clarissa Thibeaux
- Composer: Siddhartha Khosla
- Country of origin: United States
- Original language: English
- No. of seasons: 3
- No. of episodes: 33

Production
- Executive producers: Brett Morgen (1x01 only); Alan Fine; Stan Lee; Joe Quesada; Karim Zreik; Jim Chory; Jeph Loeb; Josh Schwartz; Stephanie Savage; Quinton Peeples
- Producers: Kelly Van Horn; Emma Fleischer; P. Todd Coe
- Cinematography: Ramsey Nickell; David Stockton; John C. Newby; David Perkal; Bradford Lipson; M.G. Wojciechowski
- Editors: Jeff Granzow; Lois Blumenthal; Adrienne McNally; Jesse Ellis; Joseph Mitacek; Karen Castañeda
- Running time: 43–54 minutes
- Production companies: Fake Empire; ABC Signature Studios; Marvel Television

Original release
- Network: Hulu
- Release: November 21, 2017 – December 13, 2019

Related
- Cloak & Dagger; Marvel Cinematic Universe television series

Marvel's Runaways, or simply Runaways, is an American television series created by Josh Schwartz and Stephanie Savage for the streaming service Hulu, based on the Marvel Comics superhero team the Runaways. It is set in the Marvel Cinematic Universe (MCU), sharing continuity with the other television series of the franchise and acknowledging the continuity of the franchise's films. The series is produced by ABC Signature Studios, Marvel Television and Fake Empire, with Schwartz and Savage serving as showrunners.

Rhenzy Feliz, Lyrica Okano, Virginia Gardner, Ariela Barer, Gregg Sulkin, and Allegra Acosta star as the Runaways, six teenagers from different backgrounds who unite against their parents, the Pride, portrayed by Angel Parker, Ryan Sands, Annie Wersching, Kip Pardue, Ever Carradine, James Marsters, Brigid Brannagh, Kevin Weisman, Brittany Ishibashi, and James Yaegashi. Julian McMahon also stars in the second season as Jonah, after recurring in the first, while Clarissa Thibeaux stars in the third season as Xavin, after recurring in the second.

A film from Marvel Studios based on the Runaways began development in May 2008, before being shelved in 2013 due to the success of The Avengers. In August 2016, Marvel Television announced that Runaways had received a pilot order from Hulu, after being developed and written by Schwartz and Savage. Casting for the Runaways and the Pride were revealed in February 2017, and filming of the pilot began in Los Angeles that month. The series was officially ordered by Hulu in May 2017.

The first season was released from November 21, 2017, to January 9, 2018. The show was renewed for a 13-episode second season, which was released in its entirety on December 21, 2018. The third and final season of ten episodes, which included a crossover with fellow Marvel Television young adult series Cloak & Dagger, was released on December 13, 2019. Runaways was removed from Hulu in May 2023 as part of Disney's cost-cutting measures. It was added to the CW's streaming service in 2024 and to Tubi in 2026.

== Premise ==
Six teenagers from different backgrounds unite against a common enemy – their criminal parents, who collectively run an organization called Pride. In the second season, the teenagers are now on the run from their parents, living on their own and figuring out how to stop Pride. The third season sees Nico Minoru and the other members of the team face off against aliens and Morgan le Fay.

== Cast and characters ==
=== Main ===
- Rhenzy Feliz as Alex Wilder: A nerd who longs to reunite with his childhood friends. He has a high intellect and is the leader of the Runaways.
- Lyrica Okano as Nico Minoru:
  A Wiccan who isolates herself with her gothic appearance and is a member of the Runaways. Unlike the comics, Nico does not summon the Staff of One through self-harm. Okano said this was tweaked, "for good reason" as there would be "a lot of young teenagers watching the show and we don't want to promote anything like self-harm because that's serious". She added that an element of drawing blood would still be involved.
- Virginia Gardner as Karolina Dean:
  A human-alien hybrid burdened by her religious upbringing who wants to pursue her own desires instead of following in her mother's footsteps, and is a member of the Runaways. Karolina has the ability of flight, to glow with rainbow-colored light, and to shoot beams of light.
- Ariela Barer as Gertrude Yorkes: A riot grrrl, social activist, and a member of the Runaways. She also has a telepathic link with her genetically engineered dinosaur, Old Lace.
- Gregg Sulkin as Chase Stein:
  A high school lacrosse player who is often dismissed as a dumb jock, but displays brilliance in engineering and is a member of the Runaways. Sulkin and the writers wanted the character to be "more layered" than the comics, and Sulkin felt that Chase was the most changed of the Runaways from the source material. The character is depicted as having the potential to be as much of a genius as his father is, and builds gadgets, including powerful weaponized gauntlets called "Fistigons". Connor Falk portrays a young Chase.
- Allegra Acosta as Molly Hayes Hernandez:
  The youngest member of the Runaways who is characterized by her positive attitude. Molly discovers she has the ability of superhuman strength and invulnerability. Evelyn Angelos portrays a young Molly.
- Angel Parker as Catherine Wilder: Alex's mother, a successful lawyer, and a member of Pride.
- Ryan Sands as Geoffrey Wilder: Alex's father and a self-made business man who had a grueling path to his success and is a member of Pride.
- Annie Wersching as Leslie Dean (née Ellerh):
  Karolina's mother, one of the leaders of the cult-like religious group the Church of Gibborim and a member of the Pride. Mia Topalian portrays a young Leslie Ellerh, while Charlie Townsend portrays her as a toddler.
- Kip Pardue as Frank Dean:
  Karolina's father, a former teen star who is struggling in his professional acting career and becomes one of the leaders of the Church of Gibborim. Unlike the comics, Frank is not currently a member of Pride. Pardue described the character as the "liaison" between the Runaways and Pride, saying, "This whole show is about the kids fighting their parents. Frank toes that line and has to find out where his allegiances lie".
- Ever Carradine as Janet Stein: Chase's mother who has a brilliant mind, is "a perfect PTA mom", and a member of Pride. Sorel Carradine (Ever's cousin) portrays a young Janet.
- James Marsters as Victor Stein:
  Chase's father, an engineering genius and a member of Pride. Marsters was inspired by Vincent D'Onofrio's portrayal of Wilson Fisk in Daredevil, saying it was "exactly opposite of what I was expecting", and also looked for common ground with Victor, saying, "I'm not an abusive parent but I'm not a perfect parent. I don't think anyone is." He added that Victor just wants Chase to live up to his potential. Tim Pocock portrays a young Victor.
- Brigid Brannagh as Stacey Yorkes: Gert's mother, a bioengineer, and a member of Pride.
- Kevin Weisman as Dale Yorkes: Gert's father, a bioengineer, and a member of Pride.
- Brittany Ishibashi as Tina Minoru:
  Nico's mother who is a brilliant innovator, ruthless CEO, and perfectionist "tiger mom" who is a member of Pride. The character previously appeared in the film Doctor Strange, in a minor role as a Master of the Mystic Arts, portrayed by Linda Louise Duan. The producers felt free to recast the role and create a different version of Tina Minoru since Duan was not named as the character in the film.
- James Yaegashi as Robert Minoru: Nico's father and a member of Pride who is a brilliant innovator.
- Julian McMahon as Jonah:
  Karolina's biological father, a member of the alien race known as the Gibborim who is the Pride's benefactor. McMahon described Jonah as "the wealthy guy who's pretty ego-driven and mission-driven... who's trying to accomplish certain things and if something were to get in his way he'd plow through it", which he felt was similar to Victor von Doom, whom he portrayed in Fantastic Four and its sequel. He also revealed that he did not appear in the earlier episodes as the character in his near-death state, as he had been cast after the first four episodes had been completed. Ric Sarabia portrayed the character in this state, which McMahon stated took five hours of make up application to achieve.
- Clarissa Thibeaux as Xavin: A shape-shifting alien who believes in a prophecy that they are betrothed to Karolina.

=== Recurring ===
==== Introduced in season 1 ====
- Danielle Campbell as Eiffel: A popular Atlas Academy student who has a crush on Chase but looks down on Karolina, spreading rumors about her to the school while covering for fellow bullies Brandon and Lucas attempting to rape her. She eventually lets go of her crush on Chase and starts dating Lucas.
- Pat Lentz as Aura: A member of the Church of Gibborim who works for the Deans. Sarah Ann Vail portrays a young Aura.
- Heather Olt as Frances: A member of the Church of Gibborim who works for the Deans. Alexa Marie Anderson portrays a young Frances.
- DeVaughn Nixon as Darius Davis: An old associate of Geoffrey's who holds a grudge against him.
- Cody Mayo as Vaughn Kaye: Leslie Dean's assistant at the Church of Gibborim
- Alex Fernandez as Flores: An LAPD lieutenant who works under the Pride.
- Ozioma Akagha as Tamar Davis: Darius' wife who is pregnant with, and eventually gave birth to, his son, Xerxes.

Old Lace, a genetically engineered Deinonychus telepathically linked with Gert Yorkes, appears in the series. The character is portrayed by a puppet that was operated by six people, including one person pumping air through the puppet to show the dinosaur breathing. Barer called the puppet "incredible ... You see her emotions. We don't not make use of that."

==== Introduced in season 2 ====
- Ajiona Alexus as Livvie: Darius' sister-in-law and Alex's love interest.
- Helen Madelyn Kim as Megan: A millennial employee at Pride who is unknowingly abused by her bosses.
- Myles Bullock as Anthony "AWOL" Wall: Flores' corrupt partner who goes after the Runaways.

==== Introduced in season 3 ====
- Elizabeth Hurley as Morgan le Fay: A powerful sorceress of the Dark Dimension.
- Scarlett Byrne as Bronwyn: A member of Morgan le Fey's coven of witches.

=== Guest ===
==== Introduced in season 1 ====
- Zayne Emory as Brandon: A member of Chase's lacrosse team and best friend of Lucas, with whom he attempts to rape Karolina before Chase physically assaults them to save her, prompting them to plot their revenge.
- Timothy Granaderos as Lucas: A member of Chase's lacrosse team and best friend of Brandon, with whom he attempts to rape Karolina before Chase physically assaults them to save her, prompting them to plot their revenge. He eventually dates fellow bully Eiffel.
- Nicole Wolf as Destiny Gonzalez: A young woman who joins the Church of Gibborim and is sacrificed soon after by the Pride.
- Nathan Davis Jr. as Andre: An associate of Darius' who is used as a sacrifice for the Pride.
- Lee Fraley as David Ellerh: The founder of the Church of Gibborim and Leslie's father. Nathan Sutton portrays a young David.
- Ryan Doom as Alphona: Chase's lacrosse coach.
- Devan Chandler Long as Kincaid: A man hired by Tina Minoru for devious purposes.
- Kimmy Shields as a supporter of Gert's club.
- Anjelika Washington as a supporter of Gert's club.
- Cooper Mothersbaugh as a supporter of Gert's club.
- Amanda Suk as Amy Minoru: Nico's older sister, Alex's best friend and Tina and Robert's daughter who died prior to the beginning of the series. Chandler "ChaCha" Shen portrays a young Amy.
- Vladimir Caamaño as Gene Hernandez: A geologist who is Molly's father and a former member of Pride who died in a fire.
- Carmen Serano as Alice Hernandez: A geologist who is Molly's mother and a former member of Pride who died in a fire.
- Jorge Diaz as Earl: A friendly social activist that Gert befriends.
- Marlene Forte as Graciela Aguirre: A distant cousin of Molly's.

Stan Lee makes a cameo appearance as a limo driver.

==== Introduced in season 2 ====
- Ryan Dorsey as Mike: A homeless biker who causes trouble for the Runaways.
- Jan Luis Castellanos as Topher Vasquez: A mysterious street kid with super strength who briefly joins the Runaways.
- Efrain Figueroa as Joseph Vasquez: Topher's father who was injured by his son.
- Rose Portillo as Eileen Vasquez: Topher's mother who kicked him out of the house.
- Veronica Diaz as Sofia Vasquez: Topher's sister who is a nurse.
- Damien Diaz as Oscar Gonzalez: Destiny's brother who Frank kills in self defense.
- Elayn J. Taylor as Nana B: Darius' mother and Tamar's mother-in-law.
- Brie Carter as Mary: A millennial employee at Pride who is unknowingly abused by her bosses.
- Steve O'Young as Mitch: A member of AWOL's strike team.
- Kathleen Quinlan as Susan Ellerh: A member of the Church of Gibborim and Leslie's mother
- Kara Royster as Wendy: A millennial employee at Pride who takes an interest in Chase.

Introduced this season is Darius and Tamar's infant son Xerxes.

==== Introduced in season 3 ====
- Anjali Bhimani as Mita Nansari: An employee at WIZARD.
- Emily Alabi as Cassandra: A member of Morgan le Fey's coven of witches.
- John Ales as Quinton the Great: A once great magician and the original owner of the Hostel.
- Marilyn Tokuda as Akari Minoru: Tina's mother and Nico's grandmother.
- Minae Noji as Tokiko Minoru: Tina's sister and Nico's aunt.
- Brianna Ishibashi as Judith Minoru: Tina's sister and Nico's aunt.
- Granville Ames as Curtis Stein: Victor's father and Chase's grandfather.
- Elliot Fletcher as Max: An unfortunate WIZARD intern who befriends Gert.
- Martin Martinez as Bodhi: A member of the renovated Church of Gibborim who befriends Molly.
- Claudia Sulewski as Julie: Karolina's girlfriend from an alternate future.
- Olivia Holt as Tandy Bowen / Dagger:
  A teenager with the ability to emit light daggers that can inflict bodily pain, dazzle, and purge addictions from her targets from a distance. Additionally, she can see the greatest hopes of those she touches and even steal them for herself. Holt starred as the character on the show Cloak & Dagger.
- Aubrey Joseph as Ty Johnson / Cloak:
  A teenager with the ability to generate and engulf others in shadow and transport them to the Dark Dimension. In addition, he can see the greatest fears of those he touches as well as teleport over long distances. Joseph starred as the character on Cloak & Dagger.

Introduced this season is Jonah and Leslie's infant daughter Elle.

== Episodes ==
Season	Episodes	Originally released	
Season	Episodes	First released	Last released
1	10	November 21, 2017	January 9, 2018
2	13	December 21, 2018	
3	10	December 13, 2019	

=== Season 1 (2017–18) ===
No. overall	No. in season	Title	Directed by	Written by	Original release date
1	1	"Reunion"	Brett Morgen	Josh Schwartz & Stephanie Savage	November 21, 2017
A girl named Destiny is "rescued" by the Church of Gibborim from two muggers, who were actually trying to save her. Friends Alex Wilder, Nico Minoru, Karolina Dean, Gert Yorkes, Chase Stein, and Molly Hernandez have grown apart since the death of Nico's sister, Amy, two years earlier. Alex uses a meeting for their parents' group the Pride to reach out to the others, but they turn him down. They later change their minds: Karolina removes her Church of Gibborim bracelet at a party, sees her hands glowing, and loses consciousness. Chase rescues her from being raped; because of this, Chase stands Gert up for a study session, and she picks up her adopted sister Molly, who has discovered that she has super strength and that their parents have a creature in the basement; and Nico arrives after failing to contact Amy's spirit in a ritual. The gathering is awkward, but they soon discover a secret passage in the house that leads to their parents sacrificing Destiny in a ritual. Molly's camera flash is seen by the parents.
2	2	"Rewind"	Roxann Dawson	Josh Schwartz & Stephanie Savage	November 21, 2017
Before the ritual, Geoffrey Wilder had confronted an old associate from his time as a criminal, threatening him against interfering with the Pride's construction project. Victor Stein is having issues testing the container used in the ritual; Leslie Dean convinces Destiny not to leave the Church of Gibborim until she reaches the stage of "Ultra", which involves the then-upcoming secret ritual; and her husband Frank, an actor who is not a member of the Pride, loses his agent due to his role as cofounder of the Church. The group are all reluctant to sacrifice someone the same age as their children, but go ahead anyway. When they see the flash, they race to investigate, but are convinced by the children that there was an electrical problem in the house. Geoffrey later finds Molly's hairpin outside the entrance to the secret passage, while Victor realizes that his container malfunctioned and Destiny is still alive inside it. Meanwhile, Frank unsuccessfully attempts to enter Leslie's private study, where a decrepit figure lies in another of Victor's containers.
3	3	"Destiny"	Nina Lopez-Corrado	Kalinda Vazquez	November 21, 2017
Karolina is told that Destiny is officially in London for a Church trip. Nico investigates the Staff of One, but is unable to control its power and calls Alex for help. Chase and Gert use some of Victor's inventions to search for Destiny in the Steins' house, and then discover that the creature in the Yorkeses' house is a dinosaur genetically engineered by Gert's parents. Tina and Robert Minoru attempt to deal with their deteriorating marriage, due to Amy's death, but it ends with Robert continuing a secret affair with Janet Stein, and Tina returning home to find Nico and Alex (who pretend to be romantically and sexually involved to avoid suspicion, but later start to genuinely love each other). Catherine Wilder confronts Molly, but the latter lies; saying she had been sneaking around to steal alcohol for the other children. Catherine promises to tell Molly about her parents, who died in a fire when Molly was young (the Pride members blamed each other for doing this). The Yorkeses plan to move with Gert, Molly, and their dinosaur to a remote ranch in Yucatan now that the Pride is over, but then Destiny's body is found.
4	4	"Fifteen"	Ramsey Nickell	Tamara Becher-Wilkinson	November 28, 2017
The Pride holds an emergency meeting, though the Yorkes are out searching for their missing dinosaur. Victor accepts responsibility for the failed sacrifice; so he and Robert go to find a new one. They attempt to kidnap a homeless man, but they bungle the act and are arrested. Karolina is labeled a slut at school, and Chase is told to apologize to his lacrosse team; who he injured when he stopped them from raping her. He instead quits the team. Karolina reveals to Chase how her body glows without her bracelet. She and Gert also look for proof of their parents' innocence, but with Alex's help, they realize that Leslie has been selecting people from her church to sacrifice for years. This does not include Amy, who appeared to commit suicide, though Nico believes she was murdered by the Pride. She goes to the police, but leaves when she sees Victor and Robert talking with a policeman apparently on their payroll. The Yorkeses find the dinosaur, doing what Gert tells her to do, and are threatened by Tina who knows about Yucatan. Alex is kidnapped.
5	5	"Kingdom"	Jeffrey W. Byrd	Rodney Barnes & Michael Vukadinovich	December 5, 2017
In flashback, Geoffrey makes a deal with the mysterious Jonah to buy up land and has to convince his cellmate Darius to take the blame for shooting someone to get out of prison. In the present, Darius has kidnapped Alex as ransom for Geoffrey to pay one million dollars. Nico gets Karolina, Gert, Molly, and Chase to come to the rescue, using the staff to find Alex. Geoffrey shows up with LAPD officers to take out Darius and his men, Alex shoots Andre, one of Darius' goons, but he gets taken again. Alex's friends show up and use their newfound abilities force Darius to run. Alex makes it back to Geoffrey, who tells him to go home while he preps Andre for a sacrifice. The kids barge into the secret room, only to realize that the Pride has moved the sacrifice somewhere else. Tina reveals that she knows Nico used the staff, but allows her to use it. Victor's time machine shows Los Angeles crumbling in the future. Frank fails to achieve Ultra. The sacrifice succeeds this time, revealing that the man the Pride was reviving is Jonah, who asks Leslie to meet "her".
6	6	"Metamorphosis"	Patrick Norris	Kalinda Vazquez	December 12, 2017
Jonah has all the parents recorded during their first sacrifice so as to keep them in check and to prevent them from leaving the Pride. The Pride hosts their annual gala and the kids use the time to download footage of the previous sacrifices from the Minorus' servers. Gert walks in on an intimate confession between Karolina and Nico, and asks Karolina if she likes her. Karolina ignores her comment and tells her that she would love that since it would allow her to be with Chase. While drunk on the roof, Karolina discovers she can fly and Chase kisses her, which she is placid to. Alex and Nico break into Tina's office to get the footage, causing Nico to become suspicious of him as he knew the password rather easily. During the Pride members' speech, Victor reveals his knowledge of Robert and Janet's tryst and collapses from his brain tumor. Jonah uses his experimental medicine to revive him, making him happily euphoric with his family. Frank appears to know about Leslie and Jonah's secret relationship but keeps this information to himself. Molly, in an effort to learn more about her parents, accidentally lets slip to Catherine about her knowledge of the Pride.
7	7	"Refraction"	Peter Hoar	Quinton Peeples	December 19, 2017
Victor sees a message from Chase from the future telling him not to pick up the fistigons. Frank gets healing gloves from Jonah, causing Leslie to become suspicious. Molly becomes distant from the others and tries joining the cheerleaders, but finds solace with Karolina's friendship with her. Dale and Stacy discover that Jonah's cure makes people hyperactive and euphoric, but gives them a drawn-out hangover. At an open house, Leslie gets Janet to break up with Robert, who agrees due to Victor's changing behavior and has Tina take Robert back. Geoffrey and Catherine tell Dale and Stacy that they must do something about Molly as she knows about the Pride's activities. They tell Molly she is going to be sent away, which angers her. Gert comforts her and convinces her to leave to keep the group safe. Frank discovers that Jonah has been living for a long time and finally confronts Leslie about what she and Jonah have been doing. Nico forces Alex to reveal how he knew Tina's password. Victor suddenly becomes violent again and attacks his son with the fistigons, only to get shot by Janet.
8	8	"Tsunami"	Millicent Shelton	Rodney Barnes & Michael Vukadinovich	December 26, 2017
Victor bleeds out as the Pride members arrive to try and patch him up, though this proves to be ineffective and he slips into a coma. Leslie summons Frank to use his healing gloves, but they fail and Victor dies. Tina contacts Jonah, who instructs them to sacrifice Janet for Victor, causing the Pride to argue. Robert decides to sacrifice himself instead, but Tina destroys the pod; reaffirming her devotion to him. Victor is carried away to be revived later. Karolina decides to tell Frank everything she knows about the Pride, getting him to her side. Alex reveals to an angry Nico that he was aware of Amy's snooping and was told to keep her information secret. Molly ends up living with her relative, Graciela, who gives her a letter containing a key. It leads her to a locker with a VHS tape. Nico finds Amy's things and Alex successfully gets the footage of their parents, but his laptop is destroyed by Chase because Pride is the only way to save his father. In flashback, Amy learns from Alex that her laptop was hacked and confides her findings to Kincaid. Amy tries to run away from home, but is caught by an unseen man.
9	9	"Doomsday"	Jeremy Webb	Jiehae Park & Kendall Rogers	January 2, 2018
Ten years prior, Leslie murders Gene and Alice Hernandez with a bomb while Tina listens on the phone. Molly survives due to strange glowing rocks that she is holding. In the present, Janet covers for Victor's absence to the public as Jonah tasks the remaining Pride members with his current plan; to use Geoffrey's drilling company to dig a hole underneath Los Angeles. Darius monitors the area and voices his suspicions to his wife. Molly returns to the group with the VHS tape, which contains a video from her parents warning her about the Pride's activities. The kids decide to use the school dance as a cover to infiltrate the drilling site. Before leaving, Gert and Chase have sex while Karolina kisses Nico, revealing her feelings for her. Frank reveals everything he knows to Jonah, who relays the fact that the kids know everything to their parents. The kids arrive at the drilling site and manage to stop the drill. The Pride arrive to confront their kids, who have all decided to finally take a stand. The kids reveal their powers and the Pride is shocked.
10	10	"Hostile"	Marc Jobst	Quinton Peeples	January 9, 2018
Karolina is kidnapped by Jonah while the rest of the Runaways hide. They make it to the woods outside L.A. and Gert lets her dinosaur, now named Old Lace, go. Finding new disguises, Chase and Molly sneak into the Church of Gibborim to rescue Karolina while Alex waits outside and overhears his parents announcing their intent to find him themselves. Leslie and the Yorkeses discover that Jonah is digging for something "alive". Leslie reveals that she was indirectly responsible for Amy's death and that she is unsure of Frank's loyalty. She manages to convince the Yorkeses, the Minorus, and Janet to join her in killing Jonah. Alex makes a deal with Darius; telling him everything about the Pride. In return, Darius gives Alex hundreds of dollars and a gun. Jonah plans his next move with Frank over Victor's body and notices that he needs another sacrifice. The Runaways make it to a bus stop and are reunited with Old Lace, but are forced to run upon seeing that they have been framed for Destiny's murder.

=== Season 2 (2018) ===
No. overall	No. in season	Title	Directed by	Written by	Original release date
11	1	"Gimme Shelter"	Allison Liddi-Brown	Josh Schwartz & Stephanie Savage	December 21, 2018
While the Pride continues to search for their children, Chase's fistigons and Alex's money are stolen by a homeless biker named Mike on a Bike. Alex, who won't explain where he got the money, goes off to get more from Darius, who has him paint his unborn son's bedroom. He also meets Livvie, Darius' sister-in-law, who finds him attractive. The Yorkeses learn about the Hernandezes' VHS tape and go to Graciela to get it. When she reacts violently, Tina kills her and makes it look like she died of natural causes. The Runaways find her body and hold a memorial for her at a homeless gathering. Jonah tells an unconscious Victor that they need to help each other get better. The rest of the Pride decide they need to act against Jonah, so Tina takes command with Geoffrey as her "co-captain". The Runaways find Mike on a Bike and get their stuff back; discovering a hidden hostel in the mountains which they call home in the process. Karolina meets with Jonah privately to discuss their relationship when they feel a violent earthquake.
12	2	"Radio On"	Chris Fisher	Warren Hsu Leonard	December 21, 2018
Jonah teaches Karolina how to use her powers without her bracelet. Alex finally tells the other Runaways that he is working with Darius, much to their chagrin. Jonah seeks Janet's help with Victor's work. Afterwards, she takes a book from Jonah that she must translate and tells Geoffrey about what she is up to. Karolina, Nico, and Molly break into the Minorus' house to steal the Staff of One and wind up fighting Tina. After some coaxing, Tina relents, but tells Nico that they're no longer family. Nico realizes that Karolina doesn't need her bracelet and accuses her of holding back. Chase and Gert further their relationship and try to bring power back to the hostel. They blow a fuse and together use Old Lace to scare away power workers and steal some of their equipment. Alex returns to help Darius and gets closer to Livvie, who doesn't believe the news about him. Molly sneaks out of the hostel just as the Wilders decide to frame someone else for Destiny's murder to bring their kids out. Darius calls Geoffrey to tell him that he knows where Alex is.
13	3	"Double Zeros"	Larry Teng	Kirk A. Moore	December 21, 2018
The Runaways attempt to use their new abilities without Alex, who is still conversing with Darius and his family. Gert is still antsy without her medication, which concerns Chase. Molly continues to sneak out and use her powers to "fight crime", with Nico reprimanding her, though she does not tell Gert. Leslie is upset with Frank for taking over the church, but he tells her that he is just playing along with Jonah. Jonah sends Janet into Victor's mind because Victor doesn't want to cooperate, and she has him help her decode Jonah's language. Darius finally sells out Alex to Geoffrey, who in turn tries to make amends with him by giving him a hotel key card. Alex secretly sends help to the Runaways, who come and save him. Darius arrives at the hotel and sees Catherine, who has been waiting to kill him and frame him for Destiny's murder, clearing the Runaways. Alex re-situates himself with his friends while Gert discovers Molly's midnight runs. She is followed back to the hostel by another teenager named Topher, who introduces himself to them.
14	4	"Old School"	Patrick Norris	Tracy McMillan	December 21, 2018
Everyone, except Molly, does not trust Topher despite his friendly demeanor. Nico notices him applying a strange substance to his wrist that he uses to show his strength, but keeps it to herself. In the morning, Topher bonds with Molly over a possible relationship. Geoffrey chastises Catherine for betraying Darius. Karolina once again sneaks off to meet with Jonah under the guise of looking for employment. Alex realizes that they need to get a computer drive from Atlas Academy, so the group plus Topher go there to look. While Topher is inside, the Yorkeses trigger an earthquake at the drilling site, causing the students to exit the school. Gert sneaks in, but is caught by the nurse, alerting the parents who come looking for their kids. The Runaways get the computer drive and escape. Jonah and Karolina head to the drilling site and spot the Yorkeses leaving. Nico snags Topher's substance from him and demands to know what it is. A sickly Jonah takes a curious Karolina down the drilling hole for answers.
15	5	"Rock Bottom"	Scott Peters	Jake Fogelnest	December 21, 2018
Topher claims that he was kicked out by his parents and that he found unique rocks in a terrarium in an alley way. Though they're still doubtful, the group let him stay and Molly tells him about the dig site. Karolina and Jonah get to the bottom, where Karolina learns of her alien roots and extended family. Topher suddenly takes off in the morning and the Runaways give chase upon learning of his plan. Leslie and Frank reconnect over Jonah's lies, with the latter angered upon learning of him being with Karolina. Robert tries to intimidate Jonah about the whereabouts of their children, but he is overpowered by members of the church and brought back to the rest of the Pride. The Runaways find Topher at his parents' house and learn that he lied about his past. He witnessed the Hernandezes' deaths and became addicted to their rocks. A fight breaks out, resulting in Topher being wounded. Molly makes up with the Runaways. Karolina sneaks out to talk to Leslie about Jonah, while Gert sneaks out to a hospital to get anxiety medication.
16	6	"Bury Another"	Ami Canaan Mann	Ashley Wigfield	December 21, 2018
Jonah confronts the Pride; bluntly telling them he plans to have his ship unearthed so he can go home without any trouble, and that he will leave some of his technology for them to use for humanity. The Pride still has trouble believing him, as his ship could potentially cause more earthquakes. Leslie tells Karolina that Jonah should not be trusted and that he is the one who murdered Amy. Gert has Janet sign for her at the hospital. Chase comes to pick her up and has a bittersweet reunion with Janet, who tells them that Jonah plans to make another sacrifice. Desperate, Jonah kidnaps Geoffrey to use so that he can retain his body longer. Janet tells the Yorkeses that Gert and Chase are okay while Leslie and Frank stand up to Jonah about his actions. The Runaways break into the Church of Gibborim, find Geoffrey, and "rescue" him. Janet frees Victor from his stasis after she realizes that he has been fine for a while. Karolina tells Nico about Amy's murder, leaving her shattered. Alex has Geoffrey tied up and tells him that he will answer to him now.
17	7	"Last Rites"	James Madigan	Quinton Peeples	December 21, 2018
Twenty years ago, Jonah watches David Eller die as he takes Leslie under his wing. In the present, Karolina tells the Runaways she has been seeing Jonah and that he just wants him and his family to leave. The Runaways are upset at this news, but they have her stall Jonah through texts while they organize a rescue mission for Karolina's family. Victor sees Chase's message from the future and is moved. The Steins and the Yorkeses prepare to defeat Jonah and destroy his ship. The Runaways and Geoffrey distract Jonah's church army by hacking their vans and then sneak into the construction site. Frank is confronted by Destiny's brother Oscar, and accidentally kills him. The Runaways fail to rescue Karolina's family as everyone arrives. The Pride blow up the ship. Jonah is furious, but he is killed by a vengeful Nico. As he dies, he suddenly speaks with an Australian accent and cannot recognize anyone. Nico puts the Pride to sleep as she and the Runaways escape. Karolina is disheartened by Nico's decision to kill Jonah.
18	8	"Past Life"	Anna Mastro	Kendall Rogers	December 21, 2018
Decades ago, the entity that would eventually become Jonah took possession of a Melbourne doctor after his previous host dies and helps establish the Church of Gibborim. In the present, the Pride is glad to be rid of Jonah, so they can now focus on their children. Gert plans to attend college. Chase later finds out and becomes upset. Karolina refuses to talk to Nico and heads to the church to find anything about Jonah. She finds a recording device from him and learns of her history. Livvie tries to clear Darius' name, but Catherine orders Flores' partner AWOL to attack her and her family as a warning. She teams up with Alex and the Runaways to prove Darius innocent and discover Catherine's involvement. Frank tells Leslie of Oscar's murder, and the latter calls Flores to cover up the crime. Frank then tells the church followers that Leslie is the murderer. Geoffrey goes to Tamar to help her and she promises to get back at him. The Runaways escape the hostel they were staying at, but Molly stays behind to help the others escape.
19	9	"Big Shot"	Wendey Stanzler	Kirk A. Moore	December 21, 2018
Molly holds her own against Flores as the Runaways come and retrieve her. Flores tells the Pride that their kids plan to get back at them and they respond by creating "weapons" to deal with them, though some of the parents are against it. Tina begins acting strange by being flirtatious with Robert while Stacey starts being secretive with Dale. Alex devises a plan to get to AWOL, but it does not go as planned. AWOL angrily confronts Flores about the kids having abilities, but he tells him to stay in line. The Wilders tell Tamar that they will protect her, but she is secretly working with AWOL to get back at them. AWOL makes a deal with Alex to get at their parents and keep him off, which angers Livvie. She informs the rest of the Runaways and they berate him for it. AWOL becomes the Pride's main agent and he kills Flores. Karolina begins hearing a strange voice, but she cannot determine where it came from. Old Lace gets sprayed with a pathogen that makes her and Gert sick and bedridden. AWOL turns on everyone and kidnaps Livvie to find the Runaways.
20	10	"Hostile Takeover"	Jeffrey W. Byrd	Ashley Wigfield	December 21, 2018
AWOL and his men arrive with Livvie at the hostel, but Nico puts up a camouflage spell to hide them. They attempt to negotiate, but AWOL becomes more and more desperate. Gert and Old Lace continue to get sick, so Chase flees with them to get help. The Runaways trick AWOL into entering and hold him hostage. As the rest of his men come in, Nico falls unconscious, then suddenly arises and uses a new power to make them all disappear. Livvie realizes that she cannot stay and that she must protect Tamar. Chase gets Gert and Old Lace to the Yorkeses and Stacey is revealed to have made them sick to get them home, angering Dale. Victor begins displaying strange behavior when he does not remember having sex with Janet and Tina continues to act in a flirtatious manner. When Victor and Tina meet, they seem to be different people. Leslie tries to convince Frank that the church is a lie and that they must leave it behind, but Frank and the church members put her through reconditioning. Victor leaves strange alien messages across the city.
21	11	"Last Waltz"	Ramsey Nickell	Tracy McMillan	December 21, 2018
The Yorkeses attempt to interrogate Chase about where the other kids are, but they are interrupted by Tina, who they are forced to lock up as well. The rest of the Runaways deduce where Chase and Gert are and rescue them, but Old Lace is left behind and tranquilized. The Yorkeses decide to use Old Lace so that they can continue to track Gert. Leslie is taken by Frank and the church to the Crater for reconditioning and discovers her mother, Susan, who reveals that she knows she is hiding another unexpected pregnancy. Nico buries her Staff of One as she feels that it is too dangerous to use. Molly reveals that her birthday was the day before, so the Runaways decide to throw her a Quinceañera. While shopping, Karolina meets a strange woman named Xavin, who mysteriously disappears. Victor uses a special signal to contact Chase, and tells him that he is not getting better as previously believed. The Runaways have the Quinceañera, but Chase reveals afterwards that he is going back to his parents, angering and upsetting everyone.
22	12	"Earth Angel"	Stephen Surjik	Warren Hsu Leonard	December 21, 2018
Church member Vaughn contacts Karolina, who recruits Nico and Molly, and the four head to the crater to rescue Leslie. Karolina receives help from Susan and together they convince the churchgoers that Frank is corrupt. The kids and Leslie leave, while Susan takes control of the crater and locks up Frank. Victor reveals his illness, which is similar to Jonah's, to Chase and has him intern at the Pride. Chase becomes suspicious after overhearing two other employees who were used as guinea pigs in a Pride experiment earlier, so he does some digging. Alex gets a gun with his fingerprints from Tamar so that he can get at his parents while Gert realizes that she is still connected to Old Lace. Victor finally shows Chase the actual Pride headquarters and finally convinces him to join, on the condition that they do not harm his friends. The girls bring Leslie back to the hostel, which Gert approves of, but Alex is concerned. As Karolina rests in her room, she is visited by Xavin, a shape shifting alien, who tells her that she is her betrothed.
23	13	"Split Up"	Jeremy Webb	Quinton Peeples	December 21, 2018
Xavin explains that she was promised Karolina as part of a prophecy. While speaking with Leslie, Xavin reveals that Leslie is pregnant with Jonah's heir and that his family has inhabited other bodies and they'll come for her and Karolina. Chase meets with the Runaways and tells them that their parents will come for them with weapons. A chase ensues and the Runaways split up. Nico confronts her parents and fights them, resulting in shattered glass getting embedded in Robert's neck. Alex is pursued by his parents, but he tricks them into getting caught by the cops and has them arrested. Karolina, Janet, and Chase realize that Victor is actually Jonah and are all captured. Molly outruns Dale while Stacey, once again acting out of character, captures Gert. Dale decides to flee with Gert and Old Lace. Alex, Molly, Nico, Leslie, and Xavin try to plan while Victor, Stacey, and Tina (who are all possessed) wonder where their missing member is and decide to use Karolina, Chase, and Janet to prolong their lives.

=== Season 3 (2019) ===
No. overall	No. in season	Title	Directed by	Written by	Original release date
24	1	"Smoke and Mirrors"	Larry Teng	Tracy McMillan	December 13, 2019
Jonah's family place Chase, Karolina, and Janet in stasis to live out their greatest desires, though Janet eventually realizes that she is in the algorithm and tries to escape. Gert, finally fed up with Dale trying to protect her, convinces him to let her go. In turn, he teaches her how to control Old Lace more effectively. Nico has a vision of Morgan le Fay before Xavin informs her, Molly, Alex, and Leslie that Jonah and his family have possessed Victor, Stacey, Tina, and an unknown fourth individual. Catherine takes the blame for Darius' death so Geoffrey can go free. Xavin poses as Gert to distract Jonah and his family while Alex and Nico sneak into their home to find the captured Runaways. Once they find them, they're able to communicate with them in the algorithm, but can't get them out. Molly manages to get to Stacey long enough for her to flee. Victor and Tina return just in time for Alex and Nico to hide, but notice that something is off. Leslie begins to have labor pains. When she heads to the hospital to have an ultrasound, she discovers that her baby is part alien.
25	2	"The Great Escape"	Philip John	Warren Hsu Leonard	December 13, 2019
Janet and Chase discover that they can manipulate the algorithm based on their desires. Karolina is forced to watch an ailing Nico as Jonah gives her an ultimatum. As Gert prepares to leave with Old Lace, Stacey arrives to warn her and Dale about Jonah, but converts back, forcing Gert to knock her out as she and Dale flee separately. Alex and Nico learn they must retrieve the Abstract from Jonah, which they do so successfully. However, Jonah finds Nico's staff and breaks it. Tina convinces the scientists at WIZARD to develop a new vehicle for space travel while Molly and Xavin steal some alien-detecting inhibitors from her. Janet and Chase manage to seep into each other's algorithm and reunite with Karolina. They find the door, but need to wait for Alex, who is trying to unlock the algorithm while Nico fights Jonah. Molly arrives and knocks him out as Xavin, Gert, and Old Lace reunite with the group. Chase and Karolina escape, but Janet chooses to stay to let them escape, becoming part of the algorithm. As the Runaways reunite at the hostel, Nico believes she is one of the aliens.
26	3	"Lord of Lies"	Allison Liddi-Brown	Kirk A. Moore	December 13, 2019
Xavin wants to kill Nico, but the others prevent her, as they believe she is jealous of her relationship with Karolina. Nico decides to finally destroy her staff, but gets another vision from Morgan. Catherine tells Geoffrey to contact Alex by getting his number from Tamar, who is still mad at him. Once he gets it, Geoffrey asks Alex to see his mother while the rest of the Runaways go to Nico's house to get the inhibitors to determine which of them is Jonah's son, only to later learn that they are all clear. Nico sees a photo of Tina with Morgan and visits Robert, who does not know who Morgan is. This turns out to be an illusion as the real Robert is in the hospital. Leslie meets with her mother for protection but only gets advice. Jonah and his family continue to build their new ship, though it requires all four of them to power it. Catherine is killed by fellow inmates hired by Tamar. Just as Alex learns of his mother's death, he is revealed to be the son and takes Leslie to bargain with Jonah to stay on Earth while the Runaways watch from their hidden cameras.
27	4	"Rite of Thunder"	Jeremy Webb	Russ Cochrane	December 13, 2019
Leslie begins to go into labor. Instead of going to the hospital, Alex takes her to Tamar's house. Leslie secretly tells her that she is aware that something is wrong with Alex and tries contacting Karolina. Chase uses the inhibitor technology to place a coating over weapons they plan to use against Jonah and his family. He and Gert stay at the hostel while the rest of the Runaways head to Tamar's. Alex flees from Karolina and Nico while Molly and Xavin help Leslie give birth to a daughter she names Elle. They find the Abstract and head back while Xavin stays with Leslie. She learns that her prophecy meant that she was to raise Elle as her own, but Alex returns and kidnaps Elle. The Runaways face off against Jonah and his family, managing to retrieve Elle before Xavin uses the transport device to send the two of them into space. Jonah and his family attack the Runaways, but Nico summons the Staff of One and makes them all disappear, though she assures the others they are not dead. Morgan arrives at the hospital to awaken Robert so he can serve her.
28	5	"Enter the Dreamland"	Rob Hardy	Quinton Peeples	December 13, 2019
The Runaways wake up in a refurbished Hostel and meet Quinton the Great, who reveals that they are in "the thin place", which preys on their fears as they all end up in different scenarios. Karolina meets Destiny and the other sacrificed teens, who use her as bait to quell a monstrous version of Nico, though she manages to escape when she realizes that Jonah's death should have been her burden. Nico is guided by Amy to save Tina from reliving Amy's death, who identifies their surroundings as the Dark Dimension. Molly witnesses her parents happily poisoning Church of Gibborim members and escapes. Chase rescues Victor from his abusive father while Gert convinces Stacey to trust her by allowing her to feed Old Lace. Amy reveals that she is Morgan's pawn before Tina and Nico open a portal back to the real world, though the Runaways are forced to leave a still missing Alex behind. As they leave, Amy is revealed to be Quinton in disguise. The group soon learn that they have been gone for six months.
29	6	"Merry Meet Again"	Vanessa Parise	Ashley Wigfield	December 13, 2019
WIZARD releases a new free phone called Corvus, which seems to have a violent effect on people when it breaks. Gert befriends a WIZARD intern named Max, whom Chase quickly becomes jealous of. Karolina learns that Leslie has reformed the Church of Gibborim while Molly decides to volunteer at the Church. She finds Dale working there, but he wants to distance himself from everyone. Victor and Stacey try to recollect themselves and learn of Janet's fate. Nico meets with Tina, who tells her to stay away from Morgan. She later finds out that Robert has recovered and is dating Morgan. Geoffrey has repaired his relationship with Tamar and the two are working on a project with WIZARD. Chase, Gert, Nico, and Karolina attend a WIZARD party, where Robert introduces Morgan as the new CEO, much to Tina's anger. Gert and Chase decide to take a break while Nico takes up Morgan's offer to train under her to save Alex and breaks up with Karolina. Gert, Chase, and Karolina head back to the Hostel, where they find Molly trapped in a trance by the Corvus phone.
30	7	"Left-Hand Path"	Katie Eastridge	Tracy McMillan & Kendall Rogers	December 13, 2019
Karolina destroys the phone and saves Molly, who is horrified to learn that she almost hurt her friends. They make a video warning people about the phones at the church, but Morgan immediately removes it. Still upset with Leslie, Molly confides in Bodhi, a volunteer, by revealing her powers to him, unaware he's working for Morgan. Nico learns that Tina is in a psychiatric hospital and breaks her out. They return to Morgan's hotel to retrieve her grimoire, the Darkhold. Tina frees Robert from Morgan's spell so he can help find them. He successfully locates the Darkhold, uses his glasses to record the necessary pages, and hands them off to Nico before Morgan catches him and kills him. Victor and Stacey learn about the phones, but Geoffrey captures them. Karolina, Chase, and Gert run into Dale while trying to look for Molly, but Morgan's coven arrives and captures them as well. Nico returns to the Hostel to return to the Dark Dimension, only to be interrupted by Ty Johnson and Tandy Bowen's arrival.
31	8	"Devil's Torture Chamber"	Jeff Woolnough	Warren Hsu Leonard & Stu Selonick	December 13, 2019
Ty and Tandy take Nico to rescue her friends, but drop the parents off at the Hollywood sign. The group returns to the Dark Dimension to locate Alex, only to end up in a decimated Los Angeles. Alex is trapped in a prison to be tortured by Darius into committing murder, but he refuses at Catherine's behest. The group run into Quinton, who guides them to the prison, but he is killed immediately afterwards by the local gangs. As they navigate their way through the prison, Ty learns that Gert still cares for Chase and fears losing him along with Molly and Old Lace while Tandy learns of Nico's continued devotion to Karolina. They soon face a possessed Quinton and several gunmen. Once Alex sees them in trouble, he gives in and kills Catherine, freeing himself and his friends. As they escape the Dark Dimension, Tandy sees that Alex wants his friends' powers, but he claims it was the dimension's doing. As Tandy and Ty leave, Molly is revealed to be in the company of Morgan's coven, who induct her into their group.
32	9	"The Broken Circle"	Geeta V. Patel	Russ Cochrane & Kirk A. Moore	December 13, 2019
Geoffrey spots Molly being used by Morgan and overcomes her control. He contacts the remaining Pride members to come aid him in rescuing her. While they successfully manage to do so, Tina learns that Morgan plans to combine the Dark Dimension with Earth. The Pride takes Molly back to the Hostel, where everyone learns that Morgan also plans on using her new phone service to subjugate everyone into her new army for a global takeover. Chase and Gert make up with one another while Dale uses Karolina's blood to make everyone immune to Morgan's phones. Stacey and Leslie tend to Geoffrey, who was injured during the rescue, while he has a tense conversation with Alex. Morgan arrives to force Nico to join her and tries to have the Runaways submit. However, Janet manages to knock out the Los Angeles phone service, ruining Morgan's plans. A fight breaks out, with Gert drawing a salt circle around her and Tina using her magic to finally banish Morgan back to the Dark Dimension. However, Gert is critically wounded during the fight and dies in Chase's arms, causing Old Lace to break free from the closet and roar upon discovering Gert dead.
33	10	"Cheat the Gallows"	Ramsey Nickell	Quinton Peeples	December 13, 2019
Three years after defeating Morgan and losing Gert, Molly is on her way to graduating from Atlas, Karolina has entered a relationship with a girl named Julie, Nico has traveled abroad and mastered her magic, Alex and his family have founded Wilder Innovators, and Chase has holed himself up while trying to perfect time travel. An evil Alex from 2028 arrives to kill his friends in the past, but his version of Chase arrives to stop him. Future Chase gathers everyone, minus his past self, and travels to the day before they discovered their parents' basement and infiltrate their school to find Future Alex. They manage to capture him, with present Alex taking him back to his time so Nico can put him in prison while everyone else travels back to the fight with Morgan to rescue Gert. They successfully do so, though Future Chase is killed. All of the future Runaways disappear, hopeful for a better future. As the gang get ready for breakfast, Alex finds a note from the future mentioning Mancha, as well as telling him to kill Nico, which he pockets and joins his friends.

== Production ==
=== Background ===
Brian K. Vaughan was hired to write a screenplay for Marvel Studios in May 2008, based on his comic book Runaways. Marvel Studios president Kevin Feige and producer Jodi Hildebrand envisioned the film as a coming-of-age story in the style of director John Hughes. In April 2010, Marvel hired Peter Sollett to direct the film, and a month later Drew Pearce signed on to write a new script. The film was developed under the working title Small Faces, referencing the 1960s rock band Small Faces. Development on the film was put on hold in October 2010, with Vaughan later noting Marvel Studios had decided to focus their efforts on a Guardians of the Galaxy film (2014) instead. Pearce explained in September 2013 that the Runaways film had been shelved due to the success of The Avengers (2012); the earliest the film could be made was for Phase Three of the Marvel Cinematic Universe. In October 2014, after announcing Marvel's Phase Three films without Runaways, Feige said the project was "still an awesome script that exists in our script vault ... In our television and future film discussions, it's always one that we talk about, because we have a solid draft there. [But] we can't make them all."

=== Development ===
Marvel Television, based at ABC Studios, was waiting for the right showrunner before moving forward with a television take on the characters. Josh Schwartz and Stephanie Savage, whose company Fake Empire had an overall deal with ABC, independently brought up the property during a general meeting with the studio, and, by August 2016, the pair had spent a year conversing with Marvel about turning Runaways into a television series. That month, it was announced that streaming service Hulu had ordered a pilot episode and scripts for a full season of Runaways, to be co-produced by Marvel Television, ABC Signature Studios, and Fake Empire. Hulu was believed to already have "an eye toward a full-season greenlight". Executive producer Jeph Loeb felt "it was an easy decision" to have Hulu air the series over the other networks Marvel Television works with, because "[w]e were very excited about the possibility of joining a network that was young and growing in the same way that when we went to Netflix when it was young and growing on the original side. It really feels like we're in the right place at the right time with the right show." Loeb and Marvel Television were also impressed by the success of Hulu's The Handmaid's Tale, which helped further justify the decision. Schwartz and Savage wrote the pilot, and serve as showrunners on the series, as well as executive producers alongside Loeb and Jim Chory. In May 2017, Runaways received a 10-episode series order from Hulu at their annual advertising upfront presentation.

Fake Empire's Lis Rowinski produces the series, and Vaughan serves as an executive consultant. On this, Vaughan noted he "did a little consulting early in the process", but felt the series "found the ideal 'foster parents' in Josh Schwartz and Stephanie Savage ... [who] lovingly adapted [the comics] into a stylish drama that feels like contemporary Los Angeles". He also praised the cast, crew and writers working on the series, and felt the pilot looked "like an Adrian Alphona comic", referring to the artist who worked with Vaughan when he created the characters. Loeb said that it had been Schwartz and Savage who had asked that Vaughan be involved, and said that this was something that "a lot of showrunners don't immediately gravitate towards". In discussions with Vaughan, Marvel found that he "really wanted to be involved and make sure that it was done, not just properly, but in a way that it would last 100 episodes". Vaughan also believed Runaways was "much more at home on television" than if it had been adapted to a feature film as originally developed. He was supportive of the various changes Schwartz and Savage made, such as altering Molly Hayes to become Molly Hernandez and being a slightly older age as well as introducing a sister for Nico Minoru who had died, stating the comic material, originally written in 2003, needed to evolve for the series.

On January 8, 2018, Hulu renewed the series for a 13-episode second season. On March 24, 2019, Hulu renewed the series for a ten-episode third season. That November, it was announced that the third season would be the series's last.

=== Writing ===
Schwartz was a fan of the Runaways comic for some time, and introduced it to Savage, saying, "When you're a teenager, everything feels like life and death, and the stakes in this story—really felt like that." Loeb described the series as The O.C. of the Marvel Cinematic Universe (MCU), which Schwartz said meant "treating the problems of teenagers as if they are adults" and having the series "feel true and authentic to the teenage experience, even in this heightened context". Loeb noted that it would deal with modern political issues by saying, "This is a time when figures of authority are in question, and this is a story where teenagers are at that age where they see their parents as fallible and human. Just because someone is in charge, doesn't mean that they're here to do good." The producers did note that the series would explore the parents' perspective as well, with the pilot telling the story from the Runaways' perspective, and the second episode showing the same story from their parents'—the Pride's—perspective, with the two stories converging midway through the first season.

Schwartz likened the tone of Runaways to that of the comics it was based on, calling it "so distinct", saying much of the tone Vaughn used when writing the comics overlapped with the tones Schwartz and Savage like to work in. The pair were excited by the freedom given to them by Hulu over the usual broadcasters they were used to working with, such as allowing the children to swear in the show, not having set lengths for each episode, and being able to explore the parents' story; Hulu wanted "something that felt broad and where we could push the envelope in places". Schwartz described the series as a coming-of-age story and a family drama, with focus on the characters that can lead to long stretches of the series not featuring super powers, so "if you didn't see the show title, you wouldn't know that you were in a Marvel show for long stretches ... That was our aesthetic starting place, but there are episodes where there's some good [Marvel] stuff."

Speaking to the second season, Schwartz felt the series would "accelerate" since the season would be following the kids on the run, saying, "Our focus shifts to these kids and trying to survive in the streets... there's a greater sense of tension and momentum in keeping with where we are in this part of the story." He added that the kids' experience on the run would force them to grow up and make them confront and deal with adult themes quickly. He added that the relationship between Nico and Karolina that began at the end of the first season would be "the emotional core" of the second. As for the parents in the season, Schwartz described them as racing against the clock "to find their kids before something catastrophic potentially could occur". Since the kids know about their powers, they are utilized more in the season. Additionally, the hostel the kids move into is a dilapidated mansion under Griffith Park.

With the third season being the final one of the series, "the story [was] said to come to a natural ending point". When crafting the season, Schwartz and Savage were unsure if the season would be the last for the series, so they "wanted to ensure that the finale was as satisfying as possible" and crafted it as if it was a series finale, while "hav[ing] the potential for another story out there whether it's something that we get to see onscreen or something that lives on in the imagination of the audience." The final moments of the episode see Alex find a note from his future self, telling him to hide "Mancha" and to kill Nico; in the comics, Victor Mancha was the son of Ultron who would join the Runaways to become a hero, and Alex betrays his friends. Time travel elements are also featured in the final episode, something teased in the previous seasons, which Savage said was "in the DNA of the comics so it was something that we wanted to honor".

=== Casting ===
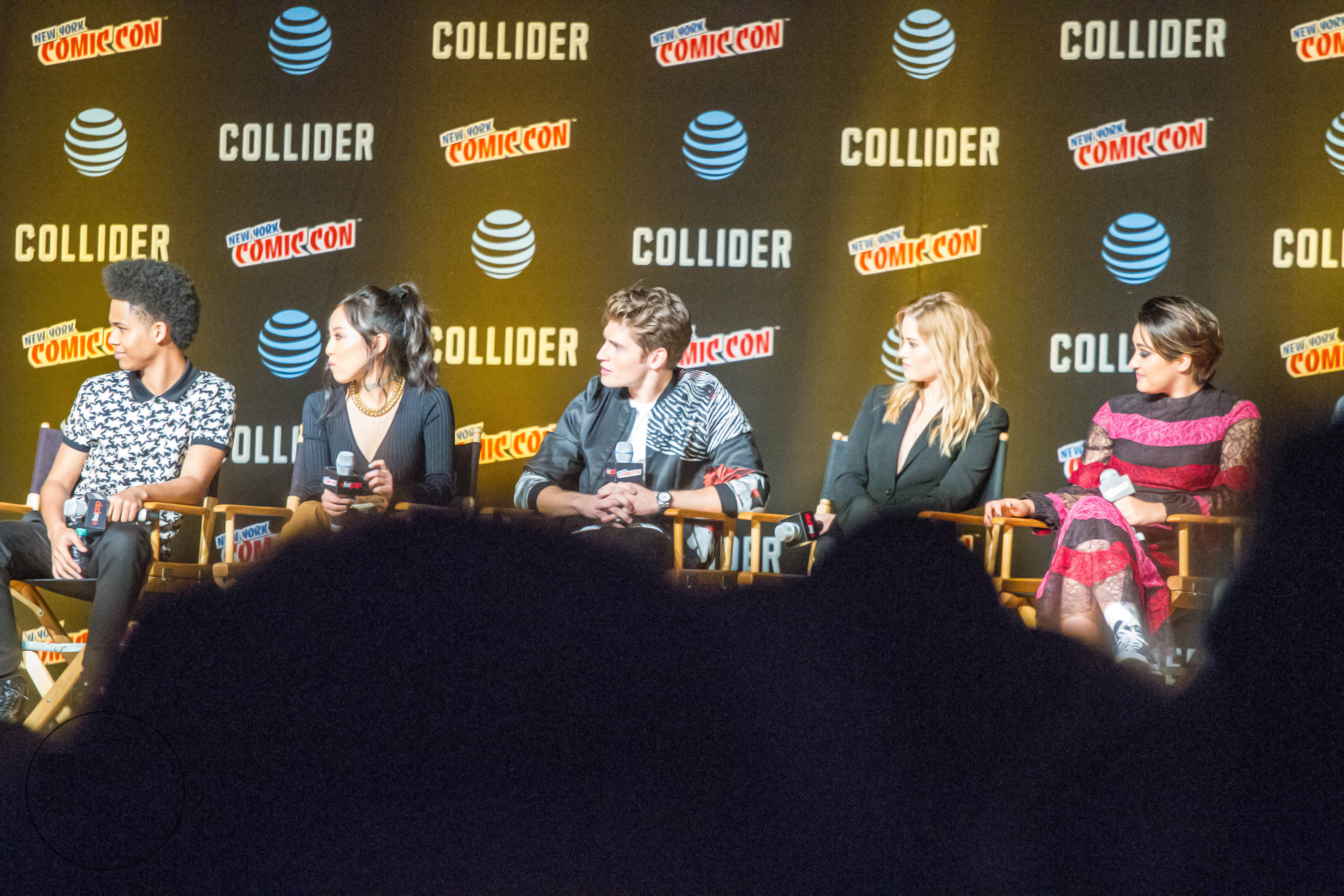
Cast of Runaways at the 2017 New York Comic Con (L-R: Rhenzy Feliz, Lyrica Okano, Gregg Sulkin, Virginia Gardner and Ariela Barer)

In February 2017, Marvel announced the casting of the Runaways, with Rhenzy Feliz as Alex Wilder, Lyrica Okano as Nico Minoru, Virginia Gardner as Karolina Dean, Ariela Barer as Gert Yorkes, Gregg Sulkin as Chase Stein, and Allegra Acosta as Molly Hayes Hernandez. Shortly after, Marvel announced the casting of the Pride, with Ryan Sands as Geoffrey Wilder, Angel Parker as Catherine Wilder, Brittany Ishibashi as Tina Minoru, James Yaegashi as Robert Minoru, Kevin Weisman as Dale Yorkes, Brigid Brannagh as Stacey Yorkes, Annie Wersching as Leslie Ellerh Dean, Kip Pardue as Frank Dean, James Marsters as Victor Stein, and Ever Carradine as Janet Stein. Loeb praised casting director Patrick Rush, explaining that all of the series regulars for Runaways were the producers' first choice for the role. The majority of the children are portrayed by "fresh faces", which was an intentional choice. By August 2017, Julian McMahon had been cast in the recurring role of Jonah. He was promoted to series regular for the second season.

For the second season, Schwartz noted that "really popular, exciting characters" from the comics would appear. In October 2018, it was announced that Jan Luis Castellanos had joined the cast as Topher. Clarissa Thibeaux was cast as Xavin.

In June 2019, Elizabeth Hurley was announced as cast in the role of Morgan le Fay for the third season.

=== Filming ===
Filming of the pilot began by February 10, 2017, in Los Angeles, under the working title Rugrats, and concluded on March 3. Director Brett Morgen was given free rein by Marvel and Hulu to establish the look of the series, and wanted to create a feel that was "very grounded and authentic". He also looked to differentiate between the hand-held, gritty world of the Runaways and the more stylistic world of the Pride. He felt the latter could be explored more in the series moving forward, but was not available to direct any more episodes of the season. Following completion of the pilot and the show's pick-up to series, there was concern among the cast and crew that the impending writers' strike would prevent the series to move forward. However, the strike did not happen, and filming for the rest of the season began at the end of June, again in Los Angeles. Production on the season had concluded by October 21.

Production of the second season began the week of April 23, 2018, again in Los Angeles under the working title Rugrats. Filming for the season continued until late September 2018. Filming for the third season began on May 13, 2019.

=== Music ===
In May 2017, Siddhartha Khosla was hired to compose the music for the series. Khosla said that, due to his history as a songwriter, his scoring process involves "working on these song-stories and weaving them through different episodes". He described the Runaways score as being "completely synthesized", utilizing analog synthesizers from the 1980s, specifically the Roland Juno-60 and Oberheim synths. Khosla compared the "alternative feel" of his score to Depeche Mode, adding "there is an element of rebellion, so sonically going for something that is a little bit outside the box, non-traditional, I felt was an appropriate approach. I feel like I'm making art on this show." Alex Patsavas serves as music supervisor, having done so on all of Schwartz and Savage's previous series. On January 12, 2018, a soundtrack from the first season consisting of 12 licensed tracks plus two by Khosla, was released digitally.

Runaways (Original Soundtrack)
No.	Title	Artist(s)	Length
1.	"Runaways Theme"	Siddhartha Khosla	1:13
2.	"May I Have This Dance"	Francis and the Lights	2:53
3.	"Cane Shuga"	Glass Animals	3:17
4.	"King Charles (Clean)"	Yungblud	2:41
5.	"Drinkee"	Sofi Tukker	4:59
6.	"Ocean Eyes (Blackbear Remix)"	Billie Eilish	3:14
7.	"Beat Goes On"	Lizzy Land	3:40
8.	"All My Heroes"	Bleachers	3:03
9.	"Antidote (Live Arrangement)"	Emily Wells	5:43
10.	"Fuerza (feat. Nani Castle)"	Tony Quattro	3:40
11.	"Beyond a Mortal"	Austra	5:45
12.	"Long Life"	Bombadil	2:38
13.	"Blanket Me"	Hundred Waters	4:56
14.	"Gert's Lullaby"	Siddhartha Khosla & Ariela Barer	2:19

Additionally, the original score for the series was released digitally on January 26. All music by Siddhartha Khosla:

Runaways (Score)
No.	Title	Length
1.	"Runaways Theme"	1:12
2.	"Safe With Us"	1:28
3.	"Pride"	3:40
4.	"Go. Go. Go."	3:36
5.	"Man in Bed"	1:29
6.	"In Love With Her Question Mark"	2:09
7.	"Someone"	3:36
8.	"Pretends Not to Hear"	3:36
9.	"Alpha User Has Arrived"	2:47
10.	"Gert's Lullaby" (featuring Ariela Barer)	2:17
11.	"Staff of One"	0:26
12.	"Step. On. It."	2:23
13.	"I'm Victor, Victor Stein"	2:46
14.	"Molly's Escape"	2:46
15.	"Think You Got Hacked"	3:38
16.	"Not on the Same Side Anymore"	4:20
17.	"Runaways V Pride"	5:10

=== Marvel Cinematic Universe tie-ins ===
Loeb confirmed in July 2017 that the series would be set in the MCU but that the show's characters would not be concerned with the actions of the Avengers, for example, saying, "Would you be following Iron Man [on social media] or would you be following someone your own age? The fact that they've found each other and they're going through this mystery together at the moment is what we're concerned about, not what Captain America is doing." The showrunners considered the series' connection to the MCU to be "liberating" since it allowed them to set the series in a universe where superheroes and fantasy are already established and do not need to be explained to the audience. Schwartz said they "were very capable of telling the story that we wanted to tell independent of any of the other Marvel stories that are out there." Initially, Loeb had said that there were no plans to crossover across networks with the similarly themed Cloak & Dagger on Freeform, as Marvel wanted the series to find its footing before further connecting with other elements of the universe, though "You'll see things that comment on each other; we try to touch base wherever we can... things that are happening in L.A. are not exactly going to be affecting what's happening in New Orleans [where Cloak & Dagger is set]... It's being aware of it and trying to find a way [to connect] that makes sense." On August 1, 2019, it was revealed that season 3 would include a crossover episode with Cloak & Dagger.

Roxxon Energy, a company featured throughout the MCU, has its logo shown in the series. It also mentions Wakanda. Speaking to the third season, the showrunners said the series would "deepen [its] connection" to the Marvel Universe. It features the Dark Dimension, as well as the Darkhold as it was portrayed on Agents of S.H.I.E.L.D..

== Marketing ==
Cast members and Schwartz and Savage appeared at New York Comic Con 2017 to promote the series, where a trailer for the series was revealed, along with a screening of the first episode. The series had its red carpet premiere at the Regency Bruin Theatre in Westwood, Los Angeles on November 16, 2017.

== Release ==
Runaways premiered its first three episodes on Hulu in the United States on November 21, 2017, with the first season consisting of 10 episodes, and concluding on January 9, 2018. The series aired on Showcase in Canada, premiering on November 22, and aired on Syfy in the United Kingdom premiering on April 18, 2018. The premiere episode made its broadcast debut in the United States on Freeform on August 2, 2018, following the airing of the first-season finale of Cloak & Dagger; the airing is part of Freeform's ongoing marketing partnership with Hulu. The first season was also made available on Disney+ when it launched on November 12, 2019. The second season, consisting of 13 episodes, was released in its entirety on December 21, 2018. The third season was released on December 13, 2019, and became available on Disney+, along with season two, on January 10, 2020.

Runaways was removed from Hulu and Disney+ globally on May 26, 2023, as part of Disney's cost-cutting measures. The series was still available to purchase or rent through video on demand services. In May 2024, Runaways was acquired by the CW, making it available to watch through its platform. In February 2026, it became available on Tubi.

== Reception ==
=== Critical response ===
Critical response of Runaways
Season	Rotten Tomatoes	Metacritic
1	85% (82 reviews)	68 (22 reviews)
2	84% (25 reviews)	—N/a
3	83% (12 reviews)	—N/a

The review aggregator website Rotten Tomatoes reported an 85% approval rating for the first season, based on 82 reviews, with an average rating of 7.8/10. The website's consensus reads, "Earnest, fun, and more balanced than its source material, Runaways finds strong footing in an over-saturated genre." Metacritic, which uses a weighted average, assigned a score of 68 out of 100 based on 22 critics, indicating "generally favorable reviews".

Reviewing the first two episodes of the series, Joseph Schmidt of ComicBook.com praised the show for its faithfulness to the comics, but also for some of the changes it made, appreciating the increased focus on the parents. He thought the cast portraying the Runaways was "pretty spot on", but "many of the parents are scene stealers", highlighting the performances of Marsters, Wersching, and Pardue.

The second season has an approval rating of 84% on Rotten Tomatoes, based on 25 reviews, with an average rating of 6.6/10. The website's critical consensus states, "Runaways hits the ground running in its sophomore season, but though it deepens the connections between its expansive cast, formulaic stories and an over-dependence on plot devices holds it back from fully maturing into a compelling character study."

The third season has an approval rating of 83% on Rotten Tomatoes, based on 12 reviews, with an average rating of 7.9/10. The website's critical consensus states, "By focusing on its strong ensemble and the character moments fans have come to love, Runaways ends its three season run on an exciting–and surprisingly introspective–high note."

=== Accolades ===
Year	Award	Category	Recipient	Result	Ref.
2017	Golden Issue Awards	Best Ensemble Cast	Runaways	Won	
2018	Jerry Goldsmith Awards	Best Score for a TV show	Siddhartha Khosla	Nominated	
2018	Saturn Awards	Best New Media Superhero Series	Runaways	Nominated	
2019	BMI Awards	BMI Streaming Media Awards	Siddhartha Khosla	Won	
2019	Saturn Awards	Best Streaming Superhero Television Series	Runaways	Nominated	
2019	Teen Choice Awards	Choice Drama TV Show	Runaways	Nominated	
