= Geoffrey Wilder =

Marvel Comics supervillain

Publication information
- Publisher: Marvel Comics
- First appearance: Runaways #1 (February, 2003)
- Created by: Brian K. Vaughan; Adrian Alphona

In-story information
- Team affiliations: Loners; The Pride
- Abilities: Leadership

Geoffrey Wilder is a supervillain appearing in American comic books published by Marvel Comics. The character has appeared primarily in the series Runaways. Geoffrey is the leader of the Pride, a supervillain crime ring in Los Angeles. He is the father of Alex Wilder.

Ryan Sands portrays Geoffrey in the Hulu series Runaways, set in the Marvel Cinematic Universe.

== Publication history ==
Geoffrey Wilder first appeared in Runaways #1 and was created by Brian K. Vaughan and Adrian Alphona.

== Fictional character biography ==
Geoffrey Wilder and his recent bride Catherine were lowly thieves in 1984 Los Angeles. After a heist, they were abducted by the Gibborim, a group of giants who needed them to bring their plan to fruition. Along with five other couples, the Wilders formed the Pride, a group dedicated to bringing about the end of the world for the Gibborim. Each couple had their unique powers augmented by the Gibborim, meaning that Geoffrey and Catherine's shrewdness was increased, allowing them to become crime lords. The Gibborim also promised that six of the twelve members of the Pride would be saved after the world ended. A few years later, the couples decided to each have a single child and have their children be saved.

Nearly two decades later, Geoffrey's son Alex becomes suspicious of his parents' activities. Geoffrey is a strict father to Alex, looking down on his obsession with internet games and computer skills. Alex spies on his parents and learns of the Pride, leading to the creation of the Runaways.

While the children of the Pride are on the run, Geoffrey and the other members of the Pride organize the Los Angeles Police Department to find their children by framing them for the death of a girl killed by the Pride as well as the kidnapping of Molly Hayes, one of the children of the Pride.

Eventually, the Runaways and the Pride meet in a final showdown in an undersea structure. The Runaways stop the Pride's plan to offer a sacrifice to the Gibborim. The Gibborim kill Alex Wilder, who is revealed to have been loyal to the Pride. The Gibborim go on to destroy the structure, killing the entire Pride as the remaining members of the Runaways escape.

=== 1985 version ===
Several months later, Alex's friends learn about his death and discover several files from his computer. The files claim that the Pride was a group of heroes (as opposed to villains as reported by the Daily Bugle), and contain a ritual detailing how to resurrect Alex. When Alex's friends perform the spell, they accidentally resurrect Geoffrey instead. The Geoffrey they raised from the dead is his past self from 1985, who has only been with the Pride for a year. Geoffrey recruits Alex's friends to his side and reforms the Pride with them as members. He intends to use them to regain favor with the Gibborim by sacrificing one of the Runaways, a plot the other members of the new Pride are unaware of. During this period, he poses as Chamber to infiltrate Excelsior and get information on the Runaways.

Wilder is eventually stopped by the Runaways, but manages to impale and kill Gertrude Yorkes. The Runaways then erase his memory from his time in 2006, and return him to his home time.

== Other versions ==
An alternate universe version of Geoffrey Wilder appears in Ultimate Comics: The Ultimates #22. This version is the attorney general of the United States under President Steve Rogers.

== In other media ==
Geoffrey Wilder appears in Runaways (2017), portrayed by Ryan Sands. This version is a former member of the Crips and the head of a construction company. Additionally, he is depicted as more sympathetic than his comics counterpart and willing to reconnect with his son Alex.
