= Cover Me (compilation album) =

Compilation album by Various artists
- Released: 1986 (Vinyl); 1989 (CD)
- Recorded: 1975–86
- Genre: Rock
- Length: 47:35 (Vinyl); 54:55 (CD)
- Label: Rhino

Professional ratings
Review scores
Source	Rating
AllMusic	3/5 stars

Cover Me is a compilation album of songs written by Bruce Springsteen and performed by various artists. It includes both well known renditions and obscure covers of Springsteen compositions. It was released on vinyl in 1986 and re-released on compact disc in 1989 with two additional tracks by Greg Kihn. The CD version also substituted The Pointer Sisters' version of "Fire" for the Robert Gordon version.

== Vinyl track listing ==
All songs written by Bruce Springsteen, except where noted.

Side One
No.	Title	Performing artist	Length
1.	"From Small Things (Big Things One Day Come)"	Dave Edmunds	3:33
2.	"Talk to Me"	Southside Johnny and the Asbury Jukes	4:00
3.	"Club Soul City"	Gary U.S. Bonds	3:41
4.	"Reason to Believe"	The Beat Farmers	2:36
5.	"The Fever"	Southside Johnny and the Asbury Jukes	5:10
6.	"Because the Night" (Springsteen, Smith)	Patti Smith	3:25

Side Two
No.	Title	Performing artist	Length
1.	"Fire"	Robert Gordon	2:39
2.	"Love on the Wrong Side of Town" (Springsteen, Steven Van Zandt)	Southside Johnny and the Asbury Jukes	3:12
3.	"4th of July, Asbury Park (Sandy)"	The Hollies	4:11
4.	"This Little Girl"	Gary U.S. Bonds	3:43
5.	"Johnny 99"	Johnny Cash	3:37
6.	"Atlantic City"	The Reivers (credited as Zeitgeist)	3:18
7.	"Hearts of Stone"	Southside Johnny and the Asbury Jukes	4:30

== CD track listing ==
No.	Title	Performing artist	Length
1.	"From Small Things (Big Things One Day Come)"	Dave Edmunds	3:33
2.	"Talk to Me"	Southside Johnny and the Asbury Jukes	4:00
3.	"Club Soul City"	Gary U.S. Bonds	3:41
4.	"Reason to Believe"	The Beat Farmers	2:36
5.	"The Fever"	Southside Johnny and the Asbury Jukes	5:10
6.	"Because the Night" (Springsteen, Smith)	Patti Smith	3:25
7.	"For You"	Greg Kihn	4:01
8.	"Fire"	The Pointer Sisters	3:28
9.	"Love on the Wrong Side of Town" (Springsteen, Steven Van Zandt)	Southside Johnny and the Asbury Jukes	3:12
10.	"4th of July, Asbury Park (Sandy)"	The Hollies	4:11
11.	"This Little Girl"	Gary U.S. Bonds	3:43
12.	"Johnny 99"	Johnny Cash	3:37
13.	"Rendezvous"	Greg Kihn	2:30
14.	"Atlantic City"	The Reivers	3:18
15.	"Hearts of Stone"	Southside Johnny and the Asbury Jukes	4:30
