= Linda Louise Duan =

British actress (born 1993)

- Born: 13 December 1993 (age 32); Chester, Cheshire, England
- Other name: Linda Duan
- Education: École Philippe Gaulier
- Occupation: Actress
- Years active: 2016–present
- Website: www.lindalouiseduan.com

Linda Louise Duan (born 13 December 1993) is a British actress.

== Early life and education ==
After A-levels, Linda became interested in performing after taking a mime course with Desmond Jones: "Desmond was the man who got me to reconsider my options of pursuing something outside of a standard degree... He later went on and told me about other specialist schools that I would not have known much about... I thought about it carefully and decided to talk to my Dad about this possibility....with his blessing, I went down that road!" After graduating, Duan began to audition for more roles.

== Career ==
Duan was in Israel when she was contacted by assistant director Holly Gardner to audition for a secret project. When she learned that it involved Marvel Studios, she immediately flew back to London to audition. She eventually learned that it was Doctor Strange and began to research her character Tina Minoru. Duan found the role invigorating despite the character's limited appearance, but hopes that it would open doors for other actresses: "I want to be a good role model for Chinese girls growing up. When I was growing up I had Barbie dolls with blonde hair and blue eyes and that’s what my perception of beauty was because that’s what I was exposed to...I want to see more characters like Mulan."

== Personal life ==
Duan practices karate in her spare time.

== Filmography ==
Year	Title	Role	Notes
2016	Doctor Strange	Tina Minoru	Cameo appearance
2017	The Breadwinner	—N/a	End credits music video producer
2017	Journey's End	—N/a	Behind the scenes
2018	Beautified	Alice	Short film
2018	Bohemian Rhapsody	—N/a	Stunt performer
2018	Chopsticks!!	Shu	Short film
2019	10 Minutes For A Pound	Grace	Short film
2020	Dune Drifter	Sousie	
