= Protect Me =

Protect Me may refer to:

- "Protect Me" a song by James from Seven, 1992
- "Protect Me" a song by Stefflon Don from Island 54, 2024
- "Protecting Me" a song by Aly & AJ from Into the Rush, 2006
- "Protège-Moi", a song by Placebo, 2004
- "Protect-Me", a cyber-security and Data-analysis company
