= James Yaegashi =

Japanese American actor

- Born: Yokohama, Japan
- Education: University of Missouri–Kansas City
- Occupation: Actor
- Years active: 1993–present
- Spouse: Tami Schuch
- Children: 2

James Yaegashi (Japanese: 八重樫ジェイムズ) is a Japanese-American actor based in New York.

== Early life ==
James Yaegashi was born in Yokohama and raised in Yamagata to an American mother and a Japanese father. Upon graduating high school, he moved to America and majored in acting and directing at University of Missouri–Kansas City. He moved to New York City with his wife in 1998.

== Career ==
He has acted in various stage productions, including as Mr. Yunioshi in a stage production of Breakfast at Tiffany's; a role that had historically been played in yellowface. Of the character Yaegashi said "He's a real character, for starters. The film...made so many changes to the story...Yunioshi is a Nisei, a Japanese American from California. In the movie, Mickey Rooney played him as if he was fresh off the boat." He ultimately felt it was necessary to play the character to portray ethnic characters in a positive light. Yaegashi first entered the Marvel Cinematic Universe (MCU) with a minor role in Daredevil, but had a more notable role when he was cast as Robert Minoru in the Hulu original series Runaways based on the Marvel Comics series. In 2004, he voiced the Chinese Triad leader, Wu Zi Mu, in the action-adventure game Grand Theft Auto: San Andreas. He later voiced an undercover police officer called Charlie in Grand Theft Auto IV (2008) and the expansion pack The Lost and Damned (2009). He also voiced Dr. Yi Suchong in the first-person shooter game BioShock (2007) and one of its sequels, BioShock Infinite: Burial at Sea (2014).

== Personal life ==
James Yaegashi is married with two children. He is also bilingual.

== Filmography ==
Film roles
Year	Title	Role	Notes
1999	The Thomas Crown Affair	Crown Acquisitions Executive	
1999	Spin the Bottle	Cole	
2000	Lisa Picard Is Famous	Alex	
2001	Thirteen Conversations About One Thing	Legal Assistant	
2007	Superheroes	James	
2007	Noise	Japanese Businessman	
2008	The Collective	The Janitor	
2011	Lefty Loosey Righty Tighty	—N/a	Director
2012	Man on a Ledge	Police Technician	
2024	Civil War	Commercial Corporal	

Television roles
Year	Title	Role	Notes
2008	Cashmere Mafia	Frederic	Episode: "Pilot"
2016	Madam Secretary	Rick	Episode: "Unity Node"
2016	Daredevil	Leader	Episode: "Regrets Only"
2017–2019	Runaways	Robert Minoru	Main cast
2019	New Amsterdam	Ethan Kimura	Episode: "The Karman Line"
2021	The Blacklist	Alexander Frayne	2 episodes
2023	Mech Cadets	Captain Skip Tanaka (voice)	10 episodes
2024	Fallout	Leon Von Felden	Episode: "The Beginning"
2024	Law & Order: Organized Crime	ATF Special Agent Marcus Cole	2 episodes

Theater roles
Year	Title	Role	Notes
2003	Take Me Out	Takeshi Kawabata	Broadway
2005	A Naked Girl on the Appian Way	Bill Lapin	Broadway
2013	Breakfast at Tiffany's	I. Y. Yunioshi	Broadway
2014	The Oldest Boy	Father	Off-Broadway

Video game roles
Year	Title	Role	Notes
2004	Grand Theft Auto: San Andreas	Wu Zi Mu	Also motion capture
2005	Midnight Club 3: Dub Edition	Tomoya (Tokyo)	
2007	BioShock	Dr. Yi Suchong	
2008	Grand Theft Auto IV	Charlie / The Crowd of Liberty City	
2014	BioShock Infinite: Burial at Sea	Yi Suchong / Bartender	
2021	Grand Theft Auto: The Trilogy – The Definitive Edition	Wu Zi Mu	Archival recordings Remaster of Grand Theft Auto: San Andreas only
