= Brigid Brannagh =

American actress

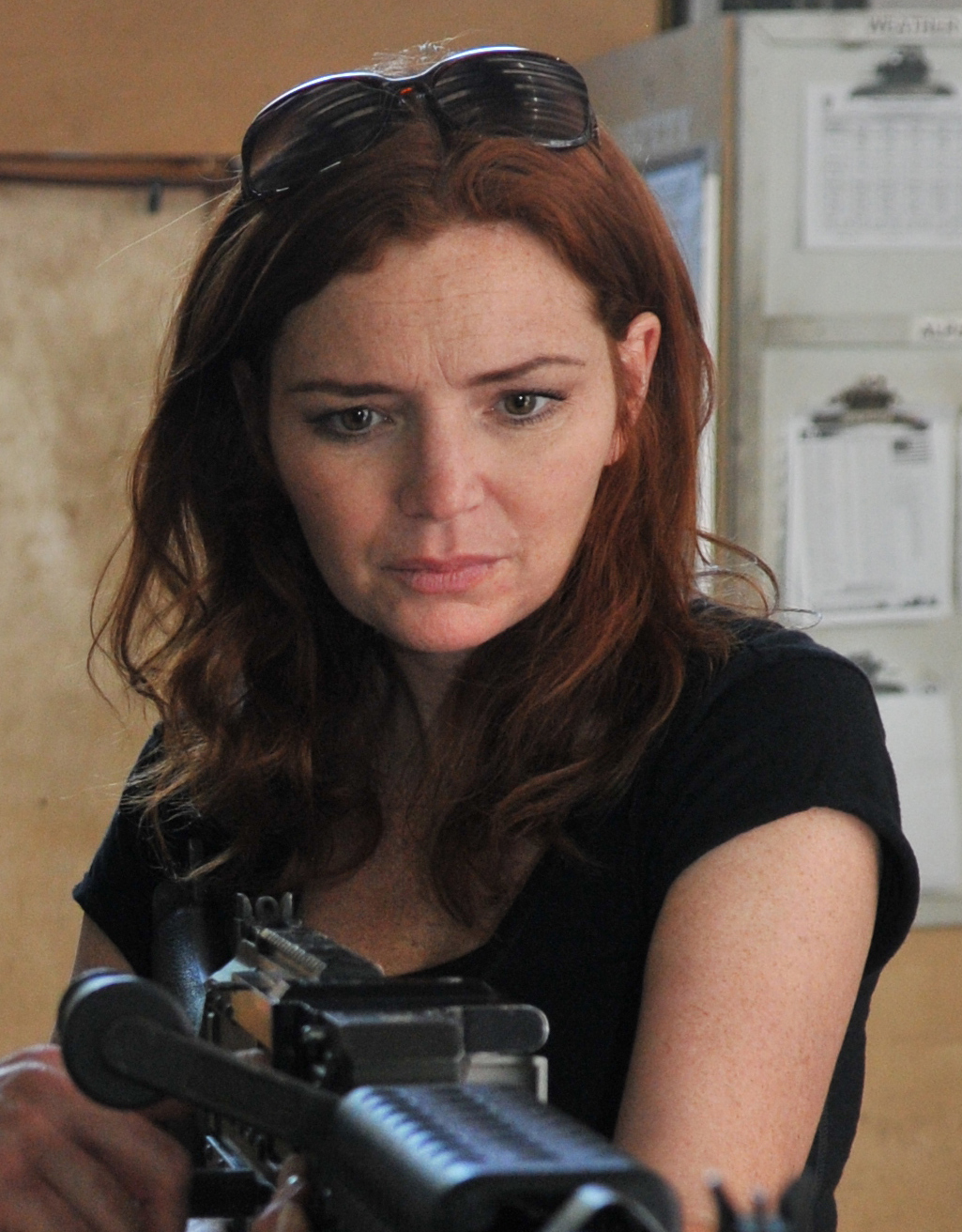
- Brigid Brannagh, 2011
- Born: Brigid Conley Walsh; August 3, 1972 (age 54); San Francisco, California, U.S.
- Other names: Brigid Brannah; Brigid Brannaugh; Brigid Walsh
- Occupation: Actress
- Years active: 1988–present
- Known for: Army Wives
- Spouse: Justin Lyons (m. 2003)

Brigid Brannagh (born Brigid Conley Walsh; August 3, 1972) is an American actress. She is best known for her role as Pamela Moran in the Lifetime series Army Wives. She also appeared in The WB series Angel and the Hulu series Runaways.

== Early life and education ==
Born in San Francisco, California, Brannagh is of Irish ancestry. She is the fourth child of nine children. She began auditioning for roles around age 13.

== Career ==
She is a frequent guest star on various television programs, including a recurring role on CSI: Crime Scene Investigation, playing serial felon Tammy Felton in the first and second seasons. She starred in Kindred: The Embraced and Over There. She also had the recurring role of Virginia Bryce, Wesley Wyndam-Pryce's girlfriend, during the second season of Angel.

In 1999, Brannagh guest starred on a season 2 episode of the TV series Charmed ("That Old Black Magic") as an evil witch named Tuatha.

In 1991 and 1992, she was featured in the Fox sitcom True Colors about an interracial family.

In 2003, Brannagh played the part of "Ruby" in the Star Trek: Enterprise episode "First Flight".

In 2007, she landed a role in the Lifetime series Army Wives, in which she portrayed Pamela Moran for six seasons until Spring 2012.

She starred in Hallmark movie Crush on You, which aired in June 2011 and in an independent movie Not That Funny.

Soon after leaving Army Wives, Brannagh joined the cast of the proposed ABC drama series Gilded Lilys as Elizabeth, the matriarch of the Lily family. The show began filming in March 2012 in Boston after being ordered in late January. Gilded Lilys was created and produced by Shonda Rhimes. However, ABC did not pick up the series.

From 2017 to 2019, Brannagh portrayed Stacey Yorkes in the Hulu television series Runaways.

== Filmography ==
=== Film ===
Year	Film	Role	Notes
1988	The Wrong Guys	Louie's sister	Credited as Brigid Walsh
1993	Quest of the Delta Knights	Thena	Credited as Brigid Conley Walsh
1998	The Man in the Iron Mask	Molly Pichon	Credited as Brigid Brannah, alternative title: The Mask of Dumas
1999	The Fair	Maggie	
2002	Life Without Dick	Ivy Gallagher O'Reilly	
2014	The Nurse	Cara	
2015	I'm Not Ready for Christmas	Rose Geller	
2016	They're Watching	Becky Westlake	
2016	Vanished – Left Behind: Next Generation	Sarah	
2016	Te Ata	Bertie Thompson	
2017	You Get Me	Corinne	Direct-to-streaming film

=== Television ===
Year	Film	Role	Notes
1989	Jake and the Fatman	Cheryl Thompson	Episode: "I'll Never Smile Again"
1990	Doogie Howser, M.D.	Suzie Berlooty	Episode: "Tough Guys Don't Teach"
1990–1992	True Colors	Katie Davis	Main role; credited as Brigid Conley Walsh
1993	Rio Shannon		Television movie; credited as Brigid Conley Walsh
1993	The Day My Parents Ran Away	Melanie Hope	Television movie, credited as Brigid Conley Walsh
1994	NYPD Blue	Sandy	Episode: "Dead and Gone"
1994	ER	Jamie Hendricks	Episode: "9 1/2 Hours"
1995	American Gothic	Poppy Bowen	Episode: "Damned If You Don't", credited as Brigid Walsh
1996	Kindred: The Embraced	Sasha	Main role, 6 episodes; credited as Brigid Walsh
1996	Touched by an Angel	Alison Miller	Episode: "Something Blue"
1997	Sliders	Erin	Episode: "Murder Most Foul"
1997	The Inheritance	Ida Glenshaw	Television movie; alternative title: Louisa May Alcott's The Inheritance
1997	Chicago Sons	Melinda	3 episodes
1997	Roar	Shannon	Episode: "Banshee"
1997–1998	Brooklyn South	Emmeline "Emily" Flannagan	4 episodes
1998	Veronica's Closet	Perry's Girlfriend	Episode: "Veronica's $600,000 Pop"; credited as Brigid Conley Walsh
1998	Ally McBeal	Paula	Episode: "Once in a Lifetime"
1998	Dharma & Greg	Donna	2 episodes
1998	Hyperion Bay	Claire	2 episodes; credited as Brigid Conley Walsh
1999	Legacy	Molly	Recurring role, 5 episodes; credited as Brigid Conley Walsh
1999	Charmed	Tuatha	Episode: "That Old Black Magic"
2000	Diagnosis: Murder	Jill Hoving	Episode: "Teacher's Pet"
2000	Early Edition	Rose/Lily Archer	Episode: "Rose"
2000	Bull	Sister Kate	Episode: "Appearance of Impropriety"
2000	The West Wing	Harriet	Episode: "In This White House"
2000–2001	Angel	Virginia Bryce	4 episodes
2001	Citizen Baines	Makeup Artist	3 episodes
2001	CSI: Crime Scene Investigation	Tammy Felton	2 episodes
2002	Philly	Shelly Brower	Episode: "Lies of Minelli"
2002	Just Shoot Me!	Ruth	Episode: "Educating Finch"
2002	The Division	Jessica Billings	Episode: "Full Moon"
2003	Strong Medicine	Abby	Episode: "Blocked Lines"
2003	Star Trek: Enterprise	Ruby	Episode: "First Flight"
2004	24	Kathy McCartney	Episode: "Day 3: 6:00 a.m.-7:00 a.m."
2004	Without a Trace	Stephanie Boothe	Episode: "Bait"
2005	Cold Case	Tina Bream 1998	Episode: "Revenge", credited as Brigid Conley Walsh
2005	NCIS	Catherine Reynolds	Episode: "Conspiracy Theory"
2005	Over There	Vanessa Dumphy	Main role, 11 episodes
2006	Falling in Love with the Girl Next Door	Angela	Television movie
2006	Standoff	Karen	Episode: "Man of Steele"
2007	K-Ville	Wanda	Episode: "AKA"
2007–2012	Army Wives	Pamela Moran	Main role (seasons 1–6), 85 episodes
2010	Next Stop Murder	Molly	Television movie
2011	A Crush on You	Charley Anderson	Television movie
2011	Criminal Minds	Monica Kingston	Episode: "Hope"
2012	Leverage	Caroline Cowan	Episode: "The Low Low Price Job"
2013	Cult	Anabelle Creusen	Episode: "Suffer the Children"
2013	Longmire	Agent Brooks	Episode: "Unquiet Mind"
2013	Drop Dead Diva	Molly Hagen	Episode: "Secret Lives"
2014	Grimm	Sara Fisher	Episode: "Dyin' on a Prayer"
2015	River Raft Nightmare	Sharon Robertson	Television movie; also known as Eyewitness
2015	Supernatural	Rita Johnson	Episode: "Plush"
2016	Major Crimes	Sherry Hickman	3 episodes
2016	Underground	Patty Cannon	Episode: "The White Whale"
2016–2017	Grey's Anatomy	Veronica	2 episodes
2016	His Secret Past	Jennifer	Television movie
2017	The Twin	Ashley	Television movie
2017–2019	Runaways	Stacey Yorkes / Magistrate's Wife	Main role
2020	The Good Doctor	Elise Valens	Episode: "Mutations"
2022	9-1-1: Lone Star	Abe's Mother	Episode: "Thin Ice"
2023	NCIS	Senator Constance Miller	Episode: "Butterfly Effect"
2025	Chicago Med	Cynthia Parker	Episode: "Together One Last Time"
