= Lyrica Okano =

American actress

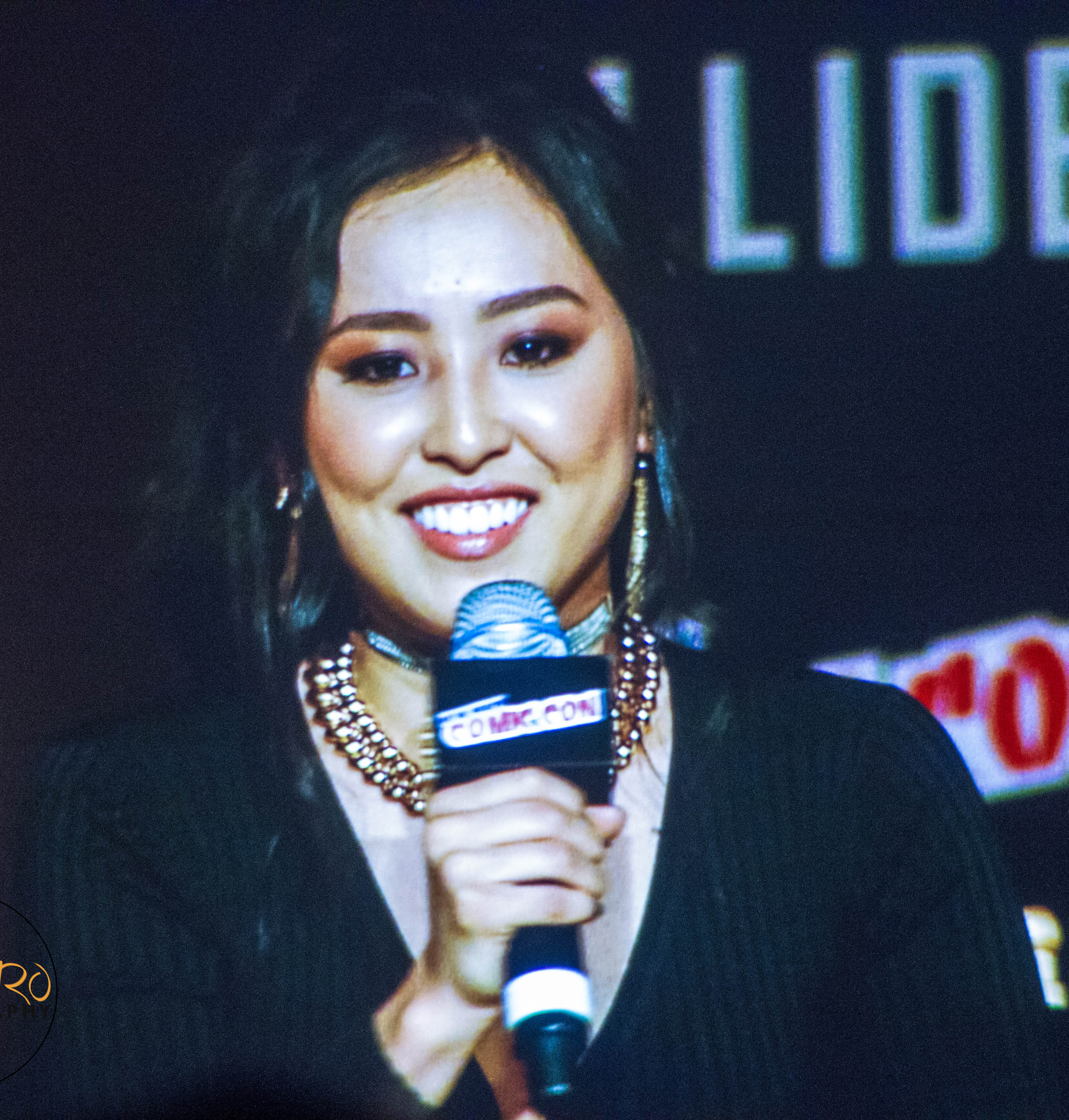
- Okano speaks at the 2017 New York Comic Con
- Born: 1994/1995 (age 31–32); New York City, New York
- Occupation: Actress
- Years active: 2009–present

Lyrica Okano (born 1994 or 1995) is an American actress. She is known for playing the role of Nico Minoru in the Hulu original series Runaways.

== Biography ==
Lyrica Okano was born to parents who emigrated from Tokyo, Japan. They came to the United States in the early 1990s to join the punk rock scene. Her mother ended up becoming an IT tech and her father became a teacher who taught Japanese. At the age of four, she began taking Olympic gymnastics and nearly competed professionally. She stopped taking gymnastics when she was 14 when "[she] realized [she] didn't have any social skills". She was bullied in school for being the only Asian-American girl in her class and when she briefly transferred to Kyoto, she was bullied there as well due to her elementary Japanese-language skills and American mannerisms. Lyrica did manage to befriend a fellow actress, Yuka Taga, whom she would later collaborate with. Her first major role was as Nico Minoru on Runaways, a Hulu original series which was first released in 2017.

== Filmography ==
Television and film roles
Year	Title	Role	Notes
2009	Ikenhisu: To Kill with One Blow	Little Oshota	Film
2014	Unforgettable	Didi	Episode: "Reunion"
2015	The Affair	Chrissy	Episodes 2.8, 2.9
2015	The Michael J. Fox Show	Caroline	Episode: "Dinner"
2016	Pimp	Kim	Film
2017–2019	Runaways	Nico Minoru	Main role
2018	Magnum P.I.	Amanda Sako	Episode: "The Ties That Bind"
2019	Blue Bloods	Margo Chan	Episode: "Past Tense"
2019	The Enemy Within	Hacker	Episode: Pilot
2022	Press Play	Chloe	

Video game roles
Year	Title	Role	Notes
2022	Marvel's Midnight Suns	Nico Minoru (voice)	Tactical role-playing game
