= Angel Parker =

American actress

- Occupation: Actress
- Years active: 2000–present
- Spouse: Eric Nenninger (m. 2002)
- Children: 2
- Website: angelparker.com

Angel Parker is an American actress. Since 2000 she has appeared in numerous films and TV series and has done voice acting on video games. Her most notable credits include Criminal Minds (2008), ER (2008–2009), Lab Rats (2012–2016), Runaways (2017–2019), and The Rookie (2019–present).

== Biography and career ==
Angel Parker was accepted into the American Academy of Dramatic Arts at age 16, and since 2000 she has been acting. Some of her most notable roles include Tasha Davenport on Disney XD's Lab Rats, Shawn Holley in the Emmy Award-winning FX series American Crime Story: The People vs. OJ Simpson, Catherine Wilder, Marvel's action series, Runaways.

In year 2000, she starred in Joss Whedon's Angel. Additional credits include The Good Doctor, NCIS: Los Angeles, 9-1-1: Lone Star, The Rookie, REL, The Strain, Trial & Error, Castle, Criminal Minds, ER, Kevin Costner's ABC pilot National Parks, NBC's pilot La Brea and Grand Crew.

In 2022, she appeared on Animal Kingdom, Hulu's The Dropout, the independent feature film Prisoner's Daughter and Netflix's The Recruit in a recurring role.

== Personal life ==
Parker currently lives in Los Angeles with her husband, actor Eric Nenninger, and their two children James (born 2004) and Naomi (born 2012).

== Filmography ==
=== Film ===
Year	Title	Role	Notes
2012	Free Samples	Joel's Mother	
2015	Gagarin	Zoya Gagarin	Short film
2017	The Female Brain	Jennifer	
2019	Relish	Kristin Harrison	
2020	Thanks Nurses	-	Short film
2020	Philanthropy	Detective Parker	Short film
2020	You Are My Home	Chloe	

=== Television ===
Year	Title	Role	Notes
2000	Angel	Veronica	Episode: "First Impressions"
2006	Rugrats	Gospel Singer/Chorus (voice)	Episode: "Rugrats Tales from the Crib: Three Jacks and a Beanstalk"
2008	Criminal Minds	Cashier	Episode: "The Crossing"
2008	The Young and the Restless	Customer	Episode #1.9049
2008–09	ER	Gibbs	Episode: "Heal Thyself" & "Dream Runner"
2009	Eli Stone	Newlywed Wife	Episode: "Tailspin"
2009	The Closer	Crowd Member #4	Episode: "Half Load"
2009	Brainstorm	Theresa	Episode: "Smells Like a Good Idea"
2010	Castle	Receptionist	Episode: "The Mistress Always Spanks Twice"
2010	Hannah Montana	Sharon	Episode: "California Screamin'"
2012	Days of Our Lives	Carol	Episode #1.11761
2012	The Soul Man	Brenna	Recurring role (Season 1)
2012–16	Lab Rats	Tasha Davenport	Recurring role
2014	Sean Saves the World	Tabitha	Episode: "Sean Saves the World"
2014	Gang Related	Victoria Miller	Episode: "Sangre Por Sangre"
2015	One & Done	Sarah	Episode: "Juan"
2016	YouTube AdBlitz	Mom	Main cast
2016	American Crime Story	Shawn Chapman	Recurring role (Season 1)
2016	Lab Rats: Elite Force	Tasha Davenport	Episode: "They Grow Up So Fast"
2017	Rebel	Stella Parker	Episode: "Pilot"
2017	Trial & Error	Heidi Baker	Recurring role (Season 1)
2017	No, That's Okay. I'm Good.	Angel	Episode: "Angel Parker & Matthew Scott Montgomery"
2017	The Strain	Alex Green	Recurring role (Season 4)
2017–19	Runaways	Catherine Wilder	Main cast
2018	Teachers	Gaye	Episode: "Leggo My Preggo"
2018	Rel	Monica	Episode: "Pilot"
2019–present	The Rookie	Luna Grey	Recurring role
2020	9-1-1: Lone Star	Josie	Episode: "Studs"
2020	Heart Baby Eggplant	OB-Gyn	Episode: "Dick Pics"
2020	NCIS: Los Angeles	Secret Service Agent Alicia Monroe	Episode: "Raising the Dead"
2020–24	Ghost Tape	Drill Sergeant Eliza Wilson	Recurring role
2021	The Good Doctor	Sarah	Episode: "New Beginnings"
2022	Zootopia+	Additional voices	4 episodes
2022	Grand Crew	Judge Eva	Episode: "Wine & Fire"
2022	Baymax!	Additional voices	4 episodes
2022	Dolly Parton's Mountain Magic Christmas	Jasmine	TV movie
2022	Animal Kingdom	Detective Hutchins	Episode: "Gethsemane"
2022–25	The Recruit	Dawn Gilbane	Recurring role
2023	Superman & Lois	Dr. Darlene Irons	3 episodes
2025	All American	Ava Jeremy	Recurring role

=== Video games ===
Year	Title	Role	Notes
2004	Shellshock: Nam '67	Nurses #2	
2005	EverQuest II: Desert of Flames	Unknown	
2008	Condemned 2: Bloodshot	Agent Rosa Angel	
2008	White Knight Chronicles: International Edition	Additional voices	
2009	Where the Wild Things Are	K.W.	
2011	Saints Row: The Third	Pedestrian and Character Voices	
2011	Star Wars: The Old Republic	Additional Voices	
2013	Saints Row IV	The Voices of Virtual Steelport	
2013	Grand Theft Auto V	Various	
2022	Saints Row	Tamira Bowen, Santo Ileso Pedestrains	
