= Ryan Sands =

American actor

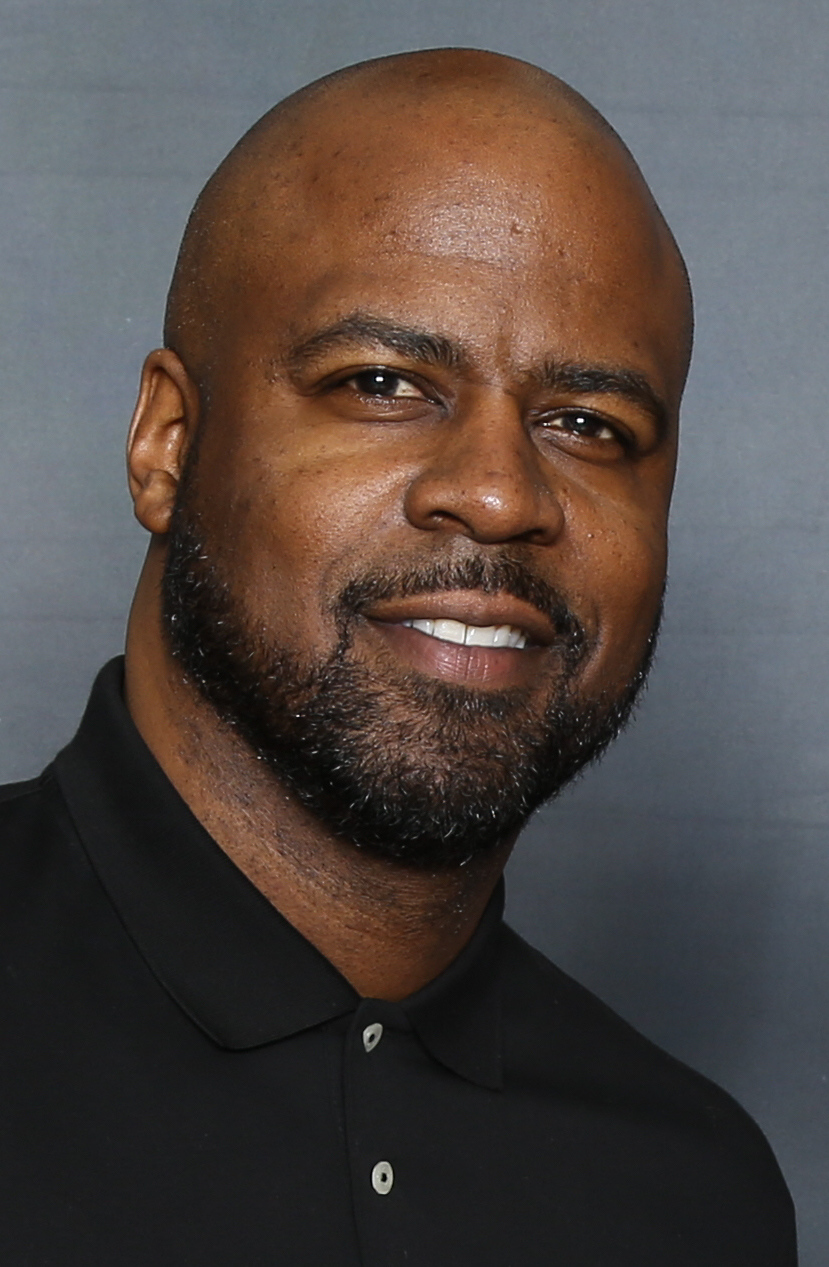
- Sands in 2018
- Born: Washington, D.C.
- Occupations: Actor, Graphic designer
- Years active: 1989-present
- Spouse: Erin Wiley Sands

Ryan Sands is an American actor from Washington, D.C. He is known for his portrayal of Geoffrey Wilder in Marvel's Runaways.

== Early life and education ==
Sands grew up in Washington D.C. along with several older brothers and sisters. His father served in the military and died when Ryan was twelve.

== Career ==
While initially interested in other types of art, Ryan's decision to act started in college after seeing the movie Love Jones. He portrayed Officer Lloyd "Truck" Garrick on The Wire and has since made one-off appearances in shows such as Grimm, Castle, Scorpion, NCIS and Prison Break.

Sands was cast as Geoffrey Wilder in the Hulu adaptation of Marvel's Runaways.

== Filmography ==
Television roles
Year	Title	Role	Notes
1989	Matlock	Policeman #1	Episode: "The Blues Singer"
2003	Hack	Wendell Edison	Episode: "Hidden Agenda"
2004–2008	The Wire	Officer Lloyd "Truck" Garrick	Recurring
2007	The Kill Point	Leroy Barnes	TV miniseries, Main
2009	ER	Jeremy	Episode: "T-Minus-6"
2009	Zimm	Special Agent Clarkson	
2011	The Young and the Restless	Detective	
2011	Crazy Love	Jordan King	
2012	Drew Peterson: Untouchable	State Detective Rogers	TV movie
2012	Grimm	Special Agent Lofthouse	Episode: "The Kiss"
2012	Finding My Obama	Michael	
2014	Castle	Sgt. Taggert	Episode: "Driven"
2015	Scorpion	US Marshal	Episode: "Crossroads"
2015	NCIS	Captain	Episode: "Troll"
2016	Murder in the First	Darius Tompkins	Episode: "Normandy Bitch"
2017	Doubt	Gerald Wright	Episode: "Clean Burn"
2017	Prison Break	Vincent	Episode: "Wine Dark Sea"
2017	Free Rein	Huck	4 episodes
2017–2019	Marvel's Runaways	Geoffrey Wilder	Main cast
2022–2025	The Cleaning Lady	JD Harris	7 episodes

Film roles
Year	Title	Role	Notes
1995	Thru My Eyes	Mike Taylor	Short film
2000	Nothin' 2 Lose	Mookie	Direct-to-video
2000	Out of Obscurity	Otto	Short film
2000	At the Second Traffic Light	The Black Muslim	Short film
2003	Blue Moon	Darrin	Short film
2003	Janet & Mark	Mark	Short film
2003	Preying on the Hunter	Clay Dresden	Short film
2003	Love & Orgasms	Jimmy	
2003	Sinsitivity	Trent Lundy	
2005	Shadowboxer	Ramone	
2005	Se habla español	Dan	
2006	Fatwa	George	
2006	Shattered Imperfection	Peter	Short film
2006	Step Up	History Teacher	
2007	Death Without Consent	Basketball Coach	
2008	Sympathetic Details	Jonathan	
2010	Speed-Dating	Stan	Uncredited
2010	Allen Mack	Detective Ricardo Ellis	Short film
2011	Aide-de-Camp	Sutton	Short film
2014	Red Sky	Defense Attorney	
