= Mohammad Khan =

Mohammad, Mohammed, Muhammad, or Muhammed Khan may refer to:

== People ==
- Muhammad Khan (Ilkhan) (died 1338), claimant to the throne of the Ilkhanate
- Ulugh Muhammad, (1405 – 1445), khan of the Golden Horde and Kazan
- Mohammad Khan Ustajlu (died 1514), commander under the Safavids
- Mohammad Khan Qajar (1742 – 1797), shah of Persia
- Muhammad Khan of Ganja (d. 1780), khan of Ganja
- Muhammad Khan (Khan of Moghulistan) (died 1415), Mughlistan Khanate khan in 1408 – 1415
- Vali Muhammad Khan, leader of the Ashtarkhanid (Janid) dynasty in the Khanate of Bukhara from 1605 to 1611
- Colonel Muhammad Khan (1919 – 1999), Pakistani war hero, humorist and writer
- Muhammad Khan Junejo (1932 – 1993), Pakistani Prime Minister
- Meraj Muhammad Khan (1938 – 2016), founding member of the Pakistan Peoples Party
- Arif Mohammad Khan (born 1951), Indian politician
- Jan Mohammad Khan (? – 2011), politician of Afghanistan
- Muhammad Khan (athlete) (born 1934), Pakistani athlete
- Mohammad Khan (athlete) (born 1911), Afghanistan athlete
- Muhammad Khan (actor) (born 1991), Indonesian actor
- Muhammad Khan (boxer) (1923 – 2013), Pakistani boxer
- Mohamed Khan (1942 – 2016), Egyptian actor and director
- Muhammad Khan (equestrian) (born 1943), Indian Olympic equestrian
- Muhammad Khan Baloch (born 1946), Pakistani politician
- Muhammad Khan Toor Utmankhail (born 1946), Pakistani politician and member-elect of the Provincial Assembly of the Balochistan
- Mohammed Khan (judge), Fijian judge appointed to the Supreme Court of Nauru in 2014
- Muhammad Khan (ruler), Nawab of Balasinor

== Places ==
- Mohammad Khan, Khuzestan, village in Khuzestan Province, Iran
- Mohammad Khan, Sistan and Baluchestan, village in Sistan and Baluchestan Province, Iran
- Mohammad Khan, South Khorasan, village in South Khorasan Province, Iran

== See also ==
- Muhammad Ahmed Khan (disambiguation)
- Mohammad Yusuf Khan (disambiguation)
- Sultan Mohammad Khan (disambiguation)
- Khan Mohammad (1928 – 2009), Pakistani cricketer
- Mohammed Kahn (1823 – 1891), buried as John Ammahaie, Persian–Afghan American Civil War veteran
