= Arnie Roth (character) =

Marvel Comics character

- Arnie in Captain America #270 (June 1982)

Publication information
- Publisher: Marvel Comics
- First comic appearance: Captain America #268 (April 1982) (Note: Cameo appearance; first named appearance occurs in Captain America #270 (June 1982))
- Created by: J. M. DeMatteis & Mike Zeck

In-story information
- Full name: Arnold Roth
- Place of origin: New York City
- Team affiliations: Avengers Support Crew
- Supporting character of: Captain America

Arnold Roth is a fictional character appearing in American comic books published by Marvel Comics. The character was created by writer J. M. DeMatteis and artist Mike Zeck and first appeared in Captain America #268, published in April 1982. Arnie is a childhood friend of Steve Rogers, the civilian identity of the costumed superhero Captain America. Decades later, the pair are reacquainted after Arnie is targeted by Captain America's adversaries Helmut Zemo and the Red Skull. Later in his life, Arnie would assist with the "Captain America Hotline" created to field tips pertaining to national security before dying of bone cancer.

Arnie was the first openly gay character to appear in a mainstream superhero comic. The character was conceived by DeMatteis as part of his effort to develop Captain America's supporting cast and explore how the character "had surrounded himself with people who represented American diversity", though as a result of editorial dictates at Marvel and the restrictions of the Comics Code Authority, DeMatteis was forced to communicate Arnie's sexuality exclusively through imagery and subtext. Though the tragic bent of stories featuring the character has been the subject of criticism, he has been praised as a positive media representation of gay men in the context of a 1980s media landscape characterized by homophobia and backlash against gay men amid the HIV/AIDS crisis.

== Fictional character biography ==
Arnold Roth was born into a Jewish family in the 1920s on the Lower East Side of Manhattan, New York City. A childhood friend to Steve Rogers, Arnie frequently protected the weak and infirm Steve from local bullies. After becoming aware of his homosexuality as a teenager, Arnie began to pursue girls and cultivated a persona as a playboy to compensate, causing him to drift away from the introverted Steve. During World War II, Arnie joined the U.S. Navy while Steve received an experimental serum that turned him into the costumed superhero Captain America. Arnie was able to discern that the secret identity of Captain America was that of his erstwhile friend after seeing the hero in newsreel footage. Sometime after the war, Arnie began a long-term romantic relationship with a teacher named Michael Bech, but also developed a gambling problem.

Some time later, after a now-middle aged Arnie discloses that he knows Captain America's secret identity following a night of drinking, he is approached by Helmut Zemo with an offer to pay off his gambling debts in exchange for the information. When Zemo kidnaps Michael to force Arnie's cooperation, Arnie reconnects with Steve to appeal for his help, though in an ensuing confrontation between Captain America and Zemo wherein the consciousnesses of Arnie and Michael are placed into mutates controlled by Primus, Michael is killed. Though Arnie recovers physically from the ordeal, he is soon targeted by the villainous Red Skull as part of a plot to destroy the lives of Captain America's closest friends. As part of his torture at the hands of Red Skull, Arnie is dressed as a clown and forced to participate in a performance in which he disparages his sexual identity and Michael; Captain America intervenes and rescues Arnie, and assures him that his identity and love for Michael are not shameful.

Arnie recovers but leaves New York to move to Florida, where he loses the weight he has gained in his middle age, and one point works as a publicist for the Avengers as a member of the Avengers Support Crew. Years later, an aged Arnie returns to New York to assist with the "Captain America Hotline" created by Steve to field tips pertaining to national security, becoming the manager of a costume shop used as a front for the operation. After Steve discloses that he is dying due to a breakdown of the serum that gives him his superpowers, (Note: The character would recover after being cryogenically frozen in Captain America #444 (1995).) Arnie confides that he has himself been diagnosed with terminal bone cancer, and has little time left to live. Soon after, Arnie is hospitalized. In their final moment together, Steve kisses Arnie on the forehead and thanks him for his years of friendship; Arnie dies shortly thereafter.

== History ==
=== Context and development ===
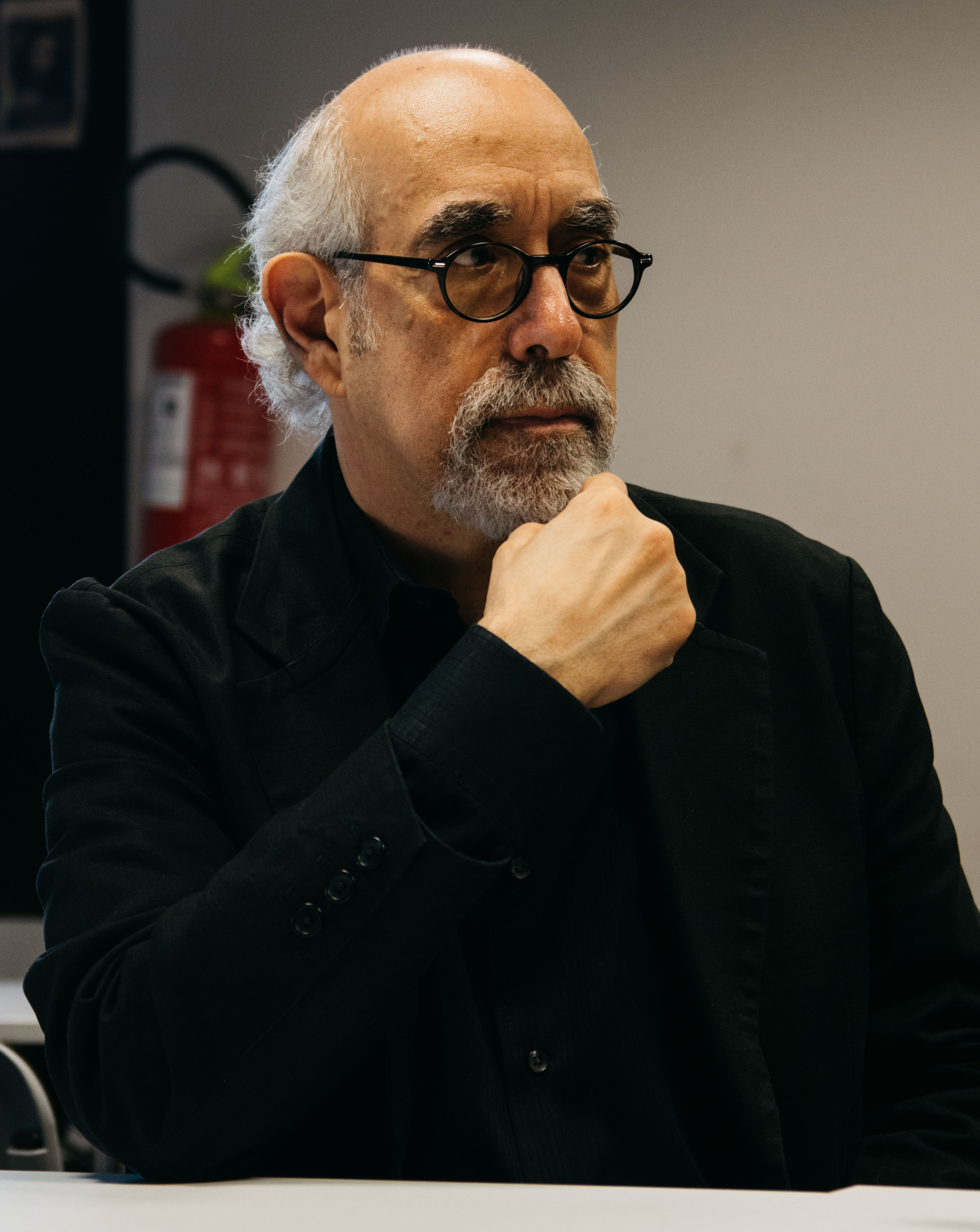
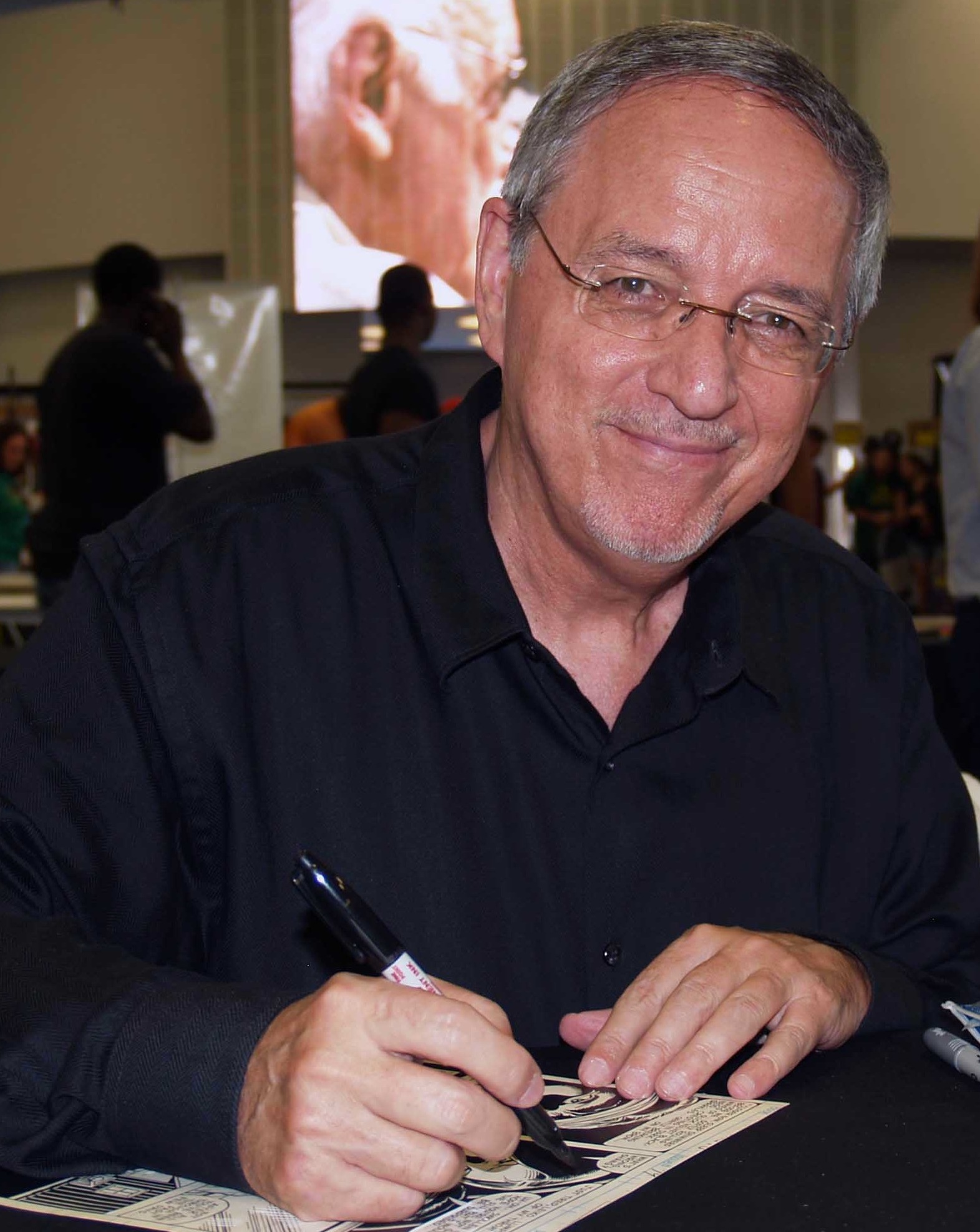
Arnie Roth was created by writer J. M. DeMatteis (left, pictured 2018) and artist Mike Zeck (right, pictured 2013).

Marvel Comics editor-in-chief Jim Shooter instituted a "No Gays in the Marvel Universe" policy in the 1980s, in response to public backlash against a scene in The Hulk #23 (1980) in which Bruce Banner is accosted and threatened with rape by two men at a YMCA. LGBT expressions in comic books were also restricted by the Comics Code Authority, a system of comic book content regulation. Consequently, the sexual orientation of LGBT characters in comics published by Marvel could for many years only be communicated through subtext, as in the case of Northstar in Alpha Flight, and Mystique and Destiny in Uncanny X-Men.

J. M. DeMatteis began writing Captain America in 1981, with Mike Zeck serving as illustrator. DeMatteis stated that he was interested in depicting "what's behind the mask" and exploring Steve Rogers as a man over the hero of Captain America, and to this end focused on developing the character's supporting cast. Throughout his run, he wished to depict how Steve represented the "broad tent of America" and how he "had surrounded himself with people who represented American diversity", such as his Jewish girlfriend Bernie Rosenthal, and his African American friend and superhero partner Sam Wilson. DeMatteis added that it "made sense to me that he would have a gay friend, too. I wasn't trying to hammer anyone over the head with it, it just seemed like a natural thing." The character's name is likely a reference to cartoonist Arnold Roth.

Owing to the restrictions imposed on LGBT characters by Shooter and the Comics Code Authority, Arnie's sexuality is never overtly stated within the text of comic itself; the character initially refers to Michael as his "roommate". DeMatteis made Arnie's sexuality "clear in the context of the story" through conspicuous subtext and imagery, such as Arnie and Michael sitting next to each other on a bed, and hugging when they are reunited. In the aftermath of Arnie's forced performance in the Red Skull storyline, the subtext is rendered almost overtly, with Captain America directly likening his relationship with Bernie Rosenthal to Arnie's relationship with Michael. According to DeMatteis, his original draft of the scene overtly stated Arnie's sexuality, though the "powers that be" objected to the scene and "a page or two" of the comic was revised without his input.

=== Publication history ===
Arnie Roth made his first appearance in Captain America #268 (April 1982) as an unnamed pedestrian who happens to see Steve Rogers on a date with Bernie Rosenthal. He is formally introduced in Captain America #270 (June 1982), where he is retroactively established as Steve's childhood friend. Arnie departed Captain America in issue #306 (June 1985) and would not return until Captain America #428 (June 1994), written by Mark Gruenwald and drawn by Dave Hoover. The character would continue to make appearances in the comic until his death in Captain America #443 (September 1995). Stuart Vandal of The Appendix to the Handbook of the Marvel Universe speculated that the character's death was likely a consequence of Marvel's floating timeline, and the reality that it was increasingly implausible for a character born in the 1920s to be alive in stories set in the modern era.

Arnie has appeared occasionally in flashbacks to Steve's past. In 2012, he appeared in Captain America volume 7, issue 3 written by Rick Remender and penciled by John Romita Jr., and in 2024 appeared in Avengers Academy: Marvel Voices #21 written by Anthony Oliveira and penciled by Carola Borelli.

== Reception and legacy ==
Arnie Roth was the first openly gay character to appear in a mainstream superhero comic, and has been praised as a generally positive representation of gay men in mainstream media of the era. Comics scholar Lee Easton writes that despite the "clichés of dead lovers and tragic endings" prevalent in stories featuring the character, critics have nevertheless regarded him as "quite progressive in the context of America in the 1980s". Aaron Tabak of Geeks OUT writes that Arnie represents "comic-book idealism at its best spirit, however imperfectly executed it may be", noting that while the character is largely rendered as a passive victim who requires saving by the heterosexual Captain America, his story represents "as blatant a critique of homophobia and AIDS hysteria as mainstream comics could allow." Eileen Gonzalez of Book Riot similarly characterizes Arnie's story as "not perfect" in light of its focus on tragedy and reliance on subtext, but praised the depiction of Arnie and Michael as "a down-to-earth, devoted couple without even a whiff of the stereotypes that still dictated how gay men were portrayed."

Media scholar Richard A. Hall praised the "powerful" climax to the Red Skull storyline, describing it as "a cry, not just to Captain America, but to the readers as well. One would be extremely hard-pressed to find any example in all of 1984 American popular culture containing such a powerful plea to the heterosexual community." Media scholar J. Richard Stevens noted how Arnie's inclusion in Captain America added "context and depth to Rogers's character", as "the loyalty and devotion Rogers showed Roth demonstrated his unqualified acceptance and belief in freedom."

Easton notes that the relationship between Arnie and Steve "reverses stereotypes while reinforcing those of hegemonic masculinity", noting that while as children Arnie takes the traditionally masculine role as Steve's protector, as adults it is the "soft, less fit, and more vulnerable" Arnie who must be protected by Captain America. Tabak similarly notes how this role reversal and Arnie's awareness of Captain America's secret identity repurposes "imagery and language of the closet and of coming out [...] towards a superhero's own 'closeted' identity", noting how "invoking that similarity between the superhero experience and that of gay men in America serves to enrich the bond between Arnie and Steve".

DeMatteis stated that he personally regards the backstory of the Marvel Cinematic Universe incarnation of Bucky Barnes, which re-imagines the character as Rogers' childhood friend, as influenced by Arnie Roth, with some writers noting similarities between the characters.
