= Ahmad Khan =

Ahmadkhan or Ahmad Khan (Persian: احمدخان) may refer to:

- Ahmad Shah I (r. 1411–1442), born Ahmad Khan, ruler of the Gujarat Sultanate in India; founded the city of Ahmedabad
- Malak Ahmad Khan Yusufzai (1460–1530), Afghan ruler who founded Pakhtunkhwa
- Ahmad Shah III (r. 1554–1561), born Ahmad Khan, ruler of the Gujarat Sultanate
- Ahmad Khan Bangash (r. 1750–1771), Nawab of Farrukhabad who commanded a division of the Afghan army in the Battle of Panipat
- Ahmad Shah Durrani (c. 1720–1722 – 1772), born as Ahmad Khan Abdali, founder of the Durrani Empire
- Sultan Ahmad Khan (r. 1857–1863), sultan of the Principality of Herat in Afghanistan
- Ahmad Akbar Khan (born 1984), Australian born Pakistani footballer
- Ahmadkhan, Lorestan, a village in Iran

== See also ==
- Ahmed Khan (disambiguation)
