= Kirigi =

Kirigi may refer to:

- Kirigi (Marvel Comics character), a Marvel Comics character
- Kirigi (DC Comics), a DC Comics character
