= Avengers Academy: Marvel's Voices =

Marvel Comics Infinity webcomic

- The cover to the first issue, with art by Carola Borelli and colors by Carlos Lopez.

Publication information
- Publisher: Marvel Comics
- Schedule: Weekly
- Format: Ongoing series
- Genre: Superhero
- Publication date: May 2024 – September 2025
- No. of issues: 60
- Main character(s): Moon Girl & Devil Dinosaur; Red Goblin; Bloodline; Aaron Fischer; Escapade; Kid Juggernaut

Creative team
- Written by: Anthony Oliveira
- Artist(s): Carola Borelli; Bailie Rosenlund; Alba Glez; Pablo Collar; Karen S. Darboe; Ig Guara
- Inker: Elisabetta D'Amico
- Letterer: Ariana Maher
- Colorist(s): Carlos Lopez; K.J. Diaz; Ian Herring
- Editor(s): Sarah Brunstad; Lindsey Cohick

Avengers Academy: Marvel's Voices was a Marvel webcomic written by Anthony Oliveira, with art by Carola Borelli, Bailie Rosenlund, Alba Glez, Pablo Collar, Karen S. Darboe, and Ig Guara. It was published by Marvel Comics through their Marvel Unlimited platform, with 60 issues published between May 2024 and September 2025. The title won the GLAAD Media Award for Outstanding Comic Book at the 37th GLAAD Media Awards in March 2026.

It is a spin-off of the Marvel's Voices webcomic. It focuses on the titular school and the superheroes attending it: Lunella Lafayette (Moon Girl) and Devil Dinosaur, Normie Osborn (Red Goblin), Brielle Brooks (Bloodline), Aaron Fischer (Captain America of the Railways), Shela Sexton (Escapade), and Justin Jin (Kid Juggernaut).

== Publication history ==
In June 2024, Marvel announced that it would be launching a new Avengers Academy comic, this time as a webcomic on Marvel Unlimited, under the "Marvel's Voices" banner. The last six issues of the original Marvel's Voices webcomic (#95-#100) served as a backdoor pilot and introduced new character, Justin Jin, Kid Juggernaut. The webcomic would be weekly, with new issues being published every Wednesday, and it would be written by Anthony Oliveira and drawn by a number of artists, starting with Carola Borelli and Bailie Rosenlund. Per Oliveira:

There's a school for heroes! Your favs are the teachers, their legacies are the students, the Savage Land is in the backyard, a vampire lives next door, and God might be in the basement!

Welcome to the Avengers Academy—rising marvels of the next generation from every corner of the Marvel Universe, choosing for themselves what kind of hero they will be and what kind of world they will save!

Enrollment is beginning for the winter term!

The series is notable for having a number of queer characters, with Oliveira using the character of Arnie Roth in #21. "Arnie Roth feels like an impossible miracle: a queer character created at the absolute height of the AIDS crisis, beating at the heart of Marvel Comics itself in the origin of Steve Rogers. To make a gay man Captain America's closest and dearest friend, a scrappy brawler who knew him before the serum, and who loved him so fiercely before the hero even arose—that, to me, is such an audacious, brave thing for J.M. DeMatteis and his creative team to have done. I think the courage of that still echoes with us."

== Plot summary ==
=== Orientation Day/First Night/Lesson #1: The Fastball Special (#1–4) ===
Captain Marvel welcomes the new class of students—Aaron Fischer, Brielle Brooks, Shela Sexton, Normie Osborn, Justin Jin, Lunella Lafayette and Devil Dinosaur—to the new Avengers Academy campus, located in Manhattan, but also, due to a shard of the M'Kraan Crystal, in the Savage Land and in a place outside space at the same time, too. However, the campus is then attacked by Swarm. Everyone defends the campus against Swarm, while Justin meets M'Kraan, the physical embodiment of the M'Kraan Crystal. Shela manages to swap places with Swarm and Lunella puts the bees to sleep, but not before Aaron is stung many times. Examining the skull of Swarm, Lunella and the others discover it is a cloned skull that someone placed on campus and someone wants them dead. The first night on campus, not able to get to sleep, everyone gets to know each other, with Aaron and Justin, Lunella and Normie, and Shela and Brielle each talking during the night. Normie reveals his secret identity to Lunella. In the next few days, the class learns about fighting and the Fastball Special from guest teachers Wolverine and Colossus, while Lunella develops a special unbreakable metal called "Lunellum" and uses it to make a shield for Aaron.

=== Sinister Six (#5–12) ===
After leaving his work volunteering at the Arnie Roth Community Center, Aaron Fischer confronts Mysteriant, a villain similar to Mysterio who is stealing medicinal supplies from Hexus Pharmaceuticals. Mysteriant explains that he is stealing the supplies to distribute them illegally, reasoning that Hexus is stockpiling the supplies and not putting them to use. After hearing Mysteriant's explanation, Aaron agrees to help him. Mysteriant later explains that he is Qaari Beck, the cousin once removed of Quentin Beck, the original Mysterio. When Quentin was dying from cancer, he gifted Qaari a ring that gave him illusion-casting abilities. Aaron and Qaari go to a nightclub together and romantically embrace before Aaron returns to the Avengers Academy. Qaari is later visited by Squid Kid, who proposes forming a new Sinister Six.

Stanley, Norman Osborn's grandson, is left in Hexus' daycare with Claire, the daughter of Hexus' CEO, while Norman is at a meeting. Stanley is bewildered that Claire survived, as he previously witnessed her burn to death. Claire explains that she returned to life through her connection to Hexus and will survive as long as the company does. Meanwhile, the Sinister Six attack Norman's meeting, intending to expose and undo the effects of their corrupt practices. Normie as Red Goblin intervenes, but is beaten by Willow-Wisp and Squid Kid as Lizard Boy kidnaps Stanley.

The Avengers Academy students are met by a wounded Normie, who tells them to save Stanley. Aaron goes off to confront Mysteriant, who agrees to disarm the sensors for the Avengers Academy's incoming fight with the Sinister Six. When the students confront the Sinister Six on a ship, Squid Kid realizes that Mysteriant has betrayed the Sinister Six and attacks him, apparently killing him. As Rhinoceress and Kid Juggernaut fight, they accidentally breach the ship's hull, causing it to take on water. Lizard Boy saves Stanley, but they are attacked by Squid Kid. Squid Kid is confronted by Mysteriant, who is revealed to have faked his death. Mysteriant publicly broadcasts information he stole from the companies attacked from the Sinister Six, causing the Sinister Six to abandon Squid Kid. Squid Kid is later met by Cherry Crane, who plans to weaponize the blood of Captain America.

=== Makeover/Justin's Day Out (#13–14) ===
Captain Marvel, Wasp, and Shuri begin designing new superhero costumes for the students, who are gifted various weapons and tools. Normie is given a watch that can keep time between dimensions and can generate flame-retardant foam, nullifying his symbiote's vulnerability to extreme heat. Shela is given gravity gauntlets that are more efficient than her previously used gravity dice and allow her to fly. Brielle is given a stake made from a splinter of Yggdrasil, dubbed the Tusk of Ratatoskr, which can track down anyone it has previously injured.

Justin writes a letter to his mother relating his recent escapades, including a time when he was invited to a nightclub with Aaron and Qaari. After going to the nightclub's bar, Justin encountered Cindy Shears, also known as Rhinoceress, who encourages him to have fun and not worry about his current predicaments.

=== My Dinner With Emplate (#15–19) ===
Shela meets up with her friends Morgan Red and Martha Johansson, who encourage her to go on a date with Brielle. After Brielle kisses Shela, she gets nervous and runs off, leaving Brielle behind. Shela is secretly watched by Emplate, who is searching for new sources of bone marrow to feed on. Emplate is shown to have an unnamed prisoner, who he keeps chained up and used for marrow.

Hazmat, who has been attending the Avengers Academy, laments the death of her lover Mettle, who was killed by Arcade while attending the Academy's previous iteration. (Note: As depicted in the series Avengers Arena.) Shela and Brielle both regret their kiss, with Brielle realizing that she is queer, but not wanting to specifically identify her sexuality. When Shela tries to reunite with Brielle, she is captured by Emplate.

Brielle, her cat Walpurgis, and Hazmat enter Emplate's dimension to find Shela. However, Shela has been placed under Emplate's control and gone mad after spending a countless amount of time in Emplate's dimension. Brielle explains to Shela that there is nothing wrong with their relationship and kisses her, freeing her from Emplate's control. Meanwhile, Hazmat discovers that Mettle survived and was captured by Emplate. During his imprisonment, Mettle regenerated his skin and hair, which were destroyed by Norman Osborn. Mettle decapitates D.O.A., Emplate's servant, before escaping from Emplate's dimension.

=== Broken Things (#20) ===
Lunella repairs Arcade's robots — his robot duplicate and the Proletarian — intending to put them to use. Meanwhile, Mettle attempts to return to surfing, but is overwhelmed by trauma from his past experiences. When Mettle falls off his board, he sinks to the seabed and is unable to get back up due to his metallic body weighing him down. Moon Girl rescues Mettle by freezing him with her ice blaster, allowing him to safely float to the surface. When Mettle is brought back to Moon Girl's lab, he sees the Arcade robot and has a panic attack. Mettle decides to have the Arcade robot repurposed to clean up litter.

=== A Hero (#21–23) ===
During World War II, Arnie Roth served in the Navy in the Pacific theater. Shortly after the end of World War II, Captain America was lost at sea and presumed dead, leaving Arnie distraught. Later in his life, Arnie was kidnapped by the Red Skull and forced to dress up as a clown and perform a show that makes fun of his gay identity. In the present day, long after Arnie's death, Cherry Crane organizes a protest against the Arnie Roth Community Center.

Driscoll Reynolds, Cherry Crane's fiance, explains that he does not want to commit violence, but will defend himself and his ideologies if necessary. Crane is revealed to have been Sin, the Red Skull's daughter, and has Reynolds' sleeper programming activated, transforming him to a rampaging red monster. Meanwhile, Aaron and Qaari attempt to get the people inside the center to safety, but are attacked by Sin. Sin destroys Qaari's ring and threatens to drop him to his death.

One of Sin's followers tells Justin that the center is rigged to explode, which will be blamed on Aaron due to his energy signature being present. However, Qaari manages to escape from Sin and disable the bomb. Sin, back in her Cherry Crane persona, escapes as Justin saves the civilians. Later, Aaron encounters Steve Rogers at a candlelight vigil for Arnie Roth and agrees to perform a Kaddish prayer in honor of Arnie.

=== Advent (#24-26) ===
Mephisto seeks to reclaim Billy and Tommy Maximoff, the Scarlet Witch's children, who were created from parts of his essence. However, M'Kraan has taken the children under her protection. Unable to directly attack the two, Mephisto sends his son Blackheart after them instead. Blackheart briefly refuses to hurt the children, stating that they are innocent, but decides to comply with Mephisto. When Shela uses her powers on Blackheart, she takes on his inner pain. Overcome with remorse, Blackheart allows the group to escape. Mephisto, enraged at Blackheart's betrayal, turns him into a human and sends him back to Earth, where he takes refuge at the Academy.

== Reception ==
The League of Comic Geeks gave the first issue a 3.8 average rating and 41 out of 48 people liked it. The series has consistently gotten over 4.0 average ratings, with a high of 4.5.

The title won the GLAAD Media Award for Outstanding Comic Book at the 37th GLAAD Media Awards in March 2026, a third GLAAD Media Award for creator Anthony Oliveira.
