= Yousaf Khan =

Yousaf Khan or similar may refer to:

== People ==
- Yusaf Khan (general) (born 1948), former Pakistan Army general and vice chief of army staff
- Yusuf Husain Khan (1902–1976), historian, scholar and author
- Yousuf Khan (actor) (died 2009), Pakistani film actor
- Yousuf Khan (cricketer) (born 2002), Afghan cricketer
- Yousuf Khan (footballer) (1937–2006), former Indian soccer player
- Yousuf Khan (Pakistani politician), member of the National Assembly of Pakistan from Khyber Pakhtunkhwa (2024–2029)
- Yusuf Khan (actor) (died 1985), Indian actor, father of actor Faraz Khan
- Yousaf Ali Khan, British film director
- Abdul Rahman Khan Yousuf Khan (1925–2007), Indian politician
- Mohammad Yusuf Khan (disambiguation), several people

== Fictional characters ==
- Yusuf Khan and Sherbano, Pashtun folktale
- Yusuf Khan (comics), father of Kamala Khan in Marvel Comics
  - Yusuf Khan (Marvel Cinematic Universe), first appearing in the 2022 series Ms. Marvel
- Yusef Khan, from EastEnders

== Places ==
- Yusef Khan, Iran, village in Iran
