= Mettle (character) =

Marvel Comics superhero

- Mettle as depicted in Avengers Academy #1 (June 2010). Art by Mike McKone (penciler, inker) and Jeromy Cox (colorist).

Publication information
- Publisher: Marvel Comics
- First appearance: Avengers Academy #1 (June 2010)
- Created by: Christos Gage; Mike McKone

In-story information
- Alter ego: Ken Mack
- Team affiliations: Avengers Academy
- Notable aliases: Fortress
- Abilities: Experienced surfer Iridium body grants: Superhuman strength and durability Virtual indestructibility

Mettle (Ken Mack) is a character appearing in American comic books published by Marvel Comics. He was recruited into training at the Avengers Academy to become an Avenger.

== Publication history ==
Mettle first appeared in Avengers Academy #1 (June 2010) and was created by Christos Gage and Mike McKone. He appeared as a regular character in the series through its final issue, #39 (Jan 2013).

Mettle appeared in the first issue of the series Avengers Arena, by Dennis Hopeless and Kev Walker, where he is captured and later killed by Arcade. Long after his death, Mettle was revealed to have survived in the series Avengers Academy: Marvel's Voices.

== Fictional character biography ==
Ken Mack was a sixteen-year-old surfer with a laid-back and carefree attitude. While surfing, he fell into the water and another surfer hit him with their surfboard. The impact ripped off part of his face, revealing a red iridium skull underneath. Ken was taken to Norman Osborn, where Baron Von Blitzschlag explained that his trauma accelerated a transformation that was already taking place. Osborn further accelerates the transformation, changing Ken's body to be completely made of iridium.

=== Heroic Age ===
Mettle is recruited into the Avengers Academy along with five other students who have been affected by Osborn. In a sparring session with Reptil, he is shown to withstand intense heat from a flame thrower with no effect. Noticing that they have been joined by Veil, he comments on her costume, but she becomes frightened by his appearance, changing into her gas form.

He is portrayed as a more responsible member of the new recruits, after discovering that they will all have a training session with Justice and Speedball. During their training session, Speedball increases the difficulty, with Hazmat responding with a radiation blast. Justice suggests that he take a break. Finesse later notices Speedball and Quicksilver arguing about keeping a secret from the cadets. By accessing secret computer files, the students realize that they are not the most powerful, the smartest, or even the most highly trained kids who Osborn kidnapped. Instead, they have been chosen for the academy because they have the greatest potential to go rogue and become dangerous villains.

On a visit to the Raft, Mettle, Hazmat, and Veil plan to find and kill Norman Osborn and kill him for revenge. Hazmat uses her power to cause a blackout, giving Mettle enough time to rip open Osborn's cell door. However, the three let Osborn live when he states that he can fix them. When the students are questioned about who caused the blackout, Mettle lies and says that fate led them to Osborn.

In an attempt to bring back the Wasp, Veil mistakenly resurrects Carina Walters, Michael Korvac's wife. Korvac senses her and arrives to take her back. When Carina refuses to go with him, Korvac attacks, but the Avengers show up to battle him. Carina temporarily transforms Mettle and his teammates to obtain powers from their future selves to defeat Korvac. He punches through Korvac, thinking that he killed him. It is later revealed that his future self seemed comfortable with killing, which scares Mettle. After the fight, Mettle seeks out Hazmat in the student's lounge. They share an emotional moment, knowing they may never be cured. At prom, Mettle and Hazmat enter a romantic relationship.

=== Fear Itself ===
In the Fear Itself storyline, Mettle throws a pole at an armored robot attacking Washington D.C., killing both the pilot and gunner. He feels guilt for doing so, but Tigra reassures him that by killing him, he saved the lives of innocent civilians. When Titania and Absorbing Man attack the Infinite Mansion, Mettle and Hazmat intend to sacrifice themselves for their teammates to escape. However, the Avengers Academy instructors show up to save them. In the aftermath of Fear Itself, Mettle and Hazmat attempt to have sex, but Hazmat is still traumatized over accidentally killing her previous boyfriend. This puts further strain on their relationship, especially when X-23 joins the academy and Reptil, under the control of his future self, creates jealousy.

=== Avengers Vs. X-Men ===
Mettle and the students initially do not take kindly to the junior X-Men, but eventually come to understand the difficult situation that the mutants were forced into by adult superheroes, not unlike their present situation. Mettle especially connects with Loa, who can make the ground into waves and allows Mettle to surf once again. When Sebastian Shaw attempts to free the mutants, the Avengers Academy students side with them, so Tigra feints defeat and allows them to escape. Loa decides to stay at the academy. Mettle and the students defend Juston Seyfert's Sentinel against Emma Frost.

=== Final Exams ===
Mettle and Hazmat succumb to Jeremy Briggs's promise of a normal life and take the "Clean Slate". Having lost his powers and been given a special skin graft, Mettle looks normal again. When he hears that Briggs is threatening their other classmates, Mettle takes the antidote to restore his powers. Shortly afterward, Hazmat burns off his new skin. Mettle and the other students graduate as associate members of the Avengers.

=== Avengers Arena and death ===
In Avengers Arena, Mettle is abducted alongside Hazmat, Reptil, X-23, Juston Seyfert, and a dozen others by Arcade. Mettle is killed by Arcade in Murderworld, sacrificing himself to save Hazmat as the weak link among the 16. When suspicions arise as to where the abductees have gone, Arcade uses a remotely operated copy of Mettle to assuage the worries of Hank Pym..

=== The return of the Avengers Academy ===
In Avengers Academy: Marvel's Voices, it is revealed that Mettle survived the events of Avengers Arena and was captured by Arcade. Arcade then traded Mettle to Emplate, who held him captive for years while feeding on his bone marrow. The process of healing from Arcade's bomb and Emplate's feeding restored Mettle's face and skin. Mettle ultimately defeats Emplate and allows the rest of the new Academy students to escape, reuniting with Hazmat.

== Powers and abilities ==
Possessing a body of living iridium, Mettle is virtually indestructible, shown to be able to withstand the intense heat of a flame thrower. His costume is made of "unstable molecules" that Mister Fantastic designed, which can adjust to his powers. Due to the tampering of Norman Osborn, he is unable to feel the basics of human sensations due to deteriorated nerve endings.

== Other versions ==
- A zombified alternate universe version of Mettle appears in Marvel Zombies Halloween.
- An alternate universe version of Mettle appears in Marvel Universe Vs. The Avengers.

== Reception ==
In an article for The Philadelphia Inquirer, Jerome Maida describes Mettle as an "invulnerable powerhouse."

A review of Avengers Academy #14 by David Pepose for Newsarama expressed his love of the expressions artist Sean Chen gives to the characters, including Mettle "whose face still speaks volumes even as it frozen in the shape of a skull." In his review of Avengers Academy #20, Pepose called Tom Raney's depiction of the "still-faced" Mettle "absolutely heartbreaking."
