= Sultan Mohammad Khan (disambiguation) =

Sultan Mohammad Khan may refer to:

- Sultan Mohammad Khan, regent of Kabul from 1823 to 1826
- Sultan Mahmud Khan, commander of the Sikh Empire
- Sultan Muhammad Khan, Afghan statesman and author
- Sultan Mohammed Khan, Pakistani diplomat
- Sultan Mohammad Khan (politician), Pakistani politician

== See also ==
- Mohammad Khan (disambiguation)
