= Bernie Rosenthal =

Marvel Comics character

- Sketch by John Byrne, c. 1979

Publication information
- Publisher: Marvel Comics
- First comic appearance: Captain America #247 (July 1980) (Note: Unnamed cameo; first named appearance occurs in Captain America #248 (August 1980))
- Created by: Roger Stern & John Byrne

In-story information
- Full name: Bernadette Rosenthal
- Place of origin: New York City
- Supporting character of: Captain America

Bernadette "Bernie" Rosenthal is a fictional character who appears in American comic books published by Marvel Comics. Created by writer Roger Stern and artist John Byrne, she is a romantic interest to Captain America (Steve Rogers) who first appears in the comic book Captain America #247 (April 1980). The two eventually become engaged, but end their relationship amicably after Bernie departs to attend law school.

The character assumed a more prominent role in the run of Captain America written by J.M. DeMatteis, before being phased out of the comic after writer Mark Gruenwald assumed authorship of the series; she has since made infrequent cameos in Captain America. Critics and commentators have commented on Bernie as an archetypal strong female character who embodies the ideals of the women's liberation movement, as well as the significance of her identity as American Jewish woman.

== Fictional character biography ==
Bernie Rosenthal is a glass blower, wrestling fanatic, and aspirant lawyer who is the proprietress of Rosenthal's Glass Menagerie in Greenwich Village. (Note: Captain America #271, 312) She encounters Steve Rogers after moving into his apartment building and the two quickly grow close, though she is unaware that he is secretly the superhero Captain America. (Note: Captain America #248) Bernie sympathizes with Steve after seeing a photo of his former girlfriend Sharon Carter, who at the time was believed to have died, (Note: Captain America #251) and eventually realizes she is falling in love with him. (Note: Captain America #253) The two begin dating, and though a series of misfire dates cause both Bernie and Steve to question their relationship, they assure each other they are in love. (Note: Captain America #267–270)

Bernie and Steve attend an anti-Nazi rally after a local synagogue is vandalized, where Bernie encounters her ex-husband Sammy Bernstein. The rally turns violent and Sammy is arrested, but the riot disperses after Captain America suddenly appears and manages to calm those assembled. Bernie quickly realizes that Steve and Captain America are one and the same, but accepts Steve's double life. (Note: Captain America #275–276) They later become engaged after Bernie proposes marriage, (Note: Captain America #292) but when a rent increase forces Bernie to close her glass shop (Note: Captain America #309) she applies and is accepted into the law program at the University of Wisconsin–Madison. (Note: Captain America #311–316) She departs New York on ambiguous terms with Steve, who moves back into Avengers Mansion; (Note: Captain America #317) the two grow distant and break off their engagement sometime thereafter. (Note: Captain America #327)

Eventually, Bernie graduates summa cum laude and becomes a successful lawyer, (Note: Captain America #380) and she and Steve remain on friendly terms. (Note: Captain America #385-386, 393-395) She later meets Steve's then-current girlfriend Rachel Leighton, and despite slight initial animosity as Bernie finds her feelings for Steve moderately reignited, the two become friends. (Note: Captain America #426–427) Bernie later acts as attorney for Steve's superhero partner Bucky Barnes, defending him against charges of treason for his actions as the brainwashed Winter Soldier. (Note: Captain America #600, 612)

== History and development ==
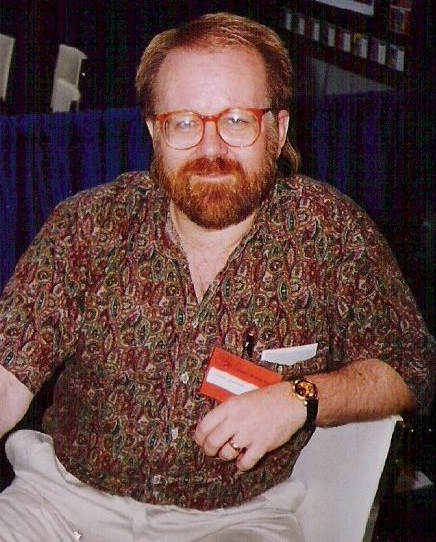
Bernie Rosenthal was created by writer Roger Stern (left, pictured 2010) and artist John Byrne (right, pictured 1992).

Bernie Rosenthal was created by writer Roger Stern and artist John Byrne, frequent collaborators who jointly worked on a range of comics including The Avengers and The X-Men. Stern said that he conceived of the character while writing for the first arc of his run on Captain America, which establishes a backstory for the supervillain Machinesmith, after realizing he had room in the script for a romance subplot. The character first appears in an unnamed cameo in the first issue of Byrne and Stern's run, Captain America #247 (April 1980), and makes their first named appearance in the subsequent issue.

The character assumed a more prominent role within Captain America after writer J.M. DeMatteis and artist Mike Zeck assumed authorship of the comic with issue 261 (September 1981). DeMatteis said that he "immediately understood and liked" the character, and that her relationship with Steve Rogers felt genuine "despite the superhero trappings". He noted how Stern and Byrne's run had treated Bernie's identity as an American Jewish woman as a matter of fact and said he sought to maintain her characterization as "not some 'New Yawk' Jewish trope" but "a real, three-dimensional woman who happened to be Jewish". Storylines involving Bernie written by DeMatteis would examine these subjects directly in plotlines that addressed neo-Nazism and antisemitism.

When Mark Gruenwald assumed authorship of Captain America with issue #307 (July 1985), he "wasted little time getting [Bernie] out of the book" and relegated the character to infrequent fleeting appearances before removing her entirely. The character has since made irregular minor appearances in Captain America, notably in the run of issues authored by Ed Brubaker in the late 2000s.

== Analysis ==
Media scholar J. Richard Stevens describes Bernie Rosenthal as a quintessential "strong female character" distinguished by how she "often takes the initiative in ways formerly reserved for male characters" in her relationship with Steve Rogers, from initiating their first kiss to proposing marriage before he does. He sees the character as personifying the ideals of "liberated womanhood", contrasting Captain America's relationships with the "shockingly timid" Sharon Carter and the "aggressive sexuality" of Rachel Leighton. Comics scholar Jason Dittmer notes that while Captain America's romantic relationships have been "mostly sexless" for the majority of his editorial history due to the restrictions of the Comics Code Authority, the tacit implication that Bernie and Steve's relationship was sexual represents a significant shift from Captain America's explicitly chaste romances of the pre-war era.

Dittmer notes how Steve's relationship with Bernie, like his other long-term romances in comics of the post-war era, is "generally devoid of conflict except that caused by his career" as a superhero. Stevens similarly considers how Steve's devotion to his duties as a superhero at the expense of his personal life in comics published in the 1980s mirrors stereotypes of the 1980s workaholic male, writing that Bernie acts as a "foil for reconciling Cap's mission with his personal life" and that Steve and Bernie ultimately experience "the quintessential 1980s breakup as competing occupational interests put too much distance between them to sustain their relationship".

Critics have remarked on Bernie Rosenthal's identity as a Jewish-American woman, with Stevens noting her as one of the "earliest and most significant" examples of a "nonstandard character" in Captain America alongside Falcon and Arnie Roth (notable as early African-American and gay characters in American comic books, respectively).
