= Normie Osborn =

Fictional character in Marvel Comics

- Normie Osborn as depicted in The Spectacular Spider-Man #184 (January 1992); Art by Sal Buscema.

Publication information
- Publisher: Marvel Comics
- First appearance: The Amazing Spider-Man #263 (April 1985)
- Created by: Bill Mantlo (writer); Al Milgrom (artist)

In-story information
- Full name: Norman Harold Osborn
- Place of origin: Manhattan, New York
- Team affiliations: MC2: New Warriors; Prime Earth: Alchemax, Avengers Academy
- Notable aliases: MC2: Green Goblin, Venom; Prime Earth: Goblin Childe, Red Goblin
- Abilities: As Green Goblin: Goblin-themed weapons and paraphernalia As Venom/Goblin Childe/Red Goblin: Possesses Spider-Man's powers Shapeshifting; Immunity to Spider-Man's spider-sense

Normie Osborn is a fictional character appearing in American comic books published by Marvel Comics. He is the grandson of Norman Osborn and the eldest son of Harry Osborn. After gaining part of Carnage's power and giving birth to a symbiote, Rascal, Normie becomes the second Red Goblin.

In the alternate future continuities of Spider-Girl and The Amazing Spider-Man: Renew Your Vows, Normie becomes the Green Goblin and romances Spider-Man's daughters Mayday Parker and Annie-May Parker, initially serving as a villain before being turned to the side of good and becoming Venom.

== Publication history ==
Normie Osborn first appeared in The Amazing Spider-Man #263 (April 1985), and was created by Bill Mantlo and Al Milgrom. He appeared in Green Goblin stories throughout the 1990s, generally portrayed as hating Spider-Man.

Osborn starred in the 2023 miniseries Red Goblin, which follows his exploits after bonding with the symbiote Rascal. Writer Alex Paknadel described Osborn as a child who is forced to take on adult responsibilities in looking after Rascal, a newborn symbiote and "clean slate" with little knowledge of the world or other symbiotes.

Osborn, as Red Goblin, appeared as a main character in the webcomic Avengers Academy: Marvel's Voices.

== Fictional character biography ==
Normie Osborn is the son of Harry Osborn and the grandson of Norman Osborn. After Harry dies from the effects of the Goblin formula, Normie bonds with Peter Parker, who becomes a sort of surrogate uncle to him. A trio of robotic "Goblin women" (one of a number of failsafes prepared by Harry before death) kidnap Normie, intending to turn him into a new Green Goblin. Spider-Man and Molten Man (Normie's uncle) defeat them before he can be exposed to the Goblin formula.

When Norman Osborn acquires the Carnage symbiote and transforms into the Red Goblin, Osborn attempts to gain his grandson Normie's aid by infusing a portion of the Carnage symbiote into Normie, turning into "Goblin Childe". Despite the symbiote amplifying Normie's jealousy of his half-brother Stanley, Normie throws off its influence when he witnesses his grandfather try to kill his parents, realizing in the process that the villain was actually his own grandfather and not Spider-Man. The symbiote fragment is subsequently separated from Normie while the main symbiote is apparently destroyed. However, it showed that some of the symbiote still remained in Normie's body.

=== Becoming the second Red Goblin ===
In the storyline Dark Web, it is revealed that part of the Carnage symbiote remained in Normie. He spawns a new symbiote, Rascal, who he bonds with to become the second Red Goblin. Normie secretly attends Avengers Academy without his family's notice, taking Miles Morales' invitation after Miles declines to attend the academy.

== Other versions ==
=== MC2 ===
Normie Osborn as the Green Goblin.

In the MC2 alternate future, Normie Osborn is an adult and blames Peter Parker for the death of his father and grandfather. Following the death of his mother, Normie has a mental breakdown, becoming the Green Goblin. Normie kidnaps Mayday Parker, who convinces him to receive treatment and forsake the Goblin identity.

=== The Amazing Spider-Man: Renew Your Vows ===
An alternate universe version of Normie Osborn appears in The Amazing Spider-Man: Renew Your Vows. This version inherited Oscorp at the age of ten after Harry Osborn's death.
