= Mohammad Yusuf Khan =

Mohammad Yusef Khan, and other spellings, may refer to:

- Muhammad Yousuf Khan or Dilip Kumar (1922–2021), Indian film actor
- Mohammad Yusuf Khan, father of Mohammad Nadir Shah, king of Afghanistan, 1929–1933
- Mohammad Yusuf (politician) (aka, Mohammad Yusuf Khan, 1917–98), prime minister and foreign minister of Afghanistan
- Muhammed Yusuf Khan or Maruthanayagam Pillai (1725–1764), Indian soldier and later commandant of British East India Company troops

== See also ==
- Yusuf Khan (disambiguation)
- Muhammad Khan (disambiguation)
- Mohammad Yousuf (disambiguation)
