= Ahmed Khan =

Ahmed Khan may refer to:

- Ahmed Khan bin Küchük (died 1481), Khan of the Great Horde between 1465 and 1481
- Ahmed Khan (choreographer) (born 1974), Indian choreographer, producer, actor, director and writer
- Ahmed Khan (cricketer) (born 2004), Pakistani cricketer
- Ahmed Khan (field hockey) (1912–1967), Indian field hockey player
- Ahmed Khan (footballer) (1926–2017), Indian footballer
- Ahmed Khan of Herat (fl. died 1857), ruler of Herat, Afghanistan
- Malik Ahmed Khan (before 1932 - after 1973), Pakistani cricket player and umpire
- Syed Ahmad Khan (1817–1898), Anglo–Indian Muslim philosopher, pragmatist, and social activist of nineteenth century India
- Ahmed Ali Khan (born 1977), Indian businessman and politician
- Ahmed Khan (politician), Pakistani politician
- Ahmed Zahur Khan (born 1918), Pakistani shot putter and discus thrower
- Ahmad Shah I (r. 1411–1442), born Ahmad Khan, ruler of the Gujarat Sultanate in India; founded the city of Ahmedabad
- Ahmad Shah III (r. 1554–1561), born Ahmad Khan, ruler of the Gujarat Sultanate
- Ahmet Khan, khan of the Kazakh Khanate
- Asad Ahmed Khan, a fictional character in the Indian soap opera Qubool Hai

== See also ==
- Ahmad Khan (disambiguation)
- Muhammad Ahmed Khan (disambiguation)
