= Muhammad Ahmed Khan =

Muhammad Ahmed Khan may refer to:

- Muhammad Ahmed Khan Kasuri (1903–1974), Pakistani judge
- Mohammed Ahmed Khan, a party to the landmark 1985 Supreme Court of India case Mohd. Ahmed Khan v. Shah Bano Begum

== See also ==
- Muhammad Khan (disambiguation)
- Ahmed Khan (disambiguation)
- Muhammad Ahmed (disambiguation)
