= Finesse (character) =

Jeanne Foucault Finesse
- Finesse battling her biological father Taskmaster.

Publication information
- Publisher: Marvel Comics
- First appearance: Avengers Academy #1 (June 2010)
- Created by: Christos Gage; Mike McKone

In-story information
- Alter ego: Jeanne Foucault
- Species: Human
- Team affiliations: Avengers Academy; G.I.R.L. A.I.M.
- Notable aliases: Finesse
- Abilities: Master martial artist and hand-to-hand combatant; Expert swordsman, marksman, and archer; Master assassin and tactician; Photographic reflexes; Eidetic memory; Voice mimicry

Jeanne Foucault is a character appearing in American comic books published by Marvel Comics. Created by writer Christos Gage and artist Mike McKone, the character first appeared in Avengers Academy #1 (June 2010). Foucault is known under the codename Finesse. She is the daughter of the supervillain Taskmaster. Like her father, she possesses photographic reflexes, allowing her to replicate any fighting style.

Finesse occupies a morally ambiguous space in the Marvel universe. In some of her appearances, she has been depicted as a frenemy to superhero Nadia Pym / The Wasp. She partnered with Striker during Infinity when they were chosen for the Contest of Champions. After her time at Avengers Academy, she joined A.I.M. to further develop her abilities, which led to a conflict with Nadia Van Dyne and her team. However, she later switched allegiances and worked alongside G.I.R.L. in Unstoppable Wasp.

== Publication history ==
Jeanne Foucault debuted in Avengers Academy #1 (June 2010), created by Christos Gage and Mike McKone. She was a regular character in the series through its final issue #39 (January 2013). She later appeared in the 2014 Inhumanity: The Awakening series.

== Fictional character biography ==
Finesse's parents were first believed to be criminals who trained under Taskmaster. Her abilities as a polymath manifested at a young age, which stunted her emotional growth and social abilities, making her very unsociable at times. She was approached by Norman Osborn and willingly began working for him.

Finesse is recruited into the Avengers Academy along with five other students who have been affected by Osborn. She figures out that she may be the biological daughter of Taskmaster, but all possible evidence has been deleted or sealed. They have a confrontation, but no straight answer, as Taskmaster's photographic reflexes affect his memory. As a result, he cannot remember if Finesse is his daughter.

Her ability to perceive even the slightest facial movements makes her a human lie detector. She is able to deduce that Jeremy Briggs, also a former Osborn torture victim, is trying to manipulate the students to quit the team and join his evil corporation.

Finesse became friends with X-23 due to their lack of emotion. However, their friendship took a turn for the worse when Jeremy Briggs tried to release a superhuman cure. After Briggs takes out X-23 and tries to burn her with acid, Finesse attacks Briggs with X-23's claws, causing him to bleed profusely. She begins to prepare a tourniquet for Briggs, but then changes her mind and lets him bleed to death. After learning that Finesse killed Briggs, X-23 agrees to keep the events secret, but declares they are no longer friends. Finesse remains with the Academy and is not concerned when Reptil and X-23 are kidnapped by Arcade. (Note: As depicted in the series Avengers Arena.)

Finesse is featured in the four-part series called Infinity: The Hunt. A friendly competition between various schools for super-powered teenagers turns serious when Thanos targets all of Earth's young super-beings. Finesse's new classmate 'Crimson' is murdered in the initial attack. The various schools work together to survive and bring the attack back to Thanos' forces.

Finesse is part of an A.I.M. team kidnapping G.I.R.L. from a scientific exhibition led by Nadia van Dyne, the current Wasp. A.I.M. had fooled their soldiers into believing that the attack, while violent, was ultimately intended to benefit Earth through forced defensive weaponry invention. The A.I.M. team is repelled, all members ultimately captured. Finesse, along with other A.I.M. soldiers, is allowed 'probation' by working with Wasp and the Avengers.

== Powers and abilities ==
Jeanne Foucault is a polymath with photographic reflexes, allowing her to comprehend complex systems and effortlessly replicate any physical action she observes. Whether mastering complex martial arts techniques or absorbing advanced scientific knowledge, she retains everything she has learned. Furthermore, Foucault's ability to perceive minute facial movements has enabled her to become a human lie-detector.

The similarity in this ability to Taskmaster's "photographic reflexes" has caused Foucault to suspect that Taskmaster may be her actual father, but after a confrontation with him, the suspicions remain unconfirmed. Taskmaster did alert her to the same problem he has faced with his abilities - that over time older memories become lost, overwritten as new skills are learned. This was in part shown to be a possibility in an alternate future where Foucault was only able to remember people by their movements.

== Reception ==
Matthew Meylikhov of Paste highlighted Jeanne Foucault, as a character with untapped potential. He noted that while Avengers Academy aimed to guide potential villains toward heroism, Finesse stood out as the one most likely to become a supervillain. Despite her aloof and dangerous demeanor, Meylikhov emphasized that Finesse possessed immense potential and could captivate audiences if given the opportunity to truly shine. Deirdre Kaye of Scary Mommy called Finesse a "role model" and a "truly heroic" female character.

Oliver VanDervoort of Game Rant described Foucault as an intriguing character. While she may not have the same widespread recognition as iconic heroes like Iron Man or Captain America, VanDervoort highlighted Finesse's unique abilities and complex backstory, which have earned her a dedicated fanbase. He noted that her character particularly appeals to readers who enjoy morally gray figures, making her stand out. Thomas Bacon of Screen Rant named Foucault one of the best new superheroes of the last decade. He described her as a fascinating character, a "shades-of-grey" superhero, who struggles with social situations but consistently demonstrates ruthless skill. Bacon emphasized that her complexity and abilities made her one of the most captivating characters in recent superhero comics.

== In other media ==
- Finesse appears as a playable character in Lego Marvel's Avengers.
- Jeanne Foucault / Finesse appears in Your Friendly Neighborhood Spider-Man, voiced by Anjali Kunapaneni. This version works with Daredevil, who assigned her to infiltrate Oscorp as an intern and spy on Norman Osborn on his behalf.
