= Mohammad Khan, Sistan and Baluchestan =

Mohammad Khan محمدخان
- Village
- Location within Iran
- Coordinates: 31°04′39″N 61°41′45″E
- Country: Iran
- Province: Sistan and Baluchestan
- County: Hirmand
- Bakhsh: Central
- Rural District: Dust Mohammad

Population (2006)
  - Total: 77
- Time zone: UTC+3:30 (IRST)
  - Summer (DST): UTC+4:30 (IRDT)

Mohammad Khan (Persian: محمدخان, also Romanized as Moḩammad Khān; also known as Golshāh Khān) is a village in Dust Mohammad Rural District, in the Central District of Hirmand County, Sistan and Baluchestan Province, Iran. At the 2006 census, its population was 77, in 18 families.
