= Ahmadkhan, Lorestan =

Ahmadkhan احمدخان
- Village
- Location within Iran
- Coordinates: 33°24′00″N 47°12′00″E
- Country: Iran
- Province: Lorestan
- County: Kuhdasht
- Bakhsh: Kunani
- Rural District: Zirtang

Population (2006)
  - Total: 50
- Time zone: UTC+3:30 (IRST)
  - Summer (DST): UTC+4:30 (IRDT)

Ahmadkhan (Persian: احمدخان, also Romanized as Aḩmadkhān; also known as Dom Tang) is a village in Zirtang Rural District, Kunani District, Kuhdasht County, Lorestan Province, Iran. At the 2006 census, its population was 50, in 9 families.
