= Avengers Academy =

Marvel Comics comic book series

- Cover to Avengers Academy #1 (June 2010). Art by Mike McKone.

Group publication information
- Publisher: Marvel Comics
- First appearance: Avengers Academy #1 (June 2010)

In-story information
- Type of organization: Team
- Agent(s): see below

Avengers Academy

Series publication information
- Schedule: Monthly
- Format: Ongoing series
- Genre: Superhero
- Publication date: June 2010 – November 2012
- Number of issues: 39, 1 special

Creative team
- Writer(s): Christos Gage; Paul Tobin
- Artist(s): Mike McKone
- Letterer(s): Clayton Cowles
- Colorist(s): Jeromy Cox
- Editor(s): Rachel Pinnelas; Joe Quesada; Bill Rosemann

Avengers Academy is a Marvel Comics American comic book series that debuted in June 2010 as part of the "Heroic Age", and concluded after thirty-nine issues in November 2012. The series was written by Christos Gage, with artwork by Mike McKone and tells the story of a group of young super-powered persons who were selected to join a training academy for the super-hero team, the Avengers.

Twelve years later in 2024, Avengers Academy receives a follow-up as part of Marvel's Voices spin-off title, Avengers Academy: Marvel's Voices.

== Publication history ==
Marvel announced the launch of Avengers Academy by the creative team of Christos Gage and Mike McKone in March 2010 by releasing a set of teaser images featuring students from the title. The first student to be revealed was Veil followed by Striker, Reptil, Mettle (under the name Fortress), Finesse, and Hazmat. The comic book was released in June 2010 and took over the spot in the publishing schedule left vacant by Avengers: The Initiative. The faculty were revealed the following month.

In June 2010, Marvel announced the series would cross over with Thunderbolts #147, which is bookended in the "Scared Straight" storyline featured in Avengers Academy #3 and 4.

In September 2010, Marvel teased that Giant Man would join the title starting in issue #7 in December 2010, suggesting that Hank Pym, then operating under the code name "Wasp", would don his former "Giant Man" guise again.

In March 2011, the title crossed over with The Amazing Spider-Man #661 and 662, which featured Spider-Man as a substitute teacher.

In May 2011, Marvel published Avengers Academy Giant Size #1, an 80-page one-shot by writer Paul Tobin and artist David Baldeon. Beginning that June, the series tied into the "Fear Itself" crossover storyline, from issues #15 - 20. The subsequent four issues tied into that crossover's epilogue storyline, "Shattered Heroes", during which the series' setting was relocated to the West Coast of the United States, and introduced new part-time and full-time students beginning in Avengers Academy #21 in November 2011, The part-time students include Spider-Girl, She-Hulk (Lyra), Power Man, Machine Teen, Batwing, Butterball, Wiz Kid, Juston Seyfert and his Sentinel (originally introduced in the series Sentinel), Thunderstrike, Rocket Racer, and members of the Loners. New members to the core class include White Tiger and Lightspeed. X-23 also became a regular cast member beginning in Avengers Academy #23. The Runaways visited the Avengers Academy in a two-part tale beginning in Avengers Academy #27 in March 2012.

In 2012 the series tied into the Avengers vs. X-Men storyline beginning with issue #31 (June 2012), in which the students face off against some of the younger X-Men characters and deal with the repercussions of the event. The series ended with issue #39 (November 2012).

== Plot ==
=== "Heroic Age" ===
In the wake of the 2008–2009 "Dark Reign" storyline, it was discovered that Norman Osborn had manipulated several young super-powered people for his own purposes. Six of these teens are placed in a program called the Avengers Academy located in the Infinite Avengers Mansion, headed by Hank Pym, with Tigra, Justice, Speedball, and Quicksilver as teachers. They say the purpose is to teach these youths how to become heroes. However, the students soon discover that they were selected because their profiles indicate they are the ones most likely to become villains. After finding out the truth, Finesse blackmails Quicksilver to teach her everything he was taught in the Brotherhood of Mutants threatening to expose the fact that he stole the Terrigen Crystals and not the Skrull imposter that he claimed to have committed the crime.

Pym takes the students to the Raft, the supervillain prison as a part of a tour. During the tour, Hazmat uses an EMP to shut down the prison. Hazmat, Mettle, and Veil locate Norman Osborn's cell to exact their revenge. Osborn however manipulates their emotions about the secrets Pym is keeping from them and convinces them that he can someday cure them of their individual maladies.

The students gain notoriety after they defeat Whirlwind. However it is revealed to Striker that his mother paid Whirlwind to stage the attack for publicity. Reptil is voted to be student leader but after a confrontation with Mentallo he loses control and nearly kills him. His teachers suggest he seek counseling but he refuses to talk to the faculty. They then set up a meeting with Jessica Jones who had similar issues, and Reptil finally opens about many of the things that have been troubling him, but keeps his concerns about his fellow students and the academy private.

Hank Pym finds a way to bring his late wife, Wasp, back to life. After some convincing and a battle with Absorbing Man, he decides against it because the risks are too great. Pym returns to his old Giant-Man persona as a way of letting go and moving on.

After video of the Hood assaulting Tigra goes viral, Hazmat, Veil and Striker track down Hood, now depowered, and torture him. Veil records the incident and the students upload the video in the same manner as Tigra's assault. When the students show Tigra the video she becomes furious and expels all those involved. Quicksilver helps Finesse seeks out Taskmaster believing him to be her biological father but is called back early to attend a faculty meeting to determine if Tigra's decision to expel Hazmat, Veil, and Striker was just. The teachers overturn the decision and instead place the students involved on probation. After the expelled students are readmitted, Speedball takes them all on a field trip to Stamford, Connecticut, to visit the memorial of the incident that started the Civil War. At the memorial, the group is attacked by the Cobalt Men which Speedball easily defeats using his Penance powers. Veil later sneaks into Pym's lab in order to find a way to help him bring Wasp back.

Veil soon finds that what seemed to be Wasp was in fact Carina, wife of Korvac. Korvac follows Carina back and the Avengers are summoned to fight him. With the Avengers soon defeated, Carina uses her powers to transform the students into adults. Carina tells the students that she has placed their consciousness in their adult bodies from possible futures. After the students defeat Korvac, they revert to their normal bodies with the exception of Reptil, who remains in his adult body from a possible future. On prom night at the Avengers Academy with members of the Young Allies and past members of the Initiative in attendance, Reptil still in his adult body dances with Komodo. When Hardball accuses Reptil of hitting on "his girl", a fight breaks out but is soon broken up by Pym and Speedball. After the fight Reptil speaks with Spider-Girl, who tells him that she liked him the way he was, and reverts to his teenage body.

While the adult Avengers are dealing with the eruption of Mount Etna, Tigra and the students learn that Electro has broken into a French lab. Once on the scene, the students discover that Electro is accompanied by the rest of the Sinister Six. The Sinister Six overpower the students and Doctor Octopus steals a device containing self-sustaining power. The team barely escapes before an explosion takes out the lab. Back at the academy, Pym then tells the students that he has failed to prepare them for such a fight and they will train harder as a result.

The students meet another young super-powered person that was manipulated by Norman Osborn named Jeremy Briggs. Since Osborn's defeat, Briggs has managed to become a billionaire. He shows the students several others teens tortured by Osborn, some of which have decided to use their powers to help people directly. When Finesse reveals that Briggs was telling lies and was using the teens for his own purposes, they attacked him. Briggs overpowers the students but ultimately lets them be taken out of his building by security stating that he could kill them if he wishes, but not today.

=== "Fear Itself" ===
During the 2011 "Fear Itself" storyline, Hank Pym, Quicksilver, Jocasta, and Justice head out to round up criminals who escaped from the Raft. Tigra and the students are dispatched to Washington DC to help fight Skadi and her mechanized soldiers. Pym is knocked down by Greithoth while Quicksilver and Justice are taken down by Skirn. After defeating the remaining soldiers, Tigra and the students return to the Academy when it is attacked by Skirn and Greithoth. The dimensional doors to the Academy are destroyed in the attack and the students become trapped with Skirn and Greithoth inside. The students use the Pym Particle generators to grow out of the subatomic underspace where the Academy resides. However Greithoth sabotages the generators causing the academy to grow with them, which threatens to crush an entire city if it grows to Earthspace. In order to prevent the Academy from crushing the city, the students come up with a plan to destroy it. Even though the plan works, Greithoth and Skirn escape. In the aftermath of the battle, Veil is angry that they were used in war, quits the Academy. Veil takes a job at Jeremy Briggs's chemical company to the dismay of the faculty and students. Speedball, now at peace with his past also decides to move on and return to his life as a full-time superhero with Justice. With the Infinite Avengers Mansion destroyed, Pym relocates the Academy to the former headquarters of the West Coast Avengers in Palos Verdes.

=== "Shattered Heroes" ===
With the arrival of new students at the academy, the original students fear that they are being replaced. After a confrontation with the faculty and other members of the Avengers, Captain America puts their fears at rest. Quicksilver discovers the body of Jocasta who appears to have been killed inside the academy during the commotion. Hank Pym invites the X-Men to the Academy to help investigate Jocasta's murder. A fight breaks out between Magneto and Quicksilver that involves the rest of the X-Men and the Academy. Once the investigation continues, Pym concludes that Jocasta's attacker must have come from outside the Academy possibly from another era or dimension. The Academy takes in Hybrid after being rescued from a firefight with the Purifiers but it is soon discovered that his intended goal is to establish himself as Wraithworld's king. Hybrid finds an ally in a future version of Reptil, who has taken over his past self's body in order to ensure that certain events occur to maintain his future's history. One of these events is Hybrid "murdering half the Academy"; to facilitate this, Reptil begins to lead students and faculty to Hybrid one by one so that he may feed off of their powers. However, Reptil has a change of heart and sends a distress signal to Veil, who returns with Jocasta, and together manage to banish Hybrid to another dimension. Jocasta reveals that she faked her death because she believes that the Academy is putting the students' lives at risk and has since joined up with Jeremy Briggs and Veil. Briggs then appears to recruit other students to his side but after an intense standoff the two sides come to a peaceful resolution; allowing the students to decide for themselves and to work together when necessary.

Shortly after, Striker holds a press conference to publicly announce his coming out. The Runaways use this as an opportunity to sneak onto the campus to convince Pym to help them find Old Lace, who was banished to a secret dimension. After they teleport to a prehistoric dimension and find Old Lace, Nico Minoru reveals that Pym intends to send the youngest Runaways to child protective services. A fight breaks out between the two teams, but is eventually settled after Nico casts a spell that allows everyone to understand each other and Pym agrees to let the Runaways leave on the condition that he is allowed to make periodical check ups.

=== "Avengers vs. X-Men" ===
During the 2012 "Avengers vs. X-Men" storyline, the Avengers bring the mutant children left behind by the X-Men following the battle on Utopia to the Avengers Academy to keep them from interfering in the war. Hercules organizes a sports competition between the Academy students and the mutants to ease tensions between the groups but after a while the mutants choose to exclude themselves. Meanwhile, Sebastian Shaw breaks out of the holding cell that Wolverine placed him in inside the Academy. Hercules, Tigra and Madison Jeffries try to stop Shaw, but are defeated. Meanwhile, X-23 tries to figure out whether she should align herself with her former friends from Utopia or her current friends at the Avengers Academy. After talking to Finesse, she witnesses the young mutants from Utopia (now joined by Ricochet, Wiz Kid, and Hollow) confronting the Academy students. When Juston Seyfert and his Sentinel try to stop the young mutants, X-23 attacks the robot and forces it to retreat, deciding that the young mutants should not be deprived of their free will to leave the Academy if they want. Shaw then suddenly appears in front of the teenagers. Before a battle begins, X-23 and Finesse warn their friends that Shaw's body language indicates that he does not mean to hurt anyone, but to help the mutant children to escape. After both sides agree that the mutant children should not be confined against their will, Tigra suggests to fake a fight in order to justify their escape in front of the cameras at the Academy. After the fake battle, Surge and Dust invite X-23 to join them, but she declines. The young mutants leave, except for Loa, who decides to stay at the Academy.

After the Phoenix Five (consisting of the Phoenix Force-empowered Cyclops, Colossus, Emma Frost, Magik, and Namor) return to Earth and start to reform the world, X-23 feels that Juston's Sentinel should be destroyed as it still has the directive to exterminate mutants. However, Juston argues that this directive is not its primary one and that it learned to overcome it. As Frost destroys Sentinels all over the world, she eventually arrives at the Academy and demands to either destroy the Sentinel or have its programming erased. Juston refuses arguing that it would be like erasing the individual that his Sentinel has become. Giant-Man, X-23 and the other students agree and defend the Sentinel against Frost. As the Academy staff and students fight Frost, both sides of the battle discuss the ethics in her attempt to destroy Juston's Sentinel. Finesse asks for Quicksilver's help, but he refuses, stating that Sentinels only exist as mutant-killing machines; nevertheless, instants after Frost destroys Juston's Sentinel, Quicksilver replaces its central processing core with the one from another robot, thus saving the Sentinel's "life" and memories. After Frost leaves the Academy, Giant-Man and Tigra announce that the Academy will be closed, to keep the students away from the war between Avengers and X-Men.

=== "Final Exam" ===
After the closure of the Academy, the students are summoned by Jeremy Briggs, proclaiming that he has found a cure. Veil reveals to the students that she has had her powers removed by Briggs' invention, called "Clean Slate". After Mettle and Hazmat take the cure, Briggs reveals his true intentions: to depower superhuman beings and re-disperse their abilities to individuals, whom he deems worthy. After defeating the depowered students with the help of the Young Masters, Briggs extends his offer to Hazmat, Mettle, Striker, and Veil, who accept. The depowered students regroup and manage to take down Big Zero. With the rest of Young Masters and Briggs, believing that they are dead, the depowered students make their way to Brigg's laboratory in search of an antidote. Meanwhile, Striker tricks the Enchantress into giving him the antidote and attacks her but is nearly killed by Briggs. During the commotion, Veil gives the antidote to Hazmat and Mettle. Hazmat rescues Striker but Briggs and the Enchantress escape. In the laboratory, the depowered students defeat Coat of Arms, just as Hazmat, Mettle, Striker, and Veil arrive with the antidote. The students make their way to the roof but find that Briggs as already launched "Clean Slate" via missiles. Lightspeed takes off after the missiles and disarms a couple as Veil tricks Briggs' scientists into releasing Jocasta so that she can redirect the rest. Meanwhile, during the battle between the rest of the students and Briggs and the Enchantress, the latter is injured and retreats while X-23 is knocked unconscious. Finesse uses X-23's claws to stab Briggs and allows him to bleed to death.

Back at the Academy, the faculty organizes an intramural football game between the Avengers Academy and the Jean Grey School for Higher Learning, and some of the Academy students are promoted to be associate level Avengers while continuing their training at the Academy.

== Characters ==
=== Faculty ===
Character	Real Name	Joined in	Notes
Giant-Man	Hank Pym	Avengers Academy #1 (June 2010)	Headmaster
Tigra	Greer Grant Nelson	Avengers Academy #1 (June 2010)	
Quicksilver	Pietro Django Maximoff	Avengers Academy #1 (June 2010)	
Justice	Vance Astrovik	Avengers Academy #1 (June 2010)	Left the Academy in Avengers Academy #20 (October 2011)
Speedball	Robbie Baldwin	Avengers Academy #1 (June 2010)	Left the Academy in Avengers Academy #20 (October 2011)
Jocasta		Avengers Academy #1 (June 2010)	Left the Academy in Avengers Academy #21 (November 2011), returns in Avengers Academy #38 (October 2012)
Hawkeye	Clinton Francis Barton	Avengers Academy #21 (November 2011)	
Captain Marvel	Carol Danvers	Marvel's Voices Infinity Comic #100 (May 2024)	Headmistress

=== Guest instructors ===
Character	Real Name	Appeared in	Notes
Iron Fist	Danny Rand	Avengers Academy #3 (October 2010)	
Valkyrie	Brunnhilde	Avengers Academy #3 (October 2010)	
Captain America	Steve Rogers	Avengers Academy #5 (December 2010)	
Doctor Strange	Stephen Strange	Avengers Academy #10 (May 2011)	
Protector	Noh-Varr	Avengers Academy #10 (May 2011)	
Spider-Man	Peter Parker	Amazing Spider-Man #661 (July 2011)	
Hercules		Avengers Academy #29-31 (May–June 2012)	
Mister Fantastic	Reed Richards	Avengers Academy: Marvel's Voices Infinity Comics #1 (June 2024)	
Jeff the Land Shark		Avengers Academy: Marvel's Voices Infinity Comics #1 (June 2024)	
Black Panther	T'Challa	Avengers Academy: Marvel's Voices Infinity Comics #1 (June 2024)	
She-Hulk	Jennifer Walters	Avengers Academy: Marvel's Voices Infinity Comics #1 (June 2024)	
Wiccan	Billy Kaplan	Avengers Academy: Marvel's Voices Infinity Comics #1 (June 2024)	
Shuri		Avengers Academy: Marvel's Voices Infinity Comics #1 (June 2024)	
Manifold	Eden Fesi	Avengers Academy: Marvel's Voices Infinity Comics #1 (June 2024)	
Nightcrawler	Kurt Wagner	Avengers Academy: Marvel's Voices Infinity Comics #1 (June 2024)	
Colossus	Piotr Rasputin	Avengers Academy: Marvel's Voices Infinity Comics #4 (July 2024)	
Wolverine	Logan	Avengers Academy: Marvel's Voices Infinity Comics #4 (July 2024)	
Wasp	Janet van Dyne	Avengers Academy: Marvel's Voices Infinity Comics #13 (September 2024)	
Valkyrie	Rūna	Avengers Academy: Marvel's Voices Infinity Comics #13 (September 2024)	
Jean Grey		Avengers Academy: Marvel's Voices Infinity Comics #14 (September 2024)	
Iceman	Bobby Drake	Avengers Academy: Marvel's Voices Infinity Comics #15 (October 2024)	-

=== Students ===
Character	Real Name	Joined in	Notes
Finesse	Jeanne Foucault	Avengers Academy #1 (June 2010)	
Hazmat	Jennifer Takeda	Avengers Academy #1 (June 2010)	Left the Academy in Avengers Undercover #1 (March 2014), returns as a resident assistant in Avengers Academy: Marvel's Voices Infinity Comic #16 (October 2024)
Mettle	Ken Mack	Avengers Academy #1 (June 2010)	Presumed killed in Avengers Arena #1 (December 2012), revealed to be alive in Avengers Academy: Marvel's Voices Infinity Comic #18 (October 2024), returns as a resident assistant in Avengers Academy: Marvel's Voices Infinity Comic #20 (November 2024)
Reptil	Humberto Lopez	Avengers Academy #1 (June 2010)	Student leader
Striker	Brandon Sharpe	Avengers Academy #1 (June 2010)	
Veil	Madeline Berry	Avengers Academy #1 (June 2010)	Left the Academy in Avengers Academy #20 (October 2011), returns in Avengers Academy #38 (October 2012), leaves again in Avengers Academy #39 (November 2012)
Batwing	James Santini	Avengers Academy #21 (November 2011)	
Butterball	Emery Schaub	Avengers Academy #21 (November 2011)	
Hollow		Avengers Academy #21 (November 2011)	
Juston Seyfert		Avengers Academy #21 (November 2011)	
Lightspeed	Julie Power	Avengers Academy #21 (November 2011)	Teacher's assistant
Machine Teen	Adam Aaronson	Avengers Academy #21 (November 2011)	Left the Academy in Avengers Academy #26 (February 2012)
Power Man	Victor Alvarez	Avengers Academy #21 (November 2011)	
Ricochet	Johnny Gallo	Avengers Academy #21 (November 2011)	
Rocket Racer	Robert Farrell	Avengers Academy #21 (November 2011)	Left the Academy in Avengers Academy #26 (February 2012)
She-Hulk	Lyra	Avengers Academy #21 (November 2011)	
Spider-Girl	Anya Corazon	Avengers Academy #21 (November 2011)	
Thunderstrike	Kevin Masterson	Avengers Academy #21 (November 2011)	
Turbo	Michiko "Mickey" Musashi	Avengers Academy #21 (November 2011)	
White Tiger	Ava Ayala	Avengers Academy #21 (November 2011)	
Wiz Kid	Taki Matsuya	Avengers Academy #21 (November 2011)	
Hybrid	Jimmy Marks	Avengers Academy #23 (December 2011)	Banished from Earth in Avengers Academy #25 (February 2012)
X-23	Laura Kinney	Avengers Academy #23 (December 2011)	
Loa	Alani Ryan	Avengers Academy #31 (August 2012)	
Bloodline	Brielle Brooks	Marvel's Voices Infinity Comic #100 (May 2024)	
Captain America	Aaron Fischer	Marvel's Voices Infinity Comic #100 (May 2024)	
Escapade	Shela Sexton	Marvel's Voices Infinity Comic #100 (May 2024)	
Kid Juggernaut	"Justin" Jin Joon-Sung	Marvel's Voices Infinity Comic #100 (May 2024)	
Moon Girl	Lunella Lafayette	Marvel's Voices Infinity Comic #100 (May 2024)	
Red Goblin	Norman Harold "Normie" Osborn	Marvel's Voices Infinity Comic #100 (May 2024)	
Blackheart		Avengers Academy: Marvel's Voices Infinity Comics #27 (December 2024)	

== In other media ==
Finesse, Hazmat, Reptil, Striker, Veil, Butterball, and White Tiger appear as unlockable playable characters in Lego Marvel's Avengers. White Tiger is voiced by Caitlyn Taylor Love, reprising the role from Ultimate Spider-Man.

== Collected editions ==
Title	Material Collected	Publication Date	ISBN
Avengers Academy Volume 1: Permanent Record	Avengers Academy #1-6 and material from Enter the Heroic Age	January 26, 2011	0785144943
Avengers Academy Volume 2: Will We Use This in the Real World?	Avengers Academy #7-13	June 15, 2011	078514496X
Avengers Academy: Arcade - Death Game	Avengers Academy Giant-Size #1, Marvel Team-Up #89, and Spider-Man #25	August 31, 2011	0785156305
Fear Itself: Avengers Academy	Avengers Academy #14-20, 14.1	March 21, 2012	0785152008
Avengers Academy Volume 3: Second Semester	Avengers Academy #21-28	April 25, 2012	0785152024
Avengers vs. X-Men: Avengers Academy	Avengers Academy #29-33	March 26, 2013	978-0785165811
Avengers Academy Volume 4: Final Exams	Avengers Academy #34-39	January 29, 2013	978-0785160311
Avengers Academy: The Complete Collection Vol. 1	Avengers Academy #1-12, Avengers Academy Giant-Size #1, Thunderbolts #147 and material from Enter the Heroic Age	March 13, 2018	978-1302909468
Avengers Academy: The Complete Collection Vol. 2	Avengers Academy #13-20, 14.1; material from Amazing Spider-Man (vol. 1) #661-662, Fear Itself: The Home Front #1-7, Avengers: Solo #1-5	May 8, 2018	978-1302909451
Avengers Academy: The Complete Collection Vol. 3	Avengers Academy #21-39	April 6, 2021	978-1302923143
