= Anthony Oliveira =

Canadian author, journalist and pop culture critic

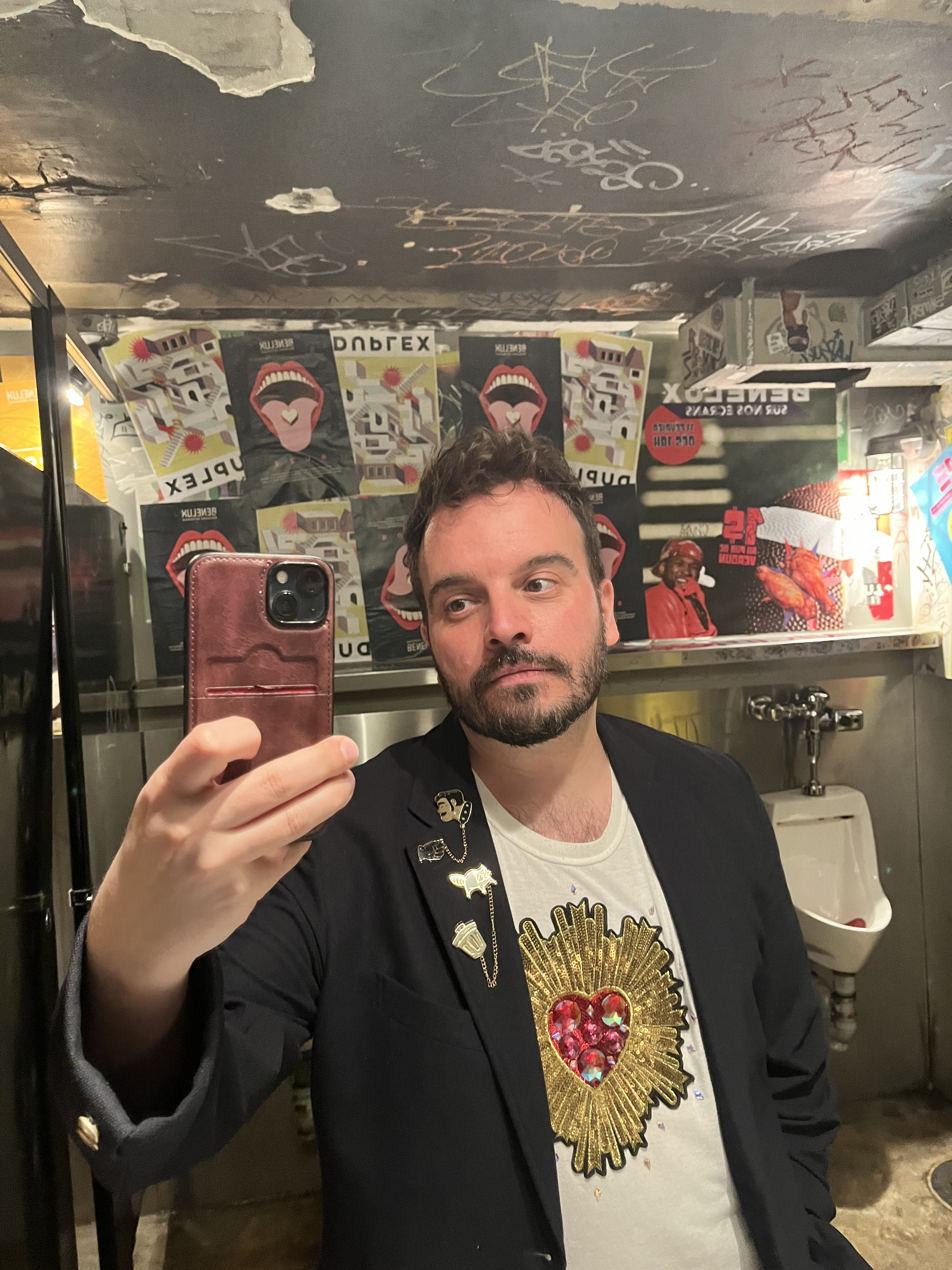
- Oliveira in 2024
- Education: University of Toronto
- Occupations: Author, journalist and pop culture critic
- Website: anthonyoliveira.com

Anthony Oliveira (IPA: /ˌɒlɪvˈeɪrə/, O-liv-AY-ruh) is a Canadian author, journalist and pop culture critic. He is the winner of multiple GLAAD Media Awards and National Magazine Awards for his prose, comics, and journalism, which often focus on the intersection of queerness, Christianity, and culture.

He is the author of the 2024 international bestselling novel Dayspring, which won the 2024 Dayne Ogilvie Prize for LGBTQ Emerging Writers. He has also written comics for Marvel Comics and Steven Universe, among others, and is the creator and ongoing writer of Avengers Academy: Marvel's Voices. His prose work has been published in The Washington Post, Fangoria, StarTrek.com, Hazlitt and many others.

Oliveira is an academic with a PhD in 17th century literature and is a former employee of the Glad Day Bookshop, the world's oldest surviving LGBT bookstore and event space, whose community he cites as a major influence in his work.

== Career ==
=== Academia and journalism ===
Oliveira received his PhD from the University of Toronto in 2017, with a thesis entitled "Exit the King: Sovereignty and Subjectivity in the English Baroque". As a graduate student, he won the Ruth E. and Harry E. Carter/Ontario Graduate Scholarship in the Faculty of Arts and Science for 2014–15.

Oliveira covered the 2010–2017 serial killings of queer men in Toronto by murderer Bruce McArthur for multiple outlets and was the courtroom reporter during the trial for queer publication Xtra Magazine. His piece, "Death in the Village", which sketched life in Toronto's queer community during the trial and under escalating police brutality against LGBTQ+ people in the city, subsequently won two National Media Awards Foundation National Magazine Awards (for Long-form Feature, and Essay). Oliveira has been an outspoken critic of the Toronto Police and their failure to protect the queer community, particularly in relation to the McArthur killings.

Oliveira's writing has covered events such as the death and legacy of filmmaker Joel Schumacher and topics such as LGBTQ Pride Month and the COVID-19 pandemic.

After acquiring his PhD, Oliveira worked for the Glad Day Bookshop, the oldest surviving LGBT bookstore, which he cites as a major influence on his work.

=== Pop culture critic ===
Oliveira founded the Dumpster Raccoon Cinema film program at Toronto's Revue Cinema in July 2018, with the goal to "forage through our culture trash to figure out what it is, how it works, why we discarded it, what it can teach us". The series has included cult films such as Mommy Dearest and Death Becomes Her, film classics such as Sunset Boulevard and Batman: Mask of the Phantasm, and multiple sold-out screenings of the 2019 "cult classic" Cats, featuring drag performances and video pre-shows. The series has been repeatedly included among Toronto highlights by Now magazine.

Oliveira has been a frequent guest on podcasts, appearing to discuss pop culture ranging from the X-Men on podcasts such as Cerebro and Greymalkin Lane to Buffy the Vampire Slayer to Frasier, as well as classical literature such as Paradise Lost. Notably, Oliveira has appeared with Julia Lewald and Eric Lewald, creators of X-Men: The Animated Series, and Lenore Zann, former Canadian MP and the voice of Rogue, to discuss the X-Men TV series, and alongside Trixie Mattel to discuss Buffy the Vampire Slayer.

In 2023, Oliveira organized the Pride programming for Hollywood Suite, choosing over 30 important queer films as "a small capsule summary of the last few decades of queer film". He has appeared multiple times on Hollywood Suite's podcast A Year in Film, discussing films such as Batman: Mask of the Phantasm, Jesus Christ Superstar and Godspell, and others.

In 2020, Oliveira hosted a conversation with Rufus Wainwright, playwright Daniel MacIvor, and director Peter Hinton accompanying Wainwright's opera Hadrian at the Canadian Opera Company.

=== On-screen performance ===
In 2018 and 2019, Oliveira co-hosted the red carpet for the Toronto International Film Festival, interviewing stars such as Chris Pine, Susan Sarandon, Sam Neill, and others. Oliveira has hosted multiple events for TIFF, including their 2023 and 2024 Oscars parties. Oliveira made his on-screen movie debut in the movie Erin's Guide to Kissing Girls, playing Bret, a comic book store clerk.

=== The Devil's Party ===
Since March 2018, Oliveira has published The Devil's Party, a podcast in which takes a "book-club style reading" to "help first-timers and experts alike in catching the weird magic of these important and influential texts". Oliveria has covered such texts as Paradise Lost, Paradise Regained, the Gospels of Mark and John, and the Revelation of John, with each reading from the text followed by an episode of his own commentary and an episode responding to reader questions submitted by subscribers to his Patreon.

Starting in April 2023 with the Revelation of John, Oliveira's commentary The Devil's Party has been available for free on podcast networks such as Spotify and Apple Podcasts, while the reader commentary episodes remain available to Patreon subscribers. The Devil's Party was the inaugural podcast for the Affirming Connections’ Spiritual Podcast club.

=== Comics ===
Oliveira has written for a number of major comics lines and characters, including Marvel Comics' Captain Marvel, the Young Avengers, and the X-Men, as well as Steven Universe. Oliveira's works have been described by comics reviewers as "rewarding, fun, and heartfelt", with Oliveira described as "a thoughtful writer" with "a deft hand".

He was the creator and writer of Avengers Academy: Marvel's Voices (May 2024 – September 2025), for which he created the Korean-Canadian character "Justin" Jin Joon-Sung, the Kid Juggernaut, a character praised by fans and critics for addressing the orientalism in superhero comics.

Oliveira's comics have won multiple awards, including 3 GLAAD Media Awards: the 2021 award for Outstanding Comic Book for Lords of Empyre: Emperor Hulkling, the 2023 award for Outstanding Graphic Novel or Anthology for Young Men in Love, which also won the Gayming Magazine Best LGBTQ Comic Book Moment Award, and the 2026 award for Outstanding Comic Book for Avengers Academy: Marvel's Voices. Emperor Hulkling #1 (with Chip Zdarsky) was named a "Best Single Issue (One-Shot or Otherwise)" by AIPT Comics in 2020 and included by Syfy.com among the best comics of 2020.

Oliveira's first graphic novel Apocrypha was published by Harper Teen in 2024.

=== Prose writing ===
Oliveira's debut novel Dayspring was published in April 2024 by Strange Light Press (a division of Penguin Random House). Dayspring was one of the most anticipated books of 2024 by GQ and the Toronto Star, was ranked one of the best books of 2024 by The Globe and Mail, and was included in Indigo's Top 100 Best Books of 2024. The book is based on Oliveira's 2019 short story of the same name, published in Hazlitt, which won the 2020 National Magazine Award for fiction. The book became an international bestseller and garnered critical acclaim in both popular and academic media.

Dayspring was the winner of the 2024 Writers Trust Dayne Ogilvie Prize for LGBTQ Emerging Writers.

Oliveira's short story, "An Incident at Exeter", was adapted into a podcast by Pseudopod. Oliveira was a guest judge for Event magazine's 2019 non-fiction contest.

His short story, "Ganymede", described by the publisher as "an epic poem space opera choose your own adventure", appears in the queer sci-fi/fantasy anthology I Want That Twink Obliterated by Bona Books.

== Personal life ==
Oliveira is queer and is deaf in his right ear. He grew up in an Azorean Portuguese family in Toronto, attending St. Michael's College School. As of 2024, Oliveira continues to live in Toronto.
