= Mohammad Khan, South Khorasan =

Mohammad Khan محمدخان
- Village
- Location within Iran
- Coordinates: 31°52′48″N 59°55′04″E
- Country: Iran
- Province: South Khorasan
- County: Nehbandan
- Bakhsh: Shusef
- Rural District: Shusef

Population (2006)
  - Total: 47
- Time zone: UTC+3:30 (IRST)
  - Summer (DST): UTC+4:30 (IRDT)

Mohammad Khan (Persian: محمدخان, also Romanized as Mohammed Khān; also known as Kalāteh-ye Moḩammad Khān, Kalāt-e Mohammad Khān, and Qalāteh Muhammad Khān) is a village in Shusef Rural District, Shusef District, Nehbandan County, South Khorasan Province, Iran. At the 2006 census, its population was 47, in 9 families.
