= List of Marvel Comics characters: K =

== Kala ==
Kala is the queen of the Netherworld, which was once a city on the continent of Atlantis enclosed in an airtight dome. When Atlantis sank, Netheria remained intact. Its people renamed their kingdom the Netherworld, and themselves Netherworlders. Kala seeks to conquer the surface world, but relents after finding that she ages rapidly on the surface. Kala is returned to the Netherworld, which restores her youth.

Kala plans to gain control of Mole Man's realm in Subterranea by pretending to be infatuated with him. Mole Man had captured his greatest rival for rulership, Tyrannus, who Kala ends up falling in love with. Kala frees Tyrannus from the control of Mole Man, who learns that she has deceived him. However, Tyrannus turns against Kala and imprisons her. After escaping, Kala becomes Mole Man's consort out of desperation, having been spurned by Tyrannus. Kala attempts to win Mole Man's love, but he rejects her, stating that obsession is not the same thing as love.

== Kamran ==
Kamran was created by G. Willow Wilson and Takeshi Miyazawa and first appeared in Ms. Marvel (vol. 3) #13 (March 2015).

Kamran is a young Pakistani American who discovers his Inhuman heritage after being exposed to the Terrigen Mists which grants him bio-luminescent abilities. After moving from Houston to Jersey City, Kamran is reintroduced to Kamala Khan whose parents are friends with his, and the two quickly bond over their shared interests. After witnessing Kamala change into her alter ego, Ms. Marvel, Kamran reveals his secret to her, which makes her smitten with him. Kamran offers Kamala a ride to school, but instead of taking her to school, he kidnaps her and takes her to his boss, the Inhuman crime boss Lineage who hopes to recruit Ms. Marvel into his gang. Ms. Marvel fights off Kamran and Lineage and escape from them. Desperate to prove himself to Lineage, Kamran kidnaps Kamala's brother Aamir and exposes him to stolen Terrigen Mists, which awaken his Inhuman ability to create psychic shields.

Sometime later, Kamran approaches Ms. Marvel, apologizing for his actions, and attempts to reconcile with her. They are interrupted by Shang-Chi, who reveals that Kamran had stolen the mystical Eyes of the Dragon from the Five Weapons Society and was planning on using them to steal Ms. Marvel's life force to empower Lineage. Ms. Marvel, Shang-Chi, and the Five Weapons Society apprehend Kamran and recover the Eyes.

Kamran's body emits brilliant blue-white energy. Using the energy stored within his body, Kamran can channel that energy by expelling it as a discharge or transferring the energy into an object causing it to glow and then explode.

=== Kamran in other media ===
Kamran appears in Ms. Marvel (2022), portrayed by Rish Shah. This version is a Jinn, a member of the Clandestine, and the son of the group's leader Najma.

== Kaorak ==
Kaorak is a living landmass that was previously part of Arakko before being animated via mutant magic cast by Apocalypse. Using a magic circle with the Amenthi Daemon Orc representing air, Sunfire (at the time bonded with Redroot the Forest) representing earth, Vulcan representing fire, Apocalypse himself representing water, and Storm as a focal point for the magic itself, Apocalypse raises Kaorak, the "island that walks like a mutant", to end the civil war on Arakko. Genesis raises Arakko in turn and the two "siblings" battle. After Storm destroys the Annihilation Staff and frees Genesis from its corrupting influence, the war ends and Kaorak and Arakko embrace.

== Karl Fiers ==
Karl Fiers, also known as The Finisher, is a Marvel Comics supervillain and assassin best known for murdering Peter Parker’s parents. Created by Stan Lee and Larry Lieber, the character first appeared in The Amazing Spider-Man Annual #5 in 1968.

Working under the orders of Albert Malik, Fiers discovered that Richard and Mary Parker were CIA agents. He sabotaged their airplane with a timed bomb to kill them and framed the couple as double agents.

Fiers mentored and trained Dmitri Smerdyakov, the supervillain known as the Chameleon.

Years later, Spider-Man tracked Fiers down to Algeria to clear his parents' names. During their battle, Spider-Man deflected a heat-seeking missile launched from Fiers's limousine back at the villain. Before seemingly dying in the blast, Fiers confessed to the murders and confirmed the Parkers' innocence.

Return and Family. Fiers later revealed he had survived the explosion and contacted Peter’s sister, Teresa Parker, via hologram to manipulate her into retrieving a device called the Clairvoyant. He is also the brother of Gustav Fiers (The Gentleman), an affluent criminal mastermind who later organized a version of the Sinister Six.

== Karn ==
- First appearance: The Superior Spider-Man #32 (September 2014)
- Created by: Dan Slott, Christos N. Gage, Giuseppe Camuncoli
- Species: Psychic vampire (formerly); Spider-Totem
- Teams: Inheritors; Web Warriors
- Abilities: Superhuman strength, speed, reflexes and durability; Extended longevity; Life Absorption Touch; Reality Manipulation
- Aliases: Master Weaver
- Further reading: Karn at the Comic Book DB (archived from the original); Karn at the Grand Comics Database

Karn is a member of the Inheritors from the Spider-Verse storyline who wanders the Multiverse to slay Spider Totems. He first appeared in The Superior Spider-Man #32 (September 2014), and was created by Dan Slott, Christos N. Gage, and Giuseppe Camuncoli.

During the hunt against Master Weaver, he hesitates to deliver the finishing blow, leading to the death of his mother. As a result, he is condemned to wear a mask by his father Solus, and exiled to hunt Spider Totems to earn his place back in the family.

The time-displaced Superior Spider-Man (Otto Octavius's mind in Peter Parker's body) later discovered Karn. Assembling an army of Spider-Men, the Superior Spider-Man and his team ambushed Karn while hunting the Spider-Man of Earth-2818, but despite Karn continuing to gain the upper hand, the Spider-Men only escaped when two of Karn's estranged siblings showed up and began fighting. Karn later joins the Spider-Men in their fight against the Inheritors.

Karn realizes that Master Weaver is his future self. He establishes a new team of multiversal spider-heroes called the Warriors of the Great Web, consisting of Mayday Parker, Spider-Ham, Spider-Man Noir, Spider-Man India, and Spider-Gwen.

During the "Spider-Geddon" storyline, Karn is killed by Verna.

=== Powers and abilities of Karn ===
Like the rest of the Inheritors, Karn can drain life force through physical contact. Depending on the power of the individual he drains, his powers and vitality can increase substantially. He also has superhuman strength, speed, reflexes, and durability. He has a staff that emits a unique energy signature capable of vaporizing people.

As the Master Weaver, Karn threads the Web of Life and Destiny, gaining dominion over various realities. He can open portals at his command or alter realities.

=== Karn in other media ===
- Karn appears as a boss in Spider-Man Unlimited, voiced by Matthew Mercer.
- Karn appears as a boss in Marvel: Avengers Alliance.
- Karn appears as a non-playable character (NPC) in Marvel Rivals, voiced by Andrew Kishino.

== Karnilla ==
Karnilla the Norn Queen is a sorceress and the Queen of Nornheim (one of the Asgardian provinces). She has been depicted as an enemy of Asgard, an ally of Loki, and love interest of Balder the Brave.

In her debut appearance, Karnilla saves Balder from being assassinated by Loki, justifying this action by saying that, like everything that existed in Asgard (with the exception of mistletoe) she had promised to protect Balder. However, Karnilla is rejected by Balder, who had given up his career as a warrior after returning from the dead. Undaunted, she abducts Balder and his new beloved, Nanna. Karnilla forces Balder to agree to marry her, in order to save Nanna's life.

=== Powers and abilities of Karnilla ===
Karnilla is a member of the race of superhumans known as Asgardians, giving her superhuman strength, speed, stamina, durability, agility, and reflexes. She also possesses additional powers through her manipulation of the forces of magic, including the enchantment of physical and sensory abilities, physical malleability, temporary paralysis or sleep, inter-dimensional teleportation, energy projection and deflection, elemental conversion, and illusion-casting. She can even cast permanent spells interdimensionally with no significant preparation or effort.

Karnilla possesses vast knowledge of magical spells and enchantments of Asgardian origin, granting her skills that have been described as equal to those of Loki, or surpassed only by Odin among Asgardians.

=== Karnilla in other media ===
- Karnilla appears in The Avengers: Earth's Mightiest Heroes episode "This Hostage Earth", voiced by Kari Wahlgren.
- Karnilla appears in Thor & Loki: Blood Brothers, voiced by Phoebe Stewart.

== Vasily Karpov ==
Vasily Karpov is a character appearing in American comic books published by Marvel Comics. The character first appeared in Captain America (vol. 5) #5 (March 2005), and was created by Ed Brubaker and Michael Lark.

An officer of Soviet Russia during World War II, Karpov was the handler of the Winter Soldier and mentor of Aleksander Lukin and Red Guardian.

=== Vasily Karpov in other media ===
Vasily Karpov appears in media set in the Marvel Cinematic Universe (MCU).

- He first appears in the film Captain America: Civil War, portrayed by Gene Farber. This version is a member of Hydra who was primarily active in the early 1990s. He was the person who caused the assassination of Howard and Maria Stark by activating a mind-control formula injected into the Winter Soldier that gets him to obey whatever a person—who activates it—wants. In 2016, Karpov is interrogated and killed by Helmut Zemo for information about the Winter Soldier.
- An alternate universe version of Karpov appears in the What If...? episode "What If... the Red Guardian Stopped the Winter Soldier?", voiced by Gene Farber.

== Karthon the Quester ==
Karthon the Quester

Publication information
- Publisher: Marvel Comics
- First appearance: Sub-Mariner #9 (Jan 1969)
- Created by: Roy Thomas (Writer); Marie Severin (Artist)

Karthon the Quester is a character appearing in American comic books published by Marvel Comics.

=== Publication history ===
Karthon first appeared in Sub-Mariner #9 (January 1969), and was created by Roy Thomas and Marie Severin. The character subsequently appears in Sub-Mariner #12–13 (April–May 1969), #32 (December 1970), and #36 (April, 1976).

=== Fictional character biography ===
Karthon is a member of the scaly-skinned subspecies of Homo mermanus called Lemurians. He served Naga as the foremost of his "Questers", searching on behalf of the undersea kingdom of Lemuria to retrieve the legendary Serpent Crown, which had been lost beneath the sea by Paul Destine. Namor found the Crown at the same time as Karthon. The two fought over the Serpent Crown. Karthon told Namor that the Crown would allow the Lemurians to conquer the world, but Namor revealed to Karthon that the Crown was actually a vessel empowered by the demonic Elder God Set. As the two fought, Captain Barracuda and his crew inadvertently captured them in an electrified net. Namor broke free and fought Barracuda's forces, while Karthon took the Serpent Crown and fled back towards Lemuria.

Namor managed to catch up with Karthon and the two continued to fight over it until Karthon subdued Namor and subverted his will. The two traveled to Lemuria, where Karthon returned the Serpent Crown to Naga. Naga ordered Namor's death, and when Karthon refused to murder him, Naga struck Karthon down using the Serpent Crown and sent the other Questers to attack Namor. Namor collapsed the royal chamber over Naga's throne. Karthon tried to hold back the vengeful Namor, who tossed both Karthon and the other Questers aside. Karthon asked Naga to stay his hand against Namor, and Naga instead obliterated the other Questers. The despondent Karthon asked Naga to destroy him as well, but Naga wished to keep Karthon as his enforcer. When Naga caused the death of Karthon's sister Llyna, Karthon became enraged by this final betrayal and slew Naga from behind with his sword. Karthon nearly fell to the evil call of the Serpent Crown, but Namor placed the Crown on Naga's corpse, which was then pulled into a great fissure which opened in the ocean floor. The Lemurians proclaimed Karthon their new king, and he accepted, vowing to end Lemuria's history of despotic rulers. Karthon's rule is wise and just, and the Lemurians became allies of the Atlanteans.

== Kazann ==
Kazann is a character appearing in American comic books published by Marvel Comics. Created by Garth Ennis and Clayton Crain, and first introduced in Ghost Rider: Road to Damnation #1 (November 2005).

Kazann is a demon who has found a way to bring Hell to the world, opposed by the angel Malachi and Ghost Rider.

== Ka-Zar ==
Ka-Zar is the name of two characters appearing in American comic books published by Marvel Comics.

== Keep ==
Keep is a character appearing in American comic books published by Marvel Comics.

After Donald Blake was beheaded by Enchantress, she transformed his body into a creature called Keep. He accompanied Enchantress and Donald Blake's living head through Hel where Enchantress persuaded Hela to let them out of Hel. They were defeated by Thor.

Keep was still by Enchantress' side when Executioner returned from the dead. They learn that Roxxon Energy Corporation bought the fictional version of Marvel Comics causing Enchantress to turn Keep into a version of Thor, wielding a replicant Mjolnir created by Roxxon.

== Kelpie ==
Kelpie is a member of the UK superhero team The Union. Kelpie represents Scotland in the team. She has the power to control water, as well as being able to transform her hands into sharp claws.

== Aamir Khan ==
Aamir Khan is a character appearing in American comic books published by Marvel Comics.

Aamir Khan is the son of Muneeba and Yusuf Khan and the older brother of Kamala Khan.

=== Aamir Khan in other media ===
Aamir Khan appears in media set in the Marvel Cinematic Universe (MCU), portrayed by Saagar Shaikh. This version is married to Tyesha Hillman.

== Muneeba Khan ==
Muneeba Khan is a character appearing in American comic books published by Marvel Comics. Muneeba first appeared in All-New Marvel Now! Point One #1 (January 2014), and was created by G. Willow Wilson and Adrian Alphona.

Muneeba is the mother of Kamala Khan.

=== Muneeba Khan in other media ===
- Muneeba Khan appears in the Marvel Rising franchise, voiced by Meera Kumbhani.
- Muneeba Khan appears in Marvel Future Avengers, voiced by Emiko Takeuchi in the original Japanese version and Kathreen Khavari in the English dub.
- Muneeba Khan appears in media set in the Marvel Cinematic Universe (MCU), portrayed by Zenobia Shroff. This version is overprotective and untrusting of Kamala Khan and constructed her Ms. Marvel suit.

== Yusuf Khan ==
Yusuf Khan is a character appearing in American comic books published by Marvel Comics. He first appeared in All-New Marvel Now! Point One #1 (January 2014), and was created by G. Willow Wilson and Adrian Alphona.

Yusuf Khan is a banker who is the father of Kamala Khan.

=== Yusuf Khan in other media ===
- Yusuf Khan appears in media set in the Marvel Cinematic Universe (MCU), portrayed by Mohan Kapur. This version gave Kamala Khan her code name of Ms. Marvel.
- Yusuf Khan appears in Marvel Future Avengers, voiced by Takeshi Hayakawa in the original Japanese version and Sina Emedson in the English dub.
- Yusuf Khan appears in Marvel's Avengers, voiced by Brian George.
- Yusuf Khan appears in the Marvel Rising motion comic, voiced by Tony Mirrcandani.

== Khora of the Burning Heart ==
Khora of the Burning Heart is a character appearing in American comic books published by Marvel Comics. Created by Al Ewing and Valerio Schiti, she first appeared in shadow in Empyre: Aftermath Avengers #1 (November 2020) and made her full debut in S.W.O.R.D. (vol. 2) #5 (June 2021). Khora is a mutant from Arakko and a member of S.W.O.R.D. who possesses an internal energy source that enables her to enhance her abilities and those of others.

Khora is the daughter of the Fisher King and Zsora of the Spirit Flame. After her parents are captured following a failed attack on the Great Ring of Arakko, Khora and her sister Zsen are forced to witness their mother's execution. As an adult, Khora becomes an assassin on Arakko.

== Kid Juggernaut ==
Kid Juggernaut (Justin Jin) is a character appearing in American comic books published by Marvel Comics. Created by Anthony Oliveira and Minkyu Jung, he first appeared in Kid Juggernaut: Marvel's Voices #100 (May 2024). The character is gay.

Justin Jin is originally from South Korea. His grandfather, Moon-Ho, was previously the host of Cyttorak. Justin and his family later immigrated to Canada, where his father Jung-Woo was mysteriously killed. Justin inherited Jung-Woo's possessions, including a piece of the Crimson Gem of Cyttorak that transformed him into the next Juggernaut. Justin goes on to join the Avengers Academy as a student. He is a main character in the series Avengers Academy: Marvel's Voices (2024–2025).

== Kid Kaiju ==
Kid Kaiju

Publication information
- First comic appearance: The Totally Awesome Hulk #3 (April 2016)
- Created by: Greg Pak, Frank Cho, Terry Dodson

In-story information
- Alter ego: Kei Kawade
- Team affiliations: Inhumans; NuHumans
- Partnerships: Elsa Bloodstone
- Abilities: Summoning Monsters; Dimensional Manipulation; Monster Creation

Kid Kaiju (Kei Kawade) is a character appearing in American comic books published by Marvel Comics. The character was created by Greg Pak, Frank Cho and Terry Dodson and first appeared, albeit unnamed, in The Totally Awesome Hulk #3 (April 2016). His first official appearance was in Monsters Unleashed Vol. 2 #1 (March 2017).

Kei Kawade is a Japanese American kid from Atlanta, Georgia who loved Kaiju monsters of all kinds. His life changed when the Terrigen Mists awakened his Inhuman DNA. His parents, Minouru and Deanna, were relieved to see that it did not appear to have any effect on him. However, Xemnu came out of nowhere and attacked Minouru's workplace forcing the family to move. After a second attack, Kei's parents began to suspect that the Terrigen Mist had changed their son. When the family lived in Oahu, Hawaii, Kei drew a picture of Amadeus Cho's Hulk form battling Fin Fang Foom resulting in the two materializing and confirming Minouru and Deanna's suspicion. Since then, the Kawades continued to move, leaving a trail of monster attacks.

During the events of Monsters Unleashed, the Leviathon Tide began invading the Earth. With no other choice, Kei summons Fin Fang Foom, Gorgilla, Zzutak, and Green Thing with Foom warning him against summoning more. Later on, Elsa Bloodstone breaks into Kei's house and tells him that she is just "doing [her] job". Elsa takes Kei to Parker Industries to meet with the various heroes and monsters who are defending Earth. To demonstrate his powers, Kei summons Devil Dinosaur and unintentionally brings along Moon Girl for the ride. Moon Girl gives Kei encouraging words and forms a close friendship with him due to their shared Inhuman heritage. Together they decipher the Leviathon's shrieks and howls and discover they wanted to "cleanse" the earth. Rallying with the other heroes, and earning the name "Kid Kaiju" from Spider-Man, Kei confronts the Leviathon Mother. He creates his own original monsters Slizzik, Hi-Vo, Aegis, Fireclaw, Scragg, and Mekara. When Fireclaw is killed, Kei combines himself with his monsters to form Smasher and successfully defeat the Leviathon Mother. Some of the Leviathons go into hiding on Earth, while the others retreat into outer space. The Inhumans create an island for Kei and his family called Mu, and Elsa promises to act as a mentor to him. Kei is home schooled by H.E.R.B.I.E. and frequently visited by Damage Control liaison Gloria Clark.

=== Kid Kaiju in other media ===
- Kid Kaiju appears in Marvel Future Avengers, voiced by Fujiko Takimoto in the original Japanese version and by Bryce Papenbrook in the English dub.
- Kid Kaiju appears as a playable character in Marvel: Future Fight.

== Kid Kree ==
Kid Kree (Mel-Varr) is a character from Marvel Comics. The character, created by Brandon Montclare, Amy Reeder, and Marco Failla, first appeared in Moon Girl And Devil Dinosaur #7 (May, 2016).

Mel-Varr is a young Kree child who is the son of General Pad-Varr. Wanting to prove himself as fully capable, and to help the Kree keep the Inhumans under control, Mel-Varr takes a ship to Earth and decides to look for the least threatening Inhuman to prove his worth to his father. He picks Lunella Lafayette, the newly christened Moon Girl, and goes undercover at her school as Marvin Ellis in an attempt to get close to her and her friends. When Lunella goes out as Moon Girl, along with Devil Dinosaur, Mel-Varr dons his true guise to fight her. He initially names himself Captain Kree, but everyone including Moon Girl, refers to him as Kid Kree, a name which sticks much to his chagrin. Despite meaning ill will towards Lunella, she does not take him seriously and continues to humiliate him.

After Lunella finally tells Mel-Varr off, Mel-Varr begins to fall in love with Lunella and reveals his identity to her. He asks that she come back with him, but she refuses. However, she does allow him to help out with their science project which he happily complies with. Pad-Varr and an army of Kree soldiers arrive to capture Lunella themselves, but Mel-Varr fends them off with Lunella and Devil Dinosaur's help. Mel-Varr still insists that he is in love with Lunella, but she gently rebuffs him, stating that they both need to grow up. Mel-Varr is sadly forced to go back home with his father. He briefly returns, along with several other heroes, to aid Lunella in battling the Doombots. Once again, Lunella rebuffs his romantic intentions. He apparently still maintains a good friendship with her.

=== Kid Kree in other media ===
Kid Kree appears in Moon Girl and Devil Dinosaur, voiced by Xolo Maridueña. This version was sent to Earth to hunt Moon Girl, but ends up befriending her.

== Kidpool ==
Kidpool (sometimes called Kid Deadpool) is the name of several characters appearing in American comic books published by Marvel Comics.

=== Widdle Wade ===
Widdle Wade is a short clone of Deadpool who was created by a Yakuza mob.

=== Christopher Cassera ===
A boy named Christopher Cassera became Pool Boy, and later Kid Deadpool, after wrongfully assuming that Deadpool killed his father. They worked together to take down the real culprit Maxy Millions.

=== Kidpool of Earth-10330 ===
On Earth-10330, Wade Wilson was a troubled student at the Xavier Orphanage for Troubled Boys. He was recruited by Deadpool to join the Deadpool Corps in saving the Multiverse.

=== Gwen ===
Kidpool appears in the 2024 film Deadpool & Wolverine, portrayed by Inez Reynolds. Kidpool returns in the comic book Kidpool & Spider-Boy, where she is revealed to be a young girl named Gwen. She falls in love with Spider-Boy and describes herself as being "from another dimension or possibly some kind of clone".

== Kade Kilgore ==
Kade Kilgore is a supervillain appearing in American comic books published by Marvel Comics. He was created by Jason Aaron and Frank Cho, first appearing in X-Men: Schism #1 (July, 2011).

Kade Kilgore is a child genius, and the son of a weapons-manafacturer. He murdered his own father and installed himself as the C.E.O. of his company and became the Black King of the Hellfire Club. He recruited other child prodigys to his Hellfire Club, including Maximilian Frankenstein, Manuel Enduque, and Wilhelmina Kensington. He often attacks the Jean Grey School for Higher Learning, even setting up the rival Hellfire Academy.

== Emrys Killebrew ==
Emrys Killebrew is a scientist employed by the Weapon X program. He runs a facility called the Workshop, where he is given failed test subjects and permitted to do whatever experiments he wants on them so long as they are eventually terminated. Killebrew hires Francis Freeman as an enforcer to keep the subjects under control, while he places them through horrific and unethical procedures.

Wade Wilson is one of Killebrew's favored patients because he endures levels of pain and torture that killed lesser subjects, encouraging Killebrew to find increasingly creative ways to hurt him. Killebrew's final experiment, involving the transplant of DNA from Wolverine, gives Wilson a powerful healing factor. Wilson kills Freeman and escapes the Workshop.

Freeman is resurrected through cybernetics and tracks down Deadpool, killing all of the escaped patients from Weapon X. After torturing Killebrew for info, he is able to learn Deadpool's whereabouts and find him. Overcome with guilt, Killebrew sacrifices himself to destroy Freeman's helmet.

== Killionaire ==
Killionaire is a character appearing in American comic books published by Marvel Comics. Created by Dan Slott and Paco Medina, he first appeared in Spider-Boy (vol. 2) #3 (January 2024).

Killionaire is a young influencer and enemy of Spider-Boy whose real name is unknown and is often accompanied by two unnamed loyal bodyguards. From what Spider-Boy can recall when Spider-Man caught up to him, Killionaire once hired Arcade to capture him and take him to Murderworld.

Showing up in person, Killionaire helped Shannon Stillwell create Toy Soldier, a living action figure who possesses all the powers of the Avengers, by reverse-engineering the Super-Adaptoid technology.

== Gabby Kinney ==
Gabby Kinney

Publication information
- Publisher: Marvel Comics
- First appearance: All-New Wolverine #2 (November 2015)
- Created by: Tom Taylor; David Lopez

In-story information
- Alter ego: Gabrielle "Gabby" Kinney
- Species: Human mutant
- Team affiliations: X-Men; Champions Reinforcement Roster; Lost Club; New Mutants
- Notable aliases: Honey Badger; Scout

Gabrielle "Gabby" Kinney, also known as Honey Badger and Scout, is a superhero appearing in American comic books published by Marvel Comics.

Gabby Kinney first appeared in All-New Wolverine #2 (November 2015), immediately earning strong fanbase. She was created by Tom Taylor and David Lopez. In 2010s, Gabby was commonly associated with Laura Kinney and had appeared in All-New Wolverine and X-23 series along with X-Men: Red, where both of them were X-Men.

Gabby Kinney was cloned by the company Alchemax using Laura Kinney's DNA. After the death of Logan, Laura took up the Wolverine mantle and discovered Gabby among several clones, most of whom died seeking revenge. Gabby was the youngest and least traumatized. She survived and was adopted by Laura as her sister, living with her in New York. Gabby later assumes the Honey Badger codename, is nearly killed by an alternate reality version of Wolverine, and is briefly transformed into a Brood queen, becoming part of the alien species' hive mind.

Gabby is recruited by Jean Grey for X-Men. While investigating the company Harvest, Gabby and Laura discover a shipment tied to their DNA. She sets out with her pet Jonathan to track the clones, eventually finding a lab full of flame-resistant turkeys. After they survive the lab explosion, she discovers a kill switch labeled "T.U.O.K.S." and realizing it spelled "Scout" backward, she adopts it as her new codename. Gabby is listed in the Champions Reinforcement Roster.

Gabby first meets Deadpool during a mission to stop an alien virus on Roosevelt Island. The two quickly bond and declare themselves best friends. After defeating the virus, Gabby gives Deadpool one of her fingers as a gift. They later team up to investigate animal experimentation. Together, they stop a zombified zebra and confront Palmive Industries, the company behind the experiments. Deadpool lets Gabby free the remaining animals while he deals with the company's leader, showing his protective side by sparing her from violence.

Gabby relocates to Krakoa after its establishment as a mutant nation and battles Omega Red. On Krakoa, she struggles to find her place and the Quiet Council of Krakoa has excluded clones from resurrection protocols. She attempts to connect with family including Daken and Wolverine. Her offer to help train younger mutants is rejected by Warpath, who criticizes her human-based combat training.

Gabby is killed by Shadow King on the eve of the Hellfire Gala after she confronts him for the threat he posed. Shadow King had been recruiting and manipulating younger mutants in an effort to extend his influence, with the goal of controlling Krakoa by corrupting them. This leads the Five to resurrect Gabby, overruling the Quiet Council.

Unlike her siblings, Gabby possesses the regenerative healing factor, like Laura and Logan. While she has only one claw on each arm, her healing abilities are notably advanced with lack of pain response. She is noted for her ability to make friends easily.

=== Reception ===
- In 2019, CBR ranked Honey Badger 1st in "10 Best New X-Men of the Decade" list.
- In 2020, CBR ranked Honey Badger 7th in "X-Men Red: Every Member, Ranked By Power."
- In 2022, CBR ranked Scout 1st in "Wolverine's Children, Ranked By Likeability", 7th in "Wolverine's 10 Most Powerful Children" list, 9th in "10 Cutest Marvel Heroes" list. and 1st in "10 Most Wholesome X-Men" list.
- In 2023, CBR ranked Scout 3rd in "10 Coolest Clones In Marvel Comics" list.
- In 2023, Screen Rant ranked Scout's inability to feel pain 5th in "15 Best Wolverine Family Superpowers (That Logan Doesn't Have)" list.
- In 2024, Screen Rant ranked Scout 13th in "15 Most Powerful X-Men Heroes Introduced in The Last Decade" list.

== Kirigi ==
Kirigi is a character appearing in American comic books published by Marvel Comics. The character first appeared in Daredevil #174 (September 1981), and was created by Frank Miller. He was a deadly assassin of The Hand. A faithful servant of their then present "Jonin", Kirigi is said to not die. He survived impalement by Elektra and continued to pursue the female assassin after a short recuperation. Kirigi is next decapitated by Elektra while the former was on fire and this seemed to end or severely curtail his existence. However, Kirgi's head and body were reattached and reanimated by the Hand and he returned to attack Daredevil. This time his body was destroyed by fire which appeared to end his life again. After he fell, Stick's allies destroyed his body.

=== Kirigi in other media ===
- Kirigi appears in Elektra (2005), portrayed by Will Yun Lee.
- Kirigi appears a boss in Daredevil (2003).
- Kirigi appears in Marvel Heroes.
- Kirigi was considered to appear in Daredevil (2015), but was replaced with Nobu Yoshioka (portrayed by Peter Shinkoda).

== Kitty-Bug ==
Kitty-Bug is a member of the X-Bugs and insect version of Shadowcat.

== Kiwi Black ==
Kiwi Black is a mutant who first appeared in The Uncanny X-Men #429 (August 2003). Little is known about the past of Kiwi Black, apart from the fact his mother Rēhua is from Ruatoki, New Zealand, and that his father, Azazel, seduced her. Kiwi Black is the half-brother of Abyss, and previously Nightcrawler.

The character Kiwi Black is a mutant bred by Azazel to help him transport his army to Earth from the hellish dimension they have been trapped in. However, after he survives a summoning ritual (one of three to survive) meant to free Azazel's army, he starts secretly to operate within Azazel's castle to free the X-Men. Kiwi rejects his father's influence, and allies himself with the X-Men to eliminate Azazel's army. In the process, he kills one of Azazel's thugs and gains respect from Nightcrawler. After M-Day, it is revealed that Kiwi Black is among the many mutants depowered, as listed by S.H.I.E.L.D., alongside his half-brother Abyss. Kiwi Black can focus bio-energy through his body to increase the potency of his physical attacks.

== Klaatu ==
Klaatu
- First appearance: The Incredible Hulk vol. 2 #136-137; (Feb – March 1971)
- Created by: Roy Thomas
- Based on: Moby Dick

Klaatu first appeared in The Incredible Hulk vol. 2 #136-137 (Feb.-March 1971), a two-part story which credits Roy Thomas as sole writer, but was scripted alongside Gerry Conway and Herb Trimpe. Klaatu's character was a thinly veiled pastiche of Moby Dick. The name Klaatu was borrowed from the central character of The Day the Earth Stood Still.

Klaatu was once attacked by the Andromeda Starship, in a manner reminiscent of terrestrial whaling. In self-defense, Klaatu destroys the craft, injuring an unnamed oarsmen who was given cybernetics on half his body and obsessively hunted Klaatu afterwards.

In the present, Klaatu arrives in New York City and causes a city-wide blackout. Cybor's first mate Xeron, irritated at the Hulk for causing him to lose his quarry, knocked him unconscious with an energy harpoon. Upon waking, the Hulk was attacked by the Abomination.

The Andromeda Starship later confronted Klaatu again, and Xeron and Cybor were able to mortally wound the creature before their own ship was severely damaged in the process. While Xeron tried to save the ship and its crew, Cybor fell onto the creature's back as it drifted into space and apparently into the sun, presumably to both their deaths, while the Andromeda Starship appeared stranded in space.

Years later it is revealed that Klaatu was not killed, but rejuvenated by the sun's energy, and had saved Xeron and Cybor and the Andromeda Starship. The Hulk encountered him again in the Crossroads, an interdimensional nexus in which the Hulk was then trapped. The Hulk, in a more feral state of mind, attacked Klaatu, again to no effect. Klaatu departs before the arrival of the Andromeda Starship, which is still pursuing Captain Cybor's vendetta, and which captures the Hulk, and then follows Klaatu into "Ocean World".

The Andromeda Starship confronts Klaatu again, but retreats when the Hulk wakes up and starts tearing the ship apart. The starship again finds Klaatu and injures it with several energy harpoons. Angered, Klaatu destroys the ship, killing its entire crew. However, the Hulk takes pity on Klaatu and removes the harpoons from its body.

== Kly'bn ==
- First appearance: Runaways (vol. 2) #14 (May 2006) (mentioned); Incredible Hercules #117 (July 2008)
- Created by: Greg Pak, Fred Van Lente
- Species: Skrull Eternal (formerly); Skrull God
- Aliases: He, the Eternal Skrull
- Further reading: Kly'bn at the Comic Book DB (archived from the original)

Kly'bn is a deity created by Greg Pak and Fred Van Lente and first appeared in Incredible Hercules #117, while being first mentioned in Runaways (vol. 2) #14 in contrast to his wife Sl'gur't who first appeared in Fantastic Four Annual #24 of July, 1991.

Millions of years ago, after the Celestials had created the Skrull Eternals, Deviants and Prime, the Deviant Skrulls wiped out the other two branches believing that they themselves were the superior branch, leaving only one member of each wiped branch. Kly'bn was the last Skrull Eternal, who convinced the Deviant Skrulls and their Queen Sl'gur't that killing him would be killing themselves, as he was the embodiment of the idea of the Skrull and it was his destiny to lead the Skrulls into changing the other worlds with their truth. Sl'gur't embraced his ideas and became lovers with the two becoming gods of the Skrull Pantheon. Since Kly'bn was unable to shapeshift, Sl'gur't vowed to never keep her form for too long in contrast to her husband. The couple together wrote the Book of World Skrull, where there was written three prophesies. These prophesies told about the eventual destruction of the Skrull homeworld and about Earth being the new home for the Skrulls. These prophesies were the main reason of the events of "Secret Invasion", being a holy war for the Skrulls. When the God Squad arrived at their fortress via Nightmare's realm, Kly'bn and Sl'gur't were forced into battling them. Sl'gur't was eaten by the Demogorge, but since she represented several deities, the Demogorge exploded. Sl'gur't then started a shapeshifting battle against Amatsu-Mikaboshi, with them copying each other. Eventually, Mikaboshi in Sl'gur't form killed Sl'gur't who was in Mikaboshi's form, allowing him to replace her. After Kly'bn killed Ajak, Hercules started battling Kly'bn. Hercules was able to defeat Kly'bn, after Snowbird impaled him with the spine of the Demogorge.

== Kobak Never-Held ==
Kobak Never-Held is a character appearing in American comic books published by Marvel Comics. He was created by Al Ewing and Jacopo Camagni and first appeared in S.W.O.R.D. (vol. 2) #9 (December 2021).

Kobak is an Omega-level mutant from Arakko who can fire quills from his body sharp enough to pierce almost anything. He was born during the fall of Arakko and grew up under the Amenthi occupation of the island. When he and his lover Tarlo had dissident thoughts against Annihilation, they were both arrested. Tarlo took the blame and he later died in prison. Kobak, heartbroken, wept for a year and afterwards would never shed tears again.

After Arakko is freed from Annihilation's control and relocated to Mars, Kobak challenges Storm for her seat on the Great Ring of Arakko, unwilling to accept a Krakoan mutant in a position traditionally reserved for the strongest Arakkii. Losing the duel, he becomes more accepting of the Krakoans living on Arakko.

Kobak fights against the forces of Uranos when the Eternals declare war on mutants. After the war, he becomes a member of the Great Ring, defeating fellow challenger Calderak for the Seat of Victory left vacant by Isca the Unbeaten. When Genesis returns to Arakko and incites a civil war, Kobak sides with Storm.

== Amiko Kobayashi ==
Amiko Kobayashi is a character appearing in American comic books published by Marvel Comics. She was created by Chris Claremont and John Romita Jr., and first appeared in The Uncanny X-Men #181 (May 1984).

Amiko found herself orphaned when she and her mother were caught in a battle between the X-Men and a dragon. Discovering the dying woman and her young daughter, Wolverine promised that the girl would be raised as though she were his own child. With most of his time devoted to the X-Men, he entrusted Amiko to his love Mariko Yashida, whom Amiko began to regard as a surrogate mother. In the limited series Wolverine: Soultaker, Amiko discovered that her mother belonged to a family of warriors called the Shosei. Amiko now spends time with them trying to improve her martial arts skills, and hoping to make her adoptive father Logan proud of her.

== Kobik ==
- First appearance: Marvel NOW! Point One #1 (June 2015)
- Created by: Chris Bachalo
- Teams: Thunderbolts; S.H.I.E.L.D.
- Abilities: Mind control
- Further reading: Kobik at the Comic Book DB (archived from the original)

Kobik is a physical manifestation of a Cosmic Cube in the Marvel Comics universe.

The character, created by Chris Bachalo, first appeared in Marvel NOW! Point One #1 (June 2015).

Kobik originated from a S.H.I.E.L.D. project using fragments of Cosmic Cubes. The pieces merge into a single being who adopts the form of a child. Kobik becomes a member of the Thunderbolts.

During her time affiliated with S.H.I.E.L.D., Kobik is involved in the Pleasant Hill project, where supervillains are taken to a pre-created town and brainwashed to act as normal civilians. At the same time, Kobik comes into contact with the Red Skull, the Cube's past experience with the Skull giving her a certain attachment to him. Using his influence on her, the Skull is able to convince her of Hydra being a noble organization. Kobik later makes contact with the elderly Steve Rogers during a stand-off where his life is in danger, and as a consequence of the Skull's manipulation, she not only reverts him to his youthful state but also rewrites his history so that he has been a Hydra sleeper agent since childhood. As Hydra's "Secret Empire" rises to power in the United States, Kobik begins to regretfully rewrite Rogers' mind, but it is revealed that the memory of his original, good conscious has remained hidden in her mind. The original Steve Rogers tries to convince Kobik to undo her mistakes, but she believes it is too late and is frightened of Hydra Rogers. Making things worse, in the real world Arnim Zola implants a Cosmic Cube into Rogers' physical body during the Resistance's hopeful raid on Hydra's main base, led by Sam Wilson. However, the good Rogers manages to get through to her, and eventually, they are both saved by Bucky Barnes and Scott Lang, who takes away Hydra Rogers' ability to use both the Cosmic Cube and Mjolnir, allowing the real Captain America to defeat his mind-altered self. After Hydra Rogers is defeated, Kobik restores the history of the world, although she leaves some aspects intact from the Hydra-created reality.

== Donna Kraft ==
Donna Kraft is a character appearing in American comic books published by Marvel Comics. The character, created by Terry Kavanagh, Ron Garney, and Gary Kwapisz, first appeared in Marc Spector: Moon Knight #38 (May 1992).

Donna is a friend of Marlene Alraune who is recommended for a publicist position at SpectorCorp. She apparently went on a date with Marc Spector, but when he tried to kiss her the next time he saw her, she slapped him, telling him that their "date" was nothing more than a public relations move to improve Marc's image. Donna quickly becomes suspicious of Marlene when she learns that she once dated Marc and that she was working for SpectorCorp's rival company PhalkonCorp, headed by Seth Phalkon. Despite this, Donna came to Marlene's rescue when one of Seth's minions, Hook, tried to kill her. While Marc battled Seth in one final battle, Donna and Marlene worked together to merge PhalkonCorp with SpectorCorp, becoming the new owners of the company. Following Marc's "death", Donna found herself being left in the dark by Marlene, who seemed to know more than she was letting on. What became of Donna and SpectorCorp has not been seen since.

=== Donna Kraft in other media ===
Donna Kraft appears in Moon Knight, portrayed by Lucy Thackeray. This version is British and is the manager of the art museum where Steven Grant works. She constantly bullies and belittles him and cares little for his interest in Egyptian mythology.

== Kraken ==
Kraken is the name of several characters appearing in American comic books published by Marvel Comics.

=== Sea monsters ===
The first Kraken made multiple appearances in Marvel continuity, including The Avengers #27 (April 1966, Marvel Comics), Tales to Astonish #93 and Sub-Mariner #27 (July 1970), before returning years later in the second issue of the limited series Fallen Son: The Death of Captain America (#1–5, June–August 2007)., and in The New Invaders #4 from April 2014.

A Kraken appeared in the short story "When Strikes the Kraken!" in Kull the Destroyer #17 (October 1976), and was reprinted in Chronicles of Kull 2: The Hell Beneath Atlantis and Other Stories.

Another Kraken (a gigantic squid) debuted in the black and white Bizarre Adventures #26 (May 1981).

A creature called The Black Kraken debuted in the short story "Red Shadows and Black Kraken!" (based on the 1968 fantasy novel Conan of the Isles written by L. Sprague de Camp and Lin Carter featuring Robert E. Howard's hero Conan the Barbarian. The story is republished in the graphic novel Conan of the Isles.) in Conan the Barbarian Annual #7 (1982).

Another version of the Kraken (four-armed and reptilian in appearance) debuted in Marvel Comics Presents #121 (January 1993). It returned in Marvel Action Hour featuring the Fantastic Four #2–4 (December 1994 – February 1995) and in the one-shot title Namora #1 (August 2010); it would later be featured in the video game Marvel Ultimate Alliance. A Kraken (a horned squid creature) appeared in the 2009 one-shot comic Sub-Mariner Comics: 70th Anniversary Special, while another (a house sized crab/octopus hybrid) appeared in Fantomex Max issues #2 and #3. This Kraken was modified into a remote-controlled cyborg to protect an underwater base of a brilliant scientist.

Two additional versions possessed ties to Greek mythology. The first served the Olympian gods and debuted in the one-shot Chaos War: God Squad #1 (February 2011) before returning in The Incredible Hulk (vol. 2) #622 (April 2011). The second Kraken appeared in the four-part limited series Wolverine/Hercules: Myths, Monsters & Mutants. Spirited away by the god Poseidon after a defeat by Greek hero Perseus, the creature is revived in modern times by Eurystheus to battle the heroes Hercules and Wolverine.

=== Daniel Whitehall ===
Daniel Whitehall is a British intelligence agent also known as the Kraken.

An elite assassin and member of the terrorist organization Hydra, he also used the name and debuted in Secret Warriors #2 (March 2009). Writer/artist Jonathan Hickman stated in an interview with Comic Book Resources that "Kraken" is a new character. The other Hydra character with that name [Commander Kraken] was "a real b-list character and pretty lame. Our Kraken... has a long and elaborate history and we're going to be delving into that in a major way". Kraken is a legendary Hydra agent whose existence could not be verified, as all of the S.H.I.E.L.D. agents who tried to find documented proof disappeared. The Kraken preferred to work behind the scenes, seeing it as his mission to help people become what they are meant to be, usually with dangerous results. For decades, he was responsible for developing Hydra's best assets, training their best talent. This involved a lot of human trafficking, theft, and murder. He was the head of the school that trained orphaned girls (including Ophelia Sarkissian) into human weapons. The original Kraken is Whitehall, but a second version stole his equipment and read his journals.

=== Jake Fury ===
The second Kraken is Jake Fury, who infiltrated Hydra to help Nick Fury bring about its destruction.

=== Unnamed ===
A new Kraken is seen when the new Madame Hydra is collecting members for the Hydra High Council to assist Captain America, whose history had been altered by the Red Skull's clone using the powers of Kobik to include him always being a member of Hydra. It is implied this person is someone Steve Rogers knows and believes to be dead.

=== Kraken in other media ===
- The sea creature incarnation of the Kraken appears as a boss in Marvel: Ultimate Alliance.
- Daniel Whitehall appears in the second season of Agents of S.H.I.E.L.D., portrayed by Reed Diamond. This version, born Werner Reinhardt, was a member of Hydra in 1945 before being arrested by Peggy Carter and the Strategic Scientific Reserve. In 1989, an elderly Reinhardt was freed from life imprisonment by Hydra infiltrators within S.H.I.E.L.D. and encounters Jiaying, an Inhuman woman whom he encountered during WWII and has not aged since. He dissected her in an attempt to find out why this was and transplanted her abilities to himself; restoring him to his WWII age and unknowingly becoming the target of revenge at the hands of Jiaying's husband Calvin Zabo. In the present, Reinhardt took the name "Daniel Whitehall", took over as Hydra's North American leader, leads an effort to acquire a Kree artifact called the "Diviner", and utilizes Johann Fennhoff's work to brainwash people into Hydra's service before being killed by Phil Coulson.
- The sea creature incarnation of the Kraken appears in the Ultimate Spider-Man episode "Return to the Spider-Verse" Pt. 2. This version is a giant squid from a pirate-themed alternate reality.
- An image of Reed Diamond used to represent Daniel Whitehall appears in Avengers: Endgame.

== Nikolai Kravinoff ==
Nikolai Kravinoff is the father of Sergei Kravinoff and Dmitri Smerdyakov and the grandfather of Vladimir Kravinoff, Alyosha Kravinoff, and Ana Kravinoff. He originally served as a grand duke in Russia until the Russian Revolution occurred which caused him and his wife Ana Makarova to flee with an infant Sergei.

=== Nikolai Kravinoff in other media ===
Nikolai Kravinoff appears in Kraven the Hunter, portrayed by Russell Crowe. This version is a crime boss, drug trafficker, and a professional hunter who took in Sergei and Dmitri after the death of their mother. After taking them on a hunt in Ghana, Nikolai finds Sergei, who was injured protecting his brother from a lion, and reveals that he killed the lion to teach his sons a lesson. Years later, Nikolai refuses to pay Dmitri's ransom when he is kidnapped by Aleksei Sytsevich's henchmen. Following Sytsevich's death, Nikolai reveals to Sergei at his camp that he sent the video to Aleksei while disguised as Kraven and that he had been targeting him to manipulate his sons and eliminate him. When Sergei steals his ammunition, Nikolai is killed after being attacked by a bear.

== Simon Krieger ==
Simon Krieger is a character appearing in American comic books from Marvel Comics. The character, created by Kurt Busiek and Patrick Zircher, first appeared in Iron Man: The Iron Age #1 (June 1998). He was the Vice President of Roxxon's predecessor Republic Oil & Natural Gas.

Krieger arranged the murders of Howard Stark and Maria Stark to secure an attempted takeover of Stark Industries. Krieger next impersonates Tony Stark, nearly fooling Happy Hogan and Pepper Potts before using his personal enforcers in holding political hostages at the Helicarrier. However, his scheme is exposed by Iron Man and he is killed while in jail.

=== Simon Krieger in other media ===
Simon Krieger appears in Marvel's Spider-Man: Miles Morales, voiced by Troy Baker. This version is Roxxon's corrupt head of R&D. Seeking to have Roxxon Plaza, the company's headquarters, powered by Nuform, he secretly killed its developer Rick Mason for trying to expose Nuform's deadly properties and took credit for its creation. This brings Krieger into conflict with the Tinkerer, who leads the Underground criminal group in an all-out war against Roxxon while Spider-Man works to contain the resulting chaos. Krieger modifies the Nuform reactor to destroy Harlem if tampered with, but Spider-Man destroys the reactor. Krieger is subsequently arrested, and Roxxon is faced with numerous lawsuits.

== Kronos ==
Kronos is a character appearing in American comic books published by Marvel Comics.

Kronos is an Eternal and the brother of Uranos who became a cosmic entity as a result of his experiments.

== Krugarr ==
Krugarr is a character appearing in American comic books published by Marvel Comics. He is a Sorcerer Supreme in the Earth-691 timeline of the Marvel Universe.

=== Earth-691 version ===
In the 22nd century, Doctor Strange finds a Lem named Krugarr on the planet Lemista. He agrees to become Strange's apprentice and learn the ways of magic. Krugarr later succeeds Strange as the Sorcerer Supreme. Strange, who takes on the title of the Ancient One, is later slain by the villain Dormammu.

Krugarr takes on Talon as an apprentice. Talon later declares that Krugarr was forced to reject him for not being able to keep up with his studies. Despite this, the two entities remain friends. Talon attributes this to being a 'nice flake'. Despite the lack of studying, Krugarr has managed to teach Talon simple magic, such as levitation.

During a battle with a murderous gang of vigilantes, Major Victory is shot in the head. Hollywood brings him to Krugarr, who manages to save his life. During this incident, they share a psychic link, which lasts long after Major Victory is healed.

Some time later, the world that is controlled by Mainframe is rocked with disasters due to the interference of an ancient Earth virus. Krugarr is summoned by Martinex via the highly advanced 'Star' worn by Guardians and their allies. Krugarr, who had just established his Sanctum Sanctorum on his homeworld of Lem, regretfully declines because there is a crisis growing in the "Dark Dimensions". Krugarr's telepathically sends Hollywood to help. Hollywood joins with several other powerful superheroes to save the innocent survivors of Mainframe's world. This spurs the creation of the Galactic Guardians.

=== Earth-616 version ===
The Earth-616 version of Krugarr appears during the Infinity War storyline as a member of the Mourners.

=== Krugarr in other media ===
- Krugarr makes a non-speaking appearance in the Marvel Cinematic Universe (MCU) film Guardians of the Galaxy Vol. 2. This version is a member of the Ravagers and an associate of Yondu Udonta. Following Yondu's death, Krugarr meets with Stakar Ogord, Martinex T'Naga, Charlie-27, Aleta Ogord, and Mainframe to reunite their original group in his memory.
- Krugarr appears in the MCU film Guardians of the Galaxy Vol. 3, motion-captured by Jared Gore.

== Krylar ==
Krylar is an assassin on K'ai who works for the warlord Visus.

=== Krylar in other media ===
Krylar appears in Ant-Man and the Wasp: Quantumania, portrayed by Bill Murray. This version is the governor of the city of Axia in the Quantum Realm and has a history with Janet van Dyne.

== Kubik ==
Kubik is a Cosmic Cube who first appears in Tales of Suspense #79 (July 1966), and as Kubik in The Avengers #289 (March 1988). The concept was created by Stan Lee and Jack Kirby and refined by Ralph Macchio. Kubik (once evolved into humanoid form and now a student of the entity the Shaper of Worlds) returns to Earth when attracted by an anomaly possessing a fraction of its power — revealed to be the robot the Super-Adaptoid. The Super-Adaptoid uses its abilities to "copy" Kubik's abilities and banishes the character, intent on creating a race in its image. The Super-Adaptoid, however, is tricked into shutting down by Captain America. Kubik returns and then removes the sliver of the original Cosmic Cube from the Super-Adaptoid that gave the robot its abilities. Like all Cosmic Cubes, Kubik possesses the ability to manipulate extra-dimensional energy to alter reality to achieve virtually any effect. Upon reaching maturity, a cube takes on humanoid form with its behavior modeled after the individuals who have possessed it. Kubik's chest also displays a holographic representation of a Cosmic Cube.

== Shen Kuei ==
Shen Kuei, also known as "The Cat", was created by Doug Moench and Paul Gulacy and first appeared in Master of Kung Fu #38–39 (March–April 1976). He is a freelance espionage operative, and has been both an enemy and ally of Shang-Chi. He is a master thief whose skill in martial arts equals Shang-Chi's. The meaning of the character's name is both similar and opposite to Shang Chi's name.

== Zelda Kurtzberg ==
Zelda Kurtzberg is a character created by Stan Lee and Jack Kirby, first appearing in X-Men (vol. 1) #7 (July, 1964). She is a waitress that dates Bobby Drake (Iceman) briefly, who often ditched her to assume his superhero identity, of which she was oblivious. She introduced Hank McCoy (Beast) to Vera Cantor.

== Kylun ==
Kylun

Publication information
- First comic appearance: Excalibur #2 (July, 1988)
- Created by: Alan Davis, Chris Claremont

In-story information
- Alter ego: Colin McKay
- Species: Human mutant
- Team affiliations: Excalibur

Kylun (Colin McKay) is a mutant character appearing in American comics books published by Marvel Comics. He is a superhero and a reoccurring member of Excalibur. The character, created by Alan Davis and Chris Claremont, first appeared in Excalibur #2 (July, 1988). His mutation gives him a lion-like appearance as well as the ability to perfectly mimic any sound he hears. He also wields the Blades of Zz'ria, twin blades that are unable to harm the pure of heart.

Colin McKay is a mutant from Earth-616, who escaped to the alternate reality of Ee'rath after being chased by soldiers of the crime lord, Vixen. On this planet, he was trained to be a warrior under the care of the royal mystic Zz'ria and fell in love with Princess Sa'tneen. Later in his life, the evil sorcerer Necrom attacked the kingdom and slew much of the population. Kylun and Sa'tneen fought Necrom, with Sa'tneen perishing.

Necrom fled to Earth-616 and Kylun followed, where he met and joined Excalibur. Necrom was later defeated by Rachel Summers and Kylun continued to stay with Excalibur. He buried Sa'tneen at Braddock Manor before he left to meet his parents, but was attacked and captured by Warpies. He was later freed to aid Excalibur.

Later, Colin was transported to the Age of X-Man plane, where he worked as a personal trainer. He was later freed, and joined the mutant nation of Krakoa, as well as the Knights of X on Otherworld at times.

== K'ythri and Sharra ==
- First appearance: Starjammers #1 (October 1995)
- Created by: Warren Ellis, Carlos Pacheco
- Species: Shi'ar Gods
- Aliases: Ky'thri
- Further reading: K'ythri at the Comic Book DB (archived from the original)

K'ythri and Sharra are deities created by Warren Ellis and Carlos Pacheco, and were first depicted in Starjammers #1.

According to the Shi'ar mythology, the two chief deities, K'ythri and Sharra, were the creators of the universe. At first, they were enemies to each other, but were then forced into marriage, in which they found love. At their day of marriage, K'ythri presented Sharra the M'Kraan Crystal as their sign of love.

They were worshipped by the Shi'ar for millennia, until they were killed by Amatsu-Mikaboshi, but it seems that they had come back to life.
