= Inhumans premiere =

"Behold... The Inhumans" and "Those Who Would Destroy Us"
- Inhumans episodes
- Release poster
- Episode nos.: Season 1 Episodes 1 and 2
- Directed by: Roel Reiné
- Written by: Scott Buck
- Starring: Anson Mount; Serinda Swan; Ken Leung; Eme Ikwuakor; Isabelle Cornish; Ellen Woglom; Iwan Rheon
- Cinematography: Jeffrey Jur
- Producer: Jean Higgins
- Music by: Sean Callery
- Editing by: Radu Ion (1x01); Kristina Hamilton-Grobler (1x02)
- Production companies: ABC Studios; Marvel Television; Devilina Productions
- Original release dates: August 28, 2017 (Premiere); September 1, 2017 (IMAX); September 29, 2017 (ABC)
- Running time: 75 minutes (IMAX); 84 minutes (ABC)
- Distributed by: IMAX Entertainment (IMAX); Disney–ABC Television Group (ABC)
- Country: United States
- Language: English
- Box office: $3.5 million

Guest appearances
- Mike Moh as Triton; Sonya Balmores as Auran; Nicola Peltz; Marco Rodriguez as Kitang; Tom Wright as George Ashland; Michael Buie as Agon; Tanya Clarke as Rynda; Ty Quiamboa as Holo

Episode chronology
← Previous —	Next → "Divide and Conquer"

The series premiere of the American television series Inhumans, consisting of the episodes "Behold... The Inhumans" and "Those Who Would Destroy Us", was first released as an IMAX film before being broadcast on ABC as two separate episodes. Based on the Marvel Comics race Inhumans, the premiere is set in the Marvel Cinematic Universe (MCU) and acknowledges the franchise's other television series. The episodes were written by showrunner Scott Buck, directed by Roel Reiné, and star Anson Mount as Black Bolt alongside Serinda Swan, Ken Leung, Eme Ikwuakor, Isabelle Cornish, Ellen Woglom, and Iwan Rheon. In the premiere, Black Bolt and other members of the Inhuman Royal Family are exiled to Hawaii after a coup by Black Bolt's brother Maximus.

Inhumans was announced in November 2016 from ABC Studios and Marvel Television, with IMAX Entertainment as a financing partner. Reiné was hired in January 2017, with Mount cast the next month. Filming began in March 2017, at the former Naval Air Station Barbers Point airfield in Kalaeloa, Hawaii and various locations on the island of Oahu. The episodes were filmed on IMAX digital cameras, with new camera lenses created specifically for use on the series. The ABC version of the episodes features additional, exclusive content that was not included in the theatrical version of the premiere. Visual effects were provided by seven visual effects houses, which were designed to be shown on IMAX screens but created on a television budget and schedule.

The IMAX presentation of the episodes premiered in Los Angeles on August 28, 2017, and debuted in IMAX theaters on September 1, following months of poorly received marketing. Inhumans was the first live-action television series to debut in IMAX, and ran for two weeks, earning $3.5 million. "Behold... The Inhumans" and "Those Who Would Destroy Us" premiered on ABC on September 29, and were watched by 5.58 million viewers within a week of their release. Both versions of the premiere received negative reviews, with particular criticism going to the production value, which was compared to the rest of the MCU, as well as the acting and writing.

== Plot ==
=== "Behold... The Inhumans" ===
On the island of Oahu, Triton is in search of a newly transformed Inhuman when they are attacked by a strike team. The team kills the new Inhuman and injures Triton, who jumps into the ocean to escape. In Attilan, the secret city of the Inhumans on the Moon, Black Bolt, Medusa and other members of the Inhuman Royal Family discuss an Earth rover that nearly discovers them. Black Bolt does not feel there is need for concern.

The Royal Family attend a Terrigenesis ceremony, where the young Inhuman citizens Iridia and Bronaja are exposed to Terrigen Mist to reveal their abilities. After the process, Iridia receives the ability of flight, while Bronaja does not believe he has received abilities. When Black Bolt's brother Maximus, who does not have abilities due to being made human through his own Terrigenesis, goes to console him and touches his shoulder, Bronaja has a vision of Maximus pinned against a wall with snakes attacking him. After the ceremony, Maximus learns of Triton's mission on Earth and confronts Black Bolt about the matter. Black Bolt explains that he sent Triton to Earth to help find humans who had undergone Terrigenesis due to Terrigen entering Earth's water supply. (Note: As depicted in the Agents of S.H.I.E.L.D. episode "S.O.S.".) Triton was to bring them to Attilan to live free of prosecution.

Believing Triton may be dead, Gorgon travels to Earth to find him. Maximus questions Medusa's loyalty to Black Bolt, and she attacks Maximus with her prehensile hair, which Maximus realizes is the vision the Bronaja saw. Maximus talks to Kitang, the head of the Genetic Council, and reveals a plan to stage a coup to remove Black Bolt and Medusa from the throne. Kitang plans to have Maximus arrested, but is killed by Maximus' head of security Auran. On Earth, Gorgon is pursued by the same strike team, who receive a kill order from Maximus, but Gorgon defeats them. Karnak learns of what Maximus is doing and warns Medusa and her sister Crystal. Crystal has her dog Lockjaw send Karnak to safety on Earth, and does the same with Medusa and Black Bolt, but gets captured by Maximus's guards.

=== "Those Who Would Destroy Us" ===
Realizing they have all been stranded and separated on Earth, Karnak and Medusa begin to search for Black Bolt, and Gorgon uses his communication device to contact Maximus, hoping it will be tracked so the fight will come to him. Louise, at the Callisto Aerospace Control Center in California, begins to investigate the missing rover and learns of four strange occurrences coming from the same area of the Moon where the rover went missing. She tracks these to locations around Hawaii and decides to investigate further.

Maximus threatens the remaining members of the Genetic Council into following him, and continues to use Bronaja's further visions. He tries to convince Crystal to join him. Black Bolt's arrival causes a traffic disturbance, and he fights through the police to escape. He subsequently shoplifts new clothes, and is arrested. Auran pursues Medusa to Earth, only for Medusa to stab Auran for her betrayal, killing her. Maximus addresses the people of Attilan as their new king. Auran is later revived by her own healing ability and requests back-up from Maximus.

== Cast and characters ==
=== Main ===
- Anson Mount as Black Bolt
- Serinda Swan as Medusa
- Ken Leung as Karnak
- Eme Ikwuakor as Gorgon
- Isabelle Cornish as Crystal
- Ellen Woglom as Louise
- Iwan Rheon as Maximus

=== Guest ===
- Mike Moh as Triton
- Sonya Balmores as Auran
- Nicola Peltz
- Marco Rodriguez as Kitang
- Tom Wright as George Ashland
- Michael Buie as Agon
- Tanya Clarke as Rynda
- Ty Quiamboa as Holo

Crystal's 2,000-pound (910 kg) teleporting canine companion Lockjaw also appears, created through CGI.

== Production ==
=== Development ===
In November 2016, Marvel Television and IMAX Corporation announced the eight-episode television series Inhumans, to be produced in conjunction with ABC Studios and air on ABC, with the series set in the Marvel Cinematic Universe (MCU). In December, Scott Buck, the showrunner for the first season of the Marvel Netflix series Iron Fist, was revealed to also be executive producing and showrunning Inhumans; Jeph Loeb and Jim Chory also executive produce the series. In January 2017, Roel Reiné was announced as the director of the first two episodes. Reiné felt he was chosen because he could make the episodes "look really big" on a small budget and short schedule.

IMAX serves as a financing partner on Inhumans, the first time it had done so for a television series, paying completely for the two episodes. Because of this, the budget for Inhumans was higher than Marvel's other series, a positive for the episodes' visual effects. IMAX had originally approached Marvel about the deal after a successful IMAX event with Game of Thrones in 2015. Buck felt working with IMAX "gave us a lot more freedom and pushed and encouraged us to think a little bit bigger than we would if it was just a normal network show. We just wanted to think bigger in terms of scope, and what we were seeing, and how we bring these characters to the audience." Loeb cautioned that Inhumans was "a television show that is premiering in an IMAX theater" rather than a true film, but that it would still be a spectacle, and "a unique way to be able to see TV".

=== Writing ===
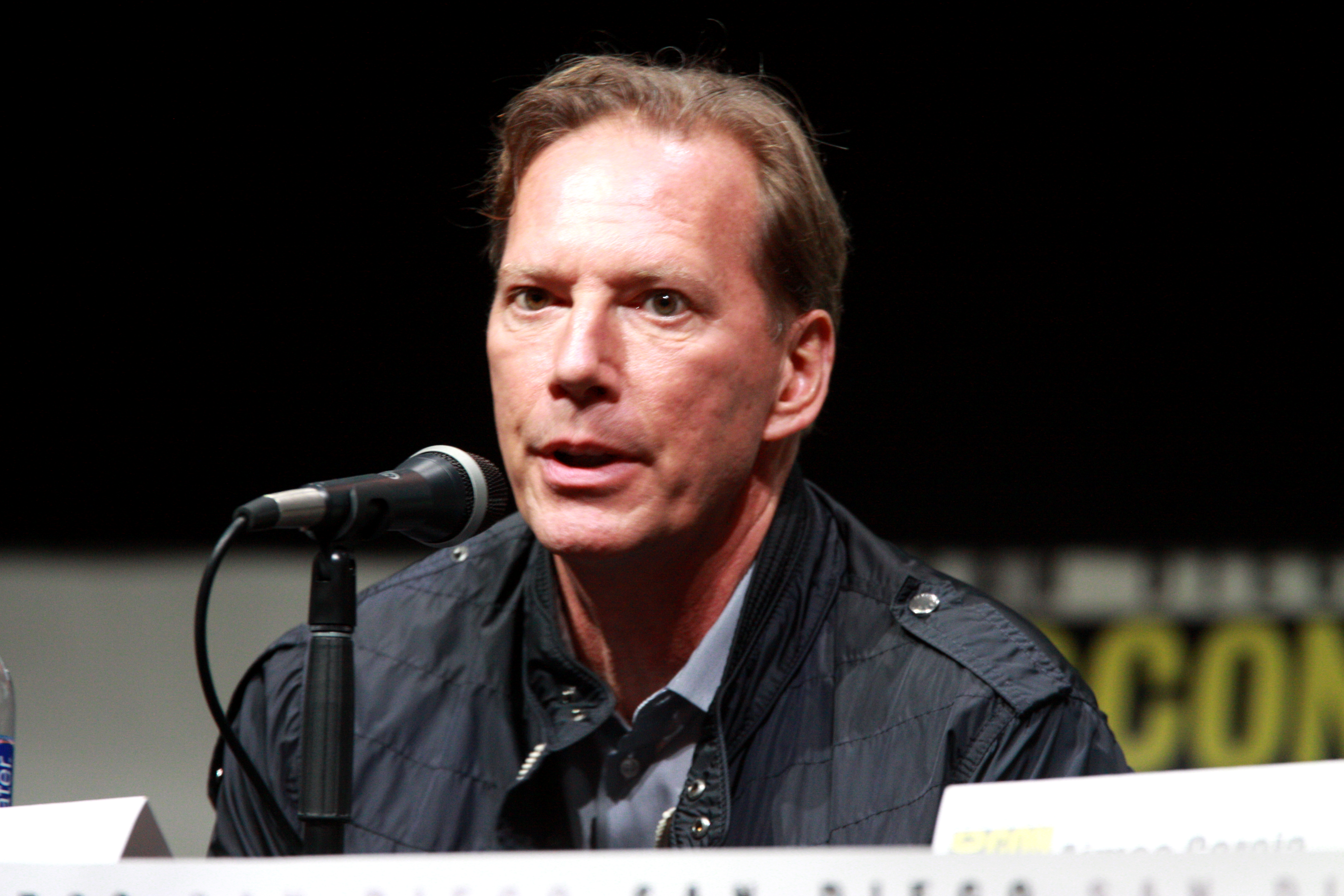
Showrunner Scott Buck wrote both premiere episodes.

Buck served as writer for both episodes, and said that they were intended to be "something that absolutely stands on its own", but hoped would "intrigue people enough to make them want to watch the rest of the show." The episodes begin "one big story leading us through the season" that focuses on the family drama of the Inhuman Royal Family, taking place at a "very critical juncture in their lives". It is an original story that Buck wrote after first researching the comics, going back to the characters' origin. Buck intended to ground the characters as real people who happen to have abilities, saying that he was more comfortable writing "slightly smaller character dramas", but did say that the IMAX presentation encouraged himself and the series' writers to think "a little bit bigger than we would if it was just a normal network show. We just wanted to think bigger in terms of scope, and what we were seeing, and how we bring these characters to the audience."

=== Casting ===
In late February 2017, Iwan Rheon was cast as Maximus, followed shortly by Anson Mount as Black Bolt. There was no audition for the role of Black Bolt since the character does not speak, with Mount instead cast due to an existing relationship with Loeb, who felt Mount would fit the role. At the start of March, the series added Serinda Swan as Medusa, Ken Leung as Karnak, Eme Ikwuakor as Gorgon, Isabelle Cornish as Crystal, and Ellen Woglom as Louise.

Mike Moh and Sonya Balmores were also cast in March 2017, as the guest roles of Triton and Auran, respectively. They are joined in the episodes by Nicola Peltz, Marco Rodriguez as Kitang, Tom Wright as George Ashland, Michael Buie as Agon, Tanya Clarke as Rynda, and Ty Quiamboa as Holo. Additional guests include Ari Dalbert as Bronaja, Aaron Hendry as Loyolis, Stephanie Anne Lewis as Paripon, Andra Nechita as Iridia, Garret T. Sato as the lead mercenary, Allen Clifford Cole as an outspoken Inhuman, Lofton Shaw as young Black Bolt, V.I.P. as young Medusa, Jason Lee Hoy as Royal Guard Sergeant, Steve Trzaska as Duodon, Jenna Bleu Forti as the lovely Inhuman server, Jason Quinn as Pulsus, Kala Alexander as Makani, Albert Ueligitone as Pablo, Moses Goods as Eldrac, Dan Cooke as a cowboy, Nolan Hong as a tourist, Brutus LaBenz as a cabbie, Tani Fujimoto-Kim as a clerk, Rick Agan as a police officer, Lopaka Kapanui as a police lieutenant, and Miriam Lucien as a serene Inhuman.

=== Design ===
The sets of the series were designed and built more vertically than usual to accommodate the IMAX release, with Carlos Barbosa serving as production designer. Crystal's bedroom was designed to be able to fit Lockjaw, her 2,000-pound (910 kg) dog; because he can teleport, the set's door frames did not have to be sized to the character, but areas such as where he sleeps in her room did.

=== Filming ===
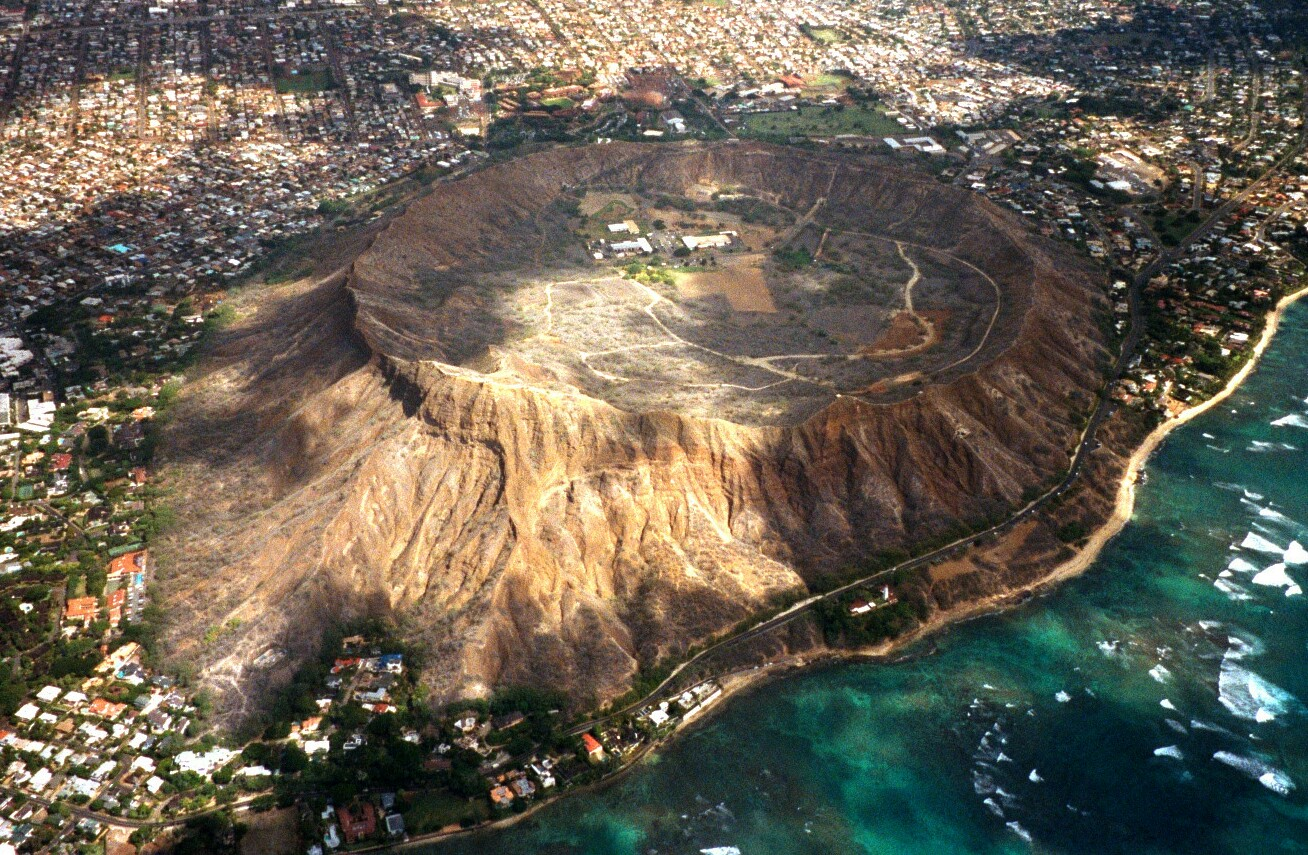
Filming took place on location on the island of Oahu, including at Diamond Head.

Filming for the two episodes began by March 5, 2017, in Downtown Honolulu, under the working title Project Next. Jeff Jur served as cinematographer on the episodes, and Jean Higgins as producer during filming. Studio work for the episodes took place in Kalaeloa, Hawaii at the former Naval Air Station Barbers Point airfield. Additional filming occurred at Diamond Head, and the Hawaii State Capitol building. Filming on both episodes lasted for 20 days.

The episodes were shot on Arri Alexa 65 IMAX 2D digital cameras, to accommodate a debut on IMAX screens. On shooting with the IMAX cameras, Reiné stated that "shaky handheld stuff doesn't really work for IMAX", so he chose "to move the cameras more forwards and backwards", which also helped capture the larger sets built. However, after seeing IMAX footage of Dunkirk that utilized handheld shots, Reiné was able to incorporate some in the episodes. Reiné received a list of lenses that Dunkirk director Christopher Nolan used, to help him understand how different lenses worked for the format. A new, wider lens was crafted for the cameras specifically for use on Inhumans, as Reiné was not happy with the widest lenses already available. He described the new lens as "beautifully distorted" and "something we've never seen before in IMAX". Reiné noted the crew spent the first three days of filming taking "a lot of different shots, that have different flavors, different lenses, different locations, different characters and we mixed them together in kind of a test" to screen on IMAX and assess how the project was turning out. Jur said that the IMAX lenses were "a little slower" than modern film lenses he was used to working with, but that they worked well with his tendency to "light up" sets rather than film in darker settings. Jur also noted that the IMAX cameras gave them more control over "how much is in focus in the background".

Reiné looked to balance the scale of IMAX with more traditional, "intimate" television direction. Marvel and ABC were reluctant to allow Reiné to film elements of the episodes in a more cinematic way in fear that they would not be able to change the style for the television-only episodes in the series if need be. Reiné convinced the studios to let him film each scene in multiple ways and then decide. He used three cameras for each shot, to get "rule shots", an ABC version, and his preferred version, and after seeing these takes, Marvel and ABC preferred Reiné's version. As an example, Reiné filmed a dialogue scene using traditional close-ups, but also did an "extreme version" where the camera moved 360 degrees around the characters as their movements were timed to the dialogue, which the studios preferred. Reiné also filmed different versions of scene transitions—specific shots were intended to end each act, before a commercial break, while different transitions were intended for the theatrical release where "the story has to continue".

=== Visual effects ===
The episodes feature over 600 visual effects shots, created by seven visual effects houses. Digital Media created many of the effects, while DNEG, who Reiné called "the best house to do creatures", provided the visuals for Lockjaw. DNEG began work on the character in early February 2017, before filming began, but did not receive approval on the final design for Lockjaw until April 2017, during filming of the series' fifth episode. For Lockjaw's teleportation effect, Reiné wanted "something really organic", and created sketches to pitch "the idea of how Lockjaw would organically dissolve into a sandburst", which Buck and Marvel both loved. Visual effects supervisor Eric Grenaudier noted that the team was trying to create effects that would hold up on an IMAX screen and be equivalent to those seen in the MCU films, but with a television budget and schedule. Reiné gave specific direction for Medusa's hair in each shot that it had to be animated, for instance, having it move away from her shoulder when Maximus touches it in one scene, and then moving it back when he leaves. Reiné was able to get all the effects shots that he wanted in the episodes.

=== Editing ===
Marvel, ABC, and IMAX had intended for Reiné to move on to other projects at the end of filming and leave them to put the episodes together, but Reiné insisted on remaining for the editing process. IMAX Entertainment CEO Greg Foster later praised this, saying that if the episodes were not designed and delivered for IMAX, "there's gonna be a series of problems that our fans aren't gonna like. There is no doubt that it's gonna take a little longer, and that's why having the director for a longer period of time exclusively devoted to this project was so critical to all of us." An edit of the two episodes intended for television and a version designed for the IMAX release were created. After filming versions of each scene that he felt were either more cinematic or more suited to traditional television, Reiné had the television version use more close-ups and the IMAX version focus more on showing scale. The two versions also used the different scene transitions that Reiné had filmed. The theatrical version totals 75 minutes, and the broadcast version 84 minutes. A majority of the additional content in the broadcast versions was a subplot for Louise as she investigates the missing rover on the Moon.

=== Music ===
Series composer Sean Callery created 70 minutes of music for the episodes, with a 68-piece orchestra, the largest he had ever worked with for television. Callery wrote an "adventurous" main theme for the series that was featured in full in the IMAX release, with a "very, very abridged version" used in the television versions. Versions of "Paint It Black" by The Rolling Stones and "Break on Through (To the Other Side)" by The Doors are featured in the episodes.

=== Marvel Cinematic Universe tie-ins ===
Reiné said during filming that a Marvel executive was on set to ensure whatever was done "would tie in with other characters in other universes, in other comics, in other series or movies... It was very collaborative. ... Nine out of ten times they liked what I pitched–even radical things." The Terrigen outbreak in Earth's water supply, as depicted in Agents of S.H.I.E.L.D., is mentioned, while the Kree hieroglyphic language also introduced on Agents of S.H.I.E.L.D. is seen.

== Marketing ==
A short teaser for the series was released ahead of Guardians of the Galaxy Vol. 2 IMAX screenings on its opening weekend in May 2017, as well as online. A full trailer for the series was screened exclusively at ABC's advertiser upfront presentation on May 17, with reactions praising the visuals for Lockjaw. The first public trailer was released on June 29, after footage had leaked online from ABC's upfront reveal. Darrell Etherington of TechCrunch felt it "looks like a dismal low-rent sci-fi trainwreck" and Mount "does a very bad job of acting in the few scenes he's in ... the sets look like they were put together from Stargate TV show lot sell-offs, hastily repainted." The trailer for io9's Charles Pulliam-Moore made him "confidently say that the show looks like it's going to be a mess." He noted that in the comics the Inhumans have "extremely melodramatic" stories, which would require the series to have "a deft writing hand and a sizable special effects budget. Judging from the looks of the trailer, though, a lot of that is going to be missing".

An extended trailer was shown at San Diego Comic-Con in 2017, before also being released online, and appeared before IMAX screenings of the film Dunkirk. Fans in attendance at the panel enjoyed the footage, with Swan feeling the positive fan response to the completed effects for Medusa's hair was "vindication". However, Katharine Trendacosta at io9 felt the footage only made the series "look a bit less terrible" and noted "all the dialogue in these scenes are stilted and stiff." Ethan Anderton with /Film enjoyed seeing Black Bolt communicate with sign language, but felt the footage was "more like a melodramatic soap opera" with "no power behind the drama" than something compelling like Game of Thrones. He also felt the fight choreography and editing were "clunky". For Medusa's hair, Anderton noted it "actually looks perfect when we see it animated in action... When her hair begins to move because of her heightened emotions, it looks natural and fantastic. But when it goes back to the practical wig, it looks abysmal." He concluded that the series is "trying to have a compelling power struggle, but it doesn't come through in the performances", comparing it to Hercules: The Legendary Journeys and Xena: Warrior Princess."

In August, Reiné said that he was not surprised by the reaction to the initial trailer because "it didn't give you the scope, it didn't give you a lot of secrets or visual effects. I felt it was a little bit too early because the visual effects were not ready—Medusa's hair was not ready." He felt the second trailer was better and was happy with the fan response to it. Around that time, the first episode was released for critics to view ahead of the series' Television Critics Association (TCA) press tour panel, but initial reactions posted online were shortly taken down. At the TCA event, Dungey said the show is "still a work in progress. We're really down to the wire on some of the special effects." Loeb reiterated this, responding to questions from critics of the first episode's quality not being "IMAX-centric" by saying, "the show you have seen is not the finished product". The panel was cut short by ABC, and was widely considered by critics in attendance to be "awkward" and "uncomfortable". Later in the month, a new teaser for the series focusing on the different characters appeared to show Medusa's hair having been "improved", though /Film's Hoai-Tran Bui felt that the teaser otherwise "doesn't do much more to convince me that this series won't be a hot mess ... [it] still seems to be suffering from its quick, shoddy production so that it could make the bewildering IMAX premiere".

RelishMix, which analyzes activity across all major social platforms, said the release strategy of the episodes in IMAX had confused fans, with some believing it to be a film rather than episodes of a television series. Of the fans aware of the IMAX premiere, many "expressed the notion that IMAX is too expensive and they will wait for the television premiere", while the service noted fan skepticism surrounding the characters and production value, and negative comparisons of the visual effects to those in the MCU films.

== Release ==
=== Theatrical ===
The theatrical version had its premiere in Los Angeles at Universal CityWalk on August 28, 2017, and debuted on 667 IMAX screens in 67 countries on September 1, 2017. It ran for two weeks, though, as with all IMAX releases, each theater can determine what it chooses to screen each week, resulting in Inhumans not remaining on IMAX screens at some theaters for the stated two weeks. The episodes premiered in IMAX theaters in Italy and Germany on September 15, and in Korea on September 22, eventually playing on more than 1,000 IMAX screens in over 74 countries. The producers worked with Marvel Studios so the theatrical debut of the series could be timed to not interfere with the release of any MCU films; the episodes were released between Spider-Man: Homecoming (July 7, 2017) and Thor: Ragnarok (November 3, 2017).

=== Broadcast ===
The episodes first aired in the United States on ABC as "Behold... The Inhumans" and "Those Who Would Destroy Us" on September 29, 2017. They featured 9 minutes of exclusive content not shown in the IMAX version. CTV aired the episodes in Canada. Sky One aired "Behold... The Inhumans" in the United Kingdom on October 25, 2017.

== Reception ==
=== Expectations ===
Foster said, ahead of the IMAX release, that the company expected Inhumans to be more successful at the box office than what they had previously released in the theatrical window beginning September 1, which was generally the re-release of an old film, but whether the project was considered a success or not would depend on its ratings performance on television. The hope was that regular IMAX customers who would not have watched the series on ABC would do so after being introduced to it with the theatrical release.

=== Box office ===
The IMAX presentation of the episodes grossed $3.5 million worldwide. It earned $500,000 on its opening day in the United States and Canada, and earned $1.36 million over the 4-day Labor Day weekend. Outside the United States and Canada, the episodes earned $1.1 million from 65 markets. Box office analyst Jeff Bock of Exhibitor Relations called the opening weekend earnings "ho-hum", believing average film-goers did not know what the series was, or "certainly didn't know it was debuting in theaters before its TV debut." The $3.5 million gross was considered a disappointment by IMAX, with IMAX CEO Rich Gelfond blaming the poor reception and gross on "misalignment of customer expectations": "Customers expected a production akin to a mega-budget blockbuster movie, rather than pilots for a television show. Moreover, the fact that this was Marvel IP set the bar at a level you wouldn't see from other pieces of content or IP because of the reputation and the high production value of Marvel movies."

=== Ratings ===
In the United States, for the television broadcast on ABC, the episodes received a 0.9/4 percent share among adults between the ages of 18 and 49, according to Nielsen Media Research. That means the episodes were seen by 0.9 percent of all households, and 4 percent of all of those watching television at the time of the broadcast. The two episodes were watched by 3.75 million viewers. Within a week of their broadcast, the episodes had been watched by 5.58 million U.S. viewers.

=== Critical response ===
IGN's Joshua Yehl gave the episodes a 4.0 out of 10, calling the episodes disappointing, not living up to the "usual Marvel standard". He felt the costumes and makeup looked like cosplay, the dialogue was "clunky", as if it was from the first draft of a script", and the story did not "have the scope, scale, or polish to make use of" the IMAX release. He also criticized the episode recap flashbacks halfway through the IMAX version, and felt that having Buck as showrunner, who also worked on the poorly reviewed first season of Iron Fist, "speaks volumes as to why Inhumans is just as misguided in its approach and execution." David Pepose of Newsarama also gave the episodes a 4 out of 10, feeling "Buck's instincts to rely more on his characters than on his plot is a good instinct—but because the acting and the production values seem so wooden, that makes the overall arc of this series seem more threadbare than ambitious". Pepose ultimately called the episodes aimless, with an obvious network television style and budget.

Writing for Digital Spy, Morgan Jeffrey also had negative thoughts on the episodes. Despite calling Mount "the show's MVP", enjoying the "visually epic" location shots of Hawaii and CGI vista, and feeling "the themes at the heart of the series [were] compelling, with plenty of potential," he took issue with the "flat, uninspired screenplay" from Buck. He concluded that Inhumans was "the weakest entry in the MCU to date, across screens big and small. A severe throwback to the mostly underwhelming comic book adaptations of the pre-Iron Man age, this looks to be a serious misstep". Giving the episodes a 1 out of 5, Kim Taylor-Foster of Fandom felt the episodes were "a massive letdown" and were "largely stripped of personality and flair". Taylor-Foster felt various moments in the episodes came across as funny, when they were not meant to be, the characters were underdeveloped, and the IMAX aspect of the episodes was "kind of wasted". Although she felt Lockjaw was the series "main saving grace", ultimately, "In concentrating on making a splash with its IMAX premiere, [the episodes] refuses to push boundaries in other, more important areas. [That] means a lackluster beginning to a series that was meant to wow."

Charles Pulliam-Moore from io9 had mixed feelings on the episodes, calling them "neither good nor bad", feeling they set up a "grand, sweeping narrative in which every major player is on a distinct personal journey that would make for an excellent season of television" but were hindered by the show's budget. Pulliam-Moore specifically noted how Attilan looked like badly rendered video game cutscenes, that interior scenes were clearly shot on a sound stage, and Medusa's hair movement seemed to be created with the caliber of special effects from a 1990s film. Giving the episodes a "C+", TVLine's Matt Webb Mitovich said the episodes felt "'small' and even claustrophobic at times, especially in the Attilan interiors. The city itself is 'Positano by way of cement mixer', an uninteresting mish-mash of blocky, CGI'd dwellings... Even Hawaii, where the Earth-bound action is set, looks a bit bland, save for some establishing flyover shots." He criticized the storytelling, such as the unclear depiction of Karnak's powers, but was more positive on the second episode.

Giving the episodes a "C−", Darren Franich of Entertainment Weekly felt they included every boring way to portray a fantasy civilization, and were already "stalling, or running out the clock... [Inhumans] represents all the worst instincts of Marvel's TV arm." Collider's Allison Keene gave the episodes 1 star out of 5, calling them "an incredible mess" and feeling the episodes got better when imagining them as a comedy. Keene felt some of the bright spots of the episodes were Lockjaw, and Medusa once she is exiled to Earth, but ultimately concluded, "Marvel's excessively miscalculated series is nearly performance art. It's theater of the absurd. Or maybe it's just a sloppy and hastily thrown together TV show to satisfy a corporate obligation". Maureen Ryan, writing for Variety, felt Iron Fist looked "like Citizen Kane next to this slapped-together, incoherent, cheap-looking mess... Even for those of us who review TV programs for a living, it's difficult to capture the breadth, depth and scope of Inhumans' awfulness... The characters are somehow less than one-dimensional, the story is beyond predictable, and everything looks cheaper than a Doctor Who serial from 40 years ago."
