= Death of the Inhumans =

2018 American comic book story arc

- Cover to Death of the Inhumans #1

Publication information
- Publisher: Marvel Comics
- Format: Limited series
- Genre: see below
- Publication date: July – November 2018
- No. of issues: 5
- Main character(s): Inhumans; Kree

Creative team
- Written by: Donny Cates
- Penciller: Ariel Olivetti
- Inker: Ariel Olivetti
- Letterer: Clayton Cowless
- Editor(s): Wil Moss; Sarah Brunstad; Tom Brevoort

Death of the Inhumans is a 2018 American comic book story arc published by Marvel Comics.

== Publication history ==
"Death of the Inhumans" was announced on March 28, 2018, as a project by Donny Cates and Ariel Olivetti scheduled to be released starting in July 2018 as a five-issue miniseries.

== Premise ==
The premise deals with the Kree plotting to get the Inhumans to join them by using a Super-Inhuman they created to kill some of them to serve as a warning to those who do not take up their offer.

== Plot ==
The Kree have initiated a murdering campaign in order to force Black Bolt to join the Kree empire. This ultimatum causes the deaths of 1,038 Inhumans, which forced Black Bolt to call together the four Queens of the Universal Inhuman tribes to respond to this threat. However, the meeting goes far from as planned, as Vox, a Super-Inhuman created by the Kree, begins his bloody rampage across the place. When Black Bolt, Medusa, Gorgon, Karnak, Crystal, Triton, and Lockjaw reach the meeting place, they find the queens dead. They eventually realize that the victims had fallen into a trap as one of the dead Inhumans was wired with an explosive. While most of Black Bolt's group make it out alive thanks to Lockjaw, Triton is killed in the explosion. Black Bolt then sends Lockjaw to New Arctilan to retrieve his brother Maximus. Unbeknownst to them, Vox and his men have already arrived on New Arctilan and begun murdering every Inhuman they come across. Lockjaw arrives and helps Maximus with his attempt to stop Vox on their own, but Vox fires an enormous blast, ripping a hole in both of them.

Black Bolt learns of this when he sees that Ronan has been converted into a cyborg. Elsewhere, Medusa and the surviving Inhuman Royal Family members try to recruit Beta Ray Bill in their fight against Vox and the Kree.

Triton is seen in stasis alongside Naja, Sterilon, and other unnamed Inhumans.

As Gorgon and Beta Ray Bill engage the Kree soldiers, Black Bolt, Medusa, and Karnak arrive at the laboratory, where they find Vox-controlled Inhumans like Crystal and Lockjaw. Knowing the truth about the prophecy, Black Bolt brings ruin to the Kree and unleashes his powers on the Vox-controlled Inhumans, killing them all. This action frees Crystal and Lockjaw from Vox's control. Gorgon and Beta Ray Bill arrive stating that the Kree have fled and see Crystal and Lockjaw still alive. Black Bolt emerges from the room as Medusa orders Lockjaw to take them away from the Kree base.

== Collected edition ==
| Title | Material Collected | Pages | Publication Date | ISBN |
|---|---|---|---|---|
| Death of the Inhumans | Death of the Inhumans #1-5 | 120 | January 20, 2019 | 978-1302913007 |
