= Triton (Marvel Comics) =

Operative of the Inhumans

- Triton as depicted in Secret Invasion - Inhumans #4; Art by Rich Buckler

Publication information
- Publisher: Marvel Comics
- First appearance: Fantastic Four #45 (December 1965)
- Created by: Stan Lee (writer); Jack Kirby (artist)

In-story information
- Alter ego: Unknown
- Species: Inhuman
- Place of origin: Attilan
- Team affiliations: Inhuman Royal Family; Deep Six
- Abilities: Superhuman strength, stamina, speed, durability, agility, and reflexes; Underwater breathing; Aquatic vision

Triton is a character appearing in American comic books published by Marvel Comics. Created by Stan Lee and Jack Kirby, the character first appeared in Fantastic Four #45 (December 1965). He belongs to the subspecies of humans called inhumans, who are born with superhuman abilities.

Triton made his live action debut in the Marvel Cinematic Universe television series Inhumans, portrayed by Mike Moh. Additionally, Mark Hamill, James Arnold Taylor, and Michael Sinterniklaas have voiced the character in animation.

== Publication history ==
He first appeared in Fantastic Four #45 (December 1965), and was created by Stan Lee and Jack Kirby.

== Fictional character biography ==
Triton is member of the Inhumans' royal family, son of Mander and Azur, brother to Karnak, and cousin to Gorgon, Black Bolt, Maximus, Medusa, and Crystal. Triton was born on the city-state island of Attilan and was exposed to the Terrigen Mist as an infant. The mists alter his body, giving him a fish-like appearance and allowing him to survive underwater. However, Triton is left unable to survive outside water and requires a special breathing apparatus to survive on land. The apparatus, cumbersome at first, was eventually reduced in size by Maximus. Due to Triton's condition, his parents disallow Karnak from undergoing Terrigenesis.

Triton participates in the Inhuman exodus when Attilan is relocated to Earth's moon. He grapples with the Avengers under Maximus's mind control. He accompanies Medusa to Earth when she flees Attilan to avoid compulsory abortion by order of the Genetic Council.

During the Secret Invasion storyline, the Inhumans form an alliance with the Kree to recover Black Bolt from the Skrulls. Together, they discover a weakness in the Skrulls' defense and split up to recover the resources to exploit it. Triton is sent to the oceanic planet Pelagia, where he encounters mermen-like beings who closely resemble him. He develops feelings for Pelagia native Dascylla. Although outnumbered by the hostile Pelagians, Triton manages to overcome them and find what he seeks. His breathing harness is then upgraded by the Kree, allowing him to operate in the vacuum of space.

During Civil War II, Triton grows discontent with Medusa's dovishness to Tony Stark's aggression against New Attilan. He enlists the help of Maximus to provoke Stark against Medusa to force her to attack. Maximus convinces Lash to attack one of Stark's factories, but it contains civilians. Captain Marvel and the Avengers attack Medusa, but during that time Stark attacks New Attilan. To Triton's shock, Maximus lowers Attilan's defenses, allowing Stark to enter. Medusa surrenders, but Triton gives himself up as it was his idea to free Maximus. S.H.I.E.L.D. takes him to the Triskelion prison.

During Inhumans vs. X-Men, Maximus frees Triton from the Triskelion with the promise of finding a way to recreate Terrigen Crystals. Triton, Lineage, and the Unspoken travel around the world gathering ingredients. Ultimately, Maximus instead creates a giant robot with a Terrigen sword to kill the X-Men, but the Unspoken attacked and absorbs the Terrigen sword. Triton vows to kill Maximus if he does not follow through with the plan, but decides against it as Maximus is the only one who knows the Terrigen formula.

In Death of the Inhumans, the Kree have murdered thousands of Inhumans who refuse to join them. Black Bolt requests a meeting with the four Queens of the Inhumans tribes to respond to this threat. When Triton tries to learn what transpired, he discovers that Black Bolt has been wired with an explosive which is activated when Triton touches him. Triton is apparently killed in the explosion, although most of the Royal Family is saved by Lockjaw's teleportation ability. Triton is alive and in stasis alongside Naja, Sterilon, and several unnamed Inhumans. Black Bolt is forced to kill Triton, among others, to stop the Kree.

During the Imperial storyline, Triton is revealed to have survived. He witnesses Black Bolt banish Maximus.

== Powers and abilities ==
Triton is a member of the Inhuman race, artificially mutated by the Terrigen Mist, giving him scaly greenish skin, a small dorsal fin running from the base of the skull to the forehead, membranous fins extending from his temples, and webbing between his toes and between his fingers. Triton is able to breathe water, to swim at great speeds, and to withstand the pressures of the deep sea. He cannot naturally breathe air and needs near-constant contact with water to survive, and cannot exist out of water without artificial aids. His resistance to deep sea pressure also gives him superhuman strength and speed underwater. He has the ability to survive underwater indefinitely, and the ability to withstand the temperature and pressure of ocean depths. His vision is more sensitive to the green portion of the visible spectrum, enabling him to see in relatively dark ocean depths.

Triton has undergone basic Inhuman royal militia training. When on land, Triton employs a water circulation system consisting of lengths of plastic tubing which run along his torso and limbs, maintaining a constant mist of water and providing a supply of fresh water to his gills.

== Reception ==
=== Accolades ===
- In 2020, Comic Book Resources (CBR) ranked Triton 17th in their "20 Most Powerful Inhumans" list.
- In 2021, Screen Rant included Triton in their "10 Most Powerful Members Of Marvel's Inhumans" list.
- In 2022, CBR ranked Triton 7th in their "10 Inhumans Who Should Join The Avengers" list.
- In 2022, Screen Rant ranked Triton 8th in their "Marvel's 10 Most Powerful Aquatic Characters" list.

== Other versions ==
Various alternate universe versions of Triton have appeared throughout the character's publication history. In the series Earth X, Triton possesses a serpentine, merman-like appearance. Triserinak, a composite character based on Triton, Karnak, and DC Comics character Serifan, appears in the Amalgam Comics universe.

== In other media ==
Character poster of Mike Moh as Triton for the television series, Inhumans.

=== Television ===
- Triton appears in Fantastic Four, voiced initially by Rocky Carroll and subsequently by Mark Hamill. This version only breathes water to survive, until it receives respiratory equipment created by Maximus.
- Triton appears in the Hulk and the Agents of S.M.A.S.H. episode "Inhuman Nature", voiced by James Arnold Taylor. This version does not require water to survive.
- Triton appears in Ultimate Spider-Man, voiced again by James Arnold Taylor. This version is an exchange student at the S.H.I.E.L.D. Academy.
- Triton makes a non-speaking cameo appearance in the Guardians of the Galaxy episode "Crystal Blue Persuasion".
- Triton makes a non-speaking cameo appearance in the Avengers Assemble episode "The Inhuman Condition".
- Triton appears in Inhumans, portrayed by Mike Moh.
- Triton appears in Marvel Future Avengers, voiced by Hiroyuki Yoshino in Japanese and Michael Sinterniklaas in English.

=== Video games ===
- Triton appears as a non-playable character in Marvel: Ultimate Alliance, voiced by Tom Kane.
- Triton appears in Marvel Avengers Academy.
- Triton appears as a playable character in Lego Marvel Super Heroes 2.
