= Lockjaw (character) =

Fictional character in Marvel Comics

- Lockjaw from Lockjaw and the Pet Avengers #4; Art by Karl Kerschl.

Publication information
- Publisher: Marvel Comics
- First appearance: Fantastic Four #45 (December 1965)
- Created by: Stan Lee (writer); Jack Kirby (artist)

In-story information
- Species: Inhuman Bulldog
- Place of origin: Attilan
- Team affiliations: Inhumans; Fantastic Four; Pet Avengers
- Notable aliases: Sparky
- Abilities: Super-canine strength in his jaw; Super-canine durability; Matter ingestion; Teleportation; Precognition

Lockjaw is a character in American comic books published by Marvel Comics. Created by Stan Lee and Jack Kirby, the character first appeared in Fantastic Four #45 (December 1965). He is an Inhuman giant bulldog whose abilities include teleportation. He serves the Inhuman Royal Family as their escort and a loyal protector.

Lockjaw has been described as one of Marvel's most notable and powerful animal heroes.

Lockjaw made his live-action debut in the 2017 Marvel Cinematic Universe (MCU) television series Inhumans.

== Publication history ==
He first appeared in Fantastic Four #45 (December 1965), and was created by Stan Lee and Jack Kirby.

== Fictional character biography ==
Lockjaw was born on the island of Attilan (formerly located in the Atlantic Ocean and eventually moved to the Moon). At times, his powers have been manipulated by evil forces, most usually by Maximus. Lockjaw and the Royal Family encountered Maximus' creation, the Trikon, and were driven from Attilan's Great Refuge in exile.

Lockjaw first appeared as a member of the Inhumans when they attempted to retrieve Medusa from the outside world and take her back to Attilan. This led them into conflict with the Fantastic Four, the first humans they met, who were harboring Medusa after rescuing her from the villainous Frightful Four. Accordingly, Lockjaw is indirectly responsible for revealing the existence of Attilan to the outside world. They returned to Attilan and became trapped in Maximus' barrier around the Great Refuge.

Lockjaw is able to escape and becomes separated from his city. He roams the country for some time, accidentally terrorizing the local citizens, until he meets up with the Human Torch and Wyatt Wingfoot. He journeyed with the pair in their attempt to breach the "negative zone" barrier. Before long, the Inhumans were freed from the "negative zone" barrier, and Lockjaw transported Crystal to New York, and brought Triton from Attilan to rescue Mister Fantastic. Lockjaw was later compelled to return Crystal to Attilan by Maximus.

At one point, Quicksilver and the Thing witness what appeared to be Lockjaw, apparently a sentient being once mutated by Terrigen Mist, speaking to them. This convinces Quicksilver not to expose his daughter Luna to the Mists. Lockjaw brings Quicksilver to Washington, D.C., in search of X-Factor, where Quicksilver states that Lockjaw's sentience was actually a hoax perpetrated by Karnak and Gorgon.

Lockjaw is featured into the 2006 limited series Son of M. With the majority of the mutants on Earth having been rendered powerless, Quicksilver decides to steal the Terrigen Mists and re-power mutants. Lockjaw is convinced to help him on the mission. Traveling with Quicksilver's daughter Luna, they traverse the Earth, heading to such places as Genosha. The other Inhumans follow.

In 2009, Lockjaw received a four-issue mini-series titled Lockjaw and the Pet Avengers, teaming with Lockheed, Redwing, Ms. Lion (Aunt May's puppy from Spider-Man and His Amazing Friends), Zabu, Robbie Baldwin's cat Niels, and a new frog named Throg. This series involves Lockjaw bringing the Infinity Gauntlet together with the assistance of animal allies. The series spawned two additional mini-series with the Pet Avengers.

During the "War of Kings" storyline, Lockjaw re-joins his Inhuman family for the conflicts that eventually led to them taking over the Kree empire. This leads to the seeming loss of Black Bolt despite Crystal and Lockjaw's efforts. This conflict also leads to the ravaging of the Shi'ar empire. As his family determines who will rule, Lockheed is seen playing closely with Luna and assisting with Shi'ar recovery efforts. Lockjaw again becomes involved with gathering the Infinity Gauntlet together when the Soul Gem is lost and later found. Lockjaw is sent by Medusa to keep an eye on recent Inhuman Kamala Khan.

== Powers and abilities ==
Lockjaw can teleport himself and nearby living creatures and matter to any destination on the Earth or the Moon. He can also open passages between dimensions. Energy barriers that are seemingly impenetrable to others seem to pose no problem to him. Lockjaw also has the ability to psionically trace a given "scent" across dimensional space. Lockjaw also once seemingly sensed danger from far off, when Doctor Doom had manipulated Silver Surfer's powers. Lockjaw seemingly has "super-canine" strength in his jaw. Once he locked on to the Thing's arm, and he could not get him to let go.

In the Secret Invasion: Inhumans mini-series, the Royal Family ally with the Kree to free Black Bolt from his Skrull captors. To that end, the Kree greatly enhance Lockjaw's teleportation powers, enabling him to teleport himself and others over vast interplanetary distances.

== Cultural impact and legacy ==
=== Critical reception ===
Liz Wyatt of CBR.com referred to Lockjaw as one of Marvel's "fan favorite animal companions," stating, "Lockjaw is perhaps the cutest Inhuman out there...though we might be biased on that count. Lockjaw is not only extremely adorable, loyal, and okay...he's massive as well, but he's also very useful. You see, Lockjaw can teleport almost as well as he can drool. Which is saying something! Lockjaw is a massive bulldog, and an Inhuman to boot. He's made friends and allies with more than one Marvel character, and we're not surprised by that fact. This is one dog who has plenty of room for love in his heart. And that is why we love him so much." Chase Magnett of ComicBook.com called Lockjaw "one of the longest-lasting and most beloved super pets in existence," writing, "The bottom line with Lockjaw is that he's a very good dog. One of the best. If there were a We Rate Dogs Twitter in the Marvel universe, it would almost certainly give Lockjaw a 15/10. As a character, he reminds us of everything we love about our canine companions with an extra dose of superheroic powers and adventure on top. Lockjaw is loyal and loving, filled with fun, and there whenever his people need him. Whether you have a dog in your home or prefer to admire them from afar, the appeal of the species is obvious when looking at this big, jowled face. He's just such a good dog." CA Staff of ComicsAlliance asserted, "It's hard to imagine anyone not loving Lockjaw. He's a huge puppy dog who teleports you to where you need to go! He's so smart that for a while the story was that he wasn't a dog at all—but thankfully that was retconned, because Lockjaw is the best dog, and not letting him be one kind of ruins him. He's loyal to the Inhuman Royal Family—he even has a tuning fork on his head to match his master—but he's also spent time with the Thing and Ms. Marvel, two of Marvel's best characters. who are made even better with Lockjaw around. He may not star in many stories of his own, but if you could magically wish one comics character to life and hang out with them, Lockjaw would be an excellent choice." Simon Winter of WhatCulture said, "Despite being a dog, Lockjaw is by far the best member of the Inhumans. As 'Companion to the Royal Family of the Inhumans', Lockjaw plays an important part in keeping New Attilan safe from the countless threats it faces. However, if you think he's just a giant slobbering eating machine... Well, you'd be mostly right, but there's way more to this lovable mutt than meets the eye. In one of Marvel's greatest decisions, Lockjaw got his own Avengers team in 2009's Lockjaw and the Pet Avengers."

=== Accolades ===
- In 2009, TIME included Lockjaw in their "Top 10 Oddest Marvel Characters" list.
- In 2014, ComicBook.com ranked Lockjaw 7th in their "10 Greatest Animals in Comics" list.
- In 2015, IGN included Lockjaw in their "7 Inhumans We Want on Agents of S.H.I.E.L.D." list.
- In 2016, ComicsAlliance ranked Lockjaw 1st in their "Marvel's Royal Inhumans, Ranked From Worst To Best" list.
- In 2017, ComicBook.com included Lockjaw in their "8 Best Dogs in Superhero Comics" list.
- In 2019, Comic Book Resources (CBR) ranked Lockjaw 2nd in their "15 Coolest Pets In Comic Books" list and 5th in their "Marvel: 10 Fan Favorite Animal Companions" list.
- In 2019, Gizmodo ranked Lockjaw 12th in their "30 Very Good Sci-Fi Dogs" list.
- In 2020, CBR ranked Lockjaw 9th in their "10 Most Iconic Pets In Marvel Comics" list.
- In 2020, WhatCulture included Lockjaw in their "10 Marvel Pets You Wish You Could Adopt" list.
- In 2022, Screen Rant included Lockjaw in their "Super-Pets: The 10 Best From DC & Marvel" list and in their "10 Best Animal Characters Who Should Join The MCU" list.
- In 2022, Sportskeeda ranked Lockjaw 3rd in their "Top 5 comic book pets" list.
- In 2022, Syfy ranked Lockjaw 6th in their "Marvel and DC's super pets, ranked" list.
- In 2022, Collider included Lockjaw in their "10 Most Iconic Super-Pets in Comics" list.
- In 2022, The A.V. Club included Lockjaw in their "21 top superhero pets" list.
- In 2022, CBR ranked Lockjaw 2nd in their "15 Coolest Pets In Comic Books" list.

== Literary reception ==
=== Volumes ===
==== Lockjaw and the Pet Avengers - 2009 ====
Marvel Comics announced that Lockjaw and the Pet Avengers #1 sold out in March 2009.

Doug Zawisza of CBR.com called Lockjaw and the Pet Avengers #1 an "all ages tour de force," stating, "Branded with an "All Ages" tag, this book is one for all ages—older fans of the Walter Simonson era of "Thor", fans of "Spider-Man and His Amazing Friends", X-Men fans, or just Marvel comics enthusiasts. This book serves as a reminder that not every comic needs to be hard-coded into continuity, so put that slide rule down and grab a copy of this book, as it brings an enthusiastic story to readers of the Marvel Universe. [...] This is a title that has come out of nowhere and deserves some recognition as it takes less than Z-list characters and offers an enjoyable tale that can be shared with long-term fans and younger readers alike. Eliopoulos gives of these characters each a voice and a reason to join up, but among them Lockheed really touched me in a way I hadn't thought of much before now." Daniel Crown of IGN gave Lockjaw and the Pet Avengers #1 a grade of 6.5 out of 10, asserting, "Ultimately, it's somewhat refreshing to see a child-friendly title like this one firmly set in the Marvel mythos proper. Lord knows the comic industry, and specifically the superhero genre, needs more all-ages comics. And to that end, Lockjaw and the Pet Avengers is just cute enough to skate by for adult readers, and should be more than acceptable for any little tyke who makes it a habit to ride their father or mother's leg into the comic store every Wednesday."

==== Lockjaw and the Pet Avengers Unleashed - 2010 ====
According to Diamond Comics Distributors, Lockjaw and the Pet Avengers Unleashed #1 was the 195th best selling comic book in March 2010.

Doug Zawisza of CBR.com said, "The Pets are fabulously rendered by Ig Guara, the artistic beast master from the previous series. Guara, thankfully, has returned for another go at the Pets, bringing expression and emotion to these critters while never failing to deliver fantastic backgrounds, foregrounds, and cursory characters. This issue only has two panels with human beings in it, but with Guara drawing Eliopoulos' story, there is certainly no shortage of characterization. Sotomayor and Roberts color the living daylights out of this book, making the frogs look like amphibians, and setting off Ms. Lion's fur, giving each animal an almost tangible difference in their appearance. Sabino's lettering is equally well-suited to this story, giving many of the animals a different tone and tenor. The rumble of the hippos is different from the resonance of Hairball's speech. The mystery of Frog Thor coupled with the last page reveal are a bit more than one would expect from an "All Ages" book, but it just proves that this is truly "All Ages" and not "intended for younger readers, but hoping older readers think it's cute enough to pay for." Well done, I say. A single page Hulk-Pet Avengers story ends this issue with the characters teaming up with Blue Hulk to go to Ice Cream Mountain. It's silly and fun, and nice little extra for the younger readers written by Audrey Loeb and drawn by Dario Brizuela." Kevin Lee of Screen Rant included the Lockjaw and the Pet Avengers Unleashed comic book series in their "10 best super-pets comics storylines" list, saying, "A thought-provoking follow-up to Lockjaw and the Pet Avengers (2009), Unleashed #1-4 (2010) sees the Pet Avengers assemble when their mystical connection to Throg is lost. Eventually, they track Throg down, discovering the warped Golden One is destroying the mythical realm and plotting an incursion into the Earth realm. The dynamic creator duo of Super Pets, Eliopoulos and Guara, come together in this imaginative tale of finding oneself, friends, and the power of love when fueled by imagination."

==== Lockjaw - 2018 ====
According to Diamond Comics Distributors, Lockjaw #1 was the 139th best selling comic book in February 2018. Lockjaw #2 was the 190th best selling comic book in March 2018.

Brandon Davis of ComicBook.com gave Lockjaw #1 a grade of 4 out of 5, stating, "A tale of man's best friend kicks off as Lockjaw branches from the reins of Black Bolt and his Attilan home for a planet-trotting adventure. Daniel Kibblesmith pairs the oversized teleporting pup with once-hero D-Man for an adventure which will certainly teach them to rely on each other, possibly one more than the other, in an unnecessary but potentially quite fun adventure." Jesse Schedeen of IGN gave Lockjaw #1 a grade of 8.6 out of 10, saying, "By now readers should have a certain idea of what to expect from a comic about Lockjaw. He's a gigantic, teleporting dog with a habit of getting into wacky adventures when he isn't busy teleporting the Inhumans to and fro. Tonally, we're not exactly talking The Dark Knight Returns here. But while this new miniseries is every bit as goofy as one would expect, it also manages to weave in a surprising amount of emotional depth in the process. [...] It's understandable if readers are feeling burnt out on the Inhumans at this point. However, Lockjaw #1 offers an entertaining diversion from the norm that places more emphasis on Lockjaw's new partner than the trusty canine himself. This issue delivers all the wacky superhero fun one would expect, but it anchors that fun with a surprisingly deep look at a fallen hero in crisis."

== Other versions ==
=== Age of Apocalypse ===
An alternate universe version of Lockjaw appears in Age of Apocalypse.

=== Earth X ===
In the alternate future of Earth X, Lockjaw is killed by Maximus. Black Bolt and the Inhumans recover his harness and use it to investigate happenings on Earth.

=== Marvel Knights 2099 ===
Lockjaw is one of the few Royal family members to survive to the year 2099; Maximus had slain the rest. The Inhumans had established themselves on a space station also called Attilan.

=== Marvel Zombies ===
A zombified alternate universe version of Lockjaw appears in Marvel Zombies.

=== Ultimate Marvel ===
An alternate universe version of Lockjaw appears in Ultimate Fantastic Four Annual #1.

== In other media ==
Character poster featuring Lockjaw for the Marvel Cinematic Universe (MCU) television series, Inhumans

=== Television ===
- Lockjaw appears in The New Fantastic Four episode "Blastaar, the Living Bomb Burst".
- Lockjaw appears in Fantastic Four (1994).
- Lockjaw appears in Hulk and the Agents of S.M.A.S.H..
- Lockjaw appears in Ultimate Spider-Man.
- Lockjaw appears in Guardians of the Galaxy.
- Lockjaw appears in Avengers Assemble.
- Lockjaw appears in Inhumans.
- Lockjaw appears in Marvel Future Avengers, with vocal effects provided by Aaron LaPlante.
- Lockjaw appears in Spidey and His Amazing Friends, with vocal effects provided by Dee Bradley Baker. This version is Kamala Khan's pet.

=== Film ===
Lockjaw appears in the Marvel Rising film series, with vocal effects provided by Dee Bradley Baker. This version is Kamala Khan's pet and a member of the Secret Warriors.

=== Video games ===
- Lockjaw appears as a non-playable character in Marvel: Ultimate Alliance.
- Lockjaw appears as a non-playable character in Marvel: Contest of Champions.
- Lockjaw appears as a playable character in Lego Marvel Super Heroes 2.
- Lockjaw appears as a playable character in Marvel Puzzle Quest.
- A statue of Lockjaw appears in Spider-Man (2018). The developers originally intended to include the Charging Bull sculpture, but replaced it with Lockjaw to avoid legal issues.
- Lockjaw appears in Marvel Ultimate Alliance 3: The Black Order, with vocal effects provided by Adam Harrington.
- Lockjaw appears in Marvel Snap.

=== Non-fiction ===
- The debate over Lockjaw's sentience is discussed in Peter David's non-fiction book Writing For Comics, where David relates how he tried to go with Stan Lee and Jack Kirby's original assertion that Lockjaw was a 'dumb animal'.
- Lockjaw appears in a Casey at the Bat parody in The Penguin Book of Comics, where he accompanies Crystal to the baseball game.

== Collected editions ==
Title	Material collected	Published date	ISBN
Lockjaw & The Pet Avengers	Lockjaw & The Pet Avengers #1-4, Tales of the Pet Avengers, Marvel Pets Handbook	November 2009	978-0785142713
Lockjaw & The Pet Avengers Unleashed	Lockjaw & The Pet Avengers Unleashed #1-4, material from Tails Of The Pet Avengers: The Dogs Of Summer	September 2010	978-0785143048
Lockjaw: Who's a Good Boy?	Lockjaw #1-4, Thing (vol. 2) #4, material from Girl Comics (vol. 2) #2, Original Sins #1, Inhumans: Once and Future Kings #1-5	September 2018	978-1302912529
