= Isabelle Cornish =

Australian actress and model (born 1994)

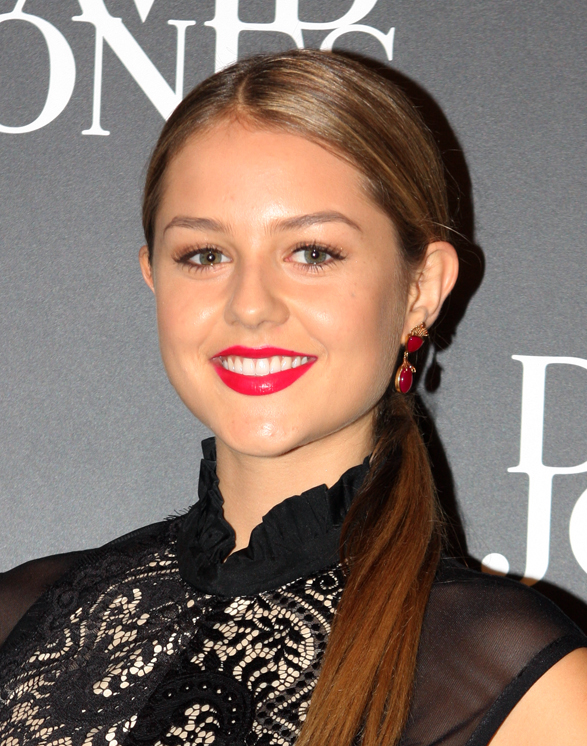
- Cornish in 2013
- Born: 22 July 1994 (age 32)
- Occupations: Actress, model
- Years active: 2011–present
- Relatives: Abbie Cornish (sister)

Isabelle Cornish (born 22 July 1994) is an Australian actress and model. She is best known for her television roles, particularly in Puberty Blues and Home and Away, and Crystal in the 2017 American television series Inhumans.

== Early life ==
She is the younger sister of actress Abbie Cornish. Her parents are Shelley and Barry Cornish. Isabelle has also modelled. She attended the Hunter School of the Performing Arts.

== Career ==
From March 2012, Cornish had a recurring role in Home and Away as Christy Clarke. In early 2014, the actress filmed a drama pilot called Sea of Fire in Vancouver. In March 2017, Cornish was cast as Crystal in the Marvel comics television series Inhumans which briefly aired on the American television network ABC.

== Personal life ==
Cornish is a vegetarian, but was previously vegan (as at 2014). She was voted as Australia's sexiest vegetarian celebrity in 2013.

== Filmography ==
=== Film ===
Year	Title	Role	Notes
2012	Arc	Sophie	Short film
2017	Australia Day	Chloe Patterson	Feature film

=== Television ===
Year	Title	Role	Notes
2011	Rescue: Special Ops	Lily Regan	Episode: "Secrets and Lies"
2012	Dance Academy	Elke	Episodes: "Faux Pas De Deux", "Connectivity"
2012	Home and Away	Christy Clarke	Recurring role, 6 episodes
2012–2014	Puberty Blues	Vicki	Main role, 17 episodes
2017	Inhumans	Crystal	Main role, 8 episodes
2021	Nine Perfect Strangers	Lulu	Recurring role, 6 episodes
2021	SAS Australia: Who Dares Wins	Contestant	Season 2

== Accolades ==
The actress was crowned Australia's Prettiest Vegetarian 2013 by PETA Australia.
