= Tanya Clarke =

American actress

- Born: February 2, 1972 (age 54); Chicago, Illinois, U.S.
- Occupation: Actress
- Years active: 1994–present
- Children: 1

Tanya Clarke (born February 2, 1972) is an American film, television, and stage actress, known for her role as Nicole Brennan in the Dead Space franchise.

== Early life ==
Clarke was born on February 2, 1972, in Chicago while her father, Tony Clarke, completed his doctorate degree in Social Ethics at the University of Chicago. The elder of two children, she was raised in Ottawa, Ontario, Canada.

Clarke moved to New York City at the age of 20 and spent many years performing on Broadway, Off-Broadway and regional stages. She is engaged to actor Michael Buie and has a daughter, Lola.

== Career ==
Her film credits include A Beautiful Mind and Tenderness with Russell Crowe, Repo Men (2010), DriverX & Blackbird. She was also in I Can Only Imagine with Dennis Quaid.

Her television roles include the portrayal of Emily Lotus on Cinemax's Banshee and Queen Reyna on Marvel's Marvel's Inhumans. Other: Grey's Anatomy, first and ninth season of American Horror Story, Glee, Hawaii Five-0, CSI: Miami, Supernatural, and Major Crimes.

She made her Broadway debut in I'm Not Rappaport opposite Judd Hirsch and Ben Vereen, directed by Daniel Sullivan. Off-Broadway credits include The Director' with John Shea. Her Liquid Light sculptures have been featured in galleries, museums and private collections in the U.S. and around the world.

Clarke also voiced the NPC Nicole Brennan in Dead Space 2 and the 2023 remake of the first game.

== Selected filmography ==
=== Television ===
Year	Title	Role	Notes
1997–2001	One Life to Live	Nurse Betty	8 episodes
1997–2006	Guiding Light	Wendy	8 episodes
2002–2005	As the World Turns	Shelby Johnson / Patricia Latham	19 episodes
2009	NCIS: Los Angeles	Magda McEllon	Guest star
2011	The Defenders	Carly Donovan	Guest star
2011	American Horror Story: Murder House	Marla McClaine	Guest star
2011	Glee	Mary Evans	Guest star
2012	Hawaii Five-0	Karen Whitfield	Guest star
2013	Emily Owens, M.D.	Karen Ballard	Guest star
2013	Supernatural	Nora	Guest star
2015	Banshee	Emily Lotus	Recurring role
2015	Grey's Anatomy	Elaine Walton	Guest star
2016	Major Crimes	Bella Pond	Guest star
2017	Inhumans	Queen Rynda	Recurring role
2018	Room for Murder / The Boarder	Moira	Lifetime MOW
2019	The Matchmaker Mysteries: A Killer Engagement	Rachel	Hallmark MOW
2019	American Horror Story: 1984	Lorraine Richter	Guest star
2020	Tribal	Madeline Jones	Guest star
2021	Locke & Key	Carole Hawkings	Guest star
2022	9-1-1: Lone Star	Angie	Guest star
2024	Dexter: Original Sin	Nurse Mary	Guest Star

=== Film ===
Year	Film	Role	Notes
2001	A Beautiful Mind	Becky	
2004	The Best Thief in the World	Mary	
2009	Tenderness	Jackie Cristofuoro	
2009	Rise of the Gargoyles	Carol Beckham	
2012	Repo Men	Jill	
2012	Blackbird	Paula	
2017	DriverX	Dawn Moore	
2018	I Can Only Imagine	Adele	
2024	A Novel Noel	Nancy	

=== Video games ===
Year	Title	Role	Notes
2002	The Getaway	Cop Radio / Cop / Pedestrian	
2011	Dead Space 2	Nicole Brennan	Voice and likeness
2023	Dead Space	Nicole Brennan	Voice and likeness
