= Ken Leung =

American actor (born 1970)

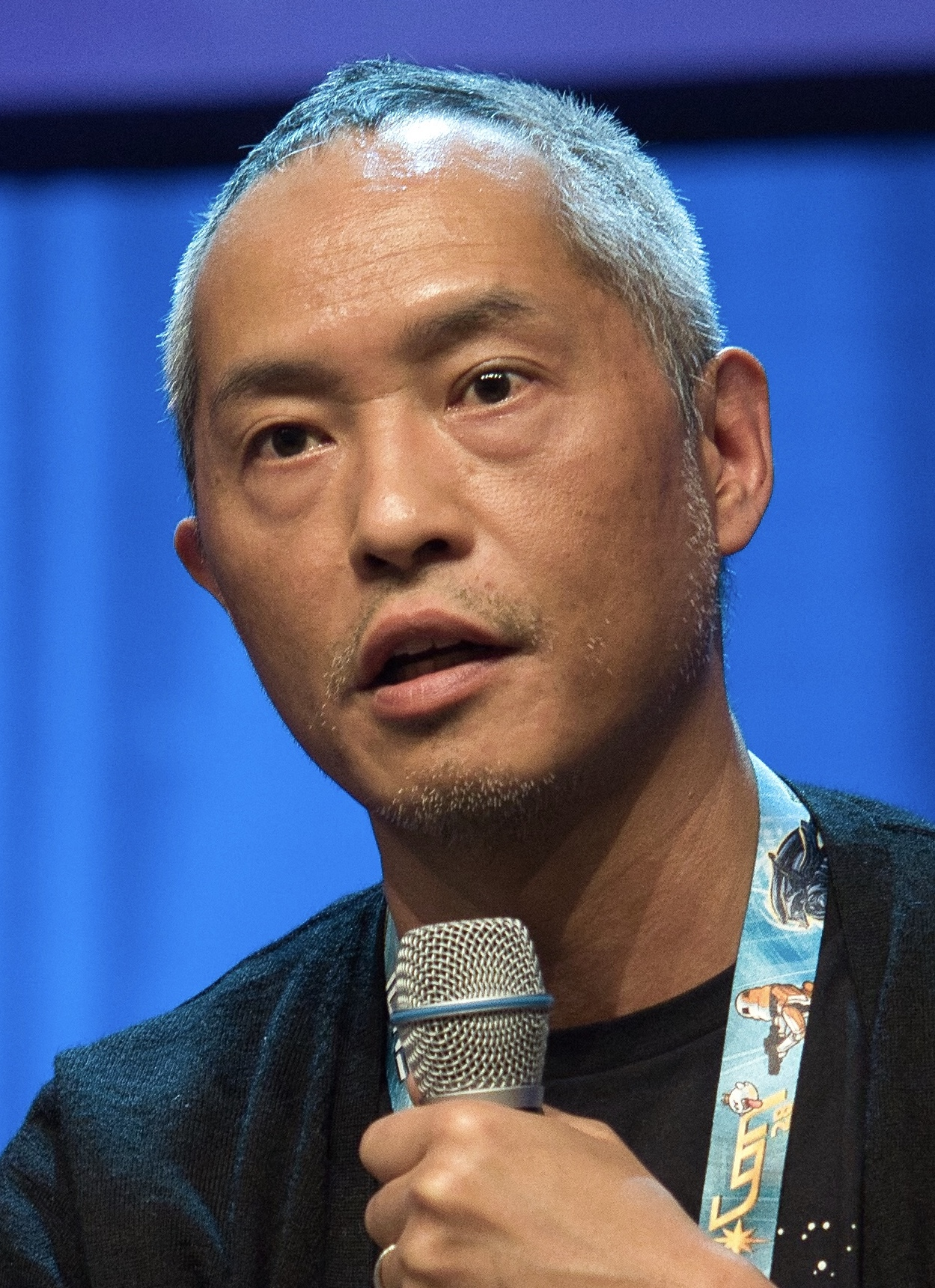
- Leung in 2019
- Born: January 21, 1970 (age 56); New York City, U.S.
- Education: New York University
- Occupation: Actor
- Years active: 1995–present
- Spouse: Nancy Bulalacao
- Children: 1

Chinese name
- Traditional Chinese: 梁振邦
- Simplified Chinese: 梁振邦
Transcriptions
Standard Mandarin
- Hanyu Pinyin: Liáng Zhènbāng
Yue: Cantonese
- Jyutping: Loeng4 Zan3 Bong1

Kenneth Leung (born January 21, 1970) is an American actor. Known for his roles on stage and screen, he has gained attention for playing Miles Straume in the ABC drama series Lost (2008–10) and Eric Tao in the HBO drama series Industry (2020–present).

Leung has had roles in television shows such as the CBS crime series Person of Interest (2012–13), the NBC medical series The Night Shift (2014–15), and the Marvel Television series Inhumans (2017) as well as notable guest roles on the HBO crime series The Sopranos (2007) and the CBS legal series The Good Wife (2011). He also played in supporting roles in Rush Hour (1998), A.I. Artificial Intelligence (2001), Red Dragon (2002), Saw (2004), The Squid and the Whale (2005), Inside Man (2006), Star Wars: The Force Awakens (2015), Old (2021) and Project Hail Mary (2026).

On stage, Leung made his Broadway debut playing a Chinese immigrant in the musical revival Thoroughly Modern Millie (2002). He has also taken roles in the Terrence McNally play Corpus Christi (1998) and the Dustin Lance Black play 8 (2011).

== Early life and education ==
Leung was born on January 21, 1970, in New York City, to Chinese parents, and was initially raised in the Two Bridges section of the Lower East Side of Manhattan. His family moved to Midwood, Brooklyn, where he grew up before finishing high school in Old Bridge, New Jersey. Leung had a brother, Kevin, who drowned in Thailand in 2013.

Leung attended New York University studying physical therapy. He discovered acting in his junior year, studying with Catherine Russell and Nan Smithner, and then briefly with Anne Jackson at HB Studio. During this time, he acted mostly in downtown spaces and black box theaters, working with groups such as Ma-Yi Theater Company, New Perspectives, and STAR, a troupe of actors-educators based at Mount Sinai Hospital in 2002.

== Career ==
=== 1998–2007: Early roles ===
In 1998, Leung made his debut as the villainous henchman Sang opposite Jackie Chan and Chris Tucker in Brett Ratner's Rush Hour. He would later work with Ratner in the films Red Dragon, The Family Man, and X-Men: The Last Stand. Edward Norton cast Leung in his directorial debut Keeping the Faith in 2000. Norton stated that Leung turned a tiny role into one of the movie's most hilarious moments – so much so that the filmmakers expanded the scene because audiences laughed so hard.

In 1998, he played James the Less and God in Terrence McNally's passion play, Corpus Christi, and in 2002 made his Broadway debut in the musical Thoroughly Modern Millie, also appearing on the cast recording. In 2007, he starred in the independent film Shanghai Kiss, with Hayden Panettiere and earned a Special Mention at the San Francisco International Asian American Film Festival. That same year, Leung guest-starred in the final season of the HBO drama series The Sopranos.

=== 2008–present: Lost and Industry ===
From 2007, he starred as Miles Straume in 45 episodes of the ABC drama Lost, from the series' fourth season, through the rest of its run. From 2014, Leung starred as Topher Zia in the series The Night Shift.

In 2020, Leung began playing a main role in HBO's Industry as Eric Tao, a Managing Director (MD) on the Cross Product Sales (CPS) desk at Pierpoint. The show's creators stated that Leung is "one of the great actors of his generation, 100%...He’s out of this world.” Leung attracted attention online for his distinctive screen presence as Eric Tao. Yahoo News noted that some users that searched for popular GIFs of Leung used the phrase "strict Asian Obama" when they did not know Leung's name, due to the two sharing similar appearances and mannerisms.

In 2024, he played Commander Zhao in the Netflix series Avatar: The Last Airbender.

== Personal life ==
Leung speaks Cantonese. He is married to Nancy Bulalacao, a curator for public programs for Asian American and Pacific Islander communities, who is of Filipina descent. They have one son, born in 2015, and reside in Brooklyn.

== Filmography ==
=== Film ===
Year	Title	Role	Notes/Ref.
1995	Pictures of Baby Jane Doe	Shopkeeper	
1995	Welcome to the Dollhouse	Barry	
1997	Red Corner	Peng	
1997	Kundun		Voice
1998	Fly	Jeremy Kim	
1998	Rush Hour	Sang	
1999	Man of the Century	Mike Ramsey	
2000	Keeping the Faith	Don	
2000	Maze	Dr. Mikao	
2000	The Family Man	Sam Wong	
2001	A.I. Artificial Intelligence	Syatyoo-Sama	
2001	Home Sweet Hoboken		
2001	Spy Game	Li	
2001	Vanilla Sky	Art Editor	
2002	Face	Willie	
2002	Red Dragon	Lloyd Bowman	
2004	Saw	Detective Steven Sing	
2005	The Squid and the Whale	School Therapist	
2006	Falling for Grace	Ming Tang	
2006	Inside Man	Wing	
2006	X-Men: The Last Stand	Quill	Incorrectly credited as Kid Omega
2007	Year of the Fish	Johnny	
2007	Shanghai Kiss	Liam Liu	
2009	Works of Art	John Kim	
2015	Star Wars: The Force Awakens	Admiral Statura	
2021	Old	Jarin Carmichael	
2023	Missing	Kevin Lin	
2024	Joker: Folie à Deux	Dr. Victor Liu	
2025	Last Days	Patrick	
2026	Project Hail Mary	Yáo Li-Jie	

=== Television ===
Year	Title	Role	Notes
1995, 2000, 2002	Law & Order	Forensic Technician Chung	Episodes: "Progeny" and "Jeopardy"
1995, 2000, 2002	Law & Order	Stephen Wong	Episode: "Narcosis"
1995, 2000, 2002	Law & Order	Tommy Wong	Episode: "The Wheel"
1997	New York Undercover	David Kwan	Episode: "Vendetta"
2000	Wonderland		Episode: "Spell Check"
2000	Deadline	Fung	Episode: "Pilot"
2001	Oz	Bian Yixue	Episode: "Conversions"
2004	The Jury	Ken Arata	Episode: "Memories"
2004	Whoopi	Terrence	Episode: "Identity Crisis"
2004	Strip Search	Liu Tsung-Yuan	Television film
2004	Sucker Free City	Lincoln Ma	Television film
2005	Hate	Mo	Television film
2007	The Sopranos	Carter Chong	Episode: "Remember When"
2008–2010	Lost	Miles Straume	Series regular; 45 episodes
2011	The Good Wife	Shen Yuan	Episode: "Great Firewall"
2012–2013	Person of Interest	Leon Tao	4 episodes
2013	Zero Hour	Father Reggie	8 episodes
2013	Deception	Donald Cheng	2 episodes
2014–2016	The Night Shift	Topher Zia	Main role (seasons 1–3); 35 episodes
2017	Inhumans	Karnak	Main cast; 8 episodes
2019–2020	High Maintenance	Gene	3 episodes
2019	The Blacklist	Michael Sima	6 episodes
2020–present	Industry	Eric Tao	Main role
2022–2023	Pantheon	Bai Fu / additional voices	Voice; 4 episodes
2023	Strange Planet	Bartender	Voice; episode: "Careful Now"
2023–2024	Velma	Darren	Voice; 5 episodes
2024	Avatar: The Last Airbender	Commander Zhao	Main role (season 1)
TBA	Superfakes	Don	

== Theatre ==
Year	Title	Role	Venue	Ref.
1994	The Goong Hay Kid	The Goong Hay Kid	Nuyorican Poets Café, Off-Broadway	
1998	Corpus Christi	James	Manhattan Theatre Club, Off-Broadway	
2002	Thoroughly Modern Millie	Ching Ho	Marquis Theatre, Broadway	
2011	8	Dr. William Tam	Eugene O'Neill Theatre, Broadway	
2022	Evanston Salt Costs Climbing	Basil	Pershing Square Signature Center, Off-Broadway	
