= Eme Ikwuakor =

American actor (born 1984)

- Born: Chinemerem Odionyenfe Ikwuakor; August 13, 1984 (age 42); Denver, Colorado, U.S.
- Occupations: Actor, writer, producer
- Years active: 2008–present

Eme Ikwuakor (/ˈɪkwɔːkər/ IK-waw-kər; born August 13, 1984) is a Nigerian-American actor. He is best known for his roles in Ink (2009), On My Block (2018), Inhumans (as Gorgon) (2017), and Moonfall (2022).

== Biography ==
Eme Ikwuakor was born to Patricia and Killian Ikwuakor and is one of triplets. The other triplets are a sister, Obi, and a brother, AK, who is a former All-American runner. He also has three older brothers.

Eme attended University of Colorado on a track and field scholarship. His college adviser suggested he try acting. His first major role was in the 2009 sci-fi film Ink. He continued to act while working a day job, and decided to pursue acting full-time after writing, producing and starring in a short film called Chance.

Eme began making appearances on television shows, such as Hawaii Five-0, Castle and Extant. He also appeared as himself, alongside his brother Ak, on Are You Smarter than a 5th Grader?. Eme was cast as the Marvel Comics superhero Gorgon in Inhumans.

== Filmography ==
Television roles
Year	Title	Role	Notes
2010	Outlaw	Young Cop	Episode: "In Re: Tracy Vidalin"
2011	Love Bites	Security	Episode: "Sky High"
2011	Victorious	Antoni	Episode: "A Christmas Tori"
2014	Silicon Valley	Doug	Episode: "The Cap Table"
2014	Castle	Worker	Episode: "That '70s Show"
2014	Hawaii Five-0	Super Max Guard	Episode: "O ka Pili'Ohana ka 'Oi"
2014	We Are Angels	Mathias	3 episodes
2014	Extant	Black Ops Commander	4 episodes
2014	The Comeback	Detective	Episode: "Valerie Makes a Pilot"
2016	Colony	Redhat Squad Leader	Episode: "Pilot"
2016	NCIS: Los Angeles	Patrick Badri	Episode: "Revenge Deferred"
2016	How to Get Away with Murder	Hank	Episode: "Call It Mother's Intuition"
2017	Inhumans	Gorgon	Main
2018–2021	On My Block	Dwayne Turner	Recurring
2024–present	Matlock	Elijah	Recurring

Film roles
Year	Title	Role	Notes
2008	Unlocking the Secret	Pete	Direct-to-video
2009	Ink	Gabe	
2009	Midnight Raffle	Redbone	
2010	On the Run	Andre	Short
2010	Forever No More	Ethan Ward	Short
2011	The New Republic	Downs	
2011	The Candy Nazi	Brian	Short
2011	Paracusia	James	Short
2011	The Manager: The Clumsy Cameroonian	Mohamadou	Short
2012	Remnant		Short
2012	It Gets Bigger	Eme	Short
2013	Miles Fisher: Finish What We Started		Short
2013	Murder in the Dark	Solo	
2014	Chance		Short; also produced and wrote
2014	Not Safe for Work	Accomplice / Cop	
2014	Looking for Lions	Mr. Jawara	
2015	My Favorite Five	James	
2015	Chinese New Year Hack	New Boss	Short
2015	Everything Before Us	D.E.I. Agent #2	
2015	'51 Dons	Burl	Short
2015	Concussion	Amobi Okoye	Uncredited
2016	Hold	Shane	
2022	Moonfall	Doug Davidson	
2022	The Gray Man	Barnes	
2023	Outlaw Johnny Black	Elmer	
