= Maximus (comics) =

Marvel Comics fictional character

- Maximus the Mad by Frazer Irving.

Publication information
- Publisher: Marvel Comics
- First appearance: Fantastic Four #47 (February 1966)
- Created by: Stan Lee (writer); Jack Kirby (artist)

In-story information
- Full name: Maximus Boltagon
- Species: Inhuman
- Place of origin: Attilan
- Team affiliations: Cabal
- Notable aliases: Maximus the Mad; Maximus the Magnificent
- Abilities: Inhuman physiology grants: Superhuman strength, speed, stamina, durability, agility, reflexes, and longevity; Superhuman intelligence; Proficient scientist and inventor; Advanced knowledge of physics, mechanics, and biology; Mental abilities

Maximus (also known as Maximus the Mad) is a supervillain appearing in American comic books published by Marvel Comics. The character has been depicted both as a member of and antagonist to the Inhumans. He is also the brother of Black Bolt. Created by writer Stan Lee and artist Jack Kirby, he first appeared in Fantastic Four #47 (February 1966).

Iwan Rheon portrayed Maximus in the Marvel Cinematic Universe miniseries Inhumans. Additionally, Mark Hamill, Nolan North, and Diedrich Bader have voiced the character in animation.

== Publication history ==
Maximus first appeared in Fantastic Four #47 (February 1966), and was created by Stan Lee and Jack Kirby.

== Fictional character biography ==
Maximus, an Inhuman, is the second son of two of Attilan's top geneticists: Agon, the head of the ruling Council of Geneticists, and Rynda, director of the Prenatal Care Center. Maximus was subjected to the mutagenic Terrigen Mist when he was an infant, but showed no visible mutations. As he matured, he hid his developing psionic powers from the community, but was less successful at disguising his antisocial tendencies.

When Maximus is about sixteen, his elder brother Black Bolt is released from the protective chamber in which he had been confined since birth due to the destructive nature of his powers. One of Maximus's first responses to his brother's freedom is an unsuccessful attempt to make him release his power and prove Black Bolt could not control his sonic powers, and thus lose his freedom. A month later, Black Bolt witnesses Maximus making a treacherous pact with an emissary of the Kree, the alien race responsible for genetically accelerating the Inhumans. In an attempt to stop the fleeing emissary so that he could be questioned by the ruling council, Black Bolt blasts the alien ship out of the sky. When the ship crashes to Earth, it lands on the parliament building. This kills several key members of the Genetics Council, including Black Bolt's parents. When Black Bolt assumes the throne, Maximus vows to oppose his brother and eventually usurp his rule.

Maximus stages his first successful coup a few years later. By performing an illegal experiment on the Alpha Primitives, subhuman worker clones who once served the Inhumans, Maximus creates the Trikon, three energy beings of great destructive power. While the Trikon wreaks havoc in Attilan, Maximus successfully drives the Royal Family of Inhumans out of the city. Black Bolt later returns and takes back the throne, to Maximus's dismay. Maximus also encounters the Fantastic Four for the first time. Maximus, hoping to win back the public's affection, activates the Atmo-Gun device he has been working on, which he believes will kill the human race and leave all other living beings intact. Maximus miscalculates, however, and the device has no effect. Out of spite, Maximus uses the device to erect a barrier around Attilan, imprisoning the entire race inside. Black Bolt liberates his people by destroying the barrier, at the price of devastating Attilan's ancient architecture.

Maximus succeeds in bringing about his second coup some months later. Drugging the royal family with will-deadening "hypno-potions", Maximus takes the crown from Black Bolt and has the royal family imprisoned. Before he can activate his Hypno-Gun, which he believes will make all mankind surrender to his will, the royal family escapes and subdues him. Escaping Attilan with his band of renegades in a rocket, Maximus lands in the South American country of Costa Salvador, and attempts to build a will-deadening device similar to his Hypno-Gun. His plans are opposed by the Hulk and the United States Army, however, and he and his allies are forced to flee again.

Maximus later foments a battle between the Royal Family and the Fantastic Four. Returning to Attilan, Maximus is welcomed back by his brother Black Bolt, who prefers Maximus to be somewhere he can be watched. Black Bolt detects that Maximus's psionic powers, suppressed since he was an adolescent, are returning. Offering no explanation, Black Bolt has Maximus placed in a suspended animation capsule, inside which he cannot use his powers. Gorgon objects to Black Bolt's inhumane treatment of Maximus and frees Maximus. Maximus immediately uses his mental powers to subjugate the minds of the Inhuman populace and give Black Bolt amnesia. Maximus then restores the barrier around Attilan and begins negotiations with the Kree to supply them with Inhuman soldiers. Eventually, Black Bolt's memory returns, and alongside the Avengers, he returns to Attilan and destroys the barrier.

With his mental powers submerged, Maximus escapes strict punishment for his treachery by feigning insanity. He then begins work on his next project to usurp the throne, the construction of the android Omega, whose power source is supposedly the collective guilt evinced by the Inhuman populace over their treatment of the Alpha Primitives. The Fantastic Four helps the Royal Family thwart the construct, and the damage it causes was slight. Maximus stages his fourth successful coup a short time later after the Royal Family briefly leaves Attilan on business. Taking Crystal and her husband Quicksilver captive, Maximus forces Black Bolt to give him the crown to spare their lives. Black Bolt does so, and allows himself to be placed in captivity. Maximus reestablishes contact with the Kree and negotiates a deal where the Kree would take all of the Inhumans with extraordinary abilities, leaving him the other half of the population to rule. Triton and Karnak rescue most of Maximus's captives and outwit the Kree agent Shatterstar. Unaware of that victory, Black Bolt lets loose in agony, once again leveling the city. Angered by what had happened, Black Bolt strikes Maximus for the first time and has him imprisoned.

Maximus then allies himself with the Enclave, a band of human scientists who capture Medusa. The Enclave wants to conquer Attilan and dispatches an aerial strike force. When the Enclave threatens to execute Medusa, however, Maximus turns on them out of unrequited passion for his brother's betrothed. A weapon Maximus is manning overloads, leaving Maximus in a deathlike coma. Black Bolt has his brother's body placed in a special crypt, and when Attilan is transported from the Earth to the Moon, Maximus accompanies it. On the moon, Maximus's mind makes contact with an alien power crystal located there, reactivating his dormant mental powers. When Black Bolt next comes to pay his respects to his brother, Maximus uses his powers to swap bodies with Black Bolt. For several months, Maximus rules Attilan in Black Bolt's body, while Black Bolt in Maximus's body is imprisoned. Reestablishing contact with the Enclave, Maximus helps them implement meteoroid launchers with which they intend to bombard Earth. With the aid of the Avengers, Maximus's switch is discovered, and the Enclave's schemes are foiled. Maximus is forced to return to his own body and is placed in solitary confinement.

During the 2007 miniseries Silent War, Maximus again plots revenge, taunting Black Bolt from his prison and trying to sway a distressed Medusa on his side. He manages to convince Medusa to try to have Luna help "cure" him, only for Luna to realize too late that the "cure" instead allows Maximus to gain control over all the other Inhumans. After the enhanced Marines managed to destroy Attilan, Maximus usurps the throne of the Inhumans from Black Bolt, takes Medusa as his queen, and announces a new plan to conquer Earth.

In the 2009 "War of Kings" storyline, Black Bolt retakes the throne of the Inhumans. Maximus is still free and serves as Black Bolt's science advisor, devising war machines for the Kree to use against the Shi'ar.

In the "Death of the Inhumans" storyline, Maximus is brainwashed into serving the Kree as the alleged Super-Inhuman Vox. He is later killed when his Vox costume malfunctions and teleports him away.

In Imperial (2025), Maximus is revealed to be alive and working with the Grandmaster. When Grandmaster meets with Maximus on the planet Kal Lak'Thunn, they discuss a recent incident where Skrull forces allied with Grandmaster poisoned several galactic royals. Maximus informs him of another key player as Black Bolt arrives with Lockjaw. After Black Bolt defeats Grandmaster, he leaves with Maximus and Lockjaw to restore the Inhuman empire.

== Powers and abilities ==
As an Inhuman, Maximus possesses superhuman physical abilities and an extended lifespan, as well as psychic abilities that enable him to manipulate and control the minds of others. He is highly intelligent and is a skilled inventor, with advanced knowledge of physics, mechanics, and biology.

== Other versions ==
=== Age of Apocalypse ===
An alternate universe version of Maximus from Earth-295 appears in Age of Apocalypse. This version is a servant of Apocalypse and serves as his Horseman of Death before being killed by Sunfire.

=== Marvel Knights 2099 ===
An alternate universe version of Maximus from Earth-2992 appears in the one-shot Inhumans 2099. After he kills the Inhuman royal family, Black Bolt is forced to kill him.

=== Ultimate Marvel ===
An alternate universe version of Maximus from Earth-1610 appears in the Ultimate Marvel imprint. This version is the fiancé of Crystal, though she refuses to marry him due to his insanity.

== In other media ==
Character poster of Iwan Rheon as Maximus for the television series, Inhumans.

=== Television ===
- Maximus appears in Fantastic Four (1994), voiced by Mark Hamill.
- Maximus appears in the Inhumans motion comic, voiced by Brian Drummond.
- Maximus appears in the Hulk and the Agents of S.M.A.S.H. episode "Inhuman Nature", voiced by Nolan North.
- Maximus appears in the Ultimate Spider-Man episode "Inhumanity", voiced again by Nolan North.
- Maximus appears in Guardians of the Galaxy, voiced by Diedrich Bader.
- Maximus appears in the Avengers Assemble episode "Civil War, Part 1: The Fall of Attilan", voiced again by Diedrich Bader.
- Maximus appears in Inhumans, portrayed primarily by Iwan Rheon and by Aidan Fiske as a child. This version lacks powers, causing him to be envious towards Black Bolt, especially since their father, Agon, has denied him his desire to rule. After seizing control of Attilan, the Inhuman royal family flees to Earth. Black Bolt later returns to Attilan and traps Maximus in a bunker there, leaving him Attilan's only resident.
- Maximus appears in Marvel Future Avengers, voiced by Hiroki Takahashi in Japanese and Michael Sinterniklaas in English.

=== Video games ===
- Maximus appears in Marvel: Avengers Alliance.
- Maximus appears as a boss and playable character in Lego Marvel Super Heroes 2.
- Maximus appears as a playable character in Marvel: Future Fight.
- Maximus appears in Marvel Avengers Academy.
- Maximus appears as a boss in Marvel Ultimate Alliance 3: The Black Order, voiced again by Diedrich Bader.
