= Karnak (character) =

Marvel Comics fictional character

- Karnak fighting a Skrull in Secret Invasion: Inhumans #2

Publication information
- Publisher: Marvel Comics
- First appearance: Fantastic Four #45 (December 1965)
- Created by: Stan Lee (writer); Jack Kirby (artist)

In-story information
- Full name: Karnak Mander-Azur
- Species: Inhumans
- Place of origin: Attilan
- Team affiliations: Inhuman Royal Family; Secret Warriors
- Notable aliases: The Shatterer
- Abilities: Inhuman physiology: Superhuman strength, speed, stamina, durability, agility, and reflexes; Master martial artist and hand-to-hand combatant; Ability to sense weak points

Karnak (/ˈkɑːrnæk/) is a superhero appearing in American comic books published by Marvel Comics. He was created by Stan Lee and Jack Kirby and debuted in Fantastic Four (vol. 1) #45 (1965) along with other members of the Inhuman Royal Family.

The character Karnak Mander-Azur was never exposed to the Terrigen Mists, so he never developed additional powers like other Inhumans, but he is a martial artist who can find the weakness in anything and then use his training and strength to exploit it. Although the Jack Kirby Collector described him as "a philosophical karate expert with nominal personality" in 2004, subsequent writers have made use of his skill for puzzle-solving and strategic-planning in Inhumans' stories, leading to him being given his first solo series in 2015, titled Karnak: The Flaw in All Things and written by Warren Ellis.

Karnak made his live-action debut in the 2017 Marvel Cinematic Universe (MCU) television series Inhumans, portrayed by Ken Leung.

== Publication history ==
Karnak first appeared in Fantastic Four #45, and was created by Stan Lee and Jack Kirby, as part of their run on the title that helped lay the foundations for the Marvel Universe.

As a core member of the Inhumans, he has appeared in the group's own series over the years, including the 1998 Inhumans twelve-issue limited series by Paul Jenkins and Jae Lee, the Silent War mini-series by David Hine and Frazer Irving in 2007, and Secret Invasion: Inhumans in the following year.

Karnak is the narrator of Inhumanity #1 (February 2014) because his abilities gave writer Matt Fraction a way to frame the story:

I needed somebody who could put puzzles together. He sees the flaws in things. I needed the rest of the cast to put together what the hell Black Bolt and Maximus were up to. It's a way for everyone to puzzle it out with Karnak as he's putting it together. It's a way we can get into the story that's informative but sort of backwards.

Although he commits suicide at the end of that issue, he appears in the cliffhanger of Inhuman #13 (May 2015) saying he had found a weakness in the afterlife. This allowed writer Charles Soule to bring the character back, and he explained Karnak's importance:

Karnak is just such a unique, weird (in a good way) character. His power is the ability to see weakness and stress points in anything around him, which he then exploits either physically through his amazing kung fu-esque fighting skills, or mentally/strategically in his role as one of Queen Medusa's chief counselors. He tends to have a fascinating perspective on events, and adding his voice back into the mix of the "Inhuman" cast will open up some great new possibilities.

Karnak will get his first eponymous series as part of the All-New, All-Different Marvel line emerging from 2015's "Secret Wars" storyline and the first issue of his series will feature a monster variant cover of Rommbu from Tales to Astonish #19 drawn by Eric Powell. Karnak is part of a wider push the Inhumans are getting across Marvel's media output - on television (in Agents of S.H.I.E.L.D.), in film (with the upcoming Inhumans) and in print (with the A-N, A-DM relaunch including the team books All-New Inhumans and Uncanny Inhumans, alongside the other solo titles Ms. Marvel vol. 4 and Moon Girl and Devil Dinosaur). Editor-in-Chief Axel Alonso has said that the specific series came about because "Nick Lowe was looking to build the Inhumans line with a solo book or two and suggested Karnak as a character to spotlight. I didn't need to be sold on Karnak, who's far and away my favorite Inhuman". They picked Warren Ellis to write the title because of his earlier stints at Marvel reworking their characters. Ellis, who is joined by Gerardo Zaffino on art duties, described what drew him to the character:

he's not an Inhuman. He never took the mutagenic Terrigen mists like the other Inhumans. He's a dementedly intense philosopher who can see the flaw in anything—objects, systems, ideas, people—and strike that flaw in order to destroy it.

...

His parents refused to allow him to become an Inhuman, and instead he studied at the Tower of Wisdom until his natural powers of perception became so phenomenally strong that he could annihilate anything by touching it. He is the Inhuman who made himself inhuman by sheer force of will. He extends the work of the Tower of Wisdom by both teaching and extending aid to people damaged (as he sees it) by the Terrigen mists that cause Inhumanity. It was all right there. In this new Marvel Universe situation, where all kinds of people have been mutated by Terrigen, there's an endless number of plot launches there.

With regard to the inspiration behind Karnak's new form, Ellis states:

I am still writing KARNAK, and am therefore immersed in the viewpoint of various strains of speculative realism, tending towards the nihilistic frames of Peter Sjostedt-H and Eugene Thacker...

== Fictional character biography ==
Karnak is a member of the Inhuman race, one of those who form the Inhuman Royal Family, born on the island of Attilan. Cousin of Black Bolt, king of the Inhumans, Karnak has the ability to find the weak point in any person, plan, or object. Thus, he is usually used as planner by the Inhumans. He also serves as a priest and philosopher to the Inhumans.

He is the brother of Triton, who endured Terrigenesis before he did. However, Triton's Terrigenesis was so extreme that his parents, Mander and Azur, begged that Karnak not have to endure the procedure. Instead, he was sent to a monastery, where he learned martial arts.

He is usually attended by his relatives, Gorgon and Triton. He has taken part in most of the Inhumans' adventures, such as the Kree-Skrull War, and the many moves of the Inhuman city of Attilan.

Karnak and the Royal Family encounter Maximus' creation, the Trikon, and are driven from Attilan's Great Refuge in exile.

Karnak first appeared as a member of the Inhumans when he attempted to retrieve his cousin and queen, Medusa from the outside world and take her back to Attilan. This led him into conflict with the Fantastic Four, the first humans he met, who were harboring Medusa after rescuing her from the villainous Frightful Four. Accordingly, Karnak is indirectly responsible for revealing Attilan's existence to the outside world. Karnak battled Maximus alongside the Inhuman Royal Family, and became trapped in Maximus' "negative zone" barrier around the Great Refuge. He was freed from the "negative zone" barrier along with the rest of the Inhumans by the Fantastic Four and left the Great Refuge with the Royal Family to visit the outside world. He teamed with the Thing, Human Torch, and Black Panther against the Psycho-Man. He aided the Inhuman Royal Family in defeating Maximus' next attempt to overthrow the Great Refuge.

Karnak left Earth with the Inhuman Royal Family to prevent the Kree subjugation of the Inhumans, and battled various aliens. He continued to battle Kree agents, and then returned to Earth. Karnak later accompanied the Inhuman exodus when Attilan was relocated to the Blue Area of Earth's Moon.

He was later sent to Earth with Gorgon in an attempt to find Black Bolt's missing son with Daredevil's help. There he and his companions fought against Ultron-13 in which Karnak's power allowed him to discover the weak spot in Ultron's neck. Later they became entangled in Mephisto's plot against Daredevil, and were transported to a netherworld where they were personally attacked by Blackheart. Karnak's animosity towards Gorgon was fanned into a rage, causing actual physical violence. Blackheart was soon defeated and the group went their intended ways.

During the Secret Invasion, Karnak encounters a Skrull in the form of Toros. Karnak engages it and learns that it can copy his powers. Karnak manages to defeat the Toros-Skrull by sending it out the window, where it is impaled on a fence.

Following Attilan's destruction during the Infinity storyline, Karnak goes on a rampage in New York at the start of the Inhumanity storyline. He is stopped and imprisoned by the Avengers. After warning Medusa to forget what she knows to prepare for a coming cataclysm, Karnak commits suicide by leaping out of one of the windows in Avengers Tower. Months pass by and the Terrigen Mists that spread throughout the world during Inhumanity have revealed Inhuman hybrids living among humans, dubbed the NuHumans. Medusa reveals their existence to the general public, and NuHumans become integrated into New Attilan society. One NuHuman named Lineage joins Medusa's council, taking Karnak's place. Lineage's power is having the knowledge of all his ancestors. Lineage plans to use the Inhuman genome to destroy humanity and rule the Inhumans. Meanwhile, Karnak has wound up in a strange afterlife that he believes to be hell. He and an ally he meets here plans to escape this place, and they successfully find a door out while holding off strange creatures. Karnak uses his ability to see the weakness in things to open the door, and finds himself bursting out of Lineage's chest in the real world, killing Lineage in the process. He realizes that what he thought was Hell was inside Lineage, as Karnak is one of his ancestors. Karnak tells Medusa he knows that she has been an outstanding queen in his absence and rejoins her council.

During the Civil War II storyline, Karnak is at New Attilan when Iron Man infiltrates it to claim Ulysses Cain. Alongside Medusa and Crystal, Karnak is defeated by Iron Man, who makes off with Ulysses. Karnak joins Medusa, Crystal, and the Inhumans with them for a trip to Stark Tower. He nearly levels the tower with his powers until the Avengers, the Ultimates, and S.H.I.E.L.D. arrive. Karnak is present when Ulysses projects his latest vision of the Hulk standing over the corpses of the superheroes.

During the Inhumans vs. X-Men storyline, Karnak is attacked by a time-displaced Jean Grey who telepathically traps him.

During the Secret Empire storyline, Karnak joins up with Daisy Johnson's Secret Warriors. While driving west, the Warriors encounter the Howling Commandos after falling into a trap. After escaping, the team is found by the X-Men.

== Powers and abilities ==
Karnak has enhanced strength, stamina, durability, agility, and reflexes as a result of his genetically superior Inhuman physiology. Unlike most other Inhumans, he does not have superhuman powers because he was never exposed to the mutagenic Terrigen Mist. Instead, Karnak has the extrasensory ability (achieved through meditation and intensive training) to perceive stress points, fracture planes, or weaknesses in objects or living beings. He has complete voluntary control of most of his autonomic bodily functions. All striking surfaces of his body are extremely toughened. He is capable of shattering substances including mild steel and rendering superhuman opponents unconscious by striking them.

Like all Inhumans, Karnak's immune system is weaker than that of an average human.

Karnak has received his fighting skills as a result of Inhuman royal militia training. He also graduated from a monastery, at the Tower of Wisdom in Attilan, where he learned both philosophy and martial arts.

He uses a hover-platform for transportation designed by Inhuman technicians.

== Other versions ==
=== Amalgam Comics ===
Triserinak, a composite character based on Karnak, Triton, and DC Comics character Serifan, appears in the Amalgam Comics universe.

=== Earth X ===
In the alternate future of "Earth X", Karnak has undergone a further mutation. His cranium has greatly increased and his features are now more sunken. In the sequel Paradise X, Karnak exiles himself from his own people, seeing the marriage of Medusa and the King of Brittan as a betrayal of Black Bolt's memory and the superiority of the Inhumans.

=== Ultimate Marvel ===
In the Ultimate Marvel universe, Karnak is able to sense and manipulate energy.

== Collected editions ==
Title	Material collected	Publication date	ISBN
Karnak: The Flaw in All Things	Karnak #1-6	January 2017	0785198482

== In other media ==
=== Television ===
Character poster of Ken Leung as Karnak for the television series, Inhumans.

- Karnak appears in The New Fantastic Four episode "Medusa and the Inhumans", voiced by John Stephenson.
- Karnak appears in Fantastic Four, voiced by Clyde Kusatsu.
- Karnak appears in the Hulk and the Agents of S.M.A.S.H. episode "Inhuman Nature", voiced by Fred Tatasciore.
- Karnak appears in Ultimate Spider-Man, voiced again by Fred Tatasciore.
- Karnak appears in the Inhumans motion comic, voiced by Alex Zahara.
- Karnak appears in Guardians of the Galaxy, voiced by Oliver Vaquer.
- Karnak appears in Avengers Assemble, voiced again by Oliver Vaquer.
- Karnak appears in Inhumans (2017), portrayed by Ken Leung. This version has the ability to predict the outcomes of every situation.
- Karnak appears in Marvel Future Avengers, voiced by Hiroyuki Kinoshita in Japanese and Grant George in English.

=== Video games ===
- Karnak appears as a non-playable character in Marvel: Ultimate Alliance, voiced by Michael Gough.
- Karnak appears as a playable character in Marvel Contest of Champions.
- Karnak appears as a playable character in Marvel: Future Fight.
- Karnak appears as a playable character in Marvel Puzzle Quest.

=== Merchandise ===
- Karnak appears as one of the 12 unique Heroclix figures included in the Marvel Supernova set.
