= Jean Higgins =

American television and film producer

Jean Higgins is an American television and film producer. She has worked on the series Lost and CSI: Miami. She won an Emmy Award for outstanding drama series at the September 2005 ceremony for her work on the first season of Lost. She also won a Producers Guild of America Award for television producer of the year in episodic for the first season.

== Career ==
She began her career as a producer working in feature films as a line producer and associate producer. Her first film was Movers & Shakers in 1985. She was a producer for the 1999 film Arlington Road.

She became a line producer for the first season of CSI: Miami in 2002. She left the series at the end of the first season in 2003.

She joined the crew of Lost as a co-producer on the pilot episode in 2004. She returned as a co-producer for the first season and was promoted to line producer mid-way through the season. Higgins and the producers won an Emmy Award for outstanding drama series at the September 2005 ceremony and a Producers Guild of America (PGA) Award for television producer of the year in episodic for their work on the first season. She returned as a line producer for the second season in 2005. Higgins and the producers were nominated for the PGA award for television producer of the year for the second season but did not win. She was promoted to co-executive producer for the third season. She remained a co-executive producer for the fourth season. The producers were nominated for both the Emmy Award for outstanding drama series at the September 2008 ceremony and the PGA award for television producer of the year for their work on the fourth season. Higgins remained a co-executive producer for the fifth season and was again nominated for the Emmy Award for outstanding drama series at the September 2009 ceremony and the PGA award for television producer of the year. She was promoted to executive producer for the series sixth and final season. In 2012 she was Producer for Last Resort.
