= Gorgon (Inhuman) =

Fictional character; leader of Attilan's Royal Guard and guardian of the Inhumans

Publication information
- Publisher: Marvel Comics
- First appearance: Fantastic Four #44 (November 1965)
- Created by: Stan Lee (writer); Jack Kirby (artist)

In-story information
- Alter ego: Gorgon Petragon
- Species: Inhuman
- Place of origin: Attilan
- Team affiliations: Inhuman Royal Family; Fantastic Four
- Abilities: Enhanced strength and durability; Ability to generate seismic shockwaves via bull-like legs and hooves

Gorgon is a character appearing in American comic books published by Marvel Comics. Gorgon is also a member of the Royal Family of the Inhumans, a race of superpowered beings from the hidden city of Attilan.

Eme Ikwuakor portrays Gorgon in the 2017 Marvel Cinematic Universe (MCU) television series Inhumans.

== Publication history ==
Gorgon debuted in Fantastic Four #44 (November 1965), and was created by Stan Lee and Jack Kirby.

== Fictional character biography ==
The son of archivist Milena and architect Korath (brother of the previous king Agon), Gorgon Petragon is a cousin of king Black Bolt and a member of the Royal Family of the Inhumans. As is custom among the Inhumans, Gorgon was exposed to the Terrigen Mists as a teenager, gaining increased strength, while his feet were transformed into hooves capable of generating destructive seismic waves. As an adult, Gorgon becomes Black Bolt's bodyguard and a mentor to the other Inhumans.

Gorgon first leaves the Inhuman city of Attilan to rescue Medusa (suffering from amnesia at the time), who became lost in the outside world. This leads to a battle with the Fantastic Four, who rescued Medusa from the supervillain team the Frightful Four. After making contact with the outside world, Gorgon and the rest of the Royal Family have several encounters with the Fantastic Four over the years, seeking their aid against foes such as Black Bolt's brother Maximus, Psycho-Man, and the Sphinx.

With several other Inhumans, Gorgon also battles the master villain Mandarin, helps free Maximus, journeys to America to search for the missing Black Bolt, and battles Magneto. Over the years, and with continued exposure to the outside world, Gorgon has many adventures, usually taking place in the company of fellow members of the Royal Family.

Significant moments for Gorgon include defying the Attilan Genetics Council and helping to hide the pregnant Medusa (with Black Bolt's child) on Earth; and arguing with Black Bolt over the use of Alpha Primitives as slaves. He leads an Inhuman force down to Earth to gain the return of the Terrigen Mists. This goes badly as many human captives are slain by an impatient Inhuman named Jolen. This sparks a war between Earth and the Inhumans, and Gorgon is captured. He is subjected to the Terrigen Mists again. This amplifies Gorgon's powers and change him into a true beast with a lion-like head, claws, and uncontrollable rages. As with the other Inhumans, he leaves the Moon to assist them in taking over the Kree empire. He is later seen with his more humanoid appearance.

In the Inhuman storyline, Gorgon is shot in the spine and rendered paraplegic. In All-New, All-Different Marvel, he is cured by the Inhuman Panacea.

== Powers and abilities ==
Gorgon's superhuman powers are a result of exposure to the mutagenic Terrigen Mist. Gorgon has bull-like legs and hooves and can create intense shockwaves equivalent to a powerful earthquake. He also possesses enhanced strength and durability, although like all Inhumans he has a weaker immune system than that of an average human.

== Other versions ==
- Big Gorgon, a fusion of Gorgon and DC Comics character Big Bear from Earth-9602, appears in the Amalgam Comics one-shot Challengers of the Fantastic.
- An alternate universe variant of Gorgon from Earth-9997 appears in Earth X.
- An alternate universe variant of Gorgon from Earth-2149 appears in Marvel Zombies.
- An alternate universe variant of Gorgon from Earth-1610 appears in the Ultimate Marvel universe. This version is female and possesses additional hypnotic abilities.

== In other media ==
Character poster of Eme Ikwuakor as Gorgon for the television series Inhumans

=== Television ===
- Gorgon appears in The New Fantastic Four episode "Medusa and the Inhumans".
- Gorgon appears in Fantastic Four, voiced by Michael Dorn.
- Gorgon appears in the Inhumans motion comic, voiced by Brian Drummond.
- Gorgon appears in the Hulk and the Agents of S.M.A.S.H. episode "Inhuman Nature", voiced by Nolan North.
- Gorgon appears in the Ultimate Spider-Man episode "Inhumanity", voiced again by Nolan North.
- Gorgon appears in Guardians of the Galaxy, voiced again by Nolan North.
- Gorgon appears in the Avengers Assemble episode "Inhumans Among Us", voiced again by Nolan North.
- Gorgon appears in Inhumans (2017), portrayed by Eme Ikwuakor.
- Gorgon appears in Marvel Future Avengers, voiced by Hiroshi Shirokuma in Japanese and Aaron LaPlante in English.

=== Video games ===
- Gorgon appears in Marvel: Ultimate Alliance, voiced by Greg Eagles.
- Gorgon appears as a playable character in Marvel: Avengers Alliance.
- Gorgon appears as a playable character in Marvel: Future Fight.
- Gorgon appears as a playable character in Marvel Avengers Academy.
- Gorgon appears as a playable character in Lego Marvel Super Heroes 2.
- Gorgon appears as a non-playable character in Marvel Ultimate Alliance 3: The Black Order, voiced by Crispin Freeman.
