= ResurrXion =

2017 relaunch of various comic book series

"ResurrXion" thematic stories
- The logo used for the "ResurrXion" storyline

Publication information
- Publisher: Marvel Comics
- Publication date: March 2017
- Main character(s): Inhumans; X-Men

"ResurrXion" was a 2017 relaunch by the American publisher Marvel Comics of various comic book series related to the Inhumans and the X-Men franchises. This was intended to establish a new status quo for both franchises after the events in the 2016 "Inhumans vs X-Men" storyline, which concluded a number of then-ongoing storylines that followed the 2015 "Secret Wars" storyline.

One notable effect of the relaunch is that it reaffirmed the importance of the X-Men characters and franchise, which some critics felt had grown isolated and diminished in prestige in light of the success of the Avengers-centered films of the Marvel Cinematic Universe, a status that some felt was attributed to 20th Century Fox's then-ownership of the feature film rights for the X-Men, before Disney bought the studio in March 2019.

== Publication history ==
"ResurrXion" was initially announced in September 2016 before the storylines "Death of X" and "Inhumans vs X-Men" began and it was stated that it would take place canonically after the "Inhumans vs X-Men" comes to a close. From that time on until March when "ResurrXion" was launched many teasers for each related series were released in the following months. To make room for the "ResurrXion" lineup of comics, some of the then-current Inhumans and X-Men titles were cancelled, including Extraordinary X-Men, All-New X-Men, Uncanny X-Men, Uncanny Inhumans, and Mosaic. In March a few weeks before the "ResurrXion" lineup was launched some of the writers at Marvel teased what to expect from some of the characters involved in the upcoming event. The event was officially launched on March 29, 2017 with Inhumans Prime and X-Men Prime.

== Prime synopses ==
To set up the main new ongoing titles, Marvel launched two one-shot books, X-Men Prime and Inhumans Prime. Each book was used to set up how each team was going to move forward after the events of "Inhumans vs X-Men", as well as setting up the story arcs for other tie-in books.

=== Inhumans Prime ===
The Inhuman Royal Family tracks Maximus to the Grand Canyon to bring him and his followers home. Maximus tries to use his powers to instigate a fight amongst Medusa's followers, but Swain uses her powers to cancel out his, leading to his capture in New Attilan. While imprisoned he taunts Black Bolt with a mysterious dark secret of their past. Meanwhile, due to the events of their war against the X-Men culminating with Medusa deciding to destroy the remaining Terrigen Mist in favor of the X-Men, she addresses the people of New Attilan and abdicates the throne; Iso becomes the new ruler of New Attilan in Medusa's stead. Medusa's final command as queen is to sentence Maximus to eternal solitude in space. Iso makes her first official speech as ruler and announces that even though the Terrigen is gone and thus the source of their powers, they will continue to thrive as a people working closely alongside the rest of the world. As the now-former Royal Family begins to plan their next move given their new status quo of living without their birthright of Terrigen, Marvel Boy appears with a mysterious proposition for them.

=== X-Men Prime ===
Kitty Pryde returns to earth and tries to establish a normal life for herself outside of superheroics until Storm finds her and informs her of everything that has transpired on earth between while Kitty was in space. Storm then announces to Kitty that she has contemplated resigning as leader of the X-Men due to leading them to war against the Inhumans when the situation could have been handled diplomatically instead. Storm takes Kitty to X-Haven so she can see first-hand how drastically things have changed for the X-Men in Kitty's absence. Meanwhile, Lady Deathstrike is trying to lie low and is travelling with a group of refugees until their mode of transportation is attacked. Deathstrike survives but ends up blocked by a mysterious woman who seems to be oddly interested in her. Deathstrike stabs her with her claws but shortly after that a missile barrage ambushes her, rendering her unconscious. The woman survived the stabbing and reports back to her employers that she has successfully captured Deathstrike. While touring X-Haven Kitty realizes that the time-displaced X-Men have all left and are looking for their own place in the world after learning that they are not from the Earth-616 timeline. Kitty holds a meeting with all of the X-Men and agrees to lead them as long as Storm remains on the team. She then has Magik teleport X-Haven from Limbo to Central Park. Meanwhile, the mysterious organization that kidnapped Deathstrike expresses a mysterious interest to also capture Logan, Sabretooth, Warpath, and Domino.

== Notable changes ==
Many important changes took place in both Inhumans and X-Men titles that have had a significant impact on the direction and tone of each series for the long-run.

=== Impact on Inhumans titles ===
The now-former Royal Family joins Marvel Boy on a potential suicide-mission to space in order to learn about an ancient Kree secret regarding the Inhumans that Marvel Boy claims to know about. Medusa's hair begins to fall out, signalling that she is dying due to the Terrigen within her system reacting negatively against her own biological systems. Maximus ended up secretly switching places with Black Bolt via image-inducer, meaning Black Bolt was really the one sentenced to eternal solitude in space instead of Maximus. Black Bolt ends up in an unknown part of space where his powers are somehow nullified and he is trapped in a mysterious prison. When Hydra takes over S.H.I.E.L.D. and effectively the world, Quake assembles a new team of Secret Warriors to help her defeat Hydra. Karnak becomes resigned to his fate on earth and becomes more passive than in the past.

=== Impact on X-Men titles ===
Storm steps down as leader due to feeling guilty for her actions when the X-Men decided to declare war against the Inhumans but remains on the team after Kitty Pryde agrees to lead in her place, leading into Kitty's struggles with leading the team despite many attempts from humans on the outside to discredit the X-Men. The mansion is teleported from Limbo to Central Park, New York, where the X-Men rededicate themselves to heroics instead of fearing for their own survival. Young Beast continues to dabble deeper and deeper with magic and in doing so begins alienating himself from his team. Jimmy Hudson from the Ultimate Universe somehow ends up on Earth-616 as an amnesiac. Jean begins to sense that the Phoenix Force is returning for her. Weapon X resurfaces and begins tracking specific mutants for a mysterious unknown project after kidnapping and experimenting on Lady Deathstrike.

== Titles involved ==
=== Inhumans titles ===
- Black Bolt, #1–12
- Inhumans Prime #1
- Royals, #1–12
- Secret Warriors, vol. 2 #1–12
- Lockjaw, #1–4

=== X-Men titles ===
- All-New Wolverine, #19–35
- Astonishing X-Men, vol. 4 #1–17
- Cable, vol. 3 #1–5, #150–159
- Generation X, vol. 2 #1–9
- Iceman, vol. 3 #1–11
- Jean Grey, #1–11
- Old Man Logan, vol. 2 #25–50
- Weapon X, vol. 3 #1–27
- X-Men Blue, #1–36
- X-Men Gold, #1–36
- X-Men Red #1–11
- X-Men Prime #1
