= Extraordinary X-Men =

Comic book series

- Cover of Extraordinary X-Men #1 (January 2016); Art by Humberto Ramos

Group publication information
- Publisher: Marvel Comics
- Created by: Jeff Lemire; Humberto Ramos

In-story information
- Member(s): Cerebra; Colossus; Forge; Iceman; Jean Grey (Past); Magik; Nightcrawler; Old Man Logan; Storm

Extraordinary X-Men

Series publication information
- Format: Ongoing series
- Genre: Superhero
- Publication date: January 2016 – May 2017
- Number of issues: 20

Creative team
- Writer(s): Jeff Lemire
- Penciller(s): List: Humberto Ramos Victor Ibañez
- Inker(s): Victor Olazaba
- Letterer(s): Joe Caramagna
- Colorist(s): List: Edgar Delgado Jay Ramos
- Creator(s): Jeff Lemire; Humberto Ramos
- Editor(s): List: Christina Harrington (assistant) Daniel Ketchum (editor) Mark Paniccia (X-Men group editor) Axel Alonzo (editor in chief)

Extraordinary X-Men is a comic series from Marvel Comics and the flagship X-Men title under the All-New, All-Different Marvel re-branding. The story takes place following the conclusion of the Secret Wars crossover event. In this comic series, mutants are again faced with possible extinction due to Terrigen Mist which causes exposed mutants to become sterile and possibly suffer from a fatal degenerative disease called "M-Pox". The gas also prevents the activation of the X-Gene. The series ended with #20.

== Publication history ==
To reboot the X-Men series, Jeff Lemire was hired to write Extraordinary X-Men, with Humberto Ramos as penciller and Victor Olazaba as inker. The new series launched October 2015 and, on its release, was the fifth-highest-selling comic book with over 133,000 copies sold. The book, along with All-New X-Men, was cancelled following the Inhumans vs. X-Men event and, as a part of Marvel's ResurrXion rebranding, the story of the X-Men continued in X-Men Gold, X-Men Blue, X-Men Red and Astonishing X-Men.

== Plot summary ==
=== X-Haven ===
After the release of the Terrigen Mist, Storm, Iceman and Magik have decided to leave the Westchester and establish X-Haven in the Limbo dimension. Their goal is to protect healthy mutants from the Terrigen Mist and to provide safe care for mutants who were infected by it. Before leaving they try to recruit old friends: Colossus, living quietly in Russia; Nightcrawler, recently abducted; and Jean Grey, who is attending college. Jean initially refuses to join, but reveals that she has sensed Wolverine, who should be dead. Storm is successful in only recruiting Colossus, but as he and Magik go to investigate Nightcrawler's disappearance, they are abducted by the Marauders. Mister Sinister is experimenting on blending Inhuman DNA with Mutant DNA. He hopes that Magik's sorcery will be the key, since all previous experiments failed. When he knocks out Magik, the defenses for X-Haven fall apart and demons start attacking the school. Storm, Iceman, Anole, Glob Herman, Ernst, and Cerebra (who is implanted into a Sentinel) try to defend, while Forge creates a failsafe shield. Back in NYC, Jean Grey is disgusted when she sees humans attacking an Inhuman, thinking he is a mutant. She uses her powers and her current boyfriend Chris is horrified that he is dating a mutant. She then meets with Old Man Logan and convinces him that since he is from a different timeline he won't kill the X-Men in this dimension and she will do whatever she can to protect him from himself. They are then teleported to X-Haven and help with the final defenses before Forge powers up a shield. With X-Haven safe, they travel to Nightcrawler's last location and Wolverine tracks them into the sewers where they confront Sinister and the Marauders. He reveals that he is only trying to save the mutant race, but they are doomed for extinction. His only experiment to blend the Inhuman and mutants was a clone of Cyclops, who then rampages through New York City. After the battle, Storm announces that the X-Men are opening X-Haven to any mutant seeking sanctuary from the Terrigen Mist, and mean no harm to humans or Inhumans and will also be there to help them if needed. The speech goes viral and mutants respond from around the world.

=== Apocalypse Wars ===
After a successful mission in the Savage Land to rescue Sunfire, Storm gives Colossus permission to train a team of students for battles. Anole, No-Girl, Glob Herman, and Ernst begin training. Storm does not trust Sunfire, claiming that "he and Cyclops" caused the Terrigen Mist. They then rescue Nightcrawler, who is hunted by a mob in Germany. Storm and Jean delve into his mind to rid him of his mental instability, but find out he discovered a mutant genocide which unhinged him. Cerebro then discovers 600 mutant signatures, called the Ark, in Tokyo and agrees to send Colossus and the team to investigate. Sugar Man was experimenting with mutant genomes and starts a self-destruct, but Colossus and his team teleport with it into the future. Storm and the Extraordinary X-Men quickly follow, but the one minute delay turns into 12 months difference in the future time line, called Omega World.

Glob, No-Girl, Ernst, and Anole have been on the run from the new Horseman of Apocalypse: Colossus, Deadpool, Moon Knight, and Venom. The team loses the mutant genomes, but then tracks the horseman to Apocalypse's temple. Wolverine gets absorbed by Venom and the rest of the team deal with the Horseman, so Storm and Nightcrawler teleport into the temple to find the genomes. They find Apocalypse, now a millennium old, using every last vestige of his energy in keeping Beyond World from collapsing. He has been attempting to create his vision of a perfect world. He believes mutant-kind is doomed, so he destroyed the Ark. Nightcrawler is furious and stabs him, then Omega World begins to collapse. Magik finally rejoins them but – after finding that her protege, Sapna, is fated to destroy the X-Men – subdues Colossus and returns them home. Storm also brings the elderly Apocalypse since Colossus is still in Horseman form. Back in the present, Magik also finds that Sapna has abandoned X-Haven and Apocalypse is forced to revert Colossus, but instead uses the last of his power to teleport Colossus to Clan Akkaba.

=== Kingdoms Fall ===
Magik follows the spectral trail that Sapna left behind in hopes of finding her and bringing her back to X-Haven. The trail leads her to one of the many portals that Sapna previously discovered after her powers activated. Meanwhile, Nightcrawler and Iceman track down members of Clan Akkaba in hopes of finding Colossus to revert him back to normal from Horseman form. While interrogating one of the clansmen, Nightcrawler snaps and almost kills him. Storm meets Magik at the portal and they pass through many unknown barren realms connected to the portal while following Sapna's trail. They end up in a war-torn realm, ambushed by a team of mystics who assume that Magik and Storm are servants of a being known as the World Eater. Nightcrawler and Iceman teleport to a Clan Akkaba hideout in Egypt to continue their hunt for Colossus and discover a mural depicting everything that's happened to the X-Men and may happen in the future, with a large image of Apocalypse in the center of it all. There Colossus ambushes them, ready to kill his friends, claiming he has no choice. Storm conjures a massive cyclone to carry away their attackers so she and Magik can continue through the portal to find Sapna. Meanwhile, at X-Haven, Apocalypse begins to bait and taunt Forge. As Colossus is just about to kill Iceman and Nightcrawler, he is ambushed by Glob Herman, Anole, and No-Girl. Storm and Magik manage to track down Sapna, but they find her under the control of the World Eater. Sapna steals Magik's sword and begins leading the World Eater to Limbo so it can destroy it as it did the many other realms Storm and Magik passed through earlier. Magik reopens the portal so she and Storm can convince the mystics who attacked them earlier to help them stop Sapna and the World Eater before it consumes Limbo. As Colossus' students keep him busy, Forge and Cerebra capture him and take him back to X-Haven where he can hopefully be cured. Storm and Magik reunite with the mystics, who inform them that the Soul Eater takes over each realm in "The Lattice" (a series of worlds that Limbo is connected to) and needs a host from each world in order to travel The Lattice and feed. Sapna leads the World Eater and an army of demons directly to X-Haven. The X-Men all try unsuccessfully to thwart the invasion and Magik and Storm combine powers with the mystics to open a portal straight to X-Haven. Nightcrawler makes a deal to free Apocalypse from X-Haven if he reverts Colossus to his original state. Apocalypse agrees and right after Colossus changes back Nightcrawler "frees" Apocalypse by teleporting him into the mouth of the World Eater. Magik battles Sapna and manages to reclaim her sword and is forced to kill her former pupil to save X-Haven. Three days later Magik hears Sapna's voice coming from her sword.

=== Inhumans vs X-Men ===
Storm, Forge, and Old Man Logan return from their meeting with Beast, but Storm is left with conflicted feelings and refuses to confide in her team. She discusses her reservations about potentially leading the X-Men to war against the Inhumans with Logan, who reassures her that no matter what she decides he will always follow her lead. Storm is about to inform her team about the meeting and its implications for the future, when she is called to meet a mutant child dying of M-Pox. The child's death convinces Storm to lead the X-Men into war against the Inhumans since there isn't a cure to save mutants from the Terrigen Mist.

Forge constructs a machine that will change the structure of the Terrigen Mist so it could be destroyed. Storm sends Logan and Forge to guard it from the Inhumans. Despite Forge's attempts to reach out to Storm emotionally she continues to rebuff him, causing him to feel unwanted and unappreciated. Moments before Storm is about to lead the charge against the Inhumans, she opens up to Forge about how she feels and acknowledges that a part of her will always love him.

During a massive battle against the Inhumans, Magik continues to hear Sapna's voice coming from her sword until Sapna pulls Magik's soul into the sword. Magik discovers that while her soul is stuck inside of her sword, her body is frozen in the real world and susceptible to attack. She convinces Sapna to let her go and together they manage to open a portal to free Magik's soul. Sapna's soul remains in the sword, but she is now able to reveal her astral form to Magik.

After the war ends and Medusa destroys the Terrigen, the mutants no longer need to stay at X-Haven so the X-Men help the mutant refugees return to their homes on earth. No-Girl receives a distress call from Cerebra and manages to find her damaged body, destroyed after Emma Frost released an onslaught of Sentinels programmed to massacre the Inhumans accidentally attacked Cerebra in the crossfire. To save Cerebra, No-Girl returns to her original form and uploads Cerebra into her current one. With X-Haven now completely vacated, Storm wonders how to move the X-Men forward and feels guilty for leading them to war when they could have found a diplomatic solution. To put everyone's mind at ease, Iceman initiates a game of baseball with the X-Men and for the first time in a while they feel happy in that moment.

== Collected editions ==
#	Title	Material collected	Pages	Publication date	ISBN
1	X-Haven	Extraordinary X-Men #1-5	120	November 1, 2015	978-0785199342
2	Apocalypse Wars	Extraordinary X-Men #6-12	168	May 10, 2016	978-0785199359
3	Kingdoms Fall	Extraordinary X-Men #13-16, Annual	128	February 28, 2017	978-0785199366
4	IvX	Extraordinary X-Men #17-20	112	August 8, 2017	978-0785199373
