= X-Men Gold =

Comic book series

- Cover for X-Men: Gold No. 1 (April 2017); Art by Ardian Syaf & Jay Leisten

Publication information
- Publisher: Marvel Comics
- Schedule: Semimonthly
- Publication date: April 2017 – September 2018
- No. of issues: 36 (plus 2 Annuals and 1 Special)
- Main character(s): Colossus; Kitty Pryde; Nightcrawler; Logan; Prestige; Storm

Creative team as of April 2017
- Written by: Marc Guggenheim
- Artist(s): Ardian Syaf; R.B. Silva; Ken Lashley

Collected editions
- Back to Basics: ISBN 978-1302907303

X-Men: Gold is a comic book series published by Marvel Comics and initially created by writer Marc Guggenheim and artist Ardian Syaf. This series builds off of plot points established in X-Men Prime. The first issue was released April 5, 2017, with the last issue released on September 19, 2018.

== Publication history ==
X-Men: Gold and its sister book, X-Men Blue, were created following the crossover series Inhumans vs. X-Men. The new titles were announced October 21, 2016, as part of the ResurrXion brand. The color-coded names are a reference to storylines from the early 1990s when various comics in the X-Men franchise were best-sellers. The first issue was released April 5, 2017 and subsequent issues were released twice monthly. In February 2018, the spin-off sister book X-Men Red was released.

In September 2018, the series ended at issue 36 as part of Marvel's Fresh Start initiative.

== Plot summary ==
=== "Back to Basics" ===
The series begins with politician Lydia Nance justifying why she is so strongly against mutants during a televised interview. Meanwhile, Kitty Pryde leads her new team of X-Men against Terrax as civilians gather to watch the battle. After the battle ends and Terrax is subdued, Kitty attempts to address the onlookers with a speech about how the X-Men can be heroes for everyone, but is unsuccessful as the public view of the X-Men has been darkened ever since their feud with the Inhumans. Kitty faces even more hardships when the government provides her with an increasing amount of paperwork due to the X-Men now living in Central Park. After almost having an awkward reunion with Colossus, Prestige informs the team that a group of mutants are attacking the city. The X-Men arrive at the United Nations building and find it under attack by a brand new Brotherhood of Mutants, now including the X-Men's old ally Magma and new mutants who have taken over the mantles of Pyro and Avalanche. During the ensuing battle, Mesmero captures Logan and the Brotherhood teleports away. S.H.I.E.L.D. arrives on the scene and shows Kitty footage of Nance using the X-Men's fight against the Brotherhood as a means of stirring up paranoia of an impending race-war. The Brotherhood only fuels Nance's anti-mutant stance further when they announce that they kidnapped the mayor and intend to execute him in 24 hours, leading to Nance suggesting mutant-deportation. Logan attempts to escape but ends up under Mesmero's control. The X-Men find the Brotherhood's base and Logan attempts to ambush them until Storm manages to subdue him. Prestige manages to defeat Mesmero, and it is revealed that Magma was under his control. Not knowing what's real and what isn't anymore, she attacks Kitty and almost burns the whole building down. Kitty manages to get through to her and together they all escape the building and S.H.I.E.L.D. arrests the remainder of the Brotherhood, save for one, Kologoth, who appears to not be a mutant at all. Curious about this alien creature who is only able to communicate using a strange language, the X-Men take him captive and imprison him in the basement of the school. After Prestige realizes that the entire Brotherhood was under Mesmero's control after he was employed by Nance to stir up anti-mutant hysteria by any means necessary, the X-Men visit Nance personally and threaten to expose her if she continues her campaign.

Gambit is hired to steal a supposedly empty vial. Upon returning to his new employer he realizes that it is Olivia Trask, granddaughter of Bolivar Trask. Gambit then angrily discovers that the vial is not empty and contains nanites. Gambit attempts to destroy the vial so Trask cannot use the nanites, but they escape and take on the form of a Sentinel. Gambit calls the X-Men for help. Storm manages to rescue Gambit just before the Sentinel is able to kill him. While the rest of the X-Men clear civilians, Kitty uses her phasing power to disrupt the Sentinel. As it dissipates Prestige falls unconscious due to massive psychic backlash, revealing that this new Sentinel is sentient and capable of learning from past encounters. Lydia Nance uses this latest incident to label the X-Men as terrorists as their fight against the Sentinel caused major damage to a nearby skyscraper. Meanwhile, the Sentinel reforms and uses a telepathic attack to kill everyone with genetic differences instead of only mutants. S.H.I.E.L.D. and other heroes soon join the X-Men to help disperse the crowd and fight off the exponentially increasing onslaught. While unconscious, Prestige telepathically discusses her fears of what the future given her own history and legacy with astral versions of her deceased family. Upon waking up she unleashes the full magnitude of her powers to destroy the Sentinel's consciousness, leaving her unsure of how using her powers like that will affect her in the future. As the X-Men and other heroes leave after making sure all of the civilians are safe, the Sentinel reforms underneath the rubble.

=== "Evil Empires" ===
Colossus took on critical injuries during the battle against the Sentinel that left him unable to change his body into steel. Prestige kisses Nightcrawler after having figured out his attraction to her given the stronger nature of her psychic powers. Before they can discuss their blossoming relationship further they realize that Manhattan is becoming shrouded in the Darkforce Dimension. After communing with Doctor Strange about what to do Kitty sends Storm, Logan, and Nightcrawler to handle crowd control. Nightcrawler immediately gets attacked by a frightened mob who thinks he's one of the Darkforce demons. Meanwhile, the X-Men learn that a serial killer has infiltrated the mansion in the chaos and has started killing the students. It's revealed that the killer is a new X-Cutioner and just as he's about to murder Eye-Boy, he is discovered by Kitty, Colossus, and Prestige. X-Cutioner shoots directly at Colossus. Prestige manages to divert his attack and allow Kitty a chance to fight him. Logan and Storm manage to disperse the mob beating Nightcrawler and find him miraculously alive despite the severe and lethal nature of his injuries; Nightcrawler claims that Heaven won't accept him after he escaped the first time. Kitty ends up fighting X-Cutioner on her own after everyone else is evacuated from the mansion. Before beating him she learns that mutants killed his wife and son and blames all mutants for fighting each other with no regard for humans in the crossfire. He shoots at Kitty but Colossus intercepts the shot with his shoulder. After X-Cutioner is arrested Kitty receives a congressional summons for a meeting about a new bill regarding mutant deportation.

In Russia, a resurrection ritual begins taking place. Back in the States, Kitty and Colossus travel to Washington DC where they rendezvous with Stevie Hunter, who now works in Congress. Hunter helps prepare Kitty and Peter for the meeting. Meanwhile, Rachel and Kurt finally go on their first date together and discuss Rachel's fears of what her heightened powers after the Sentinel incident may mean for her future. After Kitty speaks to the congressmen, Peter invites her to dinner where they acknowledge that there is still an attraction between them leading to Peter suggesting that if they were to get back together then the only way they could move forward is via eventual marriage. The next day Kitty returns to speak with Congress again but the meeting is interrupted by Whiplash, who has a grudge against Congress and attempts to assassinate them. Even though Kitty and Peter manage to stop him and save the congressmen, Hunter regretfully informs them that it did not change their minds and the bill on mutant deportation is going to be passed. Back in Russia, it is revealed that Omega Red has come back to life.

Omega Red adjusts to his newly resurrected life but knows that the resurrection is only temporary, causing him to seek out a way to remain alive. A short while later Colossus receives a mysterious phone call from an uncle he never met named Anatoly Rasputin, who informs Colossus about Omega Red's mysterious resurrection. Colossus and Magik take the X-Men to Russia with them to survey their meeting with Anatoly. Shortly after Colossus and Magik meet Anatoly, they are ambushed by monsters imbued with magic. As the rest of the X-Men reveal themselves and join in the fight, Illyana ends up captured as and the mob leaves. It is soon revealed that Omega Red needs Illyana's powers as Magik for his resurrection to remain permanent. Peter agrees to let Anatoly lead him to the rest of the mob so they can find Magik, but once they find the mob Anatoly double crosses him. Peter and Nightcrawler manage to find Magik and free her. Omega Red meanwhile ambushes Logan, Storm, and Kitty. After easily defeating Storm and Kitty he fights Logan, seeking vengeance for Logan having killed him in the past. Logan manages to best Omega Red again. As Magik tries to interrogate Anatoly, he uses his own magic abilities to fight back and almost kills her until Peter finally becomes able to reuse his abilities again and stops his uncle. After Anatoly is arrested for his crimes with the Russian mob, Kitty and Peter officially get back together as a couple.

=== "Mojo Worldwide" ===
When Kitty decides to invite the X-Men Blue team to the mansion, their reunion is interrupted by three floating objects that land in various areas of New York. The Blue and Gold teams join forces and split off into groups to investigate. When they come into contact with the objects, a powerful force fields surrounds them that they are unable to escape from. The force fields create virtual reality constructs of Asgard, Inferno and the Future that Rachel came from. Their clothing is transformed and the teams begin to fight off approaching enemies. It is revealed that Mojo, in an effort to boost his ratings, is creating a special "greatest hits" show that recreates famous X-Men battles from throughout their history and that he is broadcasting it live to audiences across the multiverse. The first team, consisting of Kitty, Prestige, Cyclops and Bloodstorm, try to rescue civilians in the Future but they are interrupted by Mojo who broadcasts his face onto an army of Sentinels. Proving to them that the threats they face are real and not simply special effects, impales Bloodstorm on a metal spear, killing her. Prestige managed to psychically contact Logan, Storm and the time-displaced Angel and Iceman who are trapped in Asgard battling Frost Trolls and Nightcrawler, Colossus, Poison and the young Beast and Marvel Girl who are fighting demons in Inferno to tell them that Mojo is behind everything. The first team is rescued from the Sentinels by Longshot, who has hacked into Mojo's system and is broadcasting his adventures to his own subscribers. Mojo becomes angry when he is informed that his ratings are not rising as quickly as he expected so he begins showering his audience with gifts and encourages them to vote on which scenario they would like to see the X-Men face using an app.

Transported to Asteroid M, Longshot, Kitty, Prestige and Cyclops are forced to fight a simulated version Magneto before being placed in an Avengers vs. X-Men scenario. Meanwhile, Logan, Storm, Iceman and Angel are sent to the X-Tinction Agenda where they come under attack by the Magistrates and the Press Gang who swiftly kill the entire team. Meanwhile, Marvel Girl, Beast, Jimmy, Colossus and Nightcrawler are still fighting demons and are confronted by a simulation of the Goblin Queen who Jean manages to defeat, causing the team to be teleported to the Savage Land. Mojo is delighted when Polaris, Danger and the real Magneto arrive to rescue the X-Men, sending them into the Morlock tunnels to face Apocalypse and the Marauders. Longshot manages to teleport his team away from the Avengers and into the Savage Land where they regroup with the surviving X-Men. They discover that the X-Men that were "killed" previously are behind held in stasis in Mojoworld and free them. Magneto, Polaris and Danger defeat Apocalypse but then come face-to-face with the Shi'ar and Krakoa although Danger manages to free them from the simulation. While the rest of the X-Men engage Spiral and Mojo's forces, Kitty finds out the location of Mojo's control room. The team reach the control room for their final showdown with Mojo, who leeches energy from his viewers to increase his strength. He appears to be getting the upper hand until Magneto and Polaris arrive and combine their powers to create an EMP that disables his broadcasting technology, leaving him helpless. Kitty berates the young X-Men for working with Magneto and confronts Magneto about his actions but Colossus convinces her to stand down. After teleporting away, Mojo and his crew are stranded on Earth but manage to set up their own news network.

=== "The Negative Zone War" ===
Unknown to the X-Men, Kologoth was secretly released by the mutant serial killer, escaped the school and contacted his allies on their home planet. Despite Kitty's efforts, Congress votes to pass Nance's mutant deportation bill, prompting protests by mutants around the country. Kitty and Colossus' relationship begins to develop. The mansion is attacked by alien forces who have come to rescue Kologoth. While Kitty and Nightcrawler sneak into the ship, Rachel is gravely injured by its powerful lasers. The ship picks up Kologoth and disappears through a wormhole. The rest of the X-Men track the ship to the Negative Zone where they come into contact with the government of Kologoth's home planet's who explain that Kologoth and his forces are trying to take over the planet and must be stopped. Kologoth offers to let the X-Men have Kitty, who was captured aboard the ship as long as they leave the planet immediately but they refuse, asking him to reveal the location of Nightcrawler who had escaped his prison. The X-Men engage Kologoth and his forces but Kologoth revives an old God before he is killed by Logan. Reunited with Nightcrawler, the X-Men trap the God in the centre of the Negative Zone but end up crash-landing their ship on an unknown desert planet. After escaping from the planet, Kitty asks Colossus to marry her.

=== "Cruel and Unusual" ===
Following events in the Negative Zone, Logan leaves the team. Mesmero breaks himself, Pyro and Avalanche out of prison and the three seek revenge on Nance after their actions as the Brotherhood on her behalf ruined their lives. After being defeated by the X-Men and imprisoned, Mesmero breaks them out and the three plan to get revenge on Nance for ruining their lives although Pyro refuses to kill her. The X-Men, joined by Magma who wants to apprehend Mesmero personally for mind-controlling her, arrive and rescue Nance but they are defeated by the Brotherhood. Mesmero manipulates the X-Men into attacking the police and the team are arrested. Kitty is visited in jail by She-Hulk, who informs her that she is unable to get the team released. Pyro, realising that Nance was behind all of it, leaves the Brotherhood, not wanting to be a criminal. While the X-Men are in prison, Iceman and Rogue are brought in to lead a replacement team consisting of Magma, Magik, Armor, and Ink alongside Pyro, who arrives wanting to make amends for his actions. They rendezvous with Captain Britain and Meggan in Paris where a giant creature from the Negative Zone is attacking. Storm escapes from her cell and convinces the warden to let the rest of her team go so that they can join the other X-Men to tackle the threat.

=== "Til' Death Do Us Part" ===
Gambit tracks down Mesmero and the team apprehend him. Kitty allows Pyro to remain on the team as long as Iceman keeps a close eye on him. During Colossus' bachelor party, an advanced sentinel kidnaps him and takes him to Nance who is hiding out in a secret facility in the Savage Land where she and her sentinel plan to use his blood to create a virus that will kill any mutant that it comes into contact with. Rachel uses her abilities to track Colossus' location and the team arrive to try and free him but are distracted by Nance and her sentinel, who buy enough time for a rocket holding Colossus to be launched into space. They capture Nance and Kitty instructs Iceman and Pyro to watch over her while the rest of the team visit Puck who provides them with a ship so that they can launch a rescue mission. The X-Men arrive too late and the sentinel has already launched Nance's virus but Storm, Puck and Pyro manage to successfully destroy the virus before it reaches Earth. Kitty finds a gravely injured Colossus and stays by his bedside while he recovers in the hospital. At Kitty and Colossus' rehearsal dinner, Magik confesses to Kitty that she think she and her brother should not get married. On the day of the wedding, the X-Men gather to celebrate but, when Colossus attempts to put the ring onto Kitty's finger, she phases through it and phases through the ground, leaving Colossus alone at the altar. At the reception, Magik expresses her guilt to Rogue, believing that Kitty leaving Colossus was her fault. Colossus and Kitty reconcile and give their blessing for Gambit to propose to Rogue. The rabbi marries Gambit and Rogue and the X-Men watch on as they share their first kiss as husband and wife.

=== "Godwar" ===
Although the two have reached an understanding, Colossus admits to Kitty that it is too painful for him to stay at the X-Mansion and he leaves the team. Rachel awakens to find that Mesmero has broken out of prison again and manipulates her into attacking the other X-Men by making her believe she is a mutant hunter. Iceman and Pyro spend the night together but rush upstairs when they hear the commotion and find Nightcrawler has been knocked out. Magik meets with Storm, who convinces her that she was not to blame for Colossus leaving. Rachel attacks them, putting Magik to sleep and using a sentinel to incapacitate Storm before psychically knocking out Psylocke and Armor. Young Cyclops manages to convince her that what she is seeing is not real and Jean Grey explores her mind, ensuring that no trace of Mesmero remains there. Following this trauma, Rachel breaks up with Nightcrawler. Storm is summoned to Wakanda where she finds out that her adoptive mother was murdered by a cult who killed her after she refused to forsake her goddess and worship theirs. Revealing that the goddess they worshipped was her, Storm heads to the village and vows to eject the cult. Storm finds that they have been keeping the bodies of those they have murdered in catacombs below the village rather than burying them in accordance with tradition. The dead begin to rise and begin to attack Storm but she is saved by the arrival of the other X-Men and they manage to liberate Storm's village. Storm vows never to abandon the village again. The X-Men are called when a young boy exhibits Omega-level powers that cause extensive damage to a neighbourhood. Just when Kitty is making headway in helping him regain control, a human bystander shoots the mutant so Nightcrawler teleports him to a hospital where the doctor refuses to help for fear that the boy's powers will reactivate and kill everyone there. Kitty considers having Rachel force the doctor to perform surgery but she is interrupted by another doctor who says that she will attempt to save the boy's life. She reveals that she was an anti-mutant protestor whose mind was changed after seeing Kitty and the other X-Men fight for human lives and well as those of mutants.

== Team roster ==
Character	Real name	Joined in	Notes
Shadowcat	Kitty Pryde	X-Men: Gold #1 (April 2017)	Team leader
Storm	Ororo Munroe	X-Men: Gold #1 (April 2017)	
Prestige	Rachel Summers	X-Men: Gold #1 (April 2017)	
Colossus	Peter Rasputin	X-Men: Gold #1 (April 2017)	Left the team in X-Men: Gold #31 (September 2018)
Nightcrawler	Kurt Wagner	X-Men: Gold #1 (April 2017)	
Old Man Logan	James Howlett	X-Men: Gold #1 (April 2017)	Alternate version from a dystopian future. Left the team in X-Men: Gold #21 (April 2018)
Armor	Hisako Ichiki	X-Men: Gold #17 (December 2017)	A temporary team led by Iceman when Kitty and her team were in prison. Iceman, Rogue and Pyro join the main team in No. 25.
Ink	Eric Gitter	X-Men: Gold #17 (December 2017)	A temporary team led by Iceman when Kitty and her team were in prison. Iceman, Rogue and Pyro join the main team in No. 25.
Magma	Amara Aquilla	X-Men: Gold #21 (February 2018)	A temporary team led by Iceman when Kitty and her team were in prison. Iceman, Rogue and Pyro join the main team in No. 25.
Iceman	Robert "Bobby" Drake	X-Men: Gold #23 (March 2018)	A temporary team led by Iceman when Kitty and her team were in prison. Iceman, Rogue and Pyro join the main team in No. 25.
Rogue	Anna Marie	X-Men: Gold #23 (March 2018)	A temporary team led by Iceman when Kitty and her team were in prison. Iceman, Rogue and Pyro join the main team in No. 25.
Magik	Illyana Rasputin	X-Men: Gold #23 (March 2018)	A temporary team led by Iceman when Kitty and her team were in prison. Iceman, Rogue and Pyro join the main team in No. 25.
Pyro	Simon Lasker	X-Men: Gold #23 (March 2018)	A temporary team led by Iceman when Kitty and her team were in prison. Iceman, Rogue and Pyro join the main team in No. 25.
Gambit	Remy LeBeau	X-Men: Gold #26 (April 2018)	

== Critical reception ==
According to review aggregator Comic Book Roundup, the first issue received an average score of 7.7 out of 10 based on 29 critical reviews.

=== Controversy ===
In the first issue, Colossus wears a shirt with "QS 5:51" printed on the chest. It represents a verse from the Quran, Surah Al-Ma'idah 5 verse 51, which reads:

O you who have believed, do not take the Jews and the Christians as allies. They are [in fact] allies of one another. And whoever is an ally to them among you – then indeed, he is [one] of them. Indeed, Allah guides not the wrongdoing people.

The verse was topical at the time of printing in Jakarta, Indonesia, where penciller Ardian Syaf lives. During the governor election in Jakarta, the sitting governor, Basuki Tjahaja Purnama, was being attacked by opponents for being a minority Chinese Christian. The Quran verse QS 5:51 was being used as justification to pressure Muslim voters not to vote for a non-Muslim leader such as Purnama. Syaf admitted on Facebook to have participated in these protests and drew the scene after attending one.

On April 8, 2017, Marvel released a statement via ComicBook.com.

The mentioned artwork in X-Men Gold No. 1 was inserted without knowledge behind its reported meanings. These implied references do not reflect the views of the writer, editors or anyone else at Marvel and are in direct opposition of the inclusiveness of Marvel Comics and what the X-Men have stood for since their creation. This artwork will be removed from subsequent printings, digital versions, and trade paperbacks and disciplinary action is being taken.

As a result of his actions, Syaf was terminated from his position at Marvel.

== Collected editions ==
#	Title	Material collected	Pages	Publication date	ISBN
0	Homecoming	X-Men (1991) #70–79, X-Men/Dr. Doom Annual 1998, material from X-Men Unlimited (1993) No. 18	336	April 10, 2018	978-1302909543
1	Back to the Basics	X-Men Prime#1, X-Men: Gold #1–6	144	September 5, 2017	978-1302907303
2	Evil Empires	X-Men: Gold #7–12	136	November 28, 2017	978-1302907310
3	Mojo Worldwide	X-Men: Gold #13–15 and X-Men Blue #13–15	136	February 6, 2018	978-1302910891
4	The Negative Zone War	X-Men: Gold #16–20	136	April 10, 2018	978-1302909741
5	Cruel and Unusual	X-Men: Gold #21–25	136	June 12, 2018	978-1302909758
6	'Til Death Do Us Part	X-Men: Gold #26–30 and X-Men: The Wedding Special	136	August 21, 2018	978-1302909765
7	Godwar	X-Men: Gold #31–36 and Annual #1	136	December 4, 2018	978-1302909772
