= X-Men Blue =

Comic book series

- Cover for X-Men: Blue #1. Art by Art Adams

Publication information
- Publisher: Marvel Comics
- Schedule: Semimonthly
- Publication date: April 2017 – September 2018
- No. of issues: 36 (plus 1 Annual)
- Main character: List: Angel Beast Bloodstorm Cyclops Iceman Jimmy Hudson Marvel Girl Magneto

Creative team as of April 2017
- Created by: Stan Lee; Jack Kirby
- Written by: Cullen Bunn
- Penciller(s): Jorge Molina; Matteo Buffagani
- Colorist: Matt Milla

Collected editions
- Strangest: ISBN 978-1302907280

X-Men: Blue was an ongoing comic book published twice monthly by Marvel Comics and initially created by writer Cullen Bunn and artist Jorge Molina. The first issue was released April 12, 2017. It is a continuation of the All New X-Men series that began in 2012 and features young members of the original X-Men team who have time traveled to the present day.

== Publication history ==
X-Men Blue and its sister book, X-Men Gold, were created following the crossover series Inhumans vs. X-Men. The new titles were announced October 21, 2016, as part of the ResurrXion brand. The color-coded names are a reference to storylines from the early 1990s, when various comics in the X-Men franchise were best-sellers. The first issue was released April 12, 2017, and subsequent issues were released twice monthly. The storyline in X-Men: Blue is a continuation of the 2012 series All New X-Men. Jamie McKelvie designed the costumes for the five time-displaced original X-Men. McKelvie commented that he "wanted to reference past incarnations of the characters, while at the same time coming up with something new and cohesive for the team. I wanted them to be individuals, but when you looked at them as a whole, they're clearly a team. I took my main inspiration from modern Olympic and fitness wear outfits, which use a lot of bold shapes and colours. I also paid tribute to Frank Quitely's New X-Men designs in the shapes of the boots and jackets".

In February 2018, the spin-off sister book X-Men Red was released. The main cast of the book departed to a space mission, narrated in the "Poison-X" arc of the Venom comic book, which set up the Venomized crossover. Their absence was used to establish a new line-up.

In September 2018, the series ended with issue 36. The story of the time-displaced X-Men is concluded in the Extermination event, part of Marvel's Fresh Start initiative.

== Fictional team history ==
=== Strangest ===
After learning they are from a different timeline, the time-displaced X-Men leave X-Haven to find their place in the world. They align themselves with their former enemy, Magneto, and operate in secret out of a base in Madripoor. Under Jean Grey's leadership, they defeat Black Tom Cassidy, Juggernaut, and a group of mutant sentinels in Barcelona led by Bastion. Unknown to the team, Magneto is secretly building a Time Platform to send the young X-Men back to their time period of origin.

After learning of a Wendigo-related disturbance in the North, the X-Men investigate alongside a local sheriff named Kira Lee and encounter an amnesiac Jimmy Hudson, who helps defeat the Wendigo, on the run from other mutants who also came from the Ultimate Marvel universe. During the ensuing battle Jean ends up in telepathic contact with Miss Sinister, who takes a keen interest in her. After the battle ends they decide to bring Jimmy with them to join their team instead of sending him to the school with Kitty Pryde in order to better protect him and keep him under the radar. While exploring Madripoor during a festival on a night off, Jean, Beast and Jimmy confront a group of mutants, known as the Raksha, who were buying a chemical from a local dealer. Upon seeing Jimmy's claws the Raksha voluntarily end the fight, acknowledging the X-Men as allies due to everyone involved having a positive history with Wolverine.

=== Toil and Trouble ===
During the Secret Empire storyline, the team rebels against the government of New Tian, located somewhere in California, following Hydra's takeover of the United States. While in their hideout, they are attacked by Havok, Archangel, Marrow, Firestar, Wolfsbane, Mondo, and Toad who were sent by Emma Frost. Each of them exhibited much stronger abilities which Beast concludes is due to secondary mutations. While Jean and Jimmy escape, the rest of the team is captured. Emma then talks to Cyclops in his cell. As Jean and Jimmy regroup and plan their next move they are rescued by Danger, who stages a series of elaborate holograms to keep Emma's forces occupied. The rest of the team begins to lose hope as Emma begins telepathically tormenting Cyclops. Havok is about to intercept Jean and Jimmy when he is suddenly ambushed by Polaris. While Polaris fights Havok, Jean and Jimmy manage to rescue their teammates and Briar until they're caught by Emma, who has upgraded her powers using a fragment of the Cosmic Cube, allowing her to take control of Cyclops and force him to attack his teammates. Jean manages to release Cyclops from Emma's mental control and the team successfully escapes. Meanwhile, Magneto speaks with Steve Rogers about the team's recent actions and Emma and Havok meet with Miss Sinister and Bastion.

Sometime later, it's revealed that Beast has learned his magic from the Goblin Queen, who was using him to free a group of demons known as the Hex-Men who take the form of Pixie, Colossus, Bloodstorm and Nightcrawler so that she may begin a dark ritual to summon her fellow Queens to take the world as their own. Danger trains Iceman and notes that he is distracted which could endanger the team during a fight because his boyfriend Romeo has stopped replying to his calls and messages. Jean and Scott find out that, when she released him from Emma's mind control, that a unique, unbreakable connection had formed between them meaning that they will always be able to read each other's minds. This initially causes some conflict as Jean discovers that Scott is jealous of her budding relationship with Jimmy. While trying to make sense of their new connection, the pair almost kiss but are interrupted by a massive explosion as the Goblin Queen begins her attack. The team confronts the Goblin Queen and the Hex-Men, seeing Beast transformed into a demonic creature. During the battle, Jean and Scott manage to escape with help from the teleporting demon Pickles and enlist the aid of the Raksha. Back at the mansion, the Goblin Queen and the Hex-Men manage to capture the rest of the team and begin a ritual to summon the Goblin Queen's sisters. During the ritual, Jean, Scott and the Rashka infiltrate the mansion and battle the Goblin Queen's demons. Bloodstorm realizes that the promises made to her by the Goblin Queen are false and that she will dispose of the Hex-Men once her sisters have been summoned so she betrays her and convinces Beast to break the Goblin Queen's hold on him and banish her to the hellish dimension where her sisters have been trapped. In the aftermath, Bloodstorm is welcomed into the team despite her worries that she will massacre them as she did to the X-Men of her own reality.

Meanwhile, Angel and Jimmy return to Colorado and join forces with Kira to investigate Jimmy's mysterious past only to discover a hidden lab where they find Blob, who had been experimented on by Miss Sinister. When they enter, a special holographic message from Miss Sinister activates because it is attuned to Jimmy's genetic code but Angel turns it off before they can hear what she has to say because he believes she is trying to manipulate them. Angel, Kira and Jimmy battle Blob until he starts to melt as a side effect of the experiments and Angel vows to help him. They realise that the mutants that attacked them in New Tian must have been experimented on by Miss Sinister as well, meaning their powers were not because of secondary mutations. After finding the bodies of dead mutants, they theorise that the experiments, which Sinister refers to as "Mothervine" must be harmful to mutants, killing some but greatly powering up those who survive.

=== "Mojo Worldwide" ===
When the team are invited to the Xavier Institute by Kitty, their reunion is interrupted by three floating objects that land in various areas of New York. The Blue and Gold teams join forces and split off into groups to investigate. When they come into contact with the objects, a powerful force fields surrounds them that they are unable to escape from. The force fields create virtual reality constructs of Asgard, Inferno and the Future that Rachel came from. Their clothing is transformed and the teams begin to fight off approaching enemies. It is revealed that Mojo, in an effort to boost his ratings, is creating a special "greatest hits" show that recreates famous X-Men battles from throughout their history and that he is broadcasting it live to audiences across the multiverse. The first team, consisting of Kitty, Prestige, Cyclops and Bloodstorm, try to rescue civilians in the Future but they are interrupted by Mojo who broadcasts his face onto an army of Sentinels. Proving to them that the threats they face are real and not simply special effects, impales Bloodstorm on a metal spear, killing her. Prestige used Scott and Jean's psychic connection to boost her own telepathy, enabling her to contact Logan, Storm, Angel and Iceman who are trapped in Asgard battling Frost Trolls and Nightcrawler, Colossus, Jimmy, Beast and Marvel Girl who are fighting demons in Inferno to tell them that Mojo is behind everything. The first team is rescued from the Sentinels by Longshot, who has hacked into Mojo's system and is broadcasting his adventures to his own subscribers. Mojo becomes angry when he is informed that his ratings are not rising as quickly as he expected so he begins showering his audience with gifts and encourages them to vote on which scenario they would like to see the X-Men face using an app.

Transported to Asteroid M, Longshot, Kitty, Prestige and Cyclops are forced to fight a simulation of Magneto. Scott then admits that the Blue Team have been working with Magneto and concludes that they never should have agreed as it is impossible for someone to change their behaviour so significantly. Meanwhile, Logan, Storm, Iceman and Angel are sent to the X-Tinction Agenda where they come under attack by the Magistrates and the Press Gang who swiftly kill the entire team. Meanwhile, Marvel Girl, Beast, Jimmy, Colossus and Nightcrawler are still fighting demons and are confronted by a simulation of the Goblin Queen who Jean manages to defeat, causing the team to be teleported to the Savage Land. Mojo is delighted when Polaris, Danger and the real Magneto arrive to rescue the X-Men, sending them into the Morlock tunnels to face Apocalypse and the Marauders. Longshot manages to teleport his team away from the Avengers.Still in the Savage land, Hank uses magic to fight off their enemies, much to the concern of Jean. Longshot and the others arrive and the surviving X-Men regroup before freeing the X-Men that had previously been “killed” from stasis chambers on Mojoworld. Magneto, Polaris and Danger defeat Apocalypse but then come face-to-face with the Shi'ar and Krakoa although Danger manages to free them from the simulation. While the rest of the X-Men engage Spiral and Mojo's forces, Kitty finds out the location of Mojo's control room. The team reach the control room for their final showdown with Mojo, who leeches energy from his viewers to increase his strength. He appears to be getting the upper hand until Magento and Polaris arrive and combine their powers to create an EMP that disables his broadcasting technology, leaving him helpless. Kitty berates the young X-Men for working with Magneto and confronts Magneto about his actions but Colossus convinces her to stand down. After teleporting away, Mojo and his crew are stranded on Earth but manage to set up their own news network.

=== "Cross Time Capers" ===
The X-Men return to Magneto's mansion in Madripoor. Jean, concerned about Hank after he attempted to cast more spells, starts keeping an eye on him although Hank believes she is only hanging out with him in order to stay away from Scott, who she has started developing feelings for. Scott also tries to separate himself from Jean (even though their psychic rapport means the pair can never truly be alone) and grows closer to Bloodstorm, who he realizes he has more in common with than he first thought. Bobby watches Mojo's new television show in which contestants attempt to survive a day being hunted by various creatures to win a cash prize. Polaris and Angel train Jimmy but they are interrupted when Polaris suddenly disappears. Sensing this, Jean and Hank rush to Magneto who instructs her to read his mind. Jean discovers that Magneto has somehow been communicating with Professor Xavier from beyond the grave and, before disappearing, Magneto orders them into the labs underneath the mansion. The X-Men find out that Magneto had been secretly building a time machine to send them back home and, believing they are to blame for the disappearances, Hank activates the machine in the hope that returning to their original time will fix the timestream. The machine mistakenly sends the team to 2099 where they are confronted by the X-Men of that timeline. Hank explains that he believes something has happened in their original time and, because the X-Men were not there to stop it, ripples through time are erasing people from existence. They find out 2099 is a dystopian future where the original five X-Men have destroyed the planet and leave most people to starve and die. Horrified, Hank and the team travel to another time in the hope of rewriting history so that this future will never happen. The device sends them to the wrong time period again and the X-Men are forced to battle the students of Generation X but the battle is interrupted by the student's teachers Banshee and Emma Frost, who reveal that the original X-Men turned on them and decimated any attempts at resistance. Hank finally manages to teleport the team back to their original time.

In the past, due to the absence of the X-Men when they travelled to the future, evil versions of the original X-Men from an alternate reality led by Professor X took their place and killed Magneto using a nuclear missile. That time's original Xavier is kept hooked up to Cerebro but somehow managed to send a message through time to Magneto in the present asking for help. Hank manages to rescue Magneto just before his death and he reluctantly teams up with the X-Men. It is revealed that the evil X-Men are actually the Brotherhood of Mutants, who were last encountered by the team during the "Battle of the Atom" storyline. The teams engage each other in combat, with Beast teleporting in the 2099 X-Men and Generation X while Jean locates and rescues their Professor X from Cerebro. The Brotherhood jump back into the timestream before they can be apprehended and the X-Men have a tearful reunion with their Xavier, who explains that there is still things they must do before they can stay in their time, noting that when they do return for good, it must be from the exact moment in which they left. Sending them back to the present, the X-Men find that Magneto and the others have returned with no memory of what has happened, although Bobby quickly fills him in. The X-Men are disheartened that they must eventually return to the original time, with Bobby particularly upset that all of their growth as people will be undone. Magneto finds the Brotherhood in the timestream and kills them for what they have done.

=== "Poison X" ===
During Scott's video call between Scott and his father Corsair, he and the rest of the Starjammers are attacked by people wearing symbiotes. Before the call cuts off, Corsair shouts some co-ordinates to Scott which are also heard by Jean via their psychic rapport. Hoping to find answers, the X-Men intercept Venom during one of his missions. While Eddie Brock refuses to go with the X-Men, his Venom symbiote wants to learn more about what is going on and puts him to sleep so that the X-Men can question him. They locate the Starjammers' ship and are greeted by Raymond Sikorski, who hid during the attack and explains more about the symbiotes that were responsible. Fearful of the damager they can do, Venom agrees to help the X-Men. After barely surviving an encounter with some of the symbiotes, Scott is badly wounded and the X-Men retreat while Venom manages to track down the arms dealer responsible for selling the symbiotes however, once inside, a battle ensues causing some of the symbiotes to bond with the X-Men. The team board the ship of the symbiote-wearing bounty hunters who have been holding the Starjammers hostage and incapacitate them, enabling Scott to free his father. Jean's psychic link is suddenly severed and it is revealed that Poisons, special symbiotes that completely take over a host and turn them into a weapon, have boarded the ship and bonded with her, killing her.

=== "Cry Havok" ===
Magneto discovers that Emma Frost and the Hellfire Club are planning something and heads to their mansion to investigate, coming face to face with Sebastian Shaw whose powers have been augmented by Miss Sinister. Although they pretend to be in league with Miss Sinister and Bastion (who are planning to use their combined technology to cause an increase in the mutant population), Havok and Frost privately conspire to double cross them when the moment arises. Malice is revealed to have possessed Polaris and, although she manages to break free, Malice has already gravely injured the Raksha leaving only one, Gazing Nightshade, unharmed. Jimmy and Bloodstorm rescue Xorn from a group of Marauders and regroup with Polaris, Gazing Nightshade and new recruit Daken to form a new team of X-Men. Magneto meets with Miss Sinister, Bastion, Havok and Frost and tries to convince them to reconsider their actions but they refuse and defeat him. The group unleash their technology and mutants all over the world begin to develop new mutations that they are unable to control. Miss Sinister reveals that their technology also takes away their free will, allowing her to control them and, while Frost is taken aback, Havok explains that he knew all along and supports her plan. The X-Men do battle with the mutants and are captured while Magneto flees and meets with Exodus and Elixir who help him to heal the new mutants. Frost turns on Sinister and frees Jimmy, who kills Sinister, before releasing the rest of the X-Men. Xorn sacrifices himself to kill Bastion and Polaris, with Frost's help, breaks through to Havok and makes him see the error of his ways. Frost meets with Magneto, who vows to destroy her for what she has done. In the depths of space, a traumatised Cyclops is unable to come to terms with Jean's death and, despite having some difficulty, Beast manages to fly their ship back home.

=== "Surviving the Experience" ===
Following an invasion of Earth by the Poisons, which results in Jean being resurrected, the X-Men search for Jimmy, who was taken over by one of the last surviving Poisons. They track him to the woods where they try to break through to Jimmy and encourage him to fight against the Poison which is controlling him but they are interrupted by Daken who announces that Magneto has sent him to assassinate Jimmy. Jean lets Jimmy go off to find himself. Searching for Emma Frost, Magneto attacks several Hellfire Club parties and kills everyone in attendance. The X-Men investigate, shocked that Magneto is capable of such things but Bloodstorm explains that, while the X-Men were in space, Magneto was forced to kill some of the mind-controlled mutants he had sworn to protect and that he is now seeking revenge on those that caused it. The X-Men track Frost to France and offer to help protect her from Magneto, who subsequently attacks with powers enhanced using mutant growth hormone. After they help Frost escape, it becomes clear that Magneto is too powerful for the X-Men and, not wanting to kill the team he had mentored, Magneto leaves. Jean meets with her adult self and the two speak about their various resurrections. The younger Jean expresses her wish that they would have had more time to get to know one another but that the time-displaced X-Men must return to their original time soon. She expresses her sadness that their minds must all be erased of their experiences in the present so that they do not change things when they return to the past. Young Hank reconciles with the present version of Beast and asks him to find a way to make them forget who they are. During a game of pool with his older self, Bobby breaks down with the knowledge that he will be forced back into the closet when he returns to his original time. Iceman tries to reassure him that he will grow up to be someone awesome but younger Bobby admits that he quite likes the person he's become but the option to remain that person is no longer possible. Angel catches up to Archangel to say goodbye. Scott and Bloodstorm visit the adult Cyclops' grave and Scott comes to terms with the fact that he won't be a part of the future and that going back to their timeline is ensuring this. The X-Men meet in a Florida military base (the first place they became an official team in X-Men #1 in 1963) and resolve to tie up some loose ends. They destroy Mojo's new TV network, Scott says goodbye to Corsair and the Starjammers, and recruit the Raksha as official X-Men, who are to be trained by Danger and Polaris. At the X-Mansion, Jean and Scott finally give in to their feelings and share a kiss. As they prepare to travel back in time, they see a news report that Magneto has formed a new Brotherhood and is attacking a nearby city so the X-Men resolve to stay in the present for just a little while longer.

=== Time-displaced X-Men Roster ===
Headlined All-New X-Men in 2012 to 2017 and X-Men: Blue in 2017 to 2018.

Original members
Character	Real name
Cyclops	Scott Summers
Iceman	Robert Louis "Bobby" Drake
Beast	Henry Philip "Hank" McCoy
Marvel Girl / Phoenix	Jean Grey
Angel / Archangel	Warren Kenneth Worthington III

Recruits
Character	Real name	Joined in
Shadowcat	Kitty Pryde	X-Men: Battle of the Atom #2 (2013)
X-23 / Wolverine	Laura Kinney	All-New X-Men #20 (2013)
Oya	Idie Okonkwo	All-New X-Men vol. 2 #1 (2016)
Genesis	Evan Sabahnur	All-New X-Men vol. 2 #1 (2016)
Pickles		All-New X-Men vol. 2 #1 (2016)
Magneto	Max Eisenhardt	X-Men: Blue #1 (June 2017)
Poison	James Hudson Jr.	X-Men: Blue #6 (August 2017)
Bloodstorm	Ororo Munroe	X-Men: Blue #12 (November 2017)
Polaris	Lorna Dane	X-Men: Blue #25 (June 2018)
Xorn	Shen Xorn	X-Men: Blue #25 (June 2018)
Daken	Akihiro	X-Men: Blue #25 (June 2018)
Gazing Nightshade		X-Men: Blue #25 (June 2018)

Mentors
Character	Real name	Joined in
Danger	"Danger Room"	Revealed as the Blackbird in X-Men: Blue #8 (September 2018)
Briar Raleigh		X-Men: Blue #7 (September 2017)

== Critical reception ==
According to review aggregator Comic Book Roundup, the first issue received an average score of 7.8 out of 10 based on 26 critical reviews.

== Collected editions ==
#	Title	Material collected	Pages	Publication date	ISBN
0	Reunion	Uncanny X-Men #351-359, X-Men Unlimited #17, Uncanny X-Men/Fantastic Four Annual 1998 and excerpts from Cerebro's Guide To The X-Men	328	April 5, 2018	978-1302909536
1	Strangest	X-Men: Blue #1–6	144	September 5, 2017	978-1302907280
2	Toil and Trouble	X-Men: Blue #7–12	136	December 5, 2017	978-1302907297
X-Men: Gold Vol. 3: Mojo Worldwide		X-Men: Gold #13–15 and X-Men: Blue #13–15	136	February 6, 2018	978-1302910891
3	Cross-Time Capers	X-Men: Blue #16–20	136	April 3, 2018	978-1302909789
Venom & X-Men: Poison X		X-Men: Blue #21–22 & Annual #1, Venom #162–163 (story concluded in Venomized #1-5)	136	June 5, 2018	978-1302912253
4	Cry Havok	X-Men: Blue #23–28	144	August 7, 2018	978-1302909796
5	Surviving the Experience	X-Men: Blue #29–36	188	November 13, 2018	978-1302909802
