= Occupy Avengers =

Comic

Publication information
- Publisher: Marvel Comics
- Genre: Superhero
- Publication date: November 2016
- Main character(s): Hawkeye; Nightshade; Red Wolf

Creative team
- Created by: David Walker; Carlos Pacheco
- Written by: David Walker
- Artist: Carlos Pacheco
- Inker: Rafael Fonteriz
- Letterer: Clayton Cowles
- Colorist(s): Tom Brevoort; Darren Shan; Alanna Smith

Occupy Avengers is a comic book series by Marvel Comics.

== Publication history ==
Occupy Avengers details the story of Hawkeye, following the Civil War II storyline, where he will travel to places where superheroes are rarely seen to fight crime and gains allies along the way.

== Plot ==
Ever since the Civil War II storyline, Hawkeye starts traveling the country and focuses his efforts towards helping the underprivileged with community based problems in an effort to redeem his actions from the event, beginning with the water supply in Santa Rosa, New Mexico. He eventually gains the aid of Red Wolf of Earth-51920, who's the town deputy. They came across the company Oasis Spring Water that was pumping the underground water reservoir on the Sweet Medicine Indian Reservation. When Hawkeye and Red Wolf fight against the Oasis Spring Water's militia, they are attacked by Hydro-Man. As the unnamed boss of Oasis Spring Water interrogates them, Hawkeye and Red Wolf free themselves where Red Wolf defeated the militia. As Hawkeye fights Hydro-Man, the Fireheart cousins join the fight where Silas Fireheart uses electricity to defeat Hydro-Man. Afterwards, the two of them notified the authorities so that they can deal with Oasis Spring Water. A week later in Chicago, Hawkeye and Red Wolf team up with Nighthawk and Nightshade after finding barrels of epidurium, a synthetic skin used to build Life-Model Decoys, on a truck that was hijacked. They go to an abandoned coal factory where they end up being attacked by armed soldiers led by Nick Fury. It's later revealed, that Nick Fury, as well as Dum Dum Dugan, Gabe Jones and the other agents, are Life-Model Decoys due to their outdated knowledge and technology. They later thwart an attack by gunmen attempting to rob the base. After talking to Nick Fury Jr., Hawkeye and Red Wolf carry on with their mission, with Nightshade joining them.

They then stop at Dungston, Iowa when their van breaks down. Hawkeye calls Wheels Wolinski to fix the van until it is revealed that some of the residents are Skrulls, who are being hunted down by mysterious men. While Hawkeye, Red Wolf and Nightshade are fighting, Wolinski discovers that the van has an A.I. system, who convinces him to help in the fight. It is later revealed that the attackers are also Skrulls, led by Super-Skrull. Red Wolf hears from one of the Skrulls that a number of them escaped the empire to find and live a peaceful life and had been in hiding ever since. Wolinski then manages to turn the van into a big robot and defeats Super-Skrull. Hawkeye then negotiates with Nick Fury Jr. to provide protection for the town's residents.

During the Secret Empire storyline, Hawkeye joins the Underground resistance following Hydra's takeover in the United States, while the rest of team, along with the Fireheart cousins, gather their own resistance army to help the people in rural areas that are falling victim to Hydra's cruel treatment. It is also revealed that Nightshade became the new Nighthawk, after the former was killed by Hydra soldiers. While on the way to a secret bunker in South Dakota, the team is attacked by Hydra forces but they manage to survive. While arming themselves, the resistance prepares for battle until they are attacked by Hydra forces. During the battle, Red Wolf and Nightshade have an intimate moment which ends with Nightshade kissing Red Wolf, professing their mutual love. They then head out to help the resistance defeat Hydra.

== Collected editions ==
Title	Material collected	Published date	ISBN
Occupy Avengers Vol. 1: Taking Back Justice	Occupy Avengers #1-4, Avengers (vol. 1) #80-81	July 3, 2017	978-1302906382
Occupy Avengers Vol. 2: In Plain Sight	Occupy Avengers #5-9	October 10, 2017	978-1302906429
