= Aaron Kuder =

American comic book artist and writer

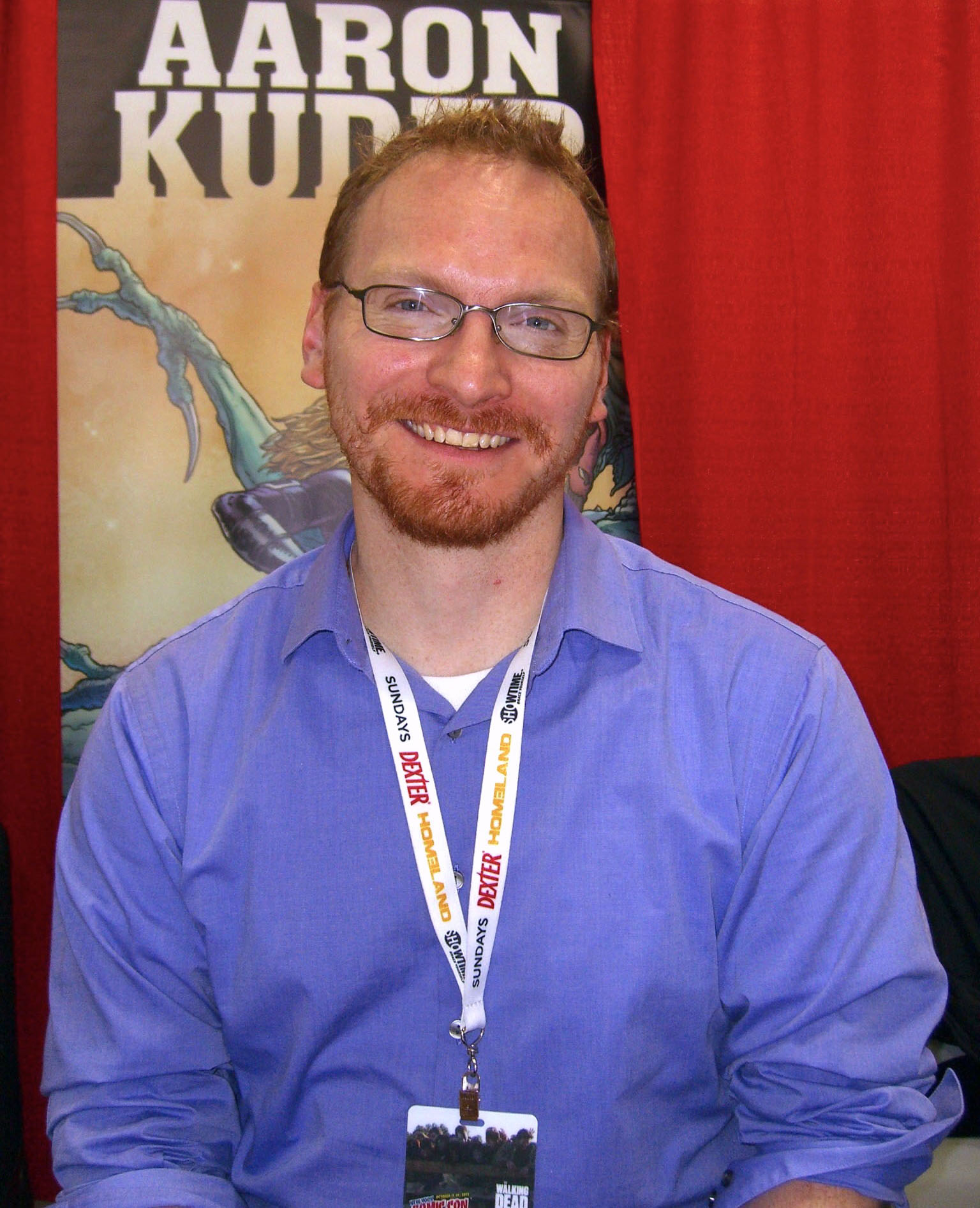
- Kuder at the 2012 New York Comic Con
- Born: 1977 or 1978 (age 48–49)
- Areas: Writer, Penciller, Inker
- Notable works: The Amory Wars: In Keeping Secrets of Silent Earth 3 Action Comics; Superboy

Aaron Kuder (born 1977 or 1978) is an American comic book artist and writer, who has worked on books such as The Amory Wars: In Keeping Secrets of Silent Earth 3, Legion Lost, Green Lantern: New Guardians, Avenging Spider-Man, Death of X, All-New Guardians of the Galaxy and Infinity Countdown.

== Career ==
Kuder began his career around 2000 on the Ten Ton Studios Forum, where he met Nick Pitarra, Reilly Brown, Chris Chua, Khoi Pham, and many other artists, including Chris Burnham, who later would offer him to finish The Amory Wars: In Keeping Secrets of Silent Earth 3, which Burnham had to leave because of his Batman Incorporated job.

After filling on various books published as part of DC Comics 2011 - 2015 The New 52 initiative, Kuder was announced as the new artist for Action Comics with writer Greg Pak, their run began in November 2013.

Kuder was also the artist for the Fantastic Four in association with writer Dan Slott, replacing Sara Pichelli.

Kuder was the artist for writer Ed Brisson on a new Ghost Rider series released in October 2019.

In May 2023, it was announced that Kuder would serve as the artist for volume 8 of Daredevil for writer Saladin Ahmed, which is set to release in September 2023.

== Influences ==
Kuder is heavily influenced by the work of Arthur Adams and Grzegorz Rosiński, and other artists who embody elements of European-style comics, such as Frank Quitely and Geoff Darrow.

== Bibliography ==
Interior comic work includes:

- Ten Ton Studios' Jam Comic #2: "page seven" (script and art, webcomic, Ten Ton Studios, 2010)
- The Amory Wars: In Keeping Secrets of Silent Earth 3 #8-12 (with Peter David and Claudio Sanchez, Boom! Studios, 2011)
- Key of Z #1-4 (with Claudio Sanchez and Chondra Echert, Boom! Studios, 2011–2012)
- Legion Lost vol. 2 #8: "Ravaged!" (with Tom DeFalco, DC Comics, 2012)
- Avenging Spider-Man #12-13 (with Kevin Shinick, Marvel, 2012)
- Green Lantern: New Guardians #0, 15-17 (with Tony Bedard and Andrei Bressan (#0), DC Comics, 2012–2013)
- Superman vol. 3 (DC Comics):
  - "Metropolitan Nightmare" (with Scott Lobdell, Tyler Kirkham and Robson Rocha, in #18, 2013)
  - "Wham!" (with Scott Lobdell, in #20, 2013)
  - "Parasite" (script and art, in #23.4, 2013)
- Action Comics vol. 2 (artist + co-writer with Greg Pak, DC Comics):
  - "Zero Year: Stormbreaker" (in #25, 2014)
  - "What Lies Beneath" (in #26-29, with Mike Hawthorne and R.B. Silva (#27), Jed Dougherty (#29), 2014)
  - "Superdoom" (in #30-35, with Jed Dougherty and Karl Kerschl (#30), Rafa Sandoval (#31), Scott Kolins (#32 and 34–35), 2014)
  - "Under the Skin" (in #36-40, with Jae Lee (#38), Scott Kolins (#39), 2015)
  - "Divergence" (in Convergence: Superboy #2, co-feature, 2015)
  - "Hard Truth" (in #41-44, with Howard Porter (#44), 2015)
  - "Blind Justice" (in #45-47, art by Scott Kolins (#45-46) and Georges Jeanty (#47), 2015–2016)
  - "Savage Dawn" (in #48-50, with Rafa Sandoval (#48), Ardian Syaf (#49) and various artists (#50), 2016)
- Superboy vol. 5 #30-34 (script, art by Jorge Jiménez, DC Comics, 2014)
- Green Lantern Corps: Edge of Oblivion #4: "Captive" (with Tom Taylor and Ardian Syaf, DC Comics, 2016)
- Death of X #1-4 (with Jeff Lemire, Charles Soule and Javier Garrón (#3-4), Marvel, 2016–2017)
- Guardians of the Galaxy (with Gerry Duggan, Marvel):
  - "Smash and Grab" (in FCBD 2017 one-shot, 2017)
  - All-New Guardians of the Galaxy #1-2, 4, 6, 10 (2017)
  - Guardians of the Galaxy #150 (with Marcus To, 2018)
- Infinity Countdown #1-5 (with Gerry Duggan, Mike Deodato Jr. and Mike Hawthorne, Marvel, 2018)
- Edge of Spider-Geddon #4 (script and art, with Will Robson, Marvel, 2018)
- Fantastic Four vol. 6 #5-9 (with Dan Slott and various artists (#7-9), Marvel, 2019)
- Ghost Rider vol. 7 #1-2, 4, 7 (with Ed Brisson, Marvel, 2019–2020)

=== Covers only ===
- Legion Lost vol. 2 #11-12 (DC Comics, 2012)
- Batman Incorporated vol. 2 #0 (DC Comics, 2012)
- Batman vol. 2 #13 (DC Comics, 2012)
- Marvel Universe vs. The Avengers #1-4 (Marvel, 2012)
- Green Lantern: New Guardians #14, 18-20 (DC Comics, 2013)
- Deathstroke vol. 2 #17-18 (DC Comics, 2013)
- Superman Unchained #3 (DC Comics, 2013)
- Superman vol. 3 #23.1, 44 (DC Comics, 2013–2015)
- Action Comics vol. 2 #23.1, 23.3, 23.4 (DC Comics, 2013)
- Justice League #23.2, 24-26 (DC Comics, 2013–2014)
- Superman/Wonder Woman #1, 21 (DC Comics, 2013–2015)
- Batman/Superman #24, Futures End #1 (DC Comics, 2014–2015)
- Lobo vol. 3 #1-3 (DC Comics, 2014–2015)
- The Multiversity: Mastermen #1 (DC Comics, 2015)
- Convergence #3 (DC Comics, 2015)
- X-Men '92 #6 (Marvel, 2016)
- The Amazing Spider-Man vol. 4 #19 (Marvel, 2016)
- Captain America: Steve Rogers #3-4 (Marvel, 2016)
- Civil War II: Kingpin #1-4 (Marvel, 2016)
- Civil War II: The Amazing Spider-Man #3 (Marvel, 2016)
- All-New Guardians of the Galaxy #3, 5, 7-9 (Marvel, 2017)
- Guardians of the Galaxy #146-149 (Marvel, 2017–2018)
- Infinity Countdown: Adam Warlock #1 (Marvel, 2018)
- The Amazing Spider-Man #799 (Marvel, 2018)
- The Avengers vol. 7 #1 (Marvel, 2018)
- Venom vol. 4 #1 (Marvel, 2018)
- Infinity Wars #1 (Marvel, 2018)
- Death of the Inhumans #3 (Marvel, 2018)
- Gunhawks #1 (Marvel, 2019)
- War of the Realms #4 (Marvel, 2019)
- The Amazing Spider-Man vol. 5 #22 (Marvel, 2019)
- Giant-Size X-Statix #1 (Marvel, 2019)
- Absolute Carnage #1 (Marvel, 2019)
- Deadpool vol. 5 Annual #1 (Marvel, 2019)
- Absolute Carnage: Symbiote of Vengeance #1 (Marvel, 2019)
- Marauders #1 (Marvel, 2019)
