= Secret Empire (2017 comic) =

2017 Marvel Comics limited series and crossover storyline

- Cover of Secret Empire #1 (May 2017); Art by Mark Brooks

Publication information
- Publisher: Marvel Comics
- Format: Limited series
- Publication date: April – August 2017
- Main character(s): Alpha Flight Space Program; Army of Evil; Avengers; Captain America; Captain America/Hydra Supreme; Champions; Defenders; Guardians of the Galaxy; Hydra; Inhumans; Invaders; Punisher; Sharon Carter; S.H.I.E.L.D. Ultimates; Ultron/Hank Pym; Uncanny Avengers; U.S.Avengers; X-Men

Creative team
- Written by: Nick Spencer
- Artist(s): Rod Reis; Daniel Acuña; Steve McNiven; Leinil Francis Yu; Andrea Sorrentino
- Letterer: Travis Lanham
- Editor(s): Axel Alonso; Tom Brevoort; Alanna Smith

"Secret Empire" is a 2017 Marvel Comics crossover storyline published by Marvel Comics, consisting of a 10-issue, eponymous miniseries written by Nick Spencer and illustrated by Rod Reis, Daniel Acuña, Steve McNiven, Leinil Francis Yu and Andrea Sorrentino, and numerous tie-in books. The storyline addresses the aftermath of the storyline "Avengers: Standoff!" and the ongoing series Captain America: Steve Rogers, in which Captain America has been revealed to be acting as a sleeper agent and covertly setting the stage to establish the terrorist organization Hydra as the main world power. The entire crossover received mixed reviews.

== Publication history ==
The initial groundwork for "Secret Empire" was laid in the 2016 miniseries Avengers: Standoff!, which had also been written by Nick Spencer. In that story, the being known as Kobik transformed the elderly, 90-year-old Steve Rogers back into the youthful and physically formidable superhuman he had previously been thanks to his receiving the Super Soldier Serum in World War II. These events were explored further in the ensuing ongoing series Captain America: Steve Rogers, in which the transformation is revealed to have been masterminded by Rogers' archenemy, the Red Skull, who altered Captain America's memories, making him an agent of the terrorist organization Hydra. This was part of the Red Skull's plan to bring the American government to its knees and enable Hydra to become a world-power. Throughout the rest of 2016 and the first half of 2017, subsequent issues of Captain America: Sam Wilson, Thunderbolts and Captain America: Steve Rogers, along with tie-in issues of Uncanny Avengers and U.S.Avengers and the storyline "Civil War II" unveiled how Captain America planned to alter the playing field covertly without the knowledge of his fellow superheroes.

One of the many posters that was released as a teaser for "Secret Empire"

In early 2017 Marvel began to release teaser posters in anticipation for the "Secret Empire"storyline. One month after the posters were released it was announced that the limited series would be sold twice monthly and would be a total of nine issues, including a prelude issue serving as #0, with issue #1 set to be released in May 2017 and issue #8 would end the limited series in August that same year. Editor-in-chief Axel Alonso went on to mention that one of the main purposes for the storyline was to unify the Marvel superheroes following the divisive events of the "Civil War II" and the "Inhumans vs X-Men" storylines, so that they could face a common foe. In March it was revealed that some of the members of the creative team included Steve McNiven (Monsters Unleashed), Nick Spencer (Captain America: Steve Rogers), Andrea Sorrentino (Old Man Logan), and Leinil Yu (Star Wars). In April it was announced that the conclusion of "Secret Empire" would be followed by an 18-month hiatus for Marvel from large crossover events, the company's longest consecutive gap without any such event in twelve years. Issue #0 was released on April 19, 2017 and the first issue was released on May 3.

== Premise ==
The storyline deals with Hydra's takeover of the United States after Captain America is revealed to be one of their agents due to the sentient Cosmic Cube Kobik altering his memories. This causes the rest of the superheroes to join forces and rebel against their former leader and friend to save the country from Hydra's control.

== Plot ==
Kobik, a sentient Cosmic Cube, rewrites reality, creating a new timeline where Captain America is a Hydra sleeper agent. This version of Rogers becomes the head of S.H.I.E.L.D. and is appointed head of Earth's defense forces during a Chitauri attack on Earth. As the shield around Earth is brought online, Rogers reveals his allegiance to Hydra as the Hydra Supreme. Meanwhile, all of Manhattan is imprisoned in Darkforce energy by Blackout. Iron Man sends a signal out to the other heroes to meet in Washington, D.C. as fast as they can.

Hacker Rayshaun Lucas is entrusted with key data by Rick Jones, which Rick states will prove the truth about Captain America. Rick and Sharon Carter are captured by Hydra, but refuse to swear loyalty to them. Hydra Supreme executes Rick and dispatches Helicarriers to raze Las Vegas. Hydra Supreme and Madame Hydra resume their search for the Cosmic Cube to undo the Allies' victory in World War II.

Having received and analyzed Rick's data, Iron Man determines that Cosmic Cube fragments have been scattered around the world and could return Rogers to his proper self if brought together. Black Widow sets off to kill Rogers herself, reasoning that, even if Rick's theory is true, Rogers would prefer to die than be used in this manner. Hydra's forces discover a Cosmic Cube shard in Atlantis, but learn that it is a decoy planted by Namor. Hydra Supreme places Namor in a position that forces him to give Hydra Supreme access to the Cosmic Cube fragment in Atlantis.

At the Hydra Helicarrier, it is revealed that Hydra has resurrected Bruce Banner, but do not expect him to live for long. As the Hulk, Banner attacks Hydra's fortress and collapses the roof over Iron Man and Hydra Supreme as Hydra's resurrection process wears off. On the Hydra Helicarrier, Madame Hydra detects an unusual amount of energy in the Mount and rushes in. Madame Hydra arrives and teleports Hydra Supreme away at the last second as Iron Man explodes, destroying the base and killing Madame Hydra.

The Red Skull tortures "Steve Rogers," claiming he is granting Rogers "peace." Spider-Man and Black Widow are about to proceed with their mission to assassinate Hydra Supreme. Punisher arrives right before Black Widow can take the shot and the two begin to fight. Black Widow fights her way through several Hydra guards, but is attacked and killed by an unknown assailant. Rogers then tackles the Red Skull and they both plummet off the cliff into the water below.

Maria Hill finds Blackout in prison and kills him, freeing Manhattan from the Darkforce dome. After emerging from the ocean with the remaining Cube fragment in his hand, Sam Wilson meets up with the other heroes at the Triskelion. As the Underground plans to spring into action, they know that the battle is still in Hydra's favor with Black Panther still a captive and Hydra Supreme having most of the Cosmic Cube fragments.

Hydra Supreme uses a version of Iron Man's armor to harness the Cosmic Cube. Meanwhile, Kobik learns that the original Steve Rogers still exists inside Kobik's mental world and restores his memories. Hydra Supreme absorbs the final Cube fragment into his armor, but is thwarted by Winter Soldier and Ant-Man. Rogers convinces Kobik to stand up and fight back, then escapes to the real world. Hydra Supreme is taken to a high-security prison known as Shadow Pillar, where he is the only inmate.

== Issues involved ==
=== Opening salvo ===
- Captain America: Steve Rogers #15
- Thunderbolts Vol. 3 #12
- U.S.Avengers #5

=== Main plot ===
- Free Comic Book Day 2017 (Secret Empire)
- Secret Empire Free Previews Spotlight #1
- Secret Empire #0–10

=== Tie-in issues ===
- All-New Guardians of the Galaxy Annual #1
- The Amazing Spider-Man Vol. 4 #29–31
- Avengers Vol. 7 #9-10
- Captain America #25
- Captain America: Sam Wilson #22–24
- Captain America: Steve Rogers #17–19
- Champions Vol. 2 #10-11
- Deadpool Vol. 6 #31–35
- Doctor Strange Vol. 4 #21–24
- Mighty Captain Marvel #5–8
- Not Brand Echh #14
- Occupy Avengers #8–9
- Secret Empire: Brave New World #1–5
- Secret Empire: Underground #1
- Secret Empire: United #1
- Secret Empire: Uprising #1
- Secret Warriors Vol. 2 (2017) #1–5
- U.S.Avengers #6–9
- Ultimates 2 Vol. 2 #7
- Uncanny Avengers Vol. 3 #24–25
- X-Men Blue #7–9
- X-Men Gold #7–8

=== Aftermath ===
- Secret Empire Omega #1
- Avengers Vol. 7 #11
- Champions Vol. 2 #12
- Deadpool Vol. 6 #36
- Secret Warriors Vol. 2 (2017) #6-7
- U.S.Avengers #10
- Tales of Suspense #100-104
- Uncanny Avengers Vol. 3 #26-27
- Black Bolt #8
- The Punisher Vol. 11 #218-228
- The Punisher Vol. 12 #1-16

== Reception ==
Core miniseries
- IGN
- Issue: Rating
0	8.9/10
1	8.6/10
2	8.3/10
3	7.4/10
4	6.5/10
5	8.3/10
6	6.7/10
7	7.8/10
8	8.2/10
9	5.3/10
10	5.1/10

Secret Empire #0 and #1 both received largely positive reviews. IGN rated Secret Empire #0 a score of 8.9 out of 10, calling it "great", with a verdict stating that "Secret Empire probably isn't going to be for all readers. If you haven't been won over by Captain America: Steve Rogers over the past year, Secret Empire #0 likely won't change your mind. But for those who can roll with the concept of Marvel's brightest hero becoming its greatest betrayer, this issue serves as a strong start to what promises to be a very epic and emotionally charged conflict." The review also praised the artwork on the book. James Whitbrook of io9 called it "Confusing," "gutwrenching," and "baffling," praising the dark tone of the story, saying "the sense of unease and despair that pervades Secret Empire #0 is phenomenal," and stating that "while Secret Empire's 0-issue nails the gut-wrenching feeling of inevitable doom, it's also perhaps tackling a little too much all at once" and noting that the series would likely be confusing for new readers.

IGN called Issue #1 "great", stating, "While the art in this issue isn't quite as consistent as it needs to be, in general Secret Empire is shaping up to be one of the rare crossover events that actually delivers on the hype. This opening chapter sets the stage well, establishing a drastically different Marvel Universe that's already feeling the influence of Hydra's reign. It offers a winning blend of character drama, superhero spectacle, and even significant humor to balance out the darker moments. If that balance can be maintained over the long haul, readers are in for a treat this summer." ComicsVerse also gave the first issue a positive review, praising Nick Spencer's writing, calling it "fearless" as well as praising Steve McNiven's artwork, saying, "the team behind this book took a huge chance and it paid off. Lovingly crafted and obviously a passion project, this issue was worth the wait." The Comics Beat stated of Issue #1, "Secret Empire delivers as Spencer and McNiven devote the time and attention to their craft to deliver on the absurd premise baked within this massive crossover."

IGN ranked Secret Empire #2 with a score of 8.3, and once again called it "great" with the verdict that "Secret Empire continues to impress in its second issue, with a story that's both epic and intimate."

IGN gave issue #3 a 7.4 score saying that "Secret Empire becomes a little too overstuffed in its third issue as more key players enter the stage".

Matthew Mueller of comicbook.com gave the fourth issue 4 out of 5 stars.

According to Comic Book Roundup, the entire crossover received an average score of 6.8 out of 10 based on 176 reviews.

=== Commercial performance ===
The series was a commercial success, with issues #0 and 1 being the third best-selling comic books of April and May, respectively.

== Controversy ==
One of the cover variants by Dan Mora featuring Magneto and Captain America as a Hydra agent were met with controversy by fans. The backlash was because Magneto, a Jewish Holocaust survivor with a hatred for Nazis, was in a lineup of villain covers featuring Hydra members, despite being a neutral party in the main storyline.

== Collected editions ==
Title	Material collected	Published date	ISBN
Secret Empire Prelude	Captain America (vol. 7) #21, 25, Captain America: Sam Wilson #7-8, Assault on Pleasant Hill Alpha, Assault on Pleasant Hill Omega; Captain America: Steve Rogers #1-2	May 2017	978-1302907174
Secret Empire	Secret Empire #0-10, Secret Empire Omega #1, Caption America #25, material from Free Comic Book Day 2017 (Secret Empire)	July 2018	978-0785194521
Secret Empire: United We Stand	Secret Empire: United #1, Secret Empire: Underground #1, Secret Empire: Uprising #1, Uncanny Avengers (vol. 3) #24-25, All New Guardians of the Galaxy Annual #1	October 2017	978-1302908553
Secret Empire: Brave New World	Secret Empire: Brave New World #1-5	December 2017	978-1302907587
Captain America: Secret Empire	Captain America: Steve Rogers #17-19, Captain America: Sam Wilson #22-24	October 2017	978-1302908492
Avengers: Unleashed Vol. 2 - Secret Empire	Avengers (vol. 7) #7-11	November 2017	978-1302906122
Amazing Spider-Man Worldwide Vol. 7: Secret Empire	Amazing Spider-Man (vol. 4) #29-32, Amazing Spider-Man (vol. 1) #789-791	January 2018	978-1846538667
Deadpool: World's Greatest Vol. 10 - Secret Empire	Deadpool (vol. 6) #31-35	November 2017	978-1302907617
Doctor Strange Vol. 5: Secret Empire	Doctor Strange (vol. 4) #21-26	January 2018	978-1302905897
Secret Warriors Vol. 1: Secret Empire	Secret Warriors (vol. 2) #1-5	October 2017	978-1302906924

== Adaptations ==
The fourth season of the Marvel Cinematic Universe (MCU) television series Agents of S.H.I.E.L.D. aired concurrently with the early issues of Secret Empire and featured the "Agents of Hydra" story arc that shared many similarities with it. Both depict an American society being successfully taken over by Hydra after a heroic character was made to believe his allegiance was to Hydra his whole life due to a reality-altering device. Both storylines also feature lines that could be interpreted as references to then-current American politics as well as exploration of the lives of everyday citizens under the fascist regime. Although Agents of S.H.I.E.L.D. focused on a different cast of characters, the similarities between two storylines were noted by several reviewers. Additionally, Secret Empire #1 made reference to the Malick Corporation, named after the character Gideon Malick from Agents of S.H.I.E.L.D..

Wilson Fisk being elected as Mayor of New York over the epilogue of "Secret Empire" was adapted to MCU from 2024 to 2026, firstly with Fisk (portrayed by Vincent D’Onofrio) deciding to run for office in the mid-credits scene of the Disney+ miniseries Echo, and subsequently with Fisk being elected in the first episode of the television series Daredevil: Born Again, with the first two seasons of the series then proceeding to also loosely adapt "Devil's Reign".
