= Death of X =

2016 comic book miniseries

- Cover to Death of X #1, art by Aaron Kuder

Publication information
- Publisher: Marvel Comics
- Genre: Superhero; Crossover
- Publication date: October – November 2016
- Main character(s): X-Men: Alchemy; All New X-Men; Cyclops; Emma Frost; Magik; Magneto; Stepford Cuckoos; Storm; Inhumans: Black Bolt; Crystal; Gorgon; Iso; Medusa

Creative team
- Written by: Jeff Lemire; Charles Soule
- Artist: Aaron Kuder
- Penciller(s): Javier Garron; Aaron Kuder
- Inker(s): Javier Garron; Scott Hanna; Aaron Kuder; Jay Leisten; Cam Smith
- Letterer: Joe Sabina
- Colorist(s): Andrew Crossley; Jason Keith; Morry Hollowell; Matt Milla; Wil Quintana; Jay David Ramos
- Editor(s): Daniel Ketchum; Nick Lowe; Wil Moss; Mark Paniccia

Death of X is a 2016 crossover miniseries published by Marvel Comics. Death of X is part of a series of story arcs that have impacted the Inhumans and X-Men titles after Secret Wars ended and Earth 616 was restored along with being related to the events of the Infinity, Inhumanity, and Inhuman story arcs. This miniseries event answers the question about what really happened between Cyclops and the Inhumans in the eight-month gap between Secret Wars and the All New, All Different lineup of comics. This limited series event serves as a prequel to the series Uncanny Inhumans, Extraordinary X-Men, and Volume 4 of Uncanny X-Men, along with impacting the plot to Civil War II: X-Men and ultimately serving as a precursor to lead into the major crossover event Inhumans vs. X-Men.

== Publication history ==
Death of X was a limited series event that was first announced by Marvel in early spring 2016. To help build anticipation for the limited series, in May 2016 Marvel announced the release of variant covers for other titles that would relate to the upcoming limited series depicting various X-Men facing potentially fatal situations. Also to help promote it, Marvel announced the release of a digital comic called Inhumans vs. X-Men: Terrigenocide as a tie-in to their mobile game Marvel Contest of Champions. X-Men writer Jeff Lemire and Inhumans writer Charles Soule were set to co-write with Aaron Kuder on art. In July 2016 the authors were interviewed about how this limited series event would impact it will have on future issues of X-Men and Inhumans titles. That same month, Entertainment Weekly released an article detailing how Death of X was going to finally reveal what happened in the eight-month gap between Secret Wars and the All New, All Different Marvel lineup.

Everyone at Marvel remained tight-lipped as to the meaning of the title, with many fans speculating that it meant Marvel was going to use this event to officially kill off the X-Men and replace them with the Inhumans due to rumors of movie rights disputes between Marvel Studios and 20th Century Fox. This theory became even more popular due to the increased popularity for Inhuman characters after many were introduced on Agents of S.H.I.E.L.D. as well as the fact Marvel increased their Inhuman presence in their comics ever since the Infinity and Inhumanity story arcs.

Death of X serves as a prequel to the X-Men and Inhuman titles part of the All New, All Different lineup. All of the titles that were part of the All New, All Different lineup of comics were set eight months after Earth 616 was reset with mutants and Inhumans in a state of cold war and Cyclops missing and many Inhumans and X-Men blaming him for the current status-quo taking place within their respective titles. Once Inhumans vs. X-Men was announced Death of X was written to serve as both a prequel for the current titles as well as a lead-in for Inhumans vs. X-Men, which was released shortly after the conclusion of Death of X. The miniseries was released on October 5, 2016 and was sold semi-monthly, ending in November that same year.

== Plot synopsis ==
Cyclops and his team of X-Men land on Muir Island in response to a distress call sent by Jamie Madrox. When they arrive on the island, they find it engulfed in a mysterious gas that they eventually discover is Terrigen Mist. Upon further exploration, they find all of the mutants on Muir Island suffered painful deaths due to the Terrigen Mist poisoning their systems, including Madrox and all of his duplicates. Goldballs begins to display signs of infection from exposure to the Terrigen. Meanwhile, Crystal leads a team of Inhumans to Japan, where one of the Terrigen clouds is about to land and anyone who has latent Inhuman DNA would undergo Terrigenesis. While a few people start to undergo the metamorphosis, a Hydra strike team ambushes everyone, intent on destroying the Inhumans. Crystal and her team try to hold back Hydra and eventually one of the new Inhumans fresh from his metamorphosis named Daisuke helps them defeat the Hydra squad. Cyclops and Emma Frost confer with Beast that the Terrigen really is becoming toxic to mutants. Cyclops immediately blames the Inhumans for carelessly putting their own people ahead of the well-being of mutants.

Storm holds an emergency meeting with Medusa to discuss this new development and how to move forward. They agree to work together to track the Terrigen cloud and evacuate any mutants who are in its way while the Inhumans assist Beast in working out why the Terrigen is becoming toxic to mutants and how to stop it. They agree to keep the nature of the Terrigen quiet in hopes of avoiding a panicked incident. After the meeting ends, Medusa makes plans for war in case any mutants become hostile towards the Inhumans in light of this new situation. With the help of Emma Frost and the Stepford Cuckoos, Cyclops delivers a telepathic message to the entire world about the truth of Terrigen, vocally blaming the Inhumans for favoring their own whilst leaving the mutants to die. While broadcasting the message, Irma sees something in Frost's mind that Frost demands be kept quiet. Cyclops' broadcast leads to mass hysteria in Madrid where the Terrigen Cloud is heading. Magik demands a meeting with Cyclops, but he and Frost brush her aside and make new plans in private. While Cyclops' X-Men bury the mutants killed on Muir Island, Storm meets with Crystal and they combine their powers to push the Terrigen cloud away from the populace. Even with the cloud going in a new direction away from Madrid, the riot continues to grow. Crystal orders Daisuke to use his powers to make everyone fall asleep to end the riot. He does so, but it also makes Storm and her team of X-Men fall asleep. Frost converses with Magneto to make new plans on how to end the threat of Terrigen, claiming that mutants and Inhumans cannot successfully coexist.

Magneto and Frost find out that the Inhumans in Madrid put everyone to sleep, including the X-Men, making them both see this as an act of war. Frost sends Magneto to Madrid to keep the Inhumans distracted while she and Cyclops enact their plan. The Stepford Cuckoos go to Yorkshire, England and recruit Alchemy to their cause. Back in Madrid, the X-Men and civilians wake up initially thinking that they were knocked out because they failed and the Terrigen got them, but they quickly realize that they were only knocked out because of Daisuke. Assuming this is an act of aggression, Storm and her X-Men confront Crystal and her team. Storm attempts to hear out Crystal for why it happened, but the rest of the X-Men become agitated and when both sides are about to start fighting, Magik teleports in and captures Daisuke. Magneto then arrives with his own squad of X-Men and corrals everyone where they stand. Cyclops and his team of X-Men with Alchemy in tow arrive southwest of Madrid and see the Terrigen approaching. Cyclops explains his plan for Alchemy to use his powers to change the composition of the cloud.

Storm and Crystal quickly realize that Magneto is trying to distract them while Cyclops and his team attack the Terrigen cloud. Crystal immediately alerts Medusa and the rest of the Royal Family of the situation. The Royal Family arrives in hopes of reaching a diplomatic solution with Cyclops without any bloodshed in order to avoid an official declaration of war, but Cyclops has his team attack the royals so Sunfire can fly Alchemy to the Terrigen Cloud uninterrupted. While the Inhuman Royal Family battle Emma Frost, the Cuckoos, and Magik, Sunfire gets Alchemy to the cloud where he completely changes the nature of it, making it harmless for mutants and unusable for Inhumans. However, Alchemy is exposed to Terrigen in the process and dies. Cyclops meets Medusa and Black Bolt in the center of the cloud, where Medusa tries to get Cyclops to see how he just declared war against the Inhumans and needs to stand down before things escalate further. Outside of the cloud, Magik notices Frost starting to strain. Cyclops refuses to stand down and instead acts like he coerces Black Bolt into fatally attacking him, effectively committing suicide just as Crystal's Inhumans and Storm's X-Men finally arrive and bear witness. Storm manages to convince the Inhumans that both sides want peace despite what Cyclops did, so they agree to leave each other alone whilst simultaneously working on figuring out a means of fixing the Terrigen situation that would benefit everyone. Back at Muir Island, the X-Men all gather together to mourn Cyclops. Havok takes Frost aside, doubting Cyclops really died by Black Bolt's hand. Frost reveals to Havok that Cyclops died from Terrigen exposure shortly after they found Madrox, meaning that the Cyclops who has been interacting with everybody ever since was only a telepathic illusion projected into everyone's minds by Frost. She explains to Havok that she did not want him to die in vain, she wanted him to die as an idea to unify the mutants under a common goal.

== Aftermath ==
Tensions remained high between the Inhumans and X-Men that served as an underlying story arc for both Inhuman and X-Men titles. As a direct result of Emma Frost's actions, the world, already in more favor with the Inhumans than the X-Men, began to see mutants as even more of a threat and a danger than ever before.

=== Uncanny Inhumans ===
The Inhumans continue to gain favor in the public eye for their heroics as more NuHumans continue to appear worldwide. Beast went to live with the Inhumans so he can work alongside them peacefully to find a way to alter the state of the Terrigen cloud in hopes of making it harmless for mutants whilst maintaining its use for Inhumans. He works closely with Iso to discover a solution that benefits everyone while Medusa becomes increasingly worried of the notion that official full-on war with the X-Men may become inevitable. Beast ends up becoming a trusted ally of the Inhumans and is also invited to join as a member of their war council when Kang tries to alter Inhuman history.

=== Extraordinary X-Men ===
With the help of Doctor Strange, Magik, and Scarlet Witch, Storm has the Jean Grey School of Higher Learning transported into Limbo to protect any wayward mutants from the Terrigen cloud. After recruiting Colossus, Nightcrawler, Old Man Logan, and the time-displaced Jean Grey she sets out to find any and all mutants who have been infected by the cloud to Limbo where they will be safe from humans. Storm also uses this as an opportunity to attempt to fix the damage done by "Cyclops" and declare the X-Men as heroes for mutants, humans, and Inhumans alike despite what the increasingly bigoted and violent public believes.

=== Uncanny X-Men Volume 4 ===
Magneto took on a more militaristic approach than Storm and recruited his own team of X-Men consisting of Psylocke, Sabretooth, M, Mystique, Fantomex, and Archangel to protect mutants from their increasing number of enemies by any means necessary. They mainly spent their time looking into human-run organizations that saw mutants as easy targets due to their potential near-extinction while also fighting against other mutants who Magneto deemed as working against the mutant cause. However, high tensions and secrecy amongst the team constantly threatens to break them up. Unlike Storm's team of X-Men, Magneto's team did not care about being seen as heroes for everybody including humans and Inhumans; Magneto's main objective was to help revive the mutant species whilst shunning humans and Inhumans alike.

=== Inhumans vs. X-Men ===
Beast and Iso continue to work hard at discovering a cure for the infected mutants for the cloud, but soon discover that in a matter of weeks the cloud will render earth completely inhospitable for all mutants. This provides Beast with only two outcomes: mutants need to leave the planet and start fresh elsewhere, or stay behind and keep trying to find a cure at the risk of extinction. Meanwhile, Emma Frost and the Stepford Cuckoos do not join any of the X-Men teams and she becomes so traumatized by Cyclops' death that she starts believing her own lie that Black Bolt killed him, causing her to train herself for battle against the Inhumans and she develops a plan to fight the Inhumans and destroy the cloud on mutant terms instead of waiting for Beast and Iso. While legitimately wanting to avoid a war against the X-Men, Medusa begins to make preparations for the inevitable fact that war may soon be coming. Not wanting to be forced to leave the planet, the X-Men declare war against the Inhumans, with both sides fighting for their right to thrive as a species. Frost in particular displays increasingly harsh and aggressive tactics towards the Inhumans.

== Critical reception ==
Death of X received mixed to positive reviews from critics, with most critics lauding the art done by Aaron Kuder and battle scenes. A review done by Nerdist gave the first issue of Death of X 2/5, feeling like the conflict was rushed and the Inhumans were written blandly, causing the story and the readers to be biased. Justin Partridge at Newsarama was more critical of the first issue feeling like the creative team who usually produces top-notch work dropped the ball on this story, specifically feeling like the art was dull and the writing slow. Patridge also went on to view the first issue as insensitive due to the X-Men's history for being allegorical towards minority struggles and felt like seeing the mutants being infected and killed off as they were was a poorly-chosen allegory for the AIDS virus spreading in the homosexual community, overall giving the first issue a "disappointing" rating of 4/10. IGN gave issue #2 a score of 7.5, a good standing, stating that it "features great art and a welcome dose of Cyclops, but the series lacks any real wow factor" along with praising the writers for representing all sides equally. IGN also felt as a whole Death of X works well as the prequel it is intended to be but also suffers for readers already knowing how it is supposed to end. IGN then went on to review issue #3 but gave it a lower score of 6.1, an o.k. standing; the feeling was that the miniseries was limited due to the fact that it takes place before current titles and while it has good moments, it fails to set the stage for the finale. Aaron Long at Comicosity felt differently about issue #3, going on to say that it was stronger than the two issues before it, and after reading it he was excited to see how it would set the stage for Inhumans vs. X-Men and gave it a score of 8.

Newsarama gave the fourth and final issue a score of 6/10, feeling like while the story did what it was supposed to do, the writers focused too much on Cyclops and thus alienated other aspects of the story that could have been fleshed out. They felt that the overall story while compelling was undermined due to the fact that readers already knew how it was going to end. Jack Fisher at Popmatters gave the 4th issue 4 out of 10 stars, feeling as though the story was incomplete and stating, "This may be okay for a movie trailer, but for a complete story that kills off one of the most iconic X-men in history, it's not even close to being enough." As a whole series, Eric Joseph gave Death of X 4.5 stars out of 5, giving it a good standing stating that "Death of X is the very definition of a crossover spectacle, but certain aspects may prove to be highly disorienting for those not caught up on certain developments in recent years" and then going on to describe it as a "highly satisfying precursor to Inhumans vs. X-Men and should be considered as required reading". Michael Cheang gave the series a score of 6/10 due to considering the scenes with the X-Men more captivating than the Inhumans and going as far as to describe Crystal's leadership as bland in comparison to Storm's. He then continues on to say that the series spends a lot of time muddling through some scenes without getting a full sense of enmity between the X-Men and Inhumans.
