= Black Bolt =

Marvel Comics fictional character

- Black Bolt taken from the cover of War of Kings #4 (June 2009). Art by Brandon Peterson.

Publication information
- Publisher: Marvel Comics
- First appearance: Fantastic Four #45 (December 1965)
- Created by: Stan Lee (writer); Jack Kirby (artist)

In-story information
- Alter ego: Blackagar Boltagon
- Species: Inhuman
- Place of origin: Attilan
- Team affiliations: Inhuman Royal Family; Illuminati
- Abilities: Superior Inhuman physiology granting: Superhuman strength, speed, stamina, durability, agility, and reflexes; Destructive hypersonic voice; Particle manipulation; Telepathic immunity; Limited telepathy; Flight

Black Bolt (Blackagar Boltagon) is a fictional character appearing in American comic books published by Marvel Comics. Created by Stan Lee and Jack Kirby, the character first appeared in Fantastic Four #45 (December 1965). Black Bolt is the ruler of Attilan, and a member of the Inhumans, a reclusive race of genetically altered superhumans. Black Bolt's signature power is his voice, as his electron-harnessing ability is linked to the speech center of his brain. Speaking triggers a massive disturbance in the form of a highly destructive shockwave capable of leveling a city. Due to the extreme danger posed by this power, the character has undergone rigorous mental training to prevent himself from uttering a sound, even in his sleep, and he usually remains completely silent and speaks through sign language or via a spokesperson.

Black Bolt has been described as one of Marvel's most notable and powerful male heroes. Since his original introduction in comics, the character has been featured in various other Marvel-licensed products, including video games, animated television series, and merchandise. In the Marvel Cinematic Universe, different versions of Black Bolt were portrayed by Anson Mount in the Marvel Television series Inhumans (2017) and the film Doctor Strange in the Multiverse of Madness (2022).

== Publication history ==
Black Bolt debuted in Fantastic Four #45 (December 1965), created by Stan Lee and Jack Kirby. He re-joined the Illuminati as part of the 2012 Marvel NOW! rebranding initiative. He appeared in the 2017 Black Bolt series, his first solo comic book series, by Saladin Ahmed and Christian James Ward. He appeared in the 2021 Darkhold: Black Bolt #1 one-shot.

== Fictional character biography ==
=== 1960s ===
Black Bolt's first appearance established the character as being a member of the Inhuman ruling class. The title Thor featured a back-up feature called "Tales of the Inhumans", which recounts Black Bolt's origin story. The son of King Agon and Queen Rynda, Black Bolt is exposed to the mutagenic Terrigen Mist while still an embryo, and eventually demonstrates the ability to manipulate electrons. To protect the Inhuman community from his devastating voice, Black Bolt is placed inside a sound-proof chamber and is tutored in the use of his powers. Reentering Inhuman society as a young man—having vowed never to speak—Black Bolt is attacked by his younger brother Maximus, who attempts, unsuccessfully, to goad him into speaking.

Black Bolt proved popular, and decides to leave Attilan to explore the outside world. Black Bolt reappears in a story focusing on his cousin Medusa, drives off the Hulk after he defeats the entire Inhuman Royal Family (Medusa, Gorgon, Karnak, Triton, and Crystal), and with the Fantastic Four, battles his brother Maximus and his own group of rogue Inhumans.

=== 1970s ===
After being forced to intercede in the budding romance between his cousin Crystal and the Fantastic Four's Johnny Storm, Black Bolt and the Inhumans feature in the title Amazing Adventures, and battle villains such as the Mandarin and Magneto. A story in The Avengers, told in flashback, reveals how Black Bolt came to be ruler of the Inhumans and Maximus was driven mad. Black Bolt discovered his brother had secretly allied himself with the alien Kree—the race whose genetic experiments first created the Inhumans. In trying to stop an escaping Kree vessel, he overextended his sonic powers and caused the vessel to crash. The crash resulted in the deaths of several members of the Council of Genetics, including his parents, and Maximus was driven insane by his proximity to Black Bolt's use of his voice. Black Bolt becomes king, but is haunted by the consequences of his actions.

Black Bolt settles a quarrel between Johnny Storm and the mutant Quicksilver for the affections of Crystal, and frees the slave caste of Inhuman society, the Alpha Primitives. Black Bolt and the Royal Family aid the hero Spider-Man against the time-traveling villain Kang the Conqueror, and is forced to again battle the Hulk, teams with the Fantastic Four and the Avengers against the threat of the robot Ultron, and again allies with the Fantastic Four against the fifth-dimensional villain Xemu.

Black Bolt and the Inhumans feature in a self-titled bi-monthly series battling threats such as the villain Blastaar and the Kree, who regard the Inhumans as abominations. Black Bolt encounters the immortal villain the Sphinx—who has defeated the Fantastic Four and the Royal Family blasting him into deep space, aids Kree hero Captain Marvel in preventing a war between the Kree and Skrulls on Earth, joins with Fantastic Four member the Thing to defeat the villain Graviton, and appears briefly during an announcement that Crystal is pregnant with Quicksilver's child.

=== 1980s ===
Black Bolt revisits his origins when he, members of the Royal Family, and Fantastic Four members Mister Fantastic and the Thing battle the villain Maelstrom. Maelstrom is revealed to be the son of a rival of Black Bolt's father, and—after his minions are defeated—attempts to destroy Attilan with a guided missile. Black Bolt, however, manages to defuse the missile and Maelstrom is defeated.

Black Bolt's search for a new site for the city of Attilan (eventually the Himalayas) is detailed in a back-up feature of the alternate universe title What If?. Another back-up feature in What If? details how Black Bolt worked with the Eternals to move the city of Attilan to the Himalayas. Black Bolt also directed the eventual move of Attilan to the Moon when the pollution on Earth became too much for the Inhumans.

He is rated with other powerful Marvel characters by Spider-Man in an "out of universe" conversation with the reader. He appears in a graphic novel detailing the eventual death of former ally Mar-Vell due to cancer. He also appears in a one-shot publication featuring humorous parodies of the Marvel Universe - Fantastic Four Roast, and aids superheroine Dazzler against the villain Absorbing Man.

An alien device abandoned on the moon causes Black Bolt, the Royal Family, and the Fantastic Four to experience nightmares until destroyed by Triton. Black Bolt is imprisoned by Maximus (who has also swapped their bodies), but he is freed by the Royal Family and the Avengers. He appears in a one-shot title detailing several of Marvel's continuity mistakes. He marries his cousin Medusa after an interrupting battle between a Kree and Skrull soldier. He appears in another What If? issue and a back-up tale in Marvel Fanfare.

With the Royal Family, Black Bolt encounters Dazzler once again, appears in flashbacks in two issues of The Avengers, attempts to subdue an erratic Quicksilver (distraught over his wife's affair), and aids the mutant team X-Factor in defeating Maximus. The Inhumans then assist the Fantastic Four against the villain Diablo, skirmish with a later version of the team during The Evolutionary War. They also appear in the first issue of What If?'s second volume.

Black Bolt clashes with Attilan's Genetic Council when they forbid the birth of the child he conceived with Medusa. She ends up fleeing to Earth to bear her son (Ahura). Black Bolt destroys the alien symbiote that Spider-Man bonds with in another issue of What If?, and with the Royal Family encounters the hero Daredevil.

=== 1990s ===
After another appearance in a back-up feature in the title What If? a story told in flashback reveals how Maximus, using a creation called the Trikon, forced Black Bolt from Attilan. Black Bolt, however, eventually defeats the Trikon and regains the throne. After aiding the teen super group the New Warriors, the Royal Family joins forces with X-Factor to stop master villain Apocalypse.

Black Bolt makes a series of brief guest appearances in several titles and his child is threatened by rogue Inhumans. He and the Royal family break away from Attilan after rescuing his son from the corrupted Genetics Council. After two more appearances in back-up features in the titles X-Factor and Starblast, Black Bolt appears in several panels in two titles before starring in the one-shot publication Inhumans: The Great Refuge (May 1995), which details the Inhumans' ongoing battle with the Kree.

With the Royal Family, the Fantastic Four, and Doom's heir Kristoff Vernard, Black Bolt thwarts Morgan le Fay and Maximus again, battling Thor and Sub-Mariner in the process. He appears with the Fantastic Four during the Onslaught crisis. After appearing in the one-shot title Bug, Black Bolt and the Inhumans feature in the Heroes Reborn universe, where they worship the entity Galactus and his Heralds, as gods.

Black Bolt encounters the noble savage Ka-Zar and witnesses Quicksilver reunite with Crystal before he and the Royal Family appear in a back-up feature in the Fantastic Four title. Black Bolt and the Inhumans then feature in a self-titled limited series which deals with the "coming of age" of a new group of Inhumans and stopping Maximus, who with both human and Inhuman allies attempts to subvert his brother's rule. After an appearance in the final issue of a Quicksilver limited series Black Bolt and the Inhumans team with Canadian superteam Alpha Flight.

=== 2000s ===
Black Bolt is featured—again with the Royal Family—in a third self-titled limited series that has major developments for the Inhumans. Ronan the Accuser leads the Kree in a surprise attack, capturing Attilan and forcing the Royal Family into service against Kree enemies the Shi'ar. Karnak, Gorgon, and Triton covertly join the Shi'ar Imperial Guard while Black Bolt and Medusa must attempt the assassination of the Shi'ar ruler Lilandra Neramani at a ceremony ratifying an alliance between the Shi'ar and the Spartoi. Although the attempt fails and Black Bolt manages to defeat Ronan in personal combat, the Inhuman people choose to leave with the Kree and pursue a new future. This leaves Black Bolt and the Royal Family alone to fend for themselves.

Interdimensional adventurers the Exiles also encounter an alternate universe version of Black Bolt. Black Bolt decides to attempt reintegration with Earth, and several younger Inhumans—recently exposed to Terrigen Mist—explore Earth with mixed results, including at one stage the intervention of the Fantastic Four. The Inhumans resettle in the Blue Area of the Moon and begin to rebuild. Black Bolt also appears briefly in the mutant title X-Statix and a one-shot title, Inhumans 2099, speculates on the future of the Inhumans and their role on Earth.

In the title New Avengers, Black Bolt is revealed to be a member of a superhero council called the Illuminati, which was formed during the Kree–Skrull War to deal with threats to Earth. During the "Son of M" storyline, Quicksilver steals a canister of Terrigen crystals from Attilan, with Black Bolt and the rest of the Royal Family attempting to retrieve it.

Black Bolt also rejects the Superhuman Registration Act and refuses to become involved in the ensuing "Civil War." Courtesy of the hero Sentry, Black Bolt monitors the situation. In the limited series Silent War, the US military attacks the Inhumans to prevent them from retrieving the crystals. Believing the stolen crystals should be returned to Attilan, Black Bolt issues a warning to the United States concerning further acts of aggression, and eventually launches an offensive against the nation. Gorgon and other Inhumans are captured during the attack, which prompts Black Bolt to personally head a team to rescue his subjects and retrieve the crystals. While the mission is successful, Maximus takes advantage of the situation and overthrows and temporarily incarcerates Black Bolt.

The Illuminati also collect the Infinity Gems, and—to prevent the abuse of power by the Titan Thanos and others—split the gems between themselves, vowing that they never be used in unison again. Black Bolt is given the "Reality" gem.

Black Bolt apparently suffers a setback when brutally beaten by the Hulk, on a rampage during the "World War Hulk" storyline and seeking revenge on Black Bolt for his role in the Hulk's exile from Earth. During the events of the Secret Invasion limited series it is revealed that this was not in fact Black Bolt, but rather a Skrull, who is killed in battle by members of the Illuminati. The true Black Bolt is captured by the Skrulls, who intended to use his voice as a weapon of mass destruction. Black Bolt is rescued when the heroes of Earth defeat the Skrull army and discover the location of their captured teammates.

Black Bolt, angered by the repercussions caused by the Skrull invasion, changes tactics and embarks on an aggressive campaign against all former persecutors of the Inhumans in the War of Kings limited series. At his command, the Inhumans attack the Kree and overthrow Ronan the Accuser, with Black Bolt declaring himself supreme ruler of the Kree Empire. This is followed by a preemptive strike from the Shi'ar empire, now controlled by the usurper Vulcan. Black Bolt intended to release the Terrigen Mist across the galaxy and end the war when, courtesy of the subsequent mutations, all are rendered equal, but the plan was interrupted by Vulcan, the two clashing as the bomb charged up. Although Vulcan was nearly killed by Black Bolt's voice, Black Bolt prepared to abandon his plan when Crystal pointed out that the powers produced by the explosion would only inspire more harm rather than good. However, an enraged Vulcan retained enough strength to stop Black Bolt from teleporting away with Crystal and Lockjaw, which resulted in Black Bolt and Vulcan apparently dying in the subsequent explosion of the Terrigen bomb, as Crystal only negated the Terrigen Mists within the bomb without shutting down its ability to explode.

=== 2010s ===
He in fact survived the explosion. It was revealed that Black Bolt likely represents the anomaly of the Kree Inhuman genetics program that had been predicted hundreds of thousands of years ago. The genetic prophecy was that this anomaly would bring about the end of the Supreme Intelligence. To prevent this outcome, the Kree Supreme Intelligence had ordered the destruction of all the worlds where the genetic experiments took place. Only five colonies escaped, including Earth's: these were the Universal Inhumans. After his return to Attilan, Black Bolt joined the Universal Inhumans and was presented with four new brides, one from each of the other colonies.

They returned to Earth to help defeat the last four Reeds of the Interdimensional Council. They then faced the Kree Armada, who had been ordered by the resurrected Kree Supreme Intelligence to wipe out Earth and the Inhumans. After the Kree fled in defeat, the Inhumans followed in pursuit. Guided by Franklin Richards, Black Bolt confronted the Supreme Intelligence, surviving long enough to surrender and trigger protocols forcing terms of a truce. He convinced them that the prophecy has been broken, and that he was no longer a threat. They parted ways, but Black Bolt had to agree to Ronan (Crystal's husband) returning alone to the Kree domain.

During the Infinity storyline, Black Bolt was visited by Thanos' Black Order to demand a tribute, the heads of Inhuman younglings between the ages of 16 and 22 or the annihilation of Earth's inhabitants. Using the Terrigen Codex, Black Bolt discovered Thanos used the tribute demand as a cover for his true mission: to kill his secret Inhuman-descendant son whose identity and location were unknown even by his father. After the Inhumans denied the tribute to Corvus Glaive, Thanos personally visited Black Bolt in Attilan. Finding the Inhuman city empty with only Black Bolt left, Black Bolt unleashed a powerful scream which tore down Attilan itself and activated a Terrigen Bomb which spread the Mists across the Earth. Thanos survived the attack and found Black Bolt still alive in the rubble. Thanos demanded to know the location of his son. Black Bolt refused and continued attacking Thanos with his voice until an enraged Thanos knocked him out. Black Bolt was held captive for Thanos to use his power to activate the Illuminati's anti-matter bombs to destroy the Earth. When the Illuminati arrived in the Necropolis, they found Thanos' general Supergiant, with Black Bolt under her control as she uses Black Bolt to defeat them. When Supergiant activated the bombs, Maximus appeared with the trigger. He triggered the bombs, but also used Lockjaw to transport the anti-matter bomb along with Supergiant to a distant uninhabited planet where she died in the explosion. Black Bolt was liberated and left the scene along with Maximus and Lockjaw. In the ancient location of Attilan in the Himalayas, Black Bolt hid the Terrigen Codex and made Maximus understand his survival and that of his brother were to be kept a secret. Maximus also deduced that Black Bolt was always going to activate the Terrigen Bomb irrespective of Thanos' arrival which was to herald a new age of the Inhumans. After being examined by Maximus, Black Bolt discovered with his brother that the Terrigen Bomb had greatly diminished Black Bolt's powers. Black Bolt and Maximus agreed to keep this a secret.

Using exogenetically charged waters, Maximus was able to help Black Bolt recover from the power loss he suffered after the detonation of the Terrigen Bomb.

During the "Secret Wars" storyline, Black Bolt takes part in the incursion between Earth-616 and Earth-1610. He is taken out by the Children of Tomorrow.

In the aftermath of the Secret Wars storyline, Medusa sends Nur and Auran to find Black Bolt who is forced by Maximus to use his voice against them, killing Auran. Black Bolt and Medusa end up separating over his prolonged absence from Attilan. Nonetheless, they team up to battle Kang the Conqueror for their son Ahura (Black Bolt had earlier given Ahura over to Kang for safe-keeping during the incursions). Unwelcome in Attilan, Black Bolt now runs the "Quiet Room," a nightclub that functions as a neutral zone for metahumans. At one point, a resurrected Auran steals his voice, but it is restored with the help of Sterilon.

During the "Death of X" storyline, Black Bolt is framed for the death of Cyclops.

When the truce between the Inhumans and X-Men is broken during the Inhumans vs. X-Men storyline, Black Bolt is subsequently ambushed by Emma Frost and Dazzler in the Quiet Room. A disguised Dazzler is able to absorb the energy from his voice and counterattack him with it. He is held captive by the X-Men in Forge's workshop in the dimension of Limbo until his rescue by Medusa and the Inhumans. He helps Medusa neutralize Emma Frost. In the aftermath, there is hope of reconciliation between the Royal couple as she joins Black Bolt in the Quiet Room.

Black Bolt and a group of Inhumans tracked down Maximus and captured him for his trial. Black Bolt later spoke to Maximus privately.

Black Bolt was imprisoned in a deep space torture prison that was meant for Maximus. Upon defeating his fellow inmate Absorbing Man, Black Bolt confronted the as-yet-unidentified jailer. When his quasi-sonic no longer worked, Black Bolt was killed and revived. Black Bolt later made acquaintances with Absorbing Man, Blinky, Metal Master, and Raava. After discovering that the Jailer is an Inhuman who was incarcerated in the torture prison and has since taken over it, Black Bolt and his fellow inmates fight the Jailer. Absorbing Man sacrifices himself so that Black Bolt can kill the Jailer and enable his fellow inmates to escape.

Black Bolt returns to Earth with Blinky. They inform Titania about her husband Crusher's heroic death. At the funeral, Blinky is kidnapped by Lash. He forces Black Bolt to surrender and injects him with a poison to prepare his blood to be used as part of a new Terrigen-type bomb that will produce new Inhumans. The pain of the process sends Black Bolt's mind towards Medusa's mind. They interact on a psychic plane and update each other. He finds out about Medusa's love for Gorgon and they determine that they cannot go back to their marriage. Instead, they will move forward and Medusa promises to find them as they get separated. Black Bolt breaks free only to succumb to the poison. Blinky tries to protect him, but turns into a monster channeling the Jailer.

After an encounter with the Progenitors, Medusa and Black Bolt meet on the Astral Plane and agreed to continue as partners and not lovers. When Medusa takes the Primagen, it restores her hair and health while also causing a backlash in the attacking Progenitor to destroy the approaching Progenitors causing the Ordinator-Class Progenitors that saw the attack from the World Farm to spare Earth from their invasion.

In "Death of the Inhumans," Black Bolt calls together the four Queens of the Universal Inhuman tribes to respond to this threat. However, the meeting goes far from as planned, as an Inhuman executioner named Vox, a Super-Inhuman created by the Kree, begins his bloody rampage across the place. Vox controls several Inhumans, forcing Black Bolt to battle them. During the conflict, Maximus and Triton are killed.

During the "Imperial" storyline, Black Bolt and Lockjaw arrive on the planet Kal Lak'Thunn to confront Grandmaster and a resurrected Maximus. After defeating Grandmaster, Black Bolt leaves with Maximus and Lockjaw to rebuild the Inhuman empire.

== Powers and abilities ==
Black Bolt's Terrigen-mutated physique surpasses the superhuman physique of typical Inhumans: his strength, stamina, durability, and reflexes are well above typical human or Inhuman levels. His speed and agility are highly enhanced, and he possesses superhuman senses. An organic mechanism in his brain's speech center produces an unknown particle that interacts with ambient electrons, enabling him to produce certain mentally-controlled phenomena. The most devastating of these effects is Black Bolt's "quasi-sonic scream". Because his electron-harnessing ability is linked to the speech center of his brain, any attempt to use his vocal cords triggers an uncontrollable disturbance of the particle/electron interaction field. Because of this limitation, Black Bolt must be constantly vigilant of even the softest of utterances, lest he destroy anything or anyone in his path. At full strength, his voice can destroy planets, while a whisper can rock a battleship. When Black Bolt was captured and experimented on by the Skrulls, it was shown that his "Sonic Scream" is triggered by, and at least partially dependent on, his emotional state.

The fork-like antenna worn upon his forehead helps Black Bolt control his power. He can channel his powers inward to increase his strength and speed, and can focus it through the focusing tool or his arms as concussive blasts. Black Bolt is capable of channeling all available energy into one devastating punch called his Master Blow, which renders him extremely vulnerable afterward. By concentrating his electrons into anti-electrons, he can fly at speeds of up to 500 mph (800 km/h) for a period of six hours, protected by an anti-graviton field. Black Bolt can create a nearly impenetrable force field by focusing his energy around himself. He can use his electron abilities as extrasensory probes, highly sensitive to electromagnetic phenomena, and he can jam certain electromagnetic mechanisms. Though this exhausts him, he can create particle/electron interaction fields solid enough to be traversed upon.

Black Bolt is at least partially resistant to telepathy and shares a semi-telepathic bond with those of his blood (such as the Inhuman royal family), as was evident when he was able to resist the mental abilities of his telepathically powerful brother, Maximus, and on different occasions, to use his own abilities to overpower and take control of Maximus' mind. One of Black Bolt's main uses for his telepathic ability is to communicate his wishes to his wife, Medusa, who then acts as his mouthpiece to the rest of his subjects. He can also use this limited telepathy to communicate his destination wishes to the royal family's teleporting dog, Lockjaw.

== Reception ==
=== Critical reception ===
Chase Magnett of ComicBook.com called Black Bolt "one of the most outstanding creations from the legendary run of Jack Kirby and Stan Lee on Fantastic Four," writing, "Both as a leader and individual character, he remains stacked with potential. It's almost impossible to imagine any Inhumans story without referencing the Midnight King. Even when Medusa led the kingdom, the absence of Black Bolt was a potent element in all of their stories. He's a wonderful solo character as well, examining the balance of power and action. His inability to speak due to possessing so much destructive potential is the sort of central metaphor Kirby excelled at creating. Black Bolt is an iconic Marvel Comics character, and it feels like he's finally back in the spotlight where he belongs." Trevor Norkey of Screen Rant said, "Black Bolt is not only an incredible King, but he's one of Marvel's most powerful characters overall. Though he can't talk, his true power is displayed in his energy blasts that protrude from his mouth, making him a force that very few actually want to mess with, let alone overthrow. Like Medusa, Black Bolt is fairly well respected among the residents of Attilan, making him into one of the greatest leaders in all of Marvel Comics. His pure strength and political prowess make him into a truly powerful force in the political spectrum of Marvel. Not only is Black Bolt well respected among the citizens of Attilan, but since the discovery of Attilan on Earth, he has become a well respected leader among the other characters in Marvel Comics. He regularly tries to make sure that the people of Earth know that he is not a threat, and instead an ally. Since the Inhumans became significantly more popular in Marvel Comics over the past decade, Black Bolt has become an incredibly interesting character to follow."

Jesse Schedeen of IGN included Black Bolt in their "7 Inhumans We Want on Agents of S.H.I.E.L.D." list, saying, "Black Bolt is pretty much the top dog when it comes to the Inhumans. He's the king of his people and the ruler of the hidden city of Attilan. He's charged with maintaining this secret empire and ensuring that future generations of Inhumans continue to survive and evolve. He's an integral character to the mythology, and it's tough to imagine Agents of S.H.I.E.L.D. delving too deeply into Inhuman matters without Black Bolt putting in an appearance. However, much of what makes this character appealing is his power and the terrible toll it takes on all facets of his life." ComicsAlliance ranked Black Bolt 2nd in their "Marvel's Royal Inhumans, Ranked From Worst To Best" list, stating, "If you're into the strong, silent type, they don't come much stronger than Black Bolt, or much more silent. The king doesn't say much, because his voice has the power to level cities, but that's helped lend the character an air of aloof mystery that makes him more compelling. He's insanely powerful, but fascinatingly contained, and as he watches and unpacks the politics of the Marvel Universe, we all want to know what he's thinking. Two other factors make Black Bolt a popular favorite: First, his Kirby-designed costume is one of the all-time greats, from his thunderous lederhosen to his tuning fork diadem. No-one looks cooler. Second, his real name is Blackagar Boltagon, which is so excessively ridiculous that it loops back around to amazing."

Screen Rant included Black Bolt in their "10 Best Black Panther Comics Characters Not In The MCU" list. Comic Book Resources ranked Black Bolt 1st in their "20 Most Powerful Inhumans" list, 1st in their "10 Inhumans Who Should Join The Avengers" list, 2nd in their "10 Most Powerful Members Of Royalty In Marvel Comics" list, and 9th in their "Every Member Of The Illuminati" list.

== Literary reception ==
=== Volumes ===
==== Black Bolt (2017) ====
According to Diamond Comic Distributors, Black Bolt #1 was the 57th best selling comic book in May 2017.

The Black Bolt comic book series won Best New Comic Series while Christian Ward received a nomination for Best Artist at the 2017 Golden Issue Awards. Entertainment Weekly named the Black Bolt comic book series "Best Debut" in their "Best Comics of 2017" list. The series also won Best New Series in the 2018 Eisner Awards.

Kelsey McConnell of ComicsVerse gave Black Bolt #1 a score of 82%, asserting, "As someone who's not overly familiar with the ins and outs of the Inhumans, I was at first skeptical about embarking on the journey that is Black Bolt #1. However, the titular character's first solo issue provides easy access for less informed readers. More than that, it offers a storyline that's both emotionally compelling and rife with mystery. [...] Overall, Black Bolt #1 is an exciting read. It's a story that reaches out and digs its claws into the heart — an endless cycle of powerlessness and loss. While the story and the stacked complications had me madly flipping pages, I was a little wanting for more characterization. Sure, I cared why all these horrible things were happening, but I want a reason to care why they happened to Black Bolt specifically. I want a hero who is more than his powers, especially when he loses them." Mark Peters of Paste gave Black Bolt #1 a grade of 8 out of 10, writing, "Pairing a great writer from outside comics with one of the best talents inside comics is a great move. Based on a promising first issue, this could end up being one of Marvel's stronger titles, alongside recent gems Moon Knight and The Mighty Thor. [...] This is a promising start to a series that could go anywhere. Black Bolt has always been a tragic figure thanks to his preposterously destructive voice, but he's never gotten a true spotlight. Ahmed and Ward have talent to spare and look like they've found a story worth telling."

==== Darkhold: Black Bolt (2021) ====
According to Comichron, Darkhold: Black Bolt #1 was the 161st best selling comic book in December 2021.

Dustin Holland of Comic Book Resources called Darkhold: Black Bolt #1 an "entertaining sci-fi mystery," writing, "Darkhold: Black Bolt #1 stands out among the Darkhold books as the most visually and structurally distinct. Its ending calls all of the audience's assumptions about Black Bolt's role in the series into question, leaving fans anxious for the next installment of Darkhold. Mark Russell's writing is entertaining and nuanced enough to reward multiple readings, but Cutler and Poggi's art steals the show in this issue as they present the hero in a landscape that feels at once classic and brand new." Chase Magnett of ComicBook.com gave Darkhold: Black Bolt #1 a grade of 4 out of 5, saying, "Black Bolt's tale of a twisted reality in which his mainstream dreams are transformed into nightmares emerges as a blend of gothic romance and Silver Age-style aesthetics in a plot centered upon its unreliable narrator. The essential twist at its center is hinted at early in the pages and, while it's nothing superhero fans haven't seen before, is delivered in a very satisfying fashion. What sets this classic retelling apart beyond its confident slow revelations of the truth are David Cutler's depictions of Black Bolt's current state and his past in Attilan. Kirby-inspired tech fills the city and its fashions in splash panels filled with impossible machines and royal attendants. These bright visions lit with the same charm as prime-era Fantastic Four ideas highlight just how grim Black Bolt's own predicament truly is as well as an artist who is developing a polished and promising style perfectly suited to the genre. The Darkhold: Black Bolt emphasizes its own tale of horror and executes on its premise quite well, regardless of how this may factor into the larger event design."

== Other versions ==
A number of alternate universe versions of Black Bolt have appeared throughout the character's publication history, including in the series What If?, Age of Apocalypse, Heroes Reborn, Mutant X, Earth X, House of M, Marvel Zombies, Old Man Logan, and Ultimate Marvel. Vykin the Black Bolt, a composite character based on Black Bolt and DC Comics character Vykin, appears in the Amalgam Comics universe.

== In other media ==
Character poster of Anson Mount as Black Bolt for the 2017 Marvel Cinematic Universe (MCU) television series, Inhumans.

=== Television ===
- Black Bolt makes non-speaking appearances in Fantastic Four (1994).
- Black Bolt appears in Ultimate Spider-Man, voiced by Fred Tatasciore.
- Black Bolt appears in Avengers Assemble, voiced again by Fred Tatasciore.
- Black Bolt appears in Hulk and the Agents of S.M.A.S.H., voiced by Clancy Brown.
- Black Bolt appears in Guardians of the Galaxy, voiced by Trevor Devall.
- Black Bolt appears in Inhumans (2017), portrayed primarily by Anson Mount, while his younger self is portrayed by Lofton Shaw.
- Black Bolt appears in Marvel Future Avengers, voiced again by Fred Tatasciore.

=== Film ===
- Black Bolt makes a non-speaking appearance in Planet Hulk as a member of the Illuminati.
- An alternate universe variant of Black Bolt from Earth-838 appears in Doctor Strange in the Multiverse of Madness, portrayed again by Anson Mount. He is a member of the Illuminati before Wanda Maximoff kills them.

=== Video games ===
- Black Bolt appears as a non-playable character in Marvel: Ultimate Alliance. He provides the heroes with a base on Attilan after Doctor Doom acquires the power of Odin and reshapes Earth in his image.
- Black Bolt appears as a DLC character in LittleBigPlanet.
- Black Bolt appears as a limited-time unlockable character in Marvel: Avengers Alliance.
- Black Bolt appears as a playable character in Lego Marvel Super Heroes.
- Black Bolt appears as a playable character in Marvel Contest of Champions.
- Black Bolt appears as a playable character in Marvel's Mighty Heroes.
- Black Bolt appears as a playable character in Marvel: Future Fight.
- Black Bolt appears as a playable character in Marvel Heroes.
- Black Bolt appears as a playable character in Marvel Puzzle Quest.
- Black Bolt appears as a playable character in Lego Marvel Super Heroes 2.
- Black Bolt appears as a playable character in Marvel Powers United VR, voiced again by Fred Tatasciore.
- Black Bolt appears as a non-playable character in Marvel Ultimate Alliance 3: The Black Order, voiced by Liam O'Brien.
- Black Bolt appears as a playable character in Marvel Strike Force.
- Black Bolt appears in Marvel Snap.

== Collected editions ==
| Title | Material collected | Publication Date | ISBN |
|---|---|---|---|
| Black Bolt Vol. 1: Hard Time | Black Bolt #1-6 | December 19, 2017 | 978-1302907327 |
| Black Bolt Vol. 2: Home Free | Black Bolt #7-12 | June 19, 2018 | 978-1302907334 |
| Black Bolt | Black Bolt #1-12 | January 14, 2020 | 978-1302921408 |
| The Darkhold | The Darkhold: Black Bolt #1 and The Darkhold: Alpha #1, The Darkhold: Blade #1, The Darkhold: Wasp #1, The Darkhold: Iron Man #1, The Darkhold: Spider-Man #1, The Darkhold: Omega #1 | March 1, 2022 | 978-1302925840 |
