= X-Tinction Agenda =

Marvel Comics storyline

- Cover of The Uncanny X-Men 270 (Nov 1990), art by Jim Lee. First chapter of the X-Tinction Agenda storyline.
- Publisher: Marvel Comics
- Publication date: November 1990 – January 1991
- Genre: Superhero; Crossover
Title(s)
The New Mutants #95-97
The Uncanny X-Men #270-272
X-Factor #60-62
- Main character(s): X-Men; X-Factor; New Mutants; Cameron Hodge

Creative team
- Writer(s): Louise Simonson; Chris Claremont
- Artist(s): Jim Lee; Rob Liefeld; Jon Bogdanove; Guang Yap

"X-Tinction Agenda" is a 1990 crossover comic book storyline published by Marvel Comics that ran through Uncanny X-Men and its spin-off titles, X-Factor and New Mutants. "X-Tinction Agenda" not only reunited the X-Men after a prolonged period in which the team had been scattered around the globe (following the events of Uncanny X-Men #246-251), but featured the combined might of the three mutant teams for the first time, in their fight against the mutant-exploiting Genoshan government.

== Plot ==
Genoshan magistrates, backed by the cyborg Cameron Hodge, and including an amnesiac Havok (a member of the X-Men), attack the X-Mansion and kidnap Storm and the New Mutants Warlock, Boom Boom, Rictor, and Wolfsbane. After expending his energy on freeing the others from their cell, Warlock is taken to have his power transferred to Hodge. Wolfsbane returns to rescue him, but instead unintentionally causes the transfer to go awry, killing Warlock. Wolfsbane is brainwashed, turned into one of Genosha's mindless mutate slaves, which form the backbone of the Genoshan economy and lifestyle. The remaining New Mutants and the X-Men recruit X-Factor and head to Genosha to save their teammates, only to be ambushed by Havok and the Genoshan magistrates. As Cyclops unsuccessfully attempts to jog Havok's memory, the Genoshans meet a humiliating defeat.

Wolverine, Psylocke, and Jubilee rescue Rictor and Boom-Boom from Genoshan magistrates. After entrusting Rictor and Boom Boom to the care of Jubilee, Psylocke and Wolverine put on the magistrates' uniforms to enter Hammer Bay. Havok, seeing someone else is wearing his lover's uniform, attacks his former teammates. Psylocke incapacitates Havok, but Hodge takes her and Wolverine prisoner. Meanwhile, Storm attempts to kill Genoshan engineer David Moreau, but is captured and enslaved by Hodge. Jean, Cable, Gambit, Sunspot, and Forge place bombs throughout the outer levels of the capitol building, the Citadel, but are captured after the magistrate Wipeout blocks their powers. The remaining heroes set a trap at their hideout and attack the Citadel, but are defeated. Wanting payback for his earlier humiliation, Havok confronts Cyclops personally. This time Cyclops succeeds in making Havok remember who he is. However, deciding his only chance of helping is as an inside man, Havok tranquilizes Cyclops and turns him over to Hodge.

The X-Men, X-Factor, and New Mutants are put on trial, but when Wolverine attempts to kill the judge, he turns them over to Hodge to do with as he will. Pretending to be traumatized by Hodge's brutalities, Psylocke submits herself to the mutate process. She then escapes while being taken to Moreau. Once the others are left alone, Gambit uses a dart Hodge fired into his leg to pick their locks. Thinking the mutants are all safely captured, Hodge initiates his plan to betray Genosha, killing a number of magistrates, including Wipeout. The Chief Magistrate turns to the mutant teams for help against Hodge, using Storm's electrical power to restore their powers. The process inexplicably also undoes Storm's brainwashing and restores her to adulthood.

Jubilee, Rictor, and Boom-Boom stumble upon Moreau, who is taking his own steps to counter Hodge's treachery. He takes them to the Citadel. There, they are reunited with their teammates. Moreau directs Wolfsbane to change into wolf form; only by remaining in this form can she be free of her brainwashing. Moreau shoots Hodge with a prototype weapon, but Hodge kills him before he can finish him off. The mutant teams hunt Hodge throughout the Citadel, with Cyclops and Havok finally destroying his body. Hodge's severed head still lives on due to the immortality bestowed on him by N'Astirh, so Rictor brings down the Citadel, burying him alive. Days later, Havok and Wolfsbane decide to stay in Genosha to help settle tensions between humans and mutants. The mutant heroes return home and hold a funeral for Warlock. Per Wolfsbane's wishes, they spread his ashes over the grave of their teammate Cypher.

== Impact ==
Published during the comic book speculator boom, the involvement of Jim Lee and Rob Liefeld caused the issues of the crossover to sell for $10–20 on the secondary market when the books were first published, though the issues have since gone down in value.

The storyline also had several lasting effects on the various titles.

- The loss of longtime New Mutants members Wolfsbane, Rictor and Warlock would begin the book's transition to X-Force.
- The various X-Men in the story (Storm, Wolverine, Banshee, Forge, Psylocke, Jubilee, Gambit) would form the first official X-Men roster since the Australia-based team disbanded.
- The mutate process would psychically bind Wolfsbane to Havok - a plot thread that would be picked up after both joined X-Factor.

== Secret Wars (2015) ==
The Secret Wars storyline features a new "X-Tinction Agenda" miniseries that is part of the event. It takes place on the Battleworld domain of X-Topia.

== Chronological reading order ==
1. The Uncanny X-Men #270 (November 1990)
2. The New Mutants #95 (November 1990)
3. X-Factor #60 (November 1990)
4. The Uncanny X-Men #271 (December 1990)
5. The New Mutants #96 (December 1990)
6. X-Factor #61 (December 1990)
7. The Uncanny X-Men #272 (January 1991)
8. The New Mutants #97 (January 1991)
9. X-Factor #62 (January 1991)

== Collected editions ==
The storyline has been collected into a trade paperback:

- X-Men: X-Tinction Agenda (224 pages, September 17, 2001, ISBN 0871359227)

Collects The Uncanny X-Men #270-272; The New Mutants (1983) #95-97; X-Factor (1986) #60-62

- X-Men: X-Tinction Agenda (328 pages, September 6, 2016, ISBN 1302901001)

Collects The Uncanny X-Men #235-238, #270-272; The New Mutants (1983) #95-97; X-Factor (1986) #60-62

- The New Mutants Epic Collection v.8 The End of the Beginning (504 pages, 2022)

Collects The Uncanny X-Men #270-272; The New Mutants (1983) #95-97; X-Factor (1986) #60-62 among others.

It has also been collected into a hardcover:

- X-Men: X-Tinction Agenda (304 pages, August 10, 2011, ISBN 0785155317)

Collects The Uncanny X-Men #235-238, #270-272; The New Mutants (1983) #95-97; X-Factor (1986) #60-62
