= Inhumans vs. X-Men =

Limited series published by Marvel Comics, 2016-2017

- Cover of Inhumans vs. X-Men #1 (December 2016). Art by Leinil Francis Yu.

Publication information
- Publisher: Marvel Comics
- Format: Limited series
- Genre: Superhero, Crossover
- Publication date: November 2016 – March 2017
- No. of issues: 6
- Main character(s): Inhumans; X-Men

Creative team
- Written by: Charles Soule; Jeff Lemire
- Penciller(s): Leinil Francis Yu; Kenneth Rocafort; Javi Garron

Inhumans vs. X-Men, also stylized IvX or IVX, is a 2016 American comic book limited series published by Marvel Comics. The series ran for seven issues, beginning with a prologue issue #0 in November 2016 before officially beginning in December 2016 and ending in March 2017. The series was written by Charles Soule and Jeff Lemire with art by Leinil Francis Yu, Kenneth Rocafort, and Javi Garron. The series features a battle over the Terrigen Mist, a substance which the Inhumans need to gain superpowers but is deadly to the mutant X-Men and other mutant individuals.

== Publication history ==
Inhumans vs. X-Men was announced by Marvel's Chief Creative Officer Joe Quesada on July 23, 2016, during his "Cup o' Joe" panel at San Diego Comic-Con. This story closes the story arcs established at the end of 2015's Secret Wars event. Prior to releasing Inhumans vs. X-Men, Marvel released the four-part bimonthly series Death of X to serve as a prequel that would lead into the events of Inhumans vs. X-Men. In a Comic-Con interview, Lemire discussed the broader, real-world implications of the event: "X-Men stories have always been very allegorical and very symbolic for real world events. I think there is a permeating sense of fear and mistrust that is driving a lot of world events at the moment, and a lot of hatred and violence. So it's not hard to see the mutant/Inhuman conflict as a metaphor for much of what's going on around us." Marvel editor Sana Amanat announced after the series' second issue that following the event, Marvel would release "a whole new line of X-Men and Inhumans titles." The ending of Inhumans vs. X-Men served as a lead-in for the announced ResurrXion event, which saw the titles referenced by Amanat released. These original titles and continuations of past titles include Inhumans Prime, Royals, Black Bolt, Secret Warriors, X-Men Prime, X-Men Gold, X-Men Blue, Generation X, Weapon X, Jean Grey, Cable, and Iceman. The series was released in trade paperback form on July 18, 2017.

== Plot ==
Beast works with Iso to find a cure for the Terrigen Mist cloud, which is toxic to mutants. At the same time, Emma Frost begins to face Black Bolt in order to avenge Cyclops. Beast soon overhears Medusa telling the rest of the Inhuman Royal Family to be prepared for the possibility of war against the X-Men as he discovers that the Terrigen cloud is becoming more saturated.

Beast calls a meeting with representatives from each major mutant team. After updating them on the Terrigen cloud and suggesting they leave earth for good, Emma and Magneto hint at the possibility of war. Storm initiates a vote that ends in favor of destroying the Terrigen Cloud instead of leaving the planet. Wanting to avoid any conflict, Beast attempts to return to Attilan, but Storm reluctantly attacks him from behind and reveals that she supported Emma and Magneto's plans from the beginning.

Several of the X-Men work to get all of the heavy-hitters from the Inhuman Royal Family out of the way as the rest of the X-Men attack New Attilan. Medusa sends Iso and Inferno to find out what happened to Black Bolt and Crystal as she prepares for battle. It is revealed that all of the captured Inhumans along with Human Torch are sent to Limbo. Iso and Inferno are pursued by Wolverine and the time-displaced Angel. They manage to escape through a portal just before Wolverine can harm them. On the other side of the portal, they find Old Man Logan waiting for them.

While Inferno distracts Logan, Iso discovers Forge nearby with a device that the X-Men are planning to use to alter the structure of the Terrigen Cloud so they can incinerate it. Iso and Inferno manage to defeat Logan and take Forge prisoner. In Limbo, Medusa and the rest of the Royal Family start planning their escape. It is revealed that the X-Men have Black Bolt hidden away in a specially-made prison.

Mosaic arrives at Muir Island to find out any information that he can about what the X-Men are planning. He manages to enter Magneto's mind while his helmet is off and sees everything that took place from the X-Men's point of view leading up to the war. Magneto discovers Mosaic and begins to fight back until Mosaic leaves and escapes. Mosaic possesses the time-displaced Cyclops and manages to escape to find the rest of his team and tells them what he's learned, prompting his team to switch sides.

Karnak fights Fantomex and Jean and escapes when Lockjaw appears to him. Inside Forge's lab, Havok guards Black Bolt's cell. Havok relents and lets them take Black Bolt. Karnak arrives with Lockjaw and helps the Royal Family escape Limbo. The young Inhumans, along with Forge and young Cyclops, decide to help the mutants destroy the cloud. They track the cloud to Iceland where the rest of the X-Men ambush them, assuming that the Inhumans kidnapped Cyclops and Forge.

The Royal Family finally arrives in Iceland and joins the battle, making Emma determined to kill all of the Inhumans. The X-Men begin to notice Emma's uncharacteristic bloodlust as she and the Stepford Cuckoos begin mind-controlling several of the Inhumans in order to turn them against each other. Forge arrives with Moon Girl, Ahura, and the Ennilux with a new device to destroy the Terrigen Cloud. Iso and Moon Girl explain to Medusa why they need to destroy the cloud. Now fully understanding the gravity of the situation, Medusa destroys the cloud herself, voluntarily ending the war. Still craving vengeance, Emma releases an army of hidden Sentinels reprogrammed to kill Inhumans and begins massacring the Ennilux. Cyclops exposes Emma's lies and reveals that she faked the older Cyclops' death in order to trigger this war, prompting the X-Men and Inhumans to unite against her. Medusa attempts to calm her down and reason with her, but Havok intervenes and captures Emma and disappears with her. Now wanted by both the Inhumans and the X-Men, Emma goes deep into hiding. Medusa abdicates the throne and gives all leadership duties to Iso, knowing that her people will not understand why she destroyed the remaining Terrigen Cloud. Now free of the burdens of being a queen, Medusa happily reunites with Black Bolt in the Quiet Room.

== Aftermath ==
The ending of Inhumans vs. X-Men served as a lead-in for the announced RessurXion event, which would feature brand new titles for Inhumans and X-Men. New titles and new volumes of past titles include Inhumans Prime, Royals, Black Bolt, Secret Warriors, X-Men Prime, X-Men Gold, X-Men Blue, Generation X, Weapon X, Jean Grey, Cable, and Iceman.

Maximus tries to enact a failed attempt to turn the remaining Inhumans against each other, leading to his arrest and Medusa using her final act as queen to sentence him to solitude. Before his sentence, Maximus reveals a disturbing secret to Black Bolt. The Inhumans try to cope with the fact that they might be the final generation of Inhumans due to Medusa sacrificing the Terrigen cloud so the mutants could survive on Earth. Iso's first act as queen is to make the Inhuman government a democracy of elected officials so everyone has a voice instead of relying upon only royal blood to rule, and decrees that Inhumans work more closely alongside the humans and their governments now that there are to be no more new Inhumans. Marvel Boy approaches Crystal and informs her about a potential way to create new Terrigen, prompting the Royal Family to travel to space to learn new information on Terrigenesis that they never knew before.

The X-Men try to move forward with their lives and come out of hiding now that the threat of extinction is finally gone. Magneto's team of X-Men disbands and Psylocke kills him for taking part in Emma's deceptions that led to the war. Unbeknownst to her, Magneto was prepared for her to kill him so he had Exodus and Elixir find him and revive him so they could continue with their agenda. Storm's team of X-Men vacates Limbo and the mutant refugees return home now that the Terrigen is no longer a threat to them. No-Girl manages to track Cerebra's whereabouts and they're able to upload her consciousness from her damaged-beyond-repair body into a new mechanism. Feeling guilty for having led the X-Men to war instead of looking for a diplomatic solution, Storm steps down as leader of the X-Men and recruits Kitty Pryde to take over leadership duties and attempts to quit the X-Men. Kitty has Storm stay, however Storm spends much time questioning her own morality. Kitty relocates the X-Men from Limbo to Central Park in hopes of helping the X-Men reestablish themselves as heroes instead of hiding in fear all the time even though the general populace fears mutants even more due to their war against the Inhumans.

== Issue list ==
=== Main series ===
- IVX #0–6

=== Tie-ins ===
- All-New X-Men (vol. 2) #17–18
- Deadpool & the Mercs for Money (vol. 2) #7–8
- Extraordinary X-Men #17–19
- Uncanny Inhumans #18–20
- Uncanny X-Men (vol. 4) #16–18

== Collected editions ==
Title	Material collected	Published date	ISBN
Inhumans vs. X-Men	IVX #0-6	July 2017	978-1302906535
Uncanny X-Men Vol. 4: IVX	Uncanny X-Men (vol. 4) #16-19, Annual #1	August 2017	978-1302905255
Extraordinary X-Men Vol. 4: IVX	Extraordinary X-Men #17–20, X-Men Prime #1	August 2017	978-0785199373
All-New X-Men Vol. 4: IVX	All-New X-Men (vol. 2) #17–19, Annual #1, X-Men Prime #1	September 2017	978-1302905231
Uncanny Inhumans Vol. 4: IVX	Uncanny Inhumans #15–20	May 2017	978-1302903121
Deadpool & the Mercs for Money Vol. 2: IVX	Deadpool & the Mercs for Money (vol. 2) #6-8, Deadpool Annual #1	April 2017	978-1846538056

== Reception ==
The series holds a score of 7.3 out of 10 on comic book review aggregator Comic Book Roundup, indicating mixed reviews. The prologue and first two issues received favorable reviews, but the later issues received increasingly lower scores. Of the early issues, critics complemented the build-up from Soule, saying he did "incredible work capitalizing on the potential he has always had," and referring to Rocafort's art as "amazing." Of the later issues, critics remarked that the storyline had largely fallen flat. Newsarama critic Joe Edsall, who had initially written favorably of the series, gave the series ending a five out of ten: "The biggest positive is that Lenil Francis Lu manages to deliver a consistent stream of vivid panels ground otherwise chaotic scenes. The sense of an arc down the line with supervillain Emma Frost gives the finale a powerful sense of foreboding, but it makes this feels more like a set-up for the Inhumans and X-Men Prime books, which is a shame. IvX started out as something really special, but the finale doesn't quite stick the landing." Kabooooom critic Marcus Hammond noted that "[w]ith Lemire, Soule, and Yu at the helm, this should have been one of the best issues on the stand [this week]. Unfortunately, the numerous small problems with characterization and the lack of tension in the visuals force readers to question the direction ResurrXion will lead these two critically important teams."

=== Sales ===
Data taken from the Diamond Comics Distributors website, ICv2, and Comichron.

Inhumans vs. X-Men
Issue	Peak	Sales (est)	Ref
0	10	84,181	
1	2	167,703	
2	17	62,723	
3	18	61,638	
4	16	56,969	
5	20	53,348	
6	22	52,811	
