= Lash =

Lash or Lashing may refer to:

- Eyelash
- Whiplash (disambiguation)
- Lashing (ropework), a form of connecting solid objects tightly using rope or cord
- Flagellation, a form of torture or punishment involving a whip
- Backlash (engineering), clearance between mating components

== Films ==
- The Lash (1916 film), a 1916 American silent film directed by James Young
- The Lash (1930 film), an American western film
- The Lash (1934 film), a British drama film

== People ==
- Lash (surname)
- Lash LaRue (1917–1996), American actor

== Places ==
- Lash, Gilan, Iran
- Lash, Kohgiluyeh and Boyer-Ahmad, Iran
- Lash, Mazandaran, Iran

== Other uses ==
- Lash (album), 1993 EP by The Jesus Lizard
- Lash (band), an all-female alternative/punk rock band from Perth, Australia
- Lash (comics), a fictional character in Marvel Comics and Marvel's Agents of S.H.I.E.L.D.
- Lash (Sky High), a character in the 2005 American comedy film
- Lashing (ropework), a means of attaching two or more objects with rope
- Lighter aboard ship, a system of water transport
- Littoral Airborne Sensor/Hyperspectral, an imaging system developed by the United States Navy
- A lashing point such as a D-ring

== See also ==
- Lash Out (disambiguation)
- The Lash (disambiguation)
- Lashes (disambiguation)
