= Inhumanity (comics) =

Marvel Comics storyline

- Inhumanity #1 Cover (December 2013); Art by Olivier Coipel
- Publisher: Marvel Comics
- Publication date: December 2013
- Genre: Superhero; Crossover
- Main character: Inhumans

Creative team
- Writer: Various
- Artist: Various

"Inhumanity" is a 2013–14 comic book crossover storyline that ran through a number of Marvel Comics beginning in December 2013. The event follows the aftermath of "Infinity", when Terrigen Mist was released throughout the world and activated dormant Inhuman cells in ordinary people who are descendants of Inhumans. A new core ongoing title called Inhuman was launched as part of this storyline and is a focal point of this story.

== Publication history ==
"Inhumanity" was announced in July 2013 as a post-Infinity status-quo change, with Matt Fraction helming a new Inhumans series, titled Inhuman, which would be at the heart of the storyline. Axel Alonso, Marvel's editor-in-chief, said

The effect on the Marvel Universe will be seismic...You might learn that your new self is fantastic, beautiful, filled with immense power...By the same token, you could turn around and find out that you're nothing. You're a blob. You have no powers. You can create a little flame out of your pinkie.

Fraction added "Our focus characters are drawn into the palace intrigue of this shattered Inhumans Royal family. It becomes a superhero story and a mythical story, all revolving around turning the world into a world full of superheroes."

In September 2013, Marvel began releasing various teaser images asking "Is she...", "Is he...", "Are we..." leading up to the unveiling of the cover of Inhumanity #1, a one-shot to be written by Matt Fraction. Later in the month, Marvel announced a host of tie-ins to Inhumanity, including New Avengers, Avengers A.I., Mighty Avengers, Avengers Assemble, and a new limited series spinning out of Inhumanity, titled Inhumanity: The Awakening, which follows the events of Infinity: The Hunt.

A trailer was released on December 12, 2013.

== Plot ==
=== Main plot ===
Following the destruction of Attilan and the spread of Terrigen Mist across Earth, Karnak was left mentally scarred by said events and began tearing up the upper west side of Manhattan, babbling and sobbing uncontrollably. He had to be put in custody by the Avengers. In Stark Tower, Karnak explained to the Avengers what happened during their fight with Thanos and what it meant for the Inhumans. While he was questioning himself for the reason for Black Bolt to spread the Terrigen Mist and what would happen next, Karnak had an epiphany in which he finally saw "the fault in all things." He told Medusa (who was present during his interrogation) that she needed to forget everything she thought she knew, ignore her instincts and forget the past. Otherwise, all would be lost. Following this revelation in which he stated it was too late for him to unlearn a lifetime of error, Karnak shattered the window from his containment cell and jumped out of the Stark Tower, killing himself.

=== Subplots ===
Dr. June Covington has come upon the possession of a Terrigenesis Cocoon. At Stark Tower, Spider-Girl gets the attention of Captain Marvel and informs her that her social studies teacher was sent to a hospital when his Terrigenesis Cocoon activated three days before, and that both he and the cocoon had been kidnapped. Captain Marvel is unable to leave to help, but Spider-Woman and Black Widow volunteer. Their first stop is an A.I.M. station on the Lower East Side of Manhattan. Black Widow explains that since A.I.M. got themselves a country, they are now a diplomatic force and legally protected; the station is no more illegal than a CIA safehouse in Moscow. But, they still have all their old science-terror contacts in the New York underworld so the trio plan to break in, kidnap a guy, and pump him for everything he knows. However, before their target can give all the information they desire, he is shot and they are captured. The leader of the A.I.M. group introduces herself as Dr. Kashmir Vennema, who Black Widow has fought before, and she gloats that she could have them arrested for trespassing. Black Widow states that Vennema used to be an inter-dimensional arms dealer who formed an operation with her alternate selves. According to Vennema, Mr. Schlickeisen (Spider-Girl's social studies teacher) died during the Terrigenesis process and they sold his body. When it becomes apparent that the trio do not want to buy the other one, she decides to have her guards kill them. Spider-Woman tells her that is a bad idea, but Vennema cites state law: once they crossed her threshold, she was legally in the clear. At Hemoglobal Research and Lab Services, Covington walks in with the corpse and kills the only member of staff present. She will be commandeering their facilities for the weekend.

The Avengers A.I. encounter an elderly widow named Doris who turns to attorney Matt Murdock for help after her bank forecloses on her home. After being exposed to the Terrigen Mist, Doris transforms into an octopus-like creature and attacks the Avengers A.I. before being persuaded to stop by a Doombot. Doris then takes off for parts unknown with Medusa.

Luke Cage keeps the Mighty Avengers together and made the remodeled Gem Theater as their base. The Mighty Avengers now have the purpose of helping those in need. During this time, the Spider-Hero becomes the new Ronin. Barbara McDevitt (the personal bodyguard of Cortex Inc. director Jason Quantrell) was discovered to be an Inhuman descendant whose powers were activated after she suffered from Terrigenesis and remained in a cocoon for weeks. Afterwards, Cortex Inc. enlisted Barbara in her new identity of Quickfire to infiltrate the ruins of Attilan.

Geldoff is a Latverian teenager visiting the U.S. as part of a student exchange program, and begins to manifest his dormant Inhuman heritage after being exposed to the Terrigen Mist. After a brief scuffle with the X-Men, he is kidnapped by Monica Rappaccini.

Fiona is a former blogger who was exposed to the Terrigen Mist while taking selfies and subsequently began blogging about her condition, where she had mutated to having a bird-like appearance. She was rescued by members of the Avengers Academy and former members of the New X-Men after nearly falling to her death.

When Attilan exploded over New York and spread Terrigen Mist around the world, most of the wreckage landed in New York's harbor. However, enough hit the city to inconvenience people. The Superior Spider-Man (Doctor Octopus' mind in Peter Parker's body) and his Spiderlings seemingly help with the recovery while taking the rubble to strip it of valuable technological secrets. A radio message from a Spiderling brings Otto to a street where most electronics have suddenly stopped working, and find a piece of Inhuman debris on the roof of an apartment building Observing the impact site, the Superior Spider-Man and his firefighter escort Lt. Coyle realize that something has been taken, by the occupants of the apartment. Moving through the building, the Superior Spider-Man notices that the residents are strangely lethargic and realizes that whatever is draining power from electronics is also draining energy from people. Inside the apartment, the Superior Spider-Man encounters a man named Arthur Schweibe who is wearing half of a set of power armor. Arthur is angry how he and his wife played by the rules in a world without rules and were left behind. The Superior Spider-Man's web-shooters and strength begin to fail, but he manages to distract Arthur long enough to find the rest of the armor attached to Arthur's wife Susan, who has cancer. Arthur had hoped to use the armor to cure his wife, regardless of the consequences. Coyle confronts Arthur, and forces him to admit he drugged his wife so that she would be unable to stop his rampage. Defeated, Arthur lets go of the Superior Spider-Man, who disables the power source in the armor. He offers to help Susan and get her an appointment with Elias Wirtham. He asks Coyle to back up his statement that Arthur was being controlled by the armor and should be left free to support his wife. Coyle agrees, but asks the Superior Spider-Man why he is being so lenient. Thinking back to his final days as Doctor Octopus, the Superior Spider-Man merely says that no-one should die alone. Leaving the apartment, he sees the Spiderling from earlier arguing jurisdiction with the Fire Department. Spider-Man intervenes and lays down the law: when it comes to clean-up, the NYFD are to be backed without question.

Victor Kohl is the black sheep of his family. He had economic problems and even found himself having to steal the new laptop of his brother Robert Kohl. When Terrigen Mist was released onto Earth, the Kohl family went through Terrigenesis while Victor did not. While they were transferred to an Inhuman Nativity Center, he grew resentful because he thought he was adopted as he did not change. One day when he was returning drunk to his home, Victor is confronted by the Nightbringer Ring of the Mandarin which finds him acceptable to be its wearer. With its power and still under the influence of alcohol, Victor attacks the Inhuman Nativity Center where Robert is apparently killed. Iron Man stops him and Victor flees after the Golden Avenger injures his shoulder with a laser. The ring teleports Victor to a safe place. While recovering, Victor goes through Terrigenesis. As soon as he resurfaced, Victor is confronted by Medusa. She showed to him the rest of the body of his father which was destroyed during Victor's rampage in the Nativity Center. She also explained to Victor that he did not undergo Terrigenesis because the level of exposure to Terrigen Mist to activate the Terrigenesis in certain individuals can vary. She exiles Victor from the Inhumans for his actions. Victor blames himself for what he did, but the ring managed to make him blame Tony Stark from not stopping him when he was rampaging drunk. The Ring also suggested Victor's new nickname called the Exile.

Medusa and her aide Elejea are summoned to Battery Park by numerous S.H.I.E.L.D. agents as they found Eldrac alive in the debris after the clean up effort. Medusa spoke with him trying to determine what happened, so she asked Eldrac if he could transport her to where her husband Black Bolt would be, Eldrac then opened his mouth as Medusa is seen walking through. In another part of the United States, Dante Pertuz was a newly evolved Inhuman who was among many placed in a cocoon due to the release of the Terrigen Bomb that affected New York City after the Inhuman city of Attilan fell into the Hudson River. The mist traveled all around the world which included Dante's home in Des Plaines, Illinois. After coming out of the cocoon, he was approached by a fellow Inhuman named Lash who came there to see if Dante was worthy of the gifts that were given to him. He asked him what happened to his mother and he told him that she did not survive Terrigenesis. Dante's retaliation came when his body started to engulf itself into flames which he used in the form of heat blasts against Lash. During the battle, Medusa arrived via teleportation by Eldrac to interfere as part of a plan to get Dante to move to where the Inhumans are currently living.

== Titles involved ==
Much like the Age of Ultron tie-ins the numbering for ongoing titles have the suffix .INH attached.

Name	Volume	Issue(s)	Creative team	Ref.
New on-going series
Inhuman	1	#1 (April 2014)	Charles Soule (W), Joe Madureira (A)	
Other on-going series
Avengers A.I.	1	#7.INH (December 2013)	Sam Humphries (W)	
Avengers Assemble	1	#21.INH-23.INH (November 2013 - March 2014)	Kelly Sue DeConnick/Warren Ellis (W)	
Indestructible Hulk	1	#16-19(December 2013 - March 2014)	Mark Waid (W), Mahmud Asrar (A)	
Iron Man	5	#20.INH (January 2014)	Kieron Gillen (W)	
Mighty Avengers	2	#4.INH-#5.INH (December 2013)	Al Ewing (W)	
New Avengers	3	#13.INH (December 2013)	Jonathan Hickman (W), Simone Bianchi (A)	
Uncanny X-Men	3	#15.INH (December 2013)	Brian Michael Bendis (W)	
Limited series
Inhumanity	1	#1-2 (December 2013)	Matt Fraction (W), Oliver Coipel (A)	
Inhumanity: The Awakening	1	#1-2 (December 2013)	Bill Rosemann (W)	
One-Shots
Inhumanity: Superior Spider-Man	1	#1 (January 2014)	Christos Gage (W), Richard Elson (A)	

== Collected editions ==
Title	Material collected	Publication date	ISBN
Inhumanity	Avengers Assemble #21.INH-23.INH, 24–25; Inhumanity #1-2; Uncanny X-Men Vol. 3 #15.INH; Indestructible Hulk #17.INH-18.INH, 19; New Avengers Vol. 3 #13.INH; Iron Man Vol. 5 #20.INH, Inhumanity: The Awakening #1-2, Avengers AI #7, Mighty Avengers Vol. 2 #4-5.INH, Inhuman #1 & Inhumanity: Superior Spider-Man #1	June 17, 2014	978-0785190332
