= Inferno (Dante Pertuz) =

- Inferno as depicted in Uncanny Inhumans #2 (November 2015). Art by Jim Cheung.

Publication information
- Publisher: Marvel Comics
- First appearance: Inhuman #1 (June 2014)
- Created by: Charles Soule; Joe Madureira

In-story information
- Alter ego: Dante Pertuz
- Species: Inhuman
- Team affiliations: New Attilan Security Force; Inhuman Royal Family; Warriors
- Partnerships: Ms. Marvel; Black Bolt; Medusa; Gorgon; Quake
- Notable aliases: Inferno
- Abilities: Inhuman physiology granting: Enhanced strength, speed, stamina, durability, agility, and reflexes; Geo-ionikinesis granting: Immunity to extreme heat and flame; Pyroplasmic regeneration; Heat generation; Volcanic form; Volcano creation granting: Eruption inducement; Lava generation; Flight

Inferno (Dante Pertuz) is a superhero appearing in American comic books published by Marvel Comics. Created by Charles Soule and Joe Madureira, the character first appeared in Inhuman #1 (June 2014).

== Publication history ==
Dante Pertuz was created by writer Charles Soule and artist Joe Madureira as the protagonist of the Inhumans comic, Inhuman. He made his debut in the comic's first issue, which was included as a backup feature to The Amazing Spider-Man vol. 2 #1. Pertuz is either his late teens or early twenties, and is of Inhuman descent. His powers are activated when the mutagenic Terrigen Mist is spread throughout the world in the aftermath of the Inhumanity storyline, activating the powers of many latent Inhumans. Pertuz would appear in most issues of the Inhuman comic, as well as the Uncanny Inhumans series, a preview of which was featured as a backup for Marvel's Free Comic Book Day comic, All-New, All-Different Avengers.

Since his debut, Marvel pushed Pertuz as a key character in their universe, usually representing the Inhumans. He was included in the "Avengers NOW!" promotional artwork, where he was beside iconic characters such as Iron Man and the new Thor and Captain America. He was also beside Medusa as Inhuman representation in the first issue of the major crossover storyline "Secret Wars". He was featured in promotional images for the All-New, All-Different Marvel line of comics.

== Fictional character biography ==
Living in Des Plaines, Illinois, Dante Pertuz was a drummer for a wedding band to support his pregnant sister and sick mother. During the Inhumanity storyline, the Terrigen Mist (a chemical used to activate the abilities of Inhumans) flew through his neighborhood following the aftermath of Black Bolt's detonation of the Terrigen bomb during his fight with Thanos in the Infinity storyline. Dante, unknowingly of partial Inhuman descent, underwent Terrigenesis, as did his mother; his sister being spared due to not inheriting the gene. His mother was killed during the process. During all this, an Inhuman named Lash appeared, who believed that only a certain few should be chosen for the transformation. He attempts to kill the family, but Dante emerges with flame-based powers and fights off Lash. Towards the end of the fight, the Inhuman queen Medusa comes to his aid until Lash flees. She befriends Dante and he becomes the first NuHuman (people of both human and Inhuman ancestry) to join Inhuman society.

As the months go on, Dante and his sister, who suggested his Inhuman name, move to Attilan. As thousands of NuHumans are revealed across the world, with the Terrigen Mist spreading around Earth, many of them move to Attilan for safety. Dante trains as a soldier under the leadership of Gorgon and befriends fellow NuHumans Flint, Naja, and Kamala Khan. Dante is one of the main forces in protecting Attilan from several of the Inhumans' enemies, and is recruited to find the missing Inhuman king Black Bolt. Eventually, Medusa's advisor Lineage betrays the Inhumans and revealed to be an ally of Lash. As Lineage uses a codex of human and Inhuman DNA to cause the humans of Jersey City to become deranged, Dante and his friends aid Kamala in subduing the city's people until Lineage is killed by Karnak. The battle ends while his sister Gabriella is in labor. Dante goes to Gabriella as her son is born. Dante comforts his nephew, who inherited the Inhuman gene.

During the Secret Wars storyline, Earth-616 faces its imminent end as it faces an incursion with Earth-1610. Dante is present for the universe's final battle against the Children of Tomorrow alongside all the world's major superheroes. However, the universe meets its end as the world fades into oblivion, killing him, alongside Medusa and the rest of the universe. Like the rest of the people and heroes who died in the incursion, Doctor Doom saves them all and puts them on his newly created planet of Battleworld, wiping everyone's memories of the universe before it.

In Inhumans vs. X-Men, Medusa sends Inferno and Iso to find out what happened to Black Bolt while she prepares for battle. Iso and Inferno are chased by Wolverine and a time-displaced Angel. They manage to escape through a portal just before Wolverine can catch them. On the other side of the portal, they find Old Man Logan waiting for them. While Inferno distracts Logan, Iso discovers Forge nearby with a device that the X-Men are planning to use to alter the structure of the Terrigen Mist so they can destroy it. Iso and Inferno defeat Logan and Forge and destroy the device, then flee while taking Forge prisoner.

In Secret Empire, Inferno joins Daisy Johnson's Secret Warriors.

== Powers and abilities ==
As a member of the fictional offshoot of humanity, Inhumans, Inferno possesses physical strength, durability, speed, endurance, and reflexes significantly greater than the maximum potential attainable by humans. He has the ability to generate plasmoid flames from thin air without using oxygen or combustible. He can create volcanos from the ground which can project lava. When Inferno lost one of his arms, his pyroplasmic regeneration powers acted as a regenerative healing factor and granted him a new one. Under his volcanic form, his body is covered with flaming molten rocks. Inferno is capable of flight.

== Reception ==
=== Critical response ===
Christian Hoffer of ComicBook.com included Inferno in their "Five Inhumans We Want to See on Marvel's Agents of SHIELD" list. Jesse Schedeen of IGN included Inferno in their "7 Inhumans We Want on Agents of S.H.I.E.L.D." list. Screen Rant included Inferno in their "Marvel: 10 Incredible Latinx Characters" list, and ranked him 7th in their "10 Most Powerful Inhumans In The Marvel Universe" list. Comic Book Resources ranked Inferno 5th in their "10 Most Powerful Members of Marvel's Secret Warriors" list, and 14th in their "20 Most Powerful Inhumans" list.

== In other media ==
=== Television ===
- Dante Pertuz / Inferno appears in Avengers Assemble, voiced by Antony Del Rio. This version lived in Maple Falls and had his powers activated after a ship carrying Terrigen Mist crashed in the nearby mountains. Following his transformation, Dante is driven insane and attacks the Avengers and Inhumans until they use further Terrigen Mist to cure him. Dante decides to live with the Inhumans part-time in Attilan, becoming an ally of the Avengers.
- Dante Pertuz / Inferno appears in the Marvel Rising franchise, voiced by Tyler Posey.

=== Film ===
Dante Pertuz / Inferno appears in Marvel Rising: Secret Warriors, voiced by Tyler Posey.

=== Video games ===
- Dante Pertuz / Inferno appears as a playable character in Marvel: Future Fight.
- Dante Pertuz / Inferno appears as a playable character in Lego Marvel Super Heroes 2.
- Dante Pertuz / Inferno appears as a playable character in Marvel Avengers Academy, voiced by Kevin Rivera.
- Dante Pertuz / Inferno appears in Marvel's Avengers, voiced by Michael Johnston.

=== Miscellaneous ===
Dante Pertuz / Inferno appears in Marvel Rising: Ultimate Comics, voiced by Tyler Posey.

=== Merchandise ===
In 2018, Hasbro released a Dante Pertuz / Inferno doll inspired by the Marvel Rising incarnation of the character.
