= Whipper (disambiguation) =

A whipper is an especially hard or dynamic fall in rock climbing where the rope is weighed by a significant load.

Whipper may also refer to:

- Bob "Whipper" Watson (born 1970), Canadian lacrosse player
- Chris "Whipper" Layton (born 1955), American drummer
- Prince Whipper Whip (21st century), Puerto Rican rapper
- Whipper Billy Watson (1915-1990), Canadian professional wrestler
- Whipper (budgerigar) (21st century), Famous mutant bird of New Zealand

== People with the surname ==
- Lucille Whipper (1928-2021), American politician and educator
- William Whipper (1804-1876), African-American abolitionist and businessman

== See also ==
- Whip (disambiguation)
- Whipped (disambiguation)
