= Whipps =

Whipps may refer to:

- Surangel S. Whipps (1940–2026), Palauan businessman and politician
- Valerie Whipps, Palauan First Lady
- Whipps Cross, area of the London Borough of Waltham Forest in London, England
- Whipps Cross University Hospital, NHS-run University Hospital in Whipps Cross, Waltham Forest, London, England
- Whipps Millgate, Kentucky, former city in Jefferson County, Kentucky, United States

== See also ==
- Whipp
