= Lash (comics) =

Marvel Comics supervillain

- Lash as seen in Inhuman #1.

Publication information
- Publisher: Marvel Comics
- First appearance: Inhuman #1 (June 2014)
- Created by: Charles Soule; Joe Madureira

In-story information
- Species: Inhuman
- Team affiliations: Inhumans; The Lor Tribe
- Abilities: Energy manipulation; Superhuman strength

Lash is a supervillain appearing in American comic books published by Marvel Comics. The character is an Inhuman. Created by writer Charles Soule and artist Joe Madureira, he first appeared in Inhuman #1 (June 2014), and plays a key role after the release of Terrigen Mist around the globe at the conclusion of the "Infinity" storyline.

Lash appeared in the third and fifth seasons of the Marvel Cinematic Universe (MCU) series Agents of S.H.I.E.L.D., portrayed by Matt Willig as Lash and Blair Underwood as his human alter-ego Andrew Garner, previously introduced in the second season.

== Publication history ==
Lash was created by writer Charles Soule and artist Joe Madureira, and first appeared in Inhuman #1 (June 2014).

According to Charles Soule, the character comes from Orollan, another Inhuman city:

The idea was that that city only has one tiny splinter of Terrigen Crystal, which meant it couldn't do the Terrigenesis ritual that Inhumans go through at maturity to sort of figure out what their powers are going to be. People of Orollan had to be very, very selective about it and could only grant that to people they thought would get good powers. So it was almost more of a religious thing for them, more than it was just a part of Inhuman life.

Soule has said that "He's trying to do what he can to both collect strong Inhumans to help his own society, but also cleanse the planet of Inhumans who should never have received Terrigenesis in the first place", because "the idea is that not everyone on Earth sees all these new Inhumans popping up as a good thing."

== Fictional character biography ==
Born in the hidden Inhuman city of Orollan in Greenland, Lash was among the few Inhumans of his generation chosen to undergo Terrigenesis. When the Inhuman king Black Bolt activates a Terrigen Bomb above New York, flooding the world with Terrigen Mist and awakening the powers of Inhuman descendants living among humanity, Lash embarks on a mission to find all the individuals affected and judge for himself whether they are worthy to live with their new abilities. Upon arriving in Illinois, Lash encountered a newly activated Inhuman named Dante Pertuz. He attempts to persuade Dante to join him at Orollan until he is stopped by the Inhuman queen Medusa.

Recruiting a NuHuman named Jason in Minnesota, Lash teleports them both to Orollan. There, he explains that Jason and his family were descendants of the Inhumans and while his family may have died during Terrigenesis, Jason has survived and will now have a home among his fellow survivors. With their gifts, they can rebuild the city and perform wonders. Lash shows Jason the most sacred space in Orollan—the Terrigenesis chamber. Here, they hoarded the crystals that bestow Terrigenesis that will show the worthy their true form. Lash says Jason must call himself Korvostax now and introduces him to other NuHumans, who explain that humans have formed mobs and attacked them in their communities. The NuHumans in Lash's group blame Medusa. Lash's new recruits are rebuilding a wall despite a lack of prior experience. Jason asks why Lash is not showing them how to do this, and the others tell him it is not wise to speak like that—there used to be two more NuHumans in the group. The New Attilan group teleports nearby, looking to capture Lash at the advice of Lineage. Lash tells the others that Queen Medusa means to kill them, and urges them to fight. As the battle develops between the New Attilan group and Lash's group, Jason taps into his powers for the first time and begins throwing rocks at Gorgon. Lash absorbs the energy of a volcanic spring to power energy blasts that he fires randomly into the scrum. Jason is saved from death by Gorgon, who stuns Lash with a small earth tremor. Taking hold of Lash, Medusa pins him, then invites Lineage to step forward and tell Lash what he told her. Lineage explains that Black Bolt originally released the Terrigen Mist because something is coming for the Inhumans and they need everyone to hold it back with as many hidden bloodlines from every nation on Earth united. If they cannot prepare, their species (and maybe humans as well) will become extinct. Medusa gathers the NuHumans and tells Lash that he can either help her, stay away, or face defeat. It is also mentioned that Lash can tell Ennilux and the others from her what has transpired.

During the Civil War II storyline, Lash is told about Iron Man abducting Ulysses Cain from New Attilan by Maximus. He considers Iron Man's actions as an act of war against all Inhumans. In response, Lash's group destroys the Stark Manufacturing Facility SZ-4 near Zurich so that they can force Medusa's hand for an attack on Iron Man. Medusa and the Ultimates battle Lash's group until Medusa teleports them to the Triskelion, where Lash and his followers are taken into custody.

After escaping from the Triskelion, Lash and his followers learn that Black Bolt is back on Earth and is not as powerful as before. They take advantage of this and attack Black Bolt. After Lash abducts Blinky and takes him to Orollan, Black Bolt surrenders to him as Lash states that he will use Black Bolt's blood to make his own Terrigen bomb. Before Lash can enact his plan, he is killed by Blinky, who is possessed by the Jailer.

== Powers and abilities ==
Lash has various energy conversion abilities, including the ability to absorb energy and project it as disintegrating blasts from his palms.

== In other media ==
Matt Willig as Lash (top) and Blair Underwood as Lash's human form Andrew Garner (bottom) in Agents of S.H.I.E.L.D.
- Lash appears in the third season of Agents of S.H.I.E.L.D., with his human and Inhuman forms portrayed by Blair Underwood and Matt Willig respectively. This version is Andrew Garner, a psychologist at Culver University working for S.H.I.E.L.D. and the ex-husband of Melinda May. Due to his Terrigenesis being incomplete, Garner is initially able to switch between his human and Inhuman forms at will. Garner later surrenders himself to S.H.I.E.L.D. before the transformation becomes permanent and manages to say goodbye to May before completely becoming Lash. In the episode "Emancipation", Garner saves Daisy Johnson from Hive, purging her of Hive's control. Shortly afterward, he is impaled and killed by Hellfire.
- Lash appears as a playable character in Marvel: Future Fight.
