= Whip (disambiguation) =

A whip is a stick, cord, or strap, usually with a stiff handle, used for striking or as an animal training aid.

Whip or whips or WHIP or The Whip may also refer to:

== People ==
- Whip (musician), American folk singer-songwriter
- Whip Jones (1909–2001), American ski industry pioneer
- Whip Walton (born 1955), American football player

== Arts, entertainment, and media ==
=== Fictional characters ===
- Whip (character), several DC Comics characters
- Whip (King of Fighters), a video game character

=== Films ===
- The Whip (1917 film), an American silent drama film directed by Maurice Tourneur
- The Whip (1928 film), an American silent film drama directed by Charles Brabin
- The Whip (1939 film) (Spanish: El látigo), a Mexican film directed by José Bohr
- The Whip (2024 film), a British heist film directed by Christopher Presswell

=== Music ===
- Whip (percussion), a percussion instrument
- The Whip (band), a British electro-rock band
- "Watch Me (Whip/Nae Nae)", a song by the American rapper Silentó
- The Whip (album), a compilation album

=== Other uses in arts, entertainment, and media ===
- Chicago Whip, a defunct early 20th century African-American newspaper often referred to as The Whip
- WHIP (AM), a radio station (1350 AM), Mooresville, North Carolina, US
- The Whip (play), a 1909 melodrama
- The Whip (ride), an amusement ride
- The Whip, a dance move popularised by Watch Me (Whip/Nae Nae)

== Devices ==
- Whipping knot (or whipping), a binding around the end of a rope to prevent it from fraying
- Whip antenna, for radio waves
- WHIPS, Whiplash Injury Protection System in automobiles
- Whipstaff or whip, used to steer an old sailing vessel
- Whip, slang for a car

== Sports ==
- Walks plus hits per inning pitched (WHIP), a baseball statistic
- Washington Whips, a defunct US soccer/football team

== Other uses ==
- Whip (politics), a political party discipline official
- Whip (tree), a slender unbranched shoot or plant
- Whip, to punish using a whip; see Flagellation
- Walnut Whip - a chocolate sweet
- The WebRTC-HTTP Ingestion Protocol (WHIP) RFC 9725

== See also ==
- Whiplash (disambiguation)
- Whipped (disambiguation), or whipping
- Whippy (disambiguation), or Whippey
- WIP (disambiguation)
- WIPP (disambiguation)
