= Whipped =

Whipped or whipping may refer to:

- Whipped (2000 film), an American independent comedy film
- Whipped (2020 film), an Indonesian film
- Whipped!, an album by Faster Pussycat
- "Whipped", a song by Axium from The Story Thus Far
- "Whipped", a song by Jon Secada from Heart, Soul & a Voice
- "Whipping" (song), a 1994 song by grunge band Pearl Jam, from their album Vitalogy

== See also ==
- Whip (disambiguation)
- Whipped cream
- Whipper (disambiguation)
