= Avengers Assemble (comics) =

2012 comic book series

- Cover of Avengers Assemble #1 (March 2012). Art by Mark Bagley.

Publication information
- Publisher: Marvel Comics
- Schedule: Monthly
- Format: (vol. 1); Ongoing series (vol. 2); Limited series
- Genre: Superhero
- Publication date: (vol. 1); March 2012 – March 2014 (vol. 2); September 2024 – January 2025
- No. of issues: (vol. 1): 25 plus 1 Annual (vol. 2): 5

Creative team
- Written by: (vol. 1); Brian Michael Bendis, Kelly Sue DeConnick, Warren Ellis (vol. 2); Steve Orlando
- Artist(s): (vol. 1); Stefano Caselli, Matteo Buffagni, Pepe Larraz, Barry Kitson, Paco Diaz, Neil Edwards, Raffaele Ienco
- Penciller(s): (vol. 1); Mark Bagley, Pete Woods, Butch Guice, Barry Kitson, Matteo Buffagni (vol. 2); Cory Smith, Scot Eaton, Marcelo Ferreira
- Inker(s): (vol. 1); Danny Miki, Scott Hanna, Tom Palmer, Rick Magyar, Gary Erskine, Jay Leisten, Drew Geraci (vol. 2); Oren Junior, Elisabetta D'Amico, Roberto Poggi

Avengers Assemble is a comic book series featuring the Marvel Comics superhero team the Avengers. The first title was an ongoing series whose initial release coincided with the release of the 2012 film The Avengers.

The 2012 series was originally featured as an Avengers book featuring the cast from the 2012 film, designed to attract fans of Marvel's cinematic universe to the comics. After issue #8, it switched focus to showing different Avengers between missions. Beginning with #14 A.U., it has become the Avengers book used for crossovers. The series ended in March 2014.

In 2024, it was announced that the title would revived as a five-issue limited series, featuring both veterans and new recruits being added to a new team called the Avengers Emergency Response Squad.

== Publication history ==
Brian Michael Bendis wrote the first eight issues after which Kelly Sue DeConnick and Stefano Caselli took over as part of Marvel NOW!.

The 2024 limited series was written by Steve Orlando and illustrated by Cory Smith. It takes place following the "Blood Hunt" crossover event.

== Team roster ==
=== 2012 series ===
The Avengers Assemble ongoing series began its run featuring the six members from the 2012 film. From issue #9 and on, it does not have an official roster, instead focusing on various Avengers.

Issues	Team roster
#1-8 (2012)	Captain America, Hulk, Iron Man, Thor, Black Widow, Hawkeye
#9-11 (2012-2013)	Captain America, Hulk, Iron Man, Thor, Captain Marvel, Spider Woman
Annual #1 (2013)	Vision, Captain Marvel, Iron Man
#12-13 (2013)	Black Widow, Hawkeye, Spider Woman
#14 A.U (2013)	Age of Ultron tie-in: Black Widow
#15 A.U (2013)	Age of Ultron tie-in: Captain Britain, Captain Marvel, Excalibur, Black Knight
#16-17 (2013)	The Enemy Within tie-in: Captain America, Hulk, Thor, Captain Marvel, Spider-Woman, Black Widow, Falcon, Hawkeye, Wasp, Wolverine
#18 (2013)	Infinity tie-in: Spider-Woman, Captain America, Thor, Hulk, Hawkeye, Captain Marvel, Black Widow, Hyperion, Shang-Chi, Manifold, Sunspot, Cannonball, Star Brand, Ex Nihilo, Abyss
#19 (2013)	Infinity tie-in: Spider-Woman, Black Widow, Manifold, Shang-Chi, Captain America, Bruce Banner, Falcon, Hyperion, Thor, Captain Marvel, Hawkeye, Sunspot, Cannonball, Star Brand, Abyss, Nightmask, Captain Universe
#20 (2013)	Infinity tie-in: Uncanny Avengers (Scarlet Witch, Wonder Man, Wasp)
#21.INH (2013)	Inhumanity tie-in: Spider-Girl (Anya Corazon), Spider-Woman, Black Widow
#22.INH (2013)	Inhumanity tie-in: Spider-Girl (Anya Corazon), Spider-Woman, Black Widow, Hulk, Captain America, Wolverine
#23.INH (2013)	Inhumanity tie-in: Spider-Girl (Anya Corazon), Spider-Woman, Wolverine
#24 (2013)	Spider-Girl (Anya Corazon), Iron Man, Captain America
#25 (2013)	Spider-Girl (Anya Corazon), Iron Man, Captain America, Spider-Woman, Wolverine, Hulk, Captain Marvel

=== 2024 series ===
Inspired by the impromptu Avengers team he formed during the "Blood Hunt" event, Captain America forms a rapid-response rescue team based out of Avengers Mansion called the Avengers Emergency Response Squad, or the AVENG.E.R.S., featuring a lineup which includes Wasp, Hawkeye, Hercules, She-Hulk, Photon, Night Thrasher, Lightning, Wonder Man, Shang-Chi, and Lightspeed. Due to the rapid response nature of the team, on hand members are immediately deployed while the others remain behind at the Avengers Mansion; the members sent out changes every issue. Unbeknownst to the AVENG.E.R.S., the threats they deal with are orchestrated by the Serpent Society to keep them distracted while they gather mystic materials for Mephisto. Much like with the AVENG.E.R.S., the Serpent Society members sent out on this errand changes every issue as they gather ingredients for the Serpent's Tears.

Issues	AVENG.E.R.S. deployed	Threat	Serpent Society members deployed
#1	Captain America, Wasp, Photon, Shang-Chi	Sin wielding the Helmet of Erida	Sidewinder, Tiger Snake, Puff Adder, Black Mamba
#2	Captain America, Hawkeye, Night Thrasher, Hercules	Red Ghost, Primate Ghosts	Sidewinder, Asp, Tiger Snake, Princess Python
#3	She-Hulk, Wonder Man, Lightning, Lightspeed	Nightstalkers	Tiger Snake
#4	She-Hulk, Photon, Wonder Man, Hercules, Lightning	Victorious	Entire roster
#5	Entire roster	Entire roster	

Continuing past the initial miniseries under the title "Astonishing Avengers Infinity Comic", named for the Avengers team from AXIS, later issues would also see the AVENG.E.R.S. recruit Daredevil (Elektra Natchios), Human Torch (Jim Hammond), Mr. Immortal, Somnus, She-Thing, Phone Ranger, and Captain Beyond.

== Collected editions ==
Title	Material collected	Publication date	ISBN
Avengers Assemble by Brian Michael Bendis	Avengers Assemble #1-8	January 29, 2013	978-0-7851-6327-5
Avengers Assemble: Science Bros	Avengers Assemble #9-13, Annual #1	August 27, 2013	978-0-7851-6797-6
Age of Ultron	Avengers Assemble #14AU -15AU and Age of Ultron #1–10, Fantastic Four #5AU, Fearless Defenders #4AU, Superior Spider-Man #6AU, Ultron #1AU, Uncanny Avengers #8AU, Wolverine & the X-Men #27AU, Avengers #10AI	September 17, 2013	978-0-7851-5565-2
Avengers: The Enemy Within	Avengers Assemble #16-17 and Avengers: The Enemy Within #1, Captain Marvel (vol. 7) #13-14, 17	December 17, 2013	978-0-7851-8403-4
Infinity Companion	Avengers Assemble #18-20 and Captain Marvel(vol. 7)#15-16, Thunderbolts (vol. 2) #13-18, Infinity: The Hunt#1-4, Mighty Avengers(vol. 2)#1-3, Nova(vol. 5) #8-9, Superior Spider-Man Team-Up#3-4, Infinity: Heist #1-4, Fearless Defenders #10, Secret Avengers (vol. 2) #10-11, Guardians of the Galaxy (vol. 3) #8-9, Wolverine & the X-Men Annual #1	April 22, 2014	978-0-7851-8886-5
Inhumanity	Avengers Assemble #21.INH-23.INH, 24–25 and Inhumanity #1-2, Uncanny X-Men (vol. 3) #15.INH, Indestructible Hulk #17.INH-18.INH,19, New Avengers (vol. 3) #13.INH, Iron Man (vol. 5) #20	June 17, 2014	978-0-7851-9033-2
Avengers Assemble: The Forgeries of Jealousy	Avengers Assemble #21.INH-23.INH, 24-25	June 10, 2014	978-0-7851-6798-3
