= The Lash =

The Lash may refer to:

- The Lash (1916 film), a 1916 American silent film
- The Lash (1930 film), an American western film
- The Lash (1934 film), a British drama film
- Flagellation, a form of torture or punishment involving a whip

== See also ==
- Lash (disambiguation)
