= WIP =

WIP or WiP may refer to:

== Organizations ==
- World Institute of Pain, international non-profit medical organization
- Warner Independent Pictures, an American independent film division of Warner Bros.
- Washington-Ireland Program, a development program bringing Irish students to Washington, D.C.

== Political parties ==
- Wildrose Independence Party of Alberta, a political party in Alberta, Canada
- Wirtschaftspartei, the Reich Party of the German Middle Class, a political party in the Weimar Republic
- Western Independence Party of Manitoba, a former Canadian provincial political party
- Western Independence Party of Saskatchewan, an active Canadian provincial political party
- Western Independence Party, a former Canadian federal political party

== Radio stations ==
- WIP-FM, in Philadelphia, Pennsylvania
- WTEL (AM), which held the call sign WIP until 2014

== Other uses ==
- Work in process, also referred to as work in progress — an unfinished work
- Women in prison film, an exploitation film genre
- Women in print movement, an effort of second-wave feminism
- Wash-in-place, a method of cleaning the interior surfaces of closed industrial equipment (e.g. brewing, pharmaceutical, or chemical) without the need to disassemble them. See also the related Clean-in-place.
- Fraser–Winter Park station (Amtrak code WIP), a train station in Colorado
- "Wip", a track by Die Monster Die from the album Withdrawal Method
- Water Injection Plant
- Windows Insider Program

== See also ==
- VIP (disambiguation)
- Whip (disambiguation)
