= Silent War =

Comic book limited series

- Cover to Silent War #1.

Publication information
- Publisher: Marvel Comics
- Schedule: Monthly
- Format: Limited series
- Genre: Superhero
- Publication date: March – August 2007
- No. of issues: 6
- Main character(s): Black Bolt; Quicksilver; Crystal; Luna; Inhumans

Creative team
- Created by: David Hine; Frazer Irving
- Written by: David Hine
- Artist: Frazer Irving
- Letterer(s): Virtual Calligraphy; Joe Caramagna; Cory Petit
- Colorist: Frazer Irving
- Editor(s): Tom Brevoort; Molly Lazer; Aubrey Sitterson; Stephen Wacker; Joe Quesada

Collected editions
- Silent War: ISBN 0-7851-2425-X

Silent War is a six-issue Marvel Comics comic book limited series which began in January 2007. It was written by David Hine, with art by Frazer Irving.

It is a sequel to the "House of M" and "Son of M" storylines, detailing the war between the Inhumans and rest of humanity after the mutant Quicksilver steals Terrigen Mist from Attilan.

== Publication history ==
The series was published monthly with the first issue cover dated March 2007. Frazer Irving provided the art, after the original artist backed out, which was fully drawn and colored in Photoshop.

== Plot summary ==
In the opening stages of the war, Black Bolt ordered a strike on America led by Gorgon. Although the initial mission was only to order the return of the Terrigen crystals, Jolen, a young member of the Inhumans who can manipulate plants, kills innocents in a concert hall. The Inhuman task force attempts to flee the scene, but they are stopped and defeated in battle by the Fantastic Four. Gorgon surrenders and takes the blame for the unnecessary casualties and is turned over to O.N.E. While in captivity, Gorgon is exposed again to Terrigen Mist by an American scientist. The second transformation is more disastrous, turning Gorgon into a feral beast. Black Bolt then leads a contingent of Inhumans to rescue the mutated Gorgon, attacking the Pentagon and reclaiming the crystals. S.H.I.E.L.D. responds to Black Bolt's attack by sending Marines who have been exposed to the mists to assault the Inhuman capital on the moon, Attilan. These Marines possess abilities on par with the Inhumans, but are also dying due to cellular instability.

In the last issue of Silent War, the Marines again assail Attilan and are repulsed. In reality, this battle was a feint designed to allow one Marine to explode within the confines of the city, destroying Attilan. Black Bolt's brother Maximus infects the Inhuman race, taking Medusa as his queen. Luna, who was responsible for freeing Maximus from his psychic prison, goes to Black Bolt asking him what she should do. Black Bolt opens his mouth to answer. The final page of the issue is completely black.

== Planned trilogy ==
Hines had envisioned a trilogy of mini-series featuring the Inhumans with "Son of M" and "Silent War" being the first two installments of the trilogy. However, Hine's third book with the Inhumans would never come to be and the ending of "Silent War" would be invalidated in subsequent appearances of the characters. The Inhumans would not appear again until "Planet Hulk", which featured Black Bolt (imprisoned at the end of "Silent War") free and conspiring with the rest of the Illuminati to kidnap Hulk and send him into space. The character later appeared in "World War Hulk", with Medusa and Gorgon by his side. Gorgon is portrayed in his regular form not his "evolved" form from "Silent War" and Black Bolt, not Maximus, is referred to as the leader of the Inhumans. Later in the story however, the events of "Silent War" are referenced when victims of the opera house massacre speak in support of the Hulk when he forces Black Bolt and the rest of the Illuminati to fight to the death in a makeshift arena.

It would later be established in "Avengers: Illuminati Secret Invasion Special" that Black Bolt had been replaced with a Skrull. In his Fantastic Four run, Jonathan Hickman established that Black Bolt was replaced before the events of "Planet Hulk".

Marvel would later launch "Secret Invasions: Inhumans" in 2008, for the "Secret Invasion" crossover. This four issue mini-series would not be written by David Hines and retcon the entire ending of the "Silent War" series. Written by Joe Pakaski, it outright ignores Hines' plot threats as Maximus is shown in a heroic light, Attilan intact, and Medusa and most of the population not under Maximus's telepathic control and the plot point of Luna and Black Bolt the only Inhumans free from Maximus's control.

== Collected editions ==
The series has been collected into a trade paperback (144 pages, October 2007, ISBN 0-7851-2425-X).

The series is also included in War of Kings Prelude: Road to War of Kings Omnibus (hardcover omnibus, collects Son of M #1-6, X-Men: Deadly Genesis #1-6, Silent War #1-6, Secret Invasion: Inhumans #1-4, Guardians of the Galaxy (vol. 2) #1-12, Nova (vol. 4) #13-22, Nova: The Origin of Richard Rider, and War of Kings Saga), 1192 pages, April 2017,ISBN 978-1-302-90446-3
