= Lashes =

Lashes may refer to:

- Lashes, a form of Flagellation
- Eyelashes
- Lisa Lashes (born 1971), British DJ
- The Lashes, a Seattle-based power pop band

== See also ==
- Lash (disambiguation)
