= Whipp =

Whipp is a surname. Notable people with the surname include:

- Andrew Whipp, English actor who appeared in ITV soap opera Emmerdale as Callum Rennie
- Joseph Whipp (born 1941), American actor who has starred in many films and on television
- Percy Whipp (1897–1962), Scottish football player
- Peter Whipp (born 1950), South African rugby union footballer

== See also ==
- Whip (disambiguation)
