= Inhumans =

Fictional superpowered humans

- Artwork for the cover of Inhumans vol. 2, #1 (November 1998); Art by Jae Lee

Species publication information
- Publisher: Marvel Comics
- First appearance: Fantastic Four No. 45 (December 1965)
- Created by: Stan Lee (writer); Jack Kirby (artist)

Characteristics
- Place of origin: Earth
- Notable members: Inhuman Royal Family: Black Bolt (leader); Medusa; Karnak; Gorgon; Triton; Crystal; Lockjaw; Maximus; The Unspoken; New generation: Tonaja; Alaris; San; Nahrees; Jolen; Dewoz; Post-Infinity: Inferno; Lash; Ms. Marvel; Quake; Reader; Synapse II; Aero
- Inherent abilities: Varies

The Inhumans or Inhumans
- : Cover of Inhumans vol. 1, #1 (October 1975 Marvel Comics), art by Gil Kane

Series publication information
- Publisher: Marvel Comics
- Schedule: (vol. 1); Bi-monthly (vols. 2–4); Monthly
- Format: (vols. 1 and 4); Ongoing series (vols. 2 and 3); Limited series
- Genre: Superhero
- Publication date: (vol. 1); October 1975 – August 1977 (vol. 2); November 1998 – October 1999 (vol. 3); June – October 2000 (vol. 4); June 2003 – June 2004
- Number of issues: (vols. 1, 2, and 4); 12 (vol. 3); 4

Collected editions
- Inhumans: ISBN 0-7851-0753-3
- Young Inhumans: ISBN 0-7851-3382-8

The Inhumans are a superhuman race of super beings appearing in American comic books published by Marvel Comics. The comic book series has usually focused more specifically on the adventures of the Inhuman Royal Family, and many people associate the name "Inhumans" with this particular team of superpowered characters.

The Inhumans first appeared in Fantastic Four #45 (December 1965), though members Medusa and Gorgon appeared in earlier issues of that series (#36 and #44, respectively). Their home, the city of Attilan, was first mentioned years earlier, in a Tuk the Caveboy story written and drawn by Jack Kirby that appeared in Captain America Comics #1 (March 1941). The city was described as the home of a race that was evolutionarily advanced when human beings were still in the Stone Age.

The Inhuman Royal Family has been adapted to numerous Marvel animated series and video games over the years.

Inhuman characters were introduced in the Marvel Cinematic Universe (MCU) in live action in the second season of Agents of S.H.I.E.L.D., while the Inhuman Royal Family is featured in the television series Inhumans, which premiered in 2017; the latter show was critically panned and lasted only one season. Earlier, a proposed film adaptation of the Inhumans was announced in 2014 by Marvel Studios but was later removed from its slate and never came to fruition. The Inhuman race was represented by the appearance of Black Bolt in the Marvel Cinematic Universe (MCU) film Doctor Strange in the Multiverse of Madness (2022), portrayed by Anson Mount who reprised his role from the television series.

== Development ==
In a 1967 interview, Stan Lee discussed the creation of the Inhumans:

The first Inhuman that we brought in was Gorgon... And he was a fella who looked a little like a centaur or something. He could kick his foot very hard and he had great power. He could shatter a mountain by kicking his foot. He started out as a villain. We liked him so much, I should say Jack liked him so much, that he kept using him. We figured he has to come from somewhere. We decided, let him come from some strange land over in Europe, where there are a whole group of people like him. And well, what else could you call them except the Inhumans. Then Jack had to create a whole bunch of Inhumans and I think he did a great job. When it came to doing the leader, we decided, well, there was no need for them all to be villainous. I think we did have in mind that Black Bolt would eventually be a heroic type. And again, we always try to give a character a hangup so his hangup is he doesn't speak.

In a 1969 interview Kirby discussed the costumes of the Inhumans "[with] Black Bolt I began to dress up the lightning insignias. Karnak with the judo-type uniform, it's almost Japanese Oriental and half-Egyptian and Medusa with her hair"

== Publication history ==
The Inhumans first appeared in Fantastic Four No. 45 (December 1965). The Inhumans appeared as a back-up feature in Thor No. 146 (Nov. 1967) to No. 152 (May 1968) which contained their first extensive origin story. They fight the Silver Surfer in Silver Surfer No. 18 (September 1970). The Inhumans' first ongoing feature, the first six issues of which were written and pencilled by their co-creator Jack Kirby, appeared in Amazing Adventures No. 1 (Aug. 1970) to No. 10 (Jan. 1972). The characters received their own self-titled series in October 1975, which ran for 12 issues and ended in August 1977. All but issue No. 9 were written by Doug Moench, who has said he was fascinated with the shaggy God story aspect of the Inhumans. A follow-up to the series's ending appeared in Captain Marvel No. 53 (November 1977).

The Inhumans were largely absent from publications for much of the 1980s, but appeared in their own graphic novel in 1988, written by Ann Nocenti and illustrated by Bret Blevins. Nocenti followed up by making the Inhumans Karnak and Gorgon supporting cast members in Daredevil from issue No. 272 (November 1989) through No. 283 (August 1990).

An Inhumans limited series by Paul Jenkins and Jae Lee ran for 12 issues from November 1998 – October 1999. The series, which used the Inhumans as a social allegory for the U.S., won an Eisner Award for Best New Series and established the Inhumans as viable comics-selling characters. A four-issue limited series by writers Carlos Pacheco and Rafael Marín and artist José Ladrönn was published in 2000. The fourth volume (2003–2004, 12 issues) concentrated largely on new characters within the Inhumans' society.

In 2007, the Inhumans featured in the Silent War limited series by writer David Hine, and artist Frazer Irving.

Following events in the Secret Invasion, the Inhumans appeared on one side of the War of Kings storyline, with Black Bolt being made king of the Kree, facing off against Vulcan, who is leading the Shi'ar.

The 2013 event, Infinity, led to major changes in status quo for the group, with many new Inhumans, or "NuHumans", appearing as a result of the detonation of the Terrigen Bomb. Writer Charles Soule became the lead writer of the Inhuman franchise, starting with the Inhuman series, which ran for 14 issues from April 2014–June 2015. The NuHuman Kamala Khan also becomes the lead of her own title, Ms. Marvel vol. 3. Following the Secret Wars event, the franchise expanded to two ongoing titles, Uncanny Inhumans, which ran for 20 issues from 2015 to 2017, and All-New Inhumans, which ran for 11 issues. There have been two spin-off titles with Karnak running in 2015 for six issues penned by Warren Ellis and drawn by Gerardo Zaffino and Roland Boschi and Black Bolt running for 12 issues from 2017 to 2018 penned by Saladin Ahmed and drawn by Christian Ward. In 2017, Marvel announced two series involving the Inhuman royal family, Royals written by Al Ewing drawn by Kevin Libranda that was cancelled after 10 issues, and a five issue miniseries titled Inhumans: Once & Future Kings written by Christopher Priest and drawn by Phil Noto that explored the royal family's origins.

In July 2018, Marvel launched a new five-issue miniseries titled Death of the Inhumans written by Donny Cates and drawn by Ariel Olivetti.

== Fictional species biography ==
At the beginning of the Kree-Skrull War, millions of years ago in Earth time, the alien Kree established a station on the planet Uranus, a strategic position between the Kree and Skrull empires. Through their work at this station, they discovered that sentient life on nearby Earth had genetic potential invested in it by the alien Celestials. Intrigued, the Kree began to experiment on Earth's then-primitive race Homo sapiens to produce the genetically advanced Inhuman race. Their goal was apparently twofold—to investigate possible ways of circumventing their own evolutionary stagnation, and to create a powerful mutant race of soldiers for use against the Skrulls. Although their experiments were successful in creating a strain of humanity with extraordinary abilities, the Kree abandoned their experiment because a genetic prophecy had predicted that the experiments would eventually lead to an anomaly who would destroy the Kree Supreme Intelligence.

Born approximately 50,000 BC, Tuk the Caveboy was the first offspring of the Inhumans.

The Inhumans went on to form a society of their own, which thrived in seclusion from the rest of humanity and developed advanced technology. Experiments with the mutagenic Terrigen Mist (a process known as Terrigenesis) gave them various powers, but caused lasting genetic damage and deformities, which led to a long-term selective breeding program in an attempt to mitigate the effects of these mutations. The Terrigen Mist is a natural mutagen, arising as a vapor from the Terrigen Crystals, which are able to alter Inhuman biology. The Mists were discovered by the Inhuman geneticist Randac approximately 25,000 years ago. He immersed himself in the Mists and gained mental powers comparable to the Eternals. After centuries of eugenics and birth control, the Inhumans managed to mitigate the genetic damage and cultivated a more responsible use of Terrigen Mist. The practice they developed was to let only genetically perfect specimens undergo the random mutations provoked by the Mists. Their theory was that genetic screening could avoid the risk of hideous and animal mutations in an individual. However, there are examples throughout the Inhumans' canon where an exposed Inhuman became a devolved, sometimes mindless, evolutionarily inferior throw-back. The term Alpha Primitives was coined for these unfortunate outcasts of Inhuman society, who would for centuries become the breeding stock of a slave race. Resentment at this caste system sometimes bubbles up, and the Alpha Primitives have tried to overthrow their rulers in multiple storylines, often as a result of manipulation by a third party.

Attilan's society and culture are predicated on a conformist belief system that permits individuality as it applies to genetic development and physical and mental ability, but demands rigid conformity in that each member of society is assigned a place within that society according to those abilities following exposure to Terrigen Mist. Once assigned, no Inhuman, no matter how great or powerful, can change his or her place within this rigid caste system. However, as an exception, a member of the Royal Family, Crystal, married outside the Inhuman race to the mutant Quicksilver.

The Inhumans are led by their king, Black Bolt, and his Royal Family, consisting of Medusa, Karnak, Gorgon, Triton, Crystal, Maximus, and the canine Lockjaw. Both Crystal and Medusa have been members of the Fantastic Four; Crystal has been a member of the Avengers as well.

Black Bolt has guided the Inhumans through some of the most turbulent times in their history, including several attempts by Maximus to usurp the throne, revolts by the worker class (with their eventual emancipation), attacks by human renegades, the kidnapping of Medusa, the destruction and rebuilding of Attilan, and the revelation of the Inhumans' existence to humanity.

His role as king of the Inhumans has been tumultuous. The first major crisis occurred when he and Medusa conceived a child. Medusa bore the child in defiance of the Genetic Council, who felt that Black Bolt's bloodline was too dangerous to pass on. The Council nonetheless took the child to examine and forbade parental contact. Medusa escaped to Earth with members of the royal family only to be harassed by Maximus. Black Bolt was torn between his love of family and his duty to respect the Genetic Council, and it was only when the council was revealed to be using his son in a plot against him that he finally turned against the council. With that, he gave up the crown as king of the Inhumans. For a while, they lived away from Attilan, but returned in times of need.

The once-secret existence of the race has come to light among the general public as the Inhumans interact more often with many of Earth's superheroes—including the Fantastic Four, the Avengers, and the X-Men—whom they have aided against threats such as Doctor Doom, Ultron 7, Magneto, and Apocalypse. However, no one came to the Inhumans' aid when an army of Portuguese mercenaries attacked Attilan, which was now located on risen Atlantean ruins. This was actually a coup-d'etat orchestrated by Black Bolt's brother Maximus.

Inhuman society changed radically when Ronan the Accuser sought to use the Inhumans as an army to disrupt the Shi'ar control of the Kree after their defeat in the Kree-Shi'ar War. Appearing over the city of Attilan, Ronan seized control in a surprise attack and forced the Inhumans and their king, Black Bolt, to obey, or he would destroy their only home and everyone in it. He also exiled Maximus and the Alpha Primitives to the Negative Zone. During their time in forced servitude, Ronan revealed that the Inhumans had always been intended as weapons in service to the Kree. To this end, much of the genetic attributes that were encoded in them during the original experiments were meant to give them the abilities and appearances of various alien races, the idea being that these Inhuman slaves could be used to infiltrate alien worlds and races to conduct espionage or assassinations to weaken potential conquests. Ronan used the Inhumans to launch attacks on ships and bases, disrupt a treaty between the Shi'ar and Spartax, and manipulate Black Bolt to assassinate Empress Lilandra.

Eventually, Black Bolt sought to free his people by challenging Ronan to a personal battle. If Ronan won, the Inhumans would continue to serve him. If the king won, the Inhumans would go free. After a terrible battle, Black Bolt won and Ronan, demonstrating that the Kree still had honor, kept his word and left the Inhumans. All was not over, as the Inhumans were not willing to just follow Black Bolt back to Earth. Pressure had been building in the closed society of Attilan since open contact with the outside world had been made. During their enslavement by Ronan, the Inhumans had wished for their freedom, but had developed a sense of pride in their power and a belief in their own destiny. They no longer believed that Black Bolt or the Royal Family was fit to lead them in the new life they wanted, and they exiled the Royal Family from Attilan. The Royal Family returned to Earth to find their destiny. After suffering bigotry while living in the Baxter Building with the Fantastic Four and turning down political asylum from Latveria by Dr. Doom, the royal family returned to Attilan, which was located on the Blue Area of the Moon. The Inhumans attempted to foster better relations with Earth by sending students to the University of Wisconsin.

=== Son of M ===
In the events of Son of M, Quicksilver stole Terrigen Crystals in an attempt to regain his powers and cure the de-powered mutants from M-Day. The theft led to a conflict on Genosha between the re-powered mutants (whose powers came back as too powerful for their own good causing their eventual surrender), the Inhumans, and the U.S. Office of National Emergency (ONE). The conflict ended with ONE confiscating the Terrigen Crystals, an act that incited Black Bolt to verbally declare war on the United States.

=== Silent War ===
In January 2007, the miniseries Silent War began, with Gorgon launching a first strike on New York. Although the Inhumans do manage to recover the crystals, the episode ends with Maximus again taking control of Attilan. The mini series ends on a cliffhanger, with the destruction of Atilian (foreshadowed in Son of M) and Maximus having taken control over the Inhumans using his psychic power, leaving only Luna and Black Bolt (imprisoned in a cell while Luna feigns support for Maximus for her own safety) free from his control and Maximus vowing that the Inhumans will enslave Earth in retaliation for their destruction of Atilian.

=== New Avengers: Illuminati ===
It has been revealed that Black Bolt has been replaced by a Skrull impostor, in a time frame after Silent War, but before World War Hulk. The impostor revealed himself to the Illuminati and was killed after a failed attempt to assassinate the heroes.

The series, along with Planet Hulk and World War Hulk, and subsequent mini-series Secret Invasion outright ignore the events of Silent War and its status quo

=== Secret Invasion: Inhumans ===
Written by Heroes writer Joe Pokaski, this story digs into how the Inhuman Royal Family deals with the news that the Black Bolt had been replaced by a Skrull impostor. The Skrulls attack Attilan while Black Bolt is revealed to be a prisoner of the Skrulls, who intend to use his voice as a weapon of mass destruction. The Inhuman Royal Family defeated several Skrull soldiers and took a Skrull ship with the point of taking the war to the Skrulls and save Black Bolt. With some help from the Kree, they rescue Black Bolt and return to Attilan. The story itself ignores the ending of Silent War, with Medusa being under Maximus's mental thrall, Atilan's destruction, and Maximus having seized control over the Inhuman population via his mental powers save for Black Bolt and Luna (who are immune to his telepathy).

=== Dark Reign ===
The Inhuman Royal Family confronts the Unspoken, a cousin of Black Bolt.

=== War of Kings ===
Finally deciding that they will no longer be used and abused by other races, the Inhumans take drastic action to ensure their survival as a race. To that end, they activate a series of long dormant machines beneath the city of Attilan, transforming it into a gigantic starship, powered by Black Bolt's voice. Breaking free from its resting place on the Moon, Attilan enters hyperspace and tracks down the remnants of the Skrull Armada, completely eradicating it. As Attilan enters Shi'ar space, it attracts the attention of three Shi'ar warships, who order them to depart or they will open fire. They too are destroyed without mercy.

Attilan reaches the planet Hala, destroying the protective shield that guards their weakened empire and enter the planet itself. The Royal Family confronts Ronan the Accuser, who is serving as king. He admitted he felt that he was just holding the spot of ruler for their true king, Black Bolt, but Black Bolt declined the seat of king.

=== Realm of Kings ===
The T-Bomb has killed Black Bolt, leaving leadership to Queen Medusa. The Inhuman Royal Family struggles to maintain their grip on the Kree Empire. The Alpha Primitives revolt, Maximus tries to take the throne, and the Kree aristocracy revolts, which erodes the Inhumans' rule.

=== Universal Inhumans ===
Back on Earth, the Fantastic Four encounter an interstellar group of Inhumans formed from the Centaurians, the Dire Wraiths, the Kymellians, and the Badoon. These new Inhumans reveal that the Kree experimented on other interstellar races, aside from humans, and used methods other than the Terrigen Mists. The resulting Universal Inhumans have banded together and traveled to Earth in search of Black Bolt, who they believe will lead their collective people in an eventual takeover of Earth. When Black Bolt returned, the Universal Inhumans arrive on Earth's moon where a prophecy revolving around a Midnight King rising from the Inhuman Program and bringing an end to the Kree is revealed. Together they go to Earth to defeat the four Reeds from the Interdimensional Council.

Meanwhile, the resurrected Supreme Intelligence orders the Kree to launch an attack to destroy the Earth and the Inhumans in a bid to prevent the genetic prophecy from occurring unaware that by doing that he actually put the prophecy in motion. They are repelled, with the Inhumans in pursuit.

=== Infinity ===
During the events of Infinity, Thanos and his forces attack Attilan and offer to spare the city in exchange for a tribute: the deaths of all Inhumans between the ages of 16 and 22. Black Bolt surmises that the offering is a ruse to hide the fact that Thanos actually desires the death of Thane, a half-Inhuman youth Thanos had fathered years earlier. Maximus had Eldrac transport the remaining Inhumans to different locations to keep them from being killed by Thanos. The search for Thane eventually reveals that secret Inhuman tribes have existed on Earth for years and mated with its population, producing a number of seemingly-normal humans who possess dormant Inhuman genes. In response to Thanos' threat, Black Bolt and Maximus evacuate Attilan before destroying it as a show of defiance. The destruction of the city activates the Terrigenisis Bomb, a creation of Maximus, which spreads Terrigen Mist across Earth and activates the powers of numerous unsuspecting humans who were Inhuman descendants.

=== Inhumanity ===
During the Inhumanity storyline, Karnak was left mentally scarred by said events and begun destroying the upper west side of Manhattan, babbling and sobbing uncontrollably. He was taken into custody by the Avengers. In Stark Tower, Karnak explained to the Avengers what happened during their fight with Thanos and what it meant for the Inhumans. When he was questioning himself for the reason for Black Bolt to spread Terrigen Mist and what would happen next, Karnak had an epiphany in which he finally saw "the fault in all things". He told Medusa who was present during his interrogation that she needed to forget everything she thought she knew, ignore the instincts, and forget the past. Otherwise, all would be lost. Following this revelation in which he stated it was too late for him to unlearn a lifetime of error, Karnak shattered the window from his containment cell and jumped out of Stark Tower, killing himself.

It was later revealed that there is another Inhuman city called Orollan which is located somewhere in Greenland. The Inhuman Lash is from Orollan as he plans to recruit the Inhuman descendants to work for him. As the months pass, Medusa also begins gathering the Inhuman descendants (called NuHumans by many), and reveals the existence of the Inhumans to the world. Attilan is rebuilt from its remains on the Hudson River, in a city called New Attilan, serving as an independent nation welcoming all Inhumans and open to any who wish to visit.

Crystal takes a team of Inhumans on the transport vessel called the R.I.V., or Royal Inhumans Vehicle, to follow the Terrigen Cloud and protect any NuHumans. In Australia she finds a skinhead Inhuman with skin-changing powers and a healer named Panacea. Her team visits the hermit kingdom of Sin-Cong to explore why there have been no NuHumans in that country. Her team then investigates mysterious "skypears" that landed around the globe. They investigate a skyspear in China, but are met with suspicion by the Collective Man and the People's Defense Force. The skyspear attacks the Inhumans and the People's Defense Force, temporarily de-powering the Collective Man. Flint, unaware he is de-powered, nearly kills him with a rock attack, which traumatizes Flint. Crystal decides to leave China and travel to Africa with Ana Kravinoff as their guide to find Flint's family in the Chimanimani Mountains of Mozambique, Africa in the hidden Inhuman city of Utolan. Upon their return to Attilan, Panacea empathizes with Gorgon's suffering and heals his paralysis as practice before she tries her abilities on his comatose son.

=== Civil War II ===
The Terrigen Cloud sweeps over Ohio and transforms two Ohio State University students named Ulysses Cain and Michelle into Inhumans. While Michelle emerged as a red-skinned beast with wings and a tail, Ulysses emerges unchanged but with the ability of precognition. Iron Man later infiltrated New Attilan to claim Ulysses after fighting off Medusa, Crystal, and Karnak. This leads the Inhumans to head to Stark Tower to reclaim Ulysses which leads to the Avengers, the Ultimates, and S.H.I.E.L.D. to get involved. When Ulysses projects his latest vision that shows a rampaging Hulk standing over the corpses of the superheroes, this causes the younger Inhumans present to cry.

=== Inhumans vs. X-Men ===
Beast works with Iso to find a way to counter the Terrigen Cloud as Medusa tells the Inhuman Royal Family to be prepared just in case the X-Men take action against them as the Terrigen Cloud becomes saturated. When the shrinking of the Terrigen Cloud threatens to render Earth inhospitable for mutants, Emma Frost, Magneto, and Storm make plans to destroy the Terrigen Cloud. Beast heads back to Attilan to speak to the Royal Family, only for Emma Frost to go ahead with the attack. The X-Men take out most of the Inhuman Royal Family and trap them in Limbo. After hearing from Iso about why the X-Men want to destroy the Terrigen Cloud, Medusa is the one who destroys the Terrigen Cloud. Medusa abdicates the throne and gives all leadership duties to Iso, knowing that her people will not understand why she destroyed the remaining Terrigen Cloud. Now free of the burdens of being a queen, Medusa happily reunites with Black Bolt in the Quiet Room.

=== Encounter with the Progenitors ===
Medusa banishes Maximus into an inter-dimensional prison, then with Crystal, Black Bolt, Flint, Gorgon, and Captain Swain are guided by Noh-Varr to the former Kree throne-world of Hala to discover the origins of Terrigen and offer a future to their doomed people. During the trip they learn Maximus and Black Bolt had switched bodies, so Black Bolt was actually banished. To further complicate matters, Medusa runs her hand through her powerful hair only to pull a large clump out with it, forcing her to announce to her crew that she is dying. It is soon apparent that Medusa's decision to destroy the Terrigen Cloud is afflicting her. She did what she had to save the mutant race, but in doing so she had doomed the future of her people. Because Medusa had pressed the button, that act had the consequence of gradually draining the life energies from her. Akin to dying of a broken heart, Medusa had acted to end a cultural heritage that had lasted millennia and her body has essentially chosen to end with it. Her only hope now is to find the secrets of Terrigen and bring a new source of it back to their people, so she too can be revitalized.

The Inhumans and Noh-Varr discover info on the Primagen which was used by the Progenitors to create the Kree and what the Terrigen derives from. When the Inhumans obtain the Primagen from the Progenitors' World Farm and Gorgon buys his fellow Inhumans time to get away, Maximus takes a sample of the Primagen and has a vision where the Progenitors attack Earth in retaliation for the theft of the Primagen. While on the Astral Plane with Black Bolt, Medusa and Black Bolt agreed to continue as partners and not lovers. When Medusa takes the Primagen, it restores her hair and health while also causing a backlash in the attacking Progenitor to destroy the approaching Progenitors causing the Ordinator-Class Progenitors that saw the attack from the World Farm to spare Earth from their invasion.

=== Death of the Inhumans ===
When Karnak is sent to the Kree to relay a message from Black Bolt to them, the Kree Commander explains how they dispatched Ronan the Accuser as leader of the Kree after Hala was placed in ruin by Mister Knife and have begun to forge a new life. When asked to kneel, Karnak does not. Instead, he does his best to fend off Vox only for the Super-Inhuman to subdue Karnak. As Black Bolt arrives, he walks through the halls of the Kree base speaking every name of the fallen Inhumans, making it a song about death. Eventually, it comes down to just Black Bolt and Vox, who is holding Karnak as a shield. Black Bolt signs to Karnak to have Vox take him instead. Vox apparently accepts the change as he teleports himself behind Black Bolt. Before Karnak's very eyes, Vox slits Black Bolt's throat.

The Kree take Black Bolt prisoner and repair the damage done to his throat without using any sedatives or anesthesia to dull the pain which prompted them to think that Black Bolt's great power is gone when he does not scream and therefore the prophecy about the Midnight King is no longer a threat to the Kree. However while being transported, it turns out that he still has his voice, but it is faint. After killing several Kree, Black Bolt secures a firearm and finds Ronan the Accuser alive. However, he is a prisoner of Vox and having been experimented on alongside the Kree soldiers that are loyal to Ronan. Black Bolt learns of this when he sees that Ronan has been converted to a cyborg. At Ronan's request, Black Bolt enables him a mercy killing by whispering "You are forgiven." Elsewhere, Medusa and the surviving Inhuman Royal Family members try to recruit Beta Ray Bill in their fight against Vox and the Kree.

The Inhuman Royal Family are finally taking the battle to the Kree and arrive just in time to save Black Bolt from Vox. Thanks to the interference of Beta Ray Bill, the Inhuman Royal Family are able to overpower and kill Vox, but not before he is apparently able to kill Crystal. They soon realize to their surprise that Vox was actually Maximus in disguise concluding that the Super-Inhuman is not a person. Instead, it is a program and it is also revealed that the voice power that everyone assumes is vaporizing his targets was actually just teleporting them instead as it was seen after Crystal's apparent death, she has been transported to an unknown place where Kree scientists are experimenting on the Inhuman victims who were supposedly killed. While Lockjaw is not seen, Triton appears to be in some kind of stasis tank alongside Naja, Sterilon, and other unnamed Inhumans. Crystal is now doomed to be the next Vox.

Meeting up with the Inhuman Royal Family and Beta Ray Bill, Black Bolt is told by Karnak of Vox being a program that transported his "victims" to the Kree. With the Kree planning to turn any captive Inhumans into Vox, Karnak states that not all of them will be rescued. As Black Bolt has one more scream left, Karnak tells him to make it count. Using his sign language, Black Bolt addresses the others on how he has made mistakes in the past and apologizes to them. After holding a moment of silence, Black Bolt orders Gorgon to turn around. The Inhuman ship strikes the Kree's base. Vox then pushes a button to unleash the Vox-controlled Inhumans. As Gorgon and Beta Ray Bill engage the Kree soldiers, Black Bolt, Medusa and Karnak arrive at the laboratory where they find Vox-controlled Inhumans like Crystal and Lockjaw. Using a laser, Black Bolt clears the Vox-controlled Crystal and Lockjaw just because they were in his way. Entering one door, Black Bolt signs "I love you. I'm sorry" before whispering for them to run. As Medusa and Karnak fight the Vox-controlled Crystal and Lockjaw, Black Bolt confronts other Vox-controlled Inhumans like Triton. With what little remained of his power, Black Bolt destroyed the engines responsible for transmitting the Vox program, killing all the Inhumans there and robbing the Kree of their plans. Gorgon and Beta Ray Bill arrive stating that the Kree have fled and see Crystal and Lockjaw still alive, having been freed from the Vox-control when the engines were destroyed. Black Bolt emerges from the room as Medusa orders Lockjaw to take them away from the Kree base. When Crystal asks where they should go, Black Bolt uses his sign language to say "Home." Lockjaw then teleports them away. Beta Ray Bill would later confirm that the Royals were the last of the Inhumans, though there are still a few Inhumans active on Earth.

=== Imperial ===
The Inhumans are returning as a major force after a period of relative obscurity in the "Imperial" storyline. Maximus and Black Bolt are revealed as the instigators of a recent interstellar crisis. Maximus uses his genius to manipulate the Elder of the Universe, Grandmaster into playing a dangerous game, but it turns out the Grandmaster was merely a pawn in a larger scheme orchestrated by Black Bolt to restore Inhuman glory. After their part is done, Black Bolt and Medusa tell Maximus that he no longer welcomed in the Inhuman Royal Family. Maximus storms off ranting about different things and that Black Bolt will one day need him again.

== Powers and abilities ==
Even without using the Terrigen Mist, the Kree modifications, combined with centuries of selective breeding, have given all Inhumans certain advantages. Their average lifespan is 150 years. An Inhuman in good physical condition possesses superhuman attributes, such as superhuman strength, reaction time, speed, and endurance greater than the finest of human athletes. Karnak and other normal Inhumans who are in excellent physical shape can lift one ton and are physically slightly superior to the peak of normal human physical achievement. Exposure to Terrigen Mist can both enhance and in some cases reduce these physical capabilities. Most Inhumans are used to living in a pollution-free, germ-free environment and have difficulty tolerating Earth's current level of air and water pollution for any length of time.

== Known Inhumans ==
=== Alpha Primitives ===
The Alpha Primitives are a humanoid slave race created by the Inhumans, first appearing in Fantastic Four #47 (February 1966). Because of the Inhumans' low population, they created a labor force of hominids bred to be strong, but of limited intelligence. They were also rendered unable to breed and were only produced only by cloning.

The scheming usurper Maximus once tried to use the Alpha Primitives in his schemes, mutating three of the creatures into malevolent beings of pure mental energy known as the Trykon, but they were defeated and banished into the Negative Zone.

Maximus later tried to use the latent guilt most Inhumans felt about the Alphas in one of his many plots to overthrow the royal family of Attilan, utilizing Omega, but the guilt was abolished when the Inhumans' ruler Black Bolt declared the Alpha Primitives free. The Alphas would no longer be cloned, and those already made would be allowed to live out their lives in a preserve under the city proper.

The remaining Alpha Primitives live quietly in their preserve, many still mindlessly performing the jobs for which they were trained. At one point, the Inhumans Karnak and Gorgon are revealed and punished for advocating the continued use of the Primitives as slaves. After some time, it was understood that the Alpha Primitives could not live on their own and the previous arrangement was reversed.

The Unspoken, the former king of the Inhumans, revealed that the Alpha Primitives are actually humans who have been exposed to gas created from Xerogen Crystals, a substance created by the Kree as a weapon for the Inhumans to use against their human enemies.

=== Bird People ===
The Bird People are a genetic offshoot of the Inhumans with bird-like wings. Some members of the Bird People have bat-like wings.

=== Super-Inhumans ===
When Vox is defeated or killed, another selected Inhuman would be activated and transformed into Vox.

== Reception ==
=== Critical response ===
Richard Fink of MovieWeb included the Inhumans in their "Superhero Characters Who Need Their Own Animated TV Shows" list. Comic Book Resources ranked the Inhuman Royal Family 4th in their "Marvel: 10 Most Powerful Teams" list, 8th in their "Marvel: The 10 Strongest Superhero Teams" list, and 10th in their "10 Most Fashionable Teams In Marvel Comics" list. Jeremy Brown ranked the Inhumans 8th in their "Marvel: Best Superhero Teams" list.

== Other versions ==
=== Earth X ===
The Inhuman origin is retold during the prologue of Earth X and the Royal family is reimagined, with Medusa having a much bolder hairline and Blackbolt with his mouth bolted shut.

=== Heroes Reborn ===
In this alternate reality created by Franklin Richards, the Inhumans are mostly the same. They live on Earth, in Attilan. The biggest difference is the reverence they hold, shown in statues, for Galactus and the multitude of heralds who operate for him simultaneously. Terrigen Mist is not completely under their control, coming from a crack in the ground. Their ultimate origins are unknown, but Maximus escapes in the caverns deep beneath the city to locate it. Here, it is discovered their city holds connections to other areas of the world, such as Mole Man's Monster Isle.

=== House of M ===
Black Bolt appears as an ally of Black Panther. The other Inhumans were present at the meeting between Black Bolt, Professor X, and Magneto.

=== Squadron Supreme ===
In the original Squadron Supreme universe, Power Princess's people the Utopians are the equivalent of the Inhumans.

=== Ultimate Marvel ===
The Inhumans made their debut in the Ultimate Marvel Universe in Ultimate Fantastic Four Annual No. 1 (2005). It begins with two mountain climbers reached the walls of their city, Attilan, in the Himalayas when they are turned back with their memories erased. The Inhumans made themselves known to the Fantastic Four when a member of their royalty, Crystal, fled to New York after being ordered to marry Black Bolt's brother Maximus. Johnny came across Crystal and attempted to save her from two royal guards from Attilan who were trying to capture her. Beaten, Crystal took him back to the Baxter Building, and revealed herself to the Fantastic Four. She left behind her dog Lockjaw, who had the ability to teleport the Fantastic Four to Attilan. Once their presence was discovered, the city was stripped of its advanced technology and destroyed by Black Bolt, and the Inhumans, including Crystal, relocated. They are hinted to have relocated to the Moon.

The Ultimate Marvel version of Attilan is quite different in appearance from the Marvel Universe version, like a giant wasp's nest crossed with a Gothic cathedral. Ultimate Crystal, Lockjaw, and Black Bolt are similar to their counterparts; Medusa is depicted as having actual snakes for hair, like her mythical namesake. Gorgon is female, Karnak projects energy blasts (though he can still sense weaknesses and pressure points), Triton has a more squid-like appearance, and Maximus is a somewhat effete courtier, whom Crystal describes as "preening" and a "peacock". Other Inhumans shown include Tri-clops, with clairvoyant vision (including the power to see the invisible), Densitor (Maximus' flunky, who can presumably increase his strength, durability and mass, enough to become fireproof) and an unnamed Inhuman who can produce a swarm of insect-like flying creatures from his body. They claimed that their city had remained secret for 10,000 years, which makes their ancestors contemporaries with Ultimate Marvel's Atlantis.

=== Amalgam Comics ===
The Un-People are a superhero group in the Amalgam Comics universe. They are a combination of DC Comics' Forever People and Marvel Comics' Inhumans.

=== Inhumans 2099 ===
In the 2004 Marvel Knights Inhumans 2099 one-shot written by Robert Kirkman, which took place in the future on an alternate world (Earth-2992) that was not identical to the alternate Marvel Universe on Earth-928 featured in the 1990s Marvel 2099 books, the Inhumans leave Earth's moon and are forced to live aboard a spaceship after the Mutant Registration Act is passed. After leaving, Black Bolt places himself and his closest confidants (Triton, Gorgon, Karnak, Crystal, and Medusa) in cryogenic stasis and, in his absence, his brother Maximus takes over as leader of the Inhumans living aboard the spacecraft. While in control, Maximus kills Black Bolt's confidants in their sleep. Fifty years later, Black Bolt is released from cryogenic stasis to find that Maximus has killed those closest to him. In retaliation, he breaks his vow of silence and destroys the Inhumans' spacecraft, killing all aboard, including himself.

== In other media ==
=== Television ===
- The Inhumans made their animation debut in the 1978 Fantastic Four episode "Medusa and the Inhumans". In this continuity, Medusa is the leader instead of Black Bolt, though he does make a brief appearance as an unnamed Inhuman. Medusa wants to take over the human race from her Himalayan base, and brainwashes the Thing into attacking H.E.R.B.I.E. and the Fantastic Four until the former causes him to trip and regain his memories. As they escape, Gorgon creates an earthquake, but Reed Richards puts him on a hanger so he cannot use his seismic powers. Karnak attacks their ship, but Sue Storm makes his arm invisible, causing him to run off in panic. The Fantastic Four are eventually confronted by Medusa and show her a projection showing the banality of human life. The Inhumans decide it is not worth conquering the humans and let the Fantastic Four free.
- The Inhumans appear in the 1994 Fantastic Four series, first appearing in the three-part season two episode "Inhumans Saga" before becoming a sub-plot for the rest of the season. Their creation at the hands of the Kree remains intact in this series. After Maximus erases her memory, an amnesiac Medusa teams up with the Frightful Four to brainwash the Thing into killing the Fantastic Four. However, Gorgon rescues Medusa. Following this, Johnny Storm finds Crystal, Karnak, and Lockjaw and brings his team to face off with the Inhumans. Black Bolt soon arrives and overpowers the Thing, but is weakened by Earth's atmosphere. The Seeker kidnaps Triton and uses him to lure in the Inhumans, vowing to kill Triton unless Medusa marries him. Reed Richards tracks down Attilan and helps the royal family regain the throne. In a last ditch attempt, Maximus creates an impenetrable force field around Attilan, though the Fantastic Four escape. Johnny Storm and Crystal are separated and mourn each other, as they have developed feelings for each other. In "The Sentry Sinister", Black Bolt then used his voice to free them all but it destroyed their city. Crystal then joined the Fantastic Four to be with Johnny.
- The Inhumans appear in Hulk and the Agents of S.M.A.S.H.. Introduced in the first-season episode "Inhuman Nature", the Inhumans make a subsequent appearance in the series finale "Planet Monster".
- The Inhumans appear in Ultimate Spider-Man. Introduced in the third-season episode "Inhumanity", the Inhumans make a further appearance in the fourth-season episode "Agent Web", with Triton appearing as a recurring character.
- The Inhumans and the Alpha Primitives appear in the Guardians of the Galaxy episode "Crystal Blue Persuasion". The titular team end up on Attilan after Lockjaw brings them there to assist in stopping a "Terrigen Plague" spreading throughout the city. Maximus seemingly creates a cure, but brainwashes Black Bolt via a mind control helmet and swears the Inhumans' allegiance to the Kree when Ronan the Accuser arrives as part of a deal they had previously made. However, Ronan reneges and proceeds to destroy Attilan as well as confiscate Maximus' helmet so he can have Black Bolt order Lockjaw to teleport him and Star-Lord to the caverns beneath Attilan to destroy it from below. Star-Lord successfully cures the Terrigen Plague and frees Black Bolt, allowing the latter to cripple Ronan's ship. In "Inhuman Touch", the Guardians visit the Inhumans on Attilan where Star-Lord has gotten approval of Black Bolt to interrogate Maximus about the location of the Cosmic Seed, until he plans to escape from his cell to control it and destroy any nearby planets.
- The Inhumans appear in Avengers Assemble. They are introduced and featured prominently in the third season, where Ultron attempts to control the Inhumans in a bid to destroy humanity.
- The Inhumans feature prominently in the second season of Marvel Future Avengers. During the show's events, an outbreak of Terrigen Mist on Earth causes several humans to develop newfound powers, with the Avengers and Future Avengers working to determine the cause of the outbreak while attempting to prevent Earth from going to war with the Inhumans.
- The Inhumans starred in an eponymous ABC series in 2017, featuring the Royal Family and formerly planned as a feature film. The species was first introduced in the television series Agents of S.H.I.E.L.D. The Inhumans series premiered in IMAX theaters, was met with negative reviews and was cancelled after one season.
- A Marvel Animation motion comic DVD was released on April 23, 2013, based on Paul Jenkins and Jae Lee's Inhumans vol. 2 #1–12

=== Film ===
Screenwriter Don Payne was interested in working with more Fantastic Four characters like the Inhumans in a possible third and fourth installment of the Fantastic Four film series directed by Tim Story. However, the franchise rebooted in 2015.

=== Marvel Cinematic Universe ===
The Inhumans are introduced in the second season of Agents of S.H.I.E.L.D., with further development in the third season. In this continuity, the Kree's experiments with the Inhumans date back to the Maya civilization when a Mayan hunter was turned into Hive. Black Bolt later appears in the 2022 film Doctor Strange in the Multiverse of Madness.

=== Video games ===
- The Inhumans appear in Marvel: Ultimate Alliance. They offer the heroes Attilan as a temporary headquarters after Doctor Doom acquires Odin's powers and uses them to reshape Earth. After Medusa is corrupted by Doom, Triton, Crystal, and Gorgon go to Earth to fight him and are not heard from for the rest of the game. Vision later states that they may have been "inducted into Doom's army".
- Black Bolt, Medusa, Gorgon, Karnak, Crystal, and Thane appear as unlockable playable characters in Marvel: Avengers Alliance.
- Black Bolt, Medusa, Crystal, Karnak, Gorgon, Maximus, Daisy Johnson, Kamala Khan, Lash, Moon Girl, Kid Kaiju, Inferno, and Lincoln Campbell appear as unlockable playable characters in Marvel: Future Fight.
- Black Bolt, Medusa, Daisy Johnson, Kamala Khan, Karnak, Crystal, and Lockjaw appear as playable characters in Marvel Puzzle Quest.
- Inhumans appear as playable character on Marvel Heroes.
- The Inhuman Royal Family appear as playable characters in Lego Marvel Super Heroes 2. When Kang the Conqueror uses Attilan as a component of Chronopolis, Black Bolt, Medusa, Crystal, Triton, and Lockjaw fight Maximus when he allies himself with the Kree to target Kang after Black Bolt failed to prevent Attilan from being taken. Gorgon and Karnak also appear in Attilan to give side missions to the players.
- Black Bolt, Crystal, and Lockjaw appear as playable characters in Marvel Powers United VR.
- Crystal and Kamala Khan appear as playable characters in Marvel Ultimate Alliance 3: The Black Order while Black Bolt, Medusa, Gorgon, and Lockjaw appear as non-playable characters.
- The Inhumans appear in Marvel's Avengers. These versions are humans who developed superpowers in the aftermath of the destruction of the Avengers' Helicarrier, which was powered by a Terrigen Crystal. Five years after the incident, Inhumans are hunted by A.I.M., who attempt to develop a cure for what they call the "Inhuman Disease", and are forced to hide their abilities, though some are willing to fight against A.I.M. and form underground resistances. After failing to develop the Inhuman cure, MODOK, an Inhuman himself who was driven insane by his mutation, plots to destroy all Inhumans and superheroes across the globe, but is defeated by the Avengers.

== Collected editions ==
=== Trade paperbacks ===
Title	Material collected	Publication date	ISBN
The Origin of the Inhumans	Fantastic Four (1961) No. 36, 38, 41–47, 62–65 and material from No. 48, 50, 51, 52, 54–61, Fantastic Four Annual (1963) No. 5, Thor (1966) #146–152 and Not Brand Echh (1967) No. 6	October 2013	0-7851-8497-X
Inhumans: Beware the Inhumans	Marvel Super-Heroes (1967) #15; Incredible Hulk Annual (1968) #1; Fantastic Four (1961) #81–83, 99; Amazing Adventures (1970) #1–10; Avengers (1963) No. 95 and material from Fantastic Four (1961) No. 95, 105; Not Brand Echh (1967) No. 12	January 2018	978-1302910815
Inhumans	Inhumans vol. 2 #1–12	August 2000	0-7851-0753-3
Fantastic Four/Inhumans	Inhumans vol. 3 #1–4; Fantastic Four vol. 3 #51–54	July 2007	0-7851-2703-8
Inhumans: Culture Shock	Inhumans vol. 4 #1–6 (digest size)	March 2005	0-7851-1755-5
Young Inhumans	Inhumans vol. 4 #1–12	September 2008	0-7851-3382-8
Decimation: Son of M	Son of M #1–6	September 2006	0-7851-1970-1
Silent War	Silent War #1–6	October 2007	0-7851-2425-X
Secret Invasion: Inhumans	Secret Invasion: Inhumans #1–4; Thor #146–147	March 2009	0-7851-3248-1
War of Kings: Road to War of Kings	Secret Invasion: War of Kings; War of Kings Saga; X-Men: Divided We Stand #2; X-Men: Kingbreaker #1–4	May 2009	0-7851-3967-2
War of Kings	War of Kings #1–6	November 2009	0-7851-3542-1
Realm of Kings	Realm of Kings one-shot, Realm of Kings: Inhumans #1–5, Realm of Kings: Son of Hulk #1–4, and Realm of Kings: Imperial Guard #1–5	August 2010	0-7851-4809-4
Inhumans: By Right of Birth	Marvel Graphic Novel: The Inhumans; Inhumans: The Untold Saga	November 2013	0-7851-8504-6
Fantastic Four/Inhumans: Atlantis Rising	Namor the Sub-Mariner #60–62, Fantastic Four: Atlantis Rising #1–2, Fantastic Force (1994) #8–9, Fantastic Four (1961) #401–402, Fantastic Four Unlimited #11	January 2014	978-0-7851-8548-2
Inhuman Vol. 1: Genesis	Inhuman #1–6	December 2014	978-0785185772
Inhuman Vol. 2: Axis	Inhuman #7–11	May 2015	978-0785187806
Inhuman Vol. 3: Lineage	Inhuman #12–14, Inhuman Annual No. 1	August 2015	978-0785198048
Battleworld – Inhumans: Attilan Rising	Inhumans: Attilan Rising #1–5	February 2016	978-0785198758
Uncanny Inhumans Volume 1: Time Crush	Uncanny Inhumans #0–4; FCBD 2015: Inhumans Story	April 2016	978-0785197065
Uncanny Inhumans Volume 2: The Quiet Room	Uncanny Inhumans #5–9	August 2016	978-0785197072
Uncanny Inhumans Volume 3: Civil War II	Uncanny Inhumans #11–13	November 2016	978-0785199915
Uncanny Inhumans Vol. 4: IvX	Uncanny Inhumans #15–20	June 2017	978-1302903121
All-New Inhumans Volume 1: Global Outreach	All-New Inhumans #1–4, All-New, All-Different Point One No. 1 (Inhumans story)	May 2016	978-0785196389
All-New Inhumans Volume 2: Skyspears	All-New Inhumans #5–9	November 2016	978-0785196396
Royals Vol. 1: Beyond Inhuman	Royals #1–5, Inhumans Prime No. 1	October 2017	978-1302906948
Royals Vol. 2: Judgment Day	Royals #6–12	February 2018	978-1302906955
Inhumans: Once and Future Kings	Inhumans: Once and Future Kings #1–5	February 2018	978-1302909406
Death of the Inhumans	Death of the Inhumans #1–5	January 2019	978-1302913007

=== Hardcovers ===
Title	Material collected	Publication date	ISBN
Marvel Masterworks: Inhumans Vol. 1	Thor #146–152; Amazing Adventures #1–10; Avengers #95; Marvel Super-Heroes No. 15	October 2009	978-0-7851-4141-9
Marvel Masterworks: Inhumans Vol. 2	Inhumans vol. 1 #1–12; Captain Marvel #52–53; Fantastic Four Annual #12; Marvel Fanfare #14; What If? #29–30; Thor Annual No. 12	April 2010	978-0-7851-4151-8
Inhumans by Paul Jenkins & Jae Lee	Inhumans vol. 2 #1–12	September 2013	978-0785184744
Inhumanity	Avengers Assemble #21–25; Inhumanity #1–2; Uncanny X-Men #15; Indestructible Hulk #17–20; New Avengers #13; Iron Man #20.INH; Inhumanity: The Awakening #1–2; Avengers A.I. #7; Mighty Avengers #4–5; Inhumanity: Superior Spider-Man #1	June 2014	978-0785184744
Inhuman	Inhuman #1–14, Annual, Original Sins No. 3	March 2016	978-0785195573

== See also ==
- Mutant
- Eternals
- Deviant
- X-Men
