= Lash Out (disambiguation) =

"Lash Out" is a song by Alice Merton.

Lash Out may also refer to:

- Lash Out, a Norwegian band featuring Andy LaPlegua
- "Lash Out", an episode of The Spies featuring Michael Forrest

== See also ==
- Lash (disambiguation)
