= Whippy =

Whippy or Whippey may refer to:

== People ==
=== Surnames ===
- David Whippey, American sailor
- Josh Whippy, Fijian rugby player
- Marques Whippy, Fijian basketball player
- Mikaelar Whippy, Fijian basketball player
- Nicole Whippy, New Zealand actress

=== Stage names ===
- Whippy (Mia Löfgren), former vocalist of Rednex
- Whippy (Brendon Dangar), anchor of radio show Chrissie & Jane

== Literature ==
- Mrs. Whippy, a novella by Cecelia Ahern
- Mr. Whippy, character in A Boy Called Dad

== Ice cream ==
- Mr. Whippy (United Kingdom), a popular brand of soft-serve ice cream mix in the United Kingdom
- Mr. Whippy Australia, the former franchise of the United Kingdom company in Australia, now independent
- Mr. Whippy New Zealand, the former franchise of the United Kingdom company in New Zealand, now independent

== Other uses ==
- Whippy, a freshwater cryptid said to dwell in Lake Massawippi
- Mr. Whippy, track on Herculean (song) by The Good, the Bad & the Queen
