= Inhuman (comics) =

Comic book series

- Promotional cover art to Inhuman #1; Art by Joe Madureira

Publication information
- Publisher: Marvel Comics
- Schedule: Monthly
- Format: Ongoing series
- Genre: Superhero
- Publication date: April 2014 – June 2015
- No. of issues: 14+1 Annual
- Main character: Inhumans

Creative team
- Written by: Charles Soule
- Artist(s): Joe Madureira, Ryan Stegman

Inhuman is a 14-issue ongoing comic book series published by Marvel Comics focusing on Inhumans as a fallout from Infinity, published between April 2014 and June 2015. It was written by Charles Soule.

== Overview ==
The series follows Medusa as she tries to lead the Inhumans following the disappearance of King Black Bolt in the aftermath of the Infinity event, in which new Inhumans, or "NuHumans", have sprung up around the globe.

Originally intended to debut in January 2014 as part of All-New Marvel NOW!, the departure of Matt Fraction as writer delayed the series release to April 2014.

== Collected editions ==
Inhuman has been collected in the following hardcovers:

Title	Material Collected	Publication Date	ISBN
Inhuman Vol. 1: Genesis	Inhuman #1-6	December 9, 2014	978-0785185772
Inhuman Vol. 2: Axis	Inhuman #7-11	April 7, 2015	978-0785187806
Inhuman Vol. 3: Lineage	Inhuman #12-14, Annual #1	August 11, 2015	978-0785198048
Inhuman	Inhuman #1-14, Annual #1, material from Original Sins #3	March 15, 2016	978-0785195573
