= Infinity (comic book) =

2013 Marvel Comics storyline

- Infinity #1 (Aug, 2013); Cover art by Adam Kubert

Publication information
- Publisher: Marvel Comics
- Genre: Military science fiction, superhero; Crossover
- Publication date: August – November 2013
- No. of issues: 6
- Main characters: Avengers; Builders; Black Order; Galactic Council; Guardians of the Galaxy; Illuminati; Inhumans; Thanos

Creative team
- Written by: Jonathan Hickman
- Artist(s): Jim Cheung; Jerome Opeña; Dustin Weaver

"Infinity" is a 2013 comic book crossover storyline that was published by Marvel Comics. Written by Jonathan Hickman with artwork by a rotating team of artists including Jim Cheung, Jerome Opeña, and Dustin Weaver, the series debuted in August 2013 and ran through November 2013.

The storyline concerns issues built up in multiple Marvel comic books as part of the Marvel NOW! initiative, primarily Avengers and New Avengers. These issues include a threat to the universe by an ancient race of aliens known as the Builders. The second is the mysterious ailments plaguing the universe with Earth at the center. The third is the political ramifications these events have on Earth's relationship to the rest of the galactic community.

The story itself involves Thanos attacking Earth while the Avengers are in space uniting the universe against the Builders, with the events of the 2013 "Age of Ultron" storyline acting as a catalyst for the rest of the universe to formally target Earth. The various tie-ins tell Thanos's attack from the perspective of various Marvel characters.

The aftermath of the event leads directly into the "Inhumanity" storyline, in which the Terrigen Mist is released throughout Earth, activating the latent abilities of dormant Inhumans.

A new Infinity-based event titled Infinity Countdown began February 2018 as part of the Marvel Legacy initiative.

== Publication history ==
Infinity was announced in February 2013 as part of Marvel's Free Comic Book Day preview story. Axel Alonso, Marvel's Editor-in-Chief, said "We've said how 'Nova,' 'Thanos Rising,' 'Guardians of the Galaxy' and Jonathan Hickman's 'Avengers' are all shaping the future of the Marvel Universe — this image will very specifically answer the question of 'How?...Our FCBD issue features an all-new story that leads into a huge epic later in the year". In April 2013, Marvel officially released details concerning the event, revealing it would run 6 issues and tie-in with Hickman's other two Avengers titles. In April 2013, Tom Brevoort stated the amount of tie-ins would be similar to that of the Fear Itself storyline.

In May 2013 it was announced two of the tie-in would be Kelly Sue DeConnick's books Avengers Assemble and Captain Marvel with issues 18-20 and 15-16 respectively. The Avengers Assemble tie-in tells the event from the perspective of Spider-Woman in issues 18 and 19 while Captain Marvel follows Carol Danvers as she and Hawkeye are captured in space. Issue 20 of Avengers Assemble features the Uncanny Avengers. In June 2013, it was announced that a new Mighty Avengers team would form during the events of Infinity. The team would have a diverse roster consisting of Luke Cage, the Superior Spider-Man, Falcon, Power Man, White Tiger, Blue Marvel, Monica Rambeau, She-Hulk, and a new Ronin.

In June 2013 it was announced that two four-issue mini-series would spin-out of Infinity, one titled the Infinity: The Heist and the other Infinity: The Hunt. The Heist involves a group of Iron Man villains led by Spymaster taking advantage of the chaos caused by Thanos's invasion of Earth to steal equipment from Stark Industries. It would be written by Frank Tieri with art by Al Barrionuevo. The Hunt features Wolverine, She-Hulk, and Hank Pym gathering the young heroes of the Marvel universe to hold a new Contest of Champions. However, Thanos interrupts this with his own challenge. It would be written by Matt Kindt with art by Steven Sanders. Other tie-ins were announced throughout June including Fearless Defenders, Secret Avengers, Superior Spider-Man Team-Up, and Thunderbolts.

In July 2013, it was announced that the repercussions of Infinity would result in a new comic book storyline titled Inhumanity, with a new ongoing Inhumans series by Matt Fraction at the heart of it. During Infinity, Terrigen Mist is spread throughout the world, resulting in a number of humans having their dormant Inhuman abilities being activated. The Inhuman royal family is split into different houses all competing to recruit these new Inhumans.

== Plot summary ==
=== Prelude ===
Upon receiving word from Captain Universe of a threat that is coming to Earth, the Avengers are advised to get Ex Nihilo and Abyss on their side and to free Starbrand and Nightmask so that they can help combat this threat. The threat in question turns out to be the Builders who are destroying many "imperfect" planets that do not fit their vision, and have cataloged Earth as a failure ever since they learned of Ex Nihilo's creation. The Avengers follow Captain Universe's suggestion and recruit Ex Nihilo, Abyss, Starbrand, and Nightmask onto the team. Meanwhile, the Black Order (Corvus Glaive, Black Dwarf, Ebony Maw, Proxima Midnight, and Supergiant) arrive on Earth.

=== Core miniseries and Avengers/New Avengers ===
==== Part 1 – "Infinity" ====
Arriving on Earth, the Outrider begins looking for Earth's secrets as he searches through Avengers Tower and the Jean Grey School for Higher Learning. Appearing at a S.W.O.R.D. base, the Outrider kills a S.W.O.R.D. agent in an effort to find Earth's weakness. While badly beaten by the Inhumans, the Outrider informs Thanos that the Avengers have left Earth, prompting his forces to prepare to invade Earth.

===== Avengers – "Avengers Universe 1" =====
The Avengers travel in space to the Galactic Council to decide the fate of the incoming Builders. The decision is to lure them into a trap and destroy them. Things go well in the council's favor until the Builders decloak the rest of their fleet and destroy most of the council's frigates. The Avengers, together with the remaining ships retreat in defeat.

===== New Avengers – "The Cull Obsidian" =====
Thanos' Black Order begin their invasion of Earth, attacking New York, Atlantis, and Wakanda in search of the Infinity Stones. In Attilan, Black Bolt calls a meeting with the Illuminati to inform them of Thanos' true purpose.

==== Part 2 – "Fall" ====
Most of the alien empires try to stop the Builders, which causes some catastrophic results. The Black Order arrives on Attilan, demanding Inhumans as tribute. Using the Terrigen Codex, Black Bolt discovers that Thanos was using the demand for a tribute as a cover-up to kill his lost Inhuman-descendant son, whose actual identity and location are unknown to him.

===== New Avengers – "The Thanos Seed" =====
Black Dwarf retreats after finding a heavy resistance in Wakanda, causing his expulsion from the Black Order. Using the Terrigen Codex, the Illuminati embark on the search for Thanos' son Thane, but are stopped by the appearance of a new incursion in Australia. Before reaching a decision about what to do about the other Earth, the Illuminati are greeted by an Aleph arriving from the other Earth. The Aleph leads them to the Builders of that universe, who explain that the early death of the multiverse led to the collapse of the superflow (the space between universes that they used to traverse them). In order to avert disaster and ensure the multiverse survives, the Builders across the multiverse have decided to destroy all Earths, thus hopefully stopping the incursions. Since the Builders of Earth-616 had failed in their mission, these Builders urged the Illuminati to destroy their own world.

==== Part 3 – "Kingdoms Fall" ====
Most of the alien empires have decided to surrender to the Builders. Captain America managed to make himself heard by the Galactic Council and planned a retaliation against the Builders which resulted in the successful liberation of the Avengers who were being held captive and the destruction of numerous forces of the Builders, partially turning the tide of the battle. After the Inhumans deny a tribute to Corvus Glaive, Thanos appears on Attilan to meet with Black Bolt. Black Bolt attacks Thanos with his hypersonic voice.

===== Avengers – "The Offer" =====
Black Dwarf is given another chance to prove himself by Thanos. Black Dwarf is sent to keep the Peak from being reclaimed by the Avengers.

==== Part 4 – "Thane" ====
Captain America realizes they are still outnumbered and outgunned and decides to perform a false surrender. Thor surrenders to the Builder in control of Hala and kills him, freeing the planet and gaining powerful lost allies. Thanos eventually survives Black Bolt's attack and continues the fight. As Thanos fights against Black Bolt, he detonates a Terrigen Bomb, which decimates Attilan and causes those exposed to it to undergo Terrigenesis, resulting in the emergence of thousands of Inhumans. Thane's power is unleashed, killing everyone else in the hidden city. Thanos fights Black Bolt, demanding to be told the location of his son. Black Bolt refuses to reveal the location, resulting in Thanos knocking out Black Bolt.

==== Part 5 - "The Left Hand of Death" ====
The death of the Builder at Thor's hands and the subsequent liberation of Hala sparks a general insurrection at all Builder-occupied worlds, which are dubbed "Avengers Worlds" by their grateful citizens in honor of Earth's heroes. Meanwhile, Thane has been captured by Ebony Maw, who reports his success back to Thanos. The Avengers receive word that Earth has fallen to Thanos. The Avengers and their allies head to Earth to free it from Thanos.

===== Avengers - "...To the Very End" =====
Black Dwarf fights the Avengers to keep them from reclaiming the Peak. During the battle, Ronan the Accuser arrives to help the Avengers and kills Black Dwarf.

==== Part 6 - "Amber" ====
The Avengers, the Guardians of the Galaxy, and Abigail Brand retake the Peak. At the same time, Starbrand devastates most of the enemy fleet with his power, forcing the survivors to retreat. In Necropolis, Lockjaw teleports Supergiant to an uninhabited world with an anti-matter bomb that Maximus detonates. Captain America, Captain Marvel, the Hulk, Hyperion, and Thor confront Thanos and his Black Order in Orollan. Hyperion kills Corvus Glaive, but Thanos and Proxima Midnight put the Avengers on the brink of defeat. Ebony Maw turns on his master and manipulates Thane into trapping Thanos and Midnight in amber. In the aftermath, the heroes and their allies pick up the pieces and rebuild, while the Illuminati continue to secretly find ways to prevent the impending death of the multiverse, with Thanos and Midnight in their custody. Maw departs with Thane, intent on turning him into something far worse than Thanos.

=== Tie-ins ===
==== Avengers Assemble ====
When the Terrigen Bomb was detonated in Earth's atmosphere, a housewife named Alice Taylor-Kezierski was exposed to the Terrigen Mists and underwent Terrigenesis. After emerging from her cocoon, she accidentally enlarges her husband and causes herself, two of her neighbors, and her house to shrink into the Microverse. With the help of Wasp and Wonder Man of the Uncanny Avengers, Alice was able to enlarge her house and her neighbors and shrink her husband back to their original proportions.

==== Captain Marvel ====
In Captain Marvel 15, after Carol Danvers had lost her memory, she participated in the Battle of the Corridor, temporarily regaining her binary powers as she drew near a black hole.

==== Fearless Defenders ====
Ren Kimura is a Japanese-American dancer who underwent Terrigenesis and discovered that she can conjure razor sharp metal ribbons from her fingertips. She joined the Fearless Defenders after being rescued from Thanos' forces.

==== Guardians of the Galaxy ====
After parting ways with Angela, the Guardians were off in space when they received a message from Abigail Brand asking them to help free her from the Black Dwarf's forces and liberate the Peak, S.W.O.R.D.'s orbital headquarters. Star-Lord and Rocket Raccoon enter the Peak and free Brand, but are cornered by Badoon forces, only to be rescued by Angela. With the help of the other Guardians, they regain control of the Peak's offensive weapons, thus easing the Avengers' assault on Earth when they return.

==== Infinity: Against the Tide ====
On the Skrull-owned planet of Hy'lt Minor, the Builders are brutally destroying any civilization the Skrulls created over time. Two best friends, a boy named K'eel R'kt and a girl named Rhena desperately attempt to survive. As they struggle, they are intercepted by a Skrull commander who is trying to make himself the only survivor. He quickly hits Rhena and presumably kills her. As the chaos grows, Silver Surfer arrives telling K'eel and the rest of the Skrulls that he is here to save the planet. However, the Skrull commander (believing that Norrin Radd is the herald to Galactus) starts a riot to further his troubles. Luckily, Rhena regains consciousness and Norrin pushes back some of the forces. However, they soon return.

==== Infinity: Heist ====
Since the death of Mandarin, Blizzard was seen robbing banks with Whirlwind. While the Avengers were away from Earth fighting the Builders, Spymaster approached Blizzard and Whirlwind who offered them to join up with him, Constrictor, Firebrand, Titanium Man, Unicorn, and Whiplash in a plot to attack the almost-defenseless Stark Tower. During the briefing, Blizzard suddenly collapses. When Blizzard regains consciousness, he discovers that he is an Inhuman and has gained the ability to generate electricity.

Blizzard and Whirlwind were forced into taking part of the assault to Stark Tower. After Spymaster used teleporter discs to teleport some Iron Man Armors to the buyers, he escaped and left Blizzard and the rest of his accomplices to be discovered by the heroes which were using the tower as a base. They managed to defeat the heroes, and they were offered to be taken to Spymaster by Titanium Man. When they arrived to a spaceship where Spymaster was, they were ambushed by him and Titanium Man who revealed himself as Captain Atlas. They managed to escape custody and started fighting Spymaster, Titanium Man and the army of Iron Men (which were controlled by the first). The actual Iron Man arrives to the spaceship after having tracked down the armors and helps Blizzard and his allies defeat their enemies.

==== Infinity: The Hunt ====
Shortly before Thanos' invasion of Earth, Hank Pym organizes a "Contest of Champions", a battle tournament between adolescent superheroes. The tournament will be held at the Avengers Compound at Palo Alto, California. The tournament is supervised by Pym (representing the Avengers Academy), Meggan (representing the Braddock Academy), Wolverine (representing the Jean Grey School for Higher Learning), and She-Hulk (representing the Future Foundation). As the various contestants are being selected from the Avengers Academy, they learn that Atlantis has been destroyed.

==== Mighty Avengers ====
As the Avengers have left Earth to fight the Builders, Thanos has come to tear the Illuminati apart. Ebony Maw has been tasked to defeat Doctor Strange while Proxima Midnight desires to destroy the city. The Heroes for Hire thwart a robbery of robot parts committed by Plunderer's men. Plunderer tries to get away, but is stopped by the Superior Spider-Man. With the Superior Spider-Man considering the Heroes for Hire as mercenaries, White Tiger quits the team.

The Mighty Avengers continue to battle the forces of Midnight. Spectrum is seriously injured. Bystanders help the Avengers get back in the fight. Thanos appears in hologram form berating Midnight for her failure to destroy the city. Uatu the Watcher visits Blue Marvel in his Undersea Science Fortress which he had previously modified. Blue Marvel talks with Uatu about his family life and how he could have taken up the opportunity to join the Avengers while mentioning his humanitarian work. Ebony Maw uses Doctor Strange to summon Shuma-Gorath to Earth. After a one-sided conversation, Blue Marvel stops Shuma-Gorath and heals Spectrum, who has been incapacitated by Midnight's spear.

==== Nova ====
After the skatepark was rebuilt following that he had accidentally destroyed during his superhero career, Sam Alexander encounters his crush, Carrie. Sam was caught off-guard when she told him that she knew that he was Nova. He then flew away in such a rush that he made a stupid mistake of accidentally removing his helmet mid-flight and fell straight out of the sky. When he awoke from the minor coma he had suffered, he finds New Warriors members Justice and Speedball trying to persuade him into joining the New Warriors. He initially refuses until he learned that they were good friends of Richard Rider. Nova agreed to see what it was like and what they know about the Nova Corps and Force.

==== Secret Avengers ====
S.H.I.E.L.D. computer specialist Sarah Garza is one of the newly surfaced Inhumans after Black Bolt unleashed the Terrigen Mist on Earth. Shortly after emerging from a cocoon, her unstable powers cause an explosion which decimates her apartment complex. Maria Hill partners Garza with Iron Patriot and gives her an armor to control her powers. Garza and Iron Patriot arrive to Brooklyn as reinforcements to help Nick Fury Jr. and Phil Coulson fight the invading forces. During the sweep, the heroes are attacked by an unknown enemy with apparent telekinetic powers who blames Garza for what happened to the apartment complex. When the strain of using his powers made the unknown enemy pass out, the Avengers proceeded to find refuge. As the communication signal was no longer being jammed, S.H.I.E.L.D. managed to get visual on the villain. It was revealed the Junkman of Brooklyn was a man called Gavrel Achter, a fellow Inhuman. Against Garza's wishes, Fury kills Achter.

==== Superior Spider-Man Team-Up ====
Sylvia Prell is a student who is one of the Inhuman descendants. She is exposed to the Terrigen Mists after it was unleashed upon Earth by Black Bolt. The manifestation of her electrical powers caught the attention of the Superior Spider-Man. Upon mastering her powers and becoming Fulmina, she helps the Superior Spider-Man defeat an alien army that works for Thanos.

==== Thunderbolts ====
Gordon "Gordo" Nobili is the patriarch of the Nobili crime family, who works in the Maggia. After undergoing Terrigenesis, Nobili gains purple skin, superhuman strength, and the ability to communicate with his deceased ancestors. During a subsequent fight with the Paguro family, Nobili's children Carmen and Joseph are killed. He vows vengeance on the person he thinks is responsible for everything: Punisher.

== Titles involved ==
Note: Some of these are involved with Infinity and not necessarily part of it.

Title	Issue(s)	Citation(s)
Prologue
Free Comic Book Day 2013 (Infinity)		
Prelude
Avengers	vol. 5 #14–17	
New Avengers	vol. 3 #8	
Core miniseries
Infinity	#1–6	
Tie-ins
Avengers	vol. 5 #18–23	
Avengers Assemble	#18–20	
Captain Marvel	vol. 7 #15–16	
Fearless Defenders	#10	
Guardians of the Galaxy	vol. 3 #8–9	
Infinity: Against the Tide	#1–2	
Infinity: The Heist	#1–4	
Infinity: The Hunt	#1–4	
Mighty Avengers	vol. 2 #1–3	
New Avengers	vol. 3 #9–12	
Nova	vol. 5 #8–9	
Secret Avengers	vol. 2 #10–11	
Superior Spider-Man Team-Up	#3–4	
Thunderbolts	vol. 2 #14–18	
Wolverine and the X-Men	Annual #1	

== Collected editions ==
Title	Material collected	Published date	ISBN
Infinity Incoming!	Inhumans (vol. 2) #2, Thanos Rising #1, Avengers (vol. 5) #1-2, New Avengers (vol. 3) #2, and material from Thor #146-149	August 2013	978-0785187851
Infinity	Infinity #1-6, New Avengers (vol. 3) #7-12, Avengers (vol. 5) #14-23, Infinity: Against the Tide Infinite Comic #1-2	February 2014	978-0785184225
Infinity: Heist/The Hunt	Infinity: Heist #1-4, Infinity: The Hunt #1-4	February 2014	978-0785189244
Infinity Companion	Captain Marvel (vol. 7) #15-16, Thunderbolts (vol. 2) #14-18, Avengers Assemble (vol. 2) #18-20, Infinity: The Hunt #1-4, Mighty Avengers (vol. 2) #1-3, Nova (vol. 5) #8-9, Superior Spider-Man Team-Up #3-4, Infinity: Heist #1-4, Fearless Defenders #10, Secret Avengers (vol. 2) #10-11, Guardians of the Galaxy (vol. 3) #8-9, Wolverine & the X-Men Annual #1	April 2014	978-0785188865
Avengers Vol. 3: Prelude to Infinity	Avengers (vol. 5) #12-17	October 2013	978-0785168256
Avengers Vol. 4: Infinity	Avengers (vol. 5) #18-23	January 2014	978-0785184140
New Avengers Vol. 2: Infinity	New Avengers (vol. 3) #7-12	January 2014	978-0785168379
Avengers by Jonathan Hickman: The Complete Collection Vol. 3	Infinity #1-6, New Avengers (vol. 3) #8-12, Avengers (vol. 5) #18-23	February 2021	978-1302926472
Avengers by Jonathan Hickman Omnibus Vol. 1	Infinity #1-6, Infinity: Against the Tide Infinite Comic #1-2, Avengers (vol. 5) #1-23, New Avengers (vol. 3) #1-12, Free Comic Book Day 2013 (Infinity), Astonishing Tales: Mojoworld #1-6, and material from Shang-Chi: Master of Kung Fu #1	July 2017	978-1302945473
Infinity by Starlin & Hickman Omnibus	Infinity #1-6, New Avengers (vol. 3) #7-12, Avengers (vol. 5) #14-23 and Infinity Gauntlet #1-6	April 2019	978-1302915650

== Other versions ==
=== What If? ===
Five different issues of What If detail about alternate outcomes for the Infinity storyline:

- "What If? Infinity - Inhumans" details what would happen if Black Bolt betrayed Earth.
- "What If? Infinity - Thanos" details what would happen if Thanos joined the Avengers.
- "What If? Infinity - X-Men" details what would happen if the X-Men were the sole survivors of Infinity.
- "What If? Infinity - Dark Reign" details what would happen if Norman Osborn managed to get his hands on the Infinity Gauntlet.
- "What If? Infinity - Guardians of the Galaxy" details what would happen if the Guardians of the Galaxy found out the Illuminati were hiding Thanos.

== Reception ==
Infinity
	CBR	IGN	Newsarama	Overall Average
- Issue: Rating
1	4.5/5 stars	4.2/5 stars	4/5 stars	4.23/5 stars
2	4.5/5 stars	4.15/5 stars	3/5 stars	3.8/4 stars
3	4.5/5 stars	4.15/5 stars	3.5/5 stars	4.05/5 stars
4	4.5/5 stars	4.2/5 stars	3.5/5 stars	4.06/5 stars
5	2.5/5 stars	4.25/5 stars	3/5 stars	3.25/5 stars
6	4.5/5 stars	4.2/5 stars	4/5 stars	4.23/5 stars
Overall Average	4.16/5 stars	4.18/5 stars	3.5/5 stars	3.936/5 stars

Infinity received largely positive reviews. Comic Book Round Up gave the Infinity series an average score of 8.0. (Note: The Average Score ComicBook Round Up gave the Infinity Event on their website consists of multiple comics that link to Infinity instead of being part of it, like the issues previously listed are.) ComicBook Round Up gave Infinity: Omnibus, which collects Infinity #1-6, Avengers #14-23, The New Avengers #7-12, and Infinity: Against the Tide Infinite Comic #1-2, an average "positive" score of 7.8.

IGN gave Infinity #1 an 8.4 "Great" Rating, Infinity #2 an 8.3 "Great" Rating, Infinity #3 an 8.3 "Great" Rating, Infinity #4 an 8.4 "Great" Rating, Infinity #5 an 8.5 "Great" Rating and Infinity #6 an 8.4 "Great" Rating. In their review for #1, IGN state "Infinity [#1] isn't your typical Marvel event comic, and that's definitely a good thing" and, throughout their reviews of each issue, praise the use of the wider Marvel Universe, the pacing, and how it "reads like a natural extension of Hickman's Avengers work", the depiction of Inhumans, the strong sense of scope and drama and the cohesive art, though criticising how it doesn't function well as an isolated story and "reads better with tie-ins".

Comic Book Resources stated that Infinity is "one of Marvel's strongest event series in years", and gave Infinity #1 a rating of 9.0 calling "a summer comic in all its glory. The cast is immense, the action is intense. The scene between Outrider and Black Bolt elevates the Inhuman king, who becomes one of the most interesting and mysterious characters in the Marvel Universe just by virtue of his "Infinity" appearance.". CBR called Infinity #2 "a must-read.", giving it 9.0, and in their review of Infinity #3, gave it 9.0 and called it "rife with intrigue, twists and poignant moments" and that "Hickman creates a dark, foreboding atmosphere appropriate to a war that seems impossible to win in his narration and dialogue". CBR called Infinity #4 (along with Infinity itself) "testament to Hickman's superb writing that readers should expect something really special yet to come" and called the visuals "simply brilliant", giving it 9.0. CBR also called Infinity #5 a "great comic for those looking for pure, unfiltered, cosmic space adventure, and nothing but. Such an adventure, though, without sufficient characterization to support it and provide a human connection is like a one-note guitar solo, or a one-ingredient recipe", giving it 5.0, and in their review for Infinity #6, gave it 9.0 and stated that it finished Infinity "in a most satisfying manner, presenting a solid template for future events." calling it "easily one of the most visually brilliant comic event conclusions produced in the past few years".

Newsarama gave Infinity #1 a score of 8 out of 10, Infinity #2 a score of 6 out of 10, Infinity #3 a score of 7 out of 10, Infinity #4 a score of 7 out of 10, Infinity #5 a score of 6 out of 10 and Infinity #6 a score of 8 out of 10.

SciFiNow called Infinity the "best comic event ever", calling it "about life and death", stating it "makes the Avengers truly iconic" and that it "offers closure where other events fail".

Jonathan Hickman was nominated a "Best Writer" Eisner Award for Infinity as well as East of West, The Manhattan Projects and Avengers.

== In other media ==
=== Video games ===
The plot of Infinity was adapted as the thirteenth Spec-Ops Mission of Marvel: Avengers Alliance, with Black Bolt as the reward hero, and Thane as the lockbox hero.

=== Television ===
The second-season finale of the animated series Avengers Assemble, "Avengers World", loosely incorporates elements from Infinity, with the Black Order freeing Thanos from imprisonment by the Nova Corps, to which he would a scheme to absorb the radiation of the core of New Korban to become titanically powerful in order to conquer the universe.

=== Film ===
Several elements of Infinity are loosely adapted for the 2018 film Avengers: Infinity War. Most notably, Infinity War features Thanos invading Wakanda and the inclusion of the Black Order.

=== Literature ===
Infinity received a prose adaptation in mid 2019, written by James A. Moore.
