= Whiplash =

Whiplash may refer to:

- Whiplash (medicine), a neck injury

== Film and television ==
- Whiplash (1948 film), a US film noir about a boxer
- Whiplash (1959 film), another name for Fiend of Dope Island, a lurid adventure film
- Whiplash, a 2002 film starring Ernest Borgnine and Bradley Gregg
- Whiplash (2013 film), a short film about a jazz drummer and his instructor, directed by Damien Chazelle, starring Johnny Simmons and J. K. Simmons
- Whiplash (2014 film), a feature film about a jazz drummer and his instructor, directed by Damien Chazelle, starring Miles Teller and J. K. Simmons
- Whiplash (TV series), Australia, 1960s drama set during the 1850s gold rushes
- An event in the Australian TV series Gladiators

=== Episodes ===
- "Whiplash" (Beavis and Butt-head)
- "Whiplash" (Iron Man: Armored Adventures)
- "Whiplash" (Law & Order)
- "Whiplash" (The Unit)

== Music ==
- Whiplash (band), an American thrash metal band
- Whiplash (album), by James, 1997
- Whiplash (EP), by Aespa, 2024
  - "Whiplash" (Aespa song)
- "Whiplash" (Metallica song), 1983
- "Whiplash" (Stellar song), 2006
- "Whiplash" by Hank Levy, recorded by Don Ellis on the album Soaring, 1973
- "Whiplash" by Selena Gomez & the Scene from When the Sun Goes Down, 2011
- "Whiplash" by FEMM from Femm-Isation, 2014
- "Whiplash" by NCT 127 from Cherry Bomb, 2017
- "Whiplash", song by The Boyz from Chase, 2020
- "Whiplash", by Architects from The Sky, the Earth & All Between, 2024

== Fictional characters ==
- Whiplash (Marvel Comics), several villains
- Whiplash (Masters of the Universe)
- Snidely Whiplash, from the Dudley Do-Right cartoons
- Whiplash, a main character from Turbo (2013 film)

== Video games ==
- Whiplash (video game), a 2003 platform game
- Fatal Racing or Whiplash, a 1995 racing game

== Other uses ==
- Whiplash (magazine) (Voorslag), a South African literary magazine
- Whiplash (wrestling), a neckbreaker-type move in professional wrestling
- Whiplash the Cowboy Monkey, a capuchin monkey known for riding a dog
- Whiplash Glacier, Antarctica
- Miss Whiplash, Lindi St Clair (born 1952), British prostitute, activist and author
- Weather whiplash, the phenomenon of rapid swings between extremes in weather
