= Medusa (Marvel Comics) =

Fictional character in Marvel Comics

- Medusa, Queen of the Inhumans. Art by J. Scott Campbell.

Publication information
- Publisher: Marvel Comics
- First appearance: Fantastic Four #36 (March 1965)
- Created by: Stan Lee; Jack Kirby

In-story information
- Full name: Medusalith Amaquelin-Boltagon
- Species: Inhuman
- Place of origin: Attilan
- Team affiliations: Inhuman Royal Family; Fantastic Four; Frightful Four; Lady Liberators; Illuminati; Future Foundation; AXIS; Galactic Council; A-Force; Universal Inhumans
- Partnerships: Inferno
- Notable aliases: Madame Medusa
- Abilities: Inhuman physiology: Enhanced strength, speed, stamina, durability, agility, and reflexes; Prehensile hair

Medusa (Medusalith Amaquelin-Boltagon) is a character appearing in American comic books published by Marvel Comics. Created by Stan Lee and Jack Kirby, the character first appeared in Fantastic Four #36 (1965).

Her name and aspects of the character are derived from Greek mythology, as her hair has prehensile attributes like that of the mythological Medusa's hair. The character has psychokinetic control over her hair, a power she obtained through Terrigenesis. With this power, she can extend her hair to double its normal length, using it to pick locks, lift objects, and contain objects and people. She is the queen of the Inhumans, wife of king Black Bolt and mother of Ahura.

Serinda Swan primarily portrayed Medusa in the 2017 Marvel Cinematic Universe (MCU) television series Inhumans.

== Publication history ==
Medusa first appeared in Fantastic Four #36 (1965) and was created by Stan Lee and Jack Kirby. She appears first in a flashback, then in costume as part of the fledgling "Frightful Four". She appears in Fantastic Four #38, 41-48 and in various subplot glimpses from #49-62. The Inhumans also appear in Fantastic Four # 82–83, with Medusa. The Inhumans are granted their first new adventure in Fantastic Four Annual #5, and a solo series in the split-book Amazing Adventures #1-10. The first four installments are written and drawn by Jack Kirby. The second four installments are written by Roy Thomas and illustrated by Neal Adams. That storyline flows into the ongoing "Kree-Skrull War" in The Avengers title #94-97.

Medusa also appeared prominently in the twelve part maxi-series The Inhumans written by Paul Jenkins and illustrated by Jae Lee in the 1990s.

Medusa appears in FF by Matt Fraction and Mike Allred, which debuted in November 2012.

Beginning in May 2015, Medusa appeared as one of the main characters in A-Force, an all-female Avengers spin-off being launched by G. Willow Wilson, Marguerite Bennett, and Jorge Molina during Marvel's Secret Wars crossover.

In 2017, Medusa appeared in an early adventure with the Frightful Four, published as The Avengers 1.1- 5.1. This five-issue mini-series is positioned between The Avengers #16 and #17 as a side story when the evil team thinks they have killed the Fantastic Four (in Fantastic Four #38), but no one knows it. The Frightful Four publicly attack Captain America and his new team of replacements after their press conference to earn some "street cred". They are defeated in a rematch in issue 4.1. Medusa presumably flees before the team's final cameo in 5.1, where they are preparing a grave for her as a "traitor".

== Fictional character biography ==
Medusa belongs to the race of Inhumans, a species of prehistoric earthlings mutated by the Terrigen Mists which originate from deep under the Inhuman city-state of Attilan. Medusa has a younger sister named Crystal, who later became the wife of the Avenger Quicksilver. Considered a member of Attilan's royal family, Medusa's parents chose to expose her to the Terrigen Mists, a natural mutagen that changes the biological makeup of the Inhuman race and gives them powers, when she was a child.

During her adolescent years, Medusa would often visit her distant cousin Black Bolt in his isolation cell, and learned to communicate with him through body language due to his destructive powers. Over the course of these visits, the two fell in love and eventually became engaged. Medusa attended Black Bolt's release from his cell when she was eighteen, and witnessed the first confrontation between Black Bolt and his brother Maximus.

Maximus claimed to be in love with Medusa, and throughout the comics made frequent attempts to usurp both the throne of Attilan and steal Medusa from Black Bolt. In Maximus' first successful attempt to take the throne, Medusa was knocked off of a sky-sled by Triton and afflicted with amnesia. Under the effects of this illness, Medusa left Attilan and wandered across Europe as a thief.

While still suffering from the effects of her injury, Medusa joined the super-villain team the Frightful Four and battled the Fantastic Four on three separate occasions.

She was then pursued by Gorgon on behalf of Maximus. Eventually, Medusa regained her senses and rejoined forces with the Inhuman royal family on the run. She was reunited with Black Bolt, who had been searching for her, and returned to Attilan. However, she became trapped in Attilan by the "negative zone" barrier created by Maximus. She was freed from the barrier at great cost by Black Bolt, and left the Great Refuge to visit the outside world as an adventurer. It was some time before the disastrous effects of worldly pollution on the Inhumans were known. She fights Spider-Man in his title for an issue after being manipulated by the manufacturer/promoter of a line of shampoo products. She also has been re-abducted by the Frightful Four in an attempt to manipulate her. The Fantastic Four became friends and allies and aided the Inhumans on several occasions, such as during the frequent power struggles between Black Bolt and the deranged Maximus.

Medusa has joined the Fantastic Four as a full team member for brief periods. She became a temporary replacement for Susan Richards, known as the Invisible Girl at that time, when Richards went on family leave to care for her comatose son Franklin Richards. Through her relations with the Fantastic Four, Medusa and Black Bolt have sought to achieve an understanding and peace between the races of Earth and Attilan. Nevertheless, the Inhumans have been forced to relocate their home of Attilan several times due to continued human hostility.

Black Bolt would eventually become the king of the Inhumans upon the death of his parents. Medusa oversaw the moving of Attilan to the Blue Area of the Moon. Alongside the Inhuman royal family, she battled the Avengers under Maximus's mind control. Medusa and Black Bolt were then married and Medusa was made queen, becoming both royal consort and royal interpreter.

When Medusa became pregnant, Attilan's Genetics Council argued that the pregnancy should be terminated due to the possibility of the child inheriting Maximus' insanity coupled with Black Bolt's immense and destructive power. Medusa defied the council and fled to Earth to avoid the compulsory abortion and live anonymously in the desert until the child was born, a son named Ahura.

Black Bolt reconciled with Medusa and the pair returned to Attilan and turned their infant son over to the Genetics Council. Following these events, Ahura was not mentioned or seen in the Marvel Universe for several years.

Later, alongside the Inhumans and the original X-Factor, she battled Apocalypse. Alongside the Inhumans and Avengers, she also battled the Brethren.

=== Royalty ===
Medusa's primary role among the Inhumans is as interpreter for her liege and husband, the silent but commanding Black Bolt. As such she is an experienced state figure within the quasi-feudal system of the Inhumans' government, and is used to speaking with awareness of regal issues of protocol and comportment. This imperial attitude is usually tempered by her strong sense of morality and fairness.

Medusa is featured in the six issue series Beyond!. In the book she is kidnapped along with other famous and infamous superhumans to the artificial planet Battleworld. Medusa witnessed Venom's killing of the Space Phantom disguised as Spider-Man, leading her to believe the real Spider-Man had been murdered. Medusa passes royal judgement that Venom must undergo fifty lashes. She supersedes the authority of the Avenger's representative, Janet Van Dyne, and uses the control over her hair to create a whipping motion so fast that it produces miniature sonic booms, which Venom is especially vulnerable to. While Hank Pym tries to dissuade Medusa from continuing the punishment, Venom is able to stab Medusa through the thigh. Later on in the issue, Medusa saves the team during the sudden crash landing of their space vessel by absorbing the majority of the impact with her hair. As stated by Wasp, Medusa is the team's primary short-range offense. Eventually the team triumphs over the Beyonder and returns to Earth. At the end of the series, Medusa can be seen alongside Black Bolt attending the funeral of her Beyond! teammate Gravity. She gives Gravity's parents a precious statue, the highest honor amongst the Inhumans, in commemoration of Gravity's sacrifice.

In I Heart Marvel, Medusa stars and narrates in a one-shot vignette appearing in issue #3 of the Marvel Ai edition. Titled Silence of the Heart, the story explores the relationship between Medusa and Black Bolt. Medusa explains that her husband's silence is a burden that she also bears. Black Bolt makes an appearance at this point and the two are shown to make love as Medusa contemplates her longing to hear a moan, whisper, or laugh from him.

The title Son of M focuses on Pietro Maximoff following the events of House of M. After attempting to commit suicide, a dying Pietro is brought to Attilan by Crystal. While Gorgon protests, Medusa grants Pietro asylum in Attilan until he is fully recovered. Once healed, a depowered Pietro tries to convince Black Bolt and Medusa to allow him access to the Terrigen Mists, but Medusa firmly states that Terrigenesis is a process forbidden to outsiders and that such a process upon a human could result in drastic mutations. Pietro manages to expose himself to the Mists regardless, and receives new powers before collecting both the Terrigen Crystals and his daughter, Luna, and returning to Earth. The crystals eventually end up in the possession of a black-ops sector of the United States government. The sector's subsequent refusal to return the crystals sparks a declaration of war between the Inhumans and the United States.

During this title it is made reference that Black Bolt and Medusa are childless. Upon discovery that Luna has been taken to Earth by Pietro, Medusa advises Crystal that perhaps it is right that Pietro should spend time with his daughter. Crystal remarks that if Medusa had children of her own she might be able to understand how she felt over the matter. It is not apparent whether this is an example of Ahura's existence being retconned from the Marvel Universe, or if this is meant to be a sarcastic comment in reference to Ahura's supposed confinement.

Medusa and Maximus, by Frazer Irving.

The events of Silent War immediately follow the events of Son of M. The Silent War series reveals a growing rift between Medusa and Black Bolt as the two disagree on his decision to declare war against the United States for failing to relinquish the Terrigen Crystals. Medusa finds herself no longer able to interpret her husband's wishes as she used to. While Medusa is issuing Black Bolt's war declarations to the Inhumans council he becomes frustrated and snaps his fingers to silence her, indicating that she wasn't relating what he intended. Medusa later confides to Black Bolt that he had never treated her that way before, as if she were a dog, and Black Bolt responds apologetically.

Their son, Ahura, also reappears in this series as a mentally unstable adolescent. Medusa argues that Black Bolt seems not to care that their son is being kept in isolation, and advises him that despite his orders she has gone to visit Ahura in his cell on more than one occasion. Black Bolt is angered by this and becomes physically aggressive with Medusa, grabbing her face and mouth to silence her. In her growing confusion with her husband's actions, Medusa finds herself drawn to Maximus against her will and would visit him often in his prison cell. It is revealed by Luna, Crystal's daughter, that Maximus had somehow implanted a "darkness" into Medusa's mind that was affecting her actions. Later on, Medusa and Maximus share a kiss as a distraught Black Bolt watches from the shadows. Medusa's thoughts at the time, however, reveal that she is not in control of her actions and that she only loves Black Bolt. The end of Silent War is left a cliffhanger with Black Bolt confined in prison, Ahura released, and Medusa now at Maximus' side as he assumes the throne of the Inhumans.

Due to inconsistencies with other Marvel titles featuring Black Bolt during this time, it is unclear when, and if, Silent War takes place in relation to The Illuminati, World War Hulk, and Secret Invasion storylines.

Medusa appears alongside Black Bolt in issue #1 of the World War Hulk series. Medusa is seen with Black Bolt when Hulk attacks Attilan. She warns Hulk not to pursue a fight with her husband, as Black Bolt has defeated Hulk in past battles. The fight begins and Medusa is not shown to interfere or assist. Black Bolt is subsequently defeated by Hulk, though the battle is not shown beyond Black Bolt's opening attack, and it is made unclear as to how Hulk managed to win the fight.

It was revealed in "New Avengers: Illuminati" that Black Bolt had been replaced by a Skrull impostor for an unknown amount of time. The impostor revealed himself to the Illuminati and was killed. Both the sudden rift between Medusa and Black Bolt apparent in Silent War and Black Bolt's later defeat at the hands of Hulk in World War Hulk could be attributed to this development, for it is uncertain just when Black Bolt might have been replaced by his Skrull duplicate.

When the "Secret Invasion" begins, the Inhumans part of the story, by Joe Pokaski, explores how the Inhuman royal family deals with the news that the Black Bolt they knew was a Skrull impostor. Medusa is shown fighting a Skrull who possesses her powers as well as those of Mister Fantastic. Medusa heads into Kree space to get Ronan the Accuser to help look for the Skrull ship containing Black Bolt and her son. She succeeds in rescuing her family and returning to Attilan.

During the "War of Kings" storyline, Medusa was with the Inhumans when they went into space and forged an alliance with the Kree and was also there when Havok, Lilandra Neramani, and the rest of Havok's Starjammers requested asylum from Vulcan and his forces. When Maximus speaks out, Medusa pushes him aside. After Ronan is wounded in battle with Vulcan's forces, Medusa states to the Shi'ar that they had made a big mistake and vows that they will pay for this. Medusa sends a broadcast on Black Bolt's behalf and tells the citizens of the Kree empire that they have suffered an unprovoked assault by the forces of the Shi'ar. The shield that once protected their star system has fallen. During a discussion with the other members of the Inhuman royal family, Medusa states that Shi'ar blood will spill in the next fight while trying to keep the Kree in line. Medusa and Black Bolt approve of Maximus' idea to create a mechanism to help them in their fight against the Shi'ar. Medusa ends up devastated when the T-Bomb goes off with Black Bolt and Vulcan in its vicinity. While weeping in Crystal's arms, Medusa declared that they have won.

During the "Dark Reign" storyline, Medusa was seen when Quicksilver appears in Attilan and present them with the Xerogen Crystals following the defeat of Unspoken. Medusa then absolves him of his crimes and restores his citizenship.

During the "Realm of Kings" storyline, Medusa ends up taking control of the Inhumans following Black Bolt's death. Devos the Devastator arrives and ends up inciting a riot in the Alpha Primitives. The Mighty Avengers arrive and help to quell the riots incited by Devos. Henry Pym learns from Medusa about what happened to Black Bolt and expresses his sorrow for her loss as he too had lost Wasp. Medusa and the rest of the Inhumans deal with Dr. Vere and Zarek when they plot to overthrow the Inhuman royal family.

She takes her husband's place in the Illuminati when Iron Man reassembles the team in response to the Hood's attempts to acquire the Infinity Gems, although in the end Steve Rogers takes 'custody' of Black Bolt's gem at the conclusion of the crisis.

As part of the Marvel NOW! event, Medusa becomes a member of the Future Foundation when the Fantastic Four take a time-traveling trip.

During the "Civil War II" storyline, Medusa and Crystal introduce the Inhuman Ulysses Cain to Captain Marvel, War Machine, and Black Panther. Medusa later catches Iron Man infiltrating New Attilan to claim Ulysses and fails to reason with him. After Iron Man defeats Medusa, Crystal, and Karnak and makes off with Ulysses, Medusa leads some Inhumans to Stark Tower to confront Iron Man which led the Avengers, the Ultimates, S.H.I.E.L.D., and other superheroes to intervene. Medusa was present when Ulysses projected his latest vision of a rampaging Hulk standing over the corpses of the superheroes.

During the "Inhumans vs. X-Men" storyline, Beast overhears Medusa telling the rest of the Inhuman royal family that they to be prepared just in case the X-Men lose patience in their truce and attack them. As the X-Men take action against the Inhumans, Medusa sends Iso and Inferno to find out what happened to Black Bolt and Crystal as she prepares for battle. Medusa then fights the time-displaced Beast in the lab of the original Beast as she effectively calls off the truce. As she gets the upper hand, Nightcrawler teleports in and takes her away. Despite the subsequent escalation of the conflict, when Medusa learns that the X-Men only attacked now because the Terrigenesis cloud was about to reach the point where it would make the whole planet toxic to mutants, she resolves the situation by destroying the cloud, preventing any further Inhumans from manifesting their powers, feeling that the future of her species is not worth the present loss of mutant life that would result. She also abdicates her throne to Iso.

When the Inhumans obtain the Primagen from the Progenitors' World Farm and Gorgon buys his fellow Inhumans time to get away, Maximus takes a sample of the Primagen and has a vision where the Progenitors attack Earth in retaliation for the theft of the Primagen. While on the Astral Plane with Black Bolt, Medusa and Black Bolt agreed to continue as partners and not lovers. When Medusa takes the Primagen, it restores her hair and health while also causing a backlash in the attacking Progenitor to destroy the approaching Progenitors. This causes the Ordinator-Class Progenitors who saw the attack from the World Farm to spare Earth from their invasion.

During the "Death of the Inhumans" storyline, Medusa is seen with the Inhuman royal family when they find the dead bodies of the Universal Inhumans. When an explosive trap starts to go off, Medusa manages to make it out alive. Medusa and the Inhuman royal family later mourn the fallen Inhumans following Vox's attack on New Arctilan. After Black Bolt is taken captive by the Kree, Medusa and the surviving Inhuman royal family members try to recruit Beta Ray Bill in their fight against Vox and the Kree. They arrive just in time to save Black Bolt from Vox. Medusa is present when it is discovered that Vox is not a Super-Inhuman and is just a Kree programming. Medusa and Karnak fight a Vox-controlled Crystal and Lockjaw before Black Bolt's scream frees the controlled Inhumans. The Kree retreat and the group teleport away.

Medusa and Black Bolt once again become lovers later on.

== Powers and abilities ==
Medusa possesses a long, thick head of red hair; thanks to her exposure to the mutagenic Terrigen Mist, every strand of her hair has great tensile strength, modulus of elasticity, and sheer resistance far surpassing human hair. She possesses the psychokinetic ability to animate her hair for a number of feats, including elongating it to almost twice its normal length (Medusa's hair is approximately 6 feet (1.8 m) in length when relaxed), and using her hair to lift and move heavy weights (up to 1.6 tons); a portion of her hair must be used to anchor the rest at these greater weights, so that more than her scalp/skull is used as a brace.

Medusa and her hair, by Jae Lee.

Medusa can control the movement of her hair as if it were countless thin appendages growing from her head. A psionic field permeates her mutagenically altered hair-cells, causing mutual attraction across the gaps between strands. These relatively small forces operate in conjunction to develop larger forces. Through concentration, she can psionically move her hair in any manner imaginable. She can snap the length of it through the air like a whip (the tip of which moves faster than the speed of sound), or rotate it in a fan-like manner. She can bind persons or objects with it as if it were rope, or use it to lift objects which weigh more than she could lift with her arms. Her scalp, skull, and neck do not support the weight of an object that she lifts; it is held aloft by the psionic force coursing through the hair. Medusa can also perform delicate manipulations with her hair such as lock picking or threading a needle, and such complex acts of coordination as typing or shuffling a deck of cards. Although she has no nerve endings in her hair, she can "feel" sensations on all parts of her hair by a form of mental feedback from her psionic field.

Medusa is an accomplished thief, using her hair. Medusa is also able to retain some degree of control over her hair after it has been cut or otherwise severed from her scalp. She presumably has the typical enhanced physical abilities granted by the genetically superior Inhuman physiology. She is also highly skilled at interpreting the gestures and body language of Black Bolt, and is fluent in a special sign language she uses with Black Bolt.

Like all Inhumans, Medusa's immune system is weaker than that of an average human. However, due to her frequent ventures into the outside world, Medusa's immune system is stronger than that of her fellow Inhumans. As such, she has attained a resistance to the pollutants of the outside world.

== Cultural impact and legacy ==
=== Critical reception ===
Medusa has received positive reception over the years. Critics have praised her unique abilities, her status as a queen and diplomat, and her time as part of the Fantastic Four and the Future Foundation. Peyton Hinckle of ComicsVerse praised the Royals miniseries, where Medusa temporarily lost her powers and was depicted as more vulnerable.

=== Accolades ===
- In 2015, IGN included Medusa in their "7 Inhumans We Want on Agents of S.H.I.E.L.D." list.
- In 2016, ComicBook.com included Medusa in their "10 Marvel Women Who Should Come to Disney Infinity 3.0" list.
- In 2016, ComicsAlliance ranked Medusa 3rd in their "Marvel's Royal Inhumans, Ranked From Worst To Best" list.
- In 2017, Screen Rant ranked Medusa 17th in their "Every Member Of The Fantastic Four, Ranked Worst To Best" list.
- In 2018, CBR ranked Medusa 6th in their "20 Most Powerful Inhumans" list.
- In 2018, Paste ranked Medusa 9th in their "20 Members of the Fantastic Four" list.
- In 2018, Screen Rant ranked Medusa 8th in their "15 Most Powerful Kings And Queens In The Marvel Universe" list.
- In 2019, CBR ranked Medusa 7th in their "10 Most Powerful Members Of Royalty In Marvel Comics" list and 9th in their "10 Most Powerful Queens In the Marvel Universe" list.
- In 2020, CBR ranked Medusa 9th in their "5 Marvel Women Who Should Have Their Own Solo Comic (& 5 Who Already Do)" list.
- In 2021, Screen Rant ranked Medusa 5th in their "Fantastic Four: 10 Best Female Villains" list. and 6th in their "Marvel Comics: 10 Best Alternate Members Of The Fantastic Four" list.
- In 2022, CBR ranked Medusa 2nd in their "10 Inhumans Who Should Join The Avengers" list, 7th in their "10 Best Fantastic Four Substitute Members" list, and 12th in their "Every Member Of The Illuminati" list.

== Other versions ==
Various alternate universe versions of Medusa have appeared throughout the character's publication history. In Earth X, Medusa became the leader of the Inhumans after Black Bolt's death. In the Ultimate Marvel universe, Medusa has green skin and snakes for hair, akin to her mythological namesake. Medusa Moonrider, a composite character based on Medusa and DC Comics character Mark Moonrider, appears in the Amalgam Comics universe.

== In other media ==
=== Television ===
- Medusa appears in The New Fantastic Four. This version is the leader of the Inhumans and a member of the Frightful Four who is genuinely evil as opposed to being forced into villainy.
- Medusa appears in Spider-Man (1981), voiced by B. J. Ward.
- Medusa appears in Fantastic Four, voiced by Iona Morris. This version is the queen of the Inhumans and a member of the Frightful Four, having lost her memory caused by Maximus.
- Medusa appears in the Hulk and the Agents of S.M.A.S.H. episode "Inhuman Nature", voiced by Mary Faber.
- Medusa appears in Ultimate Spider-Man, initially voiced by Mary Faber and later by Rose McGowan.
- Medusa appears in Guardians of the Galaxy, voiced by Catherine Taber.
- Medusa appears in Avengers Assemble, voiced again by Catherine Taber in the third season and Vanessa Marshall in the fifth.
- Medusa appears in Inhumans (2017), portrayed by Serinda Swan.
- Medusa appears in Marvel Future Avengers, voiced by Hiroko Ushida in Japanese and Erica Lindbeck in English.
- Medusa makes a non-speaking appearance in the Spider-Man episode "Vengeance of Venom".

=== Video games ===
- Medusa appears as a non-playable character in Marvel: Ultimate Alliance, voiced by Nancy Linari.
- Medusa appears as an unlockable character in Marvel: Avengers Alliance.
- Medusa appears as an unlockable character in Marvel Future Fight.
- Medusa appears as an unlockable character in Marvel Avengers Academy, voiced by Amber Lee Connors.
- Medusa appears as a playable character in Lego Marvel Super Heroes 2.
- Medusa appears as an unlockable character in Marvel: Contest of Champions.
- Medusa appears as a playable character in Marvel Puzzle Quest.
- Medusa appears as a non-playable character in Marvel Ultimate Alliance 3: The Black Order, voiced again by Mary Faber.
- Medusa appears in Marvel Snap.

=== Miscellaneous ===
Medusa appears in the Inhuman motion comic, voiced by Lisa Ann Beley.
