= Marvel Now! =

Branding for the relaunch of several comic books published by Marvel Comics

- Promotional image for Marvel Now! Art by Joe Quesada.
- Publisher: Marvel Comics
- Publication date: October 2012 – May 2015
- Genre: Superhero
- Main character: Marvel Universe

Creative team
- Writer: Various
- Artist: Various

Marvel Now! (stylized as Marvel NOW!) is a comic book branding for the relaunch of several ongoing comic books published by Marvel Comics, that debuted in October 2012 with new #1 issues. The relaunch also included some new titles, including Uncanny Avengers and All-New X-Men. Described as a shifting of the Marvel Universe following the conclusion of the "Avengers vs. X-Men" storyline, Marvel Now! entailed changes to both the publishing format and the universe to attract new readers. Publishing changes included new creative teams for each of the titles and the in-universe changes included changes to character designs and new storylines. It marked the next stage of the Marvel ReEvolution initiative, which began in March 2012. The original run went through several waves before coming to an end in May 2015 at the start of the "Secret Wars" storyline. A second Marvel Now!, Marvel Now! 2.0, debuted in 2016 following the "Civil War II" storyline. Marvel Now! 2.0 was followed in 2017 by Marvel Legacy.

== Publication history ==
Marvel Comics first announced the launch of Marvel Now! in July 2012. Marvel Editor-in-Chief Axel Alonso described it as "the next chapter in the ongoing saga of the Marvel Universe." Alonso further explained, "From October through February, we'll provide at least one great reason for readers—old, lapsed or new—to go into a comic store each week: a new issue #1, featuring an exciting new creative team and driving concept, that's an easy entry-point into the Marvel Universe." Marvel Chief Creative Officer Joe Quesada stressed that unlike DC Comics' The New 52, it is not a reboot, but a shifting of the Marvel Universe following the events of Avengers vs. X-Men. Quesada explained that there will be "a lot of changes to the character status quos, alter egos, costumes, creator shifts, design shifts, the way that we do our covers, digital shifts and the way we start delivering our books".

In March 2013, Alonso announced that Marvel would be launching a new wave of Marvel Now! titles, dubbed Wave Two, in the summer of that year. Alonso stated, "There are plans for a Marvel Now! Wave 2—a new wave of titles that will generate the same amount of excitement amongst retailers and fans that the first wave did. From 'Uncanny Avengers' to 'Thanos Rising,' Marvel Now! has been a hit, and we're far from done. Look for exciting new series, starting in July and carrying through next year". It was announced a week later that Avengers A.I. would be the first of these new titles.

In September 2013, Marvel announced a next phase of Marvel Now! in the aftermath of the "Infinity" storyline, (which led into the "Inhumanity" storyline) called "All-New Marvel Now!" which will see new series being launched and will also provide entry issue to existing series. These entry issues will be branded as .NOW issues. For example, Avengers #24 was billed as Avengers #24.NOW. Several new series, such as Inhuman and All-New Invaders were also announced.

In January 2014, Marvel announced that following the conclusion of the Ultimate Marvel miniseries Cataclysm in April 2014, and coinciding with the Marvel Universe All-New Marvel Now! launch, three new Ultimate series will debut from April 2014, under the banner Ultimate Marvel Now!. The three series are: Miles Morales: Ultimate Spider-Man, Ultimate FF, and All-New Ultimates.

In July 2014, Marvel announced that a fourth wave, Avengers Now!, would launch in October. The wave focuses exclusively on solo titles for individual Avengers, and takes place in the aftermath of the "Original Sin" storyline.

Marvel Now! officially ended in May 2015 at the start of the "Secret Wars" storyline, which saw the end of the Marvel Universe. Following the conclusion of Secret Wars, the universe was scheduled to be relaunched again with the branding All-New All-Different Marvel. Alonso described the relaunches as reminiscent of the North American television season, explaining "I think that the comics industry – certainly, we are – slowly working into a season model that's not too unlike what we see in our favorite cable TV shows: a seasonal model that offers accessible entry points for new readers and is respectful of long-term fans. We did Marvel Now! and All-New Marvel Now!, which were both two very successful campaigns. And [All-New All-Different Marvel] is the latest campaign."

In May 2016, Marvel announced the return of Marvel Now! following the conclusion of the "Civil War II" storyline. Marvel Executive Editor Tom Brevoort stated that the relaunch was timed to coincide with "Civil War II" as means to "refresh and revitalize" the titles explaining, "One of the things a big event story is judged on, rightly or wrongly, is what kind of an impact it has on the Marvel Universe in its aftermath. That just becomes a condition of these big event stories: what is it at the end that changes the landscape?"

== Titles ==
=== Wave One ===
==== New on-going series / volumes ====
Title	Publication Date	Initial Creative Team	Notes / References
A+X 1–18	October 2012 – March 2014	Writer various Artist various	An anthology series with each issue consisting of two stories by different creative teams featuring a different team-up of an Avenger and an X-Man.
All-New X-Men 1–21 special 1	November 2012 – December 2013 (rebranded in All-New Marvel Now!)	Writer; Brian Michael Bendis; Artist; Stuart Immonen	Features the past versions of the original X-Men (Angel, Beast, Cyclops, Iceman and Jean Grey) being transported to the present.
Avengers 1–23 annual 1	December 2012 – November 2013 (rebranded in All-New Marvel Now!)	Writer; Jonathan Hickman; Artist; Jerome Opena	Hickman said, "Avengers and New Avengers are really just two sides of the same book, of the same story. Thematically, they're aligned too. Avengers is about life and New Avengers is about death. That's what the two books are. It's a big book. In the Avengers, we tackle the biggest things."
Avengers Arena 1–18	December 2012 – November 2013	Writer; Dennis Hopeless; Artist; Kev Walker	The series takes 16 young heroes from the Marvel Universe including Avengers Academy's Hazmat, Mettle, Reptil, X-23, and Juston Seyfert and his Sentinel; Cammi, and Darkhawk; Runaways' Nico Minoru and Chase Stein; and a host of new characters, and pits them against each other in a kill-or-be-killed reality-show-like scenario on Murderworld run by Arcade.
Cable and X-Force 1–19	December 2012 – January 2014	Writer; Dennis Hopeless; Artist; Salvador Larroca	The team initially consists of Cable, Forge, Domino, Colossus and Doctor Nemesis. Hopeless said, "In my mind this is a crime series, so I tried to cast the book like you would a bank robbery. This isn't a family or a school. It's a crew. A safe cracker may hate her getaway man, but at the end of the night, she still needs him to drive the car. Cable puts the team together for their skills, not because he thinks they'll get along."
Captain America 1–15	November 2012 – January 2014 (rebranded in All-New Marvel Now!)	Writer; Rick Remender; Artist; John Romita Jr.	Remender described the tone to be "almost like Kirby Sci-Fi Indiana Jones". "High adventure dipped in sci-fi spy fantasy with heavy focus on the man under the suit. Steve's fabric and his relationships drive our story and the action is the byproduct. Tonally it's very serious. You want to make sure the characters go up against things that feel like real threats and [put] them into interesting situations. It's a lot less of the connection with S.H.I.E.L.D. and the spy work and more big high adventure super hero stuff with sci-fi that I tend to lean into."
Deadpool 1–24 annual 1	November 2012 – February 2014 (rebranded in All-New Marvel Now!)	Writer; Brian Posehn; Gerry Duggan; Artist; Tony Moore	In terms of concept, Duggan said, "It starts with a man who has decided that America has a lot of problems that can only be fixed by bringing back our former leaders, our great American Presidents. But that's not how it works out. Once they're back, they have a completely different idea of what they need to do and what the country needs. It's a distasteful job having to send our presidents back, but Deadpool is up for the job and is suited for it."
FF 1–16	November 2012 – January 2014	Writer; Matt Fraction; Artist; Mike Allred	Features a new team initially consisting of Ant-Man, Ms. Thing, Medusa, and She-Hulk.
Fantastic Four 1–16 5.AU	November 2012 – January 2014 (relaunched in All-New Marvel Now!)	Writer; Matt Fraction; Artist; Mark Bagley	In the initial storyline, the superhero family takes a vacation into space to expand their children's view of life.
Fearless Defenders 1–12 4.AU	February 2013 – December 2013	Writer; Cullen Bunn; Artist; Will Sliney	Centers on a new all-female team that includes Valkyrie, Misty Knight and Danielle Moonstar amongst others. Bunn said, "The basic idea of the book is that Valkyrie is choosing a new team of Valkyrior, and she's been asked to choose all these women from the heroes of Midgard (Earth), instead of from Asgard".
Guardians of the Galaxy 0.1 1–10	February 2013 – December 2013 (rebranded in All-New Marvel Now!)	Writer; Brian Michael Bendis; Artist; Steven McNiven	Features the line-up reestablished in Bendis' Avengers Assemble (Star-Lord, Gamora, Drax the Destroyer, Groot and Rocket Raccoon) plus a new member; Iron Man. Bendis said, "Here's an Avenger (Iron Man) who wants to get to the next level and he's just not going to get it where he is, but if he does a tour of duty with the Guardians he may find himself opening up his eyes to things that will help him with his inventions and the way he sees the world".
Indestructible Hulk 1–20 annual 1 special 1	November 2012 – March 2014	Writer; Mark Waid; Artist; Leinil Yu	The series picks up a few weeks after the events of Jason Aaron's Incredible Hulk. Waid said, "No one's seen Hulk or Banner for a few weeks, which has the Avengers and S.H.I.E.L.D. really nervous. S.H.I.E.L.D., in particular, has gone to great lengths in recent years to make absolutely certain that it's impossible for Banner to stay off the grid for any length of time—and yet, he's vanished. And this literally affects the entire planet. Every country is on the equivalent of orange alert. Airport security is a nightmare. World leaders are ready to bunker down at a moment's notice. Surveillance cameras are selling faster than they can be manufactured. Everyone's tense. Maria Hill, in particular, has taken "Finding Banner" as her own personal mission, and when our story opens, she's finally taking her first break in weeks. And as it happens, her timing sucks."
Iron Man 1–22 20.INH annual 1	November 2012 – February 2014 (rebranded in All-New Marvel Now!)	Writer; Kieron Gillen; Artist; Greg Land	Gillen said, "The story will focus on him (Iron Man) questioning things about himself and trying to find out exactly how the universe ticks, what's this all about and why he does this anyway. It's going to be one of the major themes of the book going forward."
Morbius: The Living Vampire 1–9	January 2013 – October 2013	Writer; Joe Keatinge; Artist; Richard Elson	Keatinge said, "There are very strong horror elements to it, but there's a lot more to it than that... This is a book largely about people who have absolutely no easy role in society. The outcasts. The people on the fringe. The people of the Marvel Universe who are even too weird for the X-Men.
New Avengers 1–15	January 2013 – February 2014 (rebranded in All-New Marvel Now!)	Writer; Jonathan Hickman; Artist; Steve Epting	The title centers on the Illuminati, initially consisting of Black Panther, Black Bolt, Captain America, Doctor Strange, Iron Man, Mister Fantastic, and Namor.
Nova 1–12	February 2013 – January 2014 (rebranded in All-New Marvel Now!)	Writer; Jeph Loeb; Artist; Ed McGuinness	Centers on the new Nova, Sam Alexander and answers questions about the character's origins.
Savage Wolverine 1–13	January 2013 – December 2013 (rebranded in All-New Marvel Now!)	Writer; Frank Cho; Artist; Frank Cho	Cho said, "This isn't just a solo Wolverine story. It's actually a team-up story with Shanna the She-Devil. Both Wolverine and Shanna have similar assertive personalities. The story is not just a quest to get home; it's a story about surviving each other's company and the Savage Land.
Secret Avengers 1–16	February 2013 – March 2014 (relaunched in All-New Marvel Now!)	Writer; Nick Spencer; Artist; Luke Ross	Features a team consisting of Black Widow, Hawkeye, Mockingbird, Hulk, and a new Iron Patriot, which works closely with S.H.I.E.L.D. agents Nick Fury, Jr. and Phil Coulson. Spencer said, "This really is a S.H.I.E.L.D. book. I think it's something we've been long suffering for and is long overdue. This gave us a nice excuse to get a proper S.H.I.E.L.D. comic going. This Avengers initiative within S.H.I.E.L.D. is obviously a big focal point of the book, but it still is a S.H.I.E.L.D initiative so everything originates there. So Nick Fury and Agent Coulson are very much involved in the missions. Nick will be in the field with the team. That's his role. He's the S.H.I.E.L.D agent that goes with these characters on the missions. Coulson has a fun role in that he's backup and support. He's the guy who makes the pitch, and brings in the team. So they're a big part of every issue and in some ways they're even our leads.
Superior Spider-Man 1–26 6.AU annual 1	January 2013 – January 2014 (rebranded in All-New Marvel Now!)	Writer; Dan Slott; Artist; Ryan Stegman	The series follows up the events of The Amazing Spider-Man #700. Slott said, "This is still very much the world of Spider-Man. There may be a new Spider-Man here, doing things in a new and different way, but you're going to see the Spider-cast reacting to this. You're going to see how this Spider-Man will deal with our Spider-Man's villains. How will he react to this Spider-Man's supporting cast? Whoever makes it out of The Amazing Spider-Man #700 will find a different Spider-Man waiting for them when Superior Spider-Man starts."
Thor: God of Thunder 1–18	November 2012 – January 2014 (rebranded in All-New Marvel Now!)	Writer; Jason Aaron; Artist; Esad Ribic	The series is set over the course of a millennium. Aaron said, "ultimately it's all about Thor, and by showing him in three very different eras of his life—as the young hotheaded god of the Viking Age, as the accomplished and legendary Avenger of the present, and as an aging king of a broken future Asgard".
Thunderbolts 1–19 annual 1	December 2012 – January 2014 (rebranded in All-New Marvel Now!)	Writer; Daniel Way; Artist; Steve Dillon	Features a line-up consisting of Deadpool, Elektra, Punisher, and Venom, led by Red Hulk. Editor Jordan D. White said, "They're a team of loners, but all highly trained and highly skilled as either mercenaries or soldiers. This is a black ops dream team... They're all characters with their own very particular morality, who do the things they do because they believe in them. They believe they are doing right, even if the world around them might not."
Uncanny Avengers (vol. 1) 1–17 8.AU	October 2012 – February 2014 (rebranded in All-New Marvel Now!)	Writer; Rick Remender; Artist; John Cassaday	A new team of Avengers that initially features a line-up of both classic Avengers and X-Men including Captain America, Havok, Rogue, Scarlet Witch, Thor, and Wolverine. The team is a response to the events of Avengers vs. X-Men.
Uncanny X-Force 1–17	January 2013 – January 2014	Writer; Sam Humphries; Artist; Ron Garney	The series focuses on Psylocke, who survives the events of "Final Execution", the final story arc running in Rick Remender's Uncanny X-Force. The team's initial line-up also includes Storm, Puck, Spiral and newcomer Cluster. Humphries said, "I think it's fair to say that Psylocke is a survivor. She's someone who rises above her complicated past and the tragedy and figures out what's best for Betsy. I can't spoil anything, but at the end of Rick's run, we leave Betsy in one situation, and in the first issue of my run, we pick up six months later, and Betsy is definitely in a life transition point. It's kind of being in that moment that kicks off the events of that first arc.
Uncanny X-Men 1–18	February 2013 – February 2014 (rebranded in All-New Marvel Now!)	Writer; Brian Michael Bendis; Artist; Chris Bachalo	Centers on Cyclops and the remnants of his Extinction Team following the conclusion of Avengers vs. X-Men, including Magneto, Magik, and Emma Frost although the romance between Cyclops and Emma Frost is finished. Bendis said, "The romance is done. They are not together anymore romantically. It's pretty hard to come back from what they went through in Avengers Vs. X-Men. Things were said, powers were stolen, and as we will discover in the very first issues of Uncanny X-Men, some things happen between them that cannot be taken back".
Wolverine (vol. 5) 1–13	March 2013 – January 2014 (relaunched in All-New Marvel Now!)	Writer; Paul Cornell; Artist; Alan Davis	Cornell said, "This is the series that gets into what makes James Logan (Wolverine) tick, that shows him being, as he puts it, 'a regular guy,' interacting with civilian friends of his in New York City. The most amazing thing about James is that he's been alive so long, gone through so many extraordinary things... but holds on to being a guy who likes to hang out in bars with good company... He's a man of the people. I'm going to poke that and see what happens."
X-Men 1–9	May 2013 – January 2014 (rebranded in All-New Marvel Now!)	Writer; Brian Wood; Artist; Olivier Coipel	Features an all-female cast, including Jubilee, Storm, Rogue, Kitty Pryde, Rachel Grey, and Psylocke. Wood said, "I feel like as far as the X-Men go, the women are the X-Men. Cyclops and Wolverine are big names, but taken as a whole, the women kind of rule the franchise. If you look at the entire world as a whole, it's the females that really dominate and are the most interesting and cool to look at. When you have a great artist drawing them, they look so amazing and always have." X-Men debuted May 29, 2013.
X-Men Legacy 1–24 300	November 2012 – March 2014	Writer; Si Spurrier; Artist; Tan Eng Huat	The series is centered around Legion (David Haller), the son of Professor X. Spurrier said, "As far as I know the idea of basing the series round David has been in the works since the plotting of Avengers Vs. X-Men. David's story grows organically from those events. In fact I'd go so far as to say it's the tale that really needs to be told in the aftermath period. My brief was pretty simple: take a thoroughly screwed-up young character—who's been handled so differently by so many narrative teams down the years that it's tricky for anyone to say for sure exactly who he is or what his voice might be and launch him into the Marvel Universe... Show us who he is. What he can do. What he wants to do but can't yet."
Young Avengers 1–15	January 2013 – January 2014	Writer; Kieron Gillen; Artist; Jamie McKelvie	Features a line-up including Wiccan, Hulkling, America Chavez, Hawkeye, Marvel Boy, and Loki. Gillen said, "The first arc is pretty much Loki puts the Avengers together. [sic] And of course Loki did inadvertently put the original Avengers together, but why is he actively trying to put this team together? The readers know that Loki is bringing the group together. The characters don't. There's a sense that Loki is clearly the manipulator here".

==== Other on-going series ====
Title	Publication Date	Initial Creative Team	Notes / References
Avengers Assemble 9–25 annual 1	November 2012 – March 2014	Writer; Kelly Sue DeConnick; Artist; Stefano Caselli	Starting with issue #9, DeConnick and Caselli took over duties on Avengers Assemble. DeConnick revealed the initial lineup includes Captain America, Iron Man, Thor, Hulk, Spider-Woman, and Captain Marvel. She said, "I'm interested in them as celebrities. I'm interested in how you work being a hero and a celebrity – how that status works for them. I'm interested in new media ideas, as well, and I'm trying to weave a little of that through... The Avengers in the age of the internet – how does that affect their public personas? And the ideas of evolution and transformation and the different ways that these people look at the future."
Avenging Spider-Man 16-22	January 2013 – June 2013	Writer; Christopher Yost; Artist; Paco Medina	
Captain Marvel 9–17	January 2013 – November 2013 (relaunched in All-New Marvel Now!)	Writer; Kelly Sue DeConnick; Artist; Dexter Soy	Beginning with issue 9, Captain Marvel became a part of Marvel Now!. In the series, Carol Danvers, the longtime super-heroine known as Ms. Marvel, assumes the mantle of Captain Marvel. DeConnick stated at the 2012 WonderCon that the series reflects on what the legend of Captain Marvel means to Danvers, what she will do with it and what the rest of the Marvel Universe thinks of her new role.
Daredevil 23-36	February 2013 – February 2014 (relaunched in All-New Marvel Now!)	Writer; Mark Waid; Artist; Chris Samnee	
Dark Avengers 184-190	December 2012 – May 2013	Writer; Jeff Parker; Artist; Neil Edwards	
Gambit 8-17	January 2013 – September 2013	Writer; James Asmus; Artist; Pasqual Ferry	
Hawkeye 6-22	December 2012 – July 2015	Writer; Matt Fraction; Artist; David Aja	
Red She-Hulk 58–67	October 2012 – July 2013	Writer; Jeff Parker; Artist; Carlo Pagulayan; Wellington Alves	Starting with issue #58, the title and focus of Hulk shifted to Red She-Hulk, still written by Jeff Parker with art by Carlo Pagulayan and Wellington Alves.
Scarlet Spider 13-25	January 2013 – December 2013	Writer; Christopher Yost; Artist; Khoi Pham	
Venom 31-42	February 2013 – October 2013	Writer; Cullen Bunn; Artist; Declan Shalvey	
Winter Soldier 15-19	February 2013 – June 2013	Writer; Jason Latour; Artist; Nic Klein	
Wolverine & the X-Men (vol. 1) 19–42 27.AU annual 1	October 2012 – February 2014 (relaunched in All-New Marvel Now!)	Writer; Jason Aaron; Artist; Nick Bradshaw	From issues #19–23, Wolverine and the X-Men was part of Marvel Now! and continued to be written by Jason Aaron and drawn by Nick Bradshaw. Aaron said, the series would follow the events of Wolverine and the X-Men #18, in which the character Broo was shot in the head, and would return to the same type of stories that they were doing before Avengers vs. X-Men, "This is our first Marvel Now! issue, issue #19, so if anything we're trying to get back to where we were before the 'AvX' madness. It picks up right after the events of 18. There were a lot of angry people on the Internet, which was great. It made my day."
X-Factor 250-262	January 2013 – September 2013	Writer; Peter David; Artist; Nic Klein	

==== Limited series ====
Title	Publication Date	Initial Creative Team	Notes / References
Alpha: Big Time 1-5	February 2013 – June 2013	Writer; Joshua Hale Fialkov; Artist; Nuno Plati	
Superior Carnage 1-5 Annual 1	July 2013 – November 2013	Writer; Kevin Shinick; Artist; Stephen Segovia	
Thanos Rising 1–5	April 2013 - August 2013	Writer; Jason Aaron; Artist; Simone Bianchi	A five issue limited series that tells the origin story of the supervillain, Thanos. Aaron said, "This is without a doubt one of the creepiest stories I've ever gotten to write for Marvel. It's the origin of an outer space serial killer, the story of the universe's weirdest romance and a grand cosmic tragedy, all wrapped up in one. This is me taking five issues to really dig into the head of a space-faring world conqueror, mass murderer and hopeless romantic. I love writing stories with villains as the main character, and this book is about Thanos all the way." Marvel previously announced a Thanos origin story titled Thanos: Son of Titan to be written and drawn by Joe Keatinge and Richard Elson, respectively, but was canceled prior to its planned release in the summer of 2012 and the creative team moved over to Morbius: The Living Vampire.

==== One-shots ====
Title	Publication Date	Initial Creative Team	Notes / References
Marvel Now! Point One	October 2012	Writer various Artist various	A one-shot that features six short stories from the creative teams of Brian Michael Bendis and Steve McNiven, Matt Fraction and Mike Allred; Jeph Loeb and Ed McGuinness; Kieron Gillen and Jamie McKelvie; Nick Spencer and Luke Ross and Dennis Hopeless and Gabriel Hernandez Walta. Tom Brevoort, Marvel's senior vice president of publishing, stated that the intent of this book is to set the stage for several of the Marvel Now! series and plots.

=== Wave Two ===
==== New on-going series / volumes ====
Title	Publication Date	Initial Creative Team	Notes / References
Avengers A.I. 1–7	July 2013 – December 2013 (rebranded in All-New Marvel Now!)	Writer; Sam Humphries; Artist; Andre Lima Araujo	The series serves as an aftermath to the Age of Ultron event and the first new title in Marvel's Wave Two of Marvel Now! comics. The book follows a team of synthetics brought together by Hank Pym in order to combat a new danger. Humphries said, "Artificial intelligences are a product of human ingenuity, and although they are going to be going down their new path, they will remain a mirror to humanity...Understanding that and exploring that in ways that are going to be funny and touching and endearing are definitely going to be parts of this book".
The Superior Foes of Spider-Man 1–17	July 2013 – November 2014	Writer; Nick Spencer; Artist; Steve Lieber	The series explores Boomerang and the new Sinister Six (Shocker, Speed Demon, Overdrive, and Beetle) as they team up to pursue crime in a city dominated by a new, less forgiving Spider-Man and the title has a humorous tone.
Superior Spider-Man Team-Up 1–12 special 1	July 2013 – April 2014	Writer; Christopher Yost; Artist; David Lopez	The series continues where Yost's "Avenging Spider-Man" left off, with the new title acknowledging the changed status quo since the events of "Dying Wish".

=== All-New Marvel Now! ===
==== New on-going series / volumes. ====
Title	Publication Date	Initial Creative Team	Notes / References
All-New Ghost Rider 1–12	March 2014 – March 2015	Writer; Felipe Smith; Artist; Tradd Moore	Smith said, "Our All-New Ghost Rider, as the title suggests, is an absolutely new character: Robbie Reyes. Robbie's an East Los Angeles high school senior with a short fuse and a passion for electronic music and absolutely anything powered by an engine. In comparison to previous Ghost Riders, he's young and inexperienced in life; but his harsh inner city upbringing, overall distrust for most people, and serious contempt for his violent surroundings make him the perfect host for a Spirit of Vengeance. The circumstances by which Robbie becomes our blazing anti-hero differ from those of his predecessors, and his vehicle of choice is the automobile; so in more than one way, this is the story of a different brand of Ghost Rider."
All-New Invaders 1–15	January 2014 – March 2015	Writer; James Robinson; Artist; Steve Pugh	The series follows the classic four members of the original Invaders (Captain America, the Winter Soldier, Namor, and the original Human Torch) and puts them in a present-day battle against the Kree.
All-New X-Factor 1–20	January 2014 – January 2015	Writer; Peter David; Artist; Carmine Di Giandomenico	Features a corporate sponsored team of mutants including Polaris, Quicksilver, and Gambit. David said, "It picks up sort of directly after X-Factor #260. I dropped some reasonably obvious hints in that one as to what direction we were going."
The Amazing Spider-Man 1–18 1.1–1.5 16.1–20.1 annual 1	April 2014 – October 2015	Writer; Dan Slott; Artist; Humberto Ramos	Peter Parker returns (in body and mind) as Spider-Man. Quipped series writer Dan Slott, "(Parker's coming back) just in time, fancy that, for a major Spider-Man motion picture. It seems uncanny. It was very nice for Sony to schedule the movie around the story."
Avengers Undercover 1–10	March 2014 – September 2014	Writer; Dennis Hopeless; Artist; Kev Walker	The series follows the survivors of Avengers Arena as they try to infiltrate the Masters of Evil. Hopeless said, "The characters who survived Murder World came out the other side much different than they went in. Those psychological scars from the "Arena" weigh heavily on all of the kids. They don't fit so well into their old lives. They no longer feel like they belong and they're all looking for a way to get back what they've lost. All of this leads them down the path of Avengers Undercover."
Avengers World 1–21	January 2014 – July 2015	Writer; Nick Spencer; Jonathan Hickman; Artist; Stefano Caselli	Spencer said, "What the book is all about is really in the title. This is a book about geography. Its about what Marvel Earth looks like now. Obviously we've seen the Avengers make a pretty big statement about this world being under their protection and them being the representatives of our world. So it felt like it was time to do a book about what that planet looks like; not just Marvel New York or Marvel Space, but what does Marvel Europe, Asia and Africa look like right now? So it was a chance to do a story that was really global in scope and go some places that maybe we haven't been to before and really play with the idea of what that changing landscape would look like."
Black Widow 1–20	March 2014 – September 2015	Writer; Nathan Edmondson; Artist; Phil Noto	Edmondson said, "Without giving too many of our plot turns away, Natasha [Romanova] is a character driven by atonement. She's a hero now, but she was a villain, and a dirty one. The kinds of things she's guilty of in her past, in Russia, do not go away with some vitamin B and a glass of water in the morning. She has a lifetime to make up for her past deeds, and we'll see that her "penance," if you will, is both interior and exterior: she's helping her own psyche as well as those she's injured, in a very particular way."
Captain Marvel (vol. 8) 1–15	May 2014 – July 2015	Writer; Kelly Sue DeConnick; Artist; David Lopez	Editor Steve Wacker said, "The first Captain Marvel series was very personal for Carol. It got rid of a bunch of baggage that had built up around the character over the years. We're going to see Carol reaching out more. We're going to see her in a context we haven't seen her in a lot during the last couple of years. As she moves up and away from Earth, she'll probably meet the Guardians of the Galaxy at some point. So her new mission takes her higher than she's ever been, faster than she's ever been and farther than she's ever gone. It gives her sort of a clean start, which is something Kelly Sue sets up very well at the end of the last "Captain Marvel" series."
Cyclops 1–12	July 2014 – June 2015	Writer; Greg Rucka; Artist; Russell Dauterman	The series deals with the time-displaced, young Cyclops, brought to the present in All-New X-Men, joining his father Corsair on a cosmic road trip. Rucka said, "This is a story about the two of them. At the heart of everything we're going to do here, it's about these two. When you think about that 16-year-old Scott, what he's carrying into this is pretty obvious. "I've spent eight years as an orphan, I've moved from place to place, and some places have been awful. I got to a place that was a good place, relatively, I had a father figure in Xavier, and I had a purpose – and then all of that got disrupted. And then here comes my real dad, and he's Han Solo!" So that's awesome right there."
Daredevil 1–18 0.1 1.50 15.1	September 2014 – June 2015	Writer; Mark Waid; Artist; Chris Samnee	The series sees Matt Murdock transplanting to San Francisco. About the move Waid said, "Without spoiling too much of the final issue of the previous series, we can tell you that Matt has to leave New York and, in many ways, has no choice but to return to California–specifically, California, no where else to go. But that's where he and his cast will hang their collective hat from now on." Adding, "At least one cast member will accompany him. Maybe not all. And the nature of Matt's law practice will have to change substantially. And, of course, there's the architecture–cityscapes and street locales have always been a big part of DD's storytelling, and this will be a whole new look."
Elektra 1–11	April 2014 – February 2015	Writer; Haden Blackman; Artist; Mike del Mundo	Wells said, "It's about her trying to find herself, through violence, of course. I don't want to give too much away, but Elektra is given a list of targets to hunt that are even deadlier than her. She becomes a hunter of assassins."
Fantastic Four (vol. 5) 1–14 642–645 annual 1	February 2014 – April 2015	Writer; James Robinson; Artist; Leonard Kirk	Robinson said the series is about "a family finding the strength to face adversity through the help and love of each other." Robinson continued, "We're going to see the fragmentation of the family due to villainous outside forces that are slowing picking at them and eroding them. The arc I'm going to be telling is basically the fall and the rise of the Fantastic Four, and especially the fall and rise of Johnny Storm."
Hulk 1–16 annual 1	June 2014 – July 2015	Writer; Mark Waid; Artist; Mark Bagley	Banner's status quo will be violently disrupted when new volume of "Hulk" kicks off. Waid said "Banner's in a VERY bad way physically as the series opens up a few hours after the end of the previous one."
Inhuman 1–14 annual 1 special 1	June 2014 – June 2015	Writer; Charles Soule; Artist; Joe Maduiera	The series follows the fate of Black Bolt and his royal family in the aftermath of the Infinity event, in which new Inhumans have sprung up around the globe forcing the once-secret society of the Inhumans into the open. Originally scheduled for January it was later delayed until April, and writer Matt Fraction was replaced by Charles Soule over "creative differences" with Marvel.
Iron Fist: the Living Weapon 1–12	June 2014 – July 2015	Writer; Kaare Kyle Andrews; Artist; Kaare Kyle Andrews	In the series, Danny Rand returns to K'un-Lun, the mystical city where he was trained, in order to find purpose in his life. Andrews described Rand "as kind of a Bruce Wayne without a plan. He's despondent. He is not connecting with life, and he doesn't know why."
Iron Patriot 1–5	May 2014 – September 2014	Writer; Ales Kot; Artist; Garry Brown	Kot said, "James Rhodes is the human equivalent of Superman – the Man of Steel – in the Marvel universe. He wants to do good and good only. What he realizes in the beginning of our story is that he's got a deep need to adjust his life. What does James Rhodes want to stand for? What does he want Iron Patriot to stand for? You will know by the end of #1. James Rhodes makes a decision that changes everything for him."
Legendary Star-Lord 1–12	September 2014 – July 2015	Writer; Sam Humphries; Artist; Paco Medina	Humphries said, "Star-Lord is a really fun character to write because he's very bold, he's very confident. The book is going to be Peter's adventures away from the Guardians. ... I like to call him the original outer-space scoundrel — he actually pre-dates Han Solo. He likes to fight, he likes to flirt, he flies by the seat of his pants."
Loki: Agent of Asgard 1–17	April 2014 – October 2015	Writer; Al Ewing; Artist; Lee Garbett	The series follows Loki, who has been depicted as a teenager in recent years. Ewing said in this series, "Loki isn't the old self that he used to be. He's as adult as say Kate Bishop. A young man of stolen wealth and varied taste with the universe as his oyster and a penchant for black nail varnish. So we're stripping that story right back to the basics and giving him at least the illusion of a fresh start – back to the core of the trickster, the mischief-maker.
Magneto 1–21	May 2014 – October 2015	Writer; Cullen Bunn; Artist; Gabriel Hernandez Walta	Bunn said, "Magneto in this story is very much a detective, seeking out and investigating threats to mutants before cutting loose with all the fury of a supervillain — or superhero, depending on your point of view."
Moon Knight 1–17	May 2014 – September 2015	Writer; Warren Ellis; Artist; Declan Shalvey	Ellis says the series takes Marc Spector back to New York City because "there's just a wonderful strangeness to seeing that particular figure against a New York landscape... [Out of all the] urban caped superhero characters, I think he's almost the most incongruous." Adding, "[His] cape is actually a crescent moon and he goes out only at night and dresses in reflective white so you can see him coming. Now that's nuts... I like that."
Ms. Marvel 1–19	April 2014 – December 2015	Writer; G. Willow Wilson; Artist; Adrian Alphona	The series follows Kamala Khan, a 16-year-old American Muslim girl from New Jersey with body-morphing powers. Wilson said, "The Ms. Marvel mantle has passed to Kamala Khan, a high school student from Jersey City who struggles to reconcile being an American teenager with the conservative customs of her Pakistani Muslim family. So in a sense, she has a 'dual identity' before she even puts on a super hero costume. Like a lot of children of immigrants, she feels torn between two worlds: the family she loves, but which drives her crazy, and her peers, who don't really understand what her home life is like."
New Warriors 1–12	April 2014 – January 2015	Writer; Christopher Yost; Artist; Marcus To	The series features a team initially consisting of Speedball, Justice, Nova and a host of new characters including: Sun Girl, a human; Haechi, an Inhuman; Hummingbird, a demigod; Water Snake, an Atlantean; and Scarlet Spider (Kaine Parker), a clone of Spider-Man.
Nightcrawler 1–12	June 2014 – May 2015	Writer; Chris Claremont; Artist; Todd Nauck	The series follows Nightcrawler's resurrection in the first arc of Amazing X-Men, and will also heavily feature Wolverine. Originally, Nightcrawler was slated to be the next version of X-Men: Legacy; about the subject, editor Daniel Ketchum said, "With all the excitement surrounding Kurt's return, the enthusiasm from both fans and creators alike, we ultimately decided that this book couldn't be called anything other than 'Nightcrawler'."
The Punisher 1–20	April 2014 – September 2015	Writer; Nathan Edmonson; Artist; Mitch Gerads	In the series, Frank Castle, the New York-based vigilante, relocates to Los Angeles. About the setting, Edmondson said, "Los Angeles offers all kinds of fun opportunities. There are mountains, skyscrapers, beaches and slums all in a sprawl big enough to host a variety of villainous antagonists. The southern border may play a part of the story, too. L.A. is a schizophrenic city — it has so many identities, we can never get bored having Frank interact with each of them. And nearby are military bases."
Rocket Raccoon 1–11	September 2014 – July 2015	Writer; Skottie Young; Artist; Skottie Young	About Rocket Raccoon's adventures in his solo ongoing series, Young said, "We're definitely going to play around with his scoundrel side. We'll get him away from the Guardians and he'll have some solo adventures. So we'll definitely see that side, but we'll weave in and out of there as we look at other aspects of his character. We'll see things like what it's like to be the last of your kind left in the galaxy, but mostly this is a book about a striped-tailed, loud mouth raccoon with big guns."
Savage Hulk 1–6	June 2014 – January 2015	Writer; Alan Davis; Artist; Alan Davis	"We wanted big names, super stars and break out talent to tell their unique Hulk stories within continuity," series editor Mark Paniccia told Marvel.com. "That might be now, or using elements of the past and perhaps even glimpses of the future. It all comes back to the current Hulk mythos while letting the talent cut loose with that Hulk story that they've been dying to tell."
Secret Avengers 1–15	March 2014 – April 2015	Writer; Ales Kot; Artist; Michael Walsh	The series follows the events of the "How to Maim a Mockingbird" storyline in the previous volume and sees the addition of Spider-Woman to the team. Kot said, "Spider-Woman fascinates me because she's a character who is trying to learn how to have a life she can be happy with while juggling many different pieces of her life at once. She's occasionally confused and she very much wants to grow. I find that very relatable."
She-Hulk 1–12	February 2014 – January 2015	Writer; Charles Soule; Artist; Javier Pulido	The series follows Jennifer Walters' personal life, life as lawyer and as a superhero. Soule said, "It's not at all out of character for Jennifer Walters to go out partying all night, or spend a day hanging out at the beach. It's hard to imagine a story where, say, the Punisher does that. At the same time, one of the things I want to work hard to do in this new series is treat her as a real person. She absolutely has problems, just like most of the heroes of the Marvel U, but she chooses to approach them with optimism and good spirit rather than surrendering to the grim and gritty. It takes a lot to bring She-Hulk down, although we'll throw a lot at her."
Silver Surfer 1–15	March 2014 – present	Writer; Dan Slott; Artist; Mike Allred	The series sees Norrin Radd severed from Galactus and free to explore the universe with a human friend named Dawn Greenwood. Slott said, "The way I look at the Surfer is that he's the embodiment of freedom. The character has really been two things since he became the Silver Surfer. He's been a slave to Galactus, and he's been a prisoner of Earth, trapped beyond that great barrier. There's something about him where, the minute you take that barrier away, and the minute you take him away from Galactus, he's the guy with the board who can go anywhere and do anything. It really is that kind of joy and freedom like you're 16 and you just got the keys to the car. But imagine not just driving near your home – you can go anywhere in the universe. There's something very exciting about that."
Spider-Man 2099 1–12	July 2014 – present	Writer; Peter David; Artist; Will Sliney	The series involves Miguel O'Hara getting trapped in Earth-616 and having to live with Peter Parker until he can return home and destroy Alchemax.
Storm 1–11	July 2014 – present	Writer; Greg Pak; Artist; Victor Ibanez	In the series, Storm will be leaving the X-Mansion and going around the world solving crimes, stopping natural disasters, and just generally saving the world. About the series, Pak said, "In this series, Storm's going to take on threats no other X-Men would or could — no matter what the consequences."
Wolverine (vol. 6) 1–12 annual 1	February 2014 – September 2014	Writer; Paul Cornell; Artist; Ryan Stegman	The series finds Wolverine reconnecting with his darker side and joining a group of minor super villains as he tries to make his life more simple. Cornell said, "This series is going to look into what it means to be a "villain" and how those guys think of themselves. Logan finds a real comradeship there, and a release—and a relationship."
Wolverine & the X-Men (vol. 2) 1–12	March 2014 – November 2014	Writer; Jason Latour; Artist; Mahmud Asrar	The series focuses on three students – Quentin Quire, Evan Sabahnur and Idie Okonkwo. Latour said, "These kids are Logan's legacy, but as we've seen up to this point he didn't have such a great track record with that stuff even when he was at his best. In them we could be witnessing the growth of the next great team of X-Men, or the creation of the biggest threats the Marvel U will ever see. Everything we're planning, the adventures, the threats, will reflect that journey."
X-Force 1–15	February 2014 – February 2015	Writer; Simon Spurrier; Artist; Rock-he Kim	An X-Force team led by Cable, including Psylocke, Fantomex, and Marrow, which works as a "dirty tricks" department for the mutant nation. Spurrier said, "So we're going to see them on hits. We're going to see them stealing intelligence, technology and weaponry from other factions. We're going to see them truffling-out emergent threats and destroying them before they can get started. It's broadly the same denominator of old — a black ops X-Men team — but with a lot more of an emphasis on International and inter-factional competition."

==== Other ongoing series ====
Title	Publication date	Initial creative team	Notes / References
All-New X-Men 22–41 annual 1	January 2014 – present	Writer; Brian Michael Bendis; Artist; Stuart Immonen	Starting with issue #22.NOW, begins a new storyline called "The Trial of Jean Grey". Editor Steve Wacker said, "Really, the incident that set this all in motion was the Phoenix coming back. That goes back to the story that Brian built with all the other guys in Avengers vs. X-Men. What I can tell you from the Guardians' — and a lot of the cosmic characters' — point of view is that Earth keeps getting involved in huge messes. So many of these incredibly powerful characters live on Earth, and from what anyone can tell Earth can not by any measure handle this power. So everyone is afraid of our cute, little planet. If you're out in the universe, you see that every day there's some conflagration coming from Earth. It's like a baby that needs its bottle constantly. Earth is this very angry baby, and there's a group of important figures 'out there' that want to fix that, but you're also a little scared of that angry baby."
Avengers 24–44 34.1–34.2	December 2013 – April 2015	Writer; Jonathan Hickman; Artist; Esad Ribic	Starting in issue #24.NOW, the Avengers must reassemble after the events of Infinity and prevent the annihilation of the Earth and a rogue planet, as it hurtles towards Earth.
Avengers A.I. 8–12	January 2014 – April 2014	Writer; Sam Humphries; Artist; Esad Ribic	Starting in issue #8.NOW, the threat of Dimitrios, which may result in the extinction of the human race, that's been looming since the start of the series escalates. The story takes the team to the 130th century and will feature guest appearances by the Uncanny Avengers and a new division of S.H.I.E.L.D. called the "Robot Hunter Squad".
Captain America 16–25	February 2014 – October 2014	Writer; Rick Remender; Artist; Pascal Alixe; Nic Klein	Starting in issue #16.NOW, the series falls under the All-New Marvel Now! banner. Remender said, "So #16.NOW is a good jumping on point because it sets up pretty much my next year of Captain America and who Jet Black is. Cap's been living with and confiding with her since she came back to Earth with him in the aftermath of the "Dimension Z" storyline, and Earth to her is the place she was supposed to be queen of. It was a place her father trained her to rule over one day because its populace would be infected with the consciousness of [Arnim] Zola and become her minions."
Deadpool 25–45 annual 1 bi-annual 1	March 2014 – April 2015	Writer; Brian Posehn & Gerry Duggan; Artist; Mike Hawthorne	Issue #25.NOW marks the end of the "Deadpool vs. S.H.I.E.L.D." storyline. About why he chose to end a storyline instead of start a storyline with the issue Duggan said, "I don't want to spoil anything, but the reason we put that issue there is that it sort of turns the page in our run. It's an important moment for Wade, personally, and if you've never read Deadpool, you'll get all of the sense of fun and horror of being Deadpool in that one issue."
Guardians of the Galaxy 11–27 annual 1	January 2014 – present	Writer; Brian Michael Bendis; Artist; Sarah Pichelli	Starting in issue #11.NOW, the series crossover with All-New X-Men in "The Trial of Jean Grey" storyline. Editor Steve Wacker said, "I think the Guardians look at the X-Men and they see a bunch of kids with great power who are more in-the-way than they are helpful. The X-Men, on the other side, have seen a lot in their short time here. When the Guardians show up, it surprises everybody because they don't look like your normal super hero group. They look more Uncanny than the X-Kids — with that raccoon and that talking tree. The group dynamics are going to be very exciting and lend themselves to conflict; maybe a couple of friendships as well. There are certainly a couple of X-Men I could see getting along pretty well with the Guardians."
Iron Man 23–28 Special 1	March 2014 – June 2014	Writer; Kieron Gillen; Artist; Luke Ross	Starting with issue #23.NOW, begins a new storyarc called "Rings of the Mandarin" in which Iron Man takes on Malekith the Accursed. Gillen said, "I've introduced the idea that the Mandarin's rings appear to be sentient, and are seeking a new owner with some grudge against Stark. Malekith is one of the people who gets a ring."
New Avengers 16–33 annual 1	March 2014 – April 2015	Writer; Jonathan Hickman; Artist; Rags Morales	Starting with issue #16.NOW, New Avengers became a part of All-New Marvel Now!. Hickman said, "In New Avengers, we're going to touch on a lot of the multiversal threats. We're going to explain who the adversaries out there are and get into where each of the characters are after Infinity."
Nova 13–31 Annual 1 Special 1	February 2014 – present	Writer; Gerry Duggan; Artist; Paco Medina	Starting with issue #13.NOW, Beta Ray Bill will guest-star in Nova. Duggan said, "My first big arc begins in Nova #13 – we use #11 and #12 to build up the seeds of the confrontation, as Sam does a good thing for the wrong people. In doing so, he unwittingly assists the bad guys so Beta Ray Bill comes to Earth and demands some answers. It's more than a little dust-up, as miscommunication leads to a pretty fun fight that might surprise some people. That kicks off Nova #13 and is a great jumping-on point for new people. People can get to know Sam pretty quickly in the ensuing arc we follow Sam and Bill into space as they try to clean up Sam's mess."
Savage Wolverine 14–23	January 2014 – September 2014	Writer; Richard Isanove; Artist; Richard Isanove	Starting with #14.NOW, the series begins a new story-arc. Isanove said, "The basic principle of "Savage Wolverine" is that each story arc is self-contained. I didn't want to deal with any continuity issues, so I created a full cast of new characters, good and bad, who are all dealt with by the end of the story. It's set in 1933, at the end of the Prohibition era and 4 years into the Great Depression."
Superior Spider-Man 27–33 annual 1	February 2014 – September 2014	Writer; Dan Slott; Artist; Giuseppe Camuncoli	Starting in issue #27.NOW, kicks off the "Goblin Nation" storyline, which pits the Superior Spider-Man against the new Green Goblin and the criminal army that he's quietly been assembling. Slott said, "We're heading toward the "Goblin Nation" story where we'll see what happens now after the rise of Spider-Man's greatest enemy, the Green Goblin and what happens with Otto Octavius, the Superior Spider-Man. Because let's be honest. He's fought characters like Cardiac, Screwball and Stunner. [But] This is the Green Goblin! Has everything you've seen this so-called 'Superior' Spider-Man do risen to the level of the Green Goblin?"
Thor: God of Thunder 19–25	February 2014 – September 2014	Writer; Jason Aaron; Artist; Esad Ribic	Starting with issue #19.NOW, begins the first in a five-part saga. Aaron said, "We see Thor fighting to save the Earth on two different fronts. In the present, he's working with S.H.I.E.L.D. to take on the all-new Roxxon, the world's biggest and more nefarious energy corporation. In the far future, King Thor runs up against a very old and very hungry Galactus."
Thunderbolts 20–32	February 2014 – October 2014	Writer; Charles Soule; Artist; Carlo Barberi	Starting in issue #20.NOW, Ghost Rider joins the team. Soule said, "Part of the reason to include Ghost Rider is simple — why wouldn't you put Ghost Rider into a book? He also fits into the book's dynamic very nicely. Johnny Blaze is certainly someone who has his own demons to battle (yes, that was completely intentional), just like the other members of the Thunderbolts team. I also like that his powers have a magical aspect. Most of the other 'Bolts are either soldiers or warriors, and so putting someone on the team who can cast spells and such opens up some fun story options."
Uncanny Avengers (vol. 1) 18–25 annual 1	March 2014 – October 2014	Writer; Rick Remender; Artist; Steve Mcniven	Starting with issue #18.NOW, the series begins a new storyline titled "Planet X". Remender said, "The conclusion of 'Ragnarok Now' is pretty shocking, I think. What we have going into the 'Planet X' of it all is that there's some form of a mutant homeworld established in space. That's the big 'Shazam!' that I don't think we're able to promote this without giving away that much. As for what is going on on this planet, I think this is going to be an examination of what happens when the mutants get everything they think they wanted, even if they didn't put it together. Seeing them in this utopia where there are no humans, except for Wasp, they begin to break into factions, and they continue to have problems and strife. It turns out that the problem is a human problem, and it's one they'll have whether they're on Earth or not."
Uncanny X-Men 19–35 600 special 1 annual 1	March 2014 – present	Writer; Brian Bendis; Artist; Chris Bachalo	Starting with issue #19.NOW, Cyclops leads his team against S.H.I.E.L.D., which was revealed to have their own Sentinels in the "Battle of the Atom" storyline. Bendis said, "I think it's a bigger risk for him at this point not to take on S.H.I.E.L.D. Something's wrong over there and their lives are in danger. He made a promise both publicly and privately to his people that he would fight for them and protect them. Something is going on [at S.H.I.E.L.D.] that is putting mutant lives in danger. One would have to imagine that it's better to be alive than have goodwill."
X-Men 10–26	February 2014 – present	Writer; Brian Wood; Artist; Kris Anka	Starting with issue #10.NOW., the series begins a three-issue story-arc entitled "Ghosts" that involves the new Sisterhood that was introduced in the "Muertas" storyline, which includes Lady Deathstrike, Typhoid Mary, the Enchantress, and a powerful unnamed villain.

==== Limited Series ====
Title	Publication Date	Initial Creative Team	Notes / References
All-New Doop 1–5	April 2014 – August 2014	Writer; Peter Milligan; Artist; David Lafuente	Milligan summarized the five-issue limited series with "Doop is a character who lives mostly in the margins, and this story takes place, if you like, in the margins of Battle of the Atom. It shows what happens in those moments just before or after or behind the main storyline."
Deadly Hands of Kung-Fu 1–4	May 2014 – August 2014	Writer; Mike Benson; Artist; Tan Eng Huat	In the four-issue limited series, "a highly trained MI-6 agent has been murdered in cold blood. One with deep, personal ties to Shang-Chi's past. As he journey's to England to pay his respects, the Marvel Universe's most impressive hand-to-hand combatant will learn that not all is as it seems. And if he's not careful – he'll be next! Familiar faces and new enemies lie around every twist and turn, as Shang-Chi makes his lone stand against the dangerous unknown."
Winter Soldier: The Bitter March 1–5	February 2014 – July 2014	Writer; Rick Remender; Artist; Roland Boschi	In the five-issue limited series, set in 1966, two ex-Nazi scientists have developed a top-secret formula that could potentially win the Cold War, but they have been captured by Hydra. In response, S.H.I.E.L.D. sends in Nick Fury and Ran Shen to collect the scientists, however the Soviet Union sends in the Winter Soldier to try to get them first. About the title character Remender said, "He was a tool who had very little control of his own mind, but I will be exploring how Bucky Barnes is underneath all of it still. Even back then, there was a piece of him trying to stand back up."

==== One-shots ====
Title	Publication Date	Initial Creative Team	Notes / References
All-New Marvel Now! Point One	January 2014	Writer various Artist various	The issue features lead-in stories for Loki: Agent of Asgard, Silver Surfer, Black Widow, Ms. Marvel, All-New Invaders and Avengers World.
Free Comic Book Day 2014 (Guardians of the Galaxy)	May 2014	Writer; Brian Bendis; Artist; Nick Bradshaw	In the issue, released for Free Comic Book Day, Captain Marvel and Venom join the Guardians of the Galaxy.
Free Comic Book Day 2014 (Rocket Raccoon)	May 2014	Writer; Joe Caramagna; Artist; Adam Archer	A free all-ages comic book starring Rocket Raccoon by the creative team of Joe Caramagna and Adam Archer. About the team, editor Mark Paniccia said, "Joe Caramagna is our premier all-ages writer. Adam Archer is a prolific artist with an energetic and dynamic style. Great expressions and comedic timing. He was born to draw bipedal, ray gun toting raccoons!"

=== Avengers Now! ===
==== New on-going series / volumes ====
Title	Publication Date	Initial Creative Team	Notes / References
All-New Captain America 1–6 special 1	January 2015 – June 2015	Writer; Rick Remender; Artist; Stuart Immonen	In the series, Sam Wilson takes over the mantle of Captain America from Steve Rogers. Series editor Tom Brevoort said, "While Sam shares many of Steve's beliefs in a general sense, he's also a very different person with a very different background. He didn't grow up in the 1930s, he's a modern day man in touch with the problems of the 21st Century. For most of his professional life, Sam has worked as a social worker, so he's seen the worst of urban society up close, and how crime, poverty, lack of social structure and opportunity can affect the community."
Angela: Asgard's Assassin 1–6	February 2015 – July 2015	Writer; Kieron Gillen & Marguerite Bennett; Artist; Phil Jimenez & Stephanie Hans	Gillen said, "Angela is almost an Asgardian Black Widow, and I mean at all levels. We're looking at how someone like that would operate in Asgard. The Avengers movie popularized the 'red in the ledger' aspect to Black Widow. Angela almost has that as a religion. She is someone who is religiously, kind of like in a D&D Paladin way, obsessed with the concept of debt. The idea of her owing anyone anything or someone owing her something and the debt not being repaid is traumatic to her. That's kind of the core character thing for her; what she owes people and what they owe her. Of course there's an especially interesting drive to the story when she owes other people things. That's kind of the heart of it for me. She's gone through this really big change that makes her question all of these debts. Makes her ask, 'What do I owe all these people?'"
Ant-Man 1–5 annual 1	January 2015 – September 2015	Writer; Nick Spencer; Artist; Ramon Rosanas	The series explores Scott Lang's relationship with his daughter Cassie Lang. Spencer explained, "The darkness around Scott's life is starting to lift. Cassie Lang is going to be coming back... Scott is going to get a new shot at being a dad." Spencer stated that Scott being a "superhero single dad" was a big part of his pitch for the series because "[Cassie is] such an integral part of who Scott is as a character."
Bucky Barnes: The Winter Soldier 1–11	October 2014 – November 2015	Writer; Ales Kot; Artist; Marco Rudy	Kot said, "Bucky Barnes has undergone self-numbing amounts of traumatic experiences. He killed for the Soviets. He killed for Americans. He had people taken away from him by rather brutal means. He had his mind wiped out. Repeatedly. To top that, he's hyper-competent when it comes to hurting people and he barely had a childhood. So: a lot of damage. A lot of carefully developed survival mechanisms. The thing about them, though? They might have been important once, but now—well, many of them might be no longer necessary. Bucky is entering a completely new phase of his life and it is a deeply expansive one. Shedding the old and embracing the new is the core of the character and the series – traveling across galaxies as a very capable and damaged ex-mercenary, having experiences you can't fit into your established worldview, changing in the process."
Captain America and the Mighty Avengers 1–9	November 2014 – August 2015	Writer; Al Ewing; Artist; Luke Ross	The series examines changes the team will face given Sam Wilson's new role as Captain America. Ewing said, "As I was writing this, it occurred to me that the general public probably see Sam as team leader now, in the field — he's Captain America, right? So how does that make Monica [Rambeau] feel? Especially since a threat is coming up from behind that only she's had serious experience with? Can she trust the team to follow her orders in the crunch instead of the man in the stars and stripes?"
Deathlok 1–10	October 2014 – September 2015	Writer; Nathan Edmondson; Artist; Mike Perkins	The series focuses on a new Deathlok named Henry Hayes. Edmondson said, "[Hayes] is a father and a medic who doesn't know that he's a machine, a killer behind some of the sweeping changes in geopolitics." Edmondson described the series as The Manchurian Candidate meets RoboCop.
Superior Iron Man 1–9	January 2015 – August 2015	Writer; Tom Taylor; Artist; Yildiray Cinar	In the series, Iron Man relocates his base of operations to San Francisco and receives a new set of armor. Marvel editor-in-chief Axel Alonso said, "The newly-transformed Superior Iron Man has very ambitious plans for the city that some of its residents embrace, but not all. Like the Superior Spider-Man, Superior Iron Man is a character that's hard to root for."
Thor 1–8 annual 1	October 2014 – present	Writer; Jason Aaron; Artist; Russell Dauterman	The series features a female character in the role of Thor after the classic hero is no longer able to wield Mjolnir. Aaron stated that "this is not She-Thor. This is not Lady Thor. This is not Thorita. This is Thor. This is the Thor of the Marvel Universe. But it's unlike any Thor we've ever seen before."
The Unbeatable Squirrel Girl 1–8	January 2015	Writer; Ryan North; Artist; Erica Henderson	North said, "Doreen is in this interesting place. She's defeated Doctor Doom, Thanos, tons of the really heavy-hitters, but really – who knows about that? To the general public, if they know about her at all, she's just a lady who dresses up like a rodent and fights crime in Central Park. And that's great – she loves fighting crime! – but she's also not sure she's living up to her full potential. So she decides to make some changes in her life and go to college... There's the life changes of moving into a dorm when your best friend is a squirrel, but there's also some villains that show up and threaten her pretty directly. It's that classic "girl meets squirrel, girl and squirrel go to school and defeat supervillains" story."
Uncanny Avengers (vol. 2) 1–5	January 2015	Writer; Rick Remender; Artist; Daniel Acuña	The story picks up after the first volume with the team shattered and leaders Havok and Captain America off the team. Remender said, "The idea for the time being, right now, is that Rogue and Scarlet Witch have earned a sisterhood and they've earned each other's trust; they're the lynchpins of the Unity Squad at this point. They've come through it all and learned the most. Their friendship was one of the main points of the first story, and they're co-leaders when we open."
Wolverines 1–20	January 2015	Writer; Various; Artist; Various	In the series, Mystique, X-23, Daken, Sabretooth, and Lady Deathstrike come together to investigate the death of Wolverine. Co-writer Ray Fawkes said, In a way, most of the characters featured in Wolverines are incomplete reflections of Wolverine. Perhaps now that he's gone, they are free to fully realize themselves? Or maybe they'll be annihilated by the void that he's left behind?"

==== Other on-going series ====
Title	Publication Date	Initial Creative Team	Notes / References
Hulk 5–16	August 2014 – July 2015	Writer; Gerry Duggan; Artist; Mark Bagley	Starting with #5, the series begins a story-arc titled "The Omega Hulk", in which the Hulk will try to put an end to gamma-powered individuals – including friends and relatives like She-Hulk.

=== Marvel Now! 2.0 ===
==== New on-going series / volumes ====
Title	Publication Date	Initial Creative Team	Notes / References
All-New Guardians of the Galaxy FCBD 1–12, Annual #1	May 2017 – October 2017	Writer; Gerry Duggan; Artist; Aaron Kuder	Continues with Guardians of the Galaxy #146 on Marvel Legacy.
Amazing Spider-Man: Renew Your Vows 1–12	November 2016 – October 2017	Writer; Gerry Conway; Artist; Ryan Stegman	Continues with Amazing Spider-Man: Renew Your Vows #13 on Marvel Legacy.
America 1–7	March 2017 – September 2017	Writer; Gabby Rivera; Artist; Joe Quinones	Continues with America #8 on Marvel Legacy.
Astonishing X-Men 1–6	July 2017 – December 2017	Writer; Charles Soule; Artist; Various	Continues with Astonishing X-Men #7 on Marvel Legacy.
Avengers 1–11, 1.MU	November 2016 – September 2017	Writer; Mark Waid; Artist; Mike del Mundo	Continues with Avengers #672 on Marvel Legacy.
Ben Reilly: Scarlet Spider 1–9	April 2017 – October 2017	Writer; Peter David; Artist; Mark Bagley	Continues with Ben Reilly: The Scarlet Spider #10 on Marvel Legacy.
Black Bolt 1–7	May 2017 – November 2017	Writer; Saladin Ahmed; Artist; Christian Ward	Continues with Black Bolt #8 on Marvel Legacy.
Black Panther: World of Wakanda 1–6	November 2016 – April 2017	Writer; Roxane Gay & Ta-Nehishi Coates; Artist; Alitha E. Martinez	
Black Panther and the Crew 1–6	April 2017 – August 2017	Writer; Ta-Nehishi Coates & Yona Harvey; Artist; Butch Guice	
Cable 1–5	May 2017 – September 2017	Writer; James Robinson; Artist; Carlos Pacheco	Continues with Cable #150 on Marvel Legacy.
Champions 1–12	October 2016 – November 2017	Writer; Mark Waid; Artist; Humberto Ramos	Continues with Champions #13 on Marvel Legacy.
Defenders 1–5	June 2017 – September 2017	Writer; Brian Michael Bendis; Artist; David Marquez	Continues with Defenders #6 on Marvel Legacy.
Doctor Strange and the Sorcerers Supreme 1–12	October 2016 – September 2017	Writer; Robbie Thompson; Artist; Javier Rodriguez	
Elektra 1–5	February 2017 – June 2017	Writer; Matt Owens; Artist; Alec Morgan	
Foolkiller 1–5	November 2016 – March 2017	Writer; Max Bemis; Artist; Dalibor Talajic	
Gamora 1–5	December 2016 – April 2017	Writer; Nicole Perlman; Artist; Francesco Mattina	
Generation X 1–9	May 2017 – November 2017	Writer; Christina Strain; Artist; Amilcar Pinna	Continues with Generation X #85 on Marvel Legacy.
Ghost Rider 1–5	November 2016 – March 2017	Writer; Felipe Smith; Artist; Danilo Beyruth	
Great Lakes Avengers 1–7	October 2016 – April 2017	Writer; Zac Gorman; Artist; Will Robson	
Hawkeye 1–12	December 2016 – November 2017	Writer; Kelly Thompson; Artist; Leonardo Romero	Continues with Hawkeye #13 on Marvel Legacy.
Hulk 1–11	December 2016 – October 2017	Writer; Mariko Tamaki; Artist; Nico Leon	Continues with She-Hulk #159 on Marvel Legacy.
I Am Groot 1–5	May 2017 – September 2017	Writer; Christopher Hastings; Artist; Flaviano	
Iceman 1–5	June 2017 – September 2017	Writer; Sina Grace; Artist; Alessandro Vitti	Continues with Iceman #6 on Marvel Legacy.
Infamous Iron Man 1–12	October 2016 – September 2017	Writer; Brian Michael Bendis; Artist; Alex Maleev	
Invincible Iron Man 1–11	November 2016 – September 2017	Writer; Brian Michael Bendis; Artist; Stefano Caselli	Continues with Invincible Iron Man #593 on Marvel Legacy.
Iron Fist 1–7	March 2017 – September 2017	Writer; Ed Brisson; Artist; Mike Perkins	Continues with Iron Fist #73 on Marvel Legacy.
Iron Fists	Postponed	Writer; Kaare Andrews; Artist; Afu Chan	Was later released as a ComiXology exclusive limited series titled Immortal Iron Fists.
Jean Grey 1–7	May 2017 – September 2017	Writer; Dennis Hopeless; Artist; Victor Ibanez	Continues with Jean Grey #8 on Marvel Legacy.
Jessica Jones 1–12	October 2016 – September 2017	Writer; Brian Michael Bendis; Artist; Michael Gaydos	Continues with Jessica Jones #13 on Marvel Legacy.
Kingpin 1–5	February 2017 – June 2017	Writer; Matthew Rosenberg; Artist; Ben Torres	
Luke Cage 1–5	May 2017 – September 2017	Writer; David Walker; Artist; Nelson Blake II	Continues with Luke Cage #166 on Marvel Legacy.
The Mighty Captain Marvel 0–9	January 2017 – September 2017	Writer; Margaret Stohl; Artist; Ramon Rosanas	Was originally to be titled Captain Marvel. Continues with Captain Marvel #125 on Marvel Legacy.
Monsters Unleashed 1–6	April 2017 – September 2017	Writer; Cullen Bunn; Artist; David Baldeon	Continues with Monsters Unleashed #7 on Marvel Legacy.
Mosaic 1–8	October 2016 – May 2017	Writer; Geoffrey Thorne; Artist; Khary Randolph	
Nick Fury 1–6	April 2017 – September 2017	Writer; James Robinson; Artist; ACO	
Nova 1–7	December 2016 – June 2017	Writer; Jeff Loveness; Artist; Ramon Perez	
Occupy Avengers 1–9	November 2016 – July 2017	Writer; David Walker; Artist; Gabriel Walta	
Peter Parker: The Spectacular Spider-Man 1–6	June 2017 – November 2017	Writer; Chip Zdarsky; Artist; Adam Kubert	Continues with Peter Parker: The Spectacular Spider-Man #297 on Marvel Legacy.
Prowler 1–6	October 2016 – March 2017	Writer; Sean Ryan; Artist; Jamal Campbell	
Rocket 1–6	May 2017 – October 2017	Writer; Al Ewing; Artist; Mike Mayhew	
Rocket Raccoon 1–5	December 2016 – April 2017	Writer; Matthew Rosenberg; Artist; Jorge Coelho	
Royals 1–8	April 2017 – September 2017	Writer; Al Ewing; Artist; Jonboy Meyers	Continues with Royals #9 on Marvel Legacy.
Runaways 1–38	September 2017 – August 2021	Writer; Rainbow Rowell; Artist; Kris Anka	
Secret Warriors 1–7	May 2017 – October 2017	Writer; Matthew Rosenberg; Artist; Javier Garron	Continues with Secret Warriors #8 on Marvel Legacy.
Slapstick 1–6	December 2016 – May 2017	Writer; Reilly Brown & Fred Van Lente; Artist; Reilly Brown & Mike Norton	
Solo 1–5	October 2016 – February 2017	Writer; Gerry Duggan & Geoffrey Thorne; Artist; Paco Diaz	
Star-Lord 1–6, Annual	December 2016 – May 2017	Writer; Chip Zdarsky; Artist; Kris Anka	
Thanos 1–12	November 2016 – October 2017	Writer; Jeff Lemire; Artist; Mike Deodato	Continues with Thanos #13 on Marvel Legacy.
U.S.Avengers 1–10	December 2016 – November 2017	Writer; Al Ewing; Artist; Paco Medina	Continues with U.S.Avengers #11 on Marvel Legacy.
Ultimates 2 1–9, 100	November 2016 – August 2017	Writer; Al Ewing; Artist; Travel Foreman	
Venom 1–6, 150–154	November 2016 – September 2017	Writer; Mike Costa; Artist; Gerardo Sandoval	Continues with Venom #155 on Marvel Legacy.
Unstoppable Wasp 1–8	January 2017 – August 2017	Writer; Jeremy Whitley; Artist; Elsa Charretier	
Weapon X 1–11	April 2017 – November 2017	Writer; Greg Pak; Artist; Greg Land	Continues with Weapon X #12 on Marvel Legacy.
X-Men Blue 1–12	April 2017 – September 2017	Writer; Cullen Bunn; Artist; Jorge Molina	Continues with X-Men Blue #13 on Marvel Legacy.
X-Men Gold 1–12	April 2017 – September 2017	Marc Guggenheim; Artist; Ardian Syaf	Continues with X-Men Gold #13 on Marvel Legacy.

==== Other on-going series ====
Title	Publication Date	Initial Creative Team	Notes / References
Black Panther 7–18	October 2016 – September 2017	Writer; Ta-Nehisi Coates; Artist; Chris Sprouse	Continues with Black Panther #166 on Marvel Legacy.
Black Widow 7–12	October 2016 – March 2017	Writer; Mark Waid; Artist; Chris Samnee	
Captain America: Sam Wilson 14–24	October 2016 – July 2017	Writer; Nick Spencer; Artist; Daniel Acuña	Continues with Captain America #25
Captain America: Steve Rogers 7–19	November 2016 – July 2017	Writer; Nick Spencer; Artist; Jesus Saiz	Continues with Captain America #25
Daredevil 15–28	January 2017 – October 2017	Writer; Charles Soule; Artist; Ron Garney	Continues with Daredevil #595 on Marvel Legacy.
Deadpool 21–36	October 2016 – September 2017	Writer; Gerry Duggan; Artist; Mike Hawthorne	
Deadpool & The Mercs for Money 4-10	October 2016 – April 2017	Writer; Cullen Bunn; Artist; Salva Espin	
Doctor Strange 12–26, #1.MU	October 2016 – October 2017	Writer; Jason Aaron; Artist; Chris Bachalo	Continues with Doctor Strange #381 on Marvel Legacy.
Guardians of the Galaxy 15–19, #1.MU	December 2016 – April 2017	Writer; Brian Michael Bendis; Artist; Valerio Schitti	
Moon Knight 10–14	January 2017 – May 2017	Writer; Jeff Lemire; Artist; Greg Smallwood	
Mighty Thor 15–23	January 2017 – September 2017	Writer; Jason Aaron; Artist; Russell Dauterman	Continues with Mighty Thor #700 on Marvel Legacy.
Moon Girl And Devil Dinosaur 13–24	October 2016 – October 2017	Writer; Amy Reeder and Brandon Montclare; Artist; Natacha Bustos	Continues with Moon Girl And Devil Dinosaur #25 on Marvel Legacy.
Ms. Marvel 12–24	October 2016 – November 2017	Writer; G. Willow Wilson; Artist; Takeshi Miyazawa and Adrian Alphona	Continues with Ms. Marvel #25 on Marvel Legacy.
Patsy Walker, A.K.A. Hellcat! 11–17	October 2016 – April 2017	Writer; Kate Leth; Artist; Brittney L. Williams	
Power Man and Iron Fist 10–15, Annual #1	November 2016 – April 2017	Writer; David Walker; Artist; Sanford Greene	
The Punisher 7–17	November 2016 – October 2017	Writer; Becky Cloonan; Artist; Steve Dillon	Continues with The Punisher #218 on Marvel Legacy.
Silk 14–19	November 2016 – April 2017	Writer; Robbie Thompson; Artist; Tana Ford	
Silver Surfer 9–14	November 2016 – August 2017	Writer; Dan Slott; Artist; Mike Allred	
Spider-Gwen 16–24	January 2017 – September 2017	Writer; Jason Latour; Artist; Robbi Rodriguez	Spider-Gwen #16 did not carry the "Marvel Now!" logo, but the cover was the one on Marvel Previews. Continues with Spider-Gwen #25 on Marvel Legacy.
Spider-Man 12–21	January 2017 – October 2017	Writer; Brian Michael Bendis; Artist; Sara Pichelli	Continues with Spider-Man #234 on Marvel Legacy.
Spider-Man 2099	Cancelled?	Writer; Peter David; Artist; Will Sliney	While #21 was supposed to appear on Marvel Now! 2.0, no issue carried the "Marvel Now!" logo and the preview cover appeared only on #25, the final issue of the series,
Spider-Woman 13–17	November 2016 – March 2017	Writer; Dennis Hopeless; Artist; Javier Rodriguez	
Squadron Supreme	Cancelled?	Writer; James Robinson; Artist; Leonard Kirk	While #13 was supposed to appear on Marvel Now! 2.0, it did not carry the "Marvel Now!" logo, and the series was cancelled at #15.
Thunderbolts 7–12	November 2016 – April 2017	Writer; Jim Zub; Artist; Jon Malin	
Totally Awesome Hulk 15–23, #1.MU	January 2017 – September 2017	Writer; Greg Pak; Artist	Continues with The Incredible Hulk #709 on Marvel Legacy.
The Unbeatable Squirrel Girl 16–26	January 2017 – November 2017	Writer; Ryan North; Artist; Erica Henderson	Continues with The Unbeatable Squirrel Girl #27 on Marvel Legacy.
The Unbelievable Gwenpool 7–20	October 2016 – September 2017	Writer; Christopher Hastings; Artist; GuriHiru	Continues with The Unbelievable Gwenpool #21 on Marvel Legacy.
Uncanny Avengers 15–27	October 2016 – September 2017	Writer; Gerry Duggan; Artist; Pepe Larraz	Continues with Uncanny Avengers #28 on Marvel Legacy.
Uncanny Inhumans 15–20, #1.MU	October 2016 – March 2017	Writer; Charles Soule; Artist; Steve McNiven	

==== Limited series ====
Title	Publication Date	Initial Creative Team	Notes / References
Avengers #1.1–5.1	November 2016 – March 2017	Writer; Mark Waid; Artist; Barry Kitson	
Bullseye 1–5	February 2017 – June 2017	Writer; Ed Brisson; Artist; Guillermo Sanna	
Cage! 1–4	October 2016 – January 2017	Writer; Genndy Tartakovsky; Artist; Genndy Tartakovsky	
The Clone Conspiracy 1–5	October 2016 – February 2017	Writer; Dan Slott; Artist; Jim Cheung	
Death of X 1–4	October 2016 – November 2016	Writer; Jeff Lemire & Charles Soule; Artist; Aaron Kuder	
Deadpool Kills the Marvel Universe Again 1–5	July 2017 – September 2017	Writer; Cullen Bunn; Artist; Dalibor Talajić	
Deadpool the Duck 1–5	January 2017 – March 2017	Writer; Stuart Moore; Artist; Jacopo Camagni	
Deadpool vs. The Punisher 1–5	April 2017 – June 2017	Writer; Fred Van Lente; Artist; Pere Perez	
Deadpool vs Old Man Logan 1–5	October 2017 – February 2018	Writer; Declan Shalvey; Artist; Mike Henderson	
Edge of Venomverse 1–5	June 2017 – August 2017	Writer; Various; Artist; Various	Prelude to the Venomverse Storyline.
Guardians of the Galaxy: Mother Entropy 1–5	May 2017 – May 2017	Writer; Jim Starlin; Artist; Alan Davis	
Inhumans: Once and Future Kings 1–5	August 2017 – December 2017	Writer; Christopher J. Priest & Ryan North; Artist; Phil Noto & Gustavo Duarte	
IVX 0–6	November 2016 – March 2017	Writer; Jeff Lemire & Charles Soule; Artist; Leinil Francis Yu	
Man-Thing 1–5	March 2017 – June 2017	Writer; R.L. Stine; Artist; German Peralta & Daniel Johnson	
Monsters Unleashed 1–5	January 2017 – March 2017	Writer; Cullen Bunn; Artist; Various	
Punisher MAX: The Platoon 1–6	October 2017 – February 2018	Writer; Garth Ennis; Artist; Goran Parlov	
Secret Empire FCBD, 0–10	April 2017 – August 2017	Writer; Nick Spencer; Artist; Various	Main series of the Secret Empire storyline.
Secret Empire: Brave New World 1–5	June 2017 – August 2017	Writer; Various; Artist; Various	Part of the Secret Empire storyline.
Spider-Men II 1–5	July 2017 – November 2017	Writer; Brian Michael Bendis; Artist; Sara Pichelli	
The Unworthy Thor 1–5	November 2016 – March 2017	Writer; Jason Aaron; Artist; Olivier Coipel	
Venomverse 1–5	September 2017 – October 2017	Writer; Cullen Bunn; Artist; Iban Coello	Main series of the Venomverse Storyline.

==== One-shots ====
Title	Publication Date	Initial Creative Team	Notes / References
Civil War II: The Oath	January 2017	Writer; Nick Spencer; Artist; Rod Reis	Part of the Civil War II storyline.
The Clone Conspiracy: Omega	March 2017	Writer; Dan Slott, Christos Gage & Peter David; Artist; Cory Smith, Mark Bagley & Stuart Immonen	Epilogue of The Clone Conspiracy storyline.
Gwenpool Holiday Special: Merry Mix Up	December 2016	Writer; Various; Artist; Various	
Inhumans Prime	March 2017	Writer; Al Ewing; Artist; Ryan Sook	Beginning of the ResurrXion event.
Marvel Legacy	September 2017	Writer; Jason Aaron; Artist; Esad Ribic	Introduction issue for the Marvel Legacy brand.
Secret Empire: Omega	September 2017	Writer; Nick Spencer; Artist; Andrea Sorrentino	Aftermath of the Secret Empire storyline.
Secret Empire: Underground	June 2017	Writer; Jeremy Whitley; Artist; Eric Koda	Part of the Secret Empire storyline.
Secret Empire: United	June 2017	Writer; Jim Zub; Artist; Ario Anindito	Part of the Secret Empire storyline.
Secret Empire: Uprising	June 2017	Writer; Derek Landy; Artist; Joshua Cassara	Part of the Secret Empire storyline.
Spider-Man: Master Plan	July 2017	Writer; Robbie Thompson; Artist; Nate Stockman	Including a special reprinting of The Amazing Spider-Man #2 featuring the first appearance of Vulture.
Thor: Where Walk the Frost Giants	October 2017	Writer; Ralph Macchio; Artist; Todd Nauck	
Venomverse: War Stories	September 2017	Writer; Various; Artist; Various	Part of the Venomverse Storyline.
Weapons of Mutant Destruction: Alpha	June 2017	Writer; Greg Pak; Artist; Mahmud Asrar	
X-Men Prime	March 2017	Writer; Marc Guggenheim; Artist; Ken Lashley	Beginning of the ResurrXion event.

== In other media ==
- On December 13, 2012, a special "Marvel Now!" category was featured on the television quiz show, Jeopardy!
- A costume based on the Marvel Now! title Indestructible Hulk was made available in the game Marvel Super Hero Squad Online in November 2012.

== See also ==
- All-New, All-Different Marvel
- Marvel Legacy
