= Marvel Legacy =

Comic book line introduced in 2017

- Cover of Marvel Legacy #1 (September 2017) featuring Captain America, Iron Man, Spider-Man, Captain Marvel, Ant-Man, Wasp, Hulk, Thor, Scarlet Witch, Black Widow, Black Panther, Doctor Strange, Lockjaw, Daredevil, and Storm. Art by Joe Quesada.

Publication information
- Publisher: Marvel Comics
- Genre: Superhero
- Publication date: September 2017 – June 2018
- Main character: Marvel Universe

Creative team
- Written by: Various
- Artist: Various

Marvel Legacy is a 2017–18 relaunch of a line of American comic books published by Marvel Comics. It is concurrent with All-New, All-Different Marvel and Marvel NOW! 2.0.

== Publication history ==
On April 22, 2017, Marvel Comics announced Marvel Legacy at the Chicago Comic & Entertainment Expo. The goal of the Legacy initiative was to bring a greater focus to Marvel's core superheroes, unlike recent relaunches such as Marvel NOW!, which gave prominence to newer and younger heroes. Marvel Entertainment's chief creative officer Joe Quesada stated that company was embracing their roots with the creation of this new comic book line. Marvel Comics' editor-in-chief Axel Alonso noted that the relaunch was about reminding readers of the company's rich history by highlighting the connections between characters and reintroducing some iconic characters.

The relaunch began in September 2017 following the conclusion of the Secret Empire and Generations storylines with the release of a 50-page one-shot titled Marvel Legacy #1. Writer Jason Aaron and artist Esad Ribić collaborated on the opening issue and laid the narrative groundwork for the line. The issue introduces the first super hero team of Avengers that were active in the year 1,000,000 BC. The story spans the history of the Marvel Universe and explores the connection between the prehistoric Avengers and their present-day counterparts. Quesada teased the cover artwork for the opening issue, hinting at the possible return of Bruce Banner as Hulk and Tony Stark as Iron Man, Thor Odinson reclaiming Mjolnir, and the appearance of other superheroes in their classic costumes.

The series also sees the return of the original Wolverine after his initial death, with three Marvel Legacy titles: Captain America, The Amazing Spider-Man and The Mighty Thor, each with a Marvel Cinematic Universe-style post-credit scene; he also shows up alongside Captain Marvel and Star-Lord as one of the holders of the Infinity Gems in a crossover event. In addition, the original Jean Grey returns in her own limited series titled Phoenix Resurrection: The Return of Jean Grey in December. This was followed by X-Men Red, which sees Jean establish her own team of X-Men that consists of the new Wolverine, Nightcrawler, Namor the Sub-Mariner, Gabby Kinney (the new Wolverine's clone), Trinary (a new character), and Gentle (a mutant from Wakanda), and later by the Cajun mutant Gambit. Marvel Legacy #1 also brings Franklin and Valeria Richards back to the Marvel Universe. Marvel Two-in-One (a series featuring the Thing teaming up with other superheroes) was revived with Thing's best friend Human Torch being the guest in the storyline "Fate of the Four", which focuses on both heroes trying to solve the mystery of Reed and Sue's disappearances, hinting at a possible Fantastic Four reunion.

Following the release of Marvel Legacy #1, many Marvel comic series reverted to their classic cumulative numbering system. For their relaunching series, Marvel created a new and consistent cover design that aimed to recapture their work from the 1980s and 1990s. Marvel released limited quantities of lenticular covers for their Marvel Legacy titles that pay homage to older covers. They also reintroduced elements such as the Marvel Value Stamp—a collectable clip-and-save program—and the self-published fanzine FOOM. Marvel included three-page primer stories in select Legacy titles to provide background information on their characters for new readers. Written by Robbie Thompson and illustrated by Mark Bagley, the primer stories covered classic moments from Marvel's comics.

The Legacy initiative was succeeded by Fresh Start, a line-wide relaunch by Marvel Comics in mid 2018.

== Ongoing series ==
In June and July 2017, Marvel revealed the 54 series that make up the Marvel Legacy initiative.

Title	Legacy Starting #	Writer(s)	Artist(s)	Storyline	Ref.
All-New Wolverine	#25–35	Tom Taylor	Juann Cabal	Orphans of X #25–30 Old Woman Laura #33-35	
Amazing Spider-Man	#789–801 Annual 42	Dan Slott	Stuart Immonen	Fall of Parker #789–791, Venom Inc. #792–793, Threat Level: Red #794–796, Go Down Swinging #797–800	
Amazing Spider-Man: Renew Your Vows	#13-23	Jody Houser	Nick Roche	8 Years Later #13–15, Fast Times At Midtown High #16–18 Parker Summer Vacation #19 Weird Science #20-23	
America	#8–12	Gabby Rivera	Joe Quinones	Exterminatrix 8–10	
Astonishing X-Men	#7-17 Annual #1	Charles Soule	Phil Noto	A Man Called X 7-12 Until Our Hearts Stop 13-14	
Avengers	#672–690	Mark Waid	Jesús Saiz	Worlds Collide 672–674 Avengers No Surrender 675-690	
Ben Reilly: Scarlet Spider	#10-25	Peter David	Will Sliney	The Slingers Return 10–13, Bad To The Bone 14, Damnation 15–17	
Black Bolt	#8–12	Saladin Ahmed	Christian Ward	The Midnight King Returns to Earth 8–11	
Black Panther	#166–172 Annual 1	Ta-Nehisi Coates	Leonard Kirk	Klaw Stands Supreme166–172	
Cable	#150-159	Ed Brisson	Jon Malin	The Newer Mutants 150–154 Past Fears 155-159	
Captain America	#695–704	Mark Waid	Chris Samnee	Home of the Brave 695–697 Out of Time 698-700 Promised Land 701-704	
Captain Marvel	#125–129	Margaret Stohl	Michele Bandini	Dark Origin 125–129	
Champions	#13-27 Annual #1	Mark Waid	Humberto Ramos	Worlds Collide 13–15, Champion for a day 16–18 Northern Lights 19-21	
Daredevil	#595-612 Annual #1	Charles Soule	Stefano Landini	Mayor Fisk 595–600 Mayor Murdock 601-605	
Defenders	#6–10	Brian Michael Bendis	David Marquez	KIngpins of New York 6–10	
Despicable Deadpool	#287–300	Gerry Duggan	Scott Koblish	Deadpool Kills Cable 287–291 Bucket List 292-296 The Marvel Universe Kills Deadpool 297-300	
Doctor Strange	#381–390	Donny Cates	Steve Ditko	Loki: Sorcerer Supreme 381–385 Damnation 386-389	
Falcon	#1-8	Rodney Barnes	Joshua Cassara	Take Flight 1–5 Vampires in Brooklyn 6-8	
Generation X	#85–87	Christina Strain	Amilcar Pinna	Survival of the Fittest 85–87	
Guardians of the Galaxy	#146–150	Gerry Duggan	Marcus To	Infinity Quest 146–150	
Hawkeye	#13–16	Kelly Thompson	Leonardo Romero	Family Reunion 13–16	
Iceman	#6–11	Sina Grace	Robert Gill	Champions Reassembled 6–7 Iceman vs. Iceman 8 Apocalypse Seed 9-10	
Incredible Hulk	#709–717	Greg Pak	Greg Land	Return to Planet Hulk 709–713 World War Hulk 714-717	
Invincible Iron Man	#593–600	Brian Michael Bendis	Stefano Caselli	The Search for Tony Stark 593–600	
Iron Fist	#73-80	Ed Brisson	Mike Perkins	Sabretooth: Round Two 73–77 Damnation 78-80	
Jean Grey	#8–11	Dennis Hopeless	Victor Ibanez	Pysch War 8–11	
Jessica Jones	#13-18	Brian Michael Bendis	Michael Gaydos	Return of the Purple Man 13–17 The Big Goodbye 18	
Luke Cage	#166–170	David F. Walker	Nelson Blake	Caged! 166–170	
Marvel 2-in-One	#1-12 Annual 1	Chip Zdarsky	Jim Cheung	The Fate of the Four 1–6 Next of kin 7-10	
Mighty Thor	#700–706	Jason Aaron	Russell Dauterman	The Death of Mighty Thor 700–706	
Monsters Unleashed	#7-12	Cullen Bunn	Andrea Broccardo	And Lo There Came... A Poison! 7–8 Learning curve 9-12	
Moon Girl and Devil Dinosaur	#25-47	Brandon Montclare	Natacha Bustos	Fantastic Three 25–30 Save Our School 32-36	
Moon Knight	#188-200	Max Bemis	Jacen Burrows	Crazy Runs in the Family 188–193	
Ms. Marvel	#25-38	G. Willow Wilson	Nico Leon	Teenage Wasteland 25–28 Something New 29-30 Ratio 32-34	
Old Man Logan	#31-50	Ed Brisson	Mike Deodato	The Scarlet Samurai 31–33 Moon Over Madripoor 34-35 Moving Target 36-38 Glob Loves, Man Kills 39-40 Logan the Hunted 41-42 Bullseye Returns 43-45	
Peter Parker: The Spectacular Spider-Man	#297-313	Chip Zdarsky	Adam Kubert	Most Wanted 297–299, Amazing Fantasy 301–303 No More 304-305 Coming Home 306-307 Spider-Geddon 311-313	
The Punisher	#218-228	Matthew Rosenberg	Guiu Vilanova	Frank Castle: War Machine 218–223 Punisher War Criminal 224-228	
Royals	#9–12	Al Ewing	Javier Rodríguez	Fire From Heaven 9–12	
Secret Warriors	#8–12	Matthew Rosenberg	Javier Garrón and Will Robson	Vs Mister Sinister 8–12	
She-Hulk	#159–163	Mariko Tamaki	Jahnoy Lindsay	Jen Walters Must Die 159–163	
Spider-Gwen	#25-34	Jason Latour	Robbi Rodriguez	Gwenom 25–31 The Life of Gwen Stacy 30-33	
Spider-Man	#234–#240 Annual 1	Brian Michael Bendis	Oscar Bazaldua	Sinister Six Reborn 234–239	
Spider-Man/Deadpool (becomes Spider-Man vs. Deadpool)	#23-50	Robbie Thompson	Chris Bachalo	Arms Race 23-31, Oldies 26, 29, 32 Area 14 27-28, 30	
Tales of Suspense	#100-104	Matthew Rosenberg	Travel Foreman	Red Ledger 100-104	
Thanos	#13–18 Annual 1	Donny Cates	Geoff Shaw	Thanos Wins 13–18	
The Unbeatable Squirrel Girl	#27-50	Ryan North	Erica Henderson	The Forbidden Pla-Nut 27–30	
The Unbelievable Gwenpool	#21–25	Christopher Hastings	Irene Strychalski	Doom Sees You 21–23 Lost in the Plot 24-25	
U.S.Avengers	#11–12	Al Ewing	Paco Medina	Cannonball Run 11–12	
Uncanny Avengers	#28–30	Jim Zub	Sean Izaakse	Stars and Garters 28–30	
Venom	#155–165	Mike Costa	Mark Bagley	Lethal Protector 155–158 Venom Inc. 159-160 Tangled Webs 161 Poison X 162-163 The Nativity 164-165	
Weapon X	#12-27	Greg Pak	Yildiray Cinar	Nuke-Clear War 12–14 Happy Birthday, Old Man Logan 15-16 Sabretooth's in Charge 17-19 If He Dies, He Dies 20-21 Weapon X-Force 22-23	
X-Men: Blue	#13-36 Annual 1	Cullen Bunn	Jorge Molina	Mojo Worldwide #13–15; Cross Time Capers #16–20 Poison X 21-22 Cry Havok 23-28 Search for Jimmy Hudson 29-30 Kings and Queens 31-32 Surviving the Experience 33-36	
X-Men: Gold	#13-36 Annual 2	Marc Guggenheim	Jorge Molina	Mojo Worldwide #13–15; The Negative Zone War #16–20 Brotherhood 21-22 Cruel and Unusual 23-25 'Til Death Do Us part 26-30 Prestige Dark 31-32 Godwar 33-35	
X-Men: Red	#1-11 Annual #1	Tom Taylor	Mahmud Asrar	The Hate Machine 1-11	

== Legacy one-shots ==
In addition to their ongoing series, Marvel planned reviving six cancelled comic book series along with their classic numbering as special one-shots that will be available in November and December 2017. However, Dazzler #43 which was planned, was not released with the other one-shots and was to be released in June 2018 as Dazzler: X Song.

Title	Issue	Writer(s)	Artist(s)	Storyline	Ref.
Darkhawk	#51	Chad Bowers and Chris Sims	Kev Walker	The Return	
Dazzler: X Song	#1	Magdalene Visaggio	Laura Braga		
Master of Kung Fu	#126	CM Punk	Dalibor Talajić	Shang Chi's Day Off	
Not Brand Echh	#14	Nick Spencer and Christopher Hastings	Jay Fosgitt	Forbush Man Returns!	
Power Pack	#63	Devin K. Grayson	Marika Cresta	Where is Power Pack?	
Silver Sable and the Wild Pack	#36	Christa Faust	Paulo Siqueira	Silver and Bold	

== Limited series and one-shots ==
Title	Issue	Writer(s)	Artist(s)	Storyline	Ref.
Amazing Spider-Man Venom Inc Alpha	#1	Dan Slott and Mike Costa	Ryan Stegman	Venom Inc Part 1	
Amazing Spider-Man Venom Inc Omega	#1	Dan Slott and Mike Costa	Ryan Stegman	Venom Inc Part 6	
Damnation Johnny Blaze Ghost Rider	#1	Christopher Sebela	Phil Noto	Damnation Tie-In	
Doctor Strange Damnation	#1-4	Donny Cates and Nick Spencer	Rod Reis and Szymon Kudranski		
Hunt for Wolverine	#1	Charles Soule	David Marquez		
Hunt for Wolverine Adamantium Agenda	#1-4	Tom Taylor	R. B. Silva		
Hunt for Wolverine Claws of a Killer	#1-4	Mariko Tamaki	Butch Guice		
Hunt for Wolverine Mystery in Madripoor	#1-4	Jim Zub	Thony Silas		
Hunt for Wolverine Weapon Lost	#1-4	Charles Soule	Matteo Buffagni		
Hunt for Wolverine Dead Ends	#1	Charles Soule	Ramon Rosanas		
Legion	#1-5	Peter Milligan	Wilfredo Torres	Trauma 1-5	
Marvel Legacy	#1	Jason Aaron	Various		
Mighty Thor At The Gates Of Valhalla	#1	Jason Aaron	Jen Bartel and Ramon K. Perez		
New Mutants: Dead Souls	#1-6	Matthew Rosenberg	Adam Gorham		
Phoenix Resurrection The Return of Jean Grey	#1-5	Matthew Rosenberg	Leinil Francis Yu	The Return of Jean Grey 1-5	
Quicksilver No Surrender	#1-5	Saladin Ahmed	Eric Nguyen		
Rogue & Gambit	#1-5	Kelly Thompson	Pere Perez	Ring of Fire 1-5	
Spirits of Vengeance	#1-5	Victor Gischler	David Baldeon	War at the Gates of Hell 1-5	
Venomized	#1-5	Cullen Bunn	Iban Coello		

== Reception ==
According to Diamond Comic Distributors, Marvel Legacy #1 was the biggest selling comic book title of 2017.
