= Thanos Rising =

Comic book limited series

- Promotional cover art to Thanos Rising #1 by Simone Bianchi

Publication information
- Publisher: Marvel Comics
- Schedule: Monthly
- Genre: Superhero
- Publication date: April – August 2013
- No. of issues: 5
- Main character(s): Thanos; Death

Creative team
- Written by: Jason Aaron
- Artist: Simone Bianchi

Thanos Rising is a five-issue comic book limited series published by Marvel Comics that debuted on April 3, 2013, as part of Marvel NOW!. The series, written by Jason Aaron with artwork by Simone Bianchi, focuses on the origins of the supervillain Thanos.

== Publication history ==
A Thanos origin story was first announced by Marvel Comics in July 2012 under the title Thanos: Son of Titan with the creative team of writer Joe Keatinge and artist Richard Elson, but was canceled prior to its planned release in the summer of 2012 and the creative team moved over to Morbius: The Living Vampire. In January 2013 Marvel Comics released a one-word teaser image stating Birth, including the creative team of Jason Aaron and Simone Bianchi. A week later, Marvel officially announced Thanos Rising to the press with a target publication date of April 2013.

== Plot summary ==
Thanos returns to his destroyed home on the Saturn moon Titan to visit the grave of his mother, Sui-San. The story then goes back to the birth of Thanos, where Sui-San tries to kill Thanos at first sight. The doctors then sedate his mother at Eternal Mentor's request. During his school years, Thanos has the reputation of the smartest child in school as well as a pacifist, though he kept himself isolated due to his appearance and only played with his brother Eros, though soon enough, a group of children approach him and he becomes friends with them despite his appearance. He was also a talented artist and had recurring nightmares about someone trying to kill him at birth, which is revealed to his mother who appears to be imprisoned in a mental institution. Thanos is then tasked to dissect a lizard, which he runs away from and vomits outside, where he encounters a girl who tells him about a cave she visits. Thanos visits the caves with his new friends, where they are trapped by collapsing rocks.

After three days of digging out the rocks, Thanos sees that a group of lizards have eaten his friends right down to the bone and he flees. Upon returning to school, he is once again alone due to the circumstances surrounding him being the only survivor. Thanos' present day dialogue says the people of Titan had decided that Thanos had murdered them, starting him on the road to his present day self. The truth is, however, Thanos was convinced by the same girl who showed him the cave, to drop his overly passive nature so he could kill the lizards in revenge for his dead friends.

Thanos on the cover of Thanos Rising #3 (June 2013). Art by Simone Bianchi and Ive Svorcina.

Thanos then begins to move on to bigger and better subjects believing his killing spree to be nothing more than a scientific experiment in the name of knowledge. He moves from dissecting lizards to cave apes and eventually starts killing his fellow eternals starting with 2 teens from his school. He admits to the girl that he has feelings for her and tries to kiss her and says he can make her love him. She says the only love he knows is the love of killing. He then decides to find out the cause of his bloodlust rationalizing a genetic reason. He then turns to his mother strapped to a table and tells her that once he has found out what the reason for his insanity is and has cut it out of her that he won't have to be a monster anymore. He then proceeds to dissect her and apologizes that she didn't succeed in killing him when he was first born.

Years later, a full grown Thanos leaves Titan to join a group of space pirates as their navigator. During his space travels he finds many lovers and bears many children with them in the hopes of finding and semblance of normalcy and happiness. However, he finds none. Soon he is confronted by his captain who is fed up with his overly passive nature and severely wounds him. Thanos, apparently ready for death, blacks out and awakens having killed the captain and taken command of his crew. Thanos then leaves for Titan to visit his mother's grave. He is greeted by a familiar face, the girl from his childhood, now a grown woman. She asserts that Sui-san isn't the only girl that he came to Titan to see. Thanos once again pleads for her affection telling her that she will want for nothing. He tells him that there are many things that she wants. He assures that he is the only one who can give them to her. She asserts that if they are to be together she needs to know that he belongs only to her. On a distant planet Thanos returns to one of his many lovers along with their son. She is overjoyed to see him and puts their son in his arms. She tells him to let him see what kind of man his father really is. He then proceeds to slaughter the child to horror of his mother before killing her as well. He then turns to the woman and asks her if that is enough. She asks, is that all of them? He replies, "No". "Then it is not enough." She says, "You want to be loved don't you?" "That is all I have ever wanted," Thanos replied. "Then you have a lot more people to kill," the woman says.
