= Ego Sum =

Italian comic book trilogy

Ego Sum is a comic book trilogy written and illustrated by Italian artist Simone Bianchi. The first volume was published on 16 January 2004 in Italy, France, Canada and Luxembourg. The second volume was published in April 2005. In 2005, Bianchi was awarded the Yellow Kid Award for "Best Italian Comic Artist" and "Writer of the Year" at the Expocartoon convention in Rome, for his work on Ego Sum.
