= Simone Bianchi (artist) =

Italian comic book illustrator, painter and graphic designer

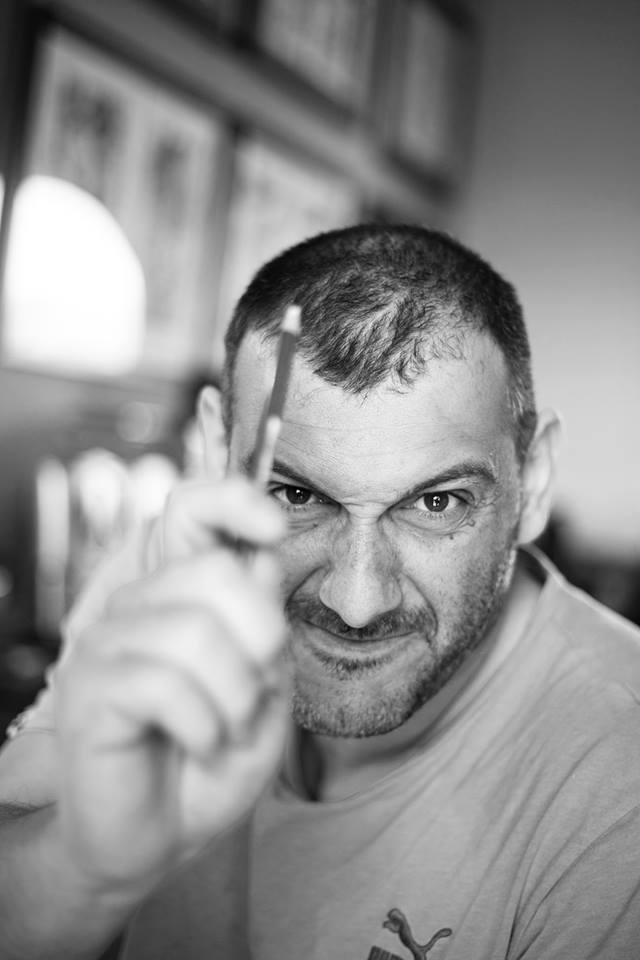
- Born: July 10, 1972 (age 54) Lucca, Italy
- Areas: Penciller, Inker
- Notable works: Ego Sum; Onirika; Seven Soldiers: Shining Knight; Wolverine; Batman; Detective Comics
- Awards: Yellow Kid Award for the Best Italian Comic Artist and Writer of the Year

Simone Bianchi (born July 10, 1972) is an Italian comic book illustrator, painter, graphic designer and art instructor, known to Italian audiences for his work in comics, CD covers, music videos, TV commercials and role-playing games. His most popular Italian comics is (unfinished) trilogy Ego Sum. To American comic book readers, he is best known for his work on comics such as Detective Comics, Green Lantern and Wolverine. Bianchi's style is distinguished by his use of ink wash, or watercolor halftones.

== Early life ==
Simone Bianchi was born July 10, 1972, in Lucca, Tuscany, Italy, where he still lives today. As a child, he had a love of superheroes, and took to tracing and copying illustrations of Spider-Man, Daredevil, the Fantastic Four, Batman and Superman before he learned how to read and write.

== Career ==
=== Italian work ===
When he was fifteen, he published humor comic strips in the daily newspaper Il Tirreno, and went on to produce cartoons and vignettes in several other regional and national publications. In 1994, Bianchi met comic book artist Claudio Castellini, who became his teacher and mentor. Subsequently, Bianchi illustrated the premiere issues of Nembo for Phoenix of Bologna, and Rivan Ryan for Comic Art of Rome, and 20 pages of Brendon for Sergio Bonelli Editore.

In 1998 his work was exhibited at a comic book convention in Lucca alongside well-known American comic book illustrators Will Eisner, Andy Kubert and Adam Kubert.

Bianchi was commissioned by Metal Blade Records to illustrate the CD cover for Timeless Crime, a CD by the Italian power metal band Labyrinth. That same year he was hired as an assistant to Ivo Milazzo in teaching a course on comic book art techniques at the Accademia di Belle Arti in Carrara (School of Fine Arts).

In 1999 Bianchi illustrated the cover of Fantastici Quattro (Fantastic Four) for Wiz magazine, and a one-shot Conan Il Barbaro (Conan the Barbarian), both published by Marvel Italia, the Italian branch of Marvel Comics.

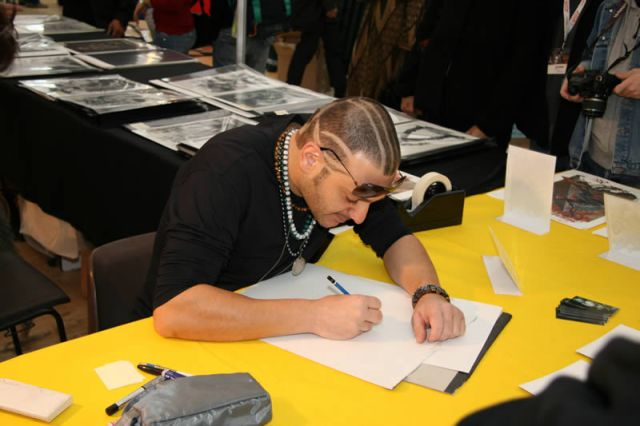
Bianchi drawing at a convention

Bianchi illustrated the cover of the debut album of the progressive power metal band Vision Divine, which was voted by metal and hard rock fans as the second-best album artwork worldwide. Bianchi's other album cover work included "Sigma" by Athreia Records, and Labyrinth's album, Sons of Thunder for Metal Blade Records.

That same year Bianchi became a full-time teacher of Anatomy for Comics at the Scuola Internazionale (International School) di Comics in Florence. In the 2000, the School, along with publisher Calvin Edizioni, published Echi, Bianchi's first art book, highlighting his varied works over the previous three years.

In 2001, began working for Direct to Brain, one of the leading 3D video production studios in Europe, doing character design, storyboarding, scene design, graphic design and artistic supervision of 3D modeling. Among his clients included hip hop/reggae group 99 Posse’s “Stop the Train” (for BGM Records), “Kitchen Tools” for Virgin Records, and “Per me per sempre” (“For Me Always”) for BGM. In November and December that year, Bianchi did work for Fantasy Flight Games’s role-playing game Dragonstar. He also painted a poster for the Scuola Internazionale di Comics in Florence, illustrated Vision Divine's album Send Me an Angel, and taught a second illustration course at the Accademia di Belle Arti in Carrara.

In 2002 Bianchi, working for Pegaso, illustrated the four elements of earth, air, fire and water, on which resin sculptures were based. That summer, he published his second art book, The Art of Simone Bianchi. He also painted five illustrations for Eldec, and worked again for Direct to Brain, this time for a Coke commercial. That December, he began work writing and illustrating the first volume of Ego Sum, for Vittorio Pavesio, the 44 pages of which took him most of 2003 to fully paint. The first volume of Ego Sum was published in hardcover on January 16, 2004, in Italy, France, Canada, and Luxembourg. The second volume followed that year.

In 2004 Bianchi attended the annual Festival International De La Bande Dessinée (International Comics Festival) comic book convention in Angoulême, France, where he met Sal Abbinanti, a comic book penciller and the personal agent of American comic book painter Alex Ross, which led to Abbinanti signing Bianchi as one of his clients. In the Fall of that year, Bianchi painted the cover of an issue of Atomika, a comic book created by Abbinanti and Andrew Dabb that debuted the following year.

In October 2005 Bianchi's third art book, Onirika, was published by Vittorio Pavesio Productions and presented to the public at a convention in Lucca, for which he painted the official poster, on which he collaborated with his sister Gloria.

=== American work ===
Artwork for the cover of Shining Knight #2 (2005), Bianchi's first American comic book work

In mid-2004, Bianchi lived in New York City, and met artist Mike Bair, whose work Bianchi admired. Bair introduced Bianchi to DC Comics editor Peter Tomasi. After a few proposals, Tomasi gave Bianchi Grant Morrison's script for Seven Soldiers: Shining Knight, which became Bianchi's first American work.; it was published in 2005.

The same year, Bianchi did his first American work for Marvel Comics, illustrating a number of covers for X-Men Unlimited.

Bianchi's illustrated the interiors of Green Lantern #6 (December 2005), and subsequently illustrated the covers for issue #8 (March 2006) to issue #13 (August 2006), which were written by Geoff Johns.

Bianchi first ongoing monthly work for an American Marvel book was Wolverine #50 (March 2007) to issue #55 (September 2007), which was written by Jeph Loeb. To highlight the look of Bianchi's ink wash work, each of these six issues was offered to readers in both a color and black-and-white version.

Bianchi's other Marvel work includes covers for Ultimate Origins, Astonishing X-Men and Thunderbolts.

Bianchi also illustrated the covers of Batman, from issue #651 (May 2006) to issue #654 (August 2006).

Bianchi signed a two-year exclusive contract with Marvel in February 2006, citing his childhood love of the superhero genre, and his greater familiarity with Marvel's characters. Though his contract precludes him from doing any European work, it allows him to continue the cover work he began previously for rival DC Comics’s Detective Comics, which ran from issues #817 (May 2006) to #839 (February 2008).

Bianchi also hopes to continue his work on Ego Sum, the third book of which he has yet to begin, though he has not spoken with Marvel as to whether they would publish it in the United States.

Bianchi and writer Warren Ellis together worked on Astonishing X-Men, having taken over the book after the departures of Joss Whedon and John Cassaday. Following this he provided the art for the limited series Thor: For Asgard written by Robert Rodi.

=== Influences and work ===
Bianchi credits Michael Bair with contributing to his success, and a photo of them when they met in the Summer of 2004 hangs in his studio.

Bianchi uses extensive photo reference and a light box to give his artwork a realistic look. He uses a wooden drawing board that he used to draw on flat, but angled it due to back pain that he began having in 2006.

== Awards ==
In 2005 Bianchi was awarded with the Yellow Kid Award for the Best Italian Comic Artist and Writer of the Year at the Expo Cartoon Convention in Rome, for his work on Ego Sum.

== Bibliography ==
=== Interior art ===
==== DC ====
- Green Lantern, vol. 4, #6 (2005)
- Seven Soldiers: Shining Knight, miniseries, #1-4 (2005)

==== Marvel ====
- Amazing Spider-Man, vol. 4, #1.1-1.6 (2016)
- Astonishing X-Men #25-30 (2008–09)
- Fear Itself: Uncanny X-Force, miniseries, #1-3 (2011)
- New Avengers, vol. 3, #13-15 (2014)
- Original Sin #5.1-5.5 (2014)
- Star Wars #7 (2015)
- Thanos Rising, miniseries (2013)
- Thor: For Asgard, miniseries, #1-6 (2010–11)
- Wolverine, vol. 3, #50-55 (2007)
- Wolverine, vol. 4, #310-313 (2012)

=== Covers ===
- Batman #651-654 (2006)
- Detective Comics #817-839 (2006–2008)
- Green Lantern, vol. 4, #8-13 (2006)
- Wolverine: Origins #3, #21-25, #40, #47-50 (2006-2010)
- Thunderbolts #115 (2007)
- New X-Men, vol. 2, #45 (2007)
- X-Men, vol. 2, #206 (2007)
- Onslaught Reborn #5 (2008)
- Uncanny X-Men #494, #513-514, #539 (2008-2011)
- Wolverine: The Amazing Immortal Man & Other Bloody Tales, one-shot (2008)
- Ultimate Origins, miniseries, #1-2 (2008)
- Astonishing X-Men: Ghost Boxes, miniseries, #1-2 (2008)
- Dark Reign: Fantastic Four #1 (2009)
- Dark Avengers/Uncanny X-Men: Utopia #1-2 (2009)
- Dark Avengers #7-8 (2009)
- Wolverine: The Anniversary, one-shot (2009)
- Thor Giant-Size Finale #1 (2009)
- Dark X-Men, miniseries, 1-3 (2009-2010)
- The Amazing Spider-Man vol. 1 #555, 622, vol. 3 #15, 16.1 (2008-2015)
- Deadpool & Cable #25 (2010)
- Dark Wolverine #88-89 (2010)
- Franken-Castle #19-20 (2010)
- Black Panther: The Man Without Fear #513-520 (2010-2011)
- Uncanny X-Force #5.1, #35 (2011-2012)
- Wolverine: The Best There Is #5 (2011)
- Age of X Universe, miniseries, #1-2 (2011)
- X-Men: Giant-Size, oneshot (2011)
- The Sensational Spider-Man #33.1-33.2 (2012)
- Uncanny Avengers vol. 1 #3, vol. 2 #2 (2013-2015)
- Cable and X-Force #4 (2013)
- Avengers World #10 (2014)
- Spider-Man 2099 vol. 2 #1 (2014)
- Storm vol. 3 #1 (2014)
- Avengers, vol. 5, #38 (2014)
- The Amazing Spider-Man Annual vol. 3 #1 (2014)
- Rocket Raccoon vol. 2 #7 (2015)
- Star Wars vol. 2 #1 (2015)
- Darth Vader #1 (2015)
- All-New Captain America: Fear Him, miniseries, #1-4 (2015)
- Wolverines #6, #8 (2015)
- Uncanny Inhumans #0 (2015)
- Secret Wars, miniseries, #1-6 (2015)
- The Infinity Gauntlet #3 (2015)
