= Guardian Devil =

Arc narrative published by Marvel Comics

- Cover of Daredevil: Guardian Devil (1999), trade paperback collected edition, art by Joe Quesada
- Publisher: Marvel Comics
- Publication date: November 1998 – June 1999
- Genre: Superhero
- Title(s): Daredevil (vol. 2) #1-8
- Main character(s): Daredevil; Karen Page; Foggy Nelson; Bullseye; Mysterio

Creative team
- Writer: Kevin Smith
- Artist(s): Joe Quesada; Jimmy Palmiotti

"Guardian Devil" is an eight-issue Daredevil story arc originally published by Marvel Comics in Daredevil (vol. 2) #1-8. It features the hero suddenly caring for an infant that may be either the Messiah or the Antichrist. The issues were written by filmmaker Kevin Smith and illustrated by Joe Quesada and Jimmy Palmiotti. The 1999 graphic novel combining the eight issues into one collection features an introduction by Ben Affleck, who portrayed Daredevil in the 2003 feature film adaptation (in which Kevin Smith had a supporting role). The story features strong Catholic themes, which came from Smith's experiences.

== Synopsis ==
Daredevil's love interest, Karen Page, breaks up with him because she is confused about her feelings for him. Angry and heartbroken, Daredevil falls back on his Catholic faith for support.

A 15-year-old girl who knows his secret identity leaves her baby with Daredevil, claiming that the baby was born without her ever having sex. As he tries to discover more about the child's origins, he is contacted by a man called Nicholas Macabes, who claims that the child is actually the Antichrist, leaving Daredevil a small crucifix.

Karen visits Daredevil and reveals that she has HIV from her time as a porn actress. His partner Foggy Nelson is accused of murdering a wealthy divorcee with whom he was having an affair, after she seemingly turned into a demon. Rosalynd Sharpe, who is both their boss and Foggy's mother, fires Foggy to avoid having his arrest affect the financial future of their law firm. Matt quits the firm in disgust. Daredevil asks for assistance from Black Widow, but then attacks her, apparently convinced that Macabes was telling the truth about the child. Daredevil throws the baby off of the roof, prompting Black Widow to leap off herself, saving the child.

Daredevil speaks with Karen. She has been contacted by Macabes, who claims that the child is responsible for her HIV. Daredevil asks Doctor Strange for help. Strange tells Daredevil that the cross Macabes gave him was tainted with an undetectable drug which made him hostile whenever someone suggested that the child was innocent, revealing the cause of his attack on the Black Widow. Strange is able to purge the drug from Daredevil's system.

Summoning Mephisto for information, Daredevil and Strange learn that the church where Murdock left the baby is under attack. Daredevil arrives back just in time to confront Bullseye, who has murdered several nuns. Daredevil is unable to stop Bullseye from killing Karen and stealing the baby.

After briefly contemplating suicide, Matt tracks Macabes to his headquarters, fighting his way to the final stronghold, where Macabes reveals that he is actually the villain Mysterio. It is revealed that he was disappointed when he deduced from newspaper articles that the current Spider-Man was just a clone and saw no dignity in overpowering a 'copy' (even though by then, the clone had been killed and the current Spider-Man was indeed the original). A year ago, Mysterio was diagnosed with an inoperable brain tumour. He resolved to die after enacting his greatest scheme, turning his attention to Daredevil.

Mysterio purchased information about Daredevil from the Kingpin, and began to set up his scheme. He used artificial insemination to impregnate the girl, drugged Foggy, faked the demonic transformation and death of the divorcee, posed as Karen's doctor to fake the HIV diagnosis, and hired Bullseye to lure Daredevil to him for a final confrontation. Mysterio believed that Daredevil would kill him when he learned of his plot. Daredevil dismissed Mysterio as unoriginal, pointing out that the Kingpin had already attempted to drive him insane once before, and that Mysterio had previously attacked J. Jonah Jameson with fake supernatural occurrences. Despondent, Mysterio frees the baby, and then—noting that his last move was stolen from Kraven—shoots himself.

After Karen's funeral, a conversation with Spider-Man leads Daredevil to realize that the infant he had saved represented a positive outcome among the tragedy. His faith renewed, he names the baby after Karen and gives it up for adoption to a couple in New Jersey. He visits Black Widow and asks for forgiveness. After Foggy is released from jail, he and Matt visit the site of their old office, and Matt suggests that he will use Karen's money—left to him in her will—to re-open their own practice.

Later, Matt visits a church for confession, admitting to the priest that he feels his faith has been restored. The confession is cut short, as Matt rushes out to rescue a child trapped in a burning building with a smile.

== Supplemental releases ==
- A prologue was released as a #0 cybercomic in September 2008.
- A special #1/2 issue was released through a promotion with Wizard #96.
- The story was released on DVD as a Digital Comic Book by Intec Interactive in 2003.

== In other media ==
A side-by-side view of the scene shot for the 2003 film based on the comic series panels.

- Karen Page's death in Guardian Devil was alluded to in "The Rogues' Challenge" game on the Spider-Man: The Animated Series DVD Spider-Man: The Return of the Green Goblin. One of the questions was which hero's girlfriend was Mysterio responsible for the death of. Two wrong answers were the Thing and Spider-Man, with Stan Lee hinting to eliminating the latter by saying that Mary Jane Watson was alive.
- Bullseye's fight with Daredevil in the church is adapted in the Daredevil episode "Karen".

== Collected editions ==
Format	Title	Material collected	Pages	Publication date	ISBN
Trade paperback	Marvel's Finest: Daredevil	Daredevil (vol. 2) #1-3	86	January 1999	978-0785107156
Trade paperback	Daredevil Visionaries: Kevin Smith	Daredevil (vol. 2) #1-8	192	September 1999	978-0785107378
Hardcover	Daredevil Visionaries: Kevin Smith	Daredevil (vol. 2) #1-8; comes with CD-ROM that includes #0 and #1/2 and other special features	192	August 2000	978-0936211558
Oversized hardcover	Daredevil Vol. 1	Daredevil (vol. 2) #1/2, 1-11, 13-15	392	April 2003	978-0785110156
Oversized hardcover	Daredevil Vol. 1 (reprint)	Daredevil (vol. 2) #1/2, 1-15	392	September 2006	978-0785124016
Premiere hardcover	Daredevil: Guardian Devil (10th Anniversary Edition)	Daredevil (vol. 2) #1-8	232	September 2008	978-0785134381
Trade paperback	Daredevil: Guardian Devil (10th Anniversary Edition)	Daredevil (vol. 2) #1-8	232	April 2010	978-0785141433
