= Daredevil/Bullseye: The Target =

Comic book

- Daredevil/Bullseye: The Target #1

Publication information
- Publisher: Marvel Comics
- Format: Limited series
- Genre: Superhero
- Publication date: November 2002 - (further issues pending)
- No. of issues: N/A
- Main character(s): Daredevil; Bullseye

Creative team
- Created by: Kevin Smith (writer); Glenn Fabry (illustrator)

Daredevil/Bullseye: The Target is an unfinished limited series comic book from Marvel Comics featuring the superhero Daredevil in pursuit of his nemesis, the assassin Bullseye. The series was written by Kevin Smith with illustrations by Glenn Fabry. It is known for being quite delayed, with the first issue coming out in November 2002, and the second issue never being released.

== Publication history ==
The first issue was released in November 2002 (and then again in February 2003 to coincide with the release of the Daredevil film) without a follow-up issue. Smith, who had become fully involved in the production of his film Jersey Girl, planned on finishing both this and another limited series, Spider-Man/Black Cat: The Evil That Men Do as soon as production on the film concluded.

However, Smith wound up not returning to either series until 2005. The final three issues of Spider-Man/Black Cat were released during November 2005 to January 2006.

In September 2005, Smith answered the controversy on the messageboard of his official website where he revealed panels from issue #2 and stated that the series would return in mid-2006. He also emphasized that the new issues would reflect the changes in Marvel continuity that had occurred in the four years between issues. Issue #2 never materialized, however, and the project appears to have been quietly dropped.

In the book Writers on Comics Scriptwriting, Smith stated that project was one he was not particularly proud of, stating that he wrote the first issue quickly so as to use Bullseye before then-current Daredevil writer Brian Michael Bendis would have a chance to use him in a story and as a result he believes he produced a product that was below satisfactory levels.

Smith later revealed that the "target" in question that Bullseye was hired to kill was Captain America.

== Synopsis ==
Three years since Bullseye killed Karen Page, (Note: as depicted in Daredevil: Guardian Devil) Matt Murdock prepares for his revenge. Meanwhile, Bullseye targets one of New York City's elite.

=== Part 1 ===
Daredevil sits above the Pile, reflecting New Yorkers' strength, his own life, and the murder of Karen Page. After laying flowers on her grave, he foils a bank robbery by the Owl, brutally beating him. Later that night, he destroys a punching bag bearing a photo of Bullseye.

Meanwhile, a wealthy man named Roger conducts a business deal with two men. Assuming them to be Arab, he blames them for 9/11. However, he agrees to connect them to Bullseye. Roger shows the men a young, single mother he has been stalking as Bullseye arrives. The two men hand Bullseye a photo of their target, which takes him aback, and he demands $20 million. Before the men can agree, they test Bullseye by tasking him with killing the young woman. Without hesitation, Bullseye uses a toothpick from a martini to kill her.
