= Milla Donovan =

- Art by Alex Maleev.

Publication information
- Publisher: Marvel Comics
- First appearance: Daredevil vol. 2 #41 (March 2003)
- Created by: Brian Michael Bendis; Alex Maleev

In-story information
- Full name: Milla Donovan
- Supporting character of: Daredevil

Milla Donovan is a fictional character appearing in American comic books published by Marvel Comics. She is usually depicted as a supporting character in the comic-book series Daredevil. She was created by Brian Michael Bendis and Alex Maleev and first appeared in Daredevil vol. 2 #41 (2003). Her appearance was modeled after that of Maleev's wife.

== Fictional character biography ==
Milla is introduced when she accidentally walks in front of an oncoming truck and is rescued by Daredevil. After getting her to help, Daredevil realizes she is blind. Milla later visits Matt Murdock (whose secret identity as Daredevil has been publicized) to thank him and asks him out on a date. While Matt is hesitant on saying anything that would implicate him, he agrees to go out with her.

Their date is interrupted when Matt is brought in for a murder investigation of the owner of the Globe, whom Matt was suing for posting his secret identity. In fact, it was the Kingpin that had committed the crime, and not Murdock.

Shaken up by this experience, Milla hesitates on continuing her relationship but persists due to the encouragement of one of her friends. She then experiences first-hand two of Daredevil's foes when Typhoid Mary first attacked Matt in broad daylight. Later, the assassin called Bullseye, killer of two of Matt's previous girlfriends, attempts to murder Milla as well, but is stopped by Daredevil.

The two are later married, but Milla seeks to annul the marriage when she discovers that Matt was possibly having a nervous breakdown earlier due to the stress over the death of Matt's previous girlfriend, Karen Page and her marriage was a product of that. She later returns to Matt, but he is arrested, as conclusive evidence that Matt is Daredevil has been discovered by the FBI. The two did not speak for some time, but Milla did appear at the funeral of Foggy Nelson. Later she visits him in prison, but he refuses to talk as he is trying to get her away from the prison and an imminent riot.

After Matt's escape from Ryker's (during which he teamed up with the Punisher, pretending to be his hostage until they got out), it wasn't until Matt's return from France that the pair was reunited. Soon after, the return of Lily Lucca (a woman Matt met in France, whose perfume smells like men's fondest memories. In Matt's case, Karen Page) causes an argument between Milla and Matt, who argue briefly over the situation until they're attacked at a restaurant by The Gladiator. The Gladiator later kidnaps Milla and tosses her off a building. Rescued by Daredevil, Milla proceeds to tell Daredevil not to kill the Gladiator, who seems to be in an unusual amount of pain and under someone else's control. Daredevil spares him, and leaves Milla alone while he pursues an as-yet-unnamed supervillain—presumingly the one who'd been influencing Melvin Potter.

After a few hours left alone, Milla goes to the law office to find Matt. After discovering he's out being Daredevil, Foggy volunteers to take Milla home, accompanied by Lily Lucca, toward whom Milla has extremely hostile tendencies. While in the subway station, Lily attempts to be helpful, only to be met with an exclamation of, "Just die, bitch!" before Milla tries to push her in front of an oncoming train. Lily bumps into an older man, who ends up falling in front of the train and dying instead (Daredevil's plot as this happens involves a drug whose effects have yet to be fully explained, and Milla is acting strangely). Milla seems appalled by what she's apparently just done. Meanwhile, Daredevil is being incapacitated by Mr. Fear, who claims to know Milla, and has given her the drug. Milla was then put under house arrest, awaiting a trial, then hospitalized in a mental institution, where she has been completely isolated from Matt.

Sometime after that, her parents wanted to get Milla back into their custody and removed her from the mental institution. Lady Bullseye under her disguise of a lawyer showed them compromising photos of Matt and Dakota North together, allowing them to be able to get full custody of their daughter. In the end Matt decides to agree to sign for divorce to give Milla's parents what they want and to distance himself from her, so he would no longer put Milla's life in danger.

Milla appears in the third Daredevil series. Going home, Matt finds Milla in his bed, apparently sane. Knowing that she was not supposed to get better from Mr. Fear's drugs, he puts some sleeping pills in her tea and asks Foggy to check what happened at the hospital. Foggy discovers that Milla is still in her cell. When Matt returns to his apartment, Milla is missing, along with all traces of her presence. It is soon discovered that all this has been organized by an unknown figure using the Spot teleportation system. Milla was later marked as one of Bullseye's targets, but Black Widow was able to protect her.
