= Dakota North (character) =

Fictional character in the Marvel Comics universe

- Dakota North by Marko Djurdjevic.

Publication information
- Publisher: Marvel Comics
- First appearance: Dakota North #1 (June 1986)
- Created by: Martha Thomases; Tony Salmons

In-story information
- Full name: Dakota North
- Species: Human
Dakota North
Publication information
- Publisher: Marvel Comics
- Schedule: Bimonthly
- Format: Ongoing series
- Publication date: June 1986 – February 1987
- No. of issues: 5
- Main character(s): Dakota North; Ricky North
Creative team
- Written by: Martha Thomases
- Artist: Tony Salmons
- Letterer: Jim Novak
- Colorist: Christie Scheele
- Editor: Larry Hama
Collected editions
- Dakota North: Design for Dying: ISBN 9781302912505

Dakota North is a fictional character appearing in American comic books published by Marvel Comics. Created by writer Martha Thomases and artist Tony Salmons, North was originally the star of her own short-lived 1986 series and later a part of the supporting casts of Cage, Daredevil, and Captain Marvel. The character exists in Marvel's main shared universe, known as the Marvel Universe.

== Creation ==
A freelance magazine writer, Thomases had never written for comics before, while Salmons had only completed a few fill-in assignments for Marvel. Through a mutual acquaintance with Dennis O'Neil, Thomases met Larry Hama, then an editor at Marvel, and brainstormed ideas to come up with the character of tough but feminine detective Dakota North. Salmons was assigned to draw the book by Hama, who felt that the artist was talented but inexperienced at storytelling. The editor then tried to nurture their raw talent as the book developed. Hama compared the character to Emma Peel from the British television series The Avengers, and initial promotion suggested the book would not take place in the Marvel Universe and drew comparisons with Miami Vice and Modesty Blaise. In a 2018 retrospective article for The Comics Journal, Keith Silva would speculate that the series was commissioned in an attempt to address a lack of lead female characters in Marvel's portfolio at the time - since the cancellation of Dazzler, the only other female-led ongoing series Marvel had at the time was Trina Robbins' Misty on their young readers Star Publications label - and the company's industry dominance at the time allowing them to take risks.

== Publication history ==
Dakota North debuted in the first issue of her own bimonthly series, Dakota North However, the series was cancelled after five issues; the cancellation is considered a minor mystery; Thomases recalled hearing the first issue sold 120,000 copies, and while she acknowledged there would have been some drop-off that the book might have been cancelled to cut costs as Jim Shooter was reluctant to cut back on the poor-selling New Universe titles. In a 2012 interview, Salmons noted that sales data for the title was still sparse when the decision was made, which Marvel told him was largely down to housekeeping ahead of their 25th anniversary plans. Thomases would not write in comics again.

In September 1986 Dakota North was announced as a guest star (alongside Silver Sable) in Peter Parker, the Spectacular Spider-Man #124, which would mark the character being moved to the Marvel Universe However, these plans were dropped and Dakota instead had to wait until Web of Spider-Man #37, which featured some of Dakota North's supporting cast and attempted to tie up some of the loose ends. The character then went into obscurity before briefly resurfacing, getting an entry in The Official Handbook of the Marvel Universe Update '89 #5, guesting in Power Pack #46 in 1989 and co-starring with The Wasp in the inventory-clearing 1990 Fall Special Marvel Super-Heroes (Vol. 2) #3. In 1992 the character was featured in the supporting cast of Cage, an updated Luke Cage title written by Marcus McLaurin, but again went on a long hiatus when the series ended in late 1993.

Eight years later, Dakota North resurfaced in a three issue arc of Christopher Priest's Black Panther, before another five-year absence before appearing in 2006 as part of the supporting cast of Ed Brubaker's Daredevil, and would make semi-regular appearances in the title over the next few years, as well as other Marvel titles such as New Avengers, Captain Marvel and Avengers Assemble as well as receiving entries in Marvel Legacy: The 1980s Handbook and The Official Handbook of the Marvel Universe A-Z . She was also listed in the Punisher section of the appendix in Marvel Encyclopedia: Marvel Knights (2004). Along with these appearances, a new Dakota North series written by C. B. Cebulski and pencilled by Lauren McCubbin was reportedly planned in 2006; a promotional image by McCubbin was released, but the series never materialized.

In 2018, Marvel issued the trade paperback Dakota North: Design for Dying, reprinting all five issues of Dakota North, her appearances in Web of Spider-Man, Power Pack and Marvel Superheroes and the "Cruel & Unusual" arc that introduced her to Daredevil.

== Fictional character biography ==
Dakota North is the daughter of ex-CIA agent Samuel James "S.J." North and his wife Caroline. Dakota North and her brother Ricky were raised by their father after their mother died in a car explosion. After a successful child modelling stint, during which she appeared on several magazine covers, Dakota decided to become a private detective. Her father felt this was dangerous but the headstrong Dakota chose her own path, causing ongoing discord between them. After serving a three-year apprenticeship with an agency, she opened her own business specializing in high-paying fashion industry cases, using her model connections to her advantage. She soon owned small branches in New York, Rome, Tokyo and Paris. Robert "Mad Dog" Morales ran the New York branch, and Yvon Berse ran the Paris branch. Business executive Cleo Vanderlip sought to crash the stock value of her employer, the high-tech corporation Rycom, so she could take it over. She arranged for them to purchase and heavily invest in Luke Jacobson Fashion, planning to ruin the company by killing the fashion mogul, blackmailing his assistant Anna Stasio into helping her. Wanting to destroy SJ by slaying Dakota, Cleo had thug Scott "Otto" Shanks vandalize Jacobson's workplace, then suggested that Luke hire Dakota for protection. but North saved Jacobson, killing Shanks in the process.

Dakota's 12-year-old brother Ricky came to stay with her - and promptly became involved when old friend Major George C. "Coop" Cooper left a nerve-gas-filled pen with the boy. Seeking the gas, Vanderlip assigned desperate young model Daisy Kane to befriend Ricky. Unknown to Dakota, the pair travelled to Europe while she protected Coop from Russian thugs hunting down the nerve gas. Dakota trailed Ricky to Paris but lost him when he took a train for Venice, but disembarked in Switzerland. Aided by police detective Amos Culhane, Dakota reunited with Ricky outside Grindelwald only for the trio was captured by Vanderlip's ally Sheik Ibn Bheik. They eventually escaped and the nerve gas was released in the sheik's castle, killing all present.

Dakota was later hired to investigate the "Slasher," a serial killer who targeted fashion models, slashing their faces and cutting their throats. The case was complicated by Harvey Finklestein, who sought to win over model Elyse Nolan by protecting her from a hired fake "Slasher." Despite the diversion, Dakota exposed a deranged Elyse as the real Slasher and captured her with Spider-Man's assistance before Elyse could attack Mary Jane Watson. Jack Power showed up on Dakota's office doorstep wanting to clear the name of his favorite author she took the case for fun, and quickly solved the case with the aid of the Punisher in the process, but was unable to prove anything - though she did not realise Jack and his sister Katie were members of the child super-hero group Power Pack. On a shopping trip, Dakota witnessed the Wasp battling the shape-changing Kingsize; she shot him, freeing the Wasp, who then defeated Kingsize.

The Chicago Spectator newspaper hired Dakota's company to provide a full background on super-mercenary Luke Cage. During her investigation, Dakota learned that Cage's father James Lucas was still alive. She met Cage and was later hired to run the paper's security. The assassin Hardcore sent the Untouchables and Tombstone after Dakota. After promising Cage the information if he aided her, Dakota was kidnapped and delivered her to Hardcore; Cage and the Punisher would rescue Dakota. When Cage later went missing, Dakota tracked his father to Arizona, and teamed up with Iron Fist to save Cage himself from kidnappers. She was attacked by Cage when he was possessed by Bogeyman, but ultimately helped him resist the Bogeyman's control. Dakota was the only one aware that Cage survived, and helped him stay undercover as long as the authorities were after him. Later, Black Panther's cousin M'Koni hired Dakota to investigate her husband, who proved to be in the thrall of the Wakandan Malice. Black Panther hired Dakota to watch Malice's next target, Monica Lynne. Malice sent assassins but Dakota returned her to the Wakandan Consulate, though North was nearly garroted before Black Panther saved her.

When blind attorney Matt Murdock was imprisoned, his law partners Franklin "Foggy" Nelson and Becky Blake hired Dakota at the recommendation of Jessica Jones to provide security and do investigative work for the firm. While visiting Murdock with Foggy, the pair were ambushed; restrained during the attack, Dakota watched in horror as Foggy was stabbed repeatedly and seeming died en route to the hospital. She began working with reporter Ben Urich and used her contacts to learn a new Daredevil was on the streets - Danny Rand. Murdock soon escaped from jail, and with Dakota's help exposed Vanessa Fisk as the mastermind behind the scheme. Foggy's "death" was revealed to have been faked to place him in Witness Protection. Murdock confided in Dakota that he truly was Daredevil, and she began aiding him regularly through several crises, including tracing the sudden insanity of Murdock's wife Milla Donovan to Mr. Fear. Murdock grew more irritable and desperate when Milla was put into a mental institution after being released from jail, but Dakota continued working for Matt, putting him in his place when necessary. Dakota drove Murdock to visit his wife over the following weeks, and took him out for a drink when he learned he was not allowed to see Milla while she received treatment.

After Cage sought Murdock's help in clearing Big Ben Donovan of a false murder charge, Dakota began investigating the case, convincing Murdock to join her and fight his depression. When Dakota got close to the truth, she was assaulted by a man she later identified as FBI agent Moss. After she attacked Moss with a baseball bat, she was shocked to see her estranged father at her apartment, warning her off the case. Dakota learned Donovan had a son but Moss shot her before she could report it. Dakota was rushed into surgery while Matt cleared up the case. After Iron Fist accelerated her healing, North trained with Murdock back at his townhouse - leading to a brief romantic tryst that Murdock swiftly regretted as he considered it a betrayal of his wife. Dakota tried staying professional but an investigator had photographed the affair; ashamed of the damage she had caused, Dakota subsequently avoided Murdock. Dakota was later stripped of her private investigator's license as part of the Kingpin's plot to frame H.A.M.M.E.R. director Norman Osborn. Using a compromising photograph, Dakota and Foggy forced the judge who had both of their licenses revoked to learn the Kingpin was behind their recent problems, leading North to decide that they need to locate Murdock at once.

Some time later, Carol Danvers developed a brain lesion; to help her remain healthy and mobile, Wendy Kawasaki modified one of Captain America's old Sky-Cycles and Carol hired Dakota to teach her how to fly it. Dakota also helped Captain Marvel track down the new Deathbird and supported Carol in her pursuit to identify and beat her enemy Yon-Rogg.

== Powers and abilities ==
Dakota North is skilled in several forms of hand-to-hand combat and marksmanship. She speaks conversational French, Japanese and Italian, and is familiar with other, unspecified, languages. She is also proficient in driving high-end cars and motorcycles.

== Collected editions ==
Title	ISBN	Release date	Issues
Dakota North: Design for Dying	9781302912505	June 26, 2018	Dakota North #1–5, Web of Spider-Man #37, Power Pack #46, Daredevil (Vol. 2) #107–110, material from Marvel Super-Heroes (Vol. 2) #3

== Reception ==
R.A. Jones was unimpressed with Dakota North when reviewing the first issue for Amazing Heroes, calling the writing "hackneyed" and "plodding" and expressing his frustration about a female-led book being underwhelming, though he positively noted Salmons' improving art. He also sardonically highlighted that a panel showing off North's "shapely ass" was unlikely to help the series find its hoped-for female audience.

Covering the 2018 collection Dakota North - Design for Dying, Keith Silva of The Comics Journal enthusiastically defended the series despite its flaws, stating "dogged and defiantly independent, Dakota North is a fashion-forward comic whose style never caught on."
