= List of Daredevil titles =

Printed depictions of the Marvel superhero

The following is a list of titles featuring the Marvel Comics character Daredevil.

== Primary series ==
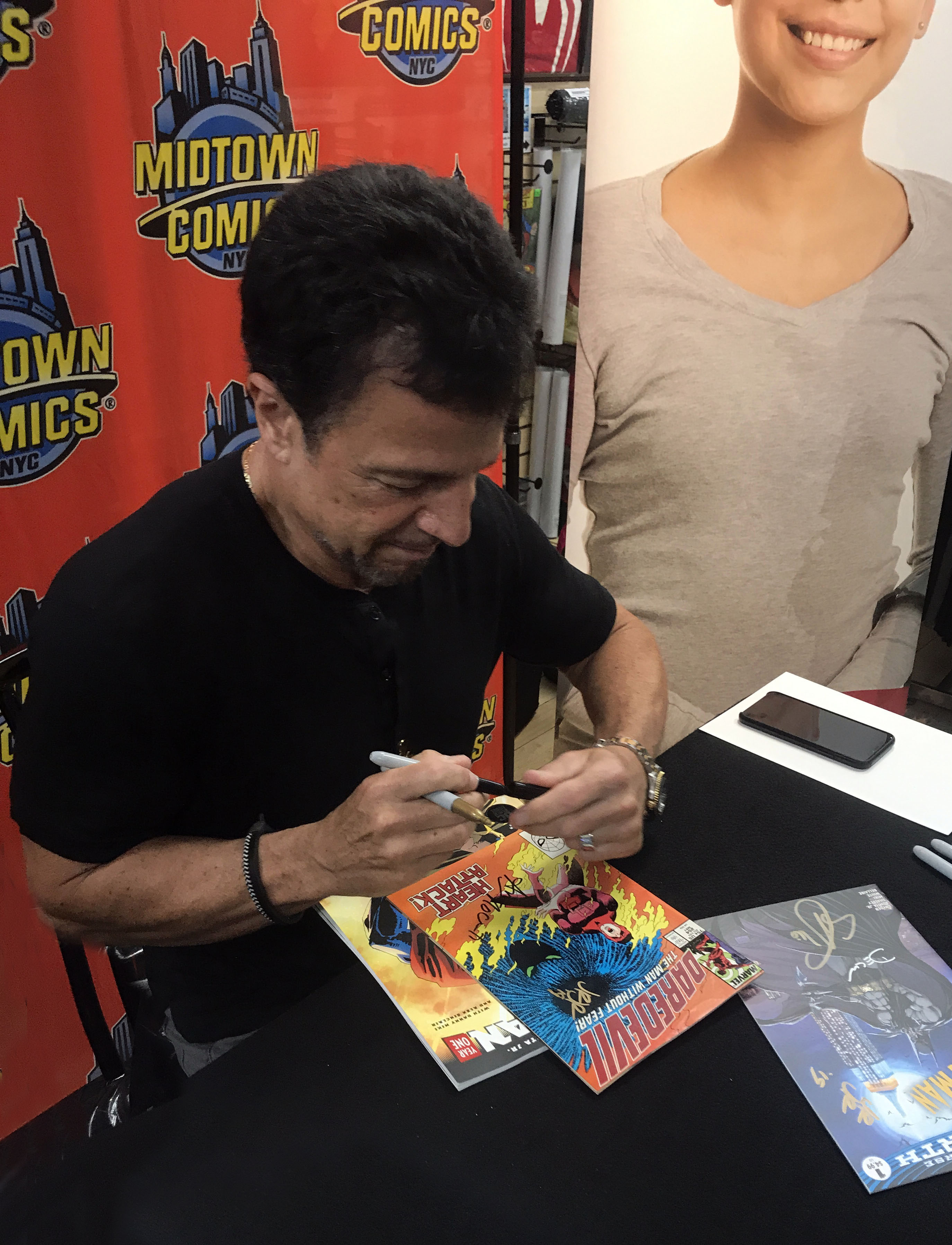
Artist John Romita Jr., who illustrated Daredevil stories under writers such as Ann Nocenti and Frank Miller, signing a copy of issue 254 of the series (Vol 1) at Midtown Comics in Manhattan

- Daredevil #1–380 (April 1964 – Oct. 1998)
  - Daredevil Special #1 (Sept. 1967)
  - Daredevil Special #2 (Feb. 1971; reprints)
  - Daredevil Special #3 (Jan. 1972; reprints)
  - Daredevil Annual #4 (1976)
  - Daredevil Annual #4 (1989) Note: Mislabelled as #4, rather than #5, both on cover and in indicia.
  - Daredevil Annual #6–10 (1990–1994)
  - Daredevil/Deadpool '97 Annual (1997)
- Daredevil Vol. 2, #1–119 [#381–499] (Nov. 1998 – Aug. 2009) Note: With issue #22, began official dual–numbering with original series, as #22 / 402, etc.
  - Daredevil Annual #1 (2007)
- Daredevil #500–512 (Oct. 2009 – Dec. 2010) Original numbering resumes.
- Daredevil Vol. 3, #1–36, #10.1 [#513–548] (July 2011 – February 2014)
  - Daredevil Annual #1 (2012)
- Daredevil Vol. 4 #1–18, #1.50, #15.1 [#549–566] (March 2014 – September 2015)
- Daredevil Vol. 5 #1–28 [#567–594] (February 2016–December 2017)
  - Daredevil Annual #1 (2016)
- Daredevil #595–612 (2017–2018) Original numbering resumes.
  - Daredevil Annual #1 (2018)
- Daredevil Vol. 6 #1–36 [#613–648] (2019–2021)
  - Daredevil Annual #1 (2020)
- Daredevil Vol. 7 #1–14 [#649–662] (2022–2023)
- Daredevil Vol. 8 #1–25 [#663–687] (2023–2025)
- Daredevil Vol. 9 #1 [#668-] (2026-)

== One-shots and Limited Series ==
- Giant-Size Daredevil #1 (1975)
- Daredevil/Black Widow: Abattoir (July 1993, graphic novel)
- Daredevil: The Man Without Fear #1–5 (Oct. 1993 – Feb. 1994) by Frank Miller and John Romita, Jr.
- Daredevil: Flashback #–1 (July 1997)
- Daredevil #1/2 (17 page comic published within Wizard #96, Aug. 1999)
- Daredevil: Ninja #1–3 (Dec. 2000 – May 2001) by Brian Michael Bendis and Rob Haynes
- Daredevil: Yellow #1–6 (Aug. 2001 – Jan. 2002) by Jeph Loeb and Tim Sale
- Ultimate Daredevil and Elektra #1–4 (October 2002 – February 2003) by Greg Rucka and Salvador Larocca
- Daredevil: The Target (per indicia), also known as Daredevil/Bullseye: The Target (per cover), #1 (Jan. 2003) by Kevin Smith and Glenn Fabry
- Daredevil: The Movie #1 (March 2003)
- Daredevil: Father #1–6 (June 2004, Oct. 2005 – Jan. 2006) by Joe Quesada
- Daredevil: 2099 #1 (Nov. 2004) by Robert Kirkman
- Daredevil: Redemption #1–6 (April–Aug. 2005; no cover dates; #1–2 both indicia–dated April 2005) by David Hine and Michael Gaydos
- Captain Universe/Daredevil #1 (Jan. 2006)
- Daredevil: Battlin' Jack Murdock #1–4 (2007)
- Dark Reign: The List – Daredevil (September 2009)
- Daredevil: Cage Match #1 (July 2010)
- Shadowland #1–5 (September 2010–January 2011)
- Daredevil: Black & White #1 (October 2010)
- Daredevil: Reborn #1–4 (2011)
- Daredevil: Dark Nights #1–8 (2012–2013)
- Daredevil: Road Warrior Infinite Comic #1–4 (2014); later reprinted as Issue #0.1 in the Daredevil Vol. 4 series
- Daredevil/Punisher #1–4 (2016); originally distributed as Daredevil/Punisher: Seventh Circle Infinite Comic #1–8
- Man Without Fear #1–5 (Jan. 2019) by Jed MacKay
- Devil's Reign #1–6 (2022)
  - Devil's Reign Omega #1 (2022)
- Daredevil: Woman Without Fear #1–3 (2022)
- Daredevil: Gang War #1–4 (2024)
- Daredevil: Black Armor #1–4 (2024)
- Daredevil: Woman Without Fear #1–4 (2024)
- Daredevil: Unleash Hell - Red Band #1–5 (2025)

== Team-ups ==
- Spider–Man and Daredevil Special Edition #1 (March 1984; reprints)
- Daredevil and the Punisher: Child's Play #1 (1988; reprints)
- Daredevil/Spider–Man #1–4 (Jan.−Apr. 2001)
- Ultimate Marvel Team-Up #6–8 (Jul.-Nov. 2001)
- Spider–Man/Daredevil #1 (Oct. 2002)
- Daredevil vs. Punisher: Means and Ends #1–6 (Sept. 2005–Jan. 2006; no cover dates; #1–2 both indicia–dated Sept. 2005) by David Lapham
- Daredevil & Captain America: Dead on Arrival #1 (November 2008)

== Company Crossovers ==
- Daredevil/Batman: Eye for an Eye (per indicia), also known as Daredevil and Batman (per cover), #1 (Jan. 1997)
- Shi/Daredevil #1 (Jan. 1997)
- Daredevil/Shi #1 (Feb. 1997)
- Batman/Daredevil: King of New York #1 (Dec. 2000)
- Magdalena/Daredevil (May 2008)

== Others ==
- Marvel Adventure #1–6 (Dec. 1975–Oct. 1976) Marvel Daredevil reprint series. Reprints Daredevil Vol. 1 #22–27.
- The Daredevils #1–11 (1982–Nov. 1983) Marvel UK series, mostly reprints.
- Daredevil vs. Vapora #1 (1993) Free health–and–safety comic sponsored by Gas Appliance Manufacturers Association & Consumer Product Safety Commission.
- Marvels Comics: Daredevil #1 (July 2000)
- Astonishing Tales #4 (July 2009)

== Collected editions ==
Daredevil's comic series has been collected into many trade paperbacks, hardcovers and omnibuses.
