= Daredevil (Marvel Comics character) =

Marvel Comics superhero

Matt Murdock Daredevil
- Promotional art for Daredevil vol. 2, #65 (September 2004). Art by Greg Land.

Publication information
- Publisher: Marvel Comics
- First appearance: Daredevil #1 (April 1964)
- Created by: Stan Lee (writer); Bill Everett (artist)

In-story information
- Alter ego: Matthew Michael "Matt" Murdock
- Species: Human
- Place of origin: Hell's Kitchen, New York City
- Team affiliations: Avengers; New Avengers; Defenders; Marvel Knights; The Chaste; The Hand
- Partnerships: Elektra; Black Widow; Foggy Nelson; Karen Page
- Notable aliases: Man Without Fear; Jack Batlin; Mike Murdock
- Abilities: Superhuman senses, agility, and reflexes; Echolocative radar sense; Master martial artist, hand-to-hand combatant, and stick fighter; Expert acrobat and gymnast; Expertise in criminology, criminal law, and police procedures; Utilizes billy club with multi-purpose functions

Daredevil is a superhero appearing in American comic books published by Marvel Comics. Created by writer-editor Stan Lee and artist Bill Everett, with some input from Jack Kirby, the character first appeared in Daredevil #1 (April 1964).

Daredevil is the alias of Matthew Michael "Matt" Murdock, a lawyer from Hell's Kitchen who was blinded in childhood by a chemical accident that enhanced his other senses. Matt hones his physical abilities and superhuman senses under his mentor, the blind and mysterious Stick, becoming an expert in martial arts. Eventually, in ironic contrast to his Catholic upbringing and beliefs, Matt dons a devil-like costume and takes up a dual life of fighting against the criminal underworld in New York City. This puts him in conflict with many super-villains, including his archenemies Bullseye and the Kingpin. He also becomes a skilled and respected lawyer who forms a law firm with Franklin "Foggy" Nelson, his best friend and college roommate. He establishes a long relationship with co-worker Karen Page, who experiences many hardships before her eventual murder by Bullseye. Daredevil also has a relationship with Elektra Natchios, a fearsome ninja assassin who is murdered by Bullseye before being resurrected.

Daredevil is a prominent example of a disabled superhero, and has served as positive representation for blind people. Writer/artist Frank Miller's influential tenure as lead author of the title in the early 1980s cemented the character as a popular and influential part of the Marvel Universe. Miller introduced elements of film noir and ninja films, and subsequent writers for the title have continued these themes and imagery. In particular, the Daredevil comics often explore political corruption, moral ambiguity, childhood trauma, disability, Irish Catholic identity, and Christian themes. The representation of women in the comic is controversial, but at times it has expressed feminist themes, particularly in the issues written by Ann Nocenti from 1986 to 1991. Daredevil is a critically acclaimed series, has won multiple Eisner Awards, in particular for later authors Brian Michael Bendis, Ed Brubaker, and Mark Waid. Major Daredevil stories include "Born Again" (1986), "Guardian Devil" (1998–1999), and "Daredevil: Yellow" (2001–2002). He is also a leading character in the company-wide stories Shadowland (2010) and Devil's Reign (2021–2022).

The character first appeared on screen in the television film The Trial of the Incredible Hulk (1989), portrayed by Rex Smith. Ben Affleck portrayed Daredevil in the 2003 feature film of the same name. Charlie Cox has portrayed the character in the Marvel Cinematic Universe, most prominently in the television series Daredevil (2015–2018) and Daredevil: Born Again (2025–present).

== Publication history ==
=== Creation ===
Following the success of the Fantastic Four in 1961, demand for superheroes increased in the comic book market, and Marvel Comics made an effort to create new characters to meet that demand. Stan Lee sought the creative input of Bill Everett, who had previously created Namor, and Jack Kirby, the co-creator of the Fantastic Four, the Avengers, and other well-known superheroes. Kirby and Everett co-designed Daredevil's original costume. Dartmouth professor Paul Young indicated that the basic concept of the character as a heroic blind vigilante is probably inspired by the symbol and motif of blind justice. Timothy D. Peters, a legal scholar, has also drawn attention to the recurring visual analogy with Lady Justice, the classical figure for the legal system. Bill Everett's daughter, Wendy Everett, was legally blind and found that her senses of hearing were more finely attuned as a result; this family experience became an inspiration for Daredevil's hyper-senses.

Prior blind characters in crime fiction and film included the British detective Max Carrados (created by Ernest Bramah) and the New York City detective Duncan Maclain (by Baynard Kendrick), who used their strong senses of hearing, touch, taste and smell to compensate for their lack of vision.

=== 1960s ===
Splash page of the first issue of Daredevil (April 1964) features the hero in his original costume. Art by Jack Kirby (penciler) and Bill Everett (inker).

The character debuted in Marvel Comics' Daredevil #1 (cover date April 1964), created by writer-editor Lee and artist Everett. The original costume design was a combination of black, yellow, and red, reminiscent of acrobat tights. The first issue covered the character's origins as well as the murder of his father, boxer "Battling Jack" Murdock, who raised young Matthew Michael Murdock in the Hell's Kitchen neighborhood of Manhattan, New York City. Jack instills in Matt the importance of education and nonviolence with the aim of seeing his son become a better man than himself. In the course of saving a blind man from the path of an oncoming truck, Matt is blinded by a radioactive substance that falls from the vehicle. The radioactive exposure heightens his remaining senses beyond normal human limits, and gives him a kind of "radar" sense, enabling him to detect the shape and location of objects around him. To support his son, Jack Murdock returns to boxing under the Fixer, a known gangster, and the only man willing to contract the aging boxer. When he refuses to throw a fight because his son is in the audience, he is killed by one of the Fixer's men. Having promised his father not to use violence to deal with his problems, Matt adopts a new identity who can use physical force. Adorned in a yellow and black costume made from his father's boxing robes and using his superhuman abilities, Matt confronts the killers as the superhero Daredevil, unintentionally causing the Fixer to have a fatal heart attack. Daredevil soon embarked on a series of adventures involving such villains as the Owl and the Purple Man.

As originally conceived, Daredevil relied only on his heightened senses; however, in issue #5, the first drawn by Wally Wood, his radar sense was introduced. Wood then introduced Daredevil's standard red costume in the story "In Mortal Combat with... Sub-Mariner!", featured in issue #7. John Romita Sr. briefly became the new artist in May 1966, just prior to his long tenure on The Amazing Spider-Man, soon replaced by Gene Colan, who stayed as artist until the early 1970s. In issue #16 (May 1966), Daredevil meets Spider-Man, who will eventually become one of Daredevil's closest friends. When Daredevil's secret identity becomes endangered, Matt adopts a third identity as his twin brother Mike Murdock, whose carefree, wisecracking personality more closely resembles the Daredevil guise than the stern, studious, and emotionally-withdrawn Matt Murdock. This third identity was dropped in issues #41–42; Daredevil fakes Mike Murdock's death and claims he had trained a replacement Daredevil. The series' 31-issue run by writer-editor Stan Lee and penciller Gene Colan (beginning with issue #20) includes Daredevil #47, in which Murdock defends a blind Vietnam veteran against a frame-up; Lee has cited it as one of his favorite stories. Colan argues that he was the first to introduce film noir influences to the series.

Matt's secret identity is accidentally disclosed to his girlfriend Karen Page in a story published in 1969. However, the revelation proves too much for her, and she breaks off the relationship and moves to Hollywood to become an actress.

=== 1970s ===
Gerry Conway took over as writer with issue #72. He moved Daredevil to San Francisco beginning with Daredevil #86, and simultaneously brought on the Black Widow as a co-star for the series. The Black Widow served as Daredevil's crime-fighting ally as well as his lover from November 1971 to August 1975. Conway introduced Black Widow as a romantic partner for Daredevil as "a way to re-energize the title". She joined the series in Daredevil #81 (1971) after her own solo feature in the title Amazing Adventures was cancelled two months earlier. Conway responded to feminist criticism by making Black Widow a more active and independent character, beginning in Daredevil #91 (1972). The series was retitled Daredevil and the Black Widow in the following issue. Steve Gerber became the writer for Daredevil with issue #97 (1973). Sales had declined, and in response he re-emphasized Daredevil as the central character. Black Widow's name was dropped from the title after issue #107 (1973). Chris Claremont briefly wrote for the title in the mid-1970s. Jenny Blake Isabella (credited as Tony Isabella) became the writer for Daredevil with issue #118, and she believed that Daredevil and Black Widow should be split up. Black Widow departed from the series in issue #124, feeling overshadowed by Daredevil.

The writing and editing jobs went to Marv Wolfman with issue #124 in 1975; he returned Daredevil to Hell's Kitchen. Wolfman promptly introduced the lively and emotionally fragile Heather Glenn to replace the Black Widow as Daredevil's love interest. Wolfman's 20-issue run also included the introduction of one of Daredevil's most popular villains, Bullseye. Jim Shooter wrote the series for issues #144 to No. 151.

Roger McKenzie began writing the series in 1978. McKenzie's work on Daredevil reflected his background in horror comics, and the stories and even the character himself took on a much darker tone. Daredevil battles a personification of death, and a re-envisioning of his Daredevil's origin shows him using stalker tactics to drive the Fixer to his fatal heart attack. McKenzie created chain-smoking Daily Bugle reporter Ben Urich, who eventually deduces Daredevil's secret identity. Halfway through his run, McKenzie was joined by penciller Frank Miller with issue #158 (May 1979).

In a story arc of this period, Daredevil reveals his identity to Heather Glenn. Their relationship survives, but proves increasingly harmful to both of them. Though the Black Widow returns for a dozen issues (#155–166) and attempts to rekindle her romance with Daredevil, he ultimately rejects her in favor of Glenn.

=== 1980s ===
Frank Miller was hired by editor Dennis O'Neil to take over the art on the series, recommended by Shooter because of Miller's earlier work on issues of The Spectacular Spider-Man guest-starring Daredevil. Miller says that the title was close to cancellation at the time he was hired. Miller initially collaborated with McKenzie, but eventually became the sole writer and the main artist. His initial run, first as penciler, then writer/penciler, and last a writer and layout artist began in May 1979 and ended in February 1983. The series made Miller a star in the industry. At the time that Miller wrote and drew the series, it was unusual in mainstream comics for one person to both illustrate and author a comic book. Miller modeled Matt Murdock's appearance on the actor Robert Redford. He took writing inspiration from hardboiled crime fiction and film noir, as well as the superhero comic tradition. For example, he drew on techniques of suspense, dramatic irony, and ambiguous characterization adopted from Raymond Chandler. Miller moved away from the conventions of the commercially dominant genre of comic books, superhero comics, toward the style that interested him most: crime comics. He cited Will Eisner and Moebius, from the comics tradition, and filmmakers Orson Welles, Fritz Lang, and Alfred Hitchcock as inspirations. Miller is also responsible for emphasizing Daredevil's Catholic beliefs and deep concern with penance.

Cover of Daredevil #184 (July 1982). Art by Frank Miller and Klaus Janson.

Resuming the drastic metamorphosis McKenzie began, Miller transformed the character and tone of the title. Most prominently, dedicated and loving father Jack Murdock is reimagined as a drunkard who physically abused his son Matt, entirely revising Daredevil's reasons for becoming a lawyer. Spider-Man villain Kingpin becomes the primary nemesis during Miller's run. Tormented by guilt, Daredevil gradually becomes something of an antihero. In issue #181 (April 1982), he attempts to murder Bullseye by throwing him off a tall building; when the villain survives as a quadriplegic, he breaks into his hospital room and tries to scare him to death by playing a two-man variation on Russian roulette with a secretly unloaded gun.

Miller drew detailed fighting scenes attentive to the physics and techniques of East Asian martial arts. He introduced ninjas into the Daredevil canon, introducing previously unseen characters who had played a major part in his youth: Stick, leader of the ninja clan, the Chaste, who had been Murdock's sensei after he was blinded; and Elektra, his college girlfriend who became a sometime member of a criminal organization called the Hand. Elektra was eventually killed by Bullseye, in a best-selling landmark issue that startled the comics audience.

Miller's period of authorship was enormously commercially successful. He left the series to pursue the creative freedom offered him by Marvel's competitor, DC Comics, who hired him to write a creator-owned "prestige" series, Ronin. In his absence, O'Neil wrote the series beginning with issue #194. David Mazzucchelli began illustrating the series during this period, initially in issue #220.

Miller returned to collaborate with Mazzucchelli on the acclaimed "Born Again" storyline in #226–233. In it, Karen Page returns as a heroin-addicted porn actress, and sells Daredevil's secret identity for drug money. The Kingpin acquires the information and, in an act of revenge, orchestrates a frame-up that costs Murdock his attorney's license. Murdock also discovers that his lost mother, Maggie, who he thought dead, is living as a nun. Miller ends the arc on a positive note, with Murdock reuniting with Karen Page.

Ann Nocenti became a long-running writer on the series, penning over 50 issues from 1986 to 1991. In this period, Murdock returns to law by co-founding with Page a nonprofit drug and legal clinic. Nocenti introduced the antagonist Typhoid Mary, who became a recurring villain. Typhoid Mary has dissociative identity disorder; while her "Typhoid" identity is evil, her alter ego, Mary Walker, is sweet and reserved, and enters into a relationship with Daredevil. In Nocenti's storyline, Murdock becomes a drifter in upstate New York; this was the first time the character had been taken outside of an urban environment. She concluded her run with a positive turn in Murdock's fortunes: He returns to Hell's Kitchen, regains his sense of self, reconciles with Foggy Nelson, and resolves to seek out Karen Page. Comics scholar Robert Hagan points out that Nocenti integrates themes from second-wave feminism into Daredevil in ways that are unusual and innovative for superhero comics of the period. For example, she criticizes the idealization of feminine domesticity as well as attempts by women to achieve liberation by simply imitating men, in stories featuring Karen Page, Typhoid Mary, and Brandy Ash, a minor supporting character who presents feminist views. Nocenti addressed a number of other left wing causes during her tenure, such as the peace movement.

=== 1990s ===
New writer D. G. Chichester continued from where Nocenti left off. He initially collaborated with Lee Weeks. In the early part of his run, Daredevil succeeds in toppling Kingpin from leadership of his criminal empire. This is a mirror of Miller's "Born Again", in which now it is Kingpin rather than Daredevil who is stripped of his power. Beginning with issue #305 (June 1992), Scott McDaniel became the new series penciller. In this period there were often guest appearances from other Marvel characters who were popular at the time, such as Ghost Rider.

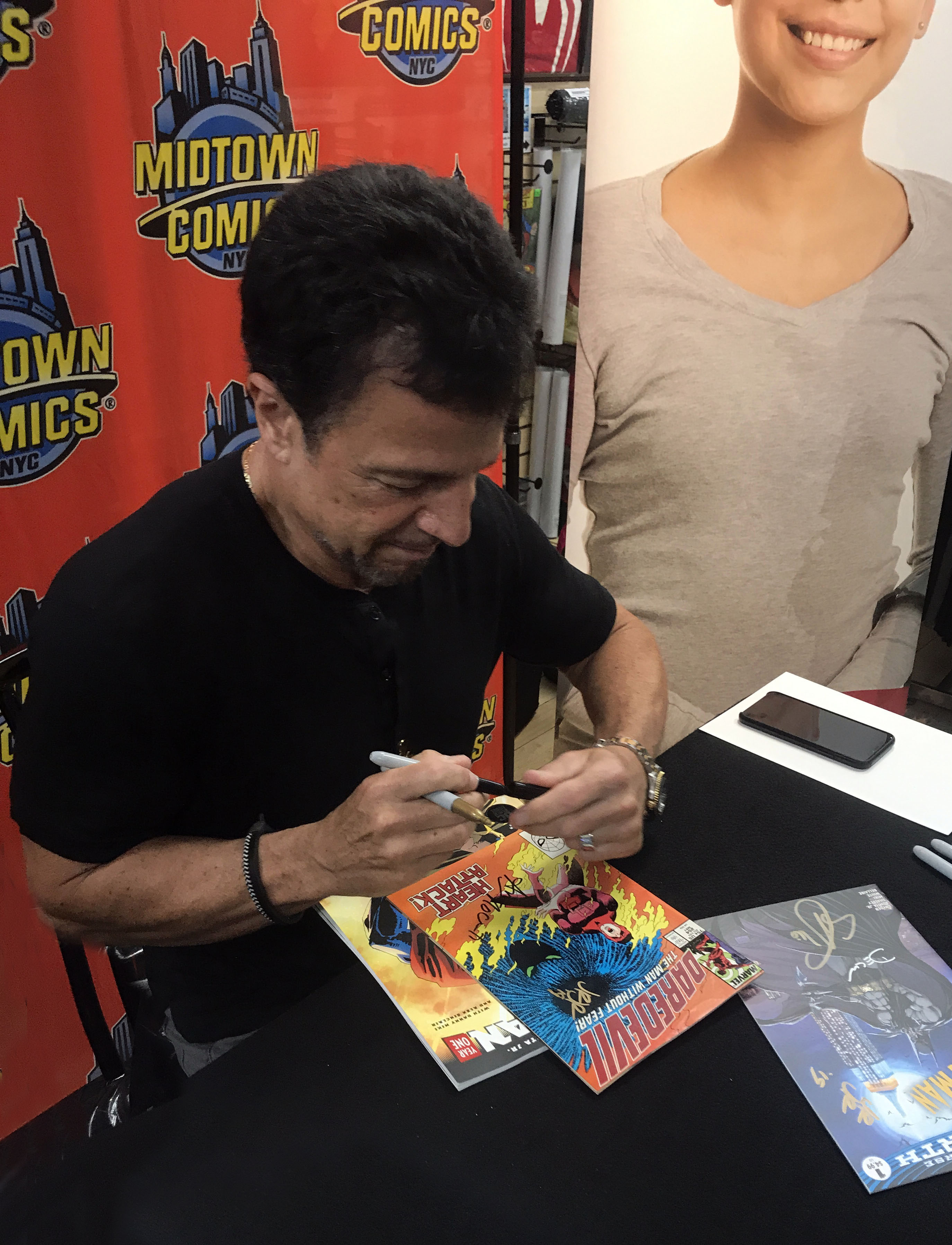
Artist John Romita Jr., signing a copy of issue 254 of the series at Midtown Comics in Manhattan

Frank Miller returned to the character and his origins with the 1993 five-issue Daredevil: The Man Without Fear miniseries. With artist John Romita Jr., Miller expanded his retcon of the life and death of Murdock's father, Jack Murdock, and Murdock's first encounters with the Kingpin and Foggy Nelson. The story fleshed out the role of Stick in the genesis of Daredevil, as well as the beginning of Murdock's doomed love affair with Elektra. In this rendition, Elektra is more dominant and active as a character, and more sexually aggressive. For this story, Miller and Romita cited Walter Mosley and Mickey Spillane as inspirations. Throughout the series, Murdock wears a black cloth wrapped around his eyes and the top of his head, rather than a traditional costume. Miller initially prepared the series as a scenario for a proposed TV series.

The creative team of Chichester and McDaniel returned with their "Fall From Grace" storyline in issues #319–325 (Aug. 1993 – Feb. 1994). In this period, McDaniel emulated Frank Miller's later style in the noir crime comic Sin City. Elektra, who was resurrected in #190 but had not been seen since, finally returns. This was controversial at the time, because she was previously a character who had only been written by Frank Miller, and he opposed other writers re-introducing her. Chichester and McDaniel also incorporated aspects of Miller's Elektra: Assassin miniseries. An injured Daredevil creates a new armored costume, and takes on the alias "Jack Batlin". His secret identity becomes public knowledge, leading to him fake his own death. This new identity and costume lasts for several story arcs, until a short stint by J. M. DeMatteis returned Daredevil to his traditional red costume and Matt Murdock's identity. Under Karl Kesel, the title gained a lighter tone, with Daredevil returning to the lighthearted, swashbuckling hero depicted by earlier writers.

In 1998, Daredevil's numbering was rebooted, with the title "canceled" with issue #380 and revived a month later as part of the Marvel Knights imprint. Joe Quesada drew the new series, written by filmmaker Kevin Smith. Its first story arc, "Guardian Devil", depicts Daredevil struggling to protect a child whom he is told could be the Anti-Christ. Murdock experiences a crisis of faith exacerbated by the discovery that Karen Page has AIDS (later revealed to be a hoax) and her subsequent death at Bullseye's hands. Black Widow also returns to the series. When Daredevil discovers that the true party responsible for the scheme is Mysterio, who is dying of cancer, he leaves Mysterio to commit suicide. Smith indicates that he was particularly influenced by Miller's earlier groundbreaking work on the character. Quesada says that his art was influenced by Art Nouveau and the work of Alphonse Mucha, in pictorial development of organic curves and shapes.

Smith was succeeded by writer-artist David Mack, who contributed the seven-issue "Parts of a Hole" (vol. 2, #9–15). The arc introduced Maya Lopez, also known as Echo, a deaf martial artist. Critics have commended the character and the story as a complex and multifaceted portrayal of a disabled Latina and Indigenous superhero. Mack's style is particularly experimental and allusive; he collaborated with Quesada, whose pictorial storytelling is more straightforward.

=== 2000s ===
The 2001 Daredevil: Yellow miniseries presented another take on Daredevil's origins, purporting to illustrate letters written to Karen Page after her death. The series depicts the early rivalry between Matt Murdock and Foggy Nelson for Page's affection, and incorporates many events depicted in the earliest issues of Daredevil. The supervillains the Owl and the Purple Man appear as antagonists. In this story, Daredevil credits Page with coining the phrase "The Man Without Fear", and she suggests to Daredevil he wear all maroon instead of dark red and yellow.

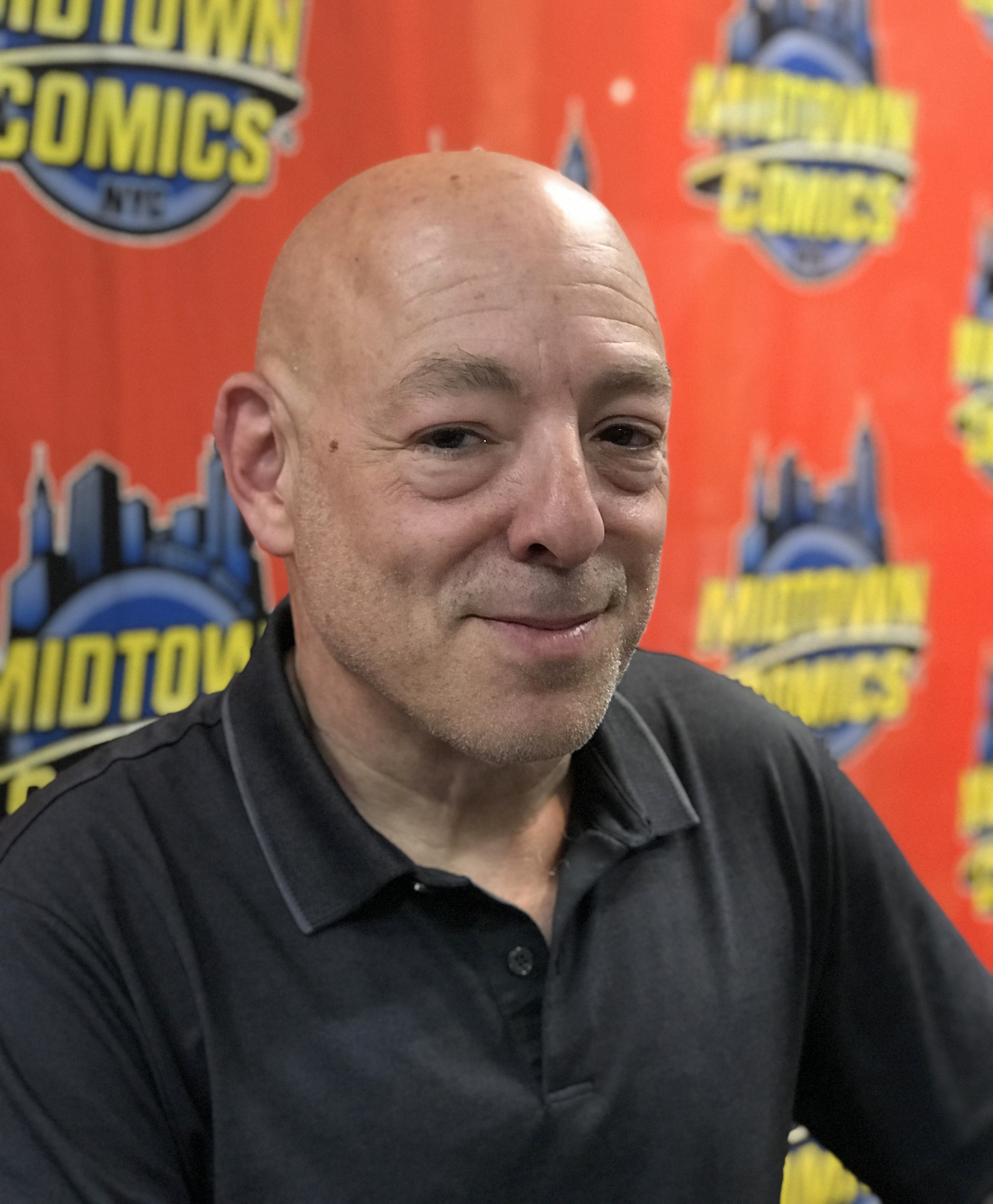
Brian Michael Bendis wrote a long run of Daredevil stories in the 2000s.

David Mack brought colleague Brian Michael Bendis to Marvel to co-write the "Wake Up" arc in vol. 2, #16–19 (May 2001 – August 2001), which told the story of the troubled young son of Leap Frog. After an interlude, Bendis resumed his arc in issue #26 (December 2001), again collaborating with Alex Maleev, with whom he had previously worked on Sam and Twitch. As with Miller, Bendis and Maleev approached the series as a crime comic. In this run, Murdock meets his romantic interest and future wife Milla Donovan, who is also blind. Bendis's storyline also explores the re-emergence of the Kingpin and the betrayal of him by his associates. When Kingpin attempts to return to power, Daredevil beats him to the point of incapacity and declares himself a new "kingpin" of Hell's Kitchen, forbidding all criminal activity. In the Bendis and Maleev period, Daredevil's identity is leaked, first to the FBI and subsequently to the press. He becomes desperate to hold onto his increasingly tenuous secret identity, willing to make enormous sacrifices in service of this goal. At the conclusion of Bendis's storyline, Murdock is arrested and imprisoned alongside his adversaries, with the FBI hoping that he will be killed by his enemies. Bendis won an Eisner Award for Best Writer for his work on Daredevil, as well as other concurrent titles, in 2002 and 2003. Daredevil by Bendis and Maleev also won the Eisner for Best Continuing Series in 2003. Bendis says he was congratulated for this achievement by Frank Miller. However, Miller joked with him that the award was also his; Bendis responded that he was "glad that he knew I knew that without him, nothing we did would have existed." At the time he concluded it, Bendis had the longest tenure as writer in the history of the series, although this period was later exceeded by Mark Waid. Quesada briefly returned to the character, writing the miniseries Daredevil: Father (2004–2006).

The impact of the exposure of Murdock's identity as Daredevil continued as a plot point in storylines by the new creative team, writer Ed Brubaker and artist Michael Lark, beginning with Daredevil vol. 2, #82 (Feb. 2006). Brubaker says that, in his view, "Daredevil is one of the most experimental mainstream comics there is," and cites inspiration from noir fiction. Brubaker's arc begins with Murdock imprisoned. Another character masquerades as Daredevil in Hell's Kitchen. Murdock later discovers this ersatz Daredevil is his friend Danny Rand, the superhero Iron Fist. Brubaker re-introduced the classic villain Mister Fear and brought private investigator Dakota North into the series. Brubaker also created the new characters Master Izo, another blind warrior who founded the Chaste centuries ago, and Lady Bullseye, a female admirer of the earlier nemesis. Brubaker won Eisner Awards for Best Writer for his work on Daredevil and other titles in 2007, 2008, and 2010. At the conclusion of Brubaker's arc, Daredevil assumes leadership of the ninja army the Hand. This becomes the theme of Andy Diggle's new story line, beginning in 2009.

=== 2010s and 2020s ===
In 2010, Daredevil continues to lead the Hand with the intent of transforming them into an organization that seeks justice. However, when Bullseye kills over a hundred people with a bomb, Daredevil and the Hand launch an onslaught of vengeance. In the ensuing arc, "Shadowland", Daredevil makes the city block that Bullseye destroyed into a fortress administered by the Hand. Murdock returns to his senses after a battle with Elektra and several superheroes. The story reveals that Murdock's erratic behavior is caused by a demonic possession. Purged of the demon by his allies, Murdock departs New York, and becomes the leading character of a new miniseries titled Daredevil: Reborn. He leaves his territory in the hands of the Black Panther in the briefly retitled series' Black Panther: Man Without Fear #513.

In July 2011, Daredevil relaunched with vol. 3, written by Mark Waid. Waid focuses on the character's powers and perception of the physical world. The Waid period also emulates Stan Lee's earlier, more light-hearted tone, recalling the earlier work of Kesel. Waid includes more sombre undercurrents; he suggests "the idea that Matt would be suffering from a severe depression that he masks with a swashbuckling style." He introduces a new love interest for Murdock, fellow lawyer Kirsten McDuffie. During Waid's series, Daredevil's true identity is an open secret, although he maintains a veneer of denial. Waid won the Eisner Award for Daredevil in 2012. Daredevil also joins the New Avengers in a story written by Bendis. Waid also wrote a fourth volume of Daredevil, in which Murdock moves back to San Francisco to practice law.

A new volume, written by Charles Soule with art by Ron Garney, began in February 2016. In this series, Murdock returns to New York, where he now works for the District Attorney. Flashbacks in a later story arc reveal how Murdock regained his secret identity: Supernatural entities alter the memory of everyone on earth except Foggy Nelson. Timothy Peters describes this plot twist as "fantastically ludicrous" but necessary to set up the future plot machinations that depend on the social discrepancy of a secret identity. Peters views the subsequent storyline as an intriguing illustration of contemporary expectations and perceptions about the legal system. Using his restored secret identity, Murdock is able to take advantage of a subsequent court case to establish a precedent for superheroes testifying in court without the need to expose their secret identities. Despite interference from the Kingpin, Murdock succeeds in taking this precedent to the Supreme Court so that all superheroes will have the same rights in future cases. Soule himself has a law background, adding verisimilitude. Soule's series also introduces a new black costume for Daredevil, and a new crime-fighting partner, Blindspot. Soule also created the new villain Muse. He later collaborated with Phil Noto on the Death of Daredevil arc. In Soule's tenure, Kingpin becomes Mayor of New York City, a plot point that continues into stories written by his successor.

In April 2019, the series began a brand-new volume written by Chip Zdarsky and with art primarily by Marco Checchetto. In the Zdarsky arc, Daredevil temporarily quits his superhero activities out of guilt after killing a thief accidentally. When a team of villains invades Hell's Kitchen, he returns to fight alongside Elektra and ordinary citizens who have collectively adopted the "Daredevil" identity. In the aftermath of the battle, he gives himself up to police custody. He continues to conceal his face with his mask, stating that he wants to stand trial for his crimes but will only do so on the condition that his identity is never revealed. He voluntarily confesses to the killing and is sentenced to a prison term. While Murdock serves his time, Elektra takes up the Daredevil costume and protects Hell's Kitchen. In the prison, Murdock grapples with the idea that Daredevil and Matt Murdock work together to put people in prison, which he comes to see as ruining people's lives without reforming them. Zdarsky was nominated for an Eisner Award for his writing on this series. The series lead into the crossover event "Devil's Reign" with the same creative team. The story line concerns Mayor Fisk's attempts to outlaw superheroes and his subsequent struggle for power with Daredevil and allies such as Iron Man and Spider-Man. Following the conclusion of that series, another Daredevil series, also written by Zdarsky, was launched in July 2022.

A new volume, written by Saladin Ahmed and drawn by Aaron Kuder, began in November 2023. The series begins with Murdock reborn as a priest. Ahmed was approached for the book by editor Devin Lewis, partly on the strength of his earlier street-level work on Miles Morales: Spider-Man. Ahmed stated he would only take the assignment if he had an original concept for the character, and that his idea which was centered on Murdock's spirituality and social conscience happened to align with the status quo Zdarsky had planned for the end of his run. In the new volume, Murdock operates as a Catholic priest running a youth center in Hell's Kitchen, with Elektra continuing her own activities as Daredevil alongside him. Ahmed cited Ann Nocenti's earlier work on the title as an influence, particularly her combination of street-level realism with more cosmic and mystical elements. The series was colored by Jesus Aburtov, whose use of red was a subject of early discussion between him and Kuder.

A subsequent volume, written by Stephanie Phillips and drawn by Lee Garbett, launched in March 2026. The run introduces Murdock in a new role as a law professor, and introduces a new villain named Omen. Phillips and Garbett joined the book as a team. Phillips described the run as a soft reboot, intended to be accessible to new readers while still drawing on the character's history. She is the second woman to write a sustained run on the title, after Nocenti.

== Characterization ==
=== Fictional character biography ===
Matthew Murdock is born in Hell's Kitchen, a working-class Irish-American district of New York City. Suffering from post-partum depression, his mother, Maggie, abandons the family and becomes a nun. His father, Jack Murdock, is a struggling professional boxer. Matt's father is loving but controlling and over-protective, and physically abusive on one instance. As a youth, Matt Murdock pushes an older man out of the way of a careening, out-of-control truck containing chemicals; while Matt manages to push the man out of the path of the truck, the truck crashes and spills its radioactive chemical contents onto Matt. The accident blinds him but gives him enhanced senses and powers that give him extraordinary perception of his environment. Matt is mentored by Stick, a mysterious sensei. Matt attends Columbia University and meets Foggy Nelson and Elektra Natchios. Nelson becomes Murdock's best friend, and Elektra becomes Matt's first serious girlfriend. Jack Murdock refuses to throw a fight on orders from a gangster called the Fixer, because he does not want to be humiliated in front of his son. As a result, the Fixer has Jack killed. Matt is driven to bring his father's killers to justice, and eventually does so. The Fixer dies of a heart attack when he is confronted by Matt. As a result of Matt taking revenge, Stick ends his training, believing that Matt is undisciplined. Matt and Foggy found a law firm, Nelson and Murdock. Matt begins a second career as a costumed vigilante.

Karen Page eventually joins the firm, and becomes Nelson's girlfriend after college. He encounters many supervillains. He reveals his secret identity to Page, but she is anxious about the relationship and eventually leaves to pursue a career as an actress in Hollywood. Briefly, Murdock moves to San Francisco and lives with Natasha Romanova, who is also a costumed adventurer under the name Black Widow. After they break up, he returns to New York and begins a relationship with Heather Glenn. However, his on-again off-again girlfriend Elektra returns, now a mysterious and fearsome ninja. Together, they find a criminal organization called the Hand. However, she becomes an enforcer for a local crime boss, the Kingpin. She is eventually killed by a hitman, Bullseye. Karen Page has become a drug addict, and betrays Murdock's confidence by selling his secret identity to criminals. However, she returns to New York and begs forgiveness, which Murdock gives her, and she recovers from her drug addiction. She is later killed by Bullseye as well, however. He then marries Milla Donovan, a woman without superpowers who is also blind. Simultaneously, his secret identity is leaked to the press, and he becomes desperate to cast doubt on the public's suspicions about his activities. For a time, he declares himself a new kingpin of his neighborhood, forbidding criminal activity. Murdock is subsequently imprisoned, and later escapes. He experiences many other adventures and misfortunes. He then assumes control of the Hand, and attempts to employ them as an army against criminals and evil-doers. In the process of doing so, he becomes possessed by a demon, and his efforts go wildly out of control. He is purged of the demon by his friends and allies, and eventually returns to his previous role as an enforcer of justice.

Eventually, it becomes an open secret that Matt Murdock is Daredevil; however, supernatural entities alter the fabric of human knowledge so that Daredevil can again become an unknown, mysterious figure. However, he accidentally kills a common thief. Overcome by guilt, Murdock tries to give up the Daredevil identity and crime-fighting activity. Elektra takes on the Daredevil identity in his stead. He feels compelled to return to such endeavors when a team of supervillains invades Hell's Kitchen; he fights alongside Elektra and a legion of ordinary citizens who have also adopted the "Daredevil" symbolism. Subsequently, Murdock and Elektra battle the Hand, and Murdock is killed. He is then resurrected as a Catholic priest.

=== Personality and motivation ===
Critics have commented that Daredevil is unusually psychologically complex, by the standards of comic-book superheroes.

The character is highly determined and willing to make bold decisions to fight crime in his city. In his public personality, as trial lawyer Matt Murdock, he also tries to defend his clients and to work within the established legal system. Frank Miller argues that Murdock has taken on two demanding careers (as lawyer and vigilante) because of a need to prove himself, compensating for his blindness. Miller believes that, like Batman, Daredevil is driven by his concern for justice, but while Batman is primarily concerned with punishing criminals, Daredevil is more interested in finding redress for victims. The contrast between his love of the law in his regular life and his exceptional vigilante activities often produces problems for him. He is also sometimes ruthless and deceptive, and this can put his friends and loved ones at risk. Timothy Callahan argues that Murdock is often mentally unstable or even psychotic "in his willingness to layer the fabric of lies in his relationships with others." One of his fundamental conflicts is between his attraction to extra-legal justice and punishment and his simultaneous fascination with objective order and legal, rational explanation.

Matt's determination to forgive rather than prosecute whenever possible places Daredevil in a unique situation among comic book vigilantes. Though spurred into heroics by the murder of his father, he's driven consciously by neither revenge (Batman) nor guilt (Spider-Man) but rather by the desire to see justice done.

— Paul Young, Frank Miller's Daredevil and the Ends of Heroism

Miller says that Murdock is drawn to violence because of anger at the world regarding his disability as well as his unresolved conflict with his father. Murdock's father, "Battlin' Jack", was a professional boxer who prohibited Matt from any athletic activity and compelled him to devote his time to study, attempting to mold an entirely different life for his son. Learning of his disobedience, the father resorted to corporal punishment to control his son. These events led Murdock to become obsessed with determining the proper moral and legal rules for behavior, and to develop a highly ambivalent relationship to combat sports and thrill-seeking behavior. Film and comic scholar Paul Young points out that the stories often depict a gap between Murdock's stated motivations and his actions, demonstrating that Murdock has inherently limited self-knowledge and sometimes deceives himself with incomplete justifications for his choices.

Murdock is a devout Catholic and often tormented by religious and moral guilt. However, he also has many romantic affairs, which frequently end badly. Miller also sees the character as driven by sensuality. Psychologist Travis Langley and comics journalist Christine Hanefalk comment that this disposition could be described as a sensation seeking personality trait. They note that while Murdock has had many lovers, he takes the approach of serial monogamy rather than promiscuity or sex addiction.

== Themes and motifs ==
=== Political corruption and moral ambiguity ===
Like other comic books influenced by film noir, Daredevil comics often depict modern urban society as highly corrupt, with no trustworthy authority. The comics frequently present a crisis of authority in which Daredevil or various antagonists, such as Kingpin, attempt to achieve a position of sovereignty to enforce some kind of recognized order. Comics scholars Vernon and Gustafson point out that the comic is generally "resistant to following the norms of the superhero genre" and reveals a paradoxical duality for the hero, who is uniquely vulnerable as well as empowered with extra-legal powers of enforcement. They say that this demonstrates the instability of modern urban society. Daredevil comics also present debates on questions about religion and the relationship between human and divine justice, as well as Christian ideals of forgiveness and generosity. In particular, Matt Murdock is a devout Catholic, and some stories, such as Miller's Born Again, treat themes and traditions particular to the Catholic denomination.

=== Irish Catholic identity and culture ===
From his creation, Daredevil is depicted as having a working class, Irish American childhood. English literature scholar Kevin Michael Scott writes that "When Daredevil first appeared in 1964, there was no other comic that placed its hero so squarely in the realm of the poor and working classes." In the period of Miller's authorship, his characterization emphasized a particularly Irish Catholic identity (Miller comes from an Irish Catholic ethnic background as well). Scholar Matthew Cressler argues that Daredevil's disability has a particular resonance for Catholic culture, because Catholic tradition and folklore presents afflictions or impairments as opportunities for holiness and potential sainthood. Cressler views the Born Again story as particularly inflected with Catholic cultural tradition and in dialogue with Catholic expectations. He argues that the significance of boxing in Daredevil's early life and training has a particular meaning for US Catholic culture, because "boxing was a crucial site for the making of American Catholic manhood in the twentieth century," commended by clergy as a means to learn moral and spiritual discipline. Cressler argues that Born Again also demonstrates a white racial identity beyond Irish Catholic ethnicity, because Daredevil concerns himself with protecting his neighborhood and loved ones from vices and dangers that the narrative associates with minor antagonists who are not white. Cressler associates this with the cultural affinity of Irish Americans with the presidency of Ronald Reagan and his values and rhetoric.

However, Paul Young draws attention to a complex and unresolved combination of social and political values in Daredevil's character and activities; while he sometimes practices violent retribution and law and order principles, he also adheres to social liberalism in his stated ideals and in his moral choices and behaviors. While the character has a clear ethnic and racial identity, fans who are not white have said that they find themselves able to closely identify with Daredevil's characteristics. For example, John Jennings, an African-American professor of Cultural Studies and Black studies, has written that he particularly identified with Daredevil as a child because of Daredevil's childhood poverty, his isolation and feeling of peculiarity, his experience of bullying, and his tenacity.

=== Blindness ===
The comic series also often addresses the challenges of blindness and visual impairment. Comics scholar José Alaniz notes that Daredevil was the first Marvel Silver Age series about a disabled protagonist; he notes that it "proved a landmark for the depiction of disability in a notoriously ableist genre." Daredevil is the best-known blind superhero, and one commentator claims that he is the first. However, fan commentator Christine Hanefalk points out one predecessor in American comic books: Doctor Mid-Nite, created in 1941.

Nonetheless, along with Professor X, Daredevil is one of the first post-World-War-II disabled superheroes. Other supporting characters in the series are also blind, such as Stick. Writer/co-creator Stan Lee said that he was worried that blind people would be offended at how far he exaggerated the enhancement of a blind person's remaining senses, but that his fears were assuaged by letters from organizations such as the Lighthouse for the Blind, which said that blind people greatly enjoyed having Daredevil comics read to them. Alaniz points out that Daredevil is powerful "not in spite of but because of his disability/superpowers; rather than vulnerabilities to be hidden away, they form a crucial part of his identity." He views this as a stark contrast to the general assumptions about disabled people in the period in which Daredevil was first created, when they were often presented as objects of pity.

=== Violence and trauma ===
The stories also often address the long-term effects of trauma and adverse childhood experiences. The early stories first introduce Matt Murdock's complex relationship with his father, and Murdock's experience of loss and drive for justice following his father's murder. Matt Murdock's abandonment by his mother, physically abusive treatment by his alcoholic father, and bullying from childhood peers are all detailed by later stories in the series. Other prominent characters, such as Kingpin and Elektra, are also revealed to have experienced childhood misfortunes that affect aggressive and thrill-seeking behavior in adulthood. In 1981, Miller declared that "violence is actually the theme of the book," insisting on the depiction of realistic injury to convey the hazards and moral ambiguity of a heroic lifestyle.

== Powers and abilities ==
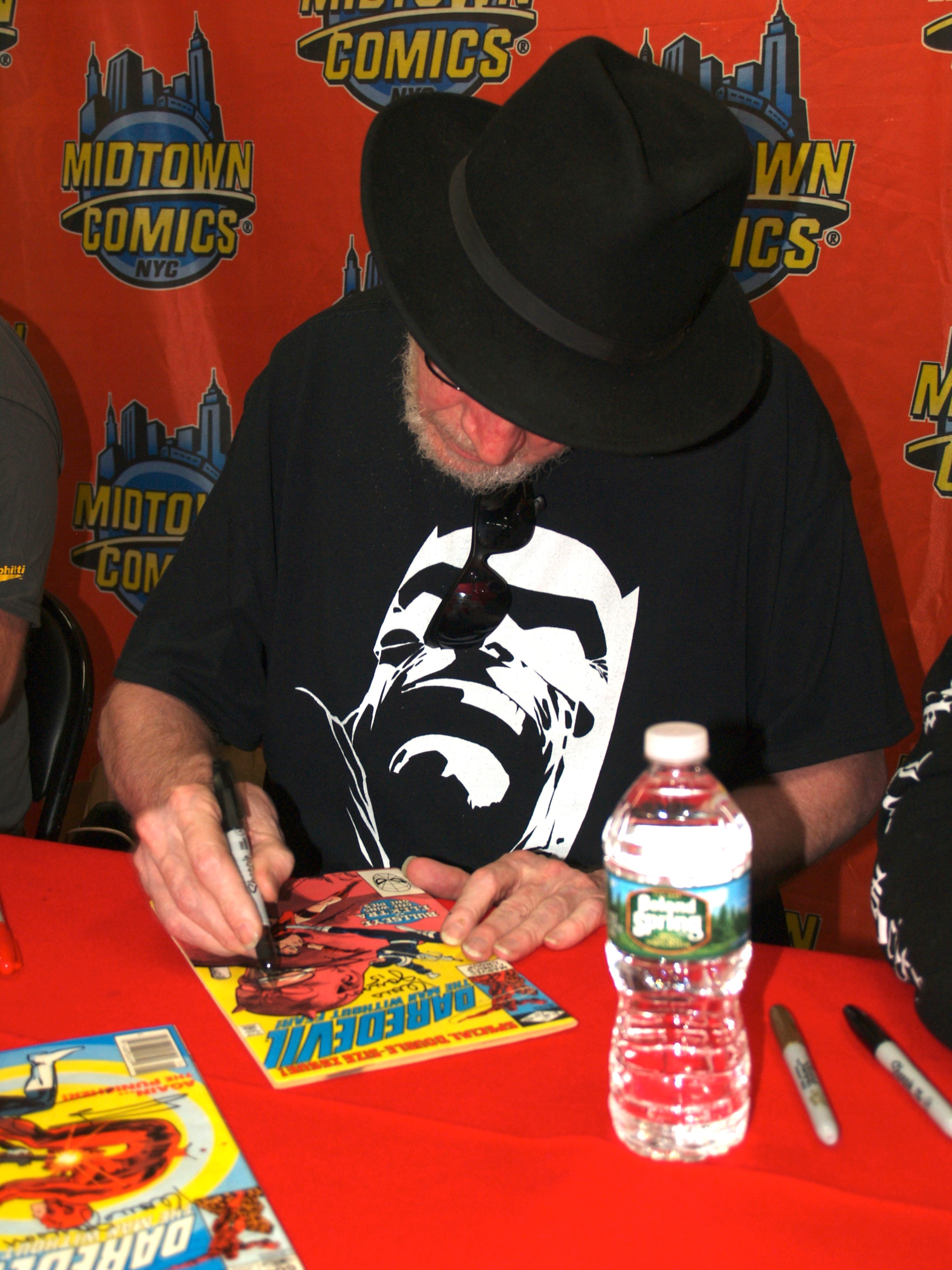
Frank Miller, seen here signing a copy of issue #181 at Midtown Comics, revamped the character's radar-sense to make it more believable.

Although the character is blind, his remaining four senses function with superhuman accuracy and sensitivity, giving him abilities far beyond the limits of a sighted person. Few characters know that the hero cannot see. Generally speaking, the stories operate with the premise that Daredevil compensates for his missing sight with his other heightened senses (in particular, olfactory, auditory, and somatosensory perception).

Daredevil's superhuman hearing functions as a polygraph to determine dishonesty by listening for changes in a person's heartbeat. That said, a person with a pacemaker can avoid detection because of an artificially regular heartbeat. His heightened hearing can in some circumstances cause problems for him as he runs the risk of becoming overstimulated. Daredevil is able to use his hearing to perceive spatial entities and relations, by echolocation. This is an exaggerated depiction of a real ability that some blind people have cultivated. Daredevil can use his sense of smell to orient himself in his surroundings. He can read by passing his fingers over the letters on a page.

Daredevil's radioactive accident led him to develop a "radar-sense", mentioned along with his first appearance. This seems generally synonymous with echolocation. Frank Miller's interpretation of the character makes his abilities somewhat more toned down and realistic. For example, his radar sense is less like clear vision and more like a "proximity" sense Miller derived from the comments of some martial artists.

Daredevil has an enhanced sense of balance and coordination. In most cases, he is depicted as possessing superhuman agility, reflexes, and stamina. In all cases, Daredevil is depicted as a master of martial arts and expert acrobat and gymnast, with his superhuman attributes aiding him in his mastery of these skills.

Matt Murdock was initially self-taught as a boxer, following his father's example. Subsequently, he was trained by Stick to become a master hand-to-hand combatant in martial arts. He practices mixed martial arts, primarily combining boxing with ninjutsu.

Daredevil's signature weapon is his baton, which he created. Disguised as a blind man's cane in civilian garb, it is a multi-purpose weapon and tool that contains cable connected to a steel grappling hook. The club can be split into two parts, one of which is a fighting baton, the other of which ends in a curved hook.

In his civilian identity, Murdock is a skilled New York attorney. He is a detective and interrogation expert.

== Supporting characters ==
=== Elektra ===
Elektra Natchios is a pivotal character for Daredevil, at different times being an enemy, a romantic partner, and an ally. Elektra made her debut as a bounty hunter, and though her initial time as part of Daredevil's rogues' gallery was brief (spanning barely a year of the first Frank Miller series), her romantic past with him is an important part of the mythos. Created by Frank Miller, the character first appeared in Daredevil #168 (Jan. 1981). Her violent nature and mercenary lifestyle has served as a point of conflict between her and Daredevil, which, in 2020, culminated in her becoming the second Daredevil.

Elektra is an unusually ruthless antihero and femme fatale. Scholar Paul Young defines some of her defining initial characteristics as including her succinct speech patterns, her "athletic, eroticized body," her father complex, and her lethal weapons and fighting prowess. He notes that another critic, Larry Rodman, compared her to a "psychotic swimsuit model".

She shows few compunctions about killing her adversaries, and in some stories even kills innocent people. However, she maintains a strong affection for Matt Murdock and, later, other people she admires. She is often morally conflicted, and eventually attempts to use her skills for good. Miller says that Elektra's violent disposition originates from the trauma of the loss of her father, and that he meant the character to illustrate Jung's Electra complex: "She was a young woman who had her sexual interest centered on her father, and just as she was transferring this to another man, her father is killed." Miller argues that this initial anger led to corruption by other forces (the Hand and the Kingpin). In his view she is not essentially good, but rather "one of the villains who's got a weak streak in them."

Elektra returned to the series, resurrected, first in one of the arcs written by D.G. Chichester. She has continued to appear in various subsequent series as a complicated anti-hero. In stories of the 2020s, she even takes on the identity of Daredevil herself, initially because the original Daredevil is imprisoned.

=== Allies ===
Throughout the core Daredevil series, many characters have had an influence in Matt Murdock's life. His father instills in Murdock the importance of education and nonviolence with the aim of seeing his son become a better man than himself, forbidding his son from undertaking any kind of physical training. It is his father's murder that prompts Daredevil to become a hero.

Matt Murdock's closest friend is Franklin "Foggy" Nelson, his college roommate, sidekick, and law partner. Their relationship in the early years of the series was fraught with tension due to Nelson's sense of inferiority to Murdock as a lawyer and as a rival for the affections of their secretary, Karen Page. The pudgy and fallible Nelson has often been used by writers for lightheartedness and even comic relief. However, in some stories Nelson is a close confidante to Murdock; when his secret identity is restored by supernatural means, only Foggy continues to be aware that Murdock and Daredevil are the same person. Ben Urich, a reporter for the Daily Bugle, often appears in Daredevil stories. An investigative reporter, Urich shares some of Daredevil's intellectual abilities but does not have any kind of fighting prowess. He discovers Daredevil's identity and eventually becomes his friend as well.

The anti-hero Punisher is one of Daredevil's reluctant allies, as well as his antagonist due to their different philosophies in crime-fighting. Daredevil is somewhat unusual among superheroes in that he does not generally work consistently with a group of teammates. However, he has worked alongside the Defenders and the Avengers. In 2011, Daredevil joined one version of the Avengers, led by Luke Cage, as well as one of the iterations of the Defenders. In a variety of stories in the comics, Daredevil works together with Jessica Jones, Iron Fist, and Luke Cage, as individuals or in a group.

=== Romantic interests ===
Daredevil has a convoluted and often tortured love life. His relationships often end badly. The longest connections he has maintained with women have been with other costumed fighters: Black Widow and Elektra. The relatively high number of violent deaths for his partners has been criticized as examples of the women in refrigerators trope, according to which female characters in comic books are often disposable and serve as plot devices to motivate or complicate male heroes.

Murdock had a long-term relationship with Karen Page. Initially, Murdock and Foggy Nelson constituted a love triangle with Page, with each vying for affections. Murdock revealed his secret identity to her in Daredevil #56 (September 1969). Page has various doubts and anxieties about her relationship. However, in Daredevil #86 (January 1972), Page leaves to pursue an acting career in Hollywood. She returns at a low point, trading his secret identity for drugs. He forgives her and they continue to maintain an on-again off-again relationship for years; in the Nocenti and Chichester periods, she helps Murdock to operate a legal clinic and pursues progressive causes. Like Elektra, Page is murdered by Bullseye; but she is never resurrected.

In the 1970s, he had a romantic relationship with Black Widow, who fought crime with him while they were in San Francisco. They cohabited, a daring choice for the time. She complained about Daredevil's sexist attitudes, and broke off the relationship because she felt subordinate. They remain close confidantes in ensuing stories. Some critics suggest that the series consistently presents Black Widow as the best match for Daredevil.

In the later 1970s, Daredevil began a relationship with heiress and party girl Heather Glenn. He revealed his identity to her in a 1977 storyline. As Young puts it, Glenn has "a casual and flirty manner, and a voracious sexual appetite;" she is also elusive and casual regarding her relationship with Murdock. Young compares to her to one of the Sternwood sisters from Chandler's The Big Sleep. Glenn eventually kills herself, in Daredevil #220 (March 1985). As initially characterized by Gerry Conway, Glenn is somewhat stereotyped because of her flighty nature. However, Young argues that the Frank Miller period gives her a degree of verisimilitude, even arguing that she has more depth than Chris Claremont's female heroes. In contrast, J. Andrew Deman has argued that Miller's depiction of women is much more stereotypical than Clarement's. The period of stories authored by Ann Nocenti has been commended for its complex, iconoclastic approach to Daredevil's female supporting characters and love interests.

In the late 1990s, he had a brief relationship with Maya Lopez, a deaf woman and skilled martial artist. While Murdock and Lopez fell in love, Lopez was manipulated by the Kingpin into believing that Daredevil had killed her father (while it was Kingpin himself who was responsible). Under the name Echo, Lopez fought Daredevil and was eventually convinced of his innocence.

In the 2000s, Murdock marries a woman named Milla Donovan. Donovan shares Murdock's disability. Eventually, one of Daredevil's enemies drives her to insanity.

=== Enemies ===
In his early years, Daredevil fought a number of costumed supervillains, such as the Owl, the Purple Man, and the Matador. The early characters were sometimes viewed as derivative of Spider-Man's rogues' gallery. Gladiator, introduced in 1966, went on to become a complex and sympathetic character in later stories. Marv Wolfman introduced the psychopathic assassin Bullseye in 1976.

Frank Miller's run on Daredevil pared down the rogues gallery to Kingpin, previously introduced as an antagonist of Spider-Man, and Bullseye. The Kingpin learned Daredevil's secret identity in the "Born Again" storyline. In Daredevil #254, Ann Nocenti introduced Typhoid Mary, an assassin for the Kingpin with dissociative identity disorder (the diagnostic term for multiple personalities), who would become a prominent Daredevil foe. Nocenti created Typhoid Mary after reflecting on experiences working in asylums for the mentally ill, about the condition of bipolar disorder, and about stereotypes regarding women in comic books.

Subsequent writers, such as Jeph Loeb, Brian Michael Bendis and Ed Brubaker, have re-introduced the Daredevil's rogues gallery of the 1960s, particularly the Owl.

== Reception ==
Daredevil has served as a source of inspiration for comic readers with disabilities, particularly those with visual impairment. The singer Tom Sullivan, a blind man, has written that "when I read my first Daredevil in the mid-'60s, I decided Matt Murdock represented everything I thought I could be." Further, he argued that blind people sometimes experience enhanced awareness of other senses, like Daredevil; he credits inspiration from Daredevil with cultivating his own abilities. Literature professor José Alaniz says that the character is particularly groundbreaking as a depiction of an empowered blind person, and significant for the perceptions of disabled people more generally.

However, the series was not particularly popular until the period of Frank Miller's authorship. Steve Gerber, who briefly wrote the series in 1973, comments that in that decade Daredevil "sold fairly consistently but not very well, so there was nothing major at stake if the writer flubbed it." In contrast, during Miller's era circulation doubled, to average sales of 276,812 copies per month. His story arcs on Daredevil were the only sales competition for Chris Claremont's Uncanny X-Men, the consistent top seller in the 1980s. Comics scholar Sean Howe compares Miller's innovations on the title to the contemporaneous punk rock movement; in his characterization, "Miller ripped it up and started again, with a stripped-down vocabulary and a throwback to the grit, violence, and threat of the early 1950s." Award-winning novelist Colson Whitehead declared that "Frank Miller doing his Daredevil magic ... his weird, scary New York ... made me want to write." Miller's Daredevil was also innovative in the degree of violence that could be depicted in a mainstream superhero comic book, particularly in the instance of the murder of Elektra by Bullseye in 1982. Daredevil was also a primary inspiration for the Teenage Mutant Ninja Turtles. The concept took its ninja imagery from Daredevil. In the original comics, the characters were even implied to be the pet turtles of Matt Murdock, who mutated as a result of the same accident that gave him superpowers.

However, by the mid-1990s sales had greatly declined, to such an extent that the series was in danger of cancellation. For this reason, it was revamped under the "Marvel Knights" imprint, which encouraged input from creators outside traditional mainstream comics. Joe Quesada, an editor at Marvel, says that filmmaker Kevin Smith's authorship of the "Guardian Devil" arc of the Daredevil series in 1998-1999 "changed everything" and that this is "probably the single most important development in this particular era of comics, from the '90s to today." Quesada says this is because Smith was the first Hollywood director to write a mainstream superhero comic, and this encouraged subsequent authorship of comics by writers from film, TV, and literature. Smith's tenure also garnered high sales and media recognition. This storyline won Eagle Awards, accolades chosen by comics fans in the United Kingdom, for story and inking.

== In other media ==
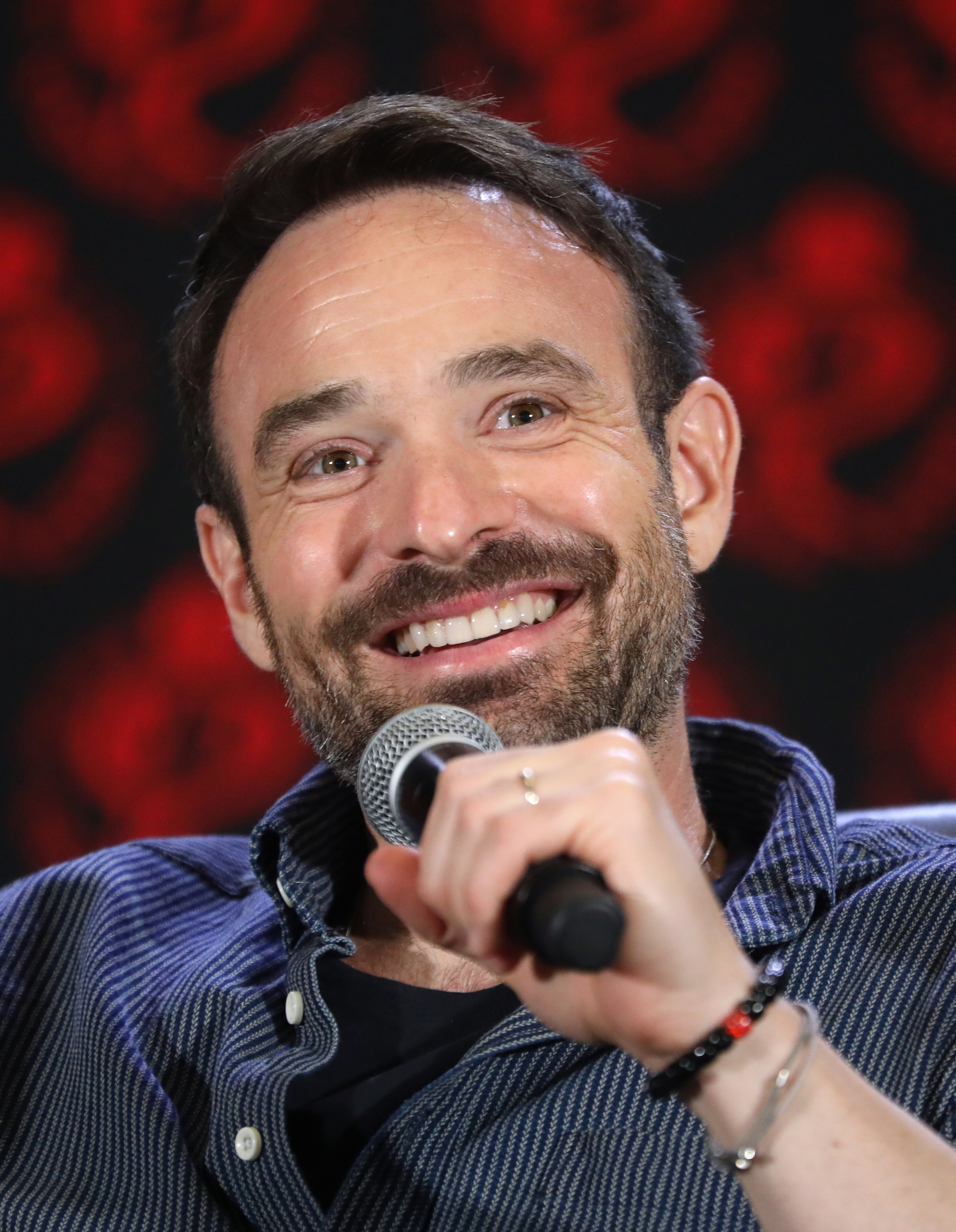
Charlie Cox portrays Daredevil in the Marvel Cinematic Universe.

Daredevil has appeared in various other media, particularly in television and film.

He was first adapted in the television film The Trial of the Incredible Hulk (1989), portrayed by Rex Smith. A Daredevil live-action feature film starring Ben Affleck as the character and directed by Mark Steven Johnson was released in 2003. The film received mixed reviews from critics, and was a moderate box-office success.

=== Marvel Cinematic Universe ===
In 2015, a Daredevil television series set in the Marvel Cinematic Universe, starring Charlie Cox as the protagonist and created by Drew Goddard, premiered on Netflix and lasted for three seasons until 2018. It was acclaimed by critics and attracted a cult following from fans. Executive producer Steven S. DeKnight said that it took inspiration from the Frank Miller period as well as the storylines by Brian Michael Bendis and Alex Maleev, with Maleev's art in particular providing "a template for the look of the show". Then-Disney CEO Bob Iger stated that Marvel's Netflix series, such as Daredevil, could later be adapted as feature films if they were sufficiently popular. A revival and continuation of the series, Daredevil: Born Again, premiered on Disney+ in 2025, with Cox reprising the role. Cox also plays the character in the film Spider-Man: No Way Home (2021), and the miniseries The Defenders (2017), She-Hulk: Attorney at Law (2022), and Echo (2024). Cox also voices the character in the animated series Your Friendly Neighborhood Spider-Man (2025), based in an alternate timeline.

== See also ==
- List of Daredevil titles
- 1964 in comics
- Animal echolocation
