= Tony Salmons =

American comic artist (born 1957)

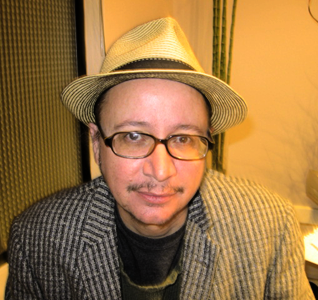
- Born: Thomas Anthony Salmons; January 1, 1957 (age 69) Rolla, Missouri, U.S.
- Areas: Comic book artist, storyboard artist, character designer
- Notable works: Vigilante: City Lights, Prairie Justice; Batman: Gotham Knights; Captain America: Red, White & Blue; Dakota North; Savage Sword of Conan; Marvel Fanfare; G.I. Joe: A Real American Hero; Batman: The Animated Series

Thomas Anthony "Tony" Salmons (born January 1, 1957) is an American alternative comic book artist, film storyboard artist, and character designer.

== Biography ==
Born in Rolla, Missouri, Salmons grew up in Casa Grande, Arizona, with stops in New York City and San Francisco. Salmons now lives and works in Los Angeles and has two daughters.

Salmons illustrated the comic book mini-series The Strange Adventures of H.P. Lovecraft, from Image Comics, later collected in trade paperback.

== Works ==
=== Television ===
- Batman: The Animated Series, Season 1, 1992, Warner Bros.
- Æon Flux, 1995, MTV.

=== Books/Comics ===
- Amazing High Adventure #1, 1984, Marvel.
- Batman: Gotham Knights #4, 2000, DC.
- Batman: Legends of the Dark Knight #85, 1996, DC.
- Captain America: Red, White & Blue, hardcover, 2002, Marvel.
- Conan Saga #76, 1984, Marvel.
- 2000 AD, Crisis #40, 1990, Fleetway.
- Dakota North #1-5, 1986–87, Marvel.
- Dark Horse Presents #6-7, 9-10, 1986, Dark Horse.
- Doctor Strange #64, 1984, Marvel.
- Doomed #2, 2006, IDW.
- Dragon's Teeth #1, 1983, Clegg.
- First Six-Pack #2, First.
- The Foot Soldiers #2, 1997, Image.
- 411 #1, 2003, Marvel.
- Gangland #4, 1998, DC/Vertigo.
- G.I. Joe: A Real American Hero #69, 87-88, 91, 1988–89, Marvel.
- G.I. Joe Yearbook #4, 1988, Marvel.
- Heartthrobs #2, 1998, DC/Vertigo.
- Heroes Against Hunger #1, 1986, DC.
- Jon Sable Freelance #54-55, 1987–88, First.
- Justice #5, 1987, Marvel.
- The Mark #1, 1987, Dark Horse.
- Marvel Comics Presents #9, 1988, Marvel.
- Marvel Fanfare #17, 19, 27, 1984–86, Marvel.
- Marvel Vision #16, 28, 1997–98, Marvel.
- Nightmask #1, 1986, Marvel.
- Penthouse Comix #22-23, 1997, Penthouse.
- Penthouse Men's Adventure Comix #3, 1995, Penthouse.
- Peter Porker #8, 1986, Marvel.
- Savage Sword of Conan #107, 109, 113, 118, 165, 1984–85, 1989, Marvel.
- Savage Tales #3, 1985, Marvel.
- Star Wars #91, 1985, Marvel.
- Strange Adventures of HP Lovecraft #1-4, 2008–2009, Image.
- Taboo #9, 1995, Kitchen Sink.
- Timeslip Collection #1, 1998, Marvel.
- Vigilante: City Lights, Prairie Justice #1-4, 1995, DC/Vertigo.
- Web of Spider-Man Annual #1, 1985, Marvel.
