= Foggy Nelson =

Marvel Comics fictional character

- Foggy Nelson as depicted in Daredevil #27 (June 2013). Art by Chris Samnee.

Publication information
- Publisher: Marvel Comics
- First appearance: Daredevil #1 (April 1964)
- Created by: Stan Lee (writer); Bill Everett (artist)

In-story information
- Full name: Franklin Percy Nelson
- Species: Human
- Team affiliations: Nelson & Murdock; Hogarth, Chao & Benowitz; Jeryn Hogarth & Associates; Nelson, Murdock & Page (Marvel Cinematic Universe)
- Partnerships: Deborah Harris; Marci Stahl; Matt Murdock; Karen Page
- Supporting character of: Daredevil; Spider-Man

Franklin Percy "Foggy" Nelson is a fictional character appearing in American comic books published by Marvel Comics. The character has been depicted as part of the supporting cast of Daredevil (Matt Murdock); Foggy is Matt's best friend and, for most of the series, his law partner. The character was created by Stan Lee and Bill Everett. Initially, Foggy was portrayed as a deeply conflicted character, continuously caught between his strong vocational disagreements with Matt, their rivalry for the affections of Karen Page, and his loyalty to his friend. Despite being a highly successful lawyer, he is also tormented by feelings of inferiority to his law partner. However, since the early 1980s he has often been reduced to comic relief, and his down-to-earth, everyman lifestyle acts as a contrast to his grim superhero colleague.

For the first couple years of Daredevil, Foggy's appearance greatly varied from issue to issue, though he was most commonly drawn as a trim, handsome, and neatly groomed young man. Since his first portrayal by Gene Colan, in Daredevil #20, he has consistently been drawn as a short, slightly pudgy man with a generally relaxed appearance.

Foggy was portrayed by Jon Favreau in the film Daredevil (2003), and by Elden Henson in television series of the Marvel Cinematic Universe, including Daredevil (2015–2018), The Defenders (2017), the second season of Jessica Jones (2018), the second season of Luke Cage (2018), and Daredevil: Born Again (2025–2026).

== Publication history ==
Foggy Nelson first appeared in Daredevil #1 (April 1964), and was created by Stan Lee and Bill Everett.

Foggy Nelson received an entry in the Official Handbook of the Marvel Universe Update '89 #5.

== Fictional character biography ==
=== The Beginning ===
Foggy is Matt Murdock's roommate while they study at Columbia Law School. Matt protects Foggy against bullies and helps him study. When Matt begins dating Elektra Natchios, Foggy disapproves, because he thinks she is dangerous. After Elektra leaves the university, Matt and Foggy transfer to Harvard Law School. After graduating, Matt and Foggy open up a private law practice. They hire a secretary, Karen Page, with whom both Matt and Foggy fall in love. Foggy soon realizes that Karen is in love with Matt, and sees him as only a friend, dealing a heavy wound to his ego. He is approached by Abner Jonas to be a third-party candidate for district attorney, and in a party given by Jonas, Foggy meets an old high-school classmate, Deborah Harris. He is smitten with her, and she returns his romantic interest. However, Daredevil uncovers that Jonas is secretly the criminal mastermind The Organizer, that Debbie is Jonas's lover, and that her flirtation with Foggy was solely a means to get him under their control. Foggy helps foil the Organizer's plans, and Debbie is taken to jail. Nelson is heartbroken and again turns his attentions to Karen Page.

Foggy, unaware of his partner's double life as a superhero, is suspicious about Matt's sudden and unexplained absences, and his frequent bruises. To avoid those suspicions, Murdock resorts to creating his "twin brother" Mike Murdock (Matt himself in disguise), faking his death, or asking someone else to wear the costume. To Foggy's dismay, Karen becomes as enamored of Mike Murdock as she is of his "brother" Matt. To further his frustration with Matt, despite Foggy's repeated protests that his preference is for corporate law, his partner favors taking on costumed supervillains as clients, occasionally even leaving Foggy no choice but to represent the supervillain at trial.

=== District attorney ===
Nelson is again approached to be a candidate for district attorney, this time without hidden agendas: he is very fond of the idea of being able to do something to fight crime actively, and sets himself to work with enthusiasm. Shortly after, Debbie Harris's jail term expires, and she immediately gets in touch with Foggy. She and Foggy start to date again, despite Foggy's fears that it would be bad for his campaign to date an ex-convict, as well as his doubts as to the motives for Debbie's interest in him. While dating her publicly for the first time since her incarceration, Debbie is ransomed to the Time Continuum by the Unholy trio, led by the Exterminator. Foggy and Daredevil investigate, each on his own side. Foggy is made a prisoner by the Exterminator and Daredevil comes to the rescue. A fight ensues and there is an explosion, after which Foggy finds some rags of the DD uniform: it is then assumed that "Mike Murdock" has died. Debbie returns from the Time Continuum and she and Foggy resume their happy relationship.

There is a schism between Matt and Foggy, as due to Matt's troubled relationship with Karen, and his own troubles as Daredevil, he does not help Foggy in his campaign. Foggy feels abandoned and Matt is not able to explain without revealing his secret. However, Foggy wins the election, the two reconcile and Foggy offers Matt an opportunity to become assistant to the DA.

Later, Foggy is blackmailed by the mysterious Mr. Kline, and is forced by him to prosecute Black Widow, who is defended by Matt. This again severs their longtime friendship and Matt leaves for San Francisco with the Widow. They again reconcile when Foggy is badly wounded while investigating a criminal conspiracy by Black Spectre, and Matt comes back to New York to help him in his fight against crime.

=== The Storefront ===
After losing the re-election for District Attorney to Blake Tower (and a slurring campaign against him by Jester, who had earlier failed to coerce Foggy into ending his campaign for district attorney), Foggy resumes his career as counselor, again with Matt, in a free clinic called "The Storefront". Becky Blake, a law student, is later hired to work as the firm's secretary.

Foggy proposes to Debbie, and they are married.

Elektra is hired by the Kingpin to assassinate Foggy. However, upon confronting Foggy, he recognizes her as "Matt's girl". Unable to kill Foggy after this, Elektra abandons her assignment, which leads to her death at the hands of Bullseye.

=== The decline and fall of Nelson and Murdock ===
Foggy's marriage begins to go sour, as he is an easy going fellow whom his wife wants, unsuccessfully, to transform into a high socialite. The jaded Debbie begins having an affair with Micah Synn, chieftain of a savage tribe, and she coerces Foggy to lie in Synn's favor. An abusive brute, Synn later takes Debbie prisoner. After escaping, she immediately returns to Foggy, and he publicly admits his lies to denounce Synn's crimes. Despite this, their marriage is badly damaged and they eventually divorce.

In addition, Foggy's behavior in the Synn case damages the Nelson and Murdock firm's reputation, and Murdock loses interest in his work and devotes more time to his costumed career. Foggy cannot fight alone against the lack of clients and the cascading of bills, and the Nelson & Murdock premises are closed down. Foggy is so depressed that he considers suicide, but after he is caught in a fight between the Vulture and Daredevil, the immediacy of death makes him realize that he much prefers to be alive.

Following a bad breakup with Matt and a robbery of her apartment, Glorianna O'Breen turns to Foggy for comfort; he reassures her but rejects her romantic advances out of loyalty to Matt. At the same time, Matt is accused of paying a witness to perjure himself, and Foggy acts as his attorney. Despite a frameup by the Kingpin, Foggy gets Matt released without jail time. After the trial, Matt disappears and the Kingpin, impressed by Foggy's performance at the trial, has him hired through one of his firms, Kelco. With Matt gone, Foggy begins dating Glorianna while working on an appeal to have Murdock's law license reinstated. As Kelco's attorney, Nelson defends the company against charges from a boy who was blinded by toxic waste they deposited in rivers. Glorianna is disillusioned with and eventually leaves him. Foggy quits his job with Kelco when he learns that the company is owned by the Kingpin. He and Matt are later reunited, and he helps Matt win back his law license.

When Daredevil's identity is outed to the press by an assistant of Ben Urich, Murdock fakes his death. Karen and Foggy later find Matt still alive, in a state of stupor, in his yellow Daredevil uniform but without the mask. Foggy finally realizes Matt's secret identity. They reconcile and become law partners again.

=== "Sharpe, Nelson & Murdock" ===
Rosalind Sharpe, a famous and controversial Boston attorney, offers for Nelson and Murdock to become her associates. It is later revealed that Rosalind Sharpe is Nelson's biological mother: she divorced her husband and abandoned her son in order to be able to pursue her career as a lawyer. It was Sharpe's career that enticed her son to become a lawyer.

Foggy starts dating Liz Allan, remaining with her through such moments as the 'resurrection' of her father-in-law Norman Osborn. Later, the villain Mysterio manipulates him into having an affair with another woman, and then makes it appear Nelson murdered the woman after the affair (which Foggy cannot remember clearly as he was drugged by Mysterio). Liz visits Foggy in prison, where he Foggy confesses to cheating on her, and she leaves him. After the machinations by Mysterio are disclosed, Foggy is set free, but he feels bad about having failed Liz, and does not attempt to resume the relationship.

Sharpe fires Foggy, as she does not want the murder affair to bring bad publicity to the firm. When Matt Murdock starts preparing Foggy's defense, she orders him to stand down, resulting in Matt quitting the firm out of disgust.

Foggy personally counsels superheroes on diverse occasions, such as when he takes the case of the superhero Vance Astrovik, who killed his abusive father in a fit of rage. Foggy loses the case, as his opposition convinces the jury that Vance could have stopped his father without killing him. Other clients he personally represents are Carol Danvers and the Fantastic Four, to whom he recommends not to accept a buy offer for the FF estate by the Gideon Corporation (although Reed Richards ultimately decides to sell).

=== Nelson & Murdock ride again ===
In the aftermath of Karen Page's murder, Foggy and Matt find themselves without their women and without their jobs. Murdock finds out that he is the sole beneficiary of Karen's wealth. He proposes to Nelson to resume their partnership, using the money to build the new premises where Matt's old house — blown up by the Kingpin — had once been. Nelson responds with enthusiasm. Rosalind Sharpe tries to contact Foggy to offer him work again, without success.

Matt is revealed to the world as Daredevil and eventually arrested. After Foggy goes to visit Matt in prison with private investigator Dakota North, he is stabbed and seriously injured by several inmates. Foggy is placed in the witness protection program, and officially declared dead sometime after the ambulance takes him away. Foggy recovers from his wounds and assumes a new identity. He attempts to escape in an effort to reunite with Matt, only to be captured by the Mafia, who in turn are killed by ninjas. They return him to his former captors, after informing him that they would be watching.

Foggy, fleeing from his life in protected custody, reaches Matt's home and they are reunited. Along with Becky Blake, Foggy successfully clears all of Matt's troubles with the Law and the Bar. Murdock and Nelson ask Becky to join their firm as a new partner and move to new quarters, taking only referrals to avoid being easily located by Daredevil stalkers.

=== Nelson, Blake and Murdock ===
Foggy finds out that Matt made a deal with the Kingpin. Hurt that Matt would not even talk to him before making a deal with a man who has made both their lives miserable, he fires him from the law firm, effectively cutting Matt off from his normal life and making it easier for him to join The Hand. Foggy blames himself for Matt's going over the edge.

Foggy is later disbarred due to contempt of court. Foggy goes to visit the judge with Dakota, and they use a compromising photograph to force him to tell the truth about his and Dakota's recent misfortunes, and learn that the judge is on the Kingpin's payroll. Recognizing these actions were intended to get at Matt, Dakota decides the two of them need to locate Matt. Foggy Nelson arrives at the gates of the Shadowland Fortress and tries to reach Matt verbally, but is ignored. Foggy scales the walls to reach Matt, where he is intercepted by White Tiger. She leads him to Daredevil. Matt decides to kill Foggy, but he is "purged" of the demon controlling him by Iron Fist.

Foggy is reinstated as an attorney and moves his office to a new location since his previous office was burned down during the riots. He has to run his business by himself after Becky Blake resigns. Foggy helps Black Panther, Matt's temporary replacement in Hell's Kitchen, to establish a new identity for himself by providing him with false immigration papers. Matt returns to Hell's Kitchen and assures Foggy that he has found a new place to establish Nelson and Murdock and that he should be able to fix his problems and get his law license back.

=== The new Nelson and Murdock ===
While Foggy and Matt start up their private business again, problems arise when the previous allegations of Matt Murdock being Daredevil are brought up during the first case. As a result, they begin training their clients on how they can represent themselves in court. However, Matt is eventually forced to leave New York for good when a case requires him to officially confirm his identity as Daredevil.

=== Post-Secret Wars ===
After the reconstruction of reality, Matt assists the Purple Children – the children of his old foe the Purple Man, who have inherited their father's powers – and in return, they erase all public knowledge that Matt Murdock is Daredevil. The only person Matt re-reveals his identity to is Foggy, who occasionally resents the pressure this puts him under.

== Reception ==
In 2022, CBR.com ranked Franklin Nelson 6th in their "10 Most Powerful Lawyers In Marvel Comics" list.

== Other versions ==
=== 1872 ===
A Wild West-themed alternate universe version of Foggy Nelson from the Battleworld domain of the Valley of Doom makes a minor appearance in the Secret Wars tie-in miniseries 1872. This version is a judge for the town of Timely.

=== Marvel 1602 ===
An alternate universe version of Foggy Nelson from Earth-311 makes minor appearances in Marvel 1602. This version is a ship captain.

=== MC2 ===
A possible future version of Foggy Nelson from Earth-982 appears in Marvel Comics 2. By this time, this version married Liz Allan and became a step-father to Normie Osborn after Matt Murdock was murdered.

=== Ultimate Marvel ===
An alternate universe version of Foggy Nelson from Earth-1610 appears in series set in the Ultimate Marvel imprint. This version was Matthew Murdock's college roommate.

== In other media ==
- Foggy Nelson appears in the film Daredevil (2003), portrayed by Jon Favreau.
- Foggy Nelson appears in television series set in the Marvel Cinematic Universe, portrayed by Elden Henson. First appearing in Daredevil (2015–2018), he makes subsequent appearances in The Defenders (2017), the Jessica Jones episode "AKA Sole Survivor" (2018), the Luke Cage episode "All Souled Out" (2018), and Daredevil: Born Again (2025–2026).
