= Ben Urich =

Marvel Comics fictional character

- Ben Urich as depicted in Daredevil #16 (May 2001) by David W. Mack

Publication information
- Publisher: Marvel Comics
- First appearance: Daredevil #153 (July 1978)
- Created by: Roger McKenzie (writer); Gene Colan (artist)

In-story information
- Full name: Benjamin Urich
- Team affiliations: Front Line; Daily Bugle; New York Bulletin
- Supporting character of: Daredevil; Spider-Man

Benjamin "Ben" Urich (/ˈjʊərɪk/) is a fictional character appearing in American comic books published by Marvel Comics, usually as a supporting character in stories featuring Daredevil and Spider-Man.

Urich is a investigative journalist for the New York newspaper The Daily Bugle. Urich deduced the secret identity of Daredevil, and has used him as a source of information, and vice versa. To a lesser extent, he has a similar relationship with Spider-Man, whose alter ego Peter Parker, a photographer for the Bugle, occasionally accompanied Urich on assignments. Urich has used these connections to expose supervillains posing as businessmen including Kingpin and Green Goblin.

He was portrayed by Joe Pantoliano in the 2003 film Daredevil, and by Vondie Curtis-Hall in the first season of the Marvel Television streaming television series Daredevil, set in the Marvel Cinematic Universe (MCU).

== Publication history ==
Created by Roger McKenzie and Gene Colan, Ben Urich first appeared in Daredevil #153 (July 1978).

== Fictional character biography ==
Ben Urich first appeared in Daredevil stories, where he investigated Wilson Fisk, a businessman who was secretly the Kingpin, the head of the New York criminal underworld.

Urich plays a vital behind-the-scenes role in the Punisher limited series Circle of Blood (drawn by Mike Zeck). When a younger, less experienced Punisher plays into the Kingpin's ruse, he leaves a message for Urich. The resulting story results in the murders of several mafia men and the deaths of many civilians.

Urich learns the secret of Daredevil's identity, but refuses to divulge it. He is drawn into the circle of revenge the Kingpin has planned for Daredevil. Urich tries to overcome the intimidation but the threats come closer to home. His fingers are broken and he hears the death of a witness over the phone. The would-be hit-woman turns state's evidence and Urich and several allies go to interview her. One of his self-proclaimed 'entourage' and a prison guard turn out to be Kingpin assassins. Urich defeats one by a severe pistol whipping. The witness is killed. Kingpin uses Nuke to try to take out all his enemies, but the attempt fails. Urich uses public support to destroy the Kingpin's empire.

Urich later takes on another criminal businessman, Norman Osborn, also known as the Green Goblin. After Osborn's presumed death, Urich writes an exposé book on the man's many crimes, titled Legacy of Evil. During the course of research for the book, Urich helps Spider-Man and Molten Man save Liz Allan's son from kidnappers who resembled the Green Goblin. His research helps the trio go through the Goblin's history and discover what had really gone on. When Osborn turns up alive, he discredits Urich and the book, going to great effort to clear his name. Urich refuses to retract his exposé on Osborn despite being threatened by him and risking his career, and investigates him further to prove that Osborn is a criminal.

Urich becomes colleagues with his nephew Phil Urich. Though unsure at first, Phil proves to be a skilled investigator. Though his work life is professional, his personal life is in shambles, causing him and Urich to become endangered.

During the period where Daredevil's identity was exposed in print, Urich refuses to confirm it to J. Jonah Jameson on the principle of protecting his sources, and his status at work suffered for it. Jameson moves beyond this argument when he assigns Urich to the new supplement, The Pulse. During this assignment, he reveals to Peter Parker that he knows his identity as Spider-Man. It is also around this time that Matt Murdock sets up a meeting with Urich to privately declare he is ending their professional relationship to avoid anyone else discovering this connection and using Urich to get to Murdock.

Urich is approached by the Kingpin to act as journalist covering the Kingpin brokering a deal with the FBI for release and reinstatement of his wealth, in exchange for proof that Daredevil is Matt Murdock. To Urich's horror, he is forced to lead the FBI to Daredevil's location.

=== "Civil War" ===
During the 2006 "Civil War" storyline, Urich is one of the main characters in Civil War: Front Line, covering Iron Man's side as an embedded journalist on behalf of the Daily Bugle. His neutrality is called into question after a confrontation with the Green Goblin, who was supposed to be in prison at the time, but had been secretly released as part of one of Iron Man's plans. After insisting to J. Jonah Jameson that it was him, Urich is fired.

At the end of Civil War: Front Line, Urich leaves the Daily Bugle, with Jameson's blessing and understanding, and forms the online newspaper Frontlines.com with Sally Floyd. The two later establish the print newspaper Front Line.

=== "World War Hulk" ===
During the 2007 "World War Hulk" storyline, Urich and Floyd, in their capacity as the new editorial staff of Front Line, are two of the few reporters who cover the alien invasion in close proximity, at times too close as they end up dodging live fire to get 'soldier on the street' interviews. During the course of those events, Sally Floyd learns that J. Jonah Jameson was the mysterious financial backer of the publication, a fact which they agreed to hide from Urich, lest it kill his spirit.

=== "Secret Invasion" ===
During the 2008 "Secret Invasion" storyline, Urich is covering a story in a local hospital, only to be trapped inside during the Skrull attacks. He survives, though a new-found nurse friend and all the others inside are killed by rampaging Skrulls. Urich and many other human refugees make their way to Stark Tower, though few are aware a human-hunting Skrull with a large body count hides within. The Skrull is killed via human trickery.

After the invasion ends, Urich learns that his wife has died; the exact manner is left unclear. He hits both an incredible depression and writer's block. After taking some time off and seeing the city begin to recover, he starts to recover himself. He then gets word of Norman Osborn's rise to power and confronts him at the press conference announcing the control of the Thunderbolts Initiative over S.H.I.E.L.D. and the Avengers, only to get brushed off by Osborn. This ultimately breaks Urich's writer's block, prompting him to write his return article: "Dark Reign: Norman Osborn Takes Control".

=== "Siege" ===
In the 2010 "Siege" storyline, following a superpowered disaster in Chicago, Urich teams up with his old friend Bill Stern, a disgraced former reporter who rescues him from police custody. By coincidence they find Volstagg of the Warriors Three, who was involved in the disaster. The trio travels to Oklahoma, intent on covering Osborn's siege of Asgard. All three end up separating and encountering each other due to Osborn's attacks on Asgard. All three work to save and evacuate Asgardians, with Urich leading the effort.

=== "Shadowland" ===
During the "Shadowland" storyline, Urich is forced by gang members to write about Bullseye's funeral. He manages to leave his notebook in Essex County Morgue. Daredevil finds it and leads a rescue mission. The funeral service is interrupted by Daredevil and the Hand, as a massive brawl breaks out, almost killing Urich.

=== "Goblin Nation" ===
During the 2014 "Goblin Nation" storyline, Urich learns of his nephew's identity as the new Hobgoblin, and attempts to arrange a meeting to talk Phil down and convince him to accept a cure for the Goblin formula, but when Robbie Robertson is discovered in the area, Phil believes that Urich had been trying to set a trap and delivers a serious injury to Robertson before The Superior Spider-Man (Doctor Octopus' mind in Peter Parker's body) appears. Phil is able to get away when Urich convinces Spider-Man to take Robbie to hospital, but Urich makes it clear that he had no interest in protecting Phil and was simply trying to help Robbie while he could still be saved, accepting that Phil liked what he had become and was uninterested in redemption or help.

With the Daily Bugle declining, Urich approaches Jessica Drew and convinces her to assist him with investigating potential stories and cases, both local and nationwide. The two are later joined by Porcupine, with the three working together as an investigation and battling team.

== Other versions ==
=== "House of M" ===
An alternate universe version of Ben Urich makes a cameo appearance in the 2005 "House of M" storyline.

=== Marvel Noir ===
An alternate timeline version of Ben Urich appears in Spider-Man Noir. This version is a jaded cynic and substance abusing reporter from 1933 who blackmails crime boss Norman Osborn for money to feed his drug habit. After taking idealistic social activist Peter Parker under his wing, Urich "takes back control of his life" before he is killed by the Chameleon.

=== Ultimate Marvel ===
An alternate universe version of Ben Urich from Earth-1610 appears in the Ultimate Marvel imprint. This version is marginally younger than the mainstream incarnation, works as a top reporter at the Daily Bugle, and displays no connection to Daredevil.

=== Secret Wars ===
Two alternate universe versions of Ben Urich from Battleworld appear in the 2015 series Secret Wars.

- An armored version of Ben from the domain of Technopolis appears in Armor Wars #3. This version is the uncle of Peter Urich / Spider-Man. After they discover the truth behind Technopolis' past, they are killed by Tony Stark.
- A Wild West-themed version of Ben from the domain of the Valley of Doom appears in 1872 #1.

== In other media ==
=== Television ===
Ben Urich appears in Daredevil (2015), portrayed by Vondie Curtis-Hall. This version is a struggling African-American journalist at the New York Bulletin who is later killed by Wilson Fisk.

=== Film ===
Ben Urich appears in Daredevil (2003), portrayed by Joe Pantoliano. This version is bald and works for the New York Post.

=== Video games ===
- The Ultimate incarnation of Ben Urich appears in Spider-Man: Battle for New York, voiced by Robin Atkin Downes.
- Ben Urich appears in Marvel Heroes, voiced by Tim Blaney.

=== Miscellaneous ===
- Ben Urich appears in Marvels, voiced by Clifford "Method Man" Smith.
- An unrelated Ben Urich appears in The Intuitionist, written by Colson Whitehead.
