= Bullseye (Marvel Comics) =

Supervillain appearing in Marvel Comics

- Textless variant cover of Spider-Boy #15 (January 2025). Art by Todd Nauck.

Publication information
- Publisher: Marvel Comics
- First appearance: Daredevil #131 (March 1976)
- Created by: Marv Wolfman (writer); John Romita Sr. (artist)

In-story information
- Alter ego: Lester (surname unrevealed)
- Team affiliations: Dark Avengers; Thunderbolts; Assassins Guild
- Notable aliases: Benjamin Poindexter (Note: Initially spelled "Pondexter"); Leonard McClain; Lester Jangles; Daredevil; Hawkeye
- Abilities: Master marksman; Innate ability to use almost any object as a lethal projectile; Skilled hand-to-hand combatant and martial artist; Enhanced durability via adamantium skeleton

Bullseye is a supervillain appearing in American comic books published by Marvel Comics. Created by writer Marv Wolfman and artist John Romita Sr., the character first appeared in Daredevil #131 (1976) and has endured as one of the superhero Daredevil's two archenemies, alongside the Kingpin. Bullseye has appeared consistently in Marvel Comics since his creation, featuring in solo limited series, series focused on Daredevil, and company-wide storylines.

Bullseye is a psychopathic assassin and marksman capable of using almost any object as a lethal projectile with exceptional accuracy. While his first name has been revealed as Lester, his surname remains unknown, although he has used the alias Benjamin Poindexter on several occasions. Introduced as a gimmick villain, the character was redefined during writer-artist Frank Miller's tenure on Daredevil in the early 1980s, which critics and historians have credited with making Bullseye a menacing and psychologically complex figure whose sadism drives his crimes as much as his profession does. The character's bones were later reinforced with adamantium following a severe injury, increasing his physical resilience.

Bullseye's most consequential stories focus on his rivalry with Daredevil, including Frank Miller's Daredevil #181 (1982), in which he kills Daredevil's love interest Elektra, and Kevin Smith's Daredevil vol. 2 #5 (1999), in which he kills Karen Page. He also plays a prominent role in the company-wide storylines Civil War (2006–2007), when he serves on the Thunderbolts, and Dark Reign (2008–2009), when he joins Norman Osborn's Dark Avengers under the alias of Hawkeye. Bullseye's obsession against Daredevil has driven the majority of his appearances, although he has also clashed with the Punisher, Black Widow, and Hawkeye.

The character has been adapted in various media incarnations, having been portrayed in live-action by Colin Farrell in the film Daredevil (2003), and by Wilson Bethel in the third season of the Marvel Cinematic Universe television series Daredevil (2018) and its revival Daredevil: Born Again (2025–present).

== Publication history ==
Bullseye was created by writer Marv Wolfman during his run as writer-editor on Daredevil (#124–139, 141–143). Wolfman imagined the character as a counter to Daredevil's radar sense, reasoning that while Daredevil excelled at close-quarters combat by anticipating his opponents' movements, a villain capable of striking from a distance with unconventional projectiles would pose a unique threat. Bullseye's core concept of weaponizing any object has defined the character in every subsequent iteration. Wolfman brought the concept to artist John Romita Sr., then Marvel's art director, who designed the costume. The character first appeared in Daredevil #131 (1976), with art by Bob Brown and Klaus Janson. Wolfman has stated: "Bob Brown is the artist that drew the book but he didn't co-create [Bullseye]. I had come up with the character, designed a rough version of the costume and then sat down with John Romita Sr. to do the final version." Wolfman later acknowledged that he was never fully satisfied with his handling of the character, remarking in an interview with fansite ManWithoutFear.com, "I never found the thing that made him mine the way Frank Miller did a year or two later."

After Wolfman's departure, fill-in writers used Bullseye occasionally in a lighthearted manner. Writer Roger McKenzie, who took over Daredevil in the late 1970s, made the character more dangerous in a 1979 three-part storyline in which Bullseye kidnapped the Black Widow to draw Daredevil into a confrontation, and began showing signs of psychological deterioration. The cover of Daredevil #160, drawn by Frank Miller and inker Klaus Janson, depicted Bullseye strangling the Black Widow with a blow-dryer cord, which signaled a decisive shift in how the character would be portrayed. Shortly afterward, editor Denny O'Neil removed McKenzie from the title and gave Miller full writing control beginning with issue #168.

Miller's tenure transformed Bullseye from a recurring gimmick villain into one of the most dangerous figures in the Marvel Universe. In an interview with CBR, Miller described his approach to the character: "Bullseye is what we call a doppelgänger — the identical opposite of Daredevil in that Daredevil is responsibility, law and order, and Bullseye is complete wild malice. He had already been Daredevil's opponent, but I just made that more of a duel to the death." Miller introduced a brain tumor storyline in Daredevil #169, in which Bullseye's paranoia causes him to perceive every person around him as Daredevil. The storyline culminated in Daredevil #181, in which Bullseye escapes prison and murders Elektra Natchios, Daredevil's former lover, with her own sai. This was a moment that had a lasting impact on the industry at a time when major supporting characters were rarely killed. Marvel Television chief Jeph Loeb later described its significance: "When he killed Elektra in the comics, you realized, 'Oh, this is a hero-killer.' That's a very rare commodity."

Writer Kevin Smith scripted the death of Karen Page at Bullseye's hands in Daredevil vol. 2 #5 (1999), the other murder most closely associated with the character. Smith subsequently began a follow-up miniseries, Daredevil/Bullseye: The Target, illustrated by Glenn Fabry, intending to be the first writer to address Bullseye's status following Page's death; however, only a single issue was released. Writer Brian Michael Bendis, who took over Daredevil during Smith's repeated delays, was initially prohibited from using Bullseye while Smith's miniseries remained nominally ongoing. Bendis later noted that the restriction pushed him toward creating new characters and allowed him to develop a more considered approach to Bullseye by the time he was eventually permitted to use him.

In 2004, writer Daniel Way scripted the five-issue miniseries Bullseye: Greatest Hits, which presented a detailed account of the character's backstory through an interrogation framing device while simultaneously undermining the reliability of everything being revealed. The miniseries developed the character's backstory but also revealed that some or all of it has been fabricated, probably by Bullseye himself; in this series, Bullseye's name was Leonard and his brother's was Lester or, initially, Nate. Way later noted of his approach to the character: "With Bullseye, there's always an angle." Way returned to the character during the Dark Reign era, writing a Deadpool arc in which Norman Osborn dispatches Bullseye to eliminate Deadpool, pairing two characters whose elaborate, unconventional methods of violence made them uniquely matched opponents.

Following "Civil War," Warren Ellis took over writing Thunderbolts and Bullseye became one of the core members of the new team line-up. In the storyline Dark Reign, Bullseye becomes a member of the Dark Avengers under the alias Hawkeye and features in the five-issue limited series Dark Reign: Hawkeye, written by Andy Diggle, with art by Tom Raney. As a member of the Dark Avengers, he has a major role in the crossover Dark Avengers/Uncanny X-Men: Utopia, written by Matt Fraction. He appeared as a regular character in Dark Avengers #1–16 (March 2009–June 2010). Diggle subsequently used the character as the catalyst for the Shadowland crossover event (2010), describing Bullseye's fate at the conclusion of the first issue as years in the making and a character-defining moment for Matt Murdock. Bullseye is killed by Daredevil in Shadowland #1, but is later confirmed alive in Daredevil vol. 3 #26.

== Fictional character biography ==
=== Early life ===
Bullseye grew up in The Bronx, New York City, New York, where he lived with his brother and their abusive father, also known as Kingmaker. He became an expert shot by playing with his brother's rifles. When he was 10 years old, his brother tried to kill their father by setting fire to their home; shortly thereafter, Bullseye was placed in a foster home. In high school, he became a baseball player. An extremely talented pitcher, he was offered a college athletic scholarship, but opted to enter the minor leagues. After three games, he was called up to start a sold-out Major League game. He had surrendered no hits, and in the bottom of the ninth with two outs, he became bored and asked the coach pull him from the game. The coach insisted that he finish the game. After the opposing team's batter mocked him as a coward, Bullseye threw the ball at his head, killing him. He was barred from professional baseball and convicted of manslaughter.

Bullseye's cold demeanor and unique skills led to his recruitment by the National Security Agency as an assassin, then an assignment to train Contras in Nicaragua. After a battle with the Punisher, Bullseye fled and was assigned to infiltrate the Kingpin's criminal empire. He obtained a costume, fled yet again, and became one of the most dangerous hitmen in the world.

All of the above information is given by Bullseye during a subsequent interrogation by US intelligence. Just prior to escaping from custody, Bullseye confesses he made up some or all of his story to amuse himself; for example, he claims that he was really the one who started the fire which burned down his childhood home. The whole capture was a plan by the assassin to gain access to the prison where his father is being held. Bullseye finally gets revenge on his father, leaving him to burn as the prison's security systems torch everything inside.

=== Criminal career ===
Bullseye battles (and defeats) Daredevil at a circus to establish his reputation as an extortionist. Shortly after, Daredevil by chance overhears him in the midst of an extortion attempt and captures him. Bullseye is later hired by Maxwell Glenn to kill Matt Murdock and Foggy Nelson, and Daredevil interferes. Although Bullseye wins again, Daredevil escapes death, and Bullseye's professional reputation is damaged as a result. Seeking to regain his credibility, he challenges Daredevil on live television, but is soundly defeated.

Smarting from this blow to his reputation, Bullseye hires Eric Slaughter's gang and kidnaps Black Widow to bait Daredevil into a revenge bout. Daredevil defeats him again, and the despair of this repeated humiliation drives him to a mental breakdown. It is later revealed that this breakdown was in part caused by a brain tumor, which begins causing migraines, paranoia and hallucinations that everyone he meets is Daredevil. He escapes from prison, but is recaptured by Daredevil, and the tumor is successfully removed. The tumor's symptoms quickly disappear, and defense lawyers are able to have him freed on the argument that his criminal behavior was caused solely by the tumor. He is hired to assassinate the Kingpin, but meets with repeated failure. Inexplicably, this convinces the Kingpin to employ him as a chief assassin, but he is fired the same day he witnesses the Kingpin's humiliating defeat at Daredevil's hands.

While in prison, he learns that the Kingpin has employed Elektra (Daredevil's former lover) as a new chief assassin. After escaping prison, Bullseye attacks and impales Elektra on her own sai. This fails to convince the Kingpin, who says he will only be rehired if Bullseye kills Daredevil. Bullseye attempts to ambush Daredevil, but their battle ends with his arch-foe dropping him from atop a telephone wire. The multi-story fall breaks Bullseye's back, paralyzing him. Japanese scientist Lord Dark Wind liberates Bullseye and has him brought to Japan, lacing his bones with adamantium and thus restoring his mobility.

After encountering the amnesiac Daredevil, Bullseye commits robberies while impersonating Daredevil in an attempt to destroy his nemesis's image. In one of his early heists, he is caught by his mark's disillusioned trophy wife. He becomes enamored of the wife who pleads with him to be taken away by him, but he keeps the wife in his derelict hideout as his lover, attempting to flatter her by showering her with stolen money and jewelry. However, the woman realizes that he is mentally fragile and, frightened by one of his psychotic outbursts, leaves him. Gradually, Bullseye becomes so immersed in his Daredevil impersonation that he believes himself to truly be Daredevil, a confusion which the real hero takes advantage of to defeat him.

=== Thunderbolts ===
Bullseye, along with many other villains, is recruited into the Thunderbolts by Iron Man and Mister Fantastic to hunt down anti-registration superheroes in the Civil War storyline. Afterwards, he is recruited by Norman Osborn into the reformed team led by Moonstone. He operates invisibly and is not seen by the public. He is used as a last resort and has a nano-chain fed into his system, so if he disobeys orders, he will receive an electrical shock.

Bullseye fights American Eagle after having been deceived by Songbird and told that his nano-chain is disabled. During the fight, he simultaneously receives an electrical shock from the nano-chain in his system on order of Moonstone and is attacked by American Eagle. American Eagle beats him severely, mocking him throughout for purposely avoiding fights with superpowered foes, and finally breaks Bullseye's neck. As a result of the damage sustained from both being attacked by a man with superhuman strength and being shocked by the nano-chain, Bullseye is paralyzed, is unable to speak, and has incurred severe brain injuries. Bullseye has his mobility restored via nanomechanical surgery.

=== Dark Avengers ===
As a reward for his role during the Skrull invasion, Bullseye is placed on the Dark Avengers and given the costume and codename of Hawkeye. Bullseye is ordered to eliminate Daredevil, who has become the leader of the Hand. Daredevil (who is going through the trials needed to join the Hand) and Bullseye clash. Bullseye booby-traps a building with 100 people in it. Daredevil continues to battle Bullseye unaware that the building is rigged and that Bullseye has the detonator. When the building explodes, Bullseye escapes and leaves Daredevil to his grief, mocking that if Daredevil had chosen to kill him the people in the building might have been saved.

=== Shadowland ===
In the aftermath of Siege, Bullseye is incarcerated and sent to the Raft. While being transferred there, he manages to kill his captors and escapes. He returns to Hell's Kitchen and arrives at Shadowland, Daredevil's fortress, and is confronted by Daredevil and a legion of Hand ninjas. Bullseye is unprepared for his enemy's newfound ruthlessness as Daredevil dislocates both his shoulders and stabs him through the heart with his own sai, killing him.

=== Return ===
Bullseye's body is stolen by Lady Bullseye and the Hand from S.H.I.E.L.D. custody. Their botched resurrection process leaves Bullseye invalid and reliant on a life support system to survive. To get revenge, he is revealed to be the mastermind behind Klaw, Coyote, and Ikari's actions against Daredevil. He is later found by the hero who defeated Ikari and Lady Bullseye. The warehouse where they are in is destroyed; Bullseye is nearly drowned in radioactive waste, leaving him scarred and blind. Bullseye would go on to have his body fully repaired by the Hand.

== Powers and abilities ==
Bullseye has the ability to throw almost any object as a projectile with incredible accuracy and with enough force to be lethal. Aside from his ability to throw projectiles with lethal accuracy, Bullseye is also skilled in hand-to-hand combat and has been trained in karate. He is also skilled in the use of edged/throwing weapons and conventional firearms. Bullseye has exceptional physical conditioning, with the agility, reflexes, stamina, and speed of a professional athlete. Bullseye also has a high pain tolerance.

After falling from a building, many of Bullseye's bones were reinforced with adamantium. This has increased his resistance to injury in unarmed combat and allows him to perform acrobatic maneuvers that would fracture ordinary bones. Unlike Wolverine, whose adamantium was implanted using stolen and incomplete notes on the bonding process and who survived only because of his mutant healing factor, Bullseye's surgery was performed properly by Lord Dark Wind and thus included the special herb treatment which prevents the body from being destroyed by the implantation.

Bullseye has a compulsive need to study his targets' histories, abilities, and relationships before engaging them. He employs this information to attempt to anticipate his opponents' movements in combat. This compulsion often crosses from the professional into the personal, such as Bullseye's obsession with Elektra. Due to a mutual head injury, Bullseye was able to sense Daredevil's presence psychically for a brief time.

== Reception ==
IGN listed Bullseye as 20th in their "Top 100 Comic Book Villains of All Time", and 35th in their list of "The Top 50 Avengers".

== In other media ==
=== Television ===
An alternate timeline incarnation of Bullseye, Clint Barton, appears in the Avengers Assemble episode "Planet Doom", voiced by Troy Baker.

=== Film ===
Bullseye appears in Daredevil (2003), portrayed by Colin Farrell. This version is of Irish descent, has a shaved head with a bullseye branded on his forehead, and wears biker-metalhead attire. Synergetic with the film's release, Bullseye's comic book counterpart briefly adopted a similar appearance, with his forehead scar being permanently retained.

=== Marvel Cinematic Universe ===
Wilson Bethel as Bullseye in a promotional image for Daredevil: Born Again

Multiple iterations of Bullseye appear in media set in the Marvel Cinematic Universe (MCU).

- Benjamin Leonard "Dex" Poindexter / Bullseye appears in television series set in the MCU, portrayed by Wilson Bethel. Cameron Mann and Conor Proft play the character in flashbacks as a child and teenager, respectively.
  - Introduced in the third season of Daredevil, this version is a psychopathic orphan who killed his baseball coach as a child, underwent psychiatric therapy, and joined the U.S. Army and later the FBI to keep his mental issues at bay until he is corrupted by Wilson Fisk into masquerading as Daredevil to ruin his reputation. After being betrayed and paralyzed by Fisk, Dex's body is surgically-enhanced with Cogmium.
  - Dex returns as the assassin "Bullseye" in Daredevil: Born Again. In the first season, he is freed and hired by Vanessa Fisk to kill Foggy Nelson. In the second season, Dex forms an uneasy alliance with Daredevil and kills Vanessa before being recruited by Mr. Charles into the CIA.
- An alternate version of Bullseye, based on the version from the film Daredevil, appears in the MCU film Deadpool & Wolverine (2024), portrayed by an uncredited Curtis Small.

=== Video games ===
- Bullseye appears in The Punisher, voiced by Steve Blum. This version is an enforcer for the Kingpin.
- Bullseye appears in Marvel: Ultimate Alliance, voiced by Peter Lurie.
- Bullseye appears in Marvel: Ultimate Alliance 2, voiced by Brian Bloom.
- Bullseye appears in Marvel Super Hero Squad Online, voiced by Crispin Freeman.
- Bullseye appears in Marvel Heroes, voiced by Rick D. Wasserman.
- Bullseye appears in Lego Marvel Super Heroes, voiced by Dave Boat.
- Bullseye appears as a playable character in Lego Marvel Super Heroes 2.
- Bullseye appears in Marvel Ultimate Alliance 3: The Black Order, voiced again by Steve Blum.

== Bibliography ==
- Cebulski, C.B., ed (2024). Marvel Encyclopedia: New Edition. DK. ISBN 978-0-5938-4611-7.
