= Karen Page =

Marvel Comics fictional character

- Karen Page, taken from the cover of Daredevil #1 (April 1964). Art by Bill Everett.

Publication information
- Publisher: Marvel Comics
- First appearance: Daredevil #1 (April 1964)
- Created by: Stan Lee; Bill Everett

In-story information
- Full name: Karen Page
- Species: Human
- Team affiliations: Nelson & Murdock; New York Bulletin
- Partnerships: Matt Murdock; Foggy Nelson
- Supporting character of: Daredevil; Ghost Rider
- Notable aliases: Paige Angel

Karen Page is a fictional character appearing in American comic books published by Marvel Comics created by Stan Lee and Bill Everett. She served as the original love interest for Daredevil, working as an office manager for him and Foggy Nelson at their law firm. Page was killed by Bullseye in Daredevil #5 (March 1999), and has remained dead since.

Karen Page was first portrayed in a cameo by Ellen Pompeo in the film Daredevil (2003). Deborah Ann Woll portrays the character in television series of the Marvel Cinematic Universe (MCU), including Daredevil (2015–2018), The Defenders (2017), The Punisher (2017–2019), Daredevil: Born Again (2025–present) and The Punisher: One Last Kill (2026).

== Publication history ==
Karen Page was created by writer Stan Lee and artist Bill Everett, and first appeared in Daredevil #1 (April 1964).

In her first appearances, Karen is the secretary for the law firm of Daredevil's alter ego Matt Murdock and the mutual love interest of both Murdock and his partner Foggy Nelson. Her relationship with Murdock hits a downward spiral when he reveals his secret identity to her in Daredevil #57 (October 1969), setting off a long break-up which concluded with her departure from the series in issue #86 (April 1972). Within these final stories, she trades her profession of secretary to become a film actress.

Comics scholar Alex Segura describes her character in this period: "Like many Silver Age characetrs, Karen's tone and personality seem to evolve depending on who was writing her--at times she is meek and shy; at others she is defiant and driven."

After three years' absence from published stories, Karen returned for a considerable stint as a supporting character in Ghost Rider, starting with vol. 2 #13 (August 1975) and continuing through to #26 (October 1977). During this time, a crossover with Daredevil #138 afforded her a brief return appearance in the series where she got her start. A 1978 appearance in Marvel Two-in-One would prove the character's last showing for over seven years.

Karen returned in Born Again, an award-winning storyline beginning in Daredevil #227 (February 1986) that would ultimately restore her earlier role as Daredevil's love interest. Writer Ann Nocenti gave considerably more development to their relationship and even had Karen acting as a sidekick to Daredevil for the first time in issue #259, in which she goes undercover to help take down a child pornography ring. She was again dropped from the series in issue #263 (February 1989) for another long-term breakup from Murdock, but this time was brought back just two years later, for Daredevil #294 (July 1991).

Karen is killed by Daredevil's adversary Bullseye in Daredevil (vol. 2) #5 (March 10, 1999).

== Fictional character biography ==
Karen Page is first seen being hired by Matt Murdock's partner, Foggy Nelson, as a secretary for the new law firm "Nelson and Murdock". She is infatuated with Matt Murdock from the moment they meet. When Matt introduces her to the adventuring, wisecracking aspect of his personality, in the guise of his "twin brother" Mike, she finds herself equally charmed by this side of Murdock.

Paxton Page, Karen's father, fakes his own kidnapping and death to assume the guise of the villain Death's Head. Karen returns to her parents' home in Fagan Corners, Vermont, to investigate her father's disappearance. Daredevil follows her. In the ensuing battle between Daredevil and Death's Head, Death's Head spills a vat of molten cobalt over Daredevil but realizes that Karen is endangered. This brings Paxton back to his own senses, pushing Daredevil and Karen to safety. He appears to die in this act of self-sacrifice when he is coated in cobalt. After the battle with Death's Head, Daredevil's true identity is revealed to Karen. She constantly fears for Matt's safety, but Daredevil cannot give up fighting crime. Karen eventually leaves Matt and moves to California to pursue her dream of an acting career. She quickly finds work as an actress in a daytime soap opera.

Karen appears alongside Johnny Blaze in a film. After a scene is interrupted by Orb, Katy Milner (Karen's stuntwoman) confides in Johnny about Karen's history of "unhappy romances" including the ones with Murdock and Phil Hickock. Later on, Karen herself falls under the Orb's control. Karen is later offered a role on The Incredible Hulk TV show which was on its first season at the time. She is kidnapped by three ex-stuntmen on the show but is saved by the Thing (who is looking for his own TV show) and the Hulk (who is annoyed at having this show).

Developing an addiction to heroin, Karen's career falters and she is soon reduced to starring in cheap pornographic films. In need of a fix, she sells Daredevil's secret identity to a drug dealer who in turn sells this to the Kingpin. Karen is forced to return to New York, where she meets up again with Matt. Having rebuilt his life after surviving the Kingpin's machinations, Matt helps Karen beat her addiction, and they resume their relationship and begin sharing an apartment.

Realizing that Matt is incomplete without work as a lawyer (having been disbarred), Karen founds a legal clinic, where she counsels drug addicts while Matt provides legal advice as a "ghost lawyer". The clinic is destroyed during a demonic invasion of Manhattan, and Karen discovers hours later that Matt has been having an affair with Typhoid Mary. These combined blows leave her psychologically lost, and she runs away.

She becomes an anti-pornography activist, assists Daredevil and Black Widow in fighting crime on separate occasions and reluctantly starts dating Matt again. At this point, she becomes a radio show host under the name Paige Angel. She eventually realizes that she is too dependent on Matt and that her past is a constant barrier between them. Karen leaves Matt to accept a talk show host position in Los Angeles.

While in California, Karen has a routine blood test as part of an insurance policy application. The supervillain Mysterio, as part of a plan to psychologically destroy Daredevil for one last scheme, disguises himself as a doctor, performs the blood test, and claims that she is HIV-positive. Devastated, Karen returns to New York and tells Matt about the diagnosis. Later, during a fight between Daredevil and Bullseye, Karen is fatally impaled by Bullseye using Daredevil's billy-club.

== Other versions ==
=== "What If Karen Page Had Lived?" ===
An alternate universe variant of Karen Page from Earth-523001 appears in the What If comic "What If Karen Page Had Lived?". This version narrowly survived Bullseye's attack due to him hitting her shoulder instead of her head. After Daredevil's fear of nearly losing her leads to him beating the Kingpin to death and being sentenced to 44 years in the Raft, Karen disappears and Daredevil assumes she committed suicide. Matt is eventually released after 15 years for good behavior, but he emerges as a broken man with no career, no secret identity, and no Karen. However, in the beginning of the comic book, it is revealed that the entire story is the speculation of the main Marvel Universe version of Brian Michael Bendis, the writer himself, who makes a cameo as narrator

=== Secret Wars: Secret Lovers ===
An alternate universe variant of Karen Page from Earth-91240 appears in the Secret Wars one-shot Secret Wars: Secret Lovers. This version came to live with Matt Murdock.

== In other media ==
Deborah Ann Woll as Karen Page in the television series Daredevil

- The name Karen Page appears in the Spider-Man and His Amazing Friends episode, “The Crime of all Centuries” as an acting credit for the fictional film “Dinosaur Destroyer.”
- Karen Page appears in Daredevil (2003), portrayed by Ellen Pompeo.
- Karen Page appears in television series set in the Marvel Cinematic Universe, portrayed by Deborah Ann Woll. First appearing in Daredevil (2015–2018), she makes subsequent appearances in The Defenders (2017), The Punisher (2017–2019), Daredevil: Born Again (2025–present), and The Punisher: One Last Kill (2026).
- An alternate universe variant of Karen Page appears as a playable character in Marvel Strike Force. This version is a member of the Nightstalkers who previously worked as an investigative reporter before she was bitten by a vampire. Ever since, she works with Morbius to control her powers and works with the Nightstalkers to protect innocents under the name "Oath".

== Bibliography ==
- Segura, Alex (2025). Daredevil: The Illustrated History. Insight Editions. ISBN 979-8-88663-920-9.
