= Daredevil: Ninja =

Three-issue US comic book series

- Publisher: Marvel Comics
- Publication date: December 2000 – February 2001
- Genre: Superhero
- Title(s): Daredevil: Ninja vol. 1, #1-#3
- Main character(s): Daredevil; Stone; The Chaste; The Hand

Creative team
- Writer: Brian Michael Bendis
- Artist: Rob Haynes
- Penciller: Rob Haynes
- Inker: Rob Haynes
- Letterer: Rob Haynes
- Colorist: David Self
- Editor: Joe Quesada

"Daredevil: Ninja" is a three-issue Daredevil story arc under the Marvel Knights title' which was written by Brian Michael Bendis, with art by Rob Haynes and David Self. This series was collected into TPB form in late 2001 and has an afterword by Rob Haynes. This 3 issue series details Daredevil's quest to find Stick's stolen Bo Staff, which leads him having to help his old masters ninja team The Chaste against their enemies The Hand all the way to Japan.

== Plot summary ==
The first issue starts with Matt in bed, while a young Asian woman named Trahn, sneaks into his house to steal Stick's bo staff, which had been occupying an honorary position in Matt's basement gym. He then changes into his Daredevil costume and starts chasing after her to get it back. His chase to find who stole Stick's staff leads him to Trahn again and a fellow warrior with her both drinking Japanese tea, whom he fights to a stand still to get the staff back.

It's a fight they seemingly let him win and vanish, at which point he returns home to his apartment and falls asleep in his costume. The next morning Matt sees himself wake up in a foreign locale which turns out to be Osaka, in Japan and that he was drugged during his fight which made him pass out. The drug in question is so sophisticated that Matt has been semi-conscious (and behaving normally) for his entire trip to Japan, yet cannot remember it.

Among his captors he finds Stick's old associate Stone and The Chaste with Trahn being one of them; Stone explains that the Hand is back and that his own group has been severely decimated. They needed Daredevil's help and the fighting over Stick's staff was just a means to test Matt's ability as a fighter, to see if he was still strong enough to help them in their mission.

After reaching an agreement, they next decide to go to The Hand's compound in search of information and encounter a lone ninja who says the “next one” is in New York. This compels them to return to New York in America; while doing so they encounter the rest of the Hand, who are suddenly everywhere. Matt takes care of the situation by calling the police and the fire department for a distraction.

On the plane trip back to New York, Stone has a telepathic conversation with Matt; he explains that Stick himself was apparently the last in a line of incarnations of a particular great hero of Japan who was capable of wielding a powerful sword, which has now been stolen by the Hand. The soul of the warrior is now in a new body and if one side has access to both the sword and the warrior could mean disaster. The objective now is to find either the Hand or the baby before the former can get to the latter. Just as they get off the plane a huge gang of Hand ninjas attack them in the middle of LaGuardia Airport.

This leads to yet another battle, during which Stone and Trahn make an exit without telling Matt after it is over; more or less using him to fight their battle for them. Frustrated, Matt goes home and is not included in what happens next.

Meanwhile, Trahn and her male associate from The Chaste show up at the orphanage where baby Karen from the Guardian Devil storyline is living and they adopt her. Stick has been reborn as Karen, and they take her with them to watch over and protect.

== Collected editions ==
The story arc was collected in a trade paperback as Daredevil: Ninja, Vol. 1.

== Reception ==
The whole storyline of "Ninja" has received mixed reviews from critics.
