= Elektra: The Hand =

Five-issue comic book limited series

- Cover of the 1st issue

Publication information
- Publisher: Marvel Comics
- Schedule: Monthly
- Format: Limited series
- Genre: Superhero
- Publication date: November 2004 – February 2005
- No. of issues: 5
- Main character(s): Elektra; The Hand

Creative team
- Created by: Akira Yoshida; Christian Gossett
- Written by: Akira Yoshida
- Penciller(s): Christian Gossett; Jim Cheung (#1, 5); Ron Lim (#5)
- Inker: Jonathan Glapion
- Letterer(s): Cory Petit (#1-2, 4-5); Randy Gentile (#3)
- Colorist: Guru eFX
- Editor: MacKenzie Cadenhead

Collected editions
- Elektra: The Hand: ISBN 0-7851-1594-3

Elektra: The Hand is a five-issue comic book limited series, written by Akira Yoshida and pencilled by Christian Gossett and published in 2004 by Marvel Comics.

The story depicts the origin of the clandestine ninja organization known as The Hand. The series shows The Hand's bloody formation during Japan's Feudal era.

== Publication history ==
In 2003, when comic book writer Akira Yoshida first started working for Marvel Comics, one idea that he pitched to Marvel editors was Elektra: The Hand, a story that he wanted to write that mainly depicted the origin of the ninja organization. While Marvel editors like the concept of Yoshida's story, they did not green light the series immediately due to there already being a successful Elektra series running at the time. However, in 2004 Yoshida's concept would be brought up yet again during an editors meeting which focused on new concepts and series ideas for the upcoming year. Marvel's editor-in-chief, Joe Quesada brought up Yoshida's idea on depicting the origin of The Hand, "Joe Quesada brought up the idea of revisiting my ideas for The Hand. My Thor editor, Mackenzie Cadenhead, emailed over and asked if I wanted to take another pass and fine-tune the concept, which I did," after tuning his story up and turning in its fresher concept, Yoshida was given the green light to go ahead and bring the story to life.

Yoshida's desire to develop the origin of the Hand can be linked back to his childhood. Having spent his time both in the United States and Japan due to his father being an international businessman, Yoshida developed a fondness for both Japanese manga and American comic books; one American comic that was a favorite of Yoshida's was Marvel's Daredevil. Yoshida discovered the series during Frank Miller's run during the early 80s in which both Elektra and the Hand were inducted into the Marvel Universe, "Frank Millar's run on Daredevil is probably my favorite. It is really an honor for me to be writing [about] these characters that Frank created". During Miller's run on Daredevil, Yoshida became a fan of both Elektra and The Hand stating that his pull to Elektra was due to her being, "a beautiful, tough-as-nails, female assassin," and The Hand as a group of, "bad-ass, near-immortal ninjas." The depth of Miller's characters heavily influenced Yoshida's decision to write this story on The Hand's origin, "All these stories [Daredevil #168-191] greatly influenced my series about The Hand. They set the stage for Elektra and The Hand in the Marvel Universe, and without them there would have been nothing for me to write about," being influenced by Miller's The Hand, led Yoshida to develop a story that would shine a light on the origin of The Hand.

According to Chris "The Red Star" Gossett, penciller of the series, the readers are able to see "the origin of The Hand...learn the ancient tale through her eyes." Using his own culture as the background for the series, Yoshida sets the story during Japan's feudal period which occurred hundreds of years before the stories that inspired him take place. According to series editor Mackenzie Cadenhead, the setting of the story was chosen by Yoshida and set during Feudal Japan to link The Hand's creation to "Japan’s complicated past when it changed its isolationist policy to welcome foreign community." This era in time plays a great role that greatly stirs and motives the story protagonist, Kagenobu Yoshioka, to form The Hand. According to Cadenhead, the series follows Kagenobu in his path to forming The Hand in order to, “remove the foreign influence he sees infecting his homeland.”

When the time came to decide who would bring this tale to life, both Yoshida and Cadenhead had no particular artist in mind to take on the task until Editor C.B. Cebulski suggested Gossett them. Having come into contact with Cebulski while looking for a job with Marvel Comics, Gossett mentioned his familiarity with Feudal Japan due to him being a fan of director Akira Kurosawa—a director who used the time era within some of his films such as Throne of Blood—during his conversation with Cebulski. Seemingly taking Gossett's words to heart, Gossett landed the position as the artist for the series. According to Cadenhead, Gossett's work on the series was “incredible-a perfect fit. He organically understands the sparse world of the story-clean and unadorned, but by no means simplified. His work is incredibly complex in its simplicity.” Likewise, Yoshida found Gossett's artwork for the series "really captured the feel I was going for in my scripts."

Originally planned as a trilogy, Elektra & The Hand was going to be a three-part one-shot comic book series where each series each depicted a certain time period within the organization. Yoshida originally planned the first series, which was published, as the prologue with the second series focusing on what transpired after the first series ending entailing The Hand's influence spreading from Japan to the world outside, and finally the third series would focus on The Hand encountering Stick-Chaste Leader and Sensei-and Elektra herself bringing the entire series to end, ending were they originally started upon their first appearance within the Marvel Universe. However the trilogy may never be published, reasons for this is best summed up by Yoshida who believes due to the, "lower sales on the first mini and the not-so-positive response to the Elektra movie, I am not sure if they will happen." The fate of the next two parts in the series may never be published.

== Plot summary ==
=== Chapter One: Hajime No Ippo "The First Step" ===
The story begins with Elektra and a member of The Hand standing underneath an alcove, they are observing a group of the Hand perform one of their ancient mystic rituals of resurrection on a deceased member. Curious as to how the resurrection is possible, Elektra is not given the answer but is told that the ritual is, “One that is closely guarded.” Assuming that she is not told how the ritual is able to bring back the dead because she is both a foreigner and a woman, Elektra's is proven wrong when the member tells her the ritual was created centuries ago in order to bring back a member of The Hand who was both a foreigner and a woman. Believing that the only way for Elektra to take her rightful place within The Hand's future, the member begins to tell her the tale of how The Hand came to be.

In 1575 in Kyushu, Japan, four boys are returning home from fishing. Three boys surround the other, he is Kagenobu Yoshioka the alleged son of a deceased samurai. As they walk home the boys are mocking Kagenobu, believing his claims to be mere lies to hide the fact that his mother is living in shame due to her selling herself to foreigners traveling through Japan in order to support him. Angered by this comment, Kagenobu violently strikes the boy who makes this claim about his mother. Leaving him to be consulted by the two other boys, he continues on his way home where he walks in to find his mother being mishandled by a foreign Portuguese merchant brandishing a knife to her throat demanding she give him what he has paid for. When the merchant notices Kagenobu standing at the door, he demands Kagenobu's mother does what he says or she will watch him as he kills her son. While threatening to murder him, the merchant pulls out his mother's elaborate three pronged hairpin allowing her hair to fall free. As his mother continues to struggle with the merchant, Kagenobu picks up the falling hairpin, and filled with anger and hatred for the foreigner he raises the hairpin and charges the man stabbing him through his throat instantly killing him before his mother's eyes.

Crying in his mother's arms over what he has done, Kagenobu's mother reassures him that he has done nothing wrong but has acted like any normal samurai would claiming him to truly take after his father. While comforting him, his mother realizes that someone outside of their hovel would have surly heard the commotion and would have informed the authorities. Quickly acting, Kagenobu's mother wipes the blood from her hairpin places it back into her hair, once she has fixed her hair and cleans Kagenobu up she dips her fingers into the merchant's blood and smears it across her kimono. Telling Kagenobu that the authorities do not need to know what truly transpired since she will take full blame for the murder knowing that the punishment for murdering a foreigner would surly result in death. A punishment she does not want her son taking and so creates the story that it was an act of self-defense, when the foreigner became violent after he forced himself upon her he left her no choice but to stab him in order to protect herself.

Pleading with his mother not to take the blame, she quiets Kagenobu down and tells him that by being the respected wife of a samurai she has learned many lessons from him, one lesson in particular is the bushido code which dictates that a true warrior must live and die with honor and that there is no honor in throwing one's life away. Believing that she no longer has a life, his mother tells him that he has his whole life to live, she would gladly take the blame for and pay the price of what he has done with her own life so that his may be spared. Before he can protest once again the Constable arrives outside of their hut, telling him to live and be strong, Kagenobu's mother prepares to cement the probability of her guilt by taking the merchant's knife and plunging it into his lifeless corpse; as she removes the knife the Constable and his men enter the home.

As she resists being arrested claiming she is innocent, the constable and his men are forced to violently subdue her while Kagenobu watches the entire scene unfold before him. As the men begin to drag her from the hut, Kagenobu tries to come to defense but she holds out her blood covered hand and presses it against his chest to keep him back. After finally pulling her away from him, her blood-covered hand leaves behind a hand print upon his shirt, a mark that would become his emblem. As the constable pulls her away through a gathered crowd, Kagenobu watches from the doorway of their hut with anger upon his face as he clutches his mother's fallen hairpin unbeknownst to him that hidden within a tree close by a ninja clothed in all black is closely watching Kagenobu.

The next day at the Inspector's compound, the inspector is visited by Saburo Ishiyama, the Sensei of the Ishiyama Sword School located within the mountain region near the village. Ishiyama is visiting the inspector with a request to provide Kagenobu with a home at his school since he is now an orphan due to his mother being slated for execution for murdering the foreigner trader, if she remained alive the notion would hinder the local governments prospects in strengthen their ties with foreigner traders. Unsure about granting Ishiyama his wish to take in Kagenobu, Ishiyama is able to sway the inspector by claiming the shock Kagenobu is suffering from after witnessing the mistreatment of his mother by both foreigners and local citizens will eventually turn to rage and anger that without proper guidance could be directed at the foreign community since he is surly to blame them for his mother's inevitable fate and if the inspector chooses to avoid that problem he is the only one who may help. Convince that he is the only one who could help matters get better, the inspector allows Ishiyama to take Kagenobu into his care.

After meeting with and introducing himself to a distant and angry Kagenobu, Ishiyama introduces himself as Kagenobu's Sensei before departing the compound. Along their trek to the sword school, Ishiyama suggests that Kagenobu put his past behind him and that he will never see his mother again for she has been executed despite being the one who did not commit the crime to begin with. When Kagenobu asks how does he know, Ishiyama reveals that the recent arrival of foreigners to Japan has troubled him deeply and to make sure they are not a threat to the people, he has ordered spies to keep tabs on foreigners who he finds to be “problem individuals,” and one of his spies happened to be following the man his mother attracted and witnessed Kagenobu murdering him in order to protect her. Ishiyama tells Kagenobu he does not need to worry about what he has done because he will be given a new start, he will be trained in the ways of Bushido, taught martial arts and swordsmanship, learn self-discipline, chivalry, and honor, and will eventually become a samurai. Stopping alongside the gate of the school, Ishiyama holds it ajar and tells Kagenobu it is his choice whether he will walk through the gates. As Kagenobu does this, Ishiyama assures him that by doing so he will walk within the steps of his samurai father, honor the memory of his mother showing that her sacrifice was not in vain, and temper his anger into strengthen his body and sharpening his mind molding him into a warrior who has no equal.

Ten years after walking through the gates and enduring all the training, Kagenobu is now around eighteen years old and is about to take his final test that will determine whether he or fellow top student, Daisuke Sasaki, will graduate from the school and become a fully recognized samurai. As the test begins, Kagenobu manages to best an aggressive Daisuke who immediately attacks him with a wooden katana once Ishiyama calls for them to begin. After parrying Daisuke's attack and throwing his wooden katana at the back of his head stunning him, Kagenobu removes a sai dagger and swiftly places the arm in-between two prongs under his chin and slices the blade across Daisuke's face ending and passing the test. Congratulating Kagenobu on honoring the memory of his ancestors by his achievements and completing his training; during a ceremony Ishyama states that Kagenobu has nothing left to learn within the school and must now enter the world outside of the school for it now awaits him to go into it and leave his mark upon it.

=== Chapter Two: Saisho No Ichigeki “The First Blow” ===
1597- Honshū, Japan, it has been three years since Kagenobu has graduated from Ishiyama Sword School. He is about to enter a duel with a Samurai who, accordingly to Kagenobu, serves a corrupted master who has been brought by the foreigners traveling to Japan. Upon the back of his white kimono, is a black imprint of a hand similar to the one his mother left upon the front of his shirt the last time he ever saw her. The mark has become his emblem, his insignia. After defeating the samurai, Kagenobu continues on his travels as a Ronin, a samurai who is masterless. Traveling all of Japan, Kagenobu has witnessed the corruption of the people in power by foreign influences and has seen firsthand how their corruption has led to the mistreatment of the Japanese civilians.

From everything he has witnessed on his journey, Kagenobu makes a declaration to search the lands for the necessary skills and knowledge that will help him put Japan back into the hands of the people and from the corrupted hands of those in power. His ceaseless journey for knowledge takes him all across Japan, aside from encountering other samurais who serve corrupt masters, he keeps his skills sharp and defined by going under the tutelage of a calligrapher, herbalist, and woodsmen acquiring new sets of skills and knowledge that would benefit him in completing the task he has set for himself.

While sitting within an eatery eating a meal, Kagenobu becomes the source of the locals’ whispers and gossips. They have heard stories about a Ronin samurai with the hand print marked upon his back and now were witness to the lone swordsman within their village. Kagenobu has become known as the samurai who has chosen to walk his very own path refusing to serve any lord or patron, and has been known for encountering and coming out of every battle against many opponents who wish to test their strength against him untouched and unmarked by his opponents. As he sits to himself, a young boy enters the eatery to inform him that another man has come to see him. After paying the boy, Kagenobu steps outside to face his new challenger.

When he approaches the man, hand upon the hilt of his katana, Kagenobu does not remove his sword but acknowledges the man and bows to him in a sign of respect. The man is, Kikuchi, a member from the Ishiyama Sword School who has been searching for Kagenobu all over Japan to inform him that his sensei, Ishiyama, has died. Before succumbing to his bout with pneumonia, Ishiyama made two requests: the first is that Kagenobu was to be found and asked to return to the school and the second is for Kagenobu to take leadership of the Ishiyama Sword School upon his return. Without hesitation, Kagenobu honors his sensei's last requests and begins the trek back to the sword school along with Kikuchi.

Two months later the two return to the Ishiyama Sword School. Upon his return to his former school, Kagenobu appears before the headstone of the late Ishiyama and bows down before it to honor his sensei when he is greeted by the school's current leader, Daisuke Sasaki, Kagenobu's former classmate who he defeated and scarred during his finally test in order to graduate from the school and become Samurai. After mocking Kagenobu for shedding a tear before his sensei's headstone, Sasaki tries to humiliate Kagenobu by stating his show of emotions is an act of weakness that Ishiyama would reprimand him for doing. However, Kagenobu counters Sasaki's attempt to humiliate him by claiming Ishiyama would not be reprimanding anyone anymore, as would he, leading to Sasaki to face the truth that Kagenobu was now in fact the leader of the school.

Although wanting to respect Ishiyama's wishes while not stepping on Sasaki's toes over leadership of the school, Kagenobu suggests the two go to Ishiyama's former quarters to discuss matters in a calming and peaceful setting. Once within Ishiyama's former quarters, Kagenobu addresses the fact that he Sasaki have always been rivals and makes an assumption that Sasaki's beliefs that he has no right to lead the school due to his three-year absence. With that out of the way, he tells Sasaki of his intentions suggesting that they put their rivalry behind them so they can lead the school together to ensure its future is secured and continuous. Taken aback by his Kagenobu's offer yet concerned that Ishiyama's wishes are not being met, Sasaki is at a loss of words. Assuring Sasaki that Ishiyama held no stipulation about how the school was to be run upon his returned once Sasaki was convince he tells him what he has to offer the students of the school. Having collected a great deal of skills and techniques from his travels across Japan, learning skills and techniques that neither Ishiyama or the school itself could have taught him, Kagenobu offers to share and teach all that he has collected to both Sasaki and their students but the only way this can be done is if Sasaki helps him due to him having earned the respect and trust of the students. Declaring that his role within the school and partnership with Sasaki would be to teach, Kagenobu presents him with the role of leading the school. With their partnership now forged, Kagenobu promises that under their watch the school will survive the loss of their founder and will only thrive with what they have to offer.

After listening to Kagenobu, Sasaki apologetically informs him that expansion is no longer possible since the school can no longer expand but must now limit the number of students they can accept and train due to local ruling Daimyos imposing regulating on all martial arts school during Kagenobu's absence. Enraged by this information, Kagenobu claims the Daimyos have done this because they fear the power the schools hold and are trying to take it away in hopes of crippling the schools in order to remove the lingering protecting and hopeful presence they leave upon Japan. This is a sight he has seen upon his travels, watching corrupt Daimyos who are supposed to govern and protect the people only use their power to protect themselves while being paid off in tea and spice by foreigners who roam freely through the country doing what they want. Kagenobu believes the very identity of the people of Japan is being erased by the imposing foreigners and the people who are supposed to be leading them; no longer wanting to stand by, he proclaims that they now have the power to stop the corrupt Daimyos and foreigner intruders since the power lies within his very hand.

Lifting his hand, Kagenobu orchestrates this power he sees for Sasaki. Like the hand and its five fingers that are independent of each other, Kagenobu compares it to the five islands that make up Japan. While reaching for a wooden cup of tea, he preaches that when the fingers come together for a single purpose they are unified and the hand becomes an unshakable force of power suggesting that if the five joints of Japan were to unify against the common enemy, they could reclaim Japan as one unified force. When Sasaki assumes he is talking about starting a revolution, Kagenobu claims it to be a reclamation which involves the people talking back what is rightfully theirs. Believing that if the two were to find other schools with similar ideas in mind, he believes the other schools would join their cause and form a secret society that would extend all across Japan, and once the moment is right they will strike the government and put the power back into the hands of the people. But before they could begin, Kagenobu believes the students must first be trained.

Three months pass after revealing his plans to Sasaki, after putting them into motion by training the students of the school with all that he knows, Kagenobu and Sasaki returns to the village where he once lived, returning for the very first time since he was taken away from her. The two have traveled to the fishing village in order to pick a target that would begin their plans. Upon their recon of docks, Sasaki suggests attacking a small boat that would be safe enough for their first attack yet big enough to deliver a necessary impact. However, Kagenobu makes another suggestion, suggesting the largest ship docked at the port; seeing the superior ship as a bigger and better target. Later that night, clad in all dark outfits and under the shadows of the night, Kagenobu leads a squadron of students on a raid against the ship. Swiftly disarming and taking out the ship's crew above deck, Kagenobu and the students head below deck and begin a brutal massacre against the crew who are sitting about eating and drinking. As the students savagely dismantle the crew, Kagenobu makes his way for the captain's quarters and swiftly executes him with the throw of his Sai dagger. Once the assault is completed, Kagenobu and the students take their leave of the ship and return to the school.

Back at the school standing before a large red banner with a black mark of a hand residing within its frame, Kagenobu addresses the students congratulating them on the successful raid. He tells them news of the slaughter would spread quickly and bring other to rally behind their cause and makes a declaration that they have fired the very first shot against their corrupted government and the foreigners who plague Japan. Kagenobu tells them their government and the foreigners have received their warning, The Hand has been unleashed upon the world.

=== Chapter Three: Daiichi Insho “The First Impression” ===
Within a room of the Ishiyama Sword School, Kagenobu and Sasaki are entertaining a group of five brutish and intimidating men, leaders of the five rebel groups within Japan. Kagenobu has traveled across Japan looking for like-minded leaders to join in The Hand's efforts cause. After officially welcoming the menacing group of men to their school, Kagenobu announces that the group sitting before him would become the Hand's inner circle. The inner circle has been made up of men who he believes have pledged their knowledge, skills, and resources to the Hand efforts in seeing the destruction of Japan's corrupt government, the removal of foreigners, and the return of power back into the hands of the people.

Explain the meaning behind The Hand and its association and purpose to Japan and its five islands, Kagenobu refines his symbolism by stating that each man operates their own organization within one of the five islands. Each organization acts as a beacon that will spread the word of their action across Japan, this act like a line that trails across a hand connecting each finger to it. As the line extends, Kagenobu believes the word of their actions will continue to grow across Japan and win over new followers to join The Hand's cause. As he says this, Kagenobu places his hand upon a pad of ink and then upon a map of Japan. Upon removing it he leaves behind the black mark of The Hand, showing the men that he intends to unify Japan through the efforts of The Hand.

After giving his speech to the newly conceived inner circle, Kagenobu sits beside Sasaki and join the men for a meal. Noticing something is troubling Sasaki, he asks him what could be bothering him during a time in which they should be celebrating their accomplishments since all of their plans are coming together when Sasaki voices his disapproval of this new alliance he has struck with the inner circle of “heathens” and “heretics”. Scolding Sasaki for insulting the members, Kagenobu explains his purpose for allying The Hand with the men sitting before them believing that like the men in the room, they all share a common goal in bringing back Japan's identity despite each region disagreeing on what the identity should be and wanting to united to reclaim what they have lost. No longer wanting to discuss his decision before the men, Kagenobu offers Sasaki to join him for a drink the next day once the men have gone back to their regions but Sasaki excuses himself and leaves the room while everyone watches him leave in silence.

The next afternoon while meditating in his room, Sasaki enters Kagenobu's room. Bowing down beside Kagenobu, he offers an apology for his disrespectful behavior the previous night. Telling Sasaki to rise, Kagenobu asks him to join him in a drink while he explains his actions which he feels he is owed. Claiming to have no clue what has come over him, Sasaki states that his actions were cause by being caught off-guard by the unexpected appearance of the assorted allies he would have to be host to. Having had time to get over what had stunned him, Sasaki pledges to Kagenobu that he will never question him or his loyalty to the cause and promises to embrace anyone who joins them in removing the foreigners who infect Japan. Upon finishing his pledge of his loyalty, a member of the school enters to inform Kagenobu and Sasaki that a foreigner has approached the gate. Taking Sasaki up on his pledge in removing the foreign infection, the two men leave to greet the foreigner.

As they two exit the school, an old foreign man approaches with a greeting hand when Kagenobu removes his sword and aims it at the foreigner. Startling the man, Kagenobu angrily informs him that foreigners are not permitted and welcome upon their property and demands to know the foolish reason he would risk his life coming to the school in the very first place. With Kagenobu's blade pressed against his neck, the man pleads for him to spare him while trying to state his purpose for seeking the school when someone demands Kagenobu to release him. Turning to face the person behind the order, Kagenobu glances upon a young woman of mixed descent glaring at him.

Taken aback for a brief moment, Kagenobu begins to laugh unexpectedly seemingly amused at the situation. As he quiets down, he throws the man to the ground and watches as the girl screams out “Father!” before running to the side of the old man. Turning away, Kagenobu tells the man that he owes his life to his daughter and the two should leave and never return to the mountain again. As he heads back to the school, the man tries explaining his reasons for coming to the school stating that the villagers told him to seek out the school to help him and his daughter because the school would understand. Kagenobu informs the man that the villagers knows much about the school and especially how much he despises foreigners, by sending directing him to the school they were likely sending him to his death. Looking back, Kagenobu looks at the girl who continues to glare at him with contempt as he tells them to leave once again before he changes his mind in letting them live. The next morning while meditating, Kagenobu is disturbed by a member of the school who informs him that the girl he encountered the day before has returned and is waiting at the gate alone. This intrigues him. Returning to the front gate, Kagenobu sees the girl standing still before the gate and asks if she was stupid not to understand his warning. Instead of listening to him she ignores him and requests to become a student of the school and points out that she will not leave until she is admitted. After mocking her by claiming there would be better uses for her within the school besides educating her, Kagenobu suggests she returns to her father and slams the gate in her face denying her admittance. Instead of leaving, the girl does what she said she would and remains still at the gate throughout the remainder of the day and night.

The following morning, Kagenobu returns to the girl and confesses to be impressed because he sees a great deal of determination within her that he does not see within his very own students. The determination that he professes to see is that motivated by hatred. Kagenobu claims to see it in her eyes and a source of her conviction, he reveals that the girl reminds him of himself when he was boy, so young and very angry. Moving closer into her ear, Kagenobu shocks her when he offers to give her one chance and to return the next day with her father. He is interested in hearing her story.

The next day, Kagenobu and Sasaki host the visiting foreigner and his daughter, her named Eliza Martinez and her father is simply referred to as Martinez. Despite Eliza having no resemblance to him, she is in fact Martinez's daughter with a Japanese woman he had fallen in love with. Arriving in Japan years ago before the influx of merchants, Martinez met and fell in love with Eliza's mother. Soon she was pregnant and once Eliza was born the two eventually married. Rather than having Eliza and her mother accompany him on his travels, Martinez left them to make their home in Japan which found to be a fatal lapse in his judgment. Since marriage and conceiving children of mixed race was something unheard of, Eliza's mother received endless torment and ridicule which eventually led to her murder at the hands of three Ronin samurai who deemed her a traitor to the Japanese race. Eliza was witness to her mother's murder.

After hearing that Eliza's mixed origin and youth is what spared her yet keeps her from finding acceptance, Kagenobu concludes the villagers referred Martinez to him believing he would show pity and accept Eliza into school since both have similar stories. Both have suffered the loss of a mother, became outcast orphans with seemingly no place in the world, and only have their anger and hatred to accompany them. When Martinez tries to explain that he hoped Kagenobu would provide a place of acceptance for her, Eliza interrupts and asks for Kagenobu to teach her how to kill. Fueled by rage and anger, Eliza wants Kagenobu to teach her the necessary skills that would allow her to inflict pain and kill those who have ever hurt her. Seeing how similar the two are, Martinez tries to apologize for Eliza's sudden outburst when Kagenobu proclaims he has heard enough and has come to the decision that Eliza will be allowed into the school, on probationary terms, which blinds and shocks Sasaki. Noticing that he has taken Sasaki by surprise, Kagenobu promises to discuss Eliza's place in the school to him later and suggests they have a drink while discussing Eliza's enrollment. All the while he and Eliza stare at one another.

Later on while honoring Ishiyama at his headstone, Kagenobu is confronted by Sasaki who is outraged and furious that he would taint the school and everything they have accomplished by accepting a foreigner into the school. Sasaki is mortified and incensed by Kagenobu hosting and welcoming foreigners into the school while they tried to cleanse their country of them. Irritated by Sasaki's unyielding attack, Kagenobu explains that his actions are being judge without him knowing his true motivations. Kagenobu explains that by Martinez asking that the school accept Eliza, Martinez is now within their debt and will become a valuable informant who could be used to gain information on activities within the foreigner community. When Sasaki asks about the girl, Kagenobu reveals they will train her, make her feel comfortable and accepted, but once her father is no longer of use to The Hand, he will personally kill them both.

Throughout Kagenobu's training session with Eliza, the events are mirroring his training with Ishiyama and how he trained him to channel his anger. Unlike Ishiyama, Kagenobu trains Eliza to fuel her anger and hatred as a power source to motivate her in her attempts to seek vengeance. The only thing Kagenobu has left untouched by Ishiyama's teaching is that by channeling her anger into strengthening her body and sharpening her mind, she will become a warrior with no equal. By doing so she is honoring the memory of her mother, and ensuring the pain and humiliation she endured was not in vain. Kagenobu also adds fire to her fuel, telling her that by embarking on the path of vengeance she will right the injustices with violence guiding her.

Over the next two years, Kagenobu sees that Eliza has faithfully chosen to commit herself to him and the service of the school. He confesses that she is far more faithful than he had expected something that has taken him by surprise, which has never happened before. Under his tutelage, Kagenobu has noted that Eliza has learned their school's techniques faster than any other student. While the two are sparring, Kagenobu reveals his thoughts on her training and how she has taken him by surprise. As the sparring comes to an end, the two stare at each other deeply. Over the course of him training her, their relationship has grown into something more than sensei and student. When Eliza turns down his offer to go another round believing it is enough for the day, the two turn away from each other and go on with the day.

Later on that night, Kagenobu and Sasaki are discussing the latest information provided to them from Martinez which they have been receiving by getting him into a drunken stupor that leaves him completely vulnerable and open to revealing secrets. Suggesting that it is time for Eliza to be of more use to them, it is time that she proves her use for the cause, Kagenobu abruptly disagrees with Sasaki proclaiming it is far too dangerous for her since she has not yet completed her training. Claiming he only disagrees against sending Eliza out to prove herself because he is playing favorite, Kagenobu tries to prove that Sasaki is wrong by agreeing it is time for Eliza to prove herself just like the others have within the school, exceptions cannot be made. To further discredit Sasaki's belief that he favors Eliza, Kagenobu concludes Eliza will prove her worth, that very night.

Sitting within his room, holding and observing his mother's hairpin, Kagenobu receives a knock on his door, it is Eliza. She is prepared, dressed in armor and ready to depart for the assignment he has tasked her. When Kagenobu acknowledges that she is in fact ready to depart, Eliza senses he is disappointed which he states is only concern. Asking him if he thinks she will fail, Kagenobu reveals his concerns are not over sending a student on a mission and wondering if they would succeed or otherwise. Staring at one another deeply, neither one saying a word, Eliza breaks the silence and turns to leave claiming she must go, pain stricken on her face. As Kagenobu stands alone in his room, clutching his mother's hairpin, he closes his eyes and whispers to himself for Eliza to be strong, knowing what she is about to do.

=== Chapter Four: Saisho No Ayamachi “The First Faults” ===
Sitting before a roaring fire, a foreign merchant sits in his armchair while holding a glass of what appears to be red wine unbeknownst to him that a figure lurks outside a window far off behind him. The figure is a ninja who has managed to break into the merchant's home without being detected. With Sai daggers at the ready, the figure launches them at the man allowing the three-pronged blades to plow through the spine of the chair and exit out through the man's chest disrupting his peaceful night. As his glass of wine shatters upon the floor, the ninja approaches the chair and removes the daggers from the back of the chair.

Taking a hold of the man's hair, the figure pulls his head back to look at his face and is shocked to learn who the man is and mutters his name, “Senior Fernandez...” With his remaining strength, the man lifts his hand and pulls off the mask of the ninja to reveal that it is Eliza Martinez. As he says her name with confusion, perplexed as to why she has committed this action, Eliza pushes down her shock and finishes what she was sent to do. With a swift slash of her Sai dagger, Eliza slits the man's throat killing him and leaves the home from where she once came.

Within the dojo of the Ishiyama Sword School Kagenobu Yoshioka is mediating alone in the dark, or so he wants the person in the shadows to think. Informing the individual that he had heard him enter the dojo, Kagenobu permits the person to step out of the shadows. Step out from the shadowy corners behind him, Eliza steps into a spotlight cast by the moon and becomes illuminated by it. Telling Kagenobu of Fernandez connection to her, telling him that her father and Fernandez were friends, she asks him why she was ordered to kill him. Avoiding the question, Kagenobu instead asks her is she completed her task and if he was dead. Infuriated by him not answering her, Eliza demands for him to tell her why she had to kill him which Kagenobu simply replies that the man was a foreigner.

Completely devastated over taking the life of a man she knew, Eliza demands to know why she had to kill Fernandez whether there was some cause or secret that marked him for death. When Kagenobu does not answer her, Eliza comes to the realization that she simply killed Fernandez because he was not Japanese. Kagenobu replies with a simple, “yes.” Further distraught by this, Kagenobu tries to comfort her by telling her Fernandez was not the first and would not be the last because The Hand will not cease in their effort in removing the foreign plague from Japan. Calming down, Eliza looks at Kagenobu and says “The Hand?” seemingly intrigued by the name. Letting Eliza in on what is and what The Hand does, Kagenobu then does something that would eventually come back to haunt him. He confesses that The Hand would be an organization that he hoped Eliza would one day become a part of.

Brushing his hand across his face, Kagenobu states his curiosity; the fury that drove Eliza to the school and once lingered deep within her was no longer there. Offended by him questioning her, Eliza slaps his hand away while informing him the fury still remains. While Eliza demands to know what would become of her father since he is a foreigner himself, Kagenobu tells her he is protected since he is of value to The Hand since they have been using him as an unwitting spy for all the years they have known the two. Enraged by Kagenobu's betrayal, Eliza slaps him and turns her back on him as he stares at her coldly while rubbing his jaw struck by her blow.

Unable to look at him, Eliza asks him why he has kept all of the information from her and why he chose to reveal everything to her now. Placing his hand upon her shoulder, Kagenobu tells her that despite how much all of it may hurt it was time she learned the truth. Taking her by her hand, he tells her that when she first came to the school he was going to kill her and her father on the very spot they stood but did not because she impressed him. He tells her the two have a lot in common, that the very fury, anger, and pain he saw within her he also felt. He tells her that he knew he was supposed to train her because he had found his kindred spirit, but confesses that he also had ulterior motives that involved the misuse of her father as his spy against the people who defiled his country. He tells her he had her father spy against the very people who refused her as one of them and ridiculed her for being different. He also reminds her he trained her to kill the people she asked him to help her learn how to kill. Moving away from him, Eliza scowls to herself before asking him to forgive her.

Turning to face him with determination in her face, Eliza asks for Kagenobu's forgiveness for her weakness and returning her back to her senses. She lets him know that everything he's said is correct and that despite her mother being murdered by Samurais, it was the foreigners, her father's people, who turned their backs on her and rejected her. This is where her hatred stems from. Making a pledge to Kagenobu promising that since they have all forsaken her, she would return the favor for she will not show them mercy from this day onward. Taking his hand into hers, Eliza moves closer to Kagenobu and confesses that the anger and hatred that she felt is still a part of her and a part that she is anxious to share with him. Upon making her confession the two shares a passionate kiss, while they may think this intimate moment is private they have no idea that Sasaki is watching from the doorway. As he watches the two engaging in the kiss, a sinister smiles crosses his lips.

Several months have pass by since giving into one another and together Kagenobu & Eliza have led the spreading influence of the Hand's fight against the foreigners across Japan. While returning from Nagasaki on an assignment for The Hand, Eliza is walking alone through the woods when she senses something behind her. Turning just in time she is able to remove her katana and deflect an array of throwing stars as she reaches for a sai dagger within her obi belt. Once the threat of the throwing stars is handled she throws the sai dagger and strikes the assailant in his lower abdomen bringing him down from the safety of the trees.

Getting on top of him, Eliza places the blade of her katana to his neck as she ridicules him for being a fool and an amateur assassin for leaving himself open after his attack and should have taken on simpler bounties. But Eliza is stunned to learn the assassin had attacked her on his own accord, hoping to kill her and remove the foreign influence that is sickening The Hand, the assassin is a member of The Hand. Demanding to know why he would attack one of his own kind, the assassin reveals that Eliza's secret is out and she is not one of The Hand due to her being the child of a foreigner. Before killing him with the swing of her sword, she learns that The Hand believes Kagenobu has been weaken and has become soft due to Eliza using her “western wiles” to corrupt him.

A week after encountering the assassin, Eliza finally returns to the Ishiyama Sword School and immediately seeks Kagenobu to inform him what she has just learned. Finding him in a room alone reading a large text, Eliza reveals the betrayal to Kagenobu by presenting him with the cowl the assassin wore, the same cowl worn by other Hand initiatives. Observing the cowl, Kagenobu reveals that the betrayal is something that he feared was imminent. Dumbfounded that he possibly knew that he would be betrayed, Kagenobu tells Eliza that he suspected something was transpiring within The Hand since communications between the factions has been broken off and he had been hearing rumors of opposition. Kagenobu has also heard reports of Hand initiatives selling their skills to the higher bidder, becoming nothing more than weapons for criminals committing crimes against their own people. It appears that the larger The Hand became Kagenobu's control over the organization slipped out of his hands.

Eliza then informs Kagenobu that the assassin knew of her true heritage, of her not being of true Japanese descent and because of this The Hand wants to kill her due to the influence she holds over him. Eliza's revelation identifies the culprit behind this coup, telling her that her background was a well-kept secret that only a few knew of, Kagenobu reveals someone they trusted has betrayed them. Placing his hands upon her face, Kagenobu advises Eliza to go to her father for he too may not be safe. Before leaving, Eliza asks him what he is going to do which Kagenobu simply replies that it is time to bury an old grudge.

Heading out into the area of the Ishiyama Sword School where they dueled years ago, Kagenobu calls out Sasaki's name as he grips his katana. As he comes out from the woods located beside the school, Sasaki informs Kagenobu that with the Hand Fraction leaders coming to the school and the students being sent away it would be a pity that none of them would witness the defeat of the man who betrayed the school and The Hand.

Seeing Sasaki as the betrayer, Kagenobu tells Sasaki that he has suspected his treachery since he returned to the school, that he has never trusted him and has always suspected that he would eventually betray him and has been planning against him because of jealousy over being overlooked as becoming the new leader of the school. Kagenobu reveals to Sasaki that he suspects he went along with his plans for The Hand in order to seize power for himself.

Enraged, Sasaki proclaims his suspicions are nothing more than lies to cover that it was he who betrayed The Hand that day he met Eliza and allowed her into the school, and then into his bed. Sasaki accuses Kagenobu of sleeping with the enemy the two of them had been trying to wipe out of Japan. Feeling that he had no choice in what he had to do since Kagenobu's loyalties were now being questioned, Sasaki felt he had to inform The Hand's inner circle about his traitorous actions before ending Kagenobu for his betrayal. The two engage each other in an intense sword fight. Sasaki's rage is showing as he attacks Kagenobu who manages to keep a still and emotionless stare. As their swords lock and they stare at each other, Kagenobu is able to push himself back and swing his blade at Sasaki. His sword slashes across Sasaki's face reopening the scar he gave him years ago. Allowing his anger to take over, Sasaki raises his sword and roars madly as he charges Kagenobu. Completely open, Kagenobu takes the opportunity and slashes his sword at Sasaki's center instantly bringing him down and ending the fight. Standing over a badly injured Sasaki, who is still alive, Kagenobu pulls out his mother's hairpin and tells Sasaki that a foreigner robbed him of someone he held dear to him and that now his betrayal proves that he is no better than that foreigner. Because of how similar the two are Kagenobu sees that it is only fair he should suffer the same fate and plunges his mother's hairpin into Sasaki, ending his life.

Meanwhile, Eliza has made it to her father's home. As she enters she finds him sitting in the dark. When she approaches, she steps into a pool of his blood and makes the devastating discovery that he is dead. Returning to the school, Eliza finds Kagenobu standing over Sasaki's body and informs him that her father is dead. Telling her that The Hand will not rest until the two of them are dead as well, Kagenobu also tells Eliza that The Hand are standing within the shadows watching and waiting to strike.

As he reaches down to pull the hairpin from Sasaki's neck, Kagenobu tells Eliza that when he was a child his mother told him that there is not any honor in throwing one's life away, but he finds it less honorable in turning and running away from trouble that the person has created. Eliza agrees with Kagenobu but declares the two have each other now and nothing else, except for their revenge. Together they stand back to back, as The Hand strikes.

=== Chapter Five: Saisho No Kizashi “The Last Straw” ===
As the suns begins to set an assembly of The Hand surrounds them, an assembly of members from each fraction of The Hand moves in around Kagenobu and Eliza as they stand besides one another keeping a watchful eye upon the gathering. Wielding his katana and his mother's hairpin within his belt, Kagenobu faces one of the fraction leaders and seat holder of the Inner circle of The Hand as he addresses him. The fraction leader acknowledges that although Kagenobu has successfully guided the Hand since its creation but once he welcomed Eliza-an enemy-within their fold shows that he has betrayed their cause.

Finding him to be hypocrite, Kagenobu accuses all of the sect leaders straying from their cause once they started selling their services as thuggish mercenaries, betraying not only the cause but the identity of the country and the people. Another fraction leader and seat holder steps forward, claiming that although they may offer their services they only offer their services to clients who are of Japanese descendants unlike him who took a foreign tramp under his wing. Enraged by him insulting her, Kagenobu comes to Eliza's defense stating that prior to knowing of her mixed origin all of them embraced her due to her abilities and no matter her background she still shares their goals and carries them forth in the name of The Hand.

Demanding him to stop, Eliza raises her sai dagger and exclaims that she will not have excuses made for her and if she is to be considered an enemy now than so be it and they will all perish by her hands. Finding her exclamation amusing, the fraction leader who referred to Eliza as a foreign tramp is amused that Kagenobu's mutt has found her voice. Before he could finish offering her to show them how she would make them perish, the fraction leader is caught off-guard when Eliza throws a sai dagger that barrels into his forehead instantly killing him.

Looking deeply at her, Kagenobu tells her it is the beginning of the end as another fraction leader roars the order for The Hand to attack. As the battle begins, Kagenobu and Eliza show no mercy as they violently engaged the onslaught of The Hand barreling through their numbers side-by-side while two remaining fraction leaders stand off on the side and watch them fight the horde.

As the fight presses on, a member wielding two swords charges Kagenobu as he engages him deflecting and shielding his attack with his sword one of the fraction leaders who called Kagenobu a betrayer rushes Eliza wielding a chain weapon and sickle. Although she is able to deflect his sickle by crosses her daggers, Eliza leaves herself open allowing the fraction leader to slash her with his bladed chain whip. Distracted by what has happened to her, Kagenobu leaves himself open as his opponent slashes his sword across Kagenobu's chest as he tries to turn and face him. For the very first time, Kagenobu is wounded by an opponent. As he falls to the floor greatly injured, Eliza watches in horror as the fraction leader sneaks up on her.

Before he could take his opening, Eliza turns to catch his chain weapon within the prong of her sai dagger. Falling to the floor, Eliza uses all of her strength she manages to throw him over while taking her other dagger and slashing him across his chest. Disarming her assailant, Eliza rolls onto her side and throws one of her dagger at the duel swordsmen who is standing of Kagenobu. When he deflects it, Eliza grabs the fallen chain whip of her attacker and charges him, avoiding the downward slash of his swords she uses the moment to bind his hands within the chains and tightly lock his wrists with it causing him to lose his grip on the swords. Taking one of the swords, Eliza quickly stabs him before moving slowly over to Kagenobu's side completely exerted. As she heads towards him, she is exposed and defenseless as an array of throwing stars and discs embed her back thrown from the two fraction leaders and a squadron of their members.

Falling besides him, Eliza takes into Kagenobu into her arms as the sun begins to finally depart. While she holds onto him, Kagenobu tells Eliza that he has only loved two women but due to his actions he has doomed both of them. He tells her that his mother's death set everything that has transpired into motion, the path of violence her death set him on began with the first woman he has ever loved sacrifice-he pulls out his mother's hairpin and hands it to her-he only sees that it is fitting that it should end at the hands of the other woman he loves and asks her to kill him. After giving him a final kiss, Eliza says her goodbye to him and promises they will see each other again before killing him with the hairpin.

Taking the sai dagger that rests beside her, Eliza places Kagenobu's lifeless body down on the ground beside her and stands to face the remaining members of The Hand. With tears streaming down her angered face, Eliza exclaims that the Hand has held her for too long and has managed to take everything she's had; her innocence, her father, and Kagenobu himself. But there is one thing she will not allow them to take that she still owns, her life. Taking the sai dagger, Eliza plunges it into her chest. With a weary smile, she falls to the floor ending her life.

As the two fraction leaders look over the bodies of Kagenobu Yoshioka and Eliza Martinez, despite taking her own life believing The Hand will have nothing more to do to her she is greatly wrong when one of the fraction leaders states that she has only done their job and even in death she cannot escape The Hand. The fraction leaders have planned to put Eliza through the process of bringing a fallen member back from the dead, her valiant display within the fight showed them that despite her not being of true Japanese descendant she is an exquisite warrior and once under The Hand's full control, she will become the living weapon they see fit. As the two fraction leaders discuss the process, one of the leaders expresses his concerns that so far the process has had mixed results and has never been performed on a woman. The other fraction does not see the lost if they fail but the gain they would surly acquire if they succeed. Later that night, within a darken cave Eliza lifeless body is upon a dais with several Hand members standing around her as one of the fraction leaders stands before her head. As he commences the ritual, sending the several hand members into decaying dust, Eliza's eyes open. The ritual was a success.

Informing them of what has happened, the fraction leader tells the other members that Eliza remains disorientated due to death still lingering within her but once she fully awakens her hatred for The Hand will be remembered. In order to prevent her from remembering her hatred for them, the leader suggests they break her down and teach her place as their loyal servant. Leaving her alone upon the dais, the two fraction members leave to prepare for the next resurrection. Daisuke Sasaki.

Back within the present, the Hand initiative tells Elektra how the process of the resurrection cycle within The Hand began. Eliza was the very first success of the process itself. Elektra learns that now the process will become her fate, she is not the first, second, third, not even the last who would undergo the process. Believing the Hand has chosen to use its power to resurrect her to control her, the initiative informs her that although they can bring back the dead and can alter their past for their purposes they cannot peer into the future. While showing Elektra her hands, the initiative tells her that while Eliza Martinez's own actions led her on the path which forces her to walk for The Hand, her destiny remains in her own hand.

Smiling at this notion, Elektra turns and looks back at the body. As she does this she begins to fade away as the initiative who just told her the tale of The Hand's origins. Once she has faded away, the deceased Hand member upon the dais begins to move and rises, upon removing the facial garment it is revealed that Elektra has just been resurrected by The Hand. After smiling yet again, Elektra removes the garment that is covering her to reveal she is wearing her white outfit. The white outfit is a sign that she is within a state of clarity and full awareness, she is not under The Hand's control but under her own.

== Collected editions ==
The series has been collected into a trade paperback:

- Elektra: The Hand (120 pages, January 2005, ISBN 0-7851-1594-3)
