= Savage Avengers =

Marvel Comics series

- Cover of Savage Avengers issue #1

Group publication information
- Publisher: Marvel Comics
- First appearance: Savage Avengers #1
- Created by: Gerry Duggan; Mike Deodato Jr.

In-story information
- Type of organization: Team
- Base(s): Savage Land
- Agent(s): Volume 1: Conan the Barbarian; Doctor Voodoo; Daredevil (Elektra Natchios); Punisher; Venom (Eddie Brock); Wolverine (James "Logan" Howlett); Volume 2: Agent Anti-Venom (Flash Thompson); Black Knight (Dane Whitman); Conan the Barbarian; Cloak and Dagger; Deathlok (Miles Morales); Daredevil (Elektra Natchios); Weapon H

Series publication information
- Schedule: Monthly
- Format: Ongoing series
- Genre: Superhero

Creative team
- Writer(s): (vol. 1) Gerry Duggan (vol. 2) David Pepose
- Artist(s): (vol. 1) Mike Deodato Jr. (vol. 2) Carlos Magno
- Letterer(s): Travis Lanham
- Colorist(s): Frank Martin Jr
- Creator(s): Gerry Duggan; Mike Deodato Jr.
- Editor(s): Tom Brevoort, Alanna Smith, Jarad Higgins

Savage Avengers is an American comic book series published by Marvel Comics. The first volume of the series features a team-up between sword and sorcery character Conan the Barbarian and various Marvel superheroes such as Wolverine, the Punisher, Venom, Elektra, and Doctor Voodoo. Written by Gerry Duggan with art by Mike Deodato, a preview of the series first appeared in the May 2019 Free Comic Book Day issue of Marvel's Avengers.

The first volume's plot revolves around Conan the Barbarian teaming up with modern-day superheroes to take down the Hand, who have teamed up with ancient sorcerer Kulan Gath to summon a mysterious, powerful entity known as the Marrow God.

A second volume later debuted in July 2022, written by David Pepose with art by Carlos Magno. This volume features a new team consisting of Conan, Agent Anti-Venom, Black Knight, Cloak and Dagger, Elektra, and Weapon H. The team is transported to the Hyborian Age, where they work to defeat Gath for good. Issues four, six, and nine of the series' run were dedicated in memory of George Pérez, Mike Pasciullo, and Carlos Pacheco, respectively.

== Fictional team biography ==
=== Prologue ===
Savage Avengers #0 reprints the plot of Uncanny X-Men #190 and #191, originally written by Chris Claremont and illustrated by John Romita Jr.

Kulan Gath, a sorcerer from Conan's Hyborian Age, appears in modern-day Manhattan and surrounds it with a magical barrier, which begins transforming New York into a Hyborian kingdom and its denizens into barbaric versions of themselves. After a large-scale conflict with various heroes that spans both issues, Doctor Strange determines the best course of action to be to return to the past, preventing Gath from taking power in the first place. The heroes, affected by changes to the timeline, largely forget about the adventure.

In new material presented in Issue #0 that bookends the reprinted issues, Doctor Strange awakens in the present day on the beaches of Krakoa, where he is confronted by Cable, who warns him humans aren't welcome on the mutant-only island. Strange begins to seek out Magik to aid him in a new plight.

=== Volume 1 ===
The series begins after the events of Avengers: No Road Home, in which a time-displaced Conan assisted the Avengers in battling Nyx, Goddess of Night.

Finding himself transported to the Savage Land, the barbarian infiltrates a temple known as the City of Sickles and begins fighting ninjas of the Hand, attracting the attention of Wolverine. After a brief skirmish, they set aside their differences to discuss their goals in the Savage Land: Conan seeks treasure in the form of a mystical amulet, while Wolverine is searching for a friend who was taken captive by cultists and brought to the City of Sickles.

Exploring the mysterious city further, Conan finds a sleeping Kulan Gath, who bears the third Eye of Agamotto. Elsewhere, a captured Doctor Voodoo is brought to the City of Sickles' cult leader, who reveals the cult's ultimate plan: to sacrifice the blood of warriors to bring forth a deity of death, the Marrow God Jhoatun Lau. Wolverine arrives too late to stop the sacrifice, and Voodoo's throat is slit by the Sickle Priest. Defeated by an overwhelming number of Hand ninja, Wolverine is captured and prepared by the cult to serve as the next sacrifice.

Several coffins are delivered to the complex, prompting Wolverine to ask why the cult needs corpses. The Sickle Priest elaborates further on the group's plan to acquire the blood of warriors, hoping to draw the Punisher into the conflict by exhuming the corpses of his family.

A World War II-era flashback reveals the backstory of the Sickle Priest, formerly known as Luftwaffe pilot Johann Richter, an acolyte of the Red Skull. Shot down over the Savage Land, Richter fights his way through the treacherous terrain and finds Kulan Gath, who grants him power in exchange for his servitude.

In the present day, Wolverine breaks free of his captors as the Sickle Priest teleports away to safety. Apologizing to the now-dead Doctor Voodoo, Logan performs a crude blood transfusion and attempts to resuscitate the dead hero, who awakens as more Hand operatives arrive. In Gath's quarters, Conan attempts to retrieve the Eye of Agamotto, but fails when Gath awakens. Recognizing Conan from previous encounters, Gath announces his intent to sacrifice the barbarian as part of the cult's plan to summon Jhoatun Lau, but is distracted when Conan hurls a jar containing an imprisoned symbiote at the sorcerer, escaping with the amulet in hand as a nearby Venom is drawn by the noise of the symbiote battling Gath.

The Sickle Priest reconvenes with Kulan Gath and the two discuss a solution to overcoming Wolverine's healing factor to make him a suitable sacrifice, unaware that a nearby Conan is eavesdropping on the conversation. In another part of the temple, the Punisher opens fire on more members of the Hand, enraged by the theft of his family's bodies. A disguised Elektra Natchios reveals herself to Castle, and the two head deeper into the temple, finding evidence of Wolverine's presence. Elektra separates from Punisher to free Wolverine, returning as Gath offers to use necromancy to revive Castle's dead family members in exchange for the return of his amulet. Wolverine attempts to bluff Gath by claiming the amulet had been destroyed, but Conan ruins the plan by returning with the amulet. Fatally impaling Conan, Gath retakes the amulet and begins the ritual as the formerly-imprisoned symbiote bonds with Conan, healing his wounds and imbuing his sword with more power. Enraged, Conan begins slaughtering more Hand members, accidentally triggering the final sacrifices needed to summon the Marrow God in the process.

The assembled heroes attempt to kill the eldritch being, but their weapons seem to have no effect, with Wolverine becoming trapped in the creature's body. Opening a portal to Shanghai, Kulan Gath and Jhoatun Lau disappear through it, unknowingly taking Conan with them. Back in the Savage Land, the Punisher calls out to the corpses of his family, who have been possessed by the demonic Xholtan Skin-Walkers. Saving Castle from his possessed family members, Doctor Voodoo explains that the skin-walkers magically bind those who speak to them, necessitating the temporary removal of Castle's mouth via magic. Recovering from the ordeal, Castle joins Elektra and Voodoo in Shanghai, where Jhoatun Lau has grown in size. Venom, who has been transformed into a symbiote dragon after being in proximity to the Marrow God, attacks as Wolverine frees himself from the creature's stomach.

Conan uses his sword's newfound symbiotic power to kill the still-growing god, aided by Elektra, Venom and Wolverine. Victorious against the creature, the symbiote seemingly dies, weakened by healing Conan's continuous wounds throughout the battle.

=== Volume 2 ===
Conan breaks into a Cult of Set while Agent Anti-Venom and Elektra find out about the madbomb that the Set cultists planned to unleash. The battle is crashed by a member of the Deathlok army who plans to erase Conan for crimes against the timestream. A man tries to mug Clayton Cortez only to find out the hard way that is Weapon H. Black Knight was in a nearby bar until he head to leave to break up the fight. After beating up some villains, Cloak and Dagger soon find themselves drawn to the fight between Conan and Deathlok alongside Agent Anti-Venom, Black Knight, Elektra, and Weapon H. Deathlok gives them a hard time until Conan strikes Deathlok's arm the same time the madbomb was activated. The injured Deathlok then opens a time portal as everyone is sucked in. Being dropped in a snowy location, Conan tells Agent Anti-Venom and Dagger that they are in the Hyborian Age.

Conan, Agent Anti-Venom, and Dagger find themselves in the middle of the Rabirian and Zingaran conflict. He finds out that there is a bounty on him. Elektra and Cloak find themselves in an area fighting opponents and the Hyborian version of Devil Dinosaur. Cloak was able to teleport it away as more opponents descend on them. Deathlok makes his way out of the ocean and gets directed to a blacksmith where he fixes his gun. At a fortress, a group of mercenaries and swashbucklers are honoring Kal-Urr the Cutthroat when it gets crashed by Black Knight and Clayton Cortez. After a brief fight, both men escape where Clayton changes his gamma frequency to assume another Weapon H form that evokes the traits of Red Hulk and Betty Ross's Red Harpy form as he flies Black Knight away. Conan, Agent Anti-Venom, and Dagger find themselves locked up in the dungeon. As Cloak and Elektra are thrown in the same cell, Deathlok arrives to attack Conan and those with him. In the nick of time, Black Knight and Weapon H (who returns to his normal Weapon H form) show up to help fight Deathlok as Cloak summons the Hyborian Devil Dinosaur. Conan's group gets away as a plan to get back to the present is made known. Word on Conan's return is made known as some cultists use their magic to summon Thulsa Doom so that they can use Conan's blood to issue in a new age of Set.

As Conan's group arrives at the Temple of the Beast, Deathlok catches up to them as Elektra has planned. Conan's group fights Deathlok until Black Knight uses Deathlok's technology to summon a laser sword. Weapon H then siphons Deathlok's gamma battery to briefly assume a Red Hulk form. Conan's group manages to subdue Deathlok as Elektra uses her Hand tricks on Deathlok. This is crashed by Thulsa and his minions who saw Elektra's "necromancy" at work. As Conan fights Thulsa, the others fight Thulsa's minions as Elektra is confronted by the Beast of the Hand. Deathlok suddenly emits energy as he tells something to get out of his head. Conan's group finds that Thulsa's group managed to make off with Conan. At the edge of a river, Deathlok looks at his reflection in the water as it is revealed that he is an aged version of Miles Morales.

The aged version of Miles Morales recalls some of his past life before he was turned into a Deathlok by a mysterious person who wants him to hunt Conan. Then his Deathlok protocols start reinstalling. Conan is shown strapped to an X as Thulsa Doom plans to use Conan's blood to bring about the rebirth of Set. Agent Anti-Venom, Black Knight, Cloak and Dagger, Elektra, and Weapon H are trying to find where Thulsa took Conan. As Elektra advises Weapon H to save his strength for when they find Thulsa, Dagger keeps Anti-Venom and Cloak from fighting over her. Deathlok recaps to when he opened a prototype portal that the late Doctor Octopus had created and entered it where he fought some insect-like creatures that are part of the Annihilation Wave as the Deathlok protocols are restored. Thulsa makes the final preparations to summon Set. In the nick of time, Conan's group shows up with an army of zombified Cimmerians. They fight against Thulsa's cult as Weapon H assumes a Leader-like appearance. Back in Deathlok's flashback, it was shown that Miles was brought before Annihilus as he breaks free and makes off with Annihilus' Cosmic Control Rod. This flashback disrupts the Deathlok re-installation protocols. Thulsa starts heading towards Conan and slits his throat with his sword in order to gain his blood which he uses to summon Set. Deathlok tells his computer that it's "time to put my game face on".

As Set starts to go on a rampage, Conan's group confronts Thulsa Doom for what he did to Conan. Deathlok shows up to help them fight Set and Thulsa to save the timestream. He starts by using his gamma battery to have Weapon H assume a Leader/Red Hulk/Harpy-like appearance. After saving Dagger, Agent Anti-Venom assumes a Symbiote Dragon-like form. Black Knight obtains the ceremonial blade as he becomes Bloodwraith while Dagger uses her light abilities to heal and revive Conan. As Thulsa outmatches Deathlok, Conan fights Thulsa as Elektra tells Black Knight that he is nobody's weapon. Deathlok provides the distraction that Conan needed to kill Thulsa. With Thulsa dead, all that was left was to deal with Set. Conan states that only the blood of twice-returned men can open the portal to send Set back where he belongs. Conan does that while Deathlok brings Anti-Venom, Black Knight, Cloak and Dagger, and Elektra back to their own time. No matter what legacy Conan left behind, he would know that he was an Avenger and his legacy would live forever. Once everyone is back in the present, Weapon H states that he cannot change back to his human form while Agent Anti-Venom, Black Knight, and Dagger find that there's something wrong with this place. They discover that they are actually in year 2099 and are confronted by Jake Gallows who wants to know who they are.

In 2022, two scientist enter a room where an artifact was found. In 2099, the Savage Avengers are fleeing from Jake Gallows as Deathlok states to Elektra that his temporal circuits are depleted. As the Savage Avengers are teleported away by Cloak, Jake Gallows suspects that they might have something to do with a Deathlok. A mysterious figure is told about the Savage Avengers as it knows them. As Weapon H holds Deathlok accountable and asks him if he knows what year it is, the A.I. Lyla activates and states that they are 2099 and even brings up Jake Gallows while mentioning that he is the Punisher of this period. Agent Anti-Venom states that this Punisher is much crazier than the Punisher they know. The Savage Avengers make their way to the ruins of Avengers Mansion where they are attacked by Deathloks who work for the Prime Deathlok. Deathlok claims that they broke the timestream. Jake Gallows shows up and notes that the Deathlok with the Savage Avengers is not with the Prime Deathlok. As Jake Gallows and Deathlok fight the Deathloks, the Savage Avengers make their way into Avengers Mansion where they make use of its equipment. Elektra wields Archangel's wings, Black Knight finds himself wielding the Ebony Blade while riding a hoverbike, Cloak wields Doctor Octopus' tentacles, Agent Anti-Venom rides the Spider-Mobile, Dagger wields Doctor Spectrum's Power Prism, and Weapon H wields Absorbing Man's wrecking ball. The attacking Deathloks fell to Jake Gallows and the Savage Avengers. Prime Deathlok is shown to be a form of Ultron.

When the Corporate Wars began in 2067, Alchemax successfully reverse-engineered the Deathlok technology. Tyler Stone revealed to the press Formula-D, a nanotech solution that would convert human corpses into Deathloks. He dispatched these Deathloks against his financial competition. Alchemax's rivals at Stark-Fujikara desperately pursued alternative lines of research which would prove to be their fatal mistake when Ultron was reactivated. By 2099, the Deathloks have assimilated over 75% of the human population into their ranks. The Deathloks carved the future into their own image. As Ultron became Deathlok Prime, he managed to subdue the Public Eye who were used as a diversion so that Jake Gallows and the Savage Avengers can make their move. The Scourge of the Digital World named Fever calculates the Fever Protocols to be 99/87%. The Savage Avengers fight their way passed the Deathloks while Jake Gallows hacked into Fever's program using a program that can be classified as digital napalm. The Savage Avengers make their way to the central node. Deathlok Prime orders the Deathloks to bring the Savage Avengers to him as he also quotes "There's no room for Avengers in 2099". At Valhalla, Black Knight works on decrypting Ultron's files in order to find some software that can send them back to their own time. He finds that time-travel technology doesn't exist in 2099 due to the fact that the Baxter Building, Stark Unlimited, and the Sanctum Sanctorum are gone while also finding that Alchemax unearthed the Deathlok technology in 2022. Deathlok notes that this was because of when he lost his arm fighting the Savage Avengers back in 2022. Elektra breaks up the fight between Deathlok and Jake Gallows as she finds some names in the archives. At the heavily guarded Hellrock Prison for dissidents of Ultron's rule and has electrostatic generators that negates teleportation, it is ruled by a Deathlok version of MODOK called D.E.A.T.H.D.O.K. (short for Digitally Enhanced Autonomous Telepathic Host Designed Only for Killing). Cloak, Elektra, and Jake Gallows infiltrate Hellrock Prison with help from Deathlok and a stolen authentication code while the others provide a diversion. Deathlok's anger gives them away as D.E.A.T.H.D.O.K. is alerted of the situation as he is attacked by an invisible Dagger, Agent Anti-Venom, and Weapon H's Abomination form. Cloak, Deathlok, Elektra, and Jake Gallows are then attacked by Jigsaw 2099 who is a cyborg monstrosity. Dagger leaves D.E.A.T.H.D.O.K. for Agent Anti-Venom and Weapon H to deal with. Jigsaw 2099 proves to be a match for Deathlok and Black Knight. Cloak summons Jake Gallows' vehicles to deal with the attacking Deathloks. D.E.A.T.H.D.O.K. catches up to them while having entangled Agent Anti-Venom and Weapon H in his tentacles. Deathlok takes down D.E.A.T.H.D.O.K. since part of him is synthetic. Cloak reaches the area where the 2099 version of Doctor Doom is imprisoned and makes a deal with him to become an Avenger. Doom 2099 accepts if it will mean that he'll take his revenge on Ultron.

Doom 2099 recalls the day when Ultron and the Deathloks raided his castle in 2091 and took him prisoner. In the present, Doom 2099 is with the Savage Avengers and Jake Gallows as they flee in their Quinjet. Doom 2099 states that they have to obtain the Time-Array Gauntlet that brought him to 2099 if they are ever going to defeat Ultron while Deathlok takes out his old web shooters. A Deathlok attacks the Quinjet as Doom Supreme teleports off the Quinjet. The crash knocks out Cloak as the Savage Avengers are attacked by the Deathloks. Doom 2099 returns and attacks some of the Deathloks as Deathlok pulls Jake Gallows out of the rubble. Then they are attacked by an Ultimo who states that they are trespassing in Latveria. When Ultimo is subdued, Doom 2099 takes them to the abandoned fortress of Tiger Wylde as he states that he left the Time-Array Gauntlet here for safekeeping. As Doom 2099 interfaces with the fortress' network, too much neural feedback knocks him down. This is because Ultron had arrived first after underestimating Doom 2099 once and he now has possession of the Time-Array Gauntlet. Elektra tells Jake to protect Deathlok as she goes on the offensive against Ultron as he impales her. Jake Gallows and Deathlok go on the attack and knocks them down. Weapon H and Agent Anti-Venom go on the attack as Ultron reduces Agent Anti-Venom to a skeleton and Weapon H to a gray puddle which leaves Dagger devastated. As Ultron throws something at Dagger, Cloak takes the hit. With the Darkforce unleashed, Dagger merges with the Anti-Venom symbiote as it becomes a conduit for Dagger's incandescent fury. Tapping into an Alchemax Tactical Satellite, Ultron attacks Dagger. Black Knight then goes on the attack with Bloodwraith only for Ultron to kills him. As Jake Gallows and Ultron get to their feet and flee, Ultron retreats to his factory where he has it experimenting on the fallen Savage Avengers members where he turns them into Deathloks to further the Machine Empire's goals.

After a flashback to Jake Gallows' past, he and Deathlok arrive at a location where they are attacked by Deathlok versions of the Savage Avengers. Ultron orders the Deathlok Savage Avengers to dismember them. Deathlok and Jake Gallows struggle against them until Doom 2099 arrives. He tells Deathlok and Jake Gallows to retrieve his time gauntlet while he deals with the Deathlok Savage Avengers. Doom 2099 proceeded to tear through the Deathlok Savage Avengers like a knife until Deathlok Black Knight used a device to tap into the vibrational frequency of Doom 2099's armor. Order Jake Gallows to keep his body safe, Deathlok enters cyber-space to reason with the Deathlok Savage Avengers as each one claims that they deserved this fate. Jake Gallows kills several Deathloks while recalling more of his earlier fights with them 10 years earlier. As he places Deathlok's body in a safe location, Jake Gallows charges towards the Deathloks with two active grenades in his hands as he sacrifices his life to take them down. As Deathlok gets through to the Deathlok Savage Avengers, he gets disconnected when Ultron arrives. In the nick of time, the Deathlok Savage Avengers fight their programming and arrive where they connect to the Vats of Formula-D as they control the nanobots inside to restore their bodies back to the way they were before they were converted into Deathloks. Elektra states "If you think you're going to rule the timestream, you'll have to go through us first".

As Ultron strangles Deathlok, the Savage Avengers save him as they and Doom 2099 fight the Deathloks with Weapon H stating that he can finally regain his human form again. Ultron has Doom 2099 attacked by a Deathlok version of Jake Gallows. To combat the Deathloks, Elektra heads to the southwest holding cells where she frees the prisoners there who make up the Savage Avengers 2099. Black Knight brings Ultron into cyberspace where his programming can be rewritten as he strikes Ultron. As Deathlok Jake Gallows tries to eliminate Doom 2099, he starts to suffer from the memories of ten years ago upon Deathlok getting through to him. As Deathlok Jake Gallows attacks the time gauntlet, Ultron proceeds to attack Deathlok as the time portal starts to close. Deathlok uses his web shooters to obtain one of the Deathlok arms which he uses to erase Ultron as the timestream buckled and crashed into reality like a wave. The Savage Avengers return to their own time as they note that Deathlok was at the center of the temporal shockwave. Deathlok then arrives in the lair of Uatu the Watcher (who was narrating this story) as he identifies Deathlok as Miles Morales of Earth-807128. While Uatu congratulates Deathlok for his heroic actions and states that there are others who need him more than Uatu, Deathlok finds himself regressing back to his human form and is returned to his homeworld to enjoy his reward. Miles is reunited with his loved ones. Back in 2099, Jacob Gallows is alive and human again as Uatu narrates that Jacob Gallows ensured that Ultron's future never came to pass by burying Ultron's head in a graveyard to make sure that Alchemax or Stark-Fujikawa doesn't bring him back online. In the present, the Savage Avengers prepare themselves when Fin Fang Foom goes on the attack. When Elektra asks Weapon H as they should be together one last time, Weapon H states "Ah, what the hell. We're Avengers now, right? Then lets prove it"!

== Members ==
=== First Savage Avengers ===
Character	Real Name	Joined in	Notes
Wolverine	James "Logan" Howlett	Savage Avengers Vol. 1 #1 (May 2019)	Current member of the Savage Avengers and the X-Men. Former member of the main Avengers team, Avengers Unity Squad, and the New Avengers. Maintained simultaneous membership in the Avengers and the X-Men.
Punisher	Francis "Frank Castle" Castiglione	Savage Avengers Vol. 1 #1 (May 2019)	Current member of the Savage Avengers. Former member of Code Red, Thunderbolts, and Heroes for Hire.
Elektra	Elektra Natchios	Savage Avengers Vol. 1 #1 (May 2019)	Current member of the Savage Avengers. Former member of Code Red, Thunderbolts, The Hand, and The Chaste.
Conan the Barbarian	Conan	Savage Avengers Vol. 1 #1 (May 2019)	Current member of the Savage Avengers.
Doctor Voodoo	Jericho Drumm	Savage Avengers Vol. 1 #1 (May 2019)	Current member of the Savage Avengers. Former member of the Avengers Unity Squad and the Midnight Sons.
Venom	Edward "Eddie" Brock	Savage Avengers Vol. 1 #1 (May 2019)	Current member of the Savage Avengers. Former member of the Sinister Six, Savage Six, and the Venom-Army.

=== Second Savage Avengers ===
Character	Real Name	Joined in	Notes
Agent Anti-Venom	Flash Thompson	Savage Avengers Vol. 2 #1 (May 2022)	Current member of the Savage Avengers. Former member of the Secret Avengers, Thunderbolts, Guardians of the Galaxy, New Warriors and S.H.I.E.L.D.
Black Knight	Dane Whitman	Savage Avengers Vol. 2 #1 (May 2022)	Current member of the Savage Avengers. Former member of The Avengers, The Defenders, Euroforce, Excalibur, Heroes for Hire, Masters of Evil, MI-13, New Avalon, and Ultraforce.
Conan the Barbarian	Conan	Savage Avengers Vol. 2 #1 (May 2022)	Current member of the Savage Avengers.
Cloak and Dagger	Tyrone "Ty" Johnson and Tandy Bowen	Savage Avengers Vol. 2 #1 (May 2022)	Current members of the Savage Avengers. Formers members of X-Men, Dark X-Men, Secret Avengers, Runaways, New Warriors (Dagger), Secret Defenders (Dagger), Marvel Knights (Dagger), Seven Brides of Set (Dagger), and The Assembly of Evil.
Deathlok	Miles Morales	Savage Avengers Vol. 2 #1 (May 2022)	An alternate universe version of Miles Morales that is currently hunting Conan.
Daredevil	Elektra Natchios	Savage Avengers Vol. 2 #1 (May 2022)	Current member of the Savage Avengers. Former member of Code Red, Thunderbolts, The Hand, and The Chaste.
Weapon H	Clayton Cortez	Savage Avengers Vol. 2 #1 (May 2022)	Current member of the Savage Avengers. Former member of Eaglestar, Roxxon Energy Corporation, the Weapon X Project, and the War Avengers.

== Collected editions ==
Title	Material collected	Published date	ISBN
Savage Avengers Vol. 1: City of Sickles	Savage Avengers #1–5 and material from Free Comic Book Day 2019 (Avengers)	November 26, 2019	978-1302916657
Savage Avengers Vol. 2: To Dine With Doom	Savage Avengers #6–10 and Savage Avengers Annual #1	August 18, 2020	978-1302916664
Savage Avengers Vol. 3: Enter the Dragon	Savage Avengers #11–16	March 16, 2021	978-1302921873
Savage Avengers Vol. 4: King in Black	Savage Avengers #17–22	September 21, 2021	978-1302926298
Savage Avengers Vol. 5: The Defilement of All Things by the Cannibal-Sorcerer Kulan Gath	Savage Avengers #23–28	March 8, 2022	978-1302926304
Savage Avengers by Gerry Duggan Omnibus	Savage Avengers #0–28, Savage Avengers Annual #1 and material from Free Comic Book Day 2019 (Avengers)	November 2, 2022	978-1302947842
Savage Avengers Vol. 1: Time Is the Sharpest Edge	Savage Avengers (vol. 2) #1–5	November 15, 2022	978-1302945381
Savage Avengers Vol. 2: Escape From Nueva York	Savage Avengers (vol. 2) #6–10	May 9, 2023	978-1302945398
