= Kulan Gath =

Publication information
- Publisher: Marvel Comics; Dynamite Entertainment
- First appearance: Conan the Barbarian #14-15 (February/March 1972)
- Created by: Roy Thomas; Barry Windsor-Smith

In-story information
- Alter ego: Kulan Gath
- Abilities: Reality alteration Immortality

Kulan Gath is a fictional villainous magician appearing in American comic books published by Marvel Comics and Dynamite Entertainment. The character first appeared in Conan the Barbarian #15 (May 1972) as a foe of Conan.

He was later fully integrated into the Marvel Universe, and he became popular for his appearances in X-Men and Savage Avengers. In 2006, he was also used by Dynamite Entertainment when they secured the rights to Red Sonja, including in Spider-Man/Red Sonja.

== Fictional character biography ==
=== Conan era ===
Kulan Gath is a sorcerer originating in the Hyborian Era, the ancient time period in which Conan the Barbarian lived. In Gath's first appearance, he seeks the power of the Melnibonéan sorceress Terhali, who had been exiled to Earth and placed in suspended animation. When Terhali awakens, she disintegrates Gath with a magical bolt of energy. However, Gath has achieved effective immortality by placing his life energy into a magical amulet and eventually regains his body.

=== Modern day ===
Millennia later, Kulan Gath returns to life in the modern world when the amulet that houses his essence turns up at a museum display in New York City. He uses the amulet as a conduit to possess a night watchman working at the museum. Gath is defeated by Red Sonja, who had been temporarily reincarnated in the present day in the body of Mary Jane Watson, and her newfound ally Spider-Man. Spider-Man discards the amulet, which is found by a mugger.

Gath transforms Manhattan into a likeness of his native time. He takes control of the Avengers, the X-Men, the New Mutants, and the Morlocks, who hunt down Spider-Man. After Spider-Man is killed, Doctor Strange and Magik use their powers to change the timeline. In this timeline, the mugger is killed by Nimrod, preventing Gath from possessing him.

Gath travels to Costa Verde and attempts to transform it as he did Manhattan. The Avengers, accompanied by Silverclaw, travel to Costa Verde to stop Gath, who attempts to sacrifice Silverclaw's mother Pelali to his demonic gods. Pelali is freed, but dies from the effects of the ritual. The gods take Gath hostage in place of a sacrifice.

Gath returns to Earth when his amulet comes into contact with a corrupt senator, providing him with a new body that he subsequently uses to transform New York City once again. Red Sonja destroys the amulet and breaks Gath's spell, thus restoring the world to normal.

== Other versions ==
=== Exiles ===
In Exiles, the Exiles visit an alternative universe where Zarathos obtained Kulan Gath's amulet after Gath's takeover of Manhattan. After falling victim to Gath's spell, the Exiles are freed by Illyana Rasputin and Spider-Man. Heather Hudson kills Gath, leaving Selene to undo the spell.

=== Paradise X ===
An alternate universe of Kulan Gath appears in Paradise X, where he extends his magic to all of Earth and turns humanity into a barbarian army under his control. Shortly after Gath executes Mister Fantastic, he is confronted and killed by alternate universe versions of X-51 and Hyperion, who intend to warn the people of that reality of the Celestial seed in Earth's core.

=== Legenderry ===
In Legenderry, a Steampunk reality with versions of many Dynamite properties, Kulan Gath is an enemy of that setting's version of Red Sonja, and a member of a cult that seeks to control The City.

== Reception ==
Screen Rant reviewer Bryce Morris characterized Kulan Gath as a famed villain from the Conan the Barbarian series, as well as "one of the most powerful" and the "darkest sorcerer" in the world of Marvel Comics. Despite this, Morris judged that Kulan Gath "has not been a major player in the comics over the years" and has rarely received the same spotlight as other infamous magic users.

Morris' colleague Thomas Bacon labelled the character "the darkest Sorcerer Supreme" from the Marvel Comics, "a classic villain" and "a formidable foe" to other powerful players in their fictional universe. Bacon judged Kulan Gath's origin story "horrific, but loses a little of its shock value" because due to a lapse in the publication schedule some information on it was already disseminated beforehand.

Comic book author Amy Chu stated in KISS in 2017 that in her view "Kulan Gath has been pretty much treated as a very one dimensional villain", focussing on his trait of megalomania. While she found "that's kind of fun", she planned to "develop him as a more complex character" with more differentiated goals in her run of Red Sonja.

James Lowder commented critically about the use of the character in Uncanny X-Men #190–191: "As a spectacle, the Kulan Gath story worked well enough", with the evil wizard causing "blood-letting sadistic enough to sate fans of Grand Guignol-style entertainment". But Kulan Gath's strikingly depicted torture and murder of Spider-Man and other characters in which readers were deeply invested, combined with the "cheat ending", where the sorcerer was defeated and all events erased by resetting the timeline, produced in Lowder's view a "profoundly unrewarding" tale.
