= Elektra (2005 film) =

Superhero film by Rob Bowman

- Theatrical release poster
- Directed by: Rob Bowman
- Written by: Zak Penn; Stuart Zicherman; M. Raven Metzner
- Based on: Comic book characters by; Frank Miller; Motion picture characters by Mark Steven Johnson
- Produced by: Arnon Milchan; Gary Foster; Avi Arad
- Starring: Jennifer Garner; Goran Višnjić; Will Yun Lee; Cary-Hiroyuki Tagawa; Terence Stamp
- Cinematography: Bill Roe
- Edited by: Kevin Stitt
- Music by: Christophe Beck
- Production companies: Regency Enterprises; Marvel Enterprises; New Regency Productions; Horseshoe Bay Productions
- Distributed by: 20th Century Studios
- Release date: January 14, 2005
- Running time: 97 minutes
- Countries: Canada; United States
- Language: English
- Budget: $43–65 million
- Box office: $57 million

Elektra is a 2005 superhero film based on the Marvel Comics character Elektra Natchios and directed by Rob Bowman. It is a spin-off from the film Daredevil (2003), with Jennifer Garner reprising her role as the titular character. The story follows Elektra, an assassin who must protect a man and his prodigy daughter from another assassin who was hired by the Hand. Goran Višnjić, Will Yun Lee, Cary-Hiroyuki Tagawa, and Terence Stamp also star.

For the screenplay, Zak Penn, Stuart Zicherman, and M. Raven Metzner received "written by" credit. Mark Steven Johnson received credit for "motion picture characters" and Frank Miller for "comic book characters". Filming began in Vancouver in May 2004.

The film was released on January 14, 2005. Elektra was a commercial and critical failure, grossing $57 million against a production budget of $43–65 million. It received negative reviews from critics, who found the script and storyline lacking, but many praised Garner's performance. Garner reprised her role as Elektra in the 2024 film Deadpool & Wolverine.

== Plot ==
After being killed, (Note: As depicted in Daredevil) Elektra Natchios is revived by blind martial arts master Stick. He teaches her the ancient art of Kimagure, which provides its practitioners with precognition as well as the ability to resurrect the dead. Elektra is expelled from the training compound because of her inability to let go of her rage and fear of seeing her mother's killer as a child. She leaves and uses her training to become a contract killer.

Years later, Elektra's agent McCabe receives an unusually large offer from an anonymous client wishing to hire Elektra. The only stipulation: she must spend a few days in a rented home on the island where the assassination is to be performed before the names of the targets are revealed. During the wait, Elektra catches a girl named Abby trying to steal her mother's necklace.

Elektra sends Abby away, and later meets and befriends her father, Mark Miller. She gets invited to Christmas dinner with Abby and Mark. Elektra develops a romantic interest in Mark but learns that he and Abby are the targets she has been hired to kill. She spares them and leaves, but returns in time to protect them from assassins sent by The Hand, a crime syndicate of ninja mercenaries.

Roshi, master of The Hand, learns of the failed attempt so permits his son Kirigi to lead a new team of assassins to kill Elektra and return with Abby, referred to as "The Treasure". Elektra tries to leave Abby and Mark with Stick, but he scolds her and tells her to protect them herself. Elektra takes Mark and Abby to McCabe's country house, but is followed by Kirigi, Typhoid, Stone, Kinkou, and Tattoo.

Elektra flees with the pair through a secret underground exit to a forest, while McCabe sacrifices himself to buy them time. Kirigi and the assassins hunt down the trio in the forest. Elektra kills Stone, while Abby and Mark kill Kinkou with one of his own daggers. As Elektra is distracted by the revelation that Abby has martial arts skills, Typhoid gives her the "Kiss of Death".

Abby is captured by Kirigi. Stick and his Chaste ninjas arrive, forcing Kirigi, Typhoid, and Tattoo to retreat. He saves Elektra from death and takes them under his protection. Stick confirms that Abby is the "Treasure", a martial arts prodigy, whom the Hand seeks to use. Elektra learns that she was a Treasure herself, resulting in her mother becoming a casualty of the fight between The Chaste and The Hand.

Elektra correctly guesses that Stick set up the hit on Mark and Abby to test Elektra's propensity for compassion. She then astrally projects herself to a meeting with Kirigi and challenges him to a fight, the winner claiming Abby for their own purpose. She returns to her childhood home to face him and realizes that the horned demon who killed her mother was actually him.

Elektra is defeated by Kirigi. Abby arrives and engages him long enough for Elektra to recover. The two escape and hide in a hedge maze, but Abby is captured by snakes dispatched by Tattoo. Elektra finds Tattoo and snaps his neck, releasing Abby. Elektra engages Kirigi a second time and kills him. Typhoid poisons and kills Abby, before Elektra can kill her with her sai. Elektra desperately tries to wake Abby, calms herself, lets go of all of her rage, and successfully resurrects her using Kimagure.

Elektra prepares to leave and shares one final kiss with Mark. She tells Abby to live a normal life as they each have their lives back. She then leaves, hoping that Abby will not grow up to be like her. Stick appears and points out that Elektra did not turn out so bad. Elektra bows to him to thank him, he bows back and disappears.

== Cast ==
- Jennifer Garner as Elektra Natchios
  - Laura Ward as Young Elektra Natchios
- Kirsten Prout as Abby Miller
- Goran Višnjić as Mark Miller
- Terence Stamp as Stick
- Cary-Hiroyuki Tagawa as Master Roshi
- Will Yun Lee as Kirigi
- Natassia Malthe as Typhoid
- Chris Ackerman as Tattoo
- Bob Sapp as Stone
- Edson T. Ribeiro as Kinkou
- Colin Cunningham as McCabe
- Hiro Kanagawa as Meizumi
- Jana Mitsoula as Elektra's Mother
- Kurt Max Runte as Nikolas Natchios
- Jason Isaacs as DeMarco (uncredited)

Ben Affleck reprised his role as Matt Murdock / Daredevil from Daredevil in a deleted cameo appearance, where he appeared to Natchios in a dream sequence.

== Production ==
In 1987, after the success of Frank Miller's "Elektra: Assassin", Marvel tried to adapt the graphic novel into a live-action movie. After selling the rights of Elektra to New Line Cinema, Frank Miller was hired to pen a screenplay based on the graphic novel of the same name. Later on, screenwriters Jim McBride and L.M. Kit Carson were hired to write a second script. Director Oliver Stone later signed on to direct and wanted volleyball player, model, and actress Gabrielle Reece to star as Elektra. The project was cancelled after the rights to Elektra were sold to 20th Century Fox.

Garner reportedly did not want to do the film and only did it because she was legally required due to contractual obligations from Daredevil. The film was made during Garner's hiatus from the television show Alias, and production was limited by that timeframe. Ben Affleck reprised his role as Matt Murdock / Daredevil in a cameo appearance, but it was cut from the final film. The scene was included on the DVD as a deleted scene.

Director Rob Bowman knew going into the project that the production time was going to be short, and they would be limited in what they could achieve, but he thought that critics would appreciate what he was able to do with the relatively small $43 million budget. Bowman saw it not as an all-action spectacle but as "a story about a character learning about compassion". He said shooting and preparation made for very long days, and as little as four hours sleep a night, and that he used "every trick in the book I had to pull that movie off in that short amount of time." The film was shot primarily in Canada, including near the Cleveland Dam, Vancouver.

Bowman stated that the film was "literally 12 frames of film from an R-rating" due to MPAA objections to several death scenes.

== Music ==
Elektra: The Album

Soundtrack album by Various artists
- Released: January 11, 2005
- Genres: Alternative rock; alternative metal; post-grunge; hard rock
- Label: Wind-up
- Producer: Various producers

Professional ratings
Review scores
Source	Rating
AllMusic	2/5 stars

Elektra: The Album was released in 2005 by Wind-up Records. As with many Wind-up soundtracks, almost none of the songs featured on the album were actually used in the film except for "Sooner or Later", "Wonder", "Photograph", and "Thousand Mile Wish (Elektra Mix)", with the latter three being featured during the end credits. An unreleased Ali Dee remix of Submersed's "Hollow" also appeared in the film, but the song's original version appears on the soundtrack; The album contained several songs by artists on the Wind-Up roster that originally appeared in their respective previous albums, but aside from "Never There (She Stabs)", "Hey Kids", "Sooner or Later", "Photograph", and the original version of "Hollow" all other songs featured were either created specifically for it, or debuted here before being included in the artists' later albums. "Breathe No More" was originally an outtake from Evanescence's debut album Fallen. The score album was released by Varèse Sarabande containing selections of Christophe Beck's original music from the film.

No.	Title	Writer(s)	Producer(s)	Length
1.	"Never There (She Stabs)" (Strata)	Hrag Chanchanian; Eric Victorino; Adrian Robison; Ryan Hernandez	Strata	3:44
2.	"Hey Kids" (Jet)	Chris Cester; Cameron Muncey; Nic Cester	Dave Sardy	2:58
3.	"Everyone is Wrong" (The Donnas)	Brett Anderson; Torry Castellano; Maya Ford; Allison Robertson	Butch Walker	3:28
4.	"Sooner or Later" (Switchfoot)	Jonathan Foreman	Charlie Peacock; John Fields (add.)	4:09
5.	"Thousand Mile Wish (Elektra Mix)" (Finger Eleven)	Scott Anderson; James Black; Sean Anderson; Rich Beddoe; Rick Jackett	Johnny K	4:00
6.	"Wonder" (Megan McCauley)	Marcus Rudloff; Will Baker; Pete Woodruff	Will Baker; Pete Woodruff; Neal Avron (add.)	3:53
7.	"Your Own Disaster" (Taking Back Sunday)	Taking Back Sunday	Lou Giordano	5:42
8.	"Breathe No More" (Evanescence)	Amy Lee	Dave Fortman	3:48
9.	"Photograph" (12 Stones)	Paul McCoy; Eric Weaver; Aaron Gainer; Kevin Dorr; Greg Trammell	Dave Fortman	3:58
10.	"Save Me" (Alter Bridge)	Mark Tremonti	Ben Grosse	3:27
11.	"Beautiful" (The Dreaming)	Christopher Hall; The Dreaming	Jay Baumgardner	3:03
12.	"Hollow" (Submersed)	Donald Carpenter; TJ Davis; Eric Friedman; Kelan Luker	Don Gilmore	4:04
13.	"Angels With Even Filthier Souls" (Hawthorne Heights)	Hawthorne Heights	Hawthorne Heights	2:55
14.	"5 Years" (The Twenty Twos)	Jenny Christmas; The Twenty Twos	Bryce Goggin	3:52
15.	"In the Light" (Full Blown Rose)	Seven Volpone; Walter Brandt; Bill Brandt; Dan Lavery	We 3 Kings; Spider	4:13

== Release ==
=== Home media ===
The DVD of Elektra was released on April 5, 2005. It featured several deleted scenes, including one featuring Ben Affleck reprising his role from Elektra's predecessor, Daredevil (2003). It was released on VHS in May 2005.

=== Director's Cut ===
An extended and slightly refined two-disc unrated director's cut DVD was released in October 2005, featuring a cut detailed for home video release. Unlike the Daredevil director's cut which added about thirty minutes of material not in the original theatrical release, this version only changed about seven minutes of footage, extending the total runtime by just three minutes. It was also criticized for poor video transfer.

A Blu-ray of Elektra was released on October 19, 2009, for release in the United Kingdom and France. The US version was released on May 4, 2010. It contains only the unrated director's cut of the film.

== Reception ==
=== Box office ===
Elektra opened on January 14, 2005, in the United States in 3,204 theatres. In its opening weekend, it ranked fifth, taking $12,804,793. In its second weekend, it took $3,964,598, a drop of 69%. Domestically the total gross was $24,409,722, at the time the lowest for a film featuring a Marvel Comics character since Howard the Duck. The film had a worldwide total of $56,681,566.

=== Critical response ===
The film received largely negative reviews from film critics. On Rotten Tomatoes, the film has an approval rating of 11%, based on 164 reviews with an average rating of 3.8/10. The site's critical consensus reads: "Jennifer Garner inhabits her role with earnest gusto, but Elektra's tone-deaf script is too self-serious and bereft of intelligent dialogue to provide engaging thrills." On Metacritic, the film has a score of 34 out of 100 based on 35 critics, indicating "generally unfavorable" reviews. Audiences surveyed by CinemaScore gave the film a grade "B" on scale of A to F.

Roger Ebert of the Chicago Sun-Times gave the film 1.5 out of 4, and wrote: "Plays like a collision between leftover bits and pieces of Marvel superhero stories. It can't decide what tone to strike." Helen O'Hara at Empire magazine gave the film 2 out of 5 stars, and says "Despite oozing star quality, Garner struggles to rise above the limitations of the script." Brian Lowry of Variety writes: "Elektra proves no more than fitfully satisfying, a character-driven superhero yarn whose flurry of last-minute rewriting shows in a disjointed plot." Claudia Puig of USA Today writes "[Garner's] grace and mystical abilities make for a lonely burden, and we are supposed to feel her pain. Instead, we feel our own for having to sit through this silly movie." Puig concluded that Garner "is far more appealing when she's playing charming and adorable, as she did so winningly in 13 Going on 30. Paul Byrnes of The Sydney Morning Herald explained that "if the film isn't as bad as some others in the comics-to-cinema genre (Halle Berry's Catwoman has rather lowered the bar), that's not to say it's good." Jonathan Rosenbaum of the Chicago Reader writes: "This doesn't exactly set the world on fire, but I was charmed by its old-fashioned storytelling, which is refreshingly free of archness, self-consciousness, or Kill Bill-style wisecracks."

Director Rob Bowman was somewhat surprised by the negative reviews. He accepted the difficulty of making something with mass market appeal. "Everybody likes ice cream, but not everybody likes chocolate ice cream". He acknowledged the film's shortcomings and said, "If you can't handle people not liking what you do, you shouldn't be in the business".

=== Accolades ===
Jennifer Garner and Natassia Malthe were nominated for Best Kiss at the 2005 MTV Movie Awards. Garner was nominated in the category Choice Movie Actress: Action Adventure/Thriller at the 2005 Teen Choice Awards.

=== Legacy ===
Film critic Scott Mendelson blamed the film for ruining Jennifer Garner's career and said it killed off the notion of a female lead superhero movie for a decade. In March 2005, producer Avi Arad told investors that Marvel had made a mistake rushing Elektra into release. "We will never do that again," he said. In an email released because of the Sony Pictures hack, Marvel Entertainment CEO Ike Perlmutter cited Elektra as an example of an unprofitable female led superhero film. He wrote: "Very bad idea and the result was very, very bad."

== Marvel Cinematic Universe ==
In 2016, Katharine Trendacosta at io9 reviewed the film and called it "somehow so much worse than you remember" and said that the version of Elektra in Netflix's Daredevil could only be an improvement. Elektra appears in the Marvel's Netflix television series Daredevil and The Defenders, portrayed by Élodie Yung.

Jennifer Garner's Elektra appears in the Marvel Cinematic Universe film Deadpool & Wolverine (2024).

== Video game ==
A J2ME game based on the film was released for mobile phones.
