= The Hand (comics) =

Marvel Comics fictional group

- Textless variant cover art for The New Avengers (vol. 1) #27 (February 2007); Art by Leinil Yu

Publication information
- Publisher: Marvel Comics
- First appearance: Daredevil #174 (September 1981)
- Created by: Frank Miller (writer/artist)

In-story information
- Type of organization: Organized crime
- Agent(s): Betsy Braddock; Daredevil; Elektra; Gorgon; Kingpin; Kirigi; Kwannon; Frank Castle; Master Izo; Colleen Wing; Wolverine

The Hand is a supervillain organization appearing in American comic books published by Marvel Comics. The organization first appeared in Daredevil #174 (cover dated September 1981) and was created by writer/artist Frank Miller; they were introduced shortly after Elektra, who infiltrates the group. Later in the 1980s, they appear in stories written by Chris Claremont as antagonists of Wolverine and the X-Men.

The Hand is an order of evil ninjas, primarily based in Japan, who direct criminal activities, particularly assassination. According to later stories by D.G. Chichester and C.B. Cebulski, they were founded in the 16th century as a secret society of Japanese nationalists but were soon co-opted by the Snakeroot, an ancient ninja clan. The clan serves a primordial demon known as "the Beast of the Hand". Members of the Hand are practitioners of powerful occult magic; they can murder a person and resurrect the person as a servant of the Hand; Elektra has been able to reverse this programming. The Hand's adversary is the Chaste, a band of warriors once led by Stick, the blind martial arts master and mentor of Matt Murdock, who became the costumed crime-fighter Daredevil. After a series of hostile encounters, Murdock eventually accepts the offer of becoming the master of the Hand for a time, in a storyline by Ed Brubaker. After he is rehabilitated, the Punisher also becomes leader of the Hand, in a storyline by Jason Aaron.

The group's appearance in comics has been credited as one of the inspirations for the trend of ninjas in popular culture in the 1980s, and has also been criticized as a stereotypical representation of Japanese culture.

In film, the Hand appeared as the antagonists in Elektra (2005). The organization was subsequently adapted in the Marvel Cinematic Universe (MCU), appearing in Marvel's Netflix television series Daredevil (2016), Iron Fist and The Defenders (both 2017), as well as the film Spider-Man: Brand New Day (2026). They also appear as enemies in the video game Marvel's Wolverine.

== Publication history ==
=== 1980s ===
The Hand first appeared in Daredevil (vol. 1) #174 (cover dated September 1981) and was created by writer/artist Frank Miller. In this initial storyline, the group are hired by Kingpin to kill Daredevil (Matt Murdock); Elektra, who was introduced six issues earlier, in issue #168, protects him. Elektra repeatedly kills one of the Hand's assassins, Kirigi, whom the Hand continually resurrects. Stick, a blind sensei and Daredevil's mentor in his youth, assists Daredevil and Elektra in their struggle. Stick leads an opposing group of ninjas, designated as the Chaste. After Bullseye kills Elektra in Daredevil (vol. 1) #181 (April 1982), the Hand attempts to resurrect her as a "mindless killing machine," but Daredevil purifies her soul by means of a magical ritual. The Chaste succeed in returning her from the dead in Daredevil (vol. 1) #190 (January 1983).

The organization also appears as an enemy of Wolverine in Miller's Wolverine miniseries (September–December 1982), coauthored with Chris Claremont. Miller's miniseries Elektra: Assassin (August 1986 – March 1987) establishes "the Beast", an ancient evil entity that controls the Hand with the intent of destroying the world. The group reappears in the Acts of Vengeance crossover event; in Uncanny X-Men #256 (December 1989), written by Claremont, they transform Psylocke, a member of the X-Men, into a ninja warrior.

=== 1990s and after ===
In Uncanny X-Men #268 (September 1990), again under Claremont's authorship, they reappear in a flashback story taking place during World War II in which they fight Wolverine and Captain America. In 1993, the Hand again appear in Daredevil, in the "Fall from Grace" storyline written by D.G. Chichester; issue #319 (August 1993) introduces the Snakeroot, the inner circle of the Hand. In issue #323 (December 1993), the Hand create an evil, zombie-like version of Elektra, Erynys.

In Mark Millar's "Enemy of the State" storyline (2004–2005) in Wolverine, Wolverine is brainwashed by the Hand into becoming their assassin; Elektra is killed and again resurrected by the Hand, although she rejects their conditioning. The limited series Elektra: The Hand (2004), written by Akira Yoshida (a pseudonym of C.B. Cebulski), provides the history of the organization. During Ed Brubaker's tenure on Daredevil, concluding in 2009, the Hand recruit the titular hero to become their new leader. This storyline continues in the "Shadowland" story arc written by Andy Diggle (September 2010 – January 2011), in which Daredevil transforms the organization into a group of brutal vigilantes. Daredevil is eventually redeemed by a group of other superheroes, and Kingpin takes on leadership of the group. The Diggle series draws from Miller's earlier work in Elektra: Assassin (1986), re-introducing the Beast of the Hand as their guiding force. Kingpin's version of the Hand organization battles Black Panther, who has temporarily taken Daredevil's place as protector of Hell's Kitchen, New York, in Black Panther: The Most Dangerous Man Alive #529 (April 2012). The Hand returned in Daredevil vol. 5 (beginning in February 2016), written by Charles Soule, in which the Beast tortures Daredevil before he is rescued by Blindspot. In Uncanny Avengers (vol. 3) #14–16 (November 2016 – January 2017), the Hand resurrect the Hulk. The group also appears as the main enemy in the Savage Avengers title written by Gerry Duggan, beginning in July 2019. The Punisher becomes the leader of the Hand in Jason Aaron's Punisher series, published in 2022. In Chip Zdarsky's Daredevil vol. 7 (2022), Daredevil and Elektra again team up to fight the Hand.

== Fictional organization history ==
The Hand originated in feudal Japan in the 16th century. Initially a nationalistic secret society opposed to the powerful and corrupt daimyo (lords) of that time as well as new foreign merchants, the organization was founded by Kagenobu Yoshioka. The group took its symbol from a bloody handprint left by Yoshioka's mother when she was wrongfully arrested for murder. Yoshioka recruited leaders from each of the islands of Japan, calling for the islands to unite like fingers clenched in a fist. The group eventually learned black magic to raise people from the dead. The group became corrupted by the Snakeroot Clan and diverted into worship of a demon called the Beast. Master Izo, a founding member of the Hand, split and formed an opposing group, the Chaste, to prevent the organization from achieving its goals. During World War II, the Hand allied with Hydra in an attempt to recruit Black Widow (Natasha Romanova), but were prevented from doing so by Wolverine and Captain America. The ninja clan worked closely with Hydra before their expulsion by Baron von Strucker. After the Chaste expelled her, Elektra infiltrated the Hand to destroy it from within, but the group tricked her into killing her former sensei and corrupted her; she later broke free of its control. The Hand also raised a young woman named Kwannon and trained her to work as an assassin for a Japanese crimelord.

Elektra then works together with Stick, a member of the Chaste, and Daredevil, who had been trained by Stick, to defeat the group. When Kwannon is rendered comatose in battle, the Hand switches her mind with that of Betsy Braddock, a mutant telepath, attempting to make her an improved killer. However, their brainwashing fails, and eventually the mind transfer of Kwannon and Braddock is reversed. Some time later, the Hand subjects Wolverine to mind control; Elektra is able to free him, and they battle Gorgon, who attempts to reforge the alliance between the Hand and Hydra. For a period, a Skrull impostor disguising itself as Elektra leads the group, before it is killed by Echo. Subsequently, the organization succeeds in recruiting Daredevil to command the group. He recruits Colleen Wing, recounting how Wing's mother had once led an all-woman unit in the Hand, called the Nail; Colleen tries to re-create the Nail and use it for good, before realizing Daredevil's increasing corruption. Daredevil is rescued and rehabilitated, leading to a period of Hand leadership by Kingpin. The group then manipulates the Punisher into becoming their leader, playing on his emotions by resurrecting his murdered wife. The Punisher and the Hand then battle with Daredevil and Elektra, who led a new organization called the Fist.

== Reception ==
Sean Howe identifies the significance of the Hand's early appearances in Daredevil as contributing to the 1980s trend of ninjas in popular culture, along with Eric Van Lustbader's novel The Ninja and Chuck Norris's film The Octagon. In Teenage Mutant Ninja Turtles, the Foot Clan were initially created as a parody of the Hand.

The Hand has drawn criticism as an example of the racial stereotype of Yellow Peril. Scholar Eric Sobel describes the Hand as one of many "unusual, often problematic Japanese representations" present in the work of Frank Miller. J. Andrew Deman also views the Hand's transformation of Psylocke from a white woman into a sexualized Japanese woman as racially insensitive; he quotes Anna Lam, who describes the Hand's brainwashed and race-swapped Psylocke as "a fetishized Asian sex object in the style of the classic Dragon Lady of the 1930s." In addition, there has been cultural appropriation controversy about the work of C.B. Cebulski, on social media and in the press, who wrote much of the canonical backstory of the Hand, because he is a white American who adopted a false persona as a Japanese author.

== In other media ==
The Hand first appeared in film as the antagonists in Elektra (2005). The Hand subsequently appears in media set in the Marvel Cinematic Universe (MCU), first appearing in the second season of Daredevil (2016). Actor Peter Shinkoda, who plays Nobu Yoshioka in the series, criticized the racial depiction of the Hand in this adaptation. The organization subsequently appears in the first season of Iron Fist and in the miniseries The Defenders. The Hand also appear in the film Spider-Man: Brand New Day (2026). The Hand appear as an enemy faction in the video game Marvel's Wolverine (2026).

== Bibliography ==
- Beaty, Bart, ed. (2012). Critical Survey of Graphic Novels: Heroes and Superheroes. Salem Press. ISBN 978-1-58765-865-5.
  - Hall, Stefan (2012). "Elektra: Assassin". In Beaty, Bart (ed.). Critical Survey of Graphic Novels: Heroes and Superheroes. pp. 242–246.
- Burroughs, Todd Steven (2018). Marvel's Black Panther: A Comic Book Biography from Stan Lee to Ta-Nehisi Coates. Diasporic Africa Press. ISBN 978-1-937306-64-9.
- Cebulski, C.B., ed. (2024). Marvel Encyclopedia: New Edition. DK. ISBN 978-0-5938-4611-7.
- Cowsill, Alan (2021). The Way of the Warrior: Marvel's Mightiest Martial Artists. DK. ISBN 978-0-7440-2719-8.
- Cowsill, Alan (2025). Wolverine: The First 50 Years. Titan Publishing Group. ISBN 978-1787744028.
- Deman, J. Andrew (2023). The Claremont Run: Subverting Gender in the X-Men. University of Texas Press. ISBN 978-1-4773-3075-3.
- Diggle, Andy (2011). Shadowland. Marvel Entertainment. ISBN 978-0-7851-4762-6.
  - Harrold, Jess. "Lost in the Shadows: Interview with Andy Diggle". In Diggle (2011).
- Guynes, Sean; Lund, Martin, eds. (2020). Unstable Masks: Whiteness and American Superhero Comics. Ohio State University Press. ISBN 978-0814255636.
  - Sobel, Eric. "The Whitest There Is At What I Do: Japanese Identity and the Unmarked Hero in Wolverine (1982)". In Guynes & Lund (2020), pp. 226-241.
- Howe, Sean (2012). Marvel Comics: The Untold Story. Harper Perennial. ISBN 978-0-06-199211-7.
- Lindsay, Ryan K., ed. (2013). The Devil is in the Details: Examining Matt Murdock and Daredevil. Sequart Research & Literacy Organization. ISBN 9780578073736.
  - Darius, Julian. "What Fall from Grace? Reappraising the Chichester Years". In Lindsay (2013), pp. 166–191.
- McEniry, Matthew J., ed. (2016). Marvel Comics into Film: Essays on Adaptations Since the 1940s. McFarland & Co. ISBN 978-0-7864-4304-8.
  - Binns, Daniel. "You Can't Stop Her: Elektra Re-configured". In McEniry (2016), pp. 39-49.
- Ridout, Cefn, ed. (2022). Marvel Year by Year: A Visual History: New Edition. DK. ISBN 978-0-7440-5451-4.
  - DeFalco, Tom. "1980s". In Ridout (2022), pp. 184-233.
  - Wiacek, Stephen (Win). "2010s, 2020s". In Ridout (2022), pp. 334-389.
- Segura, Alex (2025). Daredevil: The Illustrated History. Insight Editions. ISBN 979-8-88663-920-9.
- Wiacek, Stephen "Win" (2018). Black Panther: The Ultimate Guide. DK. ISBN 978-1-4654-6626-6.
- Young, Paul (2016). Frank Miller's Daredevil and the Ends of Heroism. Rutgers University Press. ISBN 978-0-8135-6381-7.
