= Silverclaw =

Fictional character in the Marvel universe

- Silverclaw of the Avengers

Publication information
- Publisher: Marvel Comics
- First appearance: Avengers vol. 3 #8 (September 1998)
- Created by: Kurt Busiek (writer); George Pérez (artist)

In-story information
- Alter ego: Maria De Guadalupe "Lupe" Santiago
- Team affiliations: Avengers; Empire State University
- Notable aliases: La Garra Argentado, Daughter of the Volcano God
- Abilities: Ability to change into various metal were-animal forms

Silverclaw (Maria De Guadalupe "Lupe" Santiago) is a superhero appearing in American comic books published by Marvel Comics. The character is depicted as a reserve member of the Avengers and regards Edwin Jarvis as an uncle figure.

== Creation ==
Busiek spoke on the creation of the character stating,

"I'd had an idea years ago for a different way to handle Animal Man's powers, visually, and wanted to try it. It didn't work — George wanted to draw her transformations like he had Beast Boy's. So maybe I'll try it again some other time.

Bob Harras had also challenged us to come up with new Avengers, so I thought I'd try to create someone with third to Jarvis, which is where a lot of the character came from as well."

== Publication history ==
Silverclaw first appeared in Avengers vol. 3 #8 (September 1998), and was created by writer Kurt Busiek and artist George Pérez.

== Fictional character biography ==
Maria de Guadalupe Santiago was born near the village of the Kamekeri in the country of Costa Verde. The Kamekeri formerly worshiped their own pantheon of gods until Spanish missionaries taught them Christianity, causing them to abandon their gods. Most of the gods left for the heavens except for the volcano goddess Peliali, who vowed to remain with and protect the Kamekeri.

Lupe is the daughter of Jaime Santiago, who studied the Kamekeri's ancient beliefs and pantheon. Jaime claimed that Lupe was his daughter with Peliali, with the two having met in the mountains of Costa Verde. During Lupe's baptism, she manifests the ability to transform into various animals native to Costa Verde, which causes her to be ostracized.

Jaime Santiago dies when Lupe is a child, with her being taken in by a local orphanage funded by the American charity ChildCare. Edwin Jarvis, butler to Tony Stark and the Avengers, decides to sponsor ChildCare and is specifically assigned to help Lupe in case her powers grow out of control.

Years later, Lupe comes to the United States to attend Empire State University and meet Jarvis. En route, the plane Lupe is traveling on is hijacked by terrorists working for Moses Magnum. When the terrorists take hostages, Lupe is forced into helping them. Lupe explains to the Avengers that she was forced into helping the terrorists and accompanies the group in defeating Magnum. Lupe begins studying at Empire State University, helping the Avengers whenever needed and becoming the hero Silverclaw.

Silverclaw later discovers that the wizard Kulan Gath has conquered Costa Verde and intends to kill Peliali to gain her power. Gath's forces overwhelm the assembled heroes, who are captured and forced to watch as Gath fatally wounds Peliali. The Avengers stop Gath, but Peliali dies from her wounds.

In Civil War, Silverclaw battles Ms. Marvel when she attempts to make her support the Superhuman Registration Act (SHRA). Silverclaw opposes the SHRA because it is not legal in Costa Verde.

Silverclaw's last major appearance is in the Hulk story arc "Mayan Rule", where she helps battle the Mayapan, a group of Inhumans who pose as gods.

== Powers and abilities ==
Silverclaw possesses the superhuman ability to mimic the physical characteristics of various animals native to rainforests and jungles, which includes jaguars, anacondas, cockatoos, monkeys, sloths, pumas, cheetahs, and crocodiles.

== Reception ==
George Marston of Newsarama ranked Silverclaw as the sixth worst Avengers member, describing her story as "a little better than Triathlon's, but the character was infinitely lamer" and that she had the power to "dress like an extra from a Tarzan film". Darren Franich of Entertainment Weekly ranked Silverclaw 20 out of 85 when ranking every Avenger, calling her an uninteresting character but praising her unusual powers.
