= Kingsize (comics) =

Publication information
- Publisher: Marvel Comics
- First appearance: Marvel Super-Heroes #3 (Fall 1991)
- Created by: Dwight Zimmerman, Amanda Conner

In-story information
- Team affiliations: Ricadonna's Rogues
- Abilities: Shapeshifting

Kingsize is a fictional character appearing in American comic books published by Marvel Comics.

== Fictional character biography ==
Kingsize is a supervillain who stands 12 feet tall. He attacks the Wasp in the form of a giant bull as she is modeling her own fashion-wear at Bloomingdale's and also battles Dakota North. Kingsize claims to Wasp that she made life for the giants impossible. Wasp defeats him by firing a sting-blast at the jewel on his forehead.

During the "Civil War" storyline, Kingsize, Blue Streak (Jonathan Swift), Flame, and Ferocia have Skrull organs transplanted into them, which gives Kingsize enhanced shapeshifting abilities. Kingsize and his allies wait in the Corporation HQ on Hart Island, where he trains his abilities. During the Heroes for Hire's attack on the Corporation's facility, Kingsize battles Orka and is defeated.

== Powers and abilities ==
Kingsize can transform into any animal by touching the jewel on his brow. He does not need to touch it to transform back into human form and he reverts to normal when knocked unconscious.

In Heroes for Hire (vol. 2), Kingsize receives a Skrull organ transplant that gives him enhanced shapeshifting abilities enabling him to also assume non-animal forms.
