= Flame (Marvel Comics) =

Fictional character

Flame is the name of several characters appearing in American comic books published by Marvel Comics. The original Flame, Dan Springer, first appeared in Dazzler #23 (January 1983) and was created by Danny Fingeroth and Frank Springer.

== Fictional character biography ==
=== Dan Springer ===
Flame

Publication information
- Publisher: Marvel Comics
- First appearance: Dazzler #23 (January 1983)
- Created by: Danny Fingeroth; Frank Springer

In-story information
- Alter ego: Dan Springer
- Team affiliations: Ricadonna's Rogues
- Abilities: Expert arsonist Shapeshifting

Flame is an arsonist who was hired by the landlord Crowley to burn down Dazzler's apartment after Crowley's tenants refuse to buy his co-op shares. Dazzler hires Power Man and Iron Fist to find the culprit. Flame catches up to Dazzler and tries to kill her, but she is able to defeat him.

During the "Civil War" storyline, Flame, Ferocia, Blue Streak, and Kingsize break Ricadonna from Sing Sing. Flame gains shapeshifting abilities after being implanted with Skrull organs. He and his allies wait in the Corporation HQ on Hart Island, where he hones his new powers. During the Heroes for Hire's attack on the Corporation's facility, Flame battles Orka, and is later carried by Shang-Chi into an escape tunnel before it explodes.

During the "Dark Reign" storyline, Flame is among the villains researched by Quasimodo for Norman Osborn. Quasimodo states that Flame is unstable to be used or go after due to the Skrull organs in him.

=== Chaste version ===
Flame is a member of the Chaste who learned how to generate fire from his palms.

=== Plug-Uglies version ===
Flame is an unnamed flamethrower-wielding man who is a member of a duo called the Plug-Uglies.

== Powers and abilities ==
The first Flame is an expert arsonist. Skrull organs transplanted into his body by the Corporation allowed him to shapeshift.

The second flame can generate fire from his palms.

=== Equipment ===
The first Flame's costume is fireproof and has goggles to protect his eyes from the intense glare of the fires he lights. The gloves of his costume are fitted with miniature flame-throwers and can shoot fireballs from the fingertips. He also wields a "fire-sword" which is a blade of super-hot flame. His method of transportation is his motorcycle, which has been redesigned to make no noise when running.

The second Flame wields a katana which he carries on his back.

The third Flame wields a flamethrower.
