= Gerry Duggan =

Gerry Duggan may refer to:

- Gerry Duggan (actor) (1910–1992), Irish-born Australian character actor
- Gerry Duggan (writer), American comics writer, director and photographer
