= Stick (character) =

Comic book superhero

- Artwork of Stick from The Official Handbook of the Marvel Universe Deluxe Edition #20 (February 1988); Art by Bill Sienkiewicz

Publication information
- Publisher: Marvel Comics
- First appearance: Daredevil #176 (November 1981)
- Created by: Frank Miller

In-story information
- Place of origin: New York City
- Team affiliations: The Chaste
- Partnerships: Daredevil; Elektra
- Abilities: Master martial artist Radar sense Acute hearing, taste, touch and smell Telepathy; Ability to drain life energy from another person

Stick, also known as Sadhan, is a character appearing in American comic books published by Marvel Comics. He is a blind sensei and leader of the Chaste who trained Matt Murdock and Elektra Natchios.

Stick appeared in the 2005 film Elektra portrayed by Terence Stamp. Scott Glenn portrayed the character in the TV series Daredevil (2015–2016) and The Defenders (2017), set in the Marvel Cinematic Universe (MCU).

== Publication history ==
Stick first appeared in Daredevil #176 and was created by Frank Miller.

== Fictional character biography ==
The mysterious Stick is a blind sensei who trained Matt Murdock.

Stick has made it his mission to keep the Chaste pure and clean from any evil infection. He forbade another of his prominent students, Elektra Natchios, from remaining in their ranks because of her vengeful personality, despite her skill.

Stick is quite punishing and arrogant with his charges. He encountered Wolverine in his feral state and brought him back to reasoning, in part because of continued battering from his bō staff and hard-nosed advising.

Eventually, the Hand sought to wipe out Stick and the good warriors of the Chaste altogether. Stick thwarted an assassination attempt by four Hand operatives; he then summoned the other members of his order to New York City. With the assistance of his clan, Stick defeated Kirigi, the Hand's most lethal ninja at the time. The Hand regrouped and attacked Stick and his band of warriors (Shaft, Stone, and Claw) that now included Daredevil and Daredevil's former lover, Black Widow. The Hand had almost overpowered the small band of warriors, when Stick and Shaft resorted to an ancient technique that drained the life force from all ninja present. Unfortunately, the technique resulted in the explosion and deaths of Stick and his comrade as a result of the excess energy they had absorbed.

As part of All-New, All-Different Marvel, the Collector resurrects Stick to compete for him in the third iteration of the Contest of Champions. During the fourth on-panel battle, Stick secretly allies with the Sentry of Earth-1611, a reluctant member of the opposing team assembled by the Grandmaster. When their alliance is revealed, the two are vaporized by Punisher 2099's Molecular Disintegrator. While experimenting with the Iso-Sphere, the Maestro unintentionally brings Stick back in the body of an alternate version of Rick Jones.

== Other versions ==
=== Ultimate Marvel ===
An alternate universe version of Stick appears in Ultimate Avengers. This version is a former colleague of Matt Murdock who trained alongside him as a student of Anthony. Stick is later seen training a 13-year-old blind boy (Ray Connor) to become the next Daredevil after Murdock's death in the NY Ultimatum wave. Stick has been training Ray for weeks and is about to graduate, but is later bitten and turned into a vampire. Stick is subsequently killed by Blade.

=== Spider-Gwen ===
In Spider-Gwen, Stick is depicted as a vigilante who saves a young Matt Murdock after his father is killed in front of him, recruiting him to his war on crime before he himself is killed in battle by ninja; Matt subsequently kills the ninja who killed Stick, before he is recruited to the Hand, ultimately setting on the path towards becoming Kingpin.

== In other media ==
=== Television ===
==== Live action ====
- Stick appears in television series set in the Marvel Cinematic Universe, portrayed by Scott Glenn.
  - Introduced in a self-titled episode of Daredevil (2015), he approaches Matt Murdock shortly after his father is killed, leaving him orphaned at the age of ten, and begins to train him. Stick teaches Matt to master his abilities but leaves when Matt begins to see him as a father figure as he considers such feelings to be a weakness that will prevent Matt from reaching his full potential. Many years later, Stick enlists Matt's help in destroying the Black Sky, a weapon that the Hand, led by Murakami's second-in-command Nobu, are bringing to New York City. Stick reluctantly agrees to refrain from killing but breaks his promise when he kills the Black Sky, who is actually a young boy. After fighting in Matt's apartment, Matt defeats Stick, who is impressed and agrees to leave the city. Stick later converses with a heavily scarred man about Matt's role in events to come. In the second season, Stick takes a more prominent role as he rescues Matt and Elektra from the Hand when they are attacked while investigating Midland Circle. During Elektra's recovery, he reveals more about the history of the Hand and how he raised and trained Elektra when she was young.
  - Stick reappears as a main cast member in The Defenders. Stick is introduced being held captive by Elektra and Alexandra, who managed to capture him after killing all of his fellow associates within the Chaste. Stick manages to escape, cutting off his own right hand to free himself from his restraints. Through a tip from Colleen Wing, he tracks down Matt, Jessica Jones, Luke Cage, and Danny Rand to recruit their help. They manage to fight their way out when Alexandra, Madame Gao, Sowande, Murakami and Elektra attack them. They escape, in the process capturing Sowande. Stick later decapitates Sowande when he tries to kidnap Danny. Convinced that Danny needs to be killed to prevent the Hand from acquiring him, Stick has him tied to a chair and left under Luke's guard, then uses incense to drug Luke. This proves to be Stick's undoing, as Elektra tracks Danny down to the hideout and attacks Stick. After a short sword fight, Elektra disarms her former sensei, and just as Matt and Jessica arrive, she stabs him to death in spite of Matt's attempts to talk her down.
  - Glenn revealed that Jeph Loeb had told him that Stick could still return in future Marvel projects despite the character's death; saying "I remember Jeph saying, 'We're in the Marvel Universe. If Elektra kills you, that doesn't necessarily mean you're dead.' And I said, 'Okay.' But for me, the show is over, unless I get a phone call, and then it will or won't [continue] depending on the deal and all of that stuff. It's hard to answer that question [would he be interested in reprising the role]. All of that stuff really lies with the script writer and with lines, and do I really want to go back and deal with those contact lenses again? I don't know. It's an impossible question to answer."

==== Animation ====
Stick makes a non-speaking cameo appearance in the Spider-Man: The Animated Series episode "Framed".

=== Film ===
Stick appears in Elektra, portrayed by Terence Stamp. He is shown as having resurrected Elektra after her death at the hands of Bullseye. He then seeks to train her further to unlock her full potential but later ends the training prematurely when Elektra cannot let go of her desire for vengeance. Several years later, Stick makes a living as a pool hustler by utilizing his blindness to fool opponents. Elektra turns to him for help protecting a young girl named Abby from The Hand who seek to exploit her, but Stick later reveals that he is in fact responsible for putting Abby in danger, believing that only by forcing Elektra to protect an innocent life would she finally overcome her anger. Elektra does manage to put aside her rage and save Abby's life, and Stick departs after the two finally demonstrate their respect for each other.

=== Video games ===
- Stick appears in the Daredevil (2003) tie-in game.
- Stick appears as a mini-boss and unlockable playable character in Marvel Avengers Academy.

== In popular culture ==
The character Splinter from the media franchise Teenage Mutant Ninja Turtles was created as a parody of Stick.

== See also ==
- Zatoichi
