= Elektra (character) =

Marvel Comics fictional character

Elektra Natchios
- Textless cover of Elektra #3 (November 2001). Art by Greg Horn.

Publication information
- Publisher: Marvel Comics
- First appearance: As Elektra: Daredevil #168 (Jan. 1981); As Daredevil: King in Black #1 (Dec. 2020; cameo); Daredevil vol. 7 #25 (Dec. 2020; full appearance)
- Created by: Frank Miller

In-story information
- Full name: Elektra Natchios
- Team affiliations: Thunderbolts; The Hand; S.H.I.E.L.D.; The Chaste; Savage Avengers
- Partnerships: Daredevil
- Notable aliases: Erynys; Daredevil; Woman Without Fear
- Abilities: Peak human physical and mental condition; Master martial artist; Expert with various types of weaponry, such as her trademark twin sai; Possession

Elektra Natchios (UK: /ˈnætʃiɒs/, US: /-oʊs/; Greek: Ηλέκτρα Νάτσιος) is a character appearing in American comic books published by Marvel Comics. Created by Frank Miller, the character first appeared in Daredevil #168 (cover dated January 1981). She is depicted as a highly trained assassin of Greek descent who was driven by trauma to train under the Hand, and subsequently become an independent assassin, using her trademark weapon: the sai. Initially created as a supporting character for the superhero Matt Murdock / Daredevil, Elektra has functioned as his villainous adversary, love interest, and eventual heroic ally. Her violent nature and mercenary lifestyle have served as a divisive point of conflict between them, culminating in her becoming the second Daredevil in 2020.

One of Frank Miller's best-known creations, Elektra was killed by Bullseye at the conclusion of her first story arc in 1982. She was later resurrected and became a regularly appearing character, headlining three ongoing series. She has also appeared as a supporting character of Wolverine and in other series and mini-series, including as a member of the Thunderbolts and the Savage Avengers. She is also present in independent publications, such as Elektra: Assassin, which functions as a broader satire on American culture and politics.

Miller designed the physical appearance around female bodybuilder Lisa Lyon and he constructured her personality around the Electra complex theory from Carl Jung, and her stories explore themes of madness, trauma, and moral ambiguity. Portrayed as both a femme fatale and a sex symbol, Elektra was one of the primary inspirations for the Bad Girl art trend of the 1990s in American comics, and has influenced subsequent characters across multiple media.

Elektra has been presented in numerous live action film and television adaptations. Jennifer Garner portrayed Elektra in the films Daredevil (2003), Elektra (2005), and Deadpool & Wolverine (2024). Élodie Yung portrayed the character in the MCU television series Daredevil (2016) and The Defenders (2017), and will return in the upcoming third season of Daredevil: Born Again (2027).

== Publication history ==
=== Creation ===
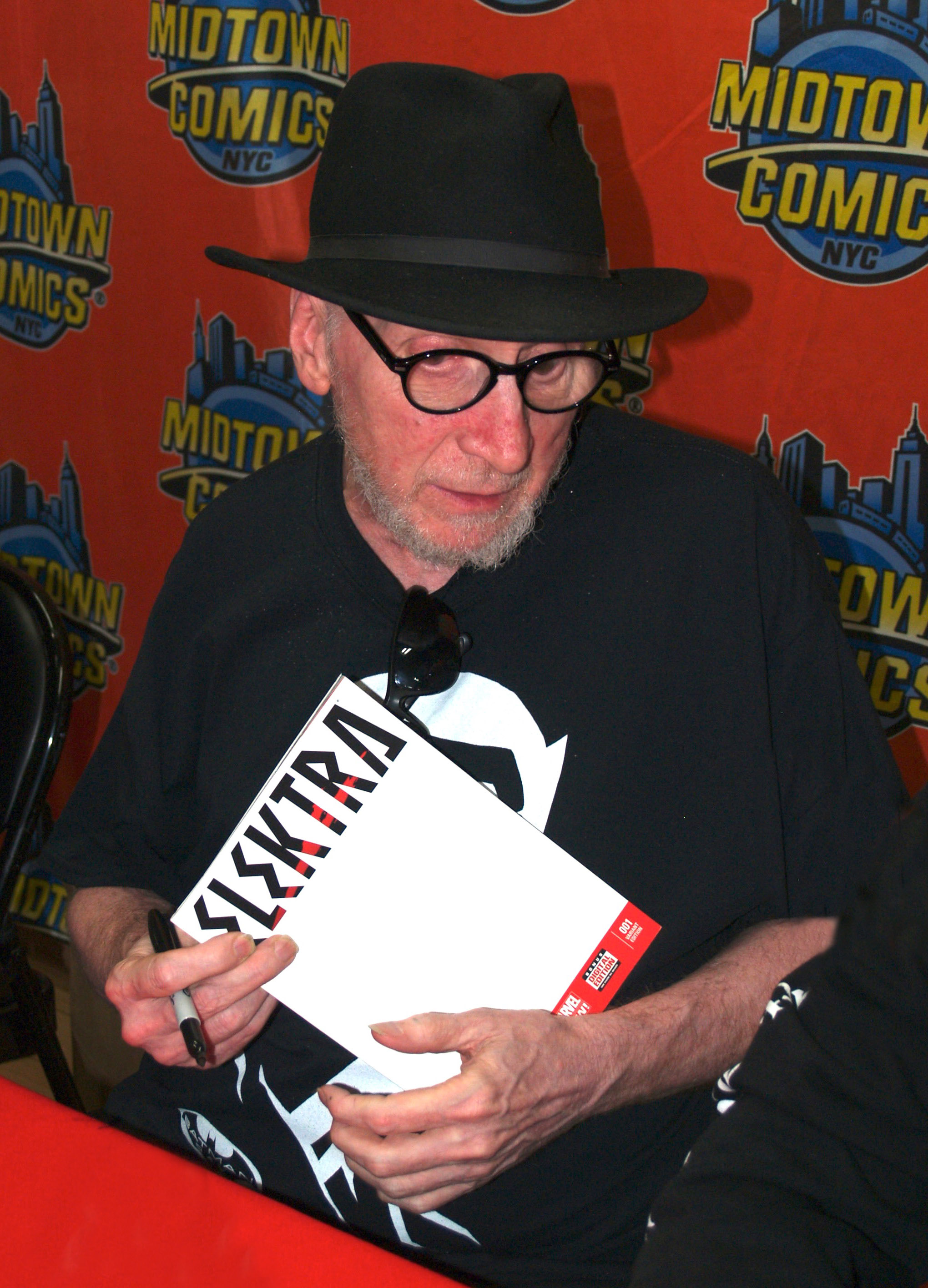
Frank Miller signing a copy of the Elektra comics series during an appearance at Midtown Comics

Comics scholar P. L. Thomas points out that Elektra "presents many problems for a unified Marvel Universe because her origin and existence have been refashioned often despite her minor status." Her different appearances often present very different characterizations for her or re-work her background in fragmented ways, even in the original stories about her written by Frank Miller.

Elektra was created by Miller, who based the character's appearance on female bodybuilder Lisa Lyon. Miller and Janson also sometimes modeled her appearance on the actress Bo Derek. Miller initially named the character "Indigo" and intended the character to employ Japanese martial arts. Miller has said that he designed the character around Electra, a character in Greek tragedy, and the Electra complex theorized by Carl Jung. In an interview, Miller says that the character was inspired by Sand Seref, a femme fatale character in Will Eisner's series, The Spirit, and that he had adapted Sand Seref's first appearance but made it harsher. Some critics have compared the character to Catwoman, who has a similar ambivalent relationship with Batman, although Elektra is portrayed as much more dangerous and violent. Another comics scholar, Daniel Binns, compares Elektra to Wonder Woman, who also has a complex backstory that has often been revised, links to Greek mythology, and a complex gender expression that combines strongly feminine characteristics with traditionally masculine activities.

=== 1980s ===
Elektra first appeared in Daredevil #168 (January 1981). Miller intended this issue, which was essentially a filler story, to be Elektra's only appearance. She instead became a frequently appearing villain in Daredevil, until she was murdered by Bullseye in issue #181 (April 1982). She was resurrected shortly after, but the story contains a narrative note which indicates that Daredevil must never encounter her again. Elektra's death issue was best-selling, but the event was very controversial among fans; Miller received death threats, which he reported to the FBI.

Miller collaborated with Bill Sienkiewicz on Elektra: Assassin, a surrealistic, satirical miniseries that ran from 1986 to 1987. Mary Jo Duffy, the editor who initiated the project, writes that Sienkiewicz was the chosen artist because of his skills: "the fine drafting, the loony caricatures, and the high-style infusion of sex-and-drugs-and-rock'n'roll." In the story, Elektra discovers that a US presidential candidate intends to launch a nuclear war. In opposing him, Electra enters into a complex and ambivalent relationship with John Garrett, a S.H.I.E.L.D. cyborg. The series concludes with the successful election of the candidate, but the replacement of his mind by Garrett's. While the story initially had an unclear relationship to the larger Marvel canon, aspects of the story were later incorporated into mainstream continuity. The series was released as part of Epic Comics, a more mature Marvel imprint.

The art for the story is highly experimental; as one critic, Stefan Hall, remarks, "Sienkiewicz uses collage, oil painting, mimeograph, and other artistic forms generally uncommon in comic books and graphic novels." Hall points out that the mixed-media approach draws from Robert Rauschenberg and the caricatures of main characters are indebted to Ralph Steadman. The series appeared the same year as Miller's highly influential The Dark Knight Returns, and shares tone and themes.

=== 1990s ===
In 1990, Elektra appeared in another Miller creation, Elektra Lives Again. This is an avant-garde story that takes place outside normal Marvel continuity. It won an Eisner Award for "Best Graphic Album: New". In the narrative, Daredevil is haunted by dreams about Elektra's past, death and potential resurrection. The story largely takes place in dreams and has been described as surreal. Aesthetically, the graphic novel also anticipates Miller's later work in Sin City. In 1993, Miller revisited the character in the miniseries Daredevil: The Man Without Fear. Taking place in the past before Matt Murdock took on the Daredevil identity, the story elaborates the relationship between Murdock and Elektra Natchios. This version of the character contrasts with the earlier depiction of their relationship in Miller's Daredevil stories of the 1980s, in which Elektra is innocent as a young woman; in The Man Without Fear, Elektra is already aggressive and unhinged even in her initial romance with Murdock.

[Elektra] begins The Man without Fear as an Amazon, bounding around Manhattan from building to building wearing a maniacal grin, nearly killing people just for the thrill of it, while Matt, mesmerized by her prowess, mostly goes along for the ride.

— Paul Young, Frank Miller's Daredevil and the Ends of Heroism

After over a decade's absence from regular continuity, she reappeared in the Daredevil "Fall from Grace" story line (#324–327, Jan.–April 1994). This upset Frank Miller, who claimed that Marvel had previously promised him that the character would not be used in any publication. The art was by Scott McDaniel. Chichester's story establishes that Elektra: Assassin is a hallucinatory distortion of canonical events in which Elektra took part, in the mind of the cyborg Garrett. Daredevil writer D. G. Chichester recounted that he and editor Ralph Macchio had discussed the character's return several times:

We'd bandied about the idea [of bringing back Elektra] in a casual fashion now and again, but neither of us wanted to do it as a gimmick. On the rare occasion I thought I had a legitimate angle to use her, Ralph was cool to the idea. But as we geared up for what would become "Fall From Grace", Ralph out of the blue said, "What about bringing back Elektra?" – and it was really the missing piece that clicked together all the loose pieces of the story in my head, and became the nexus for everything tying together as well as it did. In my mind, it's always been her to whom the title refers.

An four-issue Elektra miniseries was published in 1995 (March–June), with the cover indicating the subtitle Root of Evil. As with the 1994 appearances in Daredevil, the miniseries was produced by the creative team of Chichester and McDaniel. It was not particularly well-received.

Electra served as a supporting character in Wolverine, written by Larry Hama (in #100–106, April–November 1996). The Wolverine story arc establishes that Elektra has been re-trained and rehabilitated by Stick and is now morally good. As a spin-off of this storyline, in 1996 she starred in an ongoing series that lasted nineteen issues, initially written by the same author along with Peter Milligan and illustrated by Mike Deodato Jr.; the series has a much lighter tone, and Elektra is much more virtuous. In this period, Marvel vice president Bill Jemas intended the character as emblematic of a new category of titles he called "Bad Girls for Fanboys," essentially providing sex objects; comics scholar Sean Howe laments that "Frank Miller's tragic heroine was not only back from the dead; now she was a cheesecake ninja pinup." However, writing for the series was partly done by Milligan, a respected comics writer who worked on the acclaimed X-Statix series.

=== 2000s ===
Elektra appeared in a second self-titled ongoing series that lasted 22 issues, from 2001 to 2003. While initially written by Brian Michael Bendis, the series was primarily written (after issue #6) by Greg Rucka; Elektra returns to her earlier morally-ambiguous, tormented characterization. In 2002, Rucka also wrote a novella featuring the character along with Wolverine, titled Elektra and Wolverine: The Redeemer. While this is a prose narrative rather than a graphic novel, it includes extensive illustrations by Yoshitaka Amano. In an interview concerning his approach to these characters, Rucka comments on Elektra's allure as tied to her mysterious and enigmatic nature, and states that for this reason she is very difficult to write or to identify with. He describes it as a compelling emotional detachment, and contrasts this to Wolverine's demeanor, which he sees as warmer.

In 2004, Elektra appears as a prominent leading character in Mark Millar's Wolverine storyline "Enemy of the State," with art by John Romita Jr. (who previously drew Elektra in the Man without Fear miniseries a decade earlier). In this storyline, she works with SHIELD to help Wolverine fight the Hand. In the course of events, she appears to be re-brainwashed by the Hand, although this is revealed to be a ruse on her part. However, in order to maintain the deception, she kills a number of SHIELD agents in cold blood.

In the 2007 storyline Secret Invasion written by Bendis, Elektra is kidnapped and replaced by a Skrull, an alien being who can shapeshift to impersonate others; after this Skrull is killed, the real Elektra is returned to Earth. In 2009, Elektra re-appears after her kidnapping by the Skrulls in the miniseries Dark Reign: Elektra by Zeb Wells.

=== 2010s and 2020s ===
In the Shadowland series of 2010, written by Andy Diggle, Elektra fights Daredevil, who has now himself been corrupted by the Hand. In 2011, a more "realistic" version of Elektra appeared in the PunisherMAX series, from Marvel's MAX imprint. This version of the character is Japanese: the Hand lends her services as a bodyguard to the Kingpin, especially to protect him from the Punisher.

In 2013, Elektra appeared as a member of the Thunderbolts in a new series. Elektra featured in a third ongoing series from 2014 to 2015, written by Haden Blackman. This was illustrated in a more surreal, psychedelic style reminiscent of Bill Sienkiewicz's depiction of the character in the 1980s. The primary artist, Mike del Mundo, affirms that his approach is an homage to Elektra: Assassin. Leah Bernstein, a comic-book critic, acclaims this as the best of the Elektra series. Blackman affirms that the character is difficult to write, because it is hard to avoid what he describes as "the stigma of being 'Daredevil's dead girlfriend.'" Nonetheless he concludes that upon completion this was the story and character he is "most proud of writing." In 2019, Elektra featured as part of the Savage Avengers, along with Wolverine, Punisher, Venom, Brother Voodoo, and Conan the Barbarian.

Elektra again encounters Daredevil in a long story arc written by Chip Zdarsky, beginning with Daredevil (2019) #10 (July 2019). As a result of the spell cast to maintain Daredevil's secret identity, Elektra has separated her memories of Matt Murdock and Daredevil and thinks of them as two separate men. While Daredevil is incarcerated, Elektra decides that she needs to impress him with her commitment to protecting innocent people in Hell's Kitchen. In order to do this, she becomes a new Daredevil, making a new costume for herself that modifies the original. She later joins forces with the original Daredevil and they work together as a team up to the conclusion of Zdarsky's Daredevil series with issue #36 in February 2022.

In 2021, Elektra also appeared in a new mini-series titled Elektra: Black, White and Blood. Largely outside of mainstream continuity, each issue features a different writer and generally in the horror comics genre. Authors include Charles Soule, Peter David, Ann Nocenti, Peach Momoko, and Kevin Eastman.

== Characterization ==
=== Fictional character biography ===
Daniel Binns indicates that Elektra's backstory and biography is often presented inconsistently.

Elektra was born in Greece to Hugo Natchios and his wife Christina. She had an older brother named Orestez. Elektra's mother, Christina, is murdered by terrorists, but she gives premature birth to Elektra just before dying. In one version of events, Orestez hires assassins to kill their mother; in another, she is killed during the Greek Civil War. Hugo then hired a sensei to teach her the martial arts. She became a black belt in karate at age 12. One story suggests that Elektra has memories of experiencing childhood sexual abuse by her father. Years of counseling and medication had convinced her this was a false memory, but the doubt remained. This theme disappears from later stories about the character.

Cover to Daredevil Vol. 1 #168 - January 1981, Elektra's first appearance (misspelt as "Elecktra"). Art by Frank Miller.

Hugo Natchios eventually serves as a Greek ambassador to the United States. Nineteen-year-old Elektra attends Columbia University in New York City. There, Elektra began dating classmate Matt Murdock. A year later, Elektra and her father were kidnapped by terrorists. A rescue attempt by Murdock went wrong, and Hugo was gunned down. Elektra lost faith and hope. She quit Columbia and fled to China to study martial arts. Stick, a member of the benevolent Chaste organization, attempted to train her himself.

She sided with the Hand, a sect of mystical ninja who trained her as an assassin, but she later broke away from them and became an independent agent, and in this role she encountered Murdock again, who had taken on the costumed identity of the superhero Daredevil. Although the pair work together to fight the Hand, they also came into conflict. She soon becomes the chief assassin in the employ of the Kingpin, New York City's premier crime lord. She stabs Ben Urich, Daredevil's journalist friend, and nearly disables Daredevil by catching his foot in a bear trap. The Kingpin then assigns her to kill Franklin "Foggy" Nelson, Matt's partner. When Nelson recognizes Elektra as Matt's college girlfriend, she is unable to kill him.

Elektra is fatally stabbed by Bullseye with one of her own sai in a battle over which of them would be the Kingpin's assassin. Elektra manages to crawl to Daredevil's house before dying in his arms. Later, members of The Hand steal her body and attempt to resurrect her. Daredevil, with the assistance of Stone, a member of Stick's order, intervene, defeating The Hand's ninja. Daredevil then tried to revive Elektra himself. Although his attempt fails, it has the effect of purifying Elektra's soul. Elektra's body subsequently disappears, as does Stone.

Later, Elektra was found to have been resurrected by Stone and residing upon the Chaste mountain, where she claimed to have found peace. When Elektra was resurrected, the Hand create a double of Elektra from the darkness that Murdock had purged; this double is named Erynys (/ɪˈrɪnɪs/). Elektra and Daredevil eventually destroy Erynys, and the darkness returns to her soul.

Some time later, Stick sent Elektra to help Wolverine at a time when physically and mentally regressed to a bestial form. She helped retrain Logan to the point where the latter could think and vocalise as a human once more, and they spent time together thereafter as the X-Man returned to a normal form. Elektra brought Wolverine to her childhood home in Greece. Elektra then assembles a team to fight the Snakeroot, an offshoot of the Hand. After defeating them, she visits her father's grave.

Elektra reverts to her earlier profession as an assassin. Eventually, she is hired by S.H.I.E.L.D. when Wolverine is brainwashed by the Hand. Elektra is initially recruited to defeat Wolverine; she feigns an alliance with the Hand and crashes a S.H.I.E.L.D. helicarrier, killing many agents. Elektra eventually joins forces with Wolverine and teaches him to reject his conditioning and fight back against the Hand, as she had learned to do.

Elektra is then attacked by a double, seemingly identical to her. This was a Skrull, a member of an alien species of shape-shifters; they capture her and replaced her with a double, who again joined the Hand. The Skrulls torture Elektra and perform experiments on her to try to learn how she had risen from the dead. Elektra eventually escaped, and her double was killed; she is then briefly incarcerated by Norman Osborn.

Daredevil becomes corrupted by the Hand, and constructed a fortress called Shadowland. Pretending to join him, Elektra infiltrates Shadowland. Elektra is eventually able to help Murdock to redeem himself and extricate himself from the control of the Hand's demon. S.H.I.E.L.D. agents seeking revenge try to hunt Elektra down, but she escapes them. She joins a team assembled by Thunderbolt Ross, the Thunderbolts. She works together with Flash Thompson, the Punisher, and Deadpool. She begins a romantic relationship with the Punisher. She discovers that her brother Orestez, who she had believed was dead, had become a terrorist leader; the Punisher eventually executes him, after Elektra is unable to do so. Elektra works together with Rogue and the Avengers to stop the Hulk when he is also brainwashed by the Hand. She also joins a new team, the Savage Avengers, which includes Wolverine, the Punisher, Brother Voodoo, Conan the Barbarian, and Venom, who continue to fight a new manifestation of the Hand.

The Purple Children apply magic to erase the knowledge of Daredevil's secret identity from the world, so Elektra comes to believe that Daredevil and Matt Murdock are two separate former lovers of hers. She enters into a new alliance with him. She takes on the identity of Daredevil while Murdock was imprisoned, and when he is released they work together as a duo of Daredevils, fighting Wilson Fisk.

=== Abilities and equipment ===
Elektra's primary abilities are a strong knowledge of martial arts and weaponry; she is also an Olympic-level athlete. Her primary fighting style is ninjutsu. Her signature weapon is her sai, a three-pointed melee weapon. As Miller describes:

It's referred to as a karate weapon, since the power of almost every karate blow can be amplified with it. [...] It's called a sai. Since it makes every karate blow more powerful, it would be a natural weapon for a woman to use. It makes her able to reach further. Since she's smaller than most of her opponents, this is the sort of weapon that would help her.

Elektra possesses telepathic abilities that allow her to create illusions in the minds of others and possess their bodies.

=== Personality and motivations ===
Elektra is an unusually ruthless antihero and femme fatale. Scholar Paul Young defines some of her defining initial characteristics as including her succinct speech patterns, her "athletic, eroticized body," her father complex, and her lethal weapons and fighting prowess. He notes that another critic, Larry Rodman, memorably compared her to a "psychotic swimsuit model." Young points out that Elektra combines the femme fatale of film noir with chopsocky martial arts films. The character is also associated with hypersexuality, particularly in the 1993 Man without Fear miniseries.

She shows few compunctions about killing her adversaries, and in some stories even kills innocent people. However, she maintains a strong affection for Matt Murdock and, later, other people she admires. She is often morally conflicted and attempts to use her skills for good. Miller says that Elektra's violent disposition originates from the trauma of the loss of her father, and that he meant the character to illustrate Jung's Electra complex: "She was a young woman who had her sexual interest centered on her father, and just as she was transferring this to another man, her father is killed." Miller argues that this initial anger led to corruption by other forces (the Hand and the Kingpin). In his view she is not essentially good, but rather "one of the villains who's got a weak streak in them." After her resurrection, in the 1996 ongoing series written by Peter Milligan, she has a more conventionally heroic disposition; she vacillates in subsequent stories.

== Themes and motifs ==
Elektra stories tend to emphasize her characteristics as a sex symbol and femme fatale. The Frank Miller stories in particular also explore madness, sadism, death, and mourning. The Elektra: Assassin miniseries is a satire on American culture and politics, in which idealistic justifications for US policy have hidden, obscene motives of dominance, lust, and self-destruction. Comics scholar Stefan Hall compares the work to Frank Miller's other major work of the same year, The Dark Knight Returns, pointing out that both works emphasize the violence of the Cold War. Elektra: Assassin depicts violence to a hyperbolic degree; Hall says it recalls Stanley Kubrick's A Clockwork Orange.

== Supporting characters ==
Elektra was initially a supporting character for Daredevil, as an early girlfriend and an antagonist. He often appears in stories in which she is the main protagonist, and she has a continuing on-again, off-again romantic relationship with him. She also commonly appears in a stories featuring Wolverine. She also sometimes works together with Nick Fury and S.H.I.E.L.D. She also had a brief relationship with the Punisher, and she has joined him on two teams, the Thunderbolts and the Savage Avengers. Her primary antagonists and enemies include the Hand and Bullseye, who at one time succeeded in murdering her (although she was resurrected).

== Reception ==
Elektra's appearances in Miller's initial run of Daredevil were enormously popular; circulation doubled, to average sales of 276,812 copies per month. His story arcs on Daredevil were the only sales competition for Chris Claremont's Uncanny X-Men, the consistent top seller in the 1980s. The issue that depicts Elektra's death, #181, was particularly impactful and controversial. Elektra: Assassin was also widely read; along with Havok & Wolverine, it was the best-selling of Epic's titles.

Dana Jennings, writing for The New York Times, identifies Elektra as "one of comics' best antiheroes." J. Andrew Deman describes Elektra as "an iconic Marvel warrior woman." Following her example, in 1989 Jim Lee and Chris Claremont created a similar costume and fighting style for Psylocke of the X-Men, greatly increasing the popularity of the character. As with Elektra, the Hand trains and shapes Psylocke into a ninja assassin. Rob Liefeld also credited Elektra as his inspiration in creating Domino, a member of X-Force, three years later. Critics Jim Casey and Stefan Hall note Elektra: Assassin as a primary inspiration for David W. Mack's series Kabuki (1994). Elektra was one of the primary inspirations for the Bad girl art trend of the 1990s in American comics.

Doug Petrie, a writer for the television show Buffy the Vampire Slayer, credits Elektra as the inspiration for the character of Faith. In his view, "In a different, teen, punkier context, Faith is so much like Elektra."

== In other media ==
Élodie Yung as Elektra as she appears in Daredevil (2016)

Elektra first appeared in film in the 20th Century Fox film Daredevil (2003), portrayed by Jennifer Garner. Garner returned to the role in a self-titled spin-off film (2005). Following her previous film appearances, Elektra's film rights reverted to Marvel Studios in 2014 and became available for use in the Marvel Cinematic Universe (MCU). Garner would eventually reprise her role as Elektra in the MCU film Deadpool & Wolverine (2024).

On television, Elektra appears in the second season of Daredevil (2016), portrayed by Élodie Yung as an adult. Lily Chee portrays a younger Elektra in flashbacks. She appears again in the miniseries The Defenders (2017). Yung will reprise the role in the third season of the Disney+ series Daredevil: Born Again (2027).

Elektra appears in a number of videogames, including Marvel Ultimate Alliance, Marvel Ultimate Alliance 3, Lego Marvel Superheroes, and Lego Marvel Superheroes 2, as well as mobile and online games including Marvel Heroes, Future Fight, and Puzzle Quest. She also appears in tie-in videogames for the Daredevil and Elektra films.

Elektra has received many pieces of merchandise, including Marvel Legends and Funko Pop figures.

== See also ==
- Women warriors in literature and culture
- Electra
