= Chaste (Marvel Comics) =

Fictional mystical martial arts in Marvel Comics

The Chaste

Publication information
- Publisher: Marvel Comics
- First appearance: Daredevil #187 (October 1982)
- Created by: Frank Miller

In-story information
- Member(s): Stick; Daredevil; Elektra; Stone; Shaft; Claw; Star; Wing; Flame

The Chaste is a fictional heroic mystical martial arts enclave appearing in American comic books published by Marvel Comics. The organization was depicted as being led by Stick, who was created by Frank Miller in the pages of Daredevil.

The Chaste appeared in the Marvel Cinematic Universe series Daredevil (2015-2016) and the miniseries The Defenders (2017).

== Publication history ==
The Chaste was created by writer/artist Frank Miller, and first appeared in Daredevil #187 (October 1982).

The Chaste live in a remote wilderness location that can only be accessed by climbing "the Wall," a sheer cliff. The climb also serves as an entrance exam – those who fail the climb are not considered worthy. The primary function of the Chaste is to combat the Hand, an evil ninja group dominated by a demon.

== Members ==
- Master Izo – Founder of the Chaste. Immortal martial artist, known to be more than 500 years old.
- Stick – Leader of the Chaste. He is known for his use of the bō (staff).
- Daredevil – Blind apprentice of Stick and former lover of Elektra. He is known for his use of his batons and heightened superhuman senses including hearing, touch and taste. He also possesses a radar sense.
- Stone – Stick's second-in-command and former lover. She can withstand any physical attack as long as she is aware of it in advance. In Ultimate Daredevil and Elektra, Stone is an elderly woman who taught Elektra the martial arts.
- Shaft – Uses a bow and arrow.
- Claw – Uses handheld metal blades (similar to Wolverine's adamantium claws) in combat.
- Flame – Power of pyrokinesis. Also wields a katana.
- Star – Uses shuriken.
- Wing – Power of levitation.

== In other media ==
- The Chaste appears in the Marvel Cinematic Universe series Daredevil and The Defenders, with Stick portrayed by Scott Glenn, Stone portrayed by Jasson Finney and voiced by David Sobolov, Star portrayed by Laurence Mason, and Shaft portrayed by Marko Zaror. This version of the group are an army loyal to the Iron Fist who serve K'un-Lun in their war against the Hand.
- The Chaste appears in Elektra.
