= List of Daredevil enemies =

The following is a list of Daredevil enemies.

== A ==
- Angar the Screamer - An assassin whose screams create hallucinations.
- Ani-Men - A group of men equipped with animal-themed costumes by the Organizer. Most of the group would return to form the Unholy Three under the Exterminator (later called the Death-Stalker). The Death-Stalker would later make a second incarnation of the group.

== B ==
- Black Tarantula - A villain shrouded in mystery and misinformation who usually serves as an occasional adversary of Spider-Man.
- Blackwing - The son of Silvermane who employs trained bats.
- Blue Talon - A highly trained martial arts master from Japan with metal gauntlets on his wrists that make his hands stronger when fighting.
- Alexander Bont - The first Kingpin of Hell's Kitchen who returns from prison, claiming revenge against Daredevil for sending him to prison and to Matt Murdock for not helping him out as an attorney.
- Bruiser - A mercenary for hire, he has the ability to move his barycenter to certain parts of his body, allowing him to become a human bulldozer, able to hit from a certain point with all his weight in a burst of strength.
- Bullet - A mercenary who serves as an agent of the United States government.
- Bushwacker - A mutant-killer with a cybernetic gun-arm.
- Bullseye - A psychotic assassin and an archenemy of Daredevil.

== C ==
- Chance - A gambling-themed hitman in a battlesuit.
- Copperhead - A murderous vigilante who died and returned as an agent for a demon.
- Crime-Wave - A criminal mastermind that sought to take over organized crime in New York.
- Crossbow - A British assassin that employs a crossbow.
- Crusher - A villain with super strength.

== D ==
- Dark Messiah - A powerful madman that believed himself to be divine. He transformed three criminals (Josiah, Macabee, and Uriah) to become his Disciples of Doom and would later join Madame MacEvil's Terrible Trio.
- Death-Stalker - Philip Sterling assumed the role of the Death-Stalker (aka the Exterminator) to become a terrifying criminal after gaining strange powers from an accident with a time-displacer ray.
- Death's Head - Karen Page's father who went mad and became a costumed criminal.

== E ==
- Enforcers - A group of non-superpowered thugs who originally appeared as enemies of Spider-Man. Although they have no superpowers, they are formidable fighters.
- Eel - Edward Lavell fought Daredevil with the help of the Enforcers.
- Elektra - Once a lover of Daredevil, now an assassin.

== G ==
- Gladiator - An armored thug who would eventually reform and become an ally of Daredevil.
- Grotto - One of the Kingpin's employees and Turk's partner. A heavy-set, slow-witted bungler who gets beaten up a little less often than Turk, because he gives up more easily.

== H ==
- Hand - A group of super powered ninjas.

== I ==
- Indestructible Man - A munitions seller that became nigh-indestructible and a menace.
- Insomnia - A female villain who worked for Mr. Fear who had enhanced strength, durability and speed with superhuman sight and martial arts skills.
- Ikari - Ikari (Japanese for fury) is a costumed martial artist who is hired by Lady Bullseye to help her kill Daredevil. Ikari wears a Japanese version of Daredevil's original costume and claims to have a radar sense just like him, except he can see. He also carries Kama weapons, like Daredevil carries his billy clubs. Daredevil lost to him the first time, but beat him in their rematch. He later appears in San Francisco now working for the Kingpin, where he helps kidnaps Murdock's friends and fought Daredevil again before being killed by the Shroud. Murdock would later impersonate Ikari to rescue his friends.

== J ==
- Jaguar - An agent for Hydra.
- Jester - A jester-like villain.

== K ==
- Kingpin - A ruthless crime lord and the archenemy of Daredevil, indeed uncontested as Daredevil's greatest enemy. The Kingpin also serves as an enemy for the Punisher and Spider-Man.
- Kirigi - A ninja assassin after being resurrected by the Hand.

== L ==
- Lady Bullseye - A female assassin who models herself after Bullseye.
- Leap-Frog - A frog-themed supervillain; now reformed.

== M ==
- Machinesmith - A villain who specializes in robotics.
- Madame MacEvil - The leader of the Terrible Trio; she later reforms.
- Man-Bull - A man with the appearance of a humanoid bull.
- Felix Manning - A criminal who hired Gladiator to make a copy of the Daredevil costume for an unnamed violent mental patient.
- Masked Marauder - A costumed criminal scientist whose helmet projects "optiblasts" which can temporarily or permanently blind a victim.
- Matador - A criminal who once was a famous bullfighter.
- Mienai - A Japanese assassin with a special gun that makes people lose all their senses. Mienai means cannot see in Japanese
- Mind-Master - Ruffio Costa is a Maggia crime lord who once kidnapped Robert Mallory's son Keith and held him for a ransom of the tidal station plans. This activity attracted the attention of Daredevil and the Black Panther. Due to him using a weapons lab as a hideout, he was bombarded by neutrons from an exploding machine and was transformed into Mind-Master, where he can fire incinerating blasts of psychic energy. Daredevil and the Black Panther were able to fight Mind-Master until his energy ran out and he regressed back to Ruffio. They defeated Ruffio and left him for the police.
- Mister Fear - A villain who uses a hallucinogenic gas to induce fear in others.
- Mister Hyde - A villain whose name and likeness are taken from the book character Dr. Jekyll and Mr. Hyde. Hyde is super-strong and nearly invulnerable.
- Muse - A serial killer that used his victims' remains to create artwork around New York City.
- Mysterio - Master of illusion, also often fought Spider-Man. Battled Daredevil during the "Guardian Devil" story arc.

== N ==
- Nuke - One of the test subjects of the Weapon Plus program.

== O ==
- Owl - An owl-themed crime lord.
- Ox - Mostly one of the Enforcers but has established himself as a Daredevil villain on his own sometimes by occasionally working with Kingpin or Mister Fear.

== P ==
- Paladin - An active and often violent mercenary who is sometimes in conflict with other superheroes.
- Plastoid - A robot assassin.
- Prowler - Aaron Davis is a career criminal and the uncle of Miles Morales, who became the second Spider-Man in this reality.
- Punisher - Frank Castle became the vigilante known as the Punisher to wage his own personal war against the criminal underworld. He comes into conflict with many heroes, most commonly Daredevil.
- Purple Man - A psychotic supervillain who can hypnotically control and manipulates people of his choice.

== R ==
- Ramrod - A cyborg mercenary.

== S ==
- Shock - Daughter of Mr. Fear (Alan Fagan), she has the power to induce fear, hatred and rage in others.
- Silvermane - Crime boss in the Maggia who took over Hydra and tried to take over organized crime in New York. He is also the father of Blackwing.
- Stilt-Man - A thief that employs a suit of power armor and a pair of hydraulic stilts.
- Micah Synn - A Kinjorge chief that ran afoul of Daredevil and Kingpin.
- Stunt-Master - A motorcycle themed villain who has clashed with Daredevil on more than one occasion.

== T ==
- Terrax - A monster who can paralyze by touch.
- Tombstone - One of Kingpin's goons, he possesses durable skin that is as strong as solid concrete and capable of withstanding high caliber bullets and toxic gases.
- Tribune - A mad zealot who led a group to execute who he perceived as enemies of America's way of life.
- Turk Barrett - One of Kingpin's employees, a bumbling idiot who gets beaten up a lot.
- Typhoid Mary - Typhoid Mary is an enemy and former lover of Daredevil with low-level psionic powers.
