= White Tiger (Hector Ayala) =

Marvel Comics character

- Artwork by George Pérez and Javier Tartaglia (2021)

Publication information
- Publisher: Marvel Comics
- First appearance: Deadly Hands of Kung Fu #19 (December 1975)
- Created by: Bill Mantlo (writer); George Pérez (artist)

In-story information
- Alter ego: Hector Ayala
- Species: Human mutate
- Team affiliations: Sons of the Tiger; Defenders; Empire State University
- Notable aliases: El Tigre Blanco
- Abilities: Via mystical amulets: Enhanced physical attributes; Nearly superhuman martial arts skills

White Tiger is a superhero appearing in American comic books published by Marvel Comics. Created by writer Bill Mantlo and artist George Pérez, the character first appeared in The Deadly Hands of Kung Fu #19 (December 1975). A Puerto Rican college student, White Tiger was the first Latin American main character in American comics and Marvel's first Hispanic superhero. White Tiger is the superhero persona of Hector Ayala, a native of San Juan, Puerto Rico, attending Empire State University in New York City. After discovering three mystical tiger amulets discarded by the martial arts team the Sons of the Tiger, Ayala found that wearing all three transformed him into a superhuman fighter with enhanced strength, speed, agility, and near-superhuman mastery of martial arts.

The character was conceived by Mantlo to depict the gritty realities of New York's inner-city neighborhoods, with Pérez drawing on his own experiences growing up Puerto Rican to shape the character. Since his creation, White Tiger has been the subject of discussion around the representation of Latino identity in mainstream American comics, with academics debating whether the character challenged or reinforced prevailing stereotypes about the Nuyorican community.

Hector Ayala is the first member of his family to hold the White Tiger mantle, and is the uncle of Angela del Toro and the brother of Ava Ayala, both of whom later assumed the mantle. In 2003, White Tiger was killed off in a Daredevil storyline where he was accused of murder. His death has remained largely permanent within mainstream continuity and most other media. Hector Ayala appears in the first season of the Marvel Cinematic Universe television series Daredevil: Born Again (2025), played by Kamar de los Reyes.

== Publication history ==
=== Design and creation ===
White Tiger was the first Hispanic superhero in Marvel Comics. He was among the first Hispanic superheroes in mainstream American comics; arguably, he was preceded by El Gaucho, an Argentine version of Batman who appeared in 1955. In 1975, George Pérez and Bill Mantlo collaborated to produce White Tiger; comics scholar Frederick Luis Aldama calls him the first "fully realized Latino superhero". Aldama points out Mantlo's attentiveness to bilingual communication and to Pérez's visual expression of White Tiger's hair and facial features that indicate his AfroLatinidad ancestry. Editors had decided that White Tiger should replace the Sons of the Tiger as the main character of Deadly Hands of Kung Fu, and asked Bill Mantlo to implement this; he intended to adequately depict the "gritty/city slums" of New York City.

Concept art for Hector Ayala as a civilian and the White Tiger.

The magazine gave Mantlo and Pérez unusual creative freedom; Mantlo later recalled that the two "pretty much did as we pleased", working with minimal oversight from Marvel's color comics editorial department. Believing that, due to being Puerto Rican, George Pérez had "intimate knowledge" of the daily life in the South Bronx during the 1970s, he approached the artist with a proposal to create a "character that reflects that grim reality". Due to the monochromatic style of Deadly Hands of Kung Fu, the initial concept for White Tiger's costume was simply Spider-Man's suit "without any detail". With this idea, Pérez designed the visual aspect of the character, to the satisfaction of both as it was considered elegant and worked well within the constraints of the palette.

The artist stated that the socially-conscious Mantlo "was probably more aware of the significance of creating the first Latino Super Hero" headliner and described the process of creating White Tiger as "organic" due to his background. Pérez named that character after some of his "neighborhood friends", gave it a face reminiscent of his brother David and a mother based on his own. The artist illustrated the character's surroundings based on his own experiences in the inner city. The "streamlined" look was meant to emphasize the word "white" and accommodate it to the format, but Pérez later grew to regret not adding stripes to the design. The move set in his illustrations was composed by "exaggerated" martial arts. The character wears T-shirts expressing Puerto Rican cultural pride and also pursues a university education, at Empire State University.

=== 1970s and 1980s ===
White Tiger first appeared in The Deadly Hands of Kung Fu #19 (December 1975). Following his debut, the character subsequently appeared in The Deadly Hands of Kung Fu #20–24 (January–May 1976), #26–27 (July–August 1976), #29–32 (October 1976 – January 1977). Working under Marv Wolfman, then editor of Marvel's black-and-white magazines, Pérez faced sustained criticism of his backgrounds and perspective work during the magazine's run. In response, he produced for approximately issue #21 (February 1976) an elaborate bird's-eye-view splash page of White Tiger surveying a cityscape in which the buildings themselves formed letters, which Pérez credited as a turning point in his draftsmanship and which he later joked had proved Wolfman right rather than wrong. Pérez departed the strip three issues after White Tiger's introduction, returning only for issue #30 (November 1976).

Mantlo moved the character into The Spectacular Spider-Man, where he appeared across numerous issues between 1977 and 1981, as well as in Human Fly #8–9 (April–May 1978) and The Defenders #62–64 (August–October 1978). Mantlo expressed doubt in a 1979 interview about Marvel's willingness to support a Hispanic superhero with his own ongoing series, suggesting they believed the character lacked appeal to what he described as Marvel's "predominantly white middle class" readership.

=== 2000s, 2010s, and 2020s ===
After 20 years, the character was revived in Daredevil #38–40 (December 2002 – February 2003), written by Brian Michael Bendis. The character was framed for murder and killed by police in Daredevil vol. 2 #40 (February 2003). The character made a further appearance, in flashback, in Daredevil #69 (March 2005). Ayala is featured in the one-shot Marvel's Voices: Comunidades #1 (October 2021) in a story titled "Pa'lante Juntos", while his legacy is further explored in another story featuring Ava named "Legados". Upon revisiting Ayala in 2021, Daniel José Older noted that he would not italicize words "when [slipping] back and forth [between Spanish and English] seamlessly." The author based his story on an essay he had written for The New York Times titled "Garbage Fires for Freedom: When Puerto Rican Activists Took Over New York's Streets."

He reappears in Marvel's Voices: Community Vol. 2 #1 (September 2022) as a flashback character in "Secret Savior." In 2025 Marvel published White Tiger: Reborn #1, a one-shot released for Hispanic and Latin American Heritage Month, with stories by Daniel José Older and artist Bruno Abdias, and by Cynthia Pelayo and artist Moises Hidalgo, both making their Marvel Comics debuts with the issue. The comic explores previously unseen moments from Hector Ayala's life and brings him back as a ghost, with Older describing it as "a major turning point in the decades-long saga of the White Tiger."

== Characterization ==
=== Fictional character biography ===
Hector Ayala was born in the city of San Juan, Puerto Rico. He was attending college at Empire State University in New York City, when he found the tiger amulets that the Sons of the Tiger had worn and discarded. By putting on all three amulets, he was transformed into a superhuman form called the White Tiger. He discovered that wearing all the pendants at once increased his strength and gave him nearly superhuman skill in the martial arts. In his alter-ego, Ayala went into action for the first time against a street gang. He then battled the Prowler, who believed him to be a murderer. The White Tiger battled the Jack of Hearts who also believed him to be behind his father's murder. The White Tiger fought off unnamed costumed assailants of the Corporation crime cartel, who were threatening his sister and Jack of Hearts. Alongside Jack of Hearts, Shang-Chi, and Iron Fist, the White Tiger fought Stryke and other agents of the Corporation, and learned his brother Filippo was attempting to find employment with Fu Manchu. Hector then encountered the Sons of the Tiger.

Ayala was impersonated by Professor Vasquez, and battled Spider-Man in the confusion. Ayala's secret identity was later publicly exposed. Alongside Spider-Man and Daredevil, he then battled the Masked Marauder, Darter, and Carrion. Ayala was later gunned down by Gideon Mace and nearly killed. He was operated upon to remove the bullets, and recovered. Having gained an unhealthy psychological and physical addiction to the tiger amulets, Hector abandoned his identity as the White Tiger. He gave the amulets to a private detective nicknamed Blackbyrd, who returned them to the Sons of the Tiger. Hector then moved out west with his girlfriend Holly Gillis. After a while, the call to don the amulets and fight evil became too strong and Hector once again became the White Tiger. Soon after, Hector was wrongly accused of murder and convicted despite the efforts of his lawyer, Matt Murdock (a.k.a. Daredevil). Ayala was shot dead trying to escape, shortly before evidence emerged that proved his innocence.

==== Family legacy ====
Angela Del Toro, Hector's niece and an FBI agent, inherited the Jade Tiger amulets. Angela quit the FBI to understand the amulets, and was trained in the use of their powers by Daredevil, becoming the latest person to assume the White Tiger identity before being killed by the Hand and resurrected as their servant. Having been healed by Black Tarantula, she joined Daredevil in the Hand after he takes over and attempts to reform the organization. However, Angela is still corrupted by the Hand's influence and after Daredevil's attempts fail, she is incarcerated for her crimes.

Hector's teenage sister Ava Ayala inherited the amulets and appeared as the new White Tiger. Angela is later freed by the Maker and given an alternate version of the White Tiger amulets from another universe. Angela and Ava are pitted against each other until both sets of amulets are destroyed, freeing Angela from her corruption but depowers both of them. D'Spayre invades the Tiger God's realm and possesses Hector's ghost. Through Hector, D'Spayre manipulates Ava into summoning him and giving him a corporeal form. When Ava is nearly overwhelmed, the freed Hector and Tiger God appear before her in a vision and the Tiger God makes Ava his permanent host, repowering the White Tiger amulets and merging them with Ava's body, empowering her enough to destroy D'Spayre. Ava and Angela would later be guided by a dream of Hector into reconciling with each other.

=== Powers and abilities ===
As the White Tiger, Hector wears three mystical tiger amulets (a head and two paws) originally part of the Jade Tiger statue from the extra-dimensional city of K'un-Lun. The amulets had previously been worn by the Sons of the Tiger (Abe Brown, Bob Diamond, and Lin Sun), who each discarded their piece when the group dissolved; Hector stumbled across all three and claimed them, gaining access to the power of an ancient entity known as the Tiger God. When wearing the amulets, his physical strength, speed, stamina, agility, dexterity, reflexes, coordination, and balance are all enhanced, though not to the point of being invincible. The amulets also confer on him the experience and abilities of a master martial artist.

In his earliest adventures, the Tiger God fully possessed the White Tiger persona, leaving Hector with no memory of his actions while costumed. He eventually learns of and merges with this persona. Hector's transformation into the White Tiger, or vice versa, neutralizes toxins present in the other's system and may also heal wounds. However, the amulets corrupt their user through physical addiction; removal sends Hector into a painful withdrawal period, though this lessens in severity over time. Enemies took advantage of the White Tiger only possessing his enhanced abilities when wearing all three amulets simultaneously.

== Cultural impact and legacy ==
=== Critical reception and influence ===
Regarding the introduction of the character, Ralph Macchio has stated that "in the '70s, it was quite an event to introduce a Hispanic super hero, and Hector Ayala, the White Tiger, was at the forefront." Upon release, the character served as inspiration for The Ibis writer Dave Schmidtt to reflect about the role of superheroes as a tool for the escapist, inherently being a figure with the power to change reality in ways that common people can't. Javier Hernández, cartoonist and co-founder of the Latino Comic Export, cites Hector Ayala as the first superhero that he identified with as a Latin American. Barbara F. Tobolowsky and Pauline J. Reynolds emphasize that the inclusion of Ayala and other characters in The Amazing Spider-Man made the publication more diverse, but that it still tapped into "fearful white stereotypes" when it came to protest storylines.

In 2016, Jon Huertas played Hector Ayala in an independent short film titled White Tiger, which was produced by WestSide Stories Productions. The actor noted that it is his "favorite Marvel character and the one I've always related to the most", arguing that the project was born from a necessity "for someone to develop an adult [Hispanic] male comic character". After working on Marvel's Voices, Older asserted that as the "first Latinx Super Hero, White Tiger holds such an integral and iconic status in comic book history" and commented on the importance of the introduction of Ayala by saying that it filled the void of children "growing up as [Latino nerds] not having people who looked like [them] on the page and [wondering] 'where are we?".

In retrospective, comic author and artist J. Gonzo considers White Tiger's introduction important as it marked the appearance of a complex Latin American character, but noted that in subsequent appearances Marvel pushed the character to the background and ultimately failed to truly bring him to the mainstream, a pattern that was repeated with other Hispanic superheroes. While discussing casting for characters within the Marvel Cinematic Universe following the success of Amazon Prime's The Lord of the Rings: The Rings of Power, Puerto Rican actor Ismael Cruz Córdova stated that the role of Hector Ayala is "the one that [he really] want[s] to do" for the studio. Considering the White Tiger a "character that's just fantastic" due to it being an "improbable her[o ...] in a journey of redemption" that mirror's the beginnings of his own life as a poor, bullied and marginalized young man.

=== Literary studies ===
In Teaching comics by and about Latinos/as, Frederick Luis Aldama places the introduction of the White Tiger as the moment where Latino superheroes were given more complex aspects to their characters. He also lists him among the Latin American superheroes that got "slipstreamed" as opposed to be pushed into the mainstream. In 2018, Marc DiPaolo argued a similar point, saying that Héctor Ayala began a trend of depicting them than just stereotypes, a pattern that continued during the 1970s. As part of an analysis in literary studies, Santiago Rubiano Velandia concludes that Ayala and other contemporaries are important for study, since they perpetuate the American stereotype that Latinos are predominantly devout Catholics.

The fourth chapter of All New, All Different?, "Guess Who's Coming to Save You? The Rise of the Ethnic Superhero in the 1960s and 1970s", by Allan W Austin and Patrick L Hamilton explores White Tiger's introduction within the context of superheroes of several cultural backgrounds. In Death Representations in Literature: Forms and Theories, Adriana Teodorescu uses the murder of his family as a case study to establish the vulnerability that superheroes face when their secret identities are exposed.

=== Sociological studies ===
As the first Latin American super hero to make it to the mainstream of American comics, the character of Ayala has been the focus of investigation concerning the representation of Hispanics in the media. One such example is Luis Saenz De Viguera Erkiaga's Tigre Blanco, héroe del Barrio!: Living and Dying Latina/o in a Superhero World, where the author examines the sociological context of Puerto Rican's in New York during the 1970s, how they were marginalized as a group and how Hollywood represented them as negative stereotypes. The characterization of Ayala before becoming White Tiger does not escape these clichés, as its internal monologue and vocal expressions are carried out bilingually and he is depicted as "passive" and "the useless son [of] hard working, humble Puerto Ricans [who] spends his time] loitering in dark alleys by himself."

Despite this, the tendency to speak in "Spanglish", a combination of broken Spanish (which did not accurately reflect Puerto Rican Spanish) and colloquial English, turned the character in a "pioneer for future Latina/o superheroes". Ultimately, Saenz considers this characterization as failing to accurately reflect the Nuyorican community and as problematic, since it tries to be "a positive representation of minorities, in spite of all these problems [thus reaffirming] hegemonic views on Puerto Ricans." He identifies the post-mortem depictions of the character as an attempt to turn this depiction to that of "a role model for Latina/o characters [and a] an honorable, inspirational figure" in an effort to veer away from the initial stereotype and re-imagine it from current standards. In A Choice of Weapons: The X-Men and the Metaphor for Approaches to Racial Inequality, Gregory S Parks, Matthew Hughey agree about the character's original depiction being a reflection of American stereotypes.

== In other media ==
- Hector Ayala / White Tiger appears in the Ultimate Spider-Man episode "Kraven the Hunter". This version is the second White Tiger and Ava Ayala's father who was killed by Kraven the Hunter years prior, leading to Ava adopting the White Tiger mantle.
- Hector Ayala / White Tiger appears in Daredevil: Born Again, portrayed by Kamar de los Reyes.
- Hector Ayala / White Tiger appears in Lego Marvel Avengers: Strange Tails, voiced by Kevin Andrew Rivera.

== Bibliography ==
- Aldama, Frederick Luis (2017). Latinx Superheroes in Mainstream Comics. University of Arizona Press.
- Cebulski, C.B., ed. (2024). Marvel Encyclopedia: New Edition. DK. ISBN 978-0-593-84611-7.
- Cowsill, Alan (2021). The Way of the Warrior: Marvel's Mightiest Martial Artists. DK. ISBN 978-0-7440-2719-8.
- Cowsill, Alan (2025). Daredevil: The First 60 Years. Titan Publishing Group. ISBN 978-1-78774-404-2.
