= White Tiger (comics) =

Marvel Comics characters

- Hector Ayala as White Tiger

Publication information
- Publisher: Marvel Comics
- First appearance: (Hector Ayala); Deadly Hands of Kung Fu #19 (December 1975) (Bengal tigress); Heroes for Hire #1 (July 1997) (Kevin Cole); Black Panther (vol. 3) #50 (October 2002) (Angela del Toro); Daredevil vol. 2 #58 (November 2003) (Ava Ayala); Avengers Academy #20 (December 2011)
- Created by: Bill Mantlo (writer); George Pérez (artist)

In-story information
- Alter ego: Hector Ayala; Kasper Cole; Angela del Toro; Ava Ayala
- Species: All: Human mutate
- Team affiliations: Sons of the Tiger; Defenders; Avengers Academy; Heroes for Hire; Mighty Avengers; New Avengers; S.H.I.E.L.D.
- Notable aliases: El Tigre Blanco
- Abilities: All: Superhuman strength, speed, agility, durability, stamina, and senses; Regenerative healing factor

White Tiger is the name of several superheroes appearing in American comic books published by Marvel Comics. The first incarnation of White Tiger, Hector Ayala, first appeared in Deadly Hands of Kung Fu #19 (December 1975). The second incarnation, an actual white Bengal tigress mutated into humanoid form, debuted in Heroes for Hire #1 (July 1997). The third incarnation, Kevin Cole, made his first appearance in Black Panther (vol. 3) #50 (October 2002). The fourth incarnation, Angela del Toro, made her debut in Daredevil vol. 2 #58 (November 2003). The fifth incarnation, Ava Ayala, was first featured in Avengers Academy #20 (December 2011).

== Fictional character biography ==
=== Hector Ayala ===
The first White Tiger (Hector Ayala) was created by writer Bill Mantlo and artist George Pérez.

Born in San Juan, Puerto Rico, the character can transform into the superhuman White Tiger through the power of the Jade Tiger amulets. In his alter-ego, Ayala fights foes such as the Corporation crime cartel and teams with heroes including Daredevil and Spider-Man. After years of fighting crime and nearly being killed, having his secret identity publicly exposed by the villainous Lightmaster and becoming psychologically and physically addicted to the tiger amulets, Ayala retires. But after a while, the call to don the amulets and fight evil becomes too strong and Hector once again becomes the White Tiger. Soon after, Hector is wrongly accused of murder and convicted despite the efforts of his lawyer, Matt Murdock (Daredevil). Ayala is shot and killed trying to escape, shortly before evidence emerges that belatedly proves his innocence.

=== White Tiger (Heroes for Hire) ===
The second White Tiger (an actual white Bengal tigress mutated into a woman of East Indian descent) was created by writer Roger Stern and artist Pascual Ferry.

The character is created by the High Evolutionary to hunt down an evil evolved wolf he had created, called the Man-Beast. White Tiger's bestial origins give her cat-like speed and reflexes, and she is highly skilled in martial arts. White Tiger meets Iron Fist, and intrigued by him, joins Heroes for Hire. White Tiger tries to keep her origins a secret, but during a training session with Iron Fist, she loses control and reverts to her tiger form. She is a valued member of the team, but finds that human emotions are more complex than her tiger mind can handle. She finds herself growing more and more attracted to Iron Fist. White Tiger attacks Misty Knight when she feels that Iron Fist is attracted to Misty, trying to display dominance to the encroaching female, just as a tigress would do in the wild. When White Tiger finally captures the rogue Man-Beast, she begs the High Evolutionary to remove her human persona, unable to bear the heartbreak of not being able to be with the man she loves. He concedes and turns her back into a white Bengal tiger, promising Iron Fist that he would return her to the rainforests where he found her.

=== Kasper Cole ===
The third White Tiger was Kevin "Kasper" Cole, created by writer Christopher Priest and artist Dan Fraga.

The character is a police officer of mixed Jewish/African-American heritage who impersonates Black Panther after finding T'Challa's costume. Advised by the Falcon that he needs to be more than just a man in a cat suit to achieve his goals, Kasper seeks permission to eat the heart-shaped herb and gain enhanced powers like T'Challa by undertaking the Rite of Ascension. The villainous Erik Killmonger offers him another option: a synthetic version of the heart-shaped herb and help finding Sal's son, in return for Kasper dropping the Black Panther identity, becoming a White Tiger of the Panther Cult, and doing a favor for Killmonger in the future. Kasper accepts, but then tracks down the boy using his newly enhanced senses and help from Queen Divine Justice and Everett Ross, thus lessening his debt to Killmonger. Afterwards, Kasper takes on the identity of the White Tiger. He continues to chase promotion, allied with The Crew (a team of inner city superheroes) against 66 Bridges and Triage.

The White Tiger wears a Vibranium-weave bulletproof costume. It can be cut only along the grain of the webbing, but cannot be punctured conventionally by blunt force. The boots have special Vibranium soles that absorb sound and impact, enabling him to leap off buildings up to eight stories tall and land without injury. He can also run up the sides of buildings and walk on water. The suit's claws are retractable, and contain a new composite of the experimental "anti-metal" Vibranium, which can break down other metal alloys.

=== Angela del Toro ===
The fourth White Tiger is Hector Ayala's niece, Angela del Toro, created by writer Brian Michael Bendis and artist Alex Maleev.

The character is an ex-FBI agent who works on the Daredevil case, and inherits her uncle's Jade Tiger amulets. Angela quits the FBI to understand the amulets and is trained in the use of their powers by Daredevil. Using the amulets' power to foil a robbery, she is touched by the overwhelming gratitude from the shopkeeper. Angela actually saves Daredevil from a crime lord and his bodyguard, using the amulets to give herself cat-like speed and fighting abilities. Realizing the powers she now possesses, she assumes her uncle's identity as the White Tiger. She is stabbed by Lady Bullseye and resurrected by the Hand, under their thrall until being healed by Black Tarantula. White Tiger received her own limited series in November 2006, written by Tamora Pierce. The Maker gives Angela an amulet from an alternate universe, which she uses to confront the fifth White Tiger, Ava Ayala. Ava is forsaken by her Tiger God, and Angela gains the combined power of the two Tiger Gods.

=== Ava Ayala ===
The fifth White Tiger is Ava Ayala, the youngest sister of Hector Ayala, created by writer Christos Gage and artist Tom Raney.

The character first appeared in Avengers Academy #20 (December 2011) and appeared as a regular character in the series through its final issue #39 (January 2013). She has appeared in the 2013 series Mighty Avengers. Ava also appeared in Ultimate Spider-Man, voiced by Caitlyn Taylor Love, where Ava is Hector's daughter instead of his sister.

== Collected editions ==
=== Angela del Toro ===
Title	Material collected	Publication date	ISBN
White Tiger: A Hero's Compulsion	White Tiger #1–6	September 26, 2007	9780785122739
