= White Tiger (Angela del Toro) =

- Angela del Toro as the White Tiger. Art by David Mack.

Publication information
- Publisher: Marvel Comics
- First appearance: Daredevil vol. 2 #58 (March 2004)
- Created by: Brian Michael Bendis (writer); Alex Maleev (artist)

In-story information
- Alter ego: Angela del Toro
- Species: Human mutate
- Team affiliations: New Revengers; The Hand; FBI
- Partnerships: Daredevil; Iron Fist
- Notable aliases: Agent Angela Del; Tigresa Blanca; White Tiger
- Abilities: Superhuman strength, speed, agility, durability, stamina, and senses; Regenerative healing factor; Experienced unarmed combatant; Expert markswoman; Trained investigator

Angela del Toro is a character appearing in American comic books published by Marvel Comics. Created by Brian Michael Bendis and Alex Maleev, the character first appeared in Daredevil vol. 2 #58 (March 2004). Angela del Toro is the fourth incarnation of White Tiger. She is the niece of Hector Ayala and Ava Ayala.

Angela del Toro / White Tiger appears in the Marvel Cinematic Universe television series Daredevil: Born Again (2025–present), played by Camila Rodriguez.

== Publication history ==
Angela del Toro debuted in the fifty-eight issue of the 1998 Daredevil series, created by writer Brian Michael Bendis and artist Alex Maleev. She later appeared in the 2006 White Tiger series, her first solo comic book series, by Tamora Pierce, Timothy Liebe, and Philippe Briones.

== Fictional character biography ==
Angela del Toro is the heir to a heroic legacy that began with the Jade Tiger, an enchanted statue from the kingdom of K'un-L'un. Broken into pieces, the statue's paws and head resurfaced in America, where the Sons of the Tiger wore them as amulets that enhanced their martial arts prowess. When the Sons disbanded, their discarded amulets were discovered by del Toro's uncle, the young Hector Ayala, who transformed into the superhuman White Tiger through their power. Going back into action as the White Tiger, Hector was framed for murder and convicted despite the efforts of his lawyer Matt Murdock. Hector was shot dead trying to escape, shortly before evidence emerged that proved his innocence.

Del Toro, a federal agent, volunteered to participate in the ongoing FBI investigation of the suspected Daredevil, Murdock. However, when Ayala's amulets were handed down to her, an overwhelmed del Toro asked Murdock to help her decide what to do with them. Knowing the terrible cost of the vigilante lifestyle — and having seen her own partner, agent Harold Driver, killed during the Daredevil investigation — del Toro wanted to know why anyone would ever play super-hero. She told Murdock she was willing to quit the FBI and abandon her case if he could answer her questions.

Recognizing del Toro's sincerity, Murdock challenges her to scale St. Catherine's Cathedral, then engages her in rooftop combat as Daredevil. Convinced of her ability, Murdock presents del Toro with a final lesson by leading her to a robbery in progress. Subduing the robbers single-handedly, del Toro is touched by the gratitude of the shopkeeper she had rescued. Shortly thereafter, del Toro rescued Murdock from ex-crime lord Alexander Bont and his reluctant henchman Gladiator.

During the start of her career as a masked crime-fighter, Del Toro uncovers a government ID smuggling plot by the Yakuza and a secret organization known as the Chaeyi, and starts work at 212 Security, a private bodyguard service. As White Tiger, she attempts to stop the activities of the two criminal organizations through various team-ups with fellow superheroes including Iron Fist, Luke Cage, Spider-Man, and Black Widow, often facing off against King Cobra and the Yakuza that killed her partner. After ending the relationship between the Yakuza and Chaeyi, the leader of Chaeyi vows to get revenge against White Tiger and enlists the help of Omega Red.

Del Toro is later killed by Lady Bullseye and resurrected as a Hand assassin (in the manner of Elektra Natchios). Later, she is cured of the Hand's black magic by Black Tarantula and joins Daredevil and Black Tarantula, working within the Hand as a leading member.

When New York is in crisis, White Tiger orders Black Tarantula to execute looters; he becomes confused and sees that something is wrong with Daredevil. White Tiger, still under the influence of the Hand, stabs Black Tarantula in the back, leaving him for dead. White Tiger is incarcerated after this, with her amulets being given to her aunt Ava Ayala.

Del Toro is freed from the Cellar by Maker of W.H.I.S.P.E.R., who gives her an alternate version of the White Tiger amulets from a parallel universe, restoring her powers. While in Rome, del Toro fights Ayala, resulting in Ayala's amulets suddenly reverting to del Toro. Afterwards, del Toro goes on to join Maker's New Revengers with approval from the Hand, who believe that Maker's plans would benefit them. During a fight with del Toro, Ayala manages to take the White Tiger amulets and destroy them, freeing del Toro from the control of the White Tigers and the Hand.

Guided by a vision of Hector, del Toro attends an activist meeting, which is raided by Roxxon agents. Del Toro defeats them with Ayala, who was also guided by Hector and had become a permanent host of the Tiger God, and the two reconcile.

== Powers and abilities ==
The White Tiger amulets augment Angela del Toro's strength, speed, stamina, agility, reflexes, reactions, coordination, balance, and endurance to superhuman levels. It also endow her with formidable martial arts skills. The amulets can enhance her recuperative powers. She has the ability to blend in with her surroundings, using the amulets to camouflage herself. Additionally, del Toro is a trained investigator, experienced with handling firearms and even unarmed combat.

== Reception ==
=== Critical response ===
Deirdre Kaye of Scary Mommy called Angela del Toro a "role model" and a "truly heroic" female character. Heather Marlette of Screen Rant included Angela del Toro in their "Marvel: 10 Incredible Latinx Characters" list.

== Other versions ==
An alternate universe version of Angela del Toro from Earth-58163 appears in House of M: Avengers #3. This version is a member of Luke Cage's underground human resistance movement against mutants who received her amulet by mail from Hector Ayala.

== In other media ==
- Angela del Toro / White Tiger appears in Daredevil: Born Again, portrayed by Camila Rodriguez.
- Angela del Toro / White Tiger appears as a playable character in Marvel Strike Force.

== Collected editions ==
Title	Material collected	Publication date	ISBN
White Tiger: A Hero's Compulsion	White Tiger #1-6	September 26, 2007	9780785122739
