= Maki Matsumoto =

Maki Matsumoto may refer to:

- Lady Bullseye (Maki Matsumoto), a Marvel Comics character
- Maki Matsumoto, a character in the anime television series Cardcaptor Sakura
- Maki Matsumoto (actress) (born 1973), Japanese actress
- Maki Matsumoto (announcer) (born 1996), Japanese television announcer
