= Philippe Briones =

French animator, author and comic book artist

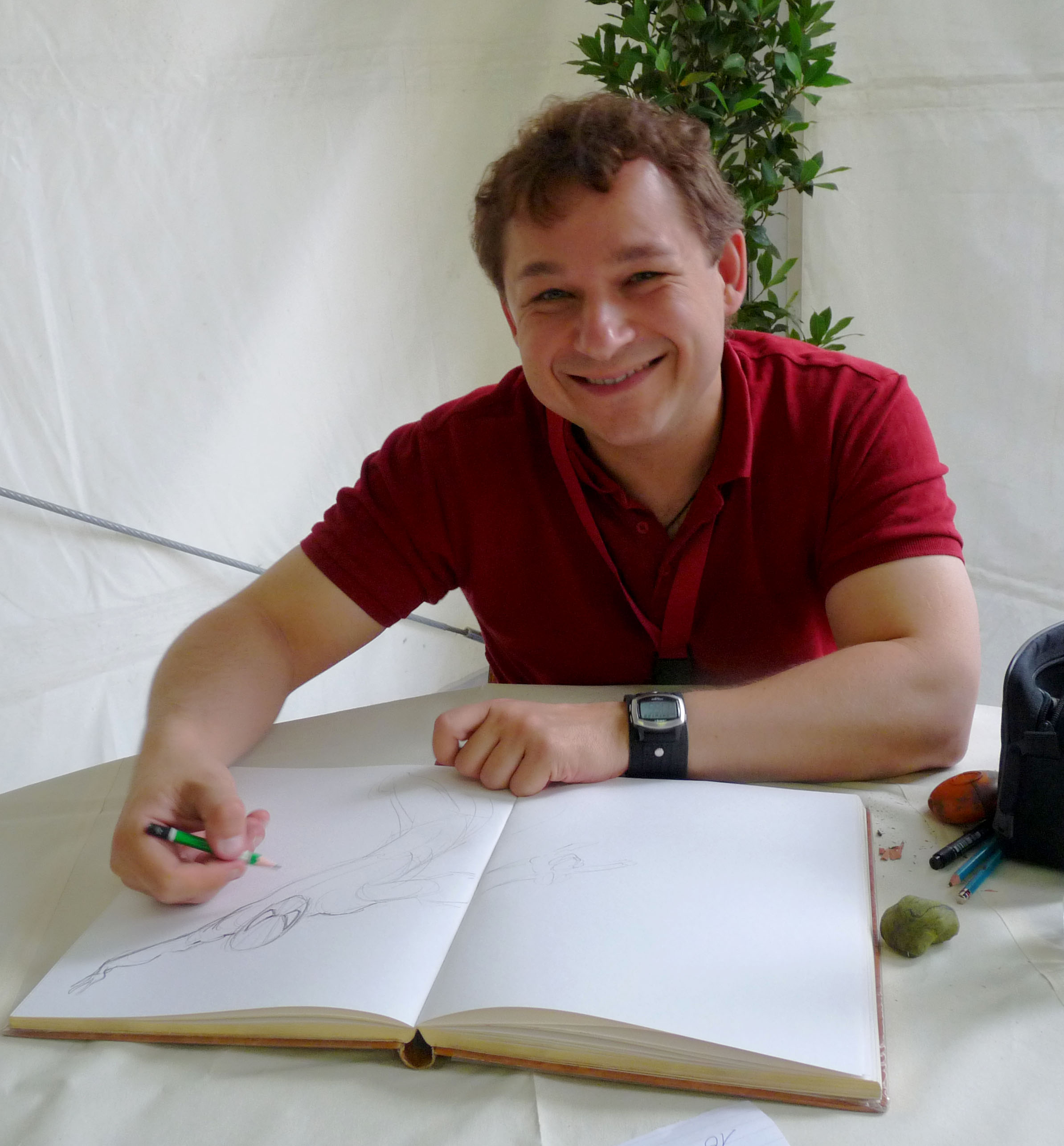

Philippe Briones is a French animator, author, and comic book artist.

== Biography ==
He studied at the École des beaux-arts de Beaune in Beaune, France, and at GOBELINS in Paris. After graduating he was recruited by Walt Disney Animation Studios, working on A Goofy Movie and continuing as a clean-up supervisor on Tarzan. In 2002, he worked on Les Seigneurs d'Agartha, Tales of the Dragon Guard, and Kookaburra for French publisher Soleil Productions.

He signed his first contract at Marvel Comics in 2006 for White Tiger, followed by work on Namor, Iron Man, Spider-Man, and X-Men until being approached by DC Comics in 2015 to illustrate Suicide Squad. He then worked on a Flash issue, and is now on the Aquaman Rebirth series.

While drawing for DC Comics, he continues to work with French publishers and other collaborators (Karate Boy, PSG Heroes). He illustrated and was co-scriptwriter on the Geek Agency series. In 2016, he illustrated 7 héros, published by Delcourt.

== Filmography ==
| Year | Title | Credits | Characters |
|---|---|---|---|
| 1995 | A Goofy Movie | Assistant Animator: Paris | |
| 1997 | Hercules | Key Assistant Animator | Titans and Cyclops |
| 1999 | Tarzan | Lead Key Assistant Animator | Tarzan |
| 2000 | Fantasia 2000 | Key Assistant Animator | |
| 2000 | The Emperor's New Groove | Key Assistant Animator | Kronk |
| 2001 | Atlantis: The Lost Empire | Additional Clean-Up Animator | |
| 2003 | The Jungle Book 2 | Additional Animation Production: Paris | |
| 2003 | Brother Bear | Additional Clean-Up Artist: Paris | |
| 2006 | The Little Matchgirl (Short) | Key Assistant Animator | |

== Bibliography ==
French Editors:

Soleil Productions

- (2001–2002): "Les Seigneurs d'Agartha" issues 1 & 2.
- (2002–2006): Tales of the Dragon Guard issues 2 et 4.
- (2004): Kookaburra Universe.
- (2015): PSG Heroes issues 1 & 2.

"Label Fusion" (Soleil/Panini).

- (2008): Wanderers : (On an original scenario by Chris Claremont).

Ankama.

- (2012): Karate boy.
- (2013): Geek Agency Tome 1 : Resident Geek : Original scenario by Philippe Briones and Romain Huet, drawing and inking by Philippe Briones, colors by Romain Huet.
- (2013): Geek Agency Tome 2 : Dragon Geek : Original scenario by Philippe Briones and Romain Huet, drawing and inking by Philippe Briones, colors by Romain Huet.

Delcourt.

- (2016): "7 Héros" ( Collection " 7 ", 3rd Season ).

American Editors :

Marvel Comics.

- (2006): White Tiger #1-5 : Drawing, inked by Don Hillsman.
- (2007): Namor #1-6 : #1-3 Drawing and inking, #4-6 Drawing, inked by Scott Hanna.
- (2008–2009): X-Men Legacy #216,219 et 225 : #216 Drawing, inked by Scott Hanna #219 inked by Cam Smith, #225 drawing and inking.
- (2009): Mrs Marvel #245.
- (2009): Iron Man vs Whiplash #1-4.
- (2010): American Son #1-4.
- (2010): Iron Man Legacy #10-11 : Drawing, inked by Jeff Huet.
- (2010): Web of Spider man #7 & 12
- (2011): Captain America Corps #1-5 : In collaboration with Roger Stern.
- (2013–2014): Uncanny X- Force #13-15
- (2015): X-Men #13-15,17.

DC Comics.

- (2015-2016): Suicide Squad #8-16.
- (2015): Suicide Squad Annual #1.
- (2016): Flash #49.
- (2016): Aquaman (Rebirth) #3-5.
