= Damon Dran =

- Damon Dran in Black Widow vol. 5 #6 (7 May 2014); Art by Phil Noto

Publication information
- Publisher: Marvel Comics
- First appearance: Daredevil #92 (Oct. 1972)
- Created by: Gene Colan (artist); Gerry Conway (writer)

In-story information
- Species: Human Cyborg
- Place of origin: Earth
- Notable aliases: Indestructible Man
- Abilities: Cyborg implants

Damon Dran is a fictional character appearing in American comic books published by Marvel Comics. An enemy of Black Widow and Daredevil, this character exists within the Marvel Universe. He was created by writer Gerry Conway and artist Gene Colan, first appearing in Daredevil #92 (Oct. 1972).

== Publication history ==
Dran debuted in a three-part story that took place in Daredevil #92-94 and went on to appear in Marvel Fanfare #11-13 and Captain America #429-430 before being killed off in Black Widow vol. 5, #4-6.

== Fictional character biography ==
An unscrupulous munitions magnate, Damon Dran became paranoid about his own mortality and secretly commissioned the creation of Project Four, a weapon that would imbue him with the power necessary to survive the "inevitable" World War III.

After Project Four was stolen by Black Widow and Danny French, Dran spent years trying to locate it. He eventually tracked both French and Black Widow down in San Francisco, where he had them captured and brought to his mansion in Berkeley. Dran was able to discern Project Four's location by subjecting French to a mind probe. While the device was being prepared for him, he sent Blue Talon and a brainwashed Black Widow against Black Widow's partner, Daredevil.

== Powers and abilities ==
The development of the Project Four device resulted in Dran obtaining superhuman strength and invulnerability, as well as the ability to increase his size and project energy beams from his hands. The extent of Dran's indestructibility is uncertain, though it enabled him to survive the destruction of his island by a S.H.I.E.L.D. Helicarrier. Notably, Dran's abilities appeared to eliminate his need for basic human necessities such as air, as he was unaffected by knockout gas.

Following the destruction of Project Four by Danny French, Dran temporarily lost his powers. However, he later regained his strength and invincibility, though these abilities eventually faded. In an attempt to replicate his former powers, Dran utilized cybernetic implants, which required stabilizers in the form of U.V. lights and special pills. Despite these efforts, the implants proved to be far less effective than Dran's previous abilities, as he was unable to withstand a corrosive gas attack.
