= Degenesis =

Tabletop role-playing game

- Logo used for the Rebirth edition
- Designers: Christian Günther; Marko Djurdjevic
- Publishers: SIXMOREVODKA
- Publication: 2004 Degenesis; 2014 DEGENESIS: Rebirth
- Years active: 2004–2021
- Genres: Post-apocalypse, Science fiction
- Systems: KatharSys
- Playing time: Varies
- Chance: Dice rolling
- Skills: Role-playing, improvisation
- Website: degenesis.com

DEGENESIS is a fictional setting created by Christian Günther and Marko Djurdjevic and that is currently published by SIXMOREVODKA. The only current product currently in existence set in DEGENESIS is a pen-and-paper role-playing game. DEGENESIS was created as an indie project, supported by Projekt Odyssee. It was originally produced and distributed in 2004 by Sighpress-Verlag. Since 2014, the second and current edition (DEGENESIS: Rebirth) was produced and distributed by SIXMOREVODKA. Since April 2020 all of its materials are available to download online for free. In October 2021 SIXMOREVODKA announced the end of the RPG product line. In June 2022, along with the relaunch of the company's website, new announcements were made including a teaser for an unspecified product named "The Clan Wars", which is a direct reference to events in the DEGENESIS lore, presumably resuming the development of products within the setting.

== Setting ==
The game is categorized by the designers as "Primal Punk", a description detailing a world in which humanity struggles for survival in a world filled with perils both alien and human.

The game is set in the regions of Europe and North Africa at the end of the 26th century, more than 500 years after a major asteroid event devastated the face of the Earth and the ensuing chaos and conflict reset human civilization, when it was just at the edge of transhumanism. From the ashes of the old world, new cultures emerge and fight for survival.

Furthermore, an alien entity travelled within the asteroids, and in its interaction with terrestrial lifeforms it pushes them to mutate and evolve. The Primer, as it is called, is a menace to the human species, for when it infects a human embryo it can turn it into something more primal: A Homo Degenesis.

Characters within the universe are shaped by three different ideals: culture, cult and concept. Culture is defined as the home region, the concept as the character's personal background theme and the cult as the player's team or organization. The story universe spans 13 different cults, which represent the major organizations within the world, and the Clanners, encompassing all the minor organizations which conform the majority of the world's population and allow for player customization.

== Rebirth edition ==

Noted points of departure from the first edition include the whole revamping of the game system, and lore-wise, a more lax and intertwined relationship between the cults.

=== System ===
The revamped Katharsys game system uses a d6 pool system where players roll a number of d6 equal to the sum of the relevant Attribute and the specific Skill, plus or minus circumstantial modifiers. Character's stats consist of 6 primary attributes - Body, Agility, Charisma, Intellect, Psyche, and Instinct - and each one of these has six specific skills. Primal and Focus, Faith and Willpower, Secondary stats and backgrounds.

Title	Publication Date	Type	Contents
Degenesis: Rebirth	October 2014	Core	Integral reworking of the game, the core book actually consists of two tomes: Primal Punk, which describes the setting in detail, and Katharsys, which provides information about the homonym game system and further advice for the Game Master, along with a prepared adventure.
In Thy Blood	October 2015	Source & adventure book	Contains detailed information about northern Purgare as well as the first adventure in the Jehammed's Trilogy campaign.
Game Screen	October 2015	Storytelling Screen	On the backside of the poster are tables for the game masters as well as a DIN A1 color copy of the playing world.
Degenesis: Sacrifice Everything	October 2015	Artbook	Rare artbook and collector's edition with illustrations by SIXMOREVODKA artists Marko Djurdjevic, Gerald Parel and Michal Ivan. An artistic interpretation of the November 2015's Degenesis trailer.
The Killing Game	July 2017	Source & adventure book	Describes in depth the region of the southern coast of Franka and contains the adventure that picks up and develops the trilogy campaign.
Clans of the Rhône	2017	DLC	Provides the description of the four major clans of southwestern Franka, along with ranks and specific rules to create characters of such clans.
Rising Ravens	2017	DLC	Expands information about the Apocalyptics in Bayonne.
Black Atlantic	May 2018	Source & Adventure Book	Enhances the information on northwestern Franka, and includes the conclusion of the Jehammed's trilogy campaign.
Degenesis: Artifacts	April 2020	Rules and equipment expansion	It expands the Katharsys game engine detailing topics such as Advanced Character Creation, Combat Maneuvers, Energy Management and Medical Complications, among others. Additionally it provides Game Masters and Players alike with a plethora of new gear.
Justitian	January 2021	Source book	Consisting of two books, one provides in-depth information about Justitian as well as other major settlements and cities of the Protectorate and the second brings a cast of more than 150 characters conforming the mayor players in the region, each one with a detailed description, statblock and several plot hooks. This book picks up after the conclusion of the events in Black Atlantic, moving the plot forward.

=== Free To Play ===
In April 2020 a revamped website and business model was announced, with all PDFs of the game's publications being available for free download indefinitely. A donation system was set up for fans to support the game via one-time or monthly subscriptions, and physical media, including the aforementioned books in print and other merchandise, are still available for purchase.

The website is the nexus for the game and under the new model it is updated regularly with new content that expands upon the lore of degenesis in the form of short stories, art, and character entries, among other types of media.

The Free To Play experiment failed to boost sales in any meaningful way. On October 22, 2021, the product line was brought to an end, and the project is no longer in active development. However, the community still makes active contributions to the project.

== First Edition ==

=== Rules ===
The gaming system is based on five Attributes (Mentality, Mobility, Body, Expression and Psyche). Players add Skill and Attributes to get the "Action Value" and rolls two 10-sided (2D10) die below it.

Difficulties are described by numbers the players must "beat".

Fighting is an expansion of the basic rules of the game by which the characters are "action points". The action points are modifiers within the game that either set initiative or other actions within the battle scenario. Players do damage by rolling a number of d10 under a specified number (defined by the weapon stats). There are also experience points that can be collected via battles or free experience points that can be freely distributed amongst the players.

Generally, however, players strive to roll as little as possible.

=== Publications and Special Editions ===
Title	Publication Date	Type	Contents
Degenesis	Winter 2004	Original Work	The original work lays the groundwork for the series with descriptions of all cultures and cults. All necessary background information about the game's world, history and citizens is described in detail. The gaming rules are also included
Eisbarriere	Fall 2005	Storytelling Screen	The playing screen displays all the important tables necessary for the game master. It is produced on a DIN A1 Format across Europe and northern Africa.
Justitian	Fall 2005	Background Series	The 204-page background series provides information about the Borcan metropolis and capital, Justitian, and its established Protectorate. Included are detailed city descriptions and over 100 NPCs
Fieldreport: Psychonauts	Summer 2006	Background Series	This 106-page background series provides detailed information about the Psychonaut Threats.
Cult Book: Spitalians	Spring 2008	Background Series	Full, detailed description of the Spitalian cult
Campaign Band: Nichtfraktal	Fall 2008	Campaign Band	Chroniclers describe the discovery of a legendary artifact, the Nichtfraktal (the Unfractured), after which thousands of people begin to search. The players have a new quest: to search for the artifact and discover its mysteries.

== Reception and awards ==
In a review of Degenesis in Black Gate, John ONeill said "The setting is marvelously imaginative and original, and there's a great deal about the system that appeals to me. [...] The Degenesis books are gorgeous, and the detailed maps and artwork within fire the imagination. They're printed in full cover and on heavy stock, and they absolutely command your attention." E.E. Knight also reviewed Degenesis for Black Gate and said that "you just might find yourself obsessing over it, as I have for some months now. Some of the ideas get stuck in your head, and I really want to throw this inspired madness-on-a-learning-curve at a group of players and see how they handle it. I think the character generation system will create a fully-formed personality that is memorable and exciting to play, whether you go for more the combat type, a smooth social facilitator, or a brainiac technology geek."

The Degenesis: Rebirth Edition was awarded the 2015 Special Jury Prize by the German Role-Playing Game Prizes (Deutschen Rollenspiel Preis (DRSP)).

== Reviews ==
- Casus Belli (v4, Issue 13 - Jan/Feb 2015)
