= List of Black Widow titles =

Black Widow is the name of two superheroes who have appeared in various titles published by Marvel Comics: Natasha Romanova and Yelena Belova. Natasha Romanova first appeared as a villain for Iron Man in Tales of Suspense #52 (1964). Over several appearances in The Avengers, she reformed and became a superhero. She then underwent a redesign to her modern incarnation in The Amazing Spider-Man #86 (1970). Yelena Belova first appeared in Inhumans #5 before her formal introduction as a rival for Natasha in the first Black Widow series.

== Titles ==
Titles feature Natasha as a main character unless otherwise noted. Series that feature both Natasha and Yelena as main characters are denoted by an asterisk (*), and series that only feature Yelena as a main character are denoted by a dagger (†). Team books such as The Avengers and The Champions are not included.

Title	Issues	Cover dates	Writer	Penciller	Description
Amazing Adventures	#1–8	August 1970 – September 1971	Various (Note: Gary Friedrich (#1–3); Mimi Gold (#4); Roy Thomas (#5–6, 8); Gerry Conway (#7))	Various (Note: John Buscema (#1–2); Gene Colan (#3–5); Don Heck (#6–8))	Amazing Adventures portrays Natasha as a jet setter who fought street crime and protected disaffected teenagers. This was the first series of solo stories for a female Marvel character. Stories about the Inhumans were published in the same issues.
Daredevil and the Black Widow	#92–107	October 1972 – January 1974	Various (Note: Gerry Conway (#92–96); Steve Gerber (#97–101, 103–107); Chris Claremont (#102))	Various (Note: Gene Colan (#92–98, 100); Sam Kweskin (#99); Rich Buckler (#101); Syd Shores (#102); Don Heck (#103–106); William Robert Brown (#107))	Natasha became a supporting character in Daredevil #81 (1971). Following criticism of her depiction as sexist, she was promoted to headlining character. Natasha was reverted to supporting character in Daredevil #108 (1974) and left the series in issue #124 (1975), occasionally returning for further periods as a supporting character of Daredevil.
Marvel Fanfare	#10–13	August 1983 – March 1984	Ralph Macchio	George Pérez	Marvel Fanfare featured Natasha in a four-issue story arc titled "Web of Intrigue" in which she looks for her chauffeur Ivan after he goes missing.
Black Widow: The Coldest War	N/A	April 1990	Gerry Conway	George Freeman	The Coldest War is the 61st of the Marvel Graphic Novels.
Punisher/Black Widow: Spinning Doomsday's Web	N/A	December 1992	D. G. Chichester	Larry Stroman	A one-shot co-starring Natasha and the Punisher
Daredevil/Black Widow: Abattoir	#1	July 1993	Jim Starlin	Joe Chiodo	A one-shot co-starring Natasha and Daredevil as they hunt two serial killers
Fury/Black Widow: Death Duty	#1	June 1995	Cefn Ridout	Charlie Adlard	Natasha works with Night Raven to investigate a criminal organization in Death Duty. Nick Fury does not play a major role in the story despite being a titular character.
Journey into Mystery	#517–519	February 1998 – April 1998	Scott Lobdell	Randall Green	A story arc in Journey into Mystery, "The Fire Next Time", featured Natasha.
Black Widow*	#1–3	June 1999 – August 1999	Devin Grayson	J. G. Jones	The Marvel Knights limited series, titled "The Itsy Bitsy Spider", has Natasha question her claim to the role of Black Widow when she is challenged by the younger spy Yelena as both track down a biotoxin. Grayson and Jones first introduced Yelena in Inhumans #5 to use her in this series.
Black Widow*	#1–3	January 2001 – March 2001	Devin Grayson and Greg Rucka	Scott Hampton	The second volume of Black Widow features Natasha and Yelena.
Black Widow: Pale Little Spider †	#1–3	June 2002 – August 2002	Greg Rucka	Igor Kordey	Pale Little Spider, published under the adults-only Max imprint, was the first solo series featuring Yelena.
Black Widow	#1–6	November 2004 – April 2005	Richard K. Morgan	Bill Sienkiewicz (#1–2, 5); Goran Parlov (#3–6)	The third volume of Black Widow encompasses the "Homecoming" story arc. Natasha returns to Russia while tracking enemy spies, and she learns that her past is a false memory. Morgan portrays Natasha as more violent and more willing to kill than other writers have.
Black Widow: The Things They Say About Her	#1–6	November 2005 – April 2006	Richard K. Morgan	Sean Phillips	The "Homecoming" story was followed by a direct sequel. In this series, Natasha goes into hiding as Nick Fury and Daredevil hunt her on behalf of S.H.I.E.L.D. Yelena appears as a supporting character in some issues.
Black Widow: Deadly Origin	#1–4	January 2010 – April 2010	Paul Cornell	Tom Raney; John Paul Leon	Deadly Origin tells Natasha's history through flashbacks, using the framing device of revisiting people from her past because she had spread nanites to them.
Black Widow & the Marvel Girls	#1–4	February 2010 – April 2010	Paul Tobin	Various (Note: Salva Espin (#1, 3); Jacopo Camagni (#2); Takeshi Miyazawa (#4))	This series pairs Natasha with a different female character each issue: Enchantress, the Wasp, Ms. Marvel, and Storm, respectively.
Black Widow	#1–8	June 2010 – January 2011	Marjorie Liu (#1–5); Duane Swierczynski (#6–8)	Daniel Acuña (#1–5); Manuel Garcia (#6–8)	The fourth volume of Black Widow features two story arcs. The first five issues by Liu and Acuña were titled "Name of the Rose". This continued the espionage-focused storytelling following the release of Iron Man 2. The latter three issues by Swierczynski and Garcia were titled "Kiss and Kill".
Widowmaker	#1–4	February 2011 – April 2011	Jim McCann (#1, 3); Duane Swierczynski (#2, 4)	David López (#1, 3); Manuel Garcia (#2, 4)	A continuation of both Black Widow and Hawkeye & Mockingbird, this series follows the three heroes as they search for a spy-killer using Hawkeye's old alias "Ronin".
Fear Itself: Black Widow	#1	August 2011	Cullen Bunn	Peter Nguyen	A one-shot was published as part of the Fear Itself event, featuring Natasha as she works with Peregrine on a mission in France. Besides this issue, Natasha does not play a significant role in the event overall.
Captain America and Black Widow	#636–640	November 2012 – February 2013	Cullen Bunn	Francesco Francavilla	Between Captain America #620 and #640, the series featured various heroes alongside Captain America and the title changed whenever a new character joined him. Captain America and Black Widow featured Captain America and Natasha as they encountered alternate universes.
Black Widow	#1–20	March 2014 – September 2015	Nathan Edmondson	Phil Noto	The fifth volume of Black Widow was published as part of the Marvel Now! branding. This series shifts away from the direct action back toward the character focus developed by Grayson in 1999.
Black Widow	#1–12	May 2016 – May 2017	Chris Samnee; Mark Waid	Chris Samnee	The sixth volume of Black Widow focuses on elements from the character's adaptation in the Marvel Cinematic Universe, placing emphasis on two elements familiar to the movie audience: S.H.I.E.L.D. and the Red Room.
Secret Empire: Uprising	#1	July 2017	Derek Landy	Joshua Cassara	Published as part of the Secret Empire event, this issue features Natasha training the Champions to be spies.
Infinity Countdown: Black Widow	#1	August 2018	Gerry Duggan	Nik Vierlla; Brent Schoonover	A one-shot featuring Natasha was published as part of the "Infinity Countdown" event. It features Natasha wielding the Space Stone.
Black Widow	#1–5	March 2019 – July 2019	Jen and Sylvia Soska	Flaviano Armentaro	The seventh volume of Black Widow features Natasha working with Tyger Tiger to shut down a live streamed torture facility in Madripoor.
Web of Black Widow	#1–5	November 2019 – March 2020	Jody Houser	Stephen Mooney	A five part limited series featuring Natasha
Black Widow*	#1–15	November 2020 – May 2022	Kelly Thompson	Various (Note: Elena Casagrande (#1–5, 7–10, 12, 14–15); Carlos Gómez (#4); Rafael De Latorre (#5–6, 8, 10–11); Rafael Pimentel (#13, 15))	The eighth volume of Black Widow consists of three major story arcs. "The Ties That Bind" in issues #1–5 has Natasha brainwashed into thinking she is an architect with a fiancé and son while her allies try to rescue her. "I Am the Black Widow" in issues #7–10 has her working alongside Yelena (as the White Widow), Anya Corazon, and Lucy Nguyen. "Die By the Blade" in #12–15 has the same team work with Hawkeye and the Winter Soldier to fight the Living Blade.
Black Widow: Widow's Sting	#1	December 2020	Ralph Macchio	Simone Buonfantino	The Widow's Sting one-shot features Natasha in a story with more traditional espionage tropes. It follows her as she fights against Silvermane.
Widowmakers: Red Guardian and Yelena Belova †	#1	January 2021	Devin Grayson	Michele Bandini	A one-shot featuring Yelena and Red Guardian
Black Widow Infinity Comic	#1	September 2021	Mark Russell	Ann Maulina	A one-shot featuring Natasha and Hawkeye
Wastelanders: Black Widow †	#1	March 2022	Steven S. DeKnight	Well-Bee	Five one-shot comics were published as an adaptation of the Marvel's Wastelanders podcast set in the post-apocalypse world of Old Man Logan. Wastelanders: Black Widow features an older version of Yelena.
White Widow †	#1–4	January 2024 – April 2024	Sarah Gailey	Alessandro Miracolo	A four part limited series featuring Yelena
Black Widow & Hawkeye	#1–4	May 2024 – August 2024	Stephanie Phillips	Paolo Villanelli	The "Broken Arrow" story arc features Natasha bonded with a symbiote alongside Hawkeye as they fight Damon Dran.
Black Widow: Venomous	#1	September 2024	Erica Schultz	Luciano Vecchio	A one-shot featuring Natasha bonded with a symbiote as a prologue to the Venom War story arc
Venom War: Venomous	#1–3	October 2024 – December 2024	Erica Schultz	Luciano Vecchio	Features Natasha and Anti-Venom (Flash Thompson)

== Tie-ins ==
Multiple tie-in comic books based on Black Widow adaptations have been published.

Title	Issues	Cover dates	Writer	Penciller	Description
Iron Man 2 - Black Widow: Agent of S.H.I.E.L.D.	#1	May 2010	Joe Casey	Matt Camp	Tie-in to the film Iron Man 2
Marvel's The Avengers: Black Widow Strikes	#1–3	July 2012 – August 2012	Fred Van Lente	Various (Note: Neil Edwards and Steve Kurth (#1); Ron Lim and Agustin Padilla (#2); Wellington Alves and Renato Arlem (#3))	Tie-in to the film The Avengers
Marvel's Black Widow Prelude	#1–2	March 2020 – April 2020	Peter David	Carlos Villa	Tie-in to the film Black Widow
Marvel's Avengers: Black Widow	#1	May 2020	Christos Gage	Michele Bandini	Tie-in to the video game Marvel's Avengers

== Collected editions ==
#	Title	Material Collected	Pages	Publication Date	ISBN
	Black Widow: The Sting of the Widow	Tales of Suspense #52, The Amazing Spider-Man #86, Amazing Adventures vol. 2 #1–8, and Daredevil #81		September 2, 2009	0-7851-3794-7
	Black Widow: Deadly Origin	Black Widow: Deadly Origin #1–4		March 17, 2010	0-7851-4301-7
	Black Widow: Web of Intrigue	Marvel Fanfare #10–13, Bizarre Adventures #25, and Black Widow: The Coldest War		April 7, 2010	0-7851-4474-9
	Black Widow & The Marvel Girls	Black Widow & The Marvel Girls #1-4		April 21, 2010	978-0785146995
	Hawkeye & Mockingbird / Black Widow: Widowmaker	Solo Avengers #16–18, Widowmaker #1–4		April 20, 2011	0-7851-5205-9
	Marvel's the Avengers: Black Widow Strikes	Marvel's the Avengers: Black Widow Strikes #1-3		September 19, 2012	978-0785165682
	Captain America and Black Widow	Captain America and Black Widow 636-640		February 26, 2013	978-0785165286
	Black Widow: Marvel Team-Up	Marvel Two-In-One (1974) 10; Marvel Team-Up (1972) 57, 82-85, 98, 140-141; and material from Marvel Comics Presents (1988) 53, 70, 93	208	March 24, 2020	978-1302922788
1	Black Widow Epic Collection: Beware the Black Widow	Tales Of Suspense (1959) 52-53, 57, 60, 64; Avengers (1963) 29-30, 36-37, 43-44; Amazing Spider-Man (1963) 86; Amazing Adventures (1970) 1-8; Daredevil (1964) 81; and material from Avengers (1963) 16, 32-33, 38-39, 41-42, 45-47, 57, 63-64, 76	408	February 25, 2020	978-1302921262
2	Black Widow Epic Collection: The Coldest War	Black Widow: The Coldest War (1990), Punisher/Black Widow: Spinning Doomsday's Web (1992), Daredevil/Black Widow: Abattoir (1993), Fury/Black Widow: Death Duty (1995) and Journey Into Mystery (1996) 517-519 and material from Bizarre Adventures (1981) 25, Marvel Fanfare (1982) 10-13, Solo Avengers (1987) 7, Marvel Comics Presents (1988) 135 & Daredevil Annual (1967) 10	480	October 20, 2020	978-1302921309
3	Black Widow Modern Era Epic Collection: Chaos	All-New Marvel NOW! Point One #1; Black Widow Vol. 5 (2014) #1-20; Punisher (2004) #9		March 2024	
	The Black Widow Strikes Omnibus	Tales of Suspense (1959) 52-53, 57, 60, 64; Avengers (1963) 29-30, 36-37, 43-44; Amazing Spider-Man (1963) 86; Amazing Adventures (1970) 1-8; Daredevil (1964) 81; Bizarre Adventures (1981) 25; Marvel Fanfare (1982) 10-13; Solo Avengers (1987) 7; Black Widow: Coldest War (1990); Punisher/Black Widow: Spinning Doomsday's Web (1992); Daredevil/Black Widow: Abattoir (1993); Marvel Comics Presents (1988) 135; Daredevil Annual (1967) 10; Fury/Black Widow: Death Duty (1995); Journey into Mystery (1951) 517-519; material from Avengers (1963) 16, 32- 33, 38-39, 41-42, 45-47, 57, 63-64, 76	896	September 15, 2020	978-1302921279
Volume 1 & 2
	Black Widow: The Itsy-Bitsy Spider	Black Widow vol. 1, #1–3; Black Widow vol. 2, #1–3		November 16, 2011	0-7851-5827-8
	Marvel Knights Black Widow by Grayson & Rucka: The Complete Collection	Black Widow vol. 1, #1–3; Black Widow vol. 2, #1–3; Black Widow: Pale Little Spider #1-3		October 23, 2018	978-1302914004
Volume 3
1	Black Widow: Homecoming	Black Widow vol. 3, #1–6		May 11, 2005	0-7851-1493-9
2	Black Widow: The Things They Say About Her	Black Widow 2 vol. 3, #1–6		June 7, 2006	0-7851-1768-7
	Black Widow: Welcome to the Game	Black Widow vol. 3, #1–6; Black Widow: The Things They Say About Her #1-6	288	January 21, 2020	978-1302921255
Volume 4
1	Black Widow: The Name of the Rose	Black Widow vol. 4 #1–5 and material from Enter the Heroic Age one-shot	140	January 5, 2011	0-7851-4354-8
2	Black Widow: Kiss or Kill	Black Widow vol. 4 #6–8 and material from Iron Man: Kiss and Kill one-shot	124	August 10, 2011	0-7851-4701-2
	Black Widow: Widowmaker	Black Widow: Deadly Origin (2009) 1-4, Black Widow (2010) 1-8, Widowmaker (2010) 1-4, Fear Itself: Black Widow (2011) 1, Black Widow Saga (2010) 1; and material from Enter The Heroic Age (2010) 1, Iron Man: Kiss And Kill (2010) 1	464	February 11, 2020	978-1302921446
Volume 5
1	The Finely Woven Thread	Black Widow Vol. 5 #1-6, All-New Marvel Now! Point One	144	July 29, 2014	978-0785188193
2	The Tightly Tangled Web	Black Widow Vol. 5 #7-12, The Punisher (2014) #9	160	February 3, 2015	978-0785188209
3	Last Days	Black Widow Vol. 5 #13-20	176	October 13, 2015	0785192530
Volume 6
1	SHIELD's Most Wanted	Black Widow Vol. 6 #1-6	136	November 8, 2016	978-0785199755
2	No More Secrets	Black Widow Vol. 6 #7-12	136	May 9, 2017	978-0785199762
	Black Widow by Waid & Samnee: The Complete Collection	Black Widow Vol. 6 #1-12	272	March 17, 2020	978-1302921293
Volume 7
	Black Widow: No Restraints Play	Black Widow Vol. 7 #1-5	112	July 30, 2019	978-1302916732
Web of Black Widow
	Black Widow: The Web of Black Widow	The Web of Black Widow #1-5	112	March 3, 2020	978-1302920074
Volume 8
1	The Ties That Bind	Black Widow Vol. 8 #1-5	112	May 4, 2021	978-1302924836
2	I Am The Black Widow	Black Widow Vol. 8 #6-10	112	October 26, 2021	978-1302930134
3	Die By The Blade	Black Widow Vol. 8 #11-15	112	May 22, 2022	978-1302932541
	Black Widow by Kelly Thompson	Black Widow Vol. 8 #1-15	336	June 11, 2024	978-1302952662

== See also ==
- List of Avengers titles
- List of Daredevil titles
