= Marko Djurdjević =

German illustrator

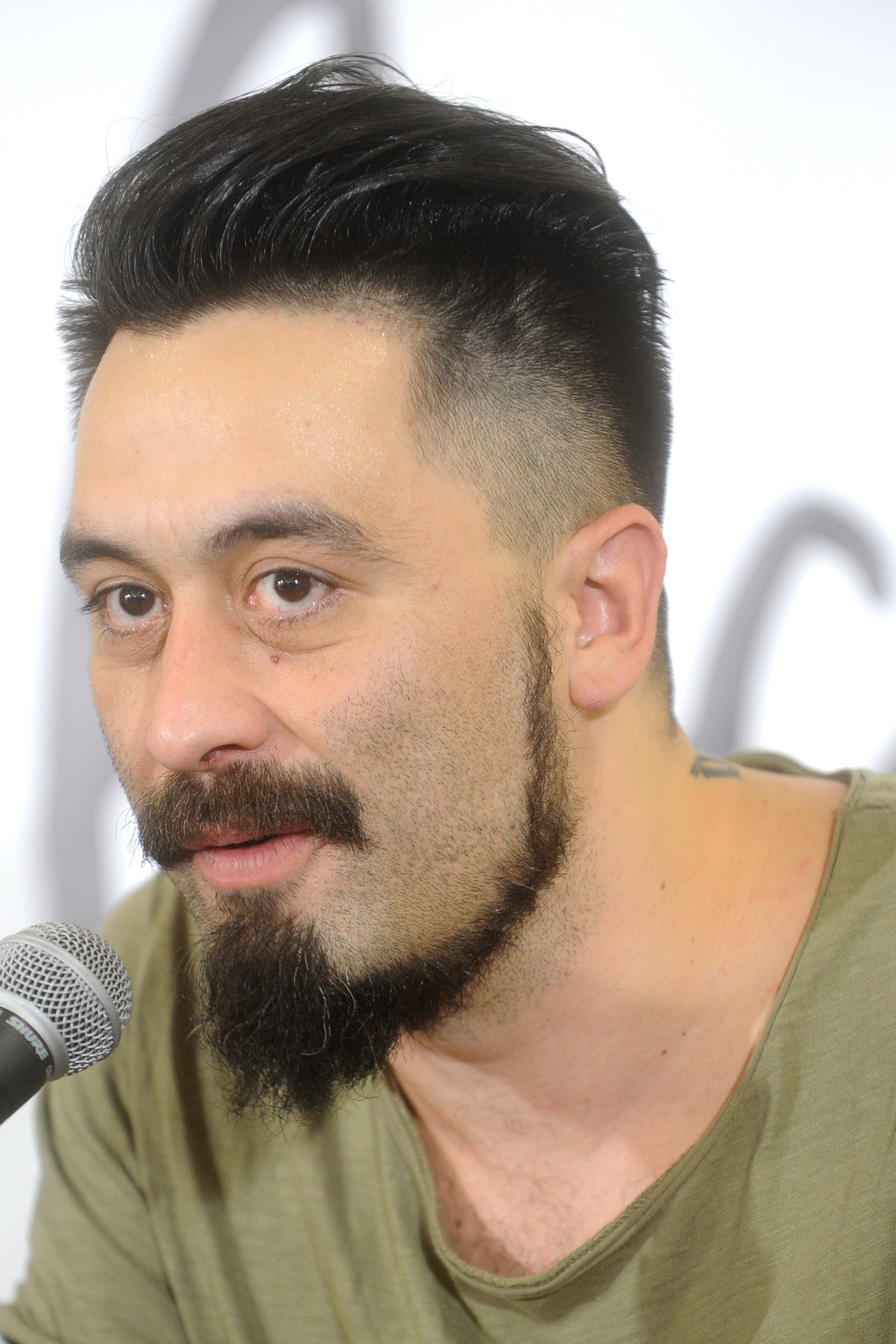
- Marko Djurdjević at Lucca Comics & Games 2016
- Born: January 23, 1979 (age 47) Koblenz, West Germany
- Areas: Penciller, Concept artist

Marko Djurdjević (born January 23, 1979) is a German illustrator and concept artist of Serbian descent, best known for his character designs. He works for Marvel Comics, and has produced a large body of cover art, as well as promotional designs, character concepts, and interior artwork. He lives in Berlin with his wife, Jelena Kevic Djurdjevic, who is also an artist and illustrator.

== Early life and work ==
Djurdjević was born in Koblenz, West Germany. As a child, he exhibited a talent for drawing, inspired by cartoons such as He-Man. When Marko was 11, he discovered Burne Hogarth's book Dynamic Anatomy (1958), a major turning point in his self-education. Studying the guide for two years, Djurdjević then put the book away and added a layer of realism to his drawings. He used what he learned from Hogarth as a foundation, while pulling ideas from his everyday life observations.

As a teenager, Djurdjevic became influenced by American comic books such as Spider-Man, a foreshadowing of his later career as a Marvel Comics illustrator. He rejected the comic style of drawing a couple of years later, citing it as "too stylized" and "exaggerated", which was contrary to his training early on. At 17, Marko began working professionally as an illustrator. He has mostly produced black and white drawings for tabletop role-playing game companies such as White Wolf, Inc. and FanPro Games.

== Conceptart.org, Massive Black, and Degenesis ==
Djurdjević continued working in Germany as an illustrator for the next few years, building upon his personal style, which took on an almost sketch-like quality while retaining anatomical accuracy. He was convinced by a friend to post some of his designs and pictures on a relatively new online art community called conceptart.org. He gained immediate recognition for his ability to conjure extremely believable figures from his imagination in a short amount of time. Djurdjević's popularity was noticed by the founding members of conceptart.org, Jason Manley and Andrew Jones. The two had been creating a network of friends through their website and were forming a company devoted to producing concept art for video game companies and the film industry. Djurdjević was offered a position in the group as a senior concept artist, focusing on human character and creature design. He accepted and became one of the original members of the company, now known as Massive Black.

Massive Black started off as a group of professionals who collaborated over the internet. As more projects developed, the company was forced to create a physical headquarters in San Francisco, California. Djurdjević left his home country and moved to the United States, where he lived for the next 3½ years. During this time, the conceptart.org community leaders and professional instructors held workshops in various locations, intending to teach fledgling artists directly. This served as a way of connecting with the artistic community that the website had formed on a more intimate level.

In 2004, Djurdjević was contacted by Christian Gunther to work on a post-apocalyptic themed RPG known as Degenesis. Gunther had previously released the game in 2001, but it received little attention. Gunther hoped that a revision of the game, along with a strong artistic direction, would give the game a larger audience. Djurdjević was commissioned to design most of the game's look, as well as the bulk of its interior artwork and character designs. This project allowed Djurdjević to showcase his ability to create original, yet believable, worlds on a large scale. He quickly became associated with the style of the characters in the game, with their asymmetrical designs, horrific themes, and focus on gesture. Marko often stated that the post-apocalyptic genre was his favorite genre to work in.

== X-Men Re-designs, Character Ideation, and Marvel ==
Example of Djurdjević's work, from the cover of Amazing Spider-Man #642.

Djurdjević continued to work in California as a concept artist for the next years. The founders of the conceptart.org website started developing tutorial DVDs that could be sold to the public. Around this time, Djurdjević (at the urging of his friend Nic Klein), re-created 18 characters of the X-Men. The characters were eventually discovered by an editor working at Marvel Comics, and they contacted Djurdjević and offered him an exclusive contract to produce illustrations for some of their title's covers. He accepted the offer after producing a test cover for the series X-23.

At the end of 2006, Massive Black released the DVD Character Ideation.

== Bibliography ==
Painted comics cover art (except where noted) includes:

=== Marvel ===
- Amazing Spider-Man #544-545, 573, 642-643 (2007–10)
- Avengers Academy #1 (2010)
- Avengers: The Children Crusade #1 (2010)
- Black Panther, vol. 4, #1 (2009)
- Blade #1, 4-5 (2006–07)
- Cable, vol. 2, #4, 21-24 (2008–10)
- Captain America #601, 606-609 (2009–10)
- Daredevil, #500 (2009)
- Daredevil, vol. 2, #95-119, Annual #1 (2007–09)
- Daredevil: Blood of the Tarantula, one-shot (2008)
- Daredevil: Lady Bullseye, one-shot (2009)
- Dark Avengers #1 (2009)
- Dark Reign:
  - Fantastic Four (2009)
  - The Hood, miniseries, #1-5 (2009)
  - The List - Avengers (cover and interior art) (2009)
- Dark Wolverine #75 (2009)
- Doctor Voodoo: Avenger of the Supernatural (2009)
- Hawkeye & Mockingbird, miniseries, #1-4 (2010)
- Marvel Boy: The Uranian, miniseries, #1-3 (2010)
- Mighty Avengers #9, 11
- Thor #600-603, Giant-Size Finale #1 (covers and interior pencil art) (2009-10)
- Thor: Ages of Thunder, miniseries, #1 (2010)
- Thor: Man of War (2010)
- Thor: Reign of Blood (2008)
- Thor, vol. 3, #7-8 (interior pencil art)
- Thunderbolts #110-121, 144-147 (2007-10)
- Ultimate Captain America Annual #1 (interior pencil art) (2008)
- Ultimate Hulk Annual #1 (interior pencil art) (2008)
- Ultimate Fallout, miniseries, #1-6 (variants) (2011-)
- What If: Civil War (interior pencil art, 2-pages only) (2008)
- Wolverine, vol. 2, #73 (2009)
- Wolverine: Origins #13-19 (2007-08)
- Wolverine: Weapon X #2 (2009)
- Secret Avengers #1 art (2010)
