= White Tiger (Ava Ayala) =

Marvel Comics superhero

- Ava Ayala (right) and Julie Power (left) as depicted in Avengers Academy #24 (January 2012). Art by Rodin Esquejo.

Publication information
- Publisher: Marvel Comics
- First appearance: Avengers Academy #20 (December 2011)
- Created by: Christos Gage; Tom Raney

In-story information
- Alter ego: Ava Ayala
- Species: Human mutate
- Team affiliations: Daughters of Liberty; Avengers Academy; Mighty Avengers; Heroes for Hire; S.H.I.E.L.D.
- Notable aliases: White Tiger
- Abilities: Superhuman strength, speed, agility, durability, stamina, and senses; Regenerative healing factor; Razor sharp claws; Energy generation and projection

White Tiger (Ava Ayala) is a superheroine appearing in American comic books published by Marvel Comics. Created by Christos Gage and Tom Raney, the character first appeared in Avengers Academy issue #20 (December 2011). Ava Ayala is the fifth incarnation of White Tiger. She is the younger sister of Hector Ayala as well as the aunt of Angela del Toro. The character has also been a member of the Mighty Avengers and the New Avengers at various points in her history.

== Publication history ==
Ava Ayala debuted in the twentieth issue of the 2010 Avengers Academy series, and was created by writer Christos Gage and artist Tom Raney. She later appeared in the 2013 Mighty Avengers, by Al Ewing. She appeared in the 2015 New Avengers series, by Al Ewing. She appeared in the 2021 and 2022 Marvel's Voices: Comunidades anthology series. In 2025, Ava and the other White Tigers starred in the one-shot White Tiger Reborn, which was written by Daniel José Older and Cynthia Pelayo and illustrated by Bruno Abdias and Moises Hidalgo.

== Fictional character biography ==
Ava, the fifth White Tiger, is the sister of Hector Ayala and a student enrolled in the Avengers Academy. She inherited the White Tiger amulet from her brother following the death of her family members at the hands of Gideon Mace. Upon her introduction, Ava states the White Tiger is a family legacy that she intends to honor.

During the Infinity storyline, White Tiger and Heroes for Hire thwart Plunderer's plan to steal robot parts. When the Superior Spider-Man (Doctor Octopus' mind in Spider-Man's body) stops Plunderer and considers the Heroes for Hire team as mercenaries, White Tiger quits the team and joins the Mighty Avengers.

During the Inhumanity storyline, White Tiger bonds with Power Man and the two discover that they can combine their abilities to form a White Tiger Chi. White Tiger attempts to avenge her parents by killing Gideon Mace, but the rest of the Mighty Avengers stop her from doing so.

During the Secret Wars storyline, White Tiger attempts to reconcile with her surviving family members. They are angered that she has chosen a violent lifestyle and threaten to kill her if she does not leave.

In the All-New, All-Different Marvel event, White Tiger joins Sunspot's incarnation of the New Avengers.

Ava later battles her niece Angela del Toro in Rome, during which their respective tiger gods and amulets merge. During the New Revengers' attack on the New Avengers at Avengers Base Two, Ava battles Angela again, destroys her amulet, and frees her from the Tiger God's influence. The two later help the New Avengers defeat the New Revengers and a rogue S.H.I.E.L.D. agent who was hunting A.I.M. After defeating a rogue A.I.M. group, Ava and Angela discuss their future, with Ava wondering who the Tiger God will choose to be the next White Tiger.

While attempting to reconnect with the Tiger God, Ava is visited by Hector's ghost, who appears to her in agony. Ava believes that there is more to their parents' murder and returns to their place of death to investigate, believing that it would put Hector's ghost to rest. However, D'Spayre reveals himself to be controlling Hector and uses Hector's and Ava's combined grief to take a physical form. Without the amulets' power, Ava is nearly overwhelmed by D'Spayre, but finds herself in the Tiger God's realm and reunites with the freed Hector. The Tiger God makes Ava his permanent host, restoring her lost powers while imbuing her with additional ones, giving her enough strength to destroy D'Spayre.

In Deadly Hands of K'un-Lun, Ava joins the Iron Fist Lin Lie in his efforts to stop his brother Lin Feng from reviving the god Chiyou. After the conflict is resolved, Ava learns that the White Tiger amulet originated in K'un-L'un.

== Powers and abilities ==
The White Tiger amulet augments Ava Ayala's physical abilities to superhuman levels. She also possesses sharp claws and is trained in martial arts. Ava later became the permanent host of the Tiger God, augmenting her powers. She also gained the ability to generate a mystical green aura which she can use to enhance her attacks, particularly infusing it into her claws.

== Reception ==
=== Critical response ===
Adam Barnhardt of ComicBook.com called Ava Ayala a "fan-favorite Avengers character," writing, "While mystical at heart, White Tiger has often found herself as one of the street-level characters Marvel fans have long hoped to see in live-action." Evan Lewis of MovieWeb ranked Ava Ayala 6th in their "10 Female Characters the MCU Should Introduce in Future Phases" list, saying, "She would be refreshing and bring something new to the table." Megan Nicole O'Brien of Comic Book Resources ranked Ava Ayala 8th in their "Every Member Of The Daughters Of Liberty" list, Daniel Kurland while ranked her 15th in their "15 Obscure Marvel Characters Who Deserve Their Own Movie" list. Jack Walters of Screen Rant called Ava Ayala the "White Tiger that most Marvel fans know and love from the comics."

== In other media ==
=== Television ===
- Ava Ayala / White Tiger appears in Ultimate Spider-Man, voiced by Caitlyn Taylor Love. This version is a member of S.H.I.E.L.D.'s training program for teenage superheroes along with Spider-Man, Iron Fist, Power Man, and Nova. Additionally, she has history with Kraven the Hunter, who killed her grandfather and father, both previous White Tigers, for their familial amulet, which she inherited. However, her powers also have the risk of making her more aggressive and cat-like, which she constantly works to suppress. In the third season, she joins the New Warriors.
  - A vampiric alternate universe variant of Ava appears in the episode "Return to the Spider-Verse", voiced by Cree Summer.
- Ava Ayala / White Tiger appears in Spidey and His Amazing Friends, voiced by Kylie Cantrall. This version can communicate with animals.

=== Video games ===
- Ava Ayala / White Tiger, based on the Ultimate Spider-Man incarnation, appears in Disney Infinity 2.0 and Disney Infinity 3.0, voiced by Courtnee Draper.
- Ava Ayala / White Tiger appears in Marvel: War of Heroes.
- Ava Ayala / White Tiger appears as a playable character in Lego Marvel's Avengers, voiced again by Caitlyn Taylor Love.
- Ava Ayala / White Tiger appears as a playable character in Marvel Future Fight.
- Ava Ayala / White Tiger appears in Marvel: Avengers Alliance.
- Ava Ayala / White Tiger appears as a playable character in Lego Marvel Super Heroes 2, voiced by Skye Bennett.
- Ava Ayala / White Tiger appears in Marvel Snap.
