= Machinesmith =

Marvel Comics fictional character

- Machinesmith. Art by Paco Medina.

Publication information
- Publisher: Marvel Comics
- First appearance: Daredevil #49 (Feb. 1969; as Starr Saxon); Daredevil #54 (July 1969; as Mister Fear); Marvel Two-in-One #47 (Jan. 1979; as Machinesmith)
- Created by: Stan Lee (writer); Gene Colan (artist)

In-story information
- Alter ego: Samuel "Starr" Saxon
- Team affiliations: A.I. Army; Masters of Evil; Skeleton Crew
- Notable aliases: Mister Fear
- Abilities: Scientific and robotic genius Robotic Suits; Ability to transfer mind into other machines Technoforming; Self-spawning; Organism/A.I. Synergy; Multiple bodies

Machinesmith (Samuel "Starr" Saxon) is a supervillain appearing in American comic books published by Marvel Comics, most notably as a regular enemy of Captain America. He specializes in robotics, and is able to make convincing robotic doubles of other superhumans. His own mind was ultimately transferred to a robotic body.

== Publication history ==
The character first appeared in Daredevil #49 (Feb. 1969), and briefly appeared as a character using the Mister Fear identity shortly thereafter in Daredevil #54 (July 1969). The character first appeared as Machinesmith in Marvel Two-in-One #47 (Jan. 1979).

His robotic features looked nothing like his human ones, and it was not established until later in Captain America #249 (Sept. 1980) that Machinesmith and Starr Saxon are the same character. Barry Windsor-Smith has stated that the character was supposed to be presented as gay in Daredevil #50; however, the early art was not good enough to get the point across. Other issues have since revealed the character's sexuality more directly, such as Captain America #368 and Iron Man #320.

== Fictional character biography ==
Starr Saxon was born in Memphis, Tennessee, but his family was living in Queens, New York, by his teenage years. At 14 years old, he discovered an abandoned Doombot in a NYC subway tunnel, and snuck the robot home piece by piece to deconstruct to learn robotics. His original efforts saw to his use of robotics and engineering abilities to be a professional criminal robot maker and construct a variety of androids to be used as assassins for hire/personal gain. At some point during this period, he constructs a facsimile of Magneto and a variety of drones who went on to battle the X-Men. Magneto's robot appears several times over the years, believing itself to be the true Magneto until being destroyed by a Sentinel.

In his first actual appearance, Saxon is hired by Biggie Benson to kill Daredevil. Saxon dispatches a powerful android to do so, and to commit a series of crimes in New York. He discovers Daredevil's secret identity, and kidnaps Karen Page (Daredevil's girlfriend). He blackmails Daredevil into allowing him to escape. Deciding to confront Daredevil directly, Saxon murders Zoltan Drago and steals the man's costume and weaponry. As "Mister Fear", he challenges Daredevil to a public duel in New York City. He rigs Daredevil's billy club to release fear-gas pellets, and begins a crime spree. However, Saxon battles Daredevil and loses, breaking his neck in a fall from a flying hovercraft platform.

Saxon's robots find his dying body and transfer his consciousness into a computer, from which he can control a variety of android bodies. Now calling himself the "Machinesmith", he is hired by the Corporation agent Carnation to defeat the Fantastic Four, but is unsuccessful.

When Captain America and Nick Fury have an encounter with Baron Strucker, Captain America defeats Strucker, who is revealed to be a robot controlled remotely by Machinesmith to destroy Captain America. He comes to despise his artificial life, but his programming prevents him from committing suicide.

Machinesmith is hired into the Red Skull's exclusive employ, for whom he served as his primary scientist/machinist and member of the Skeleton Crew. When the Red Skull is blasted apart by Kubekult's Cosmic Cube destruction, Machinesmith attempts to enact a series of protocols dictated by the Red Skull to kill Captain America and create a nuclear holocaust, but is thwarted.

Later, Machinesmith is employed by the Crimson Cowl's Masters of Evil. After the team's defeat by the Thunderbolts, Machinesmith has since lain low.

Machinesmith later appears in Madripoor, having captured Captain America and deactivated the Super Soldier Serum in his foe's body. It was Machinesmith's intent to reverse-engineer the Super Soldier Serum to sell to various military officials. Captain America is able to regain the enhanced physique and defeats Machinesmith.

Machinesmith is later paroled after helping the U.S. government hack into Latveria's computer network. He moves to Miami and gets a menial job performing at children's birthday parties, before he is asked by Grizzly to help Scott Lang with Cassie Lang's rescue from Cross Technological Enterprises. Machinesmith agrees on the condition that Lang gets him a job at Ant-Man Security Solutions as stable employment will help keep his parole officer off his back.

Saxon turns his attention towards attacking a tech symposium in Nagayo, Japan; held in honor of King T'Challa and students of Wakanda's illustrious science academy by advocates of professor Takumi Ito and his protege's amongst the Takumi Masters. Tech geniuses whose invention they call the Shareware, which pools the collective consciousness and thoughtscape of everyone plugged into it at the symposium via the cyber world. Machinesmith seeks to use the Shareware to gain access to Wakanda's data processing center and spread a biotechnical plague across the world.

During the "Iron Man 2020" event, Machinesmith appears as a member of the A.I. Army, an alliance of robots who seek to achieve equal rights to organic life.

== Powers and equipment ==
Starr Saxon originally had a genius intellect, but no superhuman powers. He is one of the most gifted robot designers in the world, and has vast experience in cybernetic and bionics.

After breaking his neck, his consciousness began to occupy a robot duplicate of himself, programmed with his complete brain patterns, and capable of self-motivated, creative activity. His robotic materials, design and construction provided him with a number of superhuman capacities, including superhuman strength, speed, stamina, durability, agility and reflexes.

Machinesmith exists as a living, cybernetic-system program (artificial consciousness), which can possess and reshape technology at will. Machinesmith can even place his mind into multiple bodies at the same time, though the number of complex motions he can make his automata perform simultaneously is limited. Saxon can even use his mind transference abilities to siphon information from digitized mainframes and store them elsewhere for later use, even being able to steal sensitive data from organic minds, but this leaves him disoriented and he does not do so very often.

His physical properties vary in accordance with the robot form he is inside. Certain robots possess superhuman capacities such as telescopic arms and legs, explosive launchers, and infrared or telescopic eyes. Machinesmith has created a vast arsenal of weaponry, defense systems, and surveillance devices, whose specifications are constantly upgraded.
