= Mister Fear =

Marvel Comics fictional characters

Mister Fear is the name of four supervillains appearing in American comic books published by Marvel Comics. The character is often depicted as an antagonist to the hero Daredevil.

== Publication history ==
Mister Fear is the identity of multiple supervillains who use a special 'fear gas' fired from a gas pellet gun; the original version (Zoltan Drago) first appeared in Daredevil #6 (February 1965) and was created by Stan Lee and Wally Wood.

Starr Saxon first appeared as the second version in Daredevil #54 (July 1969).

The third version (Larry Cranston) first appeared in Daredevil #88 (June 1972) and was created by Gerry Conway and Gene Colan.

The fourth version (Alan Fagan) first appeared in Marvel Team-Up #92 (April 1980) and was created by Steven Grant and Carmine Infantino.

== Fictional character biographies ==
=== Zoltan Drago ===
Mister Fear

Publication information
- Publisher: Marvel Comics
- First appearance: Daredevil #6 (February 1965)
- Created by: Stan Lee; Wally Wood

In-story information
- Alter ego: Zoltan Drago
- Team affiliations: Fellowship of Fear
- Partnerships: Lucia von Bardas
- Abilities: Accomplished wax sculptor Talented amateur chemist Gifted intellect Fear pheromone administered primarily by gas pellets, occasionally by syringe, most recently by an aerosol sprayer

Zoltan Drago is the proprietor of a financially ailing wax museum who attempted to use his knowledge of chemistry to create an elixir which would turn his wax statues into living creatures, with which he would create a private army. The chemical fails to create life in wax, but Drago discovered that it can evoke fear when inhaled. He designs a frightening costume for himself as the Mister Fear persona.

As the original Mister Fear, Drago uses his fear-gas to enslave Ox and Eel. Naming his triumvirate as the Fellowship of Fear, he is soundly defeated by Daredevil and imprisoned. Drago is later killed by Starr Saxon, who takes his equipment.

=== Starr Saxon ===
Criminal engineer Samuel "Starr" Saxon desired the means to confront Daredevil directly. Saxon kills Zolton Drago, steals his Mister Fear gear, then assumes the identity himself. As Mister Fear, Saxon humiliates Daredevil in televised battles, casting himself as the hero in a series of charity-funding battles. In the final battle with Daredevil, Saxon is unmasked and falls to his death. Following his death, Saxon's mind is transferred to a robotic body.

=== Larry Cranston ===
Mister Fear
- Larry Cranston as Mister Fear, art by Michael Lark

Publication information
- Publisher: Marvel Comics
- First appearance: Daredevil #88 (June 1972); Daredevil #91 (September 1972; as Mister Fear)
- Created by: Gerry Conway; Gene Colan

In-story information
- Alter ego: Lawrence "Larry" Cranston
- Partnerships: Lucia von Bardas
- Abilities: Skilled lawyer Extensively trained hand to hand combatant Fear pheromone administered primarily by gas pellets, occasionally by syringe, most recently by an aerosol sprayer Use of a perfume that made him able to influence other people

Lawrence "Larry" Cranston was a law school classmate of Matt Murdock. After learning that Starr Saxon had died, Cranston decided to take on the Mister Fear guise himself. As the third Mister Fear, Cranston goes mad during his first effort against Daredevil in San Francisco, jumping off a building, assuming that he was wearing a rocket pack which he had previously worn in battle with the hero, and seemingly dies from his injuries.

Cranston survived the fall and returned years later. He masterminds a series of campaigns meant to discredit Daredevil with the aid of the Enforcers, Eel, and Insomnia. Daredevil defeats them and Cranston abandons the Mister Fear identity.

Cranston later resurfaces, along with the Enforcers, providing the criminals of Hell's Kitchen a drug that causes the user to become psychotic and completely unafraid of death. In an attempt to make Daredevil's life miserable, Cranston secretly causes Milla Donovan (Daredevil's wife) to overdose on the drug, causing her to murder an innocent man. Cranston, having killed the drug's creator and destroyed all of the antidote's known samples, forces Daredevil to spare his life, as he was the only one whose testimony could save Donovan from being sentenced to death for the murder committed earlier. Before he is sent to prison, Cranston has one of his henchmen provide him with a new chemical compound he had created, which makes everyone worship him. With this new power, Cranston secures himself a lavish prison cell.

During the "King in Black" storyline, Mister Fear is among the villains recruited by Mayor Wilson Fisk to be part of the Thunderbolts during Knull's invasion.

=== Alan Fagan ===
Mister Fear

Publication information
- Publisher: Marvel Comics
- First appearance: Marvel Team-Up #92 (April 1980)
- Created by: Steven Grant; Carmine Infantino

In-story information
- Alter ego: Alan Fagan
- Partnerships: Lucia von Bardas
- Abilities: Highly adept businessman Fear pheromone administered primarily by gas pellets, occasionally by syringe or an aerosol sprayer

Alan Fagan was born in Madison, Wisconsin. He is Larry Cranston's nephew and Ariel Tremmore's father. When Cranston seemingly died, Fagan came into possession of the fear gas and other equipment.

As the fourth Mister Fear, Fagan attempts to use his fear-gas in blackmail schemes which were stymied by Spider-Man, with the aid of Hawkeye. Fagan is brutally attacked in prison by men in the employ of Ariel, who carve much of the skin from his face. Ariel takes fear gas residue from Fagan's skin and uses it for herself, becoming the villain Shock.

Fagan recovers from these injuries and receives improved weaponry and armor from Lucia von Bardas. The weaponry is later destroyed.

Fagan is hired by the Hood to take advantage of the superhero community split caused by the Superhuman Registration Act.

== Powers and abilities ==
Mister Fear employs a compound based on the flight scent pheromone—chemicals produced by most animals, used to communicate a variety of simple messages over distances. The drug induces severe anxiety, fear, and panic, and sometimes nightmarish hallucinations, rendering victims incapable of fighting or resisting his will. The dosage contained in one pellet is enough to incapacitate a normal adult male for about 15 minutes, or an exceptionally fit male, such as Daredevil, for about five minutes. The side effects of anxiety and nausea can persist for several days.

Larry Cranston has a law degree and a fair amount of legal expertise. He displayed the ability to influence the minds of other people into doing whatever he wanted them to do. Cranston also trained extensively in hand-to-hand combat for his confrontation with Daredevil.

Alan Fagan uses miniature hypodermic needles to inject a large dose of the liquid directly into the bloodstream. He has also used a hand-held weapon that fires capsules of the fear gas. Working with an unidentified chemist, Fagan adapted other pheromones to his use, including one that makes a man sexually irresistible to women.
