= Shock (character) =

Character within Marvel Comics

Publication information
- Publisher: Marvel Comics
- First appearance: Daredevil #314 (March 1993)
- Created by: Dan G. Chichester; Scott McDaniel

In-story information
- Alter ego: Ariel Tremmore
- Notable aliases: Mistress of Fear, Ariel Fagan
- Abilities: Emotion manipulation via pheromones Fear-inducing hallucination generation Razor-sharp teeth and talons

Shock (Ariel Tremmore) is a supervillain appearing in American comic books published by Marvel Comics. A psychopathic killer, she fought with Daredevil in New York City. Shock possesses the power to induce fear and hallucinations in other people by releasing pheromones through her skin.

== Publication history ==
Shock was introduced in Daredevil #314 (March 1993).

== Fictional character biography ==
Ariel Tremmore is the illegitimate daughter of Alan Fagan and Cora Tremmore, and hence the grand-niece of Larry Cranston. Alan refused to take any responsibility for Ariel, abandoning both Cora and Ariel.

Cora grew angry at Alan, and this anger rubbed off on her as she grew up. After Cora died in a horrific workplace accident, Ariel dedicated herself to her mother's goal of being better than her father and sought vengeance for her father's absence in their lives and for the embarrassment of having the notorious Mister Fear as a father.

Ariel found that she needed a source of income to live in the city and she turned to a variety of ways of making money, including theft and prostitution.

Eventually, Ariel paid a group of prison inmates to attack her imprisoned father and to bring her a piece of skin from Fagan's face. Ariel took the sample to a chemist to be examined; Ariel theorised that her father's skin sample would be laced with some of Mister Fear's fear-gas. This was of interest to Ariel as she was determined to produce a new and improved fear chemical for use against her father. Once the chemical had been synthesised, Ariel injected said chemical into her own body and was transformed into a fearsome looking creature. She decided to call herself as the creature "Shock", the Mistress of Fear.

Using her newfound powers, Shock terrorized the population of New York City's population and attracted Daredevil's attention. Daredevil's super-senses to trace the chemical scent back to Ariel. Transforming into Shock, she used her abilities to enrage Daredevil, and she knocked the superhero off the top of the building as they fought. They both landed safely, and Shock escaped by using her powers to cause panic in the streets.

Shock then visited her father in hospital. He was dying, but Shock tormented Fagan with her powers until Fagan's vital signs began to strengthen. At the same time, Daredevil tracked her down again ready to bring her in. But this time, she caused Daredevil to hallucinate being attacked by Elektra.

In turn, Daredevil managed to keep a head clear long enough from illusions to force Shock to take another dose of her chemical. This transformed her back into her human form, and made it easy for her to be arrested. While she was being sent to jail, Ariel's hands turned back to their taloned form and she readied herself to break free.

== Powers and abilities ==
By consuming the chemical synthesized by her father's skin, Ariel transformed into a monstrous, nightmarish creature with razor sharp teeth and talons, scaly-skin with pointed ears and long red hair; she is known as Shock in this form.

Shock can generate terror, rage, hallucinations and hatred in other people through pheromones released through her skin.

She did not appear to be able to generate her emotion manipulating pheromones in her human form. However, the ending of her last appearance suggests that she may be able to transform to and from her monstrous form at will, rather than relying on chemicals.
