= Alexander Bont =

- Alexander Bont; Art by Alex Maleev

Publication information
- Publisher: Marvel Comics
- First appearance: Daredevil (vol. 2) #66 (December 2004)
- Created by: Brian Michael Bendis (writer); Alex Maleev (artist)

In-story information
- Species: Human
- Partnerships: Gladiator; Fixer
- Notable aliases: The Big Bont; The Kingpin
- Abilities: Superhuman strength and durability (via Mutant Growth Hormone); Skilled businessman

Alexander Bont is a character appearing in American comic books published by Marvel Comics. Created by writer Brian Michael Bendis and artist Alex Maleev, the character first appeared in Daredevil vol. 2 #66 (December 2004). Bont is one of the first villains encountered by the superhero Matt Murdock / Daredevil. Once the Kingpin of New York's criminal underworld prior to Wilson Fisk's ascent, Bont also employed the man responsible for murdering Jack Murdock.

Following his release from prison, Bont returned to a New York City vastly changed from the one he had once ruled. The traditional gangsters of his era had been replaced by costumed criminals with superpowers and theatrical personas. Enraged by this shift and seeking revenge against Daredevil—the hero responsible for his imprisonment—Bont resorted to the dangerously unstable Mutant Growth Hormone, which resulted in his death.

A gender-swapped version of Alexander Bont, known as Alexandra, is portrayed by Sigourney Weaver in the 2017 miniseries The Defenders, a crossover of Marvel's Netflix series set within the Marvel Cinematic Universe (MCU). In the series, Alexandra is depicted as the leader of the Hand and one of its five "fingers".

== Publication history ==
Alexander Bont debuted in Daredevil (vol. 2) #66 (December 2004), and was created by Brian Michael Bendis and Alex Maleev.

== Fictional character biography ==
Alexander Bont first made a name for himself when he killed the hero Defender. After that, he soon rose up the ranks and became the head of organized crime. The Fixer, the man who ordered the hit on Jack Murdock, paid up to Bont. When Daredevil found this out, he confronted Bont and had him arrested. Bont got out on bail. He later asked Matt Murdock for legal help, but was refused.

When Bont was released from jail, he was now a bitter old man. He had found out that Daredevil was really Matt Murdock from The Globe and had acquired a possession of Mutant Growth Hormone (MGH). Bont learns how much the world has changed in his absence, including the death of his wife. Furious, Bont swears revenge on Daredevil. He meets with Melvin Potter and threatens to kill his young daughter, forcing Potter into working for him.

Potter kidnaps Matt Murdock, then beats him. When White Tiger defeats Melvin Potter, Bont takes Mutant Growth Hormone to confront Daredevil. However, he overdoses on MGH, overloading his heart and killing him.

== Powers and abilities ==
Bont possesses no superhuman abilities, but he occasionally used Mutant Growth Hormone, a substance that temporarily enhanced his speed and strength and caused his eyes to emit a green glow.

== In other media ==
Sigourney Weaver portrays a female version of Alexander Bont, primarily known as Alexandra, in The Defenders. This version is the leader of the Hand. Alexandra is described as an "adversary" rather than a villain and was intended to be portrayed sympathically as a supporting character in Elektra Natchios' story. Alexandra is one of the five "fingers" of the Hand, who all gained immortality using the healing powers of qi. Following the death of Elektra, Alexandra resurrects her to create the ancient weapon Black Sky, which is prophesied to destroy all enemies of the Hand. Alexandra intends to use Elektra to steal the Iron Fist from Danny Rand. However, Elektra regains her memories of her previous life and kills Alexandra, claiming leadership of the Hand.
