= Black Widow (Marvel Comics) =

Name of some fictional characters in Marvel Comics

Black Widow is the name of several fictional characters appearing in American comic books published by Marvel Comics. Most of these versions exist in Marvel's main shared universe, known as the Marvel Universe.

== Claire Voyant ==
Claire Voyant is the first costumed, superpowered female protagonist in comic books. Created by writer George Kapitan and artist Harry Sahle, she first appeared in Mystic Comics #4 (Aug. 1940). She kills evildoers to deliver their souls to Satan, her master. The character is unrelated to the later Marvel Comics superheroines who took on the codename.

== Natasha Romanoff ==
Natasha Romanoff is the first character to take on the Black Widow codename in the modern mainstream Marvel Comics. She was created by editor and plotter Stan Lee, scripter Don Rico and artist Don Heck, and first appeared in Tales of Suspense #52 (April 1964). The character has been associated with several superhero teams in the Marvel Universe, including the Avengers, the Defenders, the Champions, S.H.I.E.L.D., and the Thunderbolts.

== Yelena Belova ==
Yelena Belova is the second character to take on the Black Widow codename in the modern mainstream comics who debuted briefly in Inhumans #5 (March 1999) and was fully introduced in the 1999 Marvel Knights mini-series Black Widow. A second miniseries, also titled Black Widow and featuring Natasha Romanoff and Daredevil, followed in 2001. The next year, Belova appeared in a three-issue miniseries titled Black Widow: Pale Little Spider under the mature-audience Marvel MAX imprint. This June to August 2002 story arc, by writer Greg Rucka and artist Igor Kordey, was a flashback to Belova's time as the second modern Black Widow.

== Alternative versions ==
=== Ultimate Marvel ===
The Ultimate Marvel universe features several characters who went by the Black Widow codename, including the Ultimate version of Natasha Romanoff.

==== Monica Chang ====
Monica Chang-Fury is the second character to use the Black Widow codename, debuting in Ultimate Comics: Avengers #3.

==== Jessica Drew ====
The Ultimate version of Jessica Drew is a female Spider-Clone who uses the Black Widow alias.

=== Marvel 2099 ===
Several versions of Black Widow are seen in the different Marvel 2099 realities, with one being the 2099 version of Yelena Belova:

==== Tania ====
During the "Secret Wars" storyline, a futuristic 2099 version of Black Widow is an African-American woman named Tania. She operates as part of the Avengers 2099 at the Alchemax corporation's behest in the Battleworld domain of 2099. Like black widow spiders, she literally eats her mates after having sex with them.

==== Black Widow 2098 ====
On the unified Marvel 2099 reality of Earth-2099, a Black Widow known as Black Widow 2098 was a member of the 2099 version of the Avengers. She was among those who were killed by the 2099 version of the Masters of Evil. Moon Knight 2099 later respawned in her crypt and formed the 2099 version of the New Avengers who defeated the Masters of Evil and remanded them to a prison on the planet Wakanda.

== In other media ==
=== Television ===
A character loosely inspired by Black Widow 2099 named Layla appears in the Avengers Assemble episode "Into the Future", voiced by Jennifer Hale. This version is a guerrilla warfare-styled resistance fighter from a future ruled by Kang the Conqueror.

=== Marvel Cinematic Universe ===
The Marvel Cinematic Universe (MCU) depicts Black Widows as a group of assassins who are graduates of the Red Room, a program led by Dreykov. Notable members are listed below.

- Natasha Romanoff (portrayed by Scarlett Johansson) is a former graduate of the Red Room who defected to the American intelligence agency S.H.I.E.L.D. and became a spy. Johansson first appeared as the character in Iron Man 2 (2010) and went on to star in other MCU media, including the stand-alone film Black Widow (2021).
- Yelena Belova (portrayed by Florence Pugh) is a graduate of the Red Room and Romanoff's adoptive sister. She later helps Romanoff take down Dreykov and the Red Room and goes on to be a member of the Thunderbolts. Pugh has portrayed the character in Black Widow (2021), Hawkeye (2021), Thunderbolts* (2025), and Spider-Man: Brand New Day (2026).
- Dottie Underwood (portrayed by Bridget Regan) was trained as an assassin prior to World War II as part of a precursor to the Black Widow program. She becomes an operative of Leviathan and a foe of Peggy Carter. She has appeared in the ABC television series Agent Carter (2015–2016).
- Ruth Bat-Seraph (portrayed by Shira Haas) is a former Black Widow assassin who was born in Israel and later trained in the Red Room. She becomes the security advisor to President Thaddeus Ross. Haas portrayed the character in the film Captain America: Brave New World (2025).

== See also ==
- List of Black Widow characters
- List of Black Widow titles
