= Lady Bullseye =

Fictional comic book character

- Lady Bullseye as seen on the cover to Daredevil #111. Art by Marko Djurdjevic.

Publication information
- Publisher: Marvel Comics
- First appearance: Daredevil Vol. 2 #111 (September 2008)
- Created by: Ed Brubaker; Marko Djurdjević; Clay Mann

In-story information
- Alter ego: Maki Matsumoto
- Species: Human
- Team affiliations: Anti-Arach9; Army of Evil; Assassins Guild; Hand
- Abilities: Proficient hand to hand combatant; Master martial artist; Skilled lawyer

Lady Bullseye (Maki Matsumoto) is a supervillain appearing in American comic books published by Marvel Comics. A female counterpart of Bullseye, she was created by Ed Brubaker, Marko Djurdjević, and Clay Mann, first appearing in Daredevil #111. She has primarily been an opponent of the superhero Daredevil.

Originally inspired to become a trained assassin when she witnessed Bullseye easily kill a number of people, she would later become a member of the Hand, although she did not hold their traditions in high esteem. Her alter ego works as a lawyer, opposing Matt Murdock in the courtroom, thereby attacking Daredevil on two fronts. Lady Bullseye's true intentions were to take control of the Hand clan, but instead Daredevil becomes their leader.

Reiko Aylesworth voiced the Maki Matsumoto incarnation of Lady Bullseye in the Hulu streaming television series Hit-Monkey, while Olivia Munn voiced Akiko Yokohama, a new incarnation and the self-declared nemesis of Hit-Monkey.

== Publication history ==
Lady Bullseye debuted in Daredevil #111 and was created by Ed Brubaker, Marko Djurdjevic, and Clay Mann. She was inspired by Lady Snowblood, a Japanese femme fatale.

== Fictional character biography ==
Born in Japan, the young girl who would become Lady Bullseye was imprisoned by the Yakuza, who planned to sell her and many others into sexual slavery. However, Bullseye, on an unrelated errand, arrived to slaughter the mobsters. The sight of Bullseye effortlessly killing her captors inspired the girl to escape and become a killer.

Years later in the employ of the famous ninja order the Hand, she arrives in New York City to spearhead Hand ninja-lord Hiroshi's plan. However, she has demonstrated little tolerance for The Hand's ritual, interrupting some (who are used to those traditions) off-guard in order to kill her enemies. She kills and resurrects both White Tiger and Black Tarantula to assist her.

At the same time, it has been revealed that in her civilian guise she is a lawyer, targeting Daredevil by assisting the parents of Murdock's mentally-ill wife Milla Donovan in gaining custody of her. When one of her associates discovers this, she kills him to prevent the Hand from learning the truth. Hiroshi claims that all she has done has been according to his will. Lady Bullseye offers Daredevil the leadership of the Hand, which he refuses. The organization regroups to Spain, preparing to initiate "Plan B". There, she finds Kingpin, trying to live a normal civilian life, and kills his new girlfriend and her kids, and brutally stabbing Kingpin, telling him that this is a message for Matt Murdock.

It turns out that Matsumoto's real goal was to take the leadership of the Hand herself, something she had been promised by Daredevil's ally Master Izo, who was revealed to have trained her. However, Izo was lying, and instead intended for Daredevil himself to take that post and reform the Hand. Daredevil has Lady Bullseye cast out of the Hand for being untrustworthy.

Lady Bullseye allies with the Kingpin against Daredevil, instigating a conflict between Daredevil and Norman Osborn, which ultimately leads to Daredevil declaring Hell's Kitchen the territory of the Hand.

Lady Bullseye later appears as a member of Octavia Vermis' Anti-Arach9.

Doctor Tramma hires Lady Bullseye on her boss' behalf to uncover Spider-Girl's ability to copy superpowers. She follows Makawalu Akana to her family's apartment and draws her out. While trying to figure out if Lady Bullseye has any connections with Bullseye, Spider-Girl copies her fighting skills. Spider-Girl is confronted by robbers, with Lady Bullseye escaping in the commotion.

== Powers and abilities ==
Lady Bullseye has no apparent superhuman powers, but is a master of several martial arts and a proficient hand-to-hand combatant, and specializes in using katana and shuriken. She is faster than Bullseye and less powerful than the Kingpin. Regardless, she has defeated Daredevil and Black Widow on separate occasions, and nearly defeated Daredevil on another occasion. Daredevil has commented that in her costumed form she has little scent and a very low pulse, akin to one performing yoga. She is also skilled in legal matters, being a lawyer in her civilian guise.

== Reception ==
=== Accolades ===
- In 2009, IGN included Lady Bullseye in their "Marvel's Femme Fatales" list.
- In 2017, CBR.com ranked Lady Bullseye 10th in their "Daredevil's 15 Deadliest Villains" list and 12th in their "Marvel's 15 Best Martial Artists" list.
- In 2021, Screen Rant included Lady Bullseye in their "10 Most Powerful Villains Of Kate Bishop's Hawkeye" list.
- In 2022, WhatCulture ranked Lady Bullseye 2nd in their "10 Villains We Hope To See In Daredevil: Born Again" list.
- In 2022, Screen Rant included Lady Bullseye in their "Daredevil's Main Comic Book Villains, Ranked Lamest To Coolest" list, in their "10 Best Street Level Villains That Need To Debut In The MCU" list and in their "10 Best Daredevil Comics Characters Not In The MCU" list.

== In other media ==
- Lady Bullseye appears in Hit-Monkey, voiced by Reiko Aylesworth. In the first season, she is hired by Bonsai Master on Shinji Yokohama's behalf to kill Hit-Monkey after he decimates the Yakuza while seeking vengeance for his tribe's slaughter. Initially dismissive of the job, she develops a vendetta against Monkey after he slices her cheek. Upon learning he is being assisted by the ghost of Bryce Fowler, a former associate of hers, she attempts to use salt to hurt Fowler, but inadvertently grants him temporary corporeality, allowing him to help police officer Haruka kill her. In the series' second season, she returns as a ghost to guide the second Lady Bullseye, Akiko Yokohama, in killing Monkey, on the condition of also avenging her own death. Lady Bullseye's ghost joins Akiko in taking on Fowler and Haruka. Deeming herself beyond her predecessor, Akiko annihilates Lady Bullseye's ghost by diving into the saltwater sea.
  - After Monkey kills Yokohama, the latter's niece and the former's ex-friend Akiko Yokohama (voiced by Olivia Munn) takes Matsumoto's mask and mantle, declaring herself Monkey's nemesis. In the second season, Akiko unsuccessfully attempts to kill Monkey, mentored by the ghost of her predecessor in doing so. In "Chapter Five: Akiko", Akiko is revealed to have been mentally unstable since a young child. After her parents were killed in a fire, Akiko killed several other orphans at the orphanage she had been sent to, before being sent to a sanitarium and freed by her uncle. After banishing the first Lady Bullseye's ghost, Akiko returns to attempt to kill Monkey's friends, but is killed by Hit-Monkey.
- Lady Bullseye appears in Moon Girl and Devil Dinosaur, voiced by Miki Yamashita. This version is older, more pompous, and passive-aggressive than her comics counterpart and leads a group called the Diabolical Darts.
- Lady Bullseye appears in Marvel Mystic Mayhem, voiced by Miki Ishikawa.
