= Masked Marauder =

- Art by John Romita

Publication information
- Publisher: Marvel Comics
- First appearance: Daredevil #16 (May 1966)
- Created by: Stan Lee; John Romita Sr. Frank Giacoia

In-story information
- Full name: Frank Farnum
- Species: Human
- Team affiliations: Maggia
- Notable aliases: Mr. Dunn
- Abilities: Skilled inventor Genius engineer Trained martial artist Wields various weapons

The Masked Marauder is a fictional character appearing in American comic books published by Marvel Comics. He briefly served as the central villain of the Daredevil title.

== Publication history ==
The Masked Marauder first appeared in Daredevil #16-19 (May-Aug. 1966), and was created by Stan Lee, John Romita Sr., and Frank Giacoia.

The character subsequently appears in Daredevil #22-23 (Nov.-Dec. 1966), #26-27 (March–April 1967), Iron Man #60-61 (July-Aug. 1973, Werewolf by Night #42-43 (Jan., March 1977), and Peter Parker, the Spectacular Spider-Man #25-28 (Dec. 1978-March 1979). The character appears again many years later in Punisher War Journal #4 (April 2007).

The Masked Marauder received an entry in the All-New Official Handbook of the Marvel Universe A to Z: Update #3 (2007).

== Fictional character biography ==
=== Versus Daredevil ===
Frank Farnum was the manager of the Manhattan building in which the law offices of Nelson and Murdock reside. How and why he became the Masked Marauder has never been revealed. He first appeared as an already successful crime leader with men, money, and resources at his command.

The Masked Marauder first came to the public's attention in a confrontation with Spider-Man; Spider-Man foiled his plans, but the Marauder himself escaped. He later clashed with Spider-Man again, with the same result, when he launched an attack on the World Motors Building in order to steal a new auto engine design, the XB-390, intending to modify it into a weapon.

In order to prevent Spider-Man from stopping him a third time, he ordered a half dozen of his men to impersonate Daredevil and attack Spider-Man, hoping to draw the two superheroes into conflict. When he heard of a fight between Spider-Man and Daredevil through a live news broadcast, he executed a fresh assault on the World Motors Building and stole the XB-390. However, J. Jonah Jameson set a trap by announcing the XB-390 is useless without the formula for fueling it. Falling for the deception, the Masked Marauder attacked the World Motors Building again, and his plans were yet again foiled by Spider-Man. Enraged, he defeated Spider-Man and tried to kill him, but was stopped by Daredevil. Once again, all of his men were captured. While fleeing the scene he overheard Foggy Nelson, a lawyer working out of an office in his building, insinuating to Karen Page that he is really Daredevil. Days later, he noticed Page going into the law office late one evening; his suspicious aroused, he confronted her in his civilian identity in the hope she would let slip some of Nelson's secrets (due to an editorial oversight, he is referred to as "Mr. Dunn" in this scene). However, Page gave nothing away and collapsed into a faint during their conversation. During this time he employed Nelson to draw up new leases for his building; it is never revealed if this was genuinely a matter of business, or an excuse to more closely study the man that he believed to be Daredevil.

Taking on new men, culled from the New York City underworld, the Marauder arranged to have the Gladiator sprung from prison. He intended to use him as glorified muscle, but the Gladiator proved very hard to tame, and the Marauder was forced to take him on as his partner. Meanwhile, he ordered his men to attack Foggy Nelson in his office. Though they failed, their attack revealed that Nelson was not in fact Daredevil. With the Gladiator, he hatched a plan to take over the Maggia by publicly defeating Daredevil, and sent an android called the Tri-Man against him. When this failed, he transported the Gladiator and Daredevil into a Colosseum movie set controlled by the Maggia. However, the Gladiator refused to continue fighting Daredevil after he saved him from the arena's lions. Bemused by his repeated failures, the Maggia told the Masked Marauder they "wouldn't even want you for a mascot".

Still convinced there is some connection between Nelson and Daredevil, the Marauder teamed up with the Stilt-Man and kidnapped Nelson, his partner Matt Murdock (Daredevil's alter ego), and Karen Page, holding them captive in a helicopter surrounded by a force field that disintegrates anything it comes in contact with. Murdock told them Daredevil is his twin brother Mike and, while Stilt-Man searched for the non-existent Mike, changed into his costume. He fought the Marauder and unintentionally knocked him into the lethal force field.

=== Battling other heroes ===
The Masked Marauder was presumed dead until he re-appeared in Detroit some years later. He revealed that his force field disintegrator was actually a teleportation device that allowed him to escape and start over again elsewhere. (Note: At this time, the media had long since reported Daredevil's death, so the Marauder had no reason to resume his quest for revenge on him.) With his henchmen Steele and Hacker, he stole Tony Stark's experimental space shuttle and ran afoul of Iron Man, who defeated him.

Later, the Marauder again encountered Iron Man along with Jack Russell, the Werewolf by Night. His plans (with his new henchmen Pardee, Creach, and Strenk) involved creating the Tri-Animan (an android created by the merging of three animals instead of three men) to aid in his revenge against the Maggia. He failed.

When the Marauder next appeared, he had somehow become Big M, the leader of the Nefaria "family" of the Maggia. In battle with Spider-Man and Daredevil, he "permanently" blinded the web-slinger and threatened New York with his "bombdroid", a Tri-Man carrying a nuclear device. As a blinded Spider-Man succeeded in defusing the bomb, Daredevil defeated the Marauder.

=== Post-Civil War ===
The Masked Marauder, along with a number of low-level supervillains, was attending a viewing/funeral/barroom brawl for the Stilt-Man (killed by the Punisher), when the Punisher (posing as a bartender) poisoned their drinks before blowing the bar up. They all had to get their stomachs pumped and be treated for third-degree burns.

=== Secret Invasion ===
During the Secret Invasion storyline, the Masked Marauder was seen helping the Hood fight the Skrulls.

== Powers and abilities ==
The Masked Marauder is a costumed criminal scientist whose helmet projects "opti-blasts" which can temporarily or permanently blind a victim. He is an engineering genius, and his inventions include the Tri-Man, the Tri-Animan, the Bombdroid, a truck with a "hydraulic hoist", a helicopter with a force field, and a teleportation device which can affect even unwitting targets who are far away. He also has modest training in the martial arts.

His planning abilities and knack for inspiring trust have allowed him to command well-trained teams of henchmen. However, his plans are often spoiled by his mental quirks. He insists that his men execute his plans according to timetables that schedule each step down to the second. Even a few seconds' deviation from one of his timetables causes him to become extremely agitated. He is also excessively arrogant, and always assumes that his opponents will be rendered completely helpless by his opti-blasts, despite being repeatedly proven wrong on this point.
