= Black Tarantula =

Marvel Comics characters

- Carlos LaMuerto as the Black Tarantula in The Amazing Spider-Man #432 (March 1998). Art by John Romita, Jr.

Publication information
- Publisher: Marvel Comics
- First appearance: The Amazing Spider-Man #419 (January 1997)
- Created by: Tom DeFalco (writer); Steve Skroce (artist)

In-story information
- Alter ego: Carlos LaMuerto; Fabian LaMuerto
- Species: Human mutate
- Team affiliations: The Hand
- Abilities: Skilled martial artist Superhuman strength, speed, agility, durability and reflexes/reactions Genius-level intelligence Energy beam projection through eyes Healing factor

Black Tarantula is the name of two fictional characters appearing in American comic books published by Marvel Comics.

The Carlos LaMuerto version of Black Tarantula first appears in The Amazing Spider-Man #419 (January 1997), and makes his first full appearance in The Amazing Spider-Man #432 (March 1998). Black Tarantula was created by writer Tom DeFalco and artist Steve Skroce.

== Fictional character biography ==
=== Carlos LaMuerto ===
"Black Tarantula" is a title inherited from father to son, all posing as the same person. Black Tarantula possesses a multitude of superhuman powers derived from a potion taken by his ancestor.

The current Black Tarantula, Carlos LaMuerto, moves his base of operations from Argentina to New York, claiming that he wants to expand his operation. He comes into conflict with crime lord Rose (Jacob Conover), and defeats Rose's enforcer, Delilah. Black Tarantula hires Roughouse and Bloodscream to work for him and drives back Rose, establishing control over a large part of New York City. When Rose goes to Don Fortunato, a powerful crime lord ruling over New York City, for help, Black Tarantula appears in person and offers Fortunato an alliance. Fortunato accepts, but Black Tarantula has to prove his loyalty by defeating Spider-Man and bringing back his mask. Black Tarantula succeeds in defeating Spider-Man, but lets him live when he learns that Spider-Man was trying to rescue a small child.

Black Tarantula is later seen at Ryker's Island and is taking drugs that suppress his superhuman powers. During a riot, Black Tarantula is attacked by Bullseye, who stabs him in the chest with a playing card. Black Tarantula is released early from prison due to a record of good behavior and prison overpopulation. Black Tarantula goes to Matt Murdock for a job; Murdock has him work with Dakota North, an investigator working for Nelson & Murdock. Black Tarantula, who is dissatisfied with the job, longs for a more hands on approach to stop crime. Murdock notices and takes Black Tarantula with him to battle a yakuza gang working in Hell's Kitchen. Later, Black Tarantula takes on a gang whose leader was hired to kill an old woman. This leader is a vengeful former recruit of Black Tarantula who, years before, Black Tarantula had personally invited into his gang, naming him "Little Loco". After Black Tarantula takes care of the gang, he kills Loco and leaves the money he took from the gang in a church.

Carlos LaMuerto's story is focused upon again in April 2008, in a one-shot issue entitled Daredevil: Blood of the Tarantula, where he turns in desperation to Matt Murdock to help his new 'mission'.

While out patrolling, Black Tarantula runs into White Tiger being attacked by Hand ninjas. While trying to help her, Black Tarantula is killed by White Tiger and resurrected by the Hand as an assassin. Black Tarantula then leads an attack against Daredevil at his home along with White Tiger, Lady Bullseye, and Lord Hirochi. They are fought off by Daredevil, Master Izo, and Iron Fist.

When Matt Murdock takes over leadership of the Hand, Black Tarantula and White Tiger become his lieutenants. Black Tarantula oversees the construction of "Shadowland" while Murdock and White Tiger are in Japan, meeting high-ranking Hand leaders from across the globe and discussing Murdock's vision of a more heroic Hand. While New York is in crisis, Black Tarantula is ordered by White Tiger to execute looters, but he becomes confused and sees that something is wrong with Murdock's motives. White Tiger, still possessed by the Hand, stabs Black Tarantula and leaves him for dead. Black Tarantula survives and is rehabilitated by Night Nurse.

=== Fabian LaMuerto ===
Fabian LaMuerto is the son of Carlos LaMuerto, who later succeeds him as Black Tarantula.

== Powers and abilities ==
Black Tarantula possesses superhuman strength enabling him to lift (press) up to 25 tons. He also possesses superhuman speed, reflexes and reactions, agility, and durability of an unquantified degree. He has a powerful healing factor on a par with the likes of Wolverine or Deadpool that, combined with his superhuman durability, make him extremely difficult to seriously injure. He is also able to stimulate the healing process in other people's bodies, though he rarely does this. He is able to fire laser-like beams from his eyes, but this drains his physical resources severely, so it is only used as a last resort. Black Tarantula is also skilled at different forms of martial arts, and has a genius level intellect.

== Other versions ==
Fabian LaMuerto as Black Tarantula in Spider-Girl #97 (April 2006). Art by Ron Frenz.

In an alternate future seen in the MC2 imprint, Fabian LaMuerto has taken up his father's mantle. Fabian possesses the same powers as his father, sports a variation of his suit, and wields metallic gauntlets. Though a criminal, Black Tarantula has a deep sense of honor, and has been an occasional ally of Spider-Girl. Following a time skip, Tarantula becomes a notorious crime lord known as the "Kingpin of Crime".

== In other media ==
- The Carlos LaMuerto incarnation of Black Tarantula appears in Marvel: War of Heroes.
- The Carlos LaMuerto incarnation of Black Tarantula appears in Spider-Man Unlimited.
