= Born Again (comics) =

Story arc in the comics series Daredevil

- Cover of Daredevil: Born Again
- Publisher: Marvel Comics
- Publication date: February – August 1986
- Main character(s): Matt Murdock; Wilson Fisk; Foggy Nelson; Karen Page; Ben Urich

Creative team
- Writer: Frank Miller
- Artist: David Mazzucchelli
- Letterer: Joe Rosen
- Colorist: Christie "Max" Scheele
- Trade Paperback: ISBN 0871352974
- Premiere Edition (Hardcover): ISBN 0785134808
- Premiere Edition (Trade Paperback): ISBN 0785134816
- Artist's Edition: ISBN 1613772386
- Artisan Edition: ISBN 1684055962
- Gallery Edition: ISBN 1302953044

"Born Again" is a 1986 story arc in the American comic book Daredevil, published by Marvel Comics. Written by Frank Miller and drawn by David Mazzucchelli, with colors by Christie "Max" Scheele and lettering by Joe Rosen, it was serialized in Daredevil #227–233 from February to August 1986. Widely regarded as one of the greatest superhero stories ever told, "Born Again" is considered a landmark of the Modern Age of Comic Books for its deconstruction of the superhero archetype through an attack on the hero's civilian identity rather than his physical abilities.

Frank Miller had previously revitalized Daredevil during his tenure as writer and artist from 1979 to 1983, transforming the title from a struggling series on the verge of cancellation into one of Marvel's best-selling books. Following Miller's departure, Dennis O'Neil served as series writer before preparing to leave. Editor Ralph Macchio approached Miller about returning, and Miller agreed on the condition that artist David Mazzucchelli, with whom he had first collaborated on Daredevil #226, handle the illustrations. Their partnership on "Born Again" was their most celebrated work together; they subsequently reunited for Batman: Year One (1987).

"Born Again" begins when Karen Page, the former secretary of the Nelson & Murdock law firm and ex-girlfriend of blind attorney Matt Murdock, sells his secret identity as Daredevil to a drug dealer in exchange for heroin. The information reaches crime lord Wilson Fisk, the Kingpin, who systematically dismantles Murdock's life by freezing his finances, foreclosing on his apartment, and engineering false criminal charges against him. Barred from practicing law and rendered homeless, a paranoid Murdock confronts the Kingpin directly and is beaten nearly to death before being discovered by a nun named Sister Maggie, his long-lost mother, who nurses him back to health. As Daily Bugle reporter Ben Urich investigates the Kingpin's scheme, Murdock slowly rebuilds his life and reconciles with Page. The story reaches its climax when the Kingpin deploys a super-soldier named Nuke against Hell's Kitchen, forcing Murdock to re-emerge as Daredevil; the resulting revelations, uncovered by Captain America, shatter the Kingpin's public image.

"Born Again" received acclaim for Mazzucchelli's expressionistic artwork, Miller's use of Catholic themes of fall and redemption, and its approach of dismantling the superhero through his secret identity rather than through physical combat. It solidified Miller's standing as one of the most important writers in the medium and gave Mazzucchelli star status as an artist. The story set the template for the Daredevil character for years afterward and is seen as an influential work in the transition toward darker, more mature superhero storytelling. It has been reprinted in numerous collected editions since its first trade paperback publication in 1987. Elements of the storyline were adapted for the third season of the Netflix television series Daredevil (2015–2018), and a Disney+ continuation series, Daredevil: Born Again, premiered in March 2025.

== Plot ==
Karen Page, the former secretary of the Nelson & Murdock law offices in New York City and ex-girlfriend of Matt Murdock, had left the city years earlier to pursue an acting career. After a brief period of success, she became a heroin addict and was reduced to starring in pornographic films in Mexico. Strapped for cash, she sells the information that Matt is Daredevil for a shot of heroin. This information is sold upward to the Kingpin.

Over the next 6 months, the Kingpin uses his influence to have the IRS freeze Murdock's accounts, the bank foreclose on his apartment, and police lieutenant Nicholas Manolis testifies that he saw Murdock pay a witness to perjure himself. By coincidence, Murdock's girlfriend, Glorianna O'Breen, breaks up with him and turns to dating his law partner and best friend Foggy Nelson on the rebound.

Daredevil's initial investigations uncover that Manolis is helping frame Murdock in exchange for medical treatments for his son. Still, he is unable to find who is behind the frame-up and is unwilling to turn Manolis in to the authorities. An exceptional legal defense by Nelson saves Murdock from a prison sentence, though he is barred from practicing law. With his initial plan foiled, the Kingpin has Murdock's apartment firebombed, which Murdock immediately recognizes as a deliberate and sloppy attempt by the Kingpin to destroy him. The Kingpin also gives out the order to kill anyone else who handled the information on Daredevil's identity. Karen eludes the Kingpin's assassins and makes her way to New York to find Matt.

Now homeless, suffering from paranoia and growing increasingly aggressive, Murdock is continuously followed by the Kingpin's subordinates, providing the Kingpin with frequent updates on Murdock's mental state, as he has become obsessed with the fruits of his scheme to destroy Murdock. Driven by thoughts of revenge, Murdock confronts the Kingpin in his office and is brutally beaten by the crime lord. To avert investigation into his death, the unconscious Murdock is drenched in whiskey and strapped into a stolen taxi cab, which is then pushed into the East River. Murdock regains consciousness, breaks out of the cab, and swims to safety. Badly injured, he stumbles through Hell's Kitchen, eventually finding his way to the gym where his father trained as a boxer. There, he is found by his mother Maggie who, having not been in Matt's life for decades, has become a nun at a local Catholic church. She nurses him back to health.

Meanwhile, Daily Bugle reporter Ben Urich is investigating his confidant's plight and stands vigil with Manolis as his son is taken in for surgery. When his son dies, Manolis confesses to Urich about the frame-up and his suspicions that the Kingpin was behind it. Nurse Lois, an enforcer assigned by the Kingpin to monitor Manolis, responds by breaking Urich's fingers and beating Manolis nearly to death. The unintimidated Manolis calls Urich from his hospital bed; however, Lois breaks into his room and strangles him, laying the receiver on his bed so Urich can hear his murder. At first Urich is shocked into silence and doesn't say anything. However, later he experiences a moment of epiphany and re-launches his investigation into Matt Murdock's frame-up.

Karen arrives in New York, having hitched a ride with Paulo Scorcese, a small-time drug smuggler and gangster who supplies her with heroin in exchange for sexual favors. She contacts Foggy to ask about Murdock's whereabouts. When he realizes that Paulo has been beating her, Foggy insists on taking her into his home.

Increasingly obsessed with killing Murdock, Kingpin uses his military connections to procure the services of a covert, experimental American super soldier, Nuke. To draw Murdock out of hiding, he arranges for a violent mental patient to be released from an asylum, dress up as Daredevil, and kill Nelson. Nurse Lois is ordered to relocate so that she cannot be implicated, but she rebels and attempts to kill Urich. Murdock, who has been shadowing Urich since hearing of the articles he is writing on the Kingpin, knocks out Lois and leaves her for the authorities. He then overhears a phone call that tips him off to the plot to kill Nelson.

Meanwhile, Page spots Scorcese stalking Nelson's apartment building. While she tries to prevent him from killing Nelson, the two are attacked by assassins who the Kingpin has ordered to kill anyone who emerges from the building. Murdock defeats the impostor Daredevil and saves Page, who confesses to being the one who gave away his secret identity. Murdock forgives her. Now back together, they move into a derelict apartment, where Murdock helps her through heroin withdrawal while supporting them as a diner chef.

Nurse Lois offers to testify against the Kingpin in exchange for a reduced sentence, but Kingpin has her killed by a bodyguard accompanying Urich when the reporter attempts to interview her in jail. Having failed to draw Murdock out of hiding, the Kingpin orders Nuke to fly to Hell's Kitchen and make a general assault on the neighborhood to send a message. From a helicopter, Nuke shoots dozens of civilians and destroys the diner where Murdock works. Appearing as Daredevil for the first time since his apartment was destroyed, he is left with no choice but to kill both Nuke and his pilot to avoid further civilian deaths. However, Nuke survives his attack, and the Avengers take him into custody.

Captain America, disturbed that Nuke has a U.S. flag tattooed on his face, investigates his background. When the military authorities give him evasive answers, he breaks into top-secret records and discovers Nuke is the only surviving test subject of several attempts to recreate Project: Rebirth, the project that enhanced the Captain's own body. Nuke breaks free from custody in the same base. Captain America stops him, but the Kingpin gives the order to kill Nuke. The military shoots Nuke. Having heard of Nuke's escape while stealing money from Kingpin's drug importers to rebuild the diner, Daredevil grabs Nuke from Captain America and takes him to the Daily Bugle, hoping to get him to testify about the Kingpin. He is not fast enough, and Nuke dies during the trip to the newspaper before he can provide any evidence.

Trying to get Nuke back from Daredevil, Captain America stumbles upon one of the hitmen sent to kill Nuke. The hitman names the Kingpin as being behind Nuke's assault on Hell's Kitchen, setting off a wave of lawsuits. Although the Kingpin is able to fight off most of the charges, his public image as an honest and respectable businessman is shattered, and his lieutenants lose confidence in him. His obsession unabated, he disregards Captain America's role and plans for revenge on Murdock instead. As for Murdock, he lives happily in Hell's Kitchen with Karen and continues to fight for justice in his neighborhood.

== Background and creation ==
With regular writer Dennis O'Neil preparing to leave the series, long-running Daredevil editor Ralph Macchio called up Frank Miller and asked if he would be interested in returning. Miller, whose first stint as writer had brought Daredevil from the brink of cancellation to the top-sellers lists, agreed under the condition that artist David Mazzucchelli would work on the illustrations following their first collaboration in issue #226. Contrary to rumor, Mazzucchelli did not draw over layouts by Miller; the artwork on the story is entirely Mazzucchelli's.

== Analysis ==
=== Themes ===
Miller's stated approach in "Born Again" was to destroy Murdock not through physical combat but through his civilian life. One study of the text notes that stripping a superhero of his civilian life rather than his physical capabilities had not been done so thoroughly in the genre before. The Kingpin articulates his own method in the story: "He faces poverty and public shame. He will be hounded by doctored tax files, deprived of his very home. Survival will become his only concern." At the story's conclusion he twists Daredevil's Silver Age catchphrase against him: "And I — I have shown him... that a man without hope... is a man without fear."

I thought, 'Break him down. Destroy him.' And then have the real deep hero emerge. And what I thought was the winning idea was I got rid of the costume for a good long time. And so that he wasn't wearing the tights and you realized the hero wasn't the costume. The costume was just dressing around the hero." [Enter the Superheroes]

The story's structure follows Christian theological concepts almost exclusively. Its chapter titles are "Apocalypse," "Purgatory," "Pariah," "Born Again," "Saved," "God and Country," and "Armageddon." The title invokes the Catholic teaching on Baptism, drawn from the third chapter of the Gospel of John, in which Jesus tells Nicodemus that one's old life must end before new life can begin. Though set during the Christmas season, the story follows Easter themes: the splash pages of the first four chapters show Murdock lying down, in a fetal position in chapters two and three, then in the pose of the crucified Christ in chapter four, before chapter five shows him standing upright. In chapter three, Murdock's walk through Hell's Kitchen parallels Jesus's walk to Golgotha, including three falls corresponding to the Stations of the Cross, before ending with the image of the Pietà, Sister Maggie in the role of the Virgin Mary.

In a 2023 article in the Journal of Graphic Novels and Comics, Joshua Rene Cavazos applies Lacanian psychoanalytic theory to the story, arguing that both Murdock and the Kingpin are driven by what Lacan called "lack"; the permanently unresolved desire for fulfilment. Murdock's objet petit a, the object-cause of desire, is justice for Hell's Kitchen; the Kingpin's is public legitimacy. The Kingpin states this in Daredevil #232: "I am not a villain, son. I am a corporation — in the conglomerate that is America." In Daredevil #233, receiving a business leadership award, he reflects: "The Kingpin of crime... how easily I will shed that title. How happily." Cavazos argues that the two characters perpetually obstruct each other's attempts at fulfilment, and that this structural irresolution is what the serial narrative format of comic books requires.

Miller later described "Born Again" as "the first of a series of works that I'd been involved with where I've looked at taking the machinery of the hero apart and putting it back together in leaner form so it was more pure," the first in a sequence that included The Dark Knight Returns (1986) and Batman: Year One (1987).

=== Artistic style ===
Mazzucchelli's artwork is representational in style, built on soft lines that convey understated movement and facial expression. Action sequences are simplified rather than amplified; the story's weight sits in quiet, character-focused panels. Catholic imagery runs throughout: cathedrals, stained-glass windows, nuns. The palette is dominated by red and black: red references Daredevil's costume but also symbolizes the bloodshed required for rebirth, while all other colors are kept muted so that the two predominant colors stand out.

Panel size controls pacing: small panels carry quick or routine action; larger panels slow the reader and direct attention to individual characters. Overhead shots appear at key moments to make power relationships visible: when a physically diminished Murdock confronts the Kingpin, the reader views him from above; when Daredevil emerges from fire at the story's climax, he faces outward. Mazzucchelli's style borrows from Miller's earlier Daredevil work, particularly its heavy blacks, while also recalling earlier artists on the title, including Wally Wood, Gene Colan, and Gil Kane. In his afterword to the 1987 collected edition, Miller praised Mazzucchelli's ability to "make a three-dimensional stage of the individual panel, complete in authentic detail, nonetheless uncluttered and utterly readable," writing that Mazzucchelli "creates actors whose dramatic range is startling, whose best and most compelling moments are wordless."

== Collected editions ==
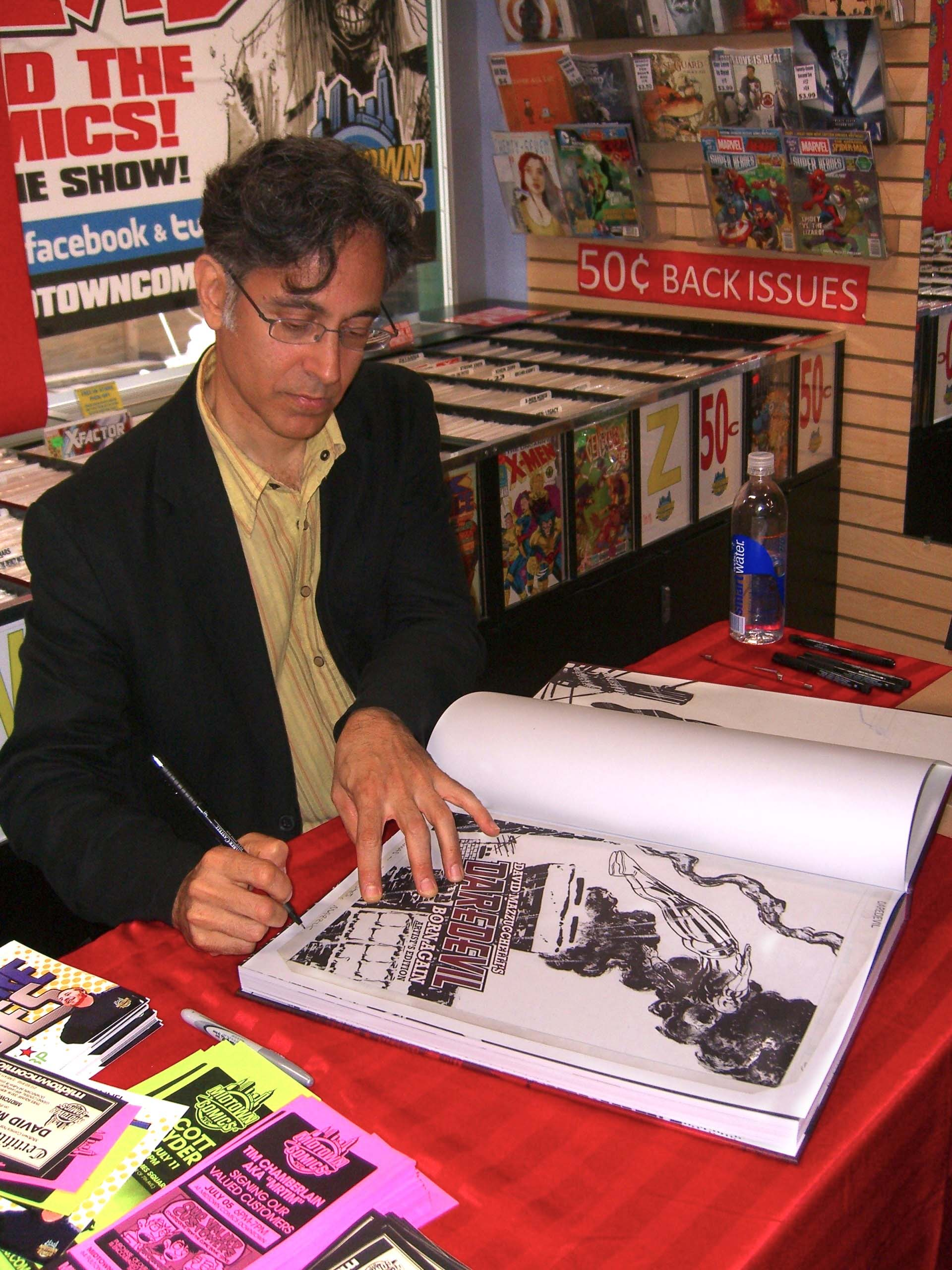
David Mazzucchelli autographing a copy of the Artist's Edition at Midtown Comics in Manhattan on June 28, 2012

The trade paperback collected edition was published in 1987. Between 2009 and 2010, Marvel reprinted the "Born Again" storyline in hardcover and trade paperback as part of Marvel Premiere Classic. The direct market variant edition was limited to only 1229 copies. Daredevil issue #226 is also included in this reprint.

In 2012, IDW Publishing published the Artist's Edition of the story in a 200-page hardcover. Mazzucchelli personally supplied all the artworks for scanning and supervised the process of the development for approval. The 250 copies limited edition was exclusively available only for pre-ordering; this version includes a colorful slipcase, a variant design of the front cover, and Mazzucchelli's personal signature printed in an interior page. The trade paperback, known as an Artisan Edition, was published on 2019. This version, however, is scaled down to the standard size of a graphic novel despite retaining the same content as the regular version.

The large-format Gallery Edition was released in August 2023.

In late 2024, Marvel Comics announced plans for the Premier Collection, a new line of paperback digests "featuring Marvel’s most celebrated and prestigious storylines and creators from its entire comic book legacy". Daredevil: Born Again was the first release, in February 2025, with an afterword by writer Frank Miller and a foreword by actor Charlie Cox, who plays Daredevil in the Marvel Cinematic Universe.

| Title | Material collected | Format | Pages | Publisher | Released dates | ISBN |
|---|---|---|---|---|---|---|
| Daredevil Born Again | Daredevil #227-233 | TPB | 176 | Marvel Comics | 1987 | 0871352974 |
| Daredevil Legends: Born Again | Daredevil #227-233 | TPB | 176 | Marvel Comics | 26 Nov 2001 | 978-0871352972 |
| Daredevil by Frank Miller Companion | Daredevil #219, 226–233; Daredevil: The Man Without Fear #1–5; Daredevil: Love And War, Peter Parker, the Spectacular Spider–Man #27–28 | Omnibus | 608 | Marvel Comics | 28 Dec 2007 | 978-0785126768 |
| Daredevil by Frank Miller Companion | Daredevil #219, 226–233; Daredevil: The Man Without Fear #1–5; Daredevil: Love And War, Peter Parker, the Spectacular Spider–Man #27–28 | Omnibus | 608 | Marvel Comics | 6 Apr 2016 | 1st reprinting: 978-0785195382 |
| Daredevil by Frank Miller Companion | Daredevil #219, 226–233; Daredevil: The Man Without Fear #1–5; Daredevil: Love And War, Peter Parker, the Spectacular Spider–Man #27–28 | Omnibus | 608 | Marvel Comics | 14 May 2024 | 2nd reprinting: 978-1302957650 |
| Daredevil Born Again (Marvel Premiere Classic) | Daredevil #226-233 | HC | 248 | Marvel Comics | Jan 2009 | Bookstore cover: 978-0785134800 |
| Daredevil Born Again (Marvel Premiere Classic) | Daredevil #226-233 | HC | 248 | Marvel Comics | Jan 2009 | Direct Market cover: 978-0785136552 |
| Daredevil Born Again (Marvel Premiere Classic) | Daredevil #226-233 | TPB | 248 | Marvel Comics | Jan 2010 | 978-0785134817 |
| David Mazzucchelli's Daredevil Born Again Artist's Edition | Daredevil #227-233 | HC | 200 | IDW Publishing | Jun 2012 | Standard edition: 978-1613772386 |
| David Mazzucchelli's Daredevil Born Again Artist's Edition | Daredevil #227-233 | HC | 200 | IDW Publishing | Jun 2012 | Limited edition: 978-1613773437 |
| David Mazzucchelli's Daredevil Born Again Artist's Edition | Daredevil #227-233 | HC | 200 | IDW Publishing | Mar 2025 | Standard edition reprinting: 979-8887242644 |
| David Mazzucchelli's Daredevil Born Again Artisan Edition | Daredevil #227-233 | TPB | 216 | IDW Publishing | Sep 2019 | 978-1684055968 |
| Daredevil Born Again Gallery Edition | Daredevil #226-233 | HC | 248 | Marvel Comics | 21 Aug 2023 | 978-1302953041 |
| Daredevil Born Again (Marvel Premier Collection) | Daredevil #226-233 | TPB | 280 | Marvel Comics | 4 Feb 2025 | 978-1302965983 |

== Reception ==
In regard to the rise of Daredevil comic popularity during Frank Miller's run in the 1980s, "Born Again" is considered one of the best storylines within the Daredevil mythos, with praise for Miller's and Mazzucchelli's artwork, storyline and religious narrative mirroring Matt Murdock's arc from fall and rise. Fans and critics see "Born Again" to be an influential period during the start of the Modern Age of Comic Books.

== Sequel ==
The "Last Rites" story arc in Daredevil #297–300, though written and drawn by an entirely different set of creators (except for colorist Christie Scheele), is to an extent a thematic sequel to "Born Again". The plot of "Last Rites" is centered on Daredevil systematically destroying the Kingpin's reputation and worldly possessions, much as the Kingpin did to him in "Born Again". In an explicit acknowledgement of this parallel, a deranged Kingpin mutters "born again..." in the final installment. The story also sees Murdock finally unraveling the frame job from "Born Again", winning back his attorney's license.

In an ongoing subplot of "Born Again", the Kingpin hires Foggy Nelson for one of his firms. When writer Frank Miller left the series, this plot thread was temporarily abandoned, before finally being resolved in Daredevil #248–256.

== In other media ==
- Director Mark Steven Johnson had expressed interest in directing a sequel to Daredevil (2003) with the "Born Again" storyline as inspiration. In June 2011, Fringe writer Brad Caleb Kane was rumored to be adapting the "Born Again" storyline for the film. In August 2012, 20th Century Fox turned down a pitch by director Joe Carnahan for a film based on "Born Again". On October 10, the Daredevil film rights reverted to Marvel Studios.
- Elements of the "Born Again" story arc are adapted into the second and third seasons of the Marvel Cinematic Universe (MCU) Netflix television series Daredevil (2015). After engineering Frank Castle's prison escape, the imprisoned Wilson Fisk asks for files on Matt Murdock. Additionally, Benjamin "Dex" Poindexter (Wilson Bethel) replaces the unnamed asylum patient in impersonating Daredevil on Fisk's behalf. Furthermore, several moments and lines from "Born Again" are used throughout Daredevil and the miniseries The Defenders.
- A sequel series to Daredevil, subtitled Born Again, premiered on Disney+ in March 2025, as part of Phase Five of the MCU. The series does not adapt the comic storyline, but is named after it to represent "the return of the characters" and Daredevil and Kingpin being "reborn in different iterations in this, but they're not new. They're the people they always were."
