= Daredevil (Marvel Comics series) =

Multiple comic book series

- The cover of the first issue of Daredevil (April 1964) features the superhero's debut. Art by Bill Everett.

Publication information
- Schedule: Varied
- Format: Ongoing series
- Genre: Superhero
- Publication date: 1964 – present
- No. of issues: List: (vol. 1): 381 (#1–380 plus #−1) and 10 Annuals (vol. 2): 119 (vol. 1 cont.): 13 (vol. 3): 37 (#1–36 plus #10.1) and 1 Annual (vol. 4): 21 (#1–18 plus #0.1, #1.50 and 15.1) (vol. 5): 28 and 1 Annual (vol. 1 cont.): 18 (vol. 6): 36 and 1 Annual (vol. 7): 14 (vol. 8): 13 (#1–13) (as of December 2024 cover date)

Creative team
- Written by: List: (vol. 1) Stan Lee (1–9, 11–50, Annual #1), Roy Thomas (51–69, 71), Gerry Conway (72–78, 80–98, 118), Steve Gerber (97–101, 103–117), Marv Wolfman (124–143, Annual #4), Roger McKenzie (151–161, 163–166, 183), Dennis O'Neil (18, 194–202, 204–207, 210–218, 220–223, 225–226), Frank Miller (168–191, 219, 226–233), Ann Nocenti (236, 238–245, 247–291) D. G. Chichester (292–309, 312–332, 338–342, 380), J. M. DeMatteis (344–350), Karl Kesel (353–364), Joe Kelly (-1, 358, 365–375), Scott Lobdell (376–379) (vol. 2) Kevin Smith (1/2, 1–8), David Mack (9–11, 13–15, 51–55), Brian Michael Bendis (16–19, 26–50, 56–81), Ed Brubaker (82–119) (vol. 1 cont.) Andy Diggle (vols. 3–4) Mark Waid (vol. 5) Charles Soule (vols. 6–7) Chip Zdarsky (vol. 8) Saladin Ahmed
- Penciller: List: (vol. 1) Bill Everett, Joe Orlando, Wally Wood, John Romita Sr., Gene Colan, Bob Brown, Frank Miller, Klaus Janson, David Mazzucchelli, Lee Weeks (vol. 2) Joe Quesada, Alex Maleev, Michael Lark (vol. 1 cont.) Roberto De la Torre, Marco Checchetto (vol. 3) Paolo Rivera, Marcos Martín, Chris Samnee
- Inker: List: (vol. 1) Vince Colletta, Syd Shores, Klaus Janson (vol. 2) Jimmy Palmiotti, Danny Miki, Stefano Gaudiano
- Colorist: List: (vol. 2) Brian Haberlin, Matt Hollingsworth (vol. 3) Javier Rodriguez

Daredevil is the name of several American comic book titles featuring the superhero Daredevil, the vigilante secret identity of blind attorney Matt Murdock, who gains superhuman senses as a result of an accident involving radioactive material. All of the volumes are published by Marvel Comics, beginning with the original Daredevil comic book series which debuted in 1964. The first volume was the longest in duration, lasting until 1998. In the 1960s, the series was written by Stan Lee and first drawn by Bill Everett with some assistance from Jack Kirby. Daredevil is usually based in Hell's Kitchen, Manhattan. Karen Page was Daredevil's primary love interest throughout this first series, with many ups and downs. Foggy Nelson appears as a recurring character throughout all the Daredevil series, as Matt Murdock's close friend and partner in law.

Wally Wood introduced the character's standard red costume, and was succeeded by John Romita Sr. and then Gene Colan as artist. Lee wrote the stories until 1969. Roy Thomas wrote the title from 1969 to 1971. In the 1970s, it was written by Gerry Conway, among others. In this period, Daredevil temporarily teamed with Black Widow in San Francisco. In 1972, Steve Gerber became the primary artist for the series. A number of different writers worked on the title, including Marv Wolfman, who introduced Daredevil's archenemy Bullseye. In the late 1970s Roger McKenzie wrote the series and brought an influence from horror comics.

Frank Miller's influential tenure on the title in the early 1980s, drawing inspiration from crime comics, established the prominence and originality of the title. In this period, Daredevil was one of the best-selling American comic books. He introduced influences from film noir and ninja films, and created the character Elektra, Daredevil's troubled ex-girlfriend, and an army of evil ninjas, the Hand. Miller emphasized Bullseye and Kingpin as Daredevil's primary antagonists, and also introduced the Punisher to the series. The issue that concluded in Elektra's shocking, violent death was a particularly striking event in comics of the decade. After a brief tenure by Dennis O'Neil, Miller returned to the series to write the acclaimed Born Again storyline, in which Page has become a heroin addict and sells Matt Murdock's secret identity to his enemies. Ann Nocenti, his successor, focused more on themes from left-wing politics, and created the villain Typhoid Mary. Miller also wrote the Daredevil: The Man Without Fear miniseries in the early 1990s, which delved into the backstory of the title character and his early relationship with Elektra. John Romita Jr. collaborated with both Miller and Nocenti. Also in the 1990s, writer D.G. Chichester in collaboration with Scott McDaniel changed the title character's costume and emulated the tumultuous, sensationalistic style of the comics of the period. Chichester also re-introduced Elektra to the series, resurrected from the dead.

Later in the decade, Joe Quesada began volume 2 of the series, which lasted from 1998 to 2011. This new series, first edited under the Marvel Knights imprint, restored the popularity of the title. Popular film director Kevin Smith also wrote a pivotal arc, in which Karen Page was killed by Bullseye. Subsequently, Brian Michael Bendis and Alex Maleev collaborated on a critically acclaimed arc. In the 21st century, Ed Brubaker then wrote a storyline that was similarly acclaimed. Both Bendis and Brubaker focused on the darker aspects of the character. Mark Waid, who wrote a third and fourth volume, took a somewhat lighter approach and focused on the character's unusual powers. Charles Soule wrote a fifth volume.

Many of the storylines published in Daredevil have been critically acclaimed, and have won a number of Eisner Awards.

== Daredevil vol 1. (1964-1998) ==
=== 1960s ===
Martin Goodman, the publisher of Marvel Comics, was impressed by the popularity of Spider-Man and asked Stan Lee to create a similar character based on the original Daredevil, a superhero of the 1940s. Lee initially requested assistance from Steve Ditko, the co-creator of Spider-Man, but he declined the assignment. Lee then sought the creative input of Bill Everett, who had previously created Namor, and Jack Kirby, the co-creator of the Fantastic Four, the Avengers, and other well-known superheroes. Kirby and Everett co-designed Daredevil's original costume. Lee and Kirby have each claimed credit for Daredevil's billy club, which he uses to swing from buildings. The original costume design was a combination of black, yellow, and red, reminiscent of acrobat tights. Paul Young indicates that the basic concept of the character as a heroic blind vigilante is probably inspired by the symbol and motif of blind justice. Timothy D. Peters, a legal scholar, has also drawn attention to the recurring visual analogy with Lady Justice, the classical figure for the legal system. The character was generally considered second-string in Marvel's pantheon of heroes, and had low commercial viability for the first decade and a half of his existence, prior to Frank Miller's re-invention.

The series began with Marvel Comics' Daredevil #1 (cover date April 1964), written by Stan Lee and drawn by Bill Everett. The cover of the first issue was based on Jack Kirby's original concept sketch, but inked by Everett. Everett pencilled the contents of the issue. When Everett turned in his first-issue pencils extremely late, Marvel production manager Sol Brodsky and Spider-Man co-creator Steve Ditko inked a large variety of different backgrounds, a "lot of backgrounds and secondary figures on the fly and cobbled the cover and the splash page together from Kirby's original concept drawing". The first issue covered the character's origins as well as the murder of his father, boxer "Battling Jack" Murdock, who raised young Matthew Michael Murdock in the Hell's Kitchen neighborhood of Manhattan, New York City. Jack instils in Matt the importance of education and non-violence with the aim of seeing his son become a better man than himself. In the course of saving a blind man from the path of an oncoming truck, Matt is blinded by a radioactive substance that falls from the vehicle. The radioactive exposure heightens his remaining senses beyond normal human limits, and gives him a kind of "radar" sense, enabling him to detect the shape and location of objects around him. To support his son, Jack Murdock returns to boxing under the Fixer, a known gangster, and the only man willing to contract the aging boxer. When he refuses to throw a fight because his son is in the audience, he is killed by one of the Fixer's men. Having promised his father not to use violence to deal with his problems, Matt adopts a new identity who can use physical force. Adorned in a yellow and black costume made from his father's boxing robes and using his superhuman abilities, Matt confronts the killers as the superhero Daredevil, unintentionally causing the Fixer to have a fatal heart attack.

Wally Wood introduced Daredevil's standard red costume in issue #7, which depicts Daredevil's battle against the far more powerful Sub-Mariner, and has become a classic story of the early series. Wood also redesigned Daredevil's costume to include communications equipment; in his depiction, the mask contains a complex radio receiver, and his horns are both antennae to pick up radio signals and amplifiers of his own super-sensory radar blips. However, these concepts would be dropped.

John Romita Sr. became the new artist in May 1966, just prior to his long tenure on The Amazing Spider-Man. The issue marked Romita's return to superhero pencilling after a decade of working exclusively as a romance-comic artist for DC. Romita had felt he no longer wanted to pencil, in favor of being solely an inker. He recalled in 1999,

I had inked an Avengers job for Stan, and I told him I just wanted to ink. I felt like I was burned out as a penciller after eight years of romance work. I didn't want to pencil any more; in fact, I couldn't work at home any more – I couldn't discipline myself to do it. He said, 'Okay,' but the first chance he had he shows me this Daredevil story somebody had started and he didn't like it, and he wanted somebody else to do it.

Romita later elaborated:

Stan showed me Dick Ayers' splash page for a Daredevil. He asked me, "What would you do with this page?" I showed him on a tracing paper what I would do, and then he asked me to do a drawing of Daredevil the way I would do it. I did a big drawing of Daredevil ... just a big, tracing-paper drawing of Daredevil swinging. And Stan loved it.

Daredevil embarks on a series of adventures involving such villains as the Owl and the Purple Man. In issue #16 (May 1966), Daredevil meets Spider-Man, who will eventually become one of Daredevil's closest friends. A letter from Spider-Man unintentionally exposes Daredevil's secret identity, compelling him to adopt a third identity as his twin brother Mike Murdock, whose carefree, wisecracking personality more closely resembles the Daredevil guise than the stern, studious, and emotionally-withdrawn Matt Murdock. The "Mike Murdock" plotline was used to highlight the character's quasi-multiple personality disorder. This third identity was dropped in issues #41–42; Daredevil fakes Mike Murdock's death and claims he had trained a replacement Daredevil.

When Romita left to take over The Amazing Spider-Man, Lee gave Daredevil to what would be the character's first signature artist, Gene Colan, who began with issue #20 (September 1966). Though #20 identifies Colan as a fill-in penciller, Romita's work load prevented him from returning to the title, and Colan ended up penciling all but three issues through #100 (June 1973), plus the 1967 annual, followed by ten issues sprinkled from 1974 to 1979. He would return again for an eight-issue run in 1997.

Lee never gave Colan a full script for an issue of Daredevil; instead, he would tell him the plot, and Colan would tape record the conversation to refer to while drawing the issue, leaving Lee to add the script in afterwards. Though Colan is consistently credited as penciller only, Lee would typically give him the freedom to fill in details of the plot as he saw fit. Lee explained "If I would tell Gene who the villain was and what the problem was, how the problem should be resolved and where it would take place, Gene could fill in all the details. Which made it very interesting for me to write because when I got the artwork back and had to put in the copy, I was seeing things that I'd not expected."

The 31-issue Lee/Colan run on the series included Daredevil #47, in which Murdock defends a blind Vietnam veteran against a frameup; Lee has cited it as the story he is most proud of out of his entire career. Colan argues that he was the first to introduce film noir influences to the series. With issue #51, Lee turned the writing chores over to Roy Thomas (who succeeded him on a number of Marvel's titles), but would remain on board as editor for another 40 issues.

Matt discloses his secret identity to his girlfriend Karen Page in a story published in 1969. However, the revelation proves too much for her, and she breaks off the relationship. This was the first of several long-term breakups between Matt and Karen, who remains a recurring character up until her death in the late 1990s.

=== Early 1970s: Gerry Conway era ===
18-year-old Gerry Conway took over as writer with issue #72, and turned the series in a pulp science fiction direction. Conway also moved Daredevil to San Francisco beginning with Daredevil #86, and simultaneously brought on the Black Widow as a co-star for the series.

Conway explained,

I'd just spent some time in San Francisco a month or two before, and I'd fallen in love with the city as a location. I thought the idea of Daredevil, who spent so much time leaping and diving from rooftop to rooftop, doing this in such a hilly city could make for spectacular visuals. I'll admit the idea of a blind hero jumping around the rooftops that gave Jimmy Stewart vertigo appealed to me as well. Also, it would allow him to be the costumed hero for an entire city, which would allow him to flourish without having to defer to more superpowered heroes like Spider-Man or the Fantastic Four.

Concerning the Black Widow, he said, "I was a fan of Natasha [Romanoff, the Black Widow], and thought she and Daredevil would have interesting chemistry."

The Black Widow served as Daredevil's crime-fighting ally as well as his lover from November 1971 to August 1975. Issues #92-107 were published under the title Daredevil and the Black Widow. Due to the Comics Code Authority's restrictions on the depiction of cohabitation, the stories made explicit that though Daredevil and the Black Widow were living in the same apartment, they were sleeping on separate floors, and that Natasha's guardian Ivan Petrovich was always close at hand. Conway introduced Black Widow as a romantic partner for Daredevil as "a way to re-energize the title". She joined the series in Daredevil #81 (1971). The series had been suffering from slowly declining popularity, and in November 1971 Marvel announced that Daredevil and Iron Man would be combined into a single series, but the addition of the Black Widow revitalized interest in the comic. John Romita Sr. designed a new costume for Black Widow based on the 1940s Miss Fury comic strip, but Colan was the artist for the series. Conway responded to feminist criticism by making Black Widow a more active and independent character, beginning in Daredevil #91 (1972). The series was retitled Daredevil and the Black Widow in the following issue; her name was dropped from the title after issue #107 (1973). Steve Gerber became the writer for Daredevil with issue #97 (1972). Sales had declined, and in response he re-emphasized Daredevil as the central character. Gerber initially scripted over Conway's plots, but Gene Colan's long stint as Daredevil's penciler had come to an end. Gerber recollected, "Gene and I did a few issues together, but Gene was basically trying to move on at that point. He'd just started the Dracula book, and he'd been doing Daredevil for God knows how many years. I think he wanted to do something else." After six issues with fill-in pencilers, including several with Don Heck, Bob Brown took over as penciller. Chris Claremont briefly wrote for the title in the mid-1970s. Jenny Blake Isabella became the writer for Daredevil with issue #118, and she believed that Daredevil and Black Widow should be split up. Black Widow departed from the series in issue #124, feeling overshadowed by Daredevil.

=== Mid-1970s: Marv Wolfman era ===
Jenny Blake Isabella succeeded Gerber as writer, but editor Len Wein disapproved of her take on the series and sent her off after only five issues, planning to write it himself. Instead, he ended up handing both writing and editing jobs to his friend Marv Wolfman with issue #124, which introduced inker Klaus Janson to the title. It also wrote the Black Widow out of the series and returned Daredevil to Hell's Kitchen; the post-Conway writers had all felt that Daredevil worked better as a solo hero, and had been working to gradually remove the Widow from the series. Wolfman's 20-issue run included the introduction of one of Daredevil's most popular villains, Bullseye. He was dissatisfied with his work and quit, later explaining, "I felt DD needed something more than I was giving him. I was never very happy with my DD—I never found the thing that made him mine the way Frank Miller did a year or two later. So I was trying to find things to do that interested me and therefore, I hoped, the readers. Ultimately, I couldn't find anything that made DD unique to me and asked off the title." His departure coincided with Bob Brown's death from leukemia.

Wolfman returned Daredevil to Hell's Kitchen. Wolfman promptly introduced the lively but emotionally fragile Heather Glenn to replace the Black Widow as Daredevil's love interest. Wolfman's 20-issue run included the introduction of one of Daredevil's most popular villains, Bullseye.

=== Late 1970s: Roger McKenzie era ===
With issue #144, Jim Shooter became the writer and was joined by a series of short-term pencilers, including Gil Kane, who had been penciling most of Daredevil's covers since #80 but had never before worked on the comic's interior. The series's once-solid sales began dropping during this period, and was downgraded to bi-monthly status with issue #147. Shooter still had difficulty keeping up with the schedule, and the writing chores were shortly turned over to Roger McKenzie.

McKenzie's work on Daredevil reflected his background in horror comics, and the stories and even the character himself took on a much darker tone. Daredevil battles a personification of death, and a re-envisioning of his Daredevil's origin shows him using stalker tactics to drive the Fixer to his fatal heart attack. McKenzie created chain-smoking Daily Bugle reporter Ben Urich, who deduces Daredevil's secret identity over the course of issues #153–163. Halfway through his run, McKenzie was joined by penciler Frank Miller, who had previously drawn Daredevil in The Spectacular Spider-Man #27 (February 1979), with issue #158 (May 1979).

In a story arc overlapping Wolfman, Shooter, and McKenzie's runs on the series, Daredevil reveals his identity to Glenn. Their relationship persists, but proves increasingly harmful to both of them. Though the Black Widow returns for a dozen issues (#155–166) and attempts to rekindle her romance with Daredevil, he ultimately rejects her in favor of Glenn.

=== 1980s: Frank Miller era ===
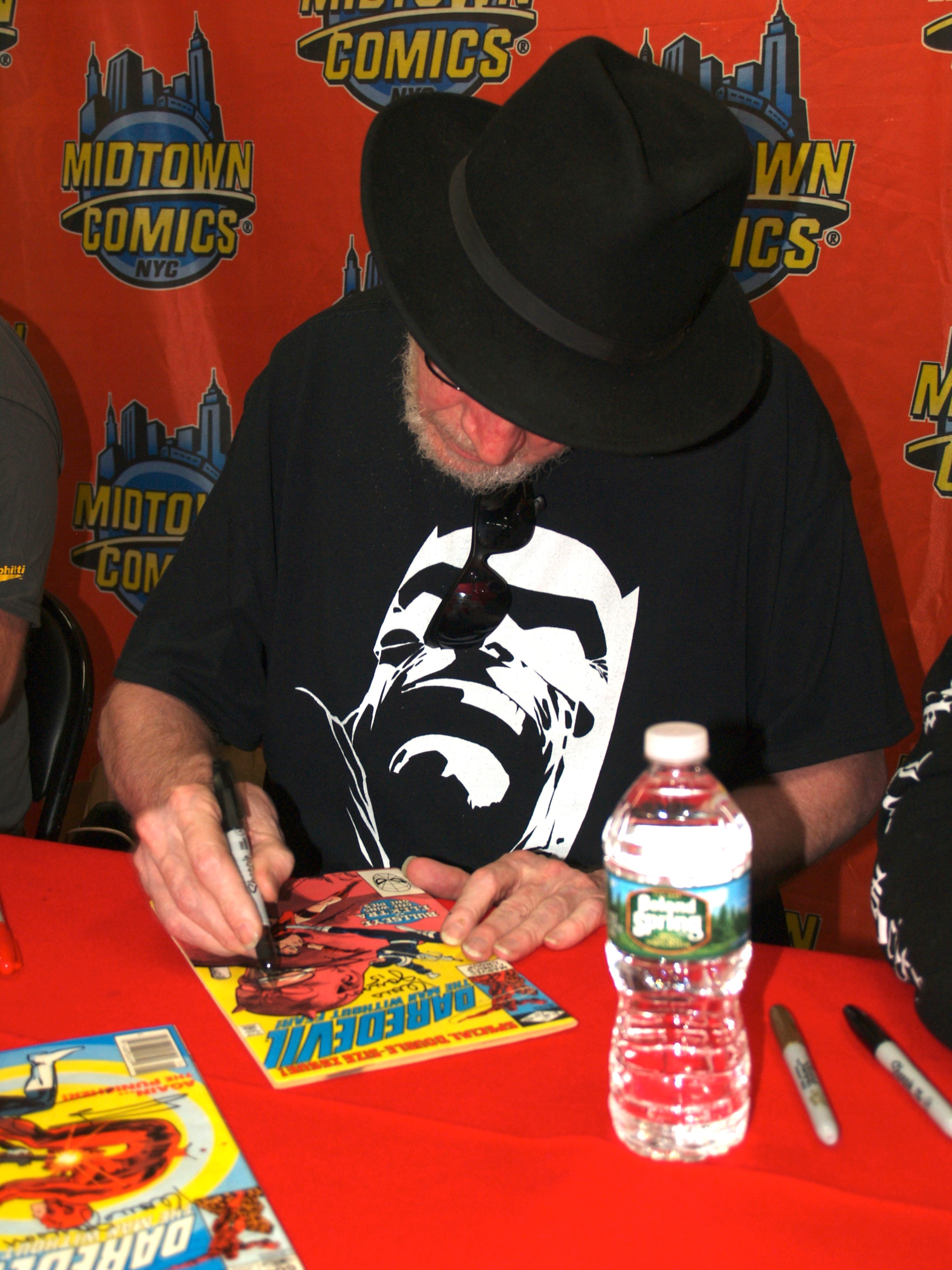
Frank Miller signing a copy of issue Vol. 1 #181 (April 1982), during an appearance at Midtown Comics in 2016

Sales had been declining since the end of the Wolfman/Brown run, and by the time Miller became Daredevil's penciler, the series was in danger of cancellation. Moreover, Miller disliked Roger McKenzie's scripts, and Jim Shooter (who had since become Marvel's editor-in-chief) had to talk him out of quitting. Seeking to appease Miller, and impressed by a short backup feature he had written, new editor Denny O'Neil fired McKenzie so that Miller could write the series. The last issue of McKenzie's run plugs a two-part story which was pulled from publication, as its mature content encountered resistance from the Comics Code Authority, though part one eventually saw print in Daredevil #183, by which time Code standards had relaxed.

In this period, Miller modeled Matt Murdock's appearance on the actor Robert Redford. Miller's initial run, first as penciler, then writer/penciler, and last a writer and layout artist begins in May 1979 and ends in February 1983. During this period, circulation doubled, to average sales of 276,812 copies per month. Comics historian Les Daniels noted that "Almost immediately, [Miller] began to attract attention with his terse tales of urban crime." Miller's revamping of the title was controversial among fans, but it clicked with new readers, and sales began soaring, the comic returning to monthly status just three issues after Miller came on as writer. The series made Miller a star in the industry. Miller took writing inspiration from hardboiled crime fiction as well as the superhero comic tradition. For example, he draws on techniques of suspense, dramatic irony, and ambiguous characterization adopted from Raymond Chandler. Miller moved away from the conventions of the commercially dominant genre of comic books, superhero comics, toward the style that interested him most: crime comics. He cited Will Eisner and Moebius, from the comics tradition, and filmmakers Orson Welles, Fritz Lang, and Alfred Hitchcock as inspirations. Miller is also responsible for emphasizing Daredevil's Catholic beliefs and deep concern with penance.

Resuming the drastic metamorphosis McKenzie began, Miller ignores much of Daredevil's continuity prior to his run on the series; on the occasions where older villains and supporting cast appear, their characterizations and history with Daredevil are reworked or overwritten. Most prominently, dedicated and loving father Jack Murdock is reimagined as a drunkard who physically abused his son Matt, entirely revising Daredevil's reasons for becoming a lawyer. Spider-Man villain Kingpin becomes Daredevil's new primary nemesis, displacing most of his large rogues gallery. Miller also introduced the Punisher to the series, a lethal vigilante previously created in The Amazing Spider-Man. Punisher serves a foil for Daredevil because he is motivated by vengeance rather than justice, and is willing to apply deadly force. However, tormented by guilt, Daredevil himself gradually becomes something of an antihero. In issue #181 (April 1982), he attempts to murder Bullseye by throwing him off a tall building; when the villain survives as a quadriplegic, he breaks into his hospital room and tries to scare him to death by playing a two-man variation on Russian roulette with a secretly unloaded gun.

Miller infused his first issue of Daredevil with his own film noir style. Miller sketched the roofs of New York in an attempt to give his Daredevil art an authentic feel not commonly seen in superhero comics at the time. Miller cited Will Eisner and Moebius, from the comics tradition, and filmmakers Orson Welles, Fritz Lang, and Alfred Hitchcock as inspirations. One journalist commented:

Daredevil's New York, under Frank's run, became darker and more dangerous than the Spider-Man New York he'd seemingly lived in before. New York City itself, particularly Daredevil's Hell's Kitchen neighborhood, became as much a character as the shadowy crimefighter; the stories often took place on the rooftop level, with water towers, pipes and chimneys jutting out to create a skyline reminiscent of German Expressionism's dramatic edges and shadows.

Following up a suggestion from O'Neil that he give Daredevil a realistic fighting style, Miller drew detailed fighting scenes attentive to the physics and techniques of East Asian martial arts. Miller introduced ninjas into the Daredevil canon, in particularly an evil army called the Hand. Miller created previously unseen characters who had played a major part in his youth: Stick, leader of the ninja clan, the Chaste, who had been Murdock's sensei after he was blinded; and Elektra, an on-again off-again girlfriend and sometime member of the Hand. Elektra was eventually killed by Bullseye, in a shocking and widely read issue that was one of the defining events of comics for the decade.

With #185, inker Janson began doing the pencils over Miller's layouts, and after #191 Miller left the series entirely. Miller's period of authorship was enormously commercially successful. He left the series in order to pursue the creative freedom offered him by Marvel's competitor, DC Comics, who hired him to write a creator-owned "prestige" series, Ronin. O'Neil switched from editor to writer. O'Neil was not enthusiastic about the switch, later saying "I took the gig mostly because there didn't seem to be (m)any other viable candidates for it." Janson left shortly after Miller, replaced initially by penciler William Johnson and inker Danny Bulanadi, who were both supplanted by David Mazzucchelli.

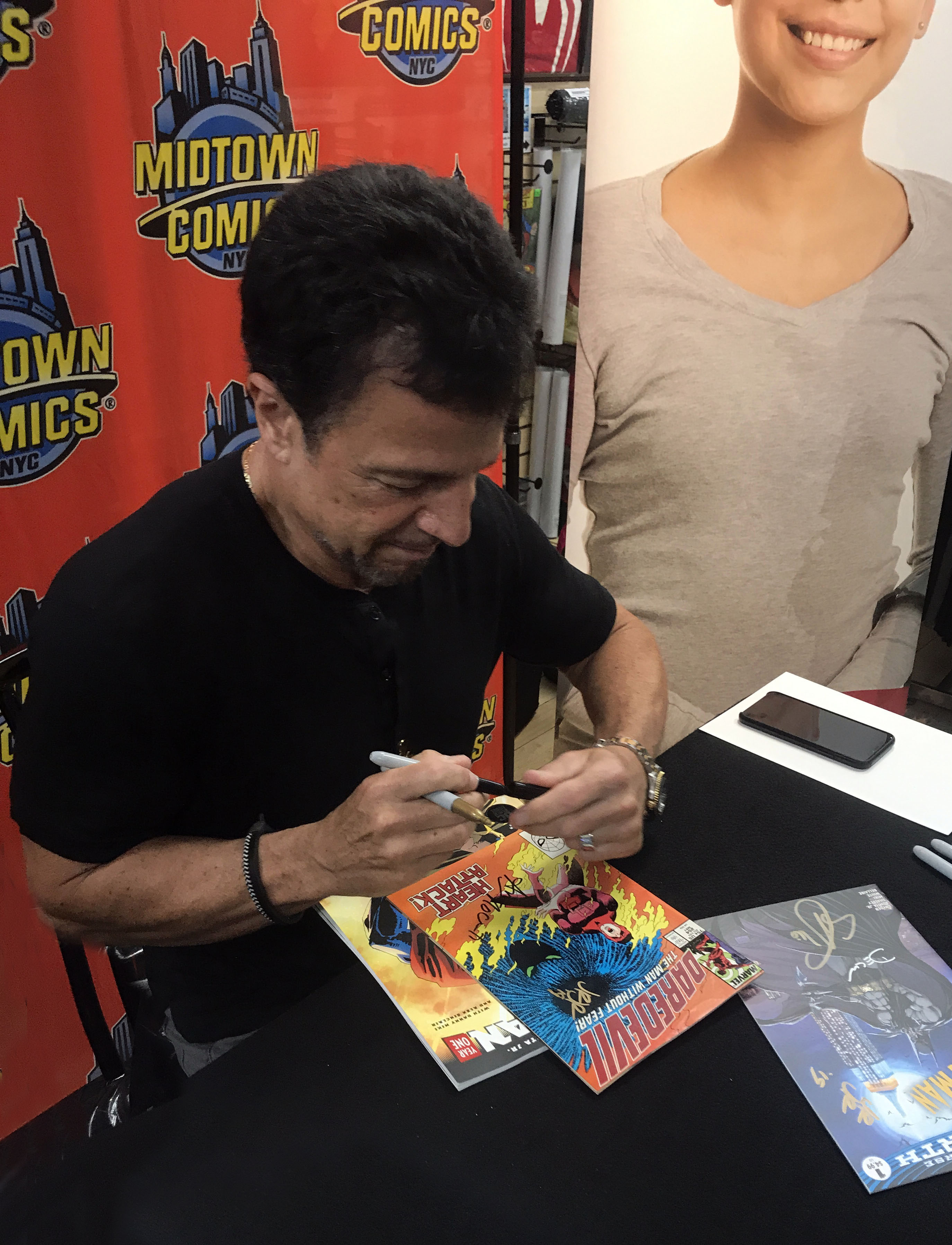
Artist John Romita Jr., signing a copy of issue 254 of the series at Midtown Comics in Manhattan

O'Neil continued McKenzie and Miller's noir take on the series, but backed away from the antihero depiction of the character by having him not only spare Bullseye's life but express guilt over his two previous attempts to kill him. In the period written by O'Neil, Heather Glenn eventually kills herself, in Daredevil #220 (March 1985).

Miller returned as the title's regular writer, co-writing #226 with O'Neil. Miller and artist David Mazzucchelli crafted the acclaimed "Born Again" storyline in #227–233. In the Born Again storyline, Karen Page returns as a heroin-addicted porn star, and sells Daredevil's secret identity for drug money. The Kingpin acquires the information and, in an act of revenge, orchestrates a frameup that costs Murdock his attorney's license. Murdock also discovers that his lost mother, Maggie, who he thought dead, is living as a nun. Miller ends the arc on a positive note, with Murdock reuniting with Karen Page. Miller intended to produce an additional two-part story with artist Walt Simonson but the story was never completed and remains unpublished. Miller's period of authorship was enormously commercially successful; his story arcs on Daredevil were the only sales competition for Chris Claremont's Uncanny X-Men, the consistent top seller in the 1980s.

Three fill-in issues followed before Steve Englehart (under the pseudonym "John Harkness") took the post of writer, only to lose it after one issue due to a plot conflict with one of the fill-ins.

=== Late 1980s: Ann Nocenti era ===
Ann Nocenti became the series's longest-running regular writer, with a four-and-a-quarter-year run from #238–291 (Jan. 1987 – April 1991). The shuffle of short-term artists continued for her first year, until John Romita Jr. joined as penciller from #250 to #282 (January 1988 – July 1990) alongside inker Al Williamson, who stayed on through #300. In this period, Murdock returns to law by co-founding with Page a nonprofit drug and legal clinic. Nocenti's stories wrestle with feminism, alcoholism, and animal rights. She introduced the antagonist Typhoid Mary, who became a recurring villain. Typhoid Mary has dissociative identity disorder; while her "Typhoid" identity is evil, her alter ego, Mary Walker, who dates Daredevil is sweet and reserved. Nocenti created Typhoid Mary after reflecting on experiences working in asylums for the mentally ill, about the condition of bipolar disorder, and about stereotypes regarding women in comic books. In Nocenti's storyline, Murdock becomes a drifter in upstate New York; this was the first time the character had been taken outside of an urban environment. She concludes her run with a positive turn in Murdock's fortunes: He returns to Hell's Kitchen, regains his sense of self, reconciles with Foggy Nelson, and resolves to seek out Karen Page.

=== 1990s: D.G. Chichester and return of Frank Miller ===
New writer D. G. Chichester continued from where Nocenti left off. In the early part of his run, Daredevil succeeds in toppling Kingpin from leadership of his criminal empire. This is a mirror of Miller's "Born Again", in which now it is Kingpin rather than Daredevil who is stripped of his power. Subsequent issues are devoted to more detailed description of the social environs of New York City. Beginning with issue #305 (June 1992), Scott McDaniel became the new series penciller. McDaniel's style was more exaggerated and melodramatic, in line with the most popular comics artists of the early 1990s, such as Todd McFarlane and Rob Liefeld.

Frank Miller returned to the character and his origins with the 1993 five-issue Daredevil: The Man Without Fear miniseries. With artist John Romita Jr., Miller expanded his retcon of the life and death of Murdock's father, "Battling Jack" Murdock, and Murdock's first encounters with the Kingpin and Foggy Nelson. The story fleshed out the role of Stick in the genesis of Daredevil, as well as the beginning of Murdock's doomed love affair with Elektra. In this rendition, Elektra is more dominant and active as a character, and more sexually aggressive. For this story, Miller and Romita cited Walter Mosley and Mickey Spillane as inspirations. Miller initially prepared the series as a scenario for a proposed TV series.

The creative team of Chichester and McDaniel returned with their "Fall From Grace" storyline in issues #319–325 (Aug. 1993 – Feb. 1994). According to Darius, in this period, McDaniel emulated Frank Miller's later style in the noir crime comic Sin City. Elektra, who was resurrected in #190 but had not been seen since, returns. An injured Daredevil creates a more protective costume from biomimetic materials, resembling motocross gear: red and gray with white armor on the shoulders and knee pads. His revamped billy clubs could attach to form nunchucks or a bo staff. His secret identity becomes public knowledge, leading to him fake his own death and assume the new identity of "Jack Batlin". This new identity and costume last for several story arcs. The later Chichester period has generally been dismissed by critics and fans as an example of sensationalistic "event comics" that had become typical in the 1990s. However, the series introduced some themes that were continually revisited later, such as Murdock's increasingly tenuous ability to keep his identity secret.

A short stint by J. M. DeMatteis returned Daredevil to his traditional red costume and Matt Murdock's identity. Under Karl Kesel, the title gained a lighter tone, with Daredevil returning to the lighthearted, wisecracking hero depicted by earlier writers. Matt and Foggy (who now knows of Matt's dual identities) join a law firm run by Foggy's mother, Rosalind Sharpe.

== Daredevil vol. 2 (1998-2011) ==
=== Late 1990s: Joe Quesada, Kevin Smith and David Mack ===
In 1998, Daredevil's numbering was rebooted, with the title "canceled" with issue #380 and revived a month later as part of the Marvel Knights imprint. Marvel was facing bankruptcy, and contacted Joe Quesada, the editor of an independent comics publisher called Event Comics. Event was successful despite the difficult market for the comics industry at the turn of the century, because its adventurous creative choices and respect for artists and writers. Daredevil was on the verge of cancellation because of low sales. Marvel outsourced four characters--Black Panther, Punisher, Inhumans, and Daredevil—to Event and gave them editorial control, under the name "Marvel Knights". Daredevil was the most established of the four; Quesada later said "We needed one character that we knew we could really do something with; that had a legacy. And that was Daredevil."

Quesada drew the first arc of the new series, "Guardian Devil" from 1998 to 1999, written by filmmaker Kevin Smith. Smith had previously made the comedic films Clerks, Mallrats, and Chasing Amy. Because of Smith's fame at the time, the series garnered high sales. Quesada says that Smith's authorship of the first arc of Daredevil, volume 2, "changed everything" and that this is "probably the single most important development in this particular era of comics, from the '90s to today." Quesada says this is because Smith was the first Hollywood director to write a mainstream superhero comic, and this encouraged subsequent authorship of comics by writers from film, TV, and literature. Smith's story depicts Daredevil struggling to protect a child whom he is told could be the Anti-Christ. Murdock experiences a crisis of faith exacerbated by the discovery that Karen Page has AIDS, which is later revealed to be a hoax. Page is subsequently murdered by Bullseye. Black Widow also returns to the series, and the two seem to resume their relationship. Daredevil eventually discovers that the true party responsible for the scheme is Mysterio, who is dying of cancer. He leaves Mysterio to commit suicide. Smith indicates that he was particularly influenced by Miller's earlier groundbreaking work on the character. Quesada says that his art was influenced by Art Nouveau and the work of Alphonse Mucha, in pictorial development of organic curves and shapes.

Smith was succeeded by writer-artist David Mack, who contributed the seven-issue "Parts of a Hole" (vol. 2, #9–15). Mack was previously known for his work on the experimental independent comic Kabuki. Mack generally follows a mixed media, collage approach which is very unusual in mainstream superhero comic books. Mack collaborated with Quesada to produce a hybrid with more conventional comic-book illustration. The arc introduced Maya Lopez, also known as Echo, a deaf martial artist. Critics have commended the character and the story as a complex and multifaceted portrayal of a disabled Latina and Indigenous superhero, and an unusual relationship for Daredevil.

=== Early 2000s: Jeph Loeb and Brian Michael Bendis ===
The 2001 Daredevil: Yellow miniseries, written by Jeph Loeb, presented another take on Daredevil's origins, purporting to illustrate letters written to Karen Page after her death. The series depicts the early rivalry between Matt Murdock and Foggy Nelson for Page's affection, and incorporates many events depicted in the earliest issues of Daredevil. The supervillains the Owl and the Purple Man appear as antagonists. In this story, Daredevil credits Page with coining the phrase "The Man Without Fear", and she suggests to Daredevil he wear all maroon instead of dark red and yellow.

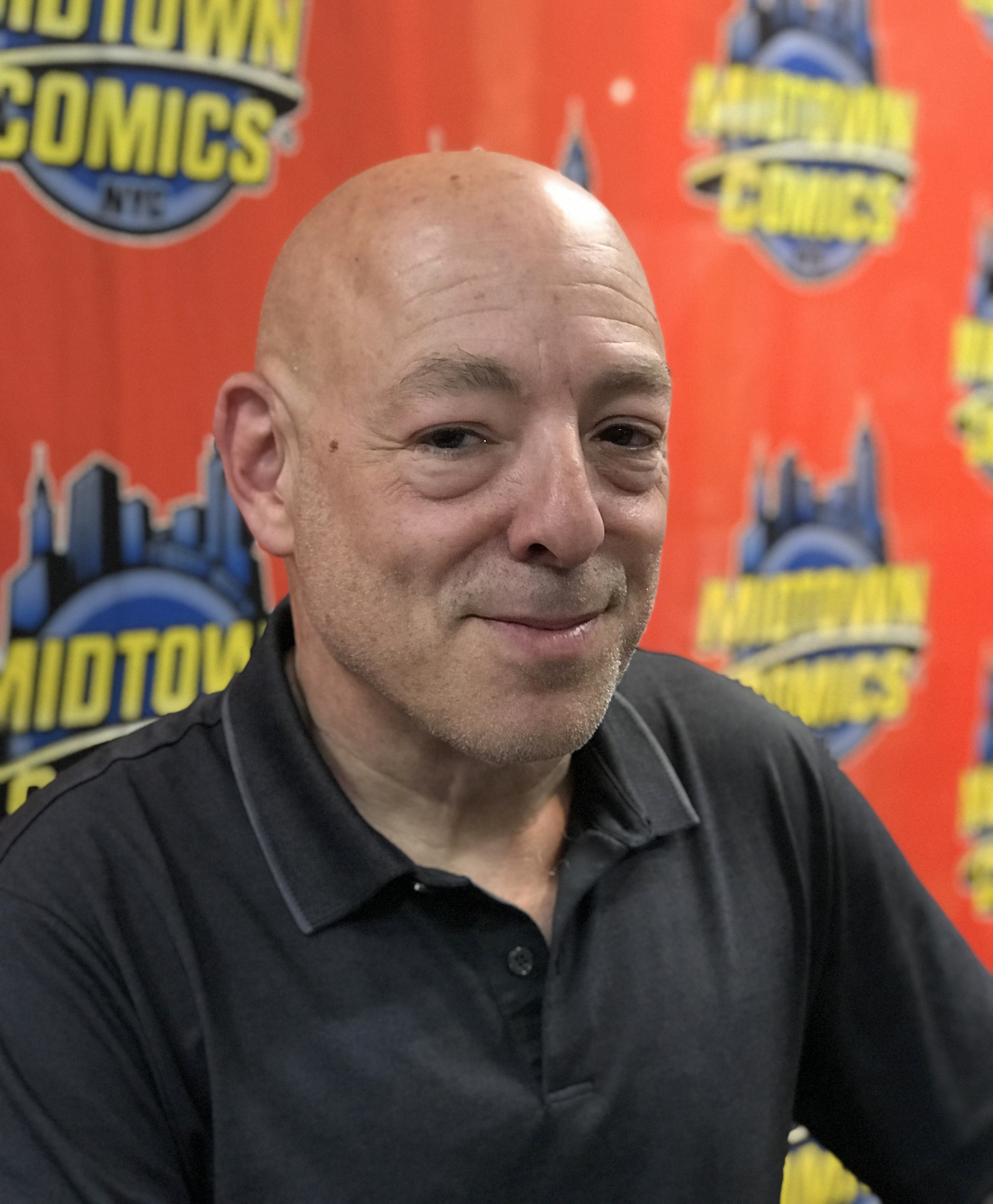
Brian Michael Bendis wrote a long run of Daredevil stories in the 2000s.

David Mack brought colleague Brian Michael Bendis to Marvel to co-write the following arc, "Wake Up" in vol. 2, #16–19 (May 2001 – August 2001), which follows reporter Ben Urich as he investigates the aftereffects of a fight between Daredevil and the new Leap-Frog, particularly on Leap-Frog's young son. After an interlude, Bendis resumed his arc in issue #26 (December 2001). In this run, Murdock meets his romantic interest and future wife Milla Donovan, who is also blind. Donovan later considers having the marriage annulled, on the grounds of Murdock's dishonesty. Bendis's storyline also explores the re-emergence of the Kingpin, the betrayal of him by his associates (including his own son), and vengeance for this betrayal enacted by his wife, Vanessa Fisk. Vanessa Fisk takes over the Kingpin's empire and sells it to gentrifiers and to real estate magnate Donald Trump. When Kingpin attempts to return to power, Daredevil beats him to the point of incapacity and declares himself a new "kingpin" of Hell's Kitchen, forbidding all criminal activity. In the Bendis and Maleev period, Daredevil's identity is leaked, first to the FBI and subsequently to the press. He becomes desperate to hold onto his increasingly tenuous secret identity, willing to make enormous sacrifices in service of this goal. At the conclusion of Bendis's storyline, Murdock is arrested and imprisoned alongside his adversaries, with the FBI hoping that he will be killed by his enemies. Bendis won an Eisner Award for Best Writer for his work on Daredevil, as well as other concurrent titles, in 2002 and 2003. Daredevil by Bendis and Maleev also won the Eisner for Best Continuing Series in 2003. Bendis says he was congratulated for this achievement by Frank Miller. However, Miller joked with him that the award was also his; Bendis responded that he was "glad that he knew I knew that without him, nothing we did would have existed."

=== Mid- to late-2000s: Ed Brubaker ===
The impact of the exposure of Murdock's identity as Daredevil continued as a plot point in storylines by the new creative team, writer Ed Brubaker and artist Michael Lark, beginning with Daredevil vol. 2, #82 (Feb. 2006). Brubaker says that, in his view, "Daredevil is one of the most experimental mainstream comics there is," and cites inspiration from noir fiction. Brubaker's arc begins with Murdock imprisoned. Another character masquerades as Daredevil in Hell's Kitchen. Murdock later discovers this ersatz Daredevil is his friend Danny Rand, the superhero Iron Fist. Brubaker re-introduced the classic villain Mister Fear and brought private investigator Dakota North into the series. Brubaker introduces the new characters Master Izo, another blind warrior who founded the Chaste centuries ago, and Lady Bullseye, a female admirer of the earlier nemesis. Brubaker's series also includes Lily Lucca, a new femme fatale manipulated by Mister Fear. Brubaker won Eisner Awards for Best Writer for his work on Daredevil and other titles in 2007, 2008, and 2010. IGN ranked Daredevil as the third best series from Marvel Comics in 2006. Comics critic Ryan K. Lindsay compares Brubaker's stories to the films of neo-noir and New Hollywood directors of the 1970s, such as Martin Scorsese, Roman Polanski, and Sam Peckinpah. At the conclusion of Brubaker's arc, Daredevil assumes leadership of the ninja army the Hand.

=== Late 2000s-early 2010s: Andy Diggle ===
In 2009, new writer Andy Diggle wrote a new story line in which Daredevil assumes leadership of the ninja army the Hand. This continued in a one-shot titled Dark Reign: The List – Daredevil.

In 2010, Daredevil continues to lead the Hand with the intent of transforming them into an organization that seeks justice. However, when Bullseye kills over a hundred people with a bomb, Daredevil and the Hand launch an onslaught of vengeance. In the ensuing arc, "Shadowland", Daredevil makes the city block that Bullseye destroyed into a fortress administered by the Hand. Murdock returns to his senses after a battle with Elektra and several superheroes. The story reveals that Murdock's erratic behavior is caused by a demonic possession. Purged of the demon by his allies, Murdock departs New York, and becomes the leading character of a new miniseries titled Daredevil: Reborn. He leaves his territory in the hands of the Black Panther in the briefly retitled series' Black Panther: Man Without Fear #513.

== Daredevil Vol. 3 and 4 (2011-2015): Mark Waid era ==
In July 2011, Daredevil relaunched with vol. 3, written by Mark Waid. Waid focuses on the character's powers and perception of the physical world. According to Manning, the Waid period also emulates Stan Lee's earlier, more light-hearted tone, recalling the earlier work of Kesel. Waid includes more sombre undercurrents, such as his suggestion that "the idea that Matt would be suffering from a severe depression that he masks with a swashbuckling style." He introduces a new love interest for Murdock, fellow lawyer Kirsten McDuffie. During Waid's series, Daredevil's true identity is an open secret, although he maintains a veneer of denial. Waid won the Eisner Award for Daredevil in 2012. Daredevil vol. 3 ended at issue #36 in February 2014.

Waid and Chris Samnee followed this up with Infinite Comics' Daredevil: Road Warrior weekly digital miniseries, which focused on an adventure during Matt's trip to San Francisco. It was reprinted as issue 0.1 in Daredevil volume 4, which launched under Waid and Samnee with a new issue #1 (March 2014) as part of the All-New Marvel NOW! storyline centered on Matt's new life in San Francisco. Daredevil volume 4 ended with issue #18 in September 2015.

== Daredevil Vol. 5 (2015-2019): Charles Soule era ==
A new volume began as part of the All-New, All-Different Marvel branding, written by Charles Soule with art by Ron Garney with the first two issues released in December 2015. In this series, Matt returns to New York, where he now works as an Assistant District Attorney. Flashbacks in a later story arc reveal how Murdock regained his secret identity: Supernatural entities alter the memory of everyone on earth except Foggy Nelson. Timothy Peters describes this plot twist as "fantastically ludicrous" but necessary in order to set up the future plot machinations that depend on the social discrepancy of a secret identity. Peters views the subsequent storyline as an intriguing illustration of contemporary expectations and perceptions about the legal system. Using his restored secret identity, Murdock is able to take advantage of a subsequent court case to establish a precedent for superheroes testifying in court without the need to expose their secret identities. Despite interference from the Kingpin, Murdock succeeds in taking this precedent to the Supreme Court so that all superheroes will have the same rights in future cases. Soule himself has a law background, adding verisimilitude. Soule's series also introduces a new black costume for Daredevil, and a new crime-fighting partner, Blindspot. Soule also created the new villain Muse. He later collaborated with Phil Noto on the Death of Daredevil arc. In Soule's tenure, Kingpin becomes Mayor of New York City, a plot point that continues into stories written by his successor.

== Daredevil Vol. 6 and 7 (2019-2023): Chip Zdarsky era ==
In February 2019, the series began a brand-new volume written by Chip Zdarsky and with art primarily by Marco Checchetto. In this story, Kingpin becomes Mayor of New York, which advantages criminals over heroes.

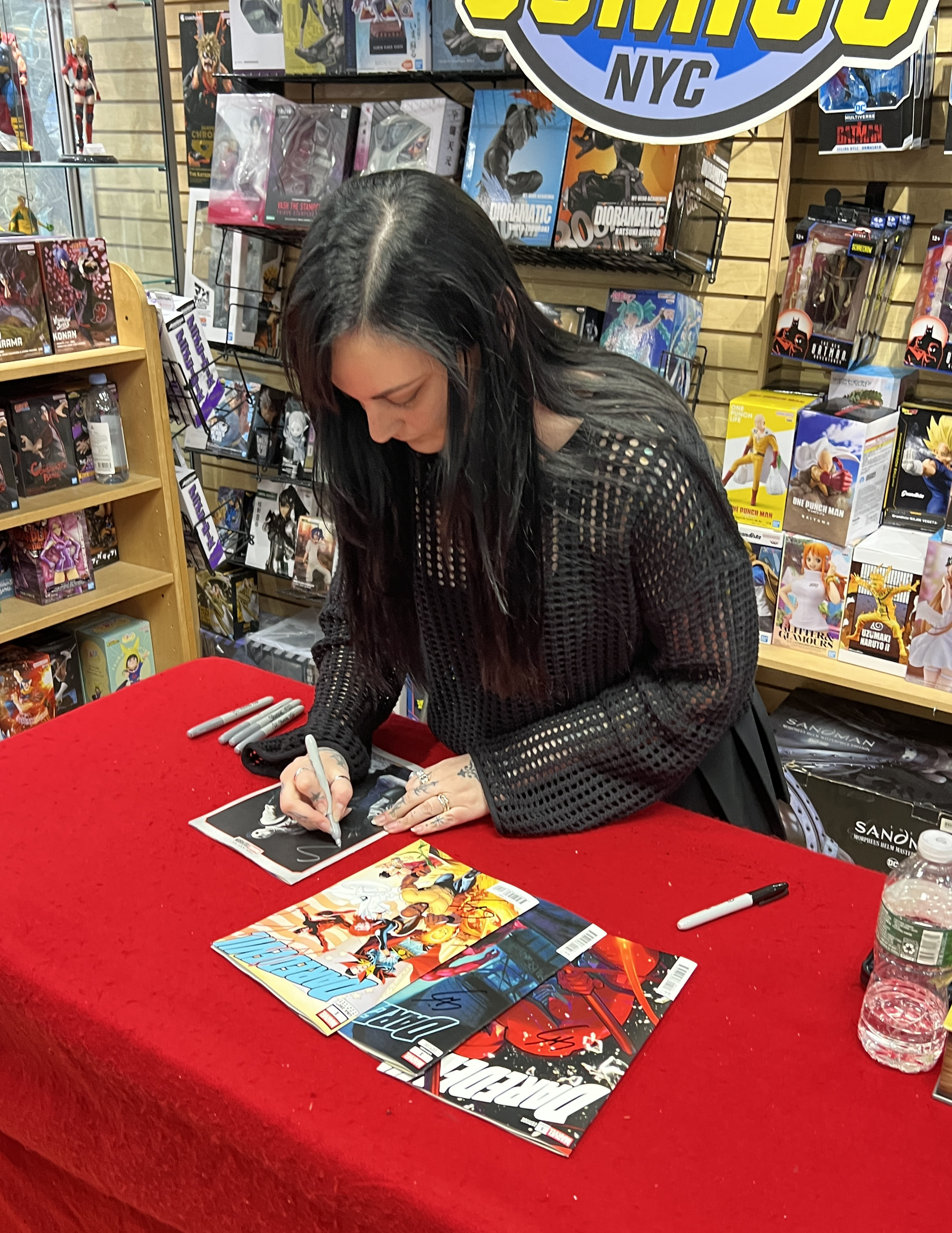
Writer Stephanie Phillips signing copies of the debut issue of Volume 9 of the series at an April 2026 appearance at Midtown Comics in Manhattan

In Zdarsky's run Daredevil temporarily quits his superhero activities out of guilt after killing a thief accidentally. When a team of villains invades Hell's Kitchen, he returns to fight alongside Elektra and ordinary citizens who have collectively adopted the "Daredevil" identity. In the aftermath of the battle, he gives himself up to police custody. He continues to conceal his face with his mask, stating that he wants to stand trial for his crimes but will only do so on the condition that his identity is never revealed. He voluntarily confesses to the killing and is sentenced to a prison term. While Matt serves his time, Elektra takes up the Daredevil costume and protects Hell's Kitchen at his behest. In the prison, Murdock grapples with the idea that Daredevil and Matt Murdock work together to put people in prison, which he comes to see as ruining people's lives without reforming them or setting them on the right path. Zdarsky was nominated for an Eisner Award for his writing on this series.

In August 2021, it was confirmed that volume 6 of the series would end in November 2021, with issue #36. The series lead into the crossover storyline "Devil's Reign" with the same creative team.

Following the conclusion of that series, another Daredevil series, also written by Zdarsky, was launched in July 2022. In May 2023, it was announced that the series would conclude with issue #14 in August 2023.

== Daredevil Vol. 8 and 9 (2023-present) ==
In September 2023, Marvel launched an eighth volume of the series with writer Saladin Ahmed and artist Aaron Kuder. The opening story arc establishes that Matt Murdock has become a priest, and explores the conflict that arises from his fact that, as AIPT's Christopher Franey put it, "being a holy man who dresses as the devil but fights for the truth." The series ran for 25 issues, ending in 2025. It holds an average 7.9 out of 10 rating at the review aggregator website Comic Book Roundup.

In November 2025, Marvel announced that Stephanie Phillips would write a ninth volume of the series with artist Lee Garbett. The series, which follows Matt Murdock as he becomes a law professor at Empire State University while facing a new enemy named Omen, debuted on April 1, 2026 to positive reviews. The comic was printed with multiple variant covers, and would be available in "True Believers Blind Bags" in which buyers would discover either one of the issue's regular variant covers or the Blind Bag exclusive covers by surprise artists. These included artists Frank Miller, and Alex Maleev, whose covers were signed by actors Charlie Cox and Jon Bernthal, who had reprised their roles as Daredevil and the Punisher in the Daredevil: Born Again television series, the second season of which had premiered on March 24.

== Reception ==
Empire praised Frank Miller's era, and referenced Brian Michael Bendis, Jeph Loeb, and Kevin Smith's tenures on the series.

In 2023, Comic Book Resources ranked Daredevil as the 13th-best Marvel superhero, but said it had the best overall comic runs because "writers have been able to craft their vision as intended, which isn't always possible with more well-known titles".

The series has also won the following awards:

- Daredevil #227: "Apocalypse", Best Single Issue – 1986 Kirby Awards
- Daredevil: Born Again, Best Writer/Artist (single or team), Frank Miller and David Mazzucchelli – 1987 Kirby Awards
- Daredevil: The Man Without Fear, Favorite Limited Comic-Book Series – 1993 Comics Buyer's Guide Fan Award
- Daredevil by writer Brian Michael Bendis and artist Alex Maleev, 2003 Eisner Awards (for works published in 2002)
- Daredevil, Best Writer, Ed Brubaker – 2007 Harvey Award
- Daredevil #7, Best Single Issue (or One-Shot) – 2012 Eisner Awards (for works published in 2011)
- Daredevil by Mark Waid, Marcos Martín, Paolo Rivera, and Joe Rivera, Best Continuing Series – 2012 Eisner Awards
- David Mazzucchelli's Daredevil Born Again: Artist's Edition, edited by Scott Dunbier (IDW), Best Archival Collection – 2013 Eisner Awards
- Chris Samnee, Daredevil v3, Best Penciller/Inker – 2013 Eisner Awards

== Collected editions ==
Daredevil's comic series has been collected into many trade paperbacks, hardcovers and omnibuses.
