= Jack Murdock (character) =

Publication information
- Publisher: Marvel Comics
- First appearance: Daredevil #1 (April 1964)
- Created by: Stan Lee (writer); Bill Everett (artist)

In-story information
- Full name: Jonathan Murdock
- Species: Human
- Place of origin: Earth
- Partnerships: Maggie Murdock
- Supporting character of: Matt Murdock (son); Mike Murdock (magic son)
- Notable aliases: Jack Murdock, Battlin' Jack, The Devil, Kid Murdock
- Abilities: Trained athlete; Professional boxer

Jonathan "Jack" Murdock is a fictional character appearing in American comic books published by Marvel Comics. He was a professional championship Boxer in his day; as well as being the father of Matthew "Matt" Murdock (Daredevil) and his magically created twin brother Michael "Mike" Murdock, and the ex-husband of Maggie Murdock. Jack Murdock was murdered by men of a local gangster, The Fixer (AKA Roscoe Sweeney), when he refused to throw a fight in front of his son Matt, while Jack was working in secret for the Fixer as one of his thugs. After his Father is murdered, it inspires Matt to use hyper sense powers along with his Martial Arts training to avenge his father's murder as the Superhero Daredevil. Jack Murdock was created by writer-editor Stan Lee and artist Bill Everett. The character first appeared in Daredevil #1 (April 1964).

He has been portrayed by Scott L. Schwartz in Spider-Man (2002) and David Keith in Daredevil (2003). Jack Murdock was also portrayed by John Patrick Hayden in the first and third seasons of the Marvel Television production streaming television series Daredevil, set in the Marvel Cinematic Universe (MCU).

== Publication history ==
Jack Murdock first appeared in Daredevil #1 and was created by Stan Lee and Bill Everett.

== Fictional character biography ==
Born Jonathan Murdock, he went by Jack for short, and lived an average life in New York. He eventually met and fell in love with a woman named Maggie Grace, which led to the birth of a son, Matt. Although their life was good together, Maggie eventually divorced him and went on to join a convent, becoming a nun.

Jack did not want Matt growing up hating his mother for leaving them and decided to tell him she died when he was little. From then on, Jack raised Matt as a single parent by becoming a boxer while doing the best that he could to support Matt.

As time went by, Jack found it hard to support his son on boxing alone and ended up going to a local mobster named Roscoe Sweeney, known as the Fixer because he fixed boxing matches for profit. Jack made an agreement with him: Jack would be one of his enforcers, and in return, Sweeney would fix his fights so that Jack would win and make more money.

When Matt sees his father roughing up someone for money to give to the Fixer, he flees in shock and is involved in a car accident where he saves an old blind man from being hit by a truck carrying radioactive chemicals. Matt is blinded by the chemicals, but develops superhuman senses. Heartbroken, Jack vows to never work for the Fixer again and helps Matt adjust to his blindness, unaware of his powers.

Matt soon enters college and law school, studying to become a lawyer, while Jack continues to work as a boxer. Unfortunately, Jack becomes involved with Roscoe Sweeney again when he returns to town. Sweeney reveals that he had secretly rigged Jack's boxing matches over the years to ensure his victory. Sweeney pays Jack to lose his next match, but he refuses to do so and wins the fight. In retaliation, Sweeney has Jack killed.

== Alternate versions ==
=== Daredevil Noir ===
From Daredevil Noir April, 2009 a man named Orville Halloran was hired to kill Jack Murdock for not agreeing to throw a fight in the ring when he was told to.

=== Ultimate Marvel ===
Jack Murdock maintains the same role in the Ultimate Comics as he does in the 616 continuity.

=== What If? ===
In What If? Daredevil became an Agent of S.H.I.E.L.D.?, Matt Murdock becomes an agent of S.H.I.E.L.D. after Nick Fury offers to help with deal with his blindness and newly acquired superpowers. Jack Murdock is never killed and is kidnapped by Hydra forces before Matt rescues him.

In What If? Daredevil's Dad Had Thrown The Big Fight?, Jack survived his final fight when he went along with the deal to take a dive. As an adult, Jack's son Matt becomes a boxer himself and is forced to work for Wilson Fisk. Fisk orders Matt to take a fall in his next fight, but Matt refuses and wins the fight. In retaliation, Fisk has Jack Murdock killed.

=== Daredevil: End of Days ===
The past history of Jonathan Murdock on Earth-12121 mirrors that of his Earth-616 counterpart.

== Powers and abilities ==
Jack Murdock had no superhuman abilities. But he was a trained athlete and professional boxer with good stamina which he continued to maintain even as he grew older.

== In other media ==
=== Television ===
- Jack Murdock appears in a flashback in the Spider-Man: The Animated Series episode "Framed". This version was forced into crime as one of the Kingpin's thugs. After his son Matt is blinded by radioactive chemicals being transported by the Kingpin, a grief-stricken Jack vows to bring the Kingpin to justice. However, he is killed by the Kingpin's men in the process.
- Jack Murdock appears in series set in the Marvel Cinematic Universe (MCU), portrayed by John Patrick Hayden. First appearing in flashbacks depicted in the first season of Daredevil (2015), he reappears in the Daredevil: Born Again episode "Gloves Off" via archival footage.

=== Film ===
- An unnamed wrestler who appears in Spider-Man (2002), portrayed by an uncredited Scott L. Schwartz, is identified as Jack Murdock in the film's novelization.
- Jack Murdock appears in Daredevil (2003), portrayed by David Keith. This version, also known as the Devil, worked as an enforcer for local mobster Eddie Fallon. He is later killed by the Kingpin after refusing to take a dive in one of Fallon's matches.
