= Maggie Murdock =

Publication information
- Publisher: Marvel Comics
- First appearance: Daredevil #229 (April 1986)
- Created by: Frank Miller; David Mazzucchelli

In-story information
- Full name: Margaret Grace Murdock
- Species: Human
- Place of origin: Earth
- Partnerships: Jack Murdock
- Supporting character of: Matt Murdock (son); Mike Murdock (magic son)
- Notable aliases: Sister Maggie, Maggie Murdock, Maggie Grace
- Abilities: Skilled at Medical first aid

Margaret Grace "Maggie" Murdock is a fictional character appearing in American comic books published by Marvel Comics. She is a Nun of the local church down in New York City, as well as the ex-wife of Jack Murdock and the mother of Matt Murdock who grew up to become the superhero known as Daredevil and his magically created twin brother Michael "Mike" Murdock. Maggie Murdock was created by writer-editor Frank Miller and artist David Mazzucchelli. The character first appeared in Daredevil #229 (April 1986).

Maggie Grace was portrayed by Joanne Whalley and Isabella Pisacane in the third season of the Marvel Television production series Daredevil, set in the Marvel Cinematic Universe (MCU).

== Creation ==
Sister Maggie Murdock was created by Frank Miller and David Mazzucchelli, first appearing in Daredevil #229 in 1986.

== Fictional character biography ==
Sister Maggie (Maggie Murdock, née Maggie Grace) is the mother of Matthew Murdock, aka Daredevil. She and Jack had Matt when they were a young couple, but Maggie soon suffered from postpartum depression, having doubts, feeling constantly anxious regarding Matt's safety, thoughts which soon developed into self-loathing, feeling estranged, as she considered herself to be a bad mother. Eventually her depression led to paranoia, which was revealed to be post-natal depression. She began losing control of herself and started thinking that Jack was plotting against her, and that Matt was there to tear them apart. One night, under the influence of her mental illness, Maggie tried to assault the baby. Jack managed to stop her; Maggie broke down and hugged her husband not knowing what to do with her illness that she brought to the family. As soon as she came to her senses, she finally realized that she needed to leave for her husband and son's sakes. She soon packed her bags and ran from home, where she was taken in by a church, becoming a nun and started going by Sister Margaret. With the help of doctors and counseling, she recovered from her depression. She never came back to the Murdock residence because she didn't want to take the chance of threatening them again.

As an adult, Matt reunited with Maggie during a time when Kingpin, having learned that Matt was Daredevil, engineered the ruin of his life on several levels. Nearly broken after trying to get revenge, Murdock was taken in by Sister Maggie and with his enhanced senses, immediately felt the connection between them but he never knew that she was his mother. However, when he asked her flatly if she was his mother, Maggie calmly smiled and denied this but in her heart she couldn't believe that she had a reunion with her son but didn't know how to tell him the truth. Matt, who had 'read' Maggie's reaction to his question with his abilities, knew she was lying, but not why. During this period of recovery, Maggie also briefly met Matt's friend and ally, Spider-Man, who was shocked by how broken Matt was. For some time after, Maggie was a figure in Matt's life.

Years later, while caring for a baby girl he suspected of being the Antichrist, he almost threw the baby off the roof of building trying to kill it but soon realized he was wrong and plunged off the roof, saving her and himself, ending up in front of the Church where Sister Maggie lived. Daredevil brought her to Sister Maggie at the Clinton Mission Shelter and slept for two days in her room. While he slept, she cleaned his costume and cared for the infant. When Matt woke up, Maggie greeted him and offered him some food. After talking, Matt got her to finally admit that she was his mother. She noted the similarities between him and his father, but told him she had no answers for why she had left him so many years before. When he questioned all the problems he had had in life and told her that God had let her off pretty easily, she slapped him across the face, and he dropped to his knees and apologized. They talked for hours about Maggie's life before becoming a nun, she then encouraged him to ask God for answers about the baby, telling him that after all of his experiences in the supernatural that he should have no problem believing in God. He questioned how she could be so confident in her faith, and she told him a story about a knight and a monk. Maggie then advised Matt to talk to Karen Page, who was waiting for him downstairs in the sanctuary.

Matt soon went out as Daredevil again and met up with Dr. Strange to find out if Mephisto had any involvement with the baby, and soon battled with Bullseye, sent by Mysterio to retrieve the baby, at the Shelter. Maggie and the others refused to tell him where the baby was, so he killed Maggie's fellow nuns' Sister Theresa and tortured Sister Anne, but Maggie kept the baby hidden. When Daredevil returned, Maggie told him what happened, and then Bullseye appeared and attacked him. While the two battled, Karen Page showed up soon after, Maggie and Karen spoke quietly thinking of a plan and offered the baby to Bullseye in exchange for not killing Daredevil, whom he had shot and now had at his mercy. Karen tricked him, delivering a baby doll instead, while Maggie tried to escape out the door with the real baby. Bullseye dropped Karen with the doll and then snatched the real baby from Maggie and raised Daredevil's Billy club to kill Karen, but Karen had grabbed his discarded gun and demanded he stop. Bullseye mocked her, as the gun only had a single bullet, doubting that she could aim it right and pull the trigger; he then hurled the billy club at Daredevil to kill him instead, but Karen leaped into its path and was killed when it went through her chest. After that Bullseye took the baby and left. Daredevil soon tracked down the baby to Mysterio, who revealed he had drugged Daredevil making him hallucinate about the baby being the antichrist to try to break him using the baby to manipulate him. Eventually Daredevil overcame him and saved the baby, while Mysterio committed suicide in the process.

Maggie met up with Matt at the hospital where he visited the baby girl making sure the baby was looked after; Maggie herself was still banged up from her recent trauma and using a walking stick for support. They discussed everything that happened and what the baby means to Matt and how Mysterio's attacks affected him. Maggie told Matt that the authorities had arranged for the baby to be adopted and said the baby needed a name. Matt suggested calling her Karen in Karen Page's honor. Maggie finally confessed why she left, she didn't leave because of herself, she left for the sakes of her husband and her son, she felt that she is no good to anyone. Maggie was emotional and she was sorry that she had not been there for her son Matt. Matt and Maggie hugged and reconciled. Maggie later attended Karen's funeral and comforted her son and she wanted Matt's permission to be a part of her son's life from then on.

== Powers and abilities ==
Sister Maggie has some skills in medical first aid, and as a nun presumably well-versed in Roman Catholic theology, Roman Catholicism and Hagiography.

== Other versions ==
In What If vol.2 #2 (April 1989), Sister Maggie cared for Karen Page when she arrived at the church seeking help from a man named Paulo Scorcese and her own drug abuse. Paulo came to the church; Sister Maggie begged Paulo to leave but instead he killed Karen in front of her.

In Daredevil: End of Days #7 (April 2013), her history is seemingly the same as her original version.

In What If? vol.2 #73 (March 1995), Sister Maggie attended her late husband's Jack Murdock's funeral.

In Spider-Gwen, Maggie does not abandon Jack or Matt and the pair raise them together, with Maggie becoming a paralegal and aspiring actress. However, she is instead hit by the same truck of chemicals that blinds Matt, leaving her comatose.

== In other media ==
Joanne Whalley as Maggie Grace in Daredevil

Maggie Grace Murdock appears in the third season of Daredevil, portrayed primarily by Joanne Whalley and by Isabella Pisacane in flashbacks.
