= List of The Spectacular Spider-Man episodes =

Episodes of the animated series The Spetacular Spider-Man

The Spectacular Spider-Man is an American animated television series based on the Marvel Comics character, Spider-Man, produced by Culver Entertainment, Adelaide Productions and Sony Pictures Television in association with Marvel, and developed for television by Greg Weisman and Victor Cook. In terms of tone and style, the series is based principally on the Stan Lee/Steve Ditko/John Romita Sr. era of The Amazing Spider-Man comics, with a similar balance of action, drama and comedy as well as a high school setting. However, it also tends to utilize material from all eras of the comic's run and other sources such as the Ultimate Spider-Man comics by Brian Michael Bendis and Mark Bagley and the Spider-Man trilogy directed by Sam Raimi. The series premiered on March 8, 2008 during the Kids' WB programming block of The CW, and its second season aired on Disney XD in the United States, and ended its run on November 18, 2009, while the entire series was broadcast in Canada on Teletoon.

The series is broken up into loose arcs, each consisting of three to four episodes that take place roughly over a month within the series. According to Weisman, the series is themed around the "education of Peter Parker", with the episode titles in each arc being taken from specific fields of study.

== Series overview ==
| Season | Episodes | Originally released | | |
| Season | Episodes | First released | Last released | Network |
|---|---|---|---|---|
| 1 | 13 | March 8, 2008 | June 14, 2008 | The CW |
| 2 | 13 | June 22, 2009 | November 18, 2009 | Disney XD |

== Episodes ==
=== Season 1 (2008) ===
The first three episodes are named after notions in biology, the next three are named after ones in economics, the following three are terms in chemistry, while the final four are notions in psychology.

| No. overall | No. in season | Title | Directed by | Written by | Original release date | Prod. code |
|---|---|---|---|---|---|---|
Biology 101
| 1 | 1 | "Survival of the Fittest" | Victor Cook | Greg Weisman | March 8, 2008 | 101 |
As Peter Parker's junior year of high school begins, his superhero ego, Spider-Man, must stop the Vulture from exacting revenge on Norman Osborn for stealing his inventions and defeat the Enforcers, who have been hired by the Big Man of Crime to eliminate Spider-Man.
| 2 | 2 | "Interactions" | Troy Adomitis | Kevin Hopps | March 15, 2008 | 102 |
Peter reluctantly attempts to tutor Liz Allan, a member of his school's cheerleading squad, while, as Spider-Man, he must stop Max Dillon who, following an accident at the ESU Labs, has become Electro and threatens Curt Connors to restore him back to normal.
| 3 | 3 | "Natural Selection" | Dave Bullock | Matt Wayne | March 22, 2008 | 103 |
Peter and Spider-Man must both learn to face their choices when Connors transforms into the Lizard, putting his family in danger.
Economics 101
| 4 | 4 | "Market Forces" | Dan Fausett | Andrew Robinson | March 29, 2008 | 104 |
While Peter takes on the responsibility of helping Aunt May pay the bills, Montana, one of the Enforcers, becomes the Shocker to fulfill his contract with the Big Man: eliminating Spider-Man.
| 5 | 5 | "Competition" | Troy Adomitis | Kevin Hopps | April 5, 2008 | 105 |
As Peter and his best friend Harry Osborn try out for the school's football team, Spider-Man must face recurring convict Flint Marko, who has become the supervillain Sandman after an experiment run by Norman Osborn and Otto Octavius with the Big Man's funding.
| 6 | 6 | "The Invisible Hand" | Dave Bullock | Matt Wayne | April 12, 2008 | 106 |
As Peter struggles to get a date for Midtown High's Fall Formal, Alex O'Hirn, Marko's former partner-in-crime, becomes the Big Man's latest creation, the Rhino, and seeks revenge on Spider-Man for putting him behind bars. Spider-Man finally discovers the Big Man's identity, Tombstone, but is unable to do anything about it due to his public persona of philanthropist L. Thompson Lincoln.
Chemistry 101
| 7 | 7 | "Catalysts" | Victor Cook | Andrew Robinson | April 26, 2008 | 107 |
While Peter attends Midtown High's Fall Formal with his neighbor Mary Jane Watson as his date, a mysterious new villain called the Green Goblin aims to replace Tombstone as the Big Man and destroy Spider-Man.
| 8 | 8 | "Reaction" | Jennifer Coyle | Randy Jandt | May 3, 2008 | 108 |
Peter and Spider-Man learn that their actions have consequences when Otto Octavius becomes the supervillain Doctor Octopus following a lab accident caused by the Green Goblin. Spider-Man must prevent Doc Ock from obtaining an experimental battery pack that can keep his mechanical arms functioning indefinitely.
| 9 | 9 | "The Uncertainty Principle" | Dave Bullock | Kevin Hopps | May 10, 2008 | 109 |
On Halloween night, while Colonel John Jameson struggles to land his damaged space shuttle, Spider-Man has his final battle with the Green Goblin, who has kidnapped Tombstone's second-in-command, Hammerhead, to force the former to surrender to him. Peter faces his biggest challenge yet when he discovers the Goblin's true identity.
Psychology 101
| 10 | 10 | "Persona" | Dan Fausett | Matt Wayne | May 17, 2008 | 110 |
Spider-Man encounters master thief Black Cat while attempting to stop her from stealing an alien symbiote that attached to John Jameson's space shuttle and was taken to ESU for analysis. The symbiote ends up bonding with Spider-Man, granting him a new black suit with enhanced abilities. Meanwhile, the Chameleon, a master of disguises, impersonates Spider-Man during a crime spree, forcing the real Spider-Man to join forces with Black Cat to stop him.
| 11 | 11 | "Group Therapy" | Dave Bullock and Jennifer Coyle | Andrew Robinson and Greg Weisman | May 31, 2008 | 111 |
With Electro's help, Doctor Octopus breaks himself, Vulture, Shocker, Sandman, and Rhino out of Ryker's Island to quench their mutual revenge on Spider-Man. Even with his new black suit, Spider-Man finds his old enemies, now called the Sinister Six, are more than he can handle.
| 12 | 12 | "Intervention" | Dave Bullock | Greg Weisman | June 7, 2008 | 112 |
With Aunt May in the hospital and his friendship with Eddie Brock ruined, Peter finally gains enough self-awareness to realize the symbiote is negatively affecting his personality. The struggle between Peter and the symbiote evolves into a war within Peter's own mind, where Peter is aided by the spirit of his late Uncle Ben.
| 13 | 13 | "Nature vs. Nurture" | Victor Cook | Kevin Hopps | June 14, 2008 | 113 |
As Aunt May is released from the hospital, Eddie Brock, now transformed into Venom after bonding with the symbiote, seeks revenge on Peter by targeting his loved ones, including May and Gwen Stacy, drawing Spider-Man into motion to defeat him.

=== Season 2 (2009) ===
The first four episodes are named after notions from engineering, the next three are named after ones in human development, the following three are terms in criminology, while the final three are drama terminologies.

| No. overall | No. in season | Title | Directed by | Written by | Original release date | Prod. code |
|---|---|---|---|---|---|---|
Engineering 101
| 14 | 1 | "Blueprints" | Jennifer Coyle | Kevin Hopps | June 22, 2009 | 201 |
While Peter struggles to find the proper opportunity to talk to Gwen about their first kiss, Spider-Man must face a new supervillain, the self-proclaimed sorcerer Mysterio. Mysterio is ultimately unmasked as Quentin Beck, a special effects expert and former henchman of the Chameleon, though unbeknownst to Spider-Man, Beck was only following the instructions of a criminal mastermind known as the Master Planner.
| 15 | 2 | "Destructive Testing" | Kevin Altieri | Matt Wayne | June 22, 2009 | 202 |
While Peter is conflicted over his choice to be with either Gwen or Liz, Kraven the Hunter comes to New York in search of his ultimate prey: Spider-Man. After being defeated during their first battle, Kraven enlists Professor Miles Warren's help to even the odds by transforming him into the "ultimate hunter", with unforeseen consequences.
| 16 | 3 | "Reinforcement" | Mike Goguen | Andrew Robinson | June 29, 2009 | 203 |
Near Christmas Day, the Master Planner reconstitutes the Sinister Six with Vulture, Electro, Sandman, Rhino and new members Mysterio and Kraven to destroy Spider-Man once and for all. Meanwhile, Peter finds his wandering eye prevents him from being with Gwen.
| 17 | 4 | "Shear Strength" | Jennifer Coyle | Randy Jandt | July 6, 2009 | 204 |
On New Year's Eve, the Master Planner and the new Sinister Six kidnap Gwen to coerce her father, police captain George Stacy, into giving them high level clearance, allowing the Planner to effectively run the world. Spider-Man, determined to foil the Planner's scheme, takes the fight to his secret lair, where he discovers the villain's true identity and must rescue Gwen.
Human Development 101
| 18 | 5 | "First Steps" | Kevin Altieri | Kevin Hopps | July 13, 2009 | 205 |
While Peter unexpectedly gets invited to his rival Flash Thompson's birthday party, Spider-Man must face the Sandman once again, who is attempting to pull off his big score by robbing an oil tanker. Peter also witnesses Harry's return from Europe, following the revelation of his identity as the Green Goblin, and begins to fear the possibility of Venom returning.
| 19 | 6 | "Growing Pains" | Mike Goguen | Nicole Dubuc | July 20, 2009 | 206 |
Eddie Brock, re-bonded with the Venom symbiote after following Peter to its hidden location, frames Spider-Man for a crime spree to ruin his reputation. Meanwhile, spores from the symbiote infect John Jameson, giving him superhuman strength. J. Jonah Jameson encourages his son to become a superhero, but because of Venom's actions, John comes to see Spider-Man as a menace and becomes determined to destroy him.
| 20 | 7 | "Identity Crisis" | Jennifer Coyle | Andrew Robinson | July 27, 2009 | 207 |
Peter's secret identity as Spider-Man has been outed by Venom, leaving Peter and his loved ones vulnerable to his enemies. Spider-Man has his final battle with Venom, where he must find a way to separate Eddie and the symbiote once and for all. Meanwhile, reporter Ned Leeds interviews Peter's acquaintances and Spider-Man's villains to determine whether the two could truly be one and the same.
Criminology 101
| 21 | 8 | "Accomplices" | Kevin Altieri | Nicole Dubuc | October 7, 2009 | 208 |
A gang war looms as Silver Sable, Hammerhead, and Doctor Octopus vie for a prize that could change the balance of power in the New York underworld. Spider-Man finds himself in the thick of this fray and must rely on the unexpected help of Rhino to defeat them.
| 22 | 9 | "Probable Cause" | Mike Goguen | Kevin Hopps | October 14, 2009 | 209 |
Peter winds up on a Midtown High police car ride with his schoolmate Sally Avril, who has an intense dislike for him but slowly warms up to him. As Spider-Man, he must once again face off against the Enforcers—Shocker, Fancy Dan, and Ox—who have been enhanced with new equipment by the Tinkerer.
| 23 | 10 | "Gangland" | Jennifer Coyle | Andrew Robinson | October 21, 2009 | 210 |
On Valentine's Day, Peter jeopardizes his relationship with his girlfriend Liz when Tombstone, Doctor Octopus, and Silvermane call a Valentine's Day Summit. But when Hammerhead betrays them all in an attempt to become the new Big Man, the summit erupts into a gang war that only Spider-Man can stop before it escalates further.
Drama 101
| 24 | 11 | "Subtext" | Kevin Altieri | Nicole Dubuc | November 4, 2009 | 211 |
Determined to be a better boyfriend to Liz, Peter attempts to help her brother Mark as Spider-Man. But when Mark relapses into his gambling addiction and ends up in debt, Green Goblin transforms Mark into Molten Man and blackmails him into fighting Spider-Man, with Liz and Mary Jane becoming caught in the crossfire.
| 25 | 12 | "Opening Night" | Mike Goguen | Greg Weisman | November 18, 2009 | 212 |
Spider-Man volunteers to test the new security system of a prison called the Vault. When the Green Goblin hacks the system and releases all of the inmates, Spider-Man finds himself hunted by some of his greatest enemies and must work with Black Cat and her imprisoned father, Walter Hardy, to contain them. In the process, Spider-Man faces a shocking revelation about Uncle Ben's death.
| 26 | 13 | "Final Curtain" | Victor Cook | Kevin Hopps | November 18, 2009 | 213 |
Peter breaks up with Liz to finally be with Gwen, but the latter struggles to end her relationship with Harry. Meanwhile, Spider-Man attempts to solve the mystery of the Green Goblin's identity with Harry's help and has his final battle with the villain, with wide-ranging consequences for both Peter and Spider-Man.
