= The Uncertainty Principle (The Spectacular Spider-Man) =

- The Spectacular Spider-Man episode
- Goblin threatens Hammerhead in a steel mill.
- Episode no.: Season 1 Episode 9
- Directed by: Dave Bullock
- Written by: Kevin Hopps
- Production code: S1E09
- Original air date: May 10, 2008

Episode chronology
← Previous "Reaction"	Next → "Persona"

"The Uncertainty Principle" is the ninth episode of the animated television series The Spectacular Spider-Man, which is based on the comic book character Spider-Man, created by Stan Lee and Steve Ditko. It originally aired on the Kids WB! programming block on The CW Network on May 10, 2008.

The episode chronicles Spider-Man on Halloween, as he partakes in his final battle with the villain Green Goblin and finally discovers the villain's true identity. Meanwhile, Air Force Colonel John Jameson attempts to land his badly damaged space craft back on Earth. The episode was written by Kevin Hopps and directed by Dave Bullock. Hopps researched all the available comic books he had that featured Green Goblin in order to prepare his penning of the episode's teleplay. "The Uncertainty Principle" served as a conclusion to the Green Goblin storyline for the first season. In the context of the episode, the title refers not to chemistry, but rather the confusion regarding the Goblin's identity.

The supposed revelation of Goblin's identity in the episode would later be disproved by the second-season finale "Final Curtain", which the writers had planned since the series began. "The Uncertainty Principle" is available on both the third volume DVD set for the series, as well as the complete season box set. The episode received a generally positive critical response from television critics—reviewers singled out elements such as the Halloween motif and Mary Jane's vampire costume.

== Plot summary ==
On the night before Halloween, Green Goblin gases and kidnaps Hammerhead, taking him to a steel mill. The Goblin tries to convince him to join his ranks, but Hammerhead refuses as his loyalty lies solely with the "Big Man", Tombstone. Later, Goblin confronts Tombstone and steals a jump drive he is carrying, declaring that he can take it back from him later that night before he sails off on his glider. Spider-Man spots him and they begin to juggle. Goblin reveals that he possesses the jump drive stolen from Tombstone and that he can have it later that night, before kicking him off his glider.

Spider-Man tries to catch up with him and notices him sneaking into his friend Harry's apartment. Sneaking in, he spots Harry's father Norman coming out of a secret passageway and theorizes that Norman is the Goblin. Spider-Man is forced to slip out after Harry walks in, and misses Harry drinking an experimental, drug-like formula. A short while later, Peter Parker calls Harry and invites him to a Bleecker Street Halloween carnival with Gwen, Mary Jane and Liz Allan. Harry accepts the invitation. On his way to the carnival, Peter attempts to sell Spider-Man photographs to Daily Bugle editor J. Jonah Jameson, but he refuses and tells him to try selling them to the Globe.

Goblin breaks into OsCorp when Norman is talking with investors and steals an inhibitor prototype. Peter arrives at the carnival, still dressed as Spider-Man, but everyone assumes it is just his costume and applauds him for it. Peter slips out after spotting fireworks caused by the Goblin erupting in the sky. He follows them to a steel mill, where he finds Tombstone. The two enter together, and find Goblin has Hammerhead suspended over a vat of molten metal. The Goblin reveals that the jump drive is fake. Goblin readjusts his focus on Tombstone and Spider-Man, who are forced to team up to fight the villain. While accusing Goblin of being Norman Osborn, Spider-Man uses his webs to reflect one of the villain's pumpkin bombs back at him. A limping Goblin escapes on his injured glider and Spider-Man follows him to the Osborn apartment. Spider-Man finds an amnesiac Harry in changing out of the costume, just as Norman arrives. It is revealed that Harry, in an effort to impress his father, has been drinking a prototype performance enhancer dubbed "Globulin Green". Harry, after lashing out at his father, collapses, and Norman comes to the conclusion that after overhearing his father's conversations with Tombstone, Harry's subconscious created the identity of the goblin to take Tombstone down. Initially intending to frame himself as the Goblin, Spider-Man instead tells Norman to take care of his son, and leave the identity of the Goblin an unsolved mystery. The next day, Peter learns that Mary Jane has transferred to his high school, and that Harry is taking an extended leave to get better.

Meanwhile, while orbiting the Earth during a routine space mission with his crew, John Jameson and his ship are hit by a meteor shower. John struggles to return the ship to Earth, but eventually lands it at Cape Canaveral. The next day, Jonah learns that the Globe's cover story on the Goblin's rampage—featuring Peter's photos—is outselling the Bugle's story on John's journey. An infuriated Jameson decides to meet with the public's demand by publishing a new cover story questioning if Spider-Man is a hero or a menace. Meanwhile, John is interviewed at the shuttle hangar when he spots black goo on the bottom of the shuttle.

== Production ==
"The Uncertainty Principle" was written by Kevin Hopps and directed by Dave Bullock. It originally aired on the Kids WB! block for The CW on May 10, 2008, at 10:00 a.m. Eastern/Pacific Time. It proceeded a repeat of the episode "Catalysts", which marked the introduction of Green Goblin into the series. The episode's title, "The Uncertainty Principle", expands the series theme "The Education of Peter Parker" chosen by developer Greg Weisman. Episodes in the third season one arc all shared a naming scheme based on chemistry.

Hopps, who had previously written for animated series such as Buzz Lightyear of Star Command, Justice League, and Darkwing Duck, researched for the episode by re-reading every comic book that featured Green Goblin. Hopps notes that "you might consider him [Green Goblin] crazed, but he's truly brilliant and has thought things out far in advance. He's always several steps ahead of where you think he is. So while I'm writing Goblin, I'm always trying to keep in mind where he's going next". While penning the fight sequence between Goblin and Spider-Man, Hopps paid close attention to brawls detailed in "Catalysts" in order to better grasp "how we could make it different and really up the stakes".

The episode served as the conclusion of the Green Goblin storyline for the first season that started with "Catalysts". In the climax, Spider-Man supposedly discovers that Harry has been the Goblin the whole time after stealing the experimental Goblin formula from OsCorp. The second season finale, "Final Curtain", would disprove this revelation and explain that Norman was in fact the actual Green Goblin and he had pitted the blame on his son after learning he had been taking the formula secretly. The episode also revealed that the Chameleon had been impersonating Norman so he could secretly be the Goblin without raising suspicion. The writers had planned the revelation since the series began.

"The Uncertainty Principle" became available on the DVD The Spectacular Spider-Man, Volume 3, on March 17, 2009, alongside the episodes "Catalysts" and "Reaction". The volume featured episodes that detailed Green Goblin as a prominent character. "The Uncertainty Principle" also became available on the full season DVD box set entitled The Spectacular Spider-Man: The Complete First Season DVD Review, which featured every other episode of season one.

== Reception ==
"This was an especially busy installment of Spectacular Spider-Man - It's amazing how much this show packs into 22 minutes."

— Eric Goldman,
IGN reviewer

"The Uncertainty Principle" received critical acclaim. Eric Goldman of IGN gave the episode an 8.8. ("Great") rating. He enjoyed Mary Jane's "sexy" vampire uniform and the large, three-way battle between Tombstone, Goblin, and Spider-Man, writing that it was "one hell of a fun fight" and "amazing". Goldman opted that the supposed reveal of Goblin's true identity could possibly be false based on the original comic book story and noted that Jonah's hatred of Spider-Man that was formed in the episode was "perhaps the most understandable and best way it's ever been portrayed before".

Writing for DVD Talk, reviewer Justin Felix considered setting the episode on Halloween to be "a nice touch". Tim Janson of Mania named it among the best episodes of the season, describing it as "a Halloween episode complete with a gothic setting". Ultimate Disney reviewer Luke Bonanno did not include the episode among his top five episodes of The Spectacular Spider-Man's first season, but "feel[s] obligated to point out that the uniform excellence of the lot [makes] this a challenging task".

Daniel Dockery of Cracked.com ranked it fourth on his list of "The 5 Best Halloween Episodes You Should Watch Tonight." He felt it "broke with the established formula and gave us a more thoughtful Halloween episode," and described the Green Goblin as "a playful and sadistic jerk." Daniel Dockery of Vulture praised the creators for combining the mystery of who the Green Goblin was with Harry's drug addiction to "maintain the intrigue when the audience already anticipated the scream."
