= Catalysts (The Spectacular Spider-Man) =

- The Spectacular Spider-Man episode
- Green Goblin executes an attack on Spider-Man. In keeping with the show's color scheme, Green Goblin's costume emphasized the color green to coincide with negative aspects in Peter's life.
- Episode no.: Season 1 Episode 7
- Directed by: Victor Cook
- Written by: Andrew Robinson
- Production code: S1E07
- Original air date: April 26, 2008

Episode chronology
← Previous "The Invisible Hand"	Next → "Reaction"

"Catalysts" is the seventh episode of the animated television series The Spectacular Spider-Man, which is based on the comic book character Spider-Man, created by Stan Lee and Steve Ditko. The episode sees Spider-Man trying to stop the psychotic supervillain Green Goblin from bombing a dinner party filled with high-class New York citizens on the night of his school's big Fall Formal.

Written by Andrew Robinson and directed by the series' co-developer Victor Cook, "Catalysts" marked the first appearance of Green Goblin in the series. The villain's design followed the show's color scheme by emphasizing the color green and was based primarily on initial designs by Alex Ross for the character in the 2002 film Spider-Man. Performers Steven Blum and Vanessa Marshall began their roles as Green Goblin and Mary Jane Watson, respectively.

The episode originally broadcast on April 26, 2008, following repeat episodes of "Natural Selection" and "Competition". It is available on both the third volume DVD set for the series, as well as the complete season box set. It ranked as among the highest rated children's telecast the morning it aired and received a generally positive response from television critics. Green Goblin's appearance and personality split critics, who felt that it was suitable but strayed from his comic counterpart.

== Plot ==
On the night of Midtown High's Fall Formal, Harry Osborn arrives with his date Glory and some football players, along with their dates, in a stretch limousine. When his friend, Gwen Stacy, tries to greet him, he ignores her and goes on his way. Soon, Peter Parker arrives and stuns everyone with his attractive date, Mary Jane Watson, whom he introduces to the group. Flash Thompson tries to ruin the date by mentioning a bet he and Peter had. Mary Jane is unscathed by the idea of the bet and goes to dance. Harry goes to get drinks and overhears Glory getting back together with her ex-boyfriend. He is furious and goes to his locker where he drinks a vial of green formula.

Meanwhile, across town, the Green Goblin breaks into an Oscorp laboratory and steals several pieces of equipment, including a glider. With the equipment, Goblin flies off and attacks a group of thieves who are working for the "Big Man". He uses some stolen money as incentive for them if they work for him and they accept. Now armed with personal terrorists, he crashes and holds up a dinner party orchestrated by the "Big Man" in his alter ego as philanthropist L. Thompson Lincoln. Lincoln is unimpressed and sics his guards on the Goblin and his terrorists, but they are defeated easily. John Jameson tries to fight them, too, but is also taken down.

Peter is contacted by the Daily Bugle to go take photographs of the hold-up at the party and is forced to leave Mary Jane, who understands as it is his job. Peter arrives at party as Spider-Man, where he is greeted by Lincoln. At first, Spider-Man thinks Goblin is simply working for the "Big Man" but is confirmed otherwise. Goblin briefly tries to convince Spider-Man to join him but is turned down so the Green Goblin makes it his mission to kill Spidey. so the two proceed to fight. Spider-Man shoots a web at the Goblin's glider and is immediately defenestrated. His web fluid is out, but he refuels and is pursued through the streets by Green Goblin. He finally defeats Goblin, wrapping him in webbing. The Goblin explains that a pumpkin bomb was hidden back at the black-tie event. When Spider-Man returns to find it, John Jameson opts that the pumpkin bomb is hidden in the chandelier and Spider-Man retrieves it. He launches the bomb into the sky and it harmlessly explodes. However, when Spider-Man goes back to arrest the Green Goblin, he has mysteriously disappeared.

Back at the dance, Harry's group is outside and take the assumption that they have been abandoned by Harry because he has not showed up. In actuality, Harry is hiding at the wall near them and takes another drink of the vial of formula before walking off. Soon after, Peter returns to find the dance almost abandoned except for Mary Jane, who is dancing with another boy. Downtrodden, he is reassured when Mary Jane walks up to him and tells him that she saved the last dance for him.

== Production ==
"Catalyst" was written by Andrew Robinson and directed by Victor Cook, a producer and developer of The Spectacular Spider-Man. It originally aired on the Kids WB! block for The CW on April 26, 2008, at 10:00 a.m. Eastern/Pacific Time, with a parental guidance rating of TV-Y7-FV. It was preceded by repeats of the episodes "Natural Selection" and "Competition", and was the first new episode of the series to air after a two-week hiatus following the episode "The Invisible Hand". The episode's title, "Catalysts", expands the series theme "The Education of Peter Parker" chosen by developer Greg Weisman. Episodes in the third season one arc all shared a naming scheme based on chemistry.

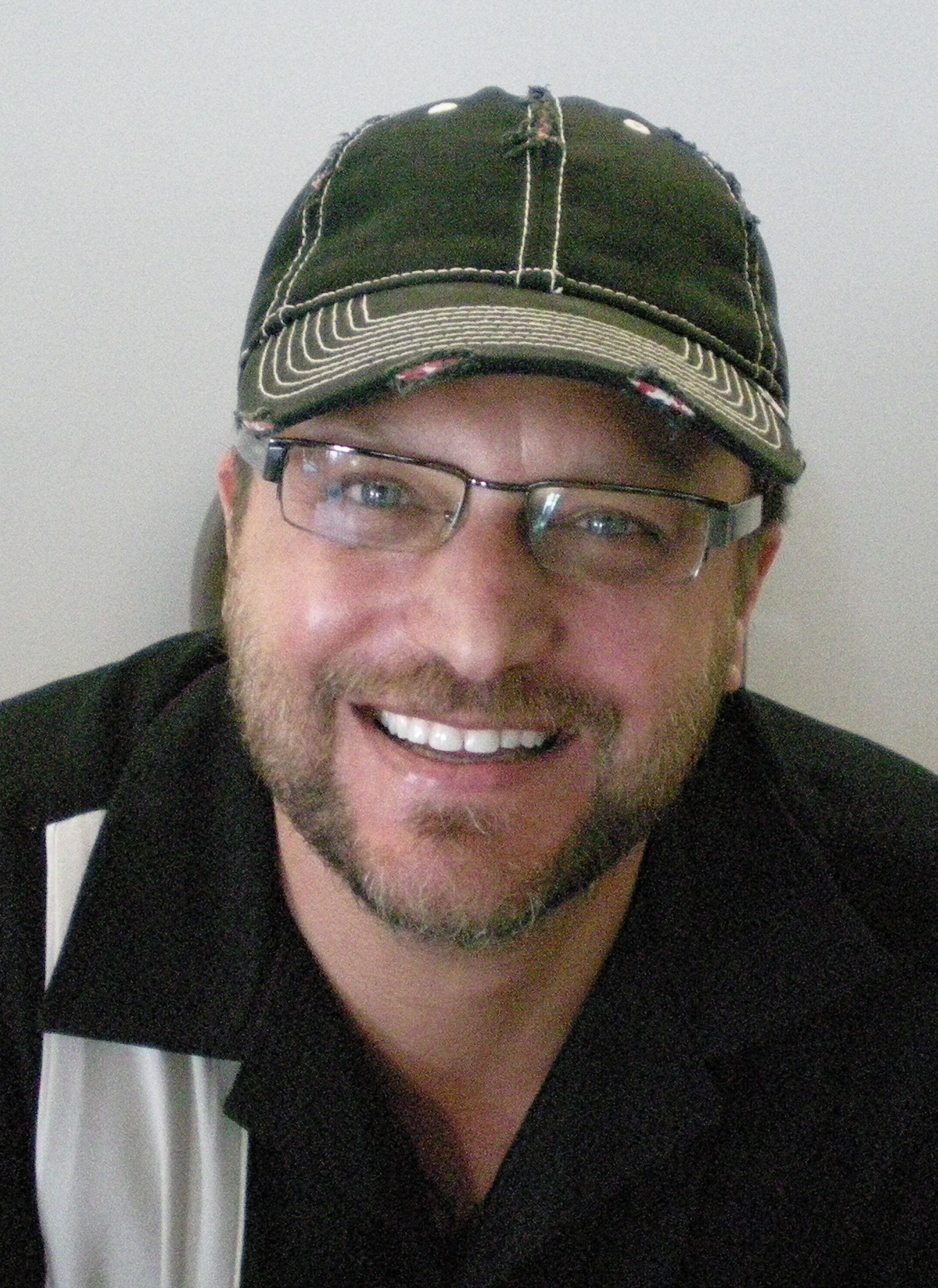
Steve Blum voiced Green Goblin.

Green Goblin's costume was mainly designed after his original comic book appearance. The basic structure was based on initial designs drawn by Alex Ross for the Goblin as he appeared in the 2002 film Spider-Man, which was never used. Alterations were made to make it resemble Medieval clothing. The suit displays the color green, which, in Cook's broad color scheme for the series, is used to symbolize negative situations in Peter's life, while positive settings and occurrences, such as Peter's biology class, feature other key colors like yellow.

Green Goblin was voiced by Steve Blum. Blum has starred in several different video games and animated series as a voice actor and, at the time of the episode's broadcast, had been about to star as the titular character of the then-forthcoming animated series Wolverine and the X-Men on Nicktoons Network.

Mary Jane was voiced by Vanessa Marshall. Marshall has voice acted on several animated series and video games, as well as starring in commercials and other on-screen roles and performing stand-up comedy. Marshall was filming a Honda commercial when her agent, Cathey Lizzio, called her to confirm that she had landed the role as Mary Jane, simply saying, "Hello, is this Mary Jane?". Overjoyed, Marshall dropped to her knees and began hyperventilating, which worried the producers of the commercial. Marshall's mother, Joan Van Ark, had voiced Spider-Woman in the original 1980s Spider-Man animated series, though Marshall's interest in Spider-Man had dated back to reading the comic books in her youth. On her character, Marshall noted that she is "incredibly complex:"

Her strength plays a major part in Peter's growth and maturation – she really keeps him on the straight and narrow. Even though our characters are still only in high school during this cartoon, and you're not going to get a lot of that character development at this point of the series, I know it's going to be there in the future and so that has an effect on how I play her now.

"Catalysts" became available on the DVD The Spectacular Spider-Man, Volume 3, on March 17, 2009, alongside the episodes "Reaction" and "The Uncertainty Principle". The volume featured episodes that detailed Green Goblin as a prominent character. It became available on the full season DVD box set entitled The Spectacular Spider-Man: The Complete First Season DVD Review, which featured every other episode of season one.

== Reception ==
In its initial broadcast, "Catalysts" was met with season-high Nielsen ratings, meeting well with all demographics and ranking as one of the highest rated children's telecast for any network that morning.

The episode received generally positive reception from television critics. Eric Goldman of IGN, gave it an 8.0 ("Impressive"), writing that "[w]hile not among the very best episodes, this was still another fun and involving installment of the show". Goldman gave a mixed response about Green Goblin — noting that he is "perhaps a bit hyper sensitive on how he's portrayed" — considering the design, while similar to the comics, be more of an exact version of it; Goldman considered the character's personality was "a bit too evocative of the Joker", the iconic villain from DC's Batman comics, but believed that his "malice side" worked. On the topic of Mary Jane, Goldman praised her for being "much like Stan Lee created her – a quick witted, fun loving girl". He also applauded the mysterious factors of Green Goblin's true identity.

Sean Elliot, editor for iF magazine, gave the episode an "A". He wrote in his review that Goblin was "[t]rue to his early years in the comic books" and was "handled with superb finesse". Elliot noted that the storyline with Peter and Mary-Jane going to the Fall Formal together made him nostalgic of the old comic books that had the pair involved, whereas current publications do not. Similar to Goldman, Elliot applauded the mystery of Goblin's true identity, which he described as a "bait and switch".

Writing for DVD Talk, Justin Felix wrote that "Catalyst" was a "fun episode - although the teen histrionics at the school dance are a bit much". Ultimate Disney reviewer Luke Bonanno did not include the episode among his top five episodes of The Spectacular Spider-Man's first season, but "feel[s] obligated to point out that the uniform excellence of the lot [makes] this a challenging task".
