= The Invisible Hand (The Spectacular Spider-Man) =

- The Spectacular Spider-Man episode
- Rhino interrogates J. Jonah Jameson on Peter Parker's location. A deleted scene which never made it into the final draft of "The Invisible Hand" featured Rhino searching for Parker by looking his name up in the phone book before going to Jameson.
- Episode no.: Season 1 Episode 6
- Directed by: Dave Bullock
- Written by: Matt Wayne
- Production code: S1E06
- Original air date: April 12, 2008

Episode chronology
← Previous "Competition"	Next → "Catalysts"

"The Invisible Hand" is the sixth episode of the animated television series The Spectacular Spider-Man, which is based on the comic book character Spider-Man created by Stan Lee and Steve Ditko. The episode follows Spider-Man as he faces the Rhino, who has an indestructible rhino-like suit and super strength. In his personal life, as his alter ego Peter Parker, Spider-Man tries to ask out Daily Bugle worker Betty Brant to the upcoming fall formal at his high school.

"The Invisible Hand" was written by Matt Wayne and directed by Dave Bullock. Wayne had written one other episode for The Spectacular Spider-Man before, and Bullock had directed the direct-to-video superhero film Justice League: The New Frontier. Clancy Brown voiced Rhino for the episode and was cast because the creators felt he could gracefully transition between the character's personalities. It originally aired on April 12, 2008, on the Kids WB! block for the CW Network and received generally positive reviews from television critics.

== Plot summary ==
Dr. Otto Octavius is preparing to attach a titanium resin exoskeleton onto Alex O'Hirn's body, modeled after that of a rhinoceros. Though Octavius is wary about going through with the experiment, Hammerhead forces him to activate it. O'Hirn's body is surgically attached to the suit and is given immeasurable strength. Meanwhile, Peter Parker is at the Daily Bugle trying to ask out Betty Brant to his school's fall formal, despite their four-year age difference; she finally agrees to consider it and Peter hurries homeward, exhilarated, until he realizes he will need money for the date. He tells his best friend Harry about his plans at school the next day. Peter then receives a text message that his Aunt May is having lunch with Betty at the Bugle. Flash Thompson then gives Peter a noogie just before Peter runs off.

O'Hirn dubs himself the "Rhino" and storms through the Bugle main office, where Aunt May and Betty are having lunch, and demands that J. Jonah Jameson tells him where Peter is, as he knows Peter photographs Spider-Man. Jameson spots Peter hiding after just arriving and lies to Rhino about not knowing where he is. Peter sneaks off and dons his Spider-Man costume, then engages Rhino in a fight. He wonders what the "Big Man" has been up to with all the supervillains, like Rhino, he has been organizing. Spider-Man has a large scale brawl through the city and soon realizes that Rhino needs to be constantly hydrated in order to fight. He lures him into a steam tunnel and breaks all the pipes, dehydrating Rhino into unconsciousness. As he passes out, Rhino accidentally mentions that "Big Man" is really a man named Mr. Lincoln.

Peter goes back to the Bugle and claims to have been hiding the whole time. Betty pulls him aside and tells him that she is simply too old to date him and is sorry; Peter, still downtrodden, remembers what the Rhino said and asks a reporter named Frederick Foswell if he knows about anyone by that name. Foswell tells him about L. Thompson Lincoln, a philanthropist who is rumored to be a dangerous crime lord for years. That night Peter goes to Lincoln's office as Spider-Man to find out if the rumors are true. Lincoln prefers to be called "Tombstone" and wields incredible strength; he pins him down and suggests that he work for him, fighting crime like usual but turning his head when it comes to his crimes. Spider-Man refuses to do so and runs off.

When Peter gets home, he is depressed. Aunt May insists that he gets dressed for the formal and explains that she has arranged for him to go with Mary Jane Watson. Peter thinks that she will turn out to be a plain girl due to the descriptions Aunt May has given him, but when she arrives he learns that she is an attractive girl and is flabbergasted.

== Production ==
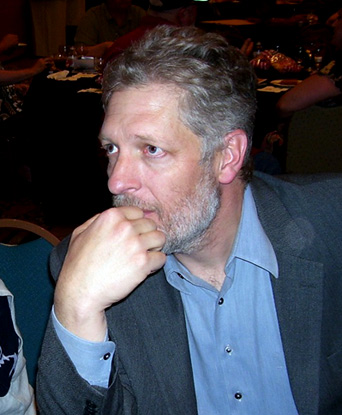
Clancy Brown portrayed Rhino. Brown based his voice on the character's simplistic thought process.

"The Invisible Hand" was written by Matt Wayne. Wayne had previously written the episode "Natural Selection" and went on to write "Persona". Dave Bullock, who directed the animated feature film Justice League: The New Frontier, directed the episode. The title of the episode follows the "Education of Peter Parker" scheme Greg Weisman, a developer and producer for The Spectacular Spider-Man, created. The naming scheme for the second story arc of season one refers to economics.

There was a scene cut from the episode after it was written, recorded, and storyboarded. The scene featured Rhino looking in a phone book for individuals named "Peter Parker" in the tri-state area. He storms into a "Peter James Parker" (Kevin Michael Richardson), a blind, elderly African-American bassoon player, accusing him of being the Peter Parker he is looking for. The man is outraged and asks him, "Do I look like I'm a photographer?" Rhino himself is furious as there are several Peter Parkers in the tri-state area. Weisman was upset that it was removed and called it "just hilarious".

Weisman and casting director Jamie Thomason each easily picked out Clancy Brown for the role of Rhino. Weisman explains, "We knew Rhino would require a voice with strength and menace, but Rhino also isn't the brightest bulb on the marquee, so we knew whoever we cast would also have to have the acting chops and comic timing to take the character beyond the usual dumb goon." They each had worked with Brown previously and knew he would be able to "nail it", as he is able to give a "tough, low voice" and "turn on a dime between dangerous and comedic characterizations."

Brown sought to reflect the Rhino's simplistic thinking style in his voice. He believes "the quintessential 'thug' was played by William Bendix in The Glass Key. The simpler the character, the simpler the thought process. That means Rhino's 'motivation' is never too complicated[...] he's very elemental. He's mad or happy or angry or sad or hungry or whatever. And it never gets beyond his appetites or ego." Brown considers that Bendix's performance perfectly portrayed this type of character.

== Release and reception ==
"The Invisible Hand" was originally broadcast on April 12, 2008, on the Kids WB! block for the CW Network. A two-week hiatus of The Spectacular Spider-Man followed the airing. It is available on the DVDs The Spectacular Spider-Man: Volume I, where it is paired with "Market Forces" and "Competition", and The Spectacular Spider-Man Animated Series: The Complete First Season.

The episode received generally positive reviews from television critics. Eric Goldman of IGN gave the episode an 8.0/10, ("Impressive") writing, "For an episode that began ho-hum, things certainly got interesting in the last half, with two surprise introductions." Goldman praised the fight sequences as well as the unveiling of Tombstone and Mary Jane. Goldman concluded his review by writing, "It's a testament to this show that it has it exactly right that Peter Parker's everyday, unmasked persona is so integral to the story, and that I actually am very curious how this dance goes."

Sean Elliot of iF Magazine gave the episode a "B+" and wrote that it was a "well-thought out premise". Elliot was "pleased" with the portrayal of Rhino as an unintelligent brute; he also enjoyed the change of the "Big Man's" identity from that of the comics - where he was a Bugle reporter named Frederic Foswell - and found it humorous to have Foswell be the reporter to tell Peter who the "Big Man" is rumored to be. Ultimate Disney reviewer Luke Bonanno did not include the episode among his top five episodes of The Spectacular Spider-Man's first season, but "feel[s] obligated to point out that the uniform excellence of the lot [makes] this a challenging task."
