= Competition (The Spectacular Spider-Man) =

- The Spectacular Spider-Man episode
- Spider-Man discovers Sandman's powers.
- Episode no.: Season 1 Episode 5
- Directed by: Troy Adomitis
- Written by: Kevin Hopps
- Production code: S1E05
- Original air date: March 29, 2008

Episode chronology
← Previous "Market Forces"	Next → "The Invisible Hand"

"Competition" is the fifth episode of the animated television series The Spectacular Spider-Man, which is based on the comic book character Spider-Man, created by Stan Lee and Steve Ditko. In it, Spider-Man must face the Sandman, a former petty thug who now can manipulate his sand body at will.

"Competition" was written by Kevin Hopps and directed by Troy Adomitis. Hopps and Adomotis each had their respective roles previously in "Interactions". Victor Cook, a developer, producer, and supervising director for The Spectacular Spider-Man, was thrilled to use Sandman because he felt he was "a perfect character for animation." "Competition" aired on March 29, 2008, on the Kids WB! block for The CW. The episode received warm reviews from television critics - IGN wrote that the fight scenes were the greatest of the series at the time.

== Plot summary ==
Peter, as Spider-Man, effectively defeats two common thugs - Flint Marko and Alex O'Hirn - and puts them in prison. While discussing their outrage towards Spider-Man, their bail is paid and they go into a limousine outside. Inside the limousine, Hammerhead tells them he has big plans for them, taking them to a secret base.

The next day, Peter practices his web slinging in his bedroom, when Aunt May walks in. He stops and she suggests he takes their neighbor Mary Jane Watson to the upcoming Fall Formal. Peter cringes at the idea and heads off to school. There, it is announced football practices will be held that day and Harry wants to try out. Peter passes on joining him as he feels it will reveal his abilities. When he hears Flash Thompson planning on specifically going after Harry during tryouts, he decides to keep him safe and try out anyway. They each do good at tryout - Harry impresses the coach and the other player, while Peter does the same using his extra abilities.

Meanwhile, Norman Osborn arrives at the warehouse to supervise an experiment on Marko. The restrained Marko will be given subdermal silicon transplants giving him a hardened untraceable silicon armor. Dr. Octavius says that the experiment has too many flaws but Osborn commands him to go with it anyway. The experiment malfunctions and the silicon violently mutates him. His body evaporates into sand and Octavius, terrified, thinks he has just killed him. Suddenly, Marko reshapes himself, still made of sand, and viciously thrashes against the walls for them to let him out. Hammerhead and Osborn take him outside in their limousine, where Marko is able to reform himself in his old appearance. When they tell him he will work for "the Big Man," but he decides to go alone and leaves. Hammerhead is fine with that as it means they will now have a distraction for Spider-Man.

Now codenamed "Sandman," Marko robs a bank and Spider-Man arrives immediately. He is overpowered by Marko's new powers and finds himself out of web fluid. After defeating Spider-Man, Sandman escapes through a sewer drain, after accidentally mentioning the "Big Man's" name. The next day, Peter wants to go find Sandman after school, but Liz Allan wishes him good luck on the football tryouts. Peter goes to tryouts again, doing well once more and being invited for the last day of tryouts along with Harry. Harry is upset that he outshined him and invites the other players to hang out at a soda shop. Meanwhile, Peter goes on the city bus and sits next to Gwen, whom he apologizes to for ignoring her lately and she accepts. She also hints that he should take her to the fall formal, but he does not get the clue and tells her he asked out Betty Brant, J. Jonah Jameson's secretary at the Daily Bugle.

After departing from the bus, Peter goes off as Spider-Man to an armored truck, which Sandman is robbing. In their struggle, the truck goes out of control and lands in a construction site. When Spider-Man tries to web him up, it proves to be ineffective as Sandman can slip through them; the villain then starts to attack Spider-Man with girders. Meanwhile, at the soda shop, Harry tries to impress the jocks, catching Kenny's girlfriend Glory's attention. Kenny plays a prank on Harry, which enrages Glory and she asks Harry to take her home. Back on the construction site, Spider-Man gets out from the pile of girders and gets the head on Sandman. He lures him up to the roof and encasing him in cement from the nearby cement maker.

That night, Harry comes home to tell his father that he has tried out for the football team, but he is unimpressed. Harry walks off, darkly remarking that he will "show them tomorrow." At final tryouts the next day, Harry makes the team along with Flash's friend Hobie Brown, and Peter purposely does terrible so he does not outshine his friend. Gwen then cheers him up with ice cream.

== Production ==
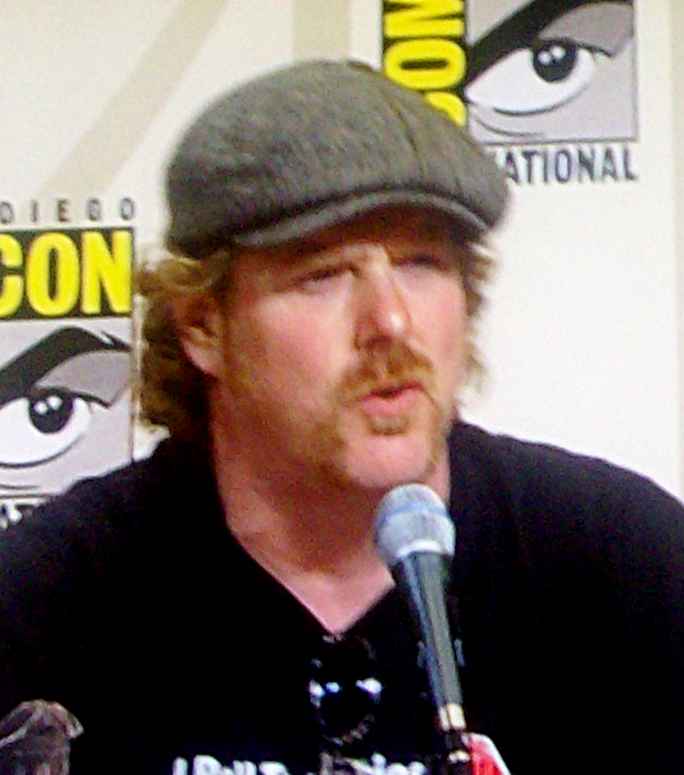
John DiMaggio voiced Sandman for the episode.

Hopps and Adomotis had written and directed the episode "Interactions," respectively, which featured the introduction of the villain Electro. The crew were very excited about working with Sandman. Victor Cook, supervising producer and story editor of the series, thinks that he was "designed for animation." Hopps "love[s] the ordinary-ness [sic] of the motivation for [him]" and finds that he is "just basically a crook who suddenly finds himself with super powers." John DiMaggio provided his voice for the character.

Thomas F. Wilson, known for playing the character Biff Tannen in the Back to the Future films, began his recurring role as policeman Stan Carter. In the comic books, Carter was a vicious serial killer by the name of Sin-Eater. Due to the show being for youth-oriented audiences, it was highly unlikely the series would make him the murdering alter-ego.

"Competitions" originally aired on March 29, 2008, on the Kids WB! block for The CW.

== Cultural references ==
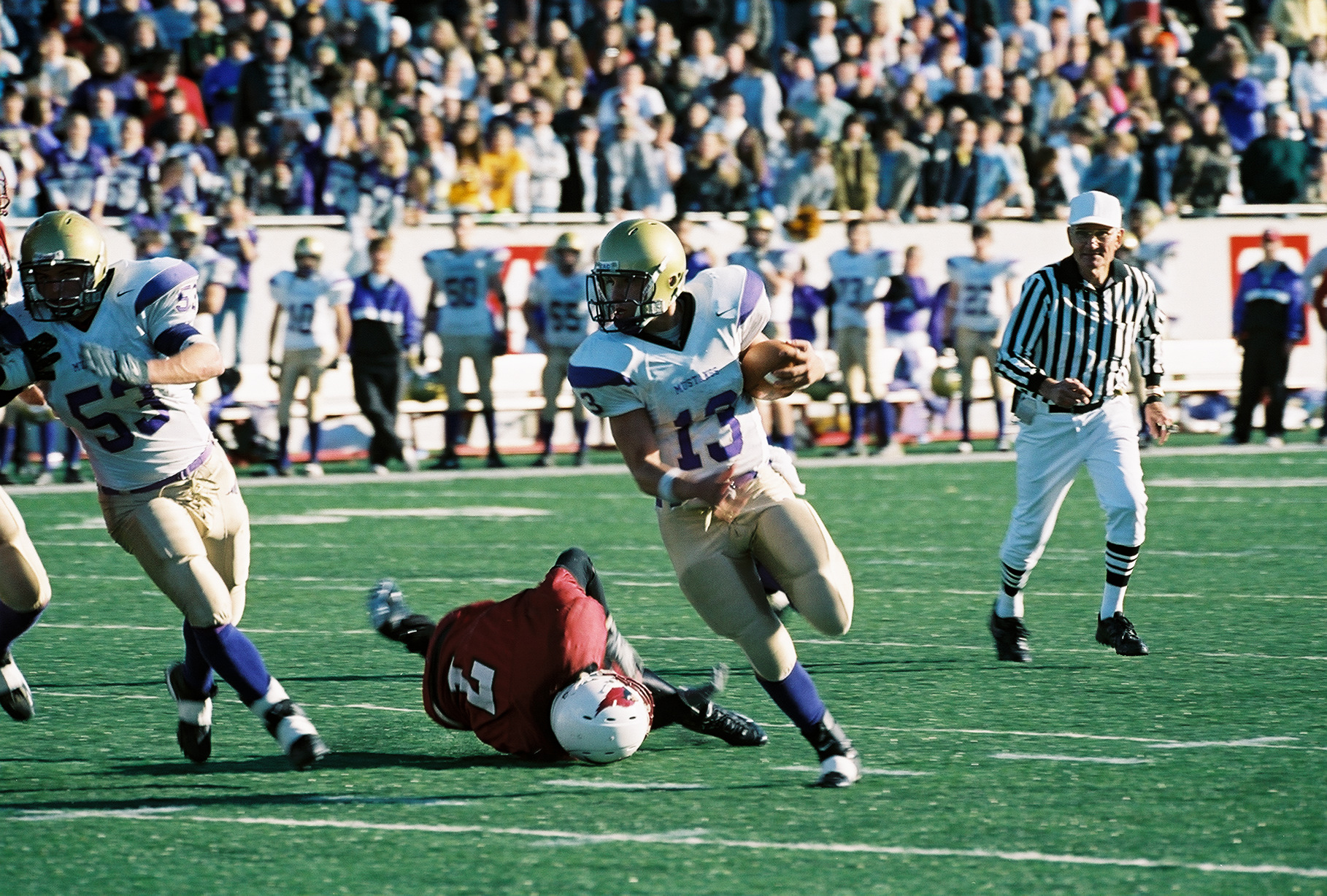
The majority of "Competition" focuses on high school football.

The title of the episode is referent to economics - the title scheme was used for the arc the episode fell inside and was pitched by Greg Weisman, story editor and producer for The Spectacular Spider-Man. It also refers to the episode's theme of people competing for glory. Several scenes from the episode were taken directly from the film Spider-Man 3. Spider-Man does a leg-sweep on Sandman in the same manner as in the film. Flint Marko's transformation into the Sandman was also based executed in the same manner as it was in the film's version of his transformation. A main focus in the episode features Peter and Harry trying out for high school football. The origin of this incarnation of Sandman shares similarities to his ultimate counterpart version while sharing similarities to the comics and the film.

== Reception ==
Hammerhead: "Stuff happens. End result's the same - you've got power no one else got...not even Spider-Man. Now you can get revenge for all those times the web-head put you behind bars."
Sandman: "Yeah...nah, wait; revenge is for chumps! I don't care about Spider-Man, all I ever wanted was the big score! And now I've got the power to get it."

— Both critics and the crew adored Sandman's simple motives, desiring money over revenge.

"Competition" was well received by television critics. Eric Goldman of IGN gave the episode an 8.6. ("Great") Goldman enjoyed Sandman's nonchalant behavior, favoring using his newfound powers for money over getting his revenge on Spider-Man. He wrote that the episode "delivered some of the best fight scenes yet," including the Spider-Man punching Sandman only to discover he is made of sand, which he called his favorite fight scene in the entire episode. On Peter's personal life being portrayed, Goldman wrote that he "had to deal with the age old superhero conflict regarding whether he could use his powers to help himself in everyday ways – not just whether it was 'right' but whether it might give him away."

== See also ==
- List of The Spectacular Spider-Man episodes
