= Survival of the Fittest (The Spectacular Spider-Man) =

- The Spectacular Spider-Man episode
- Spider-Man fights the Vulture. Vulture was designed namely after his original comic book appearance. Slight alterations were made in color and texture.
- Episode no.: Season 1 Episode 1
- Directed by: Victor Cook
- Written by: Greg Weisman
- Production code: S1E01
- Original air date: March 8, 2008

Episode chronology
← Previous —	Next → "Interactions"

"Survival of the Fittest" is the pilot episode of the animated television series The Spectacular Spider-Man, which is based on the comic book character Spider-Man, created by Stan Lee and Steve Ditko. The episode was written and directed by the series developers, Greg Weisman and Victor Cook. In the episode, Spider-Man (Josh Keaton) faces the evil Vulture (Robert Englund) as he begins his junior year in high school.

Sony Entertainment originally conceived The Spectacular Spider-Man as a series of four DVDs, and asked Weisman and Cook to develop it. The central idea was to follow Spider-Man in his younger years in the comics; Weisman and Cook wanted to incorporate the styles of the early comic publications by Lee and Ditko. Reviewers have cited other influences in the themes, such as the live action film series and the Ultimate Spider-Man continuity.

"Survival of the Fittest" originally aired on March 8, 2008, on the Kids' WB block on The CW. It had previously been shown to a large audience at the 2008 WonderCon. The episode was the highest rated program of the Kids WB! 2007-2008 combined with the second episode "Interactions" and alone received a Nielsen rating of 1.2/3. It was well received by critics, IGN calling it "a Spider-Man story that feels like classic Spider-Man, and that's a good thing."

== Plot ==
The night before school starts, Spider-Man, alter ego of Peter Parker (Josh Keaton), foils an attempted Jewel robbery in the background, a shadowed figure (Keith David) tells his henchman Hammerhead (John DiMaggio) to summon the Enforcers to kill Spider-Man. The next day, an aerodynamic engineer named Adrian Toomes (Robert Englund) is outraged at OsCorp for stealing his anti-gravity project, viciously berating Dr. Otto Octavius (Peter MacNicol) until Norman Osborn (Alan Rachins) arrives. Osborn dismisses Toomes, calling him a failure and a buzzard before he has him escorted out by security. Toomes turns to Octavius and declares that he no longer blames him for the theft of his work. Meanwhile, Peter arrives at school and tells his friends Gwen Stacy (Lacey Chabert) and Harry Osborn (James Arnold Taylor) that he is determined to get a date with Sally Avril, though both she and Flash Thompson (Joshua LeBar) humiliate him in front of everyone. After school, Peter and Gwen are offered an internship at Dr. Connor's lab, where the former was given his superpowers; both accept. Peter goes to Harry's apartment, where Norman congratulates him on his newfound career. Toomes, going by the name "the Vulture," breaks in wearing a suit with built-in metallic wings and talons, with his anti-gravity technology incorporated to it and kidnaps Norman. Peter slips out to don the Spider-Man costume and pursues Vulture. He succeeds in rescuing Norman but loses to Vulture in a fight.

Later, Peter goes to the lab where he meets up with Gwen, his close friend Eddie Brock (Benjamin Diskin), and the Conners. When he finds out he will not be paid for the internship, he tries to sell pictures to the Daily Bugle publisher J. Jonah Jameson (Daran Norris), though he is kicked out near immediately.

That night, Norman is attacked by the Vulture once more and when Spider-Man tries to stop him, he is fired upon by the Enforcers, who distract him while Vulture chases after Norman's limousine. While being pursued by the Enforcers, he follows after Vulture and ends up defeating him while getting the assassins off his back. When he returns home, his Aunt May (Deborah Strang) gives him a curfew to ensure he doesn't come home late again and gives him a slice of pie.

== Production ==
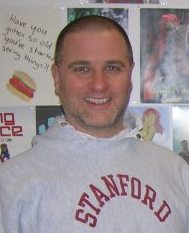
Greg Weisman (pictured in 2012)) wrote "Survival of the Fittest".

The Spectacular Spider-Man was originally conceived by Sony Entertainment as a series of four animated DVDs that chronicled the Spider-Man character in his youth. The company brought in Victor Cook and Greg Weisman to help with development. Weisman had had critical success with the series Gargoyles, while Cook worked on the Hellboy animated features. They both had been Spider-Man fans for decades, as well.

Weisman wanted to incorporate the early stages of the comic when Stan Lee and Steve Ditko where the character was in his younger stages; Cook agreed because he had yet to see it done before in any type of adaptation for the character. Other influences on the style were the Ultimate Spider-Man comics and the live action film adaptions of the comic publications. When the idea was changed to an animated television series, they still kept a similar chronicle style where "each episode stands alone as its own story, but like the comic book itself it's a saga. Then each three episodes is a story and those three episodes are what would be on the DVD releases."

The original title for the series was The Amazing Spider-Man, based on the Spider-Man comic publication of the same name. In mid-2007, the title was changed to The Spectacular Spider-Man, as well a Spider-Man comic series. Weisman prepared for his role as a story editor of the new series by going out and purchasing the first seven volumes of The Essential Spider-Man, which he had previously read as a child. he re-read them in order to "get the voice of those early stories" and took extensive notes.

The show was given a specific budget, so Weisman and Cook wanted to allow the animation to "move" more than anything, giving it simple and stylistic designs. Sam Raimi, director of the Spider-Man live action films, "set the bar" for the fluent movement styles Spider-Man has, which Weisman and Cook were in complete agreement of incorporating into the series. When designing the Vulture, the two employed the dark green shades from his original design, a color which they use thematically for most of their villains and other negative aspects of Peter's life, along with touches of blood-like red. His wings were employed in the same style that his comic book counterpart; "[They are] for steering[...]they don't keep him air born," Weisman describes. Vulture was voiced by Robert Englund, iconic for his portrayal as the horror film character Freddy Krueger.

"Survival of the Fittest" was written by Weisman and directed by Cook. The episode originally aired on March 8, 2008, on the Kids WB! block for The CW network. It had previously been shown to a packed audience at the 2008 WonderCon; several goers were forced to stand and the creators and other members of the crew took the stage to answer questions. When Disney XD premiered the series, it aired the episode, along with the following two, "Interactions" and "Natural Selection," on March 23, 2009.

== Cultural references ==
"Survival of the Fittest" follows a title scheme given by Weisman that follows "The Education of Peter Parker." For the episode and beginning arc of season one, the titles are based on Biology. The scene in the episode in which Spider-Man catches Norman Osborn in mid-air and makes several sarcastic comments to Vulture, such as "You guys play hot potato hardcore!" and "He may be right. I only rent [the skies]," were described by Comic Mix reviewer Alan Kistler as in the attitude of Bugs Bunny.

== Reception ==
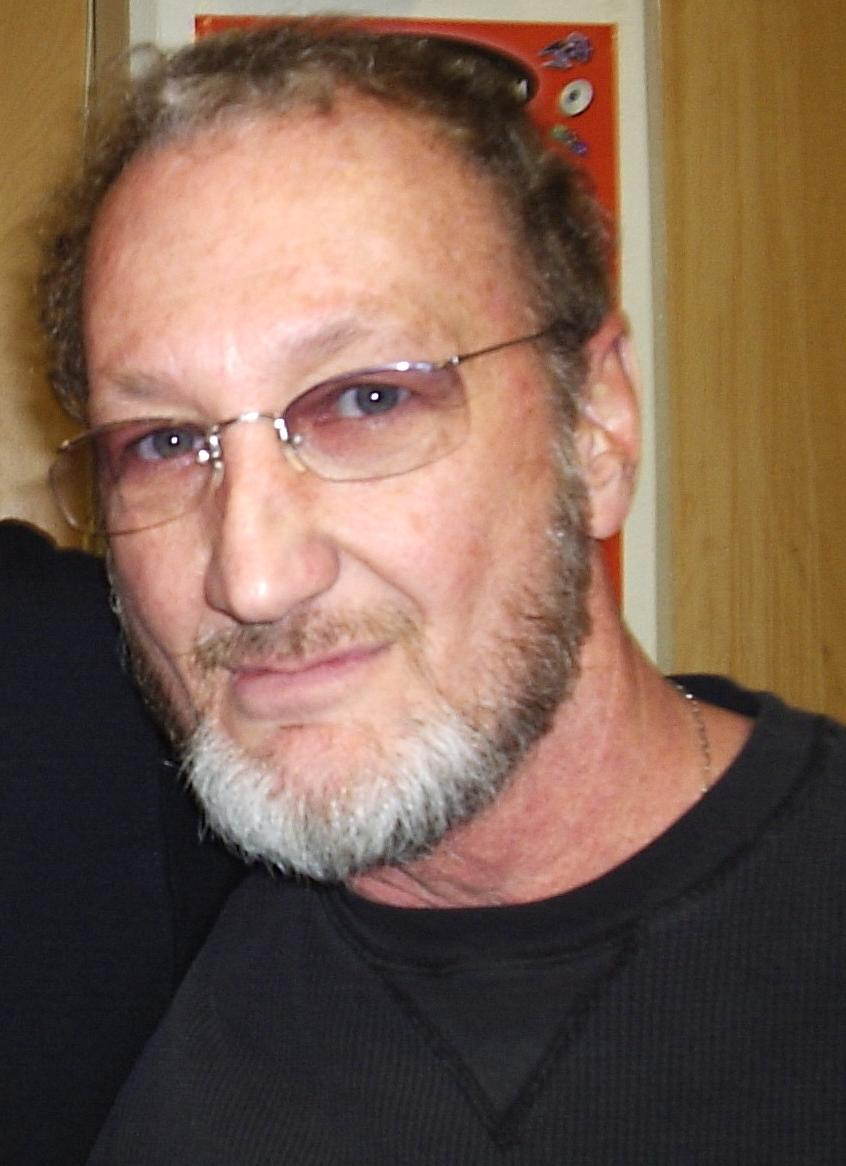
Robert Englund was praised for his performance in the episode.

In its original broadcast, "Survival of the Fittest" received a Nielsen rating of 1.2/3, which is considered high for American television. The rating was the top mark for the 10:00 a.m. timeslot for the 2007–2008 season and was a 20% increase of the previous week's. In key kids 2–11, it received a rating of 1.4/5, a 25% increase from the previous week's mark in the demographic.

Since airing, the episode has received positive reviews from critics. IGN reviewer Eric Goldman gave the episode an eight out of ten rating, commenting that it was "literally jam-packed with classic Spider-Man characters" and "a Spider-Man story that feels like classic Spider-Man." Goldman praised the 1960s-inspired style and described the humor as both "corny" and "legitimately," along with the fight sequences. Goldman enjoyed the fight sequences where Spider-Man faces the Vulture and Fancy Dan and gave "kodos" to the sound design teams for the "distinctive" noises made by Vulture's motors, along with the animation style.

Sean Elliot, senior edit of iF Magazine, gave "Survival of the Fittest" an "A"; Elliot wrote that it was "a Spider-man cartoon that's for all ages and ranges." Elliot said that he enjoyed the usage of several different Spider-Man villains to the point of watching the episode twice. Though the Vulture is not a favorite of Elliot's, he commented that the episode made him seem "pretty cool;" he went on to praise the voice cast, including Englund's performance as Vulture. Like Goldman, Elliot commented favorably on the animation style and nods to classic comic stories and said that it had a "bit for every level of Spider-man fan."
