= Reaction (The Spectacular Spider-Man) =

- The Spectacular Spider-Man episode
- Dr. Octopus pins Spider-Man to the wall. Episode director Jennifer Coyle opined that "Those arms are amazing, and the timing has been really good for this show, so much so that I think you feel the impact of those arms."
- Episode no.: Season 1 Episode 8
- Directed by: Jennifer Coyle
- Written by: Randy Jandt
- Production code: S1E08
- Original air date: May 3, 2008

Episode chronology
← Previous "Catalysts"	Next → "The Uncertainty Principle"

"Reaction" is the eighth episode of the American animated television series The Spectacular Spider-Man, which is based on the comic book character Spider-Man, created by Stan Lee and Steve Ditko. The episode originally broadcast in the United States on the Kids WB! block for The CW on May 3, 2008.

The episode details Dr. Otto Octavius as an accidental laboratory incident caused by the Green Goblin where the radiation merges special mechanical tentacles to his skin and seemingly damaged his brain (although it was later suggested that what was interpreted as brain damage was in fact his mind rewiring itself to accommodate four extra limbs), and turns him from a timid and weak scientist into the villain Dr. Octopus. "Reaction" was directed by Jennifer Coyle and was the first episode of the series to be written by Randy Jandt. While writing the teleplay, Jandt was challenged with staying true to the original material of Spider-Man, particularly towards that of Dr. Octopus.

"Reaction" received generally positive reviews, with television critics singling out Dr. Octopus' portrayal. Octopus's character design was applauded by both the designers and Coyle; the latter noted that his design allowed her to direct them freely in different manners, and that the arms in particular were particularly well-done. Peter MacNicol voiced the character and used a voice inspired by that of actor Laird Cregar. It is available on both the third volume DVD set for the series, as well as the complete season box set.

== Plot summary ==
Dr. Otto Octavius tries to complain to his boss Norman Osborn about the dangers of several recent experiments they have been performing to create supervillains in his laboratory and how Spider-Man could trace them to Oscorp, but is quickly berated by Osborn for his "whining." Octavius backs down and goes to work inside an experimentation chamber while Osborn departs. Unbeknown to him, the villain Green Goblin sneaks into the lab, activating the chamber's generators while locking Octavius inside. While unsuccessfully trying to escape from the chamber, the radiation emitted fuses the mechanical tentacles he is wearing into his skin.

Osborn and others arrive on the scene to turn off the generator, while Spider-Man jumps in to help get Octavius out of the wreckage. When the doctor wakes up, he attacks Osborn with his tentacles and pins him to a wall. When Spider-Man tries to intervene, Octavius brushes him aside as well with one of his tentacles, declaring himself "Dr. Octopus." He steals a power battery to recharge his tentacles and storms out of the building, using his tentacles as extra limbs. The next day, Peter, Gwen, Harry and some of Harry's new popular friends go to Coney Island, where Harry impresses everyone with his newfound strength. Liz Allan begins to attach herself to Peter and the two have a fun time. However, Peter spots Dr. Octopus and abandons the group to pursue him as Spider-Man.

Spider-Man follows Dr. Octopus to TriCorp, where he attempts to steal a power pack from a vault. Spider-Man swoops in and gets to the power source before him. He then runs out, with Dr. Octopus pursuing him, hoping to cause the doctor to run out of energy. They reach Coney Island through their ensuing brawl and Octopus, aware of Spider-Man's desire to save innocent lives, kidnaps Liz. With only an hour of energy left, he climbs to the top of a roller coaster, forcing Spider-Man to choose between the power pack and Liz. Spider-Man throws the pack in the air before rescuing Liz; he gets close to Dr. Octopus as the latter scrambles for the power pack and is able to take it away from him, successfully defeating the doctor.

When Peter returns to the group, he discovers that Liz is breaking up with her boyfriend Flash Thompson after he gets jealous that she spent the day so close to Peter. Sally blames Peter for it and runs to comfort Liz. Gwen approaches Peter, and the two agree they need to have a talk with Harry about his belligerent attitude towards them and constant strange behavior.

== Production ==
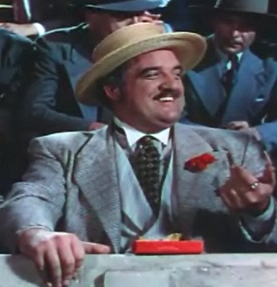
Peter MacNicol based his performance as Dr. Octopus on Laird Cregar (pictured).

"Reaction" was written by Randy Jandt and directed by Jennifer Coyle. It originally aired on the Kids WB! block for The CW on May 3, 2008, at 10:00 a.m. Eastern/Pacific Time, with a parental guidance rating of TV-Y7-FV. The episode's title, "Reaction," expands the series theme "The Education of Peter Parker" chosen by developer Greg Weisman. Episodes in the third season one arc all shared a naming scheme based on chemistry.

The episode was the first of the series to be penned by Jandt, who said that the opportunity to work on the series was "both thrilling and a bit daunting, primarily because of the elevated expectations of such a high-profile, established franchise." To meet these expectations, he followed a simplistic strategy—"be mindful of the history, listen to the direction and guidance of Greg Weisman, and then write an episode with a good, entertaining story that is packed with as much action and humor as 22 minutes will allow." Writing for Dr. Octopus in particular was difficult for the first-time writer as he had "such a range of character."

"Reaction" marked the first appearance of Dr. Otto Octavius as Dr. Octopus. Coyle noted her enthusiasm for the character, particularly towards his design; she has given noteworthy praise towards his arms, as they "are amazing, and the timing has been really good for this show, so much so that I think you feel the impact of those arms." Coyle also believes that people can connect with the character on different levels. Similarly, Sean Galloway—a character designer on the series—said that he is "probably one of [his] favorites" to have designed.

Peter MacNicol was cast to play Dr. Octopus. MacNicol had starred in primetime television series, including Chicago Hope, Numb3rs, and Boston Legal, while also being a veteran to the voice acting profession on animated series such as The Wild Thornberrys and Buzz Lightyear of Star Command. MacNicol chose to base Dr. Octopus' voice on that of Laird Cregar, a 1940s actor who, throughout his short-lived career, was challenged with obesity, until he lost too much weight and died at age 30. MacNicol, though, notes that he is "no mimic and it was Cregar's quality rather than his voice which gave me my model."

"Reaction" became available on the DVD The Spectacular Spider-Man, Volume 3, on March 17, 2009, alongside the episodes "Catalysts" and "The Uncertainty Principle." The volume featured episodes that detailed Green Goblin as a prominent or supporting character. "Reaction" also became available on the full season DVD box set entitled The Spectacular Spider-Man: The Complete First Season DVD, which featured every other episode of season one for the series.

== Reception ==
"Reaction" received a generally positive response from critics. Eric Goldman of IGN, giving the episode an 8.2. rating ("Impressive"), wrote favorably, noting that the depiction Dr. Octopus "was very clever – on one hand, he was a pitiful, cowering pushover. But when Norman was berating him we got a brief look at the anger within, as he imagined attacking Norman with his robotic tentacles." Goldman applauded both Dr. Octopus' line, "I've been good" and when Spider-Man crashes into several stuffed animals, only to be pulled out by Dr. Octopus in a manner similar to a Claw crane; he concluded that, "This show continues to leave several prime time live-action shows to shame when it comes to building serialized stories and has been one of the most pleasant surprises of the TV season."

Luke Bonanno of Ultimate Disney listed "Reaction" as one of his top five favorite episodes of the first season, while commenting that "the uniform excellence of the lot [makes] this a challenging task." Writing for DVD Talk, reviewer Justin Felix opined that the episode was "particularly action-packed." Rob M. Worley of Mania described Dr. Octopus' introduction as "explosive," while praising MacNicol for balancing such a heavy workload between both the episode and other series.
