= Natural Selection (The Spectacular Spider-Man) =

- The Spectacular Spider-Man episode
- Lizard and Spider-Man fight. Lizard's design and personality, as well as the fast paced fight sequences, were heavily praised by critics.
- Episode no.: Season 1 Episode 3
- Directed by: David Bullock
- Written by: Matt Wayne
- Production code: S1E03
- Original air date: March 15, 2008

Episode chronology
← Previous "Interactions"	Next → "Market Forces"

"Natural Selection" is the third episode of the animated television series The Spectacular Spider-Man, which is based on the comic book character Spider-Man, created by Stan Lee and Steve Ditko. In the episode, Spider-Man must face the scientist he was working for, Curt Connors, who has been mutated into an anthropomorphic lizard by a serum designed to regrow his missing arm.

"Natural Selection" was written by Matt Wayne, known for his work on Justice League Unlimited, and was the first time he had done so for The Spectacular Spider-Man. David Bullock directed it. "Natural Selection" originally aired on March 15, 2008, on the Kids WB! block for The CW network, and met overwhelmingly positive reviews from critics, who praise it for its action sequences, narrative direction, and the new design for Lizard.

== Plot summary ==
During his patrol, Spider-Man stops a group of thieves who are breaking into a bakery. Simultaneously, Spider-Man takes pictures to give to the Daily Bugle. He happily leaves and returns home before his curfew. However, upon reviewing the photos, he discovers they are unfortunately unusable. Meanwhile, Dr. Curt Connors injects himself with his experimental serum containing lizard DNA, which was electrocuted by Electro in the previous episode. Later that night, Curt awakens in pain to witness his arm regrow. His wife, Martha, is initially furious that he experimented on himself without her knowledge, but softens upon seeing their son's reaction.

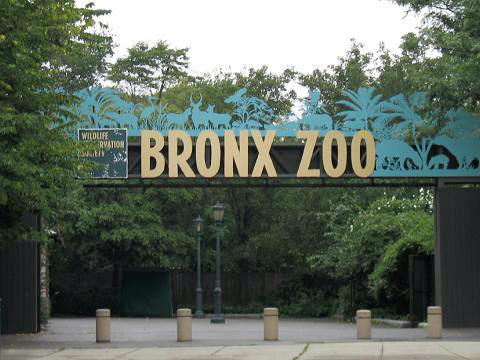
Spider-Man fights the Lizard at Bronx Zoo.

At school, Peter is attacked with water balloons by Flash Thompson and his sidekick Kenny Kong, which he dodges until he realizes it might reveal his secret identity as Spider-Man. Gwen steps in and gets everyone to laugh at Flash instead. Gwen and Peter go to the Connors lab and help Eddie clean up from the previous battle with Electro. Martha announces that Curt's arm had grown back and they celebrate until Martha realizes scales are growing on his arm. The group determine that the reptilian half of Curt's brain is taking over, and that he is starting to regress. Peter tries to comfort the Connors's son, Billy, but is interrupted when Curt fully transforms into a hulking, humanoid lizard, completely lacking in human thought, and runs off.

While Eddie goes in pursuit, Peter manages to slip out and goes after Connors as Spider-Man. While trying to communicate with him, they end up on a subway train fighting both inside, outside, and underneath it. Finally, Spider-Man falls off the train and Connors escapes. Spider-Man returns to the lab and is given a gene cleanser from Martha which must be administered to Connors orally. He then goes off to Bronx Zoo, where Connors is reportedly at.

Spider-Man enters the lizard room where Connors has taken refuge. Connors knocks him out and Eddie arrives to help him out. When he regains consciousness, Spider-Man comes up with a plan to trick him into the polar bear pond. They almost succeed when Connors is alerted by Spider-Man's cellphone ringing. Billy arrives to help his father, which fails to work, and Spider-Man leaps in to get Connors into the pond. Spider-Man pours the cleanser into the mouth of Connors who, as a result, returns to normal, his arm lost once more.

The next day, Peter gets his photos published in the Bugle and gets the money he needs. However, when Gwen, Eddie, and the Connors find out, they are outraged that he ran off simply to take pictures and say he has lost their trust. Although Martha understands the difficult choices that Peter had, she fires him. He secretly grabs another vial of gene cleanser and returns home, frustrated about his reputation. Blaming the events that gave him his powers, he is about to take the vial when he sees a photo of himself with Ben. Realizing that he had saved Curt either way, he decides that Spider-Man is needed and hides the vial under his desk.

== Production ==
"Natural Selection" was the first episode to be written by Matt Wayne. Wayne wrote two other episodes in the first season: "The Invisible Hand" and "Persona." David Bullock was the episode's director. Dee Bradley Baker, a voice actor for animated series and video games, continued his role as Dr. Connors/The Lizard.

The episode originally broadcast on March 15, 2008, on the Kids WB! programming block for The CW Network. When Disney XD premiered The Spectacular Spider-Man on March 23, 2009, it aired "Natural Selection" after the previous two episodes, "Survival of the Fittest" and "Interactions."

== Cultural references ==
Greg Weisman, one of The Spectacular Spider-Man's producers came up with a continuing title scheme that follows "The Education of Peter Parker." The first three episode titles ("Survival of the Fittest", "Interactions", and "Natural Selection") follow a biology theme. Peter's ringtone is "The Itsy Bitsy Spider." The episode incorporates several bullet time moments that are referent to the same style employed in The Matrix films.

== Reception ==
"Doing a great job of blending Peter's "regular" life with his Spider-Man, action-oriented experiences, this episode really shows how well this series is beginning to come together and offer a very entertaining take on the Spider-Man mythology."

— Eric Goldman,
IGN reviewer

Natural Selection received critical acclaim. Eric Goldman of IGN gave it an 8.8 out of 10 ("Great"). Goldman praised the Lizard's design, calling it "the most visually familiar villain the show had introduced yet" and called the fight sequences "great," especially that of the climactic fight between Spider-Man and Lizard. Goldman called Peter's loss of the Connors's and Eddie's trust "a very well done, classic Peter Parker-can't-win scenario" and that the episode did a "great job" blending the normal and Spider-Man parts of Peter's life.

Season Elliot, senior editor of iF Magazine, gave the episode an A−, writing "The Lizard himself was a nice update of the original Lizard and he was still in his torn pants, shirt, and lab coat." Elliot praised the design for differentiating itself from that used for Spider-Man or Spider-Man: The New Animated Series, and that he "can't wait for the action figure of this guy!" Like Goldman and Tanaka, Elliot enjoyed the action style and fight sequences and the callbacks to Lizard's original comic book appearance.

== See also ==
- List of The Spectacular Spider-Man episodes
