= Market forces (disambiguation) =

Market forces are basic factors in a market economy.

It may also refer to:

- Market Forces, a novel by Richard Morgan
- "Market Forces", an episode of The Spectacular Spider-Man
