= Joshua LeBar =

American actor

- Born: Joshua Matthew LeBar; September 27, 1977 (age 47); Cincinnati, Ohio
- Occupation: Actor

Joshua Matthew LeBar (born September 27, 1977) is an American actor whose television credits include Entourage, Castle, Pushing Daisies, CSI: NY, The Man, Boston Public, 7th Heaven, and Tell Me You Love Me.

== Early life ==
LeBar was born in Cincinnati, Ohio, where he attended LaSalle High School. He played football in the fall and performed in the school musicals in the spring. LeBar portrayed "Nathan Detroit" in Guys and Dolls while at LaSalle. LeBar went to Butler University in Indianapolis Indiana to play football. He graduated from Butler University with a B.A in Theater Performance and a B.A in Telecommunications. LeBar performed in King Lear, On The Verge, Fool For Love, and Hair while attending Butler. He also spent his junior year at Butler studying in London, England. Later, wrote and directed his senior thesis called "Tasting Reality" while at Butler. After graduating, Josh LeBar performed at the Indiana Repertory Theater in a production of Othello.

== Career ==
LeBar is best known for his work on HBO's Entourage as Ari Gold's nemesis "Josh Weinstein". He was seen as a recurring character on Entourage for five consecutive seasons. Entertainment Weekly nominated him for "Best Guest Actor in a Comedy Series." He was also in the indie film Float and the Lionsgate film The Take. LeBar has appeared as a guest star many times in his career. He has worked on Castle, CSI NY, Pushing Daisies, Tell Me You Love Me, Boston Public, and Seventh Heaven. From 2008 to 2009, LeBar played Flash Thompson on the animated The Spectacular Spider-Man. The show also starred Josh Keaton (Spider-Man) and Lacey Chabert (Gwen Stacy).

In 2009 LeBar formed the production company Dime Films with actress Leighton Meester.

LeBar also manages the Los Angeles-based band Check in the Dark. The band worked with producer Tal Herzberg on an earlier project The band LeBar manages, Check in the Dark, released their second album in November 2012 called The Game.
