= Victor Cook =

American television director, writer, and producer

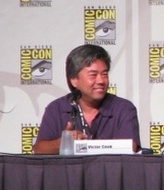
- Victor Cook at the 2007 Comic Con
- Born: c. 1961 (age 64–65); Saitama, Japan
- Education: CSULB
- Occupations: Television director; writer; producer
- Years active: 1987–present
- Known for: The Spectacular Spider-Man; Scooby-Doo! Mystery Incorporated; Stretch Armstrong and the Flex Fighters
- Children: 2

Victor A. Cook (born c. 1960/1961) is an American film and television producer and director best known for his work on the animated series The Spectacular Spider-Man (2008–2009), Scooby-Doo! Mystery Incorporated (2010–2013) and Stretch Armstrong and the Flex Fighters (2017–2018), and as an executive producer of Disney Junior's T.O.T.S.

== Early life ==
Cook was born in the early 1960s, one of five children on the Johnson Air Force Base in Saitama, Japan. His parents met in an Air Force cafeteria while his father was enlisted. He is half-Korean through his mother. After leaving Saitama, the family lived in San Antonio, Texas; Florida; Fort Worth, Texas; Euless, Texas; Okinawa, Japan (at Kadena Air Base); and Atwater, California. After high school, he briefly attended a junior college in Central California before transferring to California State University, Long Beach.

As a child and into college, Cook desired to be a print cartoonist, but was dissuaded after reading about Jack Kirby's career. While at the junior college, a life drawing teacher gave him the contact information for a former student who went on to work for Hanna-Barbera. He only called once he was already into his career. The student suggested taking an animation class at The Animation Guild.

== Career ==
After graduating college, Cook worked as a graphic artist and political cartoonist for Costa Mesa's Daily Pilot then as an assistant animator at Filmation. At Filmation, he found himself drawn to storyboards because they reminded him of comic cels. He worked on BraveStarr during the day and took storyboard classes at night until Filmation folded. He was able to find a job working on ALF Tales and ALF: The Animated Series. This experience helped him eventually land at Disney Television Animation, where he worked for 16 years. After leaving Disney, he worked with Greg Weisman to create The Spectacular Spider-Man; worked on Scooby-Doo! Mystery Incorporated; and started at Hasbro, where he helped develop Stretch Armstrong and the Flex Fighters alongside writer Kevin Burke and producer Chris Wyatt. In the late 2010s, he was hired onto T.O.T.S. by Disney Junior.

He is the creator of the Mecha-Nation comic books. It is the first comic book he's worked on.

== The Spectacular Spider-Man ==
I wanted to make sure that this was an iconic Spider-man for the different generations of fans, but I also wanted to bring in a new generation of fans that had a passing interest in it. I also really wanted this to be a two dimensional Spider-man that moved like we've never really seen him move in animation before. I thought Sam Raimi set the bar of how he should move and I haven't seen that in animation.

— Cook on the animation style he chose for The Spectacular Spider-Man

Cook was called by Sony Entertainment to develop a DVD project about Spider-Man. Cook developed it with Greg Weisman; they wanted to base it on the early comic book publications of the character that showed him younger, which Cook had never seen done before in any adaption. The idea was reformatted to an animated television series, but maintained a similar chronicle style with story arcs whose episodes could still work as standalone stories. The original title for the series was The Amazing Spider-Man, based on the comic series of the same name, but by mid-2007 the name was changed to The Spectacular Spider-Man.

Cook wanted the animation to be squash and stretch style, and the action to be as good as the first two Spider-Man films. Sam Raimi directed as they had "set the bar" for the fluid movement for Spider-Man. As they were on a specific budget, they wanted to allow the animation to "move" more than anything, giving it simple and stylistic designs. He also looked back on Blood and Iron which had a "fresh, young, look to it" that appealed to him visually. Cook wanted to make an "iconic" Spider-Man for both new and older generations and "really wanted this to be a two dimensional Spider-man that moved like we've never really seen him move in animation before."

== Personal life ==
He and his wife Sonia, who is also half-Korean, have been married since the late 1980s. They have two children: Hanah and Jackson. His daughter is an animation writer. and, according to Victor's friend and colleague Greg Weisman, served as the inspiration for Artemis Crock in Young Justice.

As an animator, Cook admires Charles M. Schulz, Jack Kirby and Hayao Miyazaki, and was a Hanna-Barbera fan growing up.

== Filmography ==
=== Television ===
Year	Title	Credited as				Notes	Ref(s)
Year	Title	Director	Producer	Art	Writer	Notes	Ref(s)
1987–1988	BraveStarr	No	No	Yes	No		
1988	ALF Tales	No	No	Yes	No		
1988–1989	ALF: The Animated Series	No	No	Yes	No		
1989	The Smurfs	No	No	Yes	No		
1989	The Karate Kid	No	No	Yes	No		
1989	Garfield and Friends	No	No	Yes	No		
1989	Denver, the Last Dinosaur	No	No	Yes	No		
1990	TaleSpin	No	No	Yes	No	Episode: "Time Waits for No Bear"	
1991	Widget	No	No	Yes	No		
1991–1992	Darkwing Duck	No	No	Yes	Yes	Wrote "Kung Fooled"	
1991–1992	Mr. Bogus	No	No	Yes	No		
1992	The Little Mermaid	No	No	Yes	No	Episode: "Urchin"	
1992	Raw Toonage	No	No	Yes	No	Episodes: "Bonkers in Space/Cro-Magnum PI/The Treasure of the Sierra Marsdre" and "Sheerluck Bonkers/All Potato Network/The Puck Stops Here"	
1993	Bonkers	No	No	Yes	No		
1994	Aladdin	No	No	Yes	No		
1995	Rocko's Modern Life	No	No	Yes	No		
1995–1996	Gargoyles	No	No	Yes	No		
1996	Quack Pack	No	No	Yes	No		
1996	Jungle Cubs	No	No	Yes	No		
1997–1998	101 Dalmatians: The Series	Yes	Yes	No	No		
2000	Buzz Lightyear of Star Command	Yes	No	No	No		
2001–2002	The Legend of Tarzan	Yes	No	No	No		
2002–2004	Fillmore!	No	No	Yes	No		
2003–2006	Lilo & Stitch: The Series	Yes	Yes	No	No		
2005	American Dragon: Jake Long	No	No	Yes	No		
2006–2008	Mickey Mouse Clubhouse	Yes	No	Yes	No		
2008	The Spectacular Spider-Man: Attack of the Lizard	Yes	Yes	No	No		
2008–2009	The Spectacular Spider-Man	Yes	Yes	No	Yes		
2010–2013	Scooby-Doo! Mystery Incorporated	Yes	Yes	No	No		
2012	Young Justice	Yes	No	No	No	Episode: "Coldhearted"	
2017–2018	Stretch Armstrong and the Flex Fighters	Yes	Executive	Yes	Yes	Co-creator; Also wrote the main title lyrics	
2019–2022	T.O.T.S.	No	Executive	No	No		
2023–present	Pupstruction	No	Executive	No	No		

=== Film ===
Year	Title	Credited as				Notes	Ref(s)
Year	Title	Director	Producer	Art	Writer	Notes	Ref(s)
1993	The Return of Jafar	No	No	Yes	No	Direct-to-video	
1996	Aladdin and the King of Thieves	No	No	Yes	No	Direct-to-video	
2001	Lady and the Tramp II: Scamp's Adventure	No	No	Yes	No	Direct-to-video	
2002	101 Dalmatians II: Patch's London Adventure	No	No	Yes	No	Direct-to-video	
2002	Tarzan & Jane	Yes	No	No	No	Segments "Volcanic Diamond Mine" and "Flying Ace"	
2003	Atlantis: Milo's Return	Yes	No	No	No		
2003	21 Grams	No	No	Yes	No		
2007	Hellboy: Blood and Iron	Yes	No	No	No	TV movie	
2007	Hellboy: Iron Shoes	Yes	No	No	No	Bonus short for Hellboy: Blood and Iron	
2007	My Blueberry Nights	No	No	Yes	No		
2010	Dante's Inferno: An Animated Epic	Yes	No	No	No	Direct-to-DVD	
2012	Ben 10: Destroy All Aliens	Yes	Yes	No	No	TV movie	
2012	Scooby-Doo! Haunted Holidays	Yes	Yes	No	No	Direct-to-DVD	
2012	Scooby-Doo! Spooky Games	No	Yes	No	No	Direct-to-DVD	
2013	Scooby-Doo! Stage Fright	Yes	Yes	No	No	Direct-to-DVD	
2013	Scooby-Doo! and the Spooky Scarecrow	No	Yes	No	No	Direct-to-DVD	
2013	Scooby-Doo! Mecha Mutt Menace	No	Yes	No	No	Direct-to-DVD	
2013	Stoker	No	No	Yes	No		
2013	Robosapien: Rebooted	No	No	Yes	No		
2014	Scooby-Doo! Ghastly Goals	Yes	No	No	No	Direct-to-DVD	
2015	Scooby-Doo! and the Beach Beastie	Yes	No	No	No	Direct-to-DVD	
2019	Mickey's Treat	Yes	No	No	No	TV movie	
