= The Spectacular Spider-Man (TV series) =

American animated television series

- Also known as: The Spectacular Spider-Man: Animated Series
- Genre: Superhero; Action-adventure; Drama
- Based on: Spider-Man by: Stan Lee and Steve Ditko
- Developed by: Victor Cook; Greg Weisman
- Voices of: Josh Keaton; Lacey Chabert; James Arnold Taylor; Daran Norris; Vanessa Marshall; Joshua LeBar; Alanna Ubach; Clancy Brown; Alan Rachins
- Theme music composer: The Tender Box
- Opening theme: "The Spectacular Spider-Man Theme"
- Ending theme: "The Spectacular Spider-Man Theme" (instrumental)
- Composers: Kristopher Carter; Michael McCuistion; Lolita Ritmanis
- Country of origin: United States
- Original language: English
- No. of seasons: 2
- No. of episodes: 26 (list of episodes)

Production
- Executive producers: Stan Lee; Craig Kyle; Eric S. Rollman
- Producers: Victor Cook (S1); Diane A. Crea
- Editors: Ralph A. Eusebio; Bruce King
- Running time: 22–23 minutes
- Production companies: Adelaide Productions; Marvel Entertainment; Culver Entertainment; Sony Pictures Television

Original release
- Network: The CW
- Release: March 8 – June 14, 2008
- Network: Disney XD
- Release: June 22 – November 18, 2009

Related
- Spider-Man: The New Animated Series; Ultimate Spider-Man; Spider-Man: Across the Spider-Verse

The Spectacular Spider-Man (Note: Titled onscreen as The Spectacular Spider-Man: Animated Series) is an American animated superhero television series developed by Victor Cook and Greg Weisman, based on the Marvel Comics character Spider-Man. In terms of overall tone and style, the series is based primarily on the Stan Lee, Steve Ditko and John Romita Sr. era of The Amazing Spider-Man comics, with a similar balance of action, drama, and comedy, as well as a high school setting. However, it also blends material from all eras of the comic's run up to that point in addition to other sources, such as Brian Michael Bendis' Ultimate Spider-Man comics (2000–2011) and Sam Raimi's Spider-Man film trilogy (2002–2007).

Produced by Marvel Entertainment, Culver Entertainment, Adelaide Productions and Sony Pictures Television, the series aired its first season on The CW starting on March 8, 2008 and ended on June 14 later that year. Its second season premiered on Disney XD in the United States on June 2, 2009 and ended its run on November 18 of that year. The entire series was broadcast in Canada on Teletoon. Although 5 seasons were originally planned (consisting of 65 episodes and direct-to-DVD films), only two seasons aired. The show was cancelled after The Walt Disney Company acquired Marvel Entertainment, giving Disney the rights to Spider-Man shows, while Sony Pictures maintained the movie rights.

Despite its short run, The Spectacular Spider-Man has received widespread acclaim since its initial airing, and is considered to be one of the character's finest adaptations, with praise being given for its mature writing, unique art style, modernized faithfulness to the original comics, and the voice performances of the characters, particularly Josh Keaton's voice performance as the titular character. The series' iteration of Spider-Man made an appearance in the 2023 feature film Spider-Man: Across the Spider-Verse, with Keaton reprising his role.

== Synopsis ==
The series follows Peter Parker, a student at Midtown Manhattan Magnet High School who struggles to balance his responsibilities as the costumed hero Spider-Man with the problems of his personal life. Each season takes place over a semester, with season one running from September to November and season two from December to March.

Producer Greg Weisman has stated that the series' theme is "The Education of Peter Parker", and each of the show's arcs is named after a course of study: season one's arcs are Biology 101, Economics 101, Chemistry 101, and Psychology 101; while season two's arcs are Engineering 101, Human Development 101, Criminology 101, and Drama 101.

=== Season 1 ===
The first season opens with Peter entering his junior year, having only been bitten by a genetically-enhanced spider and acquired his powers in recent months. In addition to fighting crime, Peter must navigate his romantic affections for Gwen Stacy and Mary Jane Watson, maintain his friendships with Harry Osborn and Eddie Brock, deal with being bullied by football star Flash Thompson, keep his internship position as a lab assistant to Curt Connors at Empire State University, and help to support his Aunt May by working as a freelance photographer for the Daily Bugle. The Bugle is owned by J. Jonah Jameson, who leads a smear campaign against Spider-Man.

Spider-Man's fight against crime attracts the attention of Tombstone, the "Big Man" in New York City. With the help of Norman Osborn, Otto Octavius, and Hammerhead, Tombstone orchestrates the creation of various criminals to distract Spider-Man from interfering with his empire. Among the supervillains that Spider-Man is forced to contend with are the Vulture, Electro, Lizard, Shocker, Sandman, Rhino, Doctor Octopus, Chameleon, and Black Cat. Tombstone's plans are complicated when the Green Goblin surfaces and attempts to take control of the criminal underworld. After the Goblin is seemingly vanquished, Spider-Man overcomes an alien symbiote who possessed his body, which ultimately leads to Eddie Brock's transformation into Venom.

=== Season 2 ===
The second season sees Peter's life become significantly more complicated as he finds himself torn between Gwen and Liz Allan, who have both confessed their feelings for him. Harry returns to school after a leave of absence, while his father, Norman, becomes Peter's mentor and aids him in reacquiring his position as Curt Connors' lab assistant.

Meanwhile, Spider-Man faces new villains such as Mysterio, Kraven the Hunter, Tinkerer, Silver Sable, and Molten Man. Several of his old enemies also return, including Venom, who attempts to expose Spider-Man's secret identity and remove his powers. An all-out gang war later erupts between Tombstone's established order, the Master Planner's supervillain forces, and the old guard of the Silvermane crime family. Once all of these major threats have been dealt with, Spider-Man has a final confrontation with the Green Goblin, who masterminded the gang war to eliminate his opposition, take control of New York City, and destroy Spider-Man.

The series concludes with loose ends due to the show's cancellation before a third season was produced. Other new characters introduced, who were intended to have more prominent roles in future seasons, include Miles Warren, Calypso, Cletus Kasady, Morris Bench, and Roderick Kingsley.

== Episodes ==
Season	Episodes	Originally released		
Season	Episodes	First released	Last released	Network
1	13	March 8, 2008	June 14, 2008	The CW
2	13	June 22, 2009	November 18, 2009	Disney XD

== Cast and characters ==
The vast timeline of the Spider-Man comics has been condensed and reconfigured to include classic and important characters within the same timeframe. Gwen Stacy, Harry Osborn and Mary Jane Watson are depicted not as direct equivalents to their counterparts, but rather as characters who will eventually evolve into their established roles from the comics. The series incorporates numerous villains from different eras of the Spider-Man mythology, almost all of whom are introduced as regular characters before they become supervillains in later episodes.

=== Main cast ===
- Josh Keaton – Peter Parker / Spider-Man
- Lacey Chabert – Gwen Stacy
- James Arnold Taylor – Harry Osborn, Fredrick Foswell / Patch
- Daran Norris – J. Jonah Jameson, John Jameson
- Vanessa Marshall – Mary Jane Watson
- Joshua LeBar – Flash Thompson
- Alanna Ubach – Liz Allan
- Clancy Brown – George Stacy, Alex O'Hirn / Rhino, Ox (pilot)
- Alan Rachins – Norman Osborn

=== Additional voices ===
- Thom Adcox-Hernandez – Phineas Mason / Tinkerer
- Ed Asner – Ben Parker
- Dee Bradley Baker – Curt Connors / Lizard
- Irene Bedard – Jean DeWolff
- Jeff Bennett – Montana / Shocker, St. John Devereaux, Bernard Houseman
- Xander Berkeley – Quentin Beck / Mysterio
- Steve Blum – Green Goblin, Chameleon, Blackie Gaxton, Dillbert Trilby, Seymour O'Reilly
- Angela Bryant – Calypso
- Max Burkholder – Billy Connors
- Robert Costanzo – Sullivan Edwards
- Nikki Cox – Sable Manfredi / Silver Sable
- Jim Cummings – Cat Burglar (season one), Crusher Hogan
- Keith David – Big Man (pilot)
- Grey DeLisle – Betty Brant, Sally Avril
- John DiMaggio – Flint Marko / Sandman, Hammerhead
- Benjamin Diskin – Eddie Brock / Venom
- Charles Duckworth – Hobie Brown
- Robert Englund – Adrian Toomes / Vulture
- Bill Fagerbakke – Morris Bench
- Miguel Ferrer – Silvio Manfredi / Silvermane
- Crispin Freeman – Max Dillon / Electro
- Elisa Gabrielli – Ashley Kafka
- Brian George – Aaron Warren, Miles Warren
- Dorian Harewood – Dr. Bromwell
- Tricia Helfer – Felicia Hardy / Black Cat
- Kelly Hu – Sha Shan Nguyen
- Andrew Kishino – Kenny Kong, Ned Lee
- Clyde Kusatsu – Ted Twaki
- Phil LaMarr – Robbie Robertson, Rand Robertson, Fancy Dan / Ricochet
- Stan Lee – Stan
- Eric Lopez – Mark Allan / Molten Man
- Jane Lynch – Joan Jameson
- Peter MacNicol – Otto Octavius / Doctor Octopus / Master Planner
- James Remar – Walter Hardy / Cat Burglar (season two)
- Kevin Michael Richardson – Tombstone, Principal Davis, Coach Smith
- Kath Soucie – Martha Connors, Anna Watson
- Deborah Strang – May Parker
- Cree Summer – Glory Grant
- Danny Trejo – Ox
- Courtney B. Vance – Roderick Kingsley
- Eric Vesbit – Sergei Kravinoff / Kraven the Hunter
- B. J. Ward – Mayor Waters
- Greg Weisman – Donald Menken
- Thomas F. Wilson – Stan Carter

== Crew ==
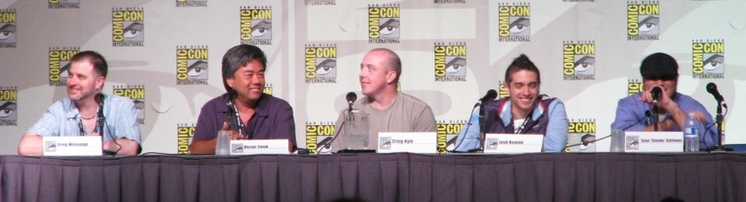
Members of the crew at San Diego Comic-Con 2007. Greg Weisman far left with Victor Cook to his right. Photo: Comiquero.com

- Greg Weisman – Supervising producer, story editor, writer
- Victor Cook – Supervising producer, supervising director
- Diane A. Crea – Producer
- Eric Vesbit – Associate producer
- Wade Wisninski – Associate producer
- Dave Bullock – Director
- Kevin Altieri – Director
- John Diaz – Production manager
- Kevin Hopps – Writer
- Matt Wayne – Writer
- Andrew Robinson – Writer
- Randy Jandt – Script coordinator, writer
- Jennifer Coyle – Director
- Sean Galloway – Character designer
- Mike Inman – Background painter, visual developer
- Jamie Thomason – Casting director
- Meagan Healy – Production supervisor
- Brian G. Smith – Production supervisor
- Ben Maloney – Production assistant
- Sherrian Felix – Production coordinator
- Jennifer L. Anderson – Post-production assistant
- Sean Herbert – Animation clerk

== Production ==
A new Spider-Man animated series was announced in August 2006 along with Sony Pictures Television's new direct-to-DVD division, Culver Entertainment, that would produce it with 13 episodes. The series was planned for a 2007 release on DVD while international distributing to TV channels including Sony's. The DVD format was to be four discs with three episodes each. Greg Weisman and Victor Cook were both hired on to develop the show.

The Spectacular Spider-Man was announced by Kids' WB Senior Vice President and General Manager Betsy McGowen on June 18, 2007, as being picked up and slated for an early 2008 premiere by the Kids' WB! on The CW. Weisman and Cook were assigned to the series at the time as supervising producer and producer/supervising director, respectively. The art style of the series is more simplified than in previous incarnations but retain their iconic elements. This choice was made to ensure that Spider-Man would move as he should and replicate the fluidity from Sam Raimi's movie incarnation.

The series was produced by its television animation studio, Adelaide Productions (due to Sony's complete control over the Spider-Man entertainment license at the time) with Hanho Heung-Up Co., Ltd., Dong Woo Animation and MOI Animation, Inc. contributed some of the animation for this series. The title sequence for the show was directed by Victor Cook with the theme song written and performed by The Tender Box.

Weisman has explained that in adapting the comics for the show, the producers "tried to follow what [they] came to call "The Five Cs": Contemporary, Cohesive, Coherent, Classic and iConic." "The advantage of hindsight" allowed the show to be "more coherent and cohesive than the original" comic continuity, which contains "considerable duplication, a false start here and there, [and] conflicting interpretations." Weisman studied all of the characters to find their "core essence," and the show often combined characters and storylines when necessary for the sake of coherence. For example, Flash Thompson was found to be "a bully, who deep down is actually an honorable guy," while Shocker was found to be an "iconic costume" with no character, so he was combined with Montana.

The Spectacular Spider-Man debuted on March 8, 2008, with back-to-back episodes, "Survival of the Fittest" and "Interactions", under the banner "Spectacular Saturday". The series debuted under a cloud as The CW had just indicated that the network would end its kid's block for a brokered outsourced block. While Culver had already started producing the second season.

== Cancellation ==
Greg Weisman was hoping for the series to reach 5 seasons, consisting of 65 episodes in total. However, only 2 seasons and 26 episodes of The Spectacular Spider-Man were produced.

The series stopped production with a renewal dependent upon the ratings for season 2 on the U.S. Disney XD channel and the sales of the DVDs. On September 1, 2009, it was announced that the television rights for Spider-Man were returned to Marvel by Sony. At the time, President of Marvel Animation, Eric Rollman, further stated that "no decisions have been made either way" regarding the fate of the series. On April 13, 2010, Newsarama reported that the series' cancellation occurred just after The Walt Disney Company acquired Marvel Entertainment in December 2009.

On that same day, Marvel announced that a new series loosely based on the Ultimate Spider-Man comic book storyline would air on Disney XD in the fall of 2011, which actually aired on April 1, 2012. Weisman told IGN: "I've heard nothing directly from Marvel, but I think the Ultimate Spider-Man announcement makes it fairly clear that The Spectacular Spider-Man is over." Marvel Animation and Sony also commented on this to Marvel Animation Age, confirming that the series had ceased production.

Weisman would later write that in summer 2009, in exchange for concessions on the movie rights, Sony had relinquished to Marvel its license to produce television works that used Spider-Man and associated characters, but had retained ownership of The Spectacular Spider-Man series and all of the production elements created specifically for it, such as character designs and storylines. Weisman claimed that Sony's decision to return the license to Marvel had occurred before that year's San Diego Comic-Con, and that he and supervising director Victor Cook were only made aware of this development just as The Walt Disney Company announced their intentions to buy Marvel Entertainment in its entirety, thus resulting in Disney receiving the license to produce Spider-Man content for television. Therefore, neither Sony nor Marvel could continue production of the series, as each lacked some of the essential rights to do so. Disney would eventually finalize their acquisition of Marvel and all related assets in December 2009, just after the second season concluded airing on Disney XD, Marvel's new sister network.

Due to the show's cancellation, many storylines were abandoned. In season 3, Curt would have moved to Florida and begun working on a cure for Electro, and a planned DVD Spring Break movie would have also been set in Florida between seasons 2 and 3, with movies between seasons 3 and 4, and between seasons 4 and 5 to follow. Scorpion, Hydro-Man, and Hobgoblin were confirmed to be major villains for season 3, in addition to Carnage, Mister Negative, and Morbius, the Living Vampire. Emily Osborn was also planned to appear as a major supporting character in the third season after making non-speaking cameo appearances throughout season 2, with Marina Sirtis intended to be cast in the role, after previously collaborating with Greg Weisman on the series Gargoyles (1994–97). Weisman also indicated that the creative team had long-term plans for the introduction of Miles Warren, a character who eventually becomes the Jackal in the comics, as well as Stan Carter and Jean DeWolff, both pivotal to the origin of the former becoming the vigilante Sin-Eater.

There were also plans to eventually seed more elements of the Spider-Man comics in the show beyond season 2, including introducing the Spider-Mobile and Spider-tracers. There would have also been an episode exploring how Peter developed his web-shooters. Season 3 was also meant to introduce a new storyline involving Eddie Brock being placed into Ravencroft Institute, as well as reveal that the gene cleanser Peter used on the Venom symbiote in season 2 didn't actually affect it. Weisman also expressed his wish to use other characters from the wider Marvel Universe that were not solely associated with Spider-Man as the series had done up to that point, such as Beast, Cyclops, Professor X, Captain America, the Hulk, and Johnny Storm. Weisman elaborated by stating he hoped the introduction of said characters into the continuity of The Spectacular Spider-Man would eventually result in spin-off shows focusing on the superhero teams these characters are associated with, the X-Men, Avengers, and Fantastic Four. Furthermore, plans for a musical-themed episode and an episode adapting issue #8 of The Amazing Spider-Man, involving an after-school boxing match between Peter and Flash Thompson, were also abandoned. After the initial 65-episode series plan and movies, which would have covered the characters' entire duration in high school, Weisman had wished to produce DVD sequels covering Peter's college years and his eventual marriage to Mary Jane as depicted in comics until 2007.

== Appearances in other media and future ==
=== Intended inclusions in other shows ===
In early 2010, shortly after the series concluded airing in the U.S., Josh Keaton was tapped to reprise the role of Peter Parker / Spider-Man in the Disney-produced animated series, The Avengers: Earth's Mightiest Heroes (2010–2012), appearing in the season 2 episodes "Along Came a Spider", "Yellowjacket", "New Avengers" and the series finale, "Avengers Assemble". Keaton would've appeared in the series alongside two of his co-stars from The Spectacular Spider-Man: Grey DeLisle, reprising her voice work as Betty Brant, and Daran Norris, who voiced J. Jonah Jameson on the series and appeared as a policeman in Earth's Mightiest Heroes. However, upon the airing of his first planned episode in Australia ahead of its debut in the U.S., it was discovered and reported by Jesse Betteridge of the Facebook page "Keep Spectacular Spider-Man Alive" that Keaton's voice had appeared to have been replaced by Drake Bell, who succeeded him as the voice of Spider-Man in the following series, Ultimate Spider-Man. Keaton would later confirm his replacement, additionally surmising that Marvel had dubbed Bell's vocals over Keaton's original performance, even though he had recorded all of his voice work for Spider-Man's respective appearances on the series. Series creator Christopher Yost would later address Keaton's involvement, revealing that Spider-Man in Earth's Mightiest Heroes was intended to share continuity with the iteration featured in The Spectacular Spider-Man, and that his debut episode was written to emulate the tone of the prior series. Despite the implicit connections, Greg Weisman dismissed the proposition, affirming that The Spectacular Spider-Man was set in its own universe.

A version of Spider-Man that resembles the look from The Spectacular Spider-Man makes a brief non-speaking cameo appearance in the Ultimate Spider-Man season 4 episode, "Return to the Spider-Verse", as one of the various Spider-Totems across the Multiverse that have their energy siphoned by the Wolf Spider. Series writer Chris Wyatt confirmed on Twitter that they had planned to incorporate Spectacular Spider-Man more prominently, but they were unable to due to the legal restrictions and were only allowed to make a variant of him used as an easter egg.

In the second season finale episode "I Thought You Were Stronger" of Invincible, Josh Keaton provides the voice for Agent Spider, a character Mark Grayson encounters during a multiverse sequence. The character adapts Spider-Man's role in the Marvel Team-Up crossover tie-in with the original Invincible comic's issue #33, part of Three's Company. Legal issues between Sony and Disney more than likely prevented the series from utilizing the iteration of the character from The Spectacular Spider-Man or any other version in past media.

=== Spider-Man: Across the Spider-Verse ===
The iteration of Peter Parker / Spider-Man from The Spectacular Spider-Man appears in the film Spider-Man: Across the Spider-Verse, depicted as a member of the Spider-Society led by Miguel O’Hara / Spider-Man 2099, with Josh Keaton reprising the role. Additionally, it is revealed that the series' version of George Stacy died similarly to his comics counterpart, after the events of the second season. Parker himself appears before Miles Morales to help him accept that being Spider-Man requires personal sacrifices, and is later seen as one of multiple Spider-People being dispatched to apprehend Morales as he flees through the Spider-Society's headquarters in an attempt to return to his home dimension Earth-1610 to stop The Spot from murdering his father Jefferson Davis on the day he too is set to become an NYPD Captain. He is also seen holding Spider-Cat on the train while Miguel gets overpowered by Miles, and is among all the other members watching Miguel send Gwen Stacy back to her home dimension, Earth-65. Archive footage of Ben Parker's death, as depicted in the season one episode "Intervention," was used in the film.

His inclusion in the film prompted positive reactions from fans of the series, as well as responses from co-showrunner Victor Cook and lead artist Sean Galloway, who were similarly appreciative of their show's acknowledgement.

=== #SaveSpectacularSpiderMan movement ===
Despite the legal troubles between Sony and Marvel, fans have continued to voice their support for the series more than a decade after its cancellation, in the hopes of more episodes being produced someday. An online petition on Change.org requesting a possible third season has managed to gather more than 24,000 signatures. On January 9, 2021, at 4:00 pm, the hashtags #SaveSpectacularSpiderMan and #SpectacularSpiderMan trended on Twitter after users created a "tweet storm" requesting for the series to return. Josh Keaton, who voices Peter Parker in the show, also responded to the trending hashtags while wearing a Spider-Man mask and staying in-character, saying, "I just wanted to shout out some support to everyone tweeting today with #SaveSpectacularSpiderMan. This much support after over a decade? Aw, you guys really know how to make a Webhead feel special!" While promoting his DC Comics animated film Catwoman: Hunted, Greg Weisman also responded to the ongoing fan campaign calling for The Spectacular Spider-Man's revival, ultimately expressing doubt as to the likelihood of the series returning, but concluding that he would "love to do it again".

== Home media ==
The series was initially developed so that each three to four-episode arc could be edited together into a feature-length home video release. The first DVD for the show, entitled "Attack of the Lizard", followed this plan with the first three episodes edited together to form a stand-alone story with additional footage. The region 1 version was released on September 9, 2008.

This release strategy changed with the region 1 release of the second and third DVDs of the series on March 17, 2009. Originally promoted with the titles "Rise of the Supervillains" and "The Goblin Strikes" respectively, these releases were revised to feature the televised versions of the episodes and were ultimately released as numbered volumes. Since then, retailer stores have stopped releasing "Attack of the Lizard" and have replaced it with volume 1. Volume 4 was released in region 1 on April 28, 2009, in the same format. "The Spectacular Spider-Man: The Complete First Season" DVD was released in region 1 on July 28, 2009. DVD volume 5 was released in region 1 on November 17, 2009. DVD volumes 6 and 7 were released on February 16, 2010. DVD volume 8 was released on April 27, 2010. The first 4 volumes that comprise season 1 for region 2 have been released, with volumes 3 and 4 having been released on August 23, 2010. To coincide with the theatrical release of The Amazing Spider-Man 2, Sony Pictures Home Entertainment released The Spectacular Spider-Man: The Complete Series on Blu-ray on April 25, 2014. On July 9, 2022, the entire series was made available to stream on Netflix, but was later removed on December 16, 2022. The series was additionally added to Disney+ on October 19, 2022. (Note: At least in the United States and some other regions. Not necessarily worldwide.) On December 4, 2023, it was removed. The series is available to stream on Amazon Prime Video through purchase.

== Reception ==
The Spectacular Spider-Man received critical acclaim, with praise being aimed at the exploration of surprisingly mature themes, the faithfulness to the source material, the vocal performances from the cast, the unique character designs and art style, the animation, and the use of clever writing while paying homage to classic stories from the comics. On review aggregator website Rotten Tomatoes, the series holds a 100% rating based on 9 reviews. Before the series premiere, Matt Sernaker of ComicsOnline interviewed some of the Spectacular Spider-Man development team at WonderCon 2008 after a preview screening and stated: "This new Spider-Man series truly is SPECTACULAR... surpasses all of the previous incarnations with ease. If you are a Spidey fan, you will not want to miss this." Early in the series' run, Alan Kistler of ComicMix called the series "one of the best superhero adaptations I've ever seen (and trust me, I've watched more than anyone will probably consider reasonable). It's fun, it's smart, it's mature, it's witty, and every episode leaves me wanting more." IGN stated that Greg Weisman "has only cemented his reputation for quality television animation with his work on Spider-Man." IGN named The Spectacular Spider-Man #30th in the Top 100 Best Animated TV Shows in January 2009. The series was also awarded Best Animated Series in both 2008 and 2009, with the series' version of the main character being named TV's Best Hero in 2008. Subsequently, it was placed second in the Top 25 Comic Book TV Shows in 2011 (behind Batman: The Animated Series).

Outside of comic resources, Variety highlighted that "although seemingly conceived largely to push a new line of Hasbro toys... the soon-to-fadeout Kids' WB (on the CW!) delivers a credible new version of 'Spider-Man,' emphasizing his relatable headaches as a 16-year-old superhero."

== Syndication ==
On June 14, 2013, Saban Brands announced that they had acquired the broadcast rights to air the series on Vortexx on The CW for the Fall 2013–14 season, marking its return to The CW since the conclusion of the first season aired on June 14, 2008.

The series officially started airing on Vortexx on August 17, 2013 and it ended on September 27, 2014.

== Toys and merchandise ==
Hasbro released a toy line of action figures in March 2008.

McDonald's Happy Meals celebrated their 30th anniversary with The Spectacular Spider-Man toys in February 2009.

In February 2010, Burger King included The Spectacular Spider-Man toys in its Kids' Meals toys range.

== See also ==
- Spider-Man: The Animated Series
- Ultimate Spider-Man
- Marvel's Spider-Man
- Your Friendly Neighborhood Spider-Man
