= Greg Weisman =

American television and comics writer

- Weisman at Dragon Con in 2026
- Born: September 28, 1963 (age 63); Los Angeles, California, U.S.
- Occupations: Writer, producer, voice actor
- Years active: 1983–present
- Known for: Gargoyles; Bonkers; The Spectacular Spider-Man; Young Justice

Greg Weisman (/ˈwaɪsmən/; born September 28, 1963) is a Jewish-American writer, producer and voice actor. He is best known as the creator of the animated series Gargoyles, The Spectacular Spider-Man and Young Justice and as a producer for the second season of W.I.T.C.H. and the first season of Star Wars Rebels.

== Early life and career ==
Weisman is a former English composition and writing teacher. He received a bachelor's degree from Stanford University and a master's from USC. Between college and graduate school, he worked on staff in the editorial department of DC Comics, while also co-writing Captain Atom with Cary Bates. In 1985, Weisman wrote a four-issue mini-series for DC Comics starring the superheroine Black Canary, which was cancelled due to the character being used in writer/artist Mike Grell's series Green Arrow: The Longbow Hunters. Elements from the project were later used for his DC Showcase: Green Arrow short film.

== Animation ==
After graduate school, Weisman worked as a development executive at Disney. There, in conjunction with others, he pitched an early comedy-adventure version of the TV series Gargoyles to Disney CEO Michael Eisner. Eventually, the idea was extensively reworked by Weisman, who brought in Michael Reaves to write the pilot five-parter. The series underwent a transformation from its initial conception as a comedy to an episodic but sequential animated action-drama, and the series was produced for syndication. Though Gargoyles bears no on-air creator credit, Weisman describes himself on his website as "one of the creators" of the show. Aired in syndication for 65 episodes, Gargoyles was later picked up for a further 13 episodes by ABC. Weisman was credited as a co-producer of Gargoyles from episode 6, and as a supervising producer for much of the show's second season, but has disassociated himself from the third season (The Goliath Chronicles), on which he received producer credit. Since 1997, Weisman has run an online website where he answers questions from fans, primarily pertaining to Gargoyles and Young Justice.

Weisman's other television credits include overseeing the first season of Max Steel, the second season of W.I.T.C.H., and both seasons of The Spectacular Spider-Man and four of Young Justice. Weisman has written episodes for numerous animated series, including Men in Black: The Series, Roughnecks: Starship Troopers Chronicles, Bonkers, and Kim Possible. He also voice directs and voice acts on occasion; he played the role of Donald Menken on The Spectacular Spider-Man and Snapper Carr on Young Justice. Weisman was also co-executive producer on Star Wars Rebels, but left the series after the first season. In 2016, it was reported that he would return in the revival season of Young Justice, alongside Brandon Vietti; the new season, titled Young Justice: Outsiders, premiered in January 2019.

== Comic books ==
Weisman also continues to write for comics, including in continuity continuations of the storylines from the television series Gargoyles and Young Justice. On the latter, Weisman, along with Kevin Hopps, became full-time writers of the tie-in comic as of issue #7 (as well as issue #0). Weisman also wrote a parody of Gargoyles and Captain Atom in JLA Showcase #1. During his time with the Star Wars franchise, Weisman wrote the miniseries Star Wars: Kanan for Lucasfilm and Marvel Comics. From 2015 to 2016, he wrote the superhero series Starbrand & Nightmask, which lasted six issues.

At San Diego Comic-Con 2022, It was announced that Dynamite Entertainment had acquired the Gargoyles license and that Weisman would serve as the writer of these new comics. In November 2023, it was announced that Weisman would write a new ongoing series for Marvel Comics dubbed The Spectacular Spider-Men, which features Peter Parker and Miles Morales teaming up and fighting supervillains together. The series also features artwork by veteran Spider-Man artist Humberto Ramos.

== Novels ==
After leaving Disney in 1996, Weisman spent two years at DreamWorks, where he created and developed a new television series called Rain of the Ghosts. When the series was not picked up, Weisman bought the property back to turn it into a series of novels. His debut novel, also titled Rain of the Ghosts, was released in 2013. Its sequel, Spirits of Ash and Foam, followed in 2014. Weisman has announced that the third book will be titled Masque of Bones, and in 2015, he released a full-cast unabridged AudioPlay based on Rain of the Ghosts after successfully crowdfunding the project through Kickstarter. In 2016, Weisman released a children's novel in the World of Warcraft universe entitled World of Warcraft: Traveler, followed by a sequel, World of Warcraft: Traveler - The Spiral Path.

Weisman's next novels were set in the Magic: The Gathering universe. War of the Spark: Ravnica was released on April 23, 2019, and made the New York Times Best Sellers List. Its sequel, War of the Spark: Forsaken, was released in November 2019. Alexander Sowa, for CBR, highlighted that "Greg Weissman's War of the Spark: Ravnica [was] infamous among fans for its misrepresentation of existing characters". Sowa commented that its sequel, War of the Spark: Forsaken, "was greeted with a lukewarm response after it infamously attempted to retcon the sexuality of one of the book's protagonists, Chandra. As a result, the game's publisher, Wizards of the Coast, released an official apology for the novel's poor handling of the subject and canceled plans for the book that was intended for the game's next set, Theros: Beyond Death". Reactions to the sequel were "overwhelmingly negative" and it was "lambasted for its disappointing prose, lack of understanding of character voice, and failure to provide any emotional payoff for the relationships that have been set up in the world of Magic. One aspect that has been called out, in particular, is the biphobic language and erasure around the relationship between the Planeswalkers Chandra Nalaar and Nissa Revane". Weisman issued an apology highlighting the "mutual creative/editorial process with WotC and Del Rey" for Chandra's characterization. Wizards of the Coast made a further announcement that they would no longer censor the content in Magic: The Gathering novels to "accommodate foreign content restrictions".

== Bibliography ==
=== Comic books ===
==== DC Comics ====
Year	Title	Issue(s)	Notes	Ref(s)
1986	All-Star Squadron	63–64	Editor	
1986–87	Who's Who: The Definitive Directory of the DC Universe	16–26	Writer	
1987–88	Secret Origins	17–23	Editor	
1987–91	Captain Atom	10–50	Co-writer (with Cary Bates)	
1988	Young All-Stars	8–9	Editor	
2011–13	Young Justice	0, 7–25	Writer (with Kevin Hopps)	
2017	The Fall and Rise of Captain Atom	1–6	Co-writer (with Cary Bates)	
2019	Young Justice: Outsiders (digital comic)	1–2	Writer	
2022	Young Justice: Targets	1-6	Writer	

==== Marvel Comics ====
Year	Title	Issue(s)	Notes	Ref(s)
2010	Star Wars: Kanan	1–12	Writer	
2016	Starbrand & Nightmask	1–6	Writer	
2024	The Spectacular Spider-Men	1-15	Writer	
2025	Fantastic Four x Gargoyles	1	Writer	

==== SLG Comics ====
Year	Title	Issue(s)	Notes	Ref(s)
2006–09	Gargoyles	1–12	Writer	
2007–09	Gargoyles: Bad Guys	1–6	Writer	

==== Dynamite Entertainment ====
Year	Title	Issue(s)	Notes	Ref(s)
2025	Gargoyles x Fantastic Four	1	Writer	

=== Novels ===
Year	Title	Publisher	Series	Identifier(s)	Ref(s)
2013	Rain of the Ghosts	St. Martin's Press	Rain of the Ghosts	ISBN 978-1250029799; LCCN 2013-25225; OCLC 861358411	
2014	Spirits of Ash and Foam	St. Martin's Press	Rain of the Ghosts	ISBN 978-1250029829; LCCN 2014-8059; OCLC 881444430	
2016	World of Warcraft: Traveler	Scholastic Corporation	Warcraft	ISBN 978-0545906678; LCCN 2017-296008; OCLC 1001310567	
2018	World of Warcraft: Traveler – The Spiral Path	Scholastic Corporation	Warcraft	ISBN 978-1338029376; OCLC 1027992652	
2019	War of the Spark: Ravnica	Del Rey Books	Magic: The Gathering	ISBN 978-1984817457	
2019	War of the Spark: Forsaken	Del Rey Books	Magic: The Gathering	ISBN 978-1984817945	

== Filmography ==
=== Film ===
Year	Title	Role	Director(s)	Notes	Ref(s)
2000	3×3 Eyes	Hide	Daisuke Nishio; Kazuhisa Takenōchi; Kazuhisa Takenōchi	Voice director and story editor (English dub); Direct-to-video series	
2003	Atlantis: Milo's Return	—N/a	Victor Cook; Toby Shelton; Tad Stones	Voice director Direct-to-video	
2003	Bionicle: Mask of Light	—N/a	Terry Shakespeare; David Molina	Writer; Direct-to-video	
2010	DC Showcase: Green Arrow	—N/a	Joaquim Dos Santos	Writer; Direct-to-video	
2022	Catwoman: Hunted	—N/a	Shinsuke Teresawa	Writer; Direct-to-video	

=== Television ===
Year	Title	Role	Notes	Ref(s)
1988	Jem	—N/a	Writer: "Video Wars"	
1992	Raw Toonage	—N/a	Development executive	
1993–1994	Bonkers	—N/a	Development executive	
1994–1997	Gargoyles	Commando (episode: "Awakening")	Also supervising producer	
1998–1999	Men in Black: The Series	—N/a	Writer	
1999	Hercules	—N/a	Writer	
1999	Big Guy and Rusty the Boy Robot	—N/a	Writer: "Out of Whack"	
1999–2000	Roughnecks: Starship Troopers Chronicles	—N/a	Writer and story editor	
2000	Max Steel	—N/a	Co-developer, writer and producer	
2000	Buzz Lightyear of Star Command	—N/a	Writer	
2003	The Mummy	—N/a	Writer	
2003, 2007	Kim Possible	—N/a	Writer	
2004–2011	Ikki Tousen	Moutoku Sousou	Voice, English dub	
2004–2005	Super Robot Monkey Team Hyperforce Go!	—N/a	Writer	
2004–2007	The Batman	—N/a	Writer	
2006	W.I.T.C.H.	—N/a	Writer and supervising producer	
2006–2007	Ben 10	—N/a	Writer	
2007	Legion of Super Heroes	—N/a	Writer: "The Man from the Edge of Tomorrow: Part 2"	
2008–2009	The Spectacular Spider-Man	Donald Menken	Voice; also co-developer, writer and supervising producer	
2009–2011	Batman: The Brave and the Bold	—N/a	Writer	
2010–2022	Young Justice	Lucas Carr, Ultra-Humanite, Lobo's Belt	Voice; also co-developer, writer and producer	
2013	Kaijudo: Rise of the Duel Masters	—N/a	Writer	
2013	Transformers: Prime	—N/a	Writer	
2014–2015	Transformers: Rescue Bots	—N/a	Writer	
2014–2015	Stormtroopers		Voice; also writer and executive producer	
2014	Beware the Batman	—N/a	Writer: "Monsters"	
2015	Teenage Mutant Ninja Turtles	—N/a	Writer: "Eyes of the Chimera"	
2016–2017	Shimmer and Shine	—N/a	Staff writer	
2025	Transformers: EarthSpark	—N/a	Writer: "Hometown Heroes" and "Legacy of Hope"	

=== Video games ===
Year	Title	Role	Notes	Ref(s)
2008	The Last Remnant	Additional Voices		
2013	Young Justice: Legacy	Tourist, Undead Soldier	Also writer and creative consultant	

=== Audiobooks ===
Year	Title	Role
2015	Rain of the Ghosts	Opie / Narrator
