= Spider-Man: Across the Spider-Verse =

2023 animated superhero film

- Theatrical release poster
- Directed by: Joaquim Dos Santos; Kemp Powers; Justin K. Thompson
- Written by: Phil Lord Christopher Miller; Dave Callaham
- Based on: Marvel Comics
- Produced by: Phil Lord; Christopher Miller; Amy Pascal; Avi Arad; Christina Steinberg
- Starring: Shameik Moore; Hailee Steinfeld; Brian Tyree Henry; Luna Lauren Velez; Jake Johnson; Jason Schwartzman; Issa Rae; Karan Soni; Shea Whigham; Greta Lee; Daniel Kaluuya; Mahershala Ali; Oscar Isaac
- Edited by: Michael Andrews
- Music by: Daniel Pemberton
- Production companies: Columbia Pictures; Marvel Entertainment; Sony Pictures Animation; Pascal Pictures; Lord Miller Productions; Arad Productions
- Distributed by: Sony Pictures Releasing
- Release dates: May 30, 2023 (Regency Village Theater); June 2, 2023 (United States)
- Running time: 140 minutes
- Country: United States
- Language: English
- Budget: $125 million
- Box office: $690.8 million

Spider-Man: Across the Spider-Verse is a 2023 American animated superhero film based on the Marvel Comics character Miles Morales / Spider-Man. Directed by Joaquim Dos Santos, Kemp Powers and Justin K. Thompson from a screenplay by the writing team of Phil Lord and Christopher Miller and Dave Callaham, it is the sequel to Spider-Man: Into the Spider-Verse (2018) and the second film in the animated Spider-Verse franchise. Shameik Moore stars as Miles Morales, with Hailee Steinfeld, Brian Tyree Henry, Luna Lauren Velez, Jake Johnson, Jason Schwartzman, Issa Rae, Karan Soni, Shea Whigham, Greta Lee, Daniel Kaluuya, Mahershala Ali, and Oscar Isaac in supporting roles. In the film, Miles goes on an adventure with Gwen Stacy (Steinfeld) across the multiverse, where he meets a team of Spider-People known as the Spider-Society. It was produced by Columbia Pictures and Sony Pictures Animation in association with Marvel Entertainment.

Sony began developing a sequel to Into the Spider-Verse prior to its 2018 release, with the writing and directing team attached. It was set to focus on the relationship between Moore's Miles and Steinfeld's Gwen. The sequel was officially announced in November 2019 and animation work began in June 2020, with a different visual style for each of the six universes visited by the characters. It had a budget of $100–150 million, and with a theatrical runtime of 140 minutes, the film was the longest American animated film by runtime at the time of its release.

Spider-Man: Across the Spider-Verse premiered at the Regency Village Theatre in Los Angeles, California on May 30, 2023, and was released in the United States on June 2, having been delayed from its original April 2022 theatrical release date. Like its predecessor, the film received critical acclaim and it set several box office records, grossing over $690 million at the worldwide box office, surpassing its predecessor and becoming the third-highest-grossing film of the year domestically in the United States, the highest-grossing film produced by Sony Pictures Animation, and the sixth-highest-grossing film of 2023. The American Film Institute named Spider-Man: Across the Spider-Verse one of the top-ten films of 2023. Among its numerous accolades, it won Best Animated Feature at the Critics' Choice Movie Awards, Annie Awards, and Producers Guild of America Awards, and received nominations for the same category at the Golden Globe Awards, BAFTA Awards, and Academy Awards.

The third film in the trilogy, Spider-Man: Beyond the Spider-Verse, is scheduled for release on June 18, 2027, while two spin-off films, Spider-Women and Spider-Punk, are in development.

== Plot ==
On Earth-65, Spider-Woman Gwen Stacy has become increasingly isolated from her friends and estranged from her father George Stacy. George is hunting Spider-Woman for killing Peter Parker, unaware that it was an accident after Peter turned into the Lizard. Gwen encounters an alternate version of the Vulture, and Miguel O'Hara and Jess Drew arrive through dimensional portals to help neutralize him. George corners Gwen and she reveals her identity to him. He attempts to arrest her before she leaves with Jess and Miguel.

On Earth-1610, 16 months after the destruction of the Alchemax collider, (Note: As depicted in Spider-Man: Into the Spider-Verse (2018)) Miles Morales is struggling with his duties as Spider-Man interfering with his personal life and is grounded when he is late to a party celebrating his father Jeff's promotion to police captain. After he runs away with Gwen, his parents extend his punishment. Miles encounters the Spot, an Alchemax scientist whose body was infused with portals during the collider's destruction. The Spot blames Miles for his mutation and reveals that the radioactive spider that gave Miles his powers came from an alternate universe, Earth-42, while the Spot was testing the collider. The Spot unwittingly transports himself into a void and learns to use his portals to traverse other universes and empower himself by using Alchemax colliders in other dimensions. Gwen travels to Miles' dimension and they reconnect, sharing their struggles. Miles attempts to convey his feelings for Gwen, but she fears that a Gwen Stacy falling for Spider-Man never ends well.

Gwen secretly tracks the Spot and opens a portal to the next universe: Earth-50101. Miles discreetly follows Gwen into the portal, and the two team up with Earth-50101's local Spider-Man Pavitr Prabhakar, and later Hobie Brown, against the Spot. The Spot absorbs the power of that dimension's collider, and he and Miles share a vision of his future attacks, which include the deaths of Jeff and Police Inspector Singh, the father of Pavitr's girlfriend Gayatri. The Spot escapes and Miles saves Singh from the collider's destruction, but the world begins to collapse before other Spider-People arrive to contain the damage.

Miles, Gwen, and Hobie are taken to Nueva York in Earth-928, where a multiversal society of Spider-People, known as the Spider-Society, work together to combat multiversal threats. Miles meets Miguel, the leader of the Society, and reunites with Peter B. Parker, who introduces him to his infant daughter, Mayday. Miguel explains to Miles that each Spider-Person's story contains "canon events", such as the death of a police captain close to Spider-Man, which cannot be disrupted; otherwise, that universe may collapse, which in turn could collapse the entire multiverse as a consequence. Miles realizes that the Spot killing Jeff is a canon event.

Miles is imprisoned by Miguel after refusing to abandon Jeff. Miles frees himself with help from Hobie and flees with the Society in pursuit. Miguel corners Miles and reveals that he was never supposed to be Spider-Man; the spider from Earth-42 was not supposed to bite him, resulting in Earth-42 lacking a Spider-Man, the Spot's creation, and the death of Earth-1610's Peter Parker. Miles overpowers Miguel and, with help from Margo Kess, escapes Miguel's universe. Gwen defends Miles and is exiled to her own universe by Miguel.

At home, Gwen and George reconcile when he reveals he has resigned from the force instead of arresting her, preventing his canon event. George gives Gwen a makeshift portal device left for her by Hobie. Gwen travels back to Earth-1610 and searches for Miles, as do members of the Society. Miles tries to reveal his secret identity to his mother Rio, much to her confusion. Miles and Gwen realize that he is on Earth-42, where Miles' late uncle Aaron Davis is alive while Jeff is dead, and New York is crime-ridden due to the lack of a Spider-Man.

Aaron restrains Miles and is joined by Earth-42's counterpart of Miles, the Prowler. As the Spot prepares his attack on Earth-1610's New York, Gwen promises Rio and Jeff of that universe to bring back Miles, and teams up with Peter B., Mayday, Pavitr, Hobie, Margo, Spider-Man Noir, Peni Parker, and Spider-Ham, while Miles prepares to escape.

== Voice cast ==
An early poster for the film displaying numerous Spider-People appearing in the film. In May 2023, co-director Justin K. Thompson confirmed that the film includes 280 (later expanded to around 630) variations of Spider-Man, 95 (later 150) of which are unique and named characters.

- Shameik Moore as Miles Morales / Spider-Man: A teenager who took over as the Spider-Man of Earth-1610 after the death of his reality's Peter Parker by Kingpin
- Hailee Steinfeld as Gwen Stacy / Spider-Gwen / Spider-Woman: A version of Gwen Stacy who is the Spider-Woman of Earth-65, where she is a wanted fugitive since accidentally killing her reality's Peter Parker who had turned into the Lizard.
- Brian Tyree Henry as Jefferson Morales (ne Davis): Miles' father and a police officer, who was recently promoted to captain.
- Lauren Vélez as Rio Morales: Miles' mother, a nurse. Vélez also plays an alternate version of Rio from Earth-42.
- Jake Johnson as Peter B. Parker / Spider-Man: An older Spider-Man from Earth-616B who was a mentor to Miles. He is now married to his reality's Mary Jane "MJ" Watson and has a daughter named Mayday.
- Jason Schwartzman as Johnathon Ohnn / the Spot: A former scientist from Alchemax-turned-supervillain after an accident, whose body is now covered by interdimensional portals that allow him to travel through space and different universes. The Spot was not originally the film's main antagonist, being dismissed at first by Phil Lord and Christopher Miller when producer Avi Arad suggested using him, but this changed after the potential of his powers was discussed.
- Issa Rae as Jess Drew / Spider-Woman: A pregnant Spider-Woman from Earth-332 who is Miguel's right-hand and rides a motorcycle. Unlike most Spider-People, Jess does not maintain a secret identity.
- Karan Soni as Pavitr Prabhakar / Spider-Man India: A version of Spider-Man from Earth-50101 whose wrist bands act as web slingers, and lives in Mumbattan (a portmanteau of Mumbai and Manhattan)
- Shea Whigham as George Stacy, Gwen's father and a police captain
- Greta Lee as Lyla, Miguel and the Spider Society's AI assistant
- Daniel Kaluuya as Hobie Brown / Spider-Punk: A punk rock version of Spider-Man from Earth-138 who uses his guitar as his main weapon
- Mahershala Ali as Aaron Davis, the Earth-42 version of Miles' deceased uncle (Ali previously voiced the Earth-1610 version of Aaron in the first film)
- Oscar Isaac as Miguel O'Hara / Spider-Man 2099: A "ninja-vampire" Spider-Man from Earth-928 set in the year 2099, who is the leader of the Spider-Society, a group of Spider-People from alternate universes tasked with protecting the multiverse. Isaac described Miguel as "the one Spider-Man that doesn't have a sense of humor".

Additional voice cast includes: Jorma Taccone as Adriano Tumino / Vulture, a supervillain from an Italian Renaissance-inspired universe, and Jharrel Jerome as Miles G. Morales / Prowler of Earth-42.

Additional iterations of Spider-Man appearing in the film as members of the Spider-Society, with speaking roles, include Andy Samberg as Ben Reilly / Scarlet Spider; Amandla Stenberg as Margo Kess / Spider-Byte, a Spider-Woman remotely operating a virtual avatar from her home reality; Kimiko Glenn as Peni Parker / SP//dr, reprising her role from the first film; Taran Killam as Patrick O'Hara / Web-Slinger; Mike Rianda as Ezekiel Sims / Spider-Therapist; Sofia Barclay as Malala Windsor / Spider-UK, an original incarnation of Spider-UK who wears a hijab; Danielle Perez as Charlotte Webber / Sun-Spider, a fan-created character who uses a wheelchair; and Metro Boomin, who composed music for the film, as Metro Spider-Man.

Iterations of Spider-Man from various media also appearing in the film as members of the Spider Society include Peter Parker / Spider-Man from the television series Spider-Man Unlimited (1999–2001), Nic Novicki as Peter Parker / Lego Spider-Man, Josh Keaton as Peter Parker / Spectacular Spider-Man from the television series The Spectacular Spider-Man (2008–2009), Yuri Lowenthal as Peter Parker / Insomniac Spider-Man from the Marvel's Spider-Man video game series by Insomniac Games, and Peter Parker / Spider-Man from the 1967 animated series, also voiced by Jorma Taccone, which he reprises from the post-credits of Into the Spider-Verse.

Melissa Sturm voices Mary Jane "MJ" Parker, Peter B. Parker's wife and Mayday's mother; Rachel Dratch voices C. Weber, a counselor at Miles' school; and Ziggy Marley voices Lenny, a Jamaican shop owner. Pixar animator and filmmaker Peter Sohn provides the voice for Miles' best friend and roommate Ganke Lee after his dialogue was cut from Into the Spider-Verse. Elizabeth Perkins voices the Aunt May of Gwen's Earth-65; Atsuko Okatsuka voices Yuri Watanabe, a police colleague of Captain Stacy; Ayo Edebiri, Antonia Lentini, and Nicole Delaney voice Gwen's bandmates Glory, Betty and MJ; and Jack Quaid voices the Earth-65 Peter Parker who died after transforming into the Lizard. J. K. Simmons reprises his role as J. Jonah Jameson, voicing various versions of the character on AU Earth-1610, Earth-42, and Earth-65 with archive audio from other Spider-Man media being used for the Lego version on Earth-13122.

Live-action roles are also featured in the film, with Donald Glover appearing as an alternate version of Aaron Davis / Prowler, reprising his role from the Marvel Cinematic Universe (MCU) film Spider-Man: Homecoming (2017). Peggy Lu reprises her role as convenience store owner Mrs. Chen from the Sony's Spider-Man Universe (SSU), identified as Earth-688. Tobey Maguire, Andrew Garfield, Kirsten Dunst, and Bryce Dallas Howard appear in their respective roles as Peter Parker / Spider-Man, Mary Jane Watson, and Gwen Stacy from previous Spider-Man films through archival footage, as well as Cliff Robertson as his version of Ben Parker and Denis Leary as George Stacy. Archival audio of Alfred Molina's Otto Octavius / Doctor Octopus from Spider-Man: No Way Home (2021) is used for a hologram version of the character with a comic book-accurate design. Archival audio of John Mulaney as Peter Porker / Spider-Ham from the first film is used in the film before his character reappears in a non-speaking cameo at the end. Archival stills of Chloe Bennet's Daisy Johnson / Quake from the MCU television series Agents of S.H.I.E.L.D. (2013–2020) are used for a newspaper clipping Miles keeps on a noticeboard in his bedroom.

== Production ==
=== Development ===
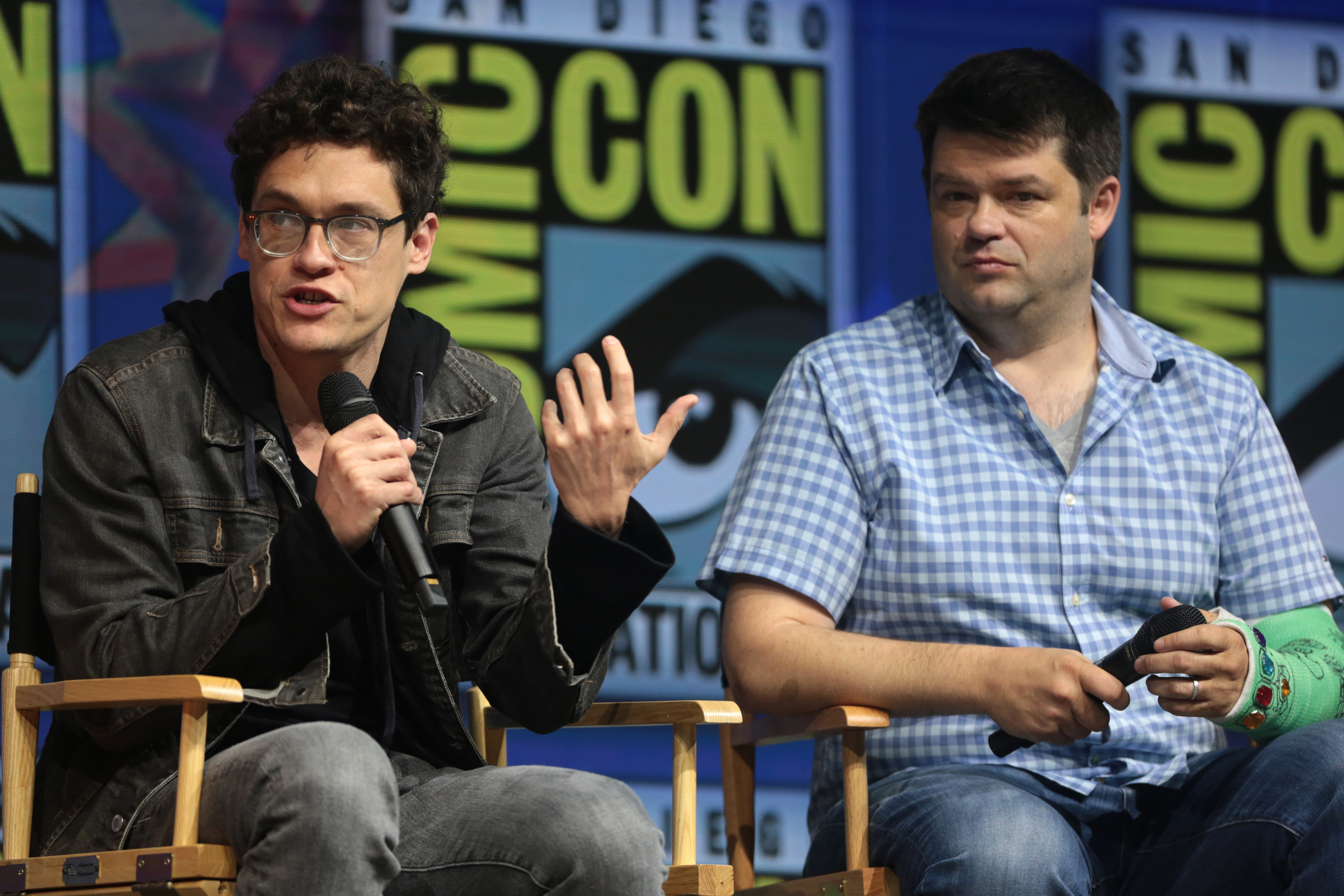
Co-writers and producers Phil Lord and Christopher Miller

By the end of November 2018, ahead of the release of Spider-Man: Into the Spider-Verse (2018) the following month, Sony Pictures Animation had begun developing a sequel due to the "incredible buzz" surrounding the project. The sequel was to continue the story of Miles Morales / Spider-Man, working from "seeds [that were] planted" throughout the first film. Joaquim Dos Santos and David Callaham were set to direct and write, respectively, with Amy Pascal returning from the first film as producer. The other producers of the first film—Phil Lord, Christopher Miller, Avi Arad, and Christina Steinberg—were all also expected to return in some capacities. The next month, Pascal revealed that the film would focus on Miles and Gwen Stacy / Spider-Woman, exploring a romance between the characters that was cut from the first film, and that the sequel would be a "launching pad" for a previously announced female-focused spin-off film featuring Gwen. Sony officially confirmed the sequel in November 2019, with Lord and Miller returning as producers and a release date of April 8, 2022, announced. In April 2020, Sony shifted the film's release to October 7, 2022.

In February 2021, Miller said that he and Lord were working on the film's screenplay with Callaham, and that Peter Ramsey would be an executive producer on the sequel after co-directing the first film. Before even finalizing a script or choosing a villain and alternate universes to visit, though, the production team decided the film had to be a story about family, focused on the struggle of being both "a son and a Spider-Man". That April, Kemp Powers and Justin K. Thompson were announced as co-directors alongside Dos Santos and that all three had worked on the project since it began (Thompson was production designer on the first film). Arad and Steinberg were confirmed to return as producers with Lord, Miller and Pascal, with Alonzo Ruvalcaba co-producing and Aditya Sood, Into the Spider-Verse directors Bob Persichetti and Rodney Rothman, and Rebecca Karch and Brian Michael Bendis joining Ramsey as executive producers.

In December, Lord and Miller revealed that the film was being split into two parts: Spider-Man: Across the Spider-Verse (Part One) and (Part Two), because they had written the story they wanted to tell for the sequel and realized it was too much for one film. Work on both parts was taking place simultaneously. The sequels were renamed in April 2022, becoming Spider-Man: Across the Spider-Verse and Spider-Man: Beyond the Spider-Verse. Their release dates were shifted then, with Across the Spider-Verse pushed back to June 2, 2023. Lord and Miller said that they had told Sony the sequel would be the same size as Into the Spider-Verse, but it ended up having the largest crew of any animated film ever, with around 1,000 people working on it. They added that the film had 240 characters and would take place across six universes. Characters that were considered to appear in Across the Spider-Verse but were ultimately rejected include versions of Green Goblin, Doctor Octopus, Kraven the Hunter, Mysterio, Electro, Shocker, Rhino, Hobgoblin, Chameleon, Puma, Leap-Frog, Alistair Smythe, Grizzly, Boomerang, Screwball, Big Wheel, Beetle, and Diamondhead.

=== Casting ===
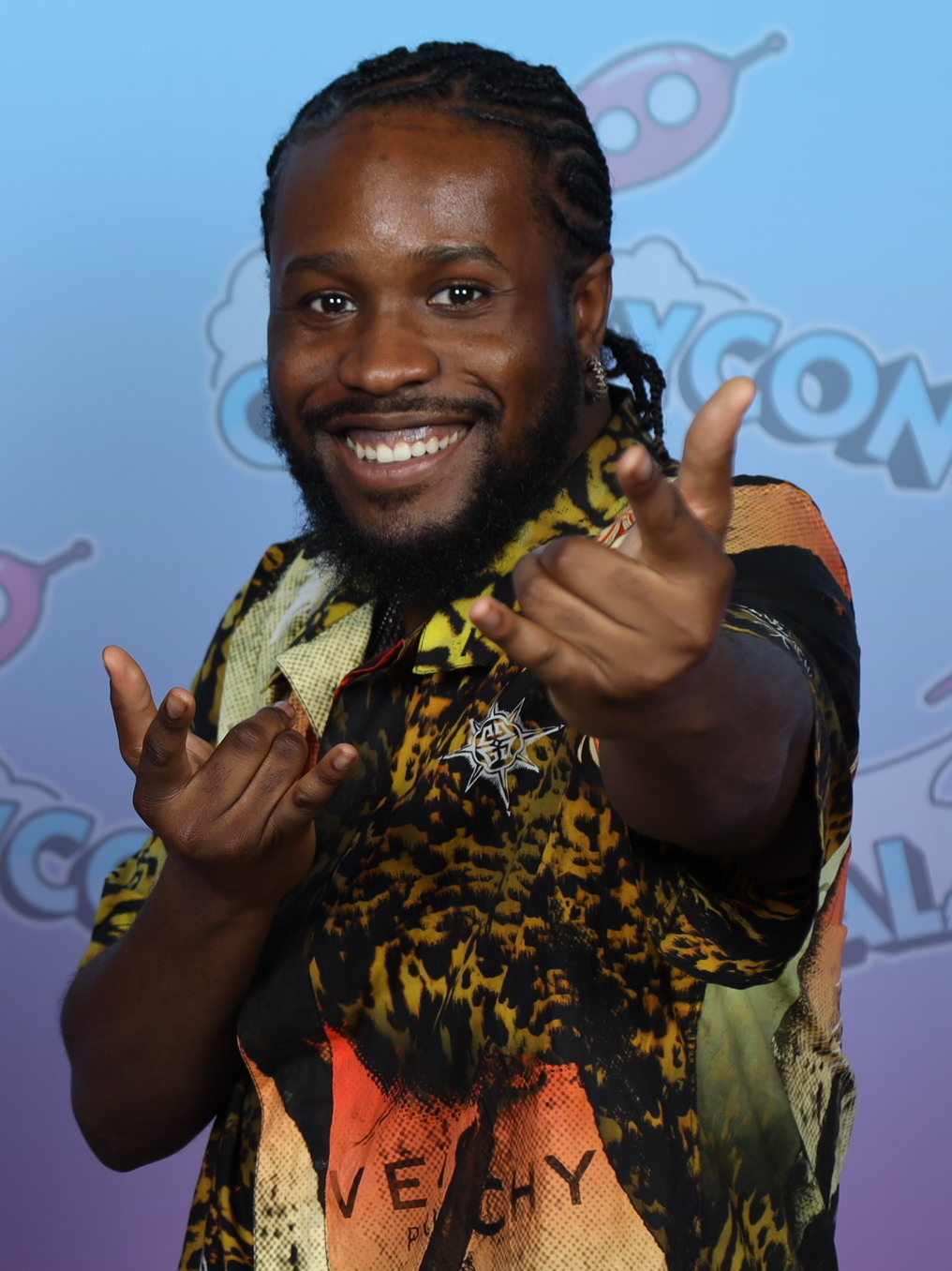
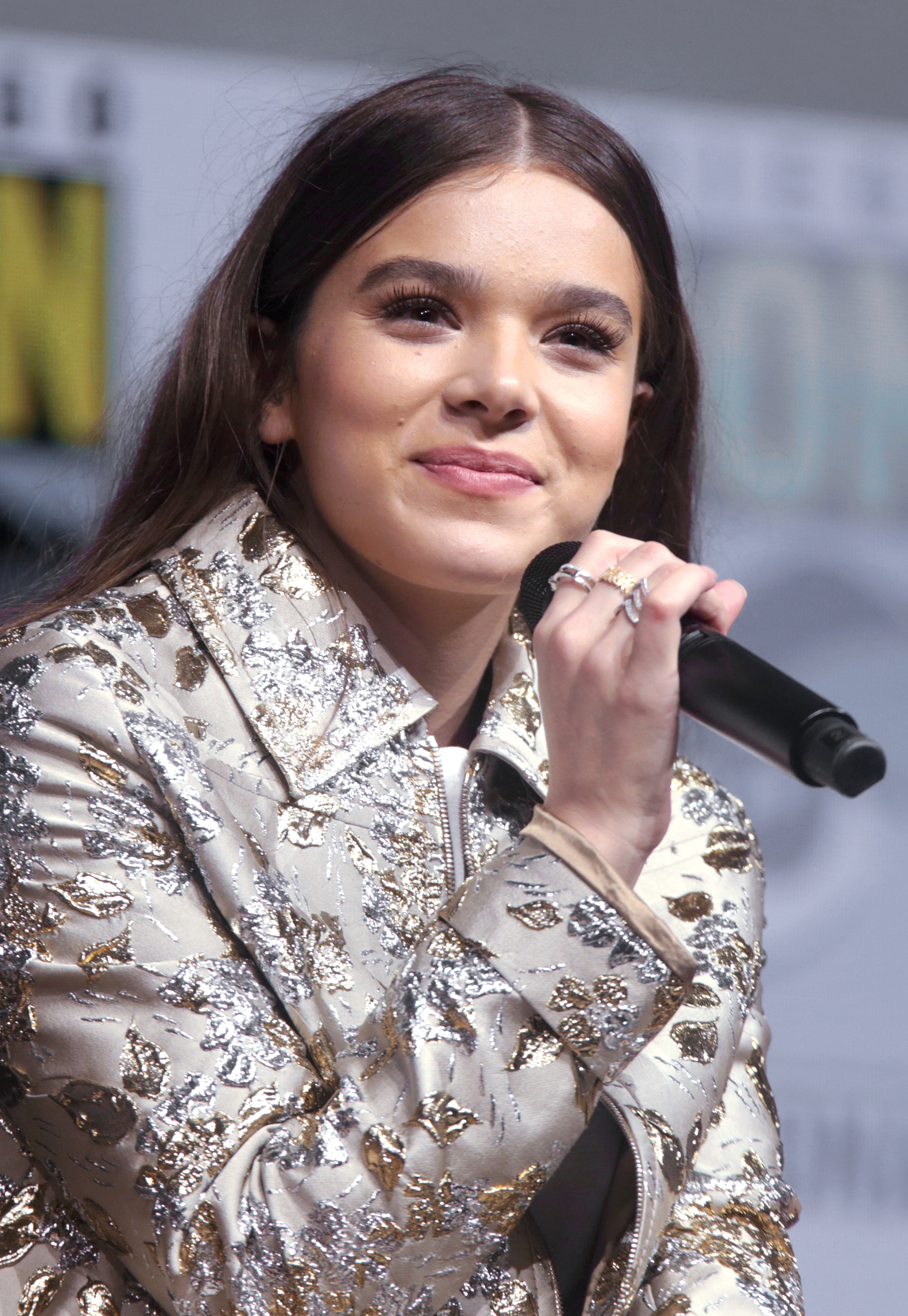
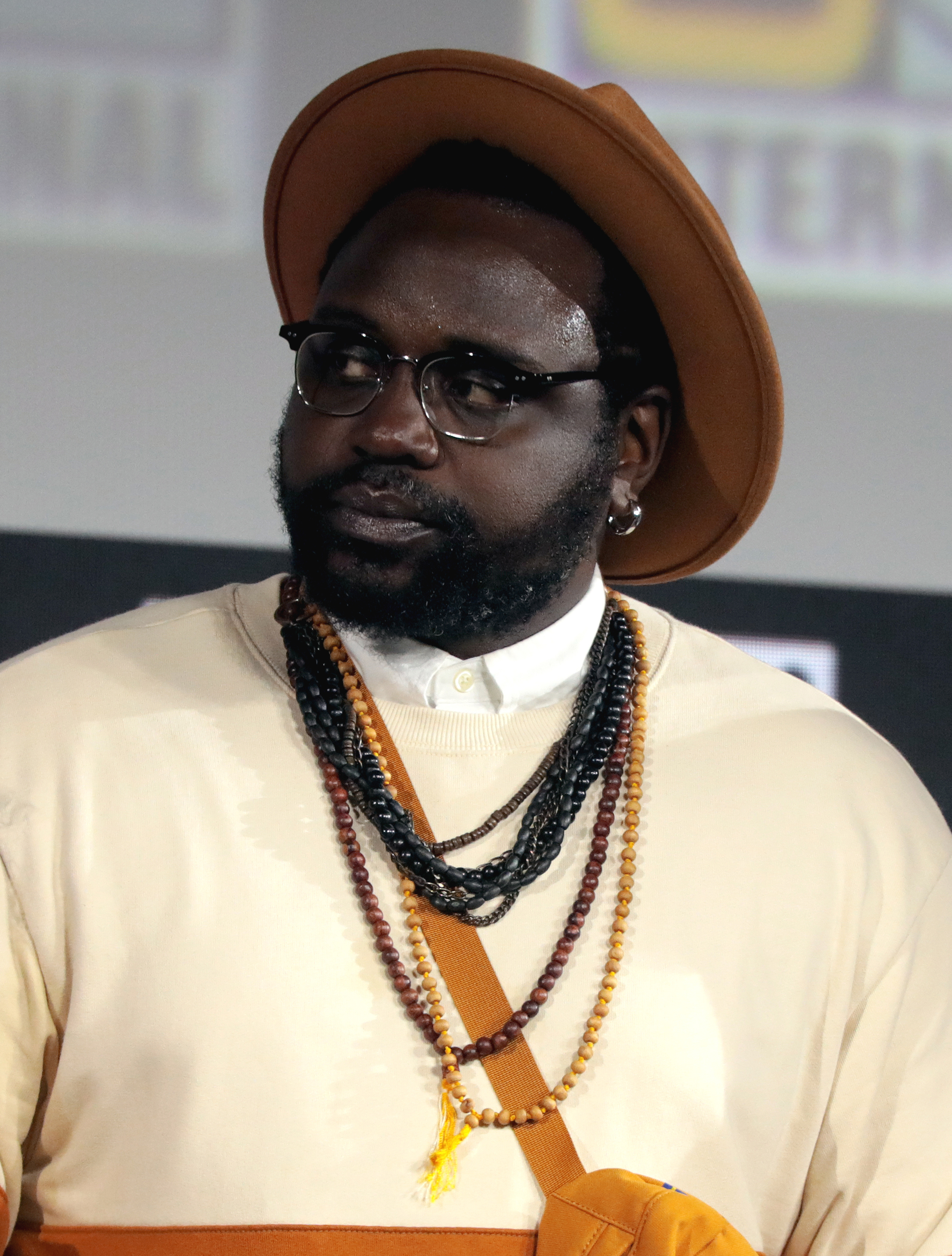
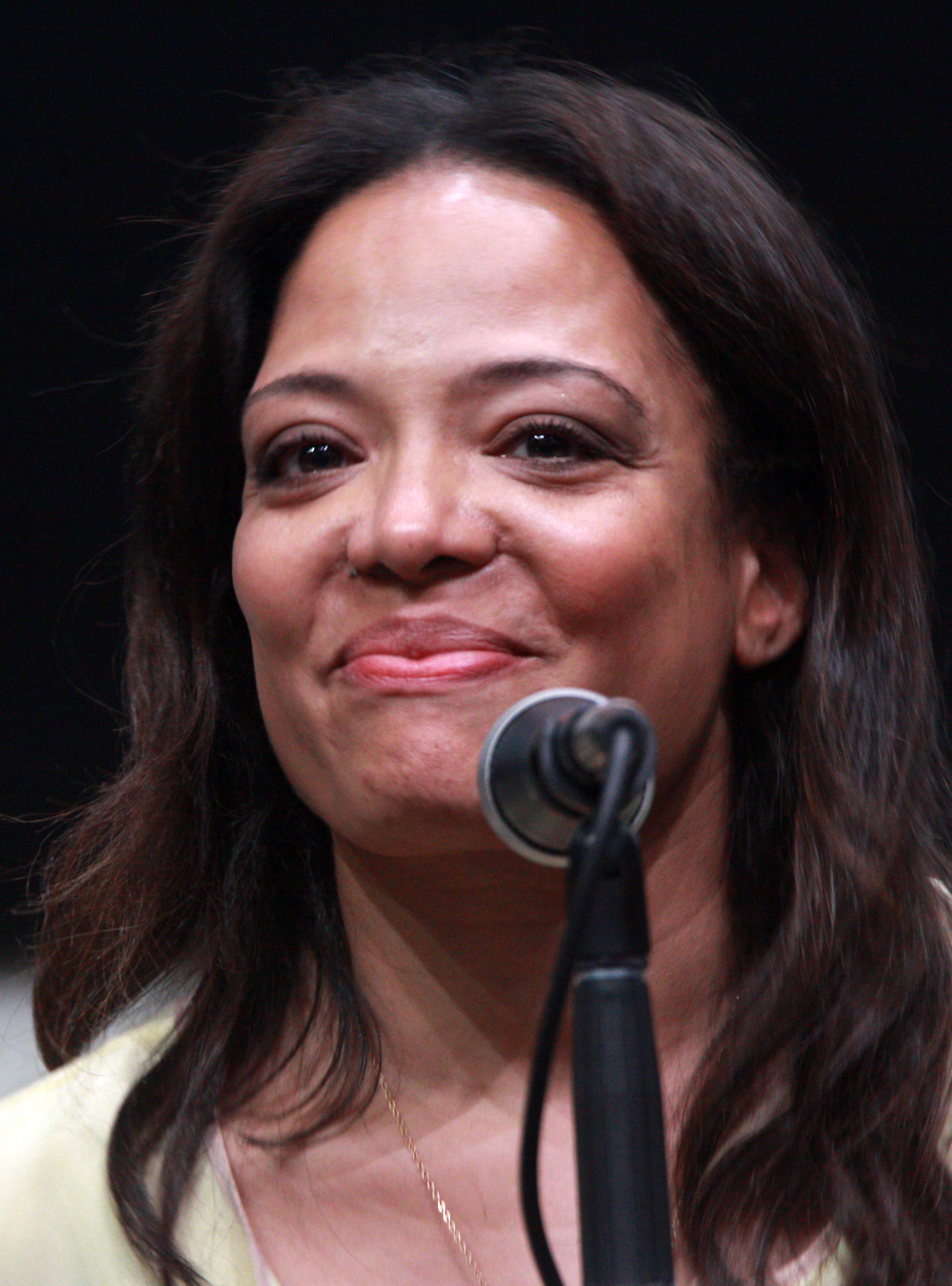
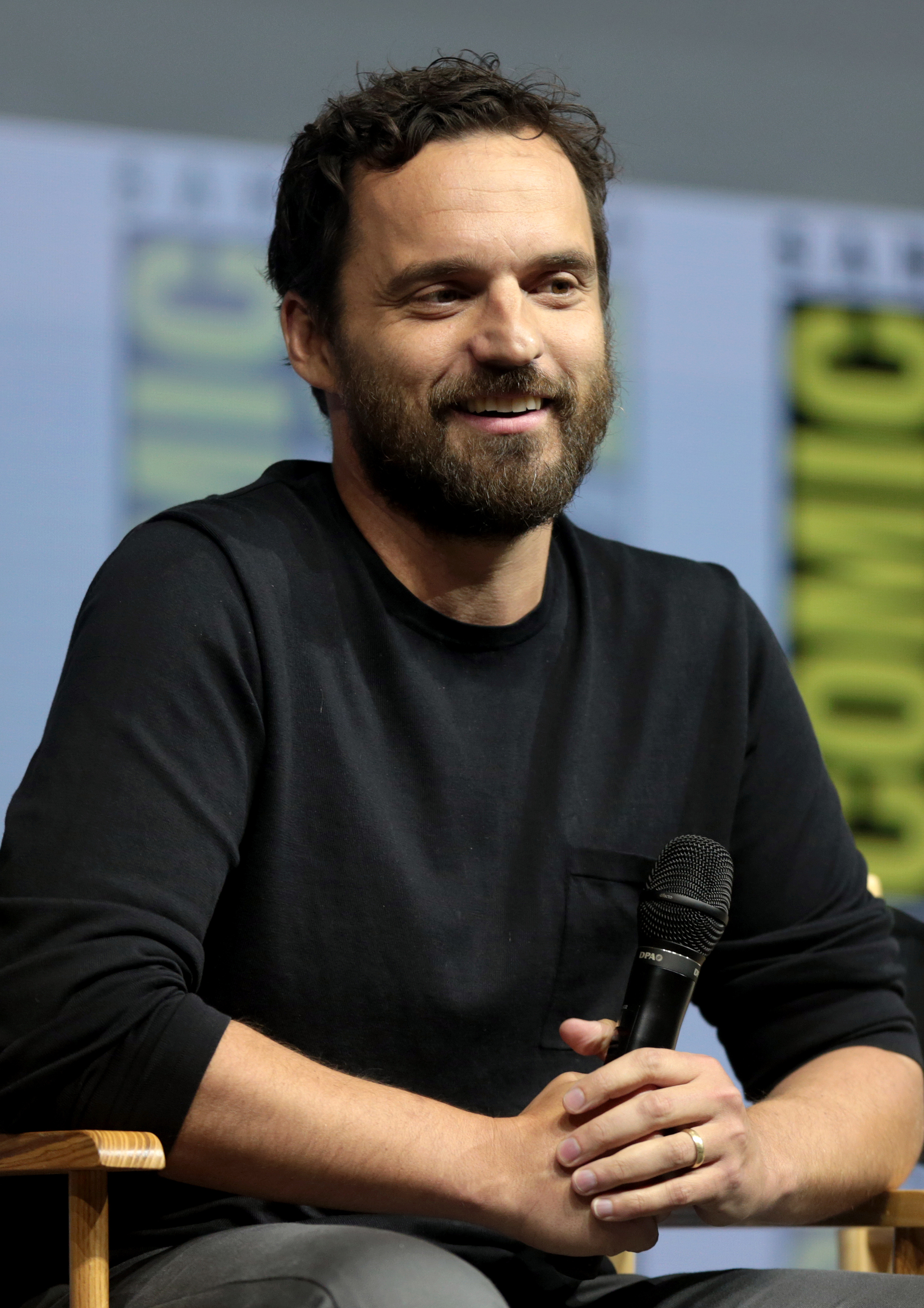
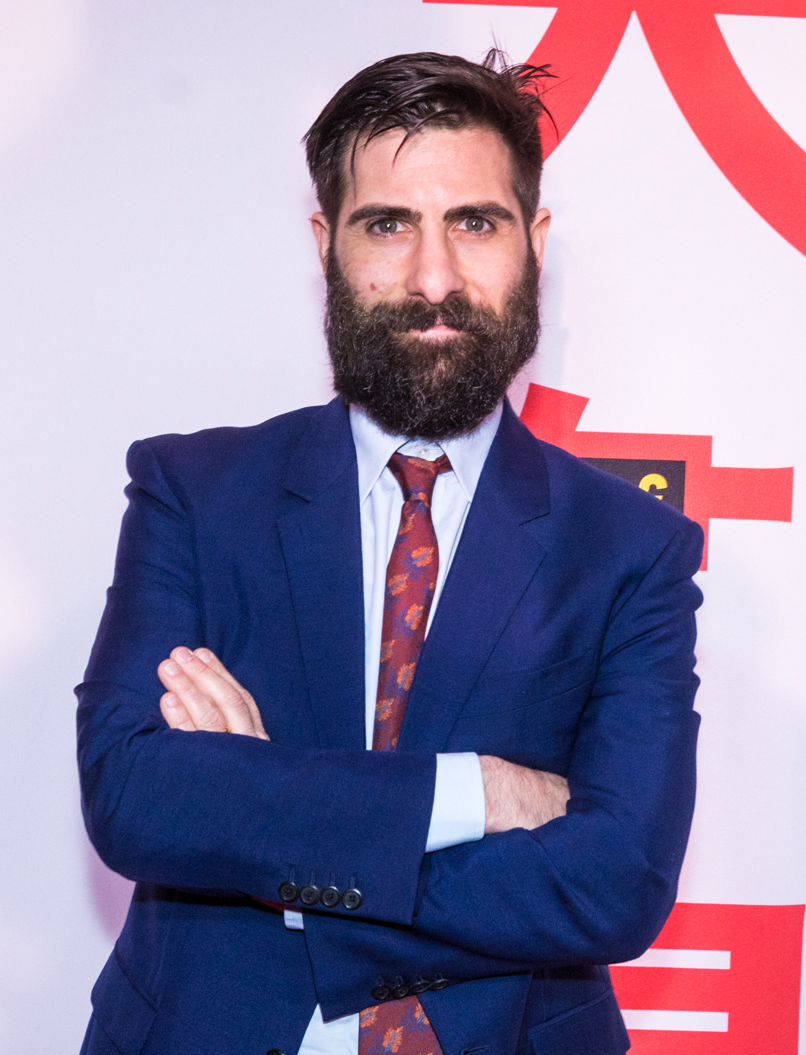
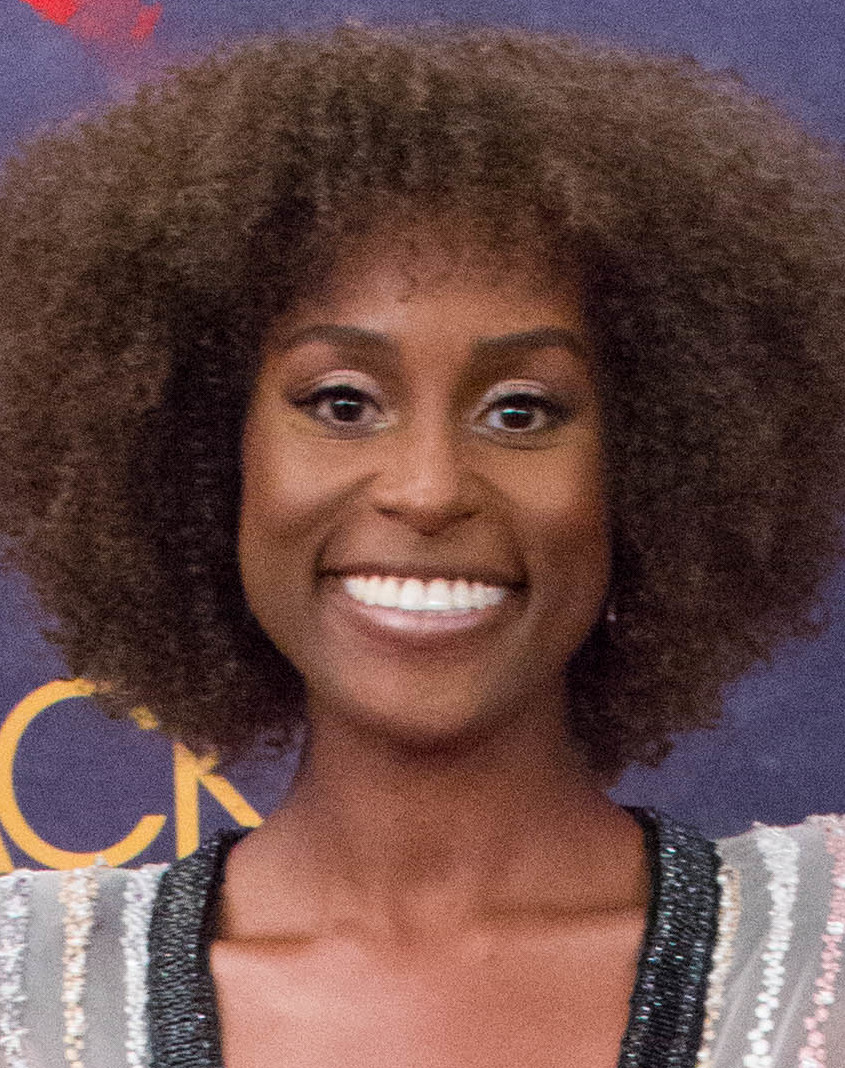
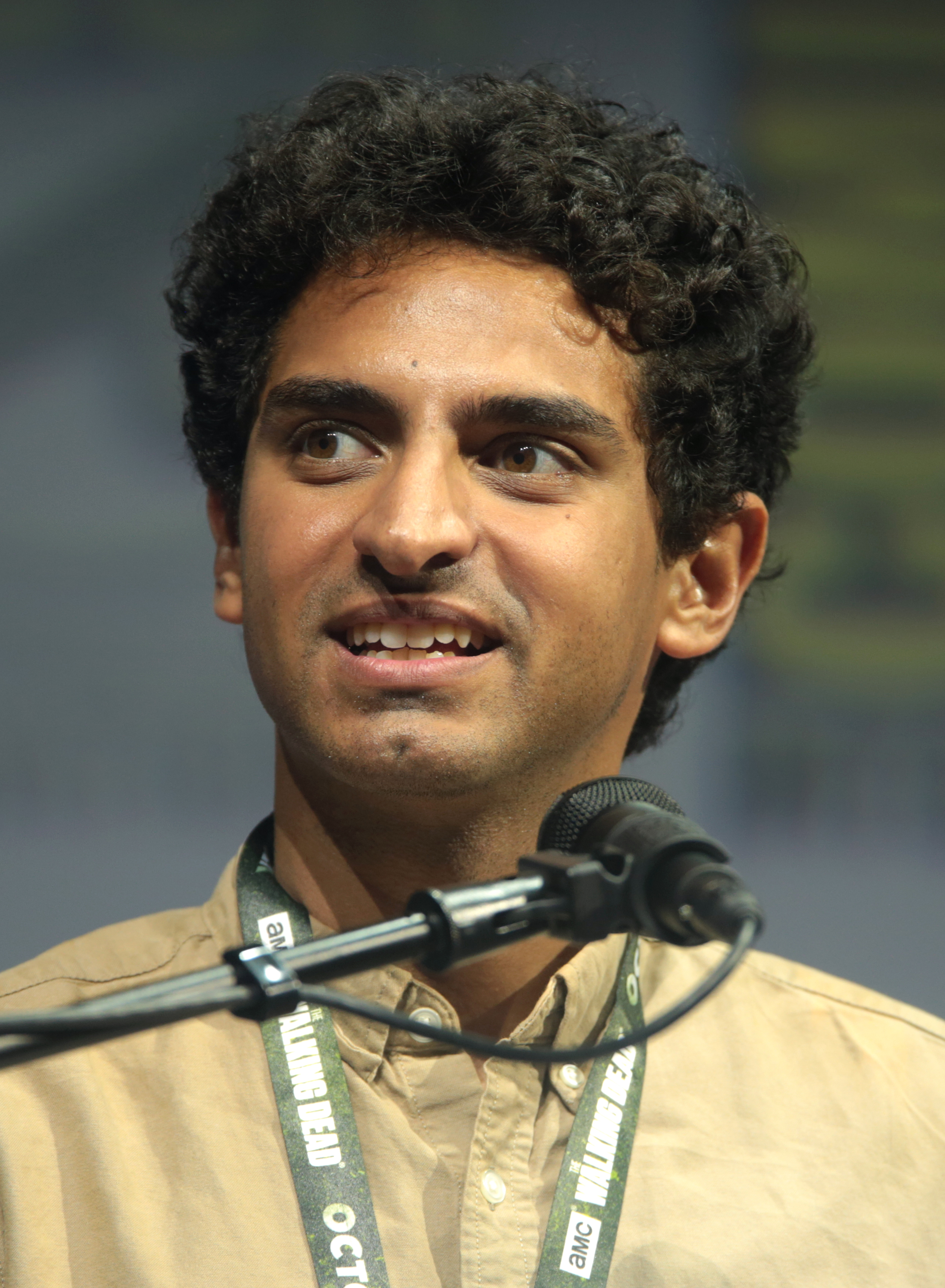
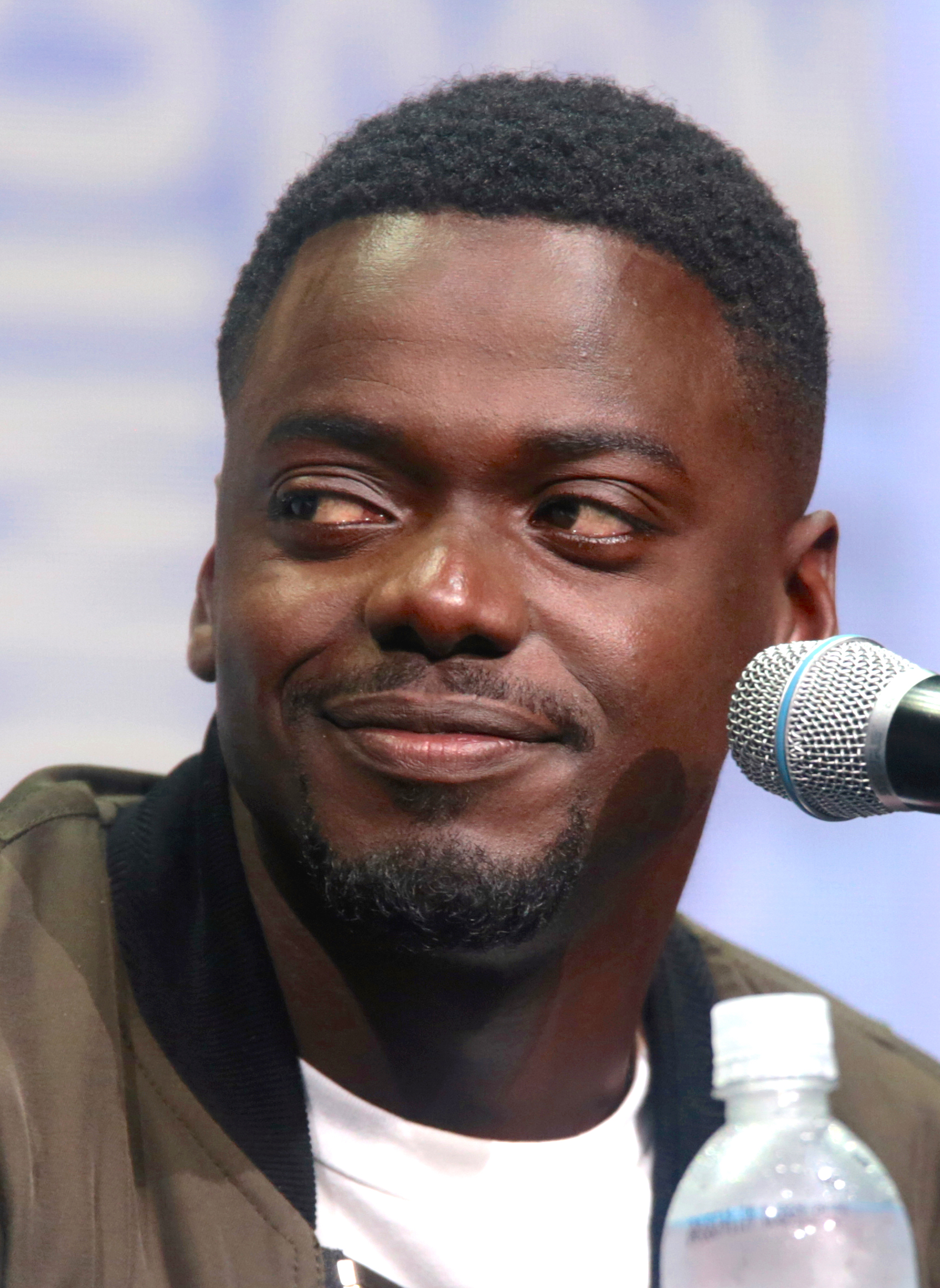
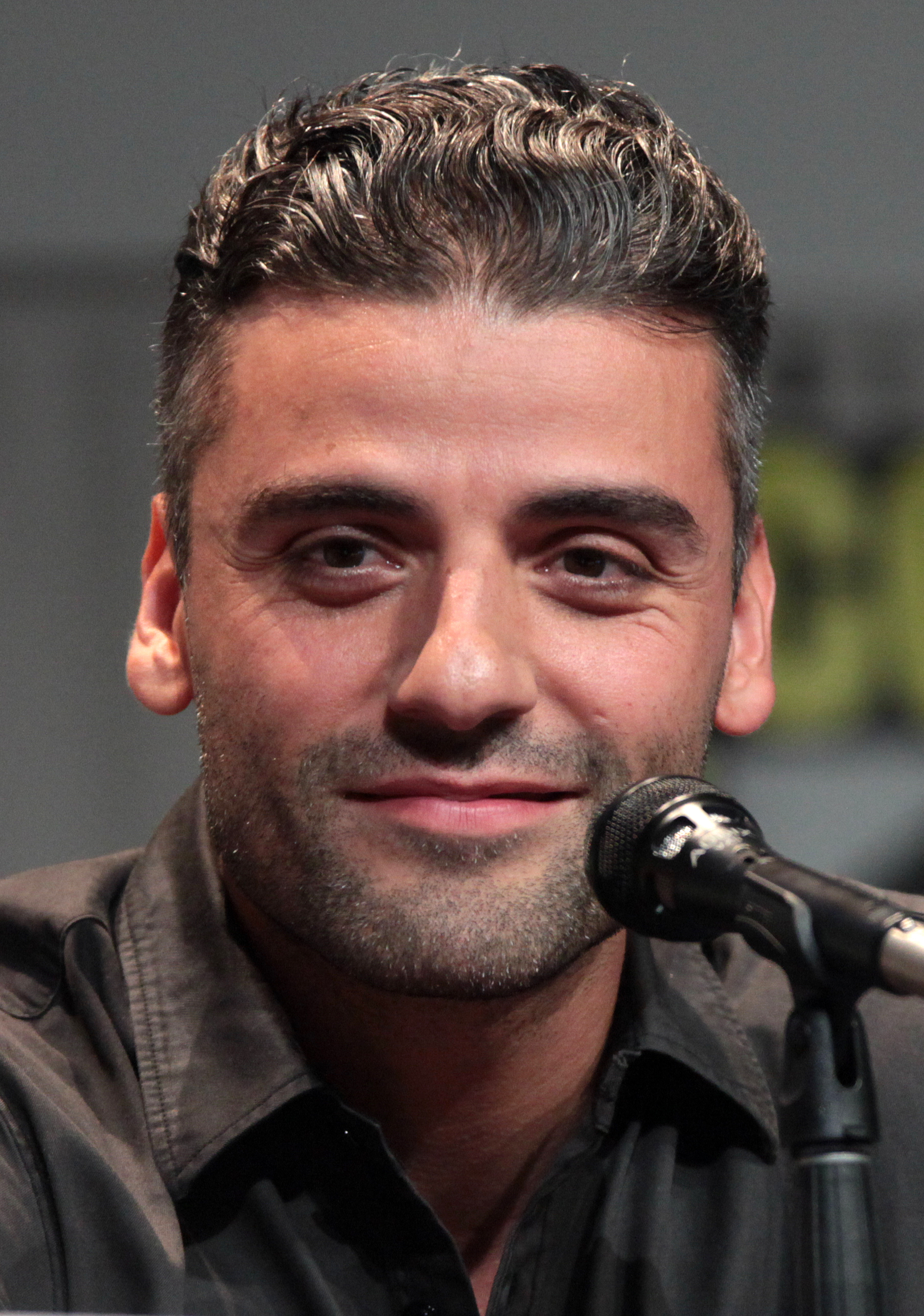
The voice cast of Across the Spider-Verse (L–R): Shameik Moore, Hailee Steinfeld, Brian Tyree Henry, Luna Lauren Vélez, Jake Johnson, Jason Schwartzman, Issa Rae, Karan Soni, Daniel Kaluuya, and Oscar Isaac

Lord and Miller expressed interest in including Spider-Punk, Takuya Yamashiro, the "Japanese Spider-Man" from the 1978 Spider-Man series, and Italian Spiderman in the following movies. In November 2019, Lord indicated that the character Takuya Yamashiro was designed, though he didn't make an appearance in the movie. In August 2020, Jake Johnson expressed hope that he could reprise his role as Peter B. Parker from the first film in the sequel. Issa Rae was cast as Jess Drew / Spider-Woman in June 2021, Johnson confirmed that he would be returning for the sequel a month later, and Oscar Isaac was confirmed in December to be reprising his role of Miguel O'Hara / Spider-Man 2099 from the post-credits scene of Into the Spider-Verse. Also in December, Tom Holland—who plays Peter Parker / Spider-Man in the Marvel Cinematic Universe—revealed that Pascal had approached him about appearing in the Spider-Verse films during the filming of Spider-Man: No Way Home (2021). Holland and his co-stars Zendaya and Jacob Batalon all expressed interest in appearing in the upcoming films. Jeff Sneider of The Ankler reported in February 2023 that Holland was set to appear in a live-action sequence and that this had caused the film's delay from 2022 to 2023; Holland ultimately did not appear. Christopher Daniel Barnes, who voiced Spider-Man in Spider-Man: The Animated Series (1994–1998), also expressed interest in returning for the film.

In April 2022, Brian Tyree Henry and Luna Lauren Vélez were confirmed to be reprising their roles as Miles' parents from the first film while Rachel Dratch was revealed to be voicing the counselor at Miles' school. Lord, Miller, and the directors announced in June that Jason Schwartzman would provide the voice of the film's main antagonist Johnathon Ohnn / the Spot, which was added to the story after a suggestion from producer Avi Arad (a second antagonist was later written out of the movie). Powers noted that the Spot was one of "the deepest cuts in Spider-Man's rogue gallery" but the creative team was excited about his abilities, which allow the character to travel between universes. Shea Whigham and Jorma Taccone were also revealed to be voicing George Stacy and Adriano Tumino / Vulture, respectively. Taccone previously voiced Norman Osborn / Green Goblin and Peter Parker / Spider-Man from the 1967 TV series in Into the Spider-Verse. In November 2022, Daniel Kaluuya was confirmed to be voicing Hobart "Hobie" Brown / Spider-Punk in the film. In December 2022, with the reveal of the film's first poster, it was confirmed that the Peter Parker / Spider-Man from The Spectacular Spider-Man (2008–2009) would appear in the film. Spectacular showrunner Greg Weisman was not informed about the inclusion of his show's character and expressed doubts he would even be featured in the film itself. The film's first trailer also confirmed that the Peter Parker / Spider-Man from Spider-Man Unlimited (1999–2001) would be appearing in the film. In January 2023, Nicolas Cage confirmed he would not be reprising his role of Spider-Man Noir for the film. In February 2023, it was revealed that Karan Soni was cast as Pavitr Prabhakar / Spider-Man India in the film. In April 2023, it was reported that Andy Samberg was playing Ben Reilly / Scarlet Spider. A report confirmed his casting in May 2023, when it was also confirmed that Amandla Stenberg would play Margo Kess / Spider-Byte.

Delilah, a skilled assassin who serves as the bartender at the Bar with No Name in an alternate universe, was meant to make an appearance in the film, but her scene was cut. She would later be included in the Insomniac Games's Marvel's Spider-Man video game series entry Spider-Man 2 (2023), whose version of Peter Parker / Spider-Man also appears in Across the Spider-Verse, with Yuri Lowenthal reprising his role from that series.

=== Animation and design ===
The main universes visited during the film, designed to look like they were each drawn by a different artist

The film was animated by Sony Pictures Imageworks in Vancouver, with Michael Lasker serving as visual effects supervisor. Lord revealed that design work for new characters in the film had begun by November 2019, with comic book artist Kris Anka later revealing that he was serving as a character designer on the film. On June 9, 2020, the film's lead animator Nick Kondo announced that production had started. The different universes visited in the film were designed to look like they were each drawn by a different artist. Having learned new animation tools after working on The Mitchells vs. the Machines (2021) following the first Spider-Verse film, Lord and Miller ambitiously employed them to develop six different animation styles. The intent was to amaze the audience whenever the characters cross into a new environment so the film can accurately reflect its plot and the styles can generate various emotional backdrops. Earth-65, the home of Gwen Stacy, was designed to look like "impressionistic" watercolor paintings. The animation team created a simulator to generate this style and used a visual palette that reflects Gwen's emotions like a "three dimensional mood ring". According to co-director Justin K. Thompson, the reflection of her emotions through colors is inspired by a scene in 1950's Cinderella where her dress gets torn, and the environment reacts to that trauma. This style was also intended by Miller to remind the audience about the covers of the Spider-Gwen comic books.

One of the two alternate Earths seen in the trailer was Earth-50101, which the crew nicknamed "Mumbattan" after Mumbai and Manhattan, due to that world being based on the one from Gotham Entertainment Group's Spider-Man: India comic book series. The other universe was Nueva York, the futuristic New York City from the Marvel 2099 world, was heavily influenced by Syd Mead's neo-futurist illustrations, which has an unfinished look. Also the works of artists Ron Cobb, John Bell, John Berkey, John Harris and Ralph McQuarrie were inspirations for the city's design, in addition to the architecture of Oscar Niemeyer. The city was created as a highly controlled environment reflecting Miguel O'Hara's personality, and has an authoritarian, brutalist and minimalist style of design meant to represent a "clean, strong, unified, front-facing ideology". But when going underground one realizes that it's a world that can't really be controlled.

While the cast and crew were being interviewed for Empire in March 2023, codirector Joaquim Dos Santos revealed that another alternate universe would be "the punky New London, inhabited by Daniel Kaluuya's Spider-Punk", with a final dimension "being kept tightly under wraps for now", later revealed to be Earth-42, the world the spider that bit Miles came from and where he has become that world's version of the Prowler. Spider-Punk's animation style took two to three years to develop and is inspired by collage imagery of 1970s punk-rock album covers, posters, and zines emulating the look of Xerox prints, colored papers and images appropriated from magazines and newsprints, and has a general grayed-out quality due to copy machines not having toner in them. Also the animators experimented with different frame rates to reflect DIY punk visuals and Spider-Punk's anarchic personality and tendency of inconsistency. His body is animated on 3s or 2s (8 or 12 images), his guitar on 4s (6 images), and his outline on 2s or 1s (12 or 24 images); unlike rest of the characters that are predominantly animated on 2s. In May 2023, Jake Johnson revealed in an interview that a Lego universe would be featured in the film. The Lego sequence was done by 14-year-old Canadian animator Preston Mutanga and was added late in the movie, after the filmmakers were so impressed by his fan-made Lego recreation of the film's first teaser that they tracked him down and recruited him.

Miles' design was updated for the sequel to show him having gone through a growth spurt, while Gwen was given a new haircut and an updated costume. Rick Leonardi, the co-creator of Spider-Man 2099, was brought on to adapt his own designs for the film, while comic book artist Brian Stelfreeze was chosen to shape the visual development of Jess Drew, inspired both by the white comic-book Earth-616 Spider-Woman Jessica Drew, the Earth-1610 Ultimate Spider-Woman, and the black live-action television Spider-Woman Valerie the Librarian (portrayed by Hattie Winston in Spidey Super Stories). The Spot's design, which was influenced by Austrian artist Egon Schiele, evolves throughout the film as he gains more confidence and control of his abilities, beginning with a style that looks like an "unfinished sketch [with] blue construction lines that evoke a comic book artist's rough drawing before the work goes to an inker". The Spot's portals were intended to look like "living ink that had spilled or splattered on the comic artist's drawing", which created new challenges for the animation team. The Vulture was given a Renaissance-era design inspired by the artwork of Leonardo da Vinci's workbooks. Thompson also revealed that the design of the spider in the "Go Home Machine" is influenced by the spider in the movie Krull (1983), which is also named "Ynyr" after a character from the film. Gwen Stacy's hair received a redesign in the film, incorporating Gwen Poole's pink hair highlights due to a reference mix-up (as previously independently happened in the development of Marvel Rising). This was credited by Across the Spider-Verse production designer Patrick O'Keefe to artist Peter Chan in January 2024 as having been based on Gurihiru's work on The Unbelievable Gwenpool : Beyond the Fourth Wall, with the design of Gwen Stacy's bedroom also taking influence from the color palette of Gwenpool's hospital gown. Margo Kess / Spider-Byte took the longest time to design and animate, due to the animators intensely studying late 1980s to mid-1990s hologram technology as reference for the design and movements of the character. Miguel O'Hara's suit was designed to resemble video screening and was given a "laser cape" which fluctuates in visibility. This was done to convey he is from a futuristic dimension.

=== Post-production ===
In May 2023, Powers revealed that the film would end on a cliffhanger and co-director Dos Santos compared it to the Star Wars original trilogy film The Empire Strikes Back (1980). Powers explained:

Across the Spider-Verse is a movie on its own, but it definitely ends on a bit of a cliffhanger. I think it's a good cliffhanger. We hope that it's a satisfying tee-up for what's coming in the third film, because you want people to be excited about what's coming next. And it helps that we knew going in that this was part two of a three-part story. Since you already know that that third story is guaranteed, you can tackle it a bit differently. That being said, there's a lot of key characters in this film, and there's a story in this film that has an arc of its own that we needed to complete.

In the same month, Powers also stated that the film would not be "tied" to the Marvel Cinematic Universe (MCU). In the film, Miguel makes a direct reference to the events of Spider-Man: No Way Home (2021), telling Gwen to not "get [him] started on Doctor Strange and that little nerd back on Earth-199999" — referring to the Doctor Strange and Spider-Man of the MCU – while attributing the events of No Way Home to the collider explosion from Into the Spider-Verse. The quote is meant as a throwaway line that Lord and Miller came up with. Additionally, Donald Glover reprises his role as an alternate version of Aaron Davis / Prowler from the MCU film Spider-Man: Homecoming (2017) in a live-action cameo, depicted as a prisoner of the Spider-Society displaced from his home reality. Production on Across the Spider-Verse was completed on May 20, 2023, 13 days before the US release date. With a runtime of 140 minutes, it is the longest animated film ever produced by an American studio, surpassing Consuming Spirits (2012).

==== Allegations of poor working conditions ====
On June 23, 2023, Vulture reported that four people who worked on the film alleged that production had faced difficulties due to numerous requests from Lord for changes to already finished animation, as well as the need for him to approve animation layouts early in production. Lord's directions were said to take precedence over the decisions of the film's directing team and led to numerous weeks of long overtime as the animators drastically revised portions of the film several times. They further stated that difficult working conditions caused by the constant revisions caused over 100 artists to leave the project before its completion, and that both Into the Spider-Verse and The Mitchells vs. the Machines (two earlier films that Lord and Miller co-produced for Sony) suffered from similar production issues. One artist said that production on Beyond the Spider-Verse, the film's sequel, had not progressed, and that there was "no way that" it would be completed in time for its scheduled March 2024 release window. Sony denied the allegations concerning Across the Spider-Verse's production troubles, while declining to comment on the possibility of the sequel being delayed, and producer Amy Pascal called the process of heavy revision normal. Following the 2023 Writers Guild of America strike, Beyond the Spider-Verse was delayed to June 25, 2027, and then ultimately moved up to June 18, 2027.

== Music ==
Daniel Pemberton confirmed in December 2020 that he would return to compose the sequel's score. In December 2022, Lord and Miller confirmed that Metro Boomin would create music for its soundtrack. Several artists were featured on it, including 21 Savage, Swae Lee, Lil Wayne, Future, Nas, ASAP Rocky, Lil Uzi Vert, Wizkid, Coi Leray, Offset, Becky G, Shenseea, A Boogie wit da Hoodie, JID, Don Toliver, James Blake, and 2 Chainz. For the Japanese release, an original song, "Realize" performed by Lisa, was featured. The film was supported by another single, "Mona Lisa" by Dominic Fike, released on June 2, 2023—the day of the film's premiere. Although originally set to be released as a track on the deluxe edition of the soundtrack album, a few days after its release, the track was removed. On June 23, 2023, it was announced that the track was added into some versions of Fike's second studio album Sunburn, which was released on July 7, 2023.

Though external to the film's score and soundtrack, Daniel Kaluuya also incorporated musical elements into his vocal performance as Spider-Punk / Hobie Brown. Kaluuya elaborated that he searched for the word "Spider-Punk" on Spotify, hoping to find fan-made playlists. He stated that after finding some he "would just listen to them, be like vibing out," helping him with the process of gauging the character's energy. Kaluuya further noted that "he wanted the character's voice to feel like a song," and that a take in which he portrayed the character as "rapping, but in a punk style" would be the one used in the film.

== Marketing ==
In May 2020, Sony entered into a promotional partnership with Hyundai Motor Company to showcase their new models and technologies in the film. A prologue for the film was released at Comic Con Experience in December 2021, revealing the title and the fact that the film is a two-part sequel. Following the announcement of the new title and release date in April 2022, Lord and Miller showed 15 minutes of the film (with unfinished animation) at Sony's CinemaCon panel. Lord, Miller, and the directors showed the same footage at the Annecy International Animation Film Festival in June, with updated animation and effects. In February 2023, Funko Pops figures based on characters from the film were revealed. In April 2023, another 14-minute footage was previewed at Sony's CinemaCon panel. A second trailer was released on April 4. It gained 148.6M views within 24 hours, becoming the most-viewed second trailer for a Marvel film within that timespan and also the most-viewed superhero film trailer of the summer. Rolling Stone's Larisha Paul remarked that Miles wanted the other heroes to accept and validate him but also wanted to create his own story and not be controlled by them. Christian Holub of Entertainment Weekly felt the Spider-People were more antagonistic and that Miles' family was in more danger than in the first film. Meanwhile, Abid Rahman from The Hollywood Reporter compared Miles' introduction to the Spider-People in the trailer to the "vibe" of Citadel of Ricks and highlighted the reference to the Spider-Man pointing meme. Commentators also noted that the trailer posited that Miles could potentially have to choose between saving the multiverse or his family.

On May 15, 2023; the film started the sale of different Spider-Verse themed food items for their collaboration with Burger King. The items available during the promotion included the Spider-Verse Whopper with a red bun and the Spider-Verse Sundae. On May 20, 2023, Nike released a special iteration of the Air Jordan 1 High OG inspired by the film. On May 23, 2023, Epic Games added skins of Miles Morales and Spider-Man 2099 to Fortnite based on their designs in the film. The electronics manufacturer ZOTAC also partnered with Sony Pictures to create limited-edition Spider-Man-themed RTX 4070 graphics cards.

== Themes ==
Spider-Man: Across the Spider-Verse tackles trauma and the necessity for heroes to suffer for the greater good. This is represented through Miguel's enforced theory on the canon. The Spider Society believes that certain "canon events" are necessary to maintain the stability of the Spider-Verse, and any interference such as saving the life of someone who is "destined" to die can result in the destruction of their dimension. Miles stands in opposition to this, while Miguel reinforces the canon, leading to the two heroes clashing over ideals. According to Shameik Moore, Miguel is not a villain but is "just not on the same side of the fence as Miles", following a different "moral compass" that causes friction between them. He also claimed that Across emphasizes the necessity of multiple sides to resolve conflict rather than one, and that "power lies in unity".

Individuality and choices in Across are often challenged by determinism. Miles struggles with maintaining his free will against other characters, who try to decide what's best for him. In particular, the Spider Society dubs him an "anomaly" and interdimensional error, due to the Spider that bit him coming from a different dimension. Despite this, Miles chooses his individuality against a corrupted system and pursues finding a way to save his father. Conversely, Gwen struggles to balance her responsibilities at the Spider-Verse Society and her bond with Miles. She reconnects with him and continues to be close to him, despite the knowledge of his status as the "original anomaly" and being forbidden by the Spider Society to see him due to his existence contradicting the rule of canon events. In addition to this, Gwen is forced by Miguel and Jess to follow a doctrine she does not agree with, as they threaten to banish her back to her dimension to be apprehended by her father if she sides with Miles. Eventually, she is exiled from the Spider Society for defending Miles and succumbs to the possibility of her arrest. However, George chooses his love for his daughter over pursuing her further, saving himself from his canon event while maintaining the stability of their dimension. This encourages Gwen to reform the Spider Gang to support Miles against the corrupted Spider Society which enforces predetermined fate.

The importance of support and connections between people is shown throughout Across. Miles seeks to join the society and reconnect with Gwen, while also struggling to remain close to his family. Phil Lord has stated that Miles, throughout the film, is trying to be his own person while not losing where he came. Likewise, Gwen seeks to reconnect with Miles and visits him during an assigned mission. Director Justin K. Thompson has referred to Miles and Gwen as seeing each other as "the only one person in any dimension that can understand them [Miles and Gwen]" and that they "parallel each other so much that they wind up relating to each other". Furthermore, Miles and Gwen's strong bond is alluded to when Gwen's Spider-Sense alerts her that the former is trapped in another dimension. Moore has stated that Miles is "in a place where he just wants to impress her [Gwen]" and would "jump through a portal across dimensions to be with her". After Gwen is threatened with being arrested by her father, Jess takes her in as a pupil and becomes a mother figure to her. She is also supported by Hobie who allows her to seek refuge in his dimension and he supports her and Miles throughout Across. However, while her relationship with Jess eventually fades, her friendship with Hobie stays strong as he remains loyal to her and Miles throughout the film.

According to Daniel Kaluuya, Hobie stands for resistance against a corrupt system. This is shown through how he looks out for Gwen, observing that she is part of an institution that she does not align with but is forced to be a part of. Additionally, Hobie is shown to observe that "even though there is community that is seemingly heroes empowering people, they can still form an establishment that eradicates the individual". He also supports Miles throughout the film, due to Miles' drive to unravel the corrupt system and status quo of the Spider Society.

The creators wanted to reinforce the previous film's message that "anyone can wear the mask". The concept of "canon events" was developed as a meta-commentary on ideas of "canon, and rules and who gets to be [Spider-Man]". Additionally, Miles Morales's isolation and conflict with the Spider Society was based on the negative fan response to the character during his early appearances in Marvel Comics as Spider-Man. Justin Thompson claimed that the filmmakers wanted to tackle this, stating that "the entire world should be represented in that character [Spider-Man]."

== Release ==
=== Theatrical ===
Spider-Man: Across the Spider-Verse premiered on May 30, 2023, at the Grand Rex in Paris, France, and at the Regency Village Theater in Los Angeles, and was theatrically released in the United States on June 2, in premium large formats and IMAX. Unlike the first film, this film was not released in 3D. It was originally set for release on April 8, 2022, but was shifted to October 7 due to the COVID-19 pandemic. It was then moved to the June 2023 date. The film was re-released in IMAX in limited theaters on January 19, 2024, which marked the debut of a new Columbia Pictures logo that commemorates the studio's 100th anniversary. In China, the film premiered in Beijing on May 31 and was released on June 2.

On June 9, 2023, in response to complaints of sound mixing issues from viewers in some theaters, Sony sent an updated version of the film with new audio mixing to theaters. An official source told Variety that, while the issues were only present at a "handful of theaters", all prints of the film had been updated and re-sent to cinemas. It was reported that at least two versions of the film—distinct in slight differences in dialogue and animations—exist in theaters. For example, in one version, a scene between Miguel and Lyla ends with Lyla giving a fist bump, while another ends in Lyla taking a selfie of them. The film's associate editor, Andy Leviton, confirmed the reports.

==== Transgender iconography and censorship ====
A screenshot from the film, showing Gwen Stacy in her room with a "Protect Trans Kids" transgender flag on the right, above the doorframe

The film's release initially was delayed in the MENA region until June 22, 2023, but later withdrawn from cinemas across the region because the film briefly features transgender iconography, such as a transgender flag on a banner seen hanging in Gwen Stacy's bedroom with the words "Protect Trans Kids". The flag's appearance led to speculation that Gwen supports her universe's transgender rights movement and led to interpretations of Gwen's story being a transgender allegory, with some interpreting Gwen herself as being transgender. Although she is not identified as transgender in the film, viewers and critics who supported this interpretation additionally pointed to the use of the flag's colors (light pink, light blue, and white) elsewhere in scenes involving Gwen and her universe, and the perceived parallels to coming out in her character arc within the film. However, others have noted that the pink, blue and white colors were already used by the comics' version of Spider-Woman Gwen Stacy, and thus were not necessarily proof that the film version of the character is trans.

=== Home media ===
Spider-Man: Across the Spider-Verse was released on digital download by Sony Pictures Home Entertainment on August 8, 2023, and on Ultra HD Blu-ray, Blu-ray, and DVD on September 5. The digital release of the film featured additional alterations from the initial theatrical cut, such as the removal of several lines of dialogue. This version, which was also available in some theaters, was described by Miller as "an international version" of the film created to help with the necessary translations needed and to be approved by the French censorship board. He added that the animators "cleaned up and tweaked" some of the shots that had already been submitted for the finished version, with other members of the team, such as in the sound department, also suggesting alternate ideas, stating, "Because it's a multiverse movie, it's like there's a multiverse of the movie – that was really the reasoning behind it. It was trying to make the best possible version that everyone was going to be the proudest of." Lord believed some of these changes created an improved film. Some of the alterations have been controversial with the film's fanbase.

In April 2021, Sony signed deals with Netflix and Disney for the rights to their 2022 to 2026 film slate, following the films' theatrical and home media windows. Netflix signed for exclusive "pay 1 window" streaming rights, which is typically an 18-month window and included the sequels to Spider-Man: Into the Spider-Verse; this deal built on an existing output deal that Netflix had signed with Sony Pictures Animation in 2014. Disney signed for "pay 2 window" rights for the films, which would be streamed on Disney+ and Hulu as well as broadcast on Disney's linear television networks. Spider-Man: Across the Spider-Verse was released on Netflix in the United States on October 31, 2023, and was released on Disney+ on May 1, 2025.

== Reception ==
=== Box office ===
Spider-Man: Across the Spider-Verse grossed $381.6 million in the United States and Canada, and $309.2 million in other territories, for a worldwide gross of $690.8 million. The film surpassed Into the Spider-Verse's total gross of $384.5 million after 12 days of release, and overtook The Smurfs to become Sony Pictures Animation's highest-grossing film. Deadline Hollywood calculated the net profit of the film to be $328 million, when factoring together all expenses and revenues placed it third on their list of 2023's "Most Valuable Blockbusters".

In the United States and Canada, Across the Spider-Verse was released alongside The Boogeyman, and was initially projected to gross around $80 million from 4,313 theaters in its opening weekend, with rival studios predicting it could reach $90 million. It made $17.35 million from Thursday night previews, the third-best total for an animated film after The Lion King ($23 million in 2019) and Incredibles 2 ($18.5 million in 2018). After making $51.7 million on Friday (including previews, the best first-day of 2023 up to that point), weekend estimates were increased to $113 million. It went on to debut to $120.7 million, the second-highest opening weekend total of 2023 (behind The Super Mario Bros. Movie's $146.4 million) and the eighth-best ever for an animated film. It also surpassed Hotel Transylvania 2 ($48.4 million in 2015) to achieve the highest opening weekend for a Sony Pictures Animation film. The film made $55.5 million in its second weekend, finishing second behind newcomer Transformers: Rise of the Beasts. It then made $27.8 million in its third weekend, finishing third. The film would make $19.3 million on its fourth weekend, topping the box office once again amidst competition from No Hard Feelings, a new release, and The Flash and Elemental, both holdovers.

Outside the US and Canada, the film grossed $88.1 million from 59 markets in its opening weekend. In its second weekend, Across the Spider-Verse grossed $47 million, for a drop of 44%, while in its third weekend, it grossed $27.6 million from 60 markets, including Japan where the film made $2.8 million. As of July 9, 2023, the highest grossing territories were China ($49.6 million), UK ($35 million), Mexico ($27.8 million), Australia ($20.6 million) and France ($13.4 million).

=== Critical response ===
On the review aggregator website Rotten Tomatoes, 95% of 386 critics' reviews are positive, with an average rating of 8.6/10. The website's consensus reads: "Just as visually dazzling and action-packed as its predecessor, Spider-Man: Across the Spider-Verse thrills from start to cliffhanger conclusion." Metacritic, which uses a weighted average, assigned the film a score of 86 out of 100, based on 60 critics, indicating "universal acclaim". Audiences surveyed by CinemaScore gave the film an average grade of A on an A+ to F scale, while those polled at PostTrak gave it a 93% overall positive score, with 82% saying they would "definitely recommend" it.

Brian Tallerico of RogerEbert.com gave the film 4 out of 4 stars, writing, "Like the work of a young artist who refuses to be restrained by the borders of the frame, Across the Spider-Verse is loaded with incredible imagery and fascinating ideas. It is a smart, thrilling piece of work that reminded me of other great part twos like The Dark Knight and The Empire Strikes Back." Ann Hornaday of The Washington Post gave the film 3/4 stars, calling it "an extravagant, very cool love letter to graphic design, executed with superb draftsmanship and giddy, infectious joy". Richard Roeper of the Chicago Sun-Times also gave it 3 out of 4 stars, writing, "It's a bit too much at times, but it's also pretty great, and it'll be a huge surprise if the third chapter in the trilogy isn't equally entertaining." Kevin Maher of The Times gave the film 4 out of 5 stars, writing, "It rarely draws breath between set pieces, and creates distinct and spectacular environments for each separate spider-verse."

David Fear of Rolling Stone said that the film "completely recaptures the panel-to-panel thrill of discovering your respective era's teen-angsty Marvel icon. The thrill of the multiversal new is gone. Everything else, however, is extra-webbed for your pleasure." Alison Willmore of Vulture wrote, "Across the Spider-Verse looks incredible, even better than the groundbreaking first installment, but what's truly impressive about it is how willing it is to entrust its storytelling to its animation." The Atlantic's David Sims wrote that the film "avoids seeming like a physics lesson because its visuals are consistently thrilling; the most static bits of dialogue still pop because of how daring the animation is." Kyle Smith of The Wall Street Journal described the film as being "visually hypercaffeinated" but with a slow plot in the first half of the film, plotlines being a "hectic series of clashes", action sequences that were "jumpy but not especially engaging", and "too many long monologues". Jake Wilson of The Age gave the film 3 out of 5 stars, writing, "Typically for Lord and Miller, the upshot is both adventurous and conformist, an outwardly bold reimagining of the material that never stops congratulating us for our brand loyalty, and which plays it safer in plot terms than the early sequences might lead you to hope."

=== Accolades ===
At the 96th Academy Awards, Spider-Man: Across the Spider-Verse received a nomination for Best Animated Feature. Its other nominations include seven Annie Awards (winning all, a clean sweep), two British Academy Film Awards, three Critics' Choice Movie Awards (winning one), and three Golden Globe Awards. The American Film Institute named Spider-Man: Across the Spider-Verse one of the ten-best films of 2023. It also won the National Board of Review Award for Best Animated Film. IndieWire listed Spider-Man: Across the Spider-Verse as the second greatest animated film of the 21st century.

=== Other responses ===
Filmmaker Guillermo del Toro, who won the Academy Award for Best Animated Feature for his 2022 adaptation of Pinocchio, praised the film, saying "Spider-Verse will fulfill and heal." During a London Q&A screening, Andrew Garfield, who portrayed Peter Parker in The Amazing Spider-Man films, called the film "a masterpiece of pure cinema". Bryce Dallas Howard, who played Gwen Stacy in Spider-Man 3 (2007), expressed her and her father, Ron Howard's, love for the movie, calling it "an astonishing film on every level". The filmmakers behind Kung Fu Panda 4 cited the Spider-Verse films as inspiration for their fight scenes, incorporating an "inkbrush" style.

An Internet meme involving the notion of canon events began spreading on TikTok after the film's release, which later became a trend. The meme's word "canon" elaborated its special definition as "ironic (if not actually painful)" experiences in real life. Collins Dictionary selected "canon event" as one of its ten contenders for Word of the year in 2023, defining the term as "an event that is essential to the formation of an individual's character or identity".

== Future ==
=== Sequel ===
A third and final film in the Spider-Verse trilogy, Spider-Man: Beyond the Spider-Verse, is scheduled for release on June 18, 2027, with Bob Persichetti and Justin K. Thompson returning as directors along with Lord, Miller, and Dave Callaham returning as screenwriters. Moore, Steinfeld, Schwartzman, Soni, Kaluuya, and Jerome reprise their roles.

=== Spin-offs ===
Sony began developing a Spider-Women film in November 2018 that would focus on three generations of female, Spider-related characters. Bek Smith was writing the spin-off, and Lauren Montgomery was in talks to direct. Pascal said the film would focus on the characters Gwen Stacy / Spider-Gwen, Cindy Moon / Silk, and Jess Drew / Spider-Woman, and said Across the Spider-Verse would serve as a "launching pad" for it. Lord and Miller were confirmed to be producing the film in April 2021, when the project was undergoing rewrites. Pascal and Arad reaffirmed that the film was in development in May 2023, when Arad said it would be made sooner than expected, while Steinfeld expressed interest in the film.

In August 2025, a spin-off film centered on Spider-Punk was revealed to be in early development, with Kaluuya co-writing the script with Ajon Singh and expected to reprise his role. Furthermore, in December 2025, Kaluuya confirmed that the spin-off is in its final stages of writing.

In February 2026, Sony Pictures Animation presidents Kristine Belson and Damien de Froberville reconfirmed the development of the Spider-Woman and Spider-Punk films was ongoing, projecting they will be released after Beyond the Spider-Verse.

=== Manga spin-off ===
On May 29, 2023, it was announced that a manga spin-off titled Spider-Man: Octopus Girl written by Hideyuki Furuhashi and illustrated by Betten Court would begin serialization on June 20 on Shueisha's Shōnen Jump+ website and app. The story revolves around Doctor Octopus, who falls into a coma and has been reawakened in the body of young Japanese middle schooler named Otoha Okutamiya. In February 2024, Viz Media announced that they licensed the series for English publication in the fourth quarter of 2024 under the title Spider-Man: Octo-Girl. The series initially ended its serialization on January 7, 2025, before returning on December 4, 2025.
