= Preston Mutanga =

Canadian animator (born 2008)

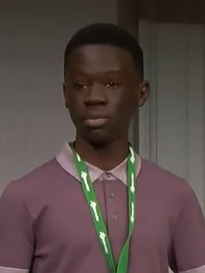
- Mutanga at Blender Conference 2023
- Born: October 8, 2008 (age 17); Minnesota, US
- Occupation: Animator
- Notable work: Spider-Man: Across the Spider-Verse

Preston Mutanga (born October 8, 2008) is a Cameroonian, American, and Canadian animator known for creating 3D animations based on Lego toys. He gained popularity as a young teenager for recreating film trailers, several of which became viral videos. When he was fourteen years old, one of his videos impressed Phil Lord and Christopher Miller, prompting them to hire him to animate a scene for the 2023 film Spider-Man: Across the Spider-Verse.

== Biography ==
Mutanga was born in the US state of Minnesota to two immigrants from the Northwest Region of Cameroon, and he lives in Toronto, Canada. When he was young, his father introduced him to the 3D modeling software Blender, and Preston used YouTube videos to teach himself how to use it for animation. He made his first animated video when he was around nine years old. He was inspired by Pixar films.

After viewing stop-motion Lego videos on YouTube, he decided to try to do something similar with Blender and recreated the film trailer for Spider-Man: Into the Spider-Verse when he was fourteen years old. He studied Lego toys under different lighting conditions to make the 3D animation look realistic. He posted the video on Twitter, and it was seen by Lord and Miller. They were inspired by Mutanga's video, and producer Christina Steinberg contacted him to ask him to work with them on the sequel film Spider-Man: Across the Spider-Verse. Mutanga and his parents initially believed the message to be a scam but realized that it was a real offer after contacting the film's production designer Patrick O'Keefe. His father then built a new computer for him so that he could render his animations more efficiently. He worked on a scene for the film remotely from his home in Toronto with regular feedback from Christopher Miller. The animation took him three months, with much of it being done during his March break from school.

After working on Across the Spider-Verse, he continued to create Lego-styled film trailers, including for the films Deadpool & Wolverine and KPop Demon Hunters. Mutanga has stated that he hopes to work professionally as a director and animator in film and television.
