= The Hope Division (film) =

- Genre: Crime; Drama; Mystery
- Written by: Patricia Green
- Directed by: Mel Damski
- Starring: Dorian Harewood; Mimi Kuzyk; Hattie Winston
- Theme music composer: John E. Davis
- Country of origin: United States
- Original language: English

Production
- Executive producers: Aaron Spelling; Douglas S. Cramer
- Producers: David Abramowitz; Mel Damski; Garner Simmons; E. Duke Vincent
- Cinematography: Jules Brenner
- Editors: Rod Stephens; John Woodcock
- Production company: Aaron Spelling Productions

Original release
- Network: ABC
- Release: August 17, 1987

The Hope Division is a 1987 American television film.

== Premise ==
A black cop teams up with a white cop to track down a serial killer.

== Cast ==
- Dorian Harewood
- Mimi Kuzyk
- Hattie Winston
