= Coming to America (TV pilot) =

1989 American television pilot

- Genre: Sitcom
- Based on: Coming to America by: Barry W. Blaustein; David Sheffield; Eddie Murphy
- Written by: Ken Hecht
- Directed by: Tony Singletary
- Starring: Tommy Davidson; Paul Bates; John Hancock; Hattie Winston; Paris Vaughan; A. J. Johnson; C. Darnell Rose; Francis MacGuire
- Composer: John Beasley
- Country of origin: United States
- Original language: English
- No. of episodes: 1

Production
- Executive producers: Ken Hecht; Eddie Murphy
- Editor: John Doutt
- Camera setup: Multi-camera
- Running time: 24 minutes
- Production companies: Eddie Murphy Television; Paramount Television

Original release
- Network: CBS
- Release: July 4, 1989

Related
- CBS Summer Playhouse

Coming to America is the name of a proposed weekly sitcom, based on the 1988 film of the same name. The pilot ultimately went unsold, but it was still televised on CBS on July 4, 1989, as part of the CBS Summer Playhouse pilot anthology series.

== Plot ==
Irresponsible Prince Tariq of Zamunda has been exiled to attend college in America by the king, his brother Akeem. It however, takes only nine days living in Queens, New York for Tariq to blow his allowance. So in order to make ends meet, Tariq and his best friend/personal assistant Oha, find jobs in the diner owned by their landlord, Carl Mackey.

At one point in the pilot, Tariq says in reference to Eddie Murphy, “I'm a Beverly Hills Cop, you're a Beverly Hills cop too and in 48 hours, we're Trading Places.” Also, Tariq at another point, shows up at the diner with a copy of The Art of the Deal, which he explains that someone threw at him. Tariq believes he's "just like this homosexual guy," and that he'll get rich by buying and selling property, despite the fact that he doesn't have any money.

== Cast ==
The pilot starred Tommy Davidson as Prince Tariq, Paul Bates reprising his role as Oha (though he's named Omar in the pilot) from the film, and John Hancock as their landlord, Carl Mackey. Also among the cast are Hattie Winston and Paris Vaughan as Carl's wife and daughter respectively.

- Tommy Davidson as Prince Tariq
- Paul Bates as Oha
- John Hancock as Carl Mackey
- Hattie Winston as Pauline Mackey
- Paris Vaughan as Phyliss Mackey
- A. J. Johnson as Annie
- C. Darnell Rose as Steve
- Francis MacGuire as Amy

== Production ==
The show was presented by Eddie Murphy Television in association with Paramount Television, a Gulf+Western Company. Furthermore, Murphy was listed as co-executive producer. The pilot was greenlit as part of a first-look deal with Paramount, Eddie Murphy, and CBS. Had the pilot been successful, then CBS would've proceeded with an initial 13-episode run.

In 2020, Bonsu Thompson of Level wrote about the would be show in his article "An Oral History of the Coming To America Show You Never Knew About". Thompson wrote that the pilot floundered because it was written by a Jewish writer, Ken Hecht, “who had made a name penning Black sitcoms like Diff'rent Strokes and Webster and reportedly took a rigid, I-know-best approach to comedy". Thompson also stated the pilot “didn't take advantage of Tommy Davidson's gifts." But, what Hecht was able to do with family sitcoms like Diff'rent Strokes and Webster "did not rule in 1989--and a suspect fascination with Africans eating insects didn't help," he continued.

According to Tommy Davidson, Ken Hecht came from the golden age of comedy, where he knew about the setup, joke, joke, and another joke but didn't have a feel for Eddie Murphy's style of comedy nor a feel for Black pride. Davidson added that Murphy never visited the set to see the show being filmed. Ultimately, Paramount and CBS, knowing that they had a turkey on their hands, aired it on the Fourth of July, less than a year after it was shot.

== Critical response ==
Joan Hanauer wrote in UPI on July 3, 1989 that the pilot was perfectly awful. She added that if your idea of humor is seeing a fat man's pants split in back when he bends over, then you will find Coming to America screamingly funny.

In 2015, Molly Fitzpatrick of Splinter said that Tommy Davidson's Tariq lacks Eddie Murphy's Akeem's irresistible Pollyannaish charm from the film, and the pilot mostly functions as a disjointed vehicle for Davidson's Stevie Wonder and Michael Jackson impressions.
