= Nativity: A Life Story =

African American Christmas-themed musical

Nativity: A Life Story is an African American Christmas-themed musical based on the Black Nativity written by Langston Hughes, that was intended to become a holiday tradition, appearing annually in various venues in New York City since its inception in the mid-1990s. The performances have been sponsored by the Schomburg Center for Research in Black Culture. Bruce Weber of The New York Times called it "a quirky combination of spiritual fervor, showbiz glamour, African-American pride and a celebration of women".

Created in the mid-1990s, performances were held in a variety of auditoriums in New York City. In 2001, the musical was performed at Riverside Church, where crowds were in excess of the church's capacity of 1,900. Starting in 2002, Nativity found a home at the United Palace Theater, a venue owned by Reverend Ike and the United Christian Evangelistic Association located at 175th Street and Broadway in Washington Heights, Manhattan that provides seating for 3,500 for the three performances presented that year. Howard Dodson announced at the time that the United Palace would be the musical's permanent home. The show was created by Harold Wheeler and Hattie Winston, together with producer James Stovall, who was executive director of the Ministry of the Arts & Culture at the Palace Theater. "Black Nativity", a gospel song-play by Langston Hughes first performed in 1961, was a major inspiration for Nativity. The show's producers planned for the show to become an annual tradition to rival the Christmas show at Radio City Music Hall and A Christmas Carol at the Theater at Madison Square Garden, though Weber in his 2002 review felt it "doesn't yet have the polish of its downtown cousins".

The 2002 production of Nativity featured a cast accompanied by three choirs and a company that totaled 125 performers. Several of the performers had appeared in Nativity in several previous year's productions, with Ebony Jo-Ann and Lillias White having contract clauses written into their agreements to perform elsewhere guaranteeing that they would be allowed to perform in Nativity. White, who performed the spiritual "No Room" said that "This is something I absolutely have to do every year". BeBe Winans, who played Joseph, and Stephanie Mills as Mary did a duet of Joseph Joubert's "Love Is a Miracle". The song "Have You Heard About the Baby" was performed by an a cappella trio led by Freddie Jackson. Composer William L. Dawson's hymn "Behold the Star" was led by Priscilla Baskerville together with the Ebony Ecumenical Ensemble and the Broadway Inspirational Voices. Narration was provided by Denise Burse, Keith David and Phylicia Rashad. The closing number is "Spread the Word", described as "a rollicking gospel chorale" that had "the audience was on its feet and roaring as though a rock concert was ending" serving as "a fitting conclusion to this grandly spirited and wholly contemporary show, whose creators have persevered with a faith of their own".

A 2003 review recognized the "powerful singing voices" and "dance that delivers the goose bumps", but said that "the production values are reminiscent of an elementary-school pageant, rickety scenery and all". Two performances of Nativity were presented in December 2006 at the nightclub Joe's Pub, featuring George Faison and Lillias White.
