= Hattie Winston =

American actress

- Born: March 3, 1945 (age 81); Lexington, Mississippi, U.S.
- Occupation: Actress
- Years active: 1965–present
- Spouse: Harold Wheeler
- Children: 1

Hattie Winston (born March 3, 1945) is an American film, television and Broadway actress. She is known for her roles as Margaret Wyborn on Becker, Lucy Carmichael in Rugrats, The Rugrats Movie, and the spin off series All Grown Up! and as a cast member of the PBS children's series The Electric Company.

== Early life ==
Winston was born in Lexington, Mississippi, on March 3, 1945, the daughter of Roosevelt Winston and Selena (née Thurmond). She was raised in Greenville, Mississippi, where Winston attended local schools, which were segregated at the time. She left the South at the age of 14 and settled in Manhattan, New York, graduating high school there. Winston attended Howard University for two years, where she majored in music.

== Career ==
=== Broadway and stage ===
She began her career on stage in New York City in 1965, and was an original member of the Negro Ensemble Company. By the late 1960s, she had begun acting on Broadway. Winston portrayed Nell in musical The Me Nobody Knows (1970−71) before landing the role of Sylvia in Shakespearean comedy The Two Gentlemen of Verona (1972−73), replacing Jonelle Allen. She had previously served as Allen's understudy in the production. Winston then appeared as Cleo in musical I Love My Wife (1979), with Lawrence Hilton-Jacobs playing her character's husband.

Winston portrayed the lead, Billie Holiday, in play Lady Day (1981). She starred in the Broadway hit The Tap Dance Kid (1983−84) as Ginnie, her latest Broadway production to date. Winston received two Obie Awards for her roles in Mother Courage and Her Children and The Michigan. She co-wrote the musical Nativity: A Life Story alongside James Stovall, which has been performed frequently since its inception.

=== The Electric Company ===
In 1973, Winston joined the cast of PBS children's series The Electric Company during its third season, produced by the Children's Television Workshop. She replaced Lee Chamberlin on the series after Chamberlin’s departure at the end of the show’s second season in 1973. Winston's most notable character was Valerie the Librarian, the girlfriend of Easy Reader (portrayed by Morgan Freeman). She also played many villainess roles versus Spider-Man on the Spidey Super Stories sketches, such as the Fox, the Thumper, the Queen Bee, and the Queen of Diamonds. Winston remained with the show until it ended in 1977.

=== Film and television ===
While appearing on The Electric Company, Winston was Veronique on soap opera The Edge of Night (1976). Winston appeared regularly as nurse Toni Gillette in Nurse from 1981 to 1982. She performed alongside Dorian Harewood in the television film The Hope Division (1987). Winston was Pauline in the unsuccessful pilot Coming to America (1989), based on the film of the same name. In 1990, Winston portrayed Nurse Flowers in Sesame Street Home Video Visits the Hospital.

In 1991, she won the role of housekeeper Gloria Davis in Homefront, and continued playing the character until 1993. For her work on Homefront, Winston was nominated for an NAACP Image Award for Outstanding Actress in a Drama Series in 1994. She recurred on soap opera Port Charles as Alice Morgan, and acted in the Western The Cherokee Kid (1996).

She provided the voice of Lucy Carmichael on the popular Nickelodeon cartoon Rugrats, as well as in the 1998 film version, The Rugrats Movie. Winston reprised the role in the spin-off series All Grown Up!, which ran from 2003 through 2008. During the 2000s, she played Margaret Turk, the mother of Dr. Christopher Turk (Donald Faison), on the NBC (later ABC) sitcom Scrubs.

From 1998 through 2004, she portrayed nurse Margaret Wybourn on the CBS sitcom Becker, starring Ted Danson. John Crook described Winston as a "valuable cog" on Becker. In 2001, Winston received her second NAACP Image Award nomination, in the category of Outstanding Supporting Actress in a Comedy Series as Margaret.

Following her run on Becker, Winston made guest appearances on ER, Cold Case, Castle and Mike & Molly. She had a recurring role as Sister Coriann Pearly in sitcom The Soul Man.

In film, Winston portrayed Mrs. Todd in Beverly Hills Cop III (1994), Simone in Jackie Brown (1997) and Angela Russel in True Crime (1999), the latter opposite Clint Eastwood. Winston had a minor role as a hospital nurse in Living Out Loud (1998).

== Personal life ==
Winston was married to Harold Wheeler, who served as musical director for Dancing with the Stars. The couple has one daughter, Samantha.

== Filmography ==
Film
Year	Title	Role	Notes
1973	Broadway	Herself	Television film
1974	Ann in Blue	Officer Jessie Waters	Television film
1974	Out to Lunch	Herself / Various	Television film
1979	Hollow Image	Ivy	Television film
1980	Nurse	Toni Gillette	Television film
1981	Les uns et les autres	Unknown	
1983	Without a Trace	Reporter	
1986	Good to Go	Mother	
1987	The Hope Division	Lilah Reynolds	Television film
1988	Clara's Heart	Blanche Loudon	
1989	Runaway	Aunt Anna Mae	Television film
1990	A Show of Force	Foster	
1990	Sesame Street Home Video Visits The Hospital	Nurse Flowers	VHS
1994	One Woman's Courage	Unknown	Television film
1994	Beverly Hills Cop III	Mrs. Todd	
1996	Sunset Park	Judge Meyer	
1996	The Cherokee Kid	Mrs. Elizabeth Peel	Television film
1997	Jackie Brown	Simone Hawkins	
1998	Living Out Loud	Hospital Nurse	
1998	The Rugrats Movie	Dr. Lucy Carmichael	Voice
1998	Meet the Deedles	Jo-Claire	
1999	True Crime	Angela Russel	
1999	Unbowed	Mother	
1999	After All	Mother of Defendant	Television film
2003	The Battle of Shaker Heights	Principal Holmstead	

Television
Year	Title	Role	Notes
1973-1977	The Electric Company	Sylvia / Valerie The Librarian	520 episodes
1976	The Edge of Night	Veronique	
1980	3-2-1 Contact	Jessica	2 episodes
1981-1982	Nurse	Toni Gillette	25 episodes
1987	Ryan's Hope	Carol Bruce	1 episode
1989	CBS Summer Playhouse	Pauline Mackey	1 episode
1991-1993	Homefront	Gloria Davis	42 episodes
1994	The Little Mermaid	Mommy Crab	Voice, 1 episode
1995	Step by Step	Saleslady	1 episode
1996	Nick Freno: Licensed Teacher	Irene	1 episode
1997	Duckman	voice	1 episode
1997	The Parent 'Hood	Ms. Washington	1 episode
1997	Malcolm & Eddie	Mrs. Brooks	1 episode
1997	Arsenio	Mom	1 episode
1997-1998	Port Charles	Alice Morgan	19 episodes
1998	Smart Guy	Felicia Vanowen	1 episode
1998-2003	Becker	Margaret Wyborn	129 episodes
1999-2001	Rugrats	Lucy Carmichael	Voice, 7 episodes
2001	The Proud Family	Gertie Dinkins	Voice, 1 episode
2003-2008	All Grown Up!	Lucy Carmichael	Voice, 17 episodes
2002-2004	Scrubs	Margaret Turk	2 episodes
2004	ER	Singing Woman	1 episode
2005	Girlfriends	Nurse Helen	1 episode
2008	Numb3rs	Eileen	1 episode
2008	The Game	Miss Leola	1 episode
2009	Cold Case	Regina Reynolds	1 episode
2009	Castle	Sally Niedermeyer	1 episode
2011	Reed Between the Lines	Elizabeth 'Liz' Reed	1 episode
2012-2015	The Soul Man	Sister Coriann Pearly	Recurring
2012	Mike & Molly	Rose	1 episode
