= List of The Spectacular Spider-Man characters =

List of characters that appeared in the television series The Spectacular Spider-Man

Character designs for some of the main characters in The Spectacular Spider-Man. Left to right: Mary Jane Watson, Gwen Stacy, Harry Osborn, Spider-Man, his civilian form Peter Parker, J. Jonah Jameson, Dr. Curt Connors and Eddie Brock.

The animated television series The Spectacular Spider-Man features an extensive cast of characters originally created by Stan Lee, Steve Ditko and other comic book creators. Greg Weisman and Victor Cook and the rest of the crew redesigned these classic characters in the series to be more modern but remain faithful to its characters in the comics. Most of these characters are based on the characters in the original mainstream universe but there have been characters that have been introduced from the Ultimate Marvel universe such as Kenny Kong and characters from Sam Raimi's film series such as Bernard Houseman as well. The majority of the villains that have debuted in the show have started out as supporting characters before becoming villains. The character's portrayals in the shows have mainly gained positive reviews from TV critics.

== Overview ==
| Character | Voiced by | Seasons | | Spider-Verse films | |
| Character | Voiced by | Season 1 | Season 2 | Across | Beyond |
| Character | Voiced by | 2008 | 2009 | 2023 | 2024 |
Main characters
| Peter Parker / Spider-Man | Josh Keaton | Main | Main | Guest | Guest |
| Gwen Stacy | Lacey Chabert | Main | Main | (Note: Hailee Steinfeld voices an alternate Gwen Stacy from Earth-65.) | |
| Harry Osborn | James Arnold Taylor | Main | Main | | |
| J. Jonah Jameson | Daran Norris | Main | Main | (Note: J. K. Simmons voices alternate versions of Jameson from Earth-1610, Earth-13122, Earth-65, and Earth-42.) | |
| Mary Jane Watson | Vanessa Marshall | Main | Main | (Note: Melissa Sturm and Nicole Delaney voice alternate versions of Mary Jane from Earth-616 and Earth-65 respectively.) | |
| Flash Thompson | Joshua LeBar | Main | Main | | |
| Liz Allan | Alanna Ubach | Recurring | Main | | |
| Captain George Stacy | Clancy Brown | Recurring | Main | Archive (Note: Shea Whigham also voices an alternate Captain George Stacy from Earth-65.) | |
| Norman Osborn / Green Goblin | Alan Rachins (Note: Steve Blum provides Norman Osborn's disguised voice as the Green Goblin in a recurring capacity in the first and second seasons.) | Recurring | Main | (Note: Jorma Taccone voices an alternate Norman Osborn / Green Goblin from Earth-1610.) | |
Supporting characters
| Aunt May Parker | Deborah Strang | Recurring | Recurring | (Note: Elizabeth Perkins voices an alternate May Parker from Earth-65.) | |
| Uncle Ben Parker | Ed Asner | Recurring | Recurring | Archive | |
| Dr. Curt Connors / Lizard | Dee Bradley Baker | Recurring | Recurring | (Note: Jack Quaid voices an alternate Lizard from Earth-65.) | |

== Role in The Spectacular Spider-Man ==
The main protagonist of the series is Peter Parker, a young teenager who attends midtown high school and is an extremely bright honors student. Peter is also secretly a superhero called Spider-Man. In school, his two best friends are Gwen Stacy and Harry Osborn. Peter is constantly being bullied and taunted by his shallow, more popular peers—particularly football star Flash Thompson (due to the fact that Peter is a shy science nerd who has a scholastic interest toward science) —and, as Spider-Man, engenders the editorial wrath of newspaper publisher J. Jonah Jameson. Ironically enough, much to Peter's dismay, Flash Thompson is also one of Spider-Man's biggest fans. Also at school, Peter's feelings wrestle between Gwen Stacy and Liz Allan. Peter Parker soon finds himself getting a job at the Daily Bugle as a freelance photographer working with characters such as J. Jonah Jameson, Robbie Robertson, Betty Brant, Ned Lee and Frederick Foswell. Parker as Spider-Man fights a lot of villains in the series as the majority of his rogues gallery in the comics are introduced in this series. Season one introduces villains such as Vulture, Electro, Lizard, Shocker, Sandman, Rhino, Green Goblin, Doctor Octopus, Venom, Hammerhead, and Tombstone. Season two introduces Mysterio, Kraven the Hunter, Molten Man, and Silvermane.

== Creation and concept ==
We're retooling and redesigning things for the modern day but we want the characters to still be iconic. We want you to see our updated version of the Vulture and still say "yep, that's the Vulture" and "yeah, that's the Green Goblin." It's a contemporary version but the changes aren't there just for the sake of making changes. It's still true to what Lee, Ditko and Romita did.

— Greg Weisman"

As story editor, Greg Weisman approached the character by going and buying the first seven volumes of The Essential Spider-Man and reread them. The creator Greg Weisman originally grew up on Stan Lee and John Romita Sr., the comic book writers who created the characters and he later went back and read the original Stan Lee and Steve Ditko stories. He then re-read them and took copious notes and tried to get the voice of those early stories, put his own spin on some of the origins and the costume designs and wanted to create something that was coherent, cohesive, contemporary and classic.

Greg Weisman stated:

"Peter's life has a lot of interesting characters and we wanted to bring them in -- the important ones and the most obscure."

Because Sally Avril's character was later developed in Untold Tales of Spider-Man the creators used her. In Season 2, he used Bernard Houseman from the movie. The creators didn't want to wait several seasons to introduce Gwen Stacy, Harry Osborn and Mary Jane Watson, all of whom met Peter when he was in college in the comics. The creators wanted to stay true to the characters and tried to figure out what they would have been like in high school. "What kind of guy would Harry Osborn have been back in high school?" Greg Weisman stated that. "It doesn't mean taking his college character and just sticking it in high school, it means extrapolating what he may have been like back then. Same thing with Gwen Stacy, and later with Mary Jane. We included those characters because they meant a lot in Peter's life and were iconic."

As for having guest stars in the show, the creators didn't want the show to be guest star of the week. The creators felt that if they started bringing people in too early, viewers would keep asking "well, who's gonna show up next?" and it would be a distraction from their main characters who are so interesting. Greg Weisman stated:

The Marvel Universe was basically built on the fly. Since we're starting this cartoon from scratch, we have the luxury of building a more cohesive universe from day one because we know where we're going to go with these characters and who's going to come later.

The characters that the creators decided to put on the show came from some kind of source and were never intended to be original characters. The characters either came from the mainstream comics, the Ultimate Spider-Man comics or in the Spider-Man films.

== Main characters ==
The main characters featured in the opening credits:

=== Peter Parker / Spider-Man ===
Peter Benjamin Parker / Spider-Man (voiced by Josh Keaton) is the titular protagonist of the series. Bitten on the hand by a radioactive spider during a field trip to Empire State University, Peter gained superhuman spider-powers including superhuman speed, strength, agility, durability, stamina, reflexes, coordination and balance, as well as the ability to cling to solid surfaces. His most notable ability however is his "spider sense," which allows him to sense danger and react quickly. He would also design his own equipment to supplement his powers, such as his web-shooters, which he can use to shoot artificial webbing at his foes, and swing through the city. One day, Peter donned a spider costume and sought to fight crime after allowing a burglar to escape, only for that same criminal to kill his Uncle Ben in a mugging. He learned that "with great power there must also come great responsibility", a phrase that now drives him to act as Spider-Man. The series focuses on the character's struggles while leading a double life as Parker in Midtown High, maintaining a job at the Daily Bugle, and as the superhero Spider-Man, with his friendships often being damaged by his business. Despite their financial troubles, the 16-year-old and his Aunt May have a great relationship. His best friends in school are mainly Gwen Stacy, Harry Osborn and gradually Mary Jane Watson. Peter is extremely bright, and became an honors student at Midtown High School. Although, Peter's shyness and scholastic interest, especially in science, often make him a social outcast and he is often bullied and called names like "Puny Parker" by his shallow popular peers. Although his powers have given him confidence, he often has to take the taunts to stop anyone suspecting his secret. Keaton stated, "I grew up reading comic books and Spider-Man was always one of my favorites. I felt that I always identified with him. Spider-Man is awesome. I definitely was a huge Spider-Man fan growing up and still am." Before he was chosen for Spider-Man, Keaton auditioned for the roles of Harry Osborn and Eddie Brock.

This version of Spider-Man appears in Spider-Man: Across the Spider-Verse as a member of the Spider-Society, with Keaton reprising his role.

=== Gwen Stacy ===
Gwen Stacy (voiced by Lacey Chabert) is the main love interest of Peter Parker in the show. Gwen is the daughter of police captain George Stacy, and is one of Peter Parker's best friends and intellectual equal; they are both recommended by their teacher to work in the lab of Doctor Connors. Although initially strong willed, kind, harboring deep feelings for her best friend Peter and unconcerned with her appearance, she gradually evolves into a more confident and attractive character more closely resembling and truly faithful to her comic book counterpart. She is always supportive of Peter, and also shows well-meaning concern for Harry Osborn. Although she is Peter's best friend, her weakness is that she has a colossal crush on Peter.

=== Harry Osborn ===
Harry Osborn (voiced by James Arnold Taylor) is portrayed as Peter Parker's best friend and is Norman Osborn's son. While being true to his comic counterpart, he constantly lives in his father's shadow and considers Peter a good friend, though at times also resents him for earning Norman's approval, which Harry has never been able to do. Being ignored and neglected by his father and overprotective of his mother and just like Peter, he is an unpopular kid at school. With his lack of approval, he is prone to do anything to get it.

=== J. Jonah Jameson ===
J. Jonah Jameson (voiced by Daran Norris) is portrayed as a loudmouth, irascible, egotistical, and gruff publisher of the Daily Bugle. Showing excessive pride in his son John Jameson, he is obsessed with exposing fraudulent claims to heroism, and is therefore always demanding pictures of Spider-Man so that he can continue his smear campaign against the vigilante that has, at least temporarily, turned much of the gullible city against the hero. Even though he loves to sell newspapers of Spider-Man and takes delight in anything that might discredit or defame him, he feels that the real heroes are ones that have nothing to hide such as his son and will do anything to get him on the spotlight instead of Spider-Man. He is shown as a foolishly stubborn and pompous skinflint who micromanages his employees and resents Spider-Man out of jealousy. However, he reluctantly will give Spider-Man credit where it is due, and will always print retractions for unfair allegations. Aside from that, he retains his dislike for Spider-Man from the comics, and takes delight in anything that might discredit or defame him and considers Spider-Man a menace and a vigilante.

=== Mary Jane Watson ===
Mary Jane Watson (voiced by Vanessa Marshall) is portrayed as the niece of Anna Watson. She attends the Fall Formal as Peter Parker's date before ultimately switching schools to be at Midtown. Mary Jane befriends Peter and Gwen Stacy, and is initially determined to stay single, desiring to be a "free agent". Marshall states "I always make sure my choices for Mary Jane are that of an independent thinker, that she's not concerned with what the people around her think, which is an uncommon trait in teenage girls, there's a distinct confidence about her that I try to emulate". She also explained about the character she played "Mary Jane's character is incredibly complex, Her strength plays a major part in Peter's growth and maturation she really keeps him on the straight and narrow. Even though our characters are still only in high school during this cartoon, and you're not going to get a lot of that character development at this point of the series, I know it's going to be there in the future and so that has an effect on how I play her now".

=== Flash Thompson ===
Flash Thompson (voiced by Joshua LeBar) is a high school student, the star quarterback of the Midtown High football team, and a prominent school bully. While he idolizes Spider-Man, he frequently bullies and harasses the high school bookworm Peter Parker, believing him to be a "stuck-up egghead", despite the fact that they had originally been friends when they were much younger. He nevertheless idolizes the superhero Spider-Man, being one of his biggest and most loyal fans. LeBar said this about the character he played. "I think Flash has a certain brashness, but he also has a likeability, so he's not a complete doof that you hate. He's a dichotomy – he's got a few different sides, and he surprises people. I was both a theatre guy and a football guy in high school, and people tried to stick me into that one-note category, depending on how they knew me – and I didn't like being stereotyped. So when the (Spider-Man) show gives me the opportunity to represent his other sides, like this week when you see Flash's compassion rather than just all that testosterone, I really enjoy showcasing that part of his character because I can relate to his situation".

=== Liz Allan ===
Liz Allan (voiced by Alanna Ubach) is depicted as a popular girl and cheerleader at Midtown High. Unlike her comic book counterpart version, who is White and a blonde, she is depicted as a Latina in this series. She is initially Flash Thompson's girlfriend and shows great resentment towards Peter Parker. As the series progresses, her true feelings become apparent as she demonstrates a much more open and accepting side. She commonly refers to Peter as "Petey". Peter and her begin to date for some time until Peter gets honest with himself about who he really wants to be with.

=== Captain George Stacy ===
George Stacy (voiced by Clancy Brown) is Gwen Stacy's protective father and a police captain. He is open-minded, and truly believes Spider-Man to be a hero, while J. Jonah Jameson accuses Spider-Man of being a menace. Just like in the comics, it seems apparent that he knows that Peter Parker is Spider-Man by giving him strong signals and helping him out with rough situations. Spider-Man: Across the Spider-Verse reveals that George was killed in a battle with the Green Goblin sometime after the series' end.

=== Norman Osborn / Green Goblin ===
Norman Osborn / Green Goblin (voiced by Alan Rachins and Steve Blum, respectively) is the main antagonist of the series and the archenemy of Spider-Man, having clandestinely manipulated many of the show's events since its inception. Introduced as Harry Osborn's father and the ruthless head of OsCorp Industries who stubbornly believes he is incapable of failure and never apologizes (even to his son), Norman is hired by Tombstone to create several supervillains to distract Spider-Man from interfering with his criminal operations. To seize control of the criminal underworld from Tombstone, Norman exposes himself to a performance-enhancing formula and uses advanced weapons and equipment to become the Green Goblin. When Spider-Man grows suspicious of him, Norman frames Harry for being the Goblin and temporarily retires his alter ego. Norman later orchestrates a gang war between Tombstone, Doctor Octopus, and Silvermane to eliminate his opposition, allowing him to resurface as the Green Goblin and become New York City's reigning crime lord. Though he is seemingly killed during his final battle with Spider-Man in the series finale, Norman survives and heads to Florida to keep a low profile.

In Spider-Man: Across the Spider-Verse, it is revealed that the Green Goblin eventually returned to face Spider-Man, with one of their battles resulting in the death of George Stacy.

== Supporting characters ==
The series sports a very wide supporting cast. Every named character who appears in the series, even very minor characters, is based on a character who appeared in the original comics, Ultimate Spider-Man series (such as Kenny Kong), or film series (such as Bernard Houseman).

- Aunt May (voiced by Deborah Strang) is the widow of the deceased Ben Parker and aunt to the orphan Peter Parker. In the episode "Group Therapy", she suffers a heart attack while out to a Broadway show with her friend Anna Watson during the Sinister Six's attack. She later recovers, but Peter continues to worry for her safety.
- Uncle Ben (voiced by Ed Asner) is Peter Parker's uncle that raised him along with May Parker in their Forest Hills home. When his parents died in a plane crash when they were young, Peter, while competing in a wrestling competition, allowed a burglar (later revealed to be Walter Hardy) to escape as revenge against Sullivan Edwards for not paying him the prize money. The burglar broke into their home and ended up shooting and killing Ben and stealing his car. Later during his career as the superhero Spider-Man, Peter used the memory of Ben to help him get rid of the symbiote.
- Dr. Curt Connors / Lizard (voiced by Dee Bradley Baker) is a brilliant biologist who lost his arm while working as a surgeon in the United States Army. Despite obtaining a prosthetic arm, he experiments with reptiles to regrow his arm, which temporarily transforms him into a humanoid lizard monster.
- Martha Connors (voiced by Kath Soucie) is Dr. Curt Connors' wife and fellow scientist.
- Rand Robertson (voiced by Phil LaMarr) is on the Midtown High School football team with Flash Thompson, but is shown in the show to be much nicer and more neutral than his teammates. He is also friends with Peter Parker and Harry Osborn. He is dating Sally Avril and is Robbie Robertson's son.
- Kenny Kong (voiced by Andrew Kishino) is on the Midtown High School football team and is Flash Thompson's best friend and sidekick as the school bully. He is also Glory Grant's boyfriend through most of the show.
- Hobie Brown (voiced by Charles Duckworth) is a friend of Flash Thompson's who is also on the Midtown High School football team as of the episode "Competition". A recurring joke throughout the second season is having him not having a speaking role in the series, and is usually interrupted when he is about to speak.
- Glory Grant (voiced by Cree Summer) is one of the few in the show who seems less arrogant about her status unlike most of the other popular kids at Midtown High School and behaves more friendly towards the unpopular kids such as Peter Parker and Harry Osborn. She is shown to be Kenny Kong's girlfriend through most of the show.
- Sally Avril (voiced by Grey DeLisle) is Randy Robertson's snobby cheerleader girlfriend and Peter Parker's one-time crush.
- Sha Shan Nguyen (voiced by Kelly Hu) is Flash Thompson's love interest after being dumped by Liz Allan.
- Aaron Warren (voiced by Brian George) is Midtown High School's biology teacher and the brother of Miles Warren. He appeared to have a multi-sided attitude towards his top student, Peter Parker, and recommended Peter and Gwen Stacy, his brightest students, for the internship positions with Dr. Curt Connors at Empire State University.
- Betty Brant (voiced by Grey DeLisle) is J. Jonah Jameson's personal secretary. She is shown in the show to be calm and collected, even during Jameson's constant outrages.
- Robbie Robertson (voiced by Phil LaMarr) is the Daily Bugle's editor-in-chief and Randy Robertson's father. He is shown to be one of the few people who considers Spider-Man as a true hero.
- Ned Lee (voiced by Andrew Kishino) is a reporter for the Daily Bugle and one of Peter Parker's coworkers.
- Frederick Foswell / Patch (voiced by James Arnold Taylor) is a reporter at the Daily Bugle.
- John Jameson (voiced by Daran Norris) is an Air Force colonel, astronaut, and J. Jonah Jameson's son. It is his space mission that brought the alien symbiote to Earth, and on that same mission exposure to a spore temporarily endows him with superhuman size and strength, but also a mental instability. Spider-Man subdues him until the spores wear off.
- Felicia Hardy / Black Cat (voiced by Tricia Helfer) is depicted as simply being a thief, and her real identity has yet to be seen. She is shown to possess a wit like Spider-Man does, and has even implied to have a romantic interest for him, having flirted with him every time they met. However, in attempting to break her father (Walter Hardy, aka the Cat Burglar, and Ben Parker's killer) out of prison, she blames Spider-Man for Walter's decision to remain in prison out of shame for his crime.

=== Minor characters ===
- Jean DeWolff (voiced by Irene Bedard) is a police officer for the New York City Police Department partnered with Stan Carter. Unlike Captain Stacy and Carter, she does not consider Spider-Man as much help as most of the criminals he captures wind up being released.
- Stan Carter (voiced by Thomas F. Wilson) is a New York City police officer partnered with Jean DeWolff. He has a short temper and has shown an appreciation of Spider-Man's vigilantism.
- Anna Watson (voiced by Kath Soucie) is May Parker's friend, and Mary Jane Watson's aunt, who lives next door.
- Seymour O'Reilly (voiced by Steve Blum) is a student at Midtown High School that appeared in the episodes "Destructive Testing", "First Steps", "Identity Crisis" and "Opening Night".
- Tiny McKeever is on the Midtown High School football team with Flash Thompson. He is usually seen when the members of the football team are in a group.
- Billy Connors (voiced by Max Burkholder) is the son of Curt Connors and Martha Connors.
- Nicholas Bromwell (voiced by Dorian Harewood) is a doctor at the New York City Emergency Hospital and a good friend of May Parker.
- Ashley Kafka (voiced by Elisa Gabrielli) is a psychiatrist at Ravencroft.
- Ted Twaki (voiced by Clyde Kusatsu) is Tri-Corp's head scientist who appears in the episode "Reaction".
- Mayor Waters (voiced by B. J. Ward) is the Mayor of New York City with hopes of reelection.
- Dilbert Trilby (voiced by Steve Blum) is a newscaster who reported on the shuttle that John Jameson piloted.
- St. John Devereaux (voiced by Jeff Bennett) is Midtown High School's theater teacher. He cast, produced and directed a school production of A Midsummer Night's Dream where many students took part. He first appeared in the episode "Group Therapy", where he was to play Falstaff in a production of The Merry Wives of Windsor before the show was cancelled due to Spider-Man's fight with the Sinister Six.
- Sullivan Edwards (voiced by Robert Costanzo)
- Crusher Hogan (voiced by Jim Cummings) is a wrestler who Peter battled at the beginning of his career, when he was using his powers for profit.
- Debra Whitman is Miles Warren's employee and Eddie Brock's replacement.
- Calypso Ezili (voiced by Angela Bryant) is Kraven the Hunter's partner and lover.
- Blackie Gaxton (voiced by Steve Blum) is a mobster, manager of the Big Sky Lounge, and one of the people who transformed Mark Allan into Molten Man.
- Morris Bench (voiced by Bill Fagerbakke) is a demolitions expert who works for Norman Osborn.
- Donald Menken (voiced by Greg Weisman) is Norman Osborn's loyal employee.
- Joan Jameson (voiced by Jane Lynch) is J. Jonah Jameson's wife.
- Bernard Houseman (voiced by Jeff Bennett) is Norman Osborn's butler.
- Vin Gonzales and his partner Alan O'Neal are prominent police officers.
- Walter Hardy (voiced by Jim Cummings in the first appearance, James Remar in the second appearance) is Felicia Hardy's father and the burglar who shot Ben Parker. He later expresses regret for his actions, but Spider-Man refuses to forgive him.
- Roderick Kingsley (voiced by Courtney B. Vance) is one of the men who participated in the auction of the Rhino supersoldier blueprints and outbid everyone else. He is said to own a perfume company.
- Emily Osborn is Norman Osborn's wife and Harry Osborn's mother. She is primarily a background character, but would have had a more prominent role and been voiced by Marina Sirtis in the series' cancelled third season.

=== Cameos of real people ===
- Series producer and writer Greg Weisman is the supervising writer of the series. He appears in the series' theme song.
- Series director Victor Cook appears in the series' theme song as well as the episode "Gangland".
- Series character designer Sean Galloway appears as the disc jockey at the Fall Formal in the episode "Catalysts".
- Longtime Marvel employee Stan Lee voices a dock worker in the episode "Blueprints".

== Villains ==
The series incorporates numerous villains from different eras of the Spider-Man mythology, almost all of whom are introduced as regular characters before they adopt their established villain identities in later episodes.

- L. Thompson Lincoln / Tombstone / Big Man (voiced by Keith David in the pilot and Kevin Michael Richardson in subsequent appearances) is New York City's pre-eminent crime lord throughout much of the series. To the public, Lincoln is a wealthy and benevolent philanthropist born with a form of albinism. He secretly operates as the "Big Man of Crime" who orchestrates the creation of various supervillains to distract Spider-Man from interfering with his empire. Tombstone is later caught in a gang war with Doctor Octopus and Silvermane, which ends with the Green Goblin usurping his position in the criminal underworld.
- Hammerhead (voiced by John DiMaggio) is a mob enforcer and Tombstone's right-hand man responsible for overseeing many of his illegal operations. He once worked for Silvermane and had a relationship with Silver Sable. Hammerhead is later manipulated by the Green Goblin to betray Tombstone.
- The Enforcers / New Enforcers are a group of hired assassins:
  - Montana / Shocker (voiced by Jeff Bennett) is a southern mercenary and the Enforcers' field leader who considers it his responsibility to kill Spider-Man. He dons a battlesuit stolen from Tricorp with shockwave-generating gauntlets to become the Shocker. He becomes a member of the original Sinister Six. Montana was chosen to be Shocker because producer Greg Weisman felt he was more interesting and threatening than Herman Schultz, Shocker's alter ego in the comics.
  - Fancy Dan (voiced by Phil LaMarr) is an athletic martial artist and the Enforcers' combat specialist. He receives a high-tech suit from the Tinkerer capable of absorbing kinetic energy and becomes Ricochet.
  - Ox (voiced by Clancy Brown in the pilot and Danny Trejo in subsequent appearances) is a strongman and the Enforcers' brute force.
- Adrian Toomes / Vulture (voiced by Robert Englund) is an underachieving aerodynamics engineer who uses a winged suit equipped with anti-gravity technology to seek revenge against Norman Osborn for stealing and profiting off his inventions. He becomes a member of the Sinister Six to defeat Spider-Man for foiling his attempts on Osborn's life.
- Max Dillon / Electro (voiced by Crispin Freeman) is an electrician who, after falling victim to a freak laboratory accident, gains the ability to control electricity. Driven mad and seeking a cure for his condition, Electro becomes a member of the Sinister Six.
- Flint Marko / Sandman (voiced by John DiMaggio) is a petty thief who undergoes an experiment that accidentally transforms him into a being made of sand. He becomes a member of the Sinister Six to seek revenge against Spider-Man for foiling his numerous robberies.
- Alex O'Hirn / Rhino (voiced by Clancy Brown) is a dim-witted thug who volunteers for an experimental procedure that bonds him to an indestructible, animal-themed armor so that he can seek revenge against Spider-Man for repeatedly defeating and humiliating him. He becomes a member of the Sinister Six.
- Otto Octavius / Doctor Octopus / Master Planner (voiced by Peter MacNicol) is a timid scientist at OsCorp who, as a result of the Green Goblin's machinations, has a set of advanced mechanical arms fused to his spine. He is driven insane and becomes a vengeful supervillain, the leader of the Sinister Six, and a crime lord known as the "Master Planner".
- Chameleon (voiced by Steve Blum) is an international spy-for-hire and master of disguise. Norman Osborn hires him to pose as him in public and decrease suspicion.
- Eddie Brock / Venom (voiced by Benjamin Diskin) is a close friend of Peter Parker who becomes bonded with an alien symbiote. Eddie and Peter's parents died together in a plane crash. As the series progresses, Eddie develops an animosity towards Peter due to a series of misunderstandings, often involving Peter letting those closest to him down to fulfill his responsibilities as Spider-Man, which damages their friendship. Eddie's growing hatred attracts a symbiote previously bonded to and discarded by Spider-Man, and the two merge while Eddie learns of Peter's alter ego. Together, they become "Venom" to seek revenge against Spider-Man.
- Miles Warren (voiced by Brian George) is Aaron Warren's younger brother and a cutthroat professor of biochemistry at Empire State University. He gives Kraven the Hunter superhuman powers and is later hired by the Green Goblin to turn Mark Allan into Molten Man.
- Quentin Beck / Mysterio (voiced by Xander Berkeley) is an expert of special effects who uses illusionary technology to commit crimes. Originally the Chameleon's right-hand man, Beck later strikes off on his own as "Mysterio", the self-proclaimed master of illusion. He becomes a member of the second Sinister Six.
- Phineas Mason / Tinkerer (voiced by Thom Adcox-Hernandez) is an inventor who develops advanced technology for various criminals, including the Chameleon, the Master Planner and Tombstone.
- Sergei Kravinoff / Kraven the Hunter (voiced by Eric Vesbit) is a skilled big-game hunter who considers Spider-Man his most elusive and formidable prey. Later in the series, Miles Warren transforms Kraven into a feline humanoid, after which he joins the second Sinister Six.
- Sable Manfredi / Silver Sable (voiced by Nikki Cox) is Silvermane's daughter and enforcer. She was once in a relationship with Hammerhead.
- Silvio Manfredi / Silvermane (voiced by Miguel Ferrer) is the father of Silver Sable and a rival crime lord to Tombstone and Doctor Octopus. He was once New York City's most powerful crime boss before being arrested by the FBI, allowing Tombstone to take over his empire. Upon being released from prison, Silvermane attempts to reclaim his position only to be defeated and re-imprisoned by Spider-Man.
- Mark Allan / Molten Man (voiced by Eric Lopez) is a gambling addict and Liz Allan's older brother. After being released from juvenile hall, he returns to school and becomes the love interest of Mary Jane Watson. Mark later falls victim to his old gambling habits and is forcibly infused with nanotechnology, gaining the ability to encase himself in heated organic armor. His abilities are controlled by the Green Goblin, who blackmails Mark into destroying Spider-Man for him.

== Reception ==
Goldman wrote that Electro's redesigned costume retained "some nice visual nods to the Electro many of us grew up with." Liz Allan's characterization, though, he found confusing, with the character's accent and background unclear. Goldman also praised the Lizard's design, calling it "the most visually familiar villain the show had introduced yet". Goldman enjoyed the design of Shocker which he felt stayed true to his original design and was "intrigued" by changing his secret identity. Goldman also praised the unveiling of Tombstone and Mary Jane Watson. Goldman gave a mixed response about Green Goblin — noting that he is "perhaps a bit hyper sensitive on how he's portrayed" — considering the design, while similar to the comics, be more of an exact version of it; Goldman considered the character's personality was "a bit too evocative of the Joker," the iconic villain from DC's Batman comics, but believed that his "malice side" worked. Goldman also praised Mary Jane Watson for being "much like Stan Lee created her – a quick witted, fun loving girl." He also applauded the mysterious factors of Green Goblin's true identity. Goldman opted that Jonah's hatred of Spider-Man that was formed in the episode was "perhaps the most understandable and best way it's ever been portrayed before."

Season Elliot, senior editor of iF Magazine, wrote "The Lizard himself was a nice update of the original Lizard and he was still in his torn pants, shirt, and lab coat." Elliot praised the design for differentiating itself from that used for Spider-Man or Spider-Man: The New Animated Series, and that he "can't wait for the action figure of this guy!" He also stated "Even the Shocker was more interesting on this show, so I continue to have high hopes for future episodes, characters, and villains." When talking about the change of Shocker's secret identity, he quoted that it "saves the writers from having to come up with a completely different origin for a character that pretty much is a second tier villain anyways." Elliot was "pleased" with the portrayal of Rhino as an unintelligent brute; he also enjoyed the change of the "Big Man's" identity from that of the comics - where he was a Bugle reporter named Frederic Foswell - and found it humorous to have Foswell be the reporter to tell Peter who the "Big Man" is rumored to be. Similar to Goldman, Elliot applauded the mystery of Goblin's true identity, which he described as a "bait and switch."

Rob M. Worley of Mania described Doctor Octopus' introduction as "explosive," while praising Peter MacNicol for balancing such a heavy workload between both the episode and other series.
