= James Stovall =

American actor

James Herbert Stovall, Jr. (May 16, 1958 – September 25, 2010) was an American actor best known for his work in Broadway and regional theater, appearing in productions of Once on This Island, The Life and Ragtime, and The Rocky Horror Show, having made his Broadway debut in the short-lived production of Bob Fosse's musical Big Deal. He also created and directed Nativity: A Life Story, an African American-themed musical intended to become an annual Christmas season performance.

== Life and career ==
Stovall was born on May 16, 1958, in Baltimore, Maryland. His sister Donna Stovall Jefferss recalled that Stovall was "singing and singing loudly, for the purpose of making my mother laugh and smile" as a four-year-old and by the next year "was playing the keys on the piano", calling his future success "prophetic". He attended the Gilman School and continued his formal education in piano and voice at the Peabody Conservatory. When he was 13 years old he started training at the Urban Musical Theater at Morgan State University, where Debbie Allen, then a student at Howard University, was one of his dance instructors. He earned his undergraduate degree at Morehouse College, where Spike Lee and Samuel L. Jackson were some of the members of his class. He joined the Actors' Equity Association when he performed with Atlanta's Alliance Theatre while he was still a sophomore at Morehouse.

He first appeared on Broadway in Big Deal, a brief 1986 production by Bob Fosse in which Stovall was an understudy performer for three different roles in the play. He also appeared on Broadway in Once on This Island, The Life, The Rocky Horror Show and the revival of Finian's Rainbow, as well as appearing in Fosse's Sweet Charity, ultimately performing in the role of Big Daddy, and in Ragtime, where he performed in the lead role of Coalhouse Walker, Jr., after appearing in the role in productions of the musical in Chicago and Los Angeles. He appeared in Off Broadway plays such as Dessa Rose, Romance in Hard Times, Stars in Your Eyes and appeared in Joseph and the Amazing Technicolor Dreamcoat in a touring production that featured Donny Osmond. Warren Carlyle, who directed and choreographed him in Finian's Rainbow, told Playbill how Stovall "sang the preacher's solo at the climax of Act One and blew the roof off every night, not only inspiring audiences to cheer and applaud but also his fellow cast members to sing and dance that little bit harder."

Stovall was one of the creators of Nativity: A Life Story, an African American oriented musical work that was intended to become a holiday tradition, based on the Black Nativity written by Langston Hughes and first performed in 1961. He was executive director of the Ministry of the Arts & Culture at Reverend Ike's United Palace Theater in Washington Heights, Manhattan, which had become the home for Nativity.

== Death ==
Stovall died at age 52 on September 25, 2010, in New York City at NewYork-Presbyterian Hospital due to heart failure. He had been undergoing treatment for a heart condition. Stovall was survived by his father, Rev. James Stovall, Sr.
