= List of Spider-Man (1967 TV series) episodes =

Spider-Man is an animated television series featuring the Marvel Comics superhero Spider-Man. Grantray-Lawrence Animation produced the first season, while the second and third seasons were produced by Krantz Animation, Inc. and were crafted by producer Ralph Bakshi in New York City.

The show first aired on the ABC television network on September 9, 1967, but went into syndication with the start of the third season. It ran for three seasons and finished on June 14, 1970, with a total of 52 episodes. Many of the 30-minute episodes from season 1 and season 3 were divided into two 15-minute story segments.

== Series overview ==
Season	Episodes	Originally released	
Season	Episodes	First released	Last released
1	20	September 9, 1967	January 20, 1968
2	19	September 14, 1968	January 18, 1969
3	13	March 22, 1970	June 14, 1970

== Episodes ==
=== Season 1 (1967–68) ===
The animation for the first season of Spider-Man was produced by Grantray-Lawrence Animation. Ray Patterson was the producer. Animation was performed by Hal Ambro, Bob Bentley, and Dan Bessie, among others. Direction in episode 1 was provided by Grant Simmons, Clyde Geronimi, and Sid Marcus. Grantray-Lawrence Animation went bankrupt after producing the first 20 episodes, leaving another 32 episodes in the series order unproduced.

Most first-season episodes consisted of two story segments per half-hour episode, though the third and the eighth episodes consisted of a single episode.

List of Spider-Man season 1 episodes
No. overall	No. in season	Title	Original release date	Prod. code
1a	1a	"The Power of Dr Octopus"	September 9, 1967	1
Teenage photographer Peter Parker is sent by the Daily Bugle to investigate a series of mystery lights in a wooded area outside of the city, when a sudden landslide forces him to swerve off the road and land in a tree. Realizing he is in a precarious spot, Peter slides down in the driver's seat and out of sight, only to rise back up again as he finishes a quick change into Spider-Man. He lowers the car to the ground and finds the hidden entrance to a secret laboratory operated by his nemesis, Doctor Octopus, who captures the young hero and reveals his plan to blow up part of New York City. Octopus has also sent a warning letter to the Daily Bugle about it, so that people can evacuate before the demonstration, but J. Jonah Jameson thinks it is just a crank letter. Spider-Man breaks free, but is caught when a cage is dropped onto him. Betty Brant drives off to the place that Peter was heading to, but she is also captured. Spider-Man escapes his cage, but is knocked out and captured again. Spider-Man manages to free both himself and Betty, then stops the nefarious villain in his tracks, saving the city from destruction.
1b	1b	"Sub-Zero for Spidey"	September 9, 1967	1
On a blistering hot afternoon, Peter is walking to the house of a brilliant scientist, Doctor Smartyr, when suddenly he notices that the sidewalk and most of the neighborhood is turning to ice. Hearing desperate cries for help from Smartyr's house, Peter changes into Spider-Man and breaks through a laboratory window to find the frightened scientist being menaced by a towering ice creature. It leaves, and Spider-Man finds a giant iceberg in New York Harbor. He returns to Dr Smartyr, who deduces that the ice creature comes from Pluto, but more ice creatures arrive, freezing him and Smartyr and kidnapping the scientist. The ice creatures actually do turn out to be 'Plutonians' and are not hostile. They are seeking out Dr Smartyr for a way to help them get back to their home planet.
2a	2a	"Where Crawls the Lizard"	September 16, 1967	2
Peter flies to Florida to find and photograph the Lizard. Spider-Man meets Dr Curtis Connor's family. He is pulled underwater by the Lizard, but escapes. In Dr Connor's lab, Spider-Man finds out about the doctor's research on swamp fever and mixes an antidote for reptilian mutation. He fights the Lizard in a ruined Spanish fort and turns him back into Dr Connors.
2b	2b	"Electro, the Human Lightning Bolt"	September 16, 1967	2
Spider-Man is set up numerous times by Electro's robberies. Electro first robs J. Jonah Jameson's house and escapes before the police see him, though they see Spider-Man. Peter shows Jameson the photo, but he throws it away. Spider-Man finally tracks Electro to an abandoned amusement park and catches him using a new web. He leaves him hanging outside of Jameson's window.
3	3	"The Menace of Mysterio"	September 23, 1967	3
Spider-Man has been witnessed committing a robbery of the Midtown Museum. Mysterio phones J. Jonah Jameson and makes a deal to defeat and expose Spider-Man in exchange for a large sum of cash. He fights Spider-Man on a bridge. Spider-Man is unable to beat him and dives from the bridge to escape. He finally tracks Mysterio to a film set and records Mysterio's confession that he robbed the museum disguised as Spider-Man. He then beats Mysterio. Notes: Based on Amazing Spider-Man #13.
4a	4a	"The Sky is Falling"	September 30, 1967	4
The Vulture uses a sonic device in his head mask to control an army of vultures. After the Vulture beats Spider-Man, he holds the city for a $2,000,000 ransom and J. Jonah Jameson blames Spider-Man. Spider-Man takes the ransom to the Vulture and uses this opportunity to sabotage the Vulture's device so the vultures attack him, then returns the ransom.
4b	4b	"Captured by J. Jonah Jameson"	September 30, 1967	4
While Spider-Man is out he is almost caught by a robot. Later an inventor named Henry Smythe reveals his plans to capture Spider-Man with the robot and get paid by J. Jonah Jameson for his efforts. Although skeptical at first, Jameson becomes enthusiastic when the robot is activated and starts zeroing in on its target. Peter makes a hasty retreat from the editor's office, but the robot lumbers after him into the street. Ducking into an alley, the teenager changes to Spider-Man before leading the robot on a frantic chase throughout the city. When the robot catches him Betty enables Spider-Man to escape by pulling out the plug to the controls, but Jameson sends her out. Spider-Man is finally caught again by the robot after knocking himself unconscious by swinging into a clock tower. However, he breaks into the robot's interior circuits and is able to free himself from the robot's tendrils. Notes: Based on Amazing Spider-Man #25.
5a	5a	"Never Step on a Scorpion"	October 7, 1967	5
Dr Stillwell creates the Scorpion on J. Jonah Jameson's behalf to capture Spider-Man. The Scorpion attacks Spider-Man, who escapes. However, the Scorpion's evil nature takes over as his strength increases which causes him to go after Jameson, but Spider-Man captures him and the Scorpion is arrested. He breaks out of prison and goes after Jameson again while Spider-Man is searching for him, but Spider-Man arrives in time to fight the Scorpion, who is webbed up and imprisoned again. Notes: Based on Amazing Spider-Man #20.
5b	5b	"Sands of Crime"	October 7, 1967	5
As Spider-Man examines the Goliath Diamond, the Sandman appears and swipes the diamond, with Spider-Man getting the blame as he is seen by the guards. The Sandman demands a 1,000,000-dollar ransom from J. Jonah Jameson. Spider-Man fights him where the ransom is due to be delivered, but the Sandman escapes before Jameson arrives and takes the ransom, only to find that he has been given a rock. Finding out that Jameson has given him a suitcase filled with pieces of paper, the Sandman demands $2,000,000. Spider-Man fights him at a rock quarry and defeats the Sandman by knocking into a trough of water, making him soggy. He then squirts the Sandman with more water from a hose, weakening him and forcing him to surrender the diamond, finally leaving him for the police. However, Peter forgot to take any pictures.
6a	6a	"Diet of Destruction"	October 14, 1967	6
Spider-Man witnesses, and photographs, a giant metal-eating robot in Central Park. It is never explained who built it. The robot sets the park on fire and while Spider-Man stops the fire spreading, it leaves. Spider-Man fights the robot throughout the city and finally causes it to fall into the river.
6b	6b	"The Witching Hour"	October 14, 1967	6
The Green Goblin swipes Grandini the Mystic's witchcraft book, hoping to control demons of the Underworld. Next, he makes J. Jonah Jameson into his medium using a spell that only affects Jameson if he reads it aloud and discovers he needs the Sceptre of Osiris, which is hidden in the magician's library in the mummy case of Grandini the Mystic. Spider-Man fails to stop this, but by putting a spider-tracer on Jameson after he reads the spell, he tracks the Goblin to a graveyard and foils his plan. The demons tell the Goblin he is not fit to join them and disappear. Spider-Man leaves the Goblin webbed up for the police.
7a	7a	"Kilowatt Kaper"	October 21, 1967	7
Electro escapes prison before Spider-Man can stop him using a metal kite during an electrical storm to renew his powers. He takes the electricity supply of the city, demanding a ransom from the city. Spider-Man tries to stop him at the factory, but only just escapes being drawn into a generator. However, Spider-Man is able to catch Electro by trapping him in an electric spider web.
7b	7b	"The Peril of Parafino"	October 21, 1967	7
Spider-Man faces off against Parafino, a wax museum owner who plans to make Spider-Man into his latest exhibit. He uses escaped convict Red Dog Melvin as bait for Spider-Man, disguising him as a waxwork. He catches Spider-Man using a wax sculpture of himself and captures Betty Brant when she comes to the museum. Spider-Man frees himself and destroys the wax Parafino by increasing the heat. While Betty gets the police, Melvin revives and attacks the real Parafino. Spider-Man webs them both up.
8	8	"Horn of the Rhino"	October 28, 1967	8
Spider-Man is keeping an eye on a train when the Rhino rams into it and steals the first component of a top secret weapon, with Spider-Man getting the blame. Meanwhile, Peter has a cold, and his Aunt May wants him to stay in bed. The Rhino then steals another component from an airport. At May's suggestion, J. Jonah Jameson decides to take his own photos. When he tries to enter a military area wearing a disguise, he is stopped by a guard. He complains about this, but his disguise falls of and is arrested. The Rhino steals the final component from a submarine. The police put a dragnet out but cannot find the Rhino. Spider-Man finds him hiding in a cave with its entrance in the pool of the rhino exhibit at the zoo and catches him using pepper.
9a	9a	"The One-Eyed Idol"	November 4, 1967	9
Someone has sent a one-eyed idol to J. Jonah Jameson. Jameson is hypnotized by the idol to steal his own money. Spider-Man finds the thief, but he escapes with the money. The next day Jameson is again hypnotized to steal more money. Spider-Man attacks the thief, but is knocked out by a boomerang, and finds the mastermind is the hunter Harley Clivendon, who tries to kill Spider-Man using an elevator. However, Spider-Man frees himself and captures both crooks.
9b	9b	"Fifth Avenue Phantom"	November 4, 1967	9
Spider-Man attempts to halt the Phantom's activities only to be set up by him and his robot henchwoman Marie, who is disguised as a shop window mannequin. He discovers the Phantom is using shrinking rays to steal items, but some of the shrunken items are in a dollhouse in the Daily Bugle. The Phantom gets into the Bugle's offices and escapes with the dollhouse. Spider-Man is finally taken to the Phantom's base and defeats both him and his three robot henchwomen.
10a	10a	"The Revenge of Dr Magneto"	November 11, 1967	10
Spider-Man saves a boat from Dr Matto Magneto's attempt to crash it on the rocks by sabotaging a lighthouse. Determined to prove his magnetic power, Dr Magneto sabotages a railway line, which Spider-Man fixes. Magneto next tries to make the statue of Prometheus fall off of the top of the Empire State Building, but Spider-Man catches it in his web. Dr Magneto meets Spider-Man at the Hall of Fame and captures him, planning to lift the entire Hall into the air by magnetism and drop it into the ocean with him in it. However, Dr Magneto is beaten with Spider-Man's anti-magnetic webbing that destroys his weapon.
10b	10b	"The Sinister Prime Minister"	November 11, 1967	10
Spider-Man gets into an embassy, and sees the foreign visiting Prime Minister tied up and gagged, and fights someone impersonating the Prime Minister, but he is forced to retreat to find proof after being gassed by the imposter's cane and having his camera stolen. The imposter convinces Jameson to help raise money for his nation, and gets $20,000,000. Spider-Man gets into the embassy again and defeats the Imposter, but is forced out. The imposter tries to leave with the gold via airplane, but Spider-Man catches him, exposes him as Charles Cameo before the police, and frees the real Prime Minister.
11a	11a	"The Night of the Villains"	November 18, 1967	11
Spider-Man fails to stop Blackbeard from stealing a treasure chest when he is knocked overboard. Next, Jesse James is sent to rob a bank, but he is stopped by Spider-Man. However, a guard sees Spider-Man and thinks he is trying to rob the bank. The Executioner of Paris is sent after Spider-Man, but is webbed up. Spider-Man realizes the Executioner is made of wax. He goes to the wax museum and meets Parafino again. Parafino sets his three robot wax dummies on Spider-Man but Spider-Man destroys the controls and defeats Parafino.
11b	11b	"Here Comes Trubble"	November 18, 1967	11
Spider-Man stops a centaur robbing a museum, which vanishes in smoke. Ms. Trubble sends a Cyclops to take care of Spider-Man, but it fails. The Goddess Diana also fails to get Spider-Man. Peter Parker investigates Ms. Trubble and a stolen statuette of Cerberus and finds it in her shop. He is attacked by Cerberus. Spider-Man finds Ms. Trubble has been conjuring legendary creatures from Greek mythology to do her bidding from a box as part of her revenge on J. Jonah Jameson for denying a story from her. Spider-Man rescues Ms. Trubble from Vulcan, who sets her book shop on fire, by destroying the box and she is sent to the hospital.
12a	12a	"Spider-Man Meets Doctor Noah Boddy"	November 25, 1967	12
J. Jonah Jameson scoffs at a man named Dr Noah Boddy, who claims to have found a means of rendering himself invisible. Boddy frames Jameson for attempted robberies and finally attacks him in the Bugle's printing press room. Spider-Man tracks down Boddy and webs him up.
12b	12b	"The Fantastic Fakir"	November 25, 1967	12
Spider-Man fails to stop a villain called the Fakir from stealing a precious ruby when he uses an illusion of an elephant against him. He goes to a visiting Maharaja's yacht and finds the Fakir is there. He escapes crocodiles that the Fakir is controlling. Spider-Man returns after another robbery and realises the Maharaja is a dummy, as the real Maharaja's yacht developed engine trouble thanks to the Fakir. In the final battle, Spider-Man takes away the Fakir's magic flute and webs him up, and the Fakir is arrested.
13a	13a	"Return of the Flying Dutchman"	December 2, 1967	13
Spider-Man deals with Mysterio taking advantage of the Flying Dutchman legend to steal a chest of pirate treasure. After catching the submarine in his web he enters the cave Mysterio is hiding in and defeats Mysterio and his two henchmen.
13b	13b	"Farewell Performance"	December 2, 1967	13
Castle Theatre is known for performances from Sarah Bernhardt, Lillian Russell, and Blackwell the Magician and is scheduled for demolition with J. Jonah Jameson's support as Peter Parker interviews known performers Emily Thorndike and James Boothe for a story. However, strange things happen like the poster for James' performance in The Strange Case of Dr Jekyll and Mr Hyde coming to life and demolition equipment being turned into different item. As there are claims that it is haunted, Spider-Man goes to the theatre and finds the Blackwell is causing them. With Spider-Man's help, Blackwell, Emily, and James make sure Jameson agrees to stop the theatre from being torn down. When Spider-Man publicly agrees in a rival newspaper that the theatre should be torn down, Jameson changes his mind.
14a	14a	"The Golden Rhino"	December 9, 1967	14
The Rhino steals a lot of gold from a truck. The Rhino is melting the gold to make a statue of himself, but does not have enough gold. He steals more and makes his statue. The police find Spider-Man when the warehouse the Rhino is hiding in is destroyed in a fight and suspect that he is responsible for the gold robbery, but he escapes. The Rhino is webbed up by Spider-Man in the sewers and, with his statue, is given to the authorities.
14b	14b	"Blueprint for Crime"	December 9, 1967	14
The Plotter, a diminutive criminal mastermind, guides thieves Ox and Cowboy to grab a series of blueprints. Spider-Man tries to stop them, but is knocked out and the blueprints are recovered by the criminals. However, they leave behind an important one and Spider-Man uses a photo of himself with the blueprint to lure them to him. He then captures the whole gang.
15a	15a	"The Spider and the Fly"	December 16, 1967	15
A mysterious criminal called the Human Fly leads Spider-Man away long enough to steal jewelry. Spider-Man then realises there are two Human Flies committing the robberies when he catches one but the other one knocks him out from behind. He uses a spider-tracer to track them to an abandoned amusement park and captures them.
15b	15b	"The Slippery Doctor Von Schlick"	December 16, 1967	15
Spider-Man chases Dr Von Schlick in the middle of a fire but loses him. Spider-Man finds Von Schlick on a barge as he steals oil from a tanker. Schlick is tracked to his base in the sewers and is defeated.
16a	16a	"The Vulture's Prey"	December 23, 1967	16
When J. Jonah Jameson investigates a malfunctioning tower clock, he is captured by the Vulture -- who is using it as a hideout while he commits a rash of spectacular crimes. From Jameson he finds out about a powerful military rocket and steals it. After failing to stop the rocket theft as Spider-Man, Peter returns to the Daily Bugle just as Jameson causes the tower clock to start chiming out of control, but the Vulture arrives. Realizing that it is a cry for help, the determined teenager changes into Spidey and rushes to the tower clock where he rescues his boss from the Vulture's clutches, but refrains from freeing the editor until he forces Jameson to say "please" first, to his humiliation.
16b	16b	"The Dark Terrors"	December 23, 1967	16
Spider-Man rescues Betty from a shadow tiger, but cannot attack it. He is then attacked and knocked out by another shadow figure. The Phantom is casting shadows all over the city to commit crimes. Spider-Man follows a gorilla shadow to a warehouse and defeats the Phantom.
17a	17a	"The Terrible Triumph of Dr Octopus"	December 30, 1967	17
Dr Octopus steals Dr Smartyr's new weapon, the Nullifier, but Spider-Man puts a spider-tracer on him. Spider-Man tracks the tracer to the waterfront. Dr Octopus attempts to destroy Spider-Man with an exploding dummy of himself, but Spider-Man is warned by his spider-sense and sets of the explosion with a web ball. He tracks Doctor Octopus down and paralyzes him with electricity long enough for the police to arrive.
17b	17b	"Magic Malice"	December 30, 1967	17
The Green Goblin escapes from Spider-Man as he plots to steal Blackwell's magic secrets and uses some magic tricks to rob various places. Spider-Man goes to Blackwell's house as the Goblin is planning to steal more secrets, but he is bound with chains and placed in a plastic container filling with water. However, he escapes with his web and learns from Blackwell's book of magic tricks how to get out of the chains before the Goblin returns. With the help of Blackwell, Spider-Man defeats his enemy.
18a	18a	"Fountain of Terror"	January 6, 1968	18
Peter hears that Dr Connor is missing once again. In Florida, Spider-Man fails to catch Harley Clivendon at Connor's laboratory when a boomerang knocks him out. With Billy he goes into the jungle though, Clivendon is also trying to find Connor. Spider-Man finds Connor being held prisoner in the old Spanish fort. Apparently, Connor has found the Fountain of Youth which a 15-century conquistador who may be Juan Ponce de León has been using. Clivendon is defeated by Spider-Man. Due to Connor's son Billy, a cannonball destroys the Fountain. The conquistador then flees.
18b	18b	"Fiddler on the Loose"	January 6, 1968	18
The Fiddler attacks Cyrus Flintridge III's band and fires sonic waves at Spider-Man from his violin, trying to exact a ransom of $1,000,000 from Flintridge while having voiced a dislike of rock music outdoing classical music. Later, he tries to get $5,000,000, but Spider-Man defeats him and Flintridge recognizes him as Otto.
19a	19a	"To Catch a Spider"	January 13, 1968	19
Dr Noah Boddy springs Electro, the Green Goblin, and the Vulture from prison so that they can all get revenge on Spider-Man. All three disable Spider-Man's powers and Electro tells Spider-Man to meet them at the docks at midnight. Spider-Man realizes Boddy helped the villains escape. At midnight he meets them at the docks and, using ventriloquism, makes the villains fight each other, leaving them knocked out. He webs up Boddy and the police arrest all of them.
19b	19b	"Double Identity"	January 13, 1968	19
Spider-Man attempts to catch a man looking like Peter Parker who steals a valuable manuscript, but the man's bodyguard Brutus knocks him down. The culprit is Charles Cameo who impersonates others while stealing art treasures. A trap is set by J. Jonah Jameson and the police with a Credenza tapestry, with Jameson thinking Spider-Man is responsible for the other thefts. Brutus knocks out the police officer who is delivering the tapestry and takes his place, while Cameo impersonates Spider-Man. Cameo and Brutus are apprehended by the real Spider-Man. Note: The moment where Spider-Man confronts Cameo impersonating him has since become an Internet meme.
20a	20a	"Sting of the Scorpion"	January 20, 1968	20
The Scorpion escapes prison through a tunnel to get back at J. Jonah Jameson and Spider-Man. The Scorpion drinks a toxic chemical to increase his strength and trashes Dr Stillwell's lab. The chemicals cause the Scorpion to grow into a giant. He captures Jameson, but Spider-Man is able to make the Scorpion drink the antidote that shrinks him down to normal size and webs him up for the police. Notes: Based on Amazing Spider-Man #29.
20b	20b	"Trick or Treachery"	January 20, 1968	20
The Human Flies, Stan and Lee Patterson, have been paroled from prison. They break into a vault and frame Spider-Man, with one of them disguising himself as him. They place a fly-tracer on him so they can commit crimes without being caught by him. However, Spider-Man finds the tracer and catches the twins.

=== Season 2 (1968–69) ===
After Grantray-Lawrence Animation went bankrupt, Krantz Animation, Inc. took over production for the second season of Spider-Man. Krantz Animation turned to Ralph Bakshi to take over executive producing and directing the series, which involved moving production to New York City. Bakshi wanted a series that "offered more attention to detail" and allowed "for a greater emphasis on character and plotline." Animation was performed by Clifford Augustson, Douglas Crane, and Frank Enders, among others, and Ira Turek, Lin Carter, and Fred Halliday were the writers.

Unlike the first-season episodes, all second-season episodes consisted of a single story.

List of Spider-Man season 2 episodes
No. overall	No. in season	Title	Original release date	Prod. code
21	1	"The Origin of Spider-Man"	September 14, 1968	21
Peter Parker is bitten by a radioactive spider and soon finds that he has gained the arachnid's proportionate abilities. He learns that "with great power there must also always be great responsibility" after his Uncle Ben, husband of his Aunt May, is murdered by a thief who he failed to stop earlier from robbing a T.V. station, as he felt it was not his problem. Spider-Man is able to catch the thief and decides to use his powers responsibly from then on.
22	2	"King Pinned"	September 21, 1968	22
With his beloved Uncle Ben dead and his Aunt May sick despite a new medicine, Peter decides that he must find a way to earn extra money to pay for May's medication. He applies for and gets a job at the Daily Bugle where he meets Betty Brant and J. Jonah Jameson for the first time. Peter later overhears a conversation between Jameson and a news source named Dr Omar about a drug counterfeiting ring run by the Kingpin. Peter discovers that this was the same ring that made the medicine Aunt May was taking. Peter also finds out that one of the Bugle's star reporters, Frederick Foswell, is actually the Kingpin's stooge. After finding out from Foswell that Jameson plans to write an expose' on the ring, the Kingpin and his men kidnap Jameson. Spider-Man follows the Kingpin to his lair and, despite being knocked out by gas from the Kingpin's cane and nearly unmasked, he rescues Jameson, but the Kingpin escapes. He learns that a time bomb had been set at the Bugle's printing presses. After a race against time, Spider-Man saves the Bugle, the exposé is written and the Kingpin's drug counterfeiting ring is put out of business.
23	3	"Swing City"	September 28, 1968	23
A mad scientist called the Master Technician (re-named the Radiation Specialist in a later episode) takes control of a nuclear reactor and demands $10,000,000, amnesty and permission to build his own reactor. When this is refused, the Specialist uses it to create an anti-gravity field that lifts the entire island of Manhattan into the stratosphere, now holding the city for ransom for $100,000,000, the reactor, and amnesty. Peter reluctantly breaks his date to save the city before the Specialist sends it crashing down. He moves under the city to get into the reactor. Anti-radiation used by the Specialist weakens Spider-Man, but he is able to regain enough strength to defeat him.
24	4	"Criminals in the Clouds"	October 5, 1968	24
To impress a girl and to show up his rival, star quarterback Roy Robinson, Peter Parker decides to try out for his high school football team feeling that he could be a star player with his spider-powers. The coach scoffs at Peter, but offers him a job as the waterboy. Meanwhile, the airborne criminal known as the Skymaster hatches a plan to kidnap Roy Robinson, who just happens to be the son of a well-known scientist that has invented an invisibility serum, and hold him for ransom. At night the Skymaster's men break into the house, gas Roy and take him to their flying base. After learning of this plot during a team practice, Peter changes into Spider-Man and tries to tracks down the Skymaster to his airship. He sees one of the clouds is not moving and finds the airship hidden inside. Once inside the vessel, he rescues Roy Robinson after defeating Skymaster and his goons, causing their ship to crash into the harbor. Spidey returns Robinson in time for the big football game and helps him win due to his arms not working from being bound up. However, poor Peter gets fired from his waterboy job for not being at the game as Roy Robinson gets both the glory and the girl.
25	5	"Menace from the Bottom of the World"	October 12, 1968	25
Peter Parker is sent by J. Jonah Jameson to investigate claims by a seismologist that he has detected subterranean voices in an unknown language. Peter reluctantly carries out the assignment after seeing a rival reporter getting the plum job of investigating the disappearance of a bank. Upon hearing the underground voice transmissions at the seismology lab, Peter uses his spider-hearing to determine that these were the people responsible for making the bank disappear and they are plotting to take another one. Quickly donning his Spider-Man costume, Peter races to the next bank to be taken and sees the bank disappear into the ground. Spider-Man descends thousands of feet into the sinkhole left by the bank to investigate. He soon discovers the bank in a strange underground city inhabited by hairy, ape-like humanoids called Molemen. Their leader sends the Molemen at Spider-Man, but he evades them and seizes their leader. He discovers he is an escaped criminal called Mugs Reily who tunneled his way out of prison and has disguised himself as a Moleman to become their leader. When unmasked, the angry Molemen turn against him and the banks are lifted back to the surface.
26	6	"Diamond Dust"	October 19, 1968	26
After years of being dismissed as a bookworm, Peter Parker is trying to win a spot as a relief pitcher on his college baseball team. Together with Artie, the team's catcher and Pete's school chum, he changes into his suit and tie before heading off to the local zoo to meet up with some friends. But at that very moment, a group of museum robbers led by the master criminal known as Shakespeare create a diversion by unlocking a zoo cage and letting loose a monstrous gorilla who goes on a rampage, putting the visitors in great danger. Peter hears of the gorilla's escape over a car radio and dashes to an alley where he changes into Spider-Man. After a fierce battle, Spidey re-captures the ape by knocking it into the seal enclosure, averting a disaster. But later, during a baseball game, the robbers don gorilla suits to rob the college museum of a baseball-sized diamond worth a fortune. Waiting for his chance to get off the bench and onto the pitcher's mound, Peter is sent to collect a fly ball that has been hit out of the stands. But after he locates the ball, a stunned Peter is confronted by a terrified professor who tells him that "apes" have taken over the museum. Instantly figuring out the robbers' plot, Peter discards his baseball uniform and swings to the museum as Spider-Man, where he sees the criminals. However one of the criminals shoots through his web, knocking Spider-Man to the ground. Shakespeare uses a weapon filled with "liquid latex" against him, but Spidey counters with his wits (and a suit of armor) to defeat Shakespeare and his henchmen. Hopping back into his baseball uniform, Peter returns to the field just in time to throw the last winning pitch and win the game.
27	7	"Spider-Man Battles the Molemen"	October 26, 1968	27
Peter goes underground again, seeing the same scenery as in "Menace from the Bottom of the World." The building he is in is taken underground by the Molemen, who want to eliminate him before they invade the surface world. He meets a race of dwarves and a giant while underground, but escapes from both of them. This time, the Molemen's leader appears to be a genuine Moleman and is called the Mole. Spider-Man captures the Mole and forces him to order the buildings to be returned. The Mole then accidentally destroys his machinery when firing a gun at Spider-Man, causing an explosion, but Spider-Man swings out of the tunnels in time.
28	8	"Phantom from the Depths of Time"	November 2, 1968	28
Spider-Man tries to stop an evil alien named Dr Manta who has enslaved an island's populace with robot beetles and plans to use them to mine a mineral from the island. One of them sends a distress signal which Spider-Man picks up. He battles the robot beetles before he encounters Dr Manta, who activates the Mountain Monster. However, Spider-Man destroys it and frees the people. Note: This episode re-uses Rocket Robin Hood backgrounds and villains.
29	9	"The Evil Sorcerer"	November 9, 1968	29
Kotep the Scarlet Sorcerer, an ancient magician frozen in time by a rival sorcerer, is brought back to life in the present day by a college professor who has just been fired and wanting revenge on his former bosses. Kotep scoffs at the professor's commands that he take revenge on his enemies and responds by summoning a green-skinned demon to attack him. A group of students happen upon the professor as he is being struck down. Peter Parker is among them and feigning cowardice, ducks behind a pillar where he changes into his Spider-Man costume. Now in his true colors, Spidey battles the cackling sorcerer and his demon slave, but Kotep manages to escape. Later, the hospitalized professor reveals the secret of Kotep's power in the form of his scepter, to some of his students who promptly try to warn Spider-Man, while Kotep has other ideas. Bent on conquering the world, the resurrected magician summons an army of demons who promise to follow him if he defeats Spider-Man. Spider-Man finds a giant spider web, but it is a trap which transports him away. He ends up at Kotep's castle. Faced with powerful thousands-of-years-old magic, Spider-Man must find a way to stop one of the most powerful villains he has ever encountered. He finally defeats the sorcerer by taking away his scepter and destroying it.
30	10	"Vine"	November 16, 1968	30
After inadvertently unleashing a giant plant on the city from a seed he found in the house of a missing scientist, Peter Parker travels back in time to 3,000,000 B.C. in order to find the professor himself. Spotting a great stone city in the distance, Peter quickly doffs his school clothes to reveal the costume of Spider-Man and, after a battle with an amphibious monster, is captured by a tribe of primitive blue giants. Taken prisoner to the city, Spidey discovers that the professor has become the benevolent ruler of giants and asks for help. The scientist reveals he destroyed the plants with radium. He explains that the only way to stop the menace is to steal radium gems from the temple of an evil society of intelligent plant monsters, which were mutated by its radiation and captured the city from its original inhabitants, the blue giants. Spider-Man is knocked out by the plants and put in an arena with 'Goliath', a giant caterpillar-like monster, for the amusement of the Master Vine. After a brief battle, Spider-Man webs up the beast, defeats the plant soldiers and takes the radium gems, which are in the eyes of a huge idol. The plants, dependent on the radiation for survival, wither away. Having returned the prehistoric city to its rightful owners, Spider-Man returns to the present and feeds the radium gems to the rampaging giant plant. Unable to absorb so much energy at once, it too withers away, saving the city from destruction.
31	11	"Pardo Presents"	November 23, 1968	31
While on a date with his girlfriend Polly to see the premiere of "Pardo Productions Presents: My Pet" (along with well-to-do socialites and city officials), Peter Parker becomes entangled in a robbery plot by a villain named Pardo who possesses the strange ability to transform himself into pure energy – while taking the form of an enormous black cat. Everybody in the audience is quickly gassed and left hypnotized by a large eye that appears on the theater screen. Only Peter manages to resist the attack due to his spider-powers. With the rest of the patrons staring helplessly at the screen ahead, the mild-mannered college boy peels off his suit and tie to reveal the fighting togs of Spider-Man. Pardo's goons start robbing the audience of their valuables until Spidey intervenes. He enters the giant eye and is trapped in a water tower, but he cuts his way out. The wall-crawler leads Pardo on a chase across New York to a showdown atop the Brooklyn Bridge. Once there, the giant black cat is electrocuted, leaving only Pardo's clothes behind.
32	12	"Cloud City of Gold"	November 30, 1968	32
While in South America as an exchange student, Peter Parker and his professor are flying in a plane over the Andes Mountains during a lightning storm when the plane crashes. The professor, the pilot and the plane's crew all survive, but there is no sign of Peter. Just as they notice that they are trapped in a hostile jungle with dangerous natives watching their every move, none other than Spider-Man comes swinging to the rescue. After building a raft to escape the natives, Spider-Man leads them into an underground river after getting caught in a whirlpool. While underground, Spider-Man fights vampire bats using whistling to mess up their sonar. After finally coming out of the cave, they finally see the Cloud City of Gold, which is ruled by a 15th-century conquistador named DeVargas, who attacks them with a giant eagle made of gold. As Spider-Man battles the flying monster, the professor and the crew are captured by DeVargas. Spider-Man makes the eagle crash into an icy mountain, causing it to freeze and shatter. Spider-Man then finds himself facing a large spider with its web in the mouth of a volcano, which he also defeats. DeVargas then tries to do Spider-Man in by firing a cannon at him while he remains inside the volcano, causing an eruption. Spider-Man frees his companions and they all escape the Cloud City right before the entire volcano containing the city erupts. Back at the crash site, Spider-Man disappears and the professor and crew find Peter waiting for them. They are finally rescued by helicopter.
33	13	"Neptune's Nose Cone"	December 7, 1968	33
Peter Parker is sent to Antarctica on assignment by J. Jonah Jameson to track down and get pictures of a lunar module that crashed in the South Pole after a failed launch. Peter, along with Penny, the pilot of the Daily Bugle plane, crash land in a blizzard on an island. Upon waking up, Peter finds that Penny had been captured by natives with the intent of offering her, along with the nose cone of the module, as a sacrifice to their volcano god in exchange for warmth. He changes into his costume and, as Spider-Man, must not only must rescue Penny but also stop the natives from throwing the nose cone into the volcano as the resulting explosion would destroy the entire island. After battling the natives and many strange creatures (including a giant winged snake) in a cavern, Spider-Man escapes the cavern by pushing aside a statue. Spider-Man averts catastrophe by webbing the nose cone before it can fall in. He rescues Penny when she is knocked into the volcano and allows the nose cone to take off again. The nose cone's rocket engines cause a small volcanic eruption, giving heat to the island and calming the natives down. They unbend the plane's propellers and allow Peter and Penny to return to New York. Peter then gives Jameson an egg from the island, which hatches into a baby winged snake that bites Jameson on the nose.
34	14	"Home"	December 14, 1968	34
While unwinding at a club, Peter Parker meets a girl named Carol who is, surprisingly, as interested in science as he is. After setting up a date, Peter decides to patrol the town as Spider-Man and stumbles upon a robbery perpetrated by...Carol! But things start to look fishy when Carol starts using the same spider-powers as Spider-Man. Spider-Man follows her as she and other spider-men enter inside a spaceship that races back to their headquarters inside a cave, but is captured. He discovers from Carol's father that they are from an alien civilization that crash landed on Earth and have been living underground waiting to be saved by a ray from their home planet. He finds out she was stealing equipment to try to stop a proton device test which would have destroyed the civilization, as the people are susceptible to proton rays, they cannot go near it. Spider-Man is able to stop the device going off just before the ray takes them back home.
35	15	"Blotto"	December 21, 1968	35
A former film producer named Clive creates a dark creature named Blotto, similar to the Blob, on a special movie screen, then brings it to life with a weapon he calls the Spirit-Scope, which turns living things into film-paper and brings things on film to life. The creature quickly asserts an ability to engulf and erase any object it wants, from garbage cans and skyscrapers to Peter Parker's car as he drives a famous movie actress to an appearance at his university. After getting her to safety on a nearby roof, Peter turns into Spider-Man. The webbed wonder tries to find a way to defeat this mysterious menace before it destroys the entire city. Clive contacts the military and orders them to surrender the city to him. Temporarily paralyzing Blotto with electricity, Spider-Man finds Clive. He tries to hit Spider-Man with the Spirit-Scope, but instead hits his assistant Colin. He tries again on Spider-Man, apparently paralyzing him. But when Clive goes to examine him, Spider-Man punches him and gets the Spirit-Scope. Going out to face a renewed Blotto, he swings at the now-monstrous creature, and just before impact, fires the Spirit-Scope at it. Blotto turns back into harmless film-paper just as Spider-Man swings through it. Clive and Colin are then arrested by the police.
36	16	"Thunder Rumble"	December 28, 1968	36
Spider-Man fights Bolton, a Martian warrior who can form and hurl lightning bolts and plans to take Earth's gold. He comes to Earth, but is webbed up by Spider-Man, only to be freed by the criminal Boomer. Spider-Man tricks Bolton into sending himself into space again using one of his lightning bolts and captures Boomer. Note: This episode's villain should not be confused with the Mighty Thor, a Marvel superhero.
37	17	"Spider-Man Meets Skyboy"	January 4, 1969	37
While being honored at an awards ceremony, foremost scientist Dr Caldwell is kidnapped by the evil Dr Zapp in front of many onlookers, including Caldwell's teenaged son Jan who wants his latest invention called the Astro-Helmet. Feeling that the police are powerless to find his father, Jan decides to strike out on his own, using the Astro-Helmet and a suit invented by his father. While patrolling the city from the air, Jan is spotted by Spider-Man who gives chase and confronts him. Spider-Man later realizes that this "Skyboy" is the son of the scientist from the now well-publicized kidnapping and helps Jan to rescue the boy's father from Dr Zapp's laboratory on Lightning Mountain. Jan is knocked down by Zapp's lightning-emitting antenna, though Spider-Man saves him. Zapp captures Spider-Man and takes the Astro-Helmet. However, Spider-Man defeats him by using the flash bulb of his camera to blind him after he removes his goggles (causing him to back up into his own equipment, electrocuting him) and escapes with Jan and Caldwell before Zapp's lab explodes.
38	18	"Cold Storage"	January 11, 1969	38
After robbing a jewelry store, the crooked Dr Cool and a henchman are tracked to their hideout by the web-slinger. Spider-Man defeats Cool's henchman, but is knocked out by Dr Cool's cane shooting the top off. Dr Cool ties him up and puts him in a deep freeze unit along with the stolen diamonds where he blacks out and is frozen solid. After a time, the power to the deep freeze runs down and the wall-crawler awakens to find that decades have passed and the world is in ruins. After battling cavemen and various prehistoric animals, including a Pteranodon, a woolly mammoth and a Tyrannosaurus, Spider-Man realizes it was all a hallucination after being rescued by a friendly ice delivery man on his rounds. Later, Dr Cool and his henchman return to their hideout after another heist only to be defeated and captured by Spider-Man when he dumps a large load of ice on them.
39	19	"To Cage a Spider"	January 18, 1969	39
Spider-Man tracks two crooks who robbed a bank and gives chase as the criminals escape in a getaway car. During the chase, one of the crooks hurls a vibrator at Spider-Man as he swoops in to capture them. As the robbers escape, Spider-Man plummets twenty stories to the ground. While lying unconscious on the street, Spider-Man is rescued from a gathering mob by Captain Ned Stacy and taken to a prison infirmary. Upon waking up, Spider-Man discovers a group of convicts attempting a breakout and that they have taken Captain Stacy as a hostage. The crooks attack Spider-Man, but he defeats them and pretends he wants to help the criminals escape. Spider-Man turns off the prison lights, then squashes the breakout by picking the criminals off one by one. He swings down and defeats the criminal holding Stacy. Stacy offers to testify at Spider-Man's trial, but Spider-Man leaves the prison.

=== Season 3 (1970) ===
Krantz Animation, Inc. continued to produce the third season of Spider-Man, with Ralph Bakshi continuing as executive producer and director of the series. Other crew from the second season also carried on through Spider-Man's third season.

The third-season episodes consisted of a mix of episodes with two story segments per half-hour, and single episode-length stories.

List of Spider-Man season 3 episodes
No. overall	No. in season	Title	Original release date	Prod. code
40a	1a	"The Winged Thing"	March 22, 1970	40
A new story involving the Vulture. After Spider-Man spots the Vulture robbing a millionaire's penthouse the Vulture warns people to stay off the streets, then escapes from Spider-Man on a building site. He then steals a missile planned to bring him down, then a sonic device to control the minds of vultures, but he is again defeated when his vulture army turns against him. Note: This episode uses footage from the two first-season episodes "The Sky Is Falling" and "The Vulture's Prey", featuring the Vulture.
40b	1b	"Conner's Reptiles"	March 22, 1970	40
A new story involving an alligator given superhuman intelligence by Dr Conner's experiments who has kidnapped him and wants to rule the swamps. The alligator plans to give the serum to other reptiles. Spider-Man uses the serum to defeat the alligator. Note: This episode uses footage from the first-season episode "Where Crawls the Lizard."
41a	2a	"Trouble With Snow"	March 29, 1970	41
Spider-Man takes on a gigantic living snowman brought to life by chemical reactions and an electric charge that grows larger after every snowfall. Peter is sent to take photos of the snowman by J. Jonah Jameson. He fights it, but it is so cold that it freezes his web. He uses a copper cable to drain the snowman of its electricity and melts it.
41b	2b	"Spider-Man vs. Desperado"	March 29, 1970	41
Spider-Man battles Desperado, a cowboy riding a flying electronic horse and using hypnotic guns to commit bank robberies. He finally gets him away from his horse after using J. Jonah Jameson to set a trap and webs him up.
42a	3a	"Sky Harbor"	April 5, 1970	42
Baron von Rantenraven commands Sky Harbor, a gigantic airborne fortress crewed by sky pirates who use biplanes and an immobilizing dust cloud to capture jumbo jets and airliners. He starts attacking New York City in World War I planes. Spider-Man is called upon by the unnamed Mayor of New York City to defeat this flying menace. He tricks them with a mirror, makes the Baron's plane crash into one of the zeppelins holding up Sky Harbor, and brings it down. It was mentioned that Baron von Rantenraven and his men are in police custody.
42b	3b	"The Big Brainwasher"	April 5, 1970	42
Mary Jane Watson gets hired as a go-go girl at a new nightclub in Times Square where she is instructed to occasionally take pictures of the city officials in attendance for the club's grand opening which really gives them an urge to visit the back room. Mary Jane invites Peter Parker to her debut. While Mary Jane dances, Peter uncovers a plot to use mind control on the city officials using a powerful device by none other than the Kingpin. Spider-Man gets involved, but is chained in a room filling with water. However, he uses a web bubble in order to breathe. Spider-Man foils the plan, saving Mary Jane and the city officials, and defeats the Kingpin and his henchmen. Note: This is the episode with the one and only appearance of Mary Jane Watson in the entire original Spider-Man series.
43a	4a	"The Vanishing Doctor Vespasian"	April 12, 1970	43
A mad scientist named Dr Vespasian creates an invisibility serum, which he tests on his dog Brutus before using it on himself, and hatches a nefarious scheme to destroy Spider-Man to demonstrate his power to the city's criminals. However, Spider-Man defeats the invisible Brutus. Vespasian attempts to rob jewels from a bank, but is defeated when Spider-Man drops several kinds of ice cream onto him.
43b	4b	"The Scourge of the Scarf"	April 12, 1970	43
Working with his gang, a thief known as the Scarf uses several imaginative techniques with illusions to rob from the rich people of New York City. They then attempt to rob a museum with laughing gas and escape through the chute, but Spider-Man has alerted the police who see the chute and are able to catch the gang as Spider-Man defeats the Scarf at the same time.
44a	5a	"Super Swami"	April 19, 1970	44
An evil swami uses illusions to create chaos in the city, like causing a bridge to apparently disappear with mass hypnosis and causing a snowstorm just by blowing. Somehow, Spider-Man ends up in his crystal ball. However, he escapes and sees dry ice, which he realizes caused the snowstorm. He finally encounters the swami, who tries to shoot him. He is captured by Spider-Man, who exposes him as a fraud, knocks him into a river, and has him arrested by the police.
44b	5b	"The Birth of Micro Man"	April 19, 1970	44
A mad scientist named Professor Pretorius escapes from prison and plots widespread devastation with a nuclear weapon that he calls "The Kingdom Come Machine." While on the run from police, the snickering villain gets a ride from Peter Parker, who is returning home from a college party. But after dropping off the scientist on a road near his laboratory, Peter hears a news report that Pretorius is an escaped criminal and that he has been seen with a "youthful accomplice." Realizing that he has also become a wanted man, Peter changes into Spider-Man before returning to the lab to do battle with Pretorius. One problem that Spider-Man encounters while trying to foil his plans is that Pretorius also has a way to shrink himself in size and Spider-Man has to undergo the same process to fight him. He is chased by a cat, but escapes through a hole and finds Pretorius with a miniature atomic pile. Spider-Man ends up using water to cool the Kingdom Come Machine, breaking it down, before delivering Professor Pretorius to the police and clearing Peter's name.
45a	6a	"Knight Must Fall"	April 26, 1970	45
Spider-Man must face off against Sir Galahad, a villainous knight on a motorcycle with an electrified lance who has gone on a crime spree, all the while avoiding bad press from J. Jonah Jameson. Galahad first stops a robbery, then takes the money himself. Spider-Man defeats him in a joust when he tries to steal a sword which belonged to King Arthur, knocking him into the waterfront.
45b	6b	"The Devious Dr Dumpty"	April 26, 1970	45
Spider-Man fights Dr Humperdink Dumpty, a Falstaffian criminal who uses balloon-themed devices, at a town parade when they rob an actress. However, they escape in a balloon and knock Spider-Man off. Though Spider-Man is saved by landing on a giant balloon in his own likeness. He later captures them when they try robbing a soiree using laughing gas.
46	7	"Up from Nowhere"	May 3, 1970	46
Dr Atlantean of the fabled Atlantis attacks New York City. The army is unable to stop him and he uses advanced technology to cover Manhattan in a giant dome and sink it beneath the ocean as part of a plan to help the Atlanteans invade and only Spider-Man can stop him. Spider-Man is taken inside their submarine. However, he tricks Dr Atlantean into firing at the panel, bringing the city up again despite the threat to pop the dome, and webs up Dr Atlantean. The Mayor of New York City asks Spider-Man to help him get re-elected. Note: This episode features elements from "Swing City" and depicts Dr Atlantean as a redrawn version of the Radiation Specialist.
47	8	"Rollarama"	May 10, 1970	47
When the city and its adjacent missile site are threatened by giant, rolling seed pods from another dimension, Peter Parker enters a mysterious portal to their point of origin to find a way to stop them. He is knocked out by a large creature and captured by a society of blue giants. They reveal that their world is becoming too cold for them. He finds himself the target of another society of intelligent plants, who are keeping the environment cool with a device powered by radium. He takes the radium, causing the plants to wither, then uses the radium to destroy the rolling pods. Note: This episode is a remake of "Vine" with some differences.
48a	9a	"Rhino"	May 17, 1970	48
The Rhino plans to make another golden statue of himself. The Rhino attacks the last shipment of gold, despite torpedoes, but Spider-Man captures him when he tries escaping through the sewers. Note: This episode uses footage from the two first-season episodes "Horn of the Rhino" and "The Golden Rhino."
48b	9b	"The Madness of Mysterio"	May 17, 1970	48
Mysterio tricks Spider-Man into thinking he has been shrunk to six inches tall while trapping him in an abandoned amusement park after threatening to destroy the city. He knocks Spider-Man out and uses a post-hypnotic suggestion to make Spider-Man think that Mysterio is a giant. Spider-Man realizes his plot, finds Mysterio in the parachute jump ride, and webs him up. Note: Mysterio is not in his usual outfit and his civilian appearance is depicted with red hair, eyeglasses and green skin.
49	10	"Revolt in the Fifth Dimension"	May 24, 1970	49
An alien scientist escapes his homeplanet Gorth's destruction by Infinata with the knowledge of the entire planet condensed into a palm-sized orb. Escaping by spacecraft, the scientist heads to Earth. After Spider-Man catches the ship in his hand, the tiny alien scientist communicates using mental telepathy. After giving Spider-Man the Library orb, the alien dies. Spider-Man, aware of the danger to our galaxy, decides to take the library to government authorities. However, Infinata takes Spider-Man into the Fifth Dimension, where he is interrogated as to the whereabouts of the Library. Spider-Man flees, but is quickly re-captured. Spider-Man makes one last attempt to fight back, then he discovers Infinata's secret. Only fear makes Infinata powerful and Dementia Five is an illusion. Spider-Man closes his eyes and leaves the Fifth Dimension. Note 1: Seven minutes of footage are taken directly from the "Dementia Five" episode of Rocket Robin Hood. The story simply substitutes Spider-Man for the Rocket Robin Hood characters, note that all the other characters and backgrounds, as well as the plot and much of the dialogue, are taken wholly from "Dementia Five." Note 2: ABC never aired "Revolt in the Fifth Dimension" with the rest of the third season, possibly because of the incidence of death, spatial creepiness, and great psychedelia in that episode. ABC aired "Sting of the Scorpion/Trick or Treachery" in its place.
50	11	"Specialists and Slaves"	May 31, 1970	50
The Radiation Specialist has been released from prison. He knocks out the guards at the nuclear reactor and gets inside. He lures Spider-Man away from the city with a robot car that triggers a microphone making Spider-Man think someone is being kidnapped. The Specialist levitates Manhattan island once more and uses another form of radiation to take control of most of the city's minds, except for a few strong minds and a few criminal minds. Spider-Man is arrested, but Captain Stacy, who was able to stay free of the mind control, prevents the Specialist from being informed. Some criminals however attempt a breakout using Stacy as a hostage. Spider-Man rescues Stacy, then defeats the Specialist. Note: This episode re-uses footage from the two second-season episodes "Swing City" and "To Cage a Spider." Note 2 Dr Atlantean (See "Up from Nowhere") appears in long shot in one scene. His head fin and pointed ears are clearly visible.
51	12	"Down to Earth"	June 7, 1970	51
A meteorite crashes on an island. Parker and Osa crash their plane in a storm. The natives attempt to throw Osa and the meteorite into a volcano. Spider-Man tries to stop this with web-lines and the meteorite is revealed to contain a spaceship. Note: This uses footage from the second-season episode "Neptune's Nose Cone."
52	13	"Trip to Tomorrow"	June 14, 1970	52
In this clip show Spider-Man, after falling inside a box car, narrates tales of his adventures to a boy who is running away to Podunk and wants to be a superhero. Hearing of the danger, the boy leaves the car as the train starts leaving, saying that his mother will not even let him cross the street. As he leaves, Spider-Man laughs. Note: This episode uses footage from the first-season episode "Return of the Flying Dutchman" and the two second-season episodes "Thunder Rumble" and "The Evil Sorcerer."
