= Marvel Zombies: Red Band =

Comic book series by Marvel Comics

Publication information
- Publisher: Marvel Comics
- Schedule: Monthly
- Format: Limited series
- Genre: Horror; Superhero; Zombie apocalypse
- Publication date: September 17, 2025 – January 28, 2026
- No. of issues: 5

Creative team
- Written by: Ethan S. Parker; Griffin Sheridan
- Artist: Jan Bazaldua

Marvel Zombies: Red Band is an American comic book published by Marvel Comics under the Red Band line. It is an installment in the comic book metaseries Marvel Zombies. The five-issue limited series–written by Ethan S. Parker and Griffin Sheridan, and illustrated by Jan Bazaldua–began publication on September 17, 2025, and concluded on January 28, 2026. Marvel Zombies: Red Band depicts a "what if" scenario in which the cosmic rays that gave the Fantastic Four their superpowers also turned them into zombies, leading to an apocalypse involving the rest of the superheroes and villains of the Marvel Universe.

== Plot ==
During an unauthorized spaceflight, astronauts Reed Richards, Sue Storm, Ben Grimm, and Johnny Storm are exposed to cosmic rays that not only grant them superpowers but also transform them into zombies. Upon returning to Earth, the four's hunger for human flesh urges them to attack the population of New York City, either by devouring or infecting people. The four are confronted by a group of superheroes–consisting of Iron Man, Hulk, Thor, and Daredevil–and they fight until Thor is killed, causing both sides to retreat. The four decide to form a team that Johnny dubs the "Frightful Four". Meanwhile, the zombies' rampage leaves teenage Peter Parker, who is secretly the superhero Spider-Man, paralyzed with fear and unable to use his superpowers to save his Aunt May and Uncle Ben from being devoured. Consumed by guilt, Peter understands that "with great power comes great responsibility". In outer space, the Silver Surfer notices that the stars around him are disappearing.

At Xavier's School for Gifted Youngsters, newcomer Jean Grey is greeted by founder Charles Xavier and the rest of the student body, composed of Scott Summers, Hank McCoy, Warren Worthington III, and Bobby Drake. That night, Jean dreams of being attacked by a zombie version of the X-Men, and wakes up face to face with a zombie Summers. She kills him in self-defense and finds the rest of the school empty and in ruins. Some time later, Jean has been using her mutant abilities as a masked vigilante to fight zombies and help survivors on a zombie-ravaged Earth. She encounters fellow vigilantes Spider-Man and Jewel just as they, along with the Avengers—Iron Man, Daredevil, Captain America, She-Hulk, Doctor Octopus, and Ultron—are transported by an unseen, near-omnipotent entity called the Beyonder to a planet called Battleworld. There, the Beyonder pits them against a group of superpowered zombies consisting of the Frightful Four, a now-infected Hulk, Doctor Doom, Hawkeye, Hobgoblin, and the Enforcers (Fancy Dan, Montana, and Ox). Throughout the battle, Johnny, Hobgoblin, and the Enforcers are killed, while Daredevil and Jean are infected.

A Phoenix Force-powered Jean infects Iron Man and Captain America, while Spider-Man, Jewel, and Doctor Octopus manage to escape her.

== Publication history ==
In June 2025, Marvel Comics announced a five-issue comic book limited series titled Marvel Zombies: Red Band as part of the publisher's Red Band line, with Ethan S. Parker and Griffin Sheridan as writers, and Jan Bazaldua as artist. The series adapts several crossover events from Marvel Comics, including "Secret Wars" (1984–85), "Civil War" (2006–07), and "King in Black" (2020). Marvel Zombies: Red Band began publication on September 17, 2025, and concluded on January 28, 2026.

=== Issues ===
Issue	Publication date	Ref.
#1	September 17, 2025	
#2	October 22, 2025	
#3	November 26, 2025	
#4	December 31, 2025	
#5	January 28, 2026	
