= Doug Braithwaite =

British comic book artist

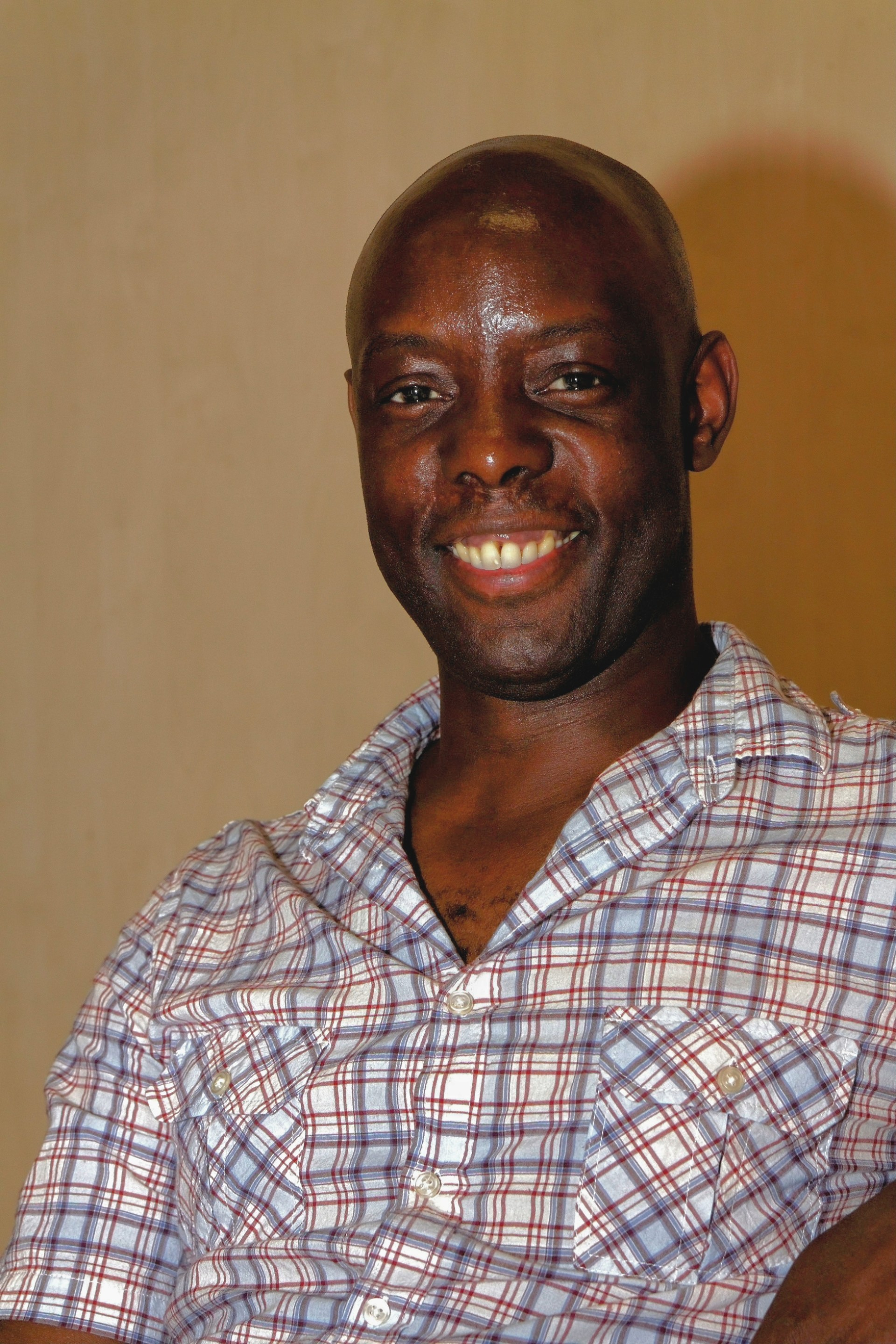
- Braithwaite in 2011
- Areas: Penciller, Inker
- Notable works: Justice; Universe X Paradise X Punisher

Doug Braithwaite is a British comic book artist.

== Career ==
Braithwaite began his career working in the British comics industry starting with 2000 AD and A1; later he worked on Marvel's Earth X sequels, Universe X and Paradise X (with Alex Ross and Jim Krueger). His other works under Marvel include The Punisher Kills the Marvel Universe and Punisher: MAX #13–18, with Garth Ennis.

He had been exclusively contracted at DC, but in 2008 he announced that when his contract deal ended he would sign as an exclusive artist with Marvel for three years with his first project being Secret Invasion: Thor with writer Matt Fraction. While at DC he worked with Alex Ross and Jim Krueger again on the twelve-issue limited series JUSTICE, providing pencils and layouts.

In addition, he has illustrated issues of Ghost for Dark Horse Comics, Archer & Armstrong, for Valiant Comics, and Conan the Barbarian for Titan Comics. In 2008 he illustrated a four issue run on The Brave and the Bold with David Hine.

In April 2011 Braithwaite was one of 62 comics creators who appeared at the IGN stage at the Kapow! convention in London to set two Guinness World Records, the Fastest Production of a Comic Book, and Most Contributors to a Comic Book. With Guinness officials on hand to monitor their progress, writer Mark Millar began work at 9am scripting a 20-page black and white Superior comic book, with Braithwaite and the other artists appearing on stage throughout the day to work on the pencils, inks, and lettering, including Dave Gibbons, Frank Quitely, John Romita Jr., Jock, Ian Churchill, Olivier Coipel, Duncan Fegredo, Simon Furman, David Lafuente, John McCrea, Sean Phillips and Liam Sharp, who all drew a panel each, with regular Superior artist Leinil Yu creating the book's front cover. The book was completed in 11 hours, 19 minutes, and 38 seconds, and was published through Icon on 23 November 2011, with all royalties being donated to Yorkhill Children's Foundation.

=== Critical reception ===
Braithwaite's art on Journey into Mystery during the 2011 "Fear Itself" storyline was widely acclaimed.

== Bibliography ==
=== 2000 AD ===
- Tyranny Rex: "Systems of Romance" (with John Smith, 2000 AD Sci-Fi Special 1989)
- Judge Hershey: "True Brit" (with Alan Grant, Judge Dredd Mega Special 1989)
- Judge Dredd:
  - "Lockin' Up the House" (with Alan Grant, in 2000 AD No. 619, 1989)
  - "Confessions of a Rottweiller " (with John Wagner, in 2000 AD #648–649, 1989)
- Rogue Trooper (Friday): "Gaia" (with Steve White, Rogue Trooper Action Special, 1996)

=== DC Comics ===
- Doom Patrol No. 25 (with Grant Morrison, DC Comics, 1987)
- Legion of Super-Heroes Annual No. 1 (DC Comics, 1990)
- Batman: Legends of the Dark Knight #80–82 (Feb–May 1996)
- Azrael #29–30 "Angel Errant" (with Dennis O'Neil, DC Comics, 1997)
- The Flash Annual No. 12 (DC Comics, 1999)
- Supermen of America #1–5 (DC Comics, 2000)
- Justice #1–12 (with Alex Ross, DC Comics, 2007)
- The Flash No. 231 (DC Comics, 2007)
- Green Arrow #118–137 (DC Comics, 1998)
- The Brave and the Bold #19–22 (with David Hine, DC Comics, 2008–2009, forthcoming)
- Shadowpact No. 17 DC Comics, (2007)

==== Covers ====
- Batman: Legends of the Dark Knight #80–82 (DC Comics, 1996)
- Batman and the Outsiders #1-present (DC Comics, 2007-ongoing)

=== Image Comics ===
- Storm Dogs #1–6 (with David Hine, 2012-2013)

=== Marvel Comics ===
- Captain America (with Mark Waid, Marvel Comics)
- Incredible Hulk #66–76 (Marvel Comics, 2004)
- Punisher #64-75 (Marvel Comics, 1987)
- Punisher #13–18 (Marvel Comics, 2005)
- Secret Invasion: Thor (with Matt Fraction, 3-issue miniseries, 2008)
- "Survivors" (with Rob Williams, in X-Men: Curse of the Mutants – X-Men vs. Vampires No. 1, 2-issue mini-series, Marvel Comics, September 2010)
- Journey into Mystery #622–626 (Marvel Comics, 2011)

==== Covers ====
- Punisher: #64-74, Armory #4–7

=== Titan Comics ===
- Conan the Barbarian (2023) #5-8

=== Valiant Comics ===
- Operation: Stormbreaker #1 (Acclaim Comics, 1997)
- Unity #1-4 (Valiant Entertainment, 2013-2014)
- Armor Hunters #1-4 (Valiant Entertainment, 2014)
- Imperium #1-4 (Valiant Entertainment, 2015)
- Book of Death #1-4 (Valiant Entertainment, 2015)
- Book of Death: The Fall of Bloodshot #1 (Valiant Entertainment, 2015)
- Ninjak #10-13 (Valiant Entertainment, 2015-2016)
- 4001 A.D.: Bloodshot #1 (Valiant Entertainment, 2016)
- Bloodshot U.S.A. #1-4 (Valiant Entertainment, 2016)
- X-O Manowar 2017 (Volume 4) #4-6 (Valiant Entertainment, 2017)
