= Justice (DC Comics) =

Comic book limited series by Alex Ross and Jim Krueger

- Cover to the Absolute Justice hardcover edition (2009), art by Alex Ross.

Publication information
- Publisher: DC Comics
- Schedule: Bimonthly
- Format: Limited series
- Genre: Superhero
- Publication date: August 2005 – June 2007
- No. of issues: 12
- Main character(s): Justice League of America; Legion of Doom

Creative team
- Created by: Alex Ross; Jim Krueger; Doug Braithwaite

Collected editions
- Volume 1: ISBN 1-4012-0969-6
- Volume 2: ISBN 1-4012-1206-9
- Volume 3: ISBN 1-4012-1467-3
- Absolute: ISBN 1401224156

Justice is a twelve-issue American comic book limited series published bimonthly by DC Comics from August 2005 through June 2007, written by Alex Ross and Jim Krueger, with art also by Ross and Doug Braithwaite. Its story involves the superhero team known as the Justice League of America as they confront the supervillain team the Legion of Doom, led by Lex Luthor and Brainiac, one of the greatest enemies of Superman, and after every supervillain is motivated by a shared dream that seems to be a vision of the planet's destruction, which they intend to avoid.

== Development ==
After releasing their previous project, Earth X for Marvel Comics, Alex Ross, Jim Krueger, and Doug Braithwaite started developing JUSTICE, a 12-issue bi-monthly series. All layouts and pencils were provided by Braithwaite, then painted over by Ross. Ross described the series as a full-on superhero war, the Super Friends versus the Legion of Doom, to the death.

== Plot ==
Several supervillains start having recurring nightmares where Earth is destroyed by a nuclear armageddon that the Justice League of America fails to prevent. Believing that the League's overconfidence in their abilities and the exaggerated faith humanity has in them will be their ruin, the villains decide to band together to destroy the Justice League and save the world as they see fit. Toyman, Scarecrow, Poison Ivy and Captain Cold help solve the world's greatest problems, like hunger and physical disabilities, which turns public opinion against the Justice League.

Lex Luthor and Black Manta capture Aquaman and take him to an alien city located within a black sphere at the bottom of the sea, where he is left under the care of Brainiac. Martian Manhunter locates him, as Aquaman has telepathically instructed the oceanic wildlife to form lines visible from space that point to his location. Before he can free Aquaman, Manhunter is ambushed by Gorilla Grodd, who incapacitates him. The rest of the Justice League members - Red Tornado, Wonder Woman, Green Lantern, Green Arrow, Black Canary, Hawkman, Hawkwoman, and Atom - are ambushed by the Legion of Doom's members. Red Tornado finds clues that could lead to Aquaman's location, but is attacked and destroyed by an unknown traitor in the League.

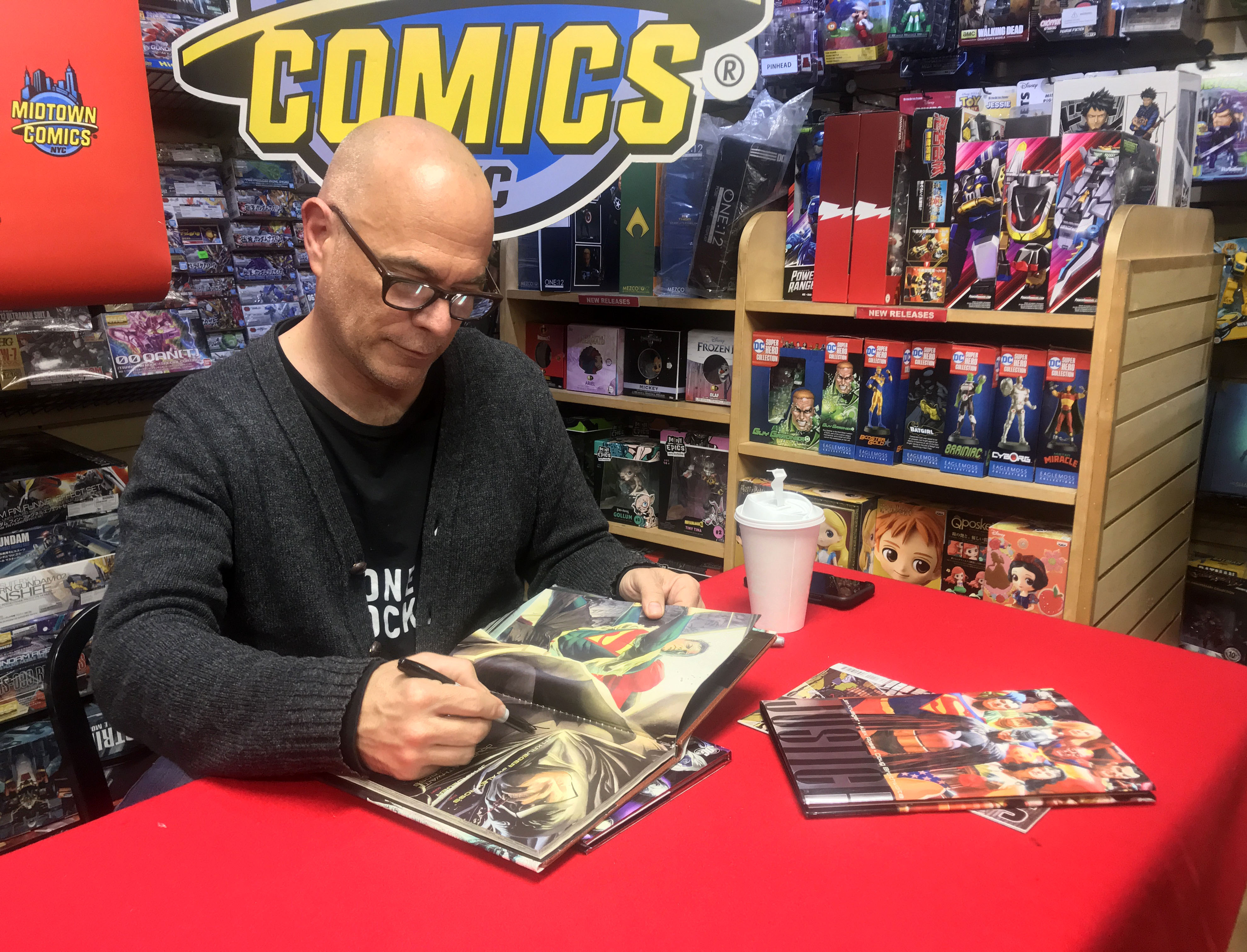
Writer Jim Krueger signing copies of the hardcover collected editions at Midtown Comics Grand Central in Manhattan.

Superman's call for help is answered by Captain Marvel, who singlehandedly dispatches Superman's aggressors. Marvel takes Superman to the Batcave and discovers that Superman and Batman have been infected with mechanical worms, which had forced Batman to destroy Red Tornado. Captain Marvel throws Superman into the Sun, destroying the worms. They head to the Watchtower to get some answers, but it explodes before they can board it.

Martian Manhunter regains control of his body and calls Zatanna to help save Aquaman and Red Tornado. They retrieve Aquaman's body from Brainiac's city and take it to the Chief, who saves him and returns him to life. The League recovers Red Tornado's remains from the destroyed Watchtower and has them repaired by Will Magnus, leader of the Metal Men.

The League members warn Hawkman and Hawkwoman, who had defeated Toyman, that his hideout is located in Midway City, where they find out that he is building robotic bodies for Brainiac, and have the Phantom Stranger rescue Green Lantern. Green Arrow, Black Canary, Atom, Plastic Man, Elongated Man, Metamorpho, the Metal Men, and the Doom Patrol are all called to Superman's Fortress of Solitude in the Arctic.

Batman is found by Wonder Woman, who is able to return him to sanity with her magic lasso. They capture Captain Cold, who reveals the truth: The dream was fabricated by Luthor, Brainiac and Grodd to create a Legion of Doom and use them to destroy the Justice League. The mechanical worms were stolen designs from Dr. Sivana, based on Mister Mind's powers, and Brainiac lobotomized Aquaman to find out if his brain could be used to control Grodd. In the ensuing battle, most of the villains are defeated, but Brainiac, Scarecrow, Poison Ivy, Cheetah, and Black Manta escape. The Green Lantern Corps manages to prevent the nuclear armageddon.

== Continuity ==
Justice takes place outside of the regular DC Universe continuity, with most of the characters featured in the story being modern day incarnations of their Silver Age counterparts. The series heavily draws upon the 1970s Super Friends animated series, most notably the Challenge of the Superfriends incarnation, which featured the Legion of Doom as regular characters.

In an interview, Alex Ross jokingly compared the series to the All-Star Batman and Robin, the Boy Wonder and All-Star Superman, two comics which, like Justice, take place outside the existing DC Universe. All three titles launched within the same time period as part of a wave of continuity-free incarnations of popular DC Universe properties, though Justice did not feature the "All-Star" labeling.

== Characters ==
The story focused on the Justice League centric storyline, though other characters from the DC Universe appear in supporting roles.

=== Justice League of America ===
The roster of the Justice League of America in the story are mostly based on the incarnation of the team seen in the 1970s and early 1980s, commonly referred to as the Justice League Satellite era.

- Superman
- Batman
- Wonder Woman
- The Flash
- Green Lantern
- Martian Manhunter
- Aquaman
- Green Arrow
- Hawkman
- Hawkwoman
- Atom
- Black Canary
- Captain Marvel
- Elongated Man
- Metamorpho
- Phantom Stranger
- Plastic Man
- Red Tornado
- Zatanna

=== Other heroes ===
- Doom Patrol (the Silver Age incarnation)
- Will Magnus
- John Stewart
- Metal Men
- Teen Titans (featuring their Silver Age incarnation)
- Supergirl
- Batgirl
- Captain Marvel Jr.
- Mary Marvel
- Legion of Super-Heroes

=== Legion of Doom roster ===
The supervillain team is based on the villain group from the Super Friends television series. While the original lineup is used, additional villains were added for the series.

- Bizarro
- Black Adam
- Black Manta
- Brainiac
- Captain Cold
- Cheetah
- Clayface
- Giganta
- Gorilla Grodd
- Lex Luthor
- Metallo
- Parasite
- Poison Ivy
- Riddler
- Scarecrow
- Sinestro
- Solomon Grundy
- Toyman

=== Other villains ===
- The Joker
- Two-Face
- Doctor Sivana

== Collected editions ==
The series has been collected into three hardcover volumes, followed by an Absolute DC edition:

- Volume 1 (collects #1–4, hardcover, 160 page, ISBN 1-4012-0969-6, DC Comics)
- Volume 2 (collects #5–8, hardcover, 160 page, ISBN 1-4012-1206-9, DC Comics)
- Volume 3 (collects #9–12, hardcover, 160 page, ISBN 1-4012-1467-3, October 2007, DC Comics)
- Absolute Edition, (collects #1–12, 496 page, ISBN 978-1-4012-2415-8, September 2009, DC Comics)
- Justice (trade paperback, collects #1–12, 384 pgs, ISBN 978-1-4012-3526-0, June 2012, DC Comics)

== Other media ==
DC Direct released a line of action figures based on the mini-series, which include figures of Superman, Batman, Wonder Woman, Flash, Green Lantern, Martian Manhunter, Aquaman, Red Tornado, Plastic Man, Hawkman, John Stewart, Supergirl, Batgirl, Captain Marvel, Black Canary, Lex Luthor, Brainiac, Cheetah, Black Manta, Bizarro, Poison Ivy, the Joker, Captain Cold, Toyman, Solomon Grundy, Scarecrow, Parasite, Sinestro, Gorilla Grodd, Zatanna, and Black Adam.
