= The Clock Maker =

2003 American comic book

The Clock Maker is an American comic book published by Image Comics starting in January 2003. The comic was written by Jim Krueger and pencilled by Matt Smith (Act I) and Jason Baroody (Act II).

The title was launched during a new superhero comics initiative at Image. The story is about a giant clockworks hidden within a hollow mountain in Switzerland. Hundreds of men that never age maintain the old behemoth's operation. The clock is the cause and sustainer of the Earth's revolutions—and more, it is the gateway to Heaven itself.

The first four issues were published as double-sized editions with a 1:1 reproduction ratio, meaning the original art was not resized when it was published. The books were folded in half to fit on standard news racks, and in the current sized protective polymer bags. The back cover of the fourth issue advertised a fifth, coming in June 2003, however that issue was never published.

Act II was never printed in the serial format, but only as a 48-page graphic novel (ISBN 1-58240-377-5) in 2004. Act three was intended to be published in the same manner, but, to this date, has never surfaced. Krueger maintains that the book will be out “in the near future” and that a collection will also be forthcoming.

== Creators ==
- Inker: Michael Halbleib
- Letterer: John D. Roberts
- Colorist: Brett Weldele
