= The Foot Soldiers =

Foot Soldiers #1 (January 1996)

The Foot Soldiers is a post-apocalyptic superhero comic book written by Jim Krueger and with art by Mike Oeming.

== Plot ==
The plot concerns a world where traditional super-heroes once existed, but have since been killed by oppressive robotic beings who rule what is now a totalitarian society. Several teenage delinquents are poking around a superhero graveyard one day when they find artifacts - boots among them - that grant the kids powers. Together, they set out to restore order to their world, though their decisions are affected by their youthful nature - and unlike the Silver Age comics it draws on, this dystopian world has no tolerance for mistakes.

Tagline: When all the heroes are gone, who will fill their shoes?

== Collections ==
Originally issued by Dark Horse Comics it was later collected into a series of trade paperbacks by AiT/Planet Lar.
