= Jim Krueger =

American comics writer

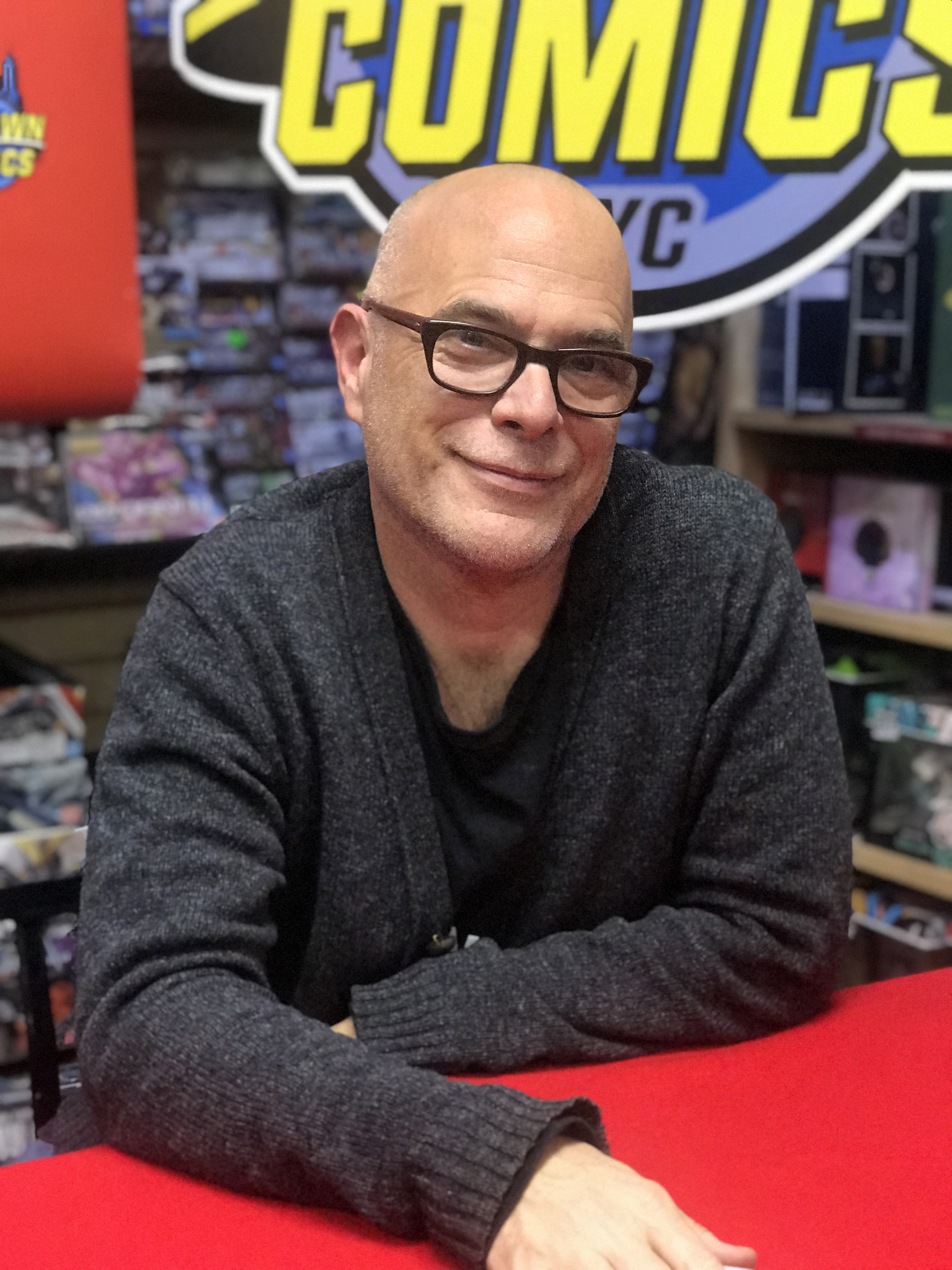
- Krueger at a book signing at Midtown Comics in Manhattan
- Born: James Krueger
- Area: Writer
- Notable works: Earth X Justice

Jim Krueger (/ˈkruːɡər/) is an American comic book writer, novelist, and filmmaker.

== Early life ==
Jim Krueger and his brother grew up in Milwaukee, Wisconsin. He developed an interest in comic books and storytelling in his youth, and has described a fateful trip to Disney World as a seminal event in his burgeoning love of fiction. When his family arrived at the amusement park amid a hurricane. Krueger relates, "So, you had these giant shards of light coming down through the clouds, and my dad looked down at me and said, 'Now you know why they call it the Magic Kingdom.' [And it started me thinking:] What does it mean to go to another world? There [are] always storms, there [are] always tunnels, [and] there [is] always darkness moving to light." Krueger eventually began reading comic books, with Superman being his introduction to the medium, while his brother preferred more expansive, ethical gray area in the stories featuring Batman. Krueger would later comment, "I remember being extremely jealous that he got Batman. I [now] have a whole lecture on 'Superman versus Batman' and the Superman I want to see." Krueger's father eventually came to use comics as an incentive for Krueger's physical labor. Krueger relates, "He had a garage, so he would take me on tow jobs. His payment for me going on these tow jobs would be a couple new comic books—sitting on the seat of the tow truck."

Krueger attended Marquette University, where he majored in journalism, and minored in marketing. He graduated in 1989 with a degree in journalism.

== Career ==
=== Advertising, publishing and filmmaking ===
After graduating college Krueger worked in marketing for a company that advertised products such as like Teat Dip, a substance rubbed on a cow's utters after milking. He eventually lost his job, and decided to focus on comic books. Using his advertising capabilities, he lobbied for a job with to Marvel Comics, which hired him as a copy writer. He eventually was promoted to senior copy writer, assistant creative director, and finally creative director.

At the same time, he studied filmmaking at New York University. One summer in the early 2000s he made a short film called They Might Be Dragons, which he wrote, directed, and produced, on a budget of approximately $1,000 and focused on the story's content rather than special effects, explaining, "As I tell young filmmakers now, it's all about the script, Start with a great script and the rest will fall in line." The film won "Best In Class" at New York University (NYU), "Best Short Film" at the New York Independent Film Festival, and a SILVER from the Crested Butte Film Festival. He directed the Radio City Rockettes in the musical Eleven.

Krueger wrote the story script for Midway Games' Mortal Kombat Shaolin Monks video game, which won the Satellite Award for Best Action/Adventure Video Game.

=== Comics ===
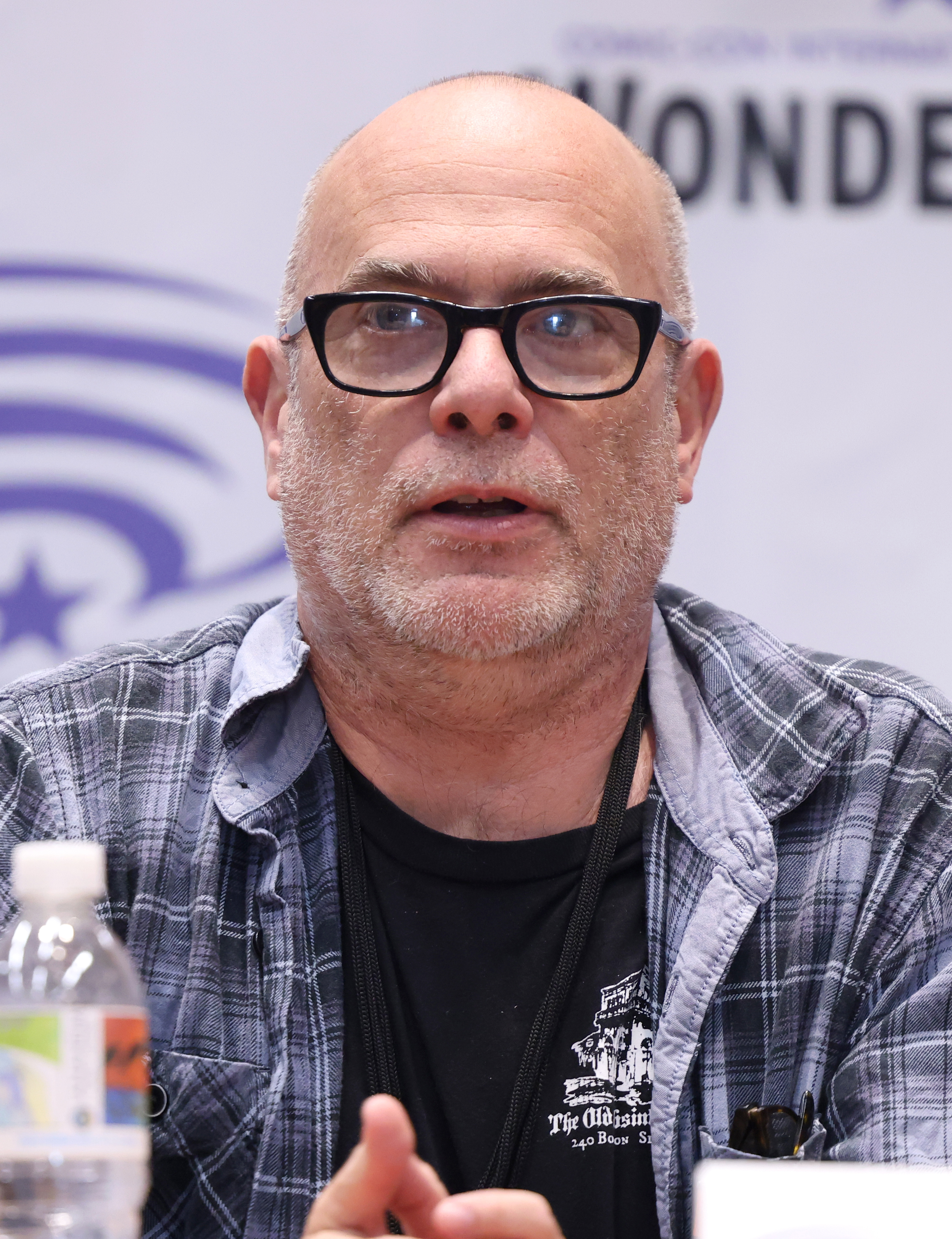
Krueger at the 2025 WonderCon

Krueger wrote the twelve-issue miniseries Justice with Alex Ross for DC Comics. It was a New York Times Bestseller, and won the Eisner Award for Best Graphic Novel. Kruger was named one of the top ten writers in comics and an innovator in the field by Wizard magazine. Justice #1 also won the Diamond Comic Distributors award for Best Comic Book of the Year.

Krueger won two Addy Awards during his first year as a copywriter. A year later he became a creative director at Marvel Comics, and has since become a freelance comic book writer/property creator.

His original works include The Foot Soldiers, Alphabet Supes, The Clock Maker, The Runner, The High Cost of Happily Ever After and The Last Straw Man.

Krueger's other work for Marvel Comics includes the Earth X trilogy with Alex Ross, Avengers, X-Men and Avengers/Invaders. Krueger and Alex Ross re-teamed on Project Superpowers for Dynamite Entertainment.

Krueger's comics work for other publishers includes Star Wars, The Matrix Comics, Micronauts, Galactic, Batman, and Capone vs. Dracula. He was a contributing writer for the Buffy the Vampire Slayer comics, writing "Safe", the story in issue #24 of Buffy the Vampire Slayer Season Eight, which received an Outstanding Comic Book award in the 2010 GLAAD Awards.

His book The Frankincense Monster and Other Haunted Christmas Stories was read for charity for the Los Angeles Children's Hospital.

Krueger created his own comic book brand 26 Soldiers, for which he serves as president and publisher.
