= Earth X =

Limited series depicting a dystopian alternate Marvel universe

- Cover of the hardcover collected edition art by Alex Ross
- Created by: Alex Ross; Jim Krueger

Publication information
- Publisher: Marvel Comics
- Schedule: Monthly
- Title(s): Earth X Universe X Paradise X Marvels X
- Formats: Original material for the series has been published as a set of limited series.
- Genre: Superhero
- Publication date: Earth X; March 1999 – June 2000; Universe X; September 2000 – November 2001; Paradise X; April 2002 – November 2003; Marvels X; January 2020–October 2020
- Number of issues: Earth X; 14; Universe X; 14; Paradise X; 14; Marvels X; 6

Creative team
- Writer(s): Jim Krueger; Alex Ross
- Artist(s): John Paul Leon; Doug Braithwaite; Well-Bee
- Inker(s): Bill Reinhold
- Letterer(s): Todd Klein
- Colorist(s): Matt Hollingsworth; Melissa Edwards; Linda Lessmann

Reprints
- Collected editions
- Earth X Hardcover: ISBN 0-7851-1875-6
- Universe X Volume 1: ISBN 0-7851-2413-6
- Universe X Volume 2: ISBN 0-7851-2414-4
- Paradise X Volume 1: ISBN 0-7851-2415-2
- Paradise X Volume 2: ISBN 0-7851-2416-0

Earth X is a 1999 comic book limited series published by American company Marvel Comics. Earth X was written by Jim Krueger with art by John Paul Leon. Based on Alex Ross' notes, the series features a dystopian version of the Marvel Universe.

The series was followed by two sequels, Universe X and Paradise X, and a prequel, Marvels X. The universe of Earth X is designated as Earth-9997 in the Marvel Comics multiverse.

Elements of the storyline were adapted to the Marvel Cinematic Universe (MCU) entries Eternals (2021), Moon Knight (2022), and The Fantastic Four: First Steps (2025), while the Earth X incarnation of Spider-Man made his cinematic debut in the 2023 feature film Spider-Man: Across the Spider-Verse, depicted as a member of Miguel O'Hara's Spider-Society.

== History ==
Earth X began in 1997 when Wizard magazine asked Alex Ross to create a possible dystopian future for Marvel. Ross designed a future where all ordinary humans had gained superpowers, and he examined how some of the most well-known Marvel characters (including Spider-Man, Captain America and the Hulk) would manage a world where their superhero powers had now become commonplace. The issue of Wizard that contained the Ross article sold out rapidly. Demand was so extensive that in 1999 (in affiliation with Marvel), they republished the article as the Earth X Sketchbook, which also sold out. Based on this indicator of fan interest, Marvel commissioned Ross to create a full series based on his notes.

== Plot summary ==
=== Earth X ===
Black Bolt releases the mutagenic Terrigen Mists into Earth's atmosphere, seeking to transform humanity into Inhumans so that his people would not suffer persecution. Black Bolt then blinds Uatu before leaving Earth with the Inhumans. Uatu transports X-51 (Machine Man)—who has long since given up super-heroics to imitate the life of his human creator—to the Moon to act as Earth's new Watcher.

The Terrigen Mists begin mutating Earth's human population, though much of the world blames "Plague X" on Reed Richards' failed experiment, which was intended to solve a looming energy crisis using a network of vibranium power centers. Benny Beckley, the young son of Comet Man, gains the ability to control the actions of others and becomes known as Skull. Meanwhile, Doctor Doom and Namor fight the Fantastic Four. Doom is killed in an explosion along with Susan Richards. Namor kills Johnny Storm. Franklin Richards responds by cursing Namor, causing one side of his body to burst into flame upon contact with air. Namor is forced back into the ocean. A distraught Reed dons Doom's armor and exiles himself to Castle Doom in Latveria.

Soon after, Absorbing Man absorbs Ultron. Vision defeats Absorbing Man with a computer virus. Attempting to isolate the virus by turning to stone, Absorbing Man is shattered by Vision after murdering the Avengers. Absorbing Man's pieces are scattered amongst the world's leaders so that he can never be reassembled.

Norman Osborn manipulates America into electing him President by using alien DNA to create Hydra—a mind-controlling parasite. Osborn grants Tony Stark political asylum in exchange for constructing robotic replicas of the fallen Avengers to battle Hydra.

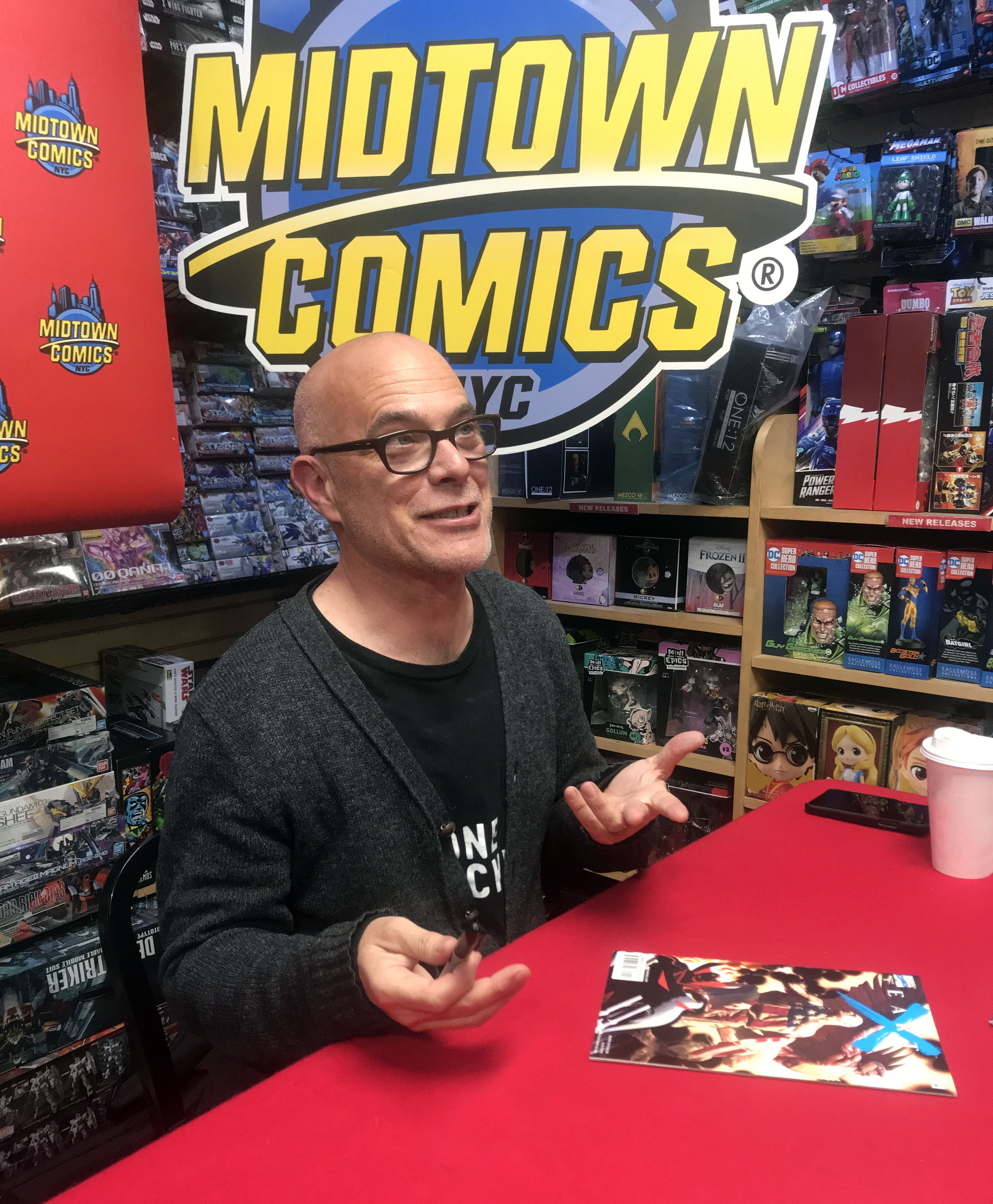
Writer Jim Krueger signing a copy of the book at Midtown Comics Grand Central in Manhattan

Loki discovers that ancient humans were modified by the Celestials, given the ability to develop powers to act as a type of anti-bodies, to stop radical elements such as Deviants and alien species from harming the Earth and the Celestial embryo growing within it. Along with Earth, the Celestials modified the native species of many planets harboring Celestial embryos, causing them to gradually evolve and develop superpowers - either by through natural means such as mutants, or unnatural means, as with superhumans like Spider-Man. Species with Celestial modifications in theory hold enough power to rival the Celestials, but are inhibited by a psychological safeguard put in place by the Celestials. The safeguard relates to constructivist philosophy, that essentially states that people are shaped by their environment. The deities and devils within the Marvel universe are species that were modified by Celestials and unwittingly inhibit their own abilities due to the fact that they self-identify as a deity or devil. These evolved beings hold their sense of identity being reinforced by those that interact with them.

The Inhuman Royal Family return from space and contact Reed Richards, hoping to reunite with their people. While trying to find the lost Inhuman nation with Cerebro, Reed discovers Black Bolt's actions. Skull's army reaches New York, overtaking it, and Captain America and his allies fall to Skull's powers. While Skull is distracted, Captain America kills him and liberates his followers.

Before the heroes can celebrate, the Celestials arrive on Earth to germinate the embryo. As the Celestials prepare to attack New York, Loki arrives with a host of Asgardians found in the afterlife. Stark sacrifices himself while trying to hold off the arriving Celestials. Black Bolt is killed after using his voice to travel across the universe and call for Galactus, who is revealed to be devouring worlds in order to destroy Celestial embryos growing within them. Galactus consumes Earth's Celestial embryo before revealing himself to be Franklin Richards. After the Fantastic Four used the Ultimate Nullifier to kill Galactus, Franklin sacrificed his own identity to become Galactus's successor, reasoning that Galactus existed to keep the Celestial population in check.

X-51 realizes the Watchers' true purpose is to watch over Celestial eggs because one of their numbers failed to stop the birth of Galactus millions of years ago. X-51 then decides to destroy all Celestial eggs gestating inside the various planets within the universe. Reed repurposes his vibranium power network, hoping to destroy the Terrigen Mist.

=== Universe X ===
With the Celestial embryo gone, Earth's mass is reduced, causing a shift in orbit and polarity as well as drastic worldwide climate changes. The Tong of Creel, a cult dedicated to reassembling Absorbing Man, begins killing those who hold his fragments. Under Mephisto's influence, Pope Immortus founds a church advocating mutant dominance of the galaxy and the destruction of Reed's network. Meanwhile, Mar-Vell is reincarnated as the child of Him and Her, though his soul remains in the Realm of the Dead. Captain America becomes Mar-Vell's guardian and embarks on a worldwide quest with him to deal with Earth's mutant population and prepare for an impending war in the Realm of the Dead. Arriving at Zero Street, the duo is attacked by the Night People, and Captain America sacrifices his life to save Mar-Vell.

Mar-Vell reveals that other than creating constructivist safeguards to stop species that they modified from being able to challenge their supremacy, the Celestials also schemed to manipulate causality and fatalism by helping to create beings such as death and Mephisto to distort truth and reality. Mar-Vell also discovered that beings that travel through time actually create new universes in the process of doing so and Celestials, acting through others such as Mephisto, encouraged time travel as it created entirely new universes for the Celestial to inhabit and grow in number.

When the Tong of Creel finally reassembles Absorbing Man in New York, Absorbing Man absorbs Manhattan itself, adding its buildings and streets to his being. However, Loki and Iron Maiden convince Absorbing Man to transform himself into vibranium and use his mass to stabilize Earth's fluctuating orbit and polarity. Meanwhile, in the Realm of the Dead, Mar-Vell leads an army of deceased heroes and villains against Thanos and Death. With the artifacts collected by himself and Captain America in his possession, Mar-Vell shows Thanos how Death has manipulated him and convinces Thanos to use the Ultimate Nullifier on the entity.

=== Paradise X ===
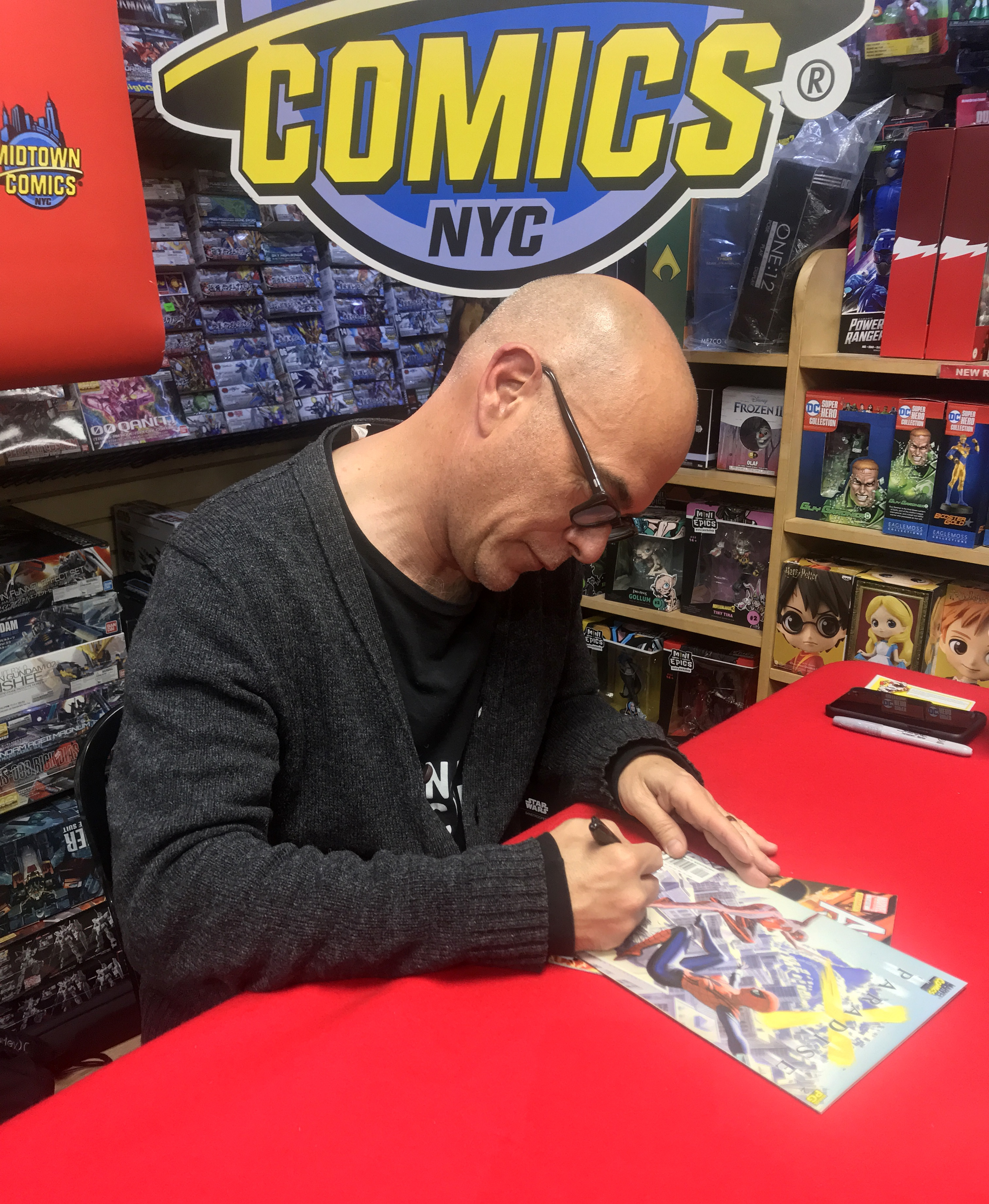
Krueger signing an issue of the sequel series Paradise X

With Death destroyed, Mar-Vell constructs a Paradise in the center of the Negative Zone for the dead to inhabit. However, the living find themselves unable to die.

Meanwhile, X-51 decides that the inhabitants of alternate Earths should be warned about the Celestial embryos he believes are growing within their planets. He spreads the alarm across the multiverse by recruiting and dispatching Heralds from alternate timelines such as Bloodstorm (Ororo Munroe, Earth-1298), Deathlok (Luther Manning, Earth-7484), Hyperion (Earth-1121), Killraven (Earth-691), Iron Man 2020 (Earth-8410), Spider-Girl (Earth-1122), and Wolverine (Days of Future Past, Earth-811).

After banishing the Watchers of Earth-9997 to alternate worlds with the hope that their presence will lead to the discovery and destruction of each Celestial embryo, X-51 takes his Heralds to his Earth, where he will aid each in achieving their wishes. In Mar-Vell's Paradise, the High Evolutionary's equipment transforms the souls of Black Bolt, Captain America, Daredevil (Matt Murdock), Doctor Doom, Giant-Man, Phoenix, and Tony Stark into the Avenging Host, charged with ushering souls from the Realm of the Dead to Paradise. Those who enter Paradise consume a piece of the Cosmic Cube, enabling them to create their own, seemingly perfect pocket reality. But as more souls enter Paradise, it begins to expand and consume entire worlds within the Negative Zone, causing Blastaar and Annihilus to attack the Baxter Building in New York.

Reed Richards, Bruce Banner, Beast, and several other scientists convene to discuss a solution to Death's absence. They decide to access the imprisoned Jude the Entropic Man, who can turn others to dust on contact, and synthesize his essence into a chemical to end the suffering of those unable to die. With the chemical complete, Reed, growing suspicious of Mar-Vell's motives, plans to use Pym Particles to slow Paradise's growth. Mephisto frees Jude from captivity, convincing him to go on a killing spree. With the help of Merlin, Doctor Strange, Psylocke and the sacrifice of Meggan, King Britain uses Excalibur to kill Mephisto. Meanwhile, in Paradise, Reed and a legion of heroes confront Mar-Vell. After Paradise is nearly conquered in the name of the Supreme Intelligence by the arriving souls of the Kree military, Mar-Vell explains to Reed that the latter will become the new Eternity.

Using his new role as Eternity, Reed ends the conflict and frees the remaining heroes from their Cosmic Cube-induced dream-worlds. Once this is accomplished, Mar-Vell explains to Reed that his plan is to build a wall around their universe, preventing further influence from the Celestials. Feeling that his work is not yet complete, Mar-Vell tells the people of Paradise that he is going to the source of Excalibur, which is strongly implied to be the original universe.

=== Marvels X ===
In 2020, Marvel published Marvels X, a prequel to Earth X written by Krueger. It focuses on the last normal human being on Earth named David as he deals with the aftermath of the Terrigen Mist that turns most of the individuals of Earth into super powered beings and freaks.

== Characters (Earth X and Universe X) ==
- Uatu – Uatu has been blinded and has not been able to watch the Earth for twenty years, and has become very nihilistic and callous.
- Machine Man – A transparent Machine Man has become the New Watcher after Uatu became blind, and ultimately renders Uatu useless by removing his source of hearing, annoyed at his assurance at the heroes' defeat.

=== Avengers ===
- Steve Rogers / Captain America – Steve Rogers / Captain America is 100 years old and showing his age, although still in physically good shape. He has become a broken, haunted man who struggles to maintain hope in defending the nation whose name he bears. He bears an A-shaped scar on his forehead.
- T'Challa / Black Panther – T'Challa / Black Panther was mutated into a humanoid panther.
- Bruce Banner / Hulk – Hulk has been separated from Bruce Banner, who was transformed into a child, while Hulk devolved into an ape-like creature. Banner was blinded by his transformation, but can see through Hulk's eyes.
- Carol Danvers / Ms. Marvel – Ms. Marvel assisted Mar-Vell in fighting Death.
- Thor – Thor is now a woman due to Loki tricking Odin into thinking that Thor needs to learn humility as a female.

==== Avenging Host ====
After Mar-Vell killed Death, he reshapes part of the Realm of the Dead into a paradise and selected a group of dead heroes to be its guardians called the Avenging Host. Most of its members have an angel-like appearance.

- Blackagar Boltagon / Black Bolt – After trying to stop Maximus from detonating the Terrigen Crystal Bomb, he died in battle against the Celestials.
- Victor Von Doom / Doctor Doom – Doom possesses metallic skin. He is later killed in an explosion.
- Hank Pym / Giant-Man – Absorbing Man kills him by impaling him on the Washington Monument.
- Clint Barton / Hawkeye – Clint Barton / Hawkeye was mutated to have two additional sets of arms. Absorbing Man kills him by absorbing rubber and deflecting his arrows back at him.
- Tony Stark / Iron Man – Fearing mutation, Stark isolates himself in a sterile environment, remotely controlling his Iron Man suits.
- Matt Murdock / Daredevil – He and Elektra Natchios are killed by Bullseye.
- Phoenix Force – In death, the Phoenix Force adopts an appearance similar to Jean Grey.

=== Fantastic Four ===
The Fantastic Four no longer exist with the exception of Invisible Woman.

- Reed Richards / Mister Fantastic – Reed Richards / Mister Fantastic wears Doctor Doom's armor and inhabits his castle. In Universe X, he donates an arm for Alicia Master to sculpt in the image of Susan Storm-Richards and the two are reunited. In Paradise X, he becomes the New Eternity.
- Susan Storm / Invisible Woman – Invisible Woman accepted her fate and ultimately learned to live in the dystopian society, in addition to never return to her home.
- Ben Grimm / Thing – Thing married Alicia Masters and they have two children, Buzz and Chuck (collectively known as the Brothers Grimm).
- Johnny Storm / Human Torch - The Human Torch was killed by Namor snapping his neck.

=== X-Men ===
- Charles Xavier / Professor X – Charles Xavier / Professor X died at the beginning of the mutations when the Skull's power manifestation caused a psychic backlash and the X-Men disbanded. His spirit later aided Mar-Vell in fighting Death.
- Warren Worthington / Archangel – Archangel lost his fortune and became a literal "guardian angel".
- Sean Cassidy / Banshee – Banshee was killed by Black Tom Cassidy. His spirit later aided Mar-Vell in fighting Death.
- Hank McCoy / Beast – Beast's fur became white and he moved to Wakanda to work under Black Panther.
- Nathan Summers / Cable – Cable fully succumbed to the techno-organic virus and took refuge in Sentinel City.
- Piotr "Peter" Rasputin / Colossus – Colossus became the Czar of Russia.
- Scott Summers / Cyclops – Cyclops, under a new identity called Mr. S, becomes the leader of a new team of X-Men to help Captain America.
- Alison Blaire / Dazzler – Dazzler was killed by Mephisto in retaliation for Mar-Vell killing Death.
- Alex Summers / Havok – Havok joined his father Corsair in space following Professor X's death.
- Robert "Bobby" Drake / Iceman – Iceman is trapped in his ice form and was forced to move to a colder climate. He built a city at the North Pole.
- Katherine "Kitty" Pryde / Shadowcat – Kitty was killed when protecting Colossus from a bullet that was meant for him at the time when he could not shift to his metal form.
- Kurt Wagner / Nightcrawler – Kurt Wagner / Nightcrawler is a shadow of his former self and has become a demon after being tricked by Mephisto. After losing his arm, Nightcrawler becomes Belasco, the Lord of Limbo.
- Jean Grey – A woman who appears to be Jean is now married to Wolverine and the Phoenix Force resides in the Realm of the Dead. It is unclear how Jean could be alive when the Skull's emergence apparently killed all other telepaths. Later in the Earth X series as she is leaving Wolverine, the woman states that she is in fact Madelyne Pryor.
- Longshot – Longshot went missing and not even X-51 can find him.
- Jamie Madrox / Multiple Man – Multiple Man ended up with the Wendigo curse after cannibalizing one of his duplicates due to a food shortage.
- Nate Grey – Nate was infected by the techno-organic virus and became Stryfe. He battled Cable and died trying to protect Madelyne Pryor.
- Lorna Dane / Polaris – Polaris leaves with Havok to join Corsair in space.
- Anna Marie / Rogue – According to X-51, Rogue was killed by a kiss that killed Gambit as well. However, Beast recounts that Rogue was so grief-stricken by Gambit's death that she sought a cure for her mutant ability through Sauron (who ended up taking her life as well as her powers). The details of either of these two accounts, or if they are related or not, remains to be substantiated.
- Ororo Munroe / Storm – Ororo Munroe / Storm marries T'Challa / Black Panther and becomes the Queen of Wakanda.
- John Proudstar / Thunderbird – John Proudstar / Thunderbird is seen in the Realm of the Dead talking with Professor X.
- James "Logan" Howlett / Wolverine – Wolverine is married to the woman claiming to be Jean Grey. He is overweight and appears to be drunk despite his healing factor. With help from Machine Man, he discovers that he is a descendant of Moon-Boy's species.

==== New X-Men ====
This is the new incarnation of the X-Men that is led by Cyclops. They were former members of the second Daredevil's circus:

- Charmer – Charmer can create energy constructs in the shape of snakes. She has feelings for her new mentor, which remains unrequited.
- Dogface – Dogface is implied to be a mutated dog living in Wakanda. He was the Dog-Faced Boy before joining the X-Men.
- Double-Header – Double-Header is a two-headed human.
- Mermaid – Mermaid has mutated a fish tail giving her the appearance of a mermaid. She is able to "swim" in the air.
- Tower – Tower is a giant human.

=== Other heroes ===
- Brian Braddock / Captain Britain – Brian Braddock / Captain Britain is the king of Britain.
- Christopher Summers / Corsair – Christopher Summers / Corsair is joined by Alex Summers / Havok and Lorna Dane / Polaris in space.
- Daredevil – Following the death of the original Daredevil, a man with a powerful healing factor (who Thing believes to be Wade Wilson / Deadpool) has taken his name and performs as a circus stunt-man, using his powers to overcome horrific injuries.
- Devil Dinosaur and Moon-Boy – Devil Dinosaur and Moon-Boy are both dead. Their corpses are found on the Blue Area of the Moon.
- Doc Samson – Doc Samson becomes a psychiatrist of the Skull. He is killed when the Skull uses his powers to make Samson rip his body apart.
- Stephen Strange / Doctor Strange – Doctor Strange is killed in his astral form by Clea, who then allies herself with Loki. His body is looked after by Wong. Mar-Vell later restores his astral form enabling Doctor Strange to return to life.
- Kevin Plunder / Ka-Zar – Ka-Zar mutates to have the head of a Smilodon.
- Luke Cage – Luke Cage fights crime as a police officer.
- Mar-Vell – Mar-Vell is reborn as a child and goes on a crusade to gather various powerful artifacts in order to create a paradise. Captain America joins him on his quest.
- Namor McKenzie / Namor the Sub-Mariner – Namor is cursed by Franklin Richards for killing Human Torch. One side of his body burns when in contact with air forcing him to remain in the ocean.
- Kyle Richmond / Nighthawk – Kyle Richmond / Nighthawk's eyes, given by a disguised Mephisto, allow him to see into the future. He dictates what he sees to his colleague Isaac Christians so that a record can be kept of what will become of history.
- Hobie Brown / Prowler – Hobie Brown / Prowler possesses a piece of Absorbing Man following his rampage in Washington DC.
- Rom – Rom is stranded in Limbo and is forced to fight Dire Wraiths constantly. He is referred to as "the greatest Spaceknight".
- The Micronauts - referred to as the "ant-men"
- Shanna O'Hara / Shanna the She-Devil – Shanna O'Hara / Shanna the She-Devil mutates to resemble a humanoid leopard.
- Peter Parker / Spider-Man – Peter Parker, losing his wife Mary Jane Watson and publicly revealed as Spider-Man, retires, figuring he is no longer needed in this world of powers. However, he leaps into action once again after his daughter had been turned into a slave of the Skull.
- May "Mayday" Parker / Spider-Girl – Spider-Girl has bonded with the Venom symbiote, straining her relationship with her father, though she remains fully in control.
- Shiro Yoshida / Sunfire – Sunfire now rules Japan as its emperor.

=== Villains ===
- Carl "Crusher" Creel / Absorbing Man – Carl "Crusher" Creel / Absorbing Man absorbs Ultron's intelligence and gains better knowledge of his abilities. He kills the Avengers until Vision infects him with a virus and shatters him. Absorbing Man is brought back by the Tong of Creel and attacks New York. He is convinced by Loki and Iron Maiden to turn his body into vibranium to save New York.
- Bullseye – Bullseye is killed when Daredevil learns the Hand's body-swapping technique.
- Otto Octavius / Doctor Octopus – Doctor Octopus is seen in Spider-Man's illusion on Peter Parker of which he took control.
- Enforcers – The Enforcers act as the bodyguards to President Norman Osborn.
  - Fancy Dan – Fancy Dan mutates and becomes invisible except for his mustache.
  - Montana – Montana mutates and develops the ability to change his hands into lassos.
  - Ox – Ox mutates, taking the form of a humanoid ox (somewhat similar to a minotaur).
- Norman Osborn / Green Goblin – Norman Osborn is the President. His face has mutated to resemble a goblin, but he wears a mask to look human. He is later killed by the Skull. After he is tossed from his office window, his foot catches on the flag which breaks his neck, thus killing him in a way similar to Gwen Stacy's death.
- High Evolutionary – High Evolutionary uses one of his devices to convert Franklin Richards into the new Galactus.
- Immortus – Immortus is the Pope of a church dedicated to himself.
- Billy Russo / Jigsaw – Jigsaw commits suicide and dwells in the Realm of the Dead.
- Wilson Fisk / Kingpin – Kingpin is dead and dwells in the Realm of the Dead.
- Kraven the Hunter - Kraven the Hunter mutated into a humanoid lion.
- Loki – Loki has figured out that the Gods (of this Marvel Earth) are instead long-lived mutants who are mind-locked by the Celestials into believing that they are immortal, never-changing gods so that they won't evolve further as mutants and potentially threaten the Celestials (as was the case with Reed Richards' son Franklin, who is so powerful as a mutant that just by believing himself to be Galactus, gained the powers and abilities of Galactus).
- Erik Lehnsherr / Magneto – At the time when the Terrigen Mist is in the atmosphere, Magneto thinks he is getting a "mutant" brother through every mutation. Magneto manipulates the Sentinels into building a sanctuary called Sentinel City in the Savage Land. Due to the polar shift in the planet, he loses his power which was later gained by Toad. Toad humiliates Magneto until Iron Maiden with the help of Cable restores part of Earth's polarity giving Magneto back his power.
- Calvin Zabo / Mister Hyde – Hyde appears in the Realm of the Dead as one of the mindless dead. The details of his death are unknown.
- Karl Lykos / Sauron – Hank McCoy / Beast claims that, grief-stricken after killing Gambit with a kiss, Anna Marie / Rogue turns to Sauron's draining abilities in an attempt to lose her powers, but ended up losing her life as well. Whether this is true is not confirmed.
- Skull – Son of Comet Man, Benjamin Buckley aka The Skull is the main antagonist of the series. An adolescent neo-Nazi, he uses his Terrigen Mist granted-telepathic powers to rule the world, taking advantage of the Mists' catastrophic effects. Captain America defeats him by snapping his neck.
- Spiders Man – An African-American homeless man who mutates to a reptilian form that resembles Spider-Man's costume. He uses energy webs that can trap people in an illusion.
- Ultron – His intelligence is absorbed by Carl "Crusher" Creel / Absorbing Man.
- Adrian Toomes / Vulture – Adrian Toomes / Vulture mutates into his namesake minus the wings. He is associated with the Enforcers.

=== Other characters ===
- Harry Osborn – Harry is seen in Spider-Man's illusion on Peter Parker of which he gained control.
- J. Jonah Jameson – J. Jonah Jameson loses his job and the Daily Bugle goes out of business when Spider-Man reveals his identity as Peter Parker. Jameson later mutates into a humanoid donkey.
- John Jameson – John becomes Man-Wolf. He regulates his Man-Wolf transformations with a special device created by Reed Richards that absorbs ambient sunlight, causing him to only transform at night.
- Red Ronin - Decommissioned by Norman Osborn, his blueprints were used to make Iron Man's last armor.

== Reception ==
The staff of Wizard magazine named Earth X the best comic of 1999 in its 100th issue.

== Clarifications ==
Initially, the Earth X storyline was purported as being the future of Earth-616, but the series often substantially retconned the origins and workings of characters to better suit the story, to the point where they were no longer reconcilable with their counterparts in the mainstream Marvel Universe. One example is the revelation in Paradise X that Wolverine is not a mutant, but instead one of the few remaining "pure strain humans", free from the genetic manipulations of the Celestials (as well as a descendant of Moon-Boy). Marvel editors solved these discrepancies by officially declaring that anything stated in Earth X would not be considered canonical. It is later revealed in issue #11 of Paradise X that the events shown in the series are not set in an alternative future, but rather an alternative present (the issue reveals that Paradise X is set in 2003, the year of publication).

The Paradise X series was never properly concluded, due to editorial interference midway through its publication. Due to dwindling sales, the X and A specials, which were intended to be double-sized issues, were both reduced to 22 pages and the intended ending was never used. Writer Jim Krueger expressed dismay at the loss of pages and not being able to use the original ending. In the intended ending, Captain America, suspecting Captain Marvel's treachery, would have killed Marvel just as Marvel put the energy wall around the universe to keep out the Celestials and Elders. At this final moment, having ascended to the throne of Paradise, Captain America would have realized that Marvel's intentions were good: "Cap would have sat on the throne, completely unworthy of it. And this, this would have been the final testing necessary to make Cap worthy of it".

== Collected editions ==
In September 2005, Marvel released a 592-page hardcover deluxe edition of Earth X. This edition included the Earth X regular series, the #0 and #X bookends, the #1 / 2 issue (drawn by artist Bill Reinhold) and the Epilogue, plus extras pulled from the Graphitti hardcover, Marvel's trade paperback and the sketchbooks.

The various volumes include:

- Earth X (hardcover, September 2005, ISBN 0-7851-1875-6, softcover, January 2001, ISBN 0-7851-0755-X, July 2006, ISBN 0-7851-2325-3)
- Universe X:
  - Volume 1 (softcover, February 2002, ISBN 0-7851-0867-X, December 2006, ISBN 0-7851-2413-6)
  - Volume 2 (softcover, June 2002, ISBN 0-7851-0885-8, March 2007, ISBN 0-7851-2414-4)
- Paradise X:
  - Volume 1 (softcover, October 2003, ISBN 0-7851-1120-4, August 2007, ISBN 0-7851-2415-2)
  - Volume 2 (softcover, December, 2003, ISBN 0-7851-1121-2, September 2007, ISBN 0-7851-2416-0)

Accompanying volumes include:

- Earth X Trilogy Companion (collects Earth X #1 / 2, background material and sketches, 200 pages, October 2007, ISBN 0-7851-2417-9)

== In other media ==
- Many elements of the storyline were adapted in the Marvel Cinematic Universe:
  - Earth X was cited as a major inspiration for the film, Eternals, including the Eternals and Deviants' origins and the revelation of Earth harboring a Celestial seed.
  - The franchise’s incarnation of Moon Knight is visually inspired by the Universe X version of the character.
  - The Shalla-Bal incarnation of Silver Surfer appeared in The Fantastic Four: First Steps, portrayed by Julia Garner.
- The Earth X incarnation of Spider-Man makes a cameo appearance in Spider-Man: Across the Spider-Verse as a member of Miguel O'Hara's Spider-Society.
- The Shalla-Bal incarnation of Silver Surfer, based on her The Fantastic Four: First Steps appearance, appears as a playable character in Marvel Future Fight.

== See also ==
- Multiverse (Marvel Comics)
- Inhumanity
- Kingdom Come, another alternate universe series, illustrated by Alex Ross for DC Comics which has similar themes and artwork to Earth X.
