= Montana (character) =

Character in Marvel Comics

- Montana (bottom) and the Enforcers on the textless cover of Daredevil #102 (January 2008). Art by Marko Djurdjevic.

Publication information
- Publisher: Marvel Comics
- First appearance: The Amazing Spider-Man #10 (March 1964)
- Created by: Stan Lee; Steve Ditko

In-story information
- Alter ego: Jackson W. Brice
- Species: Human
- Team affiliations: Enforcers
- Abilities: Trained mercenary; Expert marksman; Skilled in the use of a lasso

Jackson W. "Montana" Brice, known mononymsly as Montana, is a supervillain appearing in American comic books published by Marvel Comics. Created by Stan Lee and Steve Ditko, he first appeared in The Amazing Spider-Man #10 (March 1964). Montana is traditionally depicted as the leader of the Enforcers, a group of professional assassins employed by villains such as the Big Man, the Green Goblin, and the Kingpin, which has brought them into repeated conflict with the superheroes Spider-Man and Daredevil.

The character has been adapted from the comics into several other forms of media, most notably adopting the Shocker persona in both The Spectacular Spider-Man animated series (voiced by Jeff Bennett) and the 2017 Marvel Cinematic Universe film Spider-Man: Homecoming (portrayed by Logan Marshall-Green).

== Publication history ==
Montana first appeared alongside the other Enforcers in The Amazing Spider-Man #10 (March 1964), and was created by Stan Lee and Steve Ditko.

The character subsequently appears in The Amazing Spider-Man #14 (July 1964), #19 (December 1964), The Amazing Spider-Man Annual #1 (1964), Marvel Team-Up #39-40 (November–December 1975), The Spectacular Spider-Man #19-20 (June–July 1978), Dazzler #7-8 (October–September 1981), Marvel Team-Up #138 (February 1984), Tales of the Marvels: Inner Demons #1 (1996), Civil War: War Crimes #1 (February 2007), Daredevil #99-100 (September–October 2007), #102 (January 2008), and The Amazing Spider-Man #562-563 (August 2008).

Montana appeared as part of the "Enforcers" entry in the Official Handbook of the Marvel Universe Deluxe Edition #4.

== Fictional character biography ==
Jackson W. Brice was born in Bozeman, Montana. Along with Fancy Dan (Daniel Brito) and Ox (Raymond Bloch), he is one of the founding members of the Enforcers. He is highly proficient in the use of the lariat.

Montana, Fancy Dan and Ox make their first appearance under the employ of the Big Man (Frederick Foswell). During this time, they have their first run-in with their longtime nemesis Spider-Man. During their first fight against the web-slinger, Montana's lasso skills initially prove successful but Spider-Man defeats the trio.

Over the next couple of years, Montana and the team are employed by Lightmaster in one of his many schemes, again bringing them into conflict with Spider-Man, with similar results. They would then lend their services to Tech-Master in his revenge plot against Harry S. Osgood, only to be defeated by Dazzler.

Following the events of the 2008 "Brand New Day" storyline, the Enforcers appear as patrons at the Bar With No Name. They take bets with a person calling himself "The Bookie", over whether Spider-Man will show up to battle "Basher", an unknown villain who claims to have fought Spider-Man. Spider-Man shows up, but is revealed to be Screwball in disguise when the real Spider-Man appears. The Enforcers decide to get revenge on The Bookie, capturing him. The Bookie's father calls Spider-Man for assistance, and he agrees to help. Spider-Man defeats Fancy Dan and Montana.

In the story arc "Kill To Be You", Montana is the right-hand man of the Kingpin (Wilson Fisk), and shows contempt toward the Hobgoblin (Phil Urich). When Spider-Man and the Black Cat arrive, Montana falls out a window to his death while Hobgoblin saves Kingpin.

During the Dead No More: The Clone Conspiracy storyline, Montana is among the villains who are resurrected in clone bodies by Ben Reilly posing as the Jackal.

== Other versions ==
- An alternate universe version of Montana from Earth-9997 appears in Earth X. This version is Norman Osborn's bodyguard and was mutated by Terrigen Mists, giving him the ability to transform his arms into lassos.
- An alternate universe version of Montana appears in Spider-Man Noir as a bodyguard for the "Goblin".
- An alternate universe version of Montana named Montana Bale appears in the Ultimate Marvel imprint as an employee of the Kingpin.

== In other media ==
=== Television ===
- Montana, referred to as Cowboy, appears in the Spider-Man episode "Blueprint for Crime", voiced by Bernard Cowan.

Montana as the Shocker in The Spectacular Spider-Man

- Montana appears as the Shocker in The Spectacular Spider-Man, voiced by Jeff Bennett. This version is the leader of the Enforcers and the owner of the Big Sky Billiard Room, a bar frequented by New York City's criminals. The character was chosen to act as the series' incarnation of the Shocker because producer Greg Weisman felt he was more interesting and threatening than Herman Schultz, the original Shocker. Montana's Shocker costume is similar to the source material with added goggles and larger gauntlets. Initially hired by Tombstone to lead the Enforcers in killing Spider-Man, Montana steals a shockwave-generating battlesuit from Tricorp to become the "Shocker", only to be defeated by Spider-Man. Following this, Montana escapes prison and joins the Sinister Six to exact revenge on Spider-Man, only to be defeated by him under his black suit's control. In the second season, Montana leaves the Sinister Six to rejoin the Enforcers. After his teammates receive their own battlesuits and dub themselves the "New Enforcers", they are hired by Tombstone to rob the Federal Gold Repository, but Spider-Man intervenes while Hammerhead secretly sabotages their escape to usurp Tombstone, resulting in their apprehension and incarceration in the Vault.
- Montana appears in the Ultimate Spider-Man episode "Nightmare on Christmas", voiced by Troy Baker.

=== Film ===
Jackson Brice appears as the Shocker in Spider-Man: Homecoming (2017), portrayed by Logan Marshall-Green. This version is a member of Adrian Toomes' criminal enterprise and wields a modified version of Crossbones' vibration-emitting gauntlet. After being fired by Toomes for attracting Spider-Man's attention, Brice threatens to expose the operation to Toomes' family. While trying to intimidate Brice, Toomes inadvertently kills him before giving the gauntlet and Shocker mantle to Herman Schultz.

=== Merchandise ===
The Spectacular Spider-Man's incarnation of Montana / Shocker received an action figure in Hasbro's "Spider Charged" series in 2009.
