= Enforcers (comics) =

Marvel Comics fictional group

The Enforcers
- Cover art for Daredevil (vol. 2) #102. Art by Marko Djurdjevic.

Publication information
- Publisher: Marvel Comics
- First appearance: The Amazing Spider-Man #10 (March 1964)
- Created by: Stan Lee (writer); Steve Ditko (artist)

In-story information
- Base(s): New York City
- Member(s): Montana; Ox; Fancy Dan; Snake Marston; Hammer Harrison

The Enforcers are a team of supervillains appearing in American comic books published by Marvel Comics, usually as adversaries of the superheroes Spider-Man and Daredevil. While the group's composition has changed several times, the Enforcers are traditionally depicted as a team of professional assassins consisting of Jackson "Montana" Brice, Raymond "Ox" Bloch, and Daniel "Fancy Dan" Brito.

== Publication history ==
The Enforcers first appeared in The Amazing Spider-Man #10 (March 1964), and were created by writer-editor Stan Lee and artist and co-plotter Steve Ditko.

The Enforcers appear often in the early issues of The Amazing Spider-Man, debuting in issue #10, and returning in issues #14 and 19, in which they teamed up with the Sandman. The team would go on to appear in Daredevil #356–357 and Dazzler #7–8, and fight Spider-Man again in Marvel Team-Up #39–40 and 138, Peter Parker, the Spectacular Spider-Man #19–20, Spider-Man #94–95, Spider-Man (vol. 2) #28, and elsewhere.

== Fictional team history ==
The Enforcers are a group of professional hitmen and extortionists, each with an expertise in a different and unique area of combat. They primarily operate in New York City, where they serve as hired muscle for various employers in the criminal underworld. In their first appearance, the Enforcers aided the Big Man (Frederick Foswell) in his attempt to gain control over New York's criminal gangs. They clashed with the superhero Spider-Man for the first time, and were defeated by him.

The Enforcers were subsequently employed by paranoid industrialist Norman Osborn, who hired them to shut down Malone's Flophouse in a bid to gain the land. However, the then-amnesiac Malone resident Namor the Sub-Mariner thwarted them, later destroying Osborn's construction equipment. They next aided the Green Goblin in his first unsuccessful attempt to eliminate Spider-Man, but were again defeated and jailed. Soon after that, they joined forces with the Sandman to subdue the Human Torch at a point where it was believed Spider-Man had become a coward, but are defeated by the combined might of Spider-Man and the Human Torch.

The Enforcers were hired by Lightmaster, who introduced a new Ox, Raymond Bloch's twin brother Ronald, to the team. The Enforcers are once again defeated by Spider-Man. They later battle the mutant superheroine Dazzler.

The Enforcers return with new members Sylvester "Snake" Marston and Willard "Hammer" Harrison. The Enforcers come under the employ of the Kingpin, but were defeated by Spider-Man and the then-reformed Sandman. This lineup appears only once more to fight Daredevil.

The original Ox (Raymond Bloch) returns, revived by the Kingpin. It is unclear whether it is Raymond or Ronald Bloch who appears with Montana and Fancy Dan in subsequent battles with Spider-Man and She-Hulk.

During the events known as the superhero Civil War, either Raymond or Ronald Bloch and Snake Marston are recruited into the Thunderbolts, a team of reformed villains.

Following the events of the storyline "Spider-Man: Brand New Day", the Enforcers are patrons at the Bar with No Name. They take bets with a person calling himself "the Bookie", over whether Spider-Man will show up to battle "Basher", an unknown villain who claimed to have fought Spider-Man. Spider-Man shows up, but is revealed to be Screwball in disguise when the real one shows up at the scene of the fight. The Enforcers decide to get revenge on the Bookie, capturing him. The Bookie's father calls Spider-Man for assistance and he agrees to help. Spider-Man defeats Fancy Dan and Montana and saves Ox from being flattened by a falling roller coaster. Grateful for the save, Ox agrees to come along quietly.

The Enforcers (Fancy Dan, Ox, Snake Marston, and Hammer Harrison) are reassembled by the Crime Master, who convinces them and Black Cat to assist him with breaking Hammerhead and Tombstone out of Ryker's Island. The attempted breakout is prevented by Spider-Man and Wraith. The Crime Master is revealed to be an impostor who Mister Negative had instructed to assassinate Hammerhead and Tombstone.

In the "Gang War" storyline, the Enforcers are shown to have gained control of Ridgewood, Queens. Hobgoblin and Prowler (Aaron Davis) sway the Enforcers to their side by providing them with weaponry. The Enforcers attack Miles Morales and Gust using their new weapons, but are defeated.

== Membership ==
=== Original members ===
The group originally consisted of:

- Montana - Jackson Brice is an expert lasso wielder from Bozeman, Montana, and the original leader of the Enforcers.
- Ox (Raymond Bloch) - Raymond Bloch is a brutish strongman and the twin brother of Ronald Bloch.
- Fancy Dan - Daniel Brito is a diminutive martial artist from Brooklyn who is proficient in judo, karate, and kicking.

=== Later members ===
These members were later additions to the group:

- Ox (Ronald Bloch) - A brutish strongman and Raymond Bloch's twin brother who temporarily replaced him following his death.
- Sylvester "Snake" Marston - An expert contortionist.
- Willard "Hammer" Harrison - An expert boxer who wields diamond-hard steel hammers.

== Other versions ==
=== Earth X ===
An alternate universe iteration of the Enforcers from Earth-9997 appear in Earth X, consisting of Fancy Dan, Ox, Montana, and the Vulture. These versions are Norman Osborn's bodyguards.

=== Marvel Noir ===
An alternate universe iteration of the original Enforcers from Earth-90214 appear in Spider-Man Noir. These versions are former carnies and servants of Norman Osborn.

=== MC2 ===
An alternate universe iteration of the original Enforcers from Earth-982 appear in MC2.

=== Ultimate Marvel ===
An alternate universe iteration of the original Enforcers from Earth-1610 appear in the Ultimate Marvel universe. These versions are servants of the Kingpin. Additionally, Fancy Dan is a gunslinger named Dan Crenshaw, Ox is a Black Dominican named Bruno Sanchez, and Montana is named Montana Bale and wields a whip rather than a lasso.

== In other media ==
=== Television ===
- The original Enforcers appear in the Spider-Man episode "Blueprint For Crime", consisting of Ox and Montana, the latter of whom is known as "Cowboy".
- The original Enforcers appear in The Spectacular Spider-Man, with Fancy Dan voiced by Phil LaMarr, Ox by Clancy Brown and later by Danny Trejo, and Montana by Jeff Bennett. This version of the group utilize modern weaponry, suits, and equipment. Later in the series, Montana assumes the Shocker mantle and joins the Sinister Six. In the episode "Probable Cause", Montana rejoins the Enforcers, while Dan and Ox receive powered suits from the Tinkerer.
- The original Enforcers appear in the Ultimate Spider-Man episode "Nightmare on Christmas", with Fancy Dan voiced by Steven Weber, Ox by Mark Hamill, and Montana by Troy Baker.

=== Video games ===
The Enforcers appear in Marvel Heroes. They kidnap Speedball and almost kill him before they are killed by Jean DeWolff.
