= List of Jupiter's Legacy story arcs =

This is a chronological list, by publication date, of story arcs in writer Mark Millar's American superhero comic book series Jupiter's Legacy, and its spinoff miniseries, Jupiter's Circle. The first, five-issue volume of Jupiter's Legacy premiered in April 2013, and was published monthly by Image Comics, albeit with some delays. The first, six-issue volume of the spinoff Jupiter's Circle was published in April 2015, and the first issue of that spinoff's second volume was published in November 2015.

== Jupiter's Legacy ==
=== Volume 1 ===
Issue #	Release date	Variant cover artists
1	April 24, 2013	Frank Quitely (sketch cover), J. Scott Campbell (Midtown Comics exclusive), Christian Ward, Bryan Hitch, Dave Johnson, Phil Noto, Mike Allred (second printing)
In 1932, Sheldon Sampson, a patriotic American who lost everything in the Wall Street Crash of 1929, is driven to charter a boat to a mysterious island west of Cape Verde that appeared to him in a dream. Believing that the island holds gifts that will mean salvation for a country needing heroes, he journeys there with five other people, including his brother Walter, his fiancée, Grace, and some old friends from college. What they find there turns them into the first six original superheroes, and the originators of a dynasty of superheroes that tries to use their superhuman abilities to help others. Decades later in 2013, conflict develops between Walter, who believes that they should take a more direct approach to end the Great Recession and tell President Barack Obama what he should be doing in his second term, and Sheldon, who is adamant that superheroes' moral responsibility is to obey the country's elected leaders. Sheldon and Grace, who are now married, are also troubled by their children Brandon and Chloe, who have inherited powers of their own, but instead of following in their parents' footsteps as heroes, lead lives of celebrity endorsement deals, superhero groupies and drugs, which leads to an overdose on Chloe's part.
2	June 26, 2013	Bryan Hitch, Jock, Amy Reeder (Midtown Comics Exclusive)
After a botched attempt by a drunken Brandon to use his powers to help others nearly ends in catastrophe, Sheldon intervenes and excoriates his son for his irresponsibility, dismissing the humiliated Brandon as a shallow celebrity. Meanwhile, Chloe survives her overdose but learns that she is pregnant and tells her drug trafficker boyfriend Hutch, who is both the child's father and the son of the world's greatest supervillain, that she will move back into her parents' Encino, Los Angeles home for a few months on the advice of her addiction counselor. After Sheldon forbids Walter from presenting his economic ideas to the President's cabinet, Walter approaches Brandon and convinces him to help him depose Sheldon as the leader of the superheroes.
3	August 28, 2013	Bryan Hitch, Sean Phillips
Sheldon orders Hutch to stay away from Chloe, informing him that he and Grace will not allow a drug trafficker to raise their grandchild. When Hutch offers to end his criminal life and pursue a legitimate one, a skeptical Sheldon says he once made the mistake of trusting Hutch's father, which ended in disaster. Walter and Brandon lead the other superheroes in an attack upon Sheldon and Grace, murdering them and prompting Chloe and Hutch to become fugitives.
4	January 1, 2014	Bryan Hitch, Ian McQue
In a flashback, Sheldon and his friends explore the island and encounter aliens who grant them superhuman abilities. In the present, the story has jumped forward nine years to show Chloe, Hutch and their eight-year-old genius son Jason trying to live inconspicuous lives in Australia while hiding from Brandon, Walter and the other superheroes, who have taken over the world and created a police state. Although Chloe and Hutch have raised Jason to fake mediocre performances in both academic and extracurricular activities to avoid detection, he secretly uses his superhuman abilities to engage in clandestine heroics. Meanwhile, Brandon is troubled by the street riots and food shortages that characterize the regime he and Walter have created, as well as their inability to find Chloe. Walter urges him not to lose faith in their work, and also reveals that suspicious activity in Australia may lead to Chloe, and that "the professionals" will look into it.
5	January 14, 2015	Bryan Hitch, Duncan Fegredo
Jason's secret is deduced by his schoolmates and his mother, and when he falls victim to a trap laid by the U.S. government's hunter of superhuman refugees, Barnabas Wolfe, his parents are brought out of hiding to rescue him, thus blowing their cover. Afterwards, the Hutchences resolve to round up Hutch's criminal friends and mount a resistance against Walter and Brandon, knowing that the latter's forces outnumber them five to one.

=== Volume 2 ===
Issue #	Release date	Variant cover artists
1	June 29, 2016	Frank Quitely, Jae Lee, Mike Mayhew, Rob Liefeld
In Santa Fe in 1991, George Hutchence (aka Skyfox) meets his son, Hutch, for the first time. When Hutch tells his father that Blue-Bolt is his favorite superhero, George builds him a power rod just like Blue-Bolt's out of a flashlight and other improvised parts, before being confronted by Walter and other superheroes. In 2020, Hutch and Chloe recruit several supercriminals from around the globe, including Tornado, Neutrino, Shockwave, Light Girl, the Wood King, Automaton, Jack Frost and Tattoo. To free their final, crucial recruit, Repro, from his Dubai prison, Jason confronts Raikou, who guards Repro.
2	July 27, 2016	
The rebels attack Raikou as a diversion in order to stage their breakout of the imprisoned Repro. It is revealed that Raikou is Walter Sampson's daughter, that both she and Repro have the same telepathic powers he does, and that the rebels intend to employ both telepaths against Walter and his regime. At a presentation of a new type of engine invented by Walter's son, Jules, to the American auto industry in Detroit, a member of a Baptist-Jihadi alliance detonates a bomb, prompting an enraged Brandon to conquer China (despite that country's lack of complicity in the event), and take control of the global economy. At Skyfox's old headquarters in Africa, as the rebels consider their next move, Jason says that his meta gene scanner has located Skyfox.
3	August 31, 2016	
Hutch, Chloe and Jason journey to George Hutchence's hideaway in Russia to seek his help freeing all the captured superhumans from the Supermax prison George designed, but George, who feels that his attempts to fight oppression were not appreciated by the public, refuses, believing the public deserves to be ruled by corrupt leaders. He also rebuffs the trio when Jason makes a remark about George's abandonment of Hutch as a child. As the rebels plan an attack on the prison, Chloe proposes marriage to Hutch. Having had a change of heart, George appears at the rebels' hideout to join them in their mission.
4	October 12, 2016	
After Walter's son Jules finds Jason's metahuman gene detecting satellite on the Moon, he repairs it, allowing Walter and Brandon's team to attack the rebels' otherwise invisible headquarters floating over Florida. This spurs Hutch and Jason to enact their Supermax breakout plan prematurely, while the rebels, aided by George, engage Walter and Brandon's forces in a furious battle, which sees Walter fatally incinerate George. Distracted by their attempt to rescue the occupants of a jetliner attacked by Walter, Hutch and Chloe are overpowered by Walter and his loyalists.
5	July 5, 2017	
In the final battle, Brandon and his cohorts attack Chloe, while Walter fends off both a telepathic attack by Repro and the high-tech tactics of Hutch's power rod, which Hutch teleports into Walter's head, killing him. Jason and Neutrino free the prisoners at the Supermax prison, who then join the battle, leading to the defeat of Brandon and his allies. The victors remove their enemies' superhuman abilities and have them imprisoned. Hutch, Chloe and Jason decide to resume their parents' work by taking on the mantle of Skyfox, Lady Liberty, and the Utopian, respectively, realizing that secret identities allow the heroes to live humbly among those they protect. They also vow to remain autonomous of both governments and corporations, so that both boardrooms and alleyways are subject to scrutiny.

== Jupiter's Circle ==
=== Volume 1 ===
Issue	Release date
1	April 8, 2015
In 1959, Dr. Richard Conrad is a neo-natal surgeon at St. Thomas’ Presbyterian Hospital by day, and in his spare time, he is Blue-Bolt, one of the original six superheroes who gained superhuman powers on a mysterious island in 1932, and a member of the superhero team known as the Union. He also leads a secret life as a closeted homosexual who risks ruining his reputation by patronizing male prostitutes. His teammate, Walter Sampson, suggests considering a proposal by the FBI to make the Union a U.S. government division answerable only to FBI Director J. Edgar Hoover himself and the President, but the other teammates reject the idea, believing that the team should be separate from political entities, and distrusting Hoover, whom they believe wishes to gain information on the team that he can use to blackmail and control them. This fear is borne out when Hoover privately confronts Richard with photographic evidence of his homosexual activities, and threatens to ruin his life if Richard does not divulge his teammates’ secret identities.
2	May 6, 2015
In response to Hoover’s blackmail, Richard attempts suicide. He survives his attempt, in part due to the intervention of his teammate Fitz, and decides to stand up to Hoover’s bullying by refusing to accede to his threats. Hoover then drops the matter, and even relinquishes all of his evidence to Richard. It is revealed that Hoover did this after Richard’s teammate George Hutchence blackmailed Hoover himself with photographic evidence of Hoover’s own homosexual liaisons.
3	June 3, 2015
Union team member Fitz, also known as The Flare, is married with three children, but when he meets a 19-year-old non-superpowered civilian named April Kelly following a battle in the Midwest, Fitz, feeling that he has drifted apart from his wife Joyce, whom he met when they were 21, begins an affair with April. He then takes April on as a sidekick, setting up a job and an apartment for her. Fitz lobbies for April to join the Union, but his teammates refuse and order him to end his affair with her. Wanting to put his children's needs above his own happiness, Fitz breaks up with April, but then has a change of heart, and divorces Joyce in order to propose to April, who accepts. After the divorce, Joyce's oldest son reassures her that she will always have him and his two siblings, and ominously states that one day Fitz will get what is coming to him.
4	July 2, 2015
As Fitz's family and the Union deal with the fallout of him leaving his wife and children, the insecure Fitz grows increasingly alienated from April's peers, with whom he has nothing in common. His oldest child, Peter, is beginning to develop superhuman strength and speed, and vows to kill his father one day, but during a battle with superbeings from a parallel Earth, Fitz is left a paraplegic. When April leaves him, Fitz realizes the error he made in leaving his wife Joyce, who reunites with him to take care of him, pleasing Peter.
5	August 7, 2015
George Hutchence (aka Skyfox) meets a model, Sunny, who becomes his girlfriend. She grows increasingly concerned about his alcoholism and erratic, childish behavior, including disrespectful and violent outbursts towards Richard and Walter. When George proposes marriage to Sunny, she refuses, stating that she needs someone more mature as a husband, and subsequently begins an affair with Walter.
6	September 2, 2015
Following her breakup with George, Sunny continues her romantic relationship with Walter. When George discovers this, he is outraged, and believes that Walter has used his telepathic powers to influence her. After Walter denies this, and Sheldon suggests to George that Sunny broke up with him due to his behavior, George cuts off all ties to the team, leaves his estate to Sheldon, and moves to Kentucky, where he lives incognito. Walter marries Sunny, and completes the Supermax prison for supercriminals that George designed.

=== Volume 2 ===
Issue	Release date
1	November 25, 2015
As Sheldon and his first wife, a television executive named Jane, enjoy their lives together, Grace, having harbored an unrequited crush on Sheldon years earlier, divides her time between superheroics and her job as a partner in a law firm while unsuccessfully looking to meet someone herself. On the Jovian moon Europa, Sheldon is led by a signal broadcast by a handheld transmitter to an ancient abandoned underground city.
2	December 23, 2015
In 1965, George, having traveled the country for three years, has joined the Beatnik culture, associating with figures such as Jack Kerouac, William S. Burroughs and Gregory Corso. Having realized that Sunny left him not because of Walter, but because he was a narcissistic child, he believes that as a superhero, he was a pawn of the political elite, to the detriment of the underclass, whose plight has affected him. Burroughs suggests that the aliens gave George and his friends superhuman powers not to perpetuate the current system, but to destroy it and replace it with something better. Meanwhile, Fitz has regained enough of his strength to resume his career as The Flare. At a press conference, Sheldon/The Utopian tells the press that the Union will leave sensitive issues like the riots to local law enforcement, much to Walter's dismay. When the riots worsen, George decides to intervene, dispatching police officers, and telling the rioters to loot whatever they can.
3	January 27, 2016
George continues his criminal activities, which include holding United States Vice President Hubert Humphrey hostage, announcing publicly that he will not release him until President Lyndon Johnson ends the Vietnam War. Although the Union resolves to confront George and imprison him for his crimes, Sheldon later finds himself affected by a conversation with Ayn Rand, and her interpretation of the Union's conflict with George. He also declines an offer by John D. Rockefeller III to father Rockefeller's next child through artificial insemination in exchange for Rockefeller donating half his fortune to a charity of Sheldon's choice. Meanwhile, a supercriminal named Dr. Jack Hobbs is released from the Supermax prison, and plots against the Union, building a directed energy weapon that takes away Sheldon and Grace's superhuman powers and gives them to him and his henchmen.
4	March 9, 2016
Hobbs continues his vendetta against the Union, stealing Fitz and Richard's powers and sending all four Union members into an antimatter universe. George intervenes, restoring the Union's powers and helping them escape the antimatter universe and defeat Hobbs and his henchmen.
5	April 20, 2016
Sheldon and other Union members welcome George back into the group, although Walter has reservations. George apologizes to Walter for the years of antagonism that he inflicted upon him, and for his accusation that Walter used his telepathy to make Sunny fall in love with Walter. Walter, however, admits that he did in fact do this very thing, in retaliation for years of George's abuse. Though George relates this to the others, his rage over Walter's revelation leads to a brawl that ends when the Union manages to subdue George, with questions remaining over whether Walter did in fact use his powers as George indicated.
6	May 18, 2016
George is imprisoned for his actions. Sheldon accepts Walter's assurances that George is lying about Walter having used his telepathy on Sunny, but pondering George's views that superheroes are privileged agents of the status quo, as well as Rockefeller's standing offer to father his child, weigh heavily on Sheldon. He forms a rapport with the imprisoned Jack Hobbs, through which both men focus their efforts on helping others. Sheldon resolves to give away his money to charity and get a job, but this spurs Jane to divorce him, as she finds him too perfect a person to live with. As the Utopian embarks on a worldwide campaign of charity, he inspires people around the world. George breaks out of the Supermax prison, intent on killing Walter, while Sheldon and Grace become a couple, and bear two children, Brandon and Chloe.

== Jupiter's Legacy: Requiem ==
=== Volume 1 ===
Issue	Release date
1	June 16, 2021
2	July 21, 2021
3	August 18, 2021
4	September 15, 2021
5	October 27, 2021
6	December 15, 2021
