= Evernight =

Evernight may refer to:

- Evernight (album), an album by the Finnish heavy metal band Battlelore
- Evernight (novel), a young adult novel by Claudia Gray
- Evernight (series), a series of novels by Claudia Gray
- Evernight, a character in Honkai: Star Rail
