= Phil Noto =

American painter and comic book artist

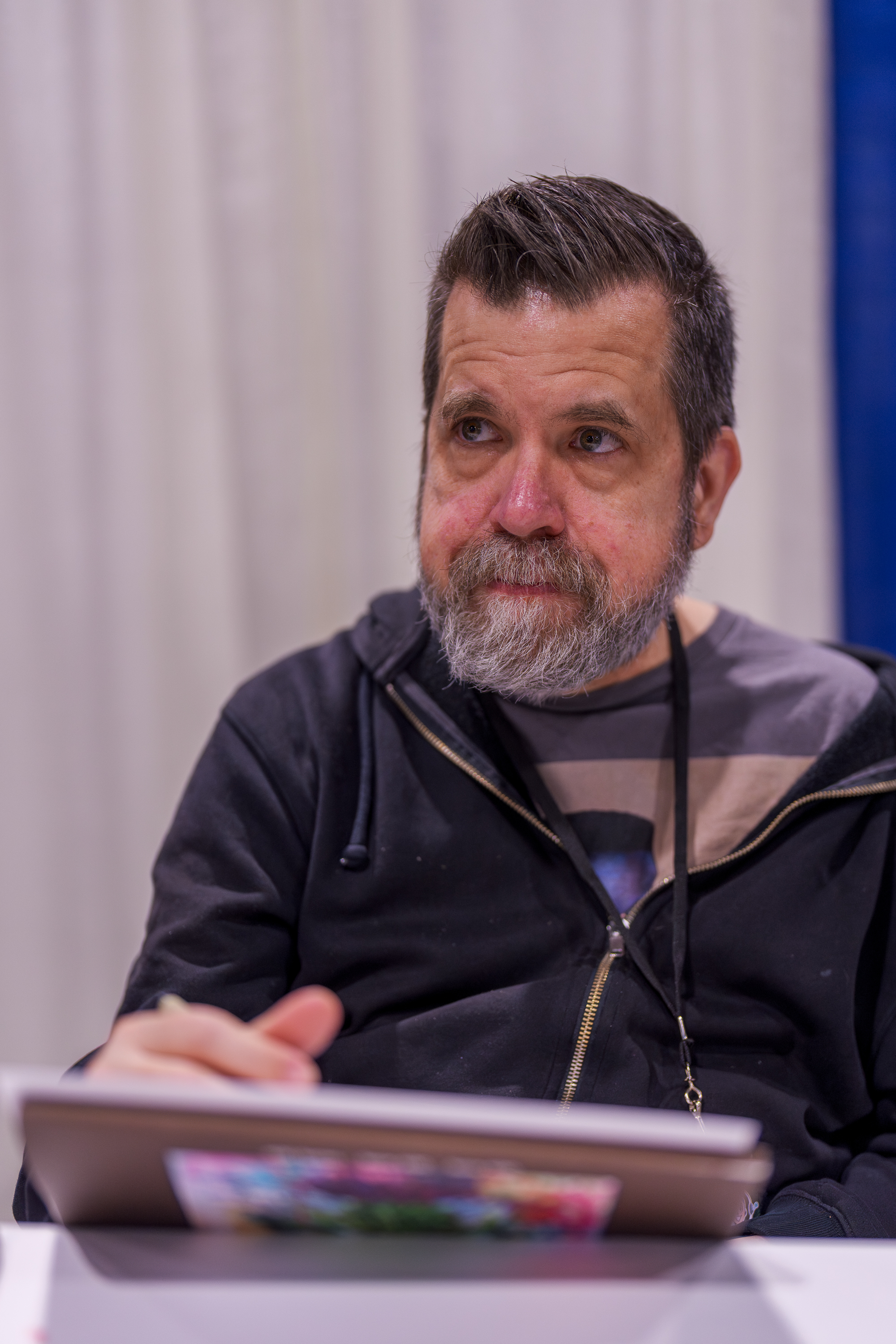
- Noto at GalaxyCon Richmond in 2026
- Areas: Penciller, Inker, Colourist

Phil Noto is an American painter and comic book artist who is known for his work on such titles as Jonah Hex, X-23, Uncanny X-Force and, more recently, Black Widow. His work on The Infinite Horizon (a modern retelling of The Odyssey) with Gerry Duggan earned him an Eisner nomination for Best New Series. Noto has also worked as a concept artist for video games such as BioShock.

== Career ==
According to Noto, he attended the Ringling School of Art & Design for three years before gaining an internship at Disney. This internship turned into a ten-year career there as a clean-up artist for animated work, including The Lion King, Pocahontas, The Hunchback of Notre Dame, Mulan, Tarzan, Lilo & Stitch, and Brother Bear. He began to get jobs as an artist for Marvel and DC, as well as Image and Dark Horse Comics after selling some of his fan art. One painting in particular was purchased by fellow comic book artist Tim Townsend, which sparked a friendship between the two.

Noto describes his art as "retro paperback cover" style and cites Adam Hughes, Robert McGinnis, Mike Mignola and Alex Toth as influences.

== Bibliography ==
=== Interior art ===
==== Marvel Comics ====
- Mystic Arcana: Sister Grimm: "To Try in Vein" (with C. B. Cebulski, one-shot, 2007)
- X-Men Origins: Iceman (with Roberto Aguirre-Sacasa, one-shot, 2009)
- Avengers: The Origin #1-5 (with Joe Casey, 2010)
- Wolverine and Jubilee #1-4 (with Kathryn Immonen, 2010)
- X-23 #13-16, 20-21 (with Marjorie Liu, 2011–2012)
- Uncanny X-Force #24, 26–27, 31-35 (with Rick Remender, 2012–2013)
- SpyGal: Thrills, Frills & Espionage (with James Asmus, one-shot, 2012)
- Thunderbolts (vol. 2) #7-11 (with Daniel Way, 2013)
- Black Widow (with Nathan Edmondson, 2014–2015)
- Star Wars: Chewbacca #1-5 (with Gerry Duggan, miniseries, 2015)
- Star Wars: Poe Dameron (with Charles Soule, ongoing, 2016–)
- Inhumans - Once and Future Kings (2017)
- Daredevil #606-612 (with Charles Soule, 2018)
- Cable (vol. 4) (with Gerry Duggan, March 2020)

==== DC Comics ====
- Batgirl:
  - "Bruce Wayne: Fugitive, Part Five" (with Kelley Puckett, in #27, 2002)
  - "Raising Cain" (with Scott Peterson, in Secret Files and Origins #1, 2002)
- Jonah Hex #10, 16–17, 19–20, 22 (with Jimmy Palmiotti and Justin Gray, 2006–2007)
- Chuck (Wildstorm):
  - "Captain Awesome's Tips for Being Awesome!" (with Zev Borow and Peter Johnson, co-feature, in #1, 2008)
  - "Untitled" (with Scott Rosenbaum, co-feature, in #2, 2008)
  - "Buy Noir" (with Matt Lau, co-feature, in #3, 2008)
  - "Untitled" (with Zev Borow, co-feature, in #4, 2008)
  - "Buy More Odyssey" (with Max Denby, co-feature, in #5, 2008)
  - "Captain Awesome, Chapter One Volume One: "A New Beginning" (The Origin Story)" (with Zev Borow, co-feature, in #6, 2009)
- Superman/Supergirl: Maelstrom #1-5 (with Jimmy Palmiotti and Justin Gray, 2009)
- Get Christie Blaze (co-feature, Wildstorm):
  - "Part One" (with Christos Gage, in WildCats #6, 2009)
  - "Part Two" (with Christos Gage, in The Authority #6, 2009)
  - "Part Three" (with Christos Gage, in Gen^{13} #26, 2009)
  - "Part Four" (with Christos Gage, in Stormwatch: P.H.D. #18, 2009)
- Batman/Doc Savage Special: "Bronze Night" (with Brian Azzarello, one-shot, 2010)
- House of Mystery #28: "Peace" (with Matthew Sturges, Vertigo, 2010)
- Before Watchmen: Minutemen #1-6 (colours, with Darwyn Cooke, 2012–2013)

==== Image Comics ====
- Gun Candy #2: "Mardi Gras, Act 4: Bourbon & St. Peter" (with Chuck Dixon, 2006)
- The Infinite Horizon #1-6 (with Gerry Duggan, 2007–2011)
- Pilot Season: 7 Days from Hell (with Bryan Edward Hill and Robert Levine, one-shot, Top Cow, 2010)

==== Dark Horse Comics ====
- Grendel: Red, White and Black #3: "Devilish Escapades" (with Matt Wagner, Maverick, 2002)
- Angel and Faith #5: "In Perfect Harmony" (with Christos Gage, 2011)
- Buffy the Vampire Slayer Season Nine #6 (Dark Horse, 2011)
- Creator-Owned Heroes #1-4: "TriggerGirl 6" (with Jimmy Palmiotti and Justin Gray, 2012)
- Ghost (with Kelly Sue DeConnick):
  - "Resurrection Mary" (in Dark Horse Presents #13-15, 2012)
  - "Phantom Finders" (in #0, 2012)
  - "In the Smoke and Din" (in #1-4, 2012–2013)

==== Other ====
- Beautiful Killer #1-3 (with Jimmy Palmiotti, Black Bull, 2002–2003)
- Danger Girl (with J. Scott Campbell and Andy Hartnell, Cliffhanger):
  - Hawaiian Punch (one-shot, 2003)
  - Viva Las Danger (one-shot, 2004)
- The Many Worlds of Tesla Strong (with Alan Moore, Peter K. Hogan and various artists, one-shot, ABC, 2003)
- The New West #1-2 (with Jimmy Palmiotti, Black Bull, 2005)
- G.I. Joe: Scarlett: Declassified (with Mike O'Sullivan, Devil's Due, one-shot, 2006)
- Halo Wars: Genesis (with Eric Nylund, graphic novel, Microsoft Game Studios, 2009)
- Bart Simpson's Treehouse of Horror #18: "Margemary's Baby" (with Gerry Duggan, Bongo, 2012)

=== Covers only ===
- Birds of Prey #32-35, 37–55, Secret Files '03 (DC Comics, 2001–2003)
- Codename: Knockout #5-6 (Vertigo, 2001)
- Batman #605 (DC Comics, 2002)
- Mystic Volume 2 tpb (CrossGen, 2002)
- Scion Volume 3 tpb (CrossGen, 2002)
- Captain Marvel #4 (Marvel, 2003)
- Hellblazer Special: Lady Constantine #1-4 (Vertigo, 2003)
- X-Men Unlimited #45 (Marvel, 2003)
- Vampi Vicious #1 (Harris, 2003)
- Bart Simpson's Treehouse of Horror #9 (Bongo, 2003)
- Robin #118 (DC Comics, 2003)
- Wonder Woman #198-199 (DC Comics, 2004)
- Hellboy: Weird Tales #7 (Dark Horse, 2004)
- Wildguard: Casting Call #6 (Image, 2004)
- Vampirella Comics Magazine #3 (Harris, 2004)
- Man with the Screaming Brain #1 (Dark Horse, 2005)
- Jonah Hex #3 (DC Comics, 2006)
- G.I. Joe: America's Elite #12 (Devil's Due, 2005–2006)
- The Oz/Wonderland Chronicles #1 (Buymetoys.com, 2006)
- Painkiller Jane #2 (Dynamite, 2006)
- Back to Brooklyn #1 (Image, 2008)
- Batgirl #1-7 (DC Comics, 2009–2010)
- Captain America: Theater of War: To Soldier On #1 (Marvel, 2009)
- Hunter's Fortune #1-4 (Boom! Studios, 2009–2010)
- World's Finest #1-4 (DC Comics, 2009–2010)
- Mindfield #0-6 (Aspen, 2010–2011)
- Gen^{13} #36 (Wildstorm, 2010)
- Stan Lee's Soldier Zero #1-2 (Boom! Studios, 2010)
- I am an Avenger #3 (Marvel, 2011)
- Superboy #2-3 (DC Comics, 2011)
- Artifacts #6 (Top Cow, 2011)
- Dollhouse: Epitaphs #1 (Dark Horse, 2011)
- Namor: The First Mutant #6-10 (Marvel, 2011)
- Widowmaker #3-4 (Marvel, 2011)
- Falling Skies #3 (Dark Horse, 2011)
- Halo: Fall of Reach - Boot Camp hc (Marvel, 2011)
- Dollhouse #1-5 (Dark Horse, 2011)
- Road Rage: Throttle #1-4 (IDW Publishing, 2012)
- Higher Earth #1-4 (Boom! Studios, 2012)
- Fanboys vs. Zombies #1 (Boom! Studios, 2012)
- The Hypernaturals #1 (Boom! Studios, 2012)
- Steed and Mrs. Peel #0 (Boom! Studios, 2012)
- Hit-Girl #1 (Icon, 2012)
- Invisible Scarlet O'Neil gn (New Legend, 2012)
- Before Watchmen: Ozymandias #2 (DC Comics, 2012)
- Ultimate X-Men #15 (Marvel, 2012)
- Astonishing X-Men #54-68 (Marvel, 2012–2013)
- Freelancers #1 (Boom! Studios, 2012)
- Grace Randolph's Supurbia #1 (Boom! Studios, 2012)
- Journey into Mystery #646 (Marvel, 2013)
- Jupiters Legacy #1 (Image, 2013)
- Star Wars: Lost Stars (Del Rey, 2015)
- Fantastic Four: First Steps (Marvel, 2025)
