= Wildsiderz =

Comic book series

- Cover art for Wildsiderz #1 (August 2005) by J. Scott Campbell

Publication information
- Publisher: Wildstorm Productions
- Schedule: Monthly
- Format: Miniseries
- Publication date: October 2005 - December 2005
- No. of issues: Three (including issue #0)
- Main character(s): Derek Styler, Jessica Jennings, Katrina Summers, Zachary Hamilton, William Boome, Mirra Martin, Tyberious Spydre, Janyne

Creative team
- Created by: J. Scott Campbell, Andy Hartnell
- Written by: J. Scott Campbell, Andy Hartnell
- Penciller: J. Scott Campbell
- Inker: Avalon Studios
- Colorist: Edgar Delgado

Wildsiderz is a comic book series created by J. Scott Campbell and Andy Hartnell, and published by Wildstorm Productions. It is the second series created by Campbell and Hartnell after their successful Danger Girl. It features a group of teenagers who, through newly developed holographic technology, can take on the powers of animals to fight a mad scientist.

It was originally planned as a five-issue limited series (six, if issue #0 is included), but it ceased publication after issue #2.

== Primary characters ==
- Derek Styler - A skateboard fanatic, computer genius, and insect freak, Styler helped create the holographic technology used by the Wildsiderz. His holographic "wildside" is the dragonfly, which allows him to fly at hypersonic speeds, see with 360-degree vision, and fire blasts of energy from his "tail".
- Jessica "Jess" Jennings - Styler's best friend (though she wishes he would see her as a girlfriend), Jess is a volunteer at an animal refuge. She is the teams resident animal expert. Her "wildside" is the eagle, which allows her to fly at amazing speeds (she has yet to find her top velocity) and grab or shred objects with her foot talons.
- Katrina "Kat" Summers - Head cheerleader, Kat was actually a little clumsy, and wanted the Wildsiderz power to help her in her acrobatics. Her "wildside" is the panther, which gives her amazing agility, incredible balance, deadly claws, and superhuman hearing.
- Zachary "Zak" Hamilton - The resident all-star athlete, Zak is a football player and Kat's boyfriend. He had Styler use data taken from a special effects studio to create his "wildside", the velociraptor, which gives him incredible running speed, slashing talons, and a powerful bite.
- William "Bam" Boome - A big burly jock with more muscles than brains, Bam is Zak's best friend. He loves to eat and party. His "wildside" is the gorilla, which gives him supheruman strength and dexterity.
- Mirra Martin - The super-genius who helped Styler create his holographic tech, Mirra used a wheelchair, until she used the holographic tech to restore her ability to walk. She has no "wildside", but has a pair of hard-light holographic "legs" which are superimposed over her real legs, enabling her to walk, run, or jump better than an Olympic athlete.
- Tyberious Spydre - Evil genius who used the Wildsiderz technology to create holographic monster (Terror-Bytes) who obey his commands. He hates Mirra.
- Janyne - Tyberious's assistant and bodyguard. She was given Wildsiderz tech to better serve her boss. Her "wildside" is the mantis, which gives her lightning-fast reflexes, and sword-like pincers.
