= Into the Dark =

Into the Dark may refer to:

- Into the Dark (film), a 2012 American horror film
- "Into the Dark", an episode of Armchair Theatre
- Into the Dark (Ninjago), an episode of Ninjago
- Into the Dark (TV series), a 2018–2021 American horror anthology series
- Star Wars: Into the Dark, a 2021 novel by Claudia Gray
- Into the Dark, a 2008 novel by Peter Abrahams
- Into the Dark, a 1999 novel by Victor Kelleher
