= Claudia Gray =

American author

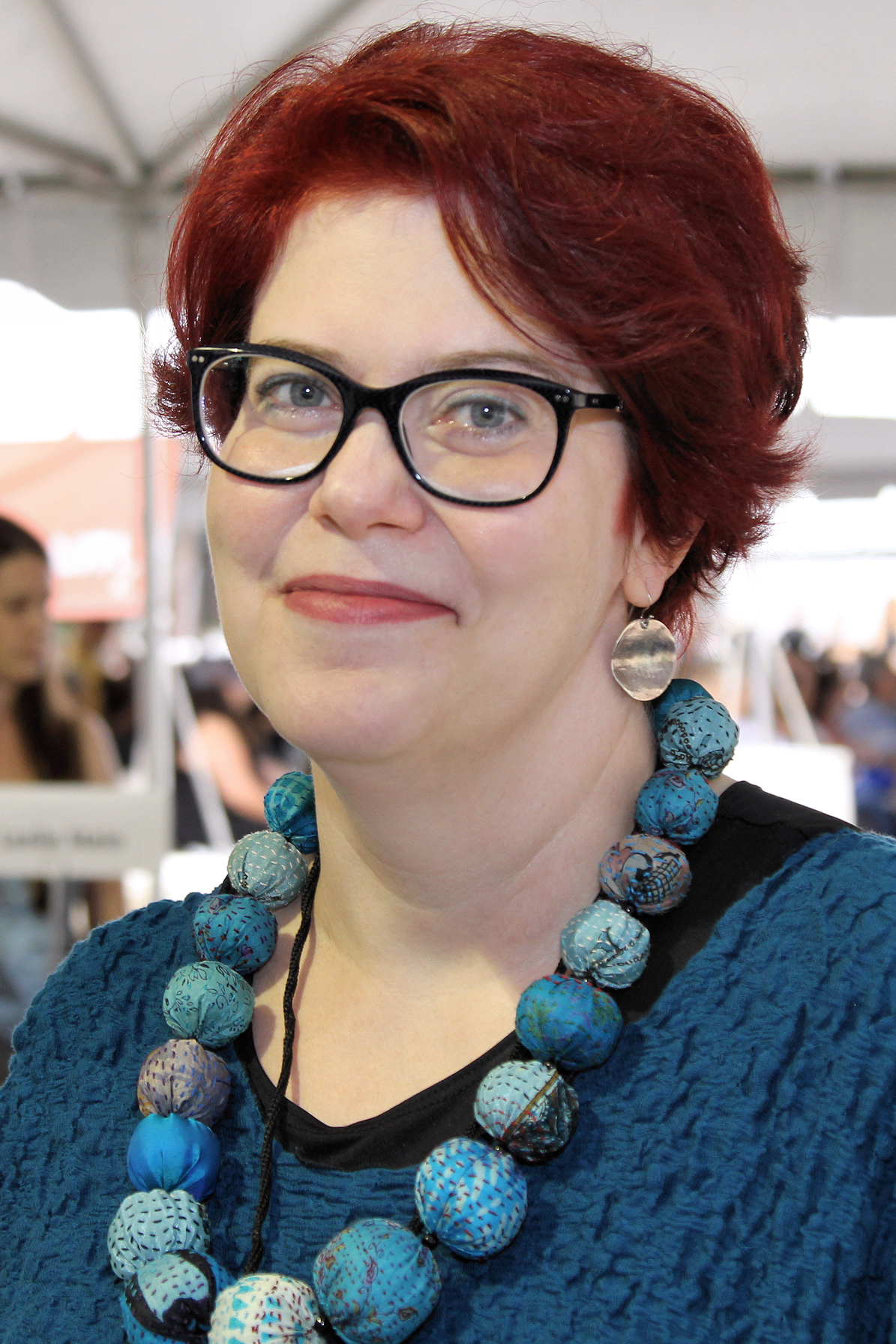
- Gray at the 2017 Texas Book Festival
- Born: Amy Vincent
- Occupation: Novelist

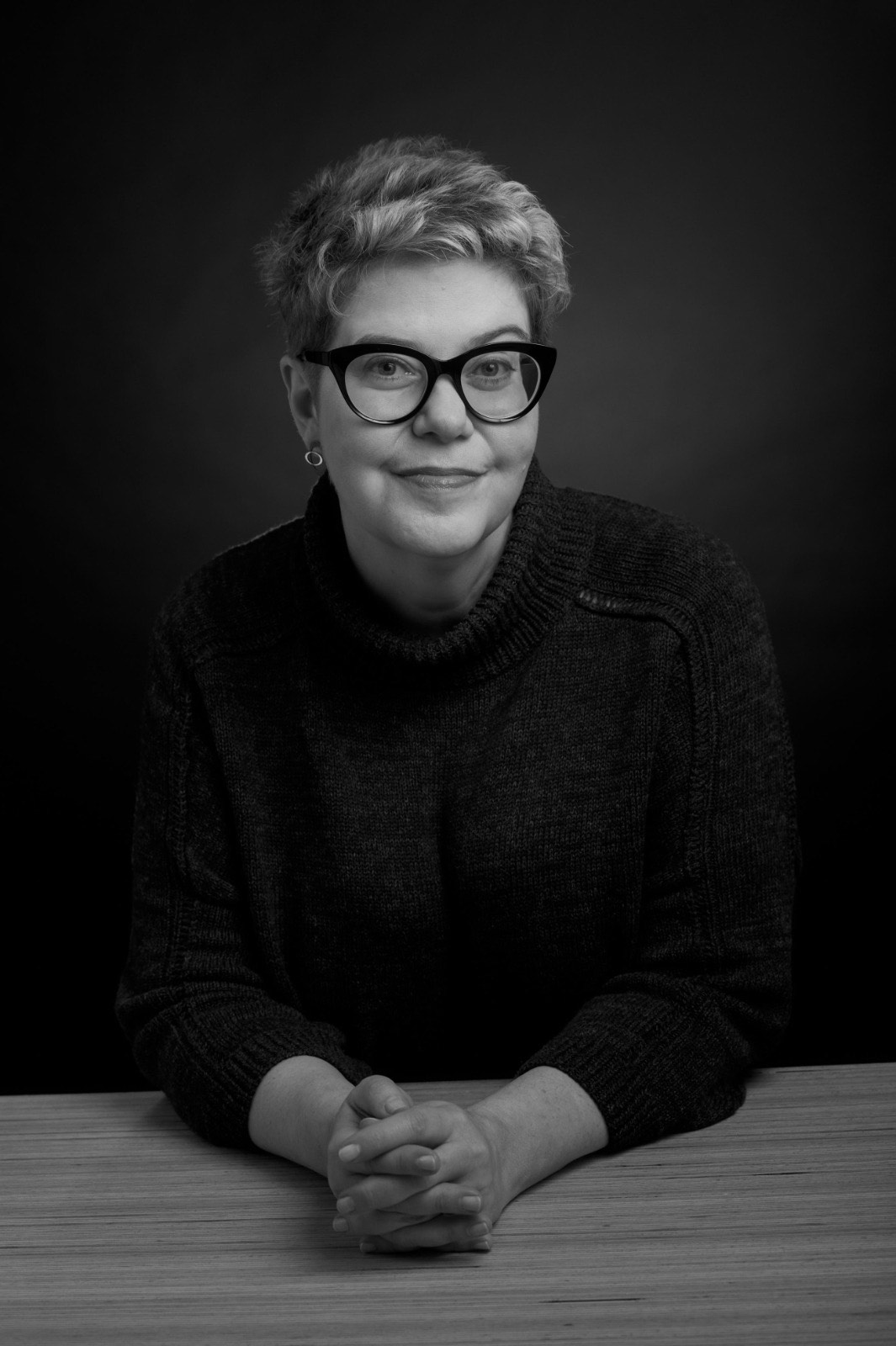
Author photo of Claudia Gray in 2025

Claudia Gray is the pseudonym of Amy Vincent, an American novelist. She writes in the science fiction, fantasy, historical fiction, cozy mystery, paranormal romance, and young adult fiction. She is best known for her Evernight series and for her Star Wars novels Lost Stars; Bloodline; Leia, Princess of Alderaan; Into the Dark; and The Fallen Star.

== Career ==
Evernight was published in 2008. The second book in the Evernight series, Stargazer, was published in March 2009 and was ranked fourth in the children's chapter books category of The New York Times Best Seller list in April 2009.

Beginning in 2018, Gray was one of the authors invited to work on the Star Wars: The High Republic publishing initiative.

Gray's novel The Late Mrs. Willoughby was named as one of the best mystery novels of 2023 by The Wall Street Journal.

== Personal life ==
Claudia Gray holds dual citizenship in the United States and Italy, and as of mid-2024, resides in Italy with her husband, Paul.

== Publications ==
=== Constellation series ===
- Defy the Stars (2017)
- Defy the Worlds (2018)
- Defy the Fates (2019)

=== DC Comics ===
- House of El Book One: The Shadow Threat (2021)
- House of El Book Two: The Enemy Delusion (2022)
- House of El Book Three: The Treacherous Hope (2023)

=== Evernight series ===
- Evernight (2008)
- Stargazer (2009)
- Hourglass (2010)
- Afterlife (2011)
- Balthazar (2012)

=== Firebird series ===
- A Thousand Pieces of You (2014)
- Ten Thousand Skies Above You (2015)
- A Million Worlds with You (2016)

=== Spellcaster series ===
- Spellcaster (2013)
- The First Midnight Spell (2013)
- Steadfast (2014)
- Sorceress (2015)

=== Star Wars novels ===
- Star Wars: Lost Stars (September 2015)
- Star Wars: Bloodline (May 2016)
- Star Wars: Leia, Princess of Alderaan (September 2017)
- Star Wars: Master and Apprentice (April 2019)
- Star Wars: Into the Dark (February 2021)
- Star Wars: The Fallen Star (January 2022)
- Star Wars: Into the Light (April 2025)
- Star Wars: Princess of the Rebellion (May 2027)

=== Mr. Darcy & Miss Tilney Mystery series ===
- The Murder of Mr. Wickham (2022)
- The Late Mrs. Willoughby (2023)
- The Perils of Lady Catherine de Bourgh (2024)
- The Rushworth Family Plot (2025)
- The Fatal Unpleasantness at Netherfield (2026)
- Here Lies Sir Walter Elliot (2027)

=== The Haunted Mansion novels ===
- The Haunted Mansion: Storm & Shade (September 2023)

=== The X-Files novels ===
- The X-Files: Perihelion (2024)

=== Standalone novels ===
- Fateful (2011)
- Jane Austen's The Watsons, As Continued by Claudia Gray (2026)
