= Harvey Tolibao =

Filipino comic book artist

Harvey Montecillo Tolibao (born June 25, 1981, Bukidnon, Philippines) is a Filipino comic book illustrator. He is also a cover artist at Zenescope Entertainment, a comic book artist at IDW Publishing, a regular illustrator at DC Comics and an artist at Nautilus Comics.

== Education ==
Tolibao went to Bukidnon National High School for his secondary education and proceeded to study Associate in Information technology at the Cebu Institute of Technology. He went to college supporting himself, having worked on various jobs – as furniture designer, graphic artist, tattoo artist and web designer.

== Early life ==
Tolibao was born and raised in Malaybalay, Bukidnon, Philippines along with his two siblings. His proclivity towards drawing and sketching was passed down from his father, himself a successful local artist in his hometown.

Tolibao moved to Manila, the main city and capital of the Philippines, where began his rapid ascent as a comic book artist.

== Career ==
Tolibao first contributed his works to the comic industry in 2006 when he drew the twelfth issue of Dark Horse Comics’ Star Wars: Knights of the Old Republic. He sporadically worked on this project until the first quarter of 2008. Soon after that, he began his work on Iron Man: Director of S.H.I.E.L.D. Annual for Marvel Comics. This spurred into more projects with Marvel Comics, where he made several more issues and worked on more titles until the present. He since then illustrated Green Arrow, Heroes for Hire, Silver Surfer, X-men Legacy, Avengers Ensemble, Uncanny X-men, Danger Girl and Psylocke, among many others. He also inked and penciled more work for Dabel Brothers Productions, Top Cow Productions and for DC Comics.

Tolibao is also the Creative Director and Co-founder of HMT Studios Manila, a multi-talent studio for visual art entertainment. This was built along with another company, 7 HMT Studios Crew.

== Cover artworks ==
=== Zenescope Entertainment ===
- Hitlist
- GFT Realm Knights
- Demons the Unseen
- Robyn Hood Wanted

=== IDW Publishing ===
- Danger Girl Trinity

=== Nautilus Comics ===
- Cast

=== DC Comics ===
- Green Arrow DC 52
- Green Lantern Movie Prequen Sinestro
- Green Lantern New Guardians

== See also ==
- Joe Madureira
- Leinil Francis Yu
