= The Murder of Mr. Wickham =

2022 mystery novel by Claudia Gray

- First edition cover
- Author: Claudia Gray
- Language: English
- Genre: Fiction, Mystery, Historical fiction
- Publisher: Vintage Books
- Publication date: May 3, 2022
- Publication place: United States
- Pages: 320
- ISBN: 9780593313817
- Followed by: The Late Mrs. Willoughby

The Murder of Mr. Wickham is a 2022 murder mystery/historical fiction novel by American author Claudia Gray, and the first installment in the Mr. Darcy and Ms. Tilney Mystery series, a crossover between the works of Jane Austen set after the time frames of the novels.

In this book, Jonathan, the eldest son of Elizabeth Bennet and Fitzwilliam Darcy from Pride and Prejudice; and Juliet, the eldest daughter of Catherine Morland and Henry Tilney from Northanger Abbey; are introduced at a summer party where Jonathan's uncle George Wickham is murdered, and team up to solve the mystery.

The novel was published on May 3, 2022.

== Plot ==
Emma and George Knightley prepare for the arrival of numerous guests at their home of Donwell Abbey. George has invited his school friend, Fitzwilliam Darcy, Fitzwilliam's wife Elizabeth, and their eldest son Jonathan, as well as cousin Edmund Bertram and Edmund's wife Fanny. Emma has invited her cousin Colonel Brandon and his new wife Marianne, and Juliet Tilney, the teenage daughter of Catherine, a novelist Emma previously befriended. In addition, Captain Wentworth and his wife Anne have been leasing Emma's childhood home of Hartfield, but are staying at Donwell because of repairs.

The house party begins cordially, but the mood sours when George Wickham arrives at Donwell Abbey. Several of the guests bear grudges against him: in addition to his wrongdoings against Georgiana and Lydia, the Darcys blame him for the death of his daughter Susannah, which has also fractured their marriage; Captain Wentworth and George Knightley's brother John have lost their fortunes to his financial scheming; and Wickham is the rake who seduced and impregnated Colonel Brandon's first love Eliza. A rainstorm prevents Wickham from leaving, and during one rainy night, Juliet finds his corpse in the gallery.

Frank Churchill, now magistrate, is called upon to solve the murder, which has shocked the guests and the neighboring town of Highbury. He assumes that a servant or traveler has committed the crime using a nearby mace. As none of the guests are permitted to depart until the murder is solved and Jonathan and Juliet both have alibis, they resolve to investigate their fellow guests, particularly after a bloodied handkerchief is found buried in the garden. In the ensuing days, it is revealed that the Darcys, Wentworths, and Colonel Brandon had all left their rooms the night of the murder, though only Wentworth initially admits it; Wickham's room had been ransacked; Knightley had signed a surety on his brother's loans; and Wickham is blackmailing Fanny with her brother William's relationship with a fellow sailor, which he had learned from a stolen letter; the same letter is later found in the Darcy's hearth. In addition, Jonathan and Juliet deduce that a bust of Lord Nelson, not the mace, was used in the murder, and an unnamed earl — potentially the Earl of Dorchester, married to Darcy's sister Georgiana — has endorsed Wickham's scheme.

Churchill hosts a ball and invites the Donwell Abbey party, during which Jonathan and Juliet hope to find his copy of Debrett's for the earl's name. However, they find Darcy in the library holding the book implicating a different earl; he had had the same suspicion and went through Wickham's belongings but as he did not know it at the time of the murder, his motive is eliminated. Nevertheless, he castigates the two for their inappropriate investigation.

During a search of the guests' rooms, a trowel is found in Juliet's room along with a scrap of gold braid. Jonathan and Juliet present their findings to Churchill, who accepts their contributions. Brandon overhears the two discussing the gold braid and confesses to the murder. However, when Brandon incorrectly claims the mace as the murder weapon, Marianne comes forward as the true murderer and identifies the bust.

Marianne explains that she had overheard Wickham threatening Fanny; this is corroborated by Anne Wentworth, who had been speaking with Colonel Brandon about life in the military. Marianne used the bust to protect herself from Wickham's attempted assault, and later hid the handkerchief and trowel used to bury it. Elizabeth admits that she had searched Wickham's room independently and burned the letter she found to protect Fanny. Churchill confers with the gentlemen and rules the crime self-defense, allowing Marianne to live.

The ruling brings relief and reconciliation — the Bertrams, previously at odds because of their differing attitudes to William's homosexuality, mutually agree to welcome him as a brother; the Darcys forgive each other for the death of Susannah; and Marianne admires Brandon's devotion and heroism. Wickham's estate passes to Brandon's ward Beth, who relieves the Knightleys and Wentworths of their full debts. Captain Wentworth, humbled by the experience, agrees to return to sea with Anne. Marianne invites Juliet to visit Devonshire, while the remaining guests remain in touch and contrive future encounters between Juliet and Jonathan.

== Characters ==
=== Main ===
- Jonathan Darcy: The eldest son of Elizabeth and Fitzwilliam Darcy from Pride and Prejudice; the heir to Pemberley and a young man with signs of neurodivergence; he prefers to rely on the rules of etiquette to navigate social interactions.
- Juliet Tilney: The eldest daughter of Catherine and Henry Tilney from Northanger Abbey; an intelligent but sheltered young woman.

=== Donwell Abbey ===
- Emma Knightley: Originating from Emma, mistress of Donwell and consummate hostess of the house party.
- George Knightley: Originating from Emma, Emma's husband and owner of Donwell Abbey.
- Colonel Christopher Brandon: Originating from Sense and Sensibility, a cousin of Emma and a recently wed soldier. His Christian name is taken from the 1995 film adaptation.
- Marianne Brandon: Originating from Sense and Sensibility, the colonel's young wife who is concerned with his distance.
- Fitzwilliam Darcy: Originating from Pride and Prejudice, a school friend of Knightley's, father of Jonathan, and owner of Pemberley; an aloof man who has grown distant from his wife Elizabeth in recent months.
- Elizabeth Darcy: Originating from Pride and Prejudice, Darcy's wife, mistress of Pemberly and Jonathan's mother; a quick-witted woman grieving the loss of her niece Susannah.
- Edmund Bertram: Originating from Mansfield Park, a country vicar and a cousin of Knightley.
- Fanny Bertram: Originating from Mansfield Park, Edmund's tenderhearted and devout wife who reconciles her brother's homosexuality with her faith.
- Captain Frederick Wentworth: Originating from Persuasion, a naval man who is smarting from the recent loss of his fortune to Wickham's swindling.
- Anne Wentworth: Originating from Persuasion, a kindhearted woman who struggles to convince her husband to accept their losses.

=== Others ===
- George Wickham: Originating from Pride and Prejudice, a rake and swindler who has harmed many of the other characters.
- Frank Churchill: Originating from Emma, an old acquaintance of the Knightleys and the magistrate overseeing the investigation.

== Background ==
Gray has stated that the novel was inspired by Death Comes to Pemberley, but she felt that killing off a well-known major character like Mr. Wickham raised the stakes. Her background writing for Star Wars allowed her to practice writing a work with a longstanding canon.

In crafting the lead detectives, Jonathan and Juliet, Gray amalgamated traits of their respective parents, the Darcys and the Tilneys. She had sought to make Jonathan "more Darcy than Darcy", and decided to make him neurodivergent, with the understanding that the late Regency era would not recognize this.
