= Rokkin =

Publication information
- Publisher: Wildstorm
- Format: Mini-series
- Publication date: September 2006 – February 2007
- No. of issues: 6

Creative team
- Written by: Andy Hartnell
- Artist: Nick Bradshaw
- Colorist: Jim Charalampidis

Rokkin is a comic book fantasy mini series created by Andy Hartnell and Nick Bradshaw and published by Wildstorm. The series details the rise of an ordinary man named Arness, bestowed with godlike powers in his search for revenge against the tyrannical Lord Vulmax, whose minions destroyed his village and slew his wife.

== Synopsis ==
The story begins in the village of Kenopia, home to the butcher Arness, a humble man whose primary interest is wedding his love, Dalia. In order to pay for her ring, however, he works with an older man of the village, Rothian, collecting wood. Yet this most recent night is different: Rothian has summoned Arness to help him slay a Grizzlok, a gigantic, fearsome beast never known to roam so far in the north. After a bloody conflict with the beast, Arness manages to slay it, and is paid by Rothian with both a bag of emeralds and a warning: that he should flee, for the evil hordes of Lord Vulmax are growing in strength.

After their wedding, the couple decide to heed Rothian's words and flee, so Arness ventures into the woods to forage. However, while he is gone, their home is attacked and destroyed, and when Arness returns, he finds death and destruction and his beloved wife gone. As he grieves over the devastation and his loss, he is struck down by an armored assailant and knocked unconscious.

Upon waking, he becomes a slave to the inhabitants of a foreign fortress, working to build its defenses against approaching groups. This fortress serves as the setting for Arness' journey into a world containing various creatures, allies, adversaries, and magical relics. The narrative focuses on whether these items will allow him to resist Lord Vulmax.
