= Andy Hartnell =

American comic book writer

- Born: Kenosha, Wisconsin, U.S.
- Areas: Writer, Colourist
- Notable works: Danger Girl; Army of Darkness; Rokkin; Wildsiderz

Andy Hartnell is an American comic book writer and co-creator of the popular comic book series Danger Girl. He is best known for his work at Jim Lee's Wildstorm Productions.

== Career ==
Hartnell got his big break at Wildstorm Productions, where he worked as part of WildStorm FX as a colourist, and he eventually worked his way up to become writer and the co-creator of the hit Danger Girl series, which he co-created with the artist J. Scott Campbell. Hartnell and Campbell later created the teenage superhero series titled Wildsiderz. Hartnell has also teamed with artist Nick Bradshaw to write and create the cult-hit series Rokkin for DC Comics. He also wrote the Scream Award-winning Army of Darkness: Ashes to Ashes comic book series for Dynamite Entertainment.

His other work includes reteaming with J. Scott Campbell on further Danger Girl adventures and writing additional titles for IDW Publishing and Dynamite Entertainment.
