= Danger Girl =

Comic book series

- Cover art for Danger Girl #1 by J. Scott Campbell and Alex Garner

Publication information
- Publisher: Image Comics; IDW Publishing
- Schedule: Monthly
- Format: Miniseries
- Genre: Action, spy
- Publication date: March 1998–2015
- No. of issues: 7 issue original series, multiple mini series and one-shots
- Main character(s): Abbey Chase; Sydney Savage; Natalia Kassle; Silicon Valerie; Deuce; Johnny Barracuda; Sonya Savage; Zero

Creative team
- Created by: J. Scott Campbell; Andy Hartnell
- Written by: J. Scott Campbell; Andy Hartnell
- Penciller: J. Scott Campbell
- Inker: Alex Garner
- Letterer: Richard Starkings
- Colorist(s): Joe Chiodo; Martin Jimenez
- Editor: Scott Dunbier

Danger Girl is an American comic book series created by J. Scott Campbell and Andy Hartnell that started in March 1998 and is still published as a new series. The comic stars an eponymous group of female secret agents—Abbey Chase, Sydney Savage and Sonya Savage, who engage in adventures in the vein of other fictional characters like Charlie's Angels, James Bond, Indiana Jones, and Lara Croft. They are led by a former British Secret Service Agent named Deuce and guided by teenage genius Silicon Valerie.

== Characters ==
=== Main ===
Abbey Chase
Abbey is a champion marksman, virtuoso of languages, scholar of world history, and (most widely) a heart-stopping femme fatale. Though spending the majority of her young life as a loner, Abbey is both a team player and a natural leader. She began her career as a freelance treasure hunter working under the radar and outside the law. Abbey still finds herself trying to elude the many villainous characters she has crossed and outwitted in her pre-Danger Girl days. After bumping into the Danger Girls during one of her adventure-filled hunts, Abbey shepherded the ladies to victory in their first battle against the menacing Hammer Empire. Soon after, Abbey became a full-fledged member of this international covert-operations unit. She replaced Natalia Kassle as DG's field-commander.
Sydney Savage
Sydney is a sassy and vivacious Danger Girl who fittingly originates from the picturesque continent of Australia. Though often reprimanded for her wild and unorthodox ways, Sydney more often than not justifies her lawless techniques. More than any of the other Danger Girls, Sydney takes frequent advantage of her good looks, deploying her curvaceous form to distract and defeat the ladies' primarily-male nemeses. Sydney seems to have a love–hate relationship with Johnny Barracuda, who often makes sexualized passes at her which she either coyly accepts or acidicly rebuffs. Sydney also appears to have a crush on Batman/Bruce Wayne in the Batman/Danger Girl crossover.
Deuce
He is a former British Secret Service Agent who was lured away from retirement when invited to fashion and oversee the world's first all-female espionage network, a secret organization that would adopt the code name Danger Girl. His true name was never revealed throughout the series, but speculation always led the reader to believe he is James Bond, as he makes a strong resemblance to Sean Connery's incarnation of the cult-classic secret agent.
Silicon Valerie
Valerie is a teenager who graduated top of her class at Oxford, years before she could even obtain a valid driver's license. Though Valerie could have easily secured a safe and lucrative career in the field of communications technology, her love of danger led to a chance encounter with Deuce, who welcomed her into his employ as a Danger Girl-in-training. Valerie monitors the Danger Girls' status during their missions, but she secretly desires to go on such a mission herself. Her name is a play on Silicon Valley.
Johnny Barracuda
Johnny is a handsome CIA agent with a large ego and a sex drive to match. He collaborates with the Danger Girls on various missions; they seem to enjoy taking sexual potshots at each other. He has a love/hate relationship with Sydney Savage.
Secret Agent Zero
Agent Zero is a master of disguise and spy of unknown origin, besides being the only Hammer agent who has ever defected and lived to tell about it. No one knows what he looks like beneath his mysterious mask, but he appears to have a connection with Abbey Chase. He could possibly be her missing-and-presumed-dead father; he does keep a photo of Abbey, taken during her childhood, with him. It is also thought that he is originally Diabolik himself, but any reference to his own personal past was never mentioned.
Sonya Savage
Sonya is the sister of Sydney Savage, who is one of the original members of Danger Girl. Sonya received her training from the Australian secret agency ASIS. She is secretly in the employ of Veronica Fox, who does not trust the Danger Girl team to retrieve the artifact that she desires. Sonya works alongside the team, but at the end of the mission decides to stay on as a third team member. Sonya is in peak physical condition and is unparalleled in her ability with a bow and arrow. She sometimes employs trick arrows (much as those with transponders or explosive on them).
Natalia Kassle
A sultry Russian, Natalia was chosen to join the Danger Girl organization for her phenomenal combat and espionage talents, honed in the KGB, and also for her more obvious outstanding attributes. Natalia was the team's original field-commander, but she also turned out to be a double agent, secretly working for the neo-Nazi Hammer Empire. She nearly led the Danger Girls to their deaths, but was ultimately exposed and defeated. Currently she has rejoined the Danger Girls.

=== Villains ===
Major Maxim
Maxim is the monstrous mastermind and muscle behind the Hammer Empire's military forces. Once but a wounded soldier of those very forces, Maxim became an unwilling volunteer to Doctor Kharnov Von Kripplor's Übermensch (Super-Soldier) program. The only "success" of the strange procedure, Maxim soon became dependent on the mysterious blue Übermensch fluid that supplies and sustains his massive size and strength. He has never been shown without his mask, and his real name remains unknown.
Assassin X
A mysterious blind ninja who works for the Hammer Empire, he appears to have a long and complicated history with Secret Agent Zero.
Kid Dynamo
Dynamo is a villainous dwarf who has a giant grudge against Johnny Barracuda. His weapon of choice is a pair of extendable golden arms. In one appearance, Dynamo dressed himself as a miniature Adolf Hitler.
Mr. Giggles
A cadaverous man with an artificial larynx and a hand replaced with a steel claw, he acts as a straight man for Kid Dynamo.
Doctor Kharnov Von Kripplor
A scientist bent on making insane experiments for the Hammer, he is also the creator of Übermensch Serum X. Half of his face has been heavily stitched up; it seems to be either mutating, rotting or both.
The Peach
An illegal arms dealer who has ties to the Hammer Empire.
Donavin Conrad
Donavin is a cartoonish rogue who lost his right eye to Abbey Chase. Although he appears to be the stereotypical aristocratic villain, Conrad's image is largely an elaborate charade. He also wears a toupée. Donavin later lost a hand to the Joker when the Danger Girls joined forces with Batman.

== Comic miniseries and one-shots ==
Danger Girl
The original seven-issue series, illustrated and co-written by J. Scott Campbell, follows the adventures of newcomer Abbey Chase as she joins the Danger Girls to face the evil neo-Axis group known as the Hammer. The plot includes endless double crosses and fast-paced battles against villains such as the mysterious Major Maxim.
Danger Girl: Kamikaze
This two-issue manga/shōnen-style follow-up miniseries by Tommy Yune has the team back together as they join a buxom Hong Kong operative hot on the trail of stolen nuclear weaponry. This time an eastern neo-Axis syndicate known as the Kama (Japanese word for "sickle") led by the Shogunner is gathering secret technology to complete a long-lost superweapon.
Danger Girl Special
A one-shot featuring the virtual adventures of Silicon Valerie by Arthur Adams. The flip side of the book features a story with artwork by Joe Chiodo, where Abbey, Sydney and Natalia attempt to foil a heist at an art museum.
Danger Girl: Hawaiian Punch
The Danger Girl crew decide that it's time for a change in scenery and some much deserved playful bikini-clad recreation and relaxation on the beach. They head to bask in the Hawaiian sunshine, but they are soon drawn into a diabolical plot masterminded by an eccentric Hawaiian billionaire who has developed a cunning business plan that will make his new amusement park the most popular in the entire country. The girls find trouble in paradise in this one shot featuring the artwork of Phil Noto.
Danger Girl: Viva Las Danger
Featuring Phil Noto art again, the girls are back in action as the Las Vegas Strip becomes the target of a hostile takeover.
Batman/Danger Girl
The girls form an unlikely alliance with Batman as they go on assignment in Gotham City. The comic features the artwork of Leinil Francis Yu.
Danger Girl: Back in Black
Written by Andy Hartnell, this four-issue miniseries features the artwork of Nick Bradshaw. The Danger Girls are on a mission to recover a powerful and ancient Native American artifact which was stolen. It also features a new character called Ruby.
Danger Girl: Body Shots
A four-issue miniseries written by Andy Hartnell, featuring the artwork of Nick Bradshaw and Jim Charalampidis. Abbey, Sydney and company must hunt down a nefarious device that can remotely activate every nuclear missile on the planet.
Danger Girl 3-D Special
Taken from the preview issue and the first issue of the original series, illustrated and co-written by J. Scott Campbell, with some added artwork, done in 3-D.
Danger Girl and the Army of Darkness
A six-issue crossover with Dynamite Entertainment's Army of Darkness series of comics, co-published with IDW Publishing in April 2011. The Hammer Empire has returned and is using the Necronomicon Ex-Mortis to lead an army of Deadites. The heroines team up with Ash Williams in order to stop the nefarious scheme.
Danger Girl: Revolver
A four-issue miniseries written by Andy Hartnell, art by Chris Madden, colors by Jeromy Cox, published by IDW Publishing in January 2012. The female operatives deal with their newest member, Sydney's sister Sonya, while they attempt to find a Peruvian treasure.
Danger Girl/G.I. Joe
A five-issue crossover with G.I. Joe, published by IDW Publishing in July 2012. Abbey Chase and company team up with G.I. Joe in order to save Scarlett and Flint from Cobra Command.
Danger Girl: Trinity
Each of the three Danger Girls' adventures in this series is illustrated by a different artist (UK artist John Royle, American artist Brian Stelfreeze, and Canadian artist Stephen Molnar), written by Danger Girl co-creator Andy Hartnell, published by IDW Publishing in April 2013. The heroines must prevent a malevolent sultan from acquiring a valuable Egyptian crown.
Danger Girl: The Chase
A four-issue series written by co-creator Andy Hartnell and illustrated by Harvey Tolibao, cover art by American illustrator Dan Panosian and published by IDW Publishing in September 2013. Issues #1–4 feature variant photo covers by Jeff Zoet. Issue #1 – Abbey Chase portrayed by Shannon McKee. Issue #2 – Natalia Kassle portrayed by Brittany Rotto. Issue #3 – Sydney Savage portrayed by Erin Cumiskey. Abbey, Sydney and Sonya must prevent a mysterious briefcase from falling into the hands of a lethal female assassin.
Danger Girl: Mayday
Written by co-creator Andy Hartnell and illustrated by John Royle, with cover art by John Royle, the story focuses on the revival and return of Natalia Kassle, brought back from the dead, who explores her own background, past and nature after suffering from memory loss during her supposed demise. It was published by IDW Publishing in April 2014.
Danger Girl: Renegade
A four-issue miniseries written by Andy Hartnell and illustrated by Stephen Molnar, with cover art by co-creator J. Scott Campbell, the story is set a year after the events of Mayday, but also explores segments from Abbey's background in parts. It was published by IDW Publishing in September 2015.

== In other media ==
=== Video game ===
A video game of the same name was developed by n-Space and published by THQ. It was released for the Sony PlayStation in 2000. It is loosely based on the first series which consisted of seven comic issues, but there have been many significant changes from the original storyline, such as Abbey Chase being a veteran Danger Girl operative and Natalia Kassle working for The Hammer from the very beginning of the adventure, along with a new member of the team that was never present in the comic books was introduced, named "JC".

=== Film adaptation ===
In April 2010, Hitman: Agent 47 producer Adrian Askarieh was interested in developing a film based on the comic with Todd Lincoln as director.

In November 2017, Constantin Film acquired the rights to develop Danger Girl as both a film and potential TV series, in partnership with Askarieh's Prime Universe Films and Jeremy Bolt's Bolt Pictures.

In February 2018, Umair Aleem was hired as the film's writer, with creators J. Scott Campbell and Andy Hartnell serving as executive producers alongside Constantin Film's Martin Moszkowicz.

In March 2019, Jeff Wadlow was attached to write and direct the film.
