= Evernight (series) =

Series of romantic fantasy novels by Claudia Gray

- Evernight; Stargazer; Hourglass; Afterlife; Balthazar
- Author: Claudia Gray
- Country: United States
- Language: English
- Genre: Young adult, Fantasy, Gothic
- Publisher: HarperTeen
- Published: May 27, 2008 – March 1, 2012
- Media type: Print (Hardcover, Paperback)

Evernight is a series of five vampire-based romantic fantasy novels by The New York Times bestselling American author Claudia Gray. It tells the story of Bianca Olivier, a 16-year-old half-vampire girl born to two vampires, who is forced to attend Evernight Academy, a private boarding school for vampires (although some humans are enrolled). She was enrolled in order to fulfill her destiny to become a full vampire, even though she feels she doesn't belong there. Bianca then meets and falls in love with a human named Lucas Ross, who also feels he isn't the Evernight type, but their love becomes forbidden by their families and friends when the truth of each other's nature comes to light. Not only is it revealed that Bianca is a vampire, but it is also revealed that Lucas is a member of the ancient vampire hunting group Black Cross.

== Novels ==
- Evernight (May 2008)

Bianca Olivier, a daughter of two vampires, is forced to go to Evernight Academy, a school for vampires to learn how to live in the mortal world. While attending she falls in love with a human, Lucas Ross. But Lucas is hiding a dark secret that could separate them forever.

- Stargazer (March 2009)

Bianca and Lucas are separated, and Bianca would do anything to be with him, even if it means deceiving the powerful vampires of Evernight.

- Hourglass (March 2010)

Bianca has found refuge with Black Cross, a vampire hunting group, bent on destroying her kind. Within weeks, Bianca befriends many of the hunters, but she has no fun being in Black Cross and is reluctant to leave with Lucas. However, many old faces return and try to claim her as their own.

- Afterlife (March 2011)

Bianca and Lucas return to Evernight, as a wraith and vampire respectively. Lucas is facing demons, both personal and supernatural. Bianca must help him fight the demons inside him - and face her destiny at last.

- Balthazar (March 2012)

In a story filled with forbidden love and dark suspense, one of the most beloved characters in Claudia Gray’s New York Times bestselling Evernight series will captivate readers with his battle to overcome his past and follow his heart.

=== Evernight ===
Evernight
- Author: Claudia Gray
- Language: English
- Series: Evernight series
- Genre: Young adult, Fantasy, Gothic
- Publisher: HarperTeen
- Publication date: May 27, 2008
- Publication place: United States
- Media type: Print (Hardcover, Paperback)
- Pages: 336
- ISBN: 978-0-06-128444-1
- Followed by: Stargazer

Evernight is a 2008 fiction young adult novel by Claudia Gray. It is the first novel in the Evernight series. It is followed by Stargazer, released March 24, 2009; Hourglass, released March 15, 2010; and the final installment Afterlife, released March 3, 2011. Another book in the series, Balthazar, features one of the main characters, Balthazar. This series is recommended to people between the ages of 14 and 18.

School Library Journal wrote: “Gray’s writing hooks readers from the first page and reels them in with surprising plot twists and turns, and the open ending will keep them guessing and waiting on the edge of their seats for the next book in the series. A must-have for fans of vampire stories by Amelia Atwater-Rhodes, Stephenie Meyer, and the like.” regarding the initial installment of the series. Romantic times bookclub wrote that Evernight was a "Teenage love, ancient hatred and a Romeo and Juliet-style feud fuel the fires in this compelling first-person drama." Booklist wrote that Evernight was something that "Stephenie Meyer fans will find similar rewards in the flashes of humor; the terrifying battle between ancient, supernatural societies; and the steamy romance in which love bites aren’t just a euphemism." Kirkus Reviews was critical of the book commenting "The problem is Bianca’s first-person narration. Why does she hide her vampirism from the reader for half the book? The mysterious foreshadowing and hints about “Evernight type” students seem disingenuous at best once readers realize Bianca knew everything all along. Thin characterization, a need to state the obvious and constant iteration of Lucas's name quickly grow old." However, despite the criticism, the Kirkus had some positive feedback: "Some fun details (a modern technology class where vampires learn to use iPods), the inexorable clash between the vampires and their Black Cross hunters and the open question of what will happen next make this enjoyable enough, particularly for fans of that other vampire series who need something to read while they wait for Breaking Dawn"

Plot

Bianca Olivier is a new student to Evernight Academy, a Gothic boarding school with "perfect" but predatory students. She knows she does not belong but she cannot escape because her parents are now teachers at the school. Bianca believes the best of her parents and trusts them about everything even when her brain tells her not to. As school progresses, Bianca befriends Lucas, Raquel, a loner like her, and Vic, Lucas's roommate. She develops enemies, like Courtney and Erich, who are what Bianca calls "The Evernight Type". At a party, she befriends a handsome, popular, but friendly guy, Balthazar More. Balthazar asks her to the Autumn Ball. There, she, Lucas and Balthazar get into an argument, and Balthazar leaves them alone. Outside, under the gazebo, she and Lucas kiss for the first time. Bianca gives in to temptation, bites Lucas and drinks his blood. After she realizes what she did, she screams for help. Upon hearing, Courtney comes out and says "Well, it's about time you became a vampire like the rest of us." When Lucas awakens he is unable to remember the event. Lucas and Bianca declare their love for each other. Lucas eventually discovers Bianca is a vampire, but she is a child of two vampires and he accepts this. After they have been officially dating for weeks, Bianca mentions that one of Lucas's ancestors went to Evernight, but no humans have ever been accepted to the school before, except a Black Cross member (a group of elite vampire hunters). Her parents and Balthazar realize this and attack, but Lucas holds his own against two vampires and they chase him off campus. Bianca runs off with him, and even though he has been raised to hate all vampires, he still loves Bianca. They meet up with the rest of his team, and the Black Cross think that she is a stolen baby, hiding the truth she is a vampire. Bianca's parents turn up and take her back home because they do not understand. She reluctantly goes with them. A few days later she receives a letter through Vic from Lucas telling her that he will always love her and they will meet again.

=== Stargazer ===
Stargazer
- Author: Claudia Gray
- Language: English
- Series: Evernight series
- Genre: Young adult, Fantasy, Gothic
- Publisher: HarperTeen
- Publication date: March 24, 2009
- Publication place: United States
- Media type: Print (Hardcover, Paperback)
- Pages: 336
- ISBN: 0-00-735532-7
- Preceded by: Evernight
- Followed by: Hourglass

Stargazer is a fantasy novel by Claudia Gray released in 2009. It is the second part of the Evernight series, following Evernight. It is followed by the third book in the series, Hourglass.

Stargazer was listed as "The # 1 The New York Times Bestseller". Seventeen magazine praised Claudia Gray's Stargazer writing: “If you like Twilight, this book has even more drama.”. Kirkus Reviews wrote critically of the book saying "Bianca’s tendency to belabor every point, particularly the depth of her love for Lucas, makes for a dull narrative style, and three-dimensional characters are pretty much nonexistent. Despite the predictable romantic entanglements and the constant telling, the plot races along with a search for a crazed renegade vampire, threatening ghosts, uncovered secrets and a flaming climax with a significant body count. Fans of the first volume will be satisfied; insufficient back story means no one else will know (or care) what is going on."

Plot

The book returns to Bianca's story a few months later. Both she and Lucas will stop at nothing to see each other again—even if it means living a life of secrets and lies. But even as Bianca finds herself torn between two worlds, she soon discovers they aren't the only ones keeping secrets.

Evernight Academy is an exclusive boarding school for the most beautiful, dangerous students of all—vampires. Bianca, born to two vampires, has always been told her destiny is to become one of them. But Bianca fell in love with Lucas—a vampire hunter sworn to destroy her kind. They were torn apart when his true identity was revealed, forcing him to flee the school. Although they may be separated Bianca and Lucas will not give each other up. She will risk anything for the chance to see him again, even if it means coming face-to-face with the vampire hunters of Black Cross—or deceiving the powerful vampires of Evernight. Bianca's secrets will force her to live a life of lies. Yet Bianca is not the only one with secrets. When Evernight is attacked by an evil force that seems to target her, she discovers the truth she thought she knew is only the beginning. Bianca breaks into Mrs Bethany's carriage house in an attempt to discover what Lucas wanted to know; why humans are allowed at Evernight. She discovers nothing and heads back to Evernight, disappointed. She sees someone in the hall, but decides that it was just her own reflection. Orientation day sees Bianca sharing a room with Raquel, as Patrice has left Evernight for a few decades. Raquel's parents forced her to return to Evernight, despite her having told them that she was stalked by Erich. Bianca catches up with Vic, who gives her a letter from Lucas. Bianca's mail is being searched for this exact reason, so they cannot keep in contact. The letter tells Bianca to meet Lucas in October at the Amherst train station. As Bianca leaves her room to drink blood (she is the only vampire sharing with a human), she sees a blue light and thinks that there is a person on the stairs. This time, she is more curious, but is interrupted before she can investigate further. Bianca tells everyone there is a meteor shower so that she can camp out on the grounds to watch it. Really she is going to see Lucas. She hitches a ride in the laundry truck into Amherst and is walking along to find Lucas when a young vampire girl joins her in her walk. She is afraid of someone following her, and Bianca thinks she looks so lonely and innocent that she cannot refuse. The girl says she once went to Evernight, but did not get along with Mrs Bethany and ran away. They arrive at the train station and Lucas follows shortly after. He sees the girl with Bianca and thinks she is going to harm her. It turns out that Lucas had been the one following the vampire girl and she is very frightened. She attacks Lucas and wants to kill him, but Bianca stops her in time. Lucas calls for the rest of the Black Cross to come, so Bianca tells the girl to run away. She escapes before the Black Cross arrives, and Bianca and Lucas share the weekend at the Base Camp, as Black Cross does not know she is a vampire. When she sneaks back, Balthazar catches her. In an attempt to reason with Balthazar and make sure he does not tell Mrs. Bethany about her visit, she mentions the vampire girl who turns out to be Balthazar's sister. Soon Bianca and Balthazar make an arrangement; they pretend to be dating so Balthazar could get her off campus, since he is a trusted student, so she could meet Lucas while in return Bianca and Lucas help Balthazar find his sister, Charity, which they do. She is now part of a clan and blames Balthazar for killing her. After Courtney finds out about Bianca and Balthazar leaving school she stakes her and then decapitates her before leaving. An attack on the school by Charity and her clan while an attack by Black Cross is taking place leads Bianca, Lucas and Raquel to leave the school and head to Black Cross HQ. On their way out of the school they meets Charity who they think will kill them but as they prepare to run she is pushed against a tree and staked by a sharp branch. Although Lucas wants to finish her off he cannot find anything to destroy her with so agrees to leave her. When at Black Cross HQ Raquel volunteers to join and Bianca later agrees to join.

=== Hourglass ===
Hourglass
- Author: Claudia Gray
- Language: English
- Series: Evernight series
- Genre: Young adult, Fantasy, Gothic
- Publisher: HarperTeen
- Publication date: March 15, 2010
- Publication place: United States
- Media type: Print (Hardcover, Paperback)
- Pages: 368
- ISBN: 0-00-735533-5
- Preceded by: Stargazer
- Followed by: Afterlife

Hourglass is a fantasy novel by Claudia Gray released in 2010. It is the third novel of the Evernight series, a series of four books, and is preceded by Stargazer and followed by Afterlife. The four books feature vampires, wraiths (ghosts), betrayal, and, of course, love. The main character, Bianca Oliver, is living with her rocky, shaky, strong, sturdy and passionate relationship with the head man, Lucas Ross. But Lucas is also a member of the ancient vampire hunting group Black Cross.

ALA booklist commented that Hourglass was “A steamy romance in which love bites aren’t just a euphemism”, while School Library Journal wrote “Gray’s writing hooks readers from the first page and reels them in with surprising plot twists and turns.” Booklist reviewed the book, calling it a "heart-pounding page-turner".

Plot

Hourglass reaches Bianca after she has already been accepted into the Black Cross. Even though things may feel weird at that moment, the changes are about to come three-fold, and Bianca is almost powerless.

Bianca, Lucas and Raquel are now living in the New York Black Cross cell. Raquel and the rest of Lucas's Black Cross cell are currently unaware Bianca is a vampire. Mrs. Bethany later stages a break in to the Black Cross cell wanting to take Bianca back to her parents. Several members of Black Cross are killed including Lucas's stepfather Eduardo whose neck is broken by Mrs. Bethany. In the attack Balthazar is captured and tied up by Black Cross who begin to torture him to find out why Mrs. Bethany attacked Black Cross. Bianca and Lucas begin orchestrating Balthazar's escape and succeed without getting caught. After the break in by Mrs. Bethany, Bianca needs to feed so they go to a hospital to get blood for Bianca from the blood bank. They are interrupted by Raquel and Dana who realise that Bianca is a vampire as she is feeding. They both promise not to tell anyone but Bianca is woken in the night after someone told the Black Cross cell about Bianca's vampirism. She is tied up and burnt with holy water, and Lucas. who is also splashed, burns due to him feeding Bianca. Dana helps them escape and gives them some money but tells Black Cross they escaped. After Lucas realises there is a dangerous vampire in the city they are staying in, he decides to hunt it. Lucas finds the rogue vampire but after following him to a hotel room realises that Charity, Balthazar's sister, is staying close by with her clan who the rogue vampire belongs to. He escapes and later he and Bianca tell Balthazar that Charity is near by. Bianca and Lucas begin to run out of money and go to their friend Vic for help. He allows them to stay in the basement. On Bianca's birthday Lucas takes her to the planetarium where they are attacked by wraiths. They both escape and later get jobs. While staying in Vic's house Bianca becomes increasingly weak and ill. Bianca realises that she must kill a human and become a full vampire otherwise she will die. Lucas offers to allow Bianca to kill him but she refuses as he would not agree to rise with her. She later dies and becomes a wraith. She is met by a wraith named Maxine who tells her that she is powerful due to her born status as a wraith. She is told she can form a body by holding objects she has bonded to in her life including her broche and her coral bracelet which were both made of once living material. Bianca appears to Lucas telling him about her becoming a wraith. Lucas with Ranulf and Vic who have returned from holiday agree to assist Balthazar in killing Charity. Vic waits outside after they track her down to a rundown cinema where they fight and kill several members of her clan. While Bianca is solid she is injured by Charity who throws a shard of iron at her which is weakening to wraiths, causing her to loses her solidity. Charity, Bianca and Lucas are alone and as Bianca is powerless she pins down Lucas before draining his blood killing him. Charity leaves and Balthazar and Ranulf arrive who tell Bianca of Lucas's fate. He will become a vampire.

=== Afterlife ===
Afterlife
- Author: Claudia Gray
- Language: English
- Series: Evernight series
- Genre: Young adult, Fantasy, Gothic
- Publisher: HarperTeen
- Publication date: March 3, 2011
- Publication place: United States
- Media type: Print (Hardcover, Paperback)
- Pages: 364
- ISBN: 0-06-128442-4
- Preceded by: Hourglass

Afterlife is a fantasy novel by Claudia Gray released on March 3, 2011. It is the fourth part of the Evernight series, concluding the ongoing plot from the previous novel Hourglass, which began in the first novel Evernight and ran into the second, Stargazer. This book is followed by a new story in the series, "Balthazar".

Although Claudia Gray has confirmed that she does not plan to write anymore Evernight books she is to write a spin off book about Balthazar More focusing on his life, death and later adventures. This will be released in March 2012.

Plot

Bianca, now a wraith, and Lucas, now a vampire, must return to Evernight to help control his blood lust. Bianca needs to find out what Mrs. Bethany wants with the wraiths before it is too late. Can their love survive their deaths or will they end up destroying one another? Lucas rises from the dead and assisted by Balthazar and Ranulf. Bianca manages to convince Lucas to return to Evernight to seek help for his bloodlust before it is too late and he is consumed by it. After his return, Mrs. Bethany offers him shelter, much to the annoyance of his fellow pupils. Bianca's parents are told that their daughter has died, for which they blame Lucas. While in the library Bianca is caught in a trap set by Mrs Bethany to trap wraiths. She is freed by intruding into Lucas's dreams. Lucas is set to go on a trip to the local town and Bianca goes to accompany him. Bianca, while following Lucas until she can appear to him, is trapped by Patrice using a mirror. He frees her but finds out everything about how she died and how Lucas became a vampire. At the Cafe, Lucas is attacked by several Black Cross members, including his mother, who leave after the police are called and although no one is harmed, Lucas is shaken up. Bianca and her father are reunited and he accepts her for what she is before helping Bianca tell her mother. Her parents also realize Mrs. Bethany is up to something, and so agree to help Bianca and her friends search the school for the traps set by Mrs. Bethany and to free the wraiths on the night of the autumn ball. While the ball is taking place, several human students are possessed by wraiths who are angry and confused as to what is happening at Evernight. Bianca goes to visit Christopher, a powerful wraith, and he tells her that she could be used as a bridge between the human world and the world that wraiths inhibit before they can reach heaven. She agrees to think about it before returning to the human world. She later witnesses Lucas being told by Mrs. Bethany about how vampires can be resurrected to human form although it involves the sacrifice of a wraith when the mixture of both supernaturals' blood happens. Lucas disagrees and leaves. Bianca is caught in a powerful trap when she goes to get her coral bracelet so that she can apparate fully and feels like she has been trapped for days, before being released into a large room which was designed to contain and weaken wraiths. Mrs. Bethany reveals that she plans on killing Bianca so she could become human again but her plans are stopped when Lucas and her parents arrive. Bianca cannot escape from the room so she possesses Skye who allows her to. Bianca helps the other wraiths to leave the human world by creating a light to which the wraiths float towards, while taking on a more human look, no longer the mutilated beings they previously were. She was willing to leave but Mrs. Bethany traps Maxine who had warned her parents. Bianca calls upon Christopher, revealed to be Mrs. Bethany's husband before he was murdered, who switches place with Maxine and is destroyed as Mrs. Bethany's cottage collapses, killing her too. A battle ensues with the vampires who planned to help murder Bianca and her fellow wraiths and friends. Lucas is gravely wounded but Bianca drinks his blood and he drinks hers. Their blood infuses and Lucas is resurrected to human life. The series finishes after Bianca reflects on the rest of her eternal life as a bridge between worlds for the wraiths.

== Characters ==
The Evernight follows protagonist Bianca Olivier a half-vampire, and her boyfriend Lucas Ross, who is a member of Black Cross. Throughout the series they are joined by Balthazar More a 400-year-old vampire; Vic a student at Evernight and Lucas's roommate; Raquel Vargas, Bianca's friend and roommate; and Ranulf White a vampire and friend of Balthazar and Vic. Mrs. Bethanty joins them as the main antagonist and headmistress of Evernight, along with Charity More. Other characters to appear in all four books include Kate Ross Lucas's mother and a member of Black Cross; Dana who is Lucas's best friend and a member of Black Cross who later leaves; and Celia and Adrian Olivier, Bianca's parents who had her with the help of the wraiths and gave her a sheltered life. Other students at Evernight include Patrice Deveraux who Bianca believes is a typical Evernight student (but she is proven wrong); Courtney who is typical Evernight and enjoys bullying the human students; and Erich, a bully who later obsesses over Raquel and begins stalking her. Other members of Black Cross include Mr Wantanabe, one of the oldest members who is killed in the battle with Charity; and Eduardo, who is Kate's husband and Lucas's stepfather, as well as being the leader of Lucas's cell.

=== Main characters ===
==== Bianca Olivier ====
Bianca Olivier is the narrator in the series, which is written in from a first-person perspective. It is revealed that she was born to vampires because of help from wraiths so is half vampire and half wraith. Bianca is somewhat naive at first, particularly about the dangers of vampires, and she is very shy and describes herself as geeky; she cares a lot for her schooling, as well, even if she's in a school she doesn't like. She listens to her parents and hates deceiving them, but she soon faces the fact that she must and that they weren't always honest with her. Although throughout the first book, she describes her looks as average, nothing spectacular but not ugly, she is told several times that she is beautiful, most notably by Patrice, who "wouldn't have said it unless she meant it." Not only does she not feel that she belongs at Evernight with the vampires, she doesn't want to. She almost loses herself in the crowd when she is waltzing with Balthazar, but is brought back to her senses by simply remembering Lucas. Throughout the series, however, she becomes bolder, more powerful and more independent. She is nicknamed "Binks" by Vic, who remains the only one to call her that.

===== Evernight =====
In Evernight she is revealed to be a half vampire. She falls in love with Lucas although it is revealed he is a member of the ancient vampire hunting group Black Cross. He is forced away from Evernight and later Bianca runs off with him, he tells Bianca that he still loves her even though she is a vampire.

They meet up with the rest of Black Cross but later Bianca's parents turn up

===== Stargazer =====
In Stargazer she is stalked by wraiths and is nearly killed several times. She receives a letter from Lucas asking her to meet him at Amherst train station. She sneaks off campus telling everyone that there is a meteor shower so she can camp on campus. Bianca meets Charity who is Balthazar's sister. Lucas attacks Charity who runs away when the rest of Black Cross arrive which forces Bianca to spend the rest of the weekend at Black Cross HQ.

Bianca is caught by Balthazar while sneaking back who agrees not to tell Mrs. Bethany as long as she helps him find Charity. Evernight is later attacked by Charity while an attack by Black Cross is being carried out. Bianca, Raquel and Lucas leave Evernight to go to Black Cross HQ but are attacked by Charity. Charity is pushed against a tree and staked on a sharp branch. They leave and Bianca reluctantly agrees to join Black Cross.

===== Hourglass =====
In Hourglass Black Cross is attacked by Mrs. Bethany and several members of Evernight including Balthazar who is captured. Bianca and Lucas help Balthazar escape without being caught. When Bianca is feeding, Raquel and Dana walk in and although they agree not to say anything, Bianca is woken in the night by Black Cross who tie her up and begin to torture her. Lucas is also splashed with Holy water and burns because he has fed Bianca. Lucas and Bianca escape with the help of Dana.

When Lucas is following a rogue vampire to a hotel room he realizes that Charity, Balthazar's sister, is staying close by with her clan, who the rogue vampire belongs to. He escapes and later he and Bianca tell Balthazar that Charity is near by. Bianca and Lucas begin to run out of money, so they go to Vic for help. He allows them to stay in the basement. On Bianca's birthday Lucas takes her to the planetarium where they are attacked by wraiths. While staying in Vic's house Bianca becomes increasingly weak and ill. Bianca realizes that she must kill a human and become a full vampire otherwise she will die. Although she could have killed Lucas, who offered himself to her as long as she did not let him rise, she dies and becomes a wraith.

She is met by a wraith named Maxine who tells her that she is powerful due to her born status as a wraith. She is told that she can form a body by holding objects that she has bonded to in her life including her brooch and her coral bracelet which were both made of once living material. Lucas, with Ranulf and Vic who have returned from a holiday, agree to assist Balthazar in killing charity. They track her down to a rundown cinema. While Bianca is solid, she is injured by Charity who throws a shard of iron at her which is weakening to wraiths, causing her to loses her solidity. Charity, Bianca and Lucas are alone and as Bianca is powerless she pins down Lucas before draining his blood and killing him. Charity leaves and Balthazar and Ranulf arrive who tell Bianca of Lucas's fate, he will have to become a vampire.

===== Afterlife =====
When Lucas rises from the dead, Bianca manages to convince Lucas to return to Evernight to seek help for his bloodlust. Bianca's parents are told that their daughter has died, to which they blame Lucas. While in the library, Bianca is stuck in a trap set by Mrs Bethany specifically to catch wraiths. She is freed by intruding into Lucas's dreams. Bianca while following Lucas until she can appear to him is trapped by Patrice using a mirror who frees her but finds out everything about how she died and how Lucas became a vampire.

Bianca and her father are reunited and he accepts her for what she is before helping Bianca tell her mother. Her parents also realize Mrs. Bethany is up to something so agree to help Bianca and her friends to search the school for the traps set by Mrs. Bethany and to free the wraiths on the night of the autumn ball.

Bianca goes to visit Christopher, a powerful wraith, and he tells her that she could be used as a bridge between the human world and world that wraiths inhibit before they can reach heaven. She agrees to think about it before returning to the human world. She later witnesses Lucas being told by Mrs. Bethany about how vampires can be resurrected to human form although it involves the sacrifice of a wraith when the mixture of both supernaturals blood happens. Lucas disagrees and leaves.

Bianca is trapped in a powerful trap and feels like she has been trapped for days before being released into a large room which was designed to trap and weaken wraiths. Mrs. Bethany reveals that she plans on killing Bianca to become human again but her plans are stopped when Lucas and her parents arrive. Bianca cannot escape from the room so possesses Skye who allows her to. Bianca helps the other wraiths to leave the human world. Mrs. Bethany traps Maxine who had warned her parents so Bianca knows she must help her. Bianca calls upon Christopher who is revealed to be Mrs. Bethany's husband before he was murdered, who switches place with Maxine and is destroyed as Mrs. Bethany's cottage collapses killing her too. A battle ensues with the vampires who planned to help murder Bianca and her fellow wraiths. Lucas is gravely wounded but Bianca drinks his blood and he drinks hers. Their blood infuses and Lucas is resurrected to human life. The series finishes after Bianca reflects on the rest of her eternal life as a bridge between worlds for the wraiths.

===== Balthazar =====
In Balthazar, Bianca appears as a minor character. Once when Balthazar and Skye are discovering Skye's true nature, Bianca turns up as a wraith to give them some advice.

==== Lucas Ross ====
Lucas Ross is the love interest of Bianca. Lucas is described by Balthazar as smart and will stand up for the people who can't stand up for themselves. He has a hot temper, explaining that he'd always settled things with his fists, but when he's hanging out with his friends, such as Bianca or Vic, he seems completely at ease with the world and enjoys every second of his life. He is very good to the people he loves but he's not good at expressing how he feels. He can be stubborn, but not as much when he's with Bianca because he'd do nearly anything for her, including offer her his blood when she's been without food for long enough to feel weak. He has a talent for twisting the facts, laying them out so that he's not inventing a lie but merely letting people believe things happened differently than they really had. He's very kind to most humans and has a good sense of humor, even when it comes to things as revolting as Bianca's bloodlust. Lucas said that if he left Black Cross and went to University, he'd study law because he wants "to put the bad guys away." Lucas is part of the infamous Black Cross vampire slayer group and was inducted by his mother, who has a strong disdain for vampires.

===== Evernight =====
Lucas Ross is a new student at Evernight Academy, and he soon befriends Bianca and Vic who is his roommate. At the Autumn Ball after Balthazar asks Bianca to go with him, he and Balthazar get into an argument, and Balthazar leaves them alone. Outside, under the gazebo, she and Lucas kiss for the first time. Bianca gives in to temptation, bites Lucas and drinks his blood. After she realizes what she did, she screams for help.

When Lucas awakens he is unable to remember the event. Lucas and Bianca declare their love for each other. Lucas eventually discovers Bianca is a vampire, but she is a child of two vampires and he accepts this.

After they have been dating for weeks, Bianca mentions that one of Lucas' ancestors went to Evernight, but no humans have ever been accepted to the school before, except a Black Cross member. Her parents and Balthazar realize this and attack, but Lucas holds his own against two vampires and they chase him off campus. Bianca runs off with him, and even though he has been raised to hate all vampires, he still loves Bianca. They meet up with the rest of his team, and Black Cross accept her, believing that she was stolen as a baby.

Bianca's parents turn up and take her back home because they do not understand. She reluctantly goes with them. A few days later she receives a letter through Vic from Lucas telling her that he will always love her and they will meet again.

===== Stargazer =====
Bianca receives a letter from Lucas by Vic, as Bianca's mail is being searched for this exact reason, so they cannot keep in regular contact. The letter tells Bianca to meet Lucas in October at the Amherst train station.

Bianca tells everyone there is a meteor shower so that she can camp out on the grounds to watch it. Really she is going to see Lucas. She hitches a ride in the laundry truck into Amherst and is walking along to find Lucas when a young vampire girl joins her in her walk. She is afraid of someone following her, and Bianca thinks she looks so lonely and innocent that she cannot refuse. They arrive at the train station and Lucas follows shortly after. He sees the girl with Bianca and thinks she is going to harm her. It turns out that Lucas had been the one following the vampire girl and she is very frightened. She attacks Lucas and wants to kill him, but Bianca stops her in time. Lucas calls for the rest of the Black Cross to come, so Bianca tells the girl to run away. She escapes before the Black Cross arrives, and Bianca and Lucas share the weekend at the Base Camp, as Black Cross does not know she is a vampire. Bianca and Balthazar make an arrangement; they pretend to be dating so Balthazar could get her off campus, since he is a trusted student, so she could meet Lucas while in return Bianca and Lucas help Balthazar find his sister, Charity which they do.

An attack on the school by Charity and her clan while an attack by Black Cross is taking place leads Bianca, Lucas and Raquel to leave the school and head to Black Cross HQ. On their way out of the school they meets Charity who they think will kill them but as they prepare to run she is pushed against a tree and staked by a sharp branch. Although Lucas wants to finish her off he cannot find anything to destroy her with so agrees to leave her. When at Black Cross HQ Raquel volunteers to join and Bianca later agrees to join.

===== Hourglass =====
Bianca, Lucas and Raquel are now living in the New York Black Cross cell. Mrs. Bethany later stages a break into the Black Cross cell to retrieve Bianca. Several members of Black Cross are killed including Lucas's step father Eduardo whose neck is broken by Mrs. Bethany. In the attack Balthazar is captured and tied up by Black Cross who begin to torture him to find out why Mrs. Bethany attacked Black Cross. Bianca and Lucas begin orchestrating Balthazar's escape which they do so without getting caught.

After the break in by Mrs. Bethany, Bianca needs to feed so they go to a hospital to get blood for Bianca from the blood bank. They are interrupted by Raquel and Dana who realize that Bianca is a vampire as she is feeding. They both promise not to tell anyone but Bianca is woken in the night after someone told the Black Cross cell about Bianca's vampirism. She is tied up and burnt with holy water but Lucas is also splashed who burns due to him feeding Bianca. Dana helps them escape and gives them some money but tells Black Cross they escaped.

After Lucas realizes there is a dangerous vampire in the city they are staying in, he decides to hunt it. Lucas finds the rogue vampire but after following him to a hotel room realizes that Charity, Balthazar's sister, is staying close by with her clan who the rogue vampire belongs to. He escapes and later he and Bianca tell Balthazar that Charity is near by.

Bianca and Lucas begin to run out of money and go to their friend Vic for help who allows them to stay in the basement. On Bianca's birthday Lucas takes her to the planetarium where they are attacked by wraiths. They both escape and later get jobs. While staying in Vic's house Bianca becomes increasingly weak and ill. Bianca realizes that she must kill a human and become a full vampire otherwise she will die. Lucas offers to allow Bianca to kill him but she refuses as he would not agree to rise with her.

Bianca appears to Lucas telling him about her becoming a wraith. Lucas, Ranulf and Vic who have returned from holiday agree to assist Balthazar in killing Charity. They track her down to a rundown cinema where they fight and kill several members of her clan. While Bianca is solid she is injured by Charity, causing her to loses her solidity. Charity, Bianca and Lucas are alone and as Bianca is powerless she pins down Lucas before draining his blood killing him. Charity leaves and Balthazar and Ranulf arrive who tell Bianca of Lucas's fate, he will become the one thing he despises, a vampire.

===== Afterlife =====
The novel begins when Lucas rises from the dead and assisted by Balthazar and Ranulf, Bianca manages to convince Lucas to return to Evernight to seek help for his bloodlust before it is too late and he is consumed by it. After his return Mrs. Bethany offers him shelter much to the annoyance of his fellow pupils. While in the library Bianca is trapped in a trap set by Mrs Bethany to trap wraiths. She is freed by intruding into Lucas's dreams. Lucas is set to go onto a trip to the local town to which Bianca is going to accompany him. At the cafe Lucas is attacked by several Black Cross members, including his mother, who leave after the police are called, and although no one is harmed Lucas is shaken up. Bianca and her friends agree to search the school for the traps set by Mrs. Bethany and to free the wraiths on the night of the Autumn Ball. While the ball is taking place several human students are possessed by wraiths who are angry and confused as to what is happening at Evernight.

Lucas is told by Mrs. Bethany about how vampires can be resurrected to human form although it involves the sacrifice of a wraith when the mixture of both supernaturals blood happens. Lucas disagrees and leaves as he does not agree with the Morality of it.

Bianca is trapped in a powerful trap before being released into a large room which was designed to trap and weaken wraiths. Mrs. Bethany reveals that she plans on killing Bianca to become human again but her plans are stopped when Lucas and her parents arrive. Bianca cannot escape from the room so possesses Skye who allows her to.

A battle ensues with the vampires who planned to help murder Bianca and her fellow wraiths and friends. Lucas is gravely wounded but Bianca drinks his blood and he drinks hers. Their blood infuses and Lucas is resurrected to human life and back to happiness.

==== Balthazar More ====
Balthazar More is the friend of Bianca and at one point in the series her love interest. He is a vampire and has been one for over four hundred years. He is described as handsome and extremely popular amongst his peers. He always says hello to people in the hallway, whether human or vampire, deciding that it didn't make a difference. Balthazar has only taken a human life once (that is mentioned, at least) and he had never stopped tourturing himself for it. Bianca's parents adore Balthazar and Bianca had come to realize he was one of her closest friends, but felt that he deserved more than what she was giving him, wishing that he could find happiness with someone else. Bianca can talk to Balthazar about nearly anything. Bianca states that he was the only vampire who'd never lied to her, but added that he'd done most of the lying to himself. Lucas is jealous of Balthazar during Stargazer, when Balthazar and Bianca are at Evernight (and have to pretend to date in order to get off campus) and Lucas rarely gets to see her, saying that he's upset another guy gets to spend more time with her. He is the brother of Charity and her maker which is the biggest regret in his life. -Balthazar is nicknamed Balty by Vic, who is the only one to call him that.

===== Evernight =====
When attending the same party he befriends Bianca who he asks to the Autumn Ball. There, he, Lucas and Bianca get into an argument, and while Balthazar leaves them alone Bianca gives in to temptation and bites Lucas, drinking his blood.

Bianca mentions that one of Lucas' ancestors went to Evernight, although no humans have ever been previously accepted to the school, except a Black Cross member. Her parents and Balthazar realize this and attack, but Lucas holds his own against the two vampires and they chase him off campus.

Bianca's parents turn up and take her back home along with Balthazar who do not understand.

===== Stargazer =====
Bianca goes into Amherst and is walking along to find Lucas when a young vampire girl joins her in her walk. When she sneaks back, Balthazar catches her. In an attempt to reason with Balthazar and make sure he does not tell Mrs. Bethany about her visit, she mentions the vampire girl who turns out to be Balthazar's sister. Soon Bianca and Balthazar make an arrangement; they pretend to be dating so Balthazar could get her off campus, since he is a trusted student, so she could meet Lucas while in return Bianca and Lucas help Balthazar find his sister, Charity which they do. She is now part of a clan and blames Balthazar for killing her.

===== Hourglass =====
Mrs. Bethany stages a break into the Black Cross cell along with several members of staff and Balthazar, wanting to take Bianca back to her parents. In the attack Balthazar is captured and tied up by Black Cross who begin to torture him to find out why Mrs. Bethany attacked Black Cross. Bianca and Lucas begin orchestrating Balthazar's escape which they do so without getting caught.

Lucas finds a rogue vampire in the city they are staying in, but after following him to a hotel room he realizes that Charity, Balthazar's sister, is staying close by with her clan who the rogue vampire belongs to. He escapes and later he and Bianca tell Balthazar that Charity is near by.

Balthazar asks Lucas, Ranulf and Vic to assist him in killing charity. Charity pins down Lucas before draining his blood killing him. Charity leaves and Balthazar and Ranulf arrive who tell Bianca of Lucas's fate, he will become a vampire.

===== Afterlife =====
Balthazar and Ranulf assist Lucas as he rises from the dead. Balthazar insists that Lucas return to Evernight to help him conquer his bloodlust.

Balthazar assists Lucas several times throughout the year including stopping Charity invading Lucas's dreams by entering Charity's dreams and making her swear to stop. While in Charity's dreams he and Bianca see a house with smoke emitting from the chimney. He tells Bianca that it is the house of a girl he loved but thinks it best he did not visit her through dreams. Balthazar also helps Bianca agreeing to help her set free the trapped wraiths and put a stop to Mrs. Bethany's plans once and for all.

A battle ensues with the vampires who planned to help murder Bianca and her fellow wraiths and friends. Lucas is gravely wounded but Bianca drinks his blood and he drinks hers. There blood infuses and Lucas is resurrected to human life. Bianca offers the same cure for vampirism to Balthazar although he refuses after reflection on the possibility of becoming human once again.

===== Future =====
He is soon to star in his own spinoff novel entitled Balthazar about his life, death and adventures following. It will be released in March 2012.

==== Mrs. Bethany ====
Charlotte Bethany is a very old vampire who is afraid of change. She is the headmistress of Evernight Academy which is her home and life which she has continued running for many years. She worked at Black Cross and became a vampire after her husband was murdered. She did it so that she could have the power to seek revenge as her colleagues refused to help her find the men who murdered her husband and took his money. In Afterlife, she helps Lucas with his transformation and shows more kindness toward him than she'd ever had to anyone at the school, including Balthazar, due to the fact that she could strongly relate to what he was going through. She was later reunited with her husband who had become a wraith and to his surprise accepted him for who he was just as the roof of her cottage collapsed killing them both.

==== Vic Woodson ====
Vic Woodson is the friend of Bianca and Lucas and Lucas's roommate in Evernight. He is a human student at Evernight Academy and is allowed entry because his house is haunted by a wraith called Maxine. Vic isn't viewed as particularly bright, but as the series progresses, it's clear that he knew much more than he let on. He's described by Lucas as "oblivious and goofy" (which Lucas stated lovingly) in the beginning of the series, before they knew each other well. Vic is generally liked by everyone at Evernight as he believes that everyone is great in their own way. Vic gives nearly everyone he knows an unusual nickname and speaks in a very laidback style (ex: "...but this is beyond moody. This is Supermoody. Megamoody. X-treme moodiness." and "I intend to where it around case del Lucas y Victor.") but as the series progresses, he uses more complicated words, astonishing nearly all his friends at least once. He later figures out that many of the students at Evernight are vampires and even though he is wary he reasons if they wanted to harm him they could have done so already (this is not revealed until Hourglass, although it seems he'd known nearly the entire series). He strikes up a friendship with Ranulf White and later becomes his roommate as well as allowing him to stay with him over the school holidays. It's clear how wealthy Vic is during Hourglass, but he tries—and succeeds—not to act stuck up or snobby. His surname is never revealed in the books (until Hourglass/Afterlife) although it is confirmed on Gray's official site.

==== Raquel Vargas ====
Raquel Vargas is the friend and roommate of Bianca and girlfriend of Dana. She is stalked by Erich in her first year until he is killed by Lucas. She was haunted by a wraith who lived in her house so she left to live in Evernight. She was also raped by the wraith and haunted in her dreams by him. She went to work for Black Cross after discovering vampires existence when Evernight was attacked by Charity as well as Black Cross. She reported Bianca to Kate Ross when she realized that Bianca was a half vampire but was later forgiven by her and left Black Cross with Dana. She agreed to help Bianca and Lucas leave Evernight after they destroyed the traps set by Mrs. Bethany for the wraiths.

==== Ranulf White ====
Ranulf White is a student at Evernight Academy. He is Vic and Balthazar's friend and later Vic's roommate. He enjoys playing chess with Vic. Ranulf does not understand modern technology and speaks in a very old fashioned manner. He joins Balthazar in trying to kill Charity after he returns from holiday with Vic. When Lucas rises for the first time, Ranulf helps him by getting him blood and through his initial bloodlust. Ranulf agrees to help Bianca to find the traps set for wraiths by Mrs. Bethany.

==== Charity More ====
Charity More is Balthazar's sister who has now become a brutal killer and part of a tribe after she was turned by Balthazar. She wants to cause pain to others and later causes a fight between Black Cross and Evernight's vampires. She kills Lucas and turns him into a vampire in Hourglass and in Afterlife continues to haunt him through his dreams which can be done by a creator although it takes a lot of energy and the vampire has to sleep for many hours to do so. Balthazar later stops her doing so by going into her dreams.

==== Kate Ross ====
Kate Ross is Lucas's mother and one of the leaders of Black Cross. She does not accept him when he becomes a vampire and also tries to kill Bianca when she finds out she is half vampire. She does not treat vampires as people and calls Lucas a monster who is no longer her son but her son should be at peace. Kate is very strict when it comes to the belief of vampirism.

=== Minor characters ===
==== Patrice Deveraux ====
Patrice Deveraux is Bianca's roommate who appears to be one of the typical Evernight types, although Bianca realizes she is not. She appears to be very materialistic. She helps Bianca get ready for dates with Lucas. She does not appear in Stargazer as she is skiing with her new boyfriend, although she reappears in Afterlife and captures Bianca (who is now a wraith) using a mirror. She later helps Bianca by finding and destroying the traps set by Mrs. Bethany.

==== Maxine O'Connor ====
Maxine is the wraith who lives in Vic's attic. She is several years younger than Bianca and died ninety years before Bianca. She can be sarcastic and envious of Bianca for her powers, but she proves to be a friend of Bianca's, helping her tap her full potential as a wraith. She wears a night gown and often appears to Bianca asking her to come to see Christopher. Before Bianca becomes a wraith, Maxie haunts her at Evernight, insisting that she isn't "like them" (the vampires) but is "like [her]" (a wraith). She is the first wraith Bianca meets after she dies and she is later almost killed when she is captured by Mrs. Bethany but is freed by Christopher who sacrifices himself for her. Although this is never said, Maxie appears to have feelings for Vic, who has always been kind and accepting of her, although she's scared of appearing to him or even telling him his name. -Maxine O'Connor is one of the names Bianca finds in the records room when she is searching for the reason Mrs. Bethamy allowed humans at Evernight Academy, although it's never truly revealed why.

==== Dana ====
Dana is a member of Black Cross and a friend to Lucas. She seems too nice to be Black Cross to Bianca and was Lucas's best friend through his childhood. She is one of the few people who accepts Lucas when he becomes a vampire. Dana is in a relationship with Raquel.

==== Courtney ====
Courtney is a student at Evernight and is another one of the Evernight type according to Bianca. She is a bully towards the human students and enjoys taunting Raquel about money. Later Bianca realizes she is a bully because she envies the human students. When Courtney finds out about Bianca and Balthazar leaving school she is staked by Charity who then decapitates her before leaving.

==== Celia Olivier ====
Celia Olivier is Bianca's mother and Adrian's wife. She tells her daughter that she's her miracle baby and gives her a very sheltered life not telling her how she was truly born. Bianca worries that now she has become a wraith her mother will not accept her. She finally does and helps Bianca help the wraiths and stop Mrs. Bethany capturing them.

==== Adrian Olivier ====
Adrian Olivier is Bianca's Father and Celia's husband. He is very protective of Bianca and fights with Lucas when he realizes he is part of Black Cross even trying to kill him. He realizes Bianca is a wraith when he is trying to capture a wraith that almost kills him, Bianca comes to help him and goes to Vic and Patrice for help. He later tells Celia that Bianca is now a wraith and helps Bianca stop Mrs. Bethany capturing wraiths.

==== Mr. Wantanabe ====
Mr Wantanabe is part of Black Cross and one of the oldest members. He is killed in the battle with Charity.

==== Eduardo ====
Eduardo is Lucas's step-father and a leader of Black Cross. He is not accepted by Lucas. He is killed by Mrs. Bethany who snaps his neck.

==== Erich ====
Erich is a student at Evernight Academy and is the typical Evernight type according to Bianca. He stalks Raquel by stealing her possessions and scratching on her roof at the night to scare her. He eventually dies after fighting with Lucas who he at first thinks is not a threat until Lucas kills him.

==== Mr Yee ====
Mr Yee is the technology teacher at Evernight Academy. He teaches vampires about modern life devices and he also teaches Bianca and other students drivers' education

==== Skye Tierney ====
Skye is a human student in Evernight Academy. She first appears in the book Afterlife. She went to the Autumn Ball with Lucas and was later possessed by Bianca to save the rest of the students. Skye is the main character in the book Balthazar. She and Balthazar fall in love with each other. Skye's blood has the power to make vampires see their past back when they are still alive. The special qualities of her blood cause many evil vampires to come after her and endanger her life. At one point, Skye wants Balthazar to change her into a vampire, however he refuses. Balthazar describe Skye as a girl that makes his mind alive again. At the end, she and Balthazar can make it and are safe.

==== Lorenzo ====
Lorenzo is one of the main character in the book Balthazar. He once was a friend of Balthazar many years ago but they later broke up. Lorenzo is a cruel and brutal but powerful vampire.

==== John Redgrave ====
Redgrave is also a very bad vampire who appears in the last book in the series, Balthazar. He is the "captain " of Lorenzo's gang. He tries to endanger Skye's life by stalking her. At the end of the story, Redgrave is killed by Charity.

==== Constantia ====
Constantia is a female vampire who is also in Lorezo's gang. She is beautiful but full of cruelty. She once was in love with Balthazar but he rejected her. She is the one who made Charity rebels her brother, Balthazar years ago.

==== Jane ====
Balthazar's ex-girlfriend. Jane and Charity were both captured by Lorenzo, Redgrave and Constantia. Balthazar was made to turn one of them into a vampire. At last, Balthazar chose to bite Charity but unfortunately, Jane was also killed after Balthazar made the decision.

==== Craig ====
Skye's ex-boyfriend. He dumped Skye because of a Chinese girl called Britnee Fong. He and Britnee both discovered the existence of vampires and witnessed that when Charity makes the kill

== Future ==
Although Claudia Gray has confirmed that she does not plan to write any more Evernight books, she wrote a spin-off novel about Balthazar More focusing on his life, death and later adventures. The novel was released in March 2012.

== Reception ==
Reception for the series have been mostly positive. Regarding the initial installment of the series. L.J. Smith, author of The Vampire Diaries series, wrote "Once I picked Evernight up, I couldn’t put it down! I can’t wait for Claudia Gray’s next book!"
