= Star Wars: Into the Dark =

2021 young adult novel

Star Wars: The High Republic: Into the Dark
- Author: Claudia Gray
- Audio read by: Dan Bittner
- Cover artist: Giorgio Baroni
- Language: English
- Genre: Science fiction
- Publisher: Disney Lucasfilm Press
- Publication date: February 2, 2021
- Publication place: United States
- Media type: Print (hardcover, e-book, audiobook
- Pages: 448
- ISBN: 978-1368057288

Star Wars: The High Republic: Into the Dark is a 2021 young adult Star Wars novel written by Claudia Gray as part of the Star Wars: The High Republic franchise taking place 200 years before the events of Star Wars: The Phantom Menace. The novel follows Jedi Padawans exploring an abandoned space station during the events of a galaxy-wide disaster. It was published on February 2, 2021 by Disney Lucasfilm Press.

== Plot ==
The story is interrupted by another taking place twenty-five years in the past, told over six "parts" and furthering Orla and Cohmac's character motivations.

=== Main story ===
As his master Jora Malli is sent to oversee the Starlight Beacon in the far frontier of the galaxy, Reath Silas is sent along with Jedi Masters Cohmac Vitus, Orla Jareni, and Jedi Knight Dez Rydan to help pave the way for the project's opening ceremony. Reath, bookish and unwilling to engage in the action that many Jedi desire, wishes to stay at Coruscant. They are transported by the Byne Guild vessel Vessel, captained by Leox Gyasi, his co-pilot Affie Hollow, and Geode, who looks like a slab of rock. On the way there, their journey is interrupted by the Great Hyperspace Disaster, which forces them to take refuge in an abandoned Amaxine space station with other refugees. They discover that it has been kept operational by gardening droids, and that it is ripe with treasure, weapons, and other miscellaneous baubles. Reath stops gangs from looting the place and saves the life of a girl, Nan, who he bonds with. Orla discovers ancient idols and is struck by visions of the dark side. Affie finds out that the Byne Guild, led by her foster mother Scover, had some sort of involvement in the complex. While exploring the lower levels, Dez is seemingly decimated when he enters a control room consisting of helical parts. Reath and Nan discover escape pods throughout the first floor, and worries that Dez may have been ejected into space. The Jedi seal the idols in order to contain the mysterious dark entity. They return to Coruscant on the Vessel and contain the idols in a Sith shrine underneath the Jedi Temple.

Affie inquires after the Byne Guild's involvement in Amaxine, and discovers that their employees are actually indentured servants; many, including her birth parents, were sent to the space station as work, but died due to the dangerous upper levels. Reath struggles with Jora's death against the Nihil, and discovers that Nan and her partner are actually part of the Nihil. The Jedi realize that the idols actually were repressing the idols and by sealing them together they let loose the dark force; Cohmac and Orla are angered when the Jedi Council is unwilling to take the risk and return to Amaxine to solve the problem. Cohmac, Orla and Reath rejoin the Vessel and go back to Amaxine. On the lower levels, exploring the place of Dez's death he is transported in a pod to a planet taken over by the carnivorous plant-like beings Drengir, and sees that Dez is alive and being tortured. They escape, while Cohmac and Orla fight off Drengir on Amaxine, which is revealed to be a powerful structure that can transport pods to anywhere across the galaxy; the Nihil, seeing this as a means to further their plans of disorder across the Republic, board the structure and engage in the conflict. After a battle in which Reath vents the Drengir and Nihil into space, the Vessel and its inhabitants return to Coruscant once more. Reath and the Jedi are disciplined, but lauded for saving Dez. Orla leaves as a Wayseeker. Cohmac agrees to become Reath's new master. Reath decides that he is not an adventurer but will gladly step into the unknown if it means that his exploits can be properly archived in history. Affie exposes Scover and Byne Guild, and Leox lets her become the new captain of the Vessel. Nan reports to Marchion Ro, who ensures her that the Jedi will be eliminated.

=== Twenty-five years earlier ===
Orla and Cohmac, with their masters, are sent to rescue kidnapped dignitaries from the Directorate, a spinoff of the Hutts. Cohmac's master is killed, but he is unable to properly mourn for him due to the strict Jedi rules; this opens a darker part of himself, and he begins to confront whether the separation between the light side and dark side is really as clear-cut as it seems. They rescue the dignitaries, but one is killed; Orla believes that had she followed her instincts and acting how the Jedi forced her to act, then she could've saved both lives. The Hutts rise in power from this incident. It also motivates Orla and Cohmac into where they end up by the end of the present-day narrative.

== Characters ==
- Reath Silas: Padawan to Jedi Master Jora Malli.
- Affie Hollow: Operator in the Byne Guild and co-pilot of the starship Vessel.
- Leox Gyasi: Pilot of the Vessel, a scoundrel.
- Geode: A Vintian resembling a tall stationary slab of rock, navigator of the Vessel.
- Cohmac Vitus: A Jedi Master known as a scholar and mystic.
- Orla Jareni: An Umbaran Jedi Master and Wayseeker.
- Dez Rydan: A Jedi Knight and Malli's first apprentice.

== Reception ==
Bryan Young, writing for /Film, called the novel "a hell of an experience from one of the best writers working in Star Wars," noting the expansive cast, quirky tone, and the ways it deepened the mystery of the universe. Young sardonically lauded the character Geode as "the runaway star of the book [despite being] a character who doesn't speak...if there is anything people will be talking about after this book, it's going to be Geode and how utterly charming and hilarious he is." Kofi Outlaw of Comicbook.com acclaimed the novel as being "chock-full of wit and humor" among the "offbeat collection of characters." Den of Geek said that "Into the Dark [...] is a good introduction to the High Republic era, and a fun but not particularly deep Jedi fantasy."
