= J. Scott Campbell =

American comic book artist (born 1973)

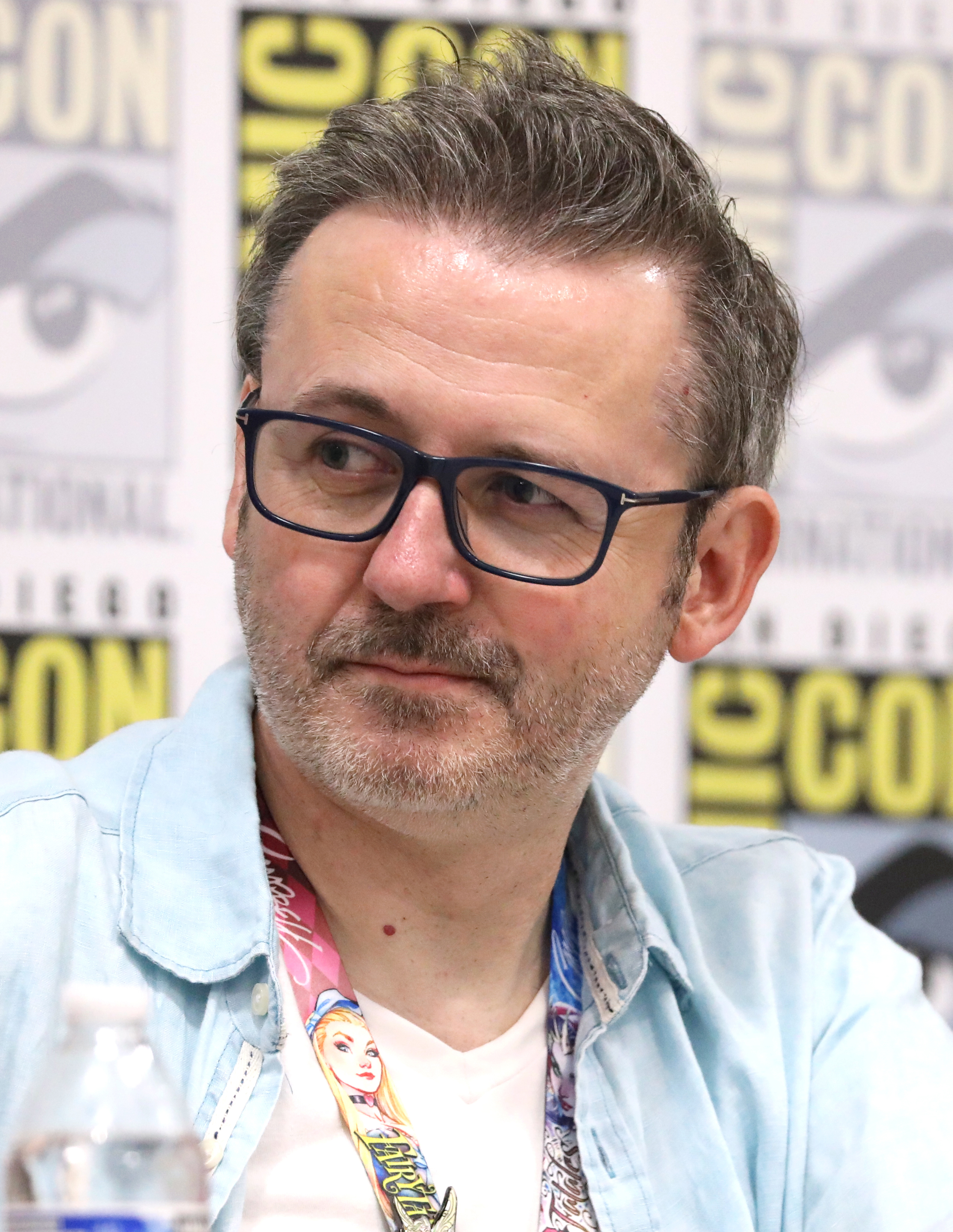
- Campbell at the 2023 San Diego Comic-Con
- Born: Jeffery Scott Campbell; April 12, 1973 (age 53) East Tawas, Michigan, U.S.
- Areas: Writer, Penciller
- Pseudonyms: J. Scott Campbell; Jeff Scott
- Notable works: Gen^{13} Danger Girl

Jeffery Scott Campbell (born April 12, 1973) is an American comic book artist. He was initially known professionally as Jeffery Scott, but is best known as J. Scott Campbell. He rose to fame as an artist for Wildstorm Comics, though he has since done work for Marvel Comics (most notably as a cover artist on The Amazing Spider-Man), and the video game industry.

== Early life ==
Jeffery Scott Campbell was born in East Tawas, Michigan, though he has no memories of that city, as his family moved when he was very young to Denver, Colorado, which he regards as his home. He has a younger sister, who is a digital architect who fills out the orders for Campbell's e-commerce website, and a younger brother who is a musician.

As a child, Campbell was interested in cartoons, rather than comics. He first became interested in comics when, as a teenager, he visited a friend's house, where his friend showed him Uncanny X-Men Annual #10, which featured artwork by Arthur Adams, whose style would greatly influence Campbell's own. Campbell, explains, "I immediately went nuts over the book. That book had such detail. The art was fantastic. It just started me going. It just turned me around. All of a sudden I wanted to do this, and I felt I could." Campbell began collecting, purchasing books based on the art, not the title, which he says made his collecting habits somewhat difficult at times.

In 1989, Campbell, then age fifteen, entered for and won an "Invent the Ultimate Video Game" contest featured in the issue 6 of Nintendo's official magazine, Nintendo Power, whereby submitted contest entries were to consist of drawings and concepts for a video game. Color drawings from Lockarm, the video game idea he pitched, were published in the May/June 1989 as the winning entry, marking his first nationally published work.

== Career ==
=== Wildstorm / DC Comics ===
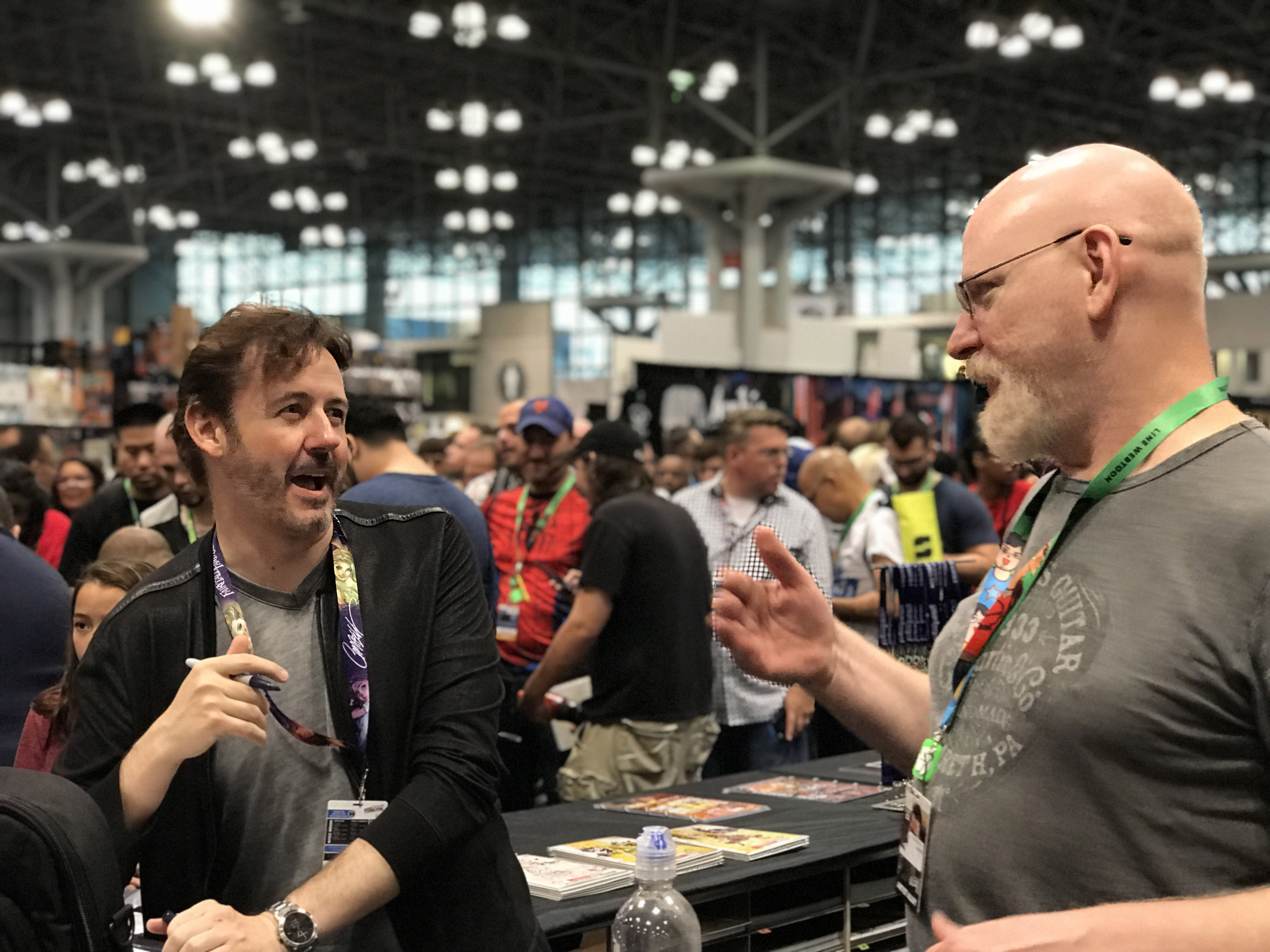
Campbell (left) was greatly influenced by Arthur Adams (right), seen here during an appearance at Campbell's booth at the 2017 New York Comic Con.

After graduating from high school in Aurora, Colorado, Campbell began doing freelance commercial art jobs. As Campbell prepared to show his samples at the 1993 San Diego Comic-Con, the series WildC.A.T.S premiered by Jim Lee's publishing studio, Wildstorm Productions (then called Homage Studios). One issue advertised a talent search for which readers could submit artwork, so Campbell put together a package that included a four-page WildC.A.T.S story and sent it in. A week and a half later, Jim Lee telephoned Campbell and asked him if he would move to San Diego to work for him. Initially working under the professional name Jeffery Scott, Campbell's first comics work was two pinups for the Homage Studios Swimsuit Special in 1993. His subsequent work for Wildstorm includes spot illustrations in WildC.A.T.S Sourcebook. and Stormwatch #0.

Campbell went on to co-create the teen superhero team Gen^{13}, which debuted in Deathmate Black (September 1993), before going on to star in their own five-issue miniseries in January 1994. The series was initially co-written by Brandon Choi and Jim Lee, but Campbell became a co-writer with issue #3. The team was eventually given their own regular ongoing series, which debuted in March 1995. Campbell was co-writer on the series until issue #18, and was the regular artist, leaving the book after issue #20 (June 1997).

In 1998, Campbell, together with fellow comics artists Joe Madureira and Humberto Ramos, founded the Cliffhanger imprint as part of Wildstorm Productions. He launched his comic series Danger Girl through this imprint. The story, which followed the adventures of a group of female secret agents, made the most of Campbell's talents drawing well-endowed women and dramatic action sequences.

The Danger Girl series has since generated a video game for the Sony PlayStation, as well as several comic spinoffs in the forms of limited series and one-shots that were drawn by different artists in the American comics industry. Most of these spin-offs featured story outlines from Campbell himself.

In August 2005, Campbell published Wildsiderz, which he co-created with his Danger Girl writing partner Andy Hartnell.

In February 2006, the 200th issue of Nintendo Power included a poster featuring prominent Nintendo characters drawn by Campbell in his unique art style, along with an interview whereby Campbell recalled his memories of the "Invent the Ultimate Video Game" Contest.

That same year, Campbell provided a variant incentive cover for Justice League of America (vol. 2) #0, the first issue of Brad Meltzer's run on the title.

In 2007, Campbell illustrated the covers to the Freddy vs. Jason vs. Ash six-issue limited series.

=== Marvel Comics ===
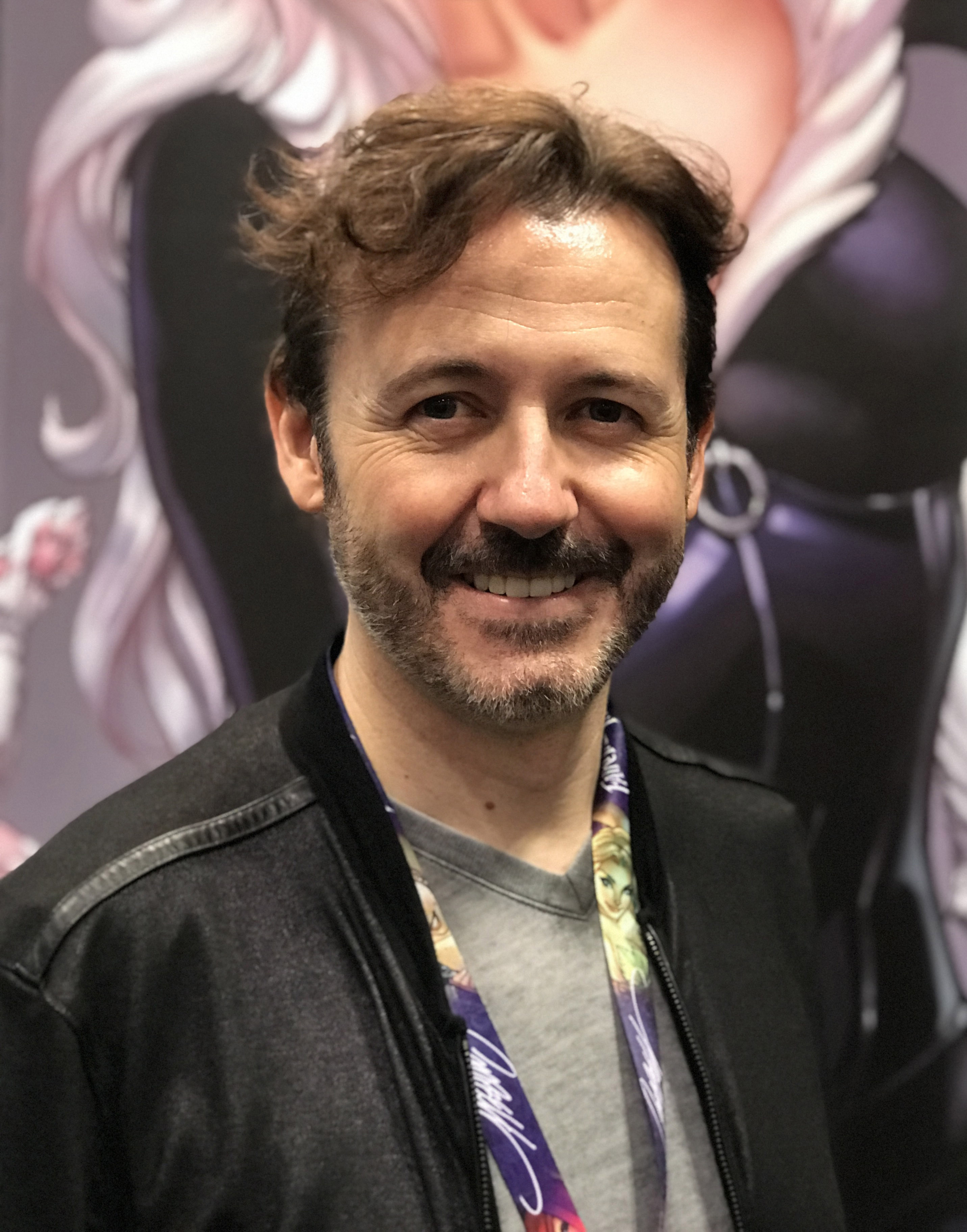
Campbell at the 2017 New York Comic Con

At the WizardWorld 2006 Comic Convention held in Los Angeles, Marvel Comics announced that Campbell signed an exclusive contract with the company, and to work on a Spider-Man series with writer Jeph Loeb. Between 2001 and 2013 Campbell did numerous covers for The Amazing Spider-Man, including issues 30 - 35 in 2001, 50 - 52 and 500 in 2003, and seven issues done sporadically from issues 601 in 2009 and 700 in 2013. His cover to issue #30 was used as the cover of the 2003 trade paperback that collected issues 30 and 31.

==== Campbell's "Apartment Series" and Iron Man ====
Campbell's cover for The Amazing Spider-Man #601 is notable for being the first in Campbell's "Apartment Series", which depict Spider-Man or one of his love interests or supporting characters sitting in a sofa in their apartment in a "slice of life" scene, usaully with Spider-Man himself seen in a window swinging through the city. Subsequent covers that were part of this series included The Amazing Spider-Man: Renew Your Vows #1 and #2 in 2015, Black Cat #1 in 2019 (which depicts Felicia Hardy) and 2025's Ultimate Spider-Man #4, which depicts an alternate version of Spider-Man/Peter Parker, his wife, Mary Jane, and their two children. When asked about his approach to Spider-Man, Campbell said, "The Spider-Man universe is maybe the most 'human' to me in the super hero realm. By that, I mean Peter Parker, MJ, and Gwen. They're more relatable to us because they're grounded, compared to, let's say, the X-Men or the Avengers. I think we inherently connect more with characters we can relate to or imagine interacting with in our own lives." In 2019, Sideshow Collectibles made a collectible maquette out of Campbell's cover to Renew Your Vows #1.

The image to Amazing #601 became fodder for memes, and later, charges of sexism. In October 2016, the head editor of G33k Pop, who went by the online name CalebH/Discordia said of the image:

"The cover has made me angry since I first saw it, since it showcases everything wrong with the comics industry as a whole, not just Campbell's art. Mary Jane Watson is one of the strongest supporting characters in the Spider-Man universe, she runs her own club, she has saved Spidey countless times and even gained spider powers of her own in the Spider Island event. Yet here she is shown as being the stay at home wife who worries about her husband constantly and has nothing else to do, but still manages to contort her body to show off her impossibly thin body and other...features."

Analyzing common elements across Campbell's cover work, CalebH said, "One key feature in most is that the woman is featured prominently, often from an angle that looks down on the woman. I could go full feminazi here and claim that this makes it so that the reader is looking down on women, but I won't. However, I will say that this angle is done so you're essentially looking down her shirt. There is no real hiding it. When a man is the main focus of a cover, the angle is usually facing straight forward, showing him looking all heroic, but the high up angle is used far too often for female characters, almost always in oversexualized positions."

In May 2021, Campbell garnered notice for responding to a Tumblr user named nonbinaryfinnmertens, (later buunbi) who, objecting to what they believed was an overly sexual depiction of the character Mary Jane, modified the image to de-emphasize the character's cleavage, cover her exposed stomach, and pose her in a more casual manner, a practice known as "art fixing". The altered image was accompanied by the caption "I made an attempt at fixing this because it was, so bad lol. It's not perfect but it's better than it was so that's all that matters lol. Just don't look to closely at it it's fine." The post had originally been made in late 2020, but when nonbinaryfinnmertens reposted it several months later, Campbell, who viewed the practice as an "obnoxious trend" that had a negative impact on the broader "artistic community", responded to this on his Instagram page by saying of the modified version of the image, "I can't help but notice that rather than looking relaxed and cozied into the couch with her warm coffee as in the original, MJ instead now has the energy of a perky obedient puppy! This doesn't seem to be the MJ I know, but who am I to say...Hey maybe Nonbinarryfinn is onto something. Maybe unsolicited correcting no one asked for is fun!!" Campbell posted an illustrated anatomical breakdown of the character to defend its validity. The reaction to Campbell's post was polarized, with some supporting his position and criticizing the act of posting unsolicited alterations of an artist's work as a form of public shaming. Fellow artists such as Mark Brooks and Ethan Van Sciver agreed that the practice of "art fixing" was wrong, though Van Sciver thought it was a waste of time for Campbell to respond to nonbinaryfinnmertens. while others admonished Campbell, an established artist, for criticizing an unknown online critic, and offering encourgaement to nonbinaryfinnmertens. Rich Johnston, an industry reporter for Bleeding Cool, defended nonbinaryfinnmertens by arguing that anonymous non-experts had the right to express critical views of professionals, even those held in high esteem like Campbell, and that Campbell's public rebuke was disproportionate, owing to the power imbalance between him and nonbinaryfinnmertens, and disingenuous, in light of the fact that Campbell himself had mocked the cover a few years prior. Some viewed nonbinaryfinnmertens's gesture as a critque of the how many comics artists ' work served to objectify women through a strictly heteronormative viewpoint. On this point, Campbell told Business Insider, "My art is certainly pretty sexy at times, on rare occasions perhaps even a bit sexual. But in all actuality, my artwork is far more in the spirit of the girl-next-door pin-up calendar art of the 1950s and '60s." In 2019, Campbell parodied the controversy in Marvel Comics #1000, to which he had contributed a page of interior art, one panel of which depicted Mary Jane, slouched on the sofa while eating potato chips, and remarking, "You don't actually think I sit that way, do you?"

In 2024 the original art to Campbell's cover to Amazing #601 was sold at auction for $144,000 by Heritage Auctions. In 2026 Sideshow released a fine art print of the image.

In October 2016, Marvel Comics and New York-based retailer Midtown Comics jointly decided to pull from circulation Campbell's variant cover of the first issue of The Invincible Iron Man, produced exclusively for that store, after previews of the cover were criticized for sexualizing the depicted character, 15-year-old Riri Williams, an MIT engineering student who reverse engineered one of Iron Man's armored suits to wear herself. The image depicted her in a midriff-baring crop top, in contrast to the more modest way in which artist Stefano Caselli depicted the character in the book's interior art. Campbell called the decision "unfortunate," explaining that his rendition of the character was intended to depict "a sassy, coming-of-age young woman". He regarded the reaction to the cover as a "faux controversy", saying, "I gave her a sassy 'attitude'...'sexualizing' was not intended. This reaction is odd." Brian Michael Bendis, the writer on the series, was pleased with the decision to pull the cover, saying that while he liked the face Campbell had drawn on Riri when he viewed the art as a work in progress, he disliked the completed art, saying, "Specialty covers are not in my purview and it was being produced separately from the work of the people involved in making the comic. Not to pass the buck but that's the fact. If I had seen a sketch or something I would have voiced similar concerns. I am certain the next version will be amazing."

== Technique and materials ==
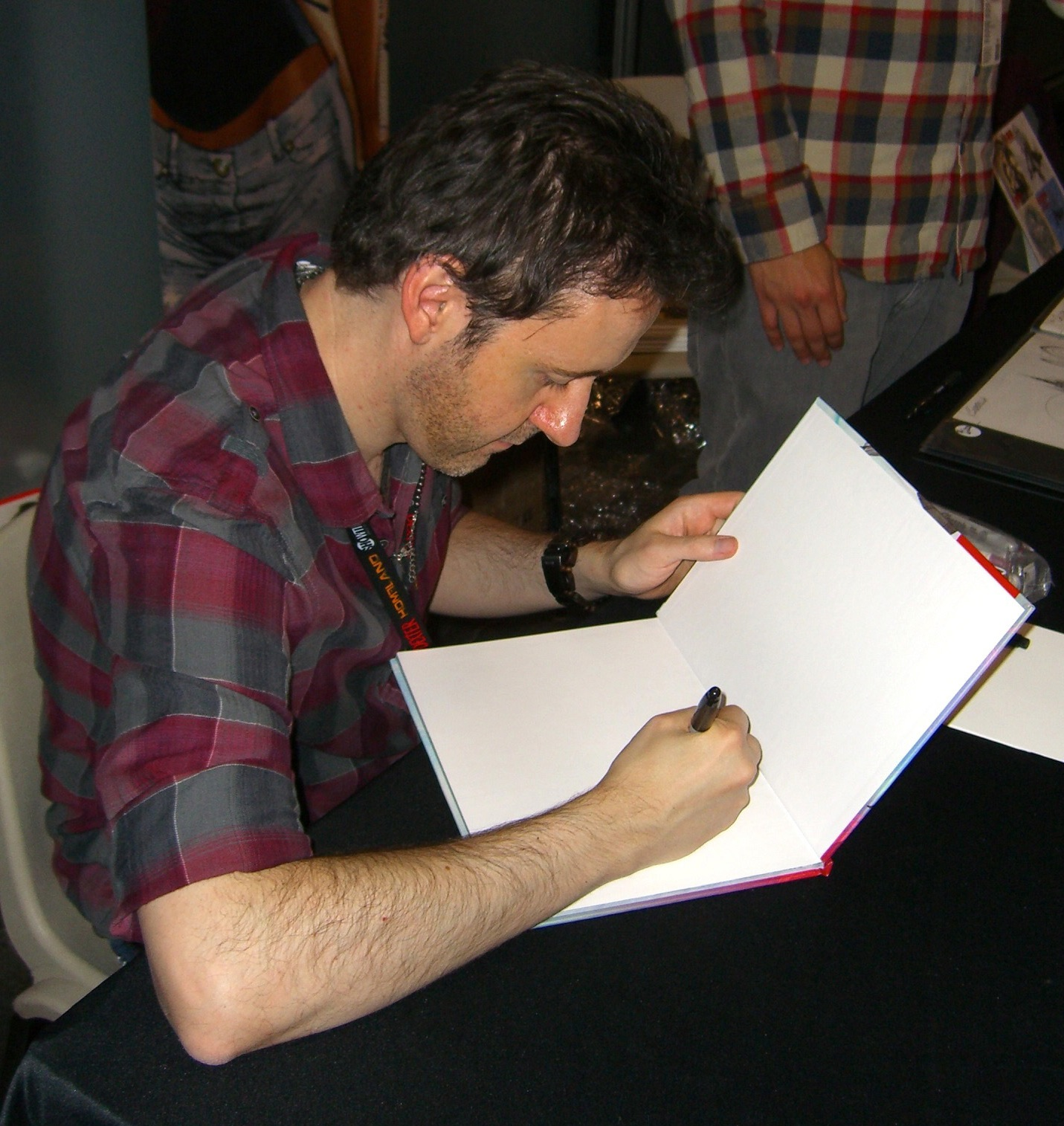
Campbell sketching

Campbell does his pencil with a lead holder, and Sanford Turquoise H lead, which he uses for its softness and darkness, and for its ability to provide a "sketchy" feel, with a minimal amount of powdery lead smearing. He prefers this lead because it strikes a balance between too hard, and therefore not dark enough on the page, and too soft, and therefore prone to smearing and crumbling. Campbell avoids its closest competitor because he finds it too waxy. Campbell has also used HB lead and F lead. He maintains sharpness of the lead with a Berol Turquoise sharpener, changing them every four to six months, which he finds is the duration of their grinding ability. Campbell uses a combination of Magic Rub erasers, eraser sticks, and since he began to ink his work digitally, a Sakura electric eraser. He often sharpens the eraser to a cornered edge in order to render fine detailed work.

In 2026, when drawing his exclusive cover for Absolute Batman #25, Campbell used 11” x 17” Strathmore Bristol vellum because it possessed what he described as "a toothier quality that adds a bit of texture and grit to the inking, which suits the world of Batman well."

Campbell primarily inks with Faber-Castell PITT artist pens XS, S, & 1.5s, and he typically goes through 2 - 3 of them per page.

== Awards ==
In 2023, Campbell was a recipient of the Inkpot Award at the annual San Diego Comic Con.
