= Cavan Scott =

British comic writer and author

- Born: 18 April 1973 (age 53); Bristol, United Kingdom
- Occupations: Comic Writer, Author, Screenwriter
- Writing career
- Period: 2000–present
- Website: cavanscott.com

Cavan Scott (born 18 April 1973) is a New York Times bestselling comic writer and author. He is best known for his work on a variety of spin-offs from both Doctor Who and Star Wars, as well as comics and novels for Teen Titans, Black Adam, Ghostbusters, Transformers, Back to the Future, Vikings, Pacific Rim, Sherlock Holmes, and Penguins of Madagascar.

Cavan Scott, along with Justina Ireland, Claudia Gray, Daniel Jose Older, and Charles Soule are crafting a new era in the Star Wars publishing world called Star Wars: The High Republic. Scott's first contribution to the era was a comic book series released through Marvel Comics titled Star Wars: The High Republic, and he has also written two novels in the series, the New York Times bestseller, The Rising Storm and Path of Vengeance, numerous short stories in Star Wars Insider and the Life Day Treasury, a four issue mini-series for IDW, The Monster of Temple Peak and the audio drama, Tempest Runner.

In April 2020, Vault Comics announced their supernatural spy series Shadow Service, written by Cavan Scott with art by Corin M. Howell, for release in July 2020. This was Cavan Scott's first creator-owned comic series. He has since written three more creator-owned series: The Ward, from Dark Horse Comics, Sleep Terrors from Legendary Comics, and Dead Seas from Dark Horse.

In April 2016, his 2016 World Book Day book Star Wars: The Escape became the UK's number one bestselling book.

He was also script editor on the first series of Highlander audiobooks and produced Blakes 7 for Big Finish Productions.

He has written a number of books based upon the BBC Television series Countryfile and Planet Dinosaur, as well as children's books and comic based on such popular children's franchises Skylanders, Disney Infinity, Adventure Time, and Angry Birds.

He wrote a series of Sherlock Holmes novels for Titan Books, the first of which, "The Patchwork Devil", was published in 2016.

Scott conceived and launched Countryfile Magazine in 2007 and has written for over 30 national magazines and newspapers. He regularly appears on local and national radio commentating on rural affairs and has been a judge of various countryside awards including the RSPB Farming for Nature Award and the FARMA Farm Retailer of the Year. He appeared on BBC Breakfast to discuss the casting of Peter Capaldi as Doctor Who's Twelfth Doctor.

He also wrote serialized children's books for Fiction Express, including two volumes of Snaffles the Cat Burglar. In May 2025, he wrote The All-New All-Deadly Gwenpool for Marvel Comics.

== Works ==
=== Comics ===
- Star Wars
  - Star Wars Adventures (2017), published by IDW Publishing
  - Star Wars Adventures: Heroes of the Galaxy (2017), published by IDW Publishing
  - Star Wars Adventures: Defend the Republic (2017), published by IDW Publishing
  - Star Wars Adventures: Smuggler’s Blues (2018), published by IDW Publishing
  - Star Wars Adventures: Tales from Vader’s Castle (2018), published by IDW Publishing
  - Star Wars Adventures: Return to Vader’s Castle (2019), published by IDW Publishing
  - Star Wars Adventures: Shadow of Vader’s Castle (2020), published by IDW Publishing
  - Star Wars Adventures: Ghosts of Vader’s Castle (2021), published by IDW Publishing
  - Star Wars: The High Republic (2021), published by Marvel Comics
  - Star Wars: The High Republic: The Monster of Temple Peak (2021), published by IDW Publishing
  - Star Wars: Life Day (2021), published by Marvel Comics
  - Star Wars: The High Republic (2022), published by Marvel Comics
  - Star Wars: Yoda (2022), publisher by Marvel Comics
  - Star Wars: Tales From the Rancor’s Pit (2022), published by Dark Horse Comics
- Creator-owned comics
  - Shadow Service (2020), published by Vault Comics
  - The Ward (2022), published by Dark Horse Comics
  - Sleep Terrors (2022), published by Legendary Comics
  - Dead Seas (2022), published by IDW Publishing
- DC Superheroes
  - Titans United (2021–2022), published by DC Comics
  - Black Adam: The Justice Society Files (2022), published by DC Comics
  - Black Adam (2022) published by DC Comics
  - Titan United: Bloodpact (2022), published by DC Comics
- Doctor Who
  - Mistaken Identity (2010), in Doctor Who Adventures
  - Creature Feature (2010), in Doctor Who Adventures
  - Doctor Who - The Ninth Doctor (2015–2017), published by Titan Comics
  - Doctor Who - Holiday Special (2015), published by Titan Comics
  - Doctor Who - Supremacy of the Cybermen (2016), published by Titan Comics
- Vikings
  - Vikings (2016), published by Titan Comics
  - Vikings: Uprising (2016), published by Titan Comics
  - Vikings: Godhead (2017), published by Titan Comics
- Power Rangers
  - Game Over (2005), in Jetix Magazine
  - Starr Stuck (2004), in Jetix Magazine
- Nick Nitro & Booster (Ongoing, 2010–2011) in Nitro
- Krash Test Bunny (Ongoing, 2010–2011) in Nitro
- Minnie The Minx, Roger the Dodger, The Bash Street Kids, Gnasher and Gnipper, Bananaman (2014–present) in The Beano
- Adventure Time (2015), published by Titan Comics
- Penguins of Madagascar - (2015–2016), published by Titan Comics
- Not with a Bang (2016), published in Vertigo: SFX by Vertigo Comics
- Tekken: Blood Feud - (2017), published by Titan Comics
- Star Wars Adventures Annual: The Lost Eggs of Livorno-(2018), published by IDW Publishing
- Pacific Rim: Aftermath (2018) published by Legendary Comics
- Pacific Rim: Amara (2019) published by Legendary Comics
- Pacific Rim: Black-out (2021) Published by Legendary Comics
- Sonic the Hedgehog Annual: Curse of the Pyramid (2019), published by IDW Publishing
- Ghostbusters 35th Anniversary Collection (2019), published by IDW Publishing
- Transformers/Back to the Future (2020), published by IDW Publishing
- Assassin's Creed Valhalla: Song of Glory (2020), published by Dark Horse Comics
- The All-New All-Deadly Gwenpool (2025), published by Marvel Comics

=== Books ===
- Doctor Who
  - Wit, Wisdom, and Timey-Wimey Stuff: The Quotable Dr. Who (2001) (with Mark Wright)
  - Project: Valhalla (2005) (with Mark Wright)
  - The Sarah Jane Adventures: Wraith World (2010)
  - Who-ology: The Official Doctor Who Miscellany (2013) (with Mark Wright)
  - Doctor Who: Dalek (2017) (with George Mann and Justin Richards)
  - Doctor Who: The Shining Man (2017)
  - Doctor Who: The Ninth Doctor: Volume 1 Weapons of Past Destruction (2017) (with Blair Shedd and Rachael Stott)
  - Doctor Who: The Ninth Doctor: Volume 2 Doctormania (2017) (with Adriana Melo and Chris Bolson)
  - Doctor Who: The Ninth Doctor: Volume 3 Official Secrets (2017) (with Adriana Melo and Chris Bolson)
  - Doctor Who: The Ninth Doctor: Volume 4 Sin Eaters (2018) (with Adriana Melo and Chris Bolson)
  - Doctor Who: The Missy Chronicles (2018) (with Jac Rayner, Paul Magrs, James Gross, Peter Anghelides, Richard Dinnick)
  - Who-ology: The Official Doctor Who Miscellany: The Regenerated Edition (2018) (with Mark Wright)
  - Doctor Who: The Lost Dimension Book One (2018) (with George Mann, Nick Abadzis, Rachael Stott, Cris Bolson, Adriana Melo, Mariano Laclaustra, Leandro Casco, Iolanda Zanfardino, Rod Fernandes, Marco Lesko, Carlos Cabrera, Triona Farrell, and Hi-Fi)
  - Doctor Who: The Lost Dimension Book Two (2018) (with George Mann, Nick Abadzis, Rachael Stott, Mariano Laclaustra, Alex Ronald, Leondro Casco)
- Countryfile
  - Countryfile: Great British Walks (2010), (Editor)
  - Countryfile Perfect Days Out (2010)
  - John Craven's Countryfile Companion (2010) (collaboration with John Craven)
  - Countryfile: Adam's Farm: My Life on the Land (2011) (with Adam Henson)
- The Obverse Book of Ghosts (2010) (Editor)
- Planet Dinosaur (2011)
- Blake's 7: The Forgotten (2012) (with Mark Wright)
- Skylanders
  - Skylanders: The Machine of Doom (2012) (writing as Onk Beakman)
  - Skylanders: Official Annual 2013 (2012)
  - Skylanders: Quiz Quest (2012)
  - Skylanders: The Mask of Power: Spyro vs the Mega Monsters (2013) (writing as Onk Beakman)
  - Skylanders: The Mask of Power: Gill Grunt and the Curse of the Fishmaster (2013) (writing as Onk Beakman)
  - Skylanders: The Mask of Power: Lightning Rod faces the Cyclops Queen (2013) (writing as Onk Beakman)
  - Skylanders: Official Annual 2014 (2013)
  - Skylanders: The A-Z of Skylands (2013)
  - Skylanders Giants: Master Eon’s Official Guide (2013)
  - Skylanders Universe: The Ultimate Guide (2014)
  - Skylanders SWAP Force: Master Eon’s Official Guide (2014)
  - Skylanders: The Mask of Power: Terrifin Battles The Boom Brother (2014) (writing as Onk Beakman)
  - Skylanders: The Mask of Power: Cynder Comfronts the Weather Wizard (2014) (writing as Onk Beakman)
  - Skylanders: Time Twister (2014) (writing as Onk Beakman)
  - Skylanders: The Mask of Power: Erupter Meets the Nightmare Kings (2014) (writing as Onk Beakman)
  - Skylanders: Official Annual 2015 (2014)
  - Skylanders: The Mask of Power: Trigger Happy Targets The Evil Kaos (2014) (writing as Onk Beakman)
  - Skylanders: The Mask of Power: Stump Smash Crosses the Bone Dragon (2016) (writing as Onk Beakman)
- Angry Birds
  - The Angry Birds Official Sticker Book (2013)
  - The World of Angry Birds Official Guide (2013)
  - Angry Birds Treasure Island (2015)
- The Official Beano Sticker Book (2014)
- Mama Barkfingers (2014)
- The Hunted (2014)
- Billy Button (2014)
- Pest Control (2014)
- The Changeling (2014)
- Snaffles the Cat Burglar (2014)
- Warhammer 40,000: Plague Harvest (2015)
- Dennis the Menace: The Golden Catapult (2015)
- Penguins of Madagascar
  - Penguins of Madagascar: Operation: Heist (2015)
  - Penguins of Madagascar: Elitist of the Elite (2016)
  - Penguins of Madagascar: Secret Paws (2016)
- Adventure Park
  - Adventure Park: Pirate Peril (2016)
  - Adventure Park: Dinosaur Danger (2016)
  - Adventure Park: Rainforest Riot (2016)
  - Adventure Park: Medieval Madness (2016)
  - Adventure Park: Monster Mayhem (2016)
  - Adventure Park: Cosmic Chaos (2016)
  - Adventure Park: Candy Crisis (2016)
  - Adventure Park: Pyramid Panic (2016)
- LEGO DC Super Heroes Character Encyclopedia (2016)
- Snaffles and the Moonfish Mystery (2016)
- Curious Cal and the Wish Machine (2016)
- Sherlock Holmes: The Patchwork Devil (2016)
- Star Wars
  - Star Wars: Adventures in Wild Space - The Escape (2016)
  - Star Wars: Adventures in Wild Space - The Snare (2016)
  - Star Wars: Adventures in Wild Space - The Steal (2016)
  - Star Wars: Adventures in Wild Space - The Cold (2017)
  - Choose Your Destiny: A Han and Chewie Adventure (2018) (with Elsa Charretier)
  - Choose Your Destiny: A Luke and Leia Adventure (2018) (with Elsa Charretier)
  - Dooku, Jedi Lost (2019)
  - Choose Your Destiny: An Obi-Wan and Anakin Adventure (2019) (with Elsa Charretier)
  - Choose Your Destiny: A Finn and Poe Adventure (2019) (with Elsa Charretier)
  - Star Wars: The Rising Storm (2021)
  - Star Wars: Path of Vengeance (2023)
- The Afterblight Chronicles
  - Children of the Cull (2016)
  - End of the End (2016) (with Paul Kane and Simon Guerrier)
- Sherlock Holmes: Cry of the Innocent (2017)
- Ali-A Adventures: Game On (2017) (with Ali-A and Aleksandar Sotirovski)
- Copa90: Our World Cup – A fan’s guide to 2018 (2018) (with Aladair Cullen, Jack Harry, Gaby Kirschner, Eli Mengem, Martino Simcik, Neil Stacey, Lawrence Tallis, and Kevin McGivern)
- Warhammer Adventures: Warped Galaxies
  - Attack of the Necron (2019)
  - Claws of the Genestealer (2019)
  - Secrets of the Tau (2019)

=== Radio plays ===
- Doctor Who
  - Project: Twilight (2001) (with Mark Wright)
  - The Church and the Crown (2002) (with Mark Wright)
  - Project Lazarus (2003) (with Mark Wright)
  - The Prisoner of Peladon (2009) (with Mark Wright)
  - Project: Destiny (2010) (with Mark Wright)
  - The Many Deaths of Jo Grant (2011) (with Mark Wright)
  - The Nu-Humans (2012) (with Mark Wright)
  - The Companion Chronicles - Project: Nirvana (2012) (with Mark Wright)
  - Night of the Whisper (2013) (with Mark Wright)
  - Masters of Earth (2015) with Mark Wright)
  - Eternal Battle (2017) (with Mark Wright)
  - The Lost Angel (2017)
  - The Lost Magic (2017)
  - The Lost Flame (2017) (with George Mann)
  - The Bleeding Heart in The Ninth Doctor Chronicles (2017) (with Una McCormack, Scott Handcock, and James Goss)
  - Devil in the Mist (2019)
- 2000 AD
  - Judge Dredd: For King and Country (2003)
- Counter-Measures
  - Peshka (2013) (with Mark Wright)
- The Tomorrow People
  - The Warlock's Dance (2004)
- Highlander
  - Kurgan Rising (2009) (with Mark Wright)
- Blake's 7
  - The Armageddon Storm Parts 1-3 (2013) (with Mark Wright)
  - Blake's Story (2013) (with Mark Wright)
  - Defector (2014) (with Mark Wright)
  - Planetfall (2014) (with Mark Wright)
  - Secrets (2014) (with Mark Wright)
  - Cold Fury (2013) (with Mark Wright)
  - Caged (2013) (with Mark Wright)
  - Shock Troops as a part of Crossfire Part 2 Box Set (2018)
- Pathfinder Chronicles
  - The Skin Saw Murders (2015)
  - Fortress of the Stone Giants (2015)
  - The Spires of Xin-Shalast (2015)
  - The Half-Dead City (2015)
  - Empty Graves (2015)
  - Shifting Sands (2016)
- The Omega Factor
  - Legion (2015)
- The Confessions of Dorian Gray
  - Heart and Soul (2015)
- Iris Wildthyme
  - Iris Wildthyme and the Claws of Santa (2009) (with Mark Wright)
  - The Iris Wildthyme Appreciation Society (2012)
  - Whatever Happened to Iris Widthyme (2013) (with Mark Wright)
  - High Spirits (2015)
  - "Vienna: Underworld" in Vienna Series 02 (2015)
  - Counter-Measures: New Horizons (2015) (with Mark Wright)
- Star Wars: Dooku, Jedi Lost (2019)
- Sherlock Holmes: The Voice of Treason (2020) (with George Mann)
- Star Wars: The High Republic: Tempest Runner (2021)

=== Short stories ===
- Star Wars
  - "Time of Death" (2017), in From a Certain Point of View
  - "Fake It Till You Make It" (2020), in The Empire Strikes Back - From a Certain Point of View
- Doctor Who
  - "Priceless Junk" (2009), in Short Trips: Indefinable Magic (with Mark Wright)
  - "Twilight's End" (2008), in Short Trips: Defining Patterns (with Mark Wright)
  - "Faithful Friends" (2007), in Short Trips: The Ghosts of Christmas (with Mark Wright)
  - "Be Forgot" (2004), in Short Trips: A Christmas Treasury (with Mark Wright)
  - "Feast of the Stone" (2004), in BBC Vampires (with Mark Wright)
  - "Inmate 280" (2003), in Short Trips: Steel Skies
- Warhammer 40,000
  - "Doom Flight" (2013)
  - "Flayed" (2017)
- Judge Dredd
  - "Dog Fight" (2005), in The Judge Dredd Megazine
  - "'Roaches" (2013), in The Judge Dredd Megazine
- Iris Wildthyme
  - "The Unhappy Medium" (2009), in Iris Wildthyme and the Celestial Omnibus (with Mark Wright)
  - "The Colonic in Space" (2010), in Iris: Abroad (with Mark Wright)
- Original works
  - "Graveyard Slot" (2005), in The Undead
  - "The Last" (2007), in Desolate Places
  - "Missed Call" (2010), in The Obverse Book of Ghosts
  - "Fairest of them All" (2013) in Resurrection Engines
  - "The Demon Slasher of Seven Sisters" (2013), in The Encounters of Sherlock Holmes
- "Alternative Facts" (2017), in Judge Dredd: Year Two Omnibus

== Television credits ==
- Star Wars: Jedi Temple Challenge (2020, additional writing for all 10 episodes)
- Star Wars: Young Jedi Adventures
  - Segment: "Charhound Chase" (2023)
  - Segment: "The Great Gourd Quest" (2024)
  - Segment: "Yoda Rescue" (2025)
