= Muse (character) =

Marvel Comics supervillain

- Muse as featured on the textless cover of Daredevil vol. 5 #14 (December 2016). Art by Dan Panosian.

Publication information
- Publisher: Marvel Comics
- First appearance: First Muse: Daredevil vol. 5 #11; (September 2016); Second Muse (Morgan Whittier): Daredevil: Unleash Hell – Red Band #1 (January 2025)
- Created by: First Muse: Charles Soule (writer); Ron Garney (artist); Morgan Whittier: Erica Schultz (writer); Valentina Pinti (artist)

In-story information
- Alter ego: Unknown (first Muse); Morgan Whittier
- Species: Inhuman (first Muse); Human (Morgan Whittier)
- Place of origin: Hell's Kitchen, New York City
- Notable aliases: Vincent van Gore (first Muse)
- Abilities: Both: Superhuman strength and speed; Imperceptibility; Expert combatant

Muse is the alias of two supervillains appearing in American comic books published by Marvel Comics. Created by writer-editor Charles Soule and artist Ron Garney, the character first appeared in Daredevil vol. 5 #11 (September 2016). The original Muse is an Inhuman serial killer artist who plans shocking mass murders, abductions, and torture as a means of creating his "art", converting them into works of street graffiti. He serves as an antagonist to Daredevil, Punisher, and Blindspot. Following the death of the original Muse, his ghost guides fellow artist Morgan Whittier as the second Muse.

Two human incarnations of Muse appear in the television series Daredevil: Born Again, set in the Marvel Cinematic Universe. Hunter Doohan portrayed Bastian Cooper in the first season (2025), while Margarita Levieva portrays Heather Glenn, who will become the second Muse in the third season (2027).

== Publication history ==
Muse first appeared in Daredevil vol. 5 #11 (September 2016) in the story arc "Dark Art", and was created by Charles Soule and Ron Garney. The second Muse (Morgan Whittier) first appeared in Daredevil: Unleash Hell – Red Band #1 (January 2025) and was created by Erica Schultz and Valentina Pinti.

== Fictional character biography ==
=== First Muse ===
The first mural of Muse was discovered by the vigilante Blindspot in Washington Heights, painted with the blood of over a hundred people. His second, working in competition with himself, featured the corpses of six Inhumans posed with props as if they were performing everyday tasks. After being tracked down by Blindspot and Daredevil during preparation for his next piece, Muse gouged Blindspot's eyes out to distract the Devil of Hell's Kitchen, and broke his own fingers upon his capture to avoid giving Daredevil the satisfaction.

Following Wilson Fisk's rise to power as the Mayor of New York and his establishment of anti-vigilante laws, Muse escaped from his prison, killing twelve correction officers, and continued his work, inspired by Daredevil's fight of justice in spite of the persecution. In their way of supporting the vigilantes, Muse vandalized numerous landmarks of Manhattan with giant-sized irremovable graffiti that featured different vigilantes. While Muse was painting a Punisher graffiti, he was intercepted by a group of police officers, whom he killed and adorned the graffiti with their bodies. Mayor Fisk used this to push his anti-vigilantism agenda, blaming Punisher for what happened.

Muse soon comes to blows with Blindspot again, with the latter defeating Muse thanks to the power of Krahllak. Losing to Blindspot spurs Muse to commit suicide, allowing himself to be consumed by fire.

Muse's spirit is sent to Hell, where he ends up influencing Morgan Whittier from beyond the grave, appearing to her as a ghost.

=== Morgan Whittier ===
After Muse died, his spirit was sent to Hell. While there, he encountered the rejected soul of an artist named Morgan Whittier and decided to influence her from beyond the grave by giving her art advice and continuing his work as a new Muse. Initially, he appears as a voice to her and later as a ghost-like figure.

== Powers and abilities ==
Muse's body acts like a vortex which can absorb any kind of sensory information that surrounds him, making Muse incredibly hard to track, with even Daredevil struggling to target him. Muse's superhuman speed also helps with this, as he is able to move faster than the human eye can see, allowing him to remain out of sight. He has levels of superhuman strength that are far beyond normal humans, proved by his power to swiftly lift and move many dead bodies. Muse is also very agile, and may potentially be able to climb walls as well as Spider-Man, as he is able to quickly paint giant murals of several superheroes across the entire facades of buildings. He is also a skilled hand-to-hand combatant, able to take down even the most skilled soldiers or vigilantes.

== In other media ==
- Muse appears in the first season of Daredevil: Born Again (2025), portrayed by Hunter Doohan. This version is a human serial killer named Bastian Cooper who is well-versed in taekwondo. During a fight with Daredevil, Muse is killed by Heather Glenn (Margarita Levieva).
  - In the third season of Born Again (2027), Glenn takes on the mantle of Muse.
