= Star Wars: The High Republic =

Epic science fantasy space opera franchise

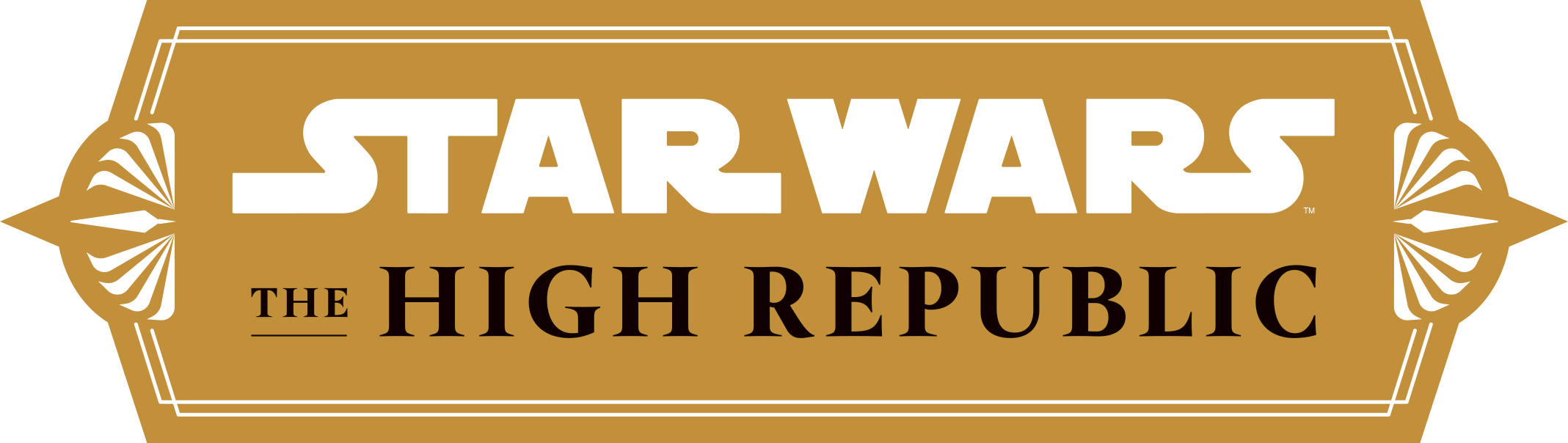
- Owner: Lucasfilm
- Years: Phase I: 2021–2022; Phase II: 2022–2023; Phase III: 2023–2025

Print publications
- Novel(s): List of novels
- Comics: List of comics

Films and television
- Television series: The Acolyte (2024)
- Animated series: Young Jedi Adventures (2023–2025)

Miscellaneous
- Timeline: approx. 500 BBY—100 BBY
- Preceded by: The Old Republic
- Succeeded by: Fall of the Jedi (Prequel trilogy)

Star Wars: The High Republic is a multimedia project consisting of various stories from the Star Wars franchise set in its fictional universe during the "High Republic" era, which spans approx. 500 to 100 years before the Skywalker Saga and is set hundreds of years after the fall of the "Old Republic". The initiating event of the sub-franchise is "The Great Disaster" involving the antagonistic "space Vikings" known as the Nihil and the subsequent intervention of the Jedi.

The series' novel series is divided into three phases. The first, Light of the Jedi, ran from January 2021 to February 2022. The second phase, Quest of the Jedi, started in October 2022. The third phase, Trials of the Jedi, began in November 2023 with the release of George Mann's novel The Eye of Darkness. The series' television series includes Young Jedi Adventures (2023–2025) and The Acolyte (2024).

== Premise ==
The High Republic era was a golden age for both the Galactic Republic and the Jedi Order who were both at the height of their power. Importantly, it was a time of peace for the Republic and the Republic was expanding into previously unreached areas in the Outer Rim. The Jedi Order worked as a distinct entity separate from the Republic and the Order was at its most diverse and transparent, donning golden robes and wielding the Force to a much greater extent. The Jedi were primarily based on Coruscant but a number of Jedi Temples were scattered across the galaxy on every major Republic planet.

== History ==
"Project Luminous" was started in September 2018 with invitations to Star Wars authors including Claudia Gray, Justina Ireland, Daniel José Older, Cavan Scott, and Charles Soule to Skywalker Ranch, with Lucasfilm offering them a "blank slate" in determining the project. Lucasfilm had teased "Project Luminous" in April 2019, prompting intense fan speculation.

On February 24, 2020, Lucasfilm announced a new series of comics and novels called Star Wars: The High Republic, intended to be a publisher-only multimedia project, unrelated to any films in development. A trailer was released showing events taking place two centuries before the events of Star Wars: Episode I – The Phantom Menace. It shows the Jedi at the height of their power and rise of the Nihil.

The series was originally intended to debut with the Light of the Jedi novel in August 2020, a few days before Star Wars Celebration 2020, but was delayed due to the COVID-19 pandemic until January 2021. The first chapter of the novel was released in June 2020 through IGN. In November 2020, the second chapter of the novel was released on StarWars.com, followed by the next six through the Penguin Random House website. In December 2020, Disney released a free digital sampler of early chapters of the first phase of High Republic books and comics, revealing the main characters for each series.

On Disney Investor Day 2020, it was revealed that Leslye Headland's The Acolyte series for Disney+ would take place during the late High Republic era. Shortly after, Tencent began releasing Star Wars: The Vow of Silver Dawn, an e-book created specifically for Chinese audiences in collaboration with Lucasfilm. The Vow of Silver Dawn also takes place near the end of the High Republic era. Lucasfilm has stated that they currently have no plans for an English translation and release.

On January 4, 2021, a day prior to the release of the first novels, Lucasfilm hosted a launch event where it gave more information regarding the works released following the first batch of novels and comics. This included the fact that Star Wars Insider would have monthly short stories as part of the publishing initiative, written by Scott and Ireland, several newly announced books releasing in the summer of 2021, and that the first phase of The High Republic would last into 2022. The second phase was given the name Quest of the Jedi, and the third, Trials of the Jedi.

== Works ==
=== Phase I — Light of the Jedi ===
==== Short stories ====
- "Go Together" (December 15, 2020 – February 10, 2021), a two-part story written by Charles Soule, and published in Star Wars Insider #199 and #200 from Titan Magazines. The first part acts as a prologue to Soule's novel Light of the Jedi, and the second part as an epilogue.
- "First Duty" (March 17, 2021 — April 27, 2021), a two-part story written by Cavan Scott, and published in Star Wars Insider #201 and #202. The story features the character Velko, the first aid to the head of Starlight Beacon, meant to act as a view into the High Republic outside of the Jedi.
- "Hidden Danger" (June 8, 2021 – August 10, 2021), a two-part story written by Justina Ireland, and published in Star Wars Insider #203 and #204. The story features the Agrarian and Agricultural Alliance meeting at Starlight Beacon ahead of the upcoming Republic Fair, before being attacked by the Drengir.
- "Past Mistakes" (September 21, 2021 – November 2, 2021), a two-part story written by Cavan Scott, and published in Star Wars Insider #205 and #206.
- "Shadows Remain" (December 14, 2021 – January 25, 2022), a two-part story written by Justina Ireland, and published in Star Wars Insider #207 and #208.

==== Novels ====
- Light of the Jedi (January 5, 2021) by Charles Soule, published by Del Rey. The novel features the Great Disaster, the inciting incident of the event, when a ship was destroyed while in hyperspace, resulting in pieces of it threatening to destroy an entire system.
- The Rising Storm (June 29, 2021) by Cavan Scott, published by Del Rey. The novel features the Republic Fair, a gathering to celebrate the great things and new inventions of the Republic, and involves the Jedi Stellan Gios as well as a monster hunter named Ty Yorrick.
- The Fallen Star (January 4, 2022) by Claudia Gray, published by Del Rey. In this book, the Nihil deal a costly blow to both The Jedi and The Republic by executing a plan to sabotage Starlight Beacon itself.

===== Young adult novels =====
- Into the Dark (February 2, 2021) by Claudia Gray, published by Disney–Lucasfilm Press. The novel features Padawan Reath Silas, whose ship is knocked out of hyperspace, forcing him and several other Jedi to take refuge on an abandoned space station overrun with plant life.
- Out of the Shadows (July 27, 2021) by Justina Ireland, published by Disney–Lucasfilm Press. It continues the story of Vernestra Rwoh from A Test of Courage and Reath Silas from Into the Dark.
- Midnight Horizon (February 1, 2022) by Daniel José Older, published by Disney–Lucasfilm Press.

===== Middle-grade novels =====
- A Test of Courage (January 5, 2021) by Justina Ireland, published by Disney–Lucasfilm Press. The novel shows young Jedi Vernestra Rwoh and Imri Cantaros, as well as several children, aboard a ship bombed by the Nihil, forcing them to survive on a hostile jungle moon.
- Race to Crashpoint Tower (June 29, 2021) by Daniel José Older, published by Disney–Lucasfilm Press. Taking place at the same time as The Rising Storm, it features Padawans Ram Jomaram, a gifted mechanic from a small planet getting his first glimpse at the larger galaxy through the Republic Fair, and Lula Talisola from The High Republic Adventures.
- Mission to Disaster (2022) by Justina Ireland, published by Disney–Lucasfilm Press.

===== Young reader books =====
- The Great Jedi Rescue (January 5, 2021) by Cavan Scott, published by Disney–Lucasfilm Press. It serves as a young reader adaptation of Light of the Jedi by Charles Soule.
- Showdown at the Fair (October 5, 2021) by George Mann, published by Disney–Lucasfilm Press. It serves as a young reader adaptation of The Rising Storm by Cavan Scott.

==== Comics ====
- Star Wars: The High Republic, a comic book by Cavan Scott with art by Ario Anindito, published by Marvel Comics. The series premiered on January 6, 2021, beginning with the 5-issue arc "There is No Fear", taking place directly after the novel Light of the Jedi and featuring young Padawan Keeve Trennis. A second story arc began with the sixth issue of the series on June 2, 2021.
- Star Wars: The High Republic Adventures, an ongoing comic book by Daniel José Older with art by Harvey Tolibao, published by IDW Comics. It features the character Yoda, on sabbatical from the Jedi Council, mentoring a group of young Padawans. The first arc started on February 3, 2021, and ran for five issues, and the second began with the sixth issue on July 7, 2021.
- The Edge of Balance, an original manga by Justina Ireland and Shima Shinya with art by Mizuki Sakakibara, published by Viz Media. It focuses on Jedi posted on smaller planets, emphasizing on their role as a protector of the people, and features Jedi Lily Tora-Asi and Arkoff, as well as Stellan Gios, who appears in several stories in the event, combating the attacking Drengir. The first volume was released on September 7, 2021.
- Star Wars: The High Republic Adventures — The Monster of Temple Peak, a four-issue comic book series by Cavan Scott with art by Rachel Stott, published by IDW. The series expands on Ty Yorrick, a character introduced in The Rising Storm, and debuted in August 2021. The Monster of Temple Peak was originally announced as a graphic novel, before being reformatted into a limited series.
- Trail of Shadows, a comic book mini-series by Daniel José Older with art by David Wachter, published by Marvel Comics. The series follows the events of The Rising Storm, and features Jedi Emerick Caphtor on a mission from the Jedi Order and private detective Sian Holt on a mission from Chancellor Lina Soh, both investigating "shocking events at the Republic Fair".
- Star Wars: The High Republic: Eye of the Storm, a comic book mini-series by Charles Soule with art by Guillermo Sanna, published by Marvel Comics. It focuses on the origins of the Nihil and its leader Marchion Ro, and serves as the end of Phase 1. It began publication on January 12, 2022, and concluded on March 02, 2022.

==== Reference books ====
- The Art of Star Wars: The High Republic (Phase One) (October 18, 2022) by Kristin Baver, published by Abrams Books.
- Star Wars: The High Republic: An Illustrated Archive (November 29, 2022) by Cole Horton, published by Insight Editions.

==== Audio ====
- Tempest Runner (August 31, 2021), an audio drama by Cavan Scott, published by Penguin Random House Audio. The story focuses on the character of Lourna Dee from Light of the Jedi, one of the three "Tempest Runners" who hold the second highest position of power in the Nihil.

==== Web series ====
- Characters of Star Wars: The High Republic, a series of animated shorts that tells the stories of The High Republic's heroes and villains. The first short, highlighting A Test of Courage character Vernestra Rwoh, released on January 19, 2021, on the official Star Wars YouTube channel and website.
- Star Wars: The High Republic Show, a behind-the-scenes web series hosted by Krystina Arielle on the official Star Wars YouTube channel and website. The series releases on a bi-monthly basis, and features guests from the initiative discussing the works and what went into making them. The first episode premiered on January 27, 2021.

=== Phase II — Quest of the Jedi ===
Phase II takes place during an Age of Exploration, 150 years prior to the events of Light of the Jedi.

==== Short stories ====
While the short stories in Phase I were written by a variety of authors, Phase II's short stories were all written by George Mann under the title "Tales of Enlightenment" (Mann has also authored a Phase II middle-grade novel Quest for the Hidden City, and the audio drama "The Battle of Jedha"). Published in Star Wars Insider, the stories are all centered in and around Enlightenment, a Jedha bar.

- "New Prospects" (September 13, 2022 - October 25, 2022), a two-part story published in Star Wars Insider #213 and #214.
- "A Different Perspective" (December 6, 2022), published in Star Wars Insider #215.
- "The Unusual Suspect" (February 7, 2023), published in Star Wars Insider #216.
- "No Such Thing as a Bad Customer" (March 14, 2023 - May 2, 2023), a two-part story published in Star Wars Insider #217 and #218.
- "Last Orders" (June 13, 2023), published in Star Wars Insider #219.

A sixth short story, "Missing Pieces" is to be published in March 2024 as part of a collected edition of all the "Tales of Enlightenment" stories, by Titan Comics.

==== Novels ====
- Convergence (November 22, 2022) by Zoraida Córdova, published by Del Rey. Set on the warring twin planets of Eiram and E’ronoh, the Republic—ruled at this time by two chancellors—attempts to broker peace via a marriage of state between Princess Xiri A’lbaran of E’ronoh and Prince Phan-tu Zenn of Eiram, while mysterious forces attempt to escalate the conflict.
- Cataclysm (April 4, 2023) by Lydia Kang, published by Del Rey. Following the events of The Battle of Jedha, the novel follows the efforts of the Jedi and Republic to re-establish peace between Eiram and E’ronoh, and investigate the Path of the Open Hand's involvement in the attack on Jedha's holy city.

===== Young adult novels =====
- Path of Deceit (October 4, 2022) by Tessa Gratton and Justina Ireland, published by Disney–Lucasfilm Press. Cousins Marda and Yana Ro (ancestors of Nihil leader Marchion Ro) are members of The Path of the Open Hand, a secretive religious order located on the planet Dalna and controlled by a charismatic leader called The Mother, who believe that the Jedi's manipulation of the Force disrupts the balance of the universe. When Jedi arrive to investigate the theft and sale of Force-related artifacts, the sisters’ loyalties are tested.
- Path of Vengeance (May 2, 2023) by Cavan Scott, published by Disney–Lucasfilm Press. Running parallel to the events of Cataclysm, the novel describes Marda's increasingly fanatic dedication to the cause of the Path, Yana's continued travels, and the Jedi confrontation with the Path on Dalna as the depth of their conspiracy is revealed. At New York Comic Con 2022 it was announced that nine unique authors would produce a High Republic YA Anthology. The novel included every previous High Republic author.

===== Middle-grade novels =====
- Quest for the Hidden City (November 1, 2022) by George Mann, published by Disney–Lucasfilm Press.
- Quest for Planet X (es) (April 4, 2023) by Tessa Gratton, published by Disney–Lucasfilm Press.

==== Comics ====
- Star Wars: The High Republic, an ongoing comic book by Cavan Scott with art by Ario Anindito, published by Marvel Comics. It premiered in October 2022.
- The Blade, a comic book by Charles Soule with art by Marco Castiello, published by Marvel Comics. It premiered in November 2022.
- The Edge of Balance: Precedent, an original manga by Daniel José Older with art by Tomio Ogata, published by Viz Media. A flashback following The Edge of Balance, it focuses on the Wookie Jedi Arkoff during the Battle of Dalna, and also features the Jedi Aslin Rell's fall to madness.

==== Audio ====
- The Battle of Jedha (February 14, 2023), an audio drama by George Mann, published by Penguin Random House Audio. Seeking to permanently disrupt the peace between Eiram and E’ronoh, the Path of the Open Hand conspires to attack a treaty signing in Jedha.

=== Phase III — Trials of the Jedi ===
The events of Phase III follow the events of The Fallen Star, returning to the timeline established in Phase I.

==== Novels ====
- The Eye of Darkness (November 14, 2023) by George Mann, published by Random House Worlds. The novel details the establishment of ‘Nihil space’ a fiefdom controlled by the Nihil and cut off from the rest of the galaxy through a mysteriously controlled communication and transit barrier called the Stormwall. Trapped behind the Stormwall, Jedi masters Porter Engle and Avar Kriss are hunted by the Nihil, while their friends in the Republic attempt to breach the Stormwall.
- Temptation of the Force (June 11, 2024) by Tessa Gratton, published by Random House Worlds. This book continues the story of Avar Kriss and Elzar Mann, and also features Jedi Knight Vernestra Rwoh from previous Young Adult novels. With the Jedi pushing back against the Nihil and their Stormwall, Marchion Ro retreats to obscurity and discovers a new weapon to use against them.
- Trials of the Jedi (June 17, 2025) by Charles Soule, published by Random House Worlds.

==== Young adult novels ====
- Defy the Storm (March 5, 2024) by Tessa Gratton and Justina Ireland, published by Disney–Lucasfilm Press.
- Tears of the Nameless (September 24, 2024) by George Mann, published by Disney–Lucasfilm Press.
- Into the Light (Spring 2025) by Claudia Gray, published by Disney–Lucasfilm Press.

==== Middle-grade novels ====
- Escape from Valo (es) (January 30, 2024) by Daniel José Older and Alyssa Wong, published by Disney–Lucasfilm Press.
- Beware the Nameless (August 27, 2024) by Zoraida Córdova, published by Disney–Lucasfilm Press.
- A Valiant Vow (Spring 2025) by Justina Ireland, published by Disney–Lucasfilm Press.

==== Comics ====
- Star Wars: The High Republic, an ongoing comic book by Cavan Scott with art by Ario Anindito and Jim Towe, published by Marvel Comics. It premiered in November 2023, and follows Keeve Trennis' new life as a Jedi Master while she hunts for the former Nihil commander Lourna Dee.
- Star Wars: The High Republic: Shadows of Starlight, a four-issue miniseries, written by Charles Soule and illustrated by Ibraim Roberson, detailing the Jedi response to the shocking Nihil attack on Starlight Beacon.

==== Audio ====
- Tempest Breaker (December 3, 2024), an audio drama by Cavan Scott, published by Penguin Random House Audio.

=== Related works ===
- Temple of Darkness, an expansion for the virtual reality game Star Wars: Tales from the Galaxy's Edge that takes place during the High Republic, developed by ILMxLab. The game features Jedi Padawan Ady Sun’Zee, the sole survivor of an encounter with an evil relic on Batuu, who works with Yoda to confront it.
- Star Wars: The Vow of Silver Dawn, a Chinese language eBook written by an author by the pen name "His Majesty the King". The Vow of Silver Dawn was created in collaboration between Lucasfilm and Tencent in an effort to create an interest in Star Wars among a Chinese audience, and was released chapter-by-chapter. The eBook takes place near the end of the High Republic era and features a young Jedi named Sean with a secret past, patrolling the Outer Rim. Lucasfilm has stated there are no plans for an English translation and release. Initially said to be set 50 years before The Phantom Menace, Star Wars: Timelines places it 168 years before said film.
- Star Wars: Young Jedi Adventures, an animated series for Disney+ and Disney Jr. that follows a group of younglings as they learn to become Jedi Knights during the High Republic era. It is the first full-length animated Star Wars series targeted at young audiences.
- The Acolyte, a Disney+ original series written by Leslye Headland, who also acts as showrunner. In April 2020, Variety reported that a female-centric live-action Star Wars streaming television series was in development for Disney+ with Russian Doll co-creator Leslye Headland serving as a writer and showrunner. In early November, Headland expounded that the series would be set "in a pocket of the universe and a pocket of the timeline that we don't know much about," elaborating that she was more engaged creatively with the geography of the Star Wars universe than its existing visuals. On November 5, Deadline reported that the series was expected to be an "action thriller with martial arts elements". On Disney Investor Day 2020, it was revealed that the series is "mystery-thriller" featuring "emerging dark side powers in the final days of the High Republic era."
- The video game Star Wars Eclipse, revealed in December 2021, will be set in the High Republic era. It is in development by Quantic Dream.

== Reception ==
In the first week of its release, the event's debut novel Light of the Jedi was the #2 best selling novel on Amazon, and #1 on The New York Times Best Seller list of hardcover fiction, staying on the list for four weeks. A Test of Courage, which released on the same day, debuted at #2 on The New York Times list for children's middle grade hardcover books, staying on the list for two weeks. The third novel, Into the Dark, gained similar success by debuting on #1 on the list for young adult hardcover novels.

The first two issues of Marvel's The High Republic comic book series were the best-selling digital comics on Comixology during the week of their release. The first issue sold over 200,000 physical pre-orders to comic book shops, prompting Marvel to create a second printing of the issue before its official release, as well as third and fourth printings shortly after. The hall for The High Republic panel at Star Wars Celebration 2022 was filled far beyond the attending authors' dreams for the event, much to their delight; as Charles Soule told Star Wars Insider, the hall was filled to capacity as "Something like 4,000 people had come to see us talk about and celebrate The High Republic." Soule also celebrated "a cosplay meetup shortly after that, which ended up being attended by dozens and dozens of people who had made elaborate, beautiful High Republic costumes." Soule was very thankful for the moment, as he reflected "It felt like we had done something that connected with people."
