= Star Wars: The Fallen Star =

2022 science fiction novel by Claudia Gray

Star Wars: The High Republic: The Fallen Star
- Author: Claudia Gray
- Audio read by: Marc Thompson
- Language: English
- Genre: Science fiction
- Publisher: Del Rey
- Publication date: January 4, 2022
- Publication place: United States
- Media type: Print (hardcover, e-book, audiobook
- Pages: 352
- ISBN: 978-0593355398
- Preceded by: Star Wars: The Rising Storm

Star Wars: The High Republic: The Fallen Star is a novel written by Claudia Gray and is the final adult novel in the Star Wars: The High Republic franchise's first phase, Light of the Jedi. It is a direct sequel to Light of the Jedi and The Rising Storm taking place 200 years before Star Wars: The Phantom Menace. It follows the continued conflict between the Jedi Order and the Nihil.

== Premise ==
The Jedi deal with the aftermath of tragedy and a widespread attack on the Republic Fair, dubbed the "conflagrine on the flames" by the "space Vikings" known as the Nihil. As Knights and Padawans stationed on Starlight Beacon recuperate from injuries and emotional trauma, Marchion Ro prepares his deadliest attack on the Order.

== Marketing ==
The novel's title was revealed at San Diego Comic-Con in July 2021 along with three other novels in the third wave of Light of the Jedi. The tagline associated with the third wave was "The Light of the Jedi goes dark", hinting at the increasingly grim direction the novel is set to take the franchise towards.

The first issue of a comic book, Star Wars: Halcyon Legacy (2022), features prominently a character from The Fallen Star, Nib Assek.

== Reception ==
CNET said that "The Fallen Star is the most engrossing Star Wars novel in years [...]" /Film wrote: "The book is equal parts fun and tense, reading very much like a disaster escape movie from the '70s [...]" Both reviewers compared the novel to the 1980 film The Empire Strikes Back.

According to the publisher, the book is on The New York Times Best Seller list.
