= Star Wars: The Rising Storm =

2021 science fiction novel by Cavan Scott

Star Wars: The High Republic: The Rising Storm
- Author: Cavan Scott
- Audio read by: Marc Thompson
- Language: English
- Genre: Science fiction
- Publisher: Del Rey
- Publication date: June 29, 2021
- Publication place: United States
- Media type: Print (hardcover, e-book, audiobook
- Pages: 448
- ISBN: 978-0593159415
- Preceded by: Star Wars: Light of the Jedi
- Followed by: Star Wars: The Fallen Star

Star Wars: The High Republic: The Rising Storm is a novel written by Cavan Scott in the Star Wars: The High Republic multi-media franchise and a sequel to Light of the Jedi. Taking place approximately 200 years before the events of Star Wars: The Phantom Menace, The Rising Storm builds on previous High Republic novels and comics centering on the war between the Jedi Order and the Nihil. It was released by Del Rey on June 29, 2021.

A direct sequel, The Fallen Star, was released on January 4, 2022.

== Plot ==
The story takes place one year after Light of the Jedi. Elzar Mann, still haunted by visions of death and carnage, is assigned to the Jedi outpost Valo to oversee the Republic Fair, a demonstration of unity between various planets orchestrated by Chancellor Lina Soh.

Bell Zettifar, now apprenticed to Indeera Stokes, mourns his previous master, Loden Greatstorm, who he believes to be dead, and represses his force instincts so that he cannot find out the truth. Marchion Ro ventures to the Rystan Badlands and frees an ancient creature called the Great Leveler, who he believes will bring about the Jedi's doom. Jedi Knight Stellan Gios travels with Soh to Valo to hold a broadcast by Rhil Dairo. Ty Yorrick, a monster hunter and former Jedi Padawan, is assigned to journey to Valo with a client who is carrying a mysterious weapon.

Elzar believes he has prevented his visions from coming to fruition after the Fair seems to go well and has a one-night stand with the Valon in charge of the Fair, Samera Ra-oon in order to repress his feelings of rejection from Avar Kriss. The Jedi discover and arrest Ty and her buyer after seeing them test out machinery that can shut down electronics, including a lightsaber blade. After the Fair's main event, a Nihil fleet arrives on Valo using the Paths and bombards the planet, killing many spectators and some Jedi.

Soh falls into a coma after falling prey to an orbital explosion, while Stellan and the other Jedi stationed on Valo fight off the intruders. Ty and Elzar form a Force dyad which allows them to tame dragon-like beasts and hamper the Nihil's efforts from the sky, though Elzar is forced to touch on the dark side of the force at one critical point in the battle. Dairo records the events and broadcasts it live to the galaxy. After fleeing Valo when forces from outside respond to Dairo's beacon, Tempest Runners Lourna Dee and Pan Eyta organize a revolt against Marchion, but Lourna double-crosses Pan and leaves him for dead.

Bell is unable to save the Innovator, a vessel that was the centerpiece of the Fair, but discovers that Loden is still alive. The Jedi deduce the location of the Nihil's main base on Grizal and arrive to ambush the marauders. Marchion and the Nihil escape on the Gaze Electric, while Lourna is captured by the Jedi. The Leveler is released and petrifies Loden. Stellan touches Loden's cheek and Loden turns to dust; Stellan remarks that this was the first time he ever felt fear since he was a child.

== Reception ==
Writing for the FanSided website Dork Side of the Force, Tom Farr lauded the novel for as "the best kind of Star Wars book [that is] emotional... [has] rising stakes... and deepens the Jedi mythology," calling it a "classic page-turner." Megan Crouse for the Den of Geek said the book is boring and the overall execution is uneven. /Film wrote: "There are elements that feel like The Poseidon Adventure mixed with the pulp adventure Star Wars is known for, leaving you with a breathtaking feeling once the action kicks off."

According to the publisher, the book is on The New York Times Best Seller list.
