= Transformers/Back to the Future =

Crossover comic miniseries

- Cover A for issue #1 by Juan Samu.

Publication information
- Publisher: IDW Publishing
- Format: Limited series
- Genre: Crossover; Science fiction
- Publication date: October 7, 2020 — May 12, 2021
- No. of issues: 4
- Main character(s): Transformers (Hasbro); Back to the Future (Universal Pictures)

Creative team
- Written by: Cavan Scott
- Penciller: Juan Samu
- Letterer: Neil Uyetake
- Colorist: David García Cruz
- Editor(s): David Marriotte; Chase Marotz

Transformers/Back to the Future is a four-issue crossover comic miniseries from IDW Publishing that debuted in October 2020. The series is a crossover event to celebrate the 35th anniversary of the Transformers franchise by Hasbro and the Back to the Future films by Universal Pictures.

== Plot ==
Following the events of the first film, Marty McFly finally returns home to Hill Valley in 1985, while Doc Brown departs for 2015 in the DeLorean time machine. Meanwhile, the Autobots and Decepticons scuffle for the time machine. Marty unexpectedly wakes up in a dystopic present when the Decepticons killed most of the Autobots and successfully conquered Earth, with Megatron having Biff Tannen as his second in command. Luckily, a time-traveling Cybertronian named Gigawatt locates Marty for help.

After a tough and confusing encounter with Starscream, Marty decides to trust Gigawatt, who is joined by Skilz, another Cybertronian disguised as Marty's skateboard. The group meets the surviving Autobots led by Rodimus Prime, who reveals that Doc was unintentionally responsible for the chain of events: when he traveled forward to the year 2015, he met Decepticon Rumble, who survived his encounter in 1985. Doc befriended Rumble, unaware of the latter's agenda. When the DeLorean was completely repaired, Rumble used it to travel back to 1974, using Biff to develop Energon supplies for Megatron's arrival. Gigawatt then reveals he used to be a Decepticon, but after having enough with Megatron abusing and murdering other human workers, he trans-scanned the DeLorean and escaped, but his flux capacitor was damaged in the process and in order to fix it, they need Doc, who is somewhere forming his own resistance.

Back on Hill Valley, Doc manages to save Biff and Marty's parents from the Constructicons, planning to reunite the last standing Autobots, but Biff double-crosses them and attempts to execute them. Marty and the Autobots arrive in time to save them, defeating all the Decepticons. However, they are confronted by a giant Decepticon disguised as Hill Valley's courthouse named Watchtower.

While battling Watchtower, Doc fixes Gigawatt's flux capacitor, and with Skilz, they both help Marty and Gigawatt enough speed to travel back to 1984, preventing Rumble from awakening Megatron. However, Gigawatt gets critically injured from his previous battle. Marty uses the original time machine to go back to 2015, where Doc and Biff repaired Gigawatt and the Autobots are still protecting Earth and humanity. After returning to 1985, Marty gets a new pickup truck from his parents, unaware it is a Decepticon in disguise.

== Publication history ==
=== Comic book ===
The Transformers/Back to the Future series is written by Cavan Scott, and illustrated by Juan Samu, as part of the 35th anniversary of Hasbro's Transformers and Universal Pictures' Back to the Future.

=== Toy ===
As part of the Transformers Collaborative toy line, Hasbro released a toy figure based on the original character Gigawatt, which is based on the DeLorean time machine.

== Characters ==
Transformers characters	Back to the Future characters	Original characters
Blitzwing; Bonecrusher; Bumblebee; Hound; Jazz; Long Haul; Megatron; Mixmaster; Optimus Prime; Ravage; Rumble; Scavenger; Scrapper; Soundwave; Starscream; Thundercracker	Marty McFly; Emmett "Doc" Brown; George McFly; Lorraine Baines; Biff Tannen; Dave McFly; Linda McFly; Einstein	Gigawatt; Skilz; Watchtower

== Issues ==
Issue #	Written by	Drawn by	Coloured by	Lettered by	Publication date
1	Cavan Scott	Juan Samu	David García Cruz	Neil Uyetake	October 7, 2020
2	Cavan Scott	Juan Samu	David García Cruz	Neil Uyetake	December 23, 2020
3	Cavan Scott	Juan Samu	David García Cruz	Neil Uyetake	March 17, 2021
4	Cavan Scott	Juan Samu	David García Cruz	Neil Uyetake	May 12, 2021

== Reception ==
Issue #	Publication date	Critic rating	Critic reviews	Ref.
1	October 7, 2020	8.7/10	8	
2	December 23, 2020	6.0/10	1	
3	March 17, 2021	8.0/10	3	
4	May 12, 2021	8.4/10	2	
Overall	—N/a	7.8/10	14	

== Collected editions ==
Title	Material collected	Publication date	ISBN
Transformers/Back to the Future	Transformers/Back to the Future #1−4; Bonus material	September 7, 2021	1684058015, 978-1684058013
