= Ario Anindito =

Indonesian comic book writer, illustrator, inker, and art director

- Born: Ario Anindito; September 30, 1984 (age 42) Bandung, West Java, Indonesia
- Areas: Writer, Penciller, Inker, Colourist
- Notable works: Red Hood and the Outlaws; Star Wars: The High Republic

Ario Anindito is an Indonesian comic book writer, illustrator, inker, and art director who has contributed to DC Comics and Marvel Comics.

His best-known contributions are as an illustrator and inker for the Star Wars: The High Republic comic series.

== Early life ==
Ario Anindito was born in Bandung on September 30, 1984. His parents were inspired to name him after the stories of Satria Pinandita, which combines the words ksatria (knight) and pandita (priest), meaning to have the courage of a knight and the wisdom of a priest.

Anindito has been an avid comic book reader and admirer since the age of six. In 2002, he began studying architecture at Universitas Katolik Parahyangan in Bandung. His passion for comic books was evident in his final exam, which focused on the design of a comic book museum.

== Career ==
After graduating from university in 2007, Ario Anindito did not pursue a career in architecture. Instead, he followed his dream of becoming a comic book artist.

He started working as a freelance illustrator, publishing his works on various art websites. In 2008, he published his first comic book, Nadya and the Painkillers, through a compilation magazine by the indie publisher Sparx the Compendium.

In 2009, he was hired as a concept artist for the Indonesian movie Drupadi, based on the Mahabharata folklore and produced by Sinemart, an Indonesian film production house.

In 2010, he became a freelance art director at DraftFCB Indonesia, where he directed several Indonesian television commercials. One of his commercials earned him the Gold Award in the animation category at the Citra Pariwara 2011 event.

In 2012, he was hired as an art director for the Indonesian comedy-drama movie Finding Srimulat. His work on this film earned him a nomination for Best Art Director at the 2012 Piala Maya awards.

=== DC Comics ===
In 2010, he was approached by the Italian talent scout agency Tomato, which later became his manager. Tomato expressed interest in Ario's work and, in 2012, gave him the opportunity to join DC Comics projects as the illustrator for the Red Hood and the Outlaws comic book series.

=== Marvel Comics ===
After working for DC Comics for two years, Ario Anindito's contributions caught the attention of Marvel Comics, which invited him to join through a selective recruitment process. In 2014, he moved to Marvel Comics as a penciller, where his role involved translating scripts into visual comic book panels.

Some of his notable Marvel Comics works as an illustrator and inker include “Wolverines,” “Secret Wars: House of M,” “Agents of S.H.I.E.L.D.,” “Venom,” “X-Men: Extermination,” and “Secret Empire: United.”

His most prominent work is the “Star Wars: The High Republic” series. As a co-creator and illustrator, alongside Cavan Scott, Anindito contributed significantly to the series. The series has been noted as one of the best-selling comic book series, with the first edition selling 200,000 copies.

=== Collectibles ===
He also joined XM Studios, a high-end collectibles company based in Singapore, where he designs collectible statue figures for characters from both DC Comics and Marvel Comics.

One of his notable works with XM Studios is the collectible statue of Batman, known as the Batman Rebirth Statue. This achievement marked Ario as the first Indonesian artist to design an officially licensed Batman statue from DC Comics for international marketing.

=== Other works ===
He has also worked on several concepts for television commercials for both local Indonesian brands and international brands through Dentsu Indonesia and Drawing Squad advertising agency. Additionally, he works as a novel and book illustrator for Kepustakaan Populer Gramedia and as a book and magazine illustrator for various other publishing companies.

== Notable works ==
- Agents of S.H.I.E.L.D.
- Annihilation 2099
- Atlantis Attacks Vol 11
- Atlantis Attacks Vol 15
- Buffy the Last Vampire Slayer
- Dead Seas
- El Viejo Logan
- Eve
- EVE: Children of the Moon
- Extermation
- House of M
- Hulkverines!
- Inhumanos
- Invincible Iron Man Vol 5 6
- Magic: The Hidden Planeswalker
- Miles Morales: Spider-Man
- Moon Knight: City of the Dead Vol 13
- Red Hood and the Outlaws
- Star Wars
- Star Wars: Crimson Reign Vol 11
- Star Wars: Crimson Reign Vol 12
- Star Wars: Crimson Reign Vol 15
- Star Wars: Obi-Wan Kenobi Vol 11
- Star Wars: The High Republic Vol 11
- Star Wars: The High Republic Vol 12
- Star Wars: The High Republic Vol 13
- Star Wars: The High Republic Vol 18
- Star Wars: The High Republic Vol 21
- Star Wars: The High Republic Vol 22
- Star Wars: The High Republic Vol 23
- Star Wars: The High Republic Vol 24
- Star Wars: The High Republic - Trail of Shadows Vol 11
- Star Wars: The High Republic Phase II
- Star Wars Reprint
- Star Wars Sonderband
- Sword Master
- The Vampire Slayer
- Uncanny Inhumans
- Venom
- Weapon H
- Wolverines
- X-Men Vol 6 22
- X-Men Vol 6 32

== Filmography ==
=== Film ===
Year	Title	Role	Notes	Ref.
2012	Finding Srimulat		Art director	

== Awards ==
Year	Award	Category	Nominated works	Result
2011	Citra Pariwara	Gold Award for Animation	L.A. Lights “Goat” commercial	Win
2013	Maya Awards	Best Art Direction	Finding Srimulat	Nominated

== Personal ventures ==
He owns a small art studio in his hometown of Bandung, which he calls "Stonefruit Studio." The name is inspired by the neighborhood where he grew up, known in Indonesian as "Buah Batu," which literally translates to "Stone Fruit" in English.
