= Blindspot (comics) =

Blindspot is the name of several characters appearing in American comic books published by Marvel Comics.

== Publication history ==
The first Blindspot originated from Marvel's New Universe imprint in DP 7 #14 (Dec. 1987) and was created by Mark Gruenwald and Paul Ryan.

The second Blindspot was a minor character named Kylie Kopelkin who appeared in The Punisher (vol. 3) #15 (Jan. 1997) and was created by John Ostrander and Tom Lyle.

The third Blindspot is an unnamed Japanese mutant who was a member of the Brotherhood of Mutants. She first appeared in Rogue (vol. 3) #7 (March 2005) and was created by Tony Bedard and Karl Moline.

The fourth Blindspot, and only male, is a supporting character of Daredevil named Samuel "Sam" Chung. He first appeared in All-New, All-Different Marvel Point One #1 (December 2015) and was created by Charles Soule and Ron Garney.

== Fictional character biography ==
=== Mutant ===
Blindspot

Publication information
- Publisher: Marvel Comics
- First appearance: Rogue vol. 3 #7 (March 2005)
- Created by: Tony Bedard; Karl Moline

In-story information
- Team affiliations: Brotherhood of Mutants
- Partnerships: Silver Samurai; Lady Deathstrike; Rogue
- Notable aliases: Memory Thief
- Abilities: Memory manipulation

Blindspot joined the Brotherhood of Mutants at the behest of Mystique. She befriended teammate Rogue and they shared a sisterly bond bordering on romantic. They were hired by Tomo Yoshida to steal a hard drive for him along with his nephew Sunfire from Lord Dark Wind. After several missions, Blindspot opted to leave, but not without wiping herself out of Mystique and Rogue's memories. She spared Destiny who wished her luck. Years later, she heard a rumor that Dark Wind was seeking revenge, which scared her as Mystique and Rogue did not remember. Lady Deathstrike was revealed to be behind it and kidnapped Blindspot.

Silver Samurai confronts Blindspot, who reveals that she had erased his memories of working with the X-Men. Soon afterward, Blindspot sends Silver Samurai after Rogue and Sunfire. Rogue absorbs Sunfire's powers to use against Deathstrike and Blindspot takes Rogue's memories of her time in the X-Men. Blindspot attempts to convince Rogue that the X-Men are her enemies, but Rogue sees through the contradictions in her remaining memories and figures out that Blindspot had deceived her. Rogue leaves to reunite with the X-Men.

=== Samuel Chung ===
Blindspot

Publication information
- Publisher: Marvel Comics
- First appearance: All-New, All-Different Marvel Point One #1 (Dec. 2015)
- Created by: Charles Soule; Ron Garney

In-story information
- Alter ego: Samuel Chung
- Notable aliases: Ghost Brother; Daredevil
- Abilities: Martial arts Acrobatics

Sam Chung is an expertly trained gymnast from China. His mother, Lu Wei, immigrated to the United States to have a better life. Sometime later, Lu gave birth to a daughter, Hannah, who due to being born on U.S. soil became a legal citizen. Years later, Sam began working as a janitor at Columbia University, where he created an invisibility suit for himself. Going by the name Blindspot, Sam decides to become a vigilante.

Sam attempts to take down Muse, who gouges out his eyes. Lu Wei restores Sam's eyesight, but converts him to the Hand while attempting to make a deal with Krahllak. Sam lures Daredevil into a trap, learning his secret identity as Matt Murdock. Eventually, Sam returns to Daredevil's side, resulting in his mother sacrificing herself for her son and he and Daredevil returning to the United States.

Krahllak attacks New York City and offers to surrender if Sam hands himself over, which he agrees to. When the Hand attacks Sam and Daredevil, they are saved by Moon Knight, Spider-Man, Jessica Jones, Luke Cage, and the Ordo Draconum (Order of the Dragon). Daredevil defeats Krahllak, with Sam being considered as a recruit for the Ordo Draconum.

== Powers and abilities ==
The mutant version of Blindspot has the ability to absorb and give memories to people, but they have to be existing memories. She can only affect organic beings as she was incapable of affecting Deathstrike due to her cybernetic parts. She is also immune to Rogue's absorbing powers.

Sam Chung is an expert martial artist due to his intense training which was greatly enhanced with his training from the Hand. He is also a skilled acrobat from a young age. He also seems to possess high intelligence, as he created the invisibility suit himself.

== Other characters named Blindspot ==
Two unrelated characters have used the name Blindspot:

- Kylie Kopelkin is a member of the Mutant Liberation Front who possesses the ability to manipulate light. She is killed by Simon Trask after refusing a direct order from him. The character's real name was revealed in Official Handbook of the Marvel Universe.
- Lionel Berry is a character originating from the New Universe imprint. He is able to become invisible and is part of the Black Powers, a team that combats what they perceive as racism.

== In other media ==
Sam Chung appears in the second season of Iron Fist, portrayed by James C. Chen. This version works at Bayard, a charity drive funded by Sherry Yang and is close friends with Colleen Wing.
