= FARMA =

The National Farmers' Retail & Markets Association
- Company type: Cooperative
- Industry: Local foods
- Predecessor: Farm Retail Association (founded 1979), National Association of Farmers' Markets (founded 1999)
- Founded: 2003 (merger)
- Headquarters: Newmarket, United Kingdom
- Key people: Michael Mack, Managing Agent; Sally Jackson, Chairman
- Products: Communications & promotion, Credit & debit card deal, Sector steering, Farmers' Market Certification, Farm Shop Accreditation, Sector-specific research, Advice, networking & training for members
- Revenue: Not-for-profit
- Website: farma.org.uk

FARMA is a co-operative association of farmers, producers and farmers' market organisations in the United Kingdom.

== Overview ==
FARMA, the National Farmers' Retail and Markets Association is an organisation that was set up to represent farmers and organisations such as farmers markets and farm shops selling their produce directly to consumers. It operates a certification scheme for UK farmers' markets, and its rules have been adopted by many markets and are supported by the Department for the Environment, Food and Rural Affairs (DEFRA).

FARMA is recognised by Cooperatives UK as the federal organisation supporting farmers' markets and local foods in the UK.

== History ==
FARMA came about as a merger in 2003 between the Farm Retail Association (operating since 1979, representing farm shops and pick-your-own farms) and the National Association of Farmers' Markets (operating since 1998). The merger was announced at the Royal Show in Stonleigh Park in July 2004.

== Objectives ==
FARMA define their mission statement as:

- To support the sustainable development of farmers’ markets, farm shops, PYO, box schemes and home delivery
- To sustain and promote high ethical standards for all parts of the industry
- To define and promote the environmental, social and economic values of the industry
- To promote the value of local produce in communities
- To encourage high professional standards and improve management and retailing skills
- To provide a national voice for farmers’ markets, PYO, farm shops, box schemes and home delivery/internet sales
- To act as a conduit for information to, from and within the industry

== Market Certification ==
FARMA certifies farmers' markets in the UK that operate under its guidelines. Markets are independently assessed by a third party and the inspections are carried out on an individual basis. Over 200 farmers' markets in the UK have been Certified by FARMA

Its rules are based around five major principles:

- Food must be produced within a defined local area
- The food must be sold by someone involved in producing it
- Primary produce (things that are sold without significant preparation) must be grown or reared locally
- Secondary produce (value added items, for example pickles or bread) should contain at least one primary product from within the local area, with a recommended minimum of 25% local ingredients.
- Traceability: Information should be available from the market and the traders about how items were produced

Markets can support additional rules, and define their own local area (usually set as a distance or as a County boundary). FARMA recommend a maximum radius of 30 miles, but accept that for large cities a radius of 50 miles is more appropriate.

UK farmers' markets have to abide by regulation from their local authority, and some local authorities have adopted the FARMA guidelines as a requirement.

== See also ==
Farmers' markets
Farm Shop
Local food
Cooperatives UK
