= Charles Soule =

American writer and lawyer

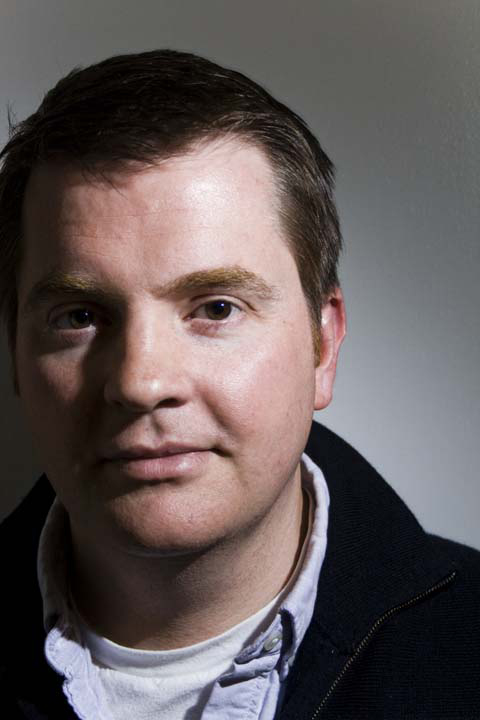
- Soule in April 2012
- Born: Milwaukee, United States
- Education: University of Pennsylvania; Columbia University Law School
- Occupations: Writer, musician, attorney
- Writing career
- Period: 2009–present
- Notable works: Light of the Jedi; Anyone; The Oracle Year; Daredevil; Curse Words; Letter 44; Undiscovered Country; Death of Wolverine; She-Hulk; Darth Vader; Star Wars; Eight Billion Genies
- Website: Official website

Charles Soule is an American comic book writer, novelist, musician, and attorney. He is best known for writing Daredevil, She-Hulk, Death of Wolverine, and various Star Wars books and comic series from Del Rey Books and Marvel Comics, and his creator-owned series Letter 44, Curse Words, and Undiscovered Country, which he co-wrote with Scott Snyder, and as the co-creator of the Marvel Comics and Star Wars characters Ren, Blindspot, Inferno, and Lash. His debut novel, The Oracle Year, was released by Harper Perennial on April 3, 2018. His follow-up novel, Anyone, was released on December 3, 2019, also by Harper Perennial. His third novel, Star Wars: Light of the Jedi, was released by Del Rey Books on January 6, 2021, debuting at #1 on the New York Times bestseller list.

In 2022, he was made a Creative Consultant for Lucasfilm.

== Early life ==
Charles Soule attended the University of Pennsylvania, where he received his undergraduate degree in Asian and Middle Eastern Studies, with a concentration in Chinese language and history. He graduated from Columbia Law School in 2000.

== Career ==
Soule worked in New York City for the firm Ropes & Gray, LLP before starting his own practice in 2004. At his firm, he practiced immigration law, transactional law and corporate law.

In 2009 SLG Publishing published Soule's graphic novel Strongman which focuses on a luchador-turned-hero, with art by Allen Gladfelter. A sequel to Strongman subtitled Oaxaca Tapout was completed in 2011 but remains unreleased. He released two series in 2010 and 2011 through Image Comics, 27: First Set and 27: Second Set, inspired by the well-known urban legends about musicians who die at age twenty-seven, with art by Renzo Podesta. His other creator-owned projects include Strange Attractors, about complexity theory applied to New York City by two genius mathematicians, released by Archaia in May 2013, and Letter 44, from Oni Press, a real-world sci-fi political thriller involving a crewed space mission to investigate an anomaly in the asteroid belt. Letter 44 was a thirty-five issue ongoing series with art from Alberto Jimenez Alburquerque, the first issue of which debuted in October 2013. Letter 44 was optioned for development by the SyFy network in early 2014.

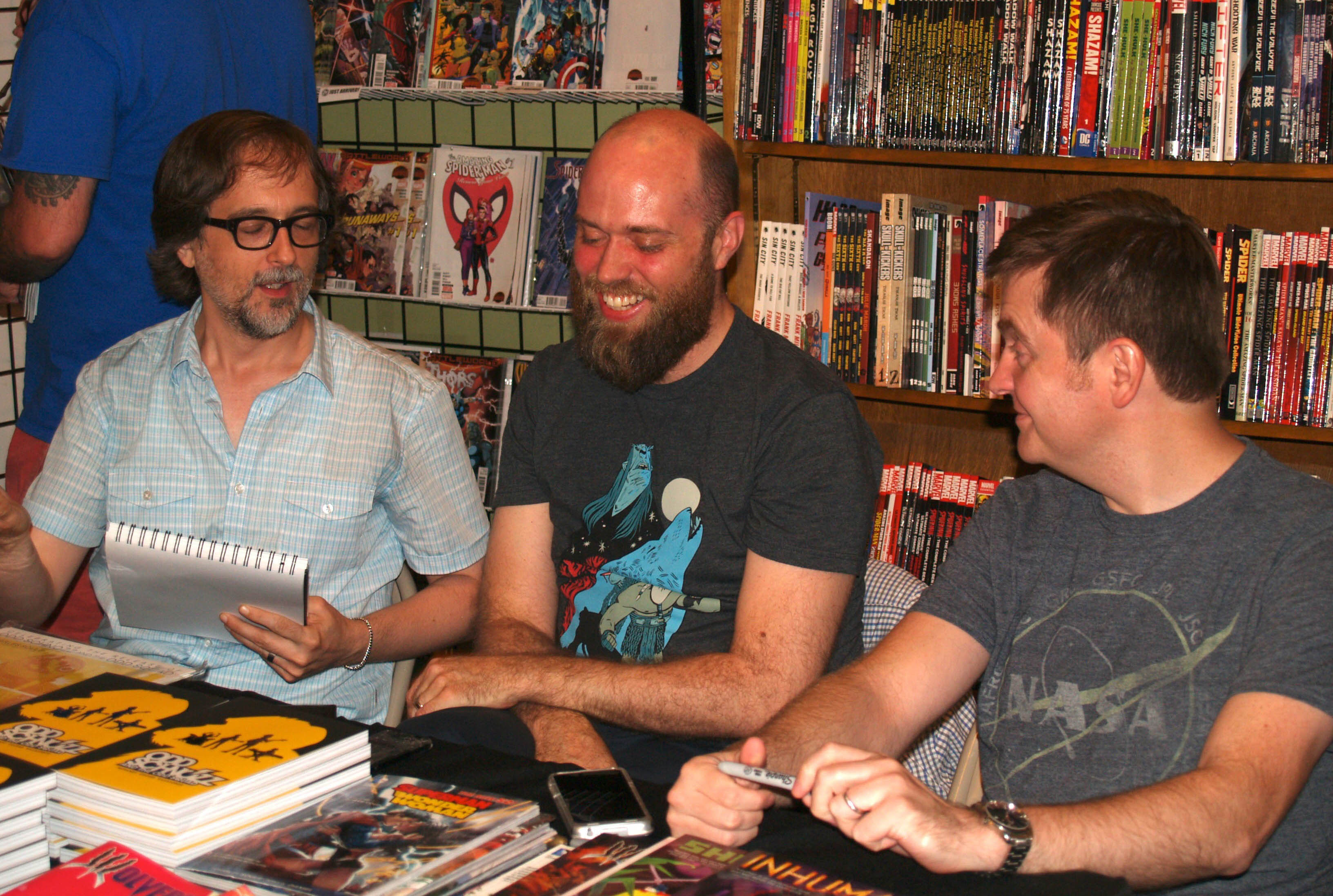
Soule (right) with (from left) fellow writers Joe Infurnari and Jeffrey Burandt at a 2015 signing at JHU Comics in Manhattan

In 2013, Soule took over writing duties for Swamp Thing with issue #19, after Scott Snyder's departure. In addition, he was the writer for Red Lanterns commencing with issue #21 and continuing through issue #37. Starting in October 2013, Soule originated Superman/Wonder Woman, illustrated by Tony Daniel.

Soule was the writer for Marvel Comics' ongoing titles She-Hulk and Inhuman, as well as the writer of The Death of Wolverine published in September 2014. Additional Marvel Comics titles written by Soule include Uncanny Inhumans, Daredevil, Lando, Obi-Wan & Anakin and the "Secret Wars" storyline tie-in book Civil War.

In January 2016, Soule was announced as the writer of a Marvel ongoing series focusing on the Poe Dameron character from Star Wars: The Force Awakens, with Phil Noto as artist.

In January 2017, his ongoing series Curse Words with co-creator Ryan Browne began publication from Image Comics. It completed its 28-issue run in late 2019.

In January 2018 it was reported that Soule would be writing a miniseries titled Hunt for Wolverine, which would span multiple genres in exploring the mystery behind the character's return from the dead in 2017's Marvel Legacy #1.

Soule's debut novel, The Oracle Year, was released on April 3, 2018 from Harper Perennial.

In June 2018, Marvel announced Soule would be writing the series Return of Wolverine, as a follow-up to Death of Wolverine and Hunt For Wolverine. Following Return of Wolverine, Soule relaunched the Marvel Comics: Presents series which featured "Wolverine's Vigil," a story that spanned decades and introduced Wolverine's daughter, Rien.

At San Diego Comic-Con in 2019, Soule and Scott Snyder announced their new creator owned series Undiscovered Country with Image Comics. The series quickly became Image Comics' biggest launch in five years with 83,000 pre-orders. Also at SDCC, Soule also announced that he would be writing a four-issue miniseries Star Wars: The Rise of Kylo Ren which would tell the story of Kylo Ren's fall to the dark side.

Soule was selected alongside many other Star Wars writers to help create Star Wars: The High Republic, a new era of Star Wars novels and comics that take place 200 years before Episode 1.

At New York Comic Con 2019, Soule announced that he would be taking over writing duties on Marvel's Star Wars flagship comic series which would take place between episodes 5 and 6.

In 2020, Soule was hired by Marvel Studios to serve as a legal consultant for the Marvel Cinematic Universe (MCU) television series She-Hulk: Attorney at Law, in order to advise the production on accurate depictions of courtroom activity. The show was released on Disney+ in August 2022.

On April 27, 2022, it was reported that Soule had been made a Creative Consultant for Lucasfilm.

In June 2022, it was announced that Amazon Studios had picked up the rights to make film and television shows based on Eight Billion Genies, with Soule and Ryan Browne set to executive produce.

In October 2024, it was announced that Soule would reunite with Browne for a 9-issue series entitled The Lucky Devils for Image Comics, with the first issue set to debut in January 2025. That same month, at New York Comic Con, it was announced that Soule would work on two new books for Marvel. One would be a three-issue miniseries entitled Daredevil: Cold Day in Hell, reuniting him with artist Steve McNiven and debut in April 2025. The other was an ongoing series entitled Eddie Brock: Carnage with artist Jesus Saiz and to debut on February 12, 2025.

== Awards and recognition ==
In 2020, Soule and his co-creators of the Image Comics series Undiscovered Country were nominated for the Best New Series Eisner Award, recognizing it as one of the finest new series released in the American comics industry that year.

Soule's series Letter 44, illustrated by Alberto Jiménez Alburquerque, was an official selection of the 2016 Festival International de la Bande Dessinée in Angoulême, France, recognizing it as one of the best graphic titles published in the French language in the preceding year.

Superman/Wonder Woman: Power Couple, the first collected trade paperback of the monthly series, received the 2015 Stan Lee Excelsior Award.

Soule's series 27: First Set (with Renzo Podesta) was included on the "Great Graphic Novels" list from the Young Adult Library Services Association (YALSA) in 2012. In 2016, Soule's run on She-Hulk (with Javier Pulido and Ronald Wimberly) were included on YALSA's Great Graphic Novels for Teens.

== Personal life ==
As of 2019, Soule was based in Brooklyn, New York.

== Bibliography ==
=== Del Rey ===
- Star Wars: Light of the Jedi (First novel in the Star Wars: The High Republic series, January 5, 2021, ISBN 0-593-15771-0)
- Star Wars: Trials of the Jedi (Last novel in Star Wars: The High Republic series, 2025)

=== Harper Perennial ===
- The Oracle Year (Soule's debut novel, 416 pages, April 3, 2018, ISBN 0-06-268663-1)
- Anyone (Novel, 432 pages, December 3, 2019, ISBN 0-06-289063-8)
- The Endless Vessel (Novel, 464 pages, June 6, 2023, ISBN 0-06-304304-1)

=== SLG Publishing ===
- Strongman (graphic novel, with Allen Gladfelter, 120 pages, March 2009, ISBN 1-59362-152-3)
- Strongman Volume Two: Oaxaca Tapout (graphic novel, with Allen Gladfelter, 144 pages, July 2014, ISBN 1-59362-206-6)

=== Image Comics ===
- Twenty-Seven (4-issue limited series, with Renzo Podesta, December 2010 – March 2011, collected in First Set, trade paperback, 136 pages, 2011, ISBN 1-60706-382-4)
- Twenty Seven: Second Set (four-issue limited series, with Renzo Podesta, September–December 2011, collected in Volume 2: Second Set, tpb, 112 pages, 2012, ISBN 1-60706-521-5)
- Skullkickers #18: "Son of Tavern Tales" (2012, collected in Skullkickers Treasure Trove Volume 2, hc, 320 pages, 2013, ISBN 1-60706-794-3)
- Curse Words (ongoing series, with Ryan Browne, January 2017 – November 2019)
- Undiscovered Country (ongoing series, with Scott Snyder, Giseppe Camuncoli, Daniele Orlandini, and Matt Wilson, November 2019-onward)
- Eight Billion Genies (eight-issue limited series, with Ryan Browne, May 2022 – April 2023, collected in Eight Billion Genies, hc, July 2023, ISBN 978-1-5343-2353-7)

=== Archaia Studios Press ===
- Strange Attractors (five-issue limited series, with Greg Scott, December 2012 – April 2013, collected in Strange Attractors, hc, 128 pages, 2013, ISBN 1-936393-62-X)

=== DC Comics ===
- Swamp Thing Vol. 5 #19–40 (April 2013 – March 2015)
  - Volume 4: Seeder #19–23 (tpb, 144 pages, 2014, ISBN 1-4012-4639-7)
  - Volume 5: The Killing Field #24–27 (tpb, 136 pages, 2014, ISBN 1-4012-5052-1)
  - Volume 6: The Sureen #28–34 (tpb, 176 pages, 2015, ISBN 1-4012-5490-X)
  - Volume 7: Season's End #35–40 (tpb, 200 pages, 2016, ISBN 1-4012-5770-4)
- Red Lanterns #21–37 (June 2013 – December 2014)
  - Volume 4: Blood Brothers #21–26 (tpb, 176 pages, 2014, ISBN 1-4012-4742-3)
  - Volume 5: Atrocities #27–34 (tpb, 272 pages, 2014, ISBN 1-4012-5090-4)
  - Volume 6: Forged in Blood #35–37 (tpb, #160 pages, ISBN 1-4012-5484-5)
- New Gods: Godhead #35–37 (hc, 424 pages, 2015, ISBN 1-4012-5847-6)
- Action Comics vol. 2 #23.3 (with Raymund Bermudez, November 2013)
- Green Lantern vol. 5 #23.3 (with Alberto Ponticelli, November 2013)
- Superman/Wonder Woman #1–12 (October 2013 – November 2014)
  - Volume 1: Power Couple #1–6 (hc, 192 pages, 2014, ISBN 1-4012-4898-5)
  - Volume 2: War & Peace #7–12 (hc, 224 pages, 2015, ISBN 1-4012-5347-4)
- Superman: Doomed #1–2 (among with other artists, May 2014 – September 2014) collected in Superman: Doomed (hc, 544 pages, 2015, ISBN 1-4012-5240-0)

=== Marvel Comics ===
- Thunderbolts vol. 2 #12–26 (July 2013 – May 2014)
  - Volume 2: Red Scare #7–12 (tpb, 136 pages, 2013, ISBN 0-7851-6695-5)
  - Volume 3: Infinity #13–19 (tpb, 160 pages, 2014, ISBN 0-7851-6696-3)
  - Volume 4: No Mercy #20–26 (tpb, 160 pages, 2014, ISBN 0-7851-8982-3)
- She-Hulk vol. 3 #1–12 (February 2014 – February 2015)
  - Volume 1: Law and Disorder #1–6 (tpb, 136 pages, 2014, ISBN 0-7851-9019-8)
  - Volume 2: Disorderly Conduct #7–12 (tpb, 136 pages, 2015, ISBN 0-7851-9020-1)
- Inhuman #1–14 (April 2014 – April 2015)
  - Volume 1: Genesis #1–6 (tpb, 136 pages, 2014, ISBN 0-7851-8577-1)
  - Volume 2: Axis #7–11 (tpb, 112 pages, 2015, ISBN 0-7851-8780-4)
  - Volume 3: Lineage #12–14 (tpb, 104 pages, 2015, ISBN 0-7851-9804-0)
  - Original Sins #3: "Whispers of War" (with Ryan Browne, 2014)
- Death of Wolverine #1–4 (September 2014 – October 2014)
  - Death of Wolverine #1–4 (hc, 144 pages, 2015, ISBN 0-7851-9351-0)
- Death of Wolverine: The Logan Legacy #1, 7 (2014–2015)
- Death of Wolverine: The Weapon X Program #1–5 (November 2014 – January 2015)
  - Death of Wolverine: The Weapon X Program (tpb, 136 pages, 2015, ISBN 0-7851-9260-3) collects:
    - "Phase One: Question" (with Salvador Larroca, in #1, 2014)
    - "Hypothesis" (with Salvador Larroca, in #2, 2014)
    - "Experimentation" (with Salvador Larroca, in #3, 2014)
    - "Analysis" (with Angel Unzueta, in #4, 2014)
    - "Conclusion" (with Angel Unzueta and Iban Coello, in #5, 2015)
- Wolverines (January 2015 – May 2015)
  - Volume 1: Dancing with the Devil #1, 3, 5 (with Nick Bradshaw, Juan Doe and Jonathan Marks, tpb, 112 pages, 2015, ISBN 0-7851-9286-7)
  - Volume 2: Claw, Blade and Fang #7, 9 (with Kris Anka, Peter Nguyen, tpb, 112 pages, 2015, ISBN 0-7851-9287-5)
  - Volume 3: The Living and the Dead #11, 13 (with Ariela Kristantina and Jason Masters, tpb, 112 pages, 2015, ISBN 0-7851-9735-4)
  - Volume 4: Destiny #16, 19–20 (with Ario Anindito, Ariela Kristantina and Juan Doe, tpb, 112 pages, 2015, ISBN 0-7851-9767-2)
- Uncanny Inhumans #0–20 (April 2015 – March 2016)
  - Volume 1: Time Crush #0–4 (tpb, 144 pages, 2016, ISBN 0-7851-9706-0)
  - Volume 2: The Quiet Room #5–10 (tpb, 136 pages, 2016, ISBN 0-7851-9707-9)
  - Volume 3: Civil War II #11–14 (tpb, 112 pages, 2016, ISBN 0-7851-9991-8)
  - Volume 4: IvX #15–20 (tpb, 136 pages, 2017, ISBN 978-1-302-90312-1)
- Inhumans: Attilan Rising #1–5 (May–September 2015)
  - Inhumans: Attilan Rising #1–5 (tpb, 112 pages, 2015, ISBN 0-7851-9875-X)
- Civil War vol. 2 (5-issue limited series, with Leinil Francis Yu, July 2015 – October 2015, collected in Civil War: Warzones!, tpb, 120 pages, 2016, ISBN 0-7851-9866-0)
- Star Wars: Lando (5–issue limited series, with Alex Maleev, July 2015 – October 2015, collected in Star Wars: Lando, tpb, 112 pages, 2016, ISBN 0-7851-9319-7)
- All-New Inhumans #1–4 (November 2015 – February 2016)
  - Volume 1: Global Outreach #1–4 (with James Asmus, Stefano Caselli and Nico León, tpb, 112 pages, 2016, ISBN 0-7851-9638-2)
- Daredevil Vol. 5 #1–28 #595–612 (December 2015 – November 2018)
  - Volume 1: Chinatown #1–5 (tpb, 120 pages, 2016, ISBN 0-7851-9644-7)
  - Volume 2: Supersonic #6–9 and Annual #1 (tpb, 120 pages, 2016, ISBN 0-7851-9645-5)
  - Volume 3: Dark Art #10–14 (tpb, 112 pages, 2017, ISBN 978-1-302-90297-1)
  - Volume 4: Identity #15–20 (tpb, 136 pages, 2017, ISBN 978-1-302-90562-0)
  - Volume 5: Supreme #21–28 (tpb, 112 pages, 2017, ISBN 978-1-302-90563-7)
  - Volume 6: Mayor Fisk #595–600 (tpb, 136 pages, 2018, ISBN 978-1-302-91062-4)
  - Volume 7: Mayor Murdock #601–605 (tpb, 112 pages, 2018, ISBN 1-302-91063-9)
  - Volume 8: Death of Daredevil # 606–612 (tpb, 168 pages, 2018, ISBN 1-302-91452-9)
- Gwenpool Holiday Special, "Ever Green" (with Langdon Foss, December 2015)
- Star Wars: Obi-Wan & Anakin (5-issue limited series, with Marco Chechetto, January 2016 – May 2016, collected in Star Wars: Obi-Wan and Anakin, tpb, 112 pages, 2016, ISBN 0-7851-9679-X)
- Daredevil/The Punisher: Seventh Circle (4-issue limited series with Szymon Kudranski and Reilly Brown, March 2016 – June 2016, collected in Daredevil/Punisher: Seventh Circle, tpb, 128 pages, 2016, ISBN 1-302-90232-6)
- Star Wars: Poe Dameron #1–31 (April 2016 – September 2018)
  - Volume 1: Black Squadron #1–6 (tpb, 144 pages, 2016, ISBN 1-302-90110-9)
  - Volume 2: The Gathering Storm: #7–13 (tpb, 144 pages, 2017, ISBN 1-302-90111-7)
  - Volume 3: Legends Lost #14–19 (tpb, 136 pages, 2017, ISBN 978-1-302-90742-6)
  - Volume 4: Legend Found #20–25 (tpb, 160 pages, 2018, ISBN 1-302-90743-3)
  - Volume 5: The Spark and The Fire #26–31 (tpb, 176 pages, 2018, ISBN 1-302-91170-8)
- Death of X (4-issue limited series with Jeff Lemire, Aaron Kuder and Javier Garrón, October–November 2016)
- Inhumans vs. X-Men #0–6 (with Kenneth Rocafort, Jeff Lemire and Leinil Francis Yu, November 2016 – March 2017)
- Star Wars: Darth Vader – Dark Lord of the Sith #1–25 (June 2017 – December 2018)
  - Volume 1: Imperial Machine #1–6 (tpb, 144 pages, 2017, ISBN 1-302-90744-1)
  - Volume 2: Legacy's End #7–12 (tpb, 136 pages, 2018, ISBN 978-1-302-90745-7)
  - Volume 3: The Burning Seas #13–18 (tpb, 136 pages, 2018, ISBN 978-1-302-91056-3
  - Volume 4: Fortress Vader #19–25 (tpb, 168 pages, 2019, ISBN 1-302-91057-4)
- Astonishing X-Men Vol. 4 #1–12 (June 2017 – May 2018)
  - Volume 1: Life of X #1–6 (tpb, 144 pages, 2018, ISBN 978-1-302-90850-8)
  - Volume 2: A Man Called X (tpb, 136 pages, 2018, ISBN 978-1-302-90851-5)
- Star Wars: The Rise of Kylo Ren (4-issue limited series, December 2019 – March 2020)
- Star Wars vol. 3 #1—50 (January 2020 — September 2024)
  - Volume 1: The Destiny Path #1-6 (tpb, 136 pages, 2020, ISBN 978-1-302-92078-4)
  - Volume 2: Operation Starlight #7-11 (tpb, 120 pages, 2021, ISBN 978-1-302-92079-1)
  - Volume 3: War of the Bounty Hunters #12-18 (tpb, 168 pages, 2021, ISBN 978-1-302-92080-7)
  - Volume 4: Crimson Reign #19-23 (tpb, 160 pages, 2022, ISBN 978-1-302-92618-2)
  - Volume 5: The Path to Victory #26-30 (tpb, 120 pages, 2023, ISBN 978-1-302-93274-9)
  - Volume 6: Quests of the Force #31-36 (tpb, 144 pages, 2023, ISBN 978-1-302-94808-5)
  - Volume 7: Dark Droids #37-41 (tpb, 120 pages, 2024, ISBN 978-1-302-94809-2)
  - Volume 8: The Sith and the Skywalker #42-45 (tpb, 152 pages, 2024, ISBN 978-1-302-95478-9)
  - Volume 9: The Path of Light #46-50 (tpb, 120 pages, 2024, ISBN 978-1-302-95479-6)
- Star Wars: War of the Bounty Hunters (6-issue limited series, May 2021 – October 2021)
- Star Wars: Crimson Reign (5-issue limited series, December 2021 – June 2022)
- Star Wars: Legacy of Vader – #1–12 (February 2025 – January 2026)

=== Idaho Comics Group ===
- Tarzan and the Comics of Idaho #1 (August 2014) (Idaho Comics Group; Contains a snippet of the as yet unpublished Strongman Volume Two: Oaxaca Tapout)

=== Dynamite Entertainment ===
- Pathfinder: Goblins! #2: "The Glorious Demise of Gurgle & Deep" (with Alberto Jiménez Alburquerque, September 2013)

=== Oni Press ===
- Letter 44 #1–35 (with Alberto Jiménez Alburquerque, October 2013 – August 2017) collected as:
  - Volume 1: Escape Velocity (collects #1–6, tpb, 144 pages, 2014, ISBN 1-62010-133-5)
  - Volume 2: Redshift (collects #8–13, tpb, 160 pages, 2015, ISBN 1-62010-206-4)
  - Volume 3: Dark Matter (collects #15–20, tpb, 160 pages, 2016, ISBN 1-62010-272-2)
  - Volume 4: Saviors (collects #22—27, tpb, 160 pages, 2017, ISBN 978-1-62010-355-5)
  - Volume 5: Blueshift (collects Issues #7, #14, #21, #28, and #32, one-shot background stories of the characters, tpb, 136 pages, 2017, ISBN 978-1-62010-446-0)
  - Volume 6: The End (collects #29–31, 33–35, tpb, 160 pages, 2018, ISBN 978-1-62010-468-2)

== Notes ==
Preceded by Scott Snyder	Swamp Thing writer 2013–2015	Succeeded by Len Wein
Preceded by Daniel Way	Thunderbolts writer 2013–2014	Succeeded by Ben Acker & Ben Blacker
Preceded by Peter David (Volume 2)	She-Hulk writer 2014–2015	Succeeded by Mariko Tamaki (as Hulk)
Preceded by Mark Waid	Daredevil writer 2015–2018	Succeeded by Chip Zdarsky
Preceded by Marjorie Liu	Astonishing X-Men writer 2017–2018	Succeeded by Matthew Rosenberg
