= Star Wars: Light of the Jedi =

2021 science fiction novel by Charles Soule

Star Wars: The High Republic: Light of the Jedi
- Author: Charles Soule
- Audio read by: Marc Thompson
- Language: English
- Genre: Science fiction
- Publisher: Del Rey
- Publication date: January 5, 2021
- Publication place: United States
- Media type: Print (hardcover, e-book, audiobook
- Pages: 400
- ISBN: 978-0593157718
- Followed by: The Rising Storm

Star Wars: The High Republic: Light of the Jedi is the first novel of the Star Wars: The High Republic multi-media project launched in 2021. The novel was written by Charles Soule, and is set approximately 200 years before the events of Star Wars: The Phantom Menace. It was followed by a sequel, The Rising Storm.

== Setting ==
The story introduces several powerful Jedi during a time of galactic peace, termed "The High Republic," as they prepare to launch the Starlight Beacon, a massive space station which will aid communication between distant worlds. Interference by the villainous pirate group known as the Nihil creates a catastrophic hyperspace event called "The Great Disaster," which places the Jedi and the planets they protect in danger.

== Plot ==
The Legacy Run, a cargo and passenger ship, speeds through hyperspace and, while attempting to avoid a collision with an unexpected obstacle, shatters into many pieces. The debris from the large vessel begins to emerge from hyperspace at different locations and points in time across the galaxy, causing chaos in shipping routes and disastrous loss of life where the pieces impact occupied planets. The Jedi, led by Avar Kriss, attempt to aid the citizens of the Hetzal System to escape disaster; they use the Force to reroute a piece of the Legacy Run containing dangerous gas away from impacting a sun, which would have caused a supernova explosion.

Republic Chancellor Lina Soh closes the hyperspace lanes. With the opening ceremonies of the newly completed Starlight Beacon only a few weeks away, she tasks the Jedi with discovering the cause of the "emergences" and finding a way to predict the next events. As they search the galaxy for answers, the pirate group known as the Nihil seek to take advantage of the closed hyperspace lanes. Marchion Ro, who holds the title of the Eye of the Nihil, has devised a way to predict the path of the next "emergence," and manipulates the Nihil leaders, the Tempest Runners, into a scheme to blackmail the planets who will soon be destroyed by the debris. The Tempest Runners soon begin to fight with each other and greed overtakes them. One of them reveals his presence to the Republic during a failed blackmail attempt, and the Nihil are confronted in space by Republic and Jedi fighters. Marchion uses the infighting to seize control of the Nihil organization.

Marchion sends Nihil forces to the planet Elphrona to kidnap a wealthy family. Jedi Master Loden Greatstorm and his Padawan Bell Zettifar foil the attempt, but Loden is captured by the Nihil. Marchion confesses to Loden that he orchestrated the Legacy Run's hyperspace accident, the "emergences," and the Jedi's rescue of the family on Elphrona, in order to create the chaos which led to his new control of the Nihil, as well as to capture a Jedi. He has more plans for the Jedi and the Nihil that have yet to be revealed. When the "emergences" cease, Soh re-opens the hyperspace lanes and launches the opening of the Starlight Beacon in an attempt to restore hope to the galaxy.

== Main characters ==
- Avar Kriss, a Jedi Master, considered the best and noblest of the Jedi.
- Loden Greatstorm, a Twi’lek Jedi Master, master of Padawan Bell Zettifar.
- Elzar Mann, a Jedi who forms a close relationship with Avar Kriss.
- Burryaga, a Wookiee Padawan with heightened emotional sensitivity.
- The Nihil, a group of brutal, savage marauders, based in the Outer Rim.
- Marchion Ro, the Eye of the Nihil, an important post within the Nihil organization, who plots the group's attacks.

== Reception ==
In the first week of its release, Light of the Jedi was the #2 best selling novel on Amazon, and #1 on The New York Times Best Seller list of hardcover fiction, staying on the list for four weeks.

Light of the Jedi received mostly positive reviews, though some were mixed on the story and its standing as an introduction to the era. /Film called the novel "an intriguing and ambitious start to a new era," and Screen Rant praised Soule's efforts to launch the new saga: "The galaxy he introduces feels familiar and yet different, gripping in a way that's absolutely thrilling." The Washington Post identifies Light of the Jedi as "a welcoming entry point for newcomers to Star Wars, the lore of which can be intimidating to the uninitiated."

Den of Geek said the novel offers "an excellent adventure if you're able to just stick around long enough to figure things out... Cool creatures, inventive action that bends but never breaks the rules of the Force, and compelling relationships and perspectives are all here. But Light of the Jedi also requires the reader to do some work, with an opening that introduces so many characters there's no time to understand why one should care about any of them."

Forbes also gave Light of the Jedi a mixed reception, calling "the Nihil and their various leaders a lot more interesting than the actual Jedi in this story," claiming "there are way too many perspectives... so much so that it's hard to really pick characters to empathize with." Escapist Magazine criticized the book's "drawn-out pacing and odd creative choices", as well as calling its dialogue stilted and finding Light of the Jedi to be "a fairly traditional disaster story."
