= Star Wars Insider =

Magazine

- Categories: Star Wars, science fiction
- Frequency: Bi-Monthly
- Publisher: Titan Magazines
- Founded: 1987
- First issue: October 1987
- Final issue Number: May 5, 2026; 237
- Country: United States
- Language: English
- Website: titanmagazines.com/t/star-wars-insider/

Star Wars Insider was the official Star Wars magazine. It began in 1987 as the official magazine of The Lucasfilm Fan Club, and was renamed in 1994 to coincide with the release of Star Wars: TIE Fighter.

Its contents included stories, articles relating to the Star Wars universe, letters, and the fan newsletter "Bantha Tracks". In February 2021, Star Wars Insider reached two hundred issues.

On November 10, 2025, it was announced the final publication of the Magazine would wrap up with Issue #237, scheduled to be released in early 2026.

== Content ==
Star Wars Insider had sections that detailed updates in the Star Wars universe, news about events, fan fiction, exclusive previews, short stories, articles that explored the Star Wars universe, questions and answers, excerpts from comics and books, and interviews. Often it had many humorous comics and stories. Recently, it had retained a humorous air, especially with their now-defunct "Dear 2-1B" column. The magazine also featured advertising for many things, (Star Wars-related and non-Star Wars), and a catalog of Star Wars merchandise. One of the sections was called "Bantha Tracks", which was created entirely by the fans.

== Publishers ==
The magazine was last edited by Jonathan Wilkins. It has been published by many different companies. But at Star Wars Celebration IV, Star Wars Insider relaunched under the new publisher: Titan Magazines.

Issues 1-22	The Lucasfilm Fan Club Magazine	Lucasfilm
Issues 23-50	Star Wars Insider	Fantastic Media
Issues 51-61	Star Wars Insider	Wizards of the Coast
Issues 62-76	Star Wars Insider	Paizo Publishing
Issues 77-92	Star Wars Insider	IDG Entertainment
Issues 93-237	Star Wars Insider	Titan Magazines

Star Wars Insider was not delivered to Germany as this country has its own licensed publication, Star Wars -- Das offizielle Magazin ("Star Wars -- The Official Magazine"), which is published quarterly instead of bi-monthly, and features many articles and short stories taken from Star Wars Insider. The same was true of the UK until Titan Magazines took over Star Wars Insider in 2007 and merged it with the UK Star Wars Magazine.
