= Kraglin =

- Kraglin as seen in All-New Guardians of the Galaxy Annual #1.

Publication information
- Publisher: Marvel Comics
- First appearance: Tales to Astonish #46 (August 1963)
- Created by: Stan Lee (writer); Don Heck; Ernie Hart (artists)

In-story information
- Species: A-Chilitarian
- Team affiliations: Ravagers
- Abilities: Can see in several directions at the same time

Kraglin is a fictional character appearing in American comic books published by Marvel Comics. Created by plotter Stan Lee, writer Ernie Hart and artist Don Heck, he first appeared in Tales to Astonish #46 (August 1963). He is a member of the Ravagers.

A version of the character named Kraglin Obfonteri, portrayed by Sean Gunn, appears in the Marvel Cinematic Universe franchise.

== Publication history ==
The character, created by plotter Stan Lee, writer Ernie Hart and artist Don Heck, debuted in Tales to Astonish #46 (cover-dated Aug. 1963). Kraglin is an A-Chilitarian, an alien humanoid and was introduced as a one-off villain that was defeated by Ant-Man and Wasp.

After that single appearance, Kraglin returned in All-New Guardians of the Galaxy Annual #1 (Aug. 2017), by Chad Bowers, Chris Sims and Danilo Beyruth.

== Fictional character biography ==
Kraglin is an A-Chilitarian from the planet A-Chiltar III and has the appearance of a furry, purple being with multi-faceted eyes. When they are in Greece, Ant-Man and Wasp investigate a monster attacking boats in the ocean and encounter a Cyclops that is being used by Kraglin and his fellow A-Chilitarians in capturing people for their plot to study the captive fishermen and sailors and take over Earth.

During the "Secret Empire" storyline, Kraglin resurfaces as a member of Yondu's Ravagers.

== Powers and abilities ==
Kraglin's multi-faceted eyes enable him to see in multiple directions at once.

== In other media ==
=== Television ===
Kraglin, based on the MCU incarnation (see below), appears in the Guardians of the Galaxy episode "Back in Black", voiced by James Arnold Taylor.

=== Marvel Cinematic Universe ===
Kraglin Obfonteri appears in media set in the Marvel Cinematic Universe (MCU), portrayed by Sean Gunn. This version is a Xandarian member of the Ravagers and Yondu Udonta's first mate.

- First appearing in the live-action film Guardians of the Galaxy, Kraglin and the Ravagers track down Peter Quill for betraying them before joining him and the Guardians of the Galaxy to save Xandar from Ronan the Accuser.
- Kraglin appears in the live-action film Guardians of the Galaxy Vol. 2. After inadvertently inciting some of the other Ravagers to launch a mutiny against Yondu, Kraglin helps Yondu kill them before rescuing the Guardians from Ego. Following Yondu's funeral, Kraglin inherits his yaka arrow controller.
- Kraglin makes a cameo appearance in the live-action film Avengers: Endgame, in which he leads the Ravagers in helping the Guardians and the Avengers fight Thanos.
- An alternate timeline version of Kraglin appears in the Disney+ animated series What If...? episode "What If... T'Challa Became a Star-Lord?", with Sean Gunn reprising the role.
- Kraglin appears in the live-action film Thor: Love and Thunder. As of this film, he has become a member of the Guardians.
- Kraglin appears in the live-action television special The Guardians of the Galaxy Holiday Special.
- Kraglin appears in the live-action film Guardians of the Galaxy Vol. 3. Throughout the film, he struggles to use the yaka arrow controller until the High Evolutionary attacks Knowhere, after which he leads their forces in helping the Guardians defeat him and successfully operates the yaka arrow controller.

=== Video games ===
The MCU incarnation of Kraglin appears in Lego Marvel Super Heroes 2 via the Guardians of the Galaxy Vol. 2 DLC pack.
