= Darren Cross =

Marvel Comics supervillain

- Darren Cross as Yellowjacket, as depicted in The Astonishing Ant-Man #12 (September 2016). Art by Brent Shoonover.

Publication information
- Publisher: Marvel Comics
- First appearance: Darren Cross: Marvel Premiere #47 (April 1979); As Yellowjacket: Ant-Man (June 2015); The Astonishing Ant-Man #12 (September 2016)
- Created by: John Byrne; Bob Layton; David Michelinie

In-story information
- Species: Human mutate
- Team affiliations: Cross Technological Enterprises
- Notable aliases: Yellowjacket
- Abilities: Skilled tactician, scientist, and businessman Size-shifting; Superhuman strength, agility, reflexes, senses, and healing Via Yellowjacket suit: Flight; Bio-energy projection; Enhanced durability

Darren Agonistes Cross is a supervillain appearing in Marvel Comics properties. He is the archenemy of Scott Lang (the second superhero to be called Ant-Man), the father of Augustine Cross, and the cousin of Crossfire.

In the Marvel Cinematic Universe (MCU), the character was portrayed in live-action by Corey Stoll in the 2015 film Ant-Man as Yellowjacket (a concept later integrated into the comics with the character as the third version of Yellowjacket in the Marvel Universe), and in the 2023 film Ant-Man and the Wasp: Quantumania as MODOK.

== Publication history ==
Darren Cross debuted in Marvel Premiere #47 (April 1979), and was created by John Byrne and David Michelinie. The character made his first appearance as Yellowjacket in The Astonishing Ant-Man #12 (September 2016), which was written by Nick Spencer and illustrated by Brent Shoonover.

== Fictional character biography ==
Darren Cross is a millionaire and the founder of a successful corporation, which rivals top competitors. Cross was diagnosed with a heart condition due to overwork and was equipped with an experimental pacemaker to save his life. The pacemaker was a success and enhanced Cross's circulatory system, giving him superhuman abilities. However, excessive use weakens his heart. Cross goes through various heart transplants, which lead him to capture surgeon Erica Sondheim to help him. This attracts the attention of Scott Lang, who is looking for Sondheim to save the life of his daughter Cassie Lang. To infiltrate Cross's facility, Lang steals and employs Hank Pym's old Ant-Man equipment. The resulting battle with Lang burns out Cross's heart.

Darren Cross's body is revealed to have been kept in a cryonic state. Augustine Cross, Cross's daughter, forces Sondheim to revive Cross by transplanting Cassie Lang's heart into his body. Cross engages in combat against Ant-Man, who buys time for Sondheim to transplant another heart to Cassie so that she can survive. However, Cross is forced to flee when the Pym Particles now in his body cause him to shrink. Egghead builds the Yellowjacket suit for Cross's use to help him control his powers.

== Powers and abilities ==
Darren Cross possesses a keen scientific mind and is a successful businessman. The experimental nucleorganic pacemaker that saved Cross from his heart condition also granted him superhuman abilities such as enhanced physical attributes, increased sensory perception, and a regenerative healing factor on the same level of power (and physical appearance) as the Hulk, with a pink physical hue. After acquiring a Pym Particle-equipped heart during a heart transplant, Cross gained near uncontrollable size-shifting abilities; he is at risk of growing when angered and shrinking when calm.

=== Equipment ===
The Yellowjacket battlesuit helps Cross control his Pym Particle quantum powers. The Yellowjacket battlesuit grants Cross enhanced durability and flight, in addition to featuring "stingers" that can discharge powerful blasts of bio-electrical energy.

== In other media ==
=== Film ===
Corey Stoll as Darren Cross / Yellowjacket in Ant-Man (2015).

- Darren Cross appears in films set in the Marvel Cinematic Universe (MCU), portrayed by Corey Stoll.
  - Cross first appears in Ant-Man (2015) as Yellowjacket. This version is Hank Pym's former protégé who becomes obsessed with Pym's particle shrinking technology. After Pym refuses to divulge his secrets out of fear of warfare, Cross forces Pym out of Pym Technologies, takes over as the company's CEO, and converts it into Cross Technologies. Cross manages to duplicate the Ant-Man suit designs, which he uses to create the weaponized Yellowjacket suit. He seeks to sell the Yellowjacket prototype to Hydra and the Ten Rings, prompting Pym to recruit Scott Lang as the new Ant-Man to intervene. Cross dons the Yellowjacket suit to fight Lang until Lang disrupts his suit, causing Cross to shrink uncontrollably and disappear into the Quantum Realm.
  - Cross later returns in Ant-Man and the Wasp: Quantumania (2023) as MODOK. Due to his uncontrolled shrinking, he aligned himself with Kang the Conqueror, who placed him in special armor. Cross assists Kang's Quantumnauts in capturing Scott, Cassie Lang, and the rebels with them. After Cassie appeals to his better nature, Cross betrays Kang and sacrifices himself to stop him.
- Darren Cross / Yellowjacket appears in Lego Marvel Super Heroes: Avengers Reassembled, voiced by Travis Willingham.

=== Television ===
Darren Cross / Yellowjacket appears in Ant-Man (2017), voiced by William Salyers.

=== Video games ===
- Darren Cross / Yellowjacket appears as a boss in Marvel: Avengers Alliance.
- Darren Cross / Yellowjacket appears as a playable character in Marvel: Contest of Champions.
- Darren Cross / Yellowjacket appears as a playable character in Marvel: Future Fight. Additionally, his MODOK form appears as an alternate skin for MODOK.
- Darren Cross / Yellowjacket appears in Pinball FX 2, voiced by Kyle Hebert.
- Darren Cross / Yellowjacket appears as a playable character in Lego Marvel's Avengers via DLC.
- Darren Cross / Yellowjacket appears in Marvel Avengers Academy.
- Darren Cross / Yellowjacket appears as a playable character in Marvel Puzzle Quest.
- Darren Cross / Yellowjacket appears in Marvel Snap.

=== Merchandise ===
Darren Cross / Yellowjacket, based on the MCU incarnation, received a figure as part of GameStop-exclusive two-pack alongside Ant-Man in Hasbro's Marvel Studios: The First Ten Years Legends Series.
