= Egghead (Marvel Comics) =

Marvel Comics fictional character

Egghead is an alias used by two supervillains appearing in American comic books published by Marvel Comics.

== Publication history ==
The original version (Elihas Starr) first appeared in Tales to Astonish #38 (Dec. 1962), and was created by Stan Lee, Jack Kirby and Larry Lieber.

The second version first appeared in Dark Reign: Young Avengers #1 (July 2009), and was created by Paul Cornell and Mark Brooks.

== Fictional character biography ==
=== Elihas Starr ===
Egghead

Publication information
- Publisher: Marvel Comics
- First appearance: Tales to Astonish #38 (December 1962)
- Created by: Stan Lee; Jack Kirby; Larry Lieber

In-story information
- Alter ego: Elihas Starr
- Species: Human
- Team affiliations: Emissaries of Evil; Masters of Evil; Intelligencia; Cross Technological Enterprises
- Partnerships: Mad Thinker; Puppet Master
- Abilities: Genius intelligence Extensive knowledge in a wide variety of scientific and technological disciplines Ability to absorb new ideas and knowledge at a seemingly superhuman rate

Elihas Starr was born in Queens, New York. A gifted government research atomic scientist with an egg-shaped head, Starr was dismissed for espionage and resolved to use his intellect as a criminal mastermind. He is dealt a humiliating initial defeat by Ant-Man when he creates a device to communicate with ants and tries to convince them to betray Ant-Man by leading him into a flypaper trap. Ant-Man fakes having been betrayed by the ants before revealing that the ants are his friends and will not turn against him. Egghead later captures the Wasp to try luring his nemesis into a trap involving several creatures, including an iguana and an anteater, but this fails. Egghead divides time between attempted world conquest and seeking revenge on his nemesis, often hiding out in the Bowery section of Manhattan.

Egghead teams up with the Mad Thinker and the Puppet Master in a plot to use a laser satellite to blackmail the United States government. He caused the death of Barney Barton, the brother of Hawkeye, who was aiding the Avengers; hired the Swordsman to kidnap Hank Pym; and battled Clint Barton again, who had at that time recently adopted the identity of Goliath.

Egghead kidnaps his niece, Patricia "Trish" Starr, to test a device which allows him to steal other people's intelligence, and winds up battling Pym as Ant-Man again. He later causes Trish's car to explode, causing her to lose an arm.

Egghead forms the second Emissaries of Evil in an attempt to gain possession of the mystic ruby called the Star of Capistan. This team consists of himself, Rhino, Solarr and the Cobalt Man. Egghead and the Emissaries battle the Defenders.

Egghead is still obsessed with Pym and engineers the man's disgrace. Egghead approaches Pym (who was operating as Yellowjacket at the time) with a prosthetic arm that he wishes to give to Trish to make amends for his previous deeds. After the arm is installed, Egghead informed Pym that it contains a bomb that will detonate unless Pym complies with Egghead's commands. Egghead has Pym attempt to rob a national treasury of adamantium, and Pym is caught and arrested by the Avengers. With Pym apparently out of the way, Egghead forms the third Masters of Evil as part of a plot against the Avengers.

Egghead sends the Masters of Evil to kidnap Pym from his own trial, making it appear as if Pym himself had staged a rescue. The attempt is successful and Egghead instructs Pym to construct an anti-aging device. Subsequently, Pym goads Egghead into letting him test the machine himself. However, the device turns out to be a weapon system, and he single-handedly defeated the assembled Masters of Evil. The Avengers arrive too late to be of assistance, but Hawkeye arrives at the laboratory in time to see the defeated Egghead about to shoot Pym in the back out of spite with his energy blaster. Hawkeye shoots an arrow into Egghead's gun barrel, causing it to misfire. This causes an accidental explosion that kills Egghead instantly.

A flashback in Fall of the Hulks: Alpha showed that Egghead was a member of the Intelligencia prior to his death.

Egghead is resurrected by a "rejuvetech serum" and creates the A.I.Vengers. Computer technician Raz Malhotra eventually escapes Egghead's control and shuts down the A.I.vengers.

Egghead is hired by Darren Cross to work for Cross Technological Enterprises. To help control Cross's Pym Particle abilities, Egghead provides the Yellowjacket armor for his use.

=== Robot ===
A robot version of Egghead appears as a member of the new Young Avengers. Although his original programming was "to respect all human life", Big Zero reprogrammed him to hate minorities. Egghead later appears as a member of Zodiac's army, the Masters of Evil, and the A.I. Army.

== Powers and abilities ==
Although he had no superhuman powers of his own, Elihas Starr's genius level intellect made him a formidable foe. He was particularly skilled in the fields of robotics and engineering, and could absorb new ideas and knowledge at a seemingly superhuman rate. He had a degree in atomic science, and extensive knowledge in a wide variety of scientific and technological disciplines. Starr designed a wide variety of sophisticated weapons and technological paraphernalia.

The robotic Egghead can fly and become intangible.

== In other media ==
=== Television ===
- The Elihas Starr incarnation of Egghead appears in The Avengers: United They Stand episode "Egg-Streme Vengeance", voiced by Robert Cornell Latimer.
- The Elihas Starr incarnation of Egghead appears in The Super Hero Squad Show, voiced by Wayne Knight. This version is a member of Doctor Doom's Lethal Legion.
- The Elihas Starr incarnation of Egghead appears in Avengers Assemble, voiced by Yuri Lowenthal.
- The Elihas Starr incarnation of Egghead appears in the Ant-Man episode "Soup Time", voiced by Sam Riegel.

=== Film ===
- Elihas Starr appears in Avengers Confidential: Black Widow & Punisher, voiced by Hiroki Tōchi in the Japanese version and by Grant George in the English dub. In the movie, he is portrayed as a younger former SHIELD agent with a previous relationship with Black Widow, before creating and taking a super soldier serum for criminal organization Leviathan and turning rogue because of his feelings of inadequacy, due to his lack of abilities, compared to Widow. He ultimately switches sides but is killed sacrificing himself for Widow to the main villain Orion.
- Elihas Starr appears in Ant-Man and the Wasp, portrayed by Michael Cerveris. This version is a former S.H.I.E.L.D. scientist and colleague of Hank Pym and Bill Foster. After being fired for allegedly stealing Pym's research, Starr stole additional technology to create a portal to the Quantum Realm to redeem his scientific reputation. The portal malfunctioned, killing Starr and his wife and afflicting his daughter, Ava Starr, with "molecular disequilibrium", which eventually leads to her being adopted by Foster and becoming Ghost.

=== Video games ===
The Elihas Starr incarnation of Egghead appears as a playable character in Lego Marvel's Avengers.

=== Miscellaneous ===
The Elihas Starr incarnation of Egghead appears in The Amazing Spider-Man, by Stan Lee, Larry Lieber, and Alex Saviuk. This version married J. Jonah Jameson's estranged sister and inherited her share of the Daily Bugle upon her death.
