= Leon Lazarus =

American writer (1919–2008)

- Born: August 22, 1919 The Bronx, New York City, U.S.
- Died: November 28, 2008 (aged 89)
- Areas: Writer, Editor, Publisher

Leon Lazarus (August 22, 1919 – November 28, 2008) was an American writer-editor for publisher Martin Goodman's Magazine Management Company, as well as for Goodman's Timely and Atlas comic book companies, the two predecessors of Marvel Comics. The uncredited author of countless comic-book stories from 1947 through at least 1965 – with his name long considered a possible pseudonym on the rare occasions it appeared – the 85-year-old Lazarus was located in 2005 by comics historians who then initiated efforts to document his credits and fill some of the many gaps in the medium's record.

In addition to comic books, Lazarus wrote paperback books, including two in the "Nick Carter" detective novel series, as well as children's books for Little Golden Books. His magazine writing included pieces for the men's adventure magazines Saga, Stag, and Blue Book, and the more general-interest Coronet.

He is not to be confused with the science fiction book reviewer and writer Dr. Henry Leon Lazarus.

== Biography ==
=== Early life and career ===
Tales to Astonish #64 (Feb. 1965), Lazarus' sole public credit for hundreds of stories for Marvel Comics and its predecessors. Art by Carl Burgos & Paul Reinman. The credit, "Written by Laughin' Leon Lazarus," contains an example of the alliterative endearments common in Marvel credits of the time.

Leon Lazarus was born in The Bronx, New York City, the youngest among siblings Sid Lazarus (March 12, 1912 – circa 1973) and Harry Lazarus (born February 22, 1917), both of whom became comic book artists. He was drafted in the U.S. Army in 1942, and did World War II service in Italy, teaching the use of the then-new technology radar for the Signal Corps. He was honorably discharged in 1945, and married the future Marjorie Lazarus (born March 21, 1922) in May 1946. With the help of friend Bob Landers, an inker for Timely Comics, Lazarus was hired as a staff letterer there by Gary Keller, head of Timely's production department, in November 1947, earning $40 a week. Having written for the Signal Corps and wanting to write for comics, Lazarus after three weeks approached Dave Berg, a staff editor, who purchased a teen-humor story from him. Lazarus then became an associate editor under Don Rico, another staff editor, earning $60 a week plus an additional $40 a week for his freelance writing at the company. Among his duties was to oversee the work of the staff letterers, who then included Mario Aquaviva and Art Simek, and the proofreaders, who included Polly Schwartz and Adele Hasan, future wife of cartoonist and Mad magazine founder Harvey Kurtzman.

When Berg, Rico and fellow editor Ernie Hart moved on, later in the 1940s, Lazarus worked as an assistant to Al Jaffee, who came in as editor of the teen-humor line. As cartoonist and comics commentator Fred Hembeck observed, "Leon read through all the submissions, weeding out the junk and only passing on the worthwhile material to Jaffee; and Leon had mastered the ability to improve a six-pager with just a few judicious edits. Plus, Al really liked the guy. Basically, Jaffee found him indispensable". Among the writers with whom Lazarus worked as an editor was Patricia Highsmith, the future novelist, whose early career included writing romance comics for Timely/Atlas.

Marjorie Lazarus in 1948 and 1949 separately contributed "44 or 45" two-page text-filler stories. She was assigned these freelance pieces not by her husband, but by Joellen Murdock, a secretary who made those assignments. Leon Lazarus wrote approximately 40 of these, in addition to what he estimated were "over 800 comic book stories."

Lazarus was let go from Timely, along with virtually all the staff save for editor-in-chief Stan Lee and secretary Murdock, on a Friday in January 1950.

=== Magazine Management ===
After leaving Timely, Lazarus freelanced for the company as it transitioned to being known as Atlas Comics during the 1950s. Under editor-in-chief Stan Lee, his work there, he recalled in a late-2000s interview, included the Western comic books Black Rider, The Arizona Kid and Kid Colt, Outlaw. Lazarus additionally wrote for Ziff-Davis, under editor Jerry Siegel, doing stories for Kid Cowboy, G.I. Joe (unrelated to the later Hasbro action figures) and other comic books for about a year, and also did work for the writer/artist team of Joe Simon and Jack Kirby, and for American Comics Group (AGC), under editor Richard E. Hughes.

Shortly after Atlas briefly suspended publishing in 1957, following the collapse of the company's newsstand distributor, Lazarus began writing for Magazine Management, the parent company owned by publisher Martin Goodman. Under editor Noah Sarlett, Lazarus said, "I wrote 350 stories for their men's magazines, going into the 1960s. I also worked for [staff editor and future best-selling author] Bruce Jay Friedman." When Lazarus himself was briefly employed as a staff editor there, he worked with such staff writers as Mario Puzo, future author of The Godfather.

Lazarus had two public credits during the 1960s Silver Age of comic books: the suspense-mystery story "Wes Wilson, Worry-Wart" in the American Comics Group (AGC) comic Unknown Worlds #6 (March 1961); and the Giant-Man superhero story "When Attuma Strikes" in Tales to Astonish #64 (Feb. 1965). His Marvel Comics credit, during the period in which the former Timely/Atlas began establishing itself as a significant force in popular culture, came about, Lazarus recalled, when publisher Goodman

...started pressuring [editor-in-chief and head writer] Stan [Lee] to have other writers do some of the stories. He wasn't sold on [the Marvel Method] of doing stories [in which writers would supply artists with a plot synopsis, rather than full script, allowing artists to tell the story's visual narrative with their own pacing and details]. He became concerned that Stan would have too much leverage over him, and he worried about what would happen if Stan ever decided to leave the company. Goodman wanted other writers as a back-up in case he needed them, so he ordered Stan to use other writers. ... Goodman told Stan to, 'Have Leon write stories.' Stan called me and up and asked if I was willing to come in and work there again. ... I didn't want to say 'no' because I was working for Goodman's men's magazines, and didn't want to lose the account. ... I only did this one story, because I wasn't comfortable with the way Stan wanted writers to work with the artists, though I see now how right he was.

== Family ==
Lazarus' brothers, Harry Lazarus and Sid Lazarus, did magazine illustrations, and Harry as well variously penciled or both wrote and drew stories for a number of comic book companies from 1944 to the mid-1960s. He was living in West Orange, New Jersey, at the time of his death at age 89.

Leon and Marjorie Lazarus had two daughters: Rochelle, who as of January 2009 was press and communications director for the Tenafly, New Jersey, Jewish cultural center Kaplen JCC on the Palisades, and Sherry, an editor for an online art museum, the Art Renewal Center.

== Bibliography ==
=== Books ===
- Lassie and the Lost Explorer (Simon & Schuster/Little Golden Book, 1958; illustrated by Frank Bolle)
- Tales of Wells Fargo: Danger at Mesa Flats (Simon & Schuster/Little Golden Book, 1958; illustrated by John Leone)
- Nick Carter: The Turncoat by Nick Carter (House pseudonym used by Leon Lazarus)
- Other Times, Other Places (Xlibris, 2001, ISBN 1-4134-0690-4; Replica Books 2004)

=== Articles ===
- Coronet (Aug. 1965): "Electronic Lifesavers" by Leon Lazarus
