= Mitchell Carson =

Comic book character

Publication information
- Publisher: Marvel Comics
- First appearance: Marvel Team-Up (vol. 3) #21 (August 2006)
- Created by: Robert Kirkman (writer); Andy Kuhn (artist)

In-story information
- Alter ego: Mitch Carson, Ant-Man
- Species: Human
- Team affiliations: S.H.I.E.L.D.
- Abilities: S.H.I.E.L.D. training

Agent Mitchell "Mitch" Carson is a fictional character appearing in American comic books published by Marvel Comics.

The character was portrayed in live-action by actor Martin Donovan in the Marvel Cinematic Universe 2015 film Ant-Man.

== Publication history ==
Created by writers Robert Kirkman and Andy Kuhn, he first appeared in Marvel Team-Up (vol. 3) #21. He was the primary antagonist in the 2006 Irredeemable Ant-Man series.

== Fictional character biography ==
Mitch Carson is a high-ranked security agent of S.H.I.E.L.D. When he was fifteen years old, Carson killed his father, but managed to escape capture.

Carson was supposed to become the wearer of the new Ant-Man suit made for S.H.I.E.L.D. by Hank Pym. When Eric O'Grady takes the suit, Carson becomes determined to capture him. While pursuing O'Grady, Carson is heavily burned on the left side of his face.

Using an older Ant-Man suit, Carson manages to confront and capture O'Grady. Instead of bringing O'Grady to justice, however, Carson plans to torture him. Iron Man intervenes and rescues O'Grady. O'Grady falsely claims that Carson stole the suit and killed S.H.I.E.L.D. agent Chris McCarthy, causing Carson to be arrested.

== Powers and abilities ==
Mitchell Carson has S.H.I.E.L.D. training, specifically in firearms/explosives, espionage, intelligence gathering, and hand-to-hand combat. He gained access to an old Ant-Man suit which he used to shrink and take out the more advanced Ant-Man suit utilized by Eric O'Grady.

== In other media ==
Martin Donovan as Mitchell Carson in Ant-Man (2015).

Mitchell Carson appears in Ant-Man, portrayed by Martin Donovan. This version is an agent of Hydra who previously worked undercover as the Head of Defense of S.H.I.E.L.D. during the 1990s and partook in S.H.I.E.L.D.'s failed attempt at replicating Hank Pym's Pym Particles. In the present, Carson and a group of Hydra agents meet with Darren Cross, Pym's former protégé who had successfully created his own formula and developed the Yellowjacket battlesuit. After Pym, Scott Lang, and Hope van Dyne intervene, Carson escapes with Cross's replicated technology.
