= Ant-Man (Scott Lang) =

Marvel Comics fictional character

Scott Lang Ant-Man
- Textless cover of Ant-Man #5 (November 2015). Art by Mark Brooks.

Publication information
- Publisher: Marvel Comics
- First appearance: As Scott Lang: The Avengers #181 (March 1979); As Ant-Man: Marvel Premiere #47 (April 1979)
- Created by: David Michelinie; Bob Layton; John Byrne

In-story information
- Alter ego: Scott Edward Harris Lang
- Species: Human
- Team affiliations: Avengers; Defenders; Fantastic Four; Future Foundation; Guardians of the Galaxy; Heroes for Hire; Stark Industries; Mighty Avengers; New Avengers
- Partnerships: Hank Pym; Wasp; Stinger; Nadia van Dyne
- Notable aliases: Ant-Man
- Abilities: Genius-level intellect; Ant-Man suit granting: Ability to shrink to sub-microscopic size and enter the subatomic universes; Size-shifting from nearly microscopic to ~100 feet gigantic (both at extremes); Ability to transfer his size-shifting ability to other beings and objects; Uses Pym particle discs that allow Ant-Man to will himself and other objects to reduce in size or enlarge; Maintains strength of normal size in shrunken state; Helmet with a retractable plexiglass face shield and a limited air supply; Telepathic communication with ants using a cybernetic helmet (as Ant-Man); Superhuman strength, stamina, durability and mass at giant or regular form

Ant-Man (Scott Edward Harris Lang) is a fictional character appearing in American comic books published by Marvel Comics. Created by David Michelinie, Bob Layton and John Byrne, Scott Lang first appeared in The Avengers #181 (March 1979) and in Marvel Premiere #47 (April 1979) as the second superhero character to use the Ant-Man name in the Marvel Universe. He is a reformed thief and an electronics expert. He was a member of the Avengers, the Fantastic Four and the Guardians of the Galaxy, the main character in the comic-book series FF and, in 2015, he became the title character in the series Ant-Man.

Scott Lang is an ex-convict and electronics expert hired by Stark International, which enables him to steal the Ant-Man suit from Hank Pym, who had long since given up the name, to help his sick daughter. When Pym finds out, he gives the suit to Lang, allowing him to become the second Ant-Man. As Ant-Man, he serves as an Avenger for years, until he is killed during the Avengers Disassembled storyline. Years later, he is resurrected in the Avengers: The Children's Crusade mini-series. Following his resurrection, Lang heads the Future Foundation and founds his own company, the Ant-Man Security Solutions.

Paul Rudd plays Scott Lang in the Marvel Cinematic Universe films Ant-Man (2015), Captain America: Civil War (2016), Ant-Man and the Wasp (2018), Avengers: Endgame (2019), Ant-Man and the Wasp: Quantumania (2023), and the upcoming Avengers: Doomsday (2026), the web series WHIH Newsfront (2015), and the animated series What If...? (2021) and Marvel Zombies (2025). Additionally, Crispin Freeman, Josh Keaton, and Grant George have voiced Lang in animation.

== Publication history ==
Created by David Michelinie, Bob Layton and John Byrne, Scott Lang first appeared in The Avengers #181 (cover-dated March 1979) and as the second Ant-Man in Marvel Premiere #47 (April 1979). Michelinie had long been an enthusiast of shrinking heroes, and saw Hank Pym's return to the Yellowjacket guise as an opportunity to take over the discarded Ant-Man identity. He explained how he came up with the character:

I wanted something completely different, in both origin and motivation, from Pym. So I came up with the idea of a reformed criminal - not an unjustly accused innocent, which would have been the expected angle. And I figured that, as a burglar, he probably enjoyed the adrenaline rush of his previous 'job,' so the excitement of heroic adventure could fill that need in him, but legally.

Though Ant-Man's two-issue tryout in Marvel Premiere failed to garner the character his own series, the dynamic of a single father and reformed criminal in the superhero role struck a chord with readers and led to Ant-Man enjoying modest popularity and frequent appearances in Marvel Comics thereafter.

Ant-Man appeared prominently in the FF series (2012) by Matt Fraction and Mike Allred.

An ongoing series focusing on Lang, titled simply Ant-Man written by Nick Spencer and drawn by Ramon Rosanas, began in January 2015. After Marvel's Secret Wars event, the series continued with the title Astonishing Ant-Man.

== Fictional character biography ==
=== Early life ===
Scott Lang was born in Coral Gables, Florida. A movie fanatic, he turned to burglary to support his family. Apprehended, Lang served his prison sentence and was paroled after four years for good behavior. In prison, he furthered his study of electronics and was soon hired by Stark International to work in its design department. Under Tony Stark's direction, he helped install a new security system in Avengers Mansion.

=== The second Ant-Man ===
When his daughter Cassie becomes seriously ill, Lang seeks out Dr. Erica Sondheim, the only person capable of helping her. However, when he attempts to contact her, Sondheim is kidnapped by Cross Technological Enterprises. Lang breaks into Hank Pym's home and steals his Ant-Man suit and shrinking gas canisters. As Ant-Man, Lang breaks into Cross Enterprises and discovers that Sondheim is being held prisoner by Darren Cross. He rescues Sondheim, who in turn treats Cassie. After being confronted by Pym, Lang intends to return the Ant-Man suit to Pym, but is allowed to keep it as long as he uses it for good.

=== Hero ===
Ant-Man works in a back-up Avengers team created when Helmut Zemo's Masters of Evil takes control of the Mansion and captures some of the current team. He helps Wasp defeat Absorbing Man and Titania when they attack a hospital in an attempt to kill a comatose Hercules.

Lang is briefly hired by the Fantastic Four to serve as their technical consultant when Reed Richards is missing and presumed dead. During this period, Lang learns that Cassie had long since found out about his double life as a superhero. Lang later returns to form a temporary Fantastic Four with the Human Torch, She-Hulk, and Namorita when the other three members of the group are trapped in the Negative Zone.

After his ex-wife Peggy Rae gains custody of Cassie, Lang accepts an offer to join the Avengers officially. His personality immediately clashes with fellow Avenger Jack of Hearts. Jack helps save Cassie from a child-murderer, shortly before committing suicide by traveling into space with the murderer and exploding rather than be confined to control his powers.

=== Death and return ===
When Jack of Hearts reappears on the grounds of Avengers Mansion in a zombified state, Scott Lang rushes to Jack, only for Jack to blow himself up, destroying much of the mansion and seemingly killing Lang.

In the series Avengers: The Children's Crusade, Iron Lad takes the Young Avengers and an amnesiac Wanda Maximoff into the past. Despite Iron Lad's insistence not to interfere, Lang is rescued from Jack of Hearts. When Jack explodes, Maximoff regains her memories and returns Lang and the Young Avengers to the present. A subsequent battle ensues regarding what the Avengers should do with Maximoff, during which Cassie Lang is killed by Doctor Doom.

An alternate universe version of Lang joins the new Defenders team composed of Doctor Strange, Silver Surfer, Namor, Red She-Hulk, Iron Fist, and Black Cat. The main universe Lang becomes the Future Foundation's leader, replacing Reed Richards while the Fantastic Four go on a time travel trip. Still suffering from Cassie's death, Lang focuses the Foundation's resources on making Doctor Doom pay for his crimes.

During the "AXIS" storyline, a now-heroic and repentant Doctor Doom resurrects Cassie Lang. Following this, Lang moves to Miami to start a new life as well as to spend more time with his daughter. When Cassie is kidnapped by Crossfire to revive Darren Cross, Lang is forced to turn to the villains Grizzly and Machinesmith to save Cassie. Cross is successfully revived after Cassie's heart is transplanted into his body. Cassie has a second heart transplanted into her body to allow her to survive. Lang shrinks down to microscopic size to attack Cassie's white cells and allow her body to accept the new heart's tissue. Lang decides to distance himself from Cassie so that she can have a normal life.

During the "Secret Empire" storyline, Ant-Man joins the resistance group against Hydra after they take over the United States After seeing footage from Rick Jones, explaining Steve Rogers' conversion into Hydra's supreme leader, Ant-Man joins Hawkeye in the search for the Cosmic Cube fragments to restore Rogers to normal. It is eventually revealed that Hydra found and captured Cassie, forcing Ant-Man to become a double agent to save her life. He confesses his treachery just as Hydra forces arrive and destroy the resistance's hideout. During the final battle, Ant-Man shrinks Bucky Barnes down so that he can enter the Cosmic Cube and reawaken Kobik. This allows Kobik to bring back the original Steve Rogers, who defeats his Hydra doppelganger. With his reputation tarnished due to his betrayal, Ant-Man joins the Guardians of the Galaxy to get away from Earth for a while.

== Powers and abilities ==
Using a gaseous form of "Pym particles" kept in a compartment in his belt, Ant-Man initially had the power to shrink himself (and other people and objects along with himself) to the size of an ant and return to normal. Over time, he has acquired the ability to change size at will. He can also shrink to sub-microscopic size, and thereby enter "subatomic universes". He retains his normal strength in ant size.

Lang also discovered the true secret of Pym Particle technology, using it along an axis of three enhancement and reduction vectors. Enabling access of phy. augmentation without growing or shrinking to various sizes. The cybernetic Ant-Man helmet allows rudimentary telepathic communication with insects, and is equipped with sound amplification equipment allowing normal-sized humans to hear its wearer. The helmet also has a retractable plexiglass face shield and a limited air supply.

Lang has advanced training and expertise in electronics, having earned an electronics technician certificate, plus additional advanced electronics training he received while in prison. At times, Lang even made his own modifications to the Ant-Man equipment, such as installing the Pym gas dispenser in his helmet rather than leaving it on his belt, or mounting an electric disruptor into his helmet for offensive purposes.

== In other media ==
=== Television ===
- Scott Lang / Ant-Man appears in The Avengers: Earth's Mightiest Heroes, voiced by Crispin Freeman.
- Scott Lang / Ant-Man appears in Avengers Assemble, voiced by Grant George in the first three seasons and by Josh Keaton in the last two seasons.
- Scott Lang / Ant-Man appears in Ultimate Spider-Man, voiced again by Grant George.
- Scott Lang / Ant-Man appears in Lego Marvel Super Heroes: Avengers Reassembled, voiced again by Grant George.
- Scott Lang / Ant-Man appears in Guardians of the Galaxy, voiced again by Grant George in the second season and by Josh Keaton in the third season.
- Scott Lang / Ant-Man appears in a Coke Mini commercial that premiered during Super Bowl 50, with Paul Rudd reprising his role from the Marvel Cinematic Universe films.
- Scott Lang / Ant-Man appears in a series of self-titled animated shorts, voiced again by Josh Keaton.
- Scott Lang / Ant-Man appears in Marvel Super Hero Adventures, voiced by Adrian Petriw.
- Scott Lang / Ant-Man appears in Spidey and His Amazing Friends, voiced by Sean Giambrone. This version is credited with creating size-changing particles.
- Scott Lang / Ant-Man appears in Lego Marvel Avengers: Time Twisted, voiced by Ian Hanlin.
- Scott Lang appears as Giant-Man in Iron Man and His Awesome Friends.

=== Marvel Cinematic Universe ===
Paul Rudd portrays Scott Lang / Ant-Man in the live-action Marvel Cinematic Universe films Ant-Man, Captain America: Civil War, Ant-Man and the Wasp, Avengers: Endgame, and Ant-Man and the Wasp: Quantumania. He will reprise the role in the 2026 film Avengers: Doomsday. Additionally, Rudd voices alternate timeline variants of Lang in the Disney+ animated series What If...? (2021) and Marvel Zombies (2025). ″

=== Video games ===
- Scott Lang / Ant-Man appears as a playable character in Marvel Heroes, voiced again by Grant George.
- Scott Lang / Ant-Man appears as a playable character in Marvel: Avengers Alliance.
- Scott Lang / Ant-Man appears in Marvel Contest of Champions.
- Scott Lang / Ant-Man appears in Marvel: Future Fight.
- Scott Lang / Ant-Man appears as a playable character in Disney Infinity 3.0.
- Scott Lang / Ant-Man appears as a playable character in Marvel Puzzle Quest.
- Scott Lang / Ant-Man appears in Marvel Pinball.
- The MCU incarnation of Scott Lang / Ant-Man appears as a DLC character in Lego Marvel's Avengers.
- The MCU incarnation of Scott Lang / Ant-Man appears in Lego Marvel Super Heroes 2.
- Scott Lang / Ant-Man appears as a non-playable character (NPC) in Marvel Ultimate Alliance 3: The Black Order, voiced again by Josh Keaton.

=== Miscellaneous ===
The MCU incarnation of Scott Lang / Ant-Man appears in the Ant-Man and The Wasp: Nano Battle! attraction, with Paul Rudd reprising his role from the films.

== Sources ==
- Anderton, Ethan (February 7, 2016). "Marvel & Coca-Cola Super Bowl Commercial: You Wouldn't Like the Hulk When He's Thirsty". /Film.
- Beard, Jim (August 9, 2012). "Marvel NOW! Q&A: Fantastic Four". Marvel. Archived from the original on 2012-08-13.
- Beard, Jim (October 13, 2014). "NYCC 2014: ANT-MAN". Marvel. Archived from the original on 2015-06-26.
- Cavanaugh, Patrick (July 17, 2015). "Celebrate the Release of Marvel's 'Ant-Man' with Three New 'Marvel Future Fight' Characters". Marvel. Archived from the original on 2015-07-30.
- Cebulski, C.B., ed. (2024). Marvel Encyclopedia: New Edition. DK. ISBN 978-0-593-84611-7.
- Chabala, Ben (July 9, 2015a). "Entering Marvel Contest of Champions: Ant-Man Spotlight". Marvel. Archived from the original on 2015-07-23.
- Chabala, Ben (July 9, 2015b). "Piecing Together Marvel Puzzle Quest: Ant-Man". Marvel. Archived from the original on 2015-07-11.
- Enk, Bryan (January 13, 2014). "Michael Douglas Shrinks Down to Size for 'Ant-Man'". Yahoo!.
- Lovette, Jamie (June 28, 2015). "Sizing Up Scott Lang's Five Best Ant-Man Stories". Comic Book. Archived from the original on 2015-06-30.
- Lovette, Jamie (September 6, 2017). "Sizing Up Scott Lang's Five Best Ant-Man Stories". Comic Book. Archived from the original on 2021-04-04.
- Morse, Ben (July 7, 2015). "Go Inside Avengers Alliance: Ant-Man". Marvel. Archived from the original on 2015-07-24.
- Rivera, Joshua (July 17, 2015). "Ant-man is such a complicated comic-book character, it's a miracle they made a pretty good movie about him". Business Insider.
- Truitt, Brian (January 6, 2015). "'Ant-Man' looms large on Marvel's horizon". USA Today.
