= Avengers Confidential: Black Widow & Punisher =

2014 superhero anime film based on Marvel characters

- DVD cover

Japanese name
- Kanji: アベンジャーズ コンフィデンシャル: ブラック・ウィドウ & パニッシャー
Transcriptions
- Revised Hepburn: Abenjāzu Konfidensharu: Burakku Widō & Panisshā
- Directed by: Kenichi Shimizu
- Screenplay by: Mitsutaka Hirota
- Story by: Marjorie Liu
- Based on: Avengers by: Stan Lee; Jack Kirby; Black Widow by: Stan Lee; Don Rico; Don Heck; Punisher by: Gerry Conway; Ross Andru; John Romita Sr.
- Produced by: Taro Morishima
- Starring: Miyuki Sawashiro; Tesshō Genda; Hideaki Tezuka; Hiroki Tōchi; Masashi Sugawara
- Cinematography: Kenji Fujita
- Music by: Tetsuya Takahashi
- Production companies: Madhouse; Marvel Entertainment
- Distributed by: Sony Pictures Home Entertainment
- Release dates: March 25, 2014 (North America); September 3, 2014 (Japan)
- Running time: 83 minutes
- Country: Japan
- Languages: Japanese; English

Avengers Confidential: Black Widow & Punisher (Japanese: アベンジャーズ コンフィデンシャル: ブラック・ウィドウ & パニッシャー, Hepburn: Abenjāzu Konfidensharu: Burakku Widō & Panisshā) is a 2014 Japanese superhero anime film by Madhouse. The film is produced by SH DTV AC BW&P Partners, the final partnering of Marvel Entertainment with Sony Pictures Entertainment Japan and Madhouse, following up on the Marvel Anime series. It was released in North America on Blu-ray, DVD, and digital on March 25, 2014.

== Plot ==
Vigilante Punisher busts black market weapons dealer Cain who possesses stolen S.H.I.E.L.D. technology. Punisher takes him hostage, inadvertently interfering with S.H.I.E.L.D. agent Black Widow's mission to uncover a larger terror plot. Widow attempts to subdue Punisher, and Cain escapes during the altercation. S.H.I.E.L.D. take Punisher into custody. Having lost their sole lead, Director Nick Fury offers Punisher his freedom in exchange for going on mission with Widow to locate Cain and stop Leviathan, a global terrorist group who plan to auction the stolen technology to the highest bidder.

Widow and Punisher track Cain to a Leviathan base in Slovenia, and discover a lab filled with spies in pods who have been turned into super-powered soldiers by Orion. Punisher captures Cain, who activates a function on his cellphone that emits a flash of light which causes Punisher to lose time. This allows Cain to escape. Widow crosses paths with a former lover and ex-S.H.I.E.L.D. agent, Elihas Starr, who was presumed dead but has been working for Leviathan. Elihas created the super-soldier serum and did it to become worthy of being with her, hoping that she would join him. The two fight while Punisher detonates explosives around the base. Punisher extracts Widow and Elihas disappears.

Punisher has Cain's cellphone, but it is encrypted, and they cannot retrieve any information from it. They take it to S.H.I.E.L.D. super-genius Amadeus Cho who decrypts the phone, but unknowingly activates the flash function. When they come to, the phone's self-destruct function has been activated. A hypnotized Punisher attacks Widow and kills several S.H.I.E.L.D. agents. Meanwhile, Amadeus incinerates the phone, destroying it completely and causing Punisher to snap out of his trance. Widow suspects Elihas' brainwashing technology was controlling Punisher and advocates against his imprisonment. Fury reveals prior knowledge of this technology, as it was originally developed by S.H.I.E.L.D., though it has never been fully implemented. Widow and Punisher were assigned the mission because S.H.I.E.L.D. had contingencies in place should either or both of them be compromised. The same risk could not be taken with the Avengers, who have superpowers. Elihas also stole samples of the Avengers' blood from S.H.I.E.L.D. to use for his project. Fury orders Widow to complete the mission on her own.

Angered that Fury would sacrifice them both, Widow defies his orders and takes Punisher with her to Hong Kong. There, they meet Ren, an information handler with ties to the criminal underworld who reveals that the auction will be held in Madripoor that same night.

At the auction, the duo is overrun by the super soldiers. Hulk and Amadeus join the fight and Elihas activates the mind control technology. Punisher shields Widow while Hulk is protected by a nano-device coating over his eyes that Amadeus created to block the broadcast signals. Punisher and Widow use it on themselves. Widow goes after Elihas, and they start another fight on a catwalk. Elihas kicks Widow over the catwalk's railing, but she manages to hold on. Realizing that he still loves her, Elihas pulls Widow to safety, and they kiss. The two team up to retrieve an emergency kill-switch from Orion that Elihas created as a precaution against the super-soldiers. Hawkeye, Iron Man, Thor, War Machine and Captain Marvel arrive and breach the auction hall. Together with Punisher, Hulk, and Amadeus, they battle the Leviathan troops. Widow and Elihas confront Orion, gain control of the switch and activate it, disabling all the active bio-soldiers. Punisher attempts to shoot Elihas, which distracts Widow who is still fighting Orion. Orion fires a fatal blast at her, but Elihas jumps in the way and is hit instead. Punisher kills Orion and Elihas dies in Widow's arms.

Fury orders Widow to arrest Punisher, who faces a life sentence for killing Orion. She instead releases him once Fury leaves, having accepted Punisher's way of imparting justice. In Miami, Punisher tracks down Cain and kills him.

== Cast ==
Role	Japanese voice actor	English dubbing actor
Natasha Romanoff / Black Widow	Miyuki Sawashiro	Jennifer Carpenter
Frank Castle / Punisher	Tesshō Genda	Brian Bloom
Elihas Starr / Egghead	Hiroki Tōchi	Grant George
Orion	Masashi Sugawara	JB Blanc
Cain	Ryūzaburō Ōtomo	Kyle Hebert
Tony Stark / Iron Man	Keiji Fujiwara	Matthew Mercer
Amadeus Cho	Daisuke Namikawa	Eric Bauza
Maria Hill	Junko Minagawa	Kari Wahlgren
Clint Barton / Hawkeye	Shūhei Sakaguchi	Matthew Mercer
Bruce Banner / Hulk	Yuichi Karasuma	Fred Tatasciore
Ren	Hisashi Izumi	Fred Tatasciore
Nick Fury	Hideaki Tezuka	John Eric Bentley

In addition, Thor, War Machine, Captain Marvel, Grim Reaper, Graviton, Griffin, Taskmaster, Count Nefaria, and Helmut Zemo also appear in uncredited roles.

== Crew ==
- Jamie Simone – Casting and voice director

== Featurettes ==
The discs contains two featurettes: "Espionage and Punishment" and "The Vigilante Vs. The Spy", while the Blu-ray features an additional bonus, the Conceptual Art Gallery. "Espionage and Punishment" shows the adaptation of the characters to anime and a "making of" film including early concept art and storyboards. "The Vigilante Vs. The Spy" profiles Frank Castle (The Punisher) and Natasha Romanoff (Black Widow).

== Reception ==
IGN awarded Avengers Confidential: Black Widow & Punisher a score of 8 out of 10, saying "Avengers Confidential: Black Widow and Punisher is a complex and effective animated offering from Marvel." Den of Geek awarded it a more negative score of 2 out of 5, criticising the dialogue and characterisation but praising the fight scenes.

The film earned $723,507 from domestic DVD sales and $635,698 from domestic Blu-ray sales, bringing its total domestic home video sales to $1,359,205.
