= Ant-Man (TV series) =

- Genre: Superhero
- Based on: Ant-Man by: Stan Lee; Larry Lieber; Jack Kirby
- Written by: Brian Wisol
- Directed by: Ugo Bienvenu; Kevin Manach
- Voices of: Josh Keaton; Melissa Rauch; Dee Bradley Baker; William Salyers; Laura Bailey; Eric Bauza; Nolan North; Sam Riegel; Fred Tatasciore
- Country of origin: United States
- Original language: English
- No. of seasons: 1
- No. of episodes: 6

Production
- Executive producers: Alan Fine; Dan Buckley; Joe Quesada; Cort Lane
- Producers: Marc Bodin-Joyeux; Cara Speller
- Running time: 1 minute
- Production companies: Passion Animation Studios; Marvel Animation

Original release
- Network: Disney XD
- Release: June 10 – June 11, 2017

Marvel's Ant-Man, also known as Ant-Man, is an American animated series of shorts based on comics published by Marvel Comics, featuring the character Scott Lang / Ant-Man. The series was created by Passion Studios' Ugo Bienvenu and Kevin Manach. Josh Keaton voices Ant-Man while Melissa Rauch voices The Wasp. It premiered on June 10, 2017 on Disney XD.

== Plot ==
Scott Lang / Ant-Man fights with his enemies such as Yellowjacket, Whirlwind, Egghead and miniature alien invasions with the help of Wasp and Hank Pym.

== Characters ==
- Scott Lang / Ant-Man (voiced by Josh Keaton)
- Wasp (voiced by Melissa Rauch)
- Hank Pym (voiced by Dee Bradley Baker)
- Yellowjacket (voiced by William Salyers)
- Cassie Lang (voiced by Laura Bailey)
- Alien Leader (voiced by Eric Bauza)
- Exterminator (voiced by Nolan North)
- Egghead (voiced by Sam Riegel)
- Whirlwind (voiced by Fred Tatasciore)

== Episodes ==
No. overall	No. in season	Title	Directed by	Written by	Original release date	Prod. code	US viewers (millions)
1	1	"Science Fair"	Ugo Bienvenu Kevin Manach	Brian Wisol	June 10, 2017	TBA	N/A
2	2	"Alien Invasion"	Ugo Bienvenu Kevin Manach	Brian Wisol	June 10, 2017	TBA	N/A
3	3	"Soup Time"	Ugo Bienvenu Kevin Manach	Brian Wisol	June 10, 2017	TBA	N/A
4	4	"Exterminator"	Ugo Bienvenu Kevin Manach	Brian Wisol	June 11, 2017	TBA	N/A
5	5	"Proton Cube"	Ugo Bienvenu Kevin Manach	Brian Wisol	June 11, 2017	TBA	N/A
6	6	"Not a Date"	Ugo Bienvenu Kevin Manach	Brian Wisol	June 11, 2017	TBA	N/A

== Reception ==
=== Critical response ===
Kwame Opam of The Verge found that Marvel's Ant-Man captures Ant-Man's "quirkiness perfectly," writing, "The shorts have a Silver Age, Jack Kirby-esque feel to them, thanks to the sharp animation style and Lang’s constant quips. Lang is a natural swashbuckler here." Bradley Prom of Screen Rant included Marvel's Ant-Man in their "9 Best Superhero Shorts Like I Am Groot" list, saying,, Many of the best shorts implement some unique artistic styles and designs. That’s certainly the case for Ant-Man as its looks more like a visual comic book than other animated series. [...] There are only six episodes of this short-lived series, with each only being around two minutes long, but there surely could have been more given the quality and comedic elements. "
