= Giant-Man =

- Raz Malhotra as Giant-Man: The Astonishing Ant-Man #5. Cover art by Mark Brooks

Publication information
- Publisher: Marvel Comics
- First appearance: Tales to Astonish #49 (November 1963)
- Created by: Stan Lee; Jack Kirby

In-story information
- Alter ego: Hank Pym; Bill Foster; Raz Malhotra; Scott Lang
- Team affiliations: Avengers; Agents of Atlas
- Abilities: Leading authority in myrmecology research Size-shifting from nearly microscopic to ~100 feet gigantic (both at extremes); Telepathic insect communication Superhuman strength

Giant-Man is the alias used by several superheroes appearing in American comic books published by Marvel Comics, usually in association with the alias Ant-Man. Hank Pym first appeared as Giant-Man in Tales to Astonish #49, though he had appeared multiple times before, first in #27 as a civilian, and in #35 as Ant-Man. Regardless of iteration, Giant-Man usually has the power to enlarge to enormous sizes. Giant-Man also frequently overlaps with the alias Goliath.

The Scott Lang incarnation of Giant-Man has appeared in films set in the Marvel Cinematic Universe, portrayed by Paul Rudd. The Hank Pym incarnation of Giant-Man has appeared in a number of animated series, including The Avengers: Earth's Mightiest Heroes.

== Publication history ==
Hank Pym, the first Giant-Man, with the Wasp, appeared in many superheroes stories published in the serial Tales to Astonish and later, The Avengers.

Bill Foster later became the second Giant-Man and the Black Goliath.

Raz Malhotra debuted in The Astonishing Ant-Man #4 as the third Giant-Man and later as one of the supporting characters of the regular series, joining Scott Lang's Ant-Man Security Solutions.

== Fictional character biography ==
=== Hank Pym ===
Henry "Hank" Pym was the original version of Giant-Man. He used the super hero identity after joining the Avengers with the Wasp, Iron Man, Thor and the Hulk. He has also used other aliases like Ant-Man, Goliath, Yellowjacket, and Wasp.

=== Bill Foster ===
William "Bill" Foster was the second version of Giant-Man who originally went by Black Goliath.

=== Criti Noll ===
The Skrull Criti Noll utilized the abilities of Hank Pym / Giant-Man during the Secret Invasion storyline.

=== Raz Malhotra ===
Raz Malhotra is the third major version of Giant-Man. The character, created by Nick Spencer and Brent Schoonover, first appeared in Ant-Man Annual #1 (July 2015). He is an Indian American computer technician who was working in artificial intelligence at a time when Hank Pym intended to rid Earth of AIs. Lured by the supervillain Egghead, Malhotra frees himself from Egghead's control with the help of Pym. Some time after Pym's apparent death, Scott Lang gives Malhotra a Giant-Man uniform.

During the Secret Empire storyline, Malhotra as Giant-Man appears as part of a resistance against Hydra after Hydra takes control of the United States. When Hydra agents threaten his parents and his sisters Preeti and Swapna, Malhotra defeats the agents and gets his family to safety.

After he is summoned to the portal city of Pan, Giant-Man joins the New Agents of Atlas to help protect the newly formed city. He later begins a relationship with Isaac Ikeda, the "Protector of Pan".

=== Scott Lang ===
Scott Lang is the second major version of Giant-Man in the Ultimate Marvel universe.

=== Giant-Men ===
The Ultimate Marvel universe features the Giant-Men, a group of characters who have size-shifting powers and special jumpsuits that can grow with them. The Giant-Men are reserve members of S.H.I.E.L.D. and consist of Giant-Men (such as David Scotty and Peter) as well as the alternately named Goliaths and Giant-Women.

== In other media ==
=== Television ===
- The Hank Pym incarnation of Giant-Man appears in The Marvel Super Heroes, voiced by Tom Harvey.
- The Hank Pym incarnation of Giant-Man appears in The Avengers: United They Stand, voiced by Rod Wilson.
- The Hank Pym incarnation of Giant-Man appears in The Avengers: Earth's Mightiest Heroes, voiced by Wally Wingert.
- The Hank Pym incarnation of Giant-Man appears in Marvel Disk Wars: The Avengers, voiced by Yasunori Masutani.
- The Scott Lang incarnation of Giant-Man appears in Iron Man and His Awesome Friends, voiced by Christopher Riley.

=== Film ===
- The Hank Pym incarnation of Giant-Man appears in the Marvel Animated Features series of films, voiced by Nolan North.
  - The Ultimate Marvel incarnation of Pym appears in Ultimate Avengers and Ultimate Avengers 2 as a member of the titular team.
  - Pym makes a non-speaking appearance in Next Avengers: Heroes of Tomorrow.

=== Marvel Cinematic Universe ===
Paul Rudd as Scott Lang / Giant-Man in Captain America: Civil War.

- The Scott Lang incarnation of Giant-Man appears in films set in the Marvel Cinematic Universe, portrayed by Paul Rudd. Lang utilizes his Giant-Man form in Captain America: Civil War (2016), Ant-Man and the Wasp (2018), Avengers: Endgame (2019), and Ant-Man and the Wasp: Quantumania (2023).
  - An unidentified Giant-Man appears in Deadpool & Wolverine (2024) as a corpse that Cassandra Nova converted into her lair.
- The Bill Foster incarnation of Giant-Man does not appear explicitly in the Marvel Cinematic Universe, but he appears as a character portrayed by Laurence Fishburne, who had previously worked with Hank Pym on a Project Goliath. In Ant-Man and the Wasp (2018), he stated that the largest size he had gotten to was 21 feet.

=== Video games ===
- The Hank Pym incarnation of Giant-Man appears as an assist character in Avengers in Galactic Storm.
- The Hank Pym incarnation of Giant-Man appears as a playable character in Marvel Super Hero Squad Online.
- The Hank Pym incarnation of Giant-Man appears as a playable character in Marvel: Future Fight.
- The Hank Pym and Raz Malhotra incarnations of Giant-Man appear as playable characters in Lego Marvel Super Heroes 2, with the former voiced by Dar Dash and the latter appearing as DLC.

== See also ==
- Goliath (Marvel Comics), another alias also used by Pym and Foster
