= Ant-Man =

Comic book superhero

- Mitchell Carson and Eric O'Grady on the cover of Irredeemable Ant-Man vol. 1 #5 (April 2007). Art by Phil Hester

Publication information
- Publisher: Marvel Comics
- First appearance: Tales to Astonish #27 (January 1962) (as Dr. Henry Pym); Tales to Astonish #35 (September 1962) (as Ant-Man)
- Created by: Stan Lee (co-creator); Larry Lieber (writer); Jack Kirby (co-creator, writer)

In-story information
- Alter ego: Hank Pym; Scott Lang; Eric O'Grady; Chris McCarthy; Zayn Asghar
- Team affiliations: Avengers
- Abilities: Superhuman strength and agility; Leading authority in myrmecology research; Size-shifting from nearly microscopic to ~100 feet gigantic (both at extremes); Maintains strength of normal size in shrunken state; Telepathic communication with ants via cybernetic helmet

Ant-Man is the name of several superheroes appearing in books published by Marvel Comics, all of whom can shrink to the size of an ant and usually have telepathic control over ants.

== Publication history ==
Created by Stan Lee, Larry Lieber and Jack Kirby, Dr. Henry Pym made his first appearance in Tales to Astonish #27 (January 1962); he assumed his Ant-Man identity in his second appearance, in Tales to Astonish #35 (September 1962). Reformed thieves Scott Lang and Eric O'Grady also took on the Ant-Man mantle after Pym changed his superhero identity to various other aliases, such as Giant-Man, Goliath, and Yellowjacket. Pym's Ant-Man is a founding member of the super hero team known as the Avengers.

== Fictional character biography ==
Over the years, a number of different characters have assumed the title of Ant-Man; most of them have been connected with the Avengers.

=== Hank Pym ===
Dr. Henry "Hank" Pym was a biophysicist and security operations center expert who decided to become the original Ant-Man after the death of his first wife Maria Trovaya who had been a political dissident in Hungary. Falling in love with him and believing that his American citizenship would protect her, Maria traveled with Hank to Hungary shortly after their marriage to start their new life together. Unfortunately they were confronted by corrupt agents of the secret police. Hank was knocked unconscious and Maria was murdered. Pym was greatly distraught by his wife's death, and decided to do whatever he could in the future to battle injustice. Originally, he changed his stature by inhaling a shrinking gas; this soon evolved into a size-changing pill, and later into the use of what he called Pym Particles. He armed himself with a helmet that could control ants. Pym would shrink down to the size of an insect as the mystery-solving Ant-Man, solving crimes and stopping criminals. He soon shared his discovery with the woman who would become his second wife, Janet van Dyne, who became his crime-fighting partner Wasp after he helped Janet avenge the death of her scientist father Vernon van Dyne. The duo would be founding members of the Avengers, fighting recurring enemies such as the mad scientist Egghead, the mutant Whirlwind, and Pym's own robotic creation Ultron. While Pym is the original Ant-Man, he eventually acquired the power to grow in size as well as shrink, and adopted other aliases over the years such as Giant-Man, Goliath, Yellowjacket, and Wasp as a tribute to Janet after her presumed death in Secret Invasion. His successors have taken up the Ant-Man role while Pym explored these other identities.

=== Scott Lang ===
Scott Lang was a thief who decided to be the second Ant-Man after stealing the Ant-Man suit to save his daughter Cassandra "Cassie" Lang from a heart condition. Reforming from his life of crime, Lang soon took on a full-time career as Ant-Man with the encouragement of Hank Pym. He became an affiliate of the Fantastic Four and later became a full-time member of the Avengers. For a period of time he dated Jessica Jones. He was killed by the Scarlet Witch along with the Vision and Hawkeye in Avengers Disassembled, and his daughter took up his heroic mantle as Stature in the book Young Avengers. He returned to life in 2011 in the miniseries The Children's Crusade.

=== Chris McCarthy ===
Chris McCarthy was the third character to take up the Ant-Man title albeit briefly, serving only as a plot point to get the Ant-Man suit to Eric O'Grady. The character, created by Robert Kirkman and Phil Hester, first appeared in Civil War: Choosing Sides #1 (October 2006). A low level agent of S.H.I.E.L.D. working on the Helicarrier, McCarthy was tasked with guarding Hank Pym's lab. After panicking and accidentally knocked Pym unconscious, he found the most recent Ant-Man suit which he promptly used to shrink, getting lost. McCarthy was caught up when a group of Hydra superhumans attacked and was killed in the chaos.

=== Eric O'Grady ===
Eric O'Grady was the fourth character to take up the Ant-Man title. O'Grady is a low-level agent of S.H.I.E.L.D. who stumbles upon the Ant-Man suit. A man of few morals and willing to lie, cheat, steal and manipulate in order to get ahead in life, O'Grady stole the armor for his own selfish plans, which included using his status as a "super-hero" to seduce women, as well as humiliate and torment others. He had his own short-lived title before being part of other teams such as joining Avengers: The Initiative as his first team and then joining the Thunderbolts before the character perished heroically while defending a child against the villain known as Father.

=== Criti Noll ===
Criti Noll was a Skrull who impersonated Hank Pym / Ant-Man during occasions before the Secret Invasion storyline.

=== Zayn Asghar ===
Dr. Zayn Asghar operates as the Earth-14831 equivalent of Ant-Man in the year 2549. The character, created by Al Ewing and Tom Reilly, first appeared in Ant-Man Vol. 3 #1 (July 2022). Born to eco-scientists working to repair the damage to Earth caused by All-Father Ultron in Ultron Forever, he developing an obsession with redeeming Hank Pym, Ultron's creator, and created the Nano Ant Swarm which he used to fight paleo-capitalists and disaster opportunists as Ant-Man. Dr. Asghar began cloning thousands of extinct ant species to restore his world's climate, but these ants lacked the evolved instincts of the insects. Using Doctor Doom's Time Platform, he returns to the time periods of the three previous Ant-Men to study their methods of insect control to synthesize artificial instincts for his ants, briefly interacting with each of his contemporaries. Dr. Asghar's tampering with time resulted in All-Father Ultron finding a way to return to the Earth he once conquered. Zayn pulls Pym, Eric O'Grady, and Scott Lang to his time. Using Time Master's aging ray that was brought to the future by Lang, Zayn removes the artificial aging that turned Ultron into the All-Father, causing him to vanish to parts unknown.

== In other media ==
=== Television ===
- The Hank Pym incarnation of Ant-Man appears in a 1979 sketch in Saturday Night Live, portrayed by Garrett Morris.
- An Ant-Man TV series was one of several planned from Marvel in the 1980s.
- The Hank Pym incarnation of Ant-Man appears in Avengers: United They Stand, voiced by Rod Wilson.
- The Hank Pym incarnation of Ant-Man appears in Fantastic Four: World's Greatest Heroes, voiced by John Payne.
- The Hank Pym incarnation of Ant-Man appears in The Super Hero Squad Show, voiced by Greg Grunberg.
- The Hank Pym and Scott Lang incarnations of Ant-Man appear in The Avengers: Earth's Mightiest Heroes, voiced by Wally Wingert and Crispin Freeman respectively.
- The Scott Lang incarnation of Ant-Man, with elements of Hank Pym and Eric O'Grady, appears in Avengers Assemble, voiced by Grant George and Josh Keaton.
- The Scott Lang incarnation of Ant-Man appears in Ultimate Spider-Man.
- The Scott Lang incarnation of Ant-Man appears in Lego Marvel Super Heroes: Avengers Reassembled.
- The Scott Lang incarnation of Ant-Man appears in Guardians of the Galaxy.
- The Scott Lang incarnation of Ant-Man appears in Ant-Man (2017).
- The Scott Lang incarnation of Ant-Man appears in Marvel Super Hero Adventures, voiced by Adrian Petriw.
- An unidentified incarnation of Ant-Man, based on the MCU incarnation of Scott Lang, makes a non-speaking cameo appearance in the Moon Girl and Devil Dinosaur episode "Today, I Am a Woman".
- The Hank Pym incarnation of Ant-Man, with elements of Scott Lang, appears in Spidey and His Amazing Friends, voiced by Sean Giambrone.
- The Scott Lang incarnation of Ant-Man appears in Lego Marvel Avengers: Time Twisted, voiced by Ian Hanlin.

=== Marvel Cinematic Universe ===
Paul Rudd and Michael Douglas portray Scott Lang and Hank Pym respectively in media set in the Marvel Cinematic Universe. Both have appeared in the live-action films Ant-Man (2015), Captain America: Civil War (2016), Ant-Man and the Wasp (2018), Avengers: Endgame (2019) and Ant-Man and the Wasp: Quantumania (2023). while alternate timeline variants of Lang and Pym appear in the Disney+ animated series What If...?.

=== Video games ===
- An unidentified incarnation of Ant-Man appears as a purchasable outfit in Fortnite Battle Royale.
- The Scott Lang and Hank Pym incarnations of Ant-Man appears as playable characters in Lego Marvel's Avengers. Additionally, downloadable content based on the MCU Ant-Man film was released in a later update.
- The Zayn Asghar incarnation of Ant-Man appears in Marvel Contest of Champions.

== See also ==
- Atom (character), a DC Comics superhero with a similar ability to shrink in size
