= Hank Pym =

Comic book superhero

- The character's alter egos (front to back) as depicted in Age of Ultron #10 (June 2013): Ant-Man, Hank Pym, Goliath, Yellowjacket, and Giant-Man (not all to scale), with Ultron in the background. Art by Paolo Rivera.

Publication information
- Publisher: Marvel Comics
- First appearance: As Hank Pym: Tales to Astonish #27 (January 1962); As Ant-Man: Tales to Astonish #35 (September 1962); As Giant-Man: Tales to Astonish #49 (November 1963); As Goliath: The Avengers #28 (May 1966); As Yellowjacket: The Avengers #59 (December 1968); As Wasp: Secret Invasion: Requiem #1 (February 2009); As Ultron: Avengers: Rage of Ultron #1 (April 2015)
- Created by: Stan Lee (co-writer/editor); Larry Lieber (co-writer); Jack Kirby (artist)

In-story information
- Full name: Dr. Henry Jonathan Pym
- Species: Human mutate
- Place of origin: Nebraska
- Team affiliations: Avengers; West Coast Avengers; Mighty Avengers; Secret Defenders; Defenders; Avengers Academy; Secret Avengers; Avengers A.I.; Illuminati
- Partnerships: Wasp
- Notable aliases: Ant-Man; Giant-Man; Goliath; Yellowjacket; Wasp; Scientist Supreme; Ultron
- Abilities: Genius-level intellect; Expert biochemist and myrmecologist; Superhuman strength, stamina, durability and mass in giant form (as Giant-Man, Goliath and Yellowjacket); Bio-Energy Projection, also known as a Bio-Sting (particularly during his periods as Ant-Man and Yellowjacket); Telepathic communication with ants via cybernetic helmet (as Ant-Man); Size-shifting from nearly microscopic to ~100 feet gigantic (both at extremes); Flight using grafted wings (as Yellowjacket); Ability to transfer his size-shifting ability to other beings and objects; Maintains strength of normal size in shrunken state

Dr. Henry Jonathan Pym is a character appearing in American comic books published by Marvel Comics. Created by penciller Jack Kirby, editor-plotter Stan Lee and writer Larry Lieber, Pym debuted in Tales to Astonish #27 (January 1962). He returned several issues later as the original iteration of Ant-Man, a superhero with the power to shrink to the size of an ant. He later assumed other superhero identities, including the size-changing Giant-Man and Goliath; the insect-themed Yellowjacket; and briefly, the Wasp. He is a founding member of the Avengers superhero team, and the creator of the robotic villain Ultron. He is also the ex-husband of Janet van Dyne, the first Wasp, and the father of Nadia van Dyne, his daughter by his first wife, Maria Pym.

Since his earliest appearances in the Silver Age of Comic Books, Pym has been featured in various Marvel-endorsed products including animated films, video games, television series, and feature films. Michael Douglas plays Pym in the Marvel Cinematic Universe films Ant-Man (2015), Ant-Man and the Wasp (2018), Avengers: Endgame (2019), and Ant-Man and the Wasp: Quantumania (2023). Douglas also voiced alternate-timeline versions of Pym in the Disney+ animated series What If...? (2021–2023).

== Publication history ==
Hank Pym debuted in a seven-page solo cover story, "The Man in the Ant Hill", about a character who tests shrinking technology on himself, in the science fiction/fantasy anthology Tales to Astonish #27 (cover date January 1962). The story was created by editor-plotter Stan Lee, writer Larry Lieber, penciller Jack Kirby, and inker Dick Ayers. In a 2008 interview, Lee said: "I did one comic book called 'The Man in the Ant Hill' about a guy who shrunk down and there were ants or bees chasing him. That sold so well that I thought making him into a superhero might be fun."

As a result, Pym was revived eight issues later as the costumed superhero Ant-Man who starred in a 13-page, three-chapter story "Return of the Ant-Man/An Army of Ants/The Ant-Man's Revenge" in Tales to Astonish #35 (September 1962). His adventures became an ongoing feature in the title. Issue #44 (June 1963) featured the debut of his socialite girlfriend and lab assistant Janet van Dyne, who adopted the costumed identity of the Wasp. She co-starred in Pym's subsequent appearances, and was a framing-sequence host for backup stories in the series. In September 1963, Lee and Kirby created the superhero title The Avengers, and Ant-Man and Wasp were established in issue #1 as founding members of the eponymous team.

Decades later, Lee theorized as to why "Ant-Man never became one of our top sellers or had his own book":

I loved Ant-Man, but the stories were never really successful. In order for Ant-Man to be successful, he had to be drawn this small next to big things and you would be getting pictures that were visually interesting. The artists who drew him, no matter how much I kept reminding them, they kept forgetting that fact. They would draw him standing on a tabletop and they would draw a heroic-looking guy. I would say, 'Draw a matchbook cover next to him, so we see the difference in size.' But they kept forgetting. So when you would look at the panels, you thought you were looking at a normal guy wearing an underwear costume like all of them. It didn't have the interest.

Pym began a continuous shift of superhero identities in Tales to Astonish, first becoming the 12 ft-tall (3.7 m) Giant-Man in issue #49 (November 1963). Pym and van Dyne continued to costar in the title until issue #69 (July 1965), while simultaneously appearing in The Avengers until issue #15 (April 1965), after which they temporarily left the team.

Next Pym rejoined the Avengers and adopted the new identity Goliath in Avengers #28 (May 1966). Gradually falling to mental strain, he adopted the fourth superhero identity Yellowjacket in issue #59 (December 1968). He reappeared as Ant-Man in Avengers #93 (November 1971); and for issues #4–10 starred in the lead story of the first volume of Marvel Feature (July 1972 – July 1973). During this run, he appeared in a redesigned costume with a nail as a weapon. After appearing occasionally as Yellowjacket in the 1980s and battling mental and emotional issues, he temporarily abandoned costumed personas altogether, joining the West Coast Avengers as a scientist and inventor in West Coast Avengers vol. 2, #21 (June 1987). Writer Steve Englehart explained, "I've been using him as he asked to be used. In the Egghead story, where he bombed out as Yellowjacket, he said that he would never be a superhero again, so I took him at his word."

Pym returned to the Avengers as Giant-Man in The Avengers vol. 3, #1 (February 1998). When the team disbanded after a series of tragedies, Pym, as Yellowjacket, took a leave of absence beginning with vol. 3, #85 (September 2004).

Following van Dyne's death, a grieving Pym took on the Wasp identity as a tribute to her in the one-shot publication Secret Invasion: Requiem (January 2009). Giant-Man appeared as a supporting character in Avengers Academy from issue #1 (August 2010) through its final issue #39 (January 2013). Pym returned as the Wasp in the mini-series Ant-Man & The Wasp (January 2011) and as a regular character in the 2010-2013 Secret Avengers series from issue #22 (April 2012) through its final issue #37 (March 2013).

After Secret Avengers, Pym joined the Avengers A.I. after beating his creation Ultron. He then appeared in many comics including Daredevil (Vol. 3 and 4) and the graphic novel Rage of Ultron.

== Fictional character biography ==
=== 1960s ===
Biochemist Dr. Henry "Hank" Pym discovers an unusual set of subatomic particles he labels "Pym particles". Entrapping them within two separate serums, he creates a size-altering formula and a reversal formula, testing them on himself. Reduced to the size of an insect, he becomes trapped in an anthill before he eventually escapes and uses the reversal formula to return to normal size. Deciding the serums are too dangerous, he destroys them. He later reconsiders his decision and recreates his serums. Pym's experience in the anthill inspires him to study ants, and he builds a cybernetic helmet that lets him communicate with and control them. He designs a costume made of unstable molecules to prevent bites or scratches from the ants and reinvents himself as the superhero Ant-Man.

After several adventures, Pym is contacted by Vernon van Dyne, who asks for his help contacting alien life. Pym refuses, but is attracted to Vernon's socialite daughter Janet van Dyne. When Vernon is killed by an alien criminal who teleports to Earth, Janet asks for Pym's help avenging his death. Pym reveals his secret identity to Janet and uses Pym particles to graft wasp wings beneath her shoulders, which appear when Janet shrinks. She assumes the alias of the Wasp, and together they find and defeat Vernon's killer. They become founding members of the superhero team the Avengers.

Pym eventually adopts his first alternate identity as the 12-foot-tall Giant-Man. (Three decades later, a flashback shows him adopting the identity out of feelings of inadequacy when compared to powerful teammates Iron Man and Thor.) Pym and the Wasp begin a romantic relationship, and soon take a leave of absence from the Avengers.

Returning to the Avengers, Pym adopts a new superhero identity, Goliath. A mishap traps him in giant form for several issues and affects his self-esteem. After recovering his size-shifting powers, he creates the robot Ultron that unexpectedly achieves sentience and becomes one of the Avengers's greatest foes. During a botched experiment, Pym inhales chemicals that affect his mind, and he reappears at Avengers Mansion in the cocky new persona of Yellowjacket, claiming to have disposed of Pym. The Wasp secretly realizes he is Pym, however, and accepts his offer of marriage. At their wedding, a battle with the Circus of Crime erupts; in the ensuing conflict, the chemicals lose their effect on him and his identity is restored.

=== 1970s ===
After several adventures with the Avengers, including another encounter with Ultron, the pair take another leave of absence. The heroes re-encounter Hank Pym at the beginning of the Kree-Skrull War, and once again as the Ant-Man persona and has a series of solo adventures.

After aiding fellow superhero team known as the Defenders as Yellowjacket, Pym returns to the Avengers. He is eventually captured by an upgraded Ultron that brainwashes his creator, causing the character to regress to his original Ant-Man costume and personality — arriving at Avengers Mansion, thinking it to be the very first meeting of the team. Seeing several unfamiliar members, Pym attacks the team until stopped by the Wasp. After Ultron's brainwashing is reversed, Pym rejoins the Avengers as Yellowjacket. Pym is forced to briefly leave the team when the roster is restructured by government liaison Henry Peter Gyrich.

Also at this time, he noticed Scott Lang's theft of the Ant-Man suit. After Darren Cross's defeat and aware of Lang's use of the stolen goods, Pym let Lang keep the equipment, albeit only to uphold the law.

=== 1980s ===
Hank Pym strikes his wife Janet van Dyne in Avengers #213 (November 1981). Art by Bob Hall.

Returning 14 issues later, Hank Pym participates in several missions until, after demonstrating hostile behavior toward Janet van Dyne, he attacks a foe from behind once the opponent had ceased fighting. Captain America suspends Yellowjacket from Avengers duty pending the verdict of a court-martial.

Pym suffers a mental breakdown and concocts a plan to salvage his credibility. He plans to build the robot Salvation to launch an attack on the Avengers; Pym will then counter the false flag attack at a critical moment using his knowledge of the robot's weaknesses, thereby presenting himself as the other Avengers' savior. The Wasp discovers the plan and begs Pym to stop, whereupon he strikes her. (Note: Jim Shooter, the writer of this story, stated in 2011 on his personal web site that he intended only that Pym accidentally strike his wife while gesturing at her dismissively, and that artist Bob Hall misinterpreted the instruction.)

Pym is subsequently expelled from the Avengers, and Janet divorces him.

Left penniless, Pym is manipulated by an old foe, the presumed-dead Egghead, who tricks Pym into stealing the national reserve of the metal adamantium. Pym is confronted by the Avengers and blamed for the theft, as Egghead erases all evidence of his own involvement. Pym, in turn, blames Egghead, a criminal still believed dead by the other Avengers. This is taken by Pym's former teammates as further proof of his madness, and he is incarcerated. During Pym's imprisonment, Janet has a brief relationship with Tony Stark. Egghead later attempts to kill Pym but is himself accidentally killed by Hawkeye. With the perpetrator of the original theft now exposed, Pym is cleared of all charges. After bidding farewell to Janet and his teammates, Pym leaves to devote himself full-time to research.

Pym reappears as a member of the West Coast Avengers, first in an advisory role, then as a full member. He answers to "Doctor Pym" in the field, using none of the names or costumes associated with his previous superhero identities. He begins a short relationship with teammate Tigra. After being taunted by old foe Whirlwind, Pym contemplates suicide, but is stopped by Firebird. Pym and Janet eventually resume a romantic relationship.

=== 1990s ===
The character returns to the Avengers, joining the East Coast team as Giant-Man. The pair, together with many of the other Avengers, apparently sacrifice themselves to stop the villain Onslaught, but actually exist in a pocket universe for a year before returning to the mainstream Marvel Universe.

Hank Pym returns and aids the team as Giant-Man, and makes a significant contribution by defeating criminal mastermind Imus Champion and his flawed creation Ultron, simultaneously overcoming his old issues of guilt over Ultron's crimes.

=== 2000s ===
During the Destiny War between Kang the Conqueror and Immortus, two versions of Hank Pym are drawn in: Giant-Man of the present and Yellowjacket immediately prior to his marriage to Janet van Dyne. Yellowjacket briefly betrays the team to Immortus and the powerful Time-Keepers try to create a timeline where he will not turn back into Pym, but he rejects this decision in time to help his allies. Observing the final battle, Libra—who brought the team together by using the Destiny Force to tap into his subconscious awareness of the cosmic balance—reflects that both Pyms were necessary so that Yellowjacket's betrayal could bring the team into the right position to attack the Time-Keepers, while Pym's presence as Giant-Man both provided a stable support and irritated Yellowjacket to provoke his own actions.

Back in the present, an encounter with Kulan Gath results in Pym being split into his two personas of Pym and Yellowjacket, after a spell cast by Gath temporarily transforms Pym into a swashbuckler-style Yellowjacket, followed by the Yellowjacket persona manifesting a physical presence from the extradimensional bio-mass Pym uses to grow. Yellowjacket's stability deteriorates in a confrontation with Diablo. The two personalities are restored when the Wasp helps the two halves realize they need each other. Pym is eventually able to resolve his problems and adopts his Yellowjacket persona again.

After the events of the "Avengers Disassembled" storyline, Pym takes a leave of absence, and in the one-shot Avengers: Finale, he and Janet leave for England to rekindle their relationship.

As Yellowjacket, Pym is a central character in the Civil War storyline, joining those heroes that support the Superhuman Registration Act. At the conclusion of the Civil War, Pym is named "Man of the Year" by Time magazine for his role in freeing several captive anti-registration heroes. Pym becomes one of the administrators at Camp Hammond, a U.S. military base in Stamford, Connecticut, for the training of registered superheroes in the government program The Initiative. Pym and Janet's relationship fails, and Pym again begins a romantic relationship with teammate Tigra.

Following the publication of Civil War, Marvel's Secret Invasion storyline uses flashbacks to present the then-current version of the character as an impostor who replaced the real Pym at some point in the books' fictional history prior to the events of Civil War. This impostor is an extraterrestrial of the shape-shifting Skrull race participating in a covert invasion of Earth; Pym's experiences throughout the Civil War series and related series are retold in brief from the perspective of the impostor and its allies. The impostor is exposed and defeated by the hero Crusader. After the final battle between Earth's heroes and the Skrulls, Pym is found with other "replaced" heroes in a Skrull vessel. When Janet is seemingly killed in battle, Pym takes on a new superhero persona, the Wasp, in tribute to her. He rejoins the Avengers and eventually leads the team.

The cosmic entity Eternity reveals to Pym that he is Earth's "Scientist Supreme", the scientific counterpart to Earth's Sorcerer Supreme. The Norse trickster-god Loki later claims to have been posing as Eternity to manipulate Pym.

=== 2010s ===
Hank Pym creates Avengers Academy, a program to help train young people with newly acquired superpowers. He returns to his Giant-Man identity, and later joins the superhero team: Secret Avengers. In the "Age of Ultron" storyline, Pym travels through time to destroy his robot, Ultron, who had managed to conquer the world.

In another adventure, Pym and Monica Chang, A.I. Division Chief of the espionage agency S.H.I.E.L.D., assemble a new team called the Avengers A.I. A few months later, Pym, using his Yellowjacket identity, is shown as a member of the Illuminati. At one point, Pym is presumed dead and a funeral service is held in his honor. Scott Lang receives one of Pym's labs according to the will.

Pym resurfaces in a space adventure before rejoining the Avengers on Earth, though it becomes clear that Ultron is actually controlling Hank's body. The Avengers defeat the hybrid robot, but both Hank and Ultron survive and continue to do battle with one another internally. Later in this period, Hank's daughter Nadia is introduced. It is also revealed that Hank has bipolar disorder, which he has been monitoring on his own to predict when and how often his mood swings may occur.

During the "Secret Empire" storyline, Pym sets up a base in Alaska and is forced to work through some family issues and relationship strife within the Avengers team. Pym later goes on a journey to collect all the Infinity Stones. During this storyline, a piece of Hank's soul gets stuck in an alternate realm and eventually devoured. In another storyline, Hank is portrayed as a villain in a battle against the Silver Surfer.

In "The Ultron Agenda" storyline, Hank attempts to merge all robots with humans. Iron Man and Machine Man interfere with his plans and Pym attempts to take revenge. At the end of this storyline, it is revealed that Hank's human side has been dead since he first merged with Ultron.

=== 2020s ===
The Ant-Man miniseries released in 2022 depicts an early Hank Pym being pulled into the future, along with Eric O'Grady and Scott Lang, in an attempt to assist the Ant-Man of the 25th century, Zayn Asghar. Ultron is ultimately defeated and the other Ant-Men are returned to the past.

Some time later, an old man claiming to be Hank Pym places an artificial personality in Whirlwind's corpse called "Victor Shade". It was later revealed that a fragment of Pym's consciousness had separated from All-Father Ultron when he was defeated. The fragment recreated his body which appeared older and he was still paranoid from his time under Ultron's control. What Pym did to Whirlwind was part of an experiment involving killing and reviving villains into becoming members of his Lethal Legion with help from Black Ant. The "Victor Shade" persona is hijacked by Ultron-12, who takes over the Lethal Legion. After Ultron is defeated, Pym states that Ultron is not gone for good and leaves with the Lethal Legion to prepare for Ultron's return.

== Powers and abilities ==
Hank Pym is a scientific genius with PhDs in biochemistry and nanotechnology and expertise in the fields of quantum physics, robotics/cybernetics, artificial intelligence, and entomology. Pym discovered the subatomic "Pym particles" that enable mass to be shunted or gained from an alternate dimension, thereby changing the size of himself or other beings or objects. Pym is the creator of the robot Ultron, whom he created as an experiment after examining Dragon Man, showing his knack for AI and cybernetics. Pym has also constructed two additional versions of artificial intelligence, Salvation (Sal) and Rover.

After constant experimentation with size-changing via ingested capsules and particle-filled gas, Pym is eventually able to change size at will, and mentally generate Pym particles to change the sizes of other living beings or inanimate objects. Pym retains his normal strength when "ant" size, and possesses greatly increased strength and stamina when in "giant" form, courtesy of the increased mass. Pym's costume is synthetic stretch fabric composed of unstable molecules and automatically adapts to his shifting sizes.

Pym uses a cybernetic helmet he created for achieving rudimentary communication with ants and other insects. As Yellowjacket, then later as Wasp, Pym wears artificial wings and has bio-blasters called "stingers" built into his gloves.

Pym carries a variety of weaponry, provisions, and scientific instruments, which are shrunken to the size of microchips and stored in the pockets of his uniform. An experienced superhero, Pym is a skilled hand-to-hand fighter. In his first appearance, he claimed to be a master of judo, is skilled in wrestling and karate and has since been seen in combat with opponents of both his own size and radically larger than himself (as a result of his size-changing abilities).

After fusing with Ultron, he now contains all of his creation's abilities when he is in control.

== Successors ==
There are a number of characters in the Marvel universe that have also used the "Pym particles" to effect size changing. These include Janet van Dyne, Clint Barton, Bill Foster, Scott Lang, Erik Josten, Rita DeMara, Cassandra "Cassie" Lang, Eric O'Grady, Tom Foster, Shang-Chi, Raz Malhotra, and Nadia Pym. Although they do not use their powers for altering their size, both Wonder Man and Vision derive their powers from Pym particles.

== Enemies ==
- Absorbing Man - A powerful enemy who can absorb the properties of everything he touches.
- A.I.M. - A scientific community that tried to recruit and kill Hank Pym in different occasions.
- Alkhema - An artificial intelligence born to be the second wife of Ultron. She has the brain patterns of the Avenger Mockingbird.
- Atlas - Erik Josten is a supervillain who can shrink or grow his own size. He also used the Goliath persona during his permanence in the Masters of Evil.
- Black Knight - A scientist who made knight-based technology after being denied the Ebony Blade.
- Dimitrios - A supervillain artificial intelligence created by Pym himself to destroy Ultron only to take a life of its own afterwards.
- Doctor Nemesis - A supervillain with the ability to shrink and grow in size just like Ant-Man.
- Egghead - A mad scientist with an egg-shaped head.
- Hijacker - An armored car company owner who became a car thief.
- Kraglin - An A-Chiltarian who assisted his kind in controlling a Cyclops robot to capture human specimens.
- Kulla - The dictator of the dimension of Dehnock.
- Liso Trago - A jazz musician from India who uses a special trumpet to control people. Ant-Man and Wasp turned his music against him causing Trago to forget his criminal intention and resume his career as a jazz musician.
- Living Eraser - An alien from Dimension Z whose Dimensionizer can transport anything to Dimension Z.
- Magician - A stage magician who used his stage acts in his crimes.
- MODAM - An alternate female version of MODOK who was originally supposed to be a revived Maria Trovaya. She is later revealed to be the mother of Hank's daughter Nadia prior to becoming MODAM.
- People's Defense Force - A team of Eastern European super-powered beings who had fought Hank Pym individually before coming together.
  - Beasts of Berlin - A group of western lowland gorillas mutated to human intelligence by Communist scientists and speech. They operate as a team.
  - El Toro - El Toro is Cuba's first super agent and an early opponent of Henry Pym.
  - Madame X - Madame X is a patriot and spy for the communist Hungarian government.
  - Scarlet Beetles - The Scarlet Beetles are normal beetles who have been mutated to a size of 10-feet and given human intelligence and speech.
  - Voice - A supervillain whose voice enables him to control anyone.
- Pilai - A Kosmonian criminal who was accidentally brought to Earth by Vernon van Dyne.
- Porcupine - A porcupine-themed villain.
- Protector - A jewelry store owner who adopted the Protector alias to extort his rivals.
- Time Master - Elias Weems is an elderly scientist who made an aging ray after having been fired from the Modern Scientific Research Company. After being defeated by Ant-Man when he realized that his visiting grandson Tommy was in the crowd that he aged, Weems was exonerated after Ant-Man and the Modern Scientific Research Company's owner persuaded the judge to waive the charges. Afterwards, Weems got his job back and showed Tommy around his place of work.
- Ultron - A robot created by Hank Pym who obtained sentience.
- Whirlwind - A mutant who can spin at supersonic speeds.

== Reception ==
=== Accolades ===
- In 2011, IGN ranked Hank Pym 67th in their "Top 100 Comic Book Heroes" list.
- In 2011, Wizard Magazine ranked Hank Pym 93rd in their "Top 200 Comic book Characters" list.
- In 2015, IGN ranked Hank Pym 16th in their "Top 50 Avengers" list.
- In 2020, Comic Book Resources (CBR) ranked Hank Pym 4th in their "10 Most Powerful Members Of The Pym Family" list and 6th in their "10 Best Superhero Doctors In Marvel & DC" list.
- In 2022, Newsarama ranked Hank Pym 11th in their "Best Avengers members of all time" list.
- In 2022, Screen Rant included Hank Pym in their "9 Strongest West Coast Avengers" list.
- In 2022, CBR ranked Hank Pym 5th in their "10 Smartest Marvel Scientists" list and 8th in their "10 Smartest Tech-Powered Heroes" list.

== Other versions ==
=== Earth-5012 ===
In this reality, Hank Pym is an intelligent, Hulk-like brute.

=== Heroes Reborn (2021) ===
In the 2021 Heroes Reborn reality, Hank Pym is a scientist and a devoted Christian who is a former friend and sidekick of Hyperion. After being possessed by Ultron, Pym is banished to the Negative Zone and eventually dismantled by Hyperion.

=== Marvel 1602 ===
An alternate universe version of Hank Pym, philosopher Henri le Pym from Earth-311, appears in Marvel 1602.

=== Marvel Adventures ===
Hank Pym appears in issue 13 of Marvel Adventures: The Avengers as a scientist working for Janet's father with no superhero identity, and was the one who gave his wife superpowers. He is visited by Spider-Man and Storm when Janet van Dyne (Giant-Girl in this continuity) falls under insect mind-control. He tells them how to free her (severing the antennae on her mask), gives her a new costume, and uses an insect telepathy helmet (identical to his Earth-616 Ant-Man helmet) to create an illusion of several giant-sized people, scaring the insects away. He returns in issue 20, becoming Ant-Man. He not only joins the team, but begins a relationship with Janet.

=== Marvel Apes ===
An alternate universe gorilla version of Hank Pym from Earth-8101, known as Gro-Rilla, appears in Marvel Apes.

=== Marvel Zombies ===
A zombified alternate universe version of Hank Pym from Earth-2149 appears in Marvel Zombies.

=== MC2 ===
The MC2 imprint title A-Next, set in a futuristic alternate universe, features Hank Pym and Janet Pym's twin children (Hope Pym and Henry Pym Jr.), who have turned into the supervillains Red Queen and Big Man respectively.

=== Old Man Logan ===
In the post-apocalyptic Old Man Logan storyline, which takes place on Earth-807128, Hank Pym (as Giant-Man) is killed by the Red Skull's army of villains. Decades later, a settlement called "Pym Falls" is built around his corpse. In addition, his Ant-Man helmet is shown in the possession of a young boy named Dwight, who uses it to command an army of ants to enforce the payment of tolls across a bridge.

=== The Last Avengers Story ===
In an alternate future in the miniseries The Last Avengers Story #1-2 (November 1995), Ultron wishes for a decisive victory over the Avengers. After eliminating the team, he has Hank Pym gather a new group. After recruiting other heroes and mercenaries, Pym leads them to victory though fatalities are heavy on both sides.

=== Ultimate Marvel ===
An alternate universe version of Hank Pym from Earth-1610 appears in Ultimate Marvel. This version is a former member of the Ultimates who gained his abilities from experimenting on his wife Janet van Dyne. He is later killed by the Multiple Man before being resurrected by the Maker and High Evolutionary.

=== Ultimate Universe ===
An alternate universe version of Hank Pym appears in the Ultimate Universe imprint. This version's experiments were sabotaged by the Maker, leaving him with brain damage. In the present, Pym and his wife Janet operate an extermination service until they are recruited into the Ultimates, respectively assuming the Giant-Man and Wasp identities.

== In other media ==
=== Television ===
- Hank Pym as Giant-Man and Goliath appears in The Marvel Super Heroes, voiced by Tom Harvey.
- Hank Pym as Ant-Man appears in a 1979 sketch of Saturday Night Live, portrayed by Garrett Morris.
- An alternate timeline version of Hank Pym as Goliath makes a non-speaking cameo appearance in the X-Men: The Animated Series episode "One Man's Worth". This version is from a timeline where Professor X was killed before the X-Men's formation.
- Hank Pym as Ant-Man and Giant-Man appears in The Avengers: United They Stand, voiced by Rod Wilson. This version is the leader of the Avengers.
- Hank Pym as Ant-Man appears in the Fantastic Four: World's Greatest Heroes episode "World's Tiniest Heroes", voiced by John Payne. This version is a friend of Mister Fantastic's.
- Hank Pym as Ant-Man appears in The Super Hero Squad Show episode "This Forest Green!", voiced by Greg Grunberg.
- Hank Pym as Ant-Man, Giant-Man, and Yellowjacket appears in The Avengers: Earth's Mightiest Heroes, voiced by Wally Wingert. This version is a pacifist and founding member of the Avengers. He operates as Ant-Man and Giant-Man in the first season and Yellowjacket in the second season.
- Hank Pym as Giant-Man appears in Marvel Disk Wars: The Avengers, voiced by Yasunori Masutani.
- Hank Pym, based on the Marvel Cinematic Universe version (see below), appears in Ant-Man (2017), voiced by Dee Bradley Baker.
- Hank Pym makes a cameo appearance in the Marvel Future Avengers episode "The Rage of Black Bolt".

=== Film ===
- Hank Pym as Giant-Man and Ant-Man, based on the Ultimate Marvel incarnation, appears in Ultimate Avengers and Ultimate Avengers 2, voiced by Nolan North. He joins the Ultimates in fighting Chitauri invasions.
- Hank Pym as Giant-Man makes a non-speaking appearance in Next Avengers: Heroes of Tomorrow. He was killed by Ultron alongside the other Avengers prior to the film.

=== Marvel Cinematic Universe ===
Hank Pym appears in media set in the Marvel Cinematic Universe (MCU), portrayed by Michael Douglas, with Dax Griffin and John Michael Morris serving as body doubles in flashback sequences. This version originally operated as Ant-Man and an agent of S.H.I.E.L.D. decades earlier until his wife Janet van Dyne / Wasp seemingly died during one of their missions and he discovered S.H.I.E.L.D.'s attempts to recreate his Pym Particle formula and resigned. In the present, he recruits Scott Lang to become the new Ant-Man, helps his daughter Hope van Dyne become the new Wasp, rescues Janet from the Quantum Realm, and becomes a victim of the Blip. Pym is introduced in the live-action film Ant-Man (2015), and makes subsequent appearances in the live-action films Ant-Man and the Wasp (2018), Avengers: Endgame (2019), and Ant-Man and the Wasp: Quantumania (2023). Additionally, Douglas voices alternate timeline variants of Pym in the Disney+ animated series What If...?, with one appearing as Ant-Man and another as Yellowjacket. A non-speaking zombified variant of the character appears in Marvel Zombies.

=== Video games ===
- Hank Pym as Giant-Man appears as an assist character in Avengers in Galactic Storm.
- Hank Pym appears as an NPC in Marvel: Ultimate Alliance, voiced by Jerry Houser.
- Hank Pym as Yellowjacket appears as a boss in Marvel: Ultimate Alliance 2, voiced by Wally Wingert.
- Hank Pym as Ant-Man makes a cameo appearance in Ultimate Marvel vs. Capcom 3.
- Hank Pym as Ant-Man and Giant-Man appear as separate playable characters in Marvel Super Hero Squad Online, voiced by Yuri Lowenthal.
- Hank Pym appears as an unlockable character in Marvel: Avengers Alliance.
- Hank Pym appears as an NPC in Marvel Heroes, voiced again by Wally Wingert. Additionally, his Ant-Man design appears as an enhanced costume for Scott Lang / Ant-Man.
- Hank Pym as Ant-Man appears in Lego Marvel Super Heroes, voiced again by Nolan North.
- Hank Pym as Ant-Man appears in Lego Marvel's Avengers.
- Hank Pym as Ant-Man appears as a team-up character in Disney Infinity 2.0.
- Hank Pym's fusion with Ultron appears as a playable character in Marvel: Future Fight, with Giant-Man and Goliath appearing as alternate skins.
- Hank Pym appears as an unlockable character in Marvel Avengers Academy, voiced by Christopher McCullough.
- Hank Pym as Giant-Man, Ant-Man, and Yellowjacket appear as separate playable characters in Lego Marvel Super Heroes 2, voiced by Dar Dash. Additionally, a future version of Pym who became Yellowjacket appears in a bonus mission.
- Hank Pym appears as an NPC in Marvel's Avengers, voiced by Danny Jacobs. This version originally operated as Ant-Man before A.I.M. altered his physiology so that any attempt to shrink himself would be fatal. Following this, he became the leader of the Resistance to rescue Inhumans from A.I.M. and give them sanctuary in his base, the Ant Hill.
- Hank Pym appears in Marvel Future Revolution, voiced again by Wally Wingert. This version is a scientist for Omega Flight. Additionally, an alternate reality version of Pym as Yellowjacket makes an appearance.

=== Miscellaneous ===
- Hank Pym appears in Peter David's novelization of Spider-Man 2. He attends Dr. Otto Octavius's first experiment with his mechanical arms. After the experiment goes awry, Pym confirms he is alive and implies his wife Rosalie is dead.
- The MCU incarnation of Hank Pym serves as the namesake of the Pym Test Kitchen and Pym Tasting Lab restaurant attractions in Avengers Campus at Disney California Adventure.

== Collected editions ==
Title	Material collected	Published date	ISBN
Essential Astonishing Ant-Man, Vol. 1	Tales to Astonish #27, 35–69	March 2002	978-0785108221
Marvel Masterworks: Ant-Man/Giant-Man Vol. 1	Tales to Astonish #27; 35–52	August 2009	978-0785120490
Marvel Masterworks: Ant-Man/Giant-Man Vol. 2	Tales to Astonish #53-69	August 2009	978-0785129110
Marvel Masterworks: Ant-Man/Giant-Man Vol. 3	Marvel Feature #4-10, Power Man #24-25, Black Goliath #1-5, Champions #11-13, Marvel Premiere #47-48 and material from Iron Man (1968) #44	June 2018	978-1302910792
Ant-Man/Giant-Man Epic Collection v. 1: The Man in the Ant Hill	Tales to Astonish #27, 35–59	July 2015	978-0785198505
Ant-Man/Giant-Man Epic Collection v. 2: Ant-Man No More	Tales to Astonish #60-69, Marvel Feature #4-10, Power Man #24-25, Black Goliath #1-5, Champions #11-13, Marvel Premiere #47-48 and material from Iron Man (1968) #44	January, 2023	
Avengers: The Many Faces of Henry Pym	Tales to Astonish #27, 35, 49, Avengers (vol. 1) #28, 59–60, West Coast Avengers #21, Avengers Annual 2001, Secret Invasion: Requiem	June 2012	978-0785162063
Ant-Man/Giant-Man: Growing Pains	Avengers (vol. 1) #28, 139, Avengers Academy #7, material from Tales to Astonish #49, Marvel Double Feature: Avengers/Giant-Man #379-382	July 2018	978-1302913816
Avengers: The Trial of Yellowjacket	The Avengers #212-230	August 2012	978-0785162070
Ant-Man: Astonishing Origins	Ant-Man: Season One, Ant-Man (vol. 1) #1	June 2018	978-0785163909
Avengers Origins	Avengers Origins: Ant-Man & Wasp and Avengers Origins: Luke Cage, Avengers Origins: Quicksilver & The Scarlet Witch, Avengers Origins: Thor, Avengers Origins: Vision	April 2012	978-1846535086
Ant-Man & Wasp: Small World	Ant-Man & Wasp #1-3	June 2011	978-0785155676
Ant-Man: Ant-Niversary	Ant-Man (vol. 3) #1-4 and material from Tales To Astonish #37, 43	January 2023	978-1302945428
