= Larry Lieber =

American comic book artist and writer (born 1931)

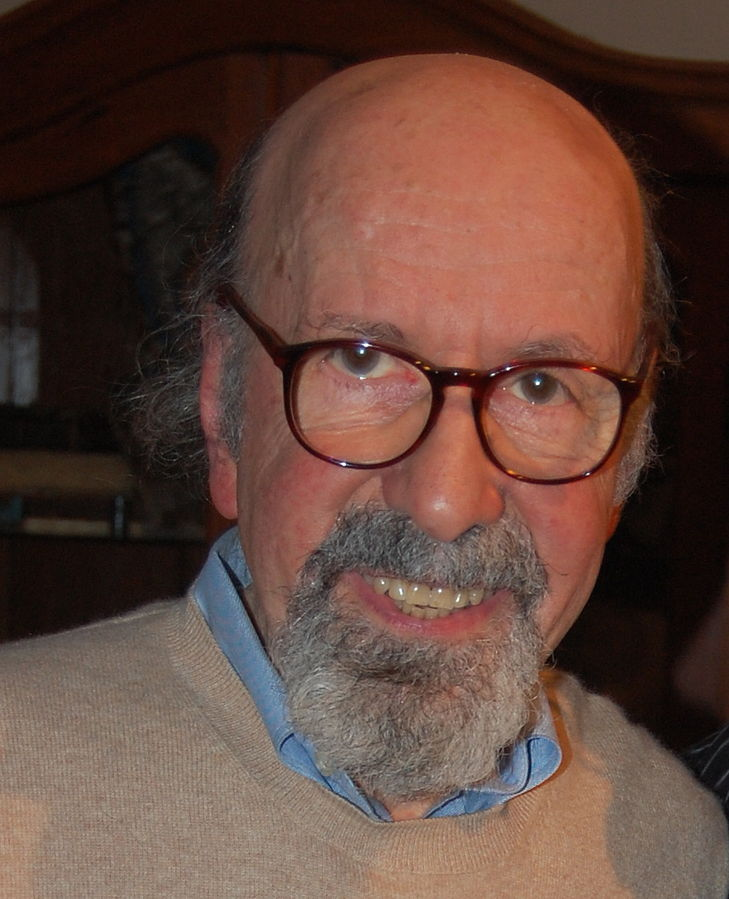
- Lieber in 2012
- Born: Lawrence D. Lieber; October 26, 1931 (age 95) New York City, U.S.
- Areas: Writer, Penciller, Editor
- Notable works: Rawhide Kid; Iron Man; Thor; Ant-Man
- Awards: Bill Finger Award; Inkwell Awards Keeper of the Flame (2025)
- Relatives: Stan Lee (brother)

Lawrence D. Lieber (/ˈliːbər/; born October 26, 1931) is an American comic book writer and artist best known as co-creator of the Marvel Comics superheroes Iron Man, Thor, and Ant-Man. He is also known for his long stint both writing and drawing the Marvel Western Rawhide Kid and for illustrating the newspaper comic strip The Amazing Spider-Man from 1986 to 2018. From 1974 to 1975, he was editor of Atlas/Seaboard Comics. Lieber is the younger brother of Stan Lee, who had been a writer, editor, and publisher of Marvel Comics.

== Early life ==
Larry Lieber was born in Manhattan, New York City, the second child of Romanian-Jewish immigrant parents Celia (née Solomon) (1894–1947) and Jack Lieber (1886–1968), and the brother of Stanley Martin Lieber, later known as Marvel Comics editor and impresario Stan Lee (1922–2018). When he was six months old, the family moved to The Bronx, settling at 1720 University Avenue, which Lee described as a one-bedroom, "third-floor apartment facing out back", with him and Larry sharing a bedroom and his parents using a foldout couch. At "about ten-and-a-half", with his brother in the U.S. Army, Lieber and his parents returned to Manhattan, moving to the Washington Heights neighborhood. Already interested in art and drawing by this time, he attended George Washington High School there.

Lee wrote in his autobiography that when Larry was a teenager, the boys' mother died and Lieber went to live with his brother and his sister-in-law, Joan, prompting the trio's move to Woodmere, New York, on Long Island. Lee elsewhere described that move to a two-story, three-bedroom home at 1084 West Broadway as occurring in 1949, when Larry would have been 17 or 18. As Lieber recalled it to comics historian Daniel Best, "My mother died when I was 16. My brother was back from the Service, he was just married and he moved out outside of New York to Long Island. I lived with him for a while and it didn't work out so well. I wanted to leave, so I left. I was very young and I had a couple of jobs."

At 17, Lieber became a messenger for The New York Times and also found work at the Times Square studio of Sam Furber, a letterer whose work included movie posters. For roughly a year and a half, he lived in the since-defunct Hotel Manhattan Towers, a residence hotel at Broadway and West 76th Street in Manhattan.

== Career ==
=== Early work ===
In 1941, Lee was made the editor of Timely Comics, the future Marvel Comics, then a division of a publishing company owned by a relative, Martin Goodman. Lieber began working for Goodman as an art assistant on the magazine side, "doing paste-ups. ... I was working during the day and I went to [the Pratt Institute art school, in Brooklyn, in] the evening." There Lieber began illustrating comic books; his first known credit is penciling and inking the four-page crime comics story "Cop on the Beat", by an unknown writer, in All True Crime #44 (cover-dated May 1951).

In 1951, he enlisted in the U.S. Air Force, beginning four years of military service. Serving during the Korean War, he spent two of those years stationed at Okinawa, after having done his boot-camp training at the since-defunct Sampson Air Force Base, near the Finger Lakes region of New York State.

=== 1950s ===
After returning from the service, Lieber attended Manhattan's Art Students League. "I still wanted to be an artist and do comics, but I had in mind to eventually become an illustrator," he said in 1999. "I was drawing, but I was slow." He again drew for his brother, editor Stan Lee, at the 1950s forerunner of Marvel Comics, known generally as Atlas Comics, though whether on staff or freelance is uncertain. Regardless, his next confirmed credit is penciling and inking the three-page story "A World to Conquer" in Journey into Unknown Worlds #52 (Dec. 1956), followed by stories in such Atlas romance comics as Love Romances, Love Tales, Stories of Romance, True Tales of Love and The Romances of Nurse Helen Grant in issues cover-dated April to August 1957 and July 1958. Because it was not standard industry practice during this time to give writer and artist credits, Lieber may have supplied more. He recalled in 1999 he had written some or all of these stories himself, "because I remember Stan was saying to me, 'You write romances really well.'" In 1958, following an economic downturn for the publisher and the firing of virtually all the comics staffers save Lee, "Stan said he wanted somebody to help him write, and he had nobody then; he was doing it all himself. I said, 'I'm not really a writer.' He said, 'Oh, I've read your letters.'"

Lieber, by now living in the Tudor City apartment complex in Manhattan, began freelancing regularly for the nascent Marvel Comics, "writing stories for Jack [Kirby] to draw", referring to the artist who had co-created Captain America for the company in 1940 and had recently returned for a long, exclusive stint in which Kirby would co-create many signature Marvel characters in the Silver Age of Comics. At this point in the late 1950s, Kirby was drawing science fiction / fantasy stories followed by giant-monster tales in what collectors and historians call "pre-superhero Marvel" comics, primarily Journey into Mystery, Strange Tales, Tales of Suspense and Tales to Astonish. As Lieber recalled of those creature features,

Stan made up the plot, and then he'd give it to me, and I'd write the script. Tudor City had a park, and when it was nice I'd sit there and break the story down picture by picture. I was unsure of myself just sitting down to write a script. Since I knew how to draw, I'd think, 'Oh, this shot will have a guy coming this way ... this shot will have a guy looking down on him,' and later I'd sit at the typewriter and type it up. After a while, I'd just go to the typewriter. ... These were all scripts in advance [that Kirby would illustrate].

Lieber's earliest, tentatively confirmed pre-superhero Marvel script is for the six-page Don Heck-illustrated "I Am the Beast-Man" in Strange Tales #77 (Oct. 1960), and his first confirmed is the 13-page "I Led the Strange Search for Manoo", penciled by Kirby and inked by Dick Ayers, in Amazing Adventures #2 (July 1961).

=== Marvel superheroes and the Rawhide Kid ===
Under Stan Lee plots, Lieber would go on to script the debut origin stories and other early appearances of the superheroes Thor (co-created with artist Jack Kirby) in Journey into Mystery, Iron Man (co-created with Kirby and Don Heck) in Tales of Suspense, and Ant-Man (co-created with Kirby) in Tales to Astonish. This included creating the names of their respective alter egos: Donald Blake, Tony Stark, and Hank Pym. His first superhero work, the first appearance of Marvel's Thor in Journey into Mystery #83 (Aug. 1962), introduced one of the mainstays of the Marvel Universe, the mystical metal "uru", of which Thor's hammer Mjolnir is made. As Lieber recalled, "I kind of liked it; it was short. It's easy on the letterer; they're going to be using it all the time. I don't know where the hell I came up with it. I used to get names out of the back of the dictionary, from the biographical section where you have foreign names, Russian, this and that. I used to go to it and gets parts of names to put together."

As Stan Lee recalled, in his trademark jocular style, in 1974,

Heretofore, I had written all of the origin tales of each new character, as well as the subsequent follow-up stories in every series. But now it was impossible. I simply wouldn't have the time to continue with The Fantastic Four, The Hulk, Spider-Man and the other odd Western, mystery, romance, humor, and assorted monster tales I was writing and still do justice to our newest feature yet a'borning. ... [As well i]t was simply too risky for me not to be grooming some other writers to fill the break if necessary. I needed someone to write the new feature, which would hopefully be Marvel's fourth winner in our little superhero sweepstakes. Slowly surveying our entire, vast writing staff — which mainly consisted of myself and any occasional freelancer who happened to wander in to make a free phone call — my ... gaze happened to fall upon ... Larry Lieber — and I remembered that he had many times expressed a desire to write a superhero story. ...

Lieber in 1999 remembered circumstances less hyperbolically: "Thor was just another story. I didn't think about it at all. Stan said, 'I'm trying to make up a character,' and he gave me the plot, and he said, 'Why don't you write the story?'" Under Lee's plotting, Lieber's eight Thor stories also introduced the Marvel characters Loki, Odin, and Balder, from the pantheon of Norse mythological gods; their home, Asgard; and Bifrost the Rainbow Bridge, which connected that realm to Earth. For another series, starring the Human Torch from the Fantastic Four, Lieber co-created the longstanding supervillain the Wizard in Strange Tales #102 (Nov. 1962).

After the debut Iron Man story in Tales of Suspense #39 (March 1963), however, Lee replaced Lieber with Robert Bernstein, writing as "R. Berns", for the next seven issues before Lee took over the reins himself for a few stories. Don Rico, writing as "N. Korok", followed for a two-issue stint. Lee then took over as regular writer for the next few years. Lieber wrote the first nine Ant-Man stories (following the character's non-costumed introduction months earlier) in Tales to Astonish #35-43 (Sept. 1962 - May 1963) before veteran Ernie Hart did five issues, followed by Lee taking over. As Lieber explained, Lee

... wasn't always the most patient person and I had problems [writing] the dialogue and he said, "Why did you say that? You could have said it this way, or this way or that way," and I'm realizing, yeah, I don't think of it that way or this way. So at any rate finally I think at one point he got a little exasperated and he said, ..."I'm going to hire some of the old pros." He remembered writers from the past. ... He still gave me work, he didn't want to take work away, but they were putting out a few more books. So he hired somebody and then the next week when I came back to him he said, ..."Larry, you know something, you're no good, but you're better than these other guys". So that was my first victory if you want to call that a victory, right. The others are worse than me.

Lieber, who credits Lee as a good editor, writer and writing teacher, said his brother made very few editorial changes to Lieber's scripts. "He would go over it and ... if it were in the early years, he might correct or change a line or two. But he always used it. ... I never had to, you know, go home and do it again. He was very easy, he was showing me ... and he'd make some little corrections. And as time went on, he had fewer to make."

Lieber largely left superheroes to write and pencil what would be his signature series, the Marvel Western Rawhide Kid, beginning with issue #41 (Aug. 1964) and continuing through 1973 (after which it became a reprint title). Lieber recalled,

I don't remember why I wanted to do it, particularly. I think I wanted a little more freedom. I didn't do enough of the superheroes to know whether I'd like them. What I didn't prefer was the style that was developing. It didn't appeal to me. ... Maybe there was just too much humor in it, or too much something. ... I remember, at the time, I wanted to make everything serious. I didn't want to give a light tone to it. When I did Rawhide Kid, I wanted people to cry as if they were watching High Noon or something. ... I'm a little unclear about leaving the superheroes and going to Rawhide Kid. I know that at the time I wanted — what's the expression? — a little space for myself or something, and I wanted to do a little drawing again.

Lieber also penciled The Amazing Spider-Man Annual #4-5 (1967–1968), the latter introducing in flashback the late parents of protagonist Peter Parker; co-wrote and co-penciled the first solo Doctor Doom feature story, in Marvel Super-Heroes #20 (May 1969); and did occasional other work including, for Magazine Management's men's magazines, several stories of the bawdy "nudie-cutie" comedy feature "Pussycat". With the end of his run on Rawhide Kid, Lieber found little further Marvel work. He scripted and occasionally also drew the odd Western or Sgt. Fury war-comics story or a standalone tale in one of the Marvel line of black-and-white magazines such as Vampire Tales or Haunt of Horror. "It wasn't a very easy period," he said in 1999. "They needed superhero-reprint covers, and I could do them somewhat in Kirby's style." He considered seeking work at rival DC Comics, as some other Marvel writers and artists did, but found, "I was the only one who could never do that because that was the price for Stan being my brother. So I could never do that. ... They would have thought Stan Lee is sending over a spy or something you know. I would see what they're doing and go back or whatever the hell it was. So I couldn't do that, I couldn't work."

=== Atlas/Seaboard and return to Marvel ===
In 1974, Lieber left Marvel to take on an editorship at Atlas/Seaboard Comics, the term comic book historians and collectors use to refer to the "Atlas Comics" line published by Seaboard Periodicals, to differentiate it from the 1950s Marvel Comics predecessor Atlas Comics. Marvel Comics founder and longtime publisher Martin Goodman had left Marvel in 1972, having sold the company in 1968, and launched this new company in June 1974 to go head-to-head with Marvel and DC Comics. He hired Lieber to be editor of the Atlas black-and-white comics-magazines, and additionally hired Warren Publishing veteran Jeff Rovin to edit the color comic-book line, which soon fell under Lieber's editorship.

As Lieber, in a 1999 interview, described his experience as editor:

When I went there, Martin put out two kinds of books. He was putting out color comics, and he was also going to put out black-and-white comics like Warren and Marvel. Now, I knew nothing about black-and-white comics, right? My only experience was in the color comics. Jeff Rovin came from Warren, and he knew nothing about color comics. Martin unfortunately put Jeff in charge of all the color comics and put me in charge of the black-and-white books. It was an unfortunate thing, and basically what happened was that Jeff's books didn't turn out so well ... Martin had to pay high freelance rates, because otherwise nobody would work for a new and unproven company ... It didn't work out too well, and Jeff finally left angrily or something, and I had to take over all his books. At this point, business was bad, and I tried to do what I could. One of the things I had to do was to cut rates and tell people they were going to make less money, which was not an enviable position.

When Atlas went under in late 1975, Lieber received six months severance pay and spent time trying to devise a newspaper comic strip for syndication. Lee then offered him the editorship of Marvel UK, the New York City-based imprint that produced black-and-white reprint comics for the UK market, as well as new stories of the superhero Captain Britain. With co-scripter Gary Friedrich primarily, Lieber wrote the hero's seven-page lead feature in the weekly Captain Britain #24-37 (March 23 - June 22, 1977), and, with co-writer Jim Lawrence, Captain Britain adventures in Marvel UK's Super Spider-Man #233-246 (July 27-Oct. 26, 1977). Lieber also wrote and penciled two Spider-Man stories, in Web of Spider-Man #21 and 25 (Dec. 1986, April 1987).

=== Hulk and Spider-Man comic strips ===
In 1978, Lieber began penciling and sometimes inking the new daily and Sunday comic strip The Incredible Hulk, written by Lee and syndicated by the Register and Tribune Syndicate. He additionally began writing it in early 1979. Though he gave up the role of regular artist in Spring 1979 and the role of regular writer in mid-1982, he would still write and draw the occasional installment until the strip's end in September 1982. Lieber said Lee gave a rare compliment on the Hulk strip, telling his brother, "[I]t's very good. Also I think it's even more dramatic than [the] Spider-Man [comic strip]".

In 1980 and 1981, concurrent with the Hulk strip, Lieber contributed some degree of penciling on the daily and Sunday comic strip The Amazing Spider-Man until Fred Kida took over as regular penciler. Lieber then succeeded Kida on the daily strip in 1986. Lieber also penciled the Sunday page again from 1990 through at least 1995.

Lieber recalled in 2007,

The Hulk was kind of popular on television, and so I drew The [Incredible] Hulk. Stan was writing it and after a while The Hulk wasn't doing well ... and Stan decided to give it up, or give up his part. He said, "Larry if you want, you can write The Hulk and draw it". So once again I was writing and drawing, and that I enjoyed even more than the Rawhide Kid. I made up stories that I really liked and it lasted a little while. After that, after the Hulk, Stan left. I think he went out to Hollywood or out to California and that's when Jim Shooter came in [as Marvel editor-in-chief] and took over. I didn't have any steady work then. I did a few inventory stories [in the comic books] or different things, until finally they needed somebody, an artist, on [the] Spider-Man [comic] strip, which Fred Kida had been doing until he retired. They tried somebody else and it didn't work out and they offered it to me and I started doing it and I've been doing it for 20 years now it'll be.

In a 2010 interview Lieber described how he collaborated with Lee on The Amazing Spider-Man strip: "I get a full script. I can make certain changes, if I wish, and all that, but it's a full script, which I welcome. ... I call him every week. I reduce the pencils and I fax them. I try to finish it, but sometimes I can't, so he just sees roughs, but that is good enough for him to get the idea if I captured the scene right. Then he goes over it, and usually he will change things in the writing, and sometimes in the artwork. When he has made corrections, I have fortunately agreed with it." He retired from pencilling the strip in July 2018. His final strip ran September 8, 2018.

=== Work after Marvel ===
In 2025, Lieber published his first novel, Chirps. The book centers around a genetically altered parakeet who is rescued by a wealthy old man. Lieber explained the idea came about when he wanted to create his own original superhero, but didn't feel like going through Marvel's catalog of characters, quipping that he "wouldn't live long enough to go through them all." He eventually settled on a parakeet; believing no one at Marvel would come up with anything similar. on March 11th, 2025, Lieber announced he had begun work on his second novel after Chirps.

Lieber made a brief return to comics on September 30th, 2026, for Amazing Spider-Man #1000, where he served as writer for the western backup story "Of Webs and Six-Guns." Lieber was not brought in to pencil the story, with it instead being illustrated by artist Giuseppe Camuncoli. The story reunites Lieber with his co-creation, Rawhide Kid, which he wrote and drew starting from August 1963 through 1974.

== Awards ==
Lieber was a recipient of the San Diego Comic-Con's 2003 Inkpot Awards. In 2008, he was one of two recipients of that year's Bill Finger Award, which annually honors one living and one deceased comics creator. The award was presented on July 25, 2008, during the 2008 Will Eisner Comic Industry Awards ceremony at San Diego Comic-Con. In 2025, he was awarded the Inkwell Awards honorary Keeper of the Flame Award, for his seven decades of career achievements in the comic book industry as a writer, editor, and artist, including inking.

Preceded by None	Thor writer (Journey into Mystery stories); 1962 (with Stan Lee)	Succeeded by Stan Lee
Preceded by Stan Lee	Rawhide Kid writer 1964–1973	Succeeded by none
Preceded by Dick Ayers	Rawhide Kid artist 1964–1973	Succeeded by none
