= Grant George =

American voice actor

- George in 2017
- Occupation: Voice actor
- Years active: 1996–present
- Agent: AVO Talent
- Notable credit(s): Bleach as Izuru Kira; Final Fantasy series as The Warrior of Light; Persona as Shinjiro Aragaki; When They Cry as Keiichi Maebara; Danganronpa V3: Killing Harmony as Shuichi Saihara; Nura: Rise of the Yokai Clan as Night Rikuo; Scott Lang in various Marvel Comics media Avengers Confidential: Black Widow and Punisher as Elihas Starr
- Spouse: Jessica Gee-George
- Children: 2
- Website: www.grantgeorge.com

Grant George is an American voice actor, known for voicing characters in anime dubs and video games. He was the voice of Izuru Kira from the Bleach anime series, the Warrior of Light from Final Fantasy, Shinjiro Aragaki from the Persona series, Night Rikuo from the Nura: Rise of the Yokai Clan series, Uzu Sanageyama from Kill la Kill, Chikage Rokujo from the Durarara!! series, Shuichi Saihara from Danganronpa V3: Killing Harmony, Keiichi Maebara from When They Cry, Lancer from Fate/Zero, and Gilgamesh in Fate/stay night and its film adaptation. He has also voiced Scott Lang in several animated series based on Marvel Comics.

== Personal life ==
Grant is married to fellow voice actress Jessica Gee-George, with whom he has two children.

== Filmography ==
=== Anime ===
- A Lull in the Sea – Itaru Shiodome
- Ah My Buddha – Sakon
- Baki – Sikorsky
- Bleach – Izuru Kira, additional voices
- Bludgeoning Angel Dokuro-Chan – Umezawa
- Boruto: Naruto Next Generations – Suigetsu Hozuki
- Charlotte – Udo, Gondo
- Code Geass: Lelouch of the Rebellion – Kento Sugiyama
- Cyborg 009 (2001 Series) – Ryan (Ep. 9)
- Digimon Fusion – Dorbickmon
- Disgaea – Vyers, King Krichevskoy
- Durarara!!×2 – Rokujo Chikage
- Eiken – Shima Kurosawa
- Eyeshield 21 – Tetsuo Ishimaru, Unsui Kongo
- Fate/stay night – Gilgamesh
- Fate/Zero – Lancer
- Fighting Spirit – Tatsuya Kimura
- Ghost in the Shell: S.A.C. 2nd GIG – Akamine
- Glitter Force Doki Doki - Jonathan "Johnny" Klondike
- Higurashi When They Cry – Keiichi Maebara
- Hunter × Hunter - Knov
- Initial D – Seiji Iwaki (Tokyopop Dub)
- If I See You in My Dreams – Funakoshi
- JoJo's Bizarre Adventure: Stardust Crusaders - Dan of Steel/Steely Dan
- K – Ichigen Miwa (Previous Colorless King), Akira Hidaka, Rikio Kamamoto, Sota Mishina, Daiki Fuse
- Kanokon – Saku Ezomori
- Kekkaishi – Gen Shishio
- Kill la Kill – Uzu Sanageyama
- Kite Liberator – Rin Gaga
- Kyo Kara Maoh! – Christel, Ken Murata
- Di Gi Charat: Leave it to Piyoko! – Rik Heisenberg
- Mahoromatic – Additional voices
- Marvel Anime: Blade – Ladu (Ep. 1)
- Marvel Future Avengers – Karnak
- Mazinkaizer SKL – Kiba
- Mobile Suit Gundam: Iron-Blooded Orphans – Iok Kujan
- Monster – Detective Batela
- Moribito: Guardian of the Spirit – Yarsam (Ep. 12)
- Mouse – Sorata Muon/Mouse
- Naruto – Yoroi Akado
- Naruto Shippuden – Suigetsu Hozuki, Torune, Yoroi Akado, Urakaku, Fire Daimyō
- Nodame Cantabile – Ryutaro Mine
- Nura: Rise of the Yokai Clan series – Rikuo Nura (Yokai Form)
- Requiem from the Darkness – Momosuke Yamaoka
- Sailor Moon – Joe, Kitakata, Gamecen (Ep. 25, 137 Viz Media dub)
- Skip Beat! - Sho Fuwa
- Sugar, A Little Snow Fairy – Henry (Ep. 1), additional voices
- Sword Art Online II – Zexceed/Tamotsu Shigemura
- Tokko – Ichiro Hanazo
- Ultra Maniac – Mr. Mikami, Shiro
- Yukikaze – Hangar Announcement (Ep. 5), Radar Operator
- Zetman – Kouga Amagi
- Huntik: Secrets & Seekers – Den Fears

== Filmography ==
=== Animation ===
- Avengers Assemble – Ant-Man (seasons 1-3), additional voices
- Barbie: Life in the Dreamhouse – Randy Bravo
- Big Rig Buddies – Rocky the Robot Truck, Stinky the Garbage Truck
- Elena of Avalor – Troyo
- Ever After High – Hunter Huntsman
- Guardians of the Galaxy – Ant-Man
- Lego Marvel Super Heroes: Avengers Reassembled – Ant-Man
- Miraculous: Tales of Ladybug and Cat Noir – Lê Chiến Kim, additional voices
- Ultimate Spider-Man – Ant-Man, additional voices
- Popples - Yikes

=== Film ===
- Avengers Confidential: Black Widow & Punisher – Elihas Starr
- Bleach: The DiamondDust Rebellion – Izuru Kira
- Bleach: Memories of Nobody – Izuru Kira
- Fate/stay night: Unlimited Blade Works – Gilgamesh
- Fly Me to the Moon – Russian Fly (uncredited)
- Ghost in the Shell 2.0 – Additional voices
- Hotel Transylvania 2 – Additional voices
- Naruto Shippuden the Movie: Blood Prison – Satori
- Tales from Earthsea – Additional voices
- Team Hot Wheels: The Origin of Awesome! – Gage, Male Reporter, Pilot
- The Happy Cricket – Father Cricket
- The House of Magic – Daniel

=== Video games ===
- 007: From Russia with Love – Additional voices
- The 3rd Birthday – Additional Voices
- Ace Combat Zero: The Belkan War – Gelb 2, Remnant soldiers
- Arcania: Gothic 4 – Baldrum, Galamod, Trainer, various
- Armored Core V - City Police Officer A, AC Pilot
- Atlantica Online – Additional voices
- Atelier Rorona: The Alchemist of Arland – Tristan/Tantris
- Bladestorm: The Hundred Years' War – William
- BlazBlue: Chronophantasma – Kagura Mutsuki (uncredited)
- Bleach: Shattered Blade – Izuru Kira
- Culdcept Saga – Main Game Saga (uncredited)
- Danganronpa: Trigger Happy Havoc – Leon Kuwata (uncredited)
- Danganronpa V3: Killing Harmony – Shuichi Saihara (uncredited)
- Dead or Alive 5 – Brad Wong (uncredited)
- Dead or Alive: Dimensions – Brad Wong, Victor Donovan
- Dirge of Cerberus: Final Fantasy VII – Additional voices
- Disgaea 7: Vows of the Virtueless – Axel
- Dissidia Final Fantasy – Warrior of Light
- Dissidia 012 Final Fantasy – Warrior of Light
- Dissidia Final Fantasy NT – Warrior of Light
- Disgaea series – Vyers/King Krichevskoy, Axel, Prinny (uncredited)
- Dynasty Warriors 5: Xtreme Legends – Sun Jian, additional voices (uncredited)
- Dynasty Warriors 5: Empires – Sun Jian, additional voices (uncredited)
- Dynasty Warriors 6 – Sun Jian, additional voices (uncredited)
- Dynasty Warriors StrikeForce – Light Equipment Officer (uncredited)
- EverQuest II: The Fallen Quest – Additional voices
- Evolve – EMET
- Final Fantasy Type-0 HD – Additional voices
- Final Fantasy XIII-2 – Additional voices
- Final Fantasy XIV: A Realm Reborn – Cid nan Garlond
- Fire Emblem Echoes: Shadows of Valentia - Clive
- Fire Emblem Heroes - Clive, Sigurd
- Gothic 3 – Additional voices
- Heroes of the Storm – Gall
- Hitman: Blood Money – Additional voices
- Hour of Victory – Calvin Blackwell, Commander
- Kamen Rider: Dragon Knight – Axe
- Killzone 3 – Additional voices
- Lord of Magna: Maiden Heaven – Kaiser
- Luminous Arc – Alph (uncredited)
- MechWarrior: Tactical Command – David Lee, Nathaniel Hammer
- Monster Kingdom: Jewel Summoner – Bargus
- Naruto Shippuden series – Suigetsu Hozuki
- Odin Sphere – Krois, additional voices (uncredited)
- Operation Darkness – Additional voices (uncredited)
- Persona 3 – Shinjiro Aragaki, Jin Shirato, Officer Kurosawa (uncredited)
- Persona 3 FES – Shinjiro Aragaki, Jin Shirato
- Persona 3 Portable - Shinjiro Aragaki, Jin Shirato, Officer Kurosawa
- Persona 3 Reload - Takeharu Kirijo
- Pimp My Ride – Vinny, Shady Guy, Additional Voices
- Prinny 2 – Prinny
- Radiata Stories – Cesar, Shin, Johan (uncredited)
- Rondo of Swords – Lloyd
- Sengoku Basara: Samurai Heroes – Additional voices
- Shinobido 2: Revenge of Zen – Ichijo Samurai General, Kihan Oxcar
- Sin & Punishment: Star Successor – Isa
- Sky Crawlers: Innocent Aces – Kaida
- Soulcalibur III – Kilik (uncredited)
- Soulcalibur IV – Kilik (uncredited)
- Soulcalibur: Broken Destiny – Kilik (uncredited)
- Soulcalibur V – Kilik
- Spectrobes: Origins – Tidy, Scout
- Star Ocean: First Departure – Cyuss Warren
- Star Ocean: The Last Hope – Grafton (uncredited)
- Stranglehold – Jerry Ying
- Tales of Legendia – Curtis (uncredited)
- Tales of Vesperia: Definitive Edition - Yuri Lowell
- Tales of Zestiria – Additional voices
- Tarr Chronicles – Additional voices
- Tom Clancy's H.A.W.X 2 – Additional voices
- Tom Clancy's Splinter Cell: Double Agent – Additional voices
- Trinity Universe – Prinny
- Ultimate Band – Alex, Alec
- Victorious Boxers 2: Fighting Spirit – Tatsuya Kimura
- Warriors Orochi – Sun Jian (uncredited)
- Wild Arms 4 – Lambda, Earthbound, Necromancer, Gob, Melchrom
- Work Time Fun – Muscle Man
- World of Final Fantasy – Warrior of Light
- World of Warcraft: Burning Crusade – Male Blood Elf
- World of Warcraft: Cataclysm – Cho'gall (right head), Cyclonas, Shannox
- World of Warcraft: Warlords of Draenor – Additional voices
- World of Warcraft: Legion – Koltira Deathweaver
- WWE SmackDown! Shut Your Mouth – Various crowd members
- Ys Seven – Additional voices
- Yoga Wii – Yoga Instructor

=== Live action ===
- Dawn of the Dead – ADR group
- Cable Girls – Carlos Cifuentes (English dub)
- Cromartie High – The Movie – Hayashida (English dub)
- Flu – Byung-ki (English dub)
- Violetta – Luca (English dub)
