= Tales to Astonish =

Science-fiction and superhero comic book series

- Cover of Tales to Astonish No. 1 (January 1959); Art by Jack Kirby and Chris Rule

Publication information
- Publisher: Marvel Comics
- Schedule: Monthly
- Format: Ongoing
- Publication date: (vol. 1); January 1959 – March 1968 (becomes The Incredible Hulk vol. 2) (vol. 2); December 1979 – January 1981
- No. of issues: (vol. 1): 101 (vol. 2): 14
- Main character(s): Ant-Man / Giant-Man and Wasp; Hulk; Namor

Creative team
- Written by: (vol. 1); Ernie Hart; Al Hartley; Leon Lazarus; Stan Lee; Larry Lieber (vol. 2); Roy Thomas
- Penciller(s): (vol. 1); Dick Ayers; Carl Burgos; Gene Colan; Steve Ditko; Bill Everett; Don Heck; Jack Kirby; Larry Lieber; Bob Powell; Paul Reinman; Marie Severin (vol. 2); John Buscema
- Inker(s): (vol. 1); George Roussos (vol. 2); Frank Giacoia

Tales to Astonish is the name of two American comic book series, and a one-shot comic, all published by Marvel Comics.

The primary title bearing that name was published from January 1959 to March 1968. It began as a science-fiction anthology that served as a showcase for such artists as Jack Kirby and Steve Ditko, then featured superheroes during the period fans and historians call the Silver Age of Comic Books. It became The Incredible Hulk with issue No. 102 (April 1968). Its sister title was Tales of Suspense.

A second Marvel comic bearing the name, reprinting stories of the undersea ruler the Sub-Mariner, ran 14 issues from December 1979 to January 1981. A superhero one-shot followed in 1994.

Reported circulation
Year	Circulation
1960	163,156
1961	184,895
1962	139,167
1963	189,390
1964	207,365
1965	224,346
1966	256,145
1967	269,132

== Publication history ==
=== Science-fiction anthology ===
Tales to Astonish and its sister publication Tales of Suspense were both launched with a January 1959 cover date. The early run of the first volume of Tales to Astonish ran from issues #1–34 (January 1959 – August 1962), initially under Atlas Comics, the 1950s forerunner of Marvel; it fell under the Marvel banner with issue No. 21 (July 1961), the first with a cover sporting the early "MC" box. It contained science-fiction mystery/suspense stories written primarily by editor-in-chief Stan Lee and his brother, Larry Lieber, with artists including Jack Kirby, Steve Ditko, Dick Ayers, Don Heck and Paul Reinman. One such story, "The Man in the Ant Hill", in No. 27 (January 1962), introduced the character Hank Pym, who would be repurposed eight issues later as the superhero Ant-Man. Anthology stories continued to appear as backups until Tales to Astonish became a superhero "split book" in 1964, when it began featuring one story each of Giant-Man and the Hulk.

=== Ant-Man, Giant-Man and the Wasp ===
Tales to Astonish No. 44 (June 1963). Cover art by Jack Kirby and Don Heck.

Following his one-shot story in No. 27 (January 1962), Hank Pym became the insect-sized hero Ant-Man in No. 35 (September 1962). The series was plotted by Lee and scripted by Lieber, with penciling first by Kirby and later by Heck and others. The Wasp was introduced as Ant-Man's costar in issue No. 44 (June 1963). Ant-Man and Pym's subsequent iteration, Giant-Man, introduced in No. 49 (November 1963), starred in 10- to 13-page and later 18-page adventures, with the rest of Tales to Astonish devoted to the anthological science fiction and fantasy stories the comic normally ran. Aside from Lee and Lieber, occasional writers included Ernie Hart, under the pseudonym H. E. Huntley, Leon Lazarus (#64, February 1965) and Al Hartley (#69, the feature's finale, July 1965). Artists of the latter part of the run included Ditko, Ayers, Carl Burgos, and Bob Powell.

The backup feature "Tales of the Wasp" (#51–56) used the superheroine as a framing device for anthological science-fiction stories, having her relate tales to hospitalized servicemen and the like. The Wasp also starred in two subsequent solo backup stories. All were scripted and penciled by Lieber.

=== Hulk and Sub-Mariner ===
The Hulk, whose original series The Incredible Hulk had been canceled after a six-issue run in 1962–63, returned to star in his own feature when Tales to Astonish became a split book at issue No. 60 (October 1964), after having guest-starred as Giant-Man's antagonist in a full-length story the previous issue. The Hulk had proven a popular guest-star in three issues of Fantastic Four and an issue of The Amazing Spider-Man. His new stories here were initially scripted by Lee and illustrated by the seldom-seen team of penciler Steve Ditko and inker George Roussos. This early part of the Hulk's run introduced the Leader, who would become the Hulk's nemesis, and this run additionally made the Hulk's identity known, initially only to the military and then later publicly. The Abomination first appeared in Tales to Astonish No. 90, and is introduced as a KGB agent and spy. Stan Lee chose the name "the Abomination," which he realized belonged to no other character, before conceiving the character's background and appearance. Lee recalled that he simply told artist Gil Kane to "make him bigger and stronger than the Hulk and we'll have a lot of fun with him."

Namor the Sub-Mariner received his first feature in a decade beginning with No. 70 (August 1965). The Golden Age character Byrrah was reintroduced in issue No. 90 (April 1967). After the final issue of Tales to Astonish (which became the solo magazine The Incredible Hulk with issue No. 102, April 1968), Namor co-starred in the split-book one-shot Iron Man and Sub-Mariner No. 1 before going on to his own 72-issue series.

Giant-Man and Wasp were featured prominently in Namor stories in issues #77-78, steering their return to the Avengers in #26 of that series. Stan Lee had originally removed all Avengers with their own series/serials from the team ten issues earlier to make continuity easier to maintain. Wasp had been at a cruise ship swimming pool when she went to alert the Avengers of Namor's activities in #77, explaining why she was dressed for swimming in The Avengers #26.

== Revivals ==
A second volume of Tales to Astonish, using the cover logo Tales to Astonish starring the Sub-Mariner, ran 14 issues (December 1979 – January 1981), reprinting edited versions of Sub-Mariner #1–14 (May 1968 – June 1969). All but the last issue ran 18-page versions of the originally 20-page stories, with panels and text reworked to condense the plot. That last issue also included three Namor pinups, one by creator Bill Everett, reprinted from Marvel Mystery Comics No. 9 (July 1940); one by penciler Jack Kirby and inker Sol Brodsky, reprinted from Fantastic Four No. 33 (December 1964); and a new one by artist Alan Weiss. Covers repurposed the original art, with the premiere issue's image flipped 180 degrees.

Tales to Astonish vol. 3 No. 1 (December 1994) was a 72-page one-shot special starring the Hulk, Namor, Ant-Man, and the Wasp in the story "Loki's Dream" by writer Peter David, with painted art by John Estes.

== Collected editions ==
The Sub-Mariner feature begins: Tales to Astonish #70 (August 1965). Cover art by Jack Kirby and Mike Esposito.

- Marvel Masterworks: Atlas Era Tales to Astonish
  - Vol. 1 collects Tales to Astonish #1–10, 272 pages, January 2006, ISBN 978-0-7851-1889-3
  - Vol. 2 collects Tales to Astonish #11–20, 272 pages, March 2008, ISBN 978-0-7851-2913-4
  - Vol. 3 collects Tales to Astonish #21–30, 272 pages, March 2010, ISBN 978-0-7851-4196-9
  - Vol. 4 collects Tales to Astonish #31–34, and material from #35–51 and No. 54, 304 pages, March 2010, ISBN 978-0-7851-5881-3
- Marvel Masterworks: Ant-Man/Giant-Man
  - Vol. 1 collects Henry Pym story in Tales to Astonish #27 and Ant-Man/Giant-Man feature in #35–52, 288 pages, March 2006 ISBN 978-0785120490
  - Vol. 2 collects Giant-Man feature in Tales to Astonish #53–69, 304 pages, February 2008, ISBN 978-0785129110
- Essential Astonishing Ant-Man Henry Pym story in Tales to Astonish No. 27 and Ant-Man/Giant-Man feature in #35–69, 576 pages, February 2002, ISBN 978-0785108221
- The Superhero Women: Featuring the Fabulous Females of Marvel Comics includes Ant-Man and the Wasp story from Tales to Astonish No. 44, 254 pages, November 1977, Simon & Schuster, ISBN 978-0671229283
- Marvel Masterworks: The Incredible Hulk
  - Vol. 2 collects Giant-Man feature in Tales to Astonish #59 and Hulk feature in #60–79, 266 pages, December 2004, ISBN 978-0785116547
  - Vol. 3 collects Hulk feature in Tales to Astonish #80–101, 288 pages, January 2006, ISBN 978-0785120322
- Essential Incredible Hulk
  - Vol. 1 includes Hulk feature in Tales to Astonish #60–91, 528 pages, February 1999, ISBN 978-0785164173
  - Vol. 2 includes Hulk feature in Tales to Astonish #92–101, 520 pages, September 2001, ISBN 978-0785164180
- The Incredible Hulk includes Hulk stories from Tales to Astonish #60–74 and No. 88, 253 pages, July 1978, Simon & Schuster, ISBN 978-0671242244
- Bring on the Bad Guys: Origins of the Marvel Comics Villains includes Hulk stories from Tales to Astonish #90–91, 253 pages, October 1976, Simon & Schuster, ISBN 978-0671223557
- Marvel Masterworks: The Sub-Mariner
  - Vol. 1 collects Sub-Mariner feature in Tales to Astonish #70–87, 224 pages, May 2002, ISBN 978-0785108757
  - Vol. 2 collects Sub-Mariner feature in Tales to Astonish #88–101, 240 pages, June 2007, ISBN 978-0785126881
- Essential Sub-Mariner Vol. 1 includes Sub-Mariner feature in Tales to Astonish #70–101, 504 pages, September 2009, ISBN 9780785130758
- Marvel's Greatest Superhero Battles includes Sub-Mariner story from Tales to Astonish No. 82, 253 pages, November 1978, Simon & Schuster, ISBN 978-0671243913

== See also ==
- Amazing Fantasy
- Strange Tales
- World of Fantasy
