= Ernie Hart =

American comic-book writer and artist (1910–1985)

- Born: Ernest Huntley Hart; October 2, 1910
- Died: May 2, 1985 or July 1985 (sources differ) (aged 74)
- Areas: Writer, Artist
- Pseudonyms: H. E. Huntley; EHH
- Notable works: Super Rabbit

Ernest Huntley Hart (October 2, 1910 – May 2, 1985 or July 1985; sources differ), also known as H. E. Huntley, was an American comic-book writer and artist best known for creating Marvel Comics' character Super Rabbit as well as co-creating the superhero The Wasp. In addition, he variously wrote, edited and illustrated numerous books on dog breeding and ownership.

== Biography ==
=== Early life and career ===
During the 1930s, Ernie Hart painted murals for the Works Progress Administration. In the following decade he joined Timely Comics, the future Marvel Comics, as part of its "animator" bullpen, separate from the superhero group that produced comics featuring the Human Torch, the Sub-Mariner and Captain America. Along with others including Vincent Fago, Jim Mooney, Mike Sekowsky, and future Mad magazine cartoonists Dave Berg and Al Jaffee, Hart worked on such movie tie-in and original talking animal comics as Terrytoons Comics, Animated Funny Comic-Tunes and Mighty Mouse.

Movie Tunes #3 (Sept. 1946), with Super Rabbit, Ziggy Pig, Silly Seal and others. Cover artist unknown.

Super Rabbit, an animal superhero in lighthearted children's adventures, debuted in Comedy Comics #14 (March 1943). Hart also worked on "Pookey the Poetical Pup" and "Ding-a-Ling the Little Bellboy" in Krazy Komics; "Wacky Willie" and "Andy Wolf & Bertie Mouse" in Terrytoons Comics; "Skip O'Hare" in Comedy Comics; and the heroic-adventure feature "Victory Boys" for Timely. Other Golden Age comics work includes "Egbert and the Count" and "Marmaduke Mouse" for Quality Comics' Hit Comics, of which one critic wrote, "Ernie Hart's 'Marmaduke Mouse' and 'Egbert' were, especially in the beginning, solidly drawn and reasonably funny, but lacked a convincing sense of action and character."

Cartoonist Al Jaffee, then a fellow Timely editor, recalled in 2004, "Ernie was a very lively guy; very funny and fun to be with. He was an editor with Don Rico, and the two of them shared an office. Both men could write and draw.... Ernie did humor work and Don edited certain titles. This was all post-World War II. One day, Stan called me in and said, 'I want you to edit the teenage books.' That may have been because Ernie left the company, because I do not recall Ernie editing anything but teenage and humor." Hart freelanced in the 1950s for that decade's Marvel predecessor, Atlas Comics, and also wrote for detective and true-crime magazines, occasionally being recruited to pose as a character on a photo-cover.

Hart also began freelance editing, illustrating, and ghostwriting for Herbert Axelrod's newly formed TFH Publications, helping produce its technical books for pet owners, and eventually joined its staff and became editor-in-chief. He drew cover art for Alan Kirk's TFH book on Scottish Terriers and Allan Easton's on Shih Tzus. In 1965, he returned to a staff position at TFH, by then based in Jersey City, New Jersey.

=== Later life and career ===
Hart remained on staff for Marvel Comics' 1950s predecessor Atlas Comics, and briefly freelanced for Marvel during the 1960s Silver Age. His '60s scripts, some of them from plots by editor-in-chief Stan Lee, included the feature "The Human Torch" in Strange Tales #110–111 (July–Aug. 1963); the feature "Ant-Man" in Tales to Astonish #44–48 (June–Oct. 1963); and the single comic Nick Fury, Agent of S.H.I.E.L.D. #8 (Jan. 1969). Hart's work also appears in the "nudie cutie" comic The Adventures of Pussycat (1968), a one-shot that reprinted some strips of the same-name feature that appeared in Marvel publisher Martin Goodman's line of men's magazines.

Hart, occasionally signing his work "EHH", also did stories for Charlton Comics, including writing and drawing issues of the horse series Rocky Lane's Black Jack in the late 1950s. In 1957, Charlton named him executive editor of its newly launched magazine Real West, centered on Old West history.

== Personal life ==
Hart was of Spanish and Portuguese heritage.

During his 1940s stint writing for Timely Comics, Hart lived in New Haven, Connecticut and commuted to New York City with his scripts. At the time he was living with his first wife and their sons, Allan (d. May 31, 1999) and Lance. When Lance was 9 years old, in the early 1950s, the family moved to Orange, Connecticut, where they built a house near a veterinary clinic run by Hart's longtime friend Leon Whitney. Partly through this connection, Hart and his son Allan eventually became beagle breeders whose dogs included the bench champion Lynnlann's Button Up. Hart continued as a freelance writer, and combining his vocations by writing and editing nonfiction books for dog-owners. He became a dog-show judge and importer of German Shepherds, and in 1960, with Charles Kaman, co-founded the nonprofit Fidelco Breeders Foundation to produce German Shepherds of "true working dog temperament and utility."

He remarried following his divorce from his first wife. He and his second wife, Kay, lived for a year on Spain's Costa del Sol, returning to the U.S. in June 1965. They then moved to Scotch Plains, New Jersey, to be closer to his work.

In 1968, Hart moved to Clearwater, Florida, He resided there at the time of his death, though his death certificate was issued in Connecticut.

While living in Florida, Hart painted and donated a 25-foot oil-on-canvas mural to the New Haven Central Hospital for Veterinary Medicine, depicting "the dog's place alongside man throughout the development of civilization. It portrays cavemen, cape hunting dogs, a policeman with a German Shepherd, hunters with pointers and setters, a little old lady with a pet, and small children playing with dogs."

== Bibliography ==
- This is the German Shepherd (TFH Publications, 1955 and subsequent 1957, 1960, 1964, 1967, 1988 and other editions). With Wil Goldbecker. ISBN 978-0876662984
- Encyclopedia of Dog Breeds (TFH Publications, 1968). ISBN 978-0876662854
- Living with Pets: A complete guide to choosing and caring for all kinds of pets (Vanguard Press, 1977). ISBN 978-0814907788
