= Yellowjacket (Marvel Comics) =

Marvel Comics characters

Publication information
- Publisher: Marvel Comics
- First appearance: The Avengers #59 (December 1968)
- Created by: Roy Thomas; John Buscema

In-story information
- Alter ego: Hank Pym; Rita DeMara; Darren Cross
- Abilities: Size-shifting; Bio-energy projection; Flight using costume "wings"; Superhuman strength; Telepathy with insects

Yellowjacket is an alias utilized by several fictional characters appearing in American comic books published by Marvel Comics.

== Fictional character biography ==
=== Hank Pym ===
Dr. Henry "Hank" Pym is the first major character to take on the Yellowjacket codename as an anti-hero after having several other superhero identities, such as Ant-Man, Giant-Man and Goliath. The character has been associated with several superhero teams in the Marvel Universe, including the Avengers and the Defenders.

=== Rita DeMara ===
Yellowjacket
- Rita DeMara as Yellowjacket. Art by Kevin West.

Publication information
- Publisher: Marvel Comics
- First appearance: The Avengers # 264 (February 1986)
- Created by: Roger Stern; John Buscema

In-story information
- Alter ego: Rita DeMara
- Species: Human
- Team affiliations: Guardians of the Galaxy; Masters of Evil; Femizons; Avengers
- Abilities: Cybernetics expert Suit grants: High-speed flight Size manipulation Electrical bolt projection via stinger blasts

Rita DeMara is the second major character to use the Yellowjacket codename who is initially a reluctant supervillain and later superhero.

The character first appeared in The Avengers #264 (February 1986), and was created by Roger Stern and John Buscema. Years later, she was featured as a regular character in the Guardians of the Galaxy and Avengers titles. Guardians of the Galaxy writer/artist Jim Valentino reminisced, "It was my group's first foray into the 20th Century. I knew they were going to meet the Masters of Evil... She was a member of the Masters of Evil at the time and I liked her. I thought it would be nice to have someone see the 31st Century through present-day eyes. It would give a new perspective, so I asked if I could have her. They said yes, and even though I never got the chance to write her in, they put her in the group after I was gone." Yellowjacket was killed off in the 1995 one-shot Avengers: The Crossing and never permanently returned. Yellowjacket was one of the featured characters in the 2011 miniseries Chaos War: Dead Avengers, where she was temporarily resurrected.

==== Criminal career ====
Rita DeMara is a reluctant supervillainess who had stolen one of Hank Pym's Yellowjacket costumes, which she modified to remove the insect emblem. Yellowjacket participates in a takeover of the Avengers Mansion, assisting the Masters of Evil as a professional criminal. Yellowjacket is defeated and sent to prison, but she is freed by Fixer with amorous intentions. She flees and tries to gain revenge on Wasp, but is distracted by Black Knight. Furious at being rejected, the Fixer tries to kill her. Black Knight helps Yellowjacket defeat the Fixer and the two part on possibly romantic terms.

During a time when no Avengers were active, Yellowjacket receives a call for help from an automated system at an old base of the Avengers. Yellowjacket, Beast, Captain, Falcon, Hercules, Hulk, and Jocasta battle the High Evolutionary, who intends to jumpstart humanity's evolution through worldwide catastrophe. Yellowjacket helps battle through the High Evolutionary's underground submarine base, fighting against dozens of his soldiers. The High Evolutionary is eventually defeated by Hercules, and the two evolving out of reality. She later briefly serves as a member of Superia's Femizons.

The Masters of Evil, led by Doctor Octopus, confront the Guardians of the Galaxy inside Avengers Mansion. Yellowjacket is soon betrayed by her side. Moments later, both teams are overwhelmed by aliens.

==== Guardians of the Galaxy ====
After being betrayed, Yellowjacket joins the Guardians of the Galaxy in the 31st century. She further proves her worth when she saved the life of Charlie-27 by shrinking, flying inside his throat, and attacking a blood clot inside his body. She forms a close friendship with Nikki. She later uses 31st century technology to redesign her Yellowjacket costume to look less like Pym's design.

She used her powers as a valued member of the team, until, homesick, she attempts to return to the 20th century. On the way, she stops in the near future and learns that a disaster was about to happen to the Avengers in her target time. On her return to the present, she is killed by Iron Man, who is under the control of Immortus.

=== Darren Cross ===
Darren Cross assumed the Yellowjacket identity following his resurrection.

== In other media ==
=== Television ===
- The Hank Pym incarnation of Yellowjacket appears in The Avengers: Earth's Mightiest Heroes, voiced by Wally Wingert.
- The Darren Cross incarnation of Yellowjacket appears in Ant-Man (2017), voiced by William Salyers.

=== Film ===
The Darren Cross incarnation of Yellowjacket appears in Lego Marvel Super Heroes: Avengers Reassembled, voiced by Travis Willingham.

=== Marvel Cinematic Universe ===
Corey Stoll as Yellowjacket as depicted in the film Ant-Man (2015).

- Darren Cross / Yellowjacket appears in the live-action Marvel Cinematic Universe (MCU) film Ant-Man (2015), portrayed by Corey Stoll.
- Alternate timeline variants of Yellowjacket appear in the Disney+ / MCU animated series What If...?:
  - The Hank Pym incarnation appears in the episode "What If... the World Lost Its Mightiest Heroes?", voiced by Michael Douglas.
  - A group of size-changing musketeers called the Royal Yellowjackets appear in the episode "What If... the Avengers Assembled in 1602?" as the royal guard of a Rennaissance-themed universe.

=== Video games ===
- The Hank Pym incarnation of Yellowjacket appears as a boss in Marvel: Ultimate Alliance 2, voiced by Wally Wingert.
- The Darren Cross incarnation of Yellowjacket appears as a boss in Marvel: Avengers Alliance.
- The Darren Cross incarnation of Yellowjacket appears as a playable character in Marvel Contest of Champions.
- The Darren Cross incarnation of Yellowjacket appears as a playable character in Marvel: Future Fight.
- The Darren Cross incarnation of Yellowjacket appears as a playable character in Lego Marvel's Avengers via DLC.
- The Hank Pym incarnation of Yellowjacket appears as a playable character in Lego Marvel Super Heroes 2.
- The Hank Pym incarnation of Yellowjacket appears in Marvel Future Revolution, voiced again by Wally Wingert.
- The Darren Cross incarnation of Yellowjacket appears in Marvel Snap.
