= Hawkeye: Blindspot =

2011 Marvel Comics limited series

'Hawkeye: Blindspot'
- Cover of Hawkeye: Blindspot #1; Art by Mike Perkins

Publication information
- Publisher: Marvel Comics
- Schedule: Monthly
- Format: Limited series
- Genre: Superhero
- Publication date: February – May 2011
- No. of issues: 4
- Main character: Hawkeye

Creative team
- Created by: Jim McCann; Paco Diaz
- Written by: Jim McCann
- Artist: Paco Diaz
- Letterer: Clayton Cowles
- Colorist: Tomeu Morey
- Editor: Tom Brennan

Hawkeye: Blindspot is a four issue comic book limited series published by Marvel Comics, starring Hawkeye. Hawkeye: Blindspot continues the storyline staged in Hawkeye & Mockingbird and Widowmaker. The series was written by Jim McCann.

== Publication history ==
Marvel first announced Hawkeye: Blindspot in November 2010 as the follow-up to four-issue miniseries Widowmaker. The Widowmaker storyline was originally scheduled to run through Hawkeye & Mockingbird issues #7 and #8, and Black Widow #9 and #10. Instead it was solicited as a stand-alone miniseries, which left the status of both titles unknown.

== Characters ==
- Hawkeye / Clint Barton: Master archer and Avenger

== Premise ==
In the wake of the shocking Widowmaker, Clint Barton is living out a fate worse than death. With his greatest skill now a terrible curse, Hawkeye will have to face down his past sins to forge a new future…but even the man with Marvel's deadliest aim can't always see what's coming!

== Reception ==
The first issue of Hawkeye: Blindspot was received with mostly positive critical reviews. Doug Zawisza of Comic Book Resources gave it 4.5 out 5 starts stating, "Whether you like what McCann has been doing with Hawkeye and Mockingbird and Widowmaker, or are just a fan of the Clint Barton character, this issue offers quite a bang for your three bucks". Jesse Schedeen of IGN was less enthused giving it a 6.5 out of 10 explaining, "Hawkeye: Blindspot doesn't get off to a wholly satisfying start. Luckily, now that the flashbacks are out of the way, there's ample room for McCann to focus the story and ramp up the conflict". Lan Pitts of Newsarama stated, "Hawkeye: Blindspot hearkens back to a simpler age of storytelling, but is hardly "simple". If you're itching for something that the current Avengers books might not be scratching, look no further than this".
