= Black Widow (Natasha Romanova) =

Marvel Comics superhero

Natasha Romanoff Black Widow
- Various incarnations of Black Widow, as depicted in Avengers Forever #2 (2022). Art by Russell Dauterman.

Publication information
- Publisher: Marvel Comics
- First appearance: Tales of Suspense #52 (April 1964)
- Created by: Stan Lee (editor/plotter); Don Rico (writer); Don Heck (artist)

In-story information
- Full name: Natalia Alianovna Romanova
- Place of origin: Soviet Union
- Team affiliations: Avengers; Champions; Heroes for Hire; KGB; Marvel Knights; Secret Avengers; S.H.I.E.L.D.
- Partnerships: Daredevil; Hawkeye; Winter Soldier
- Notable aliases: Natasha Romanoff
- Abilities: Expert markswoman and mastery of various weapons; Expert martial artist and hand-to-hand combatant; Slowed aging, and enhanced immune system; Expert spy; Equipment via gauntlets granting: Electroshock weapon; Explosives; Grappling hook; Knock out gas; Radio transmitter

Black Widow (Natalia Alianovna "Natasha Romanoff" Romanova (Russian: Наталья Альяновна "Наташа Романофф" Романова)) is a superhero appearing in American comic books published by Marvel Comics. Created by editor Stan Lee, scripter Don Rico, and artist Don Heck, the character debuted as an enemy of Iron Man in Tales of Suspense #52 (1964). She reformed into a hero in The Avengers #30 (1966) and her most well-known design was introduced in The Amazing Spider-Man #86 (1970). Black Widow has been the main character in several comic titles since 1970, receiving her own Black Widow series in 1999. She also frequently appears as a supporting character in The Avengers and Daredevil.

She is introduced as a spy for the Soviet Union until she defects to the United States. She subsequently joins the intelligence agency S.H.I.E.L.D., partners with Daredevil, and encounters a rival Black Widow in Yelena Belova. Though she has no distinct superpowers, she was augmented in the Red Room, a Soviet training facility, to increase her strength and reduce her aging. She has training in combat and espionage, and wields bracelets that fire electric shocks and project wires she uses to traverse skyscrapers.

Black Widow stories often explore her struggle to define her own identity as a spy and the trauma she endured from her life of training in the Red Room. Early stories emphasized her Soviet origin, portraying her superiors as evil and contrasting her with more noble American superheroes. Black Widow's status as a leading female character and femme fatale has influenced her portrayal, which was often contradictory as comics grappled with the conflict between traditional gender roles and second-wave feminism. The character is often sexualized both by artists and by the characters with whom she interacts.

Black Widow has been adapted into a variety of other media, including film, animated series, and video games. A version of the character was portrayed by Scarlett Johansson in the Marvel Cinematic Universe from her first appearance in Iron Man 2 (2010) to her final one in Black Widow (2021). Johansson's portrayal brought increased attention to the character and influenced Black Widow's depiction in comics.

== Publication history ==
=== 1960s ===
Tales of Suspense #52 (April 1964), the debut of Black Widow. Cover art by Jack Kirby and Paul Reinman.

Black Widow first appeared in Tales of Suspense #52 (1964) as an opponent of Iron Man. She was designed by artist Don Heck for a story plotted by Stan Lee and written by Don Rico under the pseudonym N. Korok. The character was portrayed as a seductress who was spying on Tony Stark for the Soviet government, making her one of several Soviet villains who faced Iron Man in the 1960s. She was infatuated with Tony Stark's looks and wealth and easily distracted by jewelry. Comics historian Brian Cronin has suggested that her name was a reference to Natasha Fatale from The Adventures of Rocky and Bullwinkle and Friends.

Black Widow first took the role of a supervillain in Tales of Suspense #64 (1965) after the Soviet government gave her a costume and equipment when they forced her to continue working for them. Her first costume took the form of a blue bodysuit made primarily of fishnet-style webbing, a cape, and a mask designed to resemble the one used by Hawkeye. With the costume came her first use of tactical equipment, including gloves that let her adhere to walls and the weaponized bracelets that later became her primary weapon. She was the villain in five Iron Man stories, all within a span of twelve issues.

Black Widow next appeared as the villain in Avengers #29–30 (1966), where she manipulated Hawkeye, Power Man, and Swordsman into doing her bidding. At the end of the story, she reformed and allied with the Avengers, as her love for Hawkeye motivated her to switch sides after recovering from brainwashing by the Soviet government. This made her one of several Marvel Comics villains who become good by defecting from the Soviet Union to the United States, reflecting a moral preference for American individualism over Soviet communism. Her redemption coincided with Marvel's attempt at a more nuanced portrayal of Soviets and the Cold War.

Black Widow's design underwent various changes as she appeared in the following issues of Avengers. The character's backstory was expanded in Avengers #43 (1967), when she discovered that the secret identity of the Red Guardian was her husband Alexei, who had been presumed dead. This story explained that it was because of his supposed death that she trained to be a spy. After her redemption, Black Widow became associated with the fictional intelligence agency S.H.I.E.L.D.

=== 1970s ===
Black Widow appeared in Avengers #76 (1970) to end her relationship with Hawkeye (then named Goliath), effectively making her an independent character. She then underwent a full redesign in The Amazing Spider-Man #86 (1970), where she was given the black costume and long red hair that became identified with her character. John Romita Sr. designed the costume, basing it on the 1940s Miss Fury comic strip. Marvel followed this the same year with a series of Black Widow stories published in Amazing Adventures, which also published stories about the Inhumans. Marvel's first series to feature stories led by a female superhero, it portrayed Black Widow as a wealthy jet setter who doubled as a crime-fighter. The first issues, written by Gary Friedrich and illustrated by Gene Colan, were about political issues. Writers Roy Thomas and then Gerry Conway moved it away from politics in favor of melodrama, developing the relationship between Black Widow and her father figure Ivan Petrovich. Amazing Adventures ran for eight issues before Black Widow was removed from the comic book so the Inhumans could have a standalone series.

As the writer for Daredevil, Conway introduced Black Widow as a supporting character and established a romance between her and Daredevil as "a way to re-energize the title". She joined the series in Daredevil #81 (1971). Colan illustrated the series with drawings of Black Widow that emphasized her acrobatics and long red hair. Conway credited Colan with creating the "first empowered sexy babe" in comics. This run allowed for deeper characterization for Black Widow, and she was given a last name, Romanoff, in issue #82 (1971). Her story line in the series saw her framed for killing a supervillain, with Daredevil's friend Foggy Nelson leading the prosecution. Conway then moved the setting to San Francisco, and their relationship became the main focus of the series. The pairing was one Marvel had to handle carefully given potential backlash to an unmarried couple living together, having them live on separate floors and having Ivan live with them. Responding to criticism that his treatment of Black Widow was sexist, Conway reworked her role beginning in Daredevil #91 (1972), having her stand up for herself when she felt neglected by Daredevil. The series was retitled Daredevil and the Black Widow in the following issue.

Steve Gerber became the writer for Daredevil with issue #97 (1972), and he moved the focus away from Black Widow back to Daredevil's superhero activity in response to weak sales. Her name was dropped from the title after issue #107 (1973). She appeared in Avengers #111–112 (1973), but left the team almost immediately as she wished to return to Daredevil. Jenny Blake Isabella became the writer for Daredevil with issue #118, and feeling that the relationship dynamic between Daredevil and Black Widow harmed both characters, she set out to split them apart. She departed from the series in issue #124 (1975), with the character leaving by saying that she felt overshadowed by Daredevil and that he robbed her of her independence.

When Isabella began writing The Champions, she included Black Widow as a member. Originally intended to be a duo of Iceman and Angel, editor Len Wein mandated several changes to The Champions, including the requirement of a female character. Besides her experience writing for Black Widow, Isabella used the character in hope that continuing to work with her would prevent another writer from reuniting her with Daredevil. The seventh issue of The Champions, "The Man Who Created the Black Widow", focused on Black Widow's backstory and introduced the villain Yuri Bezukhov, the son of Ivan Petrovich. Isabella wanted to continue this story by revealing Ivan to be Black Widow's biological father, but she left Marvel Comics after completing the issue. The Champions ended after 16 issues, and Black Widow was returned to Avengers in issue #173 (1978) during the "Korvac Saga". She returned to Daredevil as a supporting character in issues #155–165 (1978–1980).

=== 1980s ===
Black Widow was less prominent in the 1980s. She made an appearance in the anthology book Bizarre Adventures #25 (1981), as one of the superheroines leading a story written by Ralph Macchio and illustrated by Paul Gulacy under the issue's "Lethal Ladies" theme. The story followed Black Widow as she infiltrated a Soviet arms depot in South Africa led by her former instructor. Macchio moved away from elements he felt were reminiscent of James Bond, instead looking to the works of John le Carré for inspiration so readers "really didn't know who were the good guys and the bad guys". Black Widow made another return to Daredevil beginning in issue #187 (1982), written by Frank Miller. She was redesigned during Miller's run, giving her a more casual and androgynous appearance with a gray leotard and shorter hair. She also appeared in the shared books Marvel Two-in-One and Marvel Team-Up.

The anthology book Marvel Fanfare, issues #10–13 (1983–1984), featured Black Widow in her next solo story. Written by Macchio and illustrated by George Pérez with other artists, this story had her pursue Ivan on behalf of S.H.I.E.L.D. before discovering that he had been brainwashed. Macchio and Pérez had begun working on the story in 1978, but its intended publication was cancelled twice, in Marvel Premiere and then Marvel Spotlight. Macchio made it explicit in this run that Black Widow killed adversaries when necessary and obtained information from another character by having sex with him, portraying things that were usually left ambiguous in comic books at the time.

=== 1990s ===
Black Widow appeared in three entries of the Marvel Graphic Novel line in the 1990s. Black Widow: The Coldest War (1990) is the 61st entry in the series, featuring Black Widow as she is tricked into believing that her husband is alive and is forced to work for the Soviet Union to save him. Punisher/Black Widow: Spinning Doomsday's Web (1992) is the 74th entry in the series and features Black Widow working with the Punisher to defeat Malum. Daredevil/Black Widow: Abattoir (1993) is the 75th and final entry in the series, featuring Black Widow and Daredevil as they investigate the murders of telepaths. She then starred in a separate graphic novel, Fury/Black Widow: Death Duty (1995). Although she shares the title with Nick Fury, he only briefly appears in the book, and she instead teams with Night Raven in his first appearance in Marvel's mainline continuity.

Black Widow appeared in a flashback story in Uncanny X-Men #268 (September 1990), in which she teams up with Captain America and Wolverine against Hydra. Black Widow returned to her black jumpsuit in the 1990s and began working alongside Iron Man during the run of writer John Byrne and artist Paul Ryan, beginning in Iron Man #269 (1991). She again became a member of the Avengers with its new roster in Avengers #343 (1992). This led to her becoming the leader of the Avengers for a period of time. Her association with the Avengers increased her prominence among Marvel superheroes, allowing for appearances in Captain America and Force Works. Black Widow returned to Daredevil in issue #362 (1997), which had her become more vengeful as she responded to the Onslaught event that caused the apparent deaths of her allies in the Avengers. She reappeared in the new volume of the Avengers, but only infrequently as a guest character. Black Widow then starred in a three-issue arc, "The Fire Next Time", by writer Scott Lobdell and penciller Randy Green, in Journey into Mystery #517–519 (1998). At the same time, writer Kevin Smith had her return to Daredevil during the first storyline of its second volume. Black Widow's Marvel Fanfare story was reprinted as a single volume in 1999, titled Black Widow: Web of Intrigue.

A new character, Yelena Belova, took the moniker Black Widow beginning in Inhumans #5 (1999). The two Black Widows came into conflict in the limited series Black Widow published the same year, which was written by Devin Grayson and illustrated by J. G. Jones, running for three issues. The series was part of the Marvel Knights imprint and encompassed a single story, "The Itsy-Bitsy Spider". This was the first time a comic book series featured Black Widow as its sole main character; the only other title to do this was her standalone 1990 graphic novel.

=== 2000s ===
Grayson wrote a second three-issue Black Widow miniseries featuring the Natasha and Yelena Black Widows in 2001, alongside co-writer Greg Rucka and artist Scott Hampton. Black Widow returned to Daredevil in its "The Widow" storyline (2004) by writer Brian Michael Bendis and artist Alex Maleev. Richard K. Morgan wrote Black Widow: Homecoming in 2004 with Bill Sienkiewicz and Goran Parlov, simplifying Black Widow's backstory into a consistent series of events. The series featured a more violent Black Widow and ran for six issues. Morgan then wrote another six-issue series, Black Widow: The Things They Say About Her, in 2006 with Sienkiewicz and Sean Phillips. This continued from the previous series and followed Black Widow as she went on the run from S.H.I.E.L.D. An alternate version of Black Widow was created for the Ultimate Universe in the 2000s, where she is a member of the Ultimates.

Black Widow: Deadly Origin ran in 2009–2010, written by Paul Cornell and illustrated by Tom Raney and John Paul Leon. The series followed Black Widow's history through flashbacks from different points in her life. The reimaginings of her earlier adventures had her wearing more modest costumes relative to her original appearances.

=== 2010s ===
Black Widow became more widely known to the public after the character was adapted to film in Iron Man 2 (2010). The film's emphasis on her as a spy instead of a superhero influenced how she was portrayed in comics over the following years. With the character's popularity came additional publications, such as Black Widow and the Marvel Girls (2010), which was created by Salvador Espin, Veronica Gandini, Takeshi Miyazawa, and Paul Tobin.

Black Widow received a new volume, beginning with the "Name of the Rose" (2010) story arc. It was written by Marjorie Liu and illustrated by Daniel Acuña, the latter creating art influenced by film noir. The series was then transferred to writer Duane Swierczynski and artist Manuel Garcia for the "Kiss and Kill" story arc. Jim McCann wrote the Widowmaker limited series in 2010 with artist David López. The series was a crossover between Black Widow and the ongoing Hawkeye & Mockingbird series. Black Widow appeared as a main character in Avengers Assemble, which debuted in 2012 to coincide with the Avengers film. She was also a main character in the 2013 Secret Avengers series.

A new Black Widow series was published under the Marvel Now! branding in 2014, created by Nathan Edmondson and Phil Noto. This series returned to Grayson's characterization of Black Widow as more introspective than action-oriented. It was the longest running Black Widow series with 20 issues, ending in 2015 with the Secret Wars event. Black Widow: Forever Red, a young adult novel featuring the Marvel Cinematic Universe version of Black Widow, was written by Margaret Stohl and released in 2015.

The next volume of Black Widow was introduced in 2016, written by Mark Waid and illustrated by Chris Samnee. These stories followed the lead of the cinematic version, exploring her work with S.H.I.E.L.D. and her experiences in the Red Room. Waid's series ran for twelve issues. Horror writers Jen and Sylvia Soska wrote a Black Widow miniseries in 2019 with artist Flaviano, and Jody Houser wrote the five issue series Web of Black Widow the same year, with Stephen Mooney as its artist.

=== 2020s ===
Ralph Macchio joined artist Simon Buonfantino in a return to Black Widow with Black Widow: Widow's Sting in 2020. The one-shot comic was written as a more traditional spy drama, using many of the genre's common tropes. Kelly Thompson began writing a Black Widow series the same year, with Elena Casagrande as the volume's artist. The series was split into three-story arcs: "The Ties that Bind" introduced a brainwashed Black Widow who believed she lived a domestic life as a mother, "I Am the Black Widow" continued the story with her memory returned and a new team of sidekicks and partners fighting alongside her, and "Die by the Blade" concluded the 15-issue series with Black Widow and her team fighting a human-trafficking ring.

Black Widow's character underwent a major redesign in Venom #26 (2023) when she became the host of a symbiote. She was given a new costume designed by CAFU, based on the appearance of Venom. The symbiote version of Black Widow made appearances in Thunderbolts by Collin Kelly, Jackson Lanzing, and Geraldo Borges, and then in Black Widow & Hawkeye by writer Stephanie Phillips and artist Paolo Villaneli. As a symbiote host, Black Widow became a major character in the "Venom War" storyline. Her role in the story was introduced in the one shot Black Widow: Venomous, written by Erica Schultz and illustrated by Luciano Vecchio. She also appeared in a three-issue limited series, Venom War: Venomous, in late 2024, also created by Schultz and Vecchio.

== Characterization ==
=== Fictional character biography ===
Black Widow's first costume, modeled after Hawkeye's, introduced in Tales of Suspense #64 (January 1965); art by Don Heck.

Natalia "Natasha" Alianovna Romanova was born in Russia. She was thrown from a burning building in Stalingrad as an infant, where she is found and raised by the soldier Ivan Petrovich. The Hand attempts to kidnap and brainwash her in 1941, but she is rescued by Captain America and Wolverine. Natasha marries Alexei Shostakov, but the KGB fakes his death to motivate Natasha to become a spy. She is trained in a Soviet spy facility, the Red Room, where she is augmented through biotechnology; the process brings her body to its physical peak and slows cellular degeneration, enabling her to remain young and in her prime for decades. The training program also gives her false memories of her life, leading her to believe that she had previously been a ballerina. She was selected from the participants in the training program to become a spy and receives the codename "Black Widow".

Natasha goes to the United States to seduce Iron Man and later to fight the Avengers. After she stops cooperating, she is brainwashed by the Soviet government until her love for Hawkeye breaks through and causes her to reform. Although she considers joining the Avengers, she is not immediately trusted by the team. Natasha instead begins working with the intelligence agency S.H.I.E.L.D. and appears to betray the Avengers when she works as a double agent for the agency, causing her relationship with Hawkeye to end.

Natasha becomes an independent crime-fighter until she begins a relationship with Daredevil. After she is framed for murder and clears her name, Natasha moves in with Daredevil in San Francisco. She eventually leaves him and spends time alone in San Francisco in severe poverty. Natasha then becomes a Russian language instructor at UCLA and joins the short-lived superhero team the Champions, who appoint her as team leader. After the Champions disband, Natasha encounters the Hand, who poison her. Natasha dies as she reaches Daredevil to ask him for help, but one of his allies, Stone of the Chaste, brings her back to life. The KGB forces Natasha to work for them again by creating a Life Model Decoy of her deceased husband, acting as if he had survived and was being held hostage. She again worked for the KGB unwillingly when she discovered that she was a sleeper agent who had been programmed to obey upon activation.

After many instances of joining and leaving, Natasha becomes the leader of the Avengers alongside Black Knight. She is forced to dissolve the Avengers after most members are seemingly killed by Onslaught, but considering herself the last Avenger, she teams up with Daredevil to hunt the Avengers' enemies. Still feeling guilty for their failure, she chooses not to rejoin as a long-term member when the Avengers returned. While tracking a biotoxin, Natasha comes into conflict with another Black Widow, Yelena Belova, and both try to prove themselves as worthy of the title. Afterward, Natasha learns that there were many Black Widows and that the KGB had implanted false memories in her about her life before she was a spy.

As Norman Osborn takes power over S.H.I.E.L.D.'s successor organization H.A.M.M.E.R., Natasha disguises herself as Yelena on the orders of Nick Fury to infiltrate Osborn's Thunderbolts team. This Nick Fury is discovered to be a Life Model Decoy created by Osborn, and Natasha escapes to help Maria Hill revive Tony Stark, who had previously wiped his own mind. When Tony Stark becomes director of S.H.I.E.L.D., Black Widow operates alongside Bucky Barnes as he becomes the new Captain America.

When Hydra is in control of the American government, Black Widow is killed by an alternate version of Captain America working for Hydra. She is then reborn as a clone in a new Red Room, retaining all of her previous memories up to her death. Natasha spends a period of time brainwashed into believing that she lived a domestic life with a fiancé and a son. After recovering, she discovers and bonds with a symbiote in an Alchemax lab.

=== Personality and motivation ===
As a superhero, Black Widow seeks to right the wrongs she committed earlier in life. Despite this, she is more willing to kill adversaries than most superheroes and has been described as emotionally cold since her first appearance. She is naturally independent and capably works alone. Black Widow is confident in her physical attractiveness and is willing to use it to her advantage. She chooses not to wear a mask, which she sees as a statement of confidence in herself, though in her early crime-fighting stories she was uncertain about whether she would regret letting others see her face. Black Widow was less confident overall in the early days of her superhero career.

As Black Widow regularly takes up alter egos and false personas as a spy, the character struggles to define her own identity. When preparing to write for Black Widow in 1999, Grayson decided that the character would need "tremendous strength and resolve" to have an identity of her own. This identity crisis grew when Black Widow discovered that many of her memories, including the loss of her husband and her time as a professional ballerina, were faked by the Soviet Union.

=== Abilities and equipment ===
Black Widow was trained as a spy in the Red Room, and she possesses expert knowledge about the practice of espionage. She uses her physical attractiveness to her advantage as a spy, manipulating others through seduction. Unlike many superheroes, Black Widow does not have superhuman powers. Instead, she underwent biochemical modification while training in the Red Room, increasing her physical prowess and slowing her aging. Black Widow is a master of hand-to-hand combat, with training in aikido, boxing, judo, karate, and savate. She also has training in most weapons and can operate most vehicles. Outside of combat, Black Widow is a gymnast, and she was taught ballet while in the Red Room. She is fluent in Chinese, English, French, German, and Russian, among other languages. As of the "Venom War" storyline, Black Widow has the powers of a symbiote host.

In combat, Black Widow uses a pair of bracelets that conceal her equipment, operated by galvanic sensors connected to the muscles in her wrists. When her primary design was established in 1970, they were equipped with tear gas pellets, a "widow's line" wire to swing between buildings like Spider-Man and a "widow's bite" electroshock weapon. The widow's bite has a range of 20 feet and can emit up to 30,000 volts. The bracelets also function as radio transmitters. Besides her bracelets, Black Widow sometimes carries explosives in her belt. The fingers and feet of her outfit contain microscopic suction cups that adhere to surfaces with an electrostatic charge.

== Themes and motifs ==
=== Communism and Russophobia ===
Black Widow was first introduced as a Soviet communist, and her origin is defined by the Cold War. As a communist spy, she was a foil for Iron Man and his symbolic representation of American values, with the danger that Black Widow posed demonstrating the threat posed by the Soviet Union and communism. Moreover, her role as a spy suggested a sense of dishonesty and deceit from Soviets that contrasted with Iron Man's role as a noble and selfless American; Black Widow was surprised to see Iron Man risk his life to save Soviets, suggesting that such morality was unfamiliar to the Soviet Union. When Black Widow chose to stop working for her Soviet handlers, they forced her to continue, first by threatening her parents and then by brainwashing her, symbolizing the Soviet Union's image as a country without liberty. With her defection to the United States, Marvel reinforced its interpretation of Black Widow as an agent of good through her work with American superheroes, which stood in contrast to her villainous period with the Soviet Union.

Black Widow's Soviet origin invokes a traumatic history for the character, reminiscent of the Soviet Union's history; her surname, Romanova, invites comparison to the Romanov family that was killed during the Russian Revolution, drawing parallels of suffering at the hands of the Soviets. Her superiors in the Soviet government were portrayed as evil, and she was shown to fear them more than she feared her adversaries. Black Widow was drawn as beautiful in contrast to the typically brutish and ugly portrayal of Soviets in Marvel Comics, suggesting innocence among the Soviets and making her more appealing to the reader. Femme fatale characters frequently have origins in Russia, and Black Widow's rejection of American gender roles in the 1960s reflected the otherness that she represented as an agent of the Soviet Union.

Ballet is commonly associated with Russia, and it has a specific association with discipline in the Russian Empire through the military and the royal court. The blending of ballet and military training draws upon the cultural competition of the Cold War. Images of Black Widow alongside many identical ballerinas invokes the lack of individualism she faced in the Soviet Union. This theme is further explored when the Red Room creates clones of her.

=== Feminism and sexuality ===
Black Widow was the first solo female superhero created by Marvel Comics. Unlike most superheroines in the 1960s, she was not created to be a love interest or a female derivative of a male character, and she was not created to fulfill a motherly or domestic role. Black Widow further contrasted herself from other female Marvel characters in the 1960s by fighting her enemies in hand-to-hand combat. The character was created in a time of uncertainty around gender roles in the United States, as a growing feminist movement competed with traditional femininity. By the 1980s, differing cultural expectations of women meant that her portrayals varied significantly between these two focuses. Sometimes, Black Widow subverts gender roles, being the more ruthless figure that stands in contrast with the more empathetic male characters. Her characterization as a woman who rejects domesticity and poses a danger to men is representative of the female black widow spider, which kills and eats its male partner; in her first appearance, Black Widow is likened to the exotic dancer and alleged spy Mata Hari. Despite this, other aspects of Black Widow remain in alignment with traditional gender roles, including her practice as a ballerina and her portrayal as a victim of trauma.

Throughout her 20th-century appearances, Black Widow was primarily defined by the men around her. When she was a villain, Black Widow's motivation was to honor her husband who had been presumed dead. This, along with her relationships with Iron Man and Hawkeye, meant that all of her actions were defined by the men in her life. This trend continued when she reformed as a superhero, an action she took because of her love for Hawkeye, and then in her relationship with Daredevil. This was part of a common theme in various media during the 1960s where femme fatale characters were redeemed through a romantic interest. From the 1970s through the 1990s, Black Widow suffered what was described as the "widow's curse", in which she was unable to maintain relationships with men because they kept dying. Her character's publication was also dependent on male characters, as her departure as a co-star of Daredevil meant that he retained a standalone series but she did not.

Black Widow was heavily sexualized during her 1970 run in Amazing Adventures, with frequent depictions of her changing outfits or wearing lingerie. A recurring gag developed in which she changed in the backseat of her car while warning her driver "eyes front, Ivan". She was one of many female action heroes to follow a trend in the 1970s where strong women were portrayed as traditionally attractive, as writers tried to appease both the target male demographic and the feminist movement. As part of the Black Widow program, Natasha's body was modified to make her infertile and to give her a permanent hourglass figure. Her sexuality was emphasized more explicitly when she appeared in Daredevil and other series over the following decades, as characters routinely commented on her sexual attractiveness. Her sex appeal was featured prominently in the artwork for Daredevil, and she frequently wore revealing clothing when not in costume. Her role in the series also relegated her to being a damsel in distress.

== Supporting characters ==
Black Widow was introduced as an enemy of Iron Man. Hawkeye was Black Widow's ally and love interest in her 1960s appearances, working with her to fight Iron Man. The Widow reformed so she can be with him in the United States. They inverted the traditional gender roles, with Black Widow having the power in their relationship while Hawkeye played the role of a dependent love interest. As they aligned with the Avengers, Black Widow was initially rebuffed due to her history as a Soviet spy. She worked with Angel, Ghost Rider, Hercules, and Iceman as part of the Champions. Black Widow and Hercules began a romance, but as an immortal he did not have interest in a long-term relationship with a mortal. Black Widow has also worked with Spider-Man, at one point expressing romantic interest in him in Marvel Team-Up #82–85 (1979).

Black Widow was fostered as a child by Ivan Petrovich, who supported her superhero career by acting as her chauffeur. He was initially portrayed as a father figure throughout her childhood, but newer accounts of Black Widow's history place her in training under the Soviet government for much of this time. Other portrayals removed the father figure aspect and gave them a flirtatious relationship. Ivan accompanied her until he became a cyborg and went insane, forcing her to kill him. Black Widow was previously married to the Red Guardian through an arranged marriage. He was believed dead, and he later sacrificed himself to save her. Bucky Barnes was one of Natasha's instructors in the Red Room while he was the Winter Soldier, and they were romantically involved while working together for the Soviet government. After the Secret Invasion, Black Widow worked alongside Bucky, who had taken the title of Captain America after the death of Steve Rogers. The two grew closer and began a new romance.

Many of Black Widow's enemies, such as Damon Dran and Bullseye, come from her time working alongside Daredevil. She has come into conflict with the Hand several times throughout her life and was at one point killed by them before being revived. Black Widow finds a counterpart and rival in Yelena Belova, another Black Widow. Yelena's relative youth causes Natasha to question her role as a Black Widow as she ages.

=== Daredevil ===
It was my idea to team up Daredevil and the Black Widow, mainly because I was a fan of Natasha, and thought she and Daredevil would have interesting chemistry. I'm not sure what I based this on, other than my desire to bring the characters together. I'm a sucker for redheads!

— Gerry Conway

Black Widow became closely associated with Daredevil in the 1970s, first as a recurring character in his series in 1971 and then as a main character alongside him when they began a romantic relationship. She altered the dynamic of Daredevil's character, who had previously had one specific love interest in Karen Page. Unlike Karen, Black Widow supported Daredevil's superhero activity, complementing this aspect of his character and making him more confident.

Daredevil took a domineering role in their relationship, and the couple were sometimes physically abusive toward one another. It was ultimately detrimental to both characters' lives, with Black Widow growing dependent on Daredevil. Though Black Widow was written out of the series after leaving him in 1975, they got back together in 1978 until he left her for Heather Glenn in 1980. When this relationship became unhealthy, Daredevil's friend Foggy Nelson enlisted Black Widow to break them up. After their romantic involvement, Black Widow and Daredevil remained friends and continued relying on each other as superheroes.

== Reception ==
Black Widow was not well known in popular culture until she was adapted to film in Iron Man 2 (2010). After her film appearances began, the character developed a strong fan base and became a focal point for calls of greater prominence of female comic book characters. Darren Franich of Entertainment Weekly described her as "THE Avengers B-lister, full stop". Andrea Towers of Polygon cited Black Widow's grounded values of empathy and loyalty as keeping the character relevant amid her inconsistent publication. Writer Gerry Conway cited his work with Black Widow as his inspiration when he created Cinder and Ashe for DC Comics.

Psychologist and popular culture writer Sherry Ginn praised Black Widow as a strong female role model, though other commentators have challenged this based on her history as a villain and depictions of the character as a damsel in distress. Portrayals of Black Widow have been criticized as sexist, as she has often worn revealing outfits and played a subservient role to male characters. This was especially true of Gerry Conway's depiction of her in Daredevil before he updated her role and granted her more autonomy. Black Widow's costume and design have been praised by comic writer Nathan Edmondson and Black Widow actress Scarlett Johansson, who describe it as empowering the character and giving her legitimacy as a superhero. This contrasts with her original costume from the 1960s, which Alan Kistler of The Mary Sue described as "a wee bit silly, even for the Silver Age of comics".

Several Black Widow stories have received critical praise. "The Itsy-Bitsy Spider" (1999) and "Homecoming" (2004–2005) were celebrated for their exploration of the spy thriller genre. Her "Web of Intrigue" (1983) appearances in Marvel Fanfare and her Deadly Origin (2010) series received praise for their artwork, with the latter standing out for its contrasting art styles by Tom Raney and John Paul Leon in the flashback and present-day segments. The positive reception toward the Marvel Fanfare appearances have led to multiple republications in standalone volumes.

== In other media ==
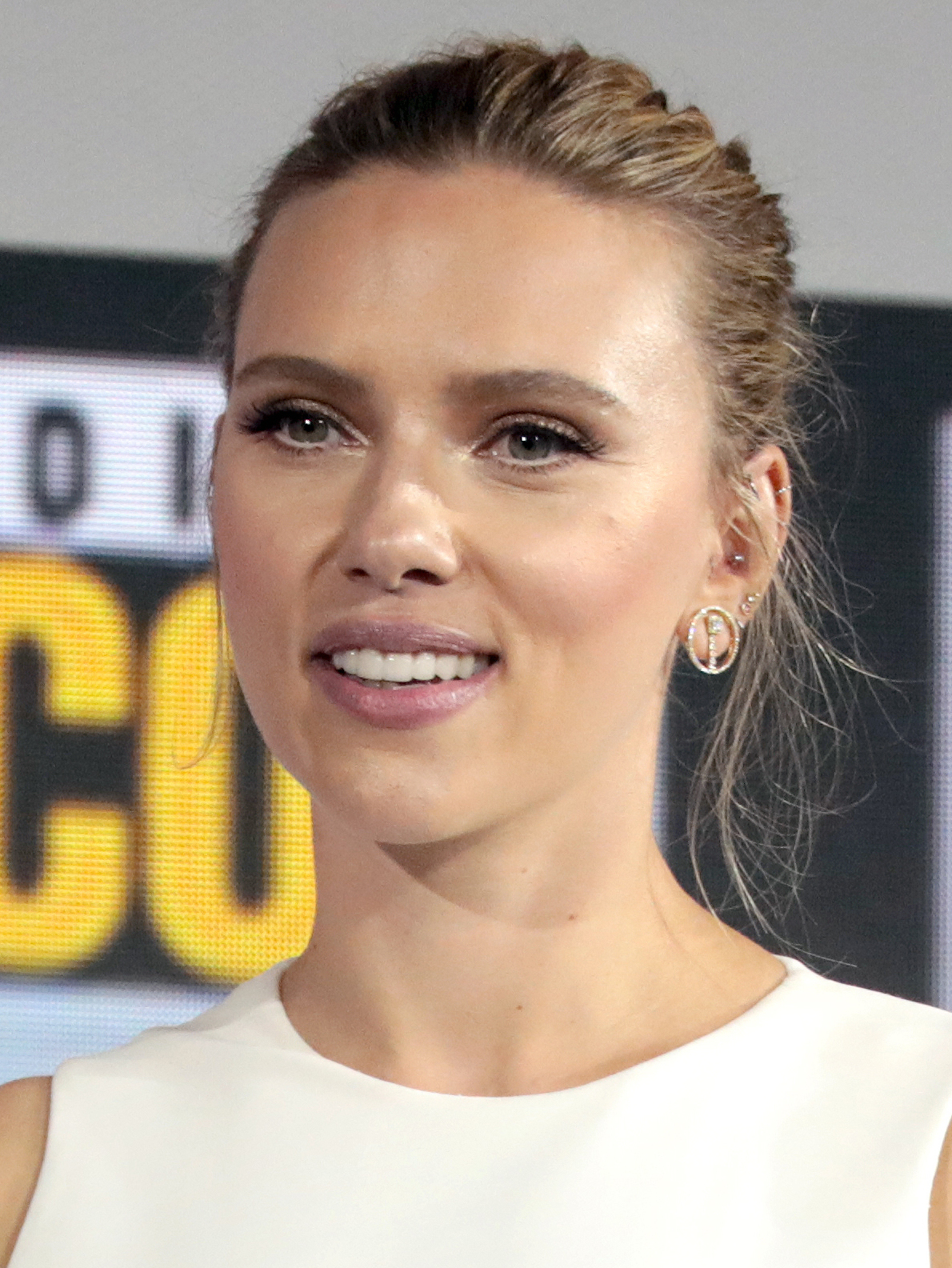
Scarlett Johansson (pictured in 2019) portrays Black Widow in the Marvel Cinematic Universe.

In 1975, Angie Bowie wished to make a film or television series starring herself as Black Widow. The idea came while she was having lunch with Stan Lee, and he sold her the film rights for one dollar. Bowie had costumes made and cast Ben Carruthers as Daredevil, but she was unable to get funding for the project and its production only went as far as test photography.

With the success of the animated television show Spider-Man and His Amazing Friends in the 1980s, a Black Widow show was considered as one of several possible follow ups. In 1996, a Black Widow television film was written by Mel Friedmen and Christopher Cosby for Fox Broadcasting Company. The script depicted Black Widow as a magazine publisher with a double-life as a crime-fighter, having her fight a crime syndicate called Octopus that killed her father. Marvel Studios and Lionsgate Films collaborated on a possible film adaptation written by David Hayter, but a series of poorly-performing action movies starring women in the mid-2000s caused Lionsgate to back out of the project.

A film adaptation of Black Widow appears in the Marvel Cinematic Universe, played by Scarlett Johansson. She first appeared as a supporting character in Iron Man 2 (2010) and reprised the role in The Avengers (2012), Captain America: The Winter Soldier (2014), Avengers: Age of Ultron (2015), Captain America: Civil War (2016), Avengers: Infinity War (2018), and Avengers: Endgame (2019) before taking a leading role in Black Widow (2021). She was voiced by Lake Bell in What If...? (2021–2024) and X-Men '97 (2026).

Black Widow has been adapted in several video games and animated television series based on Marvel Comics properties. The character is frequently voiced by Laura Bailey, who has portrayed Black Widow in animated series such as Avengers Assemble (2013) and Spider-Man (2017) as well as video games such as Lego Marvel Super Heroes (2013), Marvel Ultimate Alliance 3: The Black Order (2019), Marvel's Avengers (2020), and Marvel Rivals (2024). Other voice actresses for Black Widow include Olivia d'Abo in the film Ultimate Avengers (2006), Lena Headey in The Super Hero Squad Show (2009), and Vanessa Marshall in The Avengers: Earth's Mightiest Heroes (2010).

== See also ==
- List of Russian superheroes
- List of Marvel Comics superhero debuts
