= Barney Barton =

- Barney Barton / Trickshot. Artwork from Hawkeye: Blindspot #2 (March 2011). Art by Paco Diaz.

Publication information
- Publisher: Marvel Comics
- First appearance: As Barney Barton: The Avengers #64 (May 1969); As Trickshot: Hawkeye: Blindspot #3 (June 2011)
- Created by: Roy Thomas (writer); Gene Colan (artist)

In-story information
- Alter ego: Charles Bernard "Barney" Barton
- Species: Human
- Team affiliations: Dark Avengers; FBI
- Notable aliases: Trickshot; Hawkeye
- Abilities: Skilled hand to hand combatant; Uses a variety of trick arrows; Proficient marksman; Highly skilled archer; Exceptional athlete

Charles Bernard "Barney" Barton is a character appearing in American comic books published by Marvel Comics. Created by Roy Thomas and Gene Colan, the character first appeared in The Avengers #64 (May 1969). Barney Barton is the older brother and a recurring antagonist of superhero Clint Barton / Hawkeye.

== Publication history ==
Barney Barton debuted in The Avengers #64 (May 1969), created by writer Roy Thomas and artist Gene Colan. He later appeared in the 1983 Hawkeye series, by Mark Gruenwald. He appeared in the 1987 Solo Avengers series, by Tom DeFalco. He appeared in the 2003 Hawkeye series, by Fabian Nicieza. He appeared in the 2009 Dark Avengers series, by Brian Michael Bendis. He later appeared under the codename Trickshot in the 2011 Hawkeye: Blindspot series, by Jim McCann. He appeared in the 2010 The Avengers series, by Brian Michael Bendis.

== Fictional character history ==
Barney Barton was born in Waverly, Iowa. He lost both his parents at a young age when his father, an abusive alcoholic, lost control of his car and collided with a tree. Barney and his younger brother Clint Barton were sent to an orphanage. They stayed there for six years before running away to join the Carson Carnival of Travelling Wonder as roustabouts. The Swordsman, a member of the carnival with a popular swordplay act, selected Clint to be his new assistant. Feeling overlooked, Barney became jealous and bitter. Later, when Clint was severely injured at the hands of the Swordsman for discovering his embezzlement scheme, Barney condemned his brother for not remaining loyal to his mentor. Barney, having had enough of the carnival, decided to enlist in the army. He suggested that Clint should join him and make a fresh start. Clint declined his offer. Barney told his brother that the offer still stood, and he would wait for him if he changed his mind. The next morning, Barney stood at the bus depot, waiting and hoping his brother would change his mind. When Clint did not show up, a sorrowful Barney got on the bus and left his old life behind. As the bus was departing, Clint arrived, having changed his mind. However, he was too late.

Barney later became an FBI agent. His first assignment was to work undercover as a bodyguard for a criminal called Marko. Unbeknownst to him, Clint and his new mentor Trick Shot attempted to rob the criminal's mansion. Barney was shot with an arrow by Clint. When Clint learned what he had done, he refused to leave his brother's side and turned against Trickshot. Trickshot wounded Clint with an arrow and left.

His next undercover assignment was to pose as a racketeer. He was approached by Egghead, who offered Barney a place on his villainous space-station in exchange for funds. When Barney declined the offer, Egghead (actually a robot sent by the real Egghead) attacked him. With his bodyguards slain, Barney went to the Avengers (whose ranks included his brother using the identity of Goliath) to help stop the supervillain. Barney and the Avengers battled Egghead and his robot soldiers inside the villain's space-station. During the battle, Barney sacrificed his life to destroy Egghead's deadly ray-projector. After the funeral, Clint received a letter from FBI agent Allan Scofield revealing Barney's double life. The letter also revealed that Barney was aware of Clint's double life.

Unknown to Hawkeye and the Avengers, Barney's body was stolen by Egghead. Egghead discovered that Barney was still displaying faint vital signs and placed him in a healing chamber. Later, Egghead was inadvertently killed by Hawkeye in a battle with the Avengers, leaving Barney suspended and forgotten in the healing chamber. He was later discovered by Helmut Zemo. Zemo, who held a personal grudge against Hawkeye, manipulated Barney to turn against his brother. Barney and his new "benefactor" enlisted Hawkeye's former mentor Trick Shot (whose cancer had returned) to train him to be as proficient with a bow and arrow as his brother. Once the training was completed, Trick Shot was badly beaten and his cancer was allowed to fester. Barney then delivered the dying Trick Shot to Avengers Tower as a message to Hawkeye. Later, while investigating his former mentor's death, Hawkeye was ambushed by his brother. Declaring himself the new "Trickshot", Barney subdued Hawkeye and delivered him to Baron Zemo. Zemo had the brothers duel to the death. Hawkeye (despite going blind from a previous injury with the third Ronin) managed to best Barney in battle. Before teleporting away, Zemo transferred Barney's criminal funds over to the "victor" Hawkeye, then taunted the hero for turning his brother against him. In custody, Barney agreed to a bone marrow transplant to save his brother's sight, but only so he could battle Hawkeye again in the future.

Norman Osborn later faked Barney's death in his hospital bed as Norman invited Barney to join his second incarnation of the Dark Avengers. Despite the new team's initial success, he was finally defeated in a fight with Mockingbird when he underestimated her capabilities, as Mockingbird had been enhanced by the Super Soldier Serum and Infinity Formula. After being arrested, Barney and the rest of the villains (save for Superia and Gorgon) are offered reduced sentences in exchange for signing on with the Thunderbolts program. Barney remains with the team until the Dark Avengers escape their handlers and disband.

Sometime after the dissolution of the group, the homeless and disheveled Barney goes to live with Clint, with whom he apparently reconciled, at his new apartment.

As part of the All-New All-Different Marvel, it is revealed that Barney had stolen Clint's wealth and moved to a private island to start a family with Simone, one of Clint's former neighbors. Despite all of this, the two brothers remain on good terms. He even assisted Clint and Kate Bishop in rescuing the Project Communion kids from Hydra and S.H.I.E.L.D.

== Powers and abilities ==
Barney Barton is a highly trained former FBI agent and is a proficient marksman, exceptional athlete and skilled hand-to-hand combatant with incredible reflexes. He was later trained by Buck Chisholm, the same man who trained Hawkeye, to become a highly skilled archer displaying uncanny accuracy. As Trickshot, Barney uses a variety of razor-sharp arrows, including trick arrows such as explosive arrows and bola arrows.

== Reception ==
=== Critical response ===
Brenton Stewart of Comic Book Resources stated, "Trickshot's love/hate relationship with Hawkeye defined much of his appearances in the comics. He later appeared as a member of a Dark Avengers team where his insecurities over his unfavorable comparison to his brother dominated his character, and ultimately, that is exactly what gets at the heart of what is great about the character. It's hard enough for the world to spare much love for the world's greatest archer, but the world's secondgreatest archer gets even less. But what already works so well in the comics would work even better in the MCU where Trickshot could truly shine." Jordan Iacobucci of Screen Rant wrote, "If the MCU intends on adapting the Dark Avengers storyline with its Thunderbolts, Barney Barton is an excellent choice, as his addition could both enliven Clint Barton's character arc, as well as inform a potential second season of Hawkeye, which is rumored to be in development. The character is one major piece of Clint's story yet to be adapted for the MCU, who should reunite with his brother before Jeremy Renner's inevitable exit from the franchise."

Screen Rant included Barney Barton in their "Hawkeye's 10 Best Relationships In Marvel Comics" list, and in their "10 Comic Book Thunderbolts That Should Join The MCU Team" list. Comic Book Resources included Barney Barton in their "10 Marvel Characters We Hope to See in the MCU's Phase 4" list, and ranked him 2nd in their "Marvel: 10 Characters Baron Zemo Created In The Comics" list, and 4th in their "Marvel: 15 Best Hawkeye Villains" list.
