= Widowmaker (Marvel Comics) =

Marvel Comics limited series

- Cover of Widowmaker #1 (December 2010) by Jae Lee.

Publication information
- Publisher: Marvel Comics
- Schedule: Bi-weekly
- Format: Limited series
- Genre: Superhero
- Publication date: December 2010 – January 2011
- No. of issues: 4
- Main characters: Black Widow; Hawkeye; Mockingbird

Creative team
- Created by: Jim McCann; Duane Swierczynski; David Lopez; Manuel Garcia
- Written by: Jim McCann; Duane Swierczynski
- Penciller(s): David Lopez; Manuel Garcia
- Inker(s): Alvaro Lopez; Lorenzo Ruggiero
- Letterer(s): Cory Petit; Nate Piekos
- Colorist(s): Nathan Fairbairn; Jim Charalampidis
- Editors: Rachel Pinnelas; Charlie Beckerman; Bill Rosemann; Ralph Macchio

Hawkeye & Mockingbird/Black Widow: Widowmaker (originally published simply as Widowmaker) is a four-issue comic book limited series published by Marvel Comics starring superheroes Black Widow, Hawkeye and Mockingbird. Widowmaker continues the storyline staged in Hawkeye & Mockingbird #6 by Hawkeye & Mockingbird creators Jim McCann and David Lopez and the Black Widow creative team of writer Duane Swierczynski and artist Manuel Garcia.

== Publication history ==
In July 2010, Marvel Comics announced that Hawkeye & Mockingbird writer Jim McCann and Black Widow writer Duane Swierczynski will be collaborating on Widow Maker, a four-part crossover that will take place in Hawkeye & Mockingbird #7-8 and Black Widow #9-10 starting in December 2010 and running through January 2011. The idea for a crossover was originally incepted when the writers found out that their respective titles would be launching around the same time. McCann explained, "It's a logical crossover; there is a shared history between Hawkeye and Black Widow, the books operate in the world of superhero super spies, and the fans have been asking for this since the books were announced. So, give them what they want!" When coming up with ways that Black Widow, Hawkeye and Mockingbird could all interact, McCann threw out the idea of revealing the origins of Ronin and introducing a new Ronin. In the comic book, the new Ronin surrounds himself with the Dark Ocean Society, of which McCann did extensive research, stating, "I actually did a lot of research for this in Japanese spycraft and secret societies. The Dark Ocean Society in Japanese is actually called Genyōsha, but we couldn't call it that in Marvel because we have something called Genosha and it might confuse everybody". McCann also researched Japan–Russia relations for the comic book's setting on the disputed Kuril Islands revealing that the week that Widowmaker #1 came out, talks broke down between Russia and Japan over the real-life Kuril Islands.

In November 2010 it was reported that Widowmaker will instead be solicited as a stand-alone miniseries starting in December 2010, following the cancellation of Hawkeye & Mockingbird in issue number six. The report also came with an announcement that Widowmaker will be followed up by another four-issue miniseries, Hawkeye: Blindspot.

== Characters ==
- Black Widow / Natasha Romanov: Ex-Soviet super spy, former lover of Hawkeye and current member of the Secret Avengers.
- Hawkeye / Clint Barton: Master archer and Avenger; briefly used the identity of the ninja "Ronin", former lover of both Black Widow and Mockingbird.
- Mockingbird / Bobbi Morse: Former S.H.I.E.L.D. agent and ex-lover of Hawkeye, current New Avenger and head of the World Counter-terrorism Agency (W.C.A.).
- Dominic Fortune / Duvid Fortunov: Soldier of fortune currently employed by the W.C.A.

== Plot ==
The death of a Japanese S.H.I.E.L.D. agent at the United Nations Headquarters in New York City leads Hawkeye, Mockingbird and Dominic Fortune to Sakha, Russia where they meet up with the Black Widow who is investigating the mass murder of K.G.B. recruits inside the Red Room. Surveillance video reveals the killings are carried out by the Dark Ocean Society led by a new Ronin, the guise once used by Hawkeye. However, before their investigation is completed, the group is attacked by the Supreme Soviets and is forced to split up. Hawkeye and Black Widow travel to Sapporo, Japan, the base of operations of the Dark Ocean Society and Mockingbird and Dominic Fortune head to the tip of the Kamchatka Peninsula following mass Russian troop movements. The group reunites on the disputed Kuril Islands and discovers that the identity of the new Ronin is Alexei Shostakov, the original Red Guardian and Black Widow's ex-husband. Shostakov reveals he intends to force a war between Russia and Japan that will restore Russia's former glory. A battle ensues as Hawkeye, Mockingbird, Black Widow and Dominic Fortune take on a combination of the Dark Ocean Society and the Supreme Soviets. During the battle Hawkeye receives a critical blow to the head; Black Widow, however, manages to take down Shostakov with the help of the Supreme Soviet member, Fantasma.

== Reception ==
The first issue of Widowmaker was received with mostly positive reviews. Doug Zawisza of Comic Book Resources gave it 4.5 stars (out of 5) stating, "McCann assembles this story as though it were a big budget, high-stakes adventure film frozen onto the printed page" and "Such a fabulous, high-strung adventure tale deserves equally fabulous art, and David López, Alvaro López, and Nathan Fairbairn certainly deliver". Jesse Schedeen of IGN gave it an 8.0 (out of 10) remarking, "All in all, Widowmaker has all the makings of a fun and frantic adventure that won't be bogged down by pointless tie-ins. It's a breath of fresh air in that regard". Jennifer Smith of Newsarama stated, "McCann's writing sparkles with wit, pathos, and the weight of Marvel history" and "David Lopez' gorgeous art is only getting better and better, making action scenes compelling even when their motivations were unclear".

== Collected editions ==
Title	Material collected	Year	ISBN
Hawkeye & Mockingbird/Black Widow: Widowmaker	Widowmaker #1–4 and Solo Avengers #14–16.	March 2011	978-0-78515-205-7
