= Hawkeye & Mockingbird =

Comic book series

- Cover to Hawkeye & Mockingbird #1 (June 2010). Art by Paul Renaud.

Publication information
- Publisher: Marvel Comics
- Schedule: Monthly
- Format: Ongoing series
- Genre: Superhero
- Publication date: June – November 2010
- No. of issues: 6
- Main character(s): Hawkeye; Mockingbird

Creative team
- Created by: Jim McCann; David Lopez
- Written by: Jim McCann
- Penciller: David Lopez
- Inker: Alvaro Lopez
- Letterer: Cory Petit
- Colorist: Nathan Fairbairn
- Editor: Bill Rosemann

Hawkeye & Mockingbird was a 2010 comic book ongoing series published by Marvel Comics that starred superheroes Hawkeye and Mockingbird.

== Publication history ==
The series launched in June 2010 as part of Marvel Comic's Heroic Age by writer Jim McCann and artist David López. Hawkeye & Mockingbird was the creative team's first ongoing series for Marvel, but they had previously collaborated on the 2009 miniseries New Avengers: The Reunion. In an interview with Comic Book Resources, McCann stated that the themes of the book are "responsibility, trust, and overcoming devastating blows". López describes the artistic style as "an evolution", stating "I've been sketching for months and I've got a clearer feel of the mood we want for the book. Jim is giving me plenty of cool things to draw. We've got so much gasoline, powder, trick arrows, staff action and destruction of property that we're going to need new insurance – and at the same time, it's emotionally intense. It's a very solid book, balanced".

In October 2010 it was reported that the series would be put on hold after issue #6 for the duration of a special crossover called Widowmaker, which sees the comic's two main characters teaming up with the Black Widow. It was previously expected that the series would resume regular publication following the conclusion of the crossover. However, Marvel's Executive Editor Tom Brevoort explained, "After Widowmaker, Hawkeye & Mockingbird won't be coming back in its current form. However, there will be a project following up on the events of Widowmaker that will hopefully scratch your Hawkeye & Mockingbird itch". Issue #6 set the stage for the four issue miniseries Widowmaker by Hawkeye & Mockingbird creators Jim McCann and David López and the Black Widow creative team of writer Duane Swierczynski and artist Manuel Garcia, which begins in December 2010. Widowmaker comes to a conclusion in January with the book's aftermath setting up a new status quo for both Hawkeye and Mockingbird. About the future of the comic book McCann stated, "I can tell you that David Lopez and I are not done working together, and the story that I've plotted, planned out and wanted to tell after 'Widowmaker' is still going to be told. I just can't say how, why or where".

== Characters ==
- Hawkeye (Clint Barton) - An orphan trained to be one of the greatest archers in the world while employed in the circus and member of the Avengers. Ex-husband and current boyfriend of Mockingbird.
- Mockingbird (Barbara "Bobbi" Morse) - Former agent of S.H.I.E.L.D. turned superhero, founder and field operations commander of the World Counter-terrorism Agency (W.C.A.) and member of the New Avengers. Ex-wife and current girlfriend of Hawkeye.
- Twitchy - Senior intelligence analyst of the W.C.A.
- Bangs - Weapons and explosives specialist for the W.C.A.
- London - Research developer for the W.C.A.
- Dominic Fortune (Duvid Jerome Fortunov) - Soldier of fortune with ties to the criminal underground, currently employed by the W.C.A.

== Plot ==
=== Ghosts ===
Hawkeye and Mockingbird, agents of World Counter-terrorism Agency chase down thieves stealing artifacts belonging to Jaimie Slade, the daughter of Hamilton Slade. That night Jaimie Slade is possessed by the spirit of Lincoln Slade, whom Mockingbird had previously killed, and then recruits Crossfire, Hawkeye's nemesis, to help exact his revenge. After discovering the secret identities of Hawkeye and Mockingbird, Crossfire tracks down and critically wounds Mockingbird's mother. Enraged by the assault, Hawkeye and Mockingbird storm Crossfire's base but soon discover that they have been lured into a trap where Slade sets off a bomb that seemingly kills the duo. Surviving the blast, Hawkeye and Mocking use their apparent deaths to lure Slade and Crossfire into a trap of their own. Hawkeye and Mockingbird transport Jaimie Slade and Crossfire to the Nevada desert where Hamilton Slade is waiting for them. A battle ensues as Hamilton Slade exorcises the Phantom Rider spirit from his daughter Jaimie but is killed before the ritual is complete. However, Mockingbird still manages to defeat the Phantom Rider while Hawkeye takes down Crossfire, nearly killing him in process. Following the battle Hawkeye expresses remorse for nearly killing Crossfire, quits the W.C.A. and breaks up with Mockingbird. Plagued by guilt, Hawkeye visits Crossfire now in custody at the Raft, where Steve Rogers convinces him to rejoin the W.C.A. in order to protect them as they have all been placed on a hit list.

== Reception ==
Reception for the first issue was mostly positive. Comic Book Resources gave it 4.5 out of 5 stars. IGN gave it 7.7 out of 10. David Pepose of Newsarama stated, "With bows and arrows, spies and guns, heroes and villains and the World Counterterrorism Agency, there is a lot for Jim McCann and David Lopez to work with for Hawkeye and Mockingbird -- and after reading this first issue, I am definitely excited to see where it goes next. It's lighthearted swashbuckling with romance and intrigue, and ultimately it's got the same infectious fun factor as a book like The Incredible Hercules. Just like the skills of its titular heroes, this is a book you can't miss".

== Collected editions ==
Hawkeye & Mockingbird has been collected in the following trade paperbacks:

| Title | Material Collected | ISBN | Publication Date |
|---|---|---|---|
| Hawkeye & Mockingbird: Ghosts | Hawkeye & Mockingbird #1-6, Enter the Heroic Age | 0785144188 | January 26, 2011 |
