= Dark Avengers =

Group of fictional characters

- Cover of Dark Avengers #1 (January 2009); Art by Mike Deodato Jr.

Series publication information
- Publisher: Marvel Comics
- Schedule: Monthly
- Format: Ongoing series
- Genre: Superhero
- Publication date: (Volume 1); March 2009 – June 2010 (Volume 1 continued); August 2012 – July 2013
- Number of issues: (vol. 1) 16 (vol. 1 cont.) 16

Creative team
- Writer(s): Brian Michael Bendis
- Artist(s): Mike Deodato
- Colorist(s): Rain Beredo
- Creator(s): Brian Michael Bendis

Collected editions
- Dark Avengers Assemble: ISBN 0-7851-3851-X
- Molecule Man: ISBN 0-7851-3853-6
- Siege: ISBN 0-7851-4811-6

Dark Avengers

Group publication information
- Publisher: Marvel Comics
- First appearance: Dark Avengers #1 (January 2009)
- Created by: Brian Michael Bendis

In-story information
- Base(s): NYC
- Leader(s): U.S. Agent; Formerly: Norman Osborn; Victoria Hand; Luke Cage
- Member(s): Former Members: Ares (John Aaron); Captain Marvel (Noh-Varr); Hawkeye (Bullseye); Hawkeye (Trickshot); Hulk (Skaar); Ms. Marvel (Superia); Sentry (The Void); Spider-Man (Ai Apaec); Spider-Man (Venom); Wolverine (Daken); Wolverine (Tomi Shishido); Ms. Marvel (Moonstone); Scarlet Witch (Toxie Doxie); Ragnarok

Dark Avengers is a 2009–2013 American comic book series published by Marvel Comics. It is part of a series of titles that features various iterations of the superhero team the Avengers, with this version of the team – unbeknownst to the public in its stories – having several members who are actually supervillains and anti-heroes disguised as the established superheroes.

== Publication history ==
The series debuted with issue #1, dated January 2009, as part of a multi-series story arc entitled "Dark Reign." In the premiere, writer Brian Michael Bendis and artist Mike Deodato (working from a continuity begun in a previous, company-wide story arc, "Secret Invasion," involving an infiltration of Earth by the shape-shifting alien Skrulls and that race's eventual defeat) chronicled the aftermath of the U.S. government's disbanding of the federally sanctioned superhero team, the Avengers. Bendis described the thinking behind the team: "These are bad-ass, hardcore get-it-done types. They'll close the door and take care of business and he's dressing them up to make them something that the people want." This is in contrast to the changes Norman Osborn is shown making to the Thunderbolts, where, according to writer Andy Diggle, he turns that team into "something much more covert and much more lethal: his own personal hit squad".

The series ended with Dark Avengers #16, at the culmination of the Siege storyline.

The Thunderbolts comic book was renamed Dark Avengers beginning with issue #175, but the creative team remained unchanged. Dark Avengers ended with issue #190.

== Fictional team biography ==
=== First Dark Avengers ===
The government assigned the team's redevelopment to Norman Osborn, whom the government had previously assigned to head the superhero team the Thunderbolts and who had become a public hero for his role in repelling the Skrull threat. Osborn, also given leadership of the espionage agency S.H.I.E.L.D., reforms that agency into H.A.M.M.E.R. and creates a new Avengers team under its aegis.

The initial line-up consists of former Thunderbolts members and new recruits, including the Sentry, Ares, Noh-Varr (now Captain Marvel) as well as disguised super-villains Moonstone (portraying Ms. Marvel), Venom (Mac Gargan portraying Spider-Man), Bullseye (portraying Hawkeye) and Wolverine's disgruntled son Daken taking on the Wolverine mantle. Osborn also takes on the identity of Iron Patriot, wearing a red, white, and blue-themed Iron Man armor.

The Dark Avengers arrive in San Francisco to set up martial law and to quell anti-mutant riots. In doing so, Osborn sets up his own team of X-Men consisting of Cloak and Dagger, Mimic, Emma Frost, Namor, Daken, Weapon Omega and Mystique (posing as Professor X). After Frost, Namor, Cloak, and Dagger betray the team, Osborn swears vengeance on the X-Men.

A series of disappearances throughout Colorado causes the Dark Avengers (except for Venom) to visit the small town of Dinosaur, Colorado. Everyone except Osborn is teleported away, while Osborn encounters Molecule Man, who tortures him physically and mentally. Osborn's assistant Victoria Hand successfully stalls Molecule Man with a false surrender until the Void is able to reform and kill Molecule Man. It is revealed that the Sentry and the Void have the same powers as Molecule Man. Sentry regains control of himself and agrees to begin therapy with Moonstone, while Hand demands Osborn to undergo therapy as well after being tortured.

In flashback, it is told how Robert Reynolds received his vast powers from experimental drugs, using his might as the Sentry to live the life of a superhero, while his darker emotions manifested as the Void. Osborn has manipulated Reynolds into allowing the Void to take over, to do Osborn's bidding. Osborn has somehow recreated the serum that gave Reynolds his powers, making him dependent on Osborn and his approval. Meanwhile, Reynolds's wife Lindy has been a virtual prisoner in the Sentry's Watchtower, has even attempted to kill him, and begs Reynolds to either kill her or let her go. Reynolds's warring personalities, however, have stalemated. The Sentry even attempts suicide, flying into the heart of the sun, but fails due to his invulnerability. Osborn orders Bullseye to kill Lindy, blaming her for Sentry's uncertainty and weakness.

=== New Dark Avengers ===
A new Dark Avengers team is formed by Norman Osborn and H.A.M.M.E.R. The roster includes Skaar, Gorgon, Ai Apaec, June Covington, Superia, and Trickshot. Osborn also has A.I.M. rebuild Ragnarok so that he can join the Dark Avengers. Although Osborn claims to be certain that his new team is superior to their "templates," he appears unaware that Madame Hydra and Gorgon are already planning to kill him once he proves himself to be too dangerous as leader, intending to use his team to sow discord by serving as a voice of the "disenfranchised" unsatisfied with the status quo. The subsequent fight against the New Avengers proves to be relatively evenly matched. Although Osborn demonstrates a surprising new level of strength, the others are able to hold their own far more easily. When they attempt to teleport away, the New Avengers end up facing Ragnarok. Spider-Man and Iron Fist are able to defeat Ragnarok, but the Dark Avengers' actions have still damaged the New Avengers' reputations.

The Dark Avengers capture Captain America during their successful attack on both Avengers teams with the intention of executing him for his 'crimes'. Gorgon and Superia are already planning to betray the team, while Victoria Hand, apparently Osborn's double agent inside the team, reveals to the New Avengers her real allegiance to Captain America and Skaar turns on his teammates after they confirm their intentions to assault Captain America. Skaar reveals that he is a double agent for Captain America, allowing the New Avengers to defeat the rest of the team. Osborn is shown to have developed the abilities of the Super-Adaptoid, enabling him to copy the abilities of the other Avengers. The Avengers find a way to overload this power, which puts Osborn into a coma. After Osborn is defeated, the rest of the Dark Avengers are detained.

As of #175, Thunderbolts is renamed Dark Avengers with writer Jeff Parker and the art team of Kev Walker and Declan Shalvey remaining on the title. When the Thunderbolts are missing in the time stream, the Dark Avengers are recruited as a replacement team. In order to keep the Dark Avengers in line, they were implanted with nanites and placed under the leadership of Luke Cage.

The Dark Avengers team are thrown into the alternate world of Earth-13584 with John Walker (U.S. Agent), where they are captured by that reality's version of Iron Man. It turns out that A.I.M. is behind the reality manipulation. Due to the Dark Avengers' arrival, the Solar System is starting to disappear. The Dark Avengers enter the A.I.M. base and arrive back in their world. Skaar hops away, but the rest of the team ponders what to do as most of them are still criminals. June Covington bewitches U.S. Agent into believing they could still work as a team and steps on a still miniaturized Ai Apaec.

== Roster ==
=== Founders ===
Character	Real Name	Joined in	Notes
Iron Patriot	Norman Osborn	Dark Avengers #1 (March 2009)	AKA the Green Goblin. Former leader, captured in Dark Avengers #16. Redesigned Stark armor to represent both Iron Man and Captain America. Rejoined in New Avengers #18. Acquired the power of the Super-Adaptoid after reassembling the team.
"Spider-Man"	Mac Gargan	Dark Avengers #1 (March 2009)	AKA Scorpion. Captured in Dark Avengers #16. Became Scorpion again after Venom suit was taken by government.
"Ms. Marvel" a.k.a. Captain Marvel	Karla Sofen	Dark Avengers #1 (March 2009)	AKA Moonstone. Captured in Dark Avengers #16 and joined Luke Cage's Thunderbolts in Thunderbolts #144. Rejoins the team in Dark Avengers #184.
"Hawkeye"	Lester	Dark Avengers #1 (March 2009)	AKA Bullseye. Captured in Dark Avengers #16. Killed by Daredevil in Shadowland #1.
"Wolverine"	Akihiro	Dark Avengers #1 (March 2009)	Wolverine's psychopathic son, Daken. He avoided capture in Dark Avengers #16 and remains at large.
Captain Marvel	Noh-Varr	Dark Avengers #1 (March 2009)	Left the team in Dark Avengers #6 and joined the Avengers.
Ares		Dark Avengers #1 (March 2009)	Killed in Siege #2 by the Sentry.
Sentry	Robert Reynolds	Dark Avengers #1 (March 2009)	AKA Void. Went rogue in Siege #3 before being killed by Thor in Siege #4.

=== Post-Fear Itself recruits ===
Character	Real Name	Joined in	Notes
"Wolverine"	Tomi Shishido	New Avengers #18 (November 2011)	Fought and killed by Wolverine in Wolverine #31. Revived by the Hand in Secret Warriors #2. Leaves the team in New Avengers vol. 2, #23.
"Hulk"	Skaar/Hiro-Kala	New Avengers #18 (November 2011)	Recruited by Osborn in the Savage Land, Skaar was actually double agent working for Captain America in secret, along with his twin brother Hiro-Kala. Both rejoined the team in Dark Avengers #175 and left again in Dark Avengers #190.
"Ms. Marvel"	Deidre Wentworth	New Avengers #18 (November 2011)	Led a H.A.M.M.E.R. team after Norman Osborn's incarceration. Leaves the team in New Avengers vol. 2, #23.
"Hawkeye"	Barney Barton	New Avengers #18 (November 2011)	Joined after having his death in a hospital bed faked by Osborn.
"Spider-Man"	Ai Apaec	New Avengers #18 (November 2011)	South American spider god. First encountered by Osborn in Osborn #1. Changed into a six-armed humanoid form resembling the black suit version of Spider-Man by an unknown substance.
"Scarlet Witch"	Dr. June Covington	New Avengers #18 (November 2011)	Biologist and geneticist. First encountered by Osborn in Osborn #1 following the Siege of Asgard.
"Thor"	Ragnarok	New Avengers #18 (November 2011)	Currently held and being repaired by A.I.M. on Norman Osborn's behalf. He was repaired in time to help the Dark Avengers fight the New Avengers.

=== Marvel ReEvolution recruits ===
Character	Real Name	Joined in	Notes
U.S. Agent	John Walker	Dark Avengers #185 (2013)	John Walker was swept along with the Dark Avengers to an alternate reality. He resumes his role as U.S. Agent after receiving a lobotomized alternate reality version of the Venom symbiote that recreates his missing limbs.

== Reception ==
=== Accolades ===
- In 2018, CBR.com ranked the Dark Avengers 13th in their "25 Most Powerful Avengers Teams" list.
- In 2020, CBR.com ranked the Dark Avengers 6th in their "Marvel: 10 Most Powerful Teams" list.
- In 2022, CBR.com ranked the Dark Avengers 3rd in their "10 Marvel Teams That Exceeded Expectations" list and 10th in their "13 Strongest Avengers Rosters" list.

== Other versions ==
=== Ultimate Marvel ===
An alternate universe iteration of the Dark Avengers, known as the Dark Ultimates, appears in the Ultimate Marvel imprint, consisting of Kang the Conqueror, Reed Richards, Hulk, and Quicksilver.

== In other media ==
=== Television ===
The Dark Avengers appear in a self-titled episode of Avengers Assemble. This version of the group are reality-flipped versions of the original Avengers who operate as supervillains while the Squadron Supreme work to stop them. However, the Dark Avengers eventually discover that the Squadron used the Reality Gem to change the world in their image and use it to undo the Squadron's changes.

=== Video games ===
- The Dark Avengers appear in Marvel: Avengers Alliance. This version of the group is formed by Dell Rusk and consists of Bullseye operating as Hawkeye, Daken operating as Wolverine, Ragnarok, Yelena Belova / Black Widow, and Mac Gargan / Venom.
- The Dark Avengers appear in Marvel Puzzle Quest, consisting of Ares, Bullseye, Daken, Moonstone, Ragnarok, Sentry, Mac Gargan / Venom, and Yelena Belova.

== Collected editions ==
The series is being collected into individual volumes:

- Volume 1: Dark Avengers Assemble (collects Dark Avengers #1–6, 160 pages, premiere hardcover, September 2009, ISBN 0-7851-3851-X, softcover, December 2009, ISBN 0-7851-3852-8)
- Dark Avengers/Uncanny X-Men - Utopia (collects Dark Avengers #7-8, "Dark Avengers/Uncanny X-Men: Utopia" "Utopia Finale" and Uncanny X-Men #513-514, 352 pages, hardcover, December 2009, ISBN 0-7851-4233-9, softcover, April 2010, ISBN 0-7851-4234-7)
- Volume 2: Molecule Man (collects Dark Avengers #9-12, 112 pages, premiere hardcover, February 2010, ISBN 0-7851-3853-6)
- Dark Avengers: Siege (collects Dark Avengers #13-16, and Dark Avengers Annual #1, 144 pages, Marvel Comics, premiere hardcover, July 2010, ISBN 0-7851-4811-6)
- Dark Avengers: The End is the Beginning (collects Dark Avengers #175-183, softcover, February 2013, ISBN 0785161724)
- Dark Avengers: Masters of Evil (collects Dark Avengers #184-190, softcover, July 2013, ISBN 0785168478)

All the issues (except the Utopia crossover) were collected into one hardback book:

- Dark Avengers Marvel (collects Dark Avengers #1-6, #9-16 and Annual #1, hardcover, 400 pages, July 2011, ISBN 0-7851-5650-X)

As were the spin-offs:

- Ms. Marvel:
  - Volume 7: Dark Reign (collects Ms. Marvel #35-40, 176 pages, Marvel Comics, premiere hardcover, September 2009, ISBN 0-7851-3838-2, softcover, December 2009, ISBN 0-7851-3839-0)
  - Volume 8: War of The Marvels (collects Ms. Marvel #41-46, 120 pages, Marvel Comics, premiere hardcover, January 2010, ISBN 0-7851-3840-4, softcover, May 2010, ISBN 0-7851-3841-2)
- Dark Wolverine:
  - Volume 1: The Prince (collects Wolverine #73-74 and Dark Wolverine #75-77, 112 pages, Marvel Comics, premiere hardcover, October 2009, ISBN 0-7851-3900-1, softcover, March 2010, ISBN 0-7851-3866-8)
  - Volume 2: My Hero (collects Dark Wolverine #78-81, 112 pages, Marvel Comics, premiere hardcover, April 2010, ISBN 0-7851-3977-X)
  - Siege: X-Men - Dark Wolverine & New Mutants (includes Dark Wolverine #82-84, 128 pages, Marvel Comics, premiere hardcover, June 2010, ISBN 0-7851-4815-9)
- Dark Reign: Sinister Spider-Man (collects Dark Reign: The Sinister Spider-Man #1-4, 112 pages, Marvel Comics, softcover, January 2010, ISBN 0-7851-4239-8)
- Dark Avengers: Ares (collects Ares #1-5 and Dark Avengers: Ares #1-3, 192 pages, Marvel Comics, softcover, April 2010, ISBN 0-7851-4406-4)
- Dark Reign: Hawkeye (collects Dark Reign: Hawkeye #1-5, 120 pages, Marvel Comics, softcover, May 2010, ISBN 0-7851-3850-1)
