= Expiration Date (Swierczynski novel) =

2010 novel by Duane Swierczynski

- First edition
- Author: Duane Swierczynski
- Genre: Science fiction, Crime
- Published: 2010
- Publisher: Minotaur Books
- Pages: 245
- Awards: Anthony Award for Best Paperback Original (2011)
- ISBN: 978-0-312-36340-6

Expiration Date is a time travel crime novel by Duane Swierczynski published in 2010. It was published by Minotaur Books, an imprint of St. Martin's Press owned by Macmillan Publishers. The novel received the Anthony Award for Best Paperback Original in 2011.

== Plot summary ==
When Mickey Wade loses his newspaper job he returns to his old slum neighborhood in Philadelphia to stay in his grandfather's flat. He takes some "headache" pills only to find that they send him into the past – to 1972, the year he was born. There he meets the 12-year-old who will grow up to murder Mickey's father.
