= David López (artist) =

Spanish comic book artist (born 1975)

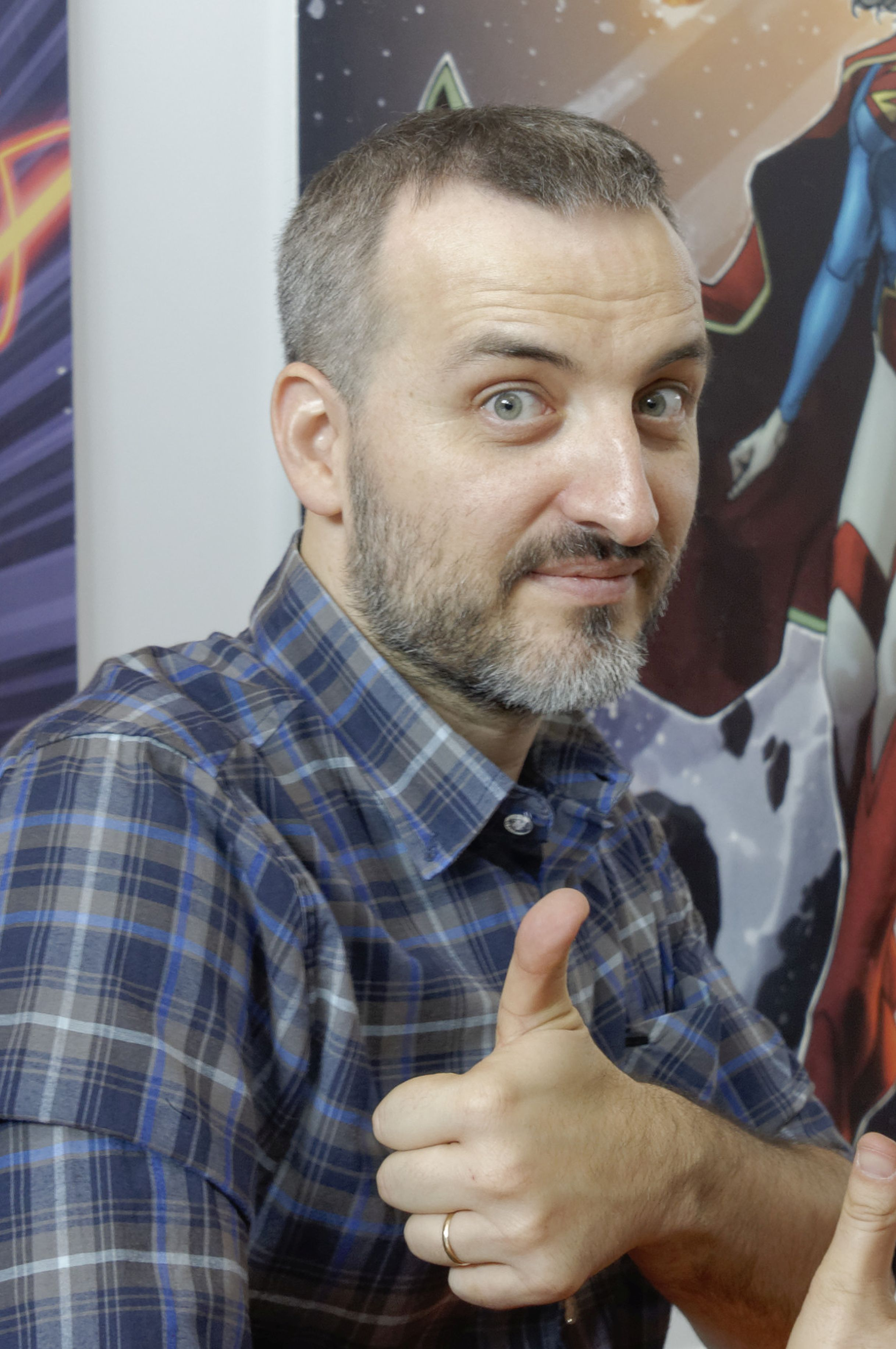
- Comic Con Germany Stuttgart 2017
- Born: 1975 (age 50–51) Las Palmas, Gran Canaria, Canary Islands
- Area: Comic book artist

David López (born 1975 in Las Palmas de Gran Canaria) is a Spanish comic book artist.

== Biography ==
López started his comics career in the Spanish fanzine before moving on to work on Espiral. In 2002 he moved to the American comic book market.

He is best known for co-creating and illustrating the first volume of the monthly series Fallen Angel, which was co-created by writer Peter David, and published by DC Comics. After the series was canceled in May 2005 following its twentieth issue, it was picked up by IDW Publishing in December of that year, but Lopez did not continue on it as artist, although he did provide the covers. López is also known for his lengthy run on DC's Catwoman and his work on All-New Wolverine.

== Bibliography ==
Creator-owned, writer and artist:

- Blackhand Ironhead #1-5 (Panel Syndicate, 2017–2018)

Interior comic work includes:

- Espiral (script and art):
  - "Espiral" (strip in 451º, 1996–1998)
  - Espiral #1-4 (La Cúpula, 1998–2000)
  - "Lamur" (in Extra Dude #1, Dude Comics, 2001)
  - Polaroids (graphic novel, Planeta DeAgostini, 2002)
- Espúnik (script and art, Camaleón Ediciones, 1998)
- Amarillo Enamorado (script and art, Dude Comics, 2000)
- Batman: Legends of the Dark Knight (DC Comics):
  - "Loyalties" (with John Ostrander, in #159-161, 2002–2003)
  - "Cold Snap" (with J. Torres, in #190-191, 2005)
- Justice League Adventures #9: "Stepping Out" (with Matt Howarth, DC Comics, 2002)
- Fallen Angel v1 #1-20 (with Peter David, DC Comics, 2003–2005)
- Wonder Woman (with Greg Rucka, DC Comics):
  - "Sacrifice, Part Four" (among other artists, in #219, 2005)
  - "Affirmative Defense" (in #220, 2005)
- JSA #76: "In Search of..." (with Geoff Johns, DC Comics, 2005)
- Birds of Prey #86: "A Wakeful Time, Chapter Three" (with Gail Simone, DC Comics, 2005)
- What If...? Submariner: "What If Prince Namor of Atlantis Grew Up on Land?" (with Greg Pak, one-shot, Marvel, 2006)
- Catwoman #53-82 (with Will Pfeifer, DC Comics, 2006–2008)
- Countdown to Final Crisis (DC Comics):
  - "Death from Above" (with Adam Beechen, in #48, 2007)
  - "The Funeral" (with Justin Gray and Jimmy Palmiotti, in #43, 2007)
  - "Forbidden Fruit" (with Adam Beechen, in #37, 2007)
- Batman Annual #26: "Resurrection Shuffle" (with Peter Milligan, DC Comics, 2007)
- Hawkeye & Mockingbird (with Jim McCann, Marvel):
  - "Suspicion" (in Dark Reign: New Nation, one-shot, 2009)
  - New Avengers: The Reunion #1-4 (2009)
  - "Big Trouble in Little Chinatown" (in Enter the Heroic Age, one-shot, 2010)
  - "Ghosts" (in Hawkeye & Mockingbird #1-6, 2010–2011)
  - Widowmaker #1, 3 (2011)
- New Avengers #50 (with Brian Michael Bendis, among other artists, Marvel, 2009)
- Gotham City Sirens #7: "Holiday Story" (with Paul Dini, DC Comics, 2010)
- Nation X (Marvel):
  - "Testament" (with Scott Snyder, in #1, 2010)
  - "7 1/2" (with John Barber, in #2, 2010)
- New Mutants (Marvel):
  - "International Incident" (with Zeb Wells and Paul Davidson, in #10, 2010)
  - "A Date with the Devil" (with Dan Abnett and Andy Lanning, in #33-37, 2012)
  - "Night on the Town" (with Dan Abnett and Andy Lanning, in #41, 2012)
- Marvel Heartbreakers: "Beauty & The Beast: An Epilogue" (with Jim McCann, one-shot, Marvel, 2010)
- Prince of Persia: Before the Sandstorm #2 (with Jordan Mechner, Tom Fowler and Niko Henrichon, Dynamite, 2010)
- I am an Avenger #2: "The Journal of Edwin Jarvis" (with Paul Tobin, Marvel, 2010)
- X-23 #5-6: "Songs of the Orphan Child" (with Marjorie Liu and Will Conrad, Marvel, 2011)
- Mystic #1-4 (with G. Willow Wilson, Marvel, 2011)
- X-Men (with Brian Wood, Marvel):
  - "Blank Generation" (in v3 #30-33, 2012)
  - "Human Being" (in v3 #36-37, 2012–2013)
  - "Reunion" (in v4 #4, 2013)
  - "Battle of the Atom" (in v4 #5-6, 2013)
- A+X #4: "Captain America + Quentin Quire: The New Deal?" (with Jason Latour, Marvel, 2013)
- Wolverine and the X-Men #24: "Ain't No Sin to Be Glad You're Alive" (with Jason Aaron, Marvel, 2013)
- X-Termination #1-2 (with Marjorie Liu, Greg Pak and David Lapham, Marvel, 2013)
- Spider-Man (with Christopher Yost, Marvel):
  - "Pro-Death" (in Avenging #22, 2013)
  - "A Day in Someone Else's Life" (in Superior Team-Up #1, 2013)
- Nova v3 #10: "Land and Launch" (with Zeb Wells and Carlo Barberi, Marvel, 2014)
- Guardians of the Galaxy v3 #22 (with Brian Michael Bendis and Valerio Schiti, Marvel, 2014)
- Captain Marvel v8 #1-6, 9-15 (with Kelly Sue DeConnick, Marvel, 2014–2015)
- Captain Marvel and the Carol Corps #1-3 (with Kelly Sue DeConnick and Kelly Thompson, Marvel, 2015)
- All-New Wolverine #1-6 (with Tom Taylor, Marvel, 2015–2016)
- Mr. & Mrs. X #6 (with Kelly Thompson, Marvel, 2018)

=== Covers only ===
- Fallen Angel v2 #1-5 (IDW Publishing, 2005–2006)
- Manhunter #16-17 (DC Comics, 2006)
- Fallen Angel: Return of the Son #2-4 (IDW Publishing, 2011)
- X-Men v3 #38-40 (Marvel, 2013)
- Morbius: The Living Vampire #3-8 (Marvel, 2013)
- All-New X-Men #16 (Marvel, 2013)
- Quantum & Woody #5 (Valiant, 2013)
- Wolverine v5 #11 (Marvel, 2014)
- X-Men v4 #10 (Marvel, 2014)
- Guardians of the Galaxy 100th Anniversary Special #1 (Marvel, 2014)
- Captain Marvel v8 #7-8 (Marvel, 2014)
