= Jim McCann (writer) =

American comic book writer

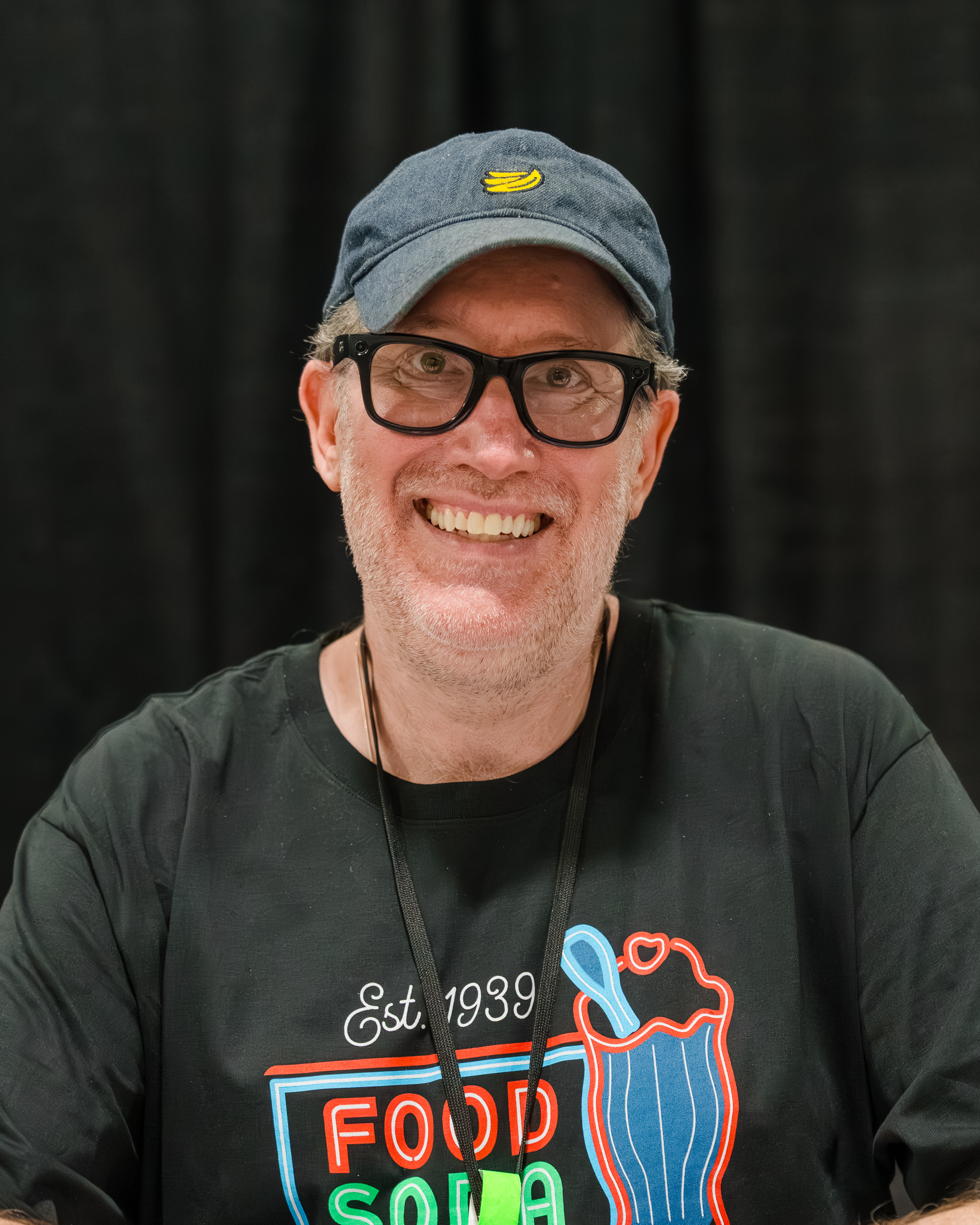
- McCann at GalaxyCon Nashville in 2026
- Born: James Andrew McCann, II; January 7, 1974 (age 52) Nashville, Tennessee
- Area: Writer
- Notable works: Return of the Dapper Men; New Avengers: The Reunion; Hawkeye & Mockingbird; Widowmaker; Hawkeye: Blindspot; Marvel Zombies Christmas Carol; One Life to Live; Maire's Question
- Awards: Eisner for Best Graphic Album: New (2011); Prism
- Partner: Jamie Atchinson

James Andrew McCann, II (born January 7, 1974) is an American writer of comic books, theatre and television programs. McCann has worked on several films and music videos before entering the ABC Daytime Writer Development Program, during which time he wrote for the ABC daytime drama One Life to Live. Upon moving to New York City in 2004 from Nashville, McCann found a position at Marvel Comics handling publicity and PR for publishing while managing press and panels at conventions. Subsequently, he returned to writing for Marvel comics, creator-owned graphic novels, and other projects.

== Early life ==
McCann was born on January 7, 1974, in Nashville, Tennessee. He graduated from Father Ryan High School in 1992. McCann graduated from Xavier University in 1996 with a Bachelor of Arts degree in Communication Arts, Electronic Media with a double minor in English and Theatre. He left his creative mark at Xavier by winning a Best Writer award in 1994 for his play Maire’s Question.

== Career ==
McCann worked on several films and music videos before he was presented with an opportunity to enter the ABC Daytime Writer Development Program, during which time he wrote for the popular ABC daytime drama One Life to Live. During this time, he also co-founded the Nashville Theatre Company, for which he directed many plays and served as Artistic Director from 2000-2004.

McCann decided to move to New York City in 2004 to explore further opportunities. He found a position at Marvel Comics that same year dealing with publicity and public relations for publishing while handling press and panels at conventions.

McCann returned to his writing roots, writing creator-owned graphic novels and other projects for Marvel Comics including: What If? House of M, X-Men: Blue Christmas, Dark Reign: New Nation and New Avengers: The Reunion. He built on this work, in particular bringing back Mockingbird, in the ongoing series Hawkeye & Mockingbird, Widowmaker, and Hawkeye: Blindspot.

He co-created with acclaimed artist Janet Lee an original graphic novel, Return of the Dapper Men, published by Archaia Studios Press. Return of the Dapper Men garnered 5 Eisner nominations and won an Eisner for Best Graphic Album: New. Jim recently finished Marvel Zombies Christmas Carol, an adaptation of Charles Dickens seminal holiday classic A Christmas Carol.

For TV, theater and film work, McCann is represented by Creative Artists Agency (CAA).

== Awards ==
- 2010 Prism Award (for New Avengers: The Reunion)
- 2011 Eisner Award for Best Graphic Album: New (for Return of the Dapper Men with Janet Lee)

== Bibliography ==
=== Creator-owned works ===
- Return of the Dapper Men (with Janet K. Lee, 144 page original graphic novel, Archaia Studios Press, October 2010, ISBN 1-932386-90-4, forthcoming)

=== Comics ===
- "Guiding Light" (back-up feature, Marvel Comics)
- "X-Men: Blue Christmas" (in Marvel Digital Holiday Special, Marvel Digital Comics Unlimited, December 2008)
- "New Avengers: The Reunion: Suspicion" (with David Lopez, in Dark Reign: New Nation, one-shot, Marvel Comics, February 2009)
- What If? House of M (with co-author Brian Reed and art by Paolo Pantalena, one-shot, February 2009)
- New Avengers: The Reunion (with David Lopez, 4-issue limited series, Marvel Comics, May–August 2009)
- Dazzler (with Kalman Andrasofszky/Ramon Perez, one-shot, Marvel Comics, July 2010)
- Hawkeye and Mockingbird (with David Lopez, ongoing series, Marvel Comics, August 2010–December 2010)
- Widowmaker (with Duane Swierczynski and art by David Lopez, 4-issue limited series, Marvel Comics, December 2010-January 2011)
- Hawkeye: Blindspot (with Paco Diaz, 4-issue limited series, Marvel Comics, February–May 2011)
- Marvel Zombies Christmas Carol (with David Baldeon, 5-issue adapted series, Marvel Comics, forthcoming)
