= Hawkeye (Clint Barton) =

Marvel Comics fictional character

- Variant cover art of Thunderbolts (Vol. 5) #1 (August 2022); Art by Stefano Caselli and Federico Blee

Publication information
- Publisher: Marvel Comics
- First appearance: As Hawkeye: Tales of Suspense #57 (September 1964); As Goliath: Avengers #63 (April 1969); As Golden Archer: Captain America #179 (November 1974); As Ronin: New Avengers #27 (April 2007)
- Created by: Stan Lee (writer); Don Heck (artist)

In-story information
- Full name: Clinton Francis "Clint" Barton
- Species: Human
- Place of origin: Waverly, Iowa
- Team affiliations: Avengers; Avengers Academy; Defenders; Great Lakes Avengers; Secret Avengers; S.H.I.E.L.D.; West Coast Avengers; Wild Pack; World Counter-terrorism Agency
- Partnerships: Mockingbird (ex-wife); Kate Bishop; Black Widow
- Notable aliases: Hawkeye. Golden Archer, Goliath, Ronin
- Abilities: Master archer and marksman; Expert martial artist, hand-to-hand combatant, and acrobat; Skilled strategist and tactician; Utilizes high-tech equipment, armor, compound bow, and various types of specialty arrows
Hawkeye
Publication information
- Format: Limited series
- Genre: Superhero
- Publication date: Vol. 1: September 1983 – December 1983; Vol. 2: January 1994 – April 1994; Vol. 3: December 2003–August 2004; Vol. 4: August 2012–July 2015
- No. of issues: 4 (Vol. 1); 4 (Vol. 2); 8 (Vol. 3); 22 (Vol. 4)
- Main character(s): Clint Barton/Hawkeye; Bobbi Morse/Mockingbird
Creative team
- Written by: Vol. 1: Mark Gruenwald; Vol. 2: Chuck Dixon; Vol. 3: Fabian Nicieza; Vol. 4: Matt Fraction; Vol. 5; Jeff Lemire
- Artists: Vol. 1: Mark Gruenwald; Vol. 2: Scott Kolins; Vol. 3: Stefano Raffaele; Joe Bennett; Vol. 4: David Aja; Vol. 5; Ramon Perez

Hawkeye (Clinton Francis "Clint" Barton) is a superhero appearing in American comic books published by Marvel Comics. Created by writer Stan Lee and artist Don Heck, the character debuted as an antagonist of Iron Man in Tales of Suspense #57 (September 1964) before joining the Avengers in The Avengers #16 (May 1965). Hawkeye has appeared as a regular member of multiple Avengers titles since 1965 and received his first solo miniseries in 1983. A fourth volume of his self-titled series, launched in 2012 by writer Matt Fraction and artist David Aja, brought significant critical reappraisal of the character.

Barton is introduced as an orphan who trains as an archer with a traveling carnival before being inspired by Iron Man to pursue costumed heroism. A misunderstanding leads him into a brief criminal career under the influence of the Soviet spy Black Widow, after which he reforms and joins the Avengers. He subsequently co-founds and leads the West Coast Avengers, marries fellow superhero Mockingbird, and later leads both the Thunderbolts and various other Avengers configurations. He has no superhuman powers, relying instead on world-class archery, a supply of customized trick arrows, and combat training. He has sustained partial hearing loss on two separate occasions during his publication history, which has been depicted with increasing depth since Matt Fraction and David Aja's 2012 run.

Hawkeye stories have explored the psychological tension between the extreme confidence required of a non-powered hero operating alongside superhumans and the deep insecurity that the same powerlessness produces. Early stories established his abrasive relationship with authority and his pattern of quitting and rejoining teams in response to perceived slights. His redemption arc, from inadvertent villain to trusted Avenger and eventual mentor to Kate Bishop, has been described by scholars as among the most developed examples of character rehabilitation in the Avengers franchise. The Fraction/Aja run represented a significant shift in emphasis, foregrounding his vulnerability and engaging seriously with his deafness as both a formal and thematic element. The run's treatment of disability, particularly the 2014 issue told substantially through untranslated American Sign Language, has received sustained academic attention for its shift from the medical to the social model of disability.

Hawkeye has been adapted into a variety of other media, including film, animated series, and video games. A version of the character was portrayed by Jeremy Renner in the Marvel Cinematic Universe from his first appearance in Thor (2011) to his most recent one in Hawkeye (2021).

== Publication history ==
=== Creation ===
Hawkeye was created as part of Marvel's rapid expansion of its superhero line in the mid-1960s. Kurt Busiek, who later wrote the character in Thunderbolts and Avengers, has said that Clint Barton was probably intended as a single-use Iron Man villain, but that Stan Lee, after the finished artwork came back, saw enough potential in the character to bring him back.

According to Avengers and West Coast Avengers penciler Bob Hall, the character was conceived as Marvel's take on DC Comics' archer hero Green Arrow. Hall described Hawkeye as an example of "how Marvel could take a DC character... and make him even better," characterizing him as "a blatant rip-off" that nonetheless "really worked."

Hawkeye, in his civilian identity later revealed as Clint Barton, first appeared in Tales of Suspense #57 (cover-dated September 1964) as an adversary of Iron Man. Over his next two appearances, in Tales of Suspense #60 (December 1964) and #64 (April 1965), the character was portrayed as an inexperienced archer manipulated into opposing Iron Man by the Soviet operative Black Widow, establishing him initially as a foil to Tony Stark's superhero persona rather than a hero in his own right.

=== 1960s ===
Hawkeye appeared twice more as a villain in Tales of Suspense before joining the Avengers. By early 1965, Stan Lee's insistence on maintaining continuity across all Marvel titles had created what Sean Howe describes as an unmanageable choreography problem. Thor, Iron Man, Giant-Man, and the Wasp were each starring in their own ongoing series, making their concurrent membership in The Avengers a scheduling and continuity burden Lee could no longer sustain. His solution, introduced in The Avengers #16 (May 1965), was to replace the founding members with three reformed former villains: Hawkeye, Quicksilver, and the Scarlet Witch, led by Captain America. No superhero team in American comics had previously undergone such a comprehensive roster overhaul. Writer Kurt Busiek later suggested that Hawkeye's elevation from disposable antagonist to permanent Avenger was unplanned, and that Lee "saw Hawkeye's potential was too good to waste" only after receiving Don Heck's original art boards.

The new lineup, quickly dubbed "Cap's Kooky Quartet" by readers and eventually by the characters themselves, proved durable. Hawkeye's inclusion showed his confrontational relationship with Captain America's authority and his persistent, unrequited romantic pursuit of the Scarlet Witch. Roger Stern, who wrote The Avengers in the early 1980s, later characterized this behavior not as deliberate sexism but as an expression of the character's self-centeredness. Hawkeye was, in Stern's assessment, "not so much a sexist as an all-purpose butt-head." Writer Roy Thomas, who took over The Avengers from Lee in the late 1960s, tailored his scripts to John Buscema's richly illustrative style, resulting in a succession of mythological and cosmic adventures in which Hawkeye, Quicksilver, and the Scarlet Witch functioned primarily as ensemble members rather than protagonists. Hawkeye briefly adopted of the Goliath identity in The Avengers #63 (April 1969), when, feeling inadequate alongside his powered teammates, he secretly took Hank Pym's growth formula and snapped his own bow in two to signal the abandonment of his Hawkeye persona. Philosopher Christopher Robichaud later identified this act as telling of Clint's "need to live up to the example of his peers and earn their acceptance as well as his own."

=== 1980s ===
The direct-market revolution of the early 1980s created demand for limited series as both collectible commodities and low-risk tests of characters' solo viability. Direct-market sales increased 46 percent in 1982 and a further 32 percent in 1983, and Marvel responded with a wave of four-issue miniseries for characters outside its top tier. Among those greenlit was a Hawkeye miniseries, published from September through December 1983, written and penciled by Mark Gruenwald with inks by Brett Breeding. The series introduced Mockingbird as Clint's professional partner and romantic interest, and ended with their marriage. This development Gruenwald compressed into the final issue at a pace critics noted as premature. The series also introduced Hawkeye's partial deafness as a permanent character trait. By using one of his own sonic arrows to counter the villain Crossfire's mind-control weapon, Clint was left with significant hearing loss requiring hearing aids in both ears. Wizard Magazine later cited the issue directly: "To override the sonic mind-control device of the villain Crossfire, Hawkeye put the head of one of his sonic arrows in his mouth, drowning out the machine... Unfortunately, it cost the archer part of his hearing."

The Gruenwald miniseries was commercially successful enough to prompt further solo publication. In September 1984, Hawkeye and Mockingbird were tasked with establishing a West Coast branch of the Avengers in a four-issue limited series; the series "proved so popular that it became a regular monthly book that ran for 102 issues." The ongoing West Coast Avengers (retitled Avengers West Coast from issue #46 in August 1989) ran until 1994, with Hawkeye serving throughout as founder and team leader. Writer Roy Thomas, who worked on the title during the late 1980s, noted that the West Coast location created constant motivational problems for bringing in guest characters from the broader Marvel Universe, though it also allowed him to develop characters with fewer obligations to other ongoing series.

Hawkeye's solo publication continued with Solo Avengers in December 1987, a split book that gave the character an eleven-page feature while using the second half of each issue to showcase supporting Avengers characters. The title provided Hawkeye with a regular narrative venue while functioning as an incubator for new creative talent and untested characters. The book ran for 40 issues (retitled Avengers Spotlight from issue #21 in August 1989) before concluding in January 1991.

=== 1990s ===
The 1990s saw Hawkeye's solo publication stall. A second volume of Hawkeye ran for four issues in 1994, written by Chuck Dixon and set during Clint's period of isolation in the Canadian wilderness following Mockingbird's death; it failed to generate an ongoing series. Hawkeye: Earth's Mightiest Marksman #1 appeared in 1998 as a standalone one-shot. A third volume, launched in December 2003, lasted only eight issues before cancellation.

Hawkeye's most significant 1990s development came in Thunderbolts, where writer Kurt Busiek cast him as the leader of a team of former supervillains attempting rehabilitation. Clint, himself a former criminal whose redemption had been sponsored by Iron Man, was now replicating Captain America's mentorship relationship for a new generation of reformed antagonists. Busiek's successor on the title, Fabian Nicieza, identified the creative risk of the casting openly: "Hawkeye — much as I love the character — has been too perfect. He's been batting 1,000, but he'll strike out with the bases loaded and shake the team's confidence in him as a leader." Nicieza's stated intention was to introduce moral and leadership failures that would test rather than simply affirm Clint's competence.

The character died in The Avengers #502 (2004), during the "Avengers Disassembled" event, sacrificing himself by flying into the engines of a Kree warship conjured by the mentally destabilized Scarlet Witch.

=== 2000s ===
Hawkeye was resurrected during the "House of M" storyline and returned to publication in Brian Michael Bendis's New Avengers, initially operating under the alias Ronin rather than resuming his previous name. The Ronin persona allowed Clint to participate in the team's covert operations without the associations attached to his established costumed identity. Writer Jim McCann, who later worked extensively with the character, described this period as one of genuine psychological instability for Clint: "He went through a lot during that time... He acknowledged as much in that same issue [of New Avengers]. That, and having Bobbi and Cap back, are the things that have led him back to being Hawkeye. Now he is more grounded, sure of himself, and his place in the world."

McCann's New Avengers: The Reunion (2009), a four-issue limited series co-starring Mockingbird, who had been revealed to have survived the Mephisto confrontation that apparently killed her, was the result of McCann's active editorial advocacy. McCann later described pushing aggressively for Mockingbird to be the character returned at the end of Secret Invasion, pitching the series as "the Mr. and Mrs. Smith of the Marvel Universe." Its critical and commercial success led directly to the Hawkeye & Mockingbird ongoing series in 2010, the first sustained solo publication for either character in over a decade. McCann noted that the series converted from a planned miniseries to an ongoing specifically because of fan and retailer response: "it was the fans' and retailers' support of The Reunion that made this possible." The ongoing was cancelled after six issues.

=== 2010s ===
He's the Avenger that's Just A Dude, under it all. No healing powers, no flight, no rays, no serums, not invulnerable, not magical, not gamma-irradiated or anything else. And yet he stands with Earth's Mightiest Heroes... so who is he in-between? When the mask comes off?

— Matt Fraction

The character received a creative shift with the launch of Hawkeye volume four in August 2012 by writer Matt Fraction and artist David Aja. The series was a deliberate departure from the event-driven storytelling that dominated Marvel's publishing line. Fraction's pitch, stated at the C2E2 convention in Chicago, was that the series would explore what Hawkeye does when he is not an Avenger. The creative process was collaborative: Aja described a working method in which Fraction would develop a rough plot, Aja would sketch visual ideas and produce full-issue thumbnails, and Fraction would then write dialogue responsive to those images. "I love Matt," Aja said in a 2012 interview. "We've been working very closely since the very beginning, so much so that there's been a point where I don't know where some of our ideas come from first — him or I." Fraction had initially declined the assignment before finding his conceptual entry point in the first page of a planned second issue.

== Fictional character biography ==
Clint Barton was born in Waverly, Iowa. At a young age he lost both of his parents in a car crash. After six years in an orphanage, Clint and his brother Barney Barton ran away to join the Carson Carnival of Traveling Wonders. Clint soon caught the eye of the Swordsman, who took the young boy on as his assistant. Along with the help of Trick Shot, the Swordsman trained Clint to become a master archer. Clint later found the Swordsman embezzling money from the carnival. Before he could turn his mentor over to the authorities, Clint was beaten and left for dead, allowing the Swordsman to escape town. Clint's relationship with his brother Barney and Trick Shot soon deteriorated as well.

Clint adapted his archery skills to become a star carnival attraction, a master archer called "Hawkeye", otherwise known as "The World's Greatest Marksman". He spent some time as a member of Tiboldt's Circus, before joining the Coney Island Circus. He witnessed Iron Man in action and was inspired to become a costumed hero. However, after a misunderstanding on his first outing, Hawkeye was accused of theft and believed to be a criminal. On the run, the naive Hawkeye met Black Widow, a spy for the Soviet Union, with whom he fell in love. Mindlessly following Black Widow, Hawkeye aided her attempts to steal technology developed by Tony Stark (Iron Man). In one of their battles with Iron Man, Black Widow was seriously injured. Hawkeye rescued her and fled the battle to save her life. But before Hawkeye could take her to a hospital, Black Widow disappeared. Hawkeye decided to be a "straight-shooter" from then on.

=== Avengers ===
Hawkeye later rescues Edwin Jarvis and his mother from a mugger. In gratitude, Jarvis invites Hawkeye to Avengers Mansion and stages a confrontation to allow the archer to clear his name and gain the trust of the Avengers. Hawkeye is then sponsored by his former enemy Iron Man, who sees that he is serious about becoming a hero. Led by Captain America, Hawkeye joins the team along with Quicksilver and the Scarlet Witch to form the second incarnation of the Avengers. Almost straight away, Hawkeye clashes with his fellow Avengers. His romantic intentions towards the Scarlet Witch are met with hostility from her brother, Quicksilver. Hawkeye rebels against Captain America's leadership (due to his past problems with authority figures), but over time comes to respect him as a mentor and a friend. When the Swordsman attempted to join the Avengers, Hawkeye warned them of his previous history with the villain.

Clint Barton as the second Goliath on the cover of Avengers #63 (April 1969). Art by Gene Colan.

Hawkeye enjoys many adventures with the Avengers and proves himself a hero on numerous occasions. However, when his bow breaks during a crucial moment in a battle, Clint decides to adopt the Goliath costume and identity, succeeding Hank Pym. Barton (as Goliath) was later approached by his brother Barney Barton who was now a big-time racketeer. Barney had learned of Egghead's plans to construct an orbiting laser death-ray to extort money from the United States and came to the Avengers for help. The Avengers confronted Egghead's allies, the Mad Thinker and the Puppet Master. Tragically, Barney died in the ensuing battle; It was later revealed that Barney Barton was actually an undercover FBI agent. Soon after this encounter, Egghead hires the Swordsman to capture Goliath (thinking him to be Pym instead of Clint). Clint defeats and captures both criminals, finding justice for his brother at last. At the conclusion of the Kree-Skrull War Clint resumes the identity of Hawkeye with a new costume. After several adventures, Hawkeye quits the Avengers after a bitter rift with the Vision over the affections of the Scarlet Witch. Barton returns to his original Hawkeye costume and strikes out on his own.

Hawkeye returns to the Avengers when the current members of the team begin to mysteriously disappear. The remaining Avengers discover it to be the work of the Collector of the Elders of the Universe. After his teammates were all defeated, Hawkeye single-handedly defeats the Collector, and joins the team for the final battle against Korvac. Afterwards, Hawkeye's victory is dashed when the Avengers' new government liaison Henry Peter Gyrich limits the roster and replaces him with the Falcon, in an attempt to make the team more "politically acceptable". After initially failing to find work in his civilian identity, Hawkeye gains employment with Cross Technological Enterprises as the Head of Security.

=== Marriage to Mockingbird ===
Returning to Cross Technological Enterprises, Hawkeye meets the former S.H.I.E.L.D. agent Barbara "Bobbi" Morse, also known as the hero Mockingbird. Together, they discover that Crossfire, cousin of the company's original owner Darren Cross, was hatching a plot to destroy the superhero community via an aggression-inducing sonic weapon. Hawkeye and Mockingbird manage to defeat him (although Hawkeye is rendered 80% deaf when he uses a sonic arrow to counter Crossfire's weapon) and the two heroes get married shortly afterwards. At the direction of then-Avengers chair the Vision, Hawkeye (now using a hearing aid) and Mockingbird travel to Los Angeles to establish a west coast branch of the Avengers, known as the West Coast Avengers. While searching for a base of operations, Hawkeye and Mockingbird battle a vengeful Crossfire, who had recently broken out of prison. They manage to defeat the supervillain, aided by former actress Moira Brandon, who later allows her mansion to become the new Avengers Compound. On one of the West Coast Avengers adventures, when the team was lost in time, Mockingbird was kidnapped by an Old Western hero called Lincoln Slade, the Phantom Rider. The Phantom Rider drugs Mockingbird, convinces her that they are in love, and forces her to engage in a sexual relationship. Mockingbird soon regains her senses. In the resulting battle between the two, Mockingbird allows the Phantom Rider to fall to his death. Afterwards, when Mockingbird confesses what she did, Hawkeye is stunned that his wife would allow a man to die instead of facing justice. Their relationship becomes frayed as Mockingbird leaves the West Coast Avengers and separates from Hawkeye.

Hawkeye is challenged to a duel to the death by his former mentor Trick Shot. Hawkeye reluctantly accepts the challenge and wins. Trick Shot reveals that he is dying of cancer and wants to die honorably in battle. Hawkeye, instead of granting his former mentor's wish, promises to fund his medical care. Later, when Crossfire places a bounty on Hawkeye's right arm, Trick Shot (whose cancer had gone into remission) returns to aid his former pupil. Along with Mockingbird, the two archers defeat an army of supervillains looking to lay claim to the bounty. After this altercation with Crossfire, Hawkeye tells Mockingbird that he was wrong to blame her for what happened with the Phantom Rider. The pair soon reconcile.

The West Coast Avengers are then caught in the middle of a supernatural battle between Mephisto and Satannish. The team are able to defeat the two demons and force them back to their own realms. However, Mephisto retaliates by firing energy blasts at the escaping West Coast Avengers. Mockingbird sacrifices herself to save Hawkeye and dies in her husband's arms. Embittered by Mockingbird's death, Hawkeye leaves the team, which is disbanded almost immediately afterwards. Hawkeye isolates himself in the Canadian Rockies to separate himself from the world. He is soon forced to battle the Secret Empire. He manages to defeat Viper, the leader of the Secret Empire, and her hired supervillains, Javelynn and his old mentor Trick Shot.

Hawkeye returns to the Avengers just prior to the battle with the entity Onslaught, in which the Avengers (including Hawkeye) are apparently killed. Franklin Richards, however, transported them all to a pocket universe where the heroes led altered lives. The heroes eventually learned the truth and they were returned to their own universe. Hawkeye's hearing was fully restored because, when Franklin Richards recreated the heroes in the new universe, he based them on how he remembered them.

=== Thunderbolts ===
When the Avengers returned, they were abducted by Morgan le Fay and later they fought the Squadron Supreme. Then Hawkeye aids Avenger trainees Justice and Firestar to defeat the Taskmaster and Albino. but he later resigns the team to assume leadership of the first generation of the Thunderbolts, who had broken away from the influence of Helmut Zemo. Disguised as Dreadknight, he contacted the team and later he trained them in the fashion of former teammate Captain America, to try to shaped them into a cohesive fighting unit. Hawkeye begins a romantic relationship with fellow Thunderbolts member Moonstone who Hawkeye is proving to be a good influence on. Later, Hawkeye and the Thunderbolts travel to Hell to save the soul of Mockingbird. They defeat the demonic Mephisto, but Hawkeye is unable to find his wife. To ensure that his Thunderbolts are given full pardons, Hawkeye allows himself to be arrested in their place. The Thunderbolts' past crimes are erased on the condition that they retire from costumed heroics. The team reluctantly agrees. Later, when Hawkeye had gotten out of prison, the team comes back together to defeat Graviton once again. Convinced that they are ready to be heroes in their own right, Hawkeye hands leadership of the Thunderbolts to Citizen V (whose mind was actually under the control of Baron Zemo) and leaves the team.

=== Death ===
Hawkeye joins the Avengers once more, and begins a brief romantic relationship with team member Wasp. He also embarks on some solo adventures where he uncovers a plot to steal an ancient artifact in Laos, and investigates the murder of a former Soviet colonel. The Scarlet Witch, driven mad by her powers, causes a Kree warship to appear over the skies of New York. The Avengers, surprised by the appearance of the spacecraft, spring into battle. During the battle, Hawkeye's quiver of arrows is set on fire. Knowing that the explosive arrows were going to blow up faster than he could remove them, Hawkeye flies into the engines of the Kree warship, destroying the spacecraft and sacrificing himself to save his teammates. A past version of Hawkeye is also plucked from time by the Time Variance Authority to serve as a juror in a case involving former Avengers teammate She-Hulk. She-Hulk tries unsuccessfully to warn Hawkeye as to his future.

=== Revival ===
When the Scarlet Witch inadvertently alters reality, Hawkeye is resurrected with no memory of previous events. When young mutant Layla Miller gives several heroes (including Hawkeye) the ability to remember, he is horrified at the Scarlet Witch's actions. Hawkeye shoots Wanda in the back with an arrow. In retaliation, one of her recreated children wipes Hawkeye from existence, killing him once more. When the Scarlet Witch's reality is eventually undone, Hawkeye is still presumed dead. However, the recently formed New Avengers find his bow and arrows on the site of the old Avengers Mansion, pinning up an article about his death.

=== Return and New Avengers ===
Unknown to the New Avengers, Hawkeye is resurrected once reality was restored. He seeks out Doctor Strange who offers Hawkeye shelter while he comes to terms with his new life. Against the advice of Dr. Strange, Hawkeye eventually travels to Mount Wundagore and finds the Scarlet Witch living a normal life with no memory of her past and apparently without mutant abilities. The two become intimate and Hawkeye then leaves Wanda to her normal life. Returning to the United States, Hawkeye learns about the assassination of Captain America. He confronts Tony Stark, who then offers Hawkeye the Captain America shield and costume to continue the legacy. Hawkeye is later inspired by the words of Kate Bishop, whom he met while hiding his identity, and rejects Stark's offer.

Hawkeye returns to see Dr. Strange and meets the New Avengers. The team invites Hawkeye to join the team. Hawkeye accepts, and accompanies the team on a mission to Japan to rescue Echo. However, leaving behind his Hawkeye identity, Clint Barton takes on the disguise of Ronin. Echo, the original Ronin, later gives Barton her blessing to adopt her old identity. Clint later meets Kate Bishop again, but this time reveals his true identity, much to Kate's surprise. Impressed with Kate's skill with a bow, and the fact she reminds him of himself at her age, Clint blesses Kate to continue using the Hawkeye codename.

Clint (as Ronin) was part of the New Avengers team that head to the Savage Land after a tip from Spider-Woman that a Skrull ship had crash landed there. Emerging from the crashed ship was a selection of heroes claiming to have been abducted, one of which was Mockingbird. Clint believes that she is the real Mockingbird until Mister Fantastic's invention proves that the heroes from the Skrull ship were all imposters. Later, after the war for Earth was won, Clint is reunited with the real Mockingbird, who was revealed to have been held captive by the Skrulls for years.

=== Dark Reign and Siege ===
Clint attempts to help Mockingbird as she tries to adapt to life back on Earth. He accompanies her to Zaragoza, Spain, to battle Monica Rappaccini and the hordes of A.I.M. in an effort to deactivate a "dirty bomb" designed by the evil scientific group. Despite their years apart, Clint and Mockingbird battle with comfort and understanding. They manage to defeat A.I.M. and foil their evil plot.

At the conclusion of the Skrull war, S.H.I.E.L.D. is dissolved and Norman Osborn is placed in power of national security. Osborn creates his own team of villainous Avengers by stealing the costumed identities of previous Avengers. The supervillain assassin Bullseye joins the team and takes on the Hawkeye mantle. Watching the Avengers news coverage on television with the rest of the New Avengers, Clint is stunned to see the events taking place. Clint unmasked himself on network television and publicly denounces Osborn's regime. He is later elected as the leader of the New Avengers and makes toppling Osborn and the Hood from power his number one priority. Clint argues that the only way to beat Osborn is to kill him, although the rest of the team disagrees. Clint attempts to storm Avengers Tower single-handedly to achieve his goal. He defeats the Dark Avengers, but is captured and arrested when, after failing to kill Osborn, he is attacked from behind by Ares. Clint was imprisoned and tortured at the hands of Mentallo. He was later freed by his teammates and apologized for his actions.

=== Heroic Age ===
During the "Heroic Age", Steve Rogers puts together a new team of Avengers. Clint joins the team and returns to his Hawkeye identity. Although he encourages Kate Bishop to keep the Hawkeye identity as well. He and Mockingbird are also members of the New Avengers, Although Hawkeye later leaves the New Avengers when he receives an Avengers priority call from the main team, claiming that he was only there to spend time with his wife.

Hawkeye aids Mockingbird and her anti-terrorist organization, the World Counter-terrorism Agency. Together, they thwart Crossfire's illegal arms operation, and encounter Lincoln Slade's descendant, Jaime Slade, who later goes onto become the new Phantom Rider. Crossfire and the new Phantom Rider team-up to battle the heroes. This feud has its casualties with Mockingbird's mother being severely wounded and the death of Hamilton Slade, both at the hands of Crossfire. Hawkeye leaves the W.C.A. after it becomes clear that his relationship with Mockingbird has become too strained. However, he quickly rejoins after being informed by Steve Rogers that a kill list of international spies includes Mockingbird.

Hawkeye and Mockingbird team up with Black Widow to take on the mysterious new Ronin and the Dark Ocean Society. The new Ronin is later revealed to be Alexei Shostakov, the former Red Guardian and ex-husband of Black Widow. During the final battle with the new Ronin, Hawkeye receives a strong blow to the head. When the battle is won, he assures Mockingbird and Black Widow that he suffered no ill effects from the blow. The blow to the head that Hawkeye received proves to be more serious than first thought. While battling the Lethal Legion with the Avengers, Hawkeye's aim is shown to be faltering. After the battle, Tony Stark, Donald Blake and Steve Rogers examine Hawkeye to discover what is causing it. Their diagnosis is that Hawkeye is steadily losing his sight and will soon go blind. Barney Barton, who has since taken up the Trick Shot mantle, agrees to a bone marrow transplant to save his brother's sight, but only so he could battle Hawkeye again in the future.

=== Shattered Heroes ===
Following the "Fear Itself" storyline, the Avengers Academy is reopened in Palos Verdes at the former West Coast Avengers headquarters, where Barton accepts an offer to become a teacher. The character receives a new costume in Avengers vol. 4 #18. Cullen Bunn, writer of Captain America & Hawkeye, stated the costume was influenced slightly by The Avengers film. In 2012, Hawkeye becomes the leader of the Secret Avengers. The 2012 critically acclaimed Hawkeye vol. 4 solo series focuses on Hawkeye defending an apartment building from the Tracksuit Mafia with the assistance of Kate and his brother Barney. This series also reintroduces Hawkeye as a deaf character after a mercenary known as Kazi the Clown jammed two of Hawkeye's arrows into his ears.

Hawkeye became a member of the New Avengers led by Sunspot at the request of S.H.I.E.L.D., who are suspicious of Sunspot's activities and want Clint to spy on them. However, during a conflict, Hawkeye is fired from S.H.I.E.L.D. due to deciding to side with the New Avengers against them and following Songbird's betrayal of the team as a S.H.I.E.L.D. double agent.

=== Civil War II ===
During the Civil War II storyline, Hawkeye shoots Bruce Banner in the head with an arrow in light of Ulysses Cain's vision of a rampaging Hulk standing over the corpses of the dead superheroes. During the Avengers-presided trial, Hawkeye stated that Banner approached him and asked for Hawkeye to kill him if he ever became Hulk again. Hawkeye is acquitted of all charges, though his actions heavily divided the superhero community in the Ulysses conflict.

=== Occupy Avengers ===
In the pages of "Occupy Avengers", Clint starts traveling the country and focuses his efforts towards helping the underprivileged with community based problems in an effort to redeem his actions from the event, beginning with the water supply in Santa Rosa. He eventually gains the aid of the Red Wolf of Earth-51920 to help him fight for those who cannot defend themselves.

=== Secret Empire ===
In the "Secret Empire" storyline, Captain America leads Hydra's takeover of the United States. Hawkeye becomes the leader of the few free heroes left in the country (the others are either trapped outside Earth's atmosphere, trapped in New York, or working with Hydra). After Rick Jones is able to send information to the heroes revealing that Captain America has been "brainwashed" by Kobik to believe that he has been a Hydra agent since childhood, Hawkeye is one of the heroes favoring the idea that they can recover the fragmented cube and use it to restore Rogers to normal, in opposition to Black Widow's plan to just kill Rogers and stop him. Despite their opposing viewpoints, Hawkeye falls back in love with Black Widow and is devastated by her supposed death at the hands of the evil Steve Rogers.

=== Fresh Start ===
Shortly after Natasha's supposed death, a number of her enemies have been killed off. Hawkeye and Winter Soldier start investigating the trail of bodies left behind to uncover the mysterious assassin and determine if Black Widow is still alive. They eventually discover that she was cloned by the Black Widow Ops Program following her death. When Winter Soldier and Hawkeye arrive at the Red Room, the Black Widow clone drops her cover and begins killing her superiors, liberating the recruits, and destroying all the clones and Epsilon Red. When authorities arrive, Black Widow leaves the Red Room, leaving a note for Hawkeye to stop following her and for Winter Soldier to join her in ending the Red Room.

During the "Fresh Start" relaunch, Clint and Kate decided to revive the West Coast Avengers following an attack by land sharks in Santa Monica. For that, they recruited America Chavez and Kate's boyfriend Johnny "Fuse" Watts, who helped in the mission, and were eventually joined by Gwenpool and Kid Omega. Given their lack of funds, the newly formed team tried to get financiers by starring in a reality show following their exploits.

=== Freefall ===
After successfully arresting Hood, Clint is outraged to learn that the court let Hood go free while sending his underlings to jail. During this time, he is also dating Linda Carter. Shortly afterwards, someone dressed as Ronin begins attacking and robbing the Hood's facilities around New York. As Hood hunts down Ronin, Clint struggles to maintain his relationship with Linda and continue to lie to the other heroes. This comes to a head when Hood hires Bullseye, who steals Clint's Ronin costume to frame him for murder. Clint confronts Hood and defeats him by removing his powers with Count Nefaria's help.

=== Thunderbolts (Revival) ===
Following the events of "Freefall", Luke Cage, now mayor of New York City, asks Clint to lead a new Thunderbolts team that would operate as the only legally sanctioned super-hero team in the city, to which Clint accepts. The team consists of America Chavez, Power Man (Víctor Álvarez), Guston Glory, Eegro the Unbreakable, Persuasion and Spectrum. At a press meeting, Clint hallucinates Black Widow and Mockingbird berating him for his past. His hallucination is cut short when the city is attacked by Nightmare. Nightmare reveals that most of the events are a product of Nightmare's manipulations, including Clint rekindling his relationship with Mockingbird. Nightmare wants to use America Chavez's powers to dimension-hop to absorb the nightmares of the multiverse. Nightmare causes the team to hear voices that prey on their insecurities. Nightmare mocks Clint, commenting on his leadership skills and selfishness, going as far as to urge Clint to die. The team ultimately prevails and is put on a probation due to their property damage. Clint agrees to keep leading the team. Clint contacts Mockingbird, asking her to get coffee with him, to which she agrees.

== Skills and abilities ==
While Clint Barton has no superhuman powers (with the exception of the period when using Pym particles as Goliath), he is at the very peak of human conditioning. He is an exceptional fencer, acrobat and marksman, having been trained from childhood in the circus and by the criminals Trick Shot and Swordsman. This includes considerable strength, as an employee of Cross Technological Enterprises found out when he tried to use the superhero's 250 pounds-force (1,100 newtons) draw-weight bow and found that he could not draw back the string to launch an arrow.

Hawkeye has also been thoroughly trained by Captain America in tactics, martial arts, and hand-to-hand combat. Hawkeye excels in the use of ranged weapons, especially the bow and arrow and carries a quiver containing a number of customized "trick arrows". As Ronin, he shows great proficiency with the katana and other melee weapons. He has gained a reputation for being able to "turn any object into a weapon", and has been seen using items such as tin plates, coins, sticks, and other debris to great effect against his enemies.

Hawkeye is also known to use a "Sky-Cycle" as his mode of transportation. The Sky-Cycle is modeled after a commercial snowmobile and is fitted with anti-gravitational technology. It is voice-operated and has an auto-pilot steering system. The original Sky-Cycle was custom-made for Hawkeye by Jorge Latham while employed by Cross Technological Enterprises. Latham was later employed by the West Coast Avengers and built several more.

== Other versions ==
A number of alternate versions of Hawkeye appear in stories set outside the main Marvel continuity

=== Amalgam Comics ===
Oliver Queen in the Amalgam Comics universe is Goliath, a composite character with elements of Hawkeye.

=== All-New Hawkeye ===
In All-New Hawkeye, Clint and Kate give up Project Communion (Inhuman orphans with powerful and dangerous psionic abilities) to Hydra after failing to protect them. An alternate future is shown where Clint and Kate split up for twenty years. An older Clint has retired from heroics until Kate arrives and forces Clint to help with a mission. Kate at this point has made an entire organization stemmed from the Hawkeye name, and is generally recognized as Hawkeye by other heroes and villains due to Clint's absence. This future is averted when Clint and Kate rescue the children in the past.

=== Earth-398 ===
In the Avengers storyline "Queen's Vengeance," Morgan Le Fay creates a medieval alternate universe where Clint Barton is part of her elite guard, the Queen's Vengeance. Barton is the second Avenger to break free from the illusion with help from Captain America.

==== Earth-13584 ====
On Earth-13584, Hawkeye appears as a member of Spider-Man's gang.

=== Marvel Zombies ===
In Marvel Zombies Hawkeye was one of the first heroes zombified by Sentry, and goes on a rampage with the other zombified Avengers. During the fight against Magneto, Hawkeye is beheaded by Magneto. 40 years later, his still-living head is discovered by T'Challa's grandson and given a robotic body as it appears his hunger has diminished. He is killed by a rampaging Hulk and given a funeral with the other fallen heroes.

=== MC2 ===
In the MC2 universe, Hawkeye is retired from superhero work due to his blindness. He continues to serve as a combat trainer for new heroes.

=== Old Man Logan ===
In the alternate future of Old Man Logan, an old and blind Hawkeye hires Logan to help him deliver a secret package to New Babylon (formerly Washington D.C.). He has had three ex-wives, the third of which was Peter Parker's youngest daughter Tonya. He had a daughter with her named Ashley; after learning that Ashley has been captured by the Kingpin after attempting to overthrow him as a new Spider-Woman, alongside a new Daredevil and Punisher, Hawkeye convinces Logan to take a detour with him to rescue her. However, upon doing so, Ashley kills the Kingpin. Barton attempts to deliver a batch of Super Soldier Serums to a supposed underground league planning to form a group similar to the Avengers, but it turns out it was a set-up by the Red Skull, which results in Hawkeye's death.

This version of Hawkeye received his own miniseries titled Old Man Hawkeye, which explores his life five years before the events of Old Man Logan.

=== Secret Wars ===
Several alternate universe versions of Hawkeye appear in the "Secret Wars" storyline:

- In Amazing Spider-Man: Renew Your Vows, Hawkeye is the leader of a resistance against Regent.
- In the Secret Wars version of House of M, Hawkeye is part of a resistance against the mutant-dominated society.
- In Civil War, Hawkeye was bonded to the Venom symbiote and sided with Captain America during the Civil War conflict.
- A 2099 version of Hawkeye appears as part of Alchemax's Avengers team in Secret Wars 2099. His name is Max and his DNA was mixed with a hawk giving him the claws and wings of a hawk.

=== Ultimate Marvel ===
The Ultimate Marvel imprint title the Ultimates features a version of Hawkeye who uses a cover story of being a former Olympic archer to hide his conviction of an unexplained murder charge. When he was recruited by Nick Fury into the Ultimates program, a government sponsored program made up of humans with extraordinary abilities and super-human operatives. During his time with the Ultimates, most, if not all, of his missions were of the Black Ops variety in which he partnered with Black Widow, who turned out to be a traitor to the group and killed Barton's wife and children.

=== Ultimate Universe ===
An alternate version of Clint Barton appears in the Ultimate Universe imprint. This version owed money to Roxxon and was forced to work for them as Ronin. Hawkeye (Charli Ramsay) faces off against Ronin in Exterminatrix's Pit of Despair and wins, but refuses to kill Clint. In response, Exterminatrix shoots Clint, turning him to gold.

=== Warp World ===
In "Infinity Wars", Cat's Eye is a composite character with elements of Hellcat.

=== What If? Dark Reign ===
In What If? Dark Reign, Clint Barton succeeds in killing Norman Osborn. The superhero community then hunts him down for his crimes, while the public and the government turn completely against superheroes. While Mockingbird gives him what he needs to escape, he ends up being shot and killed by a mentally unstable man who wants to prove a point against superheroes.

== In other media ==
=== Television ===
- Clint Barton / Hawkeye appears in The Marvel Super Heroes, voiced by Chris Wiggins.
- Clint Barton / Hawkeye appears in Iron Man, voiced by John Reilly. This version is a member of Force Works.
- Clint Barton / Goliath makes a cameo appearance in the Fantastic Four episode "To Battle the Living Planet".
- Clint Barton / Hawkeye appears in The Avengers: United They Stand, voiced by Tony Daniels. This version is a member of the Avengers.
- Clint Barton / Hawkeye appears in The Super Hero Squad Show, voiced by Adrian Pasdar.
- Clint Barton / Hawkeye appears in The Avengers: Earth's Mightiest Heroes, voiced by Chris Cox. This version is initially a member of S.H.I.E.L.D. before joining the Avengers.
- A teenage Clint Barton / Hawkeye appears in Iron Man: Armored Adventures, voiced by Andrew Francis. This version is initially a freelancer before joining S.H.I.E.L.D.
- Clint Barton / Hawkeye appears in Ultimate Spider-Man, voiced by Troy Baker. This version is a member of the Avengers.
- Clint Barton / Hawkeye appears in Avengers Assemble, voiced again by Troy Baker. This version is a member of the Avengers. Additionally, he temporarily becomes Goliath following an accident in the episode "One Little Thing".
- Clint Barton / Hawkeye appears in Marvel Disk Wars: The Avengers, voiced by Eiji Takemoto in the Japanese version and by Christopher Corey Smith in the English dub.
- Clint Barton / Hawkeye appears in Guardians of the Galaxy, voiced again by Troy Baker. This version is a member of the Avengers.
- Clint Barton / Hawkeye appears in Marvel Future Avengers, voiced by Kiyoshi Katsunuma in the Japanese version and voiced again by Christopher Corey Smith in the English dub.
- Clint Barton / Hawkeye appears in Iron Man and His Awesome Friends, voiced by Nick A. Fisher.

=== Film ===
- Clint Barton / Hawkeye and his son Francis Barton both appear in Next Avengers: Heroes of Tomorrow.
- Clint Barton / Hawkeye appears in Iron Man: Rise of Technovore, voiced by Troy Baker.
- Clint Barton / Hawkeye appears in Avengers Confidential: Black Widow & Punisher, voiced by an uncredited Matthew Mercer.
- Clint Barton / Hawkeye appears in Lego Marvel Super Heroes: Avengers Reassembled, voiced again by Troy Baker.

=== Marvel Cinematic Universe ===
Jeremy Renner portrays Clint Barton as Hawkeye and Ronin in the live-action Marvel Cinematic Universe films Thor, The Avengers, Avengers: Age of Ultron, Captain America: Civil War, and Avengers: Endgame, as well as the live-action Disney+ series Hawkeye. Additionally, Renner voices alternate timeline versions of the character in the animated Disney+ series What If...?. Renner will reprise the role in the film Avengers: Doomsday.

=== Video games ===
- Clint Barton / Hawkeye appears as a playable character in Spider-Man: The Video Game.
- Clint Barton / Hawkeye appears as a playable character in Captain America and the Avengers.
- Clint Barton / Hawkeye appears as an assist character in Venom/Spider-Man: Separation Anxiety.
- Evil clones of Clint Barton / Hawkeye appear in Marvel Super Heroes in War of the Gems.
- Clint Barton / Hawkeye appears as a playable character in the PSP version of Marvel: Ultimate Alliance, voiced by Nolan North. He also appears in the downloadable "Heroes and Villains" version for the Xbox 360.
- Clint Barton / Hawkeye appears as a playable character in Ultimate Marvel vs. Capcom 3, voiced by Chris Cox. Additionally, his Ronin identity appears as an alternate costume.
- Clint Barton / Hawkeye appears as a playable character in Marvel Super Hero Squad Online, voiced by Sam Riegel.
- Clint Barton / Hawkeye appears as a playable character in Marvel Avengers Alliance.
- Clint Barton / Hawkeye appears as a playable character in Marvel Avengers: Battle for Earth, voiced by Troy Baker.
- Clint Barton / Hawkeye appears in LittleBigPlanet as part of the "Marvel Costume Kit 6" DLC.
- Clint Barton / Hawkeye appears as a playable character in Marvel Heroes, voiced again by Chris Cox. Additionally, his Ronin identity appears as an alternate costume.
- Clint Barton / Hawkeye appears as a playable character in Lego Marvel Super Heroes, voiced again by Troy Baker.
- Clint Barton, as Hawkeye and Ronin, appears as a playable character in Marvel: Contest of Champions.
- Clint Barton / Hawkeye appears as a playable character in Marvel Avengers Alliance Tactics.
- Clint Barton / Hawkeye appears in Disney Infinity 2.0, voiced again by Troy Baker.
- Clint Barton, as Hawkeye and Ronin, appears as a playable character in Marvel: Future Fight.
- Clint Barton / Hawkeye appears as a playable character in Lego Marvel's Avengers, voiced by Jeremy Renner.
- Clint Barton / Hawkeye appears in Disney Infinity 3.0, voiced again by Troy Baker.
- A teenage version of Clint Barton / Hawkeye appears in Marvel Avengers Academy, voiced by Gus Sorola.
- Five incarnations of Clint Barton / Hawkeye appear as playable characters in Marvel Puzzle Quest.
- Clint Barton / Hawkeye appears as a playable character in Marvel vs. Capcom: Infinite, voiced again by Chris Cox.
- Clint Barton / Hawkeye appears as a playable character in Marvel Powers United VR, voiced again by Chris Cox.
- Clint Barton / Hawkeye appears as a playable character in Lego Marvel Super Heroes 2, voiced by Dar Dash.
- Clint Barton / Hawkeye appears as a playable character in Marvel Ultimate Alliance 3: The Black Order, voiced again by Chris Cox.
- Clint Barton / Hawkeye appears as a playable DLC character in Marvel's Avengers, voiced by Giacomo Gionniotti.
- Clint Barton / Hawkeye appears as a cosmetic outfit in Fortnite.
- Clint Barton / Hawkeye appears as a playable character in Marvel Rivals, voiced by Andrew Kishino. Additionally, his Ronin and Hawkeye: Freefall outfits are available as alternate costumes.

=== Miscellaneous ===
- Clint Barton / Hawkeye appears in Marvel Universe Live! as a member of the Avengers.
- Old Man Hawkeye appears in Marvel's Wastelanders: Old Man Hawkeye, voiced by Stephen Lang.

== Reception and legacy ==
Hawkeye was ranked as the 45th Greatest Comic Book Character of All Time by Wizard magazine. IGN also ranked Hawkeye as the 44th Greatest Comic Book Hero of All Time opining that only it takes a special kind of hero to parade around in blue and purple and battle deadly villains with nothing more than a satchel of arrows and only Hawkeye can successfully pull it off, and as #9 on their list of "The Top 50 Avengers" in 2012. In 2013, ComicsAlliance ranked Hawkeye as #27 on their list of the "50 Sexiest Male Characters in Comics".

The fourth volume of Hawkeye has received favorable reviews for its focus on what Hawkeye does when he's not an Avenger, playing up his status as the "everyman" on the team. Praising the series in an article titled, "How did Hawkeye become Marvel's best comic?", The A.V. Club wrote, "Spider-Man has long been considered Marvel's superhero everyman, but Hawkeye has stolen that title with this series." ComicsAlliance's Chris Sims summarized it as, "For (Hawkeye), everything that happens in the book is a pain, but it's something he deals with because he wants to help the people around him, to the degree that he's driven to do so even on his days off from literally saving the world." In 2013, Hawkeye was nominated for five Eisner Awards, winning two: Best Cover Artist and Best Penciler/Inker, and nominated for seven Harvey Awards, winning one. In 2014, Hawkeye was nominated for five Eisner Awards, winning two, and nominated for five Harvey Awards, winning one.

One of the series' most well received issues was the "Pizza Dog" issue (No. 11), which is told from the perspective of Barton's dog, Lucky. Wired Magazine said of the issue, "The conceit is a high-concept, high-wire act for a comic to carry off, but Fraction and Aja stick the landing with a poise and grace that deserves full marks ... It manages to be both a functional murder mystery loaded with noir sensibilities – from the bloody paw prints that blot across the cover to a rooftop gun scuffle with neighborhood thugs – and a book that is as entertaining as it is experimental and worth reading a time or ten."

The character gained renewed visibility in December 2012 with the founding of The Hawkeye Initiative, a Tumblr page in which artists and cosplayers redrew the exaggerated, sexualized poses commonly given to female superheroes using Hawkeye's body instead, intending to expose such poses as impractical and objectifying when performed by a male character. Matthew Cicci has linked the project's choice of Hawkeye specifically to his long-established status as the Avengers' physically ordinary "everyman," arguing that his status made the substitution viable in a way a more masculine hero would not. The project drew coverage from mainstream outlets including Vulture and Wired.

In 2012, the mother of 4-year-old Anthony Smith contacted Marvel because her son would not wear his hearing aid, as superheroes do not have to. Marvel responded with a custom comic book of the superhero Blue Ear for Anthony, and also pointed out that for years Hawkeye was deaf and used hearing aids.

== Collected editions ==
Hawkeye's solo appearances have been collected in a number of trade paperbacks:

=== Marvel Epic Collections ===
Volume	Subtitle	Years covered	Issues collected	Pages	Publication date	ISBN
1	The Avenging Archer	1964–1988	Hawkeye #1-4; Avengers #16, 63–65, 189, 223; Marvel Team-Up #22, 92, 95; Captain America #317; material from Tales of Suspense #57, 60, 64; Marvel Tales #100; Marvel Fanfare #3, 39; Marvel Super Action #1	432	January 11, 2022	978-1302934484
2	The Way of the Arrow	1987–1989	Solo Avengers #1-20, Avengers Spotlight #21	496	October 10, 2023	978-1302953348
3	Marked for Death	1989–1991	Avengers Spotlight #22-40; material from Marvel Comics Presents vol. 1 #83	456	December 16, 2025	978-1302965198
4	Shafted	1994–2008	Hawkeye (vol. 2) #1-4; Hawkeye (vol. 3) #1-8; Hawkeye: Earth's Mightiest Marksman #1; Avengers #502; The Pulse #10; New Avengers #26, 30; Young Avengers Presents #6; and material from Marvel Comics Presents #159-161	480	December 10, 2024	978-1302956516

=== Modern Era Epic Collections ===
Volume	Subtitle	Years covered	Issues collected	Pages	Publication date	ISBN
1	The Reunion	2009–2011	New Avengers: The Reunion #1-4; Hawkeye & Mockingbird #1-6; Widowmaker #1-4; Hawkeye: Blindspot #1-4; Hawkeye & Mockingbird Sketchbook #1; and material from Dark Reign: New Nation #1; Enter the Heroic Age #1	480	July 2, 2024	978-1302956530

=== Main collections ===
Title	Material collected	Publication date	ISBN
Hawkeye	Hawkeye Vol.1 #1–4	June 1988	978-0871353641
Avengers: Hawkeye	Hawkeye Vol.1 #1–4, Tales of Suspense #57, Marvel Super Action #1, Avengers #189, Marvel Team-Up #95	March 2010	978-0785137238
Hawkeye & Mockingbird: Ghosts	Hawkeye & Mockingbird #1–6, Enter the Heroic Age #1	January 2011	978-0785144182
Avengers: Hawkeye: Earth's Mightiest Marksman	Hawkeye Vol. 2 #1-4, Hawkeye: Earth's Mightiest Marksman #1; Material from Marvel Comics Presents #159-161	February 2012	978-0785159391
Widowmaker	Widowmaker #1–4	April 2011	978-0785152057
Hawkeye: Blindspot	Hawkeye: Blindspot #1–4	July 2011	978-0785156000
New Avengers: The Reunion	New Avengers: The Reunion #1–4, Dark Reign: New Nation #1	March 2010	978-0785138556
Hawkeye: Avenging Archer	New Avengers: The Reunion 1–4, Hawkeye & Mockingbird 1–6, Widowmaker 1–4, Hawkeye: Blindspot 1–4, Hawkeye & Mockingbird Saga	April 2015	978-0785194057
Avengers: Hawkeye Solo	Avengers Solo #1-5	April 2012	978-0785160717
Hawkeye, Vol. 1: My Life as a Weapon	Hawkeye Vol. 4 #1-5, Young Avengers Presents #6	March 2013	978-0785165620
Hawkeye, Vol. 2: Little Hits	Hawkeye Vol. 4 #6-11	June 2013	978-0785165637
Hawkeye, Vol. 3: L.A. Woman	Hawkeye Vol. 4 #14, 16, 18, 20, Annual #1	October 21, 2014	978-0785183907
Hawkeye, Vol. 4: Rio Bravo	Hawkeye Vol. 4 #12-13, #15, #17, #19, #21-22	August 4, 2015	978-0785185314
Hawkeye, Vol. 5: All-New Hawkeye	All-New Hawkeye, Vol. 1 #1-5	November 17, 2015	978-0785194033
Hawkeye, Vol. 6: Hawkeyes	All-New Hawkeye, Vol. 2 #1-6	July 5, 2016	978-0785199465
Hawkeye, Vol. 1 Hardcover	Hawkeye Vol. 4 #1-11, Young Avengers Presents #6	November 19, 2013	978-0785184874
Hawkeye, Vol. 2 Hardcover	Hawkeye Vol. 4 #12-22, Annual #1	December 22, 2015	978-0785154617
Hawkeye, Vol. 3 Hardcover	All-New Hawkeye #1-5, All-New Hawkeye, Vol. 2 #1-6	October 18, 2016	978-1302902193
Hawkeye by Matt Fraction & David Aja Omnibus	Hawkeye Vol. 4 #1-22, Annual #1, Young Avengers Presents #6	November 3, 2015	978-0785192190
Occupy Avengers Vol. 1: Taking Back Justice	Occupy Avengers #1-4 and Avengers (1963) #80-81	July 3, 2017	978-1302906382
Occupy Avengers Vol. 2: In Plain Sight	Occupy Avengers #5-9	October 10, 2017	978-1302906399
Old Man Hawkeye Vol. 1: An Eye for an Eye	Old Man Hawkeye #1-6	August 28, 2018	978-1302911249
Old Man Hawkeye Vol. 2: The Whole World Blind	Old Man Hawkeye #7-12	March 12, 2019	978-1302911256
