= Duane Swierczynski =

American crime writer (born 1972)

- Born: Duane Louis Swierczynski; February 22, 1972 (age 54); Philadelphia, Pennsylvania, U.S.
- Occupations: Journalist, author

Duane Louis Swierczynski (born February 22, 1972) is an American crime writer known for his work in non-fiction books, novels and comic books.

== Early life ==
Duane Swierczynski was born and raised in Frankford, a neighborhood in lower Northeast Philadelphia, Pennsylvania, United States. After leaving in the late 1990s and making several stops elsewhere, he moved to another neighborhood in Northeast Philadelphia from 2002 until 2016. He currently resides with his family in the Los Angeles area.

Swierczynski's surname loosely translates as "dweller near a spruce tree." He and his brother Gregg were named after the Allman Brothers.

== Career ==
Swierczynski has written six non-fiction books, including This Here's A Stick-Up: The Big Bad Book Of American Bank Robbery (Alpha, 2002) and The Big Book O’ Beer (Quirk, 2004).

He has worked as an editor at Men's Health and Details as well as Philadelphia magazines including the Philadelphia City Paper, which he left in February 2008.

Secret Dead Men, Swierczynski's crime fiction debut, was published in 2005 by PointBlank. He has since written nine further novels. His fiction draws heavily on crime noir themes, making frequent use of femmes fatale.

In 2008, Swierczynski signed an exclusive deal with Marvel Comics, where he penned Moon Knight Annual #1, a Punisher one-shot ("Force of Nature"), and the second volume of Cable, which lasted 24 issues. He also assumed writing duties on The Immortal Iron Fist from issue #18 until the title's cancellation. His other planned projects with Marvel included a revival of Werewolf By Night, a story starring Bishop, and contributing to the X-Men-related event Messiah War. He later wrote the 2012 rebooted Bloodshot series from Valiant Comics and the Black Hood series from Archie Comics beginning in 2015.

Lion's Gate Entertainment picked up Swierczynski's novel Severance Package for film treatment and hired Brett Simon to direct the film and co-write the script with Swierczynski.

Swierczynski is known for using a variety of social media tools, including Twitter and Blogspot.

In September 2011, DC Comics relaunched Birds of Prey with issue #1 as part of their The New 52 publishing initiative. Swierczynski replaced Marc Andreyko as the writer, with Jesus Saiz handling the art.

Swierczynski's 2024 novel California Bear won the 2025 Macavity Award for Best Mystery Novel.

== Personal life ==
Duane Swierczynski is married and has two children. His first-born son (born March 30, 2002), Parker, is named in honor of the Richard Stark character as well as Spider-Man's secret identity, Peter Parker. He also has a daughter (born July 15, 2003), Evelyn, or Evie for short. Evie passed from leukemia in November 2018.

== Works ==
=== Non-fiction ===
- This Here's A Stick-Up: The Big Bad Book Of American Bank Robbery (Alpha, 2002) ISBN 0-02-864344-5
- The Big Book O’ Beer (Quirk, 2004) ISBN 1-931686-49-1
- The Encyclopedia of the FBI's Ten Most Wanted List, 1950 to Present ISBN 0-8160-4560-7
- The Perfect Drink for Every Occasion (Quirk)
- The Spy's Guide: Office Espionage (Quirk)
- The Complete Idiot's Guide to Frauds, Scams, and Cons (Alpha)

=== Fiction ===
- Secret Dead Men (PointBlank, 2005) ISBN 1-930997-58-2
- The Wheelman (St. Martin's Press, 2005) ISBN 0-312-34377-9
- Damn Near Dead: An Anthology of Geezer Noir (Busted Flush Press, editor, 2006) ISBN 0-9767157-5-9
- The Blonde (St. Martin's Press, 2006) ISBN 0-312-34379-5
- Severance Package (St. Martin's Press, 2008) ISBN 0-312-36339-7
- Murder at Wayne Manor: An Interactive Batman Mystery (Quirk, 2008) ISBN 1-59474-237-5
- Expiration Date (Minotaur Books, 2010) ISBN 978-0-312-36340-6 (Winner of the 2011 Anthony award for Best Paperback Original)
- Canary (Mulholland Books, 2015) ISBN 978-0316403207
- Revolver (Mulholland Books, 2016) ISBN 978-0316403238
- The House Husband (with James Patterson, BookShots, 2017) ISBN 978-1786530981
- California Bear (Little, Brown and Company, 2024) ISBN 978-0316382977

=== Charlie Hardie Trilogy ===
- Fun and Games (Mulholland Books, 2011) ISBN 978-0-316-13328-9
- Hell and Gone (Mulholland Books, 2011) ISBN 978-0-316-13329-6
- Point and Shoot (Mulholland Books, 2013) ISBN 978-0-316-13330-2

=== Comics ===
- Moon Knight: Annual #1 (Marvel, 2007)
- Punisher: Force Of Nature (Marvel, 2008)
- Cable #1–25 (Marvel, 2008–2010)
- The Immortal Iron Fist #17–27 (with Travel Foreman, ongoing series, Marvel, 2008–2009)
- Immortal Iron Fist: The Death Queen of California (Marvel, 2008)
- Punisher: Frank Castle #66–70, #75 (Marvel, 2009)
- Dead of Night: Werewolf by Night #1-4 (Marvel, 2009)
- X-Men: The Times and Life of Lucas Bishop #1–3 (Marvel, 2009)
- Immortal Weapons #1-5 (Marvel, 2009-2010)
- Dark X-Men #1-5 (Marvel, 2010)
- Deadpool: Wade Wilson's War #1-4 (Marvel, 2010)
- X-Men: Hope #1 (Marvel, 2010)
- X-Men Origins: Deadpool #1 (Marvel, 2010)
- X-Men: Curse of the Mutants — Blade #1 (Marvel, 2010)
- Black Widow #6-8 (Marvel, 2010)
- Widowmaker #2, #4 (Marvel, 2010-2011)
- Birds of Prey #1-17, ongoing series, (DC, 2011-2013)
- Infestation 2 #1-2 (IDW, 2012)
- Infestation 2: 30 Days of Night #1 (IDW, 2012)
- Bloodshot #1-13, ongoing series, (Valiant Comics, 2012-2013)
- Godzilla #1-13, ongoing series, (IDW, 2012-2013)
- X #0-24, ongoing series, (Dark Horse, 2013-2015)
- Judge Dredd #1-30, ongoing series, (IDW, 2012-2015)
- Two Past Midnight #1-3 (Dark Horse, 2013)
- Harbinger Wars #1-4 (with Joshua Dysart, limited series, Valiant Comics, 2013)
- Deadpool vs. X-Force #1-4 (Marvel, 2014)
- The Black Hood vol. 4 #1-11, ongoing series, (Archie Comics, 2015-2016)
- The Black Hood vol. 5 #1-5 (Archie Comics, 2016-2017)
- Star Wars: Rogue One: Cassian & K-2SO #1 (Marvel, 2017)

=== Conferences ===
- NoirCon: 2007-2022 (Philadelphia, Pennsylvania)

Preceded by Richard K. Morgan	Black Widow writer 2010	Succeeded by Nathan Edmondson
