= Hope Pym =

Fictional character from Marvel Comics

- Hope Pym / Red Queen. Art by Ron Frenz.

Publication information
- Publisher: Marvel Comics
- First appearance: A-Next #7 (April 1999)
- Created by: Tom DeFalco; Ron Frenz

In-story information
- Species: Human
- Team affiliations: Revengers
- Notable aliases: Red Queen
- Abilities: Suit granting: Retractable claws on her gloves; Flight via bio-synthetic wings; Bio-electric energy blasts; Skilled hand-to-hand combatant

Hope Pym is a character appearing in American comic books published by Marvel Comics. Created by Tom DeFalco and Ron Frenz, the character first appeared in A-Next #7 (April 1999). She is the daughter of superheroes Hank Pym and Janet van Dyne in the MC2 universe. Hope Pym is a supervillain known under the codename Red Queen.

Evangeline Lilly portrays a different version of the character, Hope van Dyne, in the Marvel Cinematic Universe (MCU) films Ant-Man (2015), Ant-Man and the Wasp (2018), Avengers: Endgame (2019), and Ant-Man and the Wasp: Quantumania (2023). She dons the mantle of the Wasp, inheriting it from her mother Janet. Alternate versions of the character returned in the animated series What If...? (2021–2024).

== Publication history ==
Hope Pym debuted in A-Next #7 (April 1999), and was created by writer Tom DeFalco and artist Ron Frenz.

== Fictional character biography ==
Hope Pym and her twin brother Big Man (Henry Pym, Jr.) became outraged when people began referring to A-Next as the "next generation" of Avengers after their parents' deaths. Using their parents' fortune, the twins put together the supervillain Revengers team and gained access to the Avengers Mansion via their parents' security codes. When they ambushed A-Next, Hope set about to torture Cassie Lang, feeling that she's the Avengers' rightful heir. Hope was finally stopped when Henry Jr. prevented her from initiating the mansion's self-destruct sequence, which would have killed both A-Next and the Revengers.

The Red Queen was later seen using Silikong, a criminal that was mutated with a crystallized human, and his clones to get revenge on the A-Next, but her plans were thwarted by them and American Dream.

Sometime after the Spider-Verse event, the Red Queen teamed up with Entralla to take control of A-Next using hypnosis and planned to make Stinger execute Ant-Man. Her plans were thwarted by Mayday Parker (now known as Spider-Woman), the New Warriors, and Spider-Man of Earth-3145.

== Powers and abilities ==
Pym utilises a specialized suit of armor with synthetic wings grafted onto her body, alongside bio-electric blasters and extendable claws built into her gloves. She can also shrink in size but can't grow. Screen Rant included the character in their list of the most powerful Wasp variants.

== In other media ==
=== Marvel Cinematic Universe ===
Evangeline Lilly portrays a reimagined version of the character, Hope van Dyne / Wasp, in the Marvel Cinematic Universe (MCU) franchise, with Madeleine McGraw portraying the character as a child in flashbacks. Van Dyne has appeared in the live-action films Ant-Man (2015), Ant-Man and the Wasp (2018), Avengers: Endgame (2019), and Ant-Man and the Wasp: Quantumania (2023). Additionally, alternate versions of the character appear in the Disney+ animated series What If...? (2021–2024) voiced by both Lilly and McGraw.
