= Scott Lang (Marvel Cinematic Universe) =

Character in the Marvel Cinematic Universe

- Marvel Cinematic Universe character
- Paul Rudd as Scott Lang in Ant-Man and the Wasp (2018)
- First appearance: Ant-Man (2015)
- Based on: Ant-Man by: David Michelinie; Bob Layton; John Byrne
- Adapted by: Edgar Wright; Joe Cornish; Adam McKay; Paul Rudd
- Portrayed by: Paul Rudd; Jackson Dunn (young); Lee Moore (old); Bazlo LeClair (baby); Loen LeClair (baby)

In-universe information
- Full name: Scott Edward Harris Lang
- Alias: Ant-Man
- Occupation: Avenger; Electrical engineer; Thief; Baskin-Robbins server; Author; Podcast host
- Affiliation: Avengers; X-Con Security Consultants; Baskin-Robbins; VistaCorp
- Weapon: Ant-Man suit
- Spouse: Maggie Lang (ex-wife)
- Significant other: Hope van Dyne
- Children: Cassie Lang (daughter)
- Origin: San Francisco, California, United States
- Nationality: American

Scott Edward Harris Lang is a fictional character portrayed by Paul Rudd in the Marvel Cinematic Universe (MCU) media franchise, based on the Marvel Comics character of the same name. Depicted as a thief-turned-superhero, Scott is recruited by Hank Pym to use an advanced suit that allows him to change sizes and communicate with ants, inheriting the superhero identity Ant-Man.

Scott is recruited by Sam Wilson to join the Avengers; works alongside Pym's daughter, Hope van Dyne; and rekindles his relationship with his daughter, Cassie Lang. After the Blip, Scott is trapped inside the Quantum Realm before being accidentally saved, then helps the Avengers to stop an alternate version of Thanos. Afterwards, Scott writes a memoir. He is later trapped in the Quantum Realm once again, where he encounters Kang the Conqueror and prevents him from escaping.

Scott first appeared in the film Ant-Man (2015), then in Captain America: Civil War (2016), Ant-Man and the Wasp (2018), Avengers: Endgame (2019) and Ant-Man and the Wasp: Quantumania (2023). Alternate versions of the character appeared in the Disney+ animated series What If...? (2021–2023) and Marvel Zombies (2025), with Rudd reprising his role.

== Concept, creation and casting ==
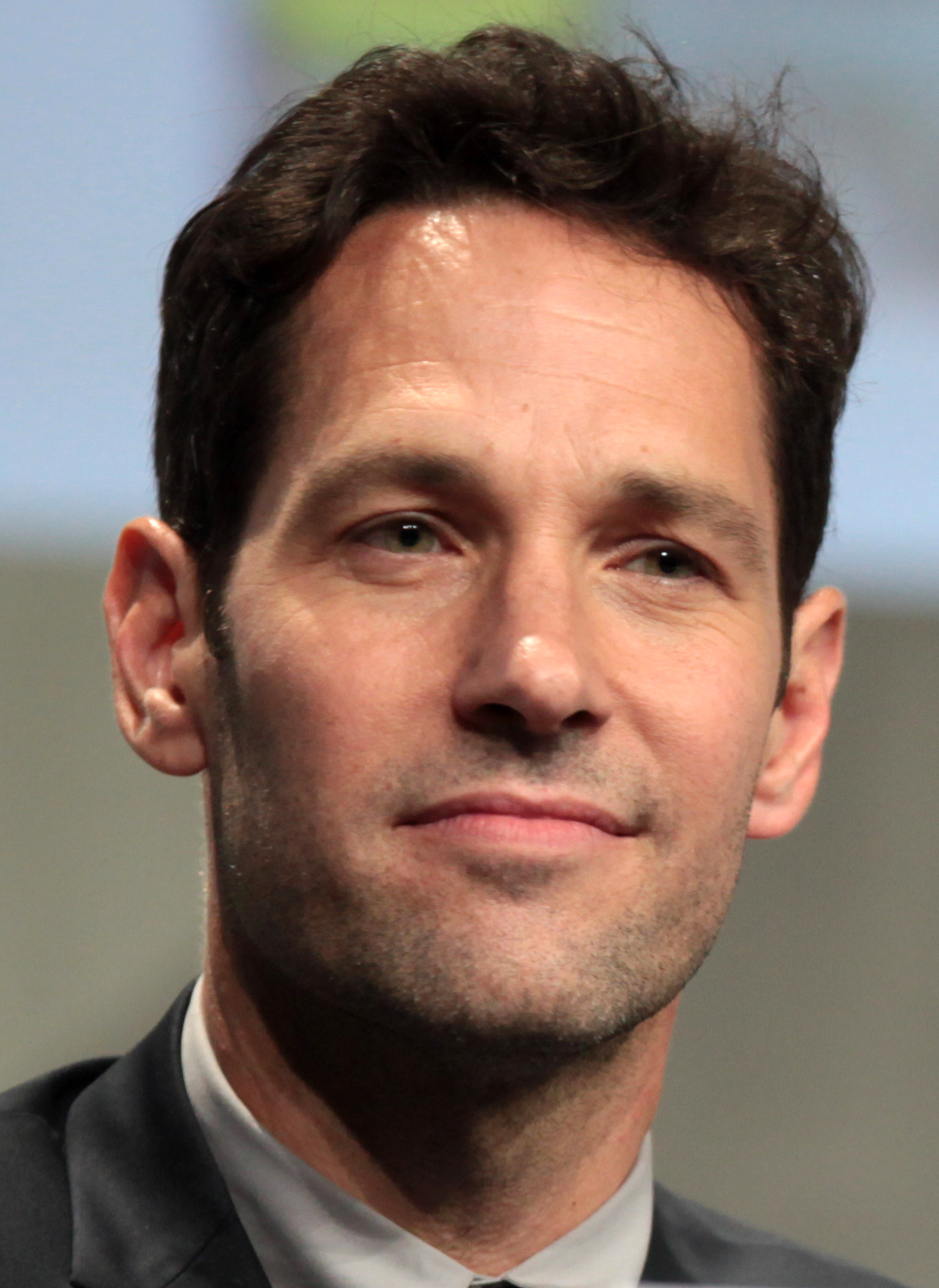
Paul Rudd at 2014 ComicCon, for Ant-Man.

In the mid-2000s, Kevin Feige came to the realization that Marvel Studios still owned the rights to the core members of the Avengers, which included the character Ant-Man. By 2005, Marvel Studios received a $525 million investment from Merrill Lynch, allowing them to independently produce ten films, including one based on the Ant-Man character, set to be directed by Edgar Wright. In 2013, multiple actors were considered for the film's lead role including Paul Rudd, who was eyed to be portraying Hank Pym. By January 2014, Rudd was confirmed to be starring as Scott Lang.

In May 2014, Wright and Marvel Studios issued a joint statement announcing that Wright had exited the movie due to creative differences. According to Wright, he had been hired as writer-director but became unhappy when Marvel wanted to write a new script, retrospectively stating in 2017 that, he "wanted to make a Marvel movie", but that Marvel was not on board with his creative choices, which caused him to rethink his role. Wright was replaced by Peyton Reed as director, with Adam McKay and Rudd rewriting the screenplay.

Feige praised Rudd's casting, noting that he would be able to "do slightly unsavory things like break into people's houses and still be charming and [someone] who you root for and whose redemption you will find satisfaction in". Reed also compared Scott to Danny Ocean (portrayed by George Clooney in Ocean's Eleven), saying, "He's a guy trying to create a new life for himself and find redemption". Rudd went on to sign a multi-film contract with Marvel, with Feige stating it was "three [films]-plus-plus to appear in other things".

== Characterization ==
=== Depictions and appearances ===
Scott first appeared as the character in Marvel Cinematic Universe (MCU) film Ant-Man (2015). The film depicts Scott as petty criminal who becomes the successor to Hank Pym as Ant-Man, when Pym allows him to "steal" his old suit that allows him to shrink in size but increase in strength. Scott works with Pym and his daughter, Hope van Dyne to take back Pym's company, Pym Technologies, from Darren Cross. To get in shape for the role, Rudd worked with various trainers and cut alcohol, fried foods, and carbohydrates out of his diet. He stated that he "basically didn't eat anything for about a year", comparing his route to that of Chris Pratt.

Scott next appeared in Captain America: Civil War (2016) which saw him being recruited by Sam Wilson to fight alongside Steve Rogers in the Avengers Civil War against Tony Stark's faction of the Avengers, and the Sokovia Accords. Peyton Reed had discussed the character with the Russo Brothers, the film's directors, and stated that Scott's appearance was important for continuity purposes. During the airport battle, Scott reveals that his suit can grow rather than solely shrink, with Feige noting that "it was just a great idea to turn the tide of the battle in a huge, shocking, unexpected way". Anthony Russo added that the transformation was the continuation of Scott's character arc from Ant-Man, opining that Scott is "really impressed with Captain America, he just wants to deliver and he figures out a way to deliver where he might actually tear himself in half but he's willing to do it and it works". Additionally, in the film, Rudd's suit "is streamlined and more high-tech" than the one seen in the previous film.

Scott appeared in Ant-Man and the Wasp (2018). In April 2017, Peyton Reed noted that Scott would don his Giant Man moniker once again for the film. Following the events at the end of Captain America: Civil War, Scott escapes from the superhuman prison, the Raft, and is now "a bigger fugitive" from the first film, and is on house arrest. During the film, Scott teams up with Van Dyne, who has now taken her mother's (Janet van Dyne) superhero identity, the Wasp, to help her father rescue her mother from the Quantum Realm. After rescuing Janet and completing his house arrest, during a post-credits scene, Scott is trapped in the Quantum Realm after Janet, Pym and Van Dyne disappear due to The Blip.

Rudd reprised his role in Avengers: Endgame. In a key scene in the film, in which attempts to send Scott through time instead drastically change his age, Scott is portrayed by twins Bazlo and Loen LeClair as a baby, by Jackson A. Dunn at age 12, and by Lee Moore at age 93. This was Moore's final film before his death in August 2018. Markus and McFeely explained that adding Scott helped with implementing time travel into the film, saying, "we had access to him in the second movie, and the fact that he was bringing a whole subset of technology that did have something to do with a different concept of time was like a birthday present".

Scott reprised his role in Ant-Man and the Wasp: Quantumania (2023).

Alternate versions of Scott appeared in season one and two of What If...? (2021–2023), voiced by Rudd. Another alternate version of Scott as Giant-Man appeared in Deadpool & Wolverine (2024) as a large dead skeletal corpse, which was ultimately used by Cassandra Nova as her headquarters. Deadpool makes a meta-reference to Rudd's age upon seeing the corpse.

== Fictional character biography ==
=== Early life ===
Scott graduated from MIT with a degree in engineering, but turned to a life of crime to punish a corporation that had swindled its customers. While in prison, his wife Maggie divorced him and took custody of their daughter, Cassie. (Note: As depicted in Ant-Man (2015).)

=== Becoming Ant-Man ===
In 2015, Scott is released on parole and moves in with his former cellmate, Luis. He visits Cassie unannounced, and is chastised by Maggie and her fiancé, police detective Jim Paxton, for not providing child support. Unable to hold down a job because of his criminal record, Scott agrees to join Luis and his crew, Dave and Kurt, in a burglary. Following a tip, Scott breaks into a house and cracks its safe, only to discover and steal an old motorcycle-looking suit. When he tries it on, he shrinks to the size of an insect. He returns the suit to the house out of fear, but is arrested and subsequently broken out of jail by the homeowner, Hank Pym.

Hank reveals that he had previously operated as the S.H.I.E.L.D. agent codenamed Ant-Man, and had manipulated Scott into stealing the suit as a test. He reveals that he wants Scott to steal another suit from his former protégé, Darren Cross, who has reverse-engineered Hank's technology. Hank and his daughter Hope van Dyne train Scott to fight, use the Ant-Man suit, and to control ants. Hank reveals that Hope's mother, Janet van Dyne, disappeared into the subatomic Quantum Realm while disabling a Soviet nuclear missile over 30 years prior. Hank warns Scott that he could suffer a similar fate if he overrides his suit's regulator.

Scott is sent to steal a device from the Avengers Compound in New York, where he encounters and briefly fights Sam Wilson. Scott, with the help of Luis, Dave and Kurt, infiltrate the Pym Technologies' headquarters as Cross hosts a ceremony at the building to unveil his perfected "Yellowjacket" suit. Scott and Hope stop Hydra agents at the event and detonate the building. Cross later dons the Yellowjacket suit and takes Cassie hostage in her house to lure Scott into a fight. Scott overrides the regulator and shrinks to subatomic size to penetrate Cross' suit and seemingly defeat him. Scott disappears into the Quantum Realm, but manages to reverse the effects and returns. Out of gratitude for saving Cassie, Paxton covers for Scott to keep him out of prison; Scott rekindles a relationship with his family. He is later told by Luis that Wilson is looking for him.

=== Avengers Civil War ===
In 2016, Scott is recruited by Wilson to help Steve Rogers, who has gone rogue in the wake of the implementation of the Sokovia Accords to save his friend Bucky Barnes. He is picked up by Clint Barton and Wanda Maximoff and is taken to Leipzig/Halle Airport in Germany. Before they can leave to stop Helmut Zemo, they are confronted by Tony Stark, Natasha Romanoff, James Rhodes, T'Challa, Peter Parker, and Vision. During the fight, Scott uses his suit to grow to an enormous size, allowing Rogers and Barnes to escape in a Quinjet. Scott is taken down by Parker, Stark, and Rhodes, and is later imprisoned by Thaddeus Ross in the Raft, a superhuman prison. He and the others are later freed by Rogers and Romanoff. Scott, alongside Barton, negotiate a deal with Ross and the U.S. government, receiving a term of house arrest. (Note: As mentioned in Avengers: Infinity War (2018).)

=== Working with the Wasp ===
By 2018, Scott has lost contact with Hank and Hope. Still on house arrest, he is monitored by FBI agent Jimmy Woo. However, he learns that he has unknowingly become entangled with Janet van Dyne after he receives an apparent message from her from the Quantum Realm. Scott contacts Hank about Janet, who sends Hope to kidnap Scott, leaving a decoy so as not to arouse suspicion from Woo. Hank and Hope (who reveals that she is upset Scott did not ask her to help him in the Civil War) recruit Scott to help build a Quantum tunnel to retrieve Janet. Hope uses her own Wasp suit to fight black market dealer Sonny Burch (who has a part of the tunnel they need), before being attacked by a quantumly unstable masked woman. Scott helps Hope fight her off, but she escapes with Hank's shrinkable lab. Hank's estranged former-S.H.I.E.L.D. partner, Bill Foster, helps them locate the lab, where the woman captures the trio and reveals herself to be former S.H.I.E.L.D. assassin, Ava Starr, codenamed "Ghost". Her father Elihas, another of Hank's former partners, died along with his wife during an experiment that caused Starr's unstable state.

Foster, revealed to be working with Starr, tells them that Starr is now dying from her condition, and that they plan to cure her using Janet's quantum energy. Believing that this will kill Janet, Hank refuses to help and escapes with Hope, Scott, and the lab. Opening a stable version of the tunnel, Hank, Hope, and Scott are able to contact Janet, who gives them her precise location, but warns that they only have one chance before the realms separate. Scott accidentally tells Luis where the lab is situated, causing Luis to be interrogated by Burch, who is also looking for the lab. Luis tells him, and inadvertently also tells Ghost who overhears. Scott returns home, but Hank and Hope are arrested by the FBI while Ghost steals the lab. After a pep talk with Cassie, Scott breaks Hank and Hope out of custody and they recover the lab with Luis' help. After an ensuring fight between Scott and Hope against Ghost and Burch, Hank rescues Janet safely from the Quantum Realm, and Janet voluntarily gifts some of her energy to Starr to temporarily stabilize her. Scott returns home once more, in time for a now suspicious Woo to release him from house arrest.

Sometime after, using a smaller quantum tunnel built in Luis' van, Hank, Janet, Hope and Scott plan to harvest quantum energy particles to help Starr remain stable. Scott returns to the Quantum Realm for the harvest, but as he is about to be brought out, Hank, Janet and Hope fall victim to the Blip, trapping Scott.

=== Time Heist ===
In 2023, Scott is released from the Quantum Realm after a rat inadvertently activates the quantum tunnel and he finds himself and the van in a storage warehouse. After learning of the Blip, Scott is relieved when he learns Cassie survived, returning to her house and reuniting with her, now five years older.

Scott later drives to the Avengers Compound where he explains to Rogers and Romanoff that he experienced only five hours within the Quantum Realm, theorizing that Hank's Quantum technology could serve as a means of time travel. The trio visit Stark at his house to explain their plan for a "Time Heist" to retrieve the Infinity Stones from the past and use them to undo the Blip; Stark refuses at first. They then meet with Bruce Banner at a diner and he agrees to help them, however, his initial attempts at time travel are unsuccessful, and Scott is turned from a baby into child and an elderly man. Stark later arrives to assist; he is successful in creating a device to time travel.

Scott and the others, along with Thor, Rocket Raccoon, Nebula, Rhodes, and Barton formulate a plan to send them all back in time. Scott travels with Banner, Rogers and Stark to an alternate 2012 during the Battle of New York. Scott attempts to steal the Space Stone from an alternate Stark, but it is later lost to an alternate Loki. Scott takes the Mind Stone back to the present while Rogers and Stark travel to an alternate 1970 to retrieve both the other stone and additional Pym Particles.

Once everyone returned, Banner successfully restores the victims of the Blip, but an alternate Thanos from 2014 arrives and attacks the Avengers Compound. Scott, along with a revived Hope, joins the Avengers in a battle. Scott later attends Stark's funeral with Hope, Hank and Janet, and then returns home to spend time with Hope and Cassie.

=== Encounter with Kang ===
By 2026, Scott writes a memoir titled Look Out for the Little Guy. During a family dinner with Hank, Janet, Hope, and Cassie, the latter reveals that she has been working on building a quantum satellite. Despite Janet's protests, upon opening the device, the family are separated and sucked into the Quantum Realm. Scott and Cassie encounter various species of beings, and learn that someone is looking for him due to his association with Janet. Both Scott and Cassie are captured by a surviving Darren, now cybernetically enhanced and referred to as M.O.D.O.K. After being imprisoned, they are approached by Kang the Conqueror who reveals to Scott that he needs to reclaim a Multiversal Power Core to power his ship, allowing him to escape the Quantum Realm. Scott initially refuses to help him, but makes a deal in order to spare Cassie's life.

While Scott attempts to retrieve the Power Core which is trapped inside a probability storm, Scott meets other variants of himself who help him to retrieve the Power Core. With the help of the variants and Hope who flies in to save Scott, they shrink the Core down. Kang forcefully takes the Core from Scott, doesn't give Cassie back breaking their deal, kidnaps Janet, and begins to make his escape. Scott teams up with Hope, Hank, and an army of futuristic ants to fight Kang and his army and creates a portal back to their reality. Before Scott can make it through he is confronted by Kang who overpowers Scott and nearly kills him. Hope comes back to save Scott, and knocks Kang into the Power Core, seemingly killing him. Cassie reopens the portal on her end for Scott and Hope to return home, and the family happily resumes their life. Despite this, Scott questions if Kang is really dead or if he may have accidentally caused something worse to happen.

== Alternate versions ==
Several alternate versions of Scott appear in the MCU multiverse, including the animated series What If...?, with Rudd reprising his role.

=== Zombie outbreak ===
In an alternate 2018, following Janet van Dyne and Hank Pym's return from the Quantum Realm, Scott is attacked and turned into a zombie by the pair who have been infected with a zombie quantum virus. Later, Vision finds the zombified Scott and takes him to Camp Lehigh where he cures him with the Mind Stone; however, Vision is only able to preserve Scott's head in a jar. When a group of survivors, including Scott's friend Kurt, arrive at the camp, Scott is aided by the Cloak of Levitation and escapes with Peter Parker and T'Challa to Wakanda. However, they discover that all of Wakanda has been infected by a zombie Thanos, until they receive help from Thor, Rocket, and Groot, but they were annihilated. After T'Challa's sacrifice, the Infinity Stones are destroyed, releasing a surge of energy. Lang and Parker are saved by the remaining sorcerers of Kamar-Taj. They welcome Shang-Chi, Katy, Kamala Khan, Blade Knight and Valkyrie by saving them from the fall, and reveal to them that the energy of the Infinity Stones is being contained by Hulk, who has become "Infinity Hulk". Arriving to help defend the Hulk, Lang and the remaining heroes fall one by one.

=== 1602 Avengers ===
In an alternate 1602, Scott, Bucky Barnes, and Rogers Hood worked together and acted as a Merry Men-type group. After stopping a carriage carrying Loki, they were met by Captain Peggy Carter. Scott accompanied them to a pub, however, it was attacked by Sir Harold "Happy" Hogan, the Royal Yellowjackets, and the Destroyer who were in search for Carter. Scott was annoyed that the Royal Yellowjackets stole his shrinking techniques. After escaping, Scott, Rogers, and Barnes met with Carter, Tony Stark, and Bruce Banner about a plan in saving the universe from an incursion. Scott, Barnes, Rogers, and Carter disguised themselves and infiltrated King Thor's court palace. Once Stark arrived with his device and Carter had grabbed the Scepter carrying the Time Stone, they learned that Rogers was the cause of the incursion. Carter used the Stone to send him back which also caused Scott and the others to return to their respective universes.

=== Void ===
In another universe, Scott Lang was pruned by the Time Variance Authority and sent to the Void at the End of Time where he died while in his giant form. His skeletal remains were used by Cassandra Nova and her forces as a base.

== Reception ==
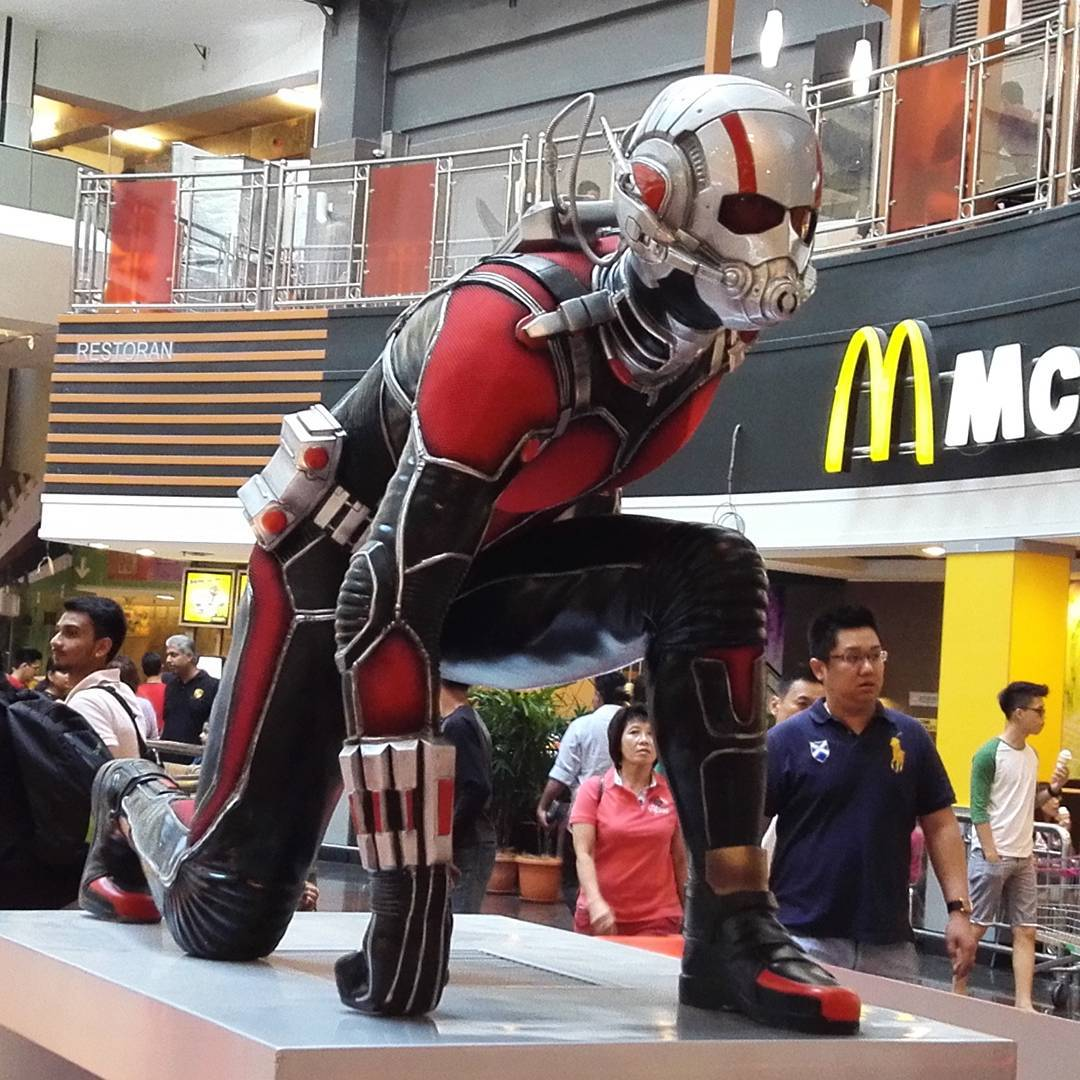
A display of a model of the Ant-Man suit at a McDonald's restaurant.

The consensus of review aggregator website Rotten Tomatoes reads, "Led by a charming performance from Paul Rudd, Ant-Man offers Marvel thrills on an appropriately smaller scale – albeit not as smoothly as its most successful predecessors." Todd McCarthy of The Hollywood Reporter remarked, "Although the story dynamics are fundamentally silly and the family stuff, with its parallel father-daughter melodrama, is elemental button-pushing, a good cast led by a winning Paul Rudd puts the nonsense over in reasonably disarming fashion."

For Ant-Man and the Wasp, the critical consensus on Rotten Tomatoes reads, "A lighter, brighter superhero movie powered by the effortless charisma of Paul Rudd and Evangeline Lilly, Ant-Man and The Wasp offers a much-needed MCU palate cleanser." Simon Abrams of RogerEbert.com felt that the film managed to juggle its many subplots while giving Rudd's Scott some decent character development. Peter Travers, writing for Rolling Stone, gave the film 3 out of 4 stars and praised Rudd and Lilly, as did Manohla Dargis at The New York Times, who praised Rudd, and felt Lilly found "her groove" in the film, while Stephanie Zachareck, writing for Time, thought the film had reasonably fun action and stand-out moments between Rudd and Abby Ryder Fortson as daughter Cassie, but felt the focus on Lilly as a better hero than Rudd was "just checking off boxes in the name of gender equality."

Richard Roeper of the Chicago Sun-Times also praised the cast, especially Rudd and Fortson, while Ann Hornaday of The Washington Post called the film "instantly forgettable" and criticized its plot, but still found the film enjoyable, particularly praising Rudd along with the action and effects.

=== Accolades ===
| Year | Film | Award | Category | Result | Ref. |
|---|---|---|---|---|---|
| 2015 | Ant-Man | Teen Choice Awards | Choice Summer Movie Star: Male | Nominated | |
| 2016 | Ant-Man | Critics' Choice Awards | Best Actor in an Action Movie | Nominated | |
| 2016 | Ant-Man | Saturn Awards | Best Actor | Nominated | |
| 2016 | Ant-Man | MTV Movie Awards | Best Hero | Nominated | |
| 2019 | Ant-Man and the Wasp | Teen Choice Awards | Choice Action Movie Actor | Nominated | |
| 2019 | Avengers: Endgame | Teen Choice Awards | Choice Action Movie Actor | Nominated | |
| 2023 | Ant-Man and the Wasp: Quantumania | MTV Movie & TV Awards | Best Hero | Nominated | |

== In other media ==
=== Theme parks ===
Scott Lang / Ant-Man appears in Ant-Man and The Wasp: Nano Battle! at Hong Kong Disneyland and in the preshow of Avengers Assemble: Flight Force at Walt Disney Studios Park. Rudd reprises the role for the character's appearance in Nano Battle!.

== See also ==
- Characters of the Marvel Cinematic Universe
