= Ant-Man and the Wasp: Quantumania =

2023 Marvel Studios film

- Theatrical release poster
- Directed by: Peyton Reed
- Written by: Jeff Loveness
- Based on: Marvel Comics
- Produced by: Kevin Feige; Stephen Broussard
- Starring: Paul Rudd; Evangeline Lilly; Jonathan Majors; Kathryn Newton; David Dastmalchian; Katy O'Brian; William Jackson Harper; Bill Murray; Michelle Pfeiffer; Corey Stoll; Michael Douglas
- Cinematography: Bill Pope
- Edited by: Adam Gerstel; Laura Jennings
- Music by: Christophe Beck
- Production company: Marvel Studios
- Distributed by: Walt Disney Studios Motion Pictures
- Release dates: February 6, 2023 (Regency Village Theatre); February 17, 2023 (United States)
- Running time: 124 minutes
- Country: United States
- Language: English
- Budget: $388.4 million (gross); $330.1 million (net)
- Box office: $476.1 million

Ant-Man and the Wasp: Quantumania is a 2023 American superhero film based on Marvel Comics featuring the characters Scott Lang / Ant-Man and Hope Pym / Wasp. Produced by Marvel Studios and distributed by Walt Disney Studios Motion Pictures, it is the sequel to Ant-Man (2015) and Ant-Man and the Wasp (2018), and the 31st film in the Marvel Cinematic Universe (MCU). It was directed by Peyton Reed, written by Jeff Loveness, and stars Paul Rudd as Scott Lang and Evangeline Lilly as Hope van Dyne, alongside Jonathan Majors, Kathryn Newton, David Dastmalchian, Katy O'Brian, William Jackson Harper, Bill Murray, Michelle Pfeiffer, Corey Stoll, and Michael Douglas. In the film, Scott, Hope, and their family are accidentally transported to the Quantum Realm and face off against Kang the Conqueror (Majors).

Plans for a third Ant-Man film were confirmed in November 2019, with Reed and Rudd returning. Loveness was hired by April 2020, with development beginning during the COVID-19 pandemic. The title and new cast members, including the additions of Majors and Newton, were announced in December 2020. Filming in Turkey began in early February 2021, and additional filming occurred in San Francisco in mid-June. Principal photography began at the end of July at Pinewood Studios in Buckinghamshire and ended in November. With a net production budget of $330.1 million, it is one of the most expensive films ever made.

Ant-Man and the Wasp: Quantumania premiered in Westwood, Los Angeles, on February 6, 2023, and was released in the United States on February 17. It is the first film, and beginning, of Phase Five of the MCU. The film received mixed reviews from critics and was a box-office disappointment, grossing $476.1 million worldwide and becoming one of the few MCU films to not break-even in its theatrical run.

== Plot ==
Following the Avengers's battle against Thanos, (Note: As depicted in Avengers: Endgame (2019)) Scott Lang has become a successful memoirist and has been living happily with his girlfriend, Hope van Dyne. Scott's now-teenage daughter Cassie has become an activist, helping people displaced by the Blip, resulting in her having a strained relationship with her father. While visiting Hope's parents, Hank Pym and Janet van Dyne, Cassie reveals that she has been working on a device that can establish contact with the Quantum Realm. Upon learning of this, Janet panics and forcefully shuts off the device, but the message is received, resulting in a portal that opens and sucks the five of them, and a number of Hank's lab ants, into the Quantum Realm. Scott and Cassie are found by natives who are rebelling against their ruler, while Hope, Janet, and Hank explore a sprawling city to get answers.

Hope, Janet, and Hank meet with Lord Krylar, a former ally of Janet's, who reveals that things have changed since she left, (Note: As depicted in Ant-Man and the Wasp (2018)) and that he is now working for Kang, the Quantum Realm's new ruler. The three are forced to flee and steal Krylar's ship. The Langs, meanwhile, are told by rebel leader Jentorra that Janet's involvement with Kang is indirectly responsible for his rise to power. The rebels soon come under attack by Kang's forces led by M.O.D.O.K., who is revealed to be Darren Cross, having survived his apparent death at the hands of Scott, (Note: As depicted in Ant-Man (2015)) and who previously received Cassie's message. Aboard Krylar's ship, Janet confesses to Hope and Hank that she met Kang when she was previously in the Quantum Realm. He claimed that he and Janet could both escape from the Quantum Realm if she helped him rebuild his multiversal power core. After they managed to repair it, Janet saw a vision of Kang conquering and destroying entire timelines. Kang revealed he was exiled by his variants out of fear, which drove Janet to turn against him. Outmatched, Janet used her Pym Particles to enlarge the power core beyond use. Kang, having regained his powers, eventually conquered the Quantum Realm afterward.

The Langs are taken to Kang, who demands that Scott help get his power core back or else he will kill Cassie. Scott is then taken to the core's location and shrinks down. In the core, he encounters a probability storm, which causes him to split into multiple copies of himself, nearly overwhelming him, but Hope arrives and helps him acquire the power core. However, Kang reneges on the deal, capturing Janet with M.O.D.O.K. destroying her ship with Hank on it. After being rescued by his ants, who rapidly evolved and became hyper-intelligent in the Quantum Realm, Hank helps Scott and Hope as they make their way to Kang. Cassie rescues Jentorra and they commence an uprising against Kang and his army. During the fight, Cassie convinces Cross to switch sides and fight Kang, with him eventually sacrificing his life.

Janet fixes the power core as she, Hank, Hope, and Cassie jump through a portal home. Kang attacks Scott at the last minute. Before he can beat Scott into submission, Hope returns, and she and Scott throw Kang and the Pym Particles into the power core, destroying them both. Cassie reopens the portal for Scott and Hope to return home. As Scott happily resumes his life, he begins to rethink what he was told about Kang's death being the start of something terrible happening, but brushes it off. In a mid-credits scene, numerous variants of Kang, led by Immortus, commiserate Kang's death and plan their multiversal uprising. In a post-credits scene, Loki and Mobius M. Mobius encounter another Kang variant, Victor Timely, at the Chicago World's Fair in 1893. (Note: As depicted in the Loki season 2 episode "1893" (2023))

== Cast ==
- Paul Rudd as Scott Lang / Ant-Man:
  An Avenger and former petty criminal with a suit that allows him to shrink or grow in scale while increasing in strength. After the events of Avengers: Endgame (2019), Scott has become a well-known celebrity to the public, as well as the author of an autobiographical book titled Look Out for the Little Guy, which tells a different version of how he helped save the universe from Thanos in Endgame.
- Evangeline Lilly as Hope van Dyne / Wasp:
  The daughter of Hank Pym and Janet van Dyne who is handed down a similar suit and the Wasp mantle from her mother. She serves as the head of the Pym van Dyne Foundation, which uses the Pym Particles for humanitarian efforts. Lilly said the film would explore how the character deals with her "fragilities and her vulnerabilities", continuing from how Ant-Man and the Wasp (2018) showed how powerful and capable she was.
- Jonathan Majors as Kang the Conqueror:
  A "time-traveling, multiversal adversary" trapped in the Quantum Realm who needs Pym Particles to get his ship and a device online that would allow him to go anywhere and when in time. Kang is an alternate-timeline variant of the character He Who Remains, the creator of the Time Variance Authority (TVA), who was introduced in the finale of first season of Loki (2021). Kang was described by Loki season one head writer Michael Waldron as the "next big cross-movie villain" for the MCU, while Quantumania writer Jeff Loveness described Kang as a "top-tier, A-list Avengers villain". Majors said Kang is different from He Who Remains, who is not in Quantumania, with a shifted psychology, portraying Kang differently from He Who Remains due to the different characters surrounding him and transitioning from a series to a film. He was attracted to Kang's "character and dimensions" and the potential that presented to him as an actor, noting Kang would be a different type of villain to the MCU than Erik Killmonger and Thanos were, as well as the possibility of playing a complex villain about whom everyone has to be careful, akin to Iago in William Shakespeare's tragedy Othello. Loveness wanted to focus on Kang as a human being by exploring his humanity and vulnerability as a "very lonely" character before he reaches "apocalyptic, Avengers-scale heights". He contrasted this to Thanos by not creating him entirely from computer-generated imagery, and said Kang would be "Thanos on an exponential level". He also said that because the concept of time travel had already been explored in Endgame, he had to broaden his approach to Kang to focus more on the multiverse, his dimensionality, and his "limitless freedom" from his time, and how different versions of the character would destroy it and make it their own. Loveness researched the different versions of Kang from the comics such as Rama-Tut and the Scarlet Centurion and described him as an "infinite snake eating infinite tails" in being "a man literally at war against himself". Director Peyton Reed likened the character to Alexander the Great as a reference point for Majors, who also found inspiration in Genghis Khan and Julius Caesar. Majors said that Kang would be the "supervillain of supervillains" and looked to contrast Tony Stark / Iron Man, who he called the "superhero of superheroes". Majors added 10 pounds (4.5 kg) of muscle for the role, focusing on strength and conditioning training. Reed said Quantumania would show a "different flavor" of Majors's approach to Kang's alternate versions and explained that Kang "has dominion over time", calling him a warrior, strategist, and "all-timer antagonist" compared to the antagonists of the prior Ant-Man films as a "force of nature", one that adds "tonal diversity, real conflict and real friction". Given his work with time, Kang does not live a linear life.
  - Majors also portrays numerous Kang variants within the Council of Kangs including Immortus, Rama-Tut, and Centurion in the mid-credits scene, as well as the variant Victor Timely in the post-credits scene.
- Kathryn Newton as Cassie Lang:
  Scott Lang's 18-year-old daughter who acquires a suit similar to her father's. She is scientifically inclined, and gains an interest in Pym's old notes and learning more about the science and technology from the Quantum Realm. Reed said that he wanted to further develop the relationship between Cassie and Scott, as it was central to the previous Ant-Man films. The character was previously portrayed as a child by Abby Ryder Fortson in the previous Ant-Man films and as a teenager by Emma Fuhrmann in Endgame.
- David Dastmalchian as Veb: A slime-like creature that lives in the Quantum Realm whose ooze can make anyone understand Quantum Realm language. Dastmalchian previously portrayed Kurt in the first two Ant-Man films.
- Katy O'Brian as Jentorra:
  The humanoid leader of the Freedom Fighters rebelling against Kang's oppression of the communities in the Quantum Realm. O'Brian auditioned for the role, despite previously working with Reed on the Star Wars series The Mandalorian, and originally believed she was auditioning for The Marvels (2023). Despite the character appearing in the comics, O'Brian was encouraged to create the character as she chose. O'Brian previously appeared as Kimball in the Marvel Television series Agents of S.H.I.E.L.D.
- William Jackson Harper as Quaz: A humanoid telepath who lives in the Quantum Realm.
- Bill Murray as Lord Krylar:
  The humanoid governor of the lavish Axia community in the Quantum Realm, who has a history with Janet van Dyne in the Quantum Realm. Reed believed Murray's character represented a person's past "always find[ing] a way to show up again" and the film's theme of secrets between family members and how they are each affected by them.
- Michelle Pfeiffer as Janet Van Dyne / Wasp: Pym's wife, Hope's mother, and the original Wasp, who was lost in the Quantum Realm for 30 years.
- Corey Stoll as Darren Cross / M.O.D.O.K.:
  Pym's former protégé who was shrunken to subatomic size in the Quantum Realm during the events of Ant-Man (2015) and became a mutated, cybernetically enhanced individual with an oversized head known as M.O.D.O.K. Loveness described the character as a cross between Kevin Kline's Otto West from A Fish Called Wanda (1988) and Frank Grimes from The Simpsons season eight episode "Homer's Enemy" (1997). Loveness felt M.O.D.O.K. to be his favorite character in the film because they put a "little extra" on him, and said M.O.D.O.K.'s ego would be crumbled throughout the film whenever he is challenged, but like Otto West, easily kills as a "real loose cannon".
- Michael Douglas as Dr. Hank Pym / Ant-Man:
  A former S.H.I.E.L.D. agent, entomologist, and physicist who became the original Ant-Man after creating the suit. In the film, Pym was written to be more "relaxed" than in previous MCU appearances, as he is more focused on reacquainting with Janet than his work. As a result, Broussard described Pym as "a little more sure of himself" and "not looking around every corner". Loveness believed that Pym's fascination with ants, a trait only comically referenced previously, was a critical hallmark of the character, and thus decided to expand on it in the film. Broussard felt the expansion was "a weird thing ... but also awesome ... a bit of an acknowledgment of ... a weird obsession for this guy who's totally owned it."

Additionally, Randall Park briefly reprises his role as FBI agent Jimmy Woo from previous MCU media, along with Gregg Turkington as Baskin-Robbins store manager Dale from Ant-Man. Ruben Rabasa appears as a coffee shop attendant who mistakes Ant-Man for Spider-Man. A man asking Scott for a picture with his dog is played by Mark Oliver Everett, frontman of the rock band Eels, whose father was quantum physicist Hugh Everett III and the originator of the many-worlds interpretation of quantum theory. Roger Craig Smith and Matthew Wood voice the Quantumnauts, the foot soldiers of Kang, while Jamie Andrew Cutler portrays Xolum, a robot member of the Freedom Fighters. The film's post-credits scene features uncredited cameo appearances by Tom Hiddleston and Owen Wilson, reprising their respective roles as Loki and Mobius M. Mobius from Loki.

== Production ==
=== Development ===
Ahead of the release of Ant-Man and the Wasp (2018), director Peyton Reed said there were elements of that film that leave "a lot to play with" in a potential third film in the franchise. He highlighted the Quantum Realm, which was introduced in Ant-Man (2015) and explored further in Ant-Man and the Wasp; Reed said they were "just dipping our toes into it" for the previous films. Reed added that he and Marvel Studios were hopeful about a third film and had discussed potential story points for such a sequel. In February 2019, Hank Pym actor Michael Douglas confirmed that informal discussions regarding a sequel to Ant-Man and the Wasp had taken place, though by that time Evangeline Lilly had not heard of any plans for her character Hope van Dyne / Wasp following her role in Avengers: Endgame (2019). Lilly stated that "Hope is mid-journey. I don't see her journey as being over by any stretch." That October, Michelle Pfeiffer expressed interest in reprising her role of Janet van Dyne in a sequel, while Marvel Studios president Kevin Feige was asked about the future of Paul Rudd's Scott Lang / Ant-Man in the Marvel Cinematic Universe (MCU) following Endgame, and responded that "the chess pieces were arranged very purposefully" at the end of that film, with some taken "off the board" and others, like Ant-Man, "still on [the board, so] you never know". Rudd was asked whether he would be returning to the role, either in a third Ant-Man film or as part of another hero's MCU franchise, and said that both of those options had been discussed.

Reed officially signed on to direct a third Ant-Man film at the start of November 2019. Rudd was set to star as Lang, with Lilly and Douglas also returning. Filming was scheduled to begin in January 2021 with a likely release date in 2022. Reed was hired again, despite Marvel's interest in new filmmakers bringing different takes to their heroes for each film, because executives felt he had "a real grasp on the Ant-Man universe and want[ed] to see him return to wrap up his trilogy". Jeff Loveness was hired to write the script for the film during "the early days of Hollywood's shutdown" due to the COVID-19 pandemic, and he had begun working on the screenplay by April 2020. At that point, it was no longer clear when production would begin on the film due to the effects of the pandemic on all film productions. Chris McKenna, Eric Pearson, Rudd, and Erik Sommers received credit for additional off-screen literary material. In August 2020, Reed confirmed that development on the film was continuing during the pandemic. He said that Lilly would continue to get equal billing in the film alongside Rudd as she is "a very, very important part" of the partnership between Ant-Man and the Wasp, despite rumors that her role would be reduced following controversial comments about the pandemic. Reed added that the story for the film had been "cracked", though "nothing [was] official yet", and said the third film would be a "bigger, more sprawling movie than the first two [with] a very different visual template". Reed stated they wanted to further explore the Quantum Realm in the film as a "massive world-building undertaking", and compared its design to electron microscope photography, the Heavy Metal magazine issues of the 1970s and 1980s and his favorite science fiction cover artists such as Jean Giraud for fantastical realism. Marvel Studios producer Brian Gay said the film would "feel like a real departure" from the first two Ant-Man films and be a big adventure. Fellow Marvel Studios executive Stephen Broussard produced the film alongside Feige.

=== Pre-production ===
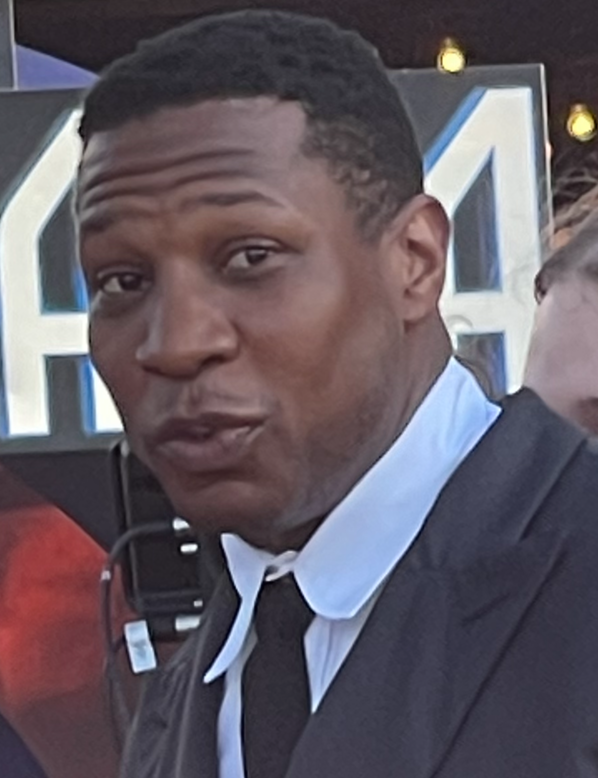
Jonathan Majors was cast as Kang the Conqueror for the film, and the character was subsequently planned as the main antagonist of the Multiverse Saga during production.

Jonathan Majors was cast in September 2020 in a "lead role" for the film, which was reported to be Kang the Conqueror. Because the actor cast as Kang would first portray an alternate version of the character, named He Who Remains, in the Disney+ series Loki, Kate Herron and Michael Waldron—the director and head writer of Loki's first season, respectively—were involved in casting Majors in addition to Reed and executives at Marvel Studios; Marvel Studios were eager to work with and cast Majors after seeing his performance in The Last Black Man in San Francisco (2019), with Reed very supportive of approaching Majors. Majors was approached for the role without an audition, and later noted he had been involved in the film "since the beginning" before joining Loki. Reed was interested in having Ant-Man and the Wasp go up against a formidable foe in the film, believing Kang to be one of Marvel Comics' "all-timers" like Loki and Doctor Doom.

In November 2020, filming was expected to start in 2021. The following month, Pfeiffer confirmed her involvement and that filming would begin in mid-2021, while she and Douglas both indicated that the film would be released in 2022. Later in December at Disney's Investor Day, Feige revealed the film's title as Ant-Man and the Wasp: Quantumania, confirmed the return of Rudd, Lilly, Douglas and Pfeiffer, alongside Majors as Kang, and revealed that Kathryn Newton had joined the film as Cassie Lang. Newton originally auditioned for the role of Kate Bishop in the Disney+ miniseries Hawkeye (2021), before Hailee Steinfeld was cast as the character. Emma Fuhrmann, who played the character as a teenager in Avengers: Endgame, was saddened by the announcement of Newton taking over the role, and hoped to be involved in the MCU in the future. Later that month, Loveness revealed that he had turned in the first draft of the script, and said Marvel had used the COVID-19 pandemic break to "do something new and weird" with the film. Loveness was inspired by several "father and daughter" films starring Steve Martin or Robin Williams from the 1990s, like Father of the Bride, Hook (both 1991) and Jumanji (1995), with Loveness feeling that because he admired all those father characters, he could mix the "underdog dad" hero energy with Rudd's likability to make it a through line for the film. Broussard described the film as a "family adventure" film that becomes "an epic sci-fi war movie and a coming-of-age story".

On February 4, 2021, Turkey's Minister of Culture and Tourism Mehmet Ersoy announced that shooting for the film had begun in the country's region of Cappadocia, with the production also set to film in other parts of Turkey. At the beginning of March, Tip "T.I." Harris was revealed to not be returning as his character Dave from the first two Ant-Man films. This news came after sexual abuse allegations against Harris and his wife Tameka Cottle arose at the end of February, but Variety reported that this was unrelated and Harris was never set to return for the sequel. In early May 2021, Marvel Studios announced that the film would be released on February 17, 2023. In mid-June, Rudd and Douglas headed to England to prepare for filming. Shooting to capture exterior shots and background plates took place at the San Francisco Police Department Central Station in North Beach, San Francisco on June 19 and 20, with filming of the station's interior, the outward view of the building, and downtown San Francisco. In July, Joanna Robinson of Vanity Fair reported that Corey Stoll, who portrayed Darren Cross / Yellowjacket in Ant-Man, would appear in "some shape" for Quantumania. Reed planned to feature comedian Tom Scharpling again in the film, after his cameos in the previous two films were ultimately cut from the theatrical releases; however, the scene in which he would have been featured was cut before it was filmed.

=== Filming ===
Principal photography began on July 26, 2021, at Pinewood Studios in Buckinghamshire, using the working title Dust Bunny, with Bill Pope serving as cinematographer. Industrial Light & Magic provided the same StageCraft virtual production technology Reed used while directing episodes of the Disney+ Star Wars series The Mandalorian. Will Htay served as the production designer. Principal photography was previously set to begin in January 2021 but was postponed due to the COVID-19 pandemic. It was then expected to take place between May 31 and September 24. By September 16, over 50 crew members from Pinewood Studios productions, mainly Quantumania and Indiana Jones and the Dial of Destiny (2023), contracted norovirus following an outbreak at the studio. The main cast was not affected. In October, the film's release was delayed to July 28, 2023. Later that month, Bill Murray revealed he had shot material for a Marvel film with Reed, which was believed to be Quantumania. Murray explained he joined the project as he liked Reed and his work on Bring It On (2000), despite not being interested in superhero films, before he further indicated his involvement in the film, but said he could not comment on his prior statement; Murray later said he was playing a "bad guy" in the film. During the filming process, the screenplay was reportedly still being worked on at the same time, with multiple scenes involving Murray and Katy O'Brian's Jentorra later being scrapped, resulting in Murray's character seemingly dying. Principal photography was completed in November 2021. Filming was also expected to take place in Atlanta, and the production was slated to move to San Francisco in 2022 with the cast.

=== Post-production ===
In April 2022, the film was moved back to its February 17, 2023, release date, swapping places with The Marvels because Quantumania was further along in production than that film. In September 2022, Randall Park was confirmed to be reprising his role as Jimmy Woo, and Feige called the film "a direct line" into Phase Five and the planned Phase Six film Avengers: The Kang Dynasty, with Majors attached to reprise his role in The Kang Dynasty. Reed stated that Quantumania would have a "profound impact" on the MCU and that the impact of Kang's appearance in this film was discussed with Loveness for The Kang Dynasty, which he was also writing. Loveness felt that having Kang as the main villain of Quantumania would set up the dynamic story he was developing for The Kang Dynasty. Marvel Studios was not initially planning to have "The Multiverse Saga", which comprises Phases Four, Five, and Six, revolve around Kang, but decided to after seeing Majors's performance in the first season of Loki and the dailies while filming Quantumania. Reed also hoped the film would not be viewed as a "palate cleanser" the previous two films had been following Avengers films, but would instead feel as big as an Avengers film. Gregg Turkington was also revealed to be reprising his role as Dale, a Baskin-Robbins manager, from Ant-Man. In October 2022, William Jackson Harper was revealed to be appearing in the film in an undisclosed role, and in November, O'Brian was revealed to be appearing in the film alongside David Dastmalchian, who portrayed Kurt in the first two films, after he previously said he was not involved in Quantumania. In January 2023, Dastmalchian, Harper, O'Brian, Murray, and Stoll were revealed to be playing Veb, Quaz, Jentorra, Lord Krylar, and M.O.D.O.K., respectively. Pick-up shots with Rudd occurred by then.

The film's mid-credits scene sees the introduction of the Council of Kangs, particularly Immortus, Rama-Tut, and Centurion. These variants, all portrayed by Majors, discuss how the Conqueror has been killed and that the Avengers are starting to infringe on the multiverse and what they have built. This leads to hundreds of other Kang variants filling an arena, in a shot reminiscent of the council's first appearance in comics in The Avengers #292 (June 1988). The post-credits scene is footage from the Loki season 2 episode "1893" (2023), with Majors appearing as Victor Timely, a Kang variant, and Tom Hiddleston and Owen Wilson reprising their respective Loki roles of Loki and Mobius M. Mobius.

External videos
- Marvel Studios' Ant-Man and The Wasp: Quantumania Main on End Credits Title Sequence presents the film's main-on-end title sequence, YouTube video from Perception's channel

The film's main-on-end title sequence was designed by Perception, which emulated the visuals of the Quantum Realm using fluid motion and microscopic chemical reactions. The visual effects were made by Sony Pictures Imageworks, Industrial Light & Magic, Digital Domain, Moving Picture Company, Fin Design + Effects, Spin VFX, Rising Sun Pictures, Folks VFX, Barnstorm VFX, Base FX, Pixomondo, MARZ, Luma Pictures, Atomic Arts, Territory Studio, and Stereo D, with Jesse James Chisholm as the visual effects supervisor, while Adam Gerstel and Laura Jennings co-edited the film. Due to the shifting release schedule of the film, the post-production period for Quantumania was reduced by four-and-a-half months, which resulted in reportedly at least 10 rushed visual effects scenes being added at the last minute. Several visual effects companies that worked on Quantumania were also in post-production on Black Panther: Wakanda Forever (2022) around the same time, which resulted in "critical resources" being diverted to focus on Wakanda Forever. Disney spent $194.7 million during pre-production and filming and an additional $131.9 million on post-production in 2022 for a total gross production budget of $326.6 million, which was over 63% more than an initially estimated $200 million production budget and exceeded that of Disney's internal projections for the budget. Disney also received a total reimbursement from the UK government of $50.6 million, which reduced the net budget to $276 million.

In March 2023, Marvel Studios filed a request to issue a subpoena to Reddit to identify the person or group who was responsible for leaking the script and subtitle file for the film in January 2023 to the subreddit r/MarvelStudiosSpoilers, as well as a subpoena to Google since the leaked information had been uploaded to Google Docs. As a result of the request, r/MarvelStudiosSpoilers temporarily went private and became unavailable to the public. The subreddit was reopened in July 2023.

== Music ==
Christophe Beck was revealed to be composing the score by July 2022, after previously working on the previous two Ant-Man films, as well as the MCU Disney+ series WandaVision and Hawkeye (both in 2021). The soundtrack album was released digitally by Hollywood Records and Marvel Music on February 15, 2023, with its first track, "Theme from Quantumania", released as a digital single on February 12.

== Marketing ==
The first footage from the film was shown at the 2022 San Diego Comic-Con where Feige, Reed, and the cast promoted the film and discussed the characters. Further footage was shown at D23 in September, which Ryan Leston at IGN called "an intriguing glimpse" into the film. A teaser trailer for the film was released on October 24, 2022. It featured "Goodbye Yellow Brick Road" by Elton John. Tom Chapman at Den of Geek noted the trailer was "darker than ever" compared to the comedic tone of the prior two Ant-Man films and featured "dramatic pauses and tense musical cues", but felt it was "another MCU teaser trailer that does a little too much teasing" to not reveal key details, such as the absence of the character M.O.D.O.K. who was shown in the D23 footage. Charles Pulliuam-Moore of The Verge compared the trailer to Disney's then-upcoming film Strange World (2022) and highlighted the Quantum Realm's appearance as being "beautiful and nonsensical", while Empire's Owen Williams compared the Quantum Realm to Ego's planet from the MCU film Guardians of the Galaxy Vol. 2 (2017).

A new trailer for the film debuted during the 2023 College Football Playoff National Championship on January 9 before it was released online. Daniel Chin of The Ringer noted the trailer had revealed "a lot" as compared to the teaser one, including the lay out of the film's plot and the first look at M.O.D.O.K. Chin felt the trailer had featured "some misdirections... but it seems to supply more advance knowledge than Marvel typically dispenses." That month, Heineken released a commercial featuring Rudd to promote their non-alcoholic beer and the film. The following month, Volkswagen released a commercial that was directed by Anthony Leonardi III to promote the film and their SUV model ID.4. Additionally, Lang's fictional memoir, Look Out for the Little Guy, was announced to be published by Hyperion Avenue, created alongside Marvel Studios and the filmmakers, and was released on September 5, 2023. It features "over 20 short pieces exploring different aspects of Scott's experiences" as a father and Avenger, and was written by Rob Kutner. Loveness wrote the passages that were featured in the film.

== Release ==
=== Theatrical ===
Ant-Man and the Wasp: Quantumania had its world premiere at Regency Village Theatre in Westwood, Los Angeles, on February 6, 2023, and was released in the United States and China on February 17, 2023. The film was previously set to be released in 2022, before being officially announced as releasing on February 17, 2023, in May 2021. It was delayed to July 28, 2023, in October 2021, and returned to the February 2023 date in April 2022. It is the first film, and start of, Phase Five of the MCU.

=== Home media ===
Ant-Man and the Wasp: Quantumania was released by Walt Disney Studios Home Entertainment on digital download on April 18, 2023; on Ultra HD Blu-ray, Blu-ray, and DVD on May 16; and on Disney+ on May 17.

The film debuted at No. 1 on Vudu's weekly chart for the week ending April 23, 2023, following its digital purchase release on April 18. It later moved to No. 2 on Vudu's chart for the week ending April 30. Upon its release on PVOD, Quantumania reached No. 1 on iTunes. It debuted at No. 1 on the Circana VideoScan First Alert chart for DVD and Blu-ray Disc unit sales for the week ending May 20, 2023. Blu-ray formats accounted for 69% of total unit sales, with 37% from regular Blu-ray and 32% from 4K Ultra HD, making it No. 1 on the dedicated 4K chart as well. In May 2023, Quantumania debuted at No. 1 on the physical disc sales chart, according to Circana's VideoScan tracking service. It was also one of the top-performing films in terms of disc sales throughout the first half of 2023.

Analytics company Samba TV, which gathers viewership data from certain smart TVs and content providers, reported that Quantumania was the second most-streamed program from May 17—23. Nielsen Media Research, which records streaming viewership on certain American television screens, calculated that the film was streamed for 766 million minutes from May 15—21. In the following week, from May 22–28, Quantumania recorded 460 million minutes of watch time, making it the third most-streamed film that week.

== Reception ==
=== Box office ===
Ant-Man and the Wasp: Quantumania grossed $214.5 million in the United States and Canada, and $261.6 million in other territories, for a worldwide total of $476.1 million. It was a box-office disappointment, falling short of its reported break-even point of $600 million, against a gross production budget of $388.4 million. This budget was initially reported to be around $200 million.

In January 2023, Ant-Man and the Wasp: Quantumania was projected to earn $120 million in North America over the four-day Presidents' Day opening weekend. The following month, it was projected to debut at $105–110 million domestically and $280 million globally in its opening weekend. The film made $46 million on its first day, including $17.5 million from Thursday previews that began at 3 pm. It went on to debut to $106.1 million (and a total of $120.4 million over the four-day frame) from 4,345 theatres, marking the best opening of the Ant-Man series and the third-best for a February release, behind Black Panther ($242.1 million in 2018) and Deadpool ($152.1 million in 2016). The film's second weekend saw a 69% drop, down to $32 million in North America, the largest second-week domestic drop-off of any Marvel Cinematic Universe film. In its third weekend, the film earned $12.4 million, for a drop of 61%.

Outside the United States and Canada, the film grossed $121.3 million in its opening weekend. In its second weekend, the film earned $46.4 million, for a drop of 57%, and remained the number one non-local movie in most markets. The film grossed $22 million from 52 markets in its third weekend, for a decline of 53%. The top five international markets were China ($39.4 million), the UK ($23.9 million), Mexico ($18 million), France ($13.6 million), and South Korea ($12.6 million).

=== Critical response ===
The review aggregator website Rotten Tomatoes reported an approval rating of 46% with an average rating of 5.5/10, based on 414 reviews. The site's critics consensus reads: "Ant-Man and the Wasp: Quantumania mostly lacks the spark of fun that elevated earlier adventures, but Jonathan Majors' Kang is a thrilling villain poised to alter the course of the MCU." On Metacritic, the film has a weighted average score of 48 out of 100, based on 61 critics, indicating "mixed or average" reviews. Audiences polled by CinemaScore gave the film an average grade of "B" on an A+ to F scale, and those polled by PostTrak reported 75% of audience members gave the film a positive score, with 60% saying they would definitely recommend it.

Owen Gleiberman from Variety was critical of the film, calling it "at once fun and numbing" and stating "...if this is what Phase 5 looks like, God save us from Phases 6, 7 and 8." Caryn James from the BBC stated that the movie has "Marvel's next big villain but other than that, it has nothing to offer beyond drab-looking action." Wendy Ide from The Guardian called Majors's performance the film's "magnetic core", but said that overall the film was "baffling and illogical". Ross Bonaime from Collider also praised Majors's performance, writing he "makes for an excellent villain, who brings nuance and subtlety to his character ... Majors makes this character [Kang] likable in the beginning, but also never hides the menace and terror that he can cause at any moment." Giving the film a B−, Bonaime stated: "Quantumania is a promising, but shaky start for Phase 5 of the Marvel Cinematic Universe, it's just a shame it comes at the sake of the little guy." Frank Scheck of The Hollywood Reporter commended Majors for "bringing real gravitas" to the film, and investing "his performance with such an arrestingly quiet stillness and ambivalence that you're on edge every moment he's onscreen." Scheck also praised Pfeiffer, writing she "is terrific in her expanded role, given the opportunity to be a badass heroine and making the most of it." Manohla Dargis from The New York Times felt Pfeiffer, Majors, and Douglas were the "truer stars of this show", but felt the overall film was "busy, noisy and thoroughly uninspired".

Richard Roeper of Chicago Sun-Times rated the film three out of four stars, writing it is a "mid-tier MCU film, with decent enough battle sequences and some nifty visuals". Leah Greenblatt of Entertainment Weekly graded the film a B+, concluding: "At just over 120 minutes, though — a blink in Marvel time — this Ant-Man is clever enough to be fun, and wise enough not overstay its welcome. Who better understands the benefits, after all, of keeping it small?" Michael Phillips of the Chicago Tribune gave the film two stars out of four, stating it is "less fun, and blandly garish visually. The earlier films' throwaway jokes and welcome aversion to brutal solemnity have largely been ditched in favor of endless endgame stuff and weirdly cheesy digital world-building in the Quantum Realm." Similarly, David Sims of The Atlantic disapprovingly compared the film to the first two entries, writing in his review: "That cleverness, combined with the special-effect goofiness of people and objects getting big and small, powered the series—and it is basically been junked here, replaced by a bunch of celestial showdowns between Kang and Ant-Man. Anytime Quantumania allows itself to get a little silly, it's in much better shape."

=== Accolades ===
Ant-Man and the Wasp: Quantumania received a nomination for Best Music Supervision in a Trailer – Film at the 2023 Guild of Music Supervisors Awards. At the 2023 MTV Movie & TV Awards, it was nominated for Best Hero (Rudd) and Best Kick-Ass Cast. The film garnered a nomination for Best Fantasy Adventure TV Spot (for a Feature Film) at the 2023 Golden Trailer Awards. The film is also nominated for Best Superhero Film at the 51st Saturn Awards, and for Best Visual Effects or Animation at the 13th AACTA Awards. At the 49th People's Choice Awards, it is nominated for Action Movie of the Year. At the 44th Golden Raspberry Awards, the film was nominated for Worst Supporting Actor for both Douglas and Murray, Worst Remake, Rip-off or Sequel, and Worst Director for Reed.

== Documentary special ==
In February 2021, the documentary series Marvel Studios: Assembled was announced. The special on this film, "The Making of Ant-Man and the Wasp: Quantumania", was released on Disney+ on July 19, 2023.

== Future ==
In February 2023, Broussard said he had started to discuss a potential fourth film with Feige and Reed. Douglas said he would be interested in returning for a fourth film if Pym died in it, but in April 2024 he said "I don't think I'm going to show up" for a fourth film because he had requested for Pym to die in Quantumania and was disappointed that this did not happen.
