= Ant-Man and The Wasp: Nano Battle! =

Attraction at Hong Kong Disneyland

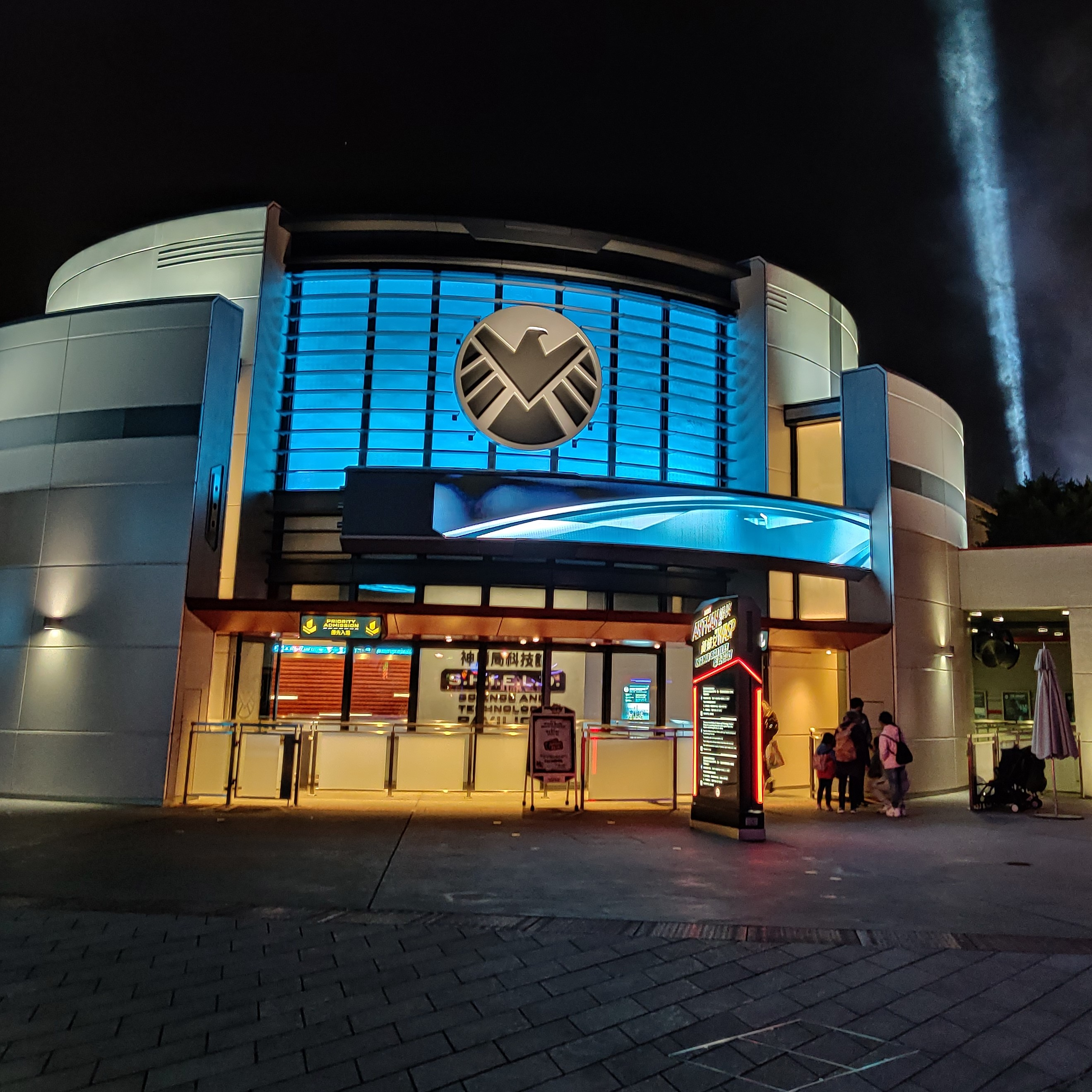
- S.H.I.E.L.D. Science and Technology Pavilion, which houses the ride

Hong Kong Disneyland
- Area: Tomorrowland (2019–present)
- Status: Operating
- Soft opening date: 28 March 2019; 7 years ago
- Opening date: 31 March 2019; 7 years ago
- Replaced: Buzz Lightyear Astro Blasters

Ride statistics
- Attraction type: Shooting Dark ride
- Manufacturers: Sansei Yusoki
- Designer: Walt Disney Imagineering
- Theme: Ant-Man and the Wasp
- Music: Christophe Beck
- Capacity: 1670 riders per hour
- Vehicle type: Omnimover
- Riders per vehicle: 3 (2 guns)
- Duration: 4min 09s (Full Speed)
- Wheelchair accessible

Ant-Man and The Wasp: Nano Battle! is an attraction located in Hong Kong Disneyland, featuring the Marvel Cinematic Universe characters Ant-Man and the Wasp. It opened on 31 March 2019.

== Plot ==
When a routine trip to the S.H.I.E.L.D. Science and Technology Pavilion at Stark Expo takes an unexpected turn, guests join forces with Ant-Man and The Wasp in S.H.I.E.L.D.'s state-of-the-art vehicle to fight against Arnim Zola and his army of Hydra swarm-bots in a heroic battle.

== Ride ==
=== Differences with the previous attraction ===
The ride uses the exact same ride layout and ride system (omnimover) as the former Buzz Lightyear Astro Blasters attraction. The show scenes and ride vehicles have been modified to fit the new storyline and the shooting system has been upgraded for more precision, using laser technology. However, the building's exterior and queue have been entirely overhauled to fit the new theme of S.H.I.E.L.D.'s Science and Technology Pavilion, with no visible traces of the old queue and ride exterior. Another difference to note is that the ride vehicles can no longer be directed by the guest and follow a precise orientation along the path.

=== Experience ===
Guests enter the newly opened S.H.I.E.L.D. Science and Technology Pavilion at the Stark Expo in Hong Kong Disneyland, where they are supposed to discover technological innovations showcased by SHIELD. In the lobby, guests discover through screens featuring Leslie Lam, Ant-Man, the Wasp and Iron Man that the Pavilion is under attack by Dr. Arnim Zola and his army of Swarmbots. Their goal is to steal the "Data Core", precious data stored by SHIELD in the Pavilion. During the queue guests are asked by the protagonists to participate in the fight along with Ant-Man and The Wasp using the Daggers (ride vehicle) and EMP-Blasters (shooter gun). Many easter eggs are hidden in the actor's video appearances, such as Rudd and Lilly speaking Cantonese. Visitors are also able to browse select artifacts from the Marvel Cinematic Universe, including the Destroyer Armor Prototype Gun Agent Phil Coulson used to confront Loki with in The Avengers (2012).

Guests then board their ride vehicles and use their guns to shoot targets disposed in the different scenes in order to destroy the swarmbots, which remain stationary. Ant-Man and the Wasp are featured during the ride fighting alongside the guests through screens and audio. At the middle of the ride, guests have the illusion of being shrunk by the superheroes in order to destroy the bots from the inside. At the end of the ride, guests and superheroes defeat Arnim Zola. After being congratulated by all the protagonists (which featured clips from past Marvel movies), guest disembark from their vehicles and enter the attraction's gift shop, Pavilion Gifts.

=== Cantonese, English and Mandarin Cast ===
- Paul Rudd as Scott Lang / Ant-Man
- Evangeline Lilly as Hope van Dyne / Wasp
- Toby Jones as Arnim Zola
- Jessica Hsuan as Leslie Lam
- Adrian Pasdar as Iron Man (voice)

== Development ==
The attraction was announced on 22 November 2016 as part of the new expansion plan coming to Hong Kong Disneyland. At the time, it was described as a "brand new experience for guests to fight alongside the icons of the Marvel Universe", with no further details on the experience, except a concept-art featuring Ant-Man. This attraction is currently featured in the Stark Expo, along with the Iron Man Experience and the upcoming Avengers E-ticket attraction.

Buzz Lightyear Astro Blasters closed on 31 August 2017 to make way for the new attraction, which uses the same overall infrastructure.

On 13 February 2018, it was announced at the D23 Expo Japan that the new attraction would be centered around Marvel Cinematic Universe superheroes Ant-Man and the Wasp fighting against Arnim Zola.

The attraction, along with its opening date, were officially presented to the public on 8 January 2019 by the imagineers in charge of the project. It was announced that the ride would share a common narrative with the other Marvel attraction present at Hong Kong Disneyland, Iron Man Experience, and that the team from the eponymous movies, including Peyton Reed, Christophe Beck, Paul Rudd, Evangeline Lilly and Toby Jones were involved in the attraction, with the actors reprising their respective roles of Ant-Man / Scott Lang, The Wasp / Hope Van Dyne and Arnim Zola in the attraction. Bryan Thombs, senior creative director of Nano Battle from Walt Disney Imagineering, stated a key part of the experience would be the difference in scale between the normal world and the gigantic size of everything as seen from a miniature perspective.

Before Opening, it was announced that Jessica Hsuan, a Hong Kong-based actress, would play the role of Leslie Lam, a S.H.I.E.L.D. scientist, making the link between the superheroes and the guests.

== Opening ceremony ==
The launch ceremony was held on Thursday 28 March 2019. It was attended by more than 1,000 guests, including Hong Kong Financial Secretary Paul Chan Mo-po, Jessica Hsuan, who plays a Hong Kong-specific Marvel character named Leslie Lam, Paul Rudd, Marvel Studios president Kevin Feige, Marvel Entertainment's chief creative officer Joe Quesada, Ant-Man director Peyton Reed and producer Stephen Broussard.

== See also ==
- Avengers Campus
- Iron Man Experience
- Guardians of the Galaxy – Mission: Breakout!
- Web Slingers: A Spider-Man Adventure
