= Hope van Dyne =

Character in Marvel Cinematic Universe

- Marvel Cinematic Universe character
- Evangeline Lilly as Hope van Dyne / Wasp in Ant-Man and the Wasp (2018)
- First appearance: Ant-Man; 2015
- Last appearance: Ant-Man and the Wasp: Quantumania; 2023
- Based on: Hope Pym by: Tom DeFalco; Ron Frenz
- Adapted by: Edgar Wright; Joe Cornish; Adam McKay; Paul Rudd
- Portrayed by: Evangeline Lilly; Madeleine McGraw (young)

In-universe information
- Full name: Hope van Dyne (née Pym)
- Alias: Wasp
- Affiliation: Pym Technologies (former); Pym van Dyne Foundation; Avengers
- Weapon: Wasp suit
- Family: Hank Pym (father); Janet van Dyne (mother)
- Significant other: Scott Lang
- Origin: San Francisco, California, United States
- Nationality: American

Hope van Dyne (née Pym) is a fictional character portrayed primarily by Evangeline Lilly in the Marvel Cinematic Universe (MCU) media franchise, loosely based on the Marvel Comics character Hope Pym. Portrayed as the daughter of Hank Pym and Janet van Dyne, she was a senior board member of her father's company, Pym Technologies, and later inherits the Wasp alias from her mother, using a suit containing her father's technology to shrink and fly with insect-themed wings. Her appearances have been praised for their authentic and relatable portrayal of a superheroine.

After rekindling her relationship with her father, Van Dyne works with him to rescue her mother who was previously lost to the Quantum Realm, and defeat various supervillains including Yellowjacket and Ghost. Van Dyne later falls victim to the Blip, but is later restored to life and joins the Avengers in a battle against Thanos. Afterwards, she buys back her father's company renaming it the Pym van Dyne Foundation and continues her relationship with Scott Lang, becoming a mother figure to his daughter, Cassie Lang. She is later trapped in the Quantum Realm alongside her family and assists them in defeating Kang the Conqueror.

Lilly appeared as Van Dyne in the films Ant-Man (2015), Ant-Man and the Wasp (2018), Avengers: Endgame (2019) and Ant-Man and the Wasp: Quantumania (2023). Madeleine McGraw portrayed a younger version of Van Dyne. Alternate versions of Van Dyne appear in the Disney+ animated series What If...? (2021–2024), also voiced by Lilly and McGraw. Van Dyne is noted for being the first titular superheroine in a MCU film, preceding Captain Marvel, Black Widow, and Black Panther, and for inspiring the creation of comic superheroine Nadia van Dyne.

== Casting and creation ==
In 2012, director Joss Whedon originally intended to have Zooey Deschanel appear as the Marvel Comics character the Wasp in The Avengers due to potential scheduling conflicts preventing Scarlett Johansson from appearing as Natasha Romanoff. By 2013, production began for a film based on the Marvel Comics character Ant-Man with various actresses in talks to play the female lead including Jessica Chastain, Emma Stone, Rashida Jones and Bryce Dallas Howard. In February 2014, The Hollywood Reporter reported that Canadian actress Evangeline Lilly was in talks for the role. It was eventually announced at the 2014 San Diego Comic-Con that Lilly was cast as an original character named Hope van Dyne, based on the Marvel Comics character Hope Pym who was the daughter of superheroes Hank Pym / Ant-Man and Janet van Dyne / Wasp. She went on to sign a multi-film contract.

Initially set to direct the film, Edgar Wright left the film late 2013 and was replaced by Peyton Reed. Lilly noted that she was reluctant to take the role until she read the revised script and met with Reed. After reading the revised script, she felt that the film was "pulled" more into the MCU than Wright's version which "would not have fit in the Marvel Universe". Reed and Lilly alongside Paul Rudd who was set to star as Scott Lang, contributed ideas to the revised script to help flesh out Lilly's character who received a bigger arc and more action sequences as a result. One of the important things for Reed when joining the film was emphasizing both Hope and Janet van Dyne more, given Janet is "a crucial part" of the Ant-Man comics. Hope shares her last name with her mother rather than her father as "statement of her ambivalence toward her father". Lilly noted that the name change "emphasizes the challenges the two characters need to overcome in order to reconcile, as well as reflects the tragedy of Janet's loss that created the rift in the first place".

== Characterization ==
=== Personality and depictions ===
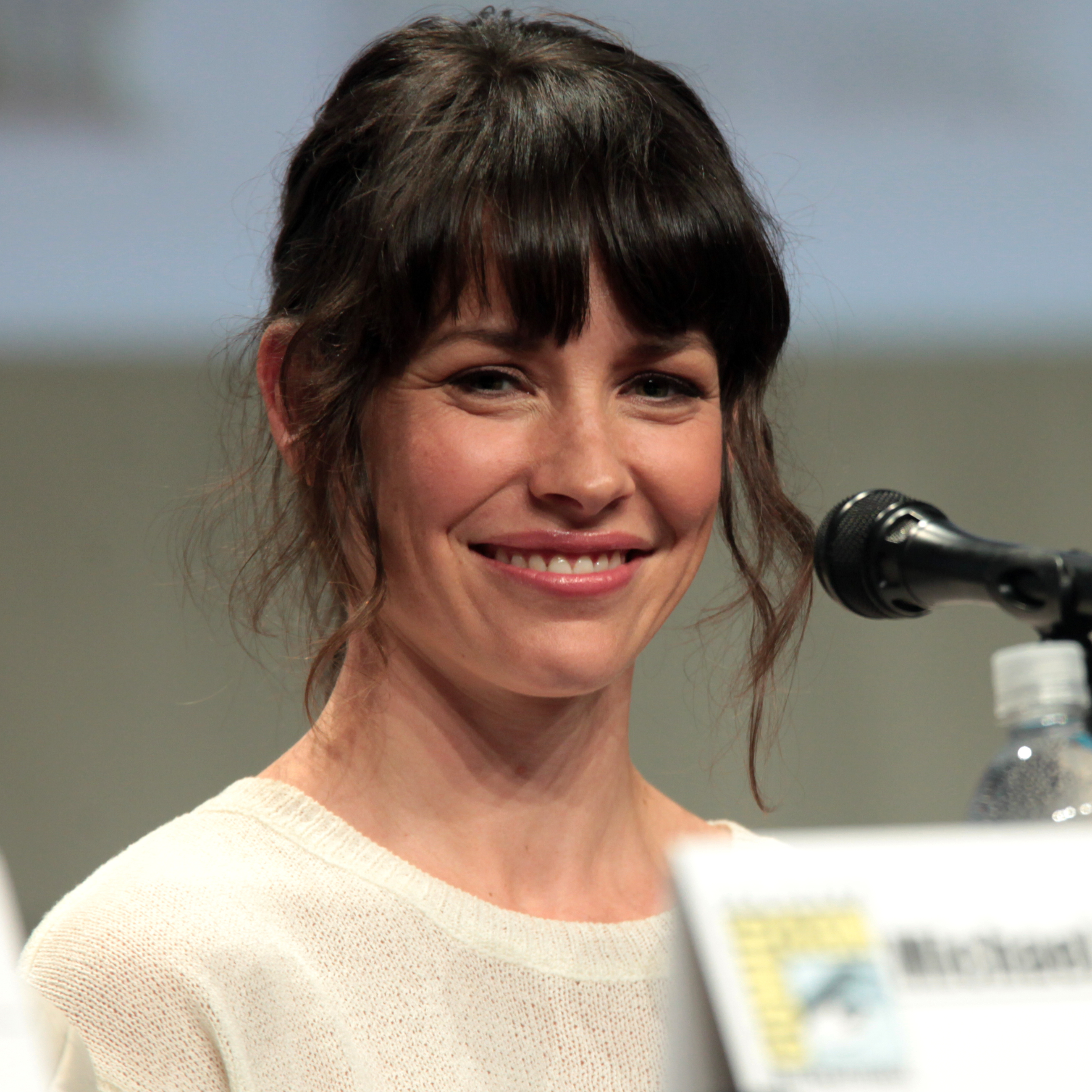

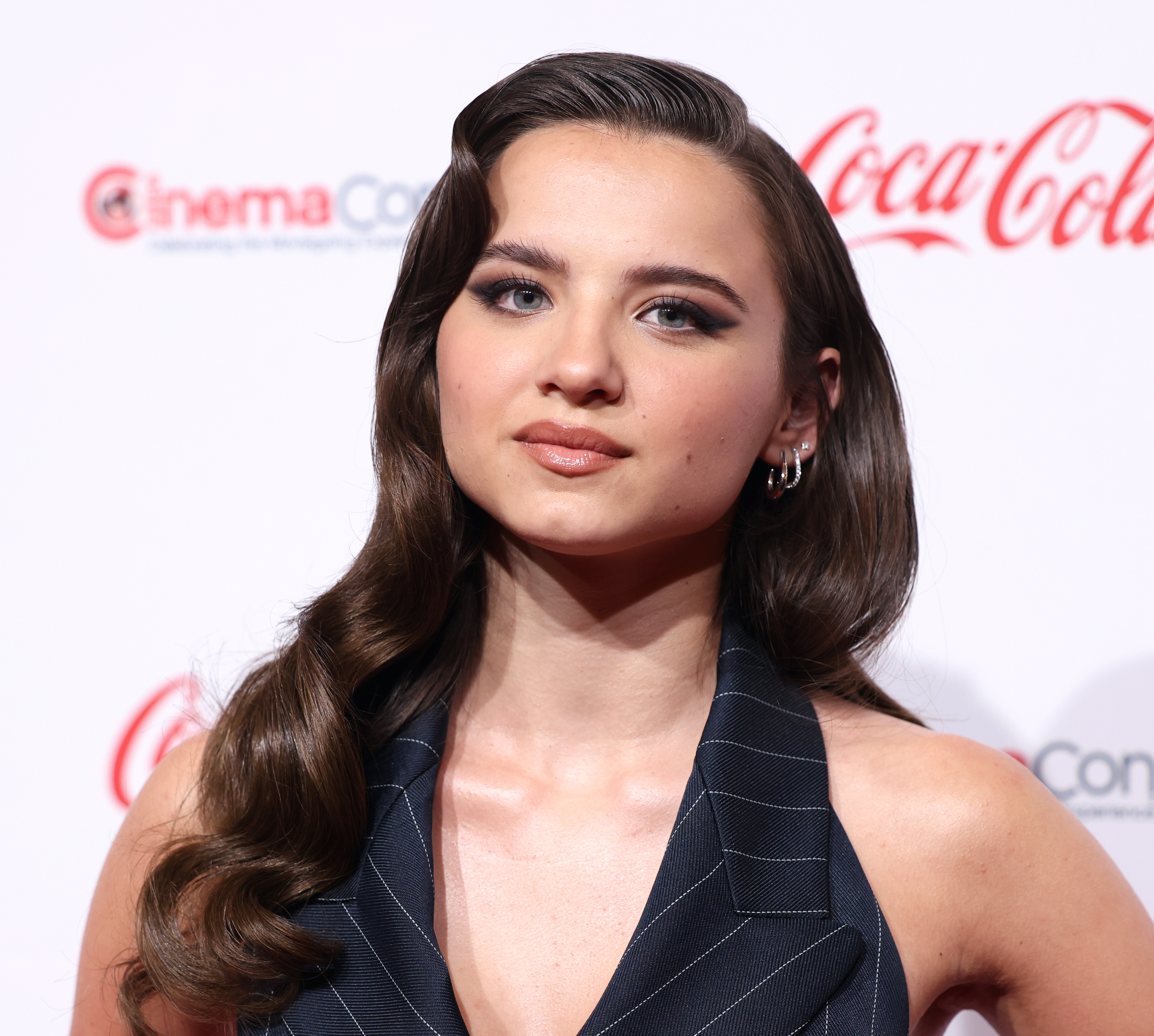
Canadian actress Evangeline Lilly (top) and American actress Madeleine McGraw (bottom) have both respectively portrayed an adult and younger version of Van Dyne in various MCU media

Hope van Dyne first appeared in Ant-Man (2015) and is introduced as the daughter of former S.H.I.E.L.D. agents Hank Pym and Janet van Dyne, and senior board member of her father's company Pym Technologies. Lilly described her character as "capable, strong, and kick-ass", but said that being raised by two superheroes resulted in Hope being "a pretty screwed up human being [...] and the clear message sent by my name is that I'm not a big fan of my father and so I took my mother's name." She added that Van Dyne's "arc in the movie is trying to find a relationship" with Pym, which in turn brings Hope closer to becoming a hero. Kevin Feige noted that Van Dyne was the more obvious choice to take up the mantle of Ant-Man, being "infinitely more capable of actually being a superhero" than Lang, and that the reason she does not is because Pym is afraid of losing her, rather than sexism. Despite this, at the end of the film during a mid-credits scene, Van Dyne is offered a prototype for a new suit from her father.

Lilly reprised her role and made her debut as the Wasp in Ant-Man and the Wasp (2018). In the film, Van Dyne takes on the mantle to help find her mother who is presumed lost in the Quantum Realm. The writers were excited to properly introduce the character as the Wasp, showing her "power set, how she fights, and what are the injustices that matter to her". Lilly felt the character had "incredible satisfaction" in becoming the Wasp, "something that she has been waiting for her whole life" noting that it "is essentially an affirmation from her father". Her relationship with Lang in the film is complex as she is upset about his involvement in the Avengers Civil War believing that if he had asked her to join him fighting alongside Steve Rogers and his allies, he wouldn't have been caught. With her fight sequences, Lilly stated that she wanted to move away from masculine styles of fighting such as Muay Thai and the mixed martial arts she learned for the first film, noting that Van Dyne moves differently than a man, so her fights should have "elegance, grace and femininity" with "a signature style" young girls could enjoy and emulate. Lilly worked with the writers to help ensure Van Dyne represented a modern woman without becoming a stereotyped motherly figure. Additionally, American actress Madeleine McGraw portrayed a younger version of Van Dyne in the film.

In late 2016, two new Avengers films were announced for 2018 and 2019. Lilly confirmed that Van Dyne would appear in the second film in order to preserve her debut in the titular Ant-Man and the Wasp. In Avengers: Endgame (2019), Van Dyne was brought by Doctor Strange to fight alongside the Avengers in the Battle of Earth. In 2021, Lilly voiced an alternate version of Van Dyne in season one of the animated series What If...?, appearing in the episode "What If... Zombies?!" where she rescues Janet who brings back a quantum zombie virus which infects the United States and eventually the world; Van Dyne is later infected and turns into a zombie. This storyline was further explored in the adult animated television series Marvel Zombies (2025) which also featured zombie Van Dyne. In another episode, "What If... the World Lost Its Mightiest Heroes?", it is revealed that Van Dyne was recruited as a S.H.I.E.L.D. agent by Nick Fury but killed in Odessa, Ukraine (Note: Van Dyne was killed by the Winter Soldier; Natasha Romanoff originally went on the mission in the Sacred Timeline.) causing her father to murder potential members of Fury's Avengers Initiative in revenge.

Lilly reprised her role in Ant-Man and the Wasp: Quantumania (2023). Lilly noted that she was excited to "show a side of [Van Dyne] where she would make mistakes, she would be fragile, and she wouldn't always have the right answer". In the film, Van Dyne is in a good place having healed her relationship with her father, succeeded in saving her mother, fallen in love with Scott and is now a mother figure to his daughter Cassie Lang. She sees Cassie "as a little girl who needs coddling or protecting". Contrastingly, her relationship with her own mother at the beginning of the film is the polar opposite where Janet tires to protect Van Dyne by not letting her in. After the film's release, in an interview with The Hollywood Reporter, Lilly noted that Hope did not change much in the movie adding that "there wasn't somewhere [Van Dyne] needed to get to or go other than just to repair a little wound in her relationship with her mom". In the film, it is also revealed that Van Dyne bought her father's company back, renaming it the Pym van Dyne Foundation "tackling housing and food shortages". The company later makes a brief appearance on Times Square billboards in Daredevil: Born Again (2025).

In December 2023, more alternate versions of Van Dyne appeared in two episodes of What If...? season two. A younger version of Van Dyne, voiced by McGraw, appeared in "What If... Peter Quill Attacked Earth's Mightiest Heroes?" acting as "Hank's conscience" as he assists S.H.I.E.L.D. in taking in a powered Peter Quill. Van Dyne also made a non-speaking appearance in "What If... Captain Carter Fought the Hydra Stomper?" where she follows Captain Carter's lead as a founding member of the Avengers. Head writer, A. C. Bradley, noted that "Since Peggy Carter wasn't around to found S.H.I.E.L.D., that responsibility fell to Hope's parents, Hank and Janet [...] All this lead [sic] to Hope taking on the Wasp mantle earlier". In 2024, Lilly announced that she was "stepping away" from acting. Screen Rant writer Ross Tanenbaum later opined that her retirement leaves Van Dyne's MCU future in question but also noted that in the multiverse anyone can be "recast".

=== Unrealized projects ===
In 2016, Feige revealed that Lilly was to appear as the Wasp in an original draft of the film Captain America: Civil War (2016), but was cut out of the final script because "there were so many characters in Civil War that [they] didn't want to do her a disservice". Peyton Reed noted that "Scott almost did call Hope" but the Russo brothers and screenwriters felt that there was too much story riding on the backs of too many characters to do justice to Wasp". An alternate version of the Wasp was originally set to appear in the first draft of Doctor Strange in the Multiverse of Madness (2022) as a part of the Illuminati with head writer, Michael Waldron, revealing that the Scarlet Witch would have "clapped her hands and smushed the Wasp". Writer, Jeff Loveness, explained that there was also a scene in Quantumania which showed Van Dyne having a son which "would've come in the 'probability storm' scene" but was cut because it "didn't fit in the flow".

=== Wasp suit and costume design ===

Van Dyne's suits as depicted in Ant-Man (top) and Ant-Man and the Wasp: Quantumania (bottom)

An unfinished version of Van Dyne's Wasp suit first appeared in the Ant-Man mid-credit scene. The suit was navy blue with golden and red strips of colour around, and was not seen in full until the film's sequel. It was based on drawings by concept artist Andy Park, designed by British costume designer Louise Frogley and "required a four-month period of research and development before filmmakers arrived at a satisfactory result". The suit was called a "significant upgrade" from Lang's Ant-Man suit as it features "Wasp stinger" blasters, has more intuitive control allowing Van Dyne to shrink to any size, (Note: As described by Lang in his memoir, Look Out for the Little Guy: Van Dyne "can simply think about what size she wants to be and the suit obeys".) while additionally giving her wings which retract into the back of her suit, in comparison to Lang who utilises ants for aerial transport. Lilly opined that this upgrade was due to Lang's suit being Hank's from the 1960s. She also compared it to Iron Man's armour due to both not needing buttons to activate.

Throughout the films, Van Dyne's hairstyle has seen three different changes including a bob cut, a ponytail and a pixie cut. For the first film, Joanna Robinson of Vanity Fair criticised the use of Van Dyne's hairstyle saying "the most extreme thing Hope wears is that severe haircut". Her ponytail, which made its debut in the second film, received critical acclaim with Mashable writer, Angie Han, noting that it was not a "fancy sci-fi updo or anything" but rather a "plain old messy ponytail, the likes of which you've seen on every long-haired woman at the gym". She added, "It may not sound like a big deal but that one detail speaks volumes about who Hope is [...] The MCU movies' first true leading lady isn't a literal goddess, or a mysterious spy, or a space assassin – She's a down-to-earth lady who's just like us. And that means she pulls her hair back when she beats up bad guys".

In Ant-Man and the Wasp: Quantumania, Van Dyne's suit received an ugrade. Paying homage to the original Janet van Dyne costume, Van Dyne's suit was more "comic-accurate" being "bug-like and brightly colored" with black and yellow colours. Her hairstyle was in a pixie cut for the film as Lilly had shaved her head four years prior and the call was made to do "another callback to the original Wasp in the comics" as she "often had a little short, dark pixie cut". The hairstyle received generally mixed reviews.

=== VFX and special effects ===
Scanline VFX worked on the Wasp's special effects. Marvel Studios VFX supervisor Stephane Ceretti noted that they wanted Van Dyne to "move in a very balletic way and we wanted her to be very graceful in the way she flies". Wanting to avoid comparisons to Tinker Bell, Ceretti added that they studied parkour and came up with a set of rules for her flying and fighting including that "she can only fly when she's small". The VFX team utilised macro photography, motion control camera work, and animation to constantly change scale and perspective for her fight scenes.

== Original comic derivations ==
Throughout the mainstream comics set in the Marvel Universe (Earth-616), the superhero character, Wasp, was Janet van Dyne, who debuted in the anthology series Tales to Astonish #44 (June 1963, plotted by Stan Lee, scripted by H.E. Huntley, and drawn by Jack Kirby) as Ant-Man / Henry "Hank" Pym's partner, having become the Wasp to avenge the death of her father. Janet co-starred in Tales to Astonish as the Wasp until #69 (1963–65) and was a founding member of the Avengers. Throughout the Marvel Cinematic Universe (MCU), Janet van Dyne (portrayed by Michelle Pfeiffer) is introduced as the mother to Hope van Dyne and was presumed dead after she shrunk to subatomic level to stop a nuclear missile, becoming trapped in the Quantum Realm. In the MCU, Nick Fury's Avengers Initiative was inspired and named after Captain Marvel's call sign, while in the comics the Avengers were named by Janet.

Hope van Dyne is an original character in the MCU and was loosely based on the concept of supervillain Hope Pym, also known as the Red Queen, who is also the daughter of Hank Pym and Janet van Dyne. Hope Pym existed in the MC2 universe alongside her twin brother, Henry Pym Jr. Conversely, the filmmakers of Ant-Man noted that they "decided to reimagine [Van Dyne] as a more sympathetic character" and she "didn't give in to her hate the same way her comic book counterpart did and even began aiding her [estranged] father once she found out that a new villain was going to abuse his technology".

== Fictional character biography ==
=== Early life ===
Hope van Dyne was born to high-ranking S.H.I.E.L.D. agents Hank Pym and Janet van Dyne, and grew up in San Francisco, California. She becomes estranged from her father after he hides the circumstances of the disappearance of her mother and sends her to boarding school. His subsequent cold and distant behavior towards her also causes her to adopt her mother's maiden name. She later becomes the chairman of her father's company Pym Technologies and was the deciding vote in casting him out as CEO.

=== Meeting Scott Lang ===
In 2015, Van Dyne seeks out Pym's help after finding out how close the new CEO, Darren Cross, is from replicating the Ant-Man shrinking technology. Cross plans to mass-produce and sell this technology as military hardware known as the Yellowjacket suit. In response, Pym recruits convicted thief Scott Lang to become the new Ant-Man to steal the Yellowjacket from Cross. Van Dyne is against using Lang, believing herself to be the superior choice. Pym refuses to let her use the suit, so she calls the police on Lang after he steals the Ant-Man costume from Pym's house, despite Pym wanting him to. After Pym breaks Lang out of jail, Van Dyne reluctantly helps train Lang to fully harness the Ant-Man suit's abilities. While Hope still holds resentment towards Pym, she begins to reconcile with her father after he reveals that her mother shrank herself down to disarm a missile and became trapped in the subatomic Quantum Realm. Consequently, Van Dyne and Pym work together to successfully aid Lang in thwarting Cross' plans by destroying the Pym Technologies headquarters. Afterwards, Van Dyne begins a relationship with Lang, while Pym offers to finish making a new Wasp prototype suit with her that he and Janet had started to make.

=== Rescuing Janet and resurrection ===
In 2018, Van Dyne and Pym are in hiding due to Lang's involvement with the Avengers, (Note: As depicted in Captain America: Civil War (2016)) in violation of the Sokovia Accords. The two subsequently cut ties with Lang who is placed on house arrest. Despite being on the run, Van Dyne and Pym start investigating ways to bring back Janet from the Quantum Realm. They briefly open a tunnel to the Quantum Realm and after receiving a call from Lang who is having dreams of Van Dyne's childhood experiences with her mother, the two work out that Lang had unknowingly become quantumly entangled with Janet. They manage to kidnap Lang, leaving a large ant with Lang's ankle-monitor on as a decoy so as not to arouse the suspicions of the FBI agent Jimmy Woo. Van Dyne dons the Wasp suit for the first time with Lang as the Ant-Man and the two arrange to buy a part needed for the tunnel from black-market dealer Sonny Burch. Van Dyne is attacked by the quantumly unstable Ava Starr who has teamed up with Pym's former college Bill Foster, to use the tunnel to cure Starr of her fatal molecular instability. Van Dyne and Lang fight the rival parties to keep their quantum technology safe so Pym can travel into the Quantum Realm to save Janet. Pym manages to successfully bring Janet back from the Quantum Realm and Van Dyne reunites with her mother. Van Dyne also meets Lang's daughter, Cassie Lang.

Van Dyne, her parents and Lang plan to harvest quantum energy to cure Starr's condition. However, Van Dyne and her parents disintegrate, falling victim to the Blip, leaving Lang trapped in the Quantum Realm for five years in present time. In 2023, Van Dyne is restored to life and is brought by Masters of the Mystic Arts to join the final battle against an alternate Thanos. A week after the battle, Van Dyne, alongside her restored parents and Lang, attends Tony Stark's funeral. She then returns home and spends time with Lang and Cassie.

=== Exploring the Quantum Realm ===
By 2026, Van Dyne buys back her father's company and renames it the Pym van Dyne Foundation, utilizing Pym Particles to advance humanitarian efforts. She continues her relationship with Lang, and furthers her role as mother figure to Cassie. Van Dyne also holds resentment for her mother who refuses to talk about her time spent in the Quantum Realm. After being bailed out from jail by Van Dyne and Lang, Cassie reveals that after the Blip, with the help of Van Dyne and Pym, she created a satellite that could make contact with the Quantum Realm. Despite Janet's protests, upon turning the satellite on, Van Dyne, Lang, Cassie, Pym and Janet are pulled into the Quantum Realm. Van Dyne, separated from Lang and Cassie, finds her parents and begins to explore the city inside the realm. The trio meet Lord Krylar, a former ally of Janet's, who attempts to arrest them. Van Dyne fights Krylar's men, and helps her parents flee and steal his ship.

Janet reveals to Van Dyne that she is indirectly responsible for the realm's uprising, having helped Kang the Conqueror (Krylar's boss) rebuild his Multiversal Power Core after his exile, before ultimately enlarging it to render it unusable. Van Dyne reconciles with her mother, and vows to not let Kang escape the realm. The trio arrive at the enlarged Core which has created a probability storm. Van Dyne flies into the storm to save Lang, who had made a deal with Kang to shrink the power core in exchange for Cassie. After Van Dyne rescues Lang and shrinks the Core, Kang retracts his deal, capturing Janet and seemingly killing Pym. Pym, who is saved by hyper-intelligent evolved ants, helps Van Dyne and Lang commence a rebellion against Kang with the help of Cassie and the residents of the Quantum Realm. Van Dyne, Lang and Cassie fight Kang and take down his army. While seemingly having beaten him, the family reunite and manage to make their way back to their reality through a portal powered by Kang's Power Core. Van Dyne flies back through the portal to rescue Lang who was pulled back into a fight with Kang. The two defeat him by knocking him into the Power Core, causing him to be pulled into oblivion. Cassie reopens the portal on her end for Lang and Van Dyne to return home and the family happily resume their life.

== Alternate versions ==
Several alternate versions of Van Dyne appear in the animated series What If...?, with Lilly and McGraw reprising their roles.

=== Zombie outbreak ===
In an alternate 2018, Van Dyne succeeds in bringing her parents back from the Quantum Realm. However, Janet has been infected with a quantum virus which has subsequently turned her and Pym into a zombie. Within 24 hours, the virus spreads across the Northwestern United States with Van Dyne escaping and becoming one of the sole survivors of Earth. After saving Bruce Banner, who was sent to Earth to warn humanity about Thanos, Van Dyne, alongside other survivors (including Peter Parker, Bucky Barnes, Okoye, Sharon Carter, Kurt, and Happy Hogan) leave their base in New York City and travel to Camp Lehigh where a cure is said to be in development. En route to Camp Lehigh, the team are attacked and Van Dyne becomes infected. She sacrifices herself by turning giant to allow the others to escape and she carries the surviving team to the camp, eventually succumbing to the virus.

Van Dyne, now part of the Queen of the Dead's army, later attacks Lang and Parker in giant form when they try to stop the Queen from acquiring the Infinity Hulk's powers.

=== 1988 Avengers vs. Ego ===
In an alternate 1988, a younger Van Dyne accompanies her father Pym to S.H.I.E.L.D.'s Nevada base who is recruited by Peggy Carter and Howard Stark to join a team to fight a celestial-powered younger Peter Quill. After Quill is captured, Van Dyne finds him in his cell while wandering around the base. The two bond over the loss of their mothers and Van Dyne gifts Quill her walkman. She frees him to allow him to return to his home in Missouri. She later defends Quill to the adults, insisting that he needs help. She stays behind with Stark while the team handle Quill's father, Ego, and witnesses him stealing his seedling from the base. After Pym manages to convince Quill to defeat Ego, she returns to her house with everyone, including Quill, for a victory party and meets Wendy Lawson's pet Goose.

=== Other universes ===
- In an alternate universe, Van Dyne was recruited as a S.H.I.E.L.D. agent by Nick Fury, but killed by the Winter Soldier during a mission in Odesa, Ukraine. This led to Hank becoming the Yellowjacket and murdering potential candidates from Fury's Avengers Initiative out of revenge.
- In an alternate 2012, Van Dyne becomes a member of the Avengers, consisting of Captain Peggy Carter, Natasha Romanoff, Tony Stark, Clint Barton and Thor, and fights the Chitauri during the Battle of New York. Her parents, Pym and Janet, had helped found S.H.I.E.L.D, leading to Van Dyne taking on the Wasp mantle earlier than other universes.

== Reception ==
=== Critical response ===
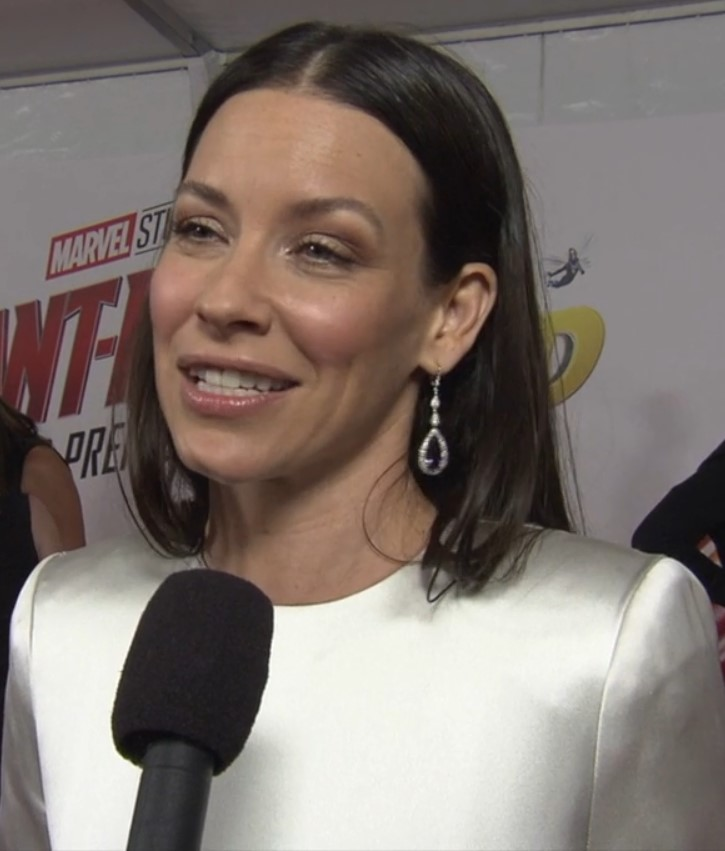
Evangeline Lilly (pictured at the premiere for Ant-Man and the Wasp) received generally positive reception for her role as the Wasp

For her role in the first Ant-Man film The A.V. Club writer, Sam Barsanti noted that, "Hope is much more well-suited [...] to be a superhero than Paul Rudd's Scott Lang" but she didn't "get to do nearly as much stuff". Contrarily, for Ant-Man and the Wasp, Stephanie Zacharek, writing for Time, felt that "the focus on Lilly as a better hero than Rudd was just checking off boxes in the name of gender equality". Amon Warmann of Yahoo! News praised Lilly's voice role as Van Dyne in the fifth episode of What If...?, "What If... Zombies?!", feeling that she "gave the episode's strongest performance" and that "Hope's final act of going giant size for the first time in the MCU was beautifully played".

Van Dyne's role in Ant-Man and the Wasp received higher praise than the first film with Insider writer, Kirsten Acuna, noting that, "Wasp is even more enjoyable to watch on screen". She added that "not only can she build great tech, but she's also an expert at hand-to-hand combat" and that her and Lang "are pretty great to see working side by side". Vox writer, Alex Abad-Santos. agreed saying that in the sequel, "Lilly's Hope van Dyne was the smarter, tougher, better-trained character" and that "the movie fully acknowledges that Hope is the more adept superhero by letting her lead the way in these sequences".

On Lilly's role in Quantumania, ScreenGeek writer, Mark Salcido, noted that Van Dyne was "stilted" and sidelined to Rudd's Lang, but added that she had a few "rare touching moments between her and Pfeiffer". Conversely, The Hollywood Reporter writer, Frank Scheck, found "Lilly's Wasp has plenty of moments to shine" but noted that it was "frustrating to see the main characters separated into various groups for long stretches of the film". In a review for the film, IGN writer, Joshua Yehl, noted Lilly's small role, saying that it "feels strange for a character who's mentioned in the title". TheWrap writer, Alonso Duralde, also wrote that Van Dyne felt "admittedly lost among all [the] characters" and that "despite the Wasp's inclusion in the title", the "superhero comes off as a bit of an afterthought once all is said and done". Daily Bruin writer, Francis Moon, also felt that "Lilly takes a backseat with no development of her character Hope or her alter-ego, the Wasp" in the film.

=== Legacy and cultural impact ===
In 2018, after appearing in Ant-Man and the Wasp, Van Dyne became the first superheroine to be a titular character in a Marvel Cinematic Universe film, preceding Carol Danvers in Captain Marvel, Natasha Romanoff in Black Widow and Shuri in Black Panther: Wakanda Forever. Amelia Rayne Kim of Screen Rant noted that Van Dyne becoming the Wasp "not only made sense for the narrative but it prevented her from being simply a supporting character or a love interest". Kim added that her titular introduction "broke down another barrier to the women of this universe achieving equal footing with its men". On including the Wasp in the film's title for Ant-Man and the Wasp, Peyton Reed called it "organic" for both characters, and noted the Wasp's final line in Ant-Man—'It's about damn time'—as "very much about her specific character and arc in that movie, but it is absolutely about a larger thing. It's about damn time: We're going to have a fully realized, very very complicated hero in the next movie who happens to be a woman." Reed would also push to ensure the Wasp received equal publicity and merchandise for the film.

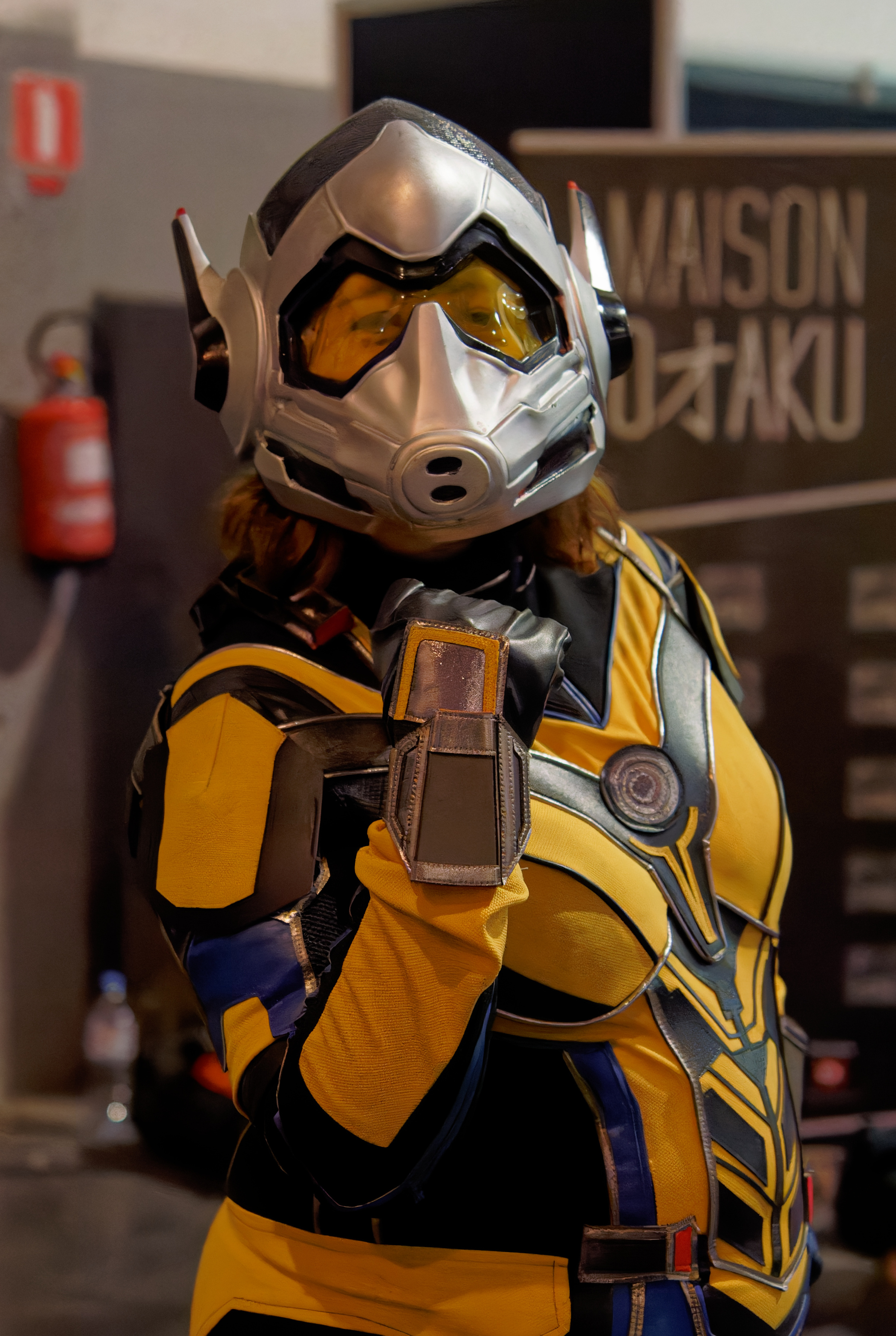
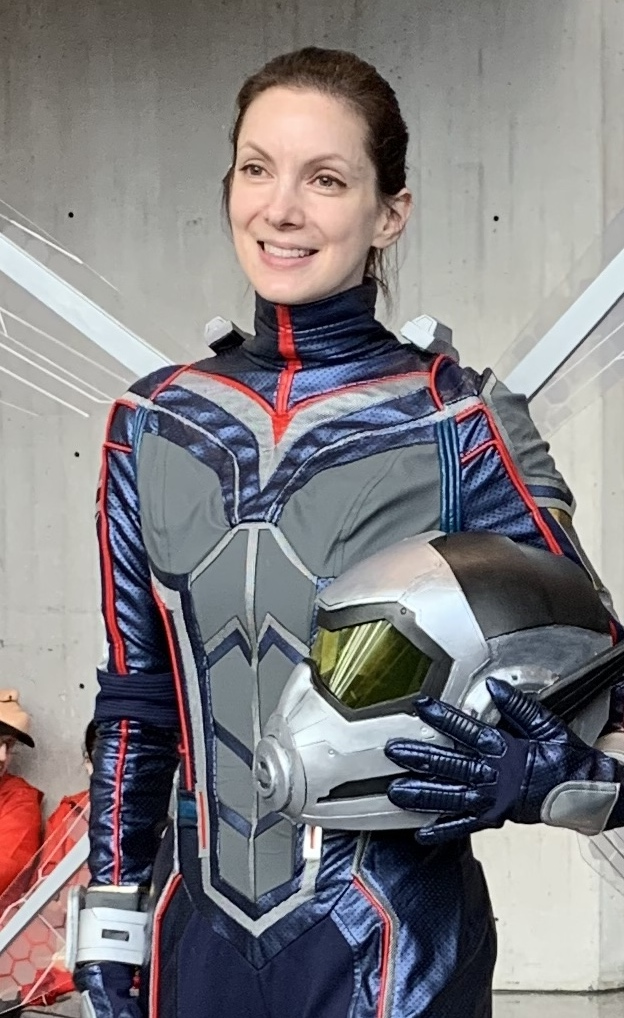
Fans cosplaying two iterations of Van Dyne's Wasp suits from Quantumania (left) and Ant-Man and the Wasp (right) at various cons.

In an article comparing Van Dyne's humanitarian efforts to Thanos' infamous snap, Screen Rant writer Derek Stauffer wrote that Van Dyne succeeded where Thanos failed. He noted that Van Dyne's Pym van Dyne Foundation "managed to provide for a planet already in a state of overpopulation" rather than "eradicate life, as Thanos wanted". To promote Ant-Man and the Wasp: Quantumania (2023), ZipRecruiter featured the company in an advertising skit showcasing "an engineer who landed her dream job working alongside [...] the Wasp".

==== Creation of Nadia van Dyne ====
Van Dyne inspired the creation of Marvel Comics character Nadia van Dyne who made her debut in the Free Comic Book Day 2016 Civil War II. "Nadia" is a Russian language translated name of "Hope". In July 2016, Nadia was introduced as the Unstoppable Wasp, the daughter of Hank Pym and his first wife Maria Trovaya who was originally recruited to the Red Room and trained as an assassin. On Nadia's creation, Mark Waid noted that, "Tom Brevoort and I both have a great love for the original Wasp, Janet van Dyne, and in the wake of the Ant-Man movie (which was great), Tom suggested there might be something to introducing someone who was a nod to that film's Hope van Dyne without in any way minimizing Janet's role".

=== Accolades ===
Year	Work	Award	Category	Result	Ref(s)
2015	Ant-Man	Teen Choice Awards	Choice Summer Movie Star: Female	Nominated	
2016	Ant-Man	Saturn Awards	Saturn Award for Best Supporting Actress	Nominated	
2019	Ant-Man and the Wasp	Teen Choice Awards	Choice Action Movie Actress	Nominated	

== In other media ==
=== Media attractions ===
In 2019, Evangeline Lilly reprised her role as Hope van Dyne / Wasp for the MCU inspired media attraction, Ant-Man and The Wasp: Nano Battle!, for Hong Kong Disneyland. That same year, she also voiced the character in the virtual reality experience Avengers: Damage Control developed by ILMxLAB. The story found Van Dyne teaming up with various characters including Shuri, Doctor Strange, against the supervillain Ultron.

In 2022, Lilly also reprised her role in the immersive family dining experience Avengers: Quantum Encounter on the Disney Wish cruise ship. In the experience, Van Dyne and Lang demonstrate quantum tech to the audience which causes them to be attacked by Ultron; Avengers Ms. Marvel, Captain America and Captain Marvel are called in to help defeat him. Disney noted that it "is set within its own universe".

=== Television ===
- Hope van Dyne / Wasp appears in the animated series Ant-Man (2017), voiced by Melissa Rauch.
- Hope van Dyne / Wasp appears in Avengers Assemble (2017), voiced by Kari Wahlgren.
- Hope van Dyne / Wasp appears in Marvel Super Hero Adventures (2017–2018), voiced by Marlie Collins.

=== Video games ===
Hope van Dyne / Wasp appears a playable character in Lego Marvel's Avengers and Lego Marvel Superheroes 2, via DLC. She also appears as a playable character in various Marvel video games created by Marvel Games including Marvel: Contest of Champions, Marvel Puzzle Quest, Marvel: Future Fight, Marvel Avengers Academy and Marvel Strike Force.

== Merchandise ==
Various toys and merchandise of Hope van Dyne have been released since her first appearance as the Wasp with director, Peyton Reed, pushing to ensure the character received equal publicity and merchandise against Scott Lang. Hot Toys released a figure of the Wasp in 2018 based on her appearance in Ant-Man and the Wasp. The figure came with interchangeable head options and other accessories. For her upgraded suit featured in Ant-Man and the Wasp: Quantumania, another figure was released. Funko also released four variants of the Wasp in her suit. For the second and third Ant-Man films, Funko released versions of the Wasp posing and flying respectively. Both versions were released with chase variants, which featured Hope in the same poses but unmasked. A keychain with a smaller version of the masked 2018 variant was also released.

Lego first released a Lego minifigure of the character in a set from 2018 based on her appearance in Antman and the Wasp (2018). This version was later re-released as a separate set exclusive to San Diego Comic-Con and came with darker wings and a bust of Giant-Man. In 2023, an updated version of the figure was released with larger wings and a helmet similar to Lang's and was included in a set of the Avengers Tower. That same year, two sets were released with a microfigure of the Wasp with the first of these being a diorama from the Avengers: Endgame (2019) final battle and the other being a counter-part to a construction figure of Ant-Man from Ant-Man and the Wasp: Quantumania (2023). Hasbro have also released Marvel Legends figures of Van Dyne's iteration of the Wasp.

== See also ==
- Characters of the Marvel Cinematic Universe
