= Evangeline Lilly =

Canadian actress (born 1979)

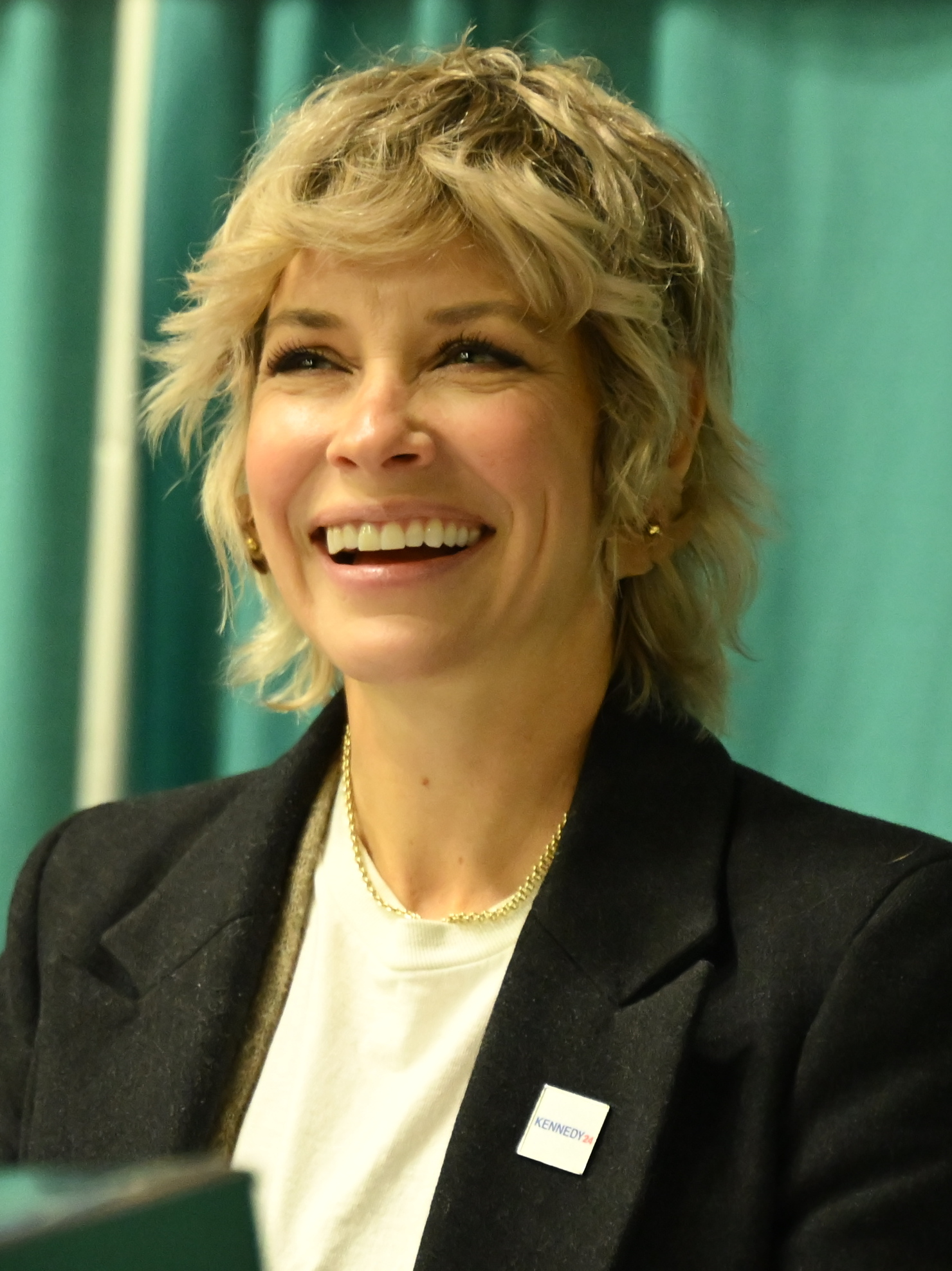
- Lilly at the 2023 GalaxyCon
- Born: Nicole Evangeline Lilly; August 3, 1979 (age 47); Fort Saskatchewan, Alberta, Canada
- Education: University of British Columbia
- Occupations: Actress; author
- Years active: 2002–present
- Spouse: Murray Hone (m. 2003; div. 2004)
- Partners: Dominic Monaghan (2004–2007); Norman Kali (2010–present)
- Children: 2

Nicole Evangeline Lilly (born August 3, 1979) is a Canadian actress and author. She gained popularity for her first leading role as Kate Austen in the ABC drama series Lost (2004–2010), which garnered her six nominations for the Saturn Award for Best Actress on Television and a nomination for the Golden Globe Award for Best Actress in a Drama Series.

Lilly has also appeared in the war film The Hurt Locker (2008) and sports drama Real Steel (2011), and starred as Tauriel in Peter Jackson's The Hobbit film series, appearing in The Desolation of Smaug (2013) and The Battle of the Five Armies (2014). She has since portrayed Hope van Dyne / Wasp in the Marvel Cinematic Universe. Lilly is the author of a children's book series The Squickerwonkers.

== Early life ==
Lilly was born in Fort Saskatchewan, Alberta, on August 3, 1979. She was raised in British Columbia by her mother, a daycare centre owner, and her father, a home economics teacher. She has an older sister and a younger sister. Lilly was raised Baptist and Mennonite.

Lilly graduated from W. J. Mouat Secondary School in Abbotsford, British Columbia, with a 4.3 GPA; she was captain of the soccer team and vice president of the student council. She attended Wilfrid Laurier University for her undergrad. In university, she was a waitress, did "oil-changes and grease-jobs on big rig trucks", and was a flight attendant for Royal Airlines to pay for her tuition. Her interest in humanitarian causes and world development led her to major in international relations at the University of British Columbia.

== Acting career ==
=== 2002–2003: Early career ===
Lilly's acting career began when she was discovered by a Ford Modelling Agency agent while passing the time in Kelowna, British Columbia. She took the agent's business card but did not immediately pursue acting. She eventually called and the agency landed her several roles in commercials and non-speaking parts in the TV shows Smallville and Kingdom Hospital. She was also a presenter on the video game news and review show The Electric Playground. Filmed in Vancouver Lilly did demonstrations for products and controllers. The series aired on the gaming television channel G4TV.

=== 2004–2007: Breakthrough with Lost ===
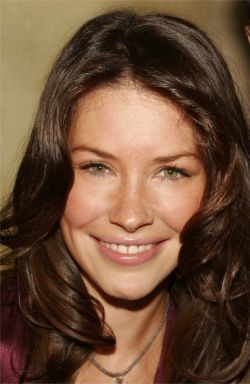
Lilly in 2007

In late 2003, Lilly was encouraged by a friend to audition for ABC's Lost, but did not expect to be cast. The secrecy campaign meant auditioning actors could not see the full script, could read only short scenes, and knew only the basic premise of people surviving a plane crash on a tropical island. It reminded Lilly of The Blue Lagoon, and she thought Lost would "at best be a mediocre TV show". Around 75 women auditioned for the part of Kate Austen. Writer and co-creator Damon Lindelof said that he and executive producer and co-creator J. J. Abrams "...were fast-forwarding through a tape and he saw her and said: 'That's the girl!'" The character almost had to be recast, as Lilly had trouble acquiring a work visa to enter the United States. Her application was finally accepted after nearly 20 tries; she arrived in Hawaii for filming one day late.

Lost ran for six seasons, from 2004 to 2010. It was one of ABC's top primetime shows, winning one Golden Globe Award and ten Primetime Emmy Awards, including Outstanding Drama Series in 2005, and was ranked the top-rated TV show of the decade by IMDb. Lilly was between 24 and 30 years of age during the show's run, appearing in 108 of 121 episodes, as her character, Kate Austen, was the show's female lead. In 2006 she was nominated for a Golden Globe Award for Best Actress – Television Series Drama. Robert Bianco of USA Today praised Lilly's performance in the episode named "Eggtown", saying it was almost worthy of a Primetime Emmy Award for Outstanding Lead Actress in a Drama Series nomination. After shooting the final episode of Lost, Lilly said she was considering taking a break from acting to focus on her charity and humanitarian efforts. She told Vulture: "I consider acting a day job—it's not my dream; it's not my be-all, end-all." She says she uses her high-profile roles to further her humanitarian efforts, not to achieve stardom.

=== 2008–2014: Established actress ===
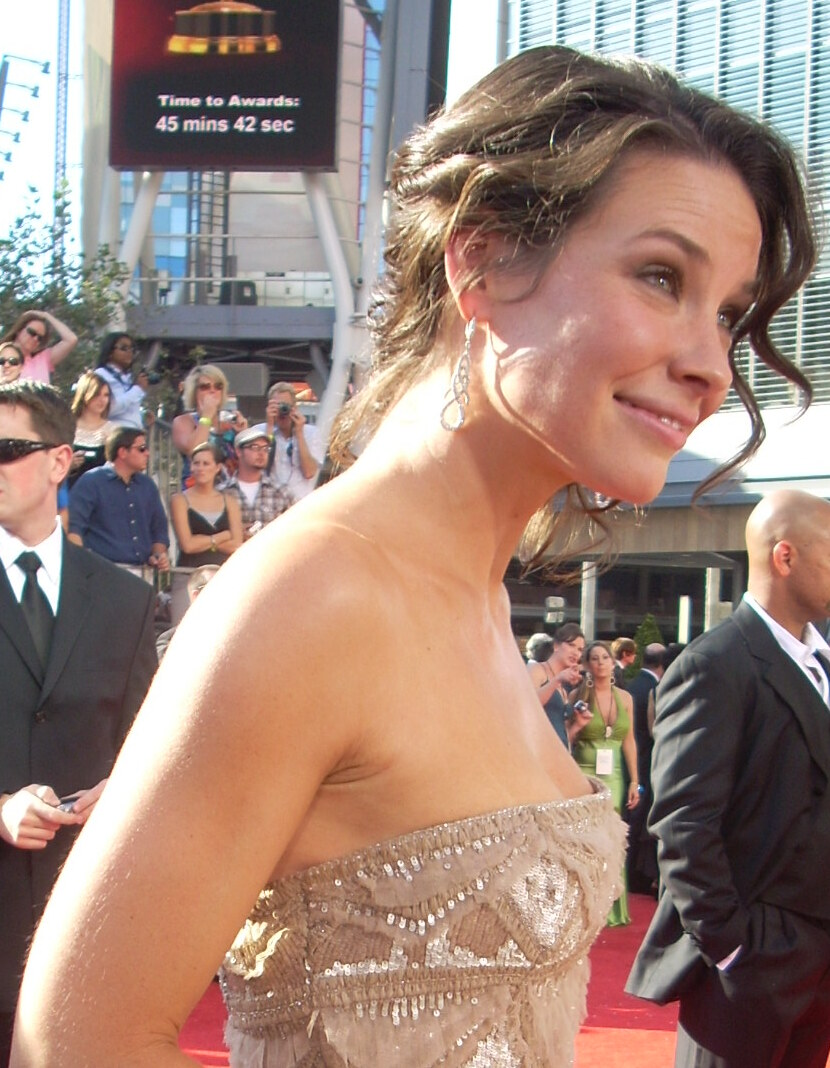
Lilly at the 60th Primetime Emmy Awards in 2008

In 2008, Lilly appeared in the film The Hurt Locker, directed by Kathryn Bigelow. The film received widespread acclaim and went on to be nominated in nine categories at the 82nd Academy Awards, winning six of these including Best Picture. Lilly and the cast won the Gotham Independent Film Award for Best Ensemble Cast and the Washington D.C. Area Film Critics Association Award for Best Ensemble. That same year, Lilly had a leading role in the psychological thriller film Afterwards.

In May 2010, Lilly announced on The View that being a mother was her top priority, but that she liked acting as a "day job" and would continue it when possible. She took a short hiatus that year and was not in contact with Hollywood.

In 2011, despite turning down a number of film offers, Lilly appeared as Bailey Tallet, a boxing gym owner, in Real Steel alongside Hugh Jackman. She accepted the role after director Shawn Levy sent her the script. Levy noted that Lilly was "magnificent to look at" and that he "needed someone who you believed had grown up in a man's world; Bailey needed to have a strength and a toughness that was not at the expense of her being womanly". Real Steel went on to be nominated for Best Visual Effects at the 84th Academy Awards. During promotion for the film, Lilly turned down a role in the X-Men franchise from Jackman, noting that she "wasn't into superhero movies" at the time.

In 2012, Lilly was cast as the Mirkwood elf Tauriel in Peter Jackson's three-part adaptation of J. R. R. Tolkien's The Hobbit. The character, which does not appear in the original book by Tolkien, was created by Peter Jackson and Fran Walsh as the head of the Elven guard. For the role, Lilly underwent training for swordplay, archery and speaking the Elvish language. Lilly described Tauriel as a nonconformist, noting that she tends to "rebel against the established social order of the Elves". Lilly appeared as the character in The Hobbit: The Desolation of Smaug (2013) and its sequel, The Hobbit: The Battle of the Five Armies (2014).

=== 2015–2023: Ant-Man films and other work ===
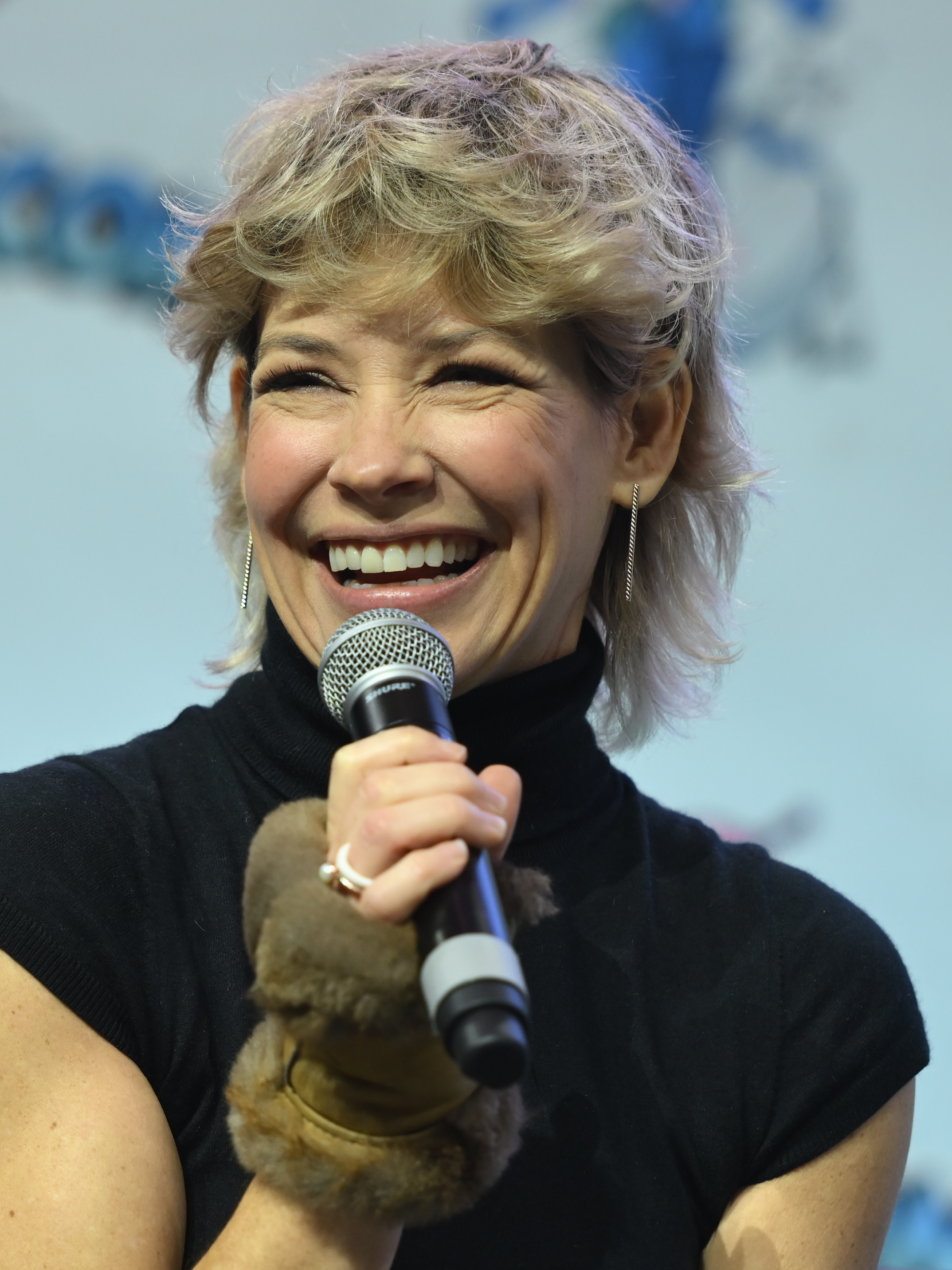
Lily at GalaxyCon in 2023

In 2015, Lilly played Hope van Dyne, the daughter of Hank Pym and Janet van Dyne, in the superhero film Ant-Man as a part of the Marvel Cinematic Universe (MCU). Lilly described her character as "capable, strong, and kick-ass", but said that being raised by two superheroes resulted in Hope being "a pretty screwed up human being [...] and the clear message sent by my name is that I'm not a big fan of my father and so I took my mother's name." Lilly also signed a multi-film contract with Marvel. The film received generally positive reviews.

In 2017, Lilly starred in the Netflix horror film Little Evil alongside Adam Scott. In 2018, she reprised her role as Van Dyne in Ant-Man and the Wasp (2018), donning the superhero mantle of the Wasp which had been teased in the first film during an end credits scene. The film received generally positive reviews with Lilly's performance being praised. The Wasp became the first superheroine to be a titular character in an MCU film. Lilly also reprised her role in Avengers: Endgame (2019). That same year, Lilly was set to star in a film titled Happy Place alongside Ike Barinholtz. (Note: As of 2024 the film has not been made.)

In 2021, she starred with Armie Hammer and Gary Oldman in Crisis, directed by Nicholas Jarecki. That same year, she also starred in South of Heaven alongside Jason Sudeikis and Mike Colter. The latter won her Best Actress at the AFIN International Film Festival. Lilly also voiced an alternate version of the Wasp in the Disney+ animated series What If...? (2021). She voiced Van Dyne in the episode "What If... Zombies?!", and received positive reviews.

In February 2023, Lilly reprised her role as Hope van Dyne / Wasp in Ant-Man and the Wasp: Quantumania, released as the first film of Phase Five of the MCU. That same month, it was announced that Lilly would voice a character in the English version of the animated historic epic Israeli film, Legend of Destruction, which was originally released in 2021 in Hebrew. Lilly voiced the "last Jewish queen, Berenice of Cilicia, who did her best to protect her people [...] even at the cost of her life", which Lilly felt was "really brutal and sad".

=== 2024–present: Hiatus ===
In June 2024, Lilly announced that she was taking an "indefinite hiatus" from acting to focus on her family. She noted that "I might return to Hollywood one day, but for now this is where I belong." That September, she made an appearance in the independent documentary film Getting Lost celebrating the twentieth anniversary of Lost. In June 2026, she narrated and executive produced an updated version of the documentary Farmacy of Light.

== In the media ==
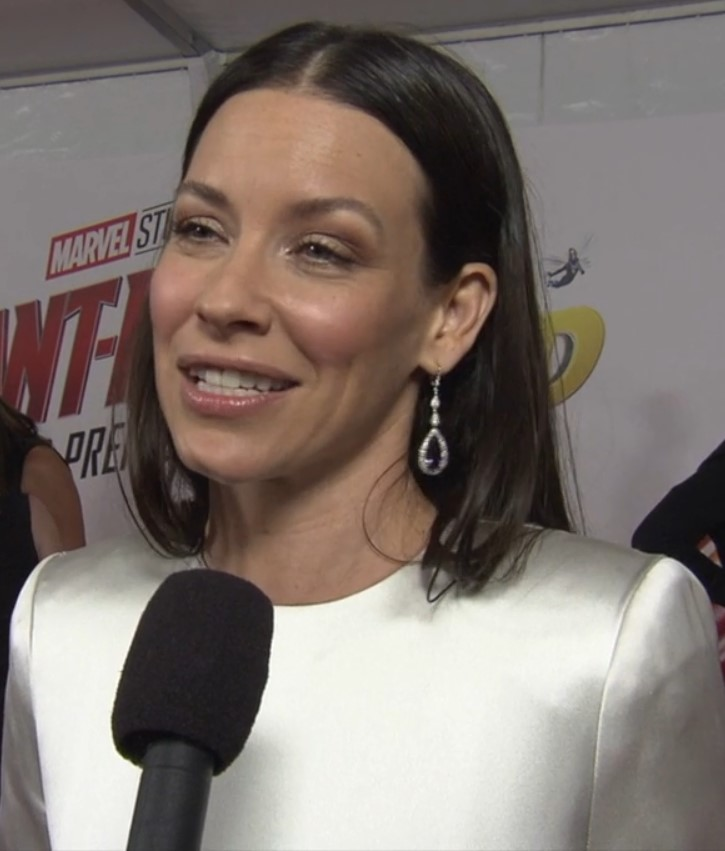
Lilly at the premiere for Ant-Man and the Wasp in 2018

=== Public image ===
After gaining recognition for her role as Kate Austen in Lost, Lilly began to appear in the media and was regularly included in "Most Beautiful" lists. Entertainment Weekly voted Lilly one of its "Breakout Stars of 2004". That same year, Lilly was voted one of People's "50 Most Beautiful People". In 2007, her portrayal of Austen was voted the number one "Sexiest Woman on Television" by TV Guide and made FHM's Top Sexiest.

Lilly is noted for playing "strong, tragic, and even a bit snarky" characters. Lilly's roles in The Hobbit film series and the Marvel Cinematic Universe as Tauriel and Hope van Dyne / Wasp respectively, have received critical acclaim. For her performance as Tauriel, Lilly was nominated for the Saturn Award for Best Supporting Actress, the Broadcast Film Critics Association Award for Best Actress in an Action Movie, the Empire Award for Best Supporting Actress, and a Kid's Choice Award for Favorite Female Buttkicker.

=== Charity work ===
Lilly has worked with various non-profit organizations such as the GO Campaign. In 2009, Lilly auctioned off custom lingerie in support of Task Brasil, "a non-profit organization dedicated to helping the lost street children of Brazil by providing them secure housing". In 2010, she auctioned off three lunches in Vancouver, Honolulu, and Los Angeles to help widows and orphans in Rwanda, a country she has made numerous trips to as part of her charity work. In 2012, Lilly auctioned off a Hawaiian hike to raise money for the Sierra Club.

== Writing ==
On set of Lost in 2006, Lilly noted in an interview that she wanted to be a writer. On July 18, 2013, Lilly debuted her book series, titled The Squickerwonkers at San Diego Comic-Con centered around a young girl who joins a group of characters described as a "family" who are all "strange outcasts" and have "very particular vices".

In 2014, Titan Books released the first title of The Squickerwonkers titled The Squickerwonkers: The Prequel (2014) with the foreword written by Peter Jackson. Three main titles were self-published by Quiet Cocoon Productions with Rodrigo Bastos Didier taking over as illustrator. The books are:

- The Squickerwonkers, Act 1: The Demise of Selma the Spoiled (2018)
- The Squickerwonkers, Act 2: The Demise of Lorna the Lazy (2018)
- The Squickerwonkers, Act 3: The Demise of Andy the Arrogant (2019)

Lilly has stated that her literary inspirations are Roald Dahl and Edward Gorey.

== Personal life ==
Lilly was raised Baptist and Mennonite and described herself as "very devout and evangelical". As of 2018, she has been involved in humanitarian work for 13 years in Rwanda where she runs an NGO.

Lilly was married to hockey player Murray Hone from 2003 to 2004. She was in a relationship with English actor and Lost costar Dominic Monaghan from 2004 to 2007. In 2010, Lilly began a relationship with Norman Kali. She gave birth to a son, in 2011. Their second son was born in October 2015.

On December 20, 2006, an electrical problem set fire to Lilly's house in Kailua, Hawaii, destroying the house and all of her possessions while she was on the set of Lost. Though she lost all of her belongings, she said that the fire was "almost liberating" and that she was "in no hurry to clutter up [her] life again".

On March 16, 2020, Lilly received mixed responses when she refused to self-quarantine during the COVID-19 pandemic, said it was "business as usual" on Instagram, and said that she values "freedom over [her] life". On March 26, she apologized for her comments and called them "dismissive, arrogant, and cryptic". On January 27, 2022, she posted a photo on Instagram showing that she had taken part in a march against COVID-19 vaccine mandates in Washington, D.C., and said that "nobody should ever be forced to inject their body with anything, against their will". On February 18, amidst the Canada convoy protest against federal COVID-19 mandates, she urged Canadian Prime Minister Justin Trudeau to meet with the protestors.

On May 30, 2025, Lilly suffered facial and head injuries after passing out and falling into a boulder. On January 2, 2026, Lilly revealed she had brain damage caused by her traumatic brain injury from the accident and is now focused on recovery.

== Filmography ==
=== Film ===
Year	Title	Role	Notes	Ref.
2003	The Lizzie McGuire Movie	Police Officer	Uncredited	
2003	Freddy vs. Jason	School Student Next to Locker	Uncredited	
2004	White Chicks	Party Guest	Uncredited	
2005	The Long Weekend	Simone		
2008	The Hurt Locker	Connie James		
2008	Afterwards	Claire		
2011	Real Steel	Bailey Tallet		
2013	The Hobbit: The Desolation of Smaug	Tauriel		
2014	The Hobbit: The Battle of the Five Armies	Tauriel		
2015	Ant-Man	Hope van Dyne		
2017	Little Evil	Samantha Bloom		
2018	Ant-Man and the Wasp	Hope van Dyne / Wasp		
2019	Avengers: Endgame	Hope van Dyne / Wasp		
2021	Crisis	Claire Reimann		
2021	Legend of Destruction	Queen Berenice	Voice; English dub	
2021	South of Heaven	Annie Ray		
2023	Ant-Man and the Wasp: Quantumania	Hope van Dyne / Wasp		
2024	Getting Lost	Herself	Documentary film	
2025	Farmacy of Light	Narrator	Voice; Documentary film	

=== Television ===
Year	Title	Role	Notes	Ref.
2002–2004	Smallville	School Girl / Girl in Cinema / Wade's Girlfriend	4 episodes	
2003	Stealing Sinatra	Model in Commercial	Television film; Uncredited	
2003	Tru Calling	Party Guest	Episode: "Morning After"	
2004	Kingdom Hospital	Benton's Girlfriend	Episode: "Heartless"	
2004–2010	Lost	Kate Austen	108 episodes	
2021	What If...?	Hope van Dyne / Wasp	Voice role; Episode: "What If... Zombies?!"	
2023	Marvel Studios: Assembled	Herself	Episode: The Making of Ant-Man and the Wasp: Quantumania	

=== Video games ===
Year	Title	Voice role	Notes
2018	Call of Duty: Black Ops 4	Savannah Mason-Meyer	

=== Theme park attractions ===
Year	Title	Role	Venue
2019	Ant-Man and The Wasp: Nano Battle!	Hope van Dyne / Wasp	Hong Kong Disneyland
2022	Avengers: Quantum Encounter	Hope van Dyne / Wasp	Disney Wish

== Accolades ==
Award	Year (Note: Indicates the year of ceremony. Each year is linked to the article about the awards held that year, wherever possible.)	Category	Work	Result	Ref.
AFIN International Film Festival	2021	Best Actress	South of Heaven	Won	
Critics' Choice Movie Awards	2014	Best Actress in an Action Movie	The Hobbit: The Desolation of Smaug	Nominated	
Empire Awards	2014	Best Supporting Actress	The Hobbit: The Desolation of Smaug	Nominated	
Golden Globe Awards	2007	Best Actress – Television Series Drama	Lost	Nominated	
Gotham Awards	2009	Best Ensemble Cast	The Hurt Locker	Won	
Kids' Choice Awards	2014	Favorite Female Buttkicker	The Hobbit: The Desolation of Smaug	Nominated	
Kids' Choice Awards	2015	Favorite Female Action Star	The Hobbit: The Battle of the Five Armies	Nominated	
MTV Movie Awards	2014	MTV Movie Award for Best Fight (shared with Orlando Bloom)	The Hobbit: The Desolation of Smaug	Won	
National Television Awards	2006	Most Popular Actress	Lost	Nominated	
Satellite Awards	2005	Best Actress – Television Series Drama	Lost	Nominated	
Saturn Awards	2005	Best Actress on Television	Lost	Nominated	
Saturn Awards	2006	Best Actress on Television	Lost	Nominated	
Saturn Awards	2007	Best Actress on Television	Lost	Nominated	
Saturn Awards	2008	Best Actress on Television	Lost	Nominated	
Saturn Awards	2009	Best Actress on Television	Lost	Nominated	
Saturn Awards	2010	Best Actress on Television	Lost	Nominated	
Saturn Awards	2015	Best Supporting Actress	The Hobbit: The Desolation of Smaug	Nominated	
Saturn Awards	2016	Best Supporting Actress	The Hobbit: The Battle of the Five Armies	Nominated	
Saturn Awards	2017	Best Supporting Actress	Ant-Man	Nominated	
Screen Actors Guild Awards	2005	Outstanding Performance by an Ensemble in a Series	Lost	Won	
Screen Actors Guild Awards	2010	Outstanding Performance by a Cast in a Motion Picture	The Hurt Locker	Nominated	
Teen Choice Awards	2005	Choice TV: Actress – Drama	Lost	Nominated	
Teen Choice Awards	2005	Choice TV: Female Breakout Star	Lost	Nominated	
Teen Choice Awards	2005	Choice TV: Chemistry (shared with Matthew Fox)	Lost	Nominated	
Teen Choice Awards	2006	Choice TV: Actress – Drama	Lost	Nominated	
Teen Choice Awards	2006	Choice TV: Chemistry (shared with Matthew Fox and Josh Holloway)	Lost	Nominated	
Teen Choice Awards	2007	Choice TV: Actress – Drama	Lost	Nominated	
Teen Choice Awards	2008	Choice TV: Actress – Drama	Lost	Nominated	
Teen Choice Awards	2010	Choice TV: Actress – Fantasy/Sci-Fi	Lost	Nominated	
Teen Choice Awards	2015	Choice Summer Movie Star: Female	Ant-Man	Nominated	
Teen Choice Awards	2019	Choice Action Movie Actress	Ant-Man and the Wasp	Nominated	
