= List of The Avengers: Earth's Mightiest Heroes episodes =

This is an episode list for The Avengers: Earth's Mightiest Heroes. The series is based on the Marvel Comics superhero team, the Avengers. The first season premiered on Disney XD in the United States on September 22, 2010. The second season premiered on April 1, 2012.

== Series overview ==
Season	Episodes	Originally aired	
Season	Episodes	First aired	Last aired
1	26	September 22, 2010	June 26, 2011
2	26	April 1, 2012	November 11, 2012

== Episodes ==
=== Season 1 (2010–11) ===
The first season premiered on September 22, 2010 with the episode "Iron Man is Born". The series took a hiatus after "The Kang Dynasty" and returned on May 15, 2011 in the United States.

The series was broadcast around the world and released on DVD in the correct chronological story order (production order). The season finale debuted in Australia on April 12, 2011, then aired on June 26, 2011 in the United States. The first half of Season 1 was released on home video on April 26, 2011, and the second half was released on October 25, 2011.

No. overall	No. in season	Title	Directed by	Written by	Original release date	Prod. code
1	1	"Iron Man is Born"	Vinton Heuck	Brandon Auman	September 22, 2010	001
After defeating Hydra's attack on the United Nations, Iron Man learns that S.H.I.E.L.D. is taking control of his technology.: Introducing characters: Iron Man, James Rhodes, Pepper Potts, J.A.R.V.I.S., MODOK, Hydra, Ultimo, Nick Fury, Maria Hill, S.H.I.E.L.D, Dreadnoughts, Jimmy Woo, Grim Reaper, Baron Strucker, Crimson Dynamo, MODOK, Technovore
2	2	"Thor the Mighty"	Vinton Heuck	Michael Ryan	September 22, 2010	002
After stopping a robbery attempt by the Wrecking Crew, Thor returns to Asgard to battle Loki and the Frost Giants.: Introducing characters: Thor, Jane Foster, Wrecking Crew (Wrecker, Thunderball, Bulldozer, Piledriver), Heimdall, Loki, Sif, Balder the Brave, Warriors Three (Fandral, Hogun, Volstagg), Odin, Ymir, Huginn and Muninn, Enchantress, Executioner
3	3	"Hulk vs the World"	Sebastian Montes	Kevin Burke & Chris Wyatt	September 29, 2010	003
Hulk battles the Absorbing Man and just as he defeats him he grabs the attention and tries not to get captured by S.H.I.E.L.D. and Hulkbuster units, while Hawkeye is betrayed by Black Widow who is apparently working for Hydra.: Introducing characters: Hulk, Thunderbolt Ross, Absorbing Man, Hawkeye, Black Widow, Hulkbusters, Abomination, Bobbi Morse, Doc Samson, Bi-Beast, U-Foes (Vector, Ironclad, Vapor, X-Ray), Leader, Madman, Radioactive Man, Zzzax
4	4	"Meet Captain America"	Sebastian Montes	Paul Giacoppo	October 6, 2010	004
Kang the Conqueror revisits a time where Captain America and Bucky took down a Hydra portal to Asgard as Kang believes Captain America is responsible for destroying his timeline.: Introducing characters: Captain America, Kang the Conqueror, Red Skull, Bucky Barnes, Abraham Erskine, Chester Phillips, James Howlett, Howling Commandos (Jack Fury, Dum Dum Dugan, Gabe Jones, Rebel Ralston, Dino Manelli, Izzy Cohen, Pinky Pinkerton), Ravonna
5	5	"The Man in the Ant Hill"	Vinton Heuck	Christopher Yost	October 13, 2010	005
Ant-Man and the Wasp take down Klaw and Whirlwind. Klaw helps M'Baku (a.k.a. the Man Ape) take down T'Chaka and become king of Wakanda. But T'Challa dons the Black Panther suit and flees to look for help.: Introducing characters: Hank Pym, Klaw, Janet van Dyne/Wasp, Ultron, Whirlwind, Clay Quartermain, Mad Thinker, Grey Gargoyle, Arnim Zola, Mandrill, Graviton, T'Challa/Black Panther, Man-Ape, T'Chaka, N'Gassi, Dora Milaje (Okoye, Nakia)
6	6	"Breakout, Part 1"	Sebastian Montes	Christopher Yost	October 20, 2010	006
A mass breakout occurs at each of the four supervillain prisons.: Introducing characters: A.I.M. (Scientist Supreme), Lucia von Bardas, Blizzard, Constrictor, Griffin, Red Ghost, Super-Apes, Living Laser, Whiplash, Chemistro, King Cobra, Wendigo, Purple Man, Baron Zemo
7	7	"Breakout, Part 2"	Vinton Heuck	Christopher Yost	October 20, 2010	007
Giant-Man, Hulk, Iron Man, Thor and Wasp band together to battle Graviton after he escapes from the Raft and targets Nick Fury.: Introducing characters: Giant-Man, LMD; Note: Based on Avengers #1, Avengers: The Origin and New Avengers #1-3.
8	8	"Some Assembly Required"	Sebastian Montes	Brandon Auman	October 27, 2010	008
Hulk is magically manipulated by the Enchantress to attack his teammates.: Note: Based on Avengers #2.
9	9	"Living Legend"	Vinton Heuck	Kevin Burke & Chris Wyatt	November 3, 2010	009
After Captain America's frozen body is discovered in the Arctic, Arnim Zola unleashes Doughboy on New York City to distract the Avengers while Baron Zemo battles Captain America.: Note: Based on Avengers #4.; Introducing characters: Doughboy, Howard Stark
10	10	"Everything is Wonderful"	Vinton Heuck	Brandon Auman	November 10, 2010	010
Enraged by Tony Stark buying out his company, Simon Williams becomes a deadly being of ionic energy, Wonder Man, in order to exact revenge. Meanwhile, Wasp and Thor chase a group of A.I.M. agents to find their secret hideout and run into another villain, MODOK.: Note: Based on Avengers #9.; Introducing characters: Wonder Man, MODOK
11	11	"Panther's Quest"	Sebastian Montes	Paul Giacoppo	November 17, 2010	011
T'Challa, the new Black Panther, meets the Avengers and tells them that his country has been overthrown by Man-Ape. As the Avengers arrive in Wakanda, not only do they have to help T'Challa reclaim his family's throne and country, but they also have to deal with Klaw, the Grim Reaper, and Hydra, who are planning to steal vibranium from Wakanda's mines.: Note: Loosely based on Avengers #52.
12	12	"Gamma World Pt. 1"	Vinton Heuck	Michael Ryan	November 26, 2010	012
The Leader has placed an expanding dome of gamma radiation around the Cube, with anyone caught inside it being mutated into a gamma monster. The Avengers, along with the support of S.H.I.E.L.D., enter the Cube in an attempt to the destroy the generator.: Introducing characters: Madame Hydra
13	13	"Gamma World Pt. 2"	Sebastian Montes	Michael Ryan	November 26, 2010	013
With most of the Avengers turned into gamma monsters, Hawkeye must convince the Hulk to help fight the Leader and the Abomination while Thor fights the Absorbing Man.
14	14	"Masters of Evil"	Sebastian Montes	Christopher Yost	December 5, 2010	014
With Abomination, Crimson Dynamo, Wonder Man, Enchantress and Executioner on his side, Baron Heinrich Zemo leads them as the Masters of Evil in a systematic takedown of the Avengers.: Note: Based on Avengers #6-7 and #274-277.
15	15	"459"	Vinton Heuck	Joelle Sellner	December 12, 2010	015
Wasp and the Avengers meet Captain Marvel and team up with him to stop a Kree Sentry from destroying the planet. Based on Fantastic Four #64 and MARVEL Super-Heroes #12: Introducing characters: Captain Marvel, Carol Danvers, Sentry-459, Yon-Rogg, Supreme Intelligence
16	16	"Widow's Sting"	Vinton Heuck	Kevin Burke & Chris Wyatt	December 19, 2010	019
Hawkeye, Captain America, Black Panther, and S.H.I.E.L.D. agent Mockingbird take on Hydra in order to find Black Widow.: Introducing characters: Mockingbird, Skrulls
17	17	"The Man Who Stole Tomorrow"	Sebastian Montes	Andrew Robinson	January 9, 2011	016
Kang the Conqueror comes from the 41st century to destroy Captain America, who Kang believes may soon cause his timeline to cease to exist.: Note: Based on Avengers #8.; Introducing characters: Fantastic Four (Mister Fantastic, Invisible Woman, Human Torch, Thing)
18	18	"Come the Conqueror"	Vinton Heuck	Eugene Son	January 16, 2011	017
The Avengers fend off Kang's invasion of Earth while Iron Man tries to locate Kang's ship.: Introducing characters: Black Knight, Jasper Sitwell
19	19	"The Kang Dynasty"	Sebastian Montes	Brian Reed	January 23, 2011	018
The Avengers attack Kang's ship with the help of the last of the Ultrons.: Note: Based on Avengers: Kang Dynasty; Introducing characters: H.E.R.B.I.E.
20	20	"The Casket of Ancient Winters"	Sebastian Montes	Paul Giacoppo	April 4, 2011 (Australia); May 15, 2011 (United States)	020
The Avengers must stop Malekith the Accursed after he obtains the Casket of Ancient Winters.: Note: Based on Avengers #249; Introducing characters: Dark Elves (Malekith)
21	21	"Hail, Hydra!"	Vinton Heuck	Kevin Burke & Chris Wyatt	April 5, 2011 (Australia); May 22, 2011 (United States)	021
The Black Widow requests the Avengers' help in retrieving the Cosmic Cube before A.I.M. and Hydra tear the world apart fighting over it.
22	22	"Ultron-5"	Sebastian Montes	Brandon Auman	April 6, 2011 (Australia); May 29, 2011 (United States)	022
Ant-Man, tired of the unending violence, quits the team while Ultron attempts to bring about peace.: Introducing characters: Serpent Society (Anaconda, Bushmaster, Death Adder, Rattler)
23	23	"The Ultron Imperative"	Vinton Heuck	Brandon Auman	April 7, 2011 (Australia); June 5, 2011 (United States)	023
Ultron has transcended his body, and has taken over the world's technology systems.
24	24	"This Hostage Earth"	Sebastian Montes	Michael Ryan	April 8, 2011 (Australia); June 12, 2011 (United States)	024
The Masters of Evil (now joined by Chemistro, the Grey Gargoyle, and the Living Laser) prepare for a full-scale invasion of Earth...and unless the Avengers can stop them, the legions of the Nine Realms are coming to Earth.: Introducing characters: Karnilla
25	25	"The Fall of Asgard"	Vinton Heuck	Christopher Yost	April 11, 2011 (Australia); June 19, 2011 (United States)	025
Lost and separated, the Avengers struggle to survive in the Nine Realms.: Introducing characters: Hela, Ulik, Dwarves (Eitri), Light Elves (Faradei), Valkyrie
26	26	"A Day Unlike Any Other"	Sebastian Montes	Christopher Yost	April 12, 2011 (Australia); June 26, 2011 (United States)	026
The Avengers battle Loki in Asgard as the other realms fall.: Introducing characters: Hoarfen, Midgard Serpent, Pitt'o Nili

=== Season 2 (2012) ===
Marvel Animation and Disney XD later confirmed a second season of the series. The first episode was publicly shown at the 2011 San Diego Comic-Con in June 2011 and again at New York Comic-Con in October 2011 before its television broadcast.

No. overall	No. in season	Title	Directed by	Written by	Original release date	Prod. code
27	1	"The Private War of Doctor Doom"	Gary Hartle	Christopher Yost	April 1, 2012	027
Doctor Doom's forces attacks the Avengers and the Fantastic Four where they must fight to save New York City, capturing the Wasp and the Invisible Woman.: Note: Based on Avengers #25 and Avengers #154-156.; Introducing characters: Doctor Doom, Criti Noll
28	2	"Alone Against A.I.M."	Boyd Kirkland	Kevin Burke & Chris Wyatt	April 8, 2012	028
A.I.M.'s Scientist Supreme unleashes Technovore, providing a distraction for an armorless Tony Stark while the A.I.M. agents fight Black Panther, Captain America, and War Machine in an attempt to steal Stark Industries' technology.: Introducing characters: War Machine
29	3	"Acts of Vengeance"	Roy Burdine	Michael Ryan	April 15, 2012	029
The Enchantress seeks revenge on Baron Zemo and the Masters of Evil for betraying her, and the remaining supervillains go to the Avengers for protection. Meanwhile, Thor learns of a crisis tying with the return of the Fire Demon Surtur which concerns the Nine Realms.: Introducing characters: Surtur
30	4	"Welcome to the Kree Empire"	Boyd Kirkland	Paul Giacoppo	April 22, 2012	030
A Kree ship led by Ronan the Accuser arrives and attacks a S.W.O.R.D. ship. While Abigail Brand fights the Kree soldiers in space, the Avengers are assisted by Ms. Marvel in fighting Ronan and an army of Kree soldiers on Earth.: Introducing characters: Ms. Marvel, Ronan the Accuser, Abigail Brand, Henry Peter Gyrich, Sydren, Kalum Lo
31	5	"To Steal an Ant-Man"	Roy Burdine	Brandon Auman	April 29, 2012	031
When Hank Pym's Ant-Man/Giant-Man suit is stolen, he enlists the Heroes for Hire to find the thief, but Pym soon learns that it is not a common robbery.: Note: Based on MARVEL Premiere #47.; Introducing characters: Luke Cage, Iron Fist, Scott Lang/Ant-Man, Cassie Lang, Crossfire, Señor Muerte, Spear, Mangler, Gideon Mace, Cockroach Hamilton, Big Ben Donovan, Piranha Jones, Scythe
32	6	"Michael Korvac"	Boyd Kirkland	Dan Abnett & Andy Lanning	May 6, 2012	032
When a mysterious man known as Michael Korvac is discovered, the Avengers must figure out exactly what happened to him - all while defending him from the Guardians of the Galaxy.: Introducing characters: Michael Korvac, Guardians of the Galaxy (Star-Lord, Adam Warlock, Groot, Rocket Raccoon, Quasar), Corrina Korvac; 'Note: This episode was dedicated to Boyd Kirkland, who died in 2011.
33	7	"Who Do You Trust?"	Gary Hartle	Brian Reed	May 13, 2012	034
Nick Fury returns, having assembled a team of heroes in secret (himself, Black Widow, Mockingbird, and Quake) to gather information about the impending Skrull invasion of Earth.: Introducing characters: Quake, Veranke
34	8	"The Ballad of Beta Ray Bill"	Steve Gordon	Michael Ryan	May 20, 2012	033
Thor is attacked by a powerful creature known as Beta Ray Bill - who proves himself just as able to lift and wield Mjölnir. Thor and Sif soon finds themselves allying with this strange warrior (who apparently has his own reasons for disliking Surtur) to save all of Asgard from being burned to the ground by Surtur.: Note: Based on Thor #337-338.; Introducing characters: Beta Ray Bill
35	9	"Nightmare in Red"	Boyd Kirkland	Mark Parsons	May 30, 2012 (Australia); June 17, 2012 (United States)	036
A mysterious red-skinned Hulk attacks the S.H.I.E.L.D. Helicarrier. While Wasp and Captain America fight Red Hulk (who Maria Hill believes is the Hulk gone rogue), Hawkeye attempts to protect Bruce Banner, who is off duty for the day. During the battle, Red Hulk flees to avoid having his identity exposed. The Hulkbusters corner Captain America and Hulk, who chooses to surrender and be imprisoned rather than fight them and risk damaging his reputation further. Meanwhile, Captain America reports to Veranke and is revealed to be a Skrull imposter.: Note: Based on Hulk Vol. 2 #1-6.; Introducing characters: Red Hulk, Falcon, Glenn Talbot, Winter Soldier
36	10	"Prisoner of War"	Steve Gordon	Kevin Burke & Chris Wyatt	May 31, 2012 (Australia); June 24, 2012 (United States)	038
After being a prisoner of the Skrulls for months, Captain America teams up with other prisoners, including some of his enemies, to escape. But in order to do so, they must first get past the mighty Super-Skrull.: Introducing characters: Galactus, Super-Skrull, Dro'ge, Skragg, X'iv
37	11	"Infiltration"	Roy Burdine	Christopher Yost	June 4, 2012 (Australia); July 1, 2012 (United States)	037
The Skrulls' invasion of Earth has begun - and Wakanda is the first target. Ms. Marvel comes to the rescue, but must deal with both a stubborn Black Panther and a team of Skrulls posing as the Avengers.: Note: Based on Secret Invasion #1-4.
38	12	"Secret Invasion"	Boyd Kirkland	Christopher Yost	June 5, 2012 (Australia); July 8, 2012 (United States)	039
The Skrulls have invaded the entire planet and are using Captain America's position of respect to convince the humans to submit. When Hawkeye, Wasp, and Ms. Marvel are captured by Veranke's army of Super-Skrulls, all seems lost - until Iron Man and Thor are reunited with the real Captain America in a last-ditch effort to drive back the Skrull onslaught and save Earth.: Note: Based on Secret Invasion #5-8 and Secret Invasion: Fantastic Four #1-3.; Introducing characters: Rl'nnd
39	13	"Along Came a Spider..."	Roy Burdine	Christopher Yost	June 6, 2012 (Australia); July 15, 2012 (United States)	042
Captain America teams up with the equally mistrusted Spider-Man to fight the Serpent Society when they try to rescue Viper and King Cobra from S.H.I.E.L.D. custody.: Introducing characters: Spider-Man, J. Jonah Jameson, Robbie Robertson, Betty Brant
40	14	"Behold...The Vision!"	Roy Burdine	Michael Ryan	June 7, 2012 (Australia); July 22, 2012 (United States)	035
With Thor and Hawkeye in tow, Captain America travels to Wakanda to have his shield repaired and to persuade Black Panther to rejoin the team. But a mysterious figure known only as the Vision arrives to steal the shield and Wakanda's supply of vibranium.: Note: Based in part on Avengers #57.; Introducing characters: Vision, Professor Thorton, Malcolm Colcord
41	15	"Powerless"	Steve Gordon	Man of Action & Danielle Wolff	June 11, 2012 (Australia); July 29, 2012 (United States)	044
The Enchantress offers Loki a chance to exact his revenge on Thor and the Avengers for thwarting his conquest of the Nine Realms, and uses a spell to strip Thor, Captain America, and Iron Man of their powers. Now, the helpless heroes must defeat Loki - his soul now in command of a powerful Asgardian weapon known as the Destroyer - without their abilities.: Introducing characters: Destroyer, Donald Blake
42	16	"Assault on 42"	Steve Gordon	Brian Reed	June 12, 2012 (Australia); August 5, 2012 (United States)	040
Stranded in the Negative Zone, the Avengers must join forces with their enemies - including former members of the Masters of Evil - to fight off Annihilus and his army of monsters.: Introducing characters: Annihilus
43	17	"Ultron Unlimited"	Roy Burdine	Christopher Yost	June 13, 2012 (Australia); August 19, 2012 (United States)	041
The Avengers are ambushed and captured, one by one, by Ultron's team of synthezoid Avengers as part of his plan to rid the world of "flawed" humans, perfect himself, and construct a mate.: Note: Based on Avengers Vol 3 #0, #19-22; Introducing characters: Jocasta
44	18	"Yellowjacket"	Boyd Kirkland	Man of Action & James Felder	June 14, 2012 (Australia); September 9, 2012 (United States)	043
A mysterious explosion seemingly kills Hank Pym in his college laboratory, but as the Avengers and their friends mourn the loss of their fallen comrade-in-arms, a fearless new vigilante named Yellowjacket - endowed with the same powers and technology as Ant-Man/Giant-Man and Wasp - begins taking out the members of the Serpent Society.: Introducing characters: Yellowjacket
45	19	"Emperor Stark"	Boyd Kirkland	Christopher Yost	June 18, 2012 (Australia); September 16, 2012 (United States)	045
The Vision awakens after a month of repairs to find that Tony Stark and his fellow Avengers have taken over the world. With the whole planet turned against him, the Vision must get to the bottom of Stark's "utopia" - only to discover an unlikely figure to be the true power behind the Avengers' throne.: Note: Based on the 1987 Marvel graphic novel Emperor Doom.; Introducing characters: Purple Man
46	20	"Code Red"	Roy Burdine	Man of Action	June 19, 2012 (Australia); September 23, 2012 (United States)	046
Strange fumes sicken all of the Avengers - save for Iron Man, whose suit of armor provides him with protection.: Note: Based on Avengers: Red Zone.
47	21	"Winter Soldier"	Boyd Kirkland	Man of Action & James Felder	June 20, 2012 (Australia); September 30, 2012 (United States)	047
Captain America ponders the mystery of the Winter Soldier and enlists Nick Fury's aid to find him when the Red Skull escapes from prison and massive robots - the Sleepers - arise as part of a contingency plan by the founder of Hydra to destroy Washington, D.C.: Note: Based on Captain America (vol. 5) #8-14.; Introducing characters: Valentina Allegra de Fontaine
48	22	"The Deadliest Man Alive"	Steve Gordon	Man of Action	June 21, 2012 (Australia); October 7, 2012 (United States)	048
When the Hulk's name is cleared of the crimes committed by the Red Hulk, the Avengers find that the deception put forth by Captain America's Skrull doppelganger has made him even more of a loose cannon than before. Meanwhile, Red Hulk joins the Avengers, wanting to repent for his actions under the Red Skull's control. However, he confronts Captain America after he attempts to free Bruce Banner from prison, revealing that he was framing Hulk to make himself look like a hero. Iron Man subdues Red Hulk with a nanite formula, revealing him to be Thunderbolt Ross, who is imprisoned.
49	23	"New Avengers"	Steve Gordon	Christopher Yost	June 25, 2012 (Australia); October 14, 2012 (United States)	050
Kang the Conqueror is freed from prison by his alternate timeline doppelgangers and attempts to conquer the world once again, this time trapping the Avengers in a temporal void to keep them from getting in the way of his plans. Now a new team of heroes (Spider-Man, War Machine, Wolverine, Iron Fist, Luke Cage, and the Thing) must band together to stop the cross-temporal onslaught.: Introducing characters: Wolverine, Council of Cross-Time Kangs
50	24	"Operation Galactic Storm"	Boyd Kirkland	Christopher Yost	June 26, 2012 (Australia); October 21, 2012 (United States)	049
The Kree attempt to create a wormhole connecting Earth's solar system with their galaxy, which will consequently destroy the Sun and all life on Earth - just as Kang the Conqueror predicted. The Avengers and Captain Marvel head into space to stop it.: Note: Based on Operation: Galactic Storm; Introducing characters: Peter Corbeau
51	25	"Live Kree or Die"	Steve Gordon	Christopher Yost	June 27, 2012 (Australia); November 4, 2012 (United States)	051
The Avengers arrive on the Kree homeworld of Hala, but find that they are not welcome there - even with Captain Marvel on their side.: Introducing characters: Supreme Intelligence
52	26	"Avengers Assemble!"	Roy Burdine	Christopher Yost	June 28, 2012 (Australia); November 11, 2012 (United States)	052
The Avengers must bring forth an army of nearly all their allies to face their greatest challenge yet - Galactus, the devourer of worlds, and his quartet of heralds drawn from the elements of nature. Galactus sends his heralds to oversee the construction of devices around the world to aid him in consuming Earth. The Avengers then call their allies, splitting up into five different teams to destroy the Heralds. Galactus attempts to destroy Earth by himself, but is transported to the Negative Zone, where he can consume energy infinitely and no longer be a threat.: Introducing characters: Heralds of Galactus (Air-Walker, Firelord, Stardust, Terrax)
