= List of Iron Man: Armored Adventures episodes =

The Marvel Animation television series Iron Man: Armored Adventures is based on Iron Man, the Marvel Comics character. The series began regular broadcasts on April 24, 2009. In Australia, where the series aired on ABC, some episodes were aired before the US and Canadian broadcasts.

Additionally, international broadcast begins with the opening credits, which are followed by the episodes in their entirety, whereas in the North American airings the teaser precedes the opening credits.

== Series overview ==
Season	Episodes	Originally released	
Season	Episodes	First released	Last released
1	26	April 24, 2009	January 18, 2010
2	26	July 13, 2011	July 25, 2012

== Episodes ==
=== Season 1 (2009–10) ===
No. in season	Title	Story by	Written by	American air date	Australian air date	Canadian air date	Prod. code
1	"Iron, Forged in Fire: Part 1"	Romain Van Liemt, Craig Kyle, Christopher Yost	Christopher Yost	April 24, 2009	May 13, 2009	April 12, 2009 (Note: This episode was first released on the Teletoon and Sneak peek channel on November 22, 2008.)	101
Inventor Howard Stark seemingly dies in a plane crash while investigating an ancient Chinese "Makluan ring". His son, Tony Stark, barely survives the crash when the armored exoskeleton-battle suit which Tony designed and built himself implants in his chest a device to sustain his damaged heart. Obadiah Stane takes control of Howard's company, Stark International, and begins weaponizing Stark's inventions. Tony moves in with family friend James "Rhodey" Rhodes and his mother, Roberta, and begins attending school. There, he meets classmate Pepper Potts who informs Tony that Stane is under investigation by the FBI for possible involvement in Howard's death. When Tony goes to investigate in his armor, he ends up preventing a runaway train from crashing into Stark Tower; the media calls him Iron Man. A shadowy figure called the Mandarin, wearing a second Makluan ring, vows to obtain the ring in Stane's possession.
2	"Iron, Forged in Fire: Part 2"	Romain Van Liemt, Craig Kyle, Christopher Yost	Christopher Yost	April 24, 2009	May 13, 2009	April 12, 2009 (Note: This episode was first released on the Teletoon and Sneak peek channel on November 22, 2008.)	102
The Mandarin, shown to be an old man named Zhang, quarrels with his stepson Gene Khan. When Stane demonstrates his weaponized version of Tony's "Earth Mover" invention to a group of potential buyers, Tony, as Iron Man, destroys them. Meanwhile, Gene, having imprisoned Zhang, appears as the Mandarin and takes Stane's ring.
3	"Secrets and Lies"	TBA	Alexx Van Dyne	May 1, 2009	May 18, 2009	April 19, 2009	103
As tensions mount between the Tong and rival criminal organization the Maggia, Gene enrolls in the Tomorrow Academy to be closer to Tony in hopes of learning more about the Makluan rings. When a team of Maggia thugs headed by Unicorn and Killer Shrike kidnap Gene, Tony, and Pepper, Rhodey remotely pilots the Iron Man armor to rescue them.
4	"Cold War"	TBA	Eugene Son	May 8, 2009	May 15, 2009	April 26, 2009	104
In hopes of exposing Stane as evil, Tony teams up with Blizzard, until he realizes that Blizzard wants to hurt Stane along with anyone else who gets in his way. As Iron Man, Tony reluctantly saves Stane, leaving Blizzard cryogenically frozen in Stark Tower.
5	"Whiplash"	TBA	Paul Giacoppo	May 15, 2009	May 19, 2009	May 3, 2009	105
Whiplash seriously injures Pepper's father, who is close to finding Mr. Fix. When Fix sends Whiplash after Pepper, Tony saves her, and reveals to her his identity as Iron Man. Iron Man defeats Whiplash by using a new, more powerful suit of armor to hurl Whiplash into an electrical transformer.
6	"Iron Man vs. the Crimson Dynamo"	Brandon Auman	TBA	May 22, 2009	May 20, 2009	May 10, 2009	106
Two years ago, an astronaut named Ivan Vanko was lost in space while observing the Sun. In the present, he crashes back to Earth in New York City, having survived thanks to his Crimson Dynamo suit. But after years in space, Vanko desires revenge against the people who left him behind: Project Pegasus. Iron Man is hard timed trying to fight the tough suit and decides to use brains over brawn. But as he ran low on energy, Pepper is able to locate Vanko's family and resolve the matter peacefully.
7	"Meltdown"	TBA	Eugene Son	May 22, 2009	December 12, 2009	November 22, 2009	107
Tony is still flunking school and is placed in the lead role of Hamlet (which ironically mirrors his situation). He learns from a holographic will of his father that he wanted him to have a normal life rather than letting the company be a burden on him. However, a Maggia member named Arthur Parks becomes the Living Laser through use of an experimental vest stolen during a raid. Iron Man is able to stop him and remove the vest but it had a lasting effect on the Laser, whose body turned to pure energy and resolves to take down Iron Man.
8	"Field Trip"	TBA	Len Uhley	May 29, 2009	May 21, 2009	May 17, 2009	108
While sneaking into Stark Industries, Tony's Stealth Armor shorts out, forcing him to leave it in his father's vault which to his dismay has been stripped clean. To retrieve the armor before Stane can find it, Tony, Rhodey and Pepper set up with a school field trip to smuggle in replacement power cells. However with Tony barred from the building, it is up to Rhodey and Pepper to save the day.
9	"Ancient History 101"	TBA	Alexx Van Dyne	June 5, 2009	May 22, 2009	May 24, 2009	109
Tony, his friends and Gene search the ancient ruins where his father first found one of the Makluan Rings and discover a carving explaining the history of the rings and that for each one there is a test established by the first Mandarin intended to determine the worthiness of his heirs and activate to each ring's power. In this case the test being one of wisdom, Gene assumes the key lies in choosing a book over a sword, but this only ends up bringing stone Dreadknight statues to life and splitting the group. Knocking Rhodey unconscious, Gene attempts to defeat the statues as the Mandarin but it is Tony and Pepper who realize the sword is the key to passing the test. After escaping the collapsing temple, they discover the sword contains a map to the next ring.
10	"Ready, A.I.M., Fire"	TBA	Kevin Burke, Chris "Doc" Wyatt	July 24, 2009	May 25, 2009	May 31, 2009	110
At a school science fair, Tony is approached by the Controller on behalf of A.I.M. and tricked into making a mind/machine interface work. The head of A.I.M., angered that this may compromise their MODOK project orders all efforts on the interface to cease and Tony and the others exterminated. However, Tony has already been successful, allowing the Controller to take over his friends. Now Iron Man must step in and save the day, only to find his life being saved in the process by a girl named Whitney, who is revealed to be the daughter of his greatest enemy.
11	"Seeing Red"	TBA	Christopher Yost	August 7, 2009	May 26, 2009	June 7, 2009	111
Rhodey becomes concerned over Tony's plans to increasingly weaponize the Iron Man armor using reverse engineered captured tech. Obadiah Stane offers to bail out Anton Harkov and Project Pegasus in return for the Crimson Dynamo armor which is upgraded to capture Iron Man, resulting in a pitched battle in the middle of the city that leaves Stane furious at the reckless endangerment of innocent lives. Having lost the battle and fallen unconscious, Tony is brought to Project Pegasus. Harkov and Stane then begin to analyze the Iron Man armor. With the help of Rhodey and Pepper, Tony manages to escape, only to return in the Dynamo Buster armor (which resembles the Hulkbuster Armor). He then uses a virus called Technovore to destroy Pegasus' advanced AI Delphi, both to defeat the Dynamo and prevent Stane from acquiring detailed technical data on Iron Man. Tony is excited that he finally defeat one of his enemies, saying that what they need to win is better tech, weapons, and to stay ahead. Rhodey, on the other hand, reminds Tony that there is a line between good and evil, and that he just came close to crossing it. Though successful, there is an unexpected consequence, back at Project Pegasus having consumed all available data, the Technovore is close to burning itself out just as Tony planned. When Obadiah Stane is informed by his secretary that Anton Harkov is on the other line, Obadiah has her tell Anton Harkov that the offer is rescinded. But unknown to Tony one of Pegasus' projects were computer-controlled nano-mites. Using the connection, Technovore takes control of the Nano-mites and forms a body.
12	"Masquerade"	TBA	Brandon Auman	July 31, 2009	May 27, 2009	June 14, 2009	112
When Obadiah starts acting strangely, Iron Man investigates and discovers that "Obadiah" is being impersonated by a villain named Madame Masque. When she sets her sights on Iron Man, she begins to frame Iron Man of various crimes. It is revealed that Masque is actually Stane's own daughter, Whitney, using a stolen invention of Stark's deceased father to strike out at her own for neglecting her.
13	"Hide and Seek"	TBA	Ken Pontac	August 14, 2009	May 28, 2009	June 21, 2009	113
Tony and Gene team up to recover the third Makluan Ring, making Rhodey and Pepper furious at being left out even though Tony did so to protect them. When trying to claim the ring, Gene ends up awakening the ring's ancient robot guardian Ultimo. When Tony and his friends decipher the solution to the test of Courage, the Mandarin appears to reclaim his prize.
14	"Man and Iron Man"	Sean Ryan	Thomas Barichella	August 21, 2009	May 29, 2009	June 28, 2009	114
Tony upgrades the Iron Man exoskeleton software, and proceeds without testing it to clash with a newly equipped Whiplash, who now has a disc and better chains, courtesy of Mr. Fix. A momentary relapse in the armor's functionality is ignored, but makes critical changes to his suit. The suit has the ability to detect enemy power signatures, and when Tony attempts to find, and not fight, Mr. Fix, the armor displays sentient ability, putting itself into attack mode. It easily overpowers Whiplash with perfect maneuvering, and to the horror of Tony, destroys the facility that Mr. Fix occupied. Thinking that the Iron Man armor killed Mr. Fix and Whiplash, Tony and Rhodey decide that the armor needs to be taken care of, and the suit craftily lures Tony away, then attacks Rhodey. The armor decides that Tony's danger-seeking behavior is not healthy for him, and tells Tony that he is to be confined within the armor at all times. Tony resists, and damages the armor. Rhodey grabs a magnetic repulsor, and Tony jumps in the way of the blast the armor directs at Rhodey. Tony goes into cardiac arrest, and the armor sacrifices itself to save him.
15	"Panther's Prey"	Andrew Robinson	Cyril Tysz	August 28, 2009	December 26, 2009	January 17, 2010	115
Iron Man is tracking an international thief named Moses Magnum right to AIM's secret headquarters, but the Black Panther is after Magnum as well. Magnum stole something that belongs to the Panther, and the Panther aims to get it back, even if he has to go through Iron Man to do it. It is later revealed that Magnum had stolen Vibranium from Wakanda and killed the Panther's father T'Chaka in a revolt. The Panther eventually acknowledges that allowing other people to help him might be a better way to operate than keeping Wakanda's borders forever closed, as it might have saved his father's life if it had been done earlier, once Iron Man saves his life.
16	"Fun with Lasers"	Eugene Son	Thomas Barichella	September 4, 2009	December 26, 2009	January 24, 2010	116
The Living Laser takes over a space satellite and threatens Earth. When Iron Man tries to stop him, he runs into Nick Fury and S.H.I.E.L.D. who inform Iron Man not to get involved, even though he is putting his agents at risk. Iron Man flies to space to fight the Laser, but Fury gives him a 20-minute window in which to defuse the situation before he sets a self-destruct in the station off to prevent the Laser from destroying New York. Iron Man eventually tricks the Laser into capturing himself and S.H.I.E.L.D. takes him into custody, Fury threatening to destroy Iron Man if he ever "does more harm than good."
17	"Chasing Ghosts"	Brandon Auman	Thomas Barichella	September 18, 2009	January 2, 2010	January 31, 2010	117
A hit has been placed on Tony Stark, and the Ghost has come to collect. Tony cannot even see the invisible and untouchable Ghost coming, but Madame Masque protects him. And while Madame Masque battles the Ghost to protect Tony, Tony finds himself pushing away Rhodey and Pepper to protect them. But when Whitney is captured by the Ghost, Tony has to turn to the very best friends he pushed away for help. When Iron Man confronts Ghost, he tells him it was stupid of Ghost capturing Obadiah Stane's daughter, Whitney, and realizing that he was not hired by him. Eventually, Whitney pays the Ghost off to stop hunting Tony.
18	"Pepper, Interrupted"	Alexx Van Dyne	Julien Magnat	September 25, 2009	January 2, 2010	February 7, 2010	118
Pepper realizes if she wants to keep Tony as a friend, she has to learn to start liking Gene Khan, who has been busy trying to negotiate peace as the Mandarin between his Tong forces and the Maggia. Pepper ends up in the middle of the conflict. In order save Pepper from Count Nefaria and the Black Knight, without revealing his secret, Gene calls Iron Man. When Iron Man interrupts the meeting, the Tong and the Maggia fight, leaving Iron Man against Black Knight. In the end, Gene saves Pepper, Count Nefaria and Black Knight got arrested and the Tong soldiers find out that the man they've been following is not the Mandarin.
19	"Technovore"	Christopher Yost	Julien Magnat	October 9, 2009	January 2, 2010	February 14, 2010	119
The Technovore virus that Tony unleashed against Project Pegasus didn't burn out as intended. It has acquired the nanotechnology and is running loose in the Project Pegasus complex, assimilating any technology it can gets its hands on. It has taken on the shape of a robot, which bears resemblance to Spider-Man villain, Carnage. Meanwhile, Nick Fury sends some S.H.I.E.L.D. Agents to bring Tony to repair the S.H.I.E.L.D. Helicarrier's engines. It is also revealed that the Living Laser is dying and that S.H.I.E.L.D. intends to let him waste away as he was a villain. Rhodey goes to the Pegasus facility to check out a disturbance only to run into Technovore, when it gets a hold of Rhody's earpiece, it calls Tony so it can absorb the Iron Man armor. After the Pegasus scientist who was hiding in the building fled, Tony arrives. After exhausting every option, Tony activates the armor's self-destruct sequence, and abandoned the armor and ran for it. The explosion destroys both Technovore and the facility. Meanwhile somewhere in Russia, Anton Harkov leaves a plane. But unknown to him, a microscopic cell of Technovore's nanomite body still remains inside the fabric of his coat. Note: Beginning with this episode, this episode began to air on NickToons (formerly called Nicktoons Network).
20	"World on Fire"	Ken Pontac	Thomas Barichella	October 16, 2009	January 2, 2010	February 21, 2010	120
The fourth Makluan Ring has been found, and when Tony, Rhodey and Pepper rush off to collect it, Gene is left behind. And while Gene tries to track down his 'friends,' he's left alone with memories of his mother, the person who introduced him to his destiny, his birthright: the Makluan Rings. Actually claiming that birthright isn't so easy though, which Tony is finding out first hand. He's facing the fourth Guardian: the Firebrand, which possesses Pepper and Rhodey and attempts to erupt volcanoes all over the world. Rhodey and Tony pass the test with Gene's help and activating the ring. They arrive back home, as Tony has the ring on and cannot get it to do anything, but the Mandarin could.
21	"Designed Only for Chaos"	Eugene Son	Thomas Barichella	October 23, 2009	January 9, 2010	February 28, 2010	121
The Living Laser is dying, and Tony Stark is trying to save his life. But fate has other plans. The Ghost has been hired by AIM to 'steal' the Laser. When the Ghost comes Tony realizes that it was AIM who hired the Ghost to kill him. AIM needs him to be a power source for their greatest creation, and when Iron Man arrives to rescue the Laser, he's too late. The Mental Organism Designed Only for Conquest is online. Not even Iron Man can withstand MODOK's mental power and MODOK immediately brings Iron Man to his knees and takes information from him, including his secret identity. When the Living Laser hears MODOK said that Tony is Iron Man he realizes that Iron Man had been trying to help him the whole time. Then he joins the fight just as MODOK is about to finish Iron Man and working together the two overpower MODOK and cause his memory system to crash so he forgets all the information he took from Iron Man. But after battle it becomes too late to save the Laser, Iron Man thanks the redeemed Living Laser for saving him and then he disappears. Meanwhile Tony loses faith in his father after learning from Nick Fury that he made weapons for S.H.I.E.L.D. but Roberta Rhodes reveals that Howard gave up making weapons and started helping people when Tony was born just to become "someone his son could be proud of" which restores Tony's belief in his father.
22	"Don't Worry, Be Happy"	Julien Magnat	Andrew Robinson	November 13, 2009	January 9, 2010	March 7, 2010	122
In Gene's limo, Gene, Pepper, Whitney, and Happy follow Iron Man (actually Rhodey, reluctantly trying the suit on Tony's insistence) until he crashes. Rhodey abandons the suit, and Happy, finding it empty, puts it on. Tony tries to convince, then force, Happy to stop playing around, but Happy refuses, believing that he is communicating with the "robot" Iron Man. When Happy crashes into a Tong treasury building, he finds Unicorn and Killer Shrike arming explosives to blow open the vault. Gene, as the Mandarin, protects Iron Man from Tong "ninja" troops, cementing their suspicions that he is an imposter. Whitney, as Madame Masque, slows the police response to the situation. After a struggle, the villains admit they are working for Mr. Fix, and Tony realizes that the bombs are powerful enough to destroy the city. When Tony fails to defuse them, Happy saves the day by simply breaking the central bomb in half; meanwhile, Madame Masque, as Gene, convinces Pepper to run to safety. Finally, Happy takes off the suit when Tony claims that it is about to explode.
23	"Uncontrollable"	Brandon Auman	Thomas Barichella	November 20, 2009	January 9, 2010	March 14, 2010	123
When Tony responds to the Hulk's rampage in the Dynamo Buster armor, the Controller takes control of him to attack AIM. The Controller had been manipulating Rick Jones, friend of the Hulk, to the same end. The Hulk agrees to help save Iron Man, and finds him at AIM headquarters struggling against the Controller's attempts to force him to kill the wounded MODOC, whose mental attacks are powerless against a mind under the Controller's power. Hulk liberates Iron Man by destroying the controller disc. MODOC escapes, the Controller passes out, and Rick and the Hulk move on.
24	"Best Served Cold"	Alexx Van Dyne	Julien Magnat	November 20, 2009	January 9, 2010	March 21, 2010	124
Poisoned by the experimental technology in the mask she uses as Madame Masque, a delirious Whitney tries to kill her father. Stane asks Tony to cure her, but the raw form of the ore he needs to do so can only be found in an abandoned arctic facility. Stane thaws out Blizzard and attempts to force him to retrieve the ore. Blizzard pretends to cooperate, but ultimately destroys the ore for revenge. In the Arctic Armor, Tony saves Stane from Blizzard and Madame Masque. Using ore from his cardiac implant, Tony cures Whitney, who wakes with no memory of the previous months.
25	"Tales of Suspense: Part 1"	Christopher Yost, Craig Kyle, Mike Ryan	Julien Magnat	November 28, 2009	January 16, 2010	March 28, 2010	125
Freed by the Tong, Zhang recovers the rings from Gene, then kidnaps Tony and Pepper, taking the fourth ring and destroying the factory above the Armory. Following Rhodey's information, Zhang proceeds to Machu Picchu where he forces Gene and Tony to activate the test for the fifth ring, "Sacrifice". When a dragon statue called Fin Fang Foom comes to life, the Tong flee, and Pepper manages to take the Mandarin's gauntlet and rings. Meanwhile, Rhodey, having stumbled across the War Machine suit, heads for Peru with the Mark I armor in tow, but a systems failure strands him in space.
26	"Tales of Suspense: Part 2"	Christopher Yost, Craig Kyle, Mike Ryan	Thomas Barichella	January 18, 2010	January 16, 2010	March 28, 2010	126
Using remote control, Rhodey uses the Mark I armor to push himself back into Earth's atmosphere. Arriving at Machu Picchu, he attacks Zhang and the Tong helicopters, and then bursts into the temple. Tony suits up, revealing his identity as Iron Man to Gene. In an abortive attempt to pacify Fin Fang Foom, Pepper had thrown the rings into the dragon's mouth. Eventually, Gene allows the dragon to eat him, saving Pepper and passing the test; reemerging with the gauntlet and all five rings, he reveals himself to be the Mandarin. Furthermore, Gene admits responsibility for the attack on Stark's plane, and claims that Howard is alive and in his custody. After fleeing, confused and frustrated, Gene throws the rings, revealing a map to the locations of five additional rings.

=== Season 2 (2011–12) ===
No. overall	No. in season	Title	Story by	Written by	American air date	Australian air date	UK air date	Prod. code
27	1	"The Invincible Iron Man, Part 1: Disassembled"	Brandon Auman	Romain Van Liemt	July 13, 2011	June 12, 2012	August 17, 2012	201
In the Season 2 opener, Mr. Fix's mysterious new boss orders the abduction of 21-year-old multibillionaire Justin Hammer. But when Iron Man fights the new and improved Whiplash to prevent this, Tony's heart ends up critically damaged in the process.
28	2	"The Invincible Iron Man, Part 2: Reborn!"	Brandon Auman	Romain Van Liemt	July 20, 2011	June 12, 2012	August 18, 2012	202
With Stark International on the line, Tony (who is severely ill and injured) suits up in the all-new Mark 2 Iron Man armor to defeat Whiplash 3.0, Blizzard and Mr. Fix.
29	3	"Look Into the Light"	Eugene Son	Romain Van Liemt	July 27, 2011	June 13, 2012	August 19, 2012	203
When Mr. Fix rematerializes the Living Laser on Justin Hammer's orders, unexpected complications split him into two separate halves. The evil and dark Half seeks out to destroy Iron Man and conquer the world while the good and light half tries to warn Tony and help him.
30	4	"Ghost in the Machine"	Andrew Robinson	Thomas Barichella	August 3, 2011	June 13, 2012	TBA	204
Obadiah Stane hires Ghost to steal the Iron Man armor, and Tony's identity is revealed to Ghost.
31	5	"Armor Wars"	Kevin Burke, Chris "Doc" Wyatt	Kevin Burke, Chris "Doc" Wyatt	August 10, 2011	June 14, 2012	TBA	205
When Stane builds duplicates of the Iron Man armors called the Guardsmen (consisting of Force, Shockwave and Firepower), Tony must reveal they are frauds. But this causes the civilians to start hating Iron Man, as they believe that he is simply jealous of the town's new heroes.
32	6	"Line of Fire"	Clelia Constantine	Mark Henry	August 17, 2011	June 14, 2012	TBA	206
Several attacks on Hammer Multinational lead Tony to discover that Stark International is involved in a civil war. Iron Man discovers that Black Panther is back and is targeting Justin Hammer.
33	7	"Titanium vs. Iron"	Brandon Auman	Thomas Krajewski	August 25, 2011	June 18, 2012	TBA	207
With Justin Hammer finally acquiring specs from the Iron Man armor, he presents potential weapons buyers including Nick Fury with his new creation: Titanium Man.
34	8	"The Might of Doom"	Brandon Auman	Brandon Auman	October 17, 2011	June 18, 2012	TBA	208
Obadiah Stane forms an unlikely partnership with Doctor Doom in a plot to claim the Iron Man armor. Unfortunately, Doctor Doom has plans of his own for Iron Man, and his seemingly magical powers seem too much for Iron Man to handle.
35	9	"The Hawk and the Spider"	Thomas Barichella	Gavin Highnight	October 24, 2011	June 19, 2012	TBA	209
Iron Man attempts to stop Hawkeye and Black Widow from stealing Stark Internationals' UI Chip. As a result, Justin Hammer uses the rebuilt Titanium Man armor to steal the UI Chip and the three must reluctantly team up to get it back.
36	10	"Enter: Iron Monger"	Thomas Barichella, Romain Van Liemt	Eugene Son	October 31, 2011	June 19, 2012	TBA	210
When Obadiah Stane completes the Iron Monger armor, Iron Man and War Machine must fight to the finish with all they have.
37	11	"Fugitive of S.H.I.E.L.D."	David Michelinie, Bob Layton	David Michelinie, Bob Layton	November 7, 2011	June 20, 2012	TBA	211
Black Widow returns stealing from Nick Fury and the S.H.I.E.L.D. helicarrier, and by circumstance and some cold calculation Iron Man ends up being hunted by S.H.I.E.L.D. for that deed.
38	12	"All the Best People Are Mad"	Romain Van Liemt, Clelia Constantine	Mark Henry	November 26, 2011	June 20, 2012	TBA	212
Schoolmate Rhona Irwin turns Tomorrow Academy into a lethal maze of traps for Tony and his schoolmates while her twin brother Andy turns out to be lethal as well. Now Tony must survive Rhona's D.A.T.s (short for Deadly Aptitude Test), free Pepper, Rhodey, Happy, and Whitney, and get to his Iron Man armor to defeat Rhona and Andy.
39	13	"Heavy Mettle"	Thomas Barichella, Mathias Fourrier	Brandon Auman	November 26, 2011	June 21, 2012	TBA	213
After the events involving the Iron Monger armor, Obadiah Stane begins to have it mass-produced. With footage discovered by Tony Stark and Roberta Rhodes which involved his deal with Ghost, Obadiah Stane is fired by the Chairman of the Board. Unfortunately, a comment from Tony accidentally reveals Iron Man's real identity to Obadiah.
40	14	"Mandarin's Quest"	Henry Gilroy	Henry Gilroy	February 29, 2012	June 21, 2012	TBA	214
Mandarin is back and desperately needs Tony's help to claim the eighth Makluan ring. Tony refuses his offer until Mandarin uses one of Makluan Rings to make Tony a slave for him. Now Tony has no choice but to join forces with Mandarin and get the eighth Makluan ring, which is guarded by the Grim Reaper.
41	15	"Hostile Takeover"	Thomas Barichella	Thomas Krajewski	March 7, 2012	June 25, 2012	TBA	215
Justin Hammer manages to buy Stark International, much to the disappointment of Tony Stark. As Iron Man, Tony plans to expose Justin Hammer's true nature. This won't be easy since he'll have to go through Killer Shrike, Unicorn, Whiplash, and even Titanium Man to do so. In the end, even though Hammer owns Stark International, Tony Stark decides to create his own company called Stark Solutions.
42	16	"Extremis"	Thomas Barichella	Rob Benaviddes Jr.	March 14, 2012	June 25, 2012	TBA	216
When S.H.I.E.L.D. agent Mallen is fired by General Nick Fury, Mallen takes the super-serum "Extremis" and mutates into a powerful maniac bent on revenge. When Iron Man tries to fight Mallen, he ends up defeated and in critical health. He is given Extremis to save his life, giving him the ability to manipulate technology.
43	17	"The X-Factor"	Julien Magnat	Brandon Auman	March 21, 2012	June 26, 2012	TBA	217
Tony's new friend Annie Claremont turns out to be a mutant on the run from Magneto, who wants to use her to assassinate anti-mutant politician Robert Kelly. Iron Man tries to protect her, but struggles to battle Magneto, who can manipulate metal.
44	18	"Iron Man 2099"	Julien Magnat	Kevin Burke, Chris "Doc" Wyatt	March 28, 2012	June 26, 2012	TBA	218
Tony gets an unexpected visitation from his future grandson Andros, who has come to eliminate Tony Stark, since he believes that by designing a super-virus named 'Vortex', Tony will be responsible for a catastrophe in the year 2099. Now Tony must take down his own futuristic grandson with the help of Hawkeye, Black Widow, and S.H.I.E.L.D. while avoiding the future disaster at the same time!
45	19	"Control-Alt-Delete"	John Shirley	John Shirley	April 4, 2012	June 27, 2012	TBA	219
Tony wakes up in the Mainframe, a virtual world created by the Controller in a plan to enslave the city – but to reach his goal, he needs Tony's Extremis powers.
46	20	"Doomsday"	TBA	Brandon Auman	June 13, 2012	June 27, 2012	TBA	220
To keep reality itself from being torn apart, Iron Man must team up with The Mandarin to stop Doctor Doom after he captures the Ninth Makluan Ring and his father Howard Stark.
47	21	"The Hammer Falls"	TBA	Bob Layton, David Michelinie	June 20, 2012	June 28, 2012	TBA	221
To keep Stark International from being re-purchased by the Starks, an increasingly insane Justin Hammer unleashes Titanium Man on his former henchmen (whom he suspects to be blackmailing him to give up Hammer Multinational) and develops a sinister zombie gas as his latest weapons project!
48	22	"Rage of the Hulk"	TBA	Gavin Hignight	June 27, 2012	June 28, 2012	TBA	222
Bruce Banner seeks out the Starks for help to rid himself of the Hulk. But when army soldiers led by General Thunderbolt Ross co-opts S.H.I.E.L.D. to make an attack, Iron Man must fight and subdue the Hulk to save him. Ross modifies the gamma siphoner that Banner intended to use to cure himself in an attempt to destroy him, but it instead transforms him into the more intelligent Gray Hulk.
49	23	"Iron Monger Lives"	Thomas Barichella	Eugene Son	July 4, 2012	July 2, 2012	TBA	223
Obadiah Stane and Iron Monger apparently return to wreak revenge on Tony Stark by poisoning Howard, but it is actually a mentally unstable Madame Masque, who is seeking revenge for Tony rendering Obadiah comatose.
50	24	"The Dragonseed"	Julien Magnat	Sean McKeever	July 11, 2012	July 2, 2012	TBA	224
Just a few days before his eighteenth birthday, Tony, Rhodey, and Pepper in her brand new battlesuit travel to China to search for the Mandarin. Gene finds the tenth ring and defeats the last guardian, but the rings - and Gene - harbor a deadly secret.
51	25	"The Makluan Invasion Part 1: Annihilate!"	Thomas Barichella	Mark Henry	July 18, 2012	July 3, 2012	TBA	225
Just on Tony's birthday, the Mandarin makes his move and demands domination over the world. But things take a surprising turn for the worse when the Makluan Overlord arrives on Earth in their spaceship to reclaim the Makluan rings and start a full-scale invasion. Now Tony, Rhodey and Pepper have to save the world and battle the Makluan aliens.
52	26	"The Makluan Invasion Part 2: Unite!"	TBA	Brandon Auman	July 25, 2012	July 3, 2012	TBA	226
Iron Man's friends and allies unite against ultimate odds to stop the Makluan Overlord from destroying Earth.
