= Breakout (The Avengers: Earth's Mightiest Heroes) =

- The Avengers: Earth's Mightiest Heroes episodes
- Giant-Man, Iron Man, Hulk, Wasp and Thor unite to form The Avengers.
- Episode nos.: Season 1 Episodes 6 & 7
- Directed by: Sebastian Montes (Part 1); Vinton Heuck (Part 2)
- Written by: Christopher Yost
- Production codes: 006 & 007
- Original air date: October 20, 2010

Episode chronology
← Previous "The Man in the Ant Hill"	Next → "Some Assembly Required"

"Breakout" is the name of the sixth and seventh episodes of the animated television series The Avengers: Earth's Mightiest Heroes. It was originally broadcast on Disney XD in the United States on October 20, 2010. The episode's broadcast was preceded by the release of an online "micro-series" which introduced the individual heroes and set up the plot.

== Plot ==
=== Part 1 ===
After Iron Man stops an arms trade between A.I.M. and Lucia von Bardas, he transports them to the Vault and returns to New York. In the Cube, Leonard Samson visits the cell of Bruce Banner, who warns him that S.H.I.E.L.D. will use the villains as weapons. Thor watches over a city when he is approached by Balder the Brave from Asgard. Balder tells Thor that his father Odin asked him to come back and protect Asgard before entering Odinsleep. Thor rejects the offer, Balder does not understand and asks why he is so occupied to the city. Thor tells him that he is needed here so that he can make a difference unlike in Asgard who only solely relies on fighting. Below them, Jane Foster is taking care of people who were involved in a traffic accident. Foster is nearly hit by a speeding car, but is saved by Thor. Thor tells that he is intrigued by her since she does not seem to be scared of danger despite being a mortal. Meanwhile, Hank Pym talks with Mad Thinker to see what he meant when he referred to the villains in the super prisons as "soon being free". Also on board, Wasp declines Maria Hill's invitation to join S.H.I.E.L.D.

Banner warns Samson about S.H.I.E.L.D.'s ulterior motives for keeping him imprisoned. Meanwhile, Hawkeye sits silently in his cell at the Vault after being framed by Black Widow. All four prisons' security systems shut down simultaneously, allowing the inmates to escape. The tech-based foes in the Vault raid the armory in an attempt to retrieve their weapons until they are stopped by Hawkeye. Iron Man is alerted and immediately returns to the Vault, which he destroys to keep the villains from escaping. The radiation-based villains of the Cube break loose, during which Samson is exposed to gamma radiation and injured by Zzzax. Banner transforms into the Hulk and escapes with Samson, heading for the nearest civilized area. The villains try to follow him, but the Leader orders them to remain. The prisoners of the shrunken Big House are freed and the prison returns to its normal size, causing the Helicarrier it was kept in to crash into the Hudson River. Nick Fury learns of the other prisons' situations and realizes the same must be happening at the Raft. It is at this moment, Graviton awakens. He lifts the prison into the sky and confronts Fury.

=== Part 2 ===
In a flashback to ten years prior, it is revealed that Graviton was once Franklin Hall, a scientist working for S.H.I.E.L.D. who was tasked by Nick Fury to recreate the serum that empowered Captain America. While working, Hall pushed an experimental reactor to its limits against Fury's orders and was nearly killed when the reactor exploded. While recovering, Hall learned that he had gained the ability to manipulate gravity. Blaming Fury for the accident, Hall intended to attack him, but was subdued and imprisoned in the Raft.

In the present, upon the deactivation of all the super-prisons, Hall awakens unaware of his surroundings, with Baron Zemo informing him that he has been in the Raft for six years. Enraged, Hall seeks vengeance upon Fury for the years taken away from him. Graviton apparently destroys Fury, who is revealed to be a Life Model Decoy. Thor, Hank Pym, and Wasp fight Graviton. Graviton hurls Iron Man into space and lifts Long Island into the air, but Thor slows its fall. Later, they are joined by Hulk and Iron Man. With their combined power they attacked Graviton but he uses his power to hold everybody on the ground. The Hulk fights against this and Ant-Man has an ant bite Graviton's neck, distracting him and freeing the heroes. The heroes unleash their most powerful attacks on Graviton and Wasp finishes him with a sting. They form the Avengers to catch the remaining 74 supervillains that escaped from the prisons.

== Broadcast ==
"Breakout" was originally broadcast on Disney XD in the United States on October 20, 2010. Part 1 originally aired on October 22, 2010 and Part 2 originally aired on October 29, 2010 on Teletoon in Canada.

== Critical reaction ==
"Breakout" was well received by fans and critics. Brian Lowry of Variety called The Avengers: Earth's Mightiest Heroes!, "a slick but dizzyingly busy Disney XD animated program. If not the creative equal of Cartoon Network's superhero team-up Justice League from rival DC Comics, the show unleashes enough action to be plenty mighty with boys and girls, as well as middle-aged adults with comics in Kevlar bags". Kofi Outlaw of Screen Rant called it "a fairly entertaining experience that should appeal to Marvel fans and cartoon fans alike, be they young or old. For all the positive things about it, however, Earth's Mightiest Heroes still doesn’t quite reach the acclaimed status of DC Universe and their animated projects". Stephen Lackey of Mania.com stated, "Avengers: Earth’s Mightiest Heroes doesn’t compare to something like Justice League in animation or in story, but it is a step in the right direction for a Marvel animated product and it did end up being really entertaining". IGN called it "a really fun, action-packed show that should satisfy both new fans and Marvel geeks alike."
