= Para-Man =

Para-Man (Ree Zee) is a fictional character appearing in American comic books published by Marvel Comics. The character first appeared in Marvel Feature #7 (January 1973).

== Fictional character biography ==
Ree Zee was a robot that gained sentience and as the Para-Man believed itself superior to humans, and was defeated by Ant-Man and the Wasp.
