= Iron Man: Rise of Technovore =

2013 superhero anime film by Hiroshi Hamasaki

- DVD cover

Japanese name
- Kanji: アイアンマン：ライズ・オブ・テクノヴォア
Transcriptions
- Revised Hepburn: Aian Man: Raizu Obu Tekunovoa
- Directed by: Hiroshi Hamasaki
- Screenplay by: Kengo Kaji
- Story by: Brandon Auman
- Based on: Iron Man by: Stan Lee; Larry Lieber; Don Heck; Jack Kirby
- Starring: Keiji Fujiwara; Tesshô Genda; Miyu Irino
- Music by: Tetsuya Takahashi
- Production companies: Madhouse; Marvel Entertainment
- Distributed by: Sony Pictures Home Entertainment; Sony Pictures Entertainment Japan
- Release date: April 24, 2013 (Japan)
- Running time: 88 minutes
- Country: Japan
- Languages: Japanese; English

Iron Man: Rise of Technovore (Japanese: アイアンマン：ライズ・オブ・テクノヴォア, Hepburn: Aian Man: Raizu Obu Tekunovoa) is a 2013 Japanese superhero anime film by Madhouse that follows up on the Marvel Anime series. It is directed by Hiroshi Hamasaki, an anime director who is known for his works including Shigurui: Death Frenzy and Texhnolyze, and based on a story written by Brandon Auman. Matthew Mercer and Norman Reedus voiced Tony Stark and Punisher respectively.

== Plot ==
While racing in a Utah desert with War Machine (James "Rhodey" Rhodes), Iron Man is ambushed by a mysterious new enemy who tries to destroy Tony Stark's new security satellite, "The Howard". War Machine is seemingly killed in the struggle and Iron Man sets out for revenge. He is intercepted by S.H.I.E.L.D. and Nick Fury who needs to talk to him. He escapes and makes it over to Pepper Potts who is on vacation.

They discover that A.I.M. (Advanced Idea Mechanics) has been conducting research into techno organic weaponry for some time and pinpoint one of their warehouses in Karachi. S.H.I.E.L.D. locates them and Tony comes out the front to be surrounded by Mandroids. He activates his suitcase armor, destroys all the Mandroids, and heads to Karachi. The scene then cuts to a member of A.I.M. trying to sell weapons to a buyer. Punisher comes in and breaks it up. Just as Punisher is about to kill the A.I.M. member, Iron Man saves him in order to get some answers. Iron Man and Punisher then work together and discover the identity of the new enemy being Ezekiel Stane, the son of Obadiah Stane. Hawkeye and Black Widow are given orders to retrieve Iron Man. Iron Man escapes with the help of the Punisher and continues on to Shanghai where he meets Ezekiel.

Ezekiel paralyzes Iron Man with the Technovore and details his plan to replace humanity with his new technology utilizing the technology on the "Howard" satellite to hack into all computers and satellites. Hawkeye and Black Widow show up and arrest both. Later on the Helicarrier, Iron Man discovers War Machine is barely alive. Then the Technovore hacks the craft leaving Iron Man to use his arc reactor to stabilize the Helicarrier and drive the Technovore out of the systems. Ezekiel is now betrayed by the Technovore and taken over by it causing a big fight with Iron Man resulting in the Helicarrier crashing into Shanghai. When all hope seems lost, War Machine miraculously wakes up and helps Iron Man fight the Technovore.

In a last ditch effort, Iron Man is able to use a backdoor he built into the Howard's system to hack back into it temporarily. He is purposely captured by the Technovore and orders War Machine to fire the satellite's defense laser at Tony's arc reactor before the Technovore is able to use the other satellites to destroy the world. War Machine fires, and the Technovore is defeated with Iron Man seemingly sacrificing himself. Miraculously, Iron Man is saved by War Machine and lives. Ezekiel Stane is seen in the custody of S.H.I.E.L.D.

== Cast ==
Role	Japanese Voice Actor	English Voice Actor	Turkish Voice Actor
Iron Man / Tony Stark	Keiji Fujiwara	Matthew Mercer	Rıza Karaağaçlı
War Machine / James "Rhodey" Rhodes	Hiroki Yasumoto	James C. Mathis III	Oğuz Toydemir
Punisher / Frank Castle	Tesshô Genda	Norman Reedus	Talat Bulut
Ezekiel Stane	Miyu Irino	Eric Bauza	Ali Hekimoğlu
Black Widow / Natasha Romanova	Miyuki Sawashiro	Clare Grant	Mehpare Özlük Divrik
Nick Fury	Hideaki Tezuka	John Eric Bentley	Erhan Türkmen
Pepper Potts	Hiroe Oka	Kate Higgins	Banu Altay
Hawkeye / Clint Barton	Shuuhei Sakaguchi	Troy Baker	Ahmet Taşar
Obadiah Stane	Takaya Hashi	JB Blanc	JB Blanc
J.A.R.V.I.S.	Yasuyuki Kase	Troy Baker	Ali Çorapçı
Sasha Hammer	Houko Kuwashima	Tara Platt	Berna Terzierol
Maria Hill	Junko Minagawa	Kari Wahlgren	Serpil Saraç

Additional English dub voices by Liam O'Brien, Travis Willingham, and Dave Wittenberg.

== Crew ==
- Steve Kramer – Script Adaptation
- Mary Elizabeth McGlynn – Voice Director
- Jamie Simone – Casting Director

== Production ==
The film is produced by SH DTV Partners, a partnership between Marvel Entertainment, Sony Pictures Entertainment Japan and Madhouse.

Screenwriter Brandon Auman stated in an interview with MTV Geek that he was in Japan when he got the call from Marvel to participate in the project, and that he was pleased to work with Madhouse. He said that the reason for choosing Ezekiel Stane as the main villain of the film was because he is the "new Tony Stark".

== Release ==
The film was released in North America on Blu-ray and DVD on April 16, 2013, and on April 24, 2013, in Japan receiving the release of Marvel Studios' Iron Man 3 which was released on May 3, 2013.

== Reception ==
The film has received mixed reviews. John Gholson of Movies.com criticized the dialogue in the film, stating it "is either nebulous to a fault" or "awkwardly on the nose". He also criticized the animation of the film, describing it as stale or lacking thrill during action scenes. Tony Guerrero of Comic Vine gave a 3 of 5 rating, praising the animation and colors of the film. He noted that having different characters involved in the story [compared to the anime television series] gives the world a bigger feel, and this is what a fan would want and expect in a Marvel animated movie. Gary Collinson of Flickering Myth awarded it a score of one out of five, saying "If this is going to be the standard of Marvel's animated movies going forward, then perhaps its time to hand animated duties over to Disney and stick to the Cinematic Universe." Julian White of Starburst magazine awarded it a score of 6 out of 10, saying, "It has its moments – probably enough to keep Marvel fans happy. Anime aficionados, on the other hand, might not be quite so galvanized."
