= Technovore =

Marvel Comics supervillain

- Technovore's debut appearance in Iron Man #294. Art by Kev Hopgood (penciller), Steve Mitchell (inker), Ariane Lenshoek (colorist), and Phil Felix (letterer).

Publication information
- Publisher: Marvel Comics
- First appearance: Iron Man #294 (July 1993)
- Created by: Len Kaminski; Kev Hopgood

In-story information
- Species: Nanobot
- Abilities: Assimilation; Adaption; Shapeshifting

Technovore is a supervillain appearing in American comic books published by Marvel Comics, typically as an enemy of the superhero Iron Man.

Technovore appears in the TV series Iron Man: Armored Adventures, and is one of the two titular main antagonists for the anime film Iron Man: Rise of Technovore.

== Publication history ==
Technovore first appears in Iron Man #294 (July 1993) and was created by Len Kaminski and Kevin Hopgood.

== Fictional character biography ==
Technovore is a technological parasite created by a scientist onboard an orbital space station owned by Stark Industries. Iron Man investigates and finds that the space station's crew have been transformed into techno-organic creatures. After Iron Man destroys the creatures, they reform into a single being called Technovore.

Iron Man battles the Technovore, but struggles due to its ability to reform itself if injured. After Technovore destroys the space station, Iron Man battles the creature in space and destroys it with his auto-destruct sequence. Just before his suit explodes, the Goddess saves Iron Man from being killed.

Unbeknownst to Iron Man, a portion of Technovore survives and is recovered by the black market network Source Control.

== Powers and abilities ==
Technovore's body is made entirely of nanobots. It can disassemble itself into a stream of nanites, enabling it to fit into and travel through small spaces. Each nanite carries a copy of Technovore's personality, and it is implied to be able to reconstruct itself from a single unit.

Technovore can absorb technology into itself, adding the abilities of consumed technology into its physical being. In addition, Technovore's inherent resilience is augmented by an ability to adapt to weapons; over time, it will become immune to a given weapon if struck enough times.

== In other media ==
=== Television ===
- Technovore appears in Iron Man: Armored Adventures, voiced by Tabitha St. Germain. This version is a virus created by Tony Stark to consume Project Pegasus' data on the Iron Man and Crimson Dynamo armors to stop Obadiah Stane from getting them. Technovore obtains sentience after uploading into Project Pegasus's nanobot project and uses it to create a body.
- Technovore appears in The Avengers: Earth's Mightiest Heroes, voiced by Dwight Schultz. This version was originally an inmate of the Vault before escaping off-screen in the series' pilot episode "Breakout". In "Alone Against A.I.M.", Technovore is captured and reprogrammed by A.I.M. agents to attack Iron Man before being killed after consuming the energy of his arc reactor.
- Technovore appears in the Spider-Man episode "Web of Venom". This version is a technological parasite developed and abandoned by Horizon High. Curt Connors releases Technovore and frames Grady Scraps for doing so until Spider-Man destroys it.

=== Film ===
Technovore appears in Iron Man: Rise of Technovore, voiced by Miyu Irino in the Japanese version and Eric Bauza in the English dub. This version is a biotechnological nanite virus created by Zeke Stane and initially linked to his nervous system before becoming independent.
