= Iron Man: Armored Adventures =

Superhero animated series

- Genre: Superhero
- Based on: Iron Man by: Stan Lee; Larry Lieber; Don Heck; Jack Kirby
- Developed by: Alexandre de La Patellière; Craig Kyle; Romain van Liemt; Christopher Yost
- Directed by: Stéphane Juffé (season 1); Philippe Guyenne
- Creative directors: Stéphane Juffé; Philippe Guyenne
- Voices of: Adrian Petriw; Daniel Bacon; Anna Cummer; Vincent Tong; Mackenzie Gray
- Theme music composer: Robert Schwartzman
- Opening theme: "Iron Man: Armored Adventures Theme" by Rooney
- Ending theme: "Iron Man: Armored Adventures Theme" by Rooney
- Composer: Guy Michelmore
- Countries of origin: France; United States; Luxembourg; United Kingdom (season 1)
- Original languages: English; French; Luxembourgish
- No. of seasons: 2
- No. of episodes: 52 (list of episodes)

Production
- Executive producers: Aton Soumache; Alexis Vonarb; Dimitri Rassam; Kevin Feige; Stan Lee; Avi Arad; Eric S. Rollman; Tapaas Chakravarti; Lilian Eche (season 1); Steve Christian (season 1); Trevor Drinkwater (season 1); Stephen K. Bannon (season 1); Jeph Loeb (season 2); Jean-Marie Musique (season 2)
- Producers: Cédric Pilot (season 1); Romain van Liemt (season 1); Joshua Fine (season 1); Cort Lane (season 1); Megan Thomas Bradner (season 2)
- Running time: 22 minutes
- Production companies: Method Animation; Marvel Animation; DQ Entertainment; LuxAnimation (season 1); Isle of Man Film (season 1); Genius (season 1); Fabrique D'Images (season 2); Onyx Lux (season 2); France Télévisions (season 2)

Original release
- Network: France 2 (France, season 1); France 4 (France, season 2); Nicktoons (United States)
- Release: April 24, 2009 – July 25, 2012

Iron Man: Armored Adventures (also known in early promotional materials as Iron Man: The Animated Series) is a French-Luxembourgish-British-American 3D CGI-animated series based on the Marvel Comics superhero Iron Man. It debuted in the United States on Nicktoons on April 24, 2009, and it aired on Teletoon in Canada. The series is story edited by showrunner Christopher Yost, who also worked on Wolverine and the X-Men, and numerous other Marvel Animation projects. The television show is not related to the 2007 animated film The Invincible Iron Man; it has a different voice cast, but some story elements are similar and the show uses the same musical score as the film in some instances. It is the first Iron Man television series since Iron Man from 1994 to 1996 (and the last until Iron Man and His Awesome Friends in 2025), and started airing after the success of the live action Iron Man film, which had been distributed by Nicktoons' sibling Paramount Pictures.

The series follows the adventures of a younger version of Tony Stark and his alter ego of Iron Man. As Iron Man, he uses his technological inventions to fight other similarly technologically advanced threats. His friends James "Rhodey" Rhodes and Pepper Potts help him on his courageous and dangerous adventures.

The second season of this series premiered on July 13, 2011, running concurrently with the English dub of the completely separate Marvel Anime: Iron Man anime series, which had already finished airing on Japan's Animax in 2010.

On August 25, 2012, it was revealed that Iron Man: Armored Adventures would air as part of The CW's new Saturday morning children's block Vortexx. After November 24, 2012, Vortexx ceased airing the show and replaced it with Transformers: Prime on December 8, 2012.

As of May 2025, both seasons of the show are available on Disney+ (as of January 2021) and Amazon Prime Canada via Crave.

== Synopsis ==
After a plane crash in which his industrialist father Howard Stark disappears after refusing to weaponize the Earth Mover at Obadiah Stane's behest, Tony Stark uses a high-tech suit of armor he has constructed and investigates a charge that Stane may have been involved in his father's death. As Iron Man, Tony spends his time stopping Stane's plans and saving the world from other villains, such as Mandarin, Mr. Fix, Whiplash, A.I.M., Living Laser, the Maggia, Controller, Crimson Dynamo, Blizzard, Killer Shrike, Unicorn, MODOK, Ghost, Black Knight, and Technovore. He is assisted in his crime fighting efforts by James Rhodes and Pepper Potts. Tony's activities as Iron Man usually result in his needing to make up excuses as to why he is constantly late or missing from school and other activities. Dependent on his technology for survival, Tony must balance the pressures of teenage life with the duties of being a superhero.

=== First season ===
The first season of Iron Man: Armored Adventures has a total of 26 episodes. It focuses on Tony, Pepper, Rhodey, and Gene Khan working together to find the five Makluan rings. After overthrowing his stepfather Xin Zhang, Gene secretly works undercover to steal the rings from his friends, and ends up betraying them. At the end of the season, Gene discovers that there are five additional rings, while Tony learns that Howard survived, but was captured.

=== Second season ===
The second season of Iron Man: Armored Adventures has a total of 26 episodes, just like the first season. Black Widow, Hawkeye, Doctor Doom, Magneto, and Justin Hammer appear in this season.

The second season covers the Armor Wars saga and Stane International storylines, with Rhodey becoming War Machine during the first half of the season. Meanwhile, Gene forces Howard to help him find the remaining rings. In the second half of the season, Justin Hammer buys Stark International and Iron Man must stop him from weaponizing its projects.

In the series finale, Iron Man and various other heroes work to stop the Makluan aliens from destroying Earth.

== Episodes ==
Season	Episodes	Originally released	
Season	Episodes	First released	Last released
1	26	April 24, 2009	January 18, 2010
2	26	July 13, 2011	July 25, 2012

== Cast ==
=== Main cast ===
- Adrian Petriw – Tony Stark / Iron Man
- Daniel Bacon – Rhodey Rhodes / War Machine
- Vincent Tong – Gene Khan, Xin Zhang / Mandarin
- Anna Cummer – Pepper Potts / Rescue
- Mackenzie Gray – Obadiah Stane / Iron Monger

=== Supporting cast ===
- Alistair Abell – Happy Hogan, Black Knight
- Michael Adamthwaite – Justin Hammer / Titanium Man, J.A.R.V.I.S.
- Ashleigh Ball – Natasha Romanoff / Black Widow
- Eric Bauza – Thunderbolt Ross
- Lisa Ann Beley – Iron Man Computer, Abigail Brand
- Jeffrey Bowyer-Chapman – Black Panther
- Christopher Britton – Doctor Doom
- Louis Chirillo – Arthur Parks / Living Laser
- Michael Daingerfield – Unicorn
- Michael Dobson – Ghost, Makluan Warrior
- Brian Drummond – O'Brian, Makluan Warrior
- Mark Gibbon – Hulk
- Andrew Francis – Rick Jones, Hawkeye
- Catherine Haggquist – Roberta Rhodes
- Ron Halder – Abraham Klein, Magneto, Professor X
- Fred Henderson – Howard Stark
- Peter Kelamis – Whiplash
- Michael Kopsa – Controller
- Paula Lindberg – Sasha
- Donny Lucas – Mr. Fix
- Kristie Marsden – Whitney Stane / Madame Masque
- Richard Newman – Anton Harkov
- Brenna O'Brien – Rhona Burchill / Mad Thinker
- Mark Oliver – Ivan Vanko / Crimson Dynamo
- David Orth – Donnie Gill / Blizzard
- Ty Olsson – Killer Shrike
- Dean Redman – Nick Fury
- Russell Roberts – Count Nefaria
- Tabitha St. Germain – Maria Hill, Technovore
- Venus Terzo – Jean Grey
- French Tickner - Professor Zimmer
- Lee Tockar – MODOK
- Dale Wilson – Robert Kelly
- Alex Zahara – Peter Corbeau

== Production ==
=== Pre-release ===
Talks for a modern Iron Man animated series began in 2003 as a tie in with the proposed Nick Cassavetes directed Iron Man film at New Line Cinema alongside a Fantastic Four animated series that would eventually become Fantastic Four: World's Greatest Heroes. Months before the series' television debut, Marvel had a screening of the first episode at San Diego Comic-Con. Additionally, several promotional videos were released on the Marvel website.

=== Theme song ===
Popular rock band Rooney recorded the theme song to the series. The song originally could be downloaded from Teletoon's website. A provided "secret code", Tony, would be needed to access the theme. This "secret code" was shown onscreen during Canadian broadcasts of the first few episodes of the first season. The music video for the theme song features clips of Rooney singing, along with clips of Iron Man from the show.

=== Animation style ===
The series is made primarily using computer-generated imagery (CGI), in a similar style to Spider-Man: The New Animated Series. The technique is similar to cel-shading animation technique, although the detail and resolution are lower.

== DVD releases ==
=== United States ===
The pilot episode was released as a bonus feature in Wal-Mart's DVD edition of Iron Man (2008).

Distribution rights to the series in North America was held by Vivendi Entertainment. Volume One was released on DVD in the United States on October 20, 2009. The Blu-ray edition was released exclusively through Best Buy Volume Two was released in the United States on January 5, 2010. These two releases were distributed through Genius Entertainment. The Complete Season One was released in the United States on May 4, 2010. The Complete Season One set included an unreleased pair of Volume Three and Four DVDs.

Season Two, Volume One was released on DVD on June 26, 2012, with Volume Two released on September 25, 2012. The Season 2, Volume 3 DVD was released on January 22, 2013. Season 2 Volume 4 and the complete second season set became available April 23, 2013.

=== United Kingdom ===
In the UK, distribution rights to the series were held by ITV Global Entertainment. Volume One contains the first 13 episodes (the one-hour pilot being split into two separate episodes) on two discs.

=== Australia ===
The complete first season was released on Blu-ray in Australia.

== Reception ==
The hour-long premiere of Iron Man: Armored Adventures broke Nicktoons Network's record of highest-rated original series by premiering with over 125,000 viewers.

Reviews of the pilot episode have been mixed. Some praise the series for its detailed and layered writing, strong continuity, and character designs. Entertainment Weekly gave the series debut a B+ grade, saying, "What could've been a clunky retrograde reboot works surprisingly well, thanks to some smart writing and stellar CG butt-kickery."

=== Awards ===
In 2012, Iron Man: Armored Adventures won the Pulcinella Award for Best TV Series for Teens.

In 2013, it was included on TV Guide's list of the 60 greatest cartoons of all time.
