= Maria Hill =

Comic book character

- Maria Hill, from Secret Invasion #5. Art by Leinil Francis Yu.

Publication information
- Publisher: Marvel Comics
- First appearance: New Avengers #4 (March 2005)
- Created by: Brian Michael Bendis (writer); David Finch (artist)

In-story information
- Alter ego: Maria Christina Hill
- Species: Human
- Team affiliations: U.S. military; S.H.I.E.L.D.; Avengers; Secret Avengers; Force Works
- Partnerships: Nick Fury; Iron Man; Captain America
- Notable aliases: Director Hill; Commander Hill; Deputy Commander Hill
- Abilities: Expert marksman and mastery of various other weapons; Trained hand-to-hand combatant; Highly trained in weaponry

Commander Maria Hill is a character appearing in American comic books published by Marvel Comics. Created by Brian Michael Bendis and David Finch, the character first appeared in New Avengers #4 (March 2005). As a former director of S.H.I.E.L.D., she appears in various storylines which often feature the Avengers or members of that group.

Cobie Smulders portrayed Maria Hill in the Marvel Cinematic Universe (MCU), appearing in the films The Avengers (2012), Captain America: The Winter Soldier (2014), Avengers: Age of Ultron (2015), Avengers: Infinity War (2018), and Avengers: Endgame (2019). Additionally, Smulders appeared as the character in the television series Agents of S.H.I.E.L.D. and the miniseries Secret Invasion (2023), voiced alternate timeline versions of the character in the Disney+ animated series What If...? (2021–2024) and Moon Girl and Devil Dinosaur (2023–2025), and portrayed a Skrull impersonator of Hill in the film Spider-Man: Far From Home (2019).

== Publication history ==
Maria Hill first appeared in New Avengers #4 (March 2005), and was created by Brian Michael Bendis and David Finch.

Joe Quesada, who was Marvel's editor-in-chief during her first appearance, describes the character thus: "[Hill] is such a strong personality, she's like a force of nature and quite frankly, while perhaps not immediately loved by all involved, she's certainly as strong and imposing a figure as Nick Fury. Right now I feel that people view her as the outsider but [while] I don't think she's any harsher than Fury has ever been, what's different is that we aren't quite clear about her motives."

She appeared as a supporting character in the 2010–2013 Avengers series, from issue #1 (July 2010) through its final issue, #34 (January 2013), but only appeared sporadically after the first half of its run.

In 2014, she was a regular character in Black Widow and Secret Avengers.

== Fictional character biography ==
=== Introduction ===
Maria Hill was born in Chicago, Illinois. She joins the United States armed forces and later becomes an agent of S.H.I.E.L.D. After Nick Fury's removal as Director of S.H.I.E.L.D. due to the fallout of unauthorized strike on Latveria, Hill is made director of S.H.I.E.L.D.

The Avengers suspect Hill of being complicit in various crimes, but lack evidence to prove it. At the same time, Hill suspects the group's latest incarnation are harboring an illicit agenda in connection with the "House of M" affair. She abducts Spider-Man and the Vision to question the two about the situation. She earns Iron Man's respect when she ignores the President of the United States's orders to nuke an island while the Avengers are on it.

=== "Civil War" ===
In the 2006–2007 storyline "Civil War", Captain America refuses to assist Commander Hill in preparations to arrest any superheroes who refuse to comply with the Superhuman Registration Act due to seeing such activity as politically motivated. Hill argued that the will of the American people must be obeyed, attempting to arrest Captain America who fights out of the Helicarrier and escapes. After the Superhuman Registration Act passes into law, Hill is one of the leading enforcers. She blackmails Wonder Man into actively supporting the S.H.I.E.L.D. crusade to hunt down the superheroes opposed to the Superhuman Registration Act. After foiling an attack on Stark Tower, Hill thinks that she does not want her job as director of S.H.I.E.L.D. and thinks she should not have been offered the position in the first place. At the conclusion, the President appoints Tony Stark as the director of S.H.I.E.L.D., with Hill as acting deputy director.

=== Deputy Director ===
After being made Deputy Director, Hill becomes a core member of the S.H.I.E.L.D. cabinet and assists Stark in dealing with a sudden rise in various terrorist groups who have gained access to hyper-advanced biological weapons. Unlike the rest of the cabinet, Hill remains skeptical of a single conspiracy behind all these attacks. When the Mandarin's neoplastic tumor began infecting the Helicarrier, Hill organizes the evacuation; she wrongly believed the infection is the main objective of the attack. Subsequently, however, Hill becomes much more trusting in Stark's leadership, a trusted agent in her role as Deputy Director and far less bound by conventional process, particularly after a confrontation with Dum Dum Dugan, in which she's forced to confront the fact that she was apparently willing to take actions that would allow innocent people to die while still sticking to "the book" because the alternative was to disobey orders. She eventually risks her career by locking down the United Nations under S.H.I.E.L.D. martial law so Stark can escape a tribunal and track down the Mandarin.

=== 2008–2010 storylines ===
During the 2008 "Secret Invasion" storyline, Hill is left in charge of S.H.I.E.L.D. and confronts a number of Skrulls. They execute her but she is revealed to be a Life Model Decoy. Hill then activates the Helicarrier's self-destruct system, killing all the Skrull infiltrators on board, escaping via jet pack.

During the "Dark Reign" storyline, S.H.I.E.L.D is disbanded by the President, Hill and Stark lose their jobs, and are replaced by Norman Osborn who then reforms the fallen remains into H.A.M.M.E.R. In the Iron Man monthly series, Hill tries to go about having a normal life but Osborn dispatches H.A.M.M.E.R. to arrest her for theft. She joins her former boss as a fugitive after Iron Man stole the Superhuman Registration Database. The night before Stark leaves, the two have a sexual tryst. Hill is sent on a mission by Stark to retrieve a hard drive. Hill finds the Controller holed up in the basement of Futurepharm, hooked into a large machine holding many people in containers. She barely manages to escape him, before downloading the data Tony sent her for. The skirmish with the Controller would leave her in a state of paranoia for a while. She then enlists Black Widow to deliver the data to Captain America, all the while evading H.A.M.M.E.R. agents. However, they are captured when H.A.M.M.E.R. intercepts an e-mail from Stark. They are rescued by Pepper Potts.

During the 2010 "Siege" storyline, Hill comes to the aid of Thor after Osborn launches an attack on Asgard. Hill becomes a supporting cast member in the Iron Man series, protecting her friends from multiple threats. In the 2010 "Heroic Age" storyline, which followed "Siege", Hill is appointed by Captain Steve Rogers to work with a new team of Avengers.

=== 2010s–2020s storylines ===
Following the apparent death of Fury, she was appointed commander, then acting director, and finally director of S.H.I.E.L.D. following Daisy Johnson's actions that involved the Secret Avengers invading A.I.M. Island.

During the "Avengers: Standoff!" storyline, Hill and S.H.I.E.L.D. establish Pleasant Hill, a super villain prison designed to resemble a gated community. Hill and the S.H.I.E.L.D. scientists have used reality-warping technology derived from Kobik, a Cosmic Cube, to make the inmates into harmless civilians. Rogers is brought before Hill, telling her of the knowledge that the Kobik project was not disposed of. When Rogers demands to know where Kobik's fragments are, Hill reveals that Kobik has taken a humanoid form.

== Powers and abilities ==
Maria Hill is a commander, leader, tactician, and military strategist. She is a martial artist and hand-to-hand fighter, as well as being a proficient marksman and armed combatant.

== Reception ==
=== Accolades ===
- In 2015, Entertainment Weekly ranked Maria Hill 37th in their "Let's rank every Avenger ever" list.
- In 2019, Comic Book Resources (CBR) ranked Maria Hill 2nd in their "10 Best S.H.I.E.L.D. Agents Of All Time" list.
- In 2020, Scary Mommy included Maria Hill in their "Looking For A Role Model? These 195+ Marvel Female Characters Are Truly Heroic" list.
- In 2020, CBR ranked Maria Hill 2nd in their "10 Best Directors To Lead S.H.I.E.L.D." list.
- In 2021, CBR ranked Maria Hill 4th in their "10 Best Agents Of S.H.I.E.L.D." list.
- In 2022, The A.V. Club ranked Maria Hill 83rd in their "100 best Marvel characters" list.

== Other versions ==
=== MC2 ===
An alternate universe version of Maria Hill from Earth-982 appears in MC2. This version is a member of the National Security Force.

=== Old Woman Laura ===
An alternate universe version of Maria Hill from Earth-18366 appears in Old Woman Laura. This version is a cyborg and head of the joint Chiefs of Staff under President Kamala Khan before being killed by a Doombot.

=== Ultimate Marvel ===
An alternate universe version of Maria Hill from Earth-1610 appears in the Ultimate Marvel imprint. This version is an ex-S.H.I.E.L.D. agent and a homicide detective currently working for the NYPD.

== In other media ==
=== Television ===
Maria Hill in The Avengers: Earth's Mightiest Heroes

- Maria Hill appears in Iron Man: Armored Adventures, voiced by Tabitha St. Germain.
- Maria Hill appears in The Avengers: Earth's Mightiest Heroes, voiced by Kari Wuhrer. This version initially works under Nick Fury until he disappears, leading to her taking his place as director of S.H.I.E.L.D.
- Maria Hill appears in Marvel Disk Wars: The Avengers, voiced by Akeno Watanabe in Japanese and Kari Wahlgren in English.
- Maria Hill makes non-speaking appearances in Avengers Assemble.
- Maria Hill appears in Moon Girl and Devil Dinosaur, voiced by Cobie Smulders.

=== Film ===
- Maria Hill appears in Iron Man: Rise of Technovore, voiced by Junko Minagawa in the Japanese version and Kari Wahlgren in the English dub.
- Maria Hill appears in Avengers Confidential: Black Widow & Punisher, voiced again by Junko Minagawa in the Japanese version and Kari Wahlgren in the English dub.

=== Marvel Cinematic Universe ===
Cobie Smulders as Maria Hill in The Avengers

Maria Hill appears in media set in the Marvel Cinematic Universe (MCU), portrayed by Cobie Smulders. This version is a close friend of Nick Fury and ally of the Avengers. Throughout her appearances, she initially serves as deputy director of S.H.I.E.L.D. before joining Stark Industries following the organization's dissolution, and falls victim to the Blip before she is killed by Skrull rebel Gravik while helping Fury stop him. Hill first appears in the live-action films The Avengers, Captain America: The Winter Soldier, Avengers: Age of Ultron, Avengers: Infinity War, and Avengers: Endgame. Additionally, Hill appears in the live-action TV series Agents of S.H.I.E.L.D. and the live-action miniseries Secret Invasion, while the Skrull Soren assumes Hill's likeness in the live-action film Spider-Man: Far From Home. Furthermore, Smulders voices alternate timeline variants of Hill in the animated series What If...?.

=== Video games ===
- Maria Hill appears as a non-player character (NPC) in Marvel: Ultimate Alliance 2, voiced by Margaret Easley.
- Maria Hill appears as an NPC in Marvel Avengers Alliance.
- Maria Hill appears in Marvel Avengers: Battle for Earth, voiced by Mary Elizabeth McGlynn.
- Maria Hill appears as an NPC in Marvel Heroes and Disney Infinity 3.0, voiced again by Kari Wuhrer.
- Maria Hill appears as an unlockable playable character in Lego Marvel Super Heroes, voiced by Danielle Nicolet.
- Maria Hill appears as an unlockable playable character in Lego Marvel's Avengers, voiced again by Cobie Smulders.
- Maria Hill appears as an NPC in Marvel: Avengers Alliance Tactics.
- Maria Hill appears as a playable character in Marvel Puzzle Quest.
- Maria Hill appears in Iron Man VR, voiced by Ali Hillis.
- Maria Hill appears in Marvel's Avengers, voiced by Jennifer Hale.
- Maria Hill appears in Marvel Snap.

=== Miscellaneous ===
- Maria Hill appears in the Marvel Rising motion comic, voiced by Vanessa Marshall.
- Maria Hill appears in Marvel Universe Live!.

== See also ==
- List of S.H.I.E.L.D. members
