= Controller (Marvel Comics) =

Fictional character in Marvel Comics

- Art by Sean Chen

Publication information
- Publisher: Marvel Comics
- First appearance: Iron Man #12 (April 1969)
- Created by: Archie Goodwin (writer); George Tuska (artist)

In-story information
- Alter ego: Basil Sandhurst
- Species: Human mutate
- Team affiliations: New Enforcers
- Abilities: Genius-level intellect; Mind control; Powered armor grants: Superhuman strength, stamina, and durability; Flight via boot jets; Psychokinesis via helmet; Use of Slave Discs

Controller (Basil Sandhurst) is a supervillain appearing in American comic books published by Marvel Comics. The character is usually depicted as an enemy of Iron Man.

== Publication history ==
Controller first appeared in Iron Man #12 and was created by Archie Goodwin and George Tuska.

== Fictional character biography ==
Basil Sandhurst was born in Kittery Point, Maine. Sandhurst worked as an electro-mechanical/chemical research scientist. His obsession with control brought his downfall as a scientist when his refusal to obey ethical restraints got him banned from most research facilities. Sandhurst was prone to fits of rage and in an attempt to calm him, his brother Vincent inadvertently triggered a lab explosion, crippling Basil. Vincent, guilt-ridden, outfitted Basil with an automated lab in which Basil bonded a super-strong exoskeleton to his body, powered by the cerebral energies from those around him using his slave discs. As the Controller, he plans to invade and enslave New York City, but Iron Man and S.H.I.E.L.D. agent Jasper Sitwell foil his scheme and leave him comatose. After recovering from his coma, the Controller takes over the Pinewood Sanitarium. He creates an improved set of equipment, but is again defeated by Iron Man.

Months later, the Controller is released from prison by Thanos, who upgrades his technology. Thanos promises the Controller rulership of Earth, and so he begins enslaving dozens of operatives. He invades Avengers Mansion, defeats the Avengers and Captain Mar-Vell, and abducts Lou-Ann Savannah. The Controller's egotistical displays endanger Thanos's security; when the Controller fails to defeat Captain Marvel, Thanos leaves him for dead.

The Controller goes underground for years, upgrading via Stark technology stolen from Justin Hammer, and eventually enslaves a cult. He sets the Blood Brothers against Iron Man and Daredevil. Iron Man defeats him and imprisons him in a vat of experimental plastic, but he escapes. Alongside one of the Blood Brothers, the Controller battles Iron Man, but Iron Man defeats him once more and he is imprisoned in the Vault.

During the "Acts of Vengeance" storyline, the Controller escapes from the Vault and, at the behest of the Red Skull, enslaves Namor and sets him against Captain America. He unsuccessfully attempts to control Loki at the behest of the Red Skull, and unsuccessfully attempts to aid the Red Skull against Magneto. He is ultimately defeated by Captain America.

In the "Secret Invasion" storyline, the Hood hires the Controller as part of his criminal organization to take advantage of the split in the superhero community caused by the Superhuman Registration Act. He appears as part of the Hood's alliance with super-powered heroes; the grouping is intent on defeating the Skrull invasion force of New York City.

Maria Hill finds the Controller holed up in the basement of a Futurepharm facility in Austin, Texas, while on orders from Tony Stark. He has been abducting members of the local populace for months to bolster a new army and attempts to brainwash Hill as well. However, she resists his efforts and frees his drones, sabotaging the entire operation.

The Controller later appears in Boston, assembling major crime families together in an Italian restaurant. When the Avengers invade the restaurant, the Controller uses his discs on the criminals as well as Captain America and the Wasp, but he is defeated by Thor. After the Avengers defeat the first wave of Leviathon monsters, the Controller tries to put a control disc on Thor, but he is stopped by Hercules.

When Tony Stark rebrands his company as Stark Unlimited, Controller infiltrates it while enslaving Bethany Cabe. The Controller tampers with the eScape, a virtual reality program, to enthrall the minds of those who use it. This results in eScape users being armed with real weapons that they unknowingly use to wreak havoc, with the Controller siphoning their energy. By the time Stark learns Controller's location and confronts him, he has already consumed enough energy to grow in size. After returning to the real world, Stark hijacks Baintronics' factory to create the Godbuster armor, which he uses to defeat Controller.

== Powers, abilities, and equipment ==
The Controller uses an armored exoskeleton which is micro-surgically attached to his body and grants him augmented strength, stamina, and durability. By utilizing the microcircuitry in his helmet, he can drain cerebral energy from others to power up his exoskeleton, magnify its strength, and duplicate their abilities. He has limited psychic capabilities, such as the ability to control a person's actions via his slave discs or project bolts of mental force from his helmet. The Controller can telepathically manipulate "weak-willed" subjects even without the discs.

== In other media ==
=== Television ===
- The Controller appears in the Iron Man (1994) episode "The Armor Wars", voiced by Jamie Horton. This version's discs were made using Iron Man's technology.
- The Controller appears in Iron Man: Armored Adventures, voiced by Michael Kopsa. This version is an A.I.M. scientist.

=== Video games ===
- Two Controllers, both named Control, appear in Captain America and the Avengers.
- The Controller appears in the Wii version of Iron Man (2008), voiced by Jim Ward. This version is an agent of A.I.M.
