= Wasp (character) =

Marvel comics superheroine

Janet van Dyne Wasp
- Janet van Dyne as Wasp on the cover of The Avengers #71 (November 2003). Art by J. G. Jones

Publication information
- Publisher: Marvel Comics
- First appearance: Tales to Astonish #44 (June 1963)
- Created by: Stan Lee (writer/plotter); Ernie Hart (writer/scripter); Jack Kirby (artist)

In-story information
- Full name: Janet van Dyne
- Species: Human mutate
- Team affiliations: Avengers; Uncanny Avengers; Agents of Wakanda; Lady Liberators; West Coast Avengers; Mighty Avengers; Defenders
- Partnerships: Hank Pym
- Notable aliases: Wasp; Winsome Wasp; Wondrous Wasp; Giant Woman
- Abilities: Flight via bio-synthetic wings; Bio-electric energy blasts; Telepathic insect control; Size manipulation

The Wasp (Janet van Dyne) is a character appearing in American comic books published by Marvel Comics. Created by Stan Lee, Ernie Hart, and Jack Kirby, the character first appeared in Tales to Astonish #44 (June 1963).

Janet van Dyne is usually depicted as having the ability to shrink to a height of several centimeters, fly by means of insectoid wings, and fire bioelectric energy blasts. She is a founding member of the Avengers and the one who gave them their name as well as a longtime leader of the team. She is also the ex-wife of Hank Pym and the stepmother of Nadia van Dyne. The Wasp has been described as one of Marvel's most notable and powerful female heroes.

Michelle Pfeiffer portrayed Janet van Dyne in the Marvel Cinematic Universe films while Evangeline Lilly portrayed an original MCU version, Hope van Dyne (based on Hope Pym), in the films Ant-Man (2015), Ant-Man and the Wasp (2018), Avengers: Endgame (2019) and Ant-Man and the Wasp: Quantumania (2023).

== Publication history ==
Wasp's first appearance in Tales to Astonish #44 (June 1963). Art by Jack Kirby and Don Heck.

Janet van Dyne debuted in Tales to Astonish #44 (plotted by Stan Lee, scripted by H. E. Huntley, and drawn by Jack Kirby, June 1963) as Hank Pym's partner, becoming the Wasp to avenge the death of her father, scientist Vernon van Dyne. She co-starred in Tales to Astonish from issue #44–69 (1963–65). She was also the star of her own backup feature in issues #51–58 (1964).

She was a founding member of the Avengers, appearing in the first issue and giving the team its name. It is with the Avengers that Janet became most well known. At first she was the weak link of the team, but later on became one of the smartest and craftiest of its members. Though she takes leaves of absence throughout the series, she is one of the longest active members and has acted as leader of the team for longer than anyone besides Captain America.

During her absences from the core Avengers book, Janet appeared in various other publications, including appearing as a supporting character in several issues of a revived Ant-Man series in Marvel Feature issues #6–10 (1972–73). She has also made sporadic guest appearances in various other books, such as Captain America, Iron Man, and Fantastic Four.

Janet became the leader of the Avengers in The Avengers #217 (1982), a position she held until issue #278 (1987), with the exception of a brief period where she handed leadership off to the Vision. She then appeared in issue #32 of West Coast Avengers (May 1988), becoming a full-time member in issue #42.

She made occasional appearances in Avengers (vol. 3), returning as an active member of the team in issue #27 (2000) before resuming leadership duties. She and Captain America became co-leaders of the team starting in issue #38.

After the events of "Avengers Disassembled", Janet appeared in the limited series Beyond! before rejoining the Avengers in The Mighty Avengers #1 (2007). She was presumed dead during the events of Secret Invasion in 2008. The Wasp returned in the Avengers "End Times" storyline that ran from issue #31 (December 2012) to 34 (January 2013). She then appeared as a member of the Avengers Unity Squad in Uncanny Avengers and as an Agent of Wakanda in the Fresh Start title of the Avengers. Janet became the romantic interest for her fellow Avenger Iron Man in 2018, and was a regular character in the Iron Man comic book until 2020.

=== Design ===
In his 1970s run on The Avengers, artist George Pérez revamped the character's costume a number of times, having a significant impact on the character's development:

It became a joke. In the case of the Wasp, I noticed that she has so many costumes that eventually I said "Why not?" I think I was on the book long enough what was once just a little bit of idiosyncrasy about the character became fully part of the character's persona.

== Fictional character biography ==
=== 1960s ===
The "Winsome Wasp" depicted by John Buscema as a 1960s glamour girl

Janet van Dyne was born in Cresskill, New Jersey, the socialite daughter of wealthy scientist Vernon van Dyne. When her father is killed by an alien entity unleashed during one of his experiments, Janet turns to his associate Dr. Hank Pym for aid and convinces him to help her. To avenge her father's death, she undergoes a biochemical procedure that grants her the ability to grow wings upon shrinking under four feet tall and uses a supply of "Pym particles" by which to change her size. Together, she and Ant-Man defeat the alien and avenge her father. Janet decides to remain as Wasp and be Hank's partner as she has fallen in love with him, though Hank initially rejects her feelings due to the similarities between her and his murdered first wife.

During her time as Hank's partner, she took part in numerous conflicts with villains who included the Porcupine, Egghead, and Whirlwind (then known as the Human Top). Though initially without any offensive powers, Janet proves to be resourceful, using her ability to communicate with insects to fight, as well as using a pin to poke people as a weapon. Later, she uses a miniature air gun, the original wasp's sting.

After the initial confrontation with Loki that brought together the founding Avengers, it is Janet and Hank who propose forming a team of superheroes. Janet suggests the name for the team and becomes a founding member. Never lacking confidence or bravery and by nature an outgoing personality, Janet is always in the thick of battles with villains, who include Norse gods and aliens, despite being the most underpowered member of the team. Janet frequently comments on the attractiveness of her male colleagues, especially Thor, to provoke jealousy from Hank and get him to commit to a relationship. Early on in her Avengers career, she is seriously wounded by a stray bullet in battle against Count Nefaria, and nearly dies from a collapsed lung. She leaves the team several issues later. When she returns in The Avengers #26, her shrinking powers have progressed to the point where she no longer needs Pym particle capsules to use them.

Though Janet hopes on several occasions that her long-term boyfriend Hank will propose, their relationship does not move forward to that point until something more dramatic happens. The new vigilante Yellowjacket breaks into the Avengers mansion, demands to be admitted as a member of the team, claims to have killed Hank Pym, and then kidnaps Janet. Not believing that Yellowjacket was Hank's killer, she attempts to find where Yellowjacket is holding Hank, but instead determines that Yellowjacket is her boyfriend. Before revealing this, and during the period in which Yellowjacket still believes himself to have killed Hank, Janet marries Hank, though the wedding is disrupted by an attack from the Circus of Crime. During the fight, it is revealed that Yellowjacket is Pym.

=== 1970s ===
After another departure from the team, Janet van Dyne returns briefly and becomes a member of the original Lady Liberators, before once more leaving the team. She becomes temporarily trapped at insect size, and battles Whirlwind, Para-Man and Doctor Nemesis. She also battles Equinox alongside Spider-Man and Yellowjacket; during this time her powers are augmented to allow her to harness her body's bio-electrical current and fire blasts of energy which she calls "wasp's stings".

During one of her breaks from active Avengers duty, Janet approaches the team with concerns about her husband having suffered a breakdown and attacked former teammates. In attempting to find a way to help Hank, she is captured by a brainwashed Hank, and used by Ultron as a template to create Jocasta. She is rescued when Jocasta alerts the Avengers to her location, and Black Panther suggests that the A.I.'s ability to reach out to them was brought about because of Janet's personality breaking through.

=== 1980s ===
Janet van Dyne discovers that her husband, now paranoid, overbearing and verbally abusive, has concocted a plan to make himself look good in front of the Avengers by staging an attack that can only be stopped by the instigator. When she attempts to dissuade him, Hank strikes her; she divorces him soon after and takes a very brief break from the team.

When Janet returns to the Avengers, she proposes that the team is in need of new leadership and nominates herself for the role of chairperson. She is elected to the position by Thor, Iron Man, and Captain America. Janet takes to the role naturally, proving to be an efficient and smart leader who is praised by Captain America for her leadership skills. She makes it a point to increase the number of women on the team and recruits She-Hulk and Captain Marvel (Monica Rambeau).

At the same time as taking on leadership of the team, Janet begins to work in earnest as a professional fashion designer. Part of her friendship with She-Hulk includes designing new clothing for her. She also renews her social life, engaging in a whirlwind romance with Tony Stark before learning that the billionaire is Iron Man. She breaks off the relationship, saying that she cannot date a colleague who is also a friend of her ex-husband. Later, she has a relationship with Paladin, though they are often apart due to their jobs.

Janet briefly hands leadership of the team off to the Vision, though he soon leaves the team and returns the position to her. The new team line-up proves difficult, and Janet clashes with Hercules taking issue with a woman leading. It is during this time that she meets the Space Phantom for the second time and defeats the villain. During the first Secret War, despite being the official leader of the Avengers gathered by the Beyonder, Janet nominates Captain America for leadership of the assembled heroes as the non-Avengers present know him better. As the conflict unfolds, Janet is briefly captured by Magneto, but she turns the situation to her advantage by pretending to be seduced; she learns Magneto's plans and then defeats him before leaving to alert the Avengers. She is shortly afterwards killed by the Wrecking Crew, but resurrected by the alien healer Zsaji.

During the Under Siege storyline, Janet leads the team during a time when they are attacked from all sides. She defeats Titania and the Absorbing Man, then leads a team against Baron Zemo's Masters of Evil to rescue Captain America, the Black Knight, and other team members who have been captured. Shortly after the resolution of this story, she steps down from leadership once more, succeeded by Monica Rambeau in that position. After leaving the team, she battles the threat of Red Ronin by herself. She later joins the West Coast Avengers. Initially, she still acts as though the team leader, to the chagrin of other West Coast Avengers who desire that role. During this time, she resumes a romantic relationship with Hank. Although she is elected as a regular member of the Avengers West, Janet chooses to become a reserve member.

=== 1990s ===
Several years later, Janet van Dyne returns to the Avengers, first at reserve status, and later as a full member of the team. During the Destiny War, the Janet of the present becomes the leader of a team of Avengers assembled from different time periods, cited as being chosen due to her "inner strength and flexibility to give the team direction without exerting too much control". After the Destiny War, Janet returns to work with the Avengers once more, taking up leadership of the team and commanding the team through a number of conflicts, including Kang the Conqueror's invasion of Earth.

=== 2000s ===
Janet van Dyne once more takes up leadership of the Avengers and continues to make sure there is a strong female presence on the team. Under her leadership, the number of women on the team outnumbers the number of men for the first time in Avengers history. Though her relationship with Hank Pym remains strong for some time, she turns down his proposal of remarrying, saying she wouldn't marry him again. During the "Lionheart of Avalon" storyline, Janet is shown fighting the Wrecking Crew while at giant size, a power she had rarely, if ever, used prior. She is shown to be powerful enough at this size to take down a jet. She has a brief fling with fellow team member Hawkeye.

==== JLA/Avengers ====
Janet van Dyne is shown as a member of the Avengers and aids them during the battle with Starro. She also gives Iron Man the idea to create a dimensional alarm and rallies other Avengers to defend the artifacts. After the final battle in the Savage Land against the Justice League, Janet ends up as an Avenger in the new merged world that the villain Krona created and is unaware of the changes. In this world she and Hank are good friends with Elongated Man and his wife Sue Dibny. When the two teams decide to team up against Krona, the Wasp fights alongside the Avengers until the battle is over.

==== Avengers Disassembled ====
While discussing her fling with Hawkeye, with the Scarlet Witch, a slightly tipsy Wasp confesses to a pregnancy scare and inadvertently mentions Wanda Maximoff's own children, whose unnatural existence Agatha Harkness has erased from the Witch's memory. Wasp's slip of the tongue, combined with Scarlet Witch's increasingly unstable and growing powers, cause Wanda to suffer a mental breakdown which leads to the events of Avengers Disassembled. Janet is knocked into a coma by a rampaging She-Hulk during an attack on Avengers Mansion by the Scarlet Witch. Hank Pym watches over her in the hospital, and when she recovers, they reconcile. The two retire from the Avengers to pursue a new life together in Oxford.

==== Beyond! ====
Janet van Dyne is pulled into space and placed in a situation where she is expected to fight to the death with other heroes and villains. Instead of following the wishes of the Stranger—who they thought to be the Beyonder—Janet falls into the leadership position for the group, giving tactical orders in battle and calling upon her years of experience with the Avengers to handle the threats thrown at them. After tension between her and her ex-husband, Janet explains to Medusa why she cannot reconcile with Hank Pym, despite an attempt to do so while in London. Upon learning that the Space Phantom has impersonated Spider-Man, Janet leads the group and keeps one of the team from being trapped in limbo.

==== Civil War ====
During the superhuman Civil War, Janet van Dyne is pro-registration and suggests that they push forward the fifty-state initiative to get things under control after Ragnarok (the cyborg clone of Thor) kills Bill Foster, an event which upsets her greatly. She also becomes the host of a pro-registration reality TV show called America's Newest Superhero.

==== Mighty Avengers ====
Janet van Dyne is selected as a member of the Mighty Avengers by Carol Danvers and Tony Stark as part of the Fifty State Initiative. During its attempt to destroy humanity, she correctly determines that Ultron has taken over Iron Man's body. When alien symbiotes attack New York, Janet uses a refined growth formula given to her by Hank Pym—who is actually a Skrull impostor—which allows her to shift to giant-size without side effects. During the beginning of the fight, she is briefly turned into a symbiote monster before a cure is created by Stark.

==== Secret Invasion ====
Janet van Dyne is among the Mighty Avengers who are fighting heroes from the Skrull ship. She is later seen with the rest of the Avengers heading to New York to confront the Skrulls. While fighting the Skrulls, the true purpose of the serum that the Skrull Hank Pym has given her is revealed. After Queen Veranke is thought to be dead, the Skrull imposter presses a button that makes Janet increase in size rapidly, as well as causes her to emit lethal amounts of black-purple energy. Janet realizes that the "new" particles Pym has given her are turning her into a bio-bomb, and she tries to flee the battlefield and take as many Skrulls with her as possible when she explodes. To save both the city and heroes, Thor uses the enchanted hammer Mjolnir to create a spatial warp to seemingly disperse Janet into nothingness. Thor is devastated by the act and vows to avenge her. Upon accepting Janet's death, Hank Pym takes up his ex-wife's role as the Wasp.

=== 2010s ===
Following the Avengers vs. X-Men storyline, it is revealed that Janet was transported to the Microverse by Thor's spatial warp. Using her Avengers communication card, she sends a signal that enables the Avengers to rescue her. In the process, they liberate the Microverse from its tyrannical leader, Gouzar.

Following a brief hiatus, Janet returns to the team as a member of the Avengers Unity Squad. In addition to serving on the roster, she privately funds the team to avoid the problems that would come with government sponsorship. During the events of Inhumanity, Janet returns to the Microverse to rescue a family who has been pulled there through a newly awakened Inhuman's powers. There she confronts Gouzar once more, before returning to normal space. In the Avengers Unity Squad's fight with the Horsemen of Death, the Wasp defeats both the resurrected Banshee and Sentry, using both her ability to grow to giant size as well as her ability to control insect life. After the team is defeated and the Earth destroyed, Wasp is the last surviving human and begins a romance with Havok (Alex Summers) with whom she has a daughter named Katie. Years later on Planet X, she is captured when she and Havok destroy a tachyon dam preventing time travel to their era. They are able to undo the destruction of Earth by forming an alliance with Kang and projecting their minds back into their past selves (physical time-travel still being impossible) but Kang takes their daughter to a place outside of time to 'protect' her from the changes in history, Kang subsequently attempts to use Katie as a hostage to force Havok to stop attacking him when he tries to take the Celestial power for himself, departing with Katie as his prisoner. Although Alex is left disfigured after the battle, he and Janet remain together. They are contacted by Immortus informing them that Immortus can return their daughter to them if they take action at the right time and place to conceive her, but he also warns them about the imminent threat posed by the Red Skull.

After the Red Skull's actions cause all heroes and villains present at his defeat to undergo a 'moral inversion', Alex attempts to argue for Janet's life as the X-Men prepare to detonate a gene bomb that will destroy all non-mutants in the blast radius, but accepts the decision nevertheless. After Carnage sacrifices himself to contain the blast, Alex attempts to take credit for it, but Janet sees through the deception. Although the inversion is undone, the two separate for good when Alex is one of three characters (the other two being Iron Man and Sabretooth) to remain in their new state.

As part of the All-New, All-Different Marvel, Wasp confronts Wolverine (X-23) and her clones called The Sisters when they try to steal an Ant-Man suit. Wolverine explains what they are doing, so Wasp agrees to shrink down and destroys the nanites in Zelda's body. While Wasp and Wolverine made their way through Zelda's body, Captain Mooney of Alchemax Genetics shows up and shoots Zelda causing Wasp and Wolverine to exit the body. The two of them knock out Captain Mooney.

Wasp later caught up with the Uncanny Avengers and confronted Ultron Pym after helping to fend off the monsters in the subway. When Wasp asked Ultron Pym about the recent events, she figured out that Ultron is in control of Hank when Ultron guessed wrong. The rest of the Uncanny Avengers were informed of this causing Cable to pressure Hank enough for Ultron to go on the attack and reveal his true self.

Janet was called by Tony Stark to help him analyze the brain waves of Jocasta, since they were based on Janet's herself, after finding the data they went on a date and rekindled their past relationship after fending off malfunctioning robots attacking Stark Unlimited. Wasp later helps defeating The Controller after he took over the virtual reality eScape and empowered various criminals throughout the city, and also directly aids Iron Man in subduing the supervillain Sudurang. During the "Ultron Agenda" arc, Wasp and Iron Man are suddenly attacked by a fusion of Vision and Wonder Man created by Ultron, who is trying to kidnap her, while Iron Man fends off the fusion, Wasp is found and captured by a brain-washed Jarvis and is taken to Ultron's base, who reveals to her he is now fused with her ex-husband Hank Pym. Ultron later has Jocasta captured as well and reveals he is planning to combine both Jan and Jocasta in the same body the same way he did with Pym, therefore creating his "Perfect wife", he is found by Iron Man and Machine Man before he activates his procedure, and cause him to have a mental breakdown through continued taunting, Ultron activates his machine but both Jan and Jocasta are saved by Iron Man who is fused with his armor in the process, Dr. Shapiro finds a way to revert Iron Man's condition but Ultron sends a miniature version on himself to infiltrate Iron Man's body who's engaged by Wasp, gaining enough time for Iron Man to expel everything from his body and return to normal. Wasp later helps fend off an enraged Ultron who's trying to kill everyone with his army of machine-fused human army, Iron Man uses his newly developed technology to separate the robotic parts from the organic ones to stop Ultron's army and scare him off. Janet tries to comfort Tony after he finds out he is actually an A.I. before he flies away.

Wasp later appears as a member of the Agents of Wakanda.

Wasp and Nadia were later attacked by Whirlwind who was hired by W.H.I.S.P.E.R. and the Creature from the Kosmos. They defeated Whirlwind who offered to tell them who hired him in exchange for protection. Whirlwind did not get protection as he was killed in his cell by a mysterious person.

Mayor Luke Cage dispatched Wasp to the Raft to investigate the murders there. When the dead bodies came back to life and attacked Wasp, she is saved by Whirlwind whose dead body is possessed by an artificial personality named Victor Shade. She plans to keep an eye on "Victor".

== Powers and abilities ==
Making use of the cellular implantation of sub-atomic Pym particles, the Wasp possesses the power to alter her physical size, causing her body's mass to be shunted to or gained from an alternate dimension known as Kosmos. She is able to shrink to a minimum of several centimeters or grow to a maximum of several hundred feet. Smaller or larger sizes are possible but the exertion puts a strain on her body. Initially, these abilities stem from use of a Pym particle gas released from special capsules, and later biochemical augmentation by Hank Pym. Over time, however, her body absorbs enough particles to cause cellular mutation due to repeated exposure to Pym particles, allowing her to alter her size at will.

At miniature size, her strength level increases as her body's mass is compacted. At giant size, her strength and endurance increase geometrically with her height, reaching superhuman levels.

At miniature size, the Wasp grows a pair of translucent insect wings from her back, a result of genetic modifications provided by Hank Pym. These grant her the power of flight, at speeds up to 40 mph (64 km/h).

The Wasp is able to harness and augment her body's natural bio-electric energy, releasing it from her hands in powerful electrical force bursts, which she calls her "stinger blasts", "stingers", or "wasp's stings". Originally, she requires special wrist devices to produce these, but again, Pym particle absorption allows her to create the ability unaided.

The Wasp's genetic modifications also grant her the ability to sprout small prehensile antennae from her temples which allowed her to telepathically communicate with and control insects. However, this is an ability she rarely uses.

Van Dyne displays several non-superhuman abilities. In many of her appearances, she sports a new costume, which she presumably designs and manufactures herself. She is also a skilled amateur screenwriter. The Wasp is trained in unarmed combat by Captain America and in combat using her special powers by Hank Pym. In addition, the Wasp is one of the most intuitive, if not deductive, members of the Avengers, and is an experienced leader and strategist. She effectively determines that a chemical accident has created a schizophrenic break in Hank and that the relationship between the Scarlet Witch and the Vision is the result of the infused personality of Wonder Man, and guesses Iron Man's identity of Tony Stark.

== Critical reception ==
George Marston of Newsarama referred to the Wasp as one of the "best female superheroes," writing, "Though she started as something of a sidekick to her on-again-off-again (currently off-again) paramour Hank Pym, Janet quickly became a hero in her own right, leading the Avengers several times, and often acting as the team's moral center. Wasp's arc has consistently projected upwards, quickly leaving behind any semblance of being a 'damsel in distress,' and progressing to the top levels of Marvel's heroic roster. Add to that her historical significance, and it's easy to see why she's one of the greatest female heroes ever to grace the printed page." Rob Bricken of Gizmodo asserted, "If Captain America epitomizes the Avengers, Janet Van Dyne is still its heart and soul. She was a founding member, has led the team through some of its most difficult moments, and has the unequivocal respect of gods, robots, and the most powerful beings in the cosmos. Marvel actually put it best when it said if the Avengers were asked to rank themselves, The Wasp would likely be #1." IGN stated, "Superhero comics were still lacking for strong female characters in the mid '60s. The Wasp was one of the ladies at the forefront of the feminist superhero movement. At first merely a bubbly sidekick to her husband, Giant-Man, Wasp quickly grew and built a career of her own. She remained one of the core Avengers members for much of the franchise's history, and her extensive wardrobe rivals even the likes of Wolverine's."

== Other characters named Wasp ==
=== Hank Pym ===
After Janet van Dyne's apparent death, Dr. Henry "Hank" Pym was the second Wasp and joined the Mighty Avengers as their leader. After founding the Avengers Academy, Pym helped the Avengers to rescue Janet from the Microverse.

=== Nadia van Dyne ===
It was revealed that Hank Pym had a daughter named Nadia through Maria Trovaya who was abducted and supposedly killed by foreign agents. This caused Nadia to be raised in the Red Room until the day she obtained a Pym Particle sample that enabled her to escape. Originally known as Nadia Pym, she later adopts the Van Dyne surname from her husband Hank's ex-wife Janet.

== Other versions ==
Many alternate universe versions of Wasp have appeared throughout the character's publication history.

=== Earth-11045 ===
On Earth-11045, a reality depicted in Secret Avengers, Wasp utilizes Deathlok technology.

=== Earth-71490 ===
On Earth-71490, Janet van Dyne is a fashion designer and employer of Cooper Coen / Web-Weaver.

=== Earth-20051 ===
Janet van Dyne as Giant-Girl. From Marvel Adventures: The Avengers #13 (July 2007). Art by Leonard Kirk.

On Earth-20051, setting of Marvel Adventures: The Avengers, Janet van Dyne is known as Giant-Girl.

=== Marvel Mangaverse ===
In the Marvel Mangaverse, Wasp is an employee of Stark Industries whose wings are made of plasma.

=== Ultimate Marvel ===
In the Ultimate Marvel universe, Wasp is a mutant and a member of the Ultimates who has innate stinging abilities and insect-like behavior.

=== Ultimate Universe ===
In the Ultimate Universe imprint, Janet van Dyne is an exterminator who goes on to join the Ultimates.

== In other media ==
=== Television ===
- The Janet van Dyne incarnation of the Wasp appears in The Marvel Super Heroes, voiced by Peg Dixon.
- An alternate universe version of Janet van Dyne / Wasp makes a cameo appearance in the X-Men: The Animated Series episode "One Man's Worth". This version became a servant of Apocalypse.
- The Janet van Dyne incarnation of the Wasp makes a cameo appearance in the Fantastic Four episode "To Battle the Living Planet".
- The Janet van Dyne incarnation of the Wasp appears in The Avengers: United They Stand, voiced by Linda Ballantyne.
- The Janet van Dyne incarnation of the Wasp appears in The Super Hero Squad Show, voiced by Jennifer Morrison.
- The Janet van Dyne incarnation of the Wasp appears in The Avengers: Earth's Mightiest Heroes, voiced by Colleen O'Shaughnessey.
- The Janet van Dyne incarnation of the Wasp appears in Marvel Disk Wars: The Avengers, voiced by Kaori Mizuhashi in the Japanese dub and Colleen O'Shaughnessey in the English dub.
- The Janet van Dyne incarnation of the Wasp appears in Marvel Future Avengers, voiced by Kaori Mizuhashi in Japanese and Kari Wahlgren in English.
- The Janet van Dyne incarnation of the Wasp appears in Spidey and His Amazing Friends, voiced by Maya Tuttle.

=== Film ===
- Janet Pym / Wasp appears in Ultimate Avengers and Ultimate Avengers 2, voiced by Grey DeLisle.
- Janet van Dyne / Wasp makes a non-speaking cameo appearance in Next Avengers: Heroes of Tomorrow. This version was killed by Ultron prior to the film.

=== Marvel Cinematic Universe ===
Janet van Dyne / Wasp appears in media set in the Marvel Cinematic Universe (MCU):

- Joss Whedon, director of the live-action film The Avengers, originally wanted to cast Zooey Deschanel as the Wasp. However, the character was ultimately cut from the film.
- Janet first appears in a flashback in the live-action film Ant-Man, voiced by Hayley Lovitt. This version operated as a S.H.I.E.L.D. agent alongside her husband Hank Pym who, in an attempt to stop a missile, shrunk down to the Quantum Realm and was presumed dead for decades.
- Janet appears in the live-action film Ant-Man and the Wasp, portrayed by Michelle Pfeiffer. After making a connection with Scott Lang following his own trip to the Quantum Realm, Janet assists him, Hank, and their daughter Hope van Dyne in finding and rescuing her. Upon their reunion, Janet reveals that her extended time there caused her to absorb large amounts of quantum energy. Once out of the realm, Janet temporarily stabilizes Ghost before working with Lang and her family to gather more quantum energy to create a permanent cure. However, Janet, Hank, and Hope fall victim to the Blip.
- Janet appears in the live-action film Avengers: Endgame, in which she is restored to life off-screen and attends Tony Stark's funeral.
- An alternate timeline variant of Janet appears in the Disney+ animated series What If...? episode "What If... Zombies?!" This version was infected with a quantum virus that transformed her into a zombie. When Hank traveled to the Quantum Realm to rescue her, she infected him and they went on to cause a zombie apocalypse following their return. She returns in Marvel Zombies, as part of the Red Queen's army. She is killed by Valkyrie during the attack on Infinity Hulk.
- Janet appears in the live-action film Ant-Man and the Wasp: Quantumania. During her time in the Quantum Realm, she worked with Kang to restore his ship's power core until she learned of his intent to conquer the multiverse and sabotaged the power core before she was rescued by her family. Following an accident that transports Janet, her family, Scott, and Cassie Lang to the Quantum Realm, the five help its inhabitants overthrow Kang before escaping the realm once more.

=== Video games ===
- The Janet van Dyne incarnation of the Wasp appears as a non-player character (NPC) in Captain America and The Avengers.
- Janet van Dyne appears in Spider-Man: The Sinister Six, voiced by Natalie Shirer.
- The Janet van Dyne incarnation of the Wasp appears as a playable character in Marvel Super Hero Squad Online.
- The Janet van Dyne incarnation of the Wasp appears as a playable character in Marvel Avengers Alliance.
- The Janet van Dyne incarnation of the Wasp appears as a playable character in Lego Marvel Super Heroes, voiced by Tara Strong.
- The Janet van Dyne incarnation of the Wasp appears as a NPC in Disney Infinity 2.0, voiced again by Colleen O'Shaughnessey.
- The Janet van Dyne incarnation of the Wasp appears as a team-up character in Marvel Heroes, voiced again by Colleen O'Shaughnessey.
- The Janet van Dyne incarnation of the Wasp appears as a playable character in Lego Marvel's Avengers.
- The Janet van Dyne incarnation of the Wasp appears as playable character in Marvel: Future Fight.
- The Janet van Dyne incarnation of the Wasp appears as a playable character in Marvel Avengers Academy, voiced by Alexandra Daddario.
- The Janet van Dyne incarnation of the Wasp appears in Lego Marvel Super Heroes 2, voiced by Skye Bennett.
- The Janet van Dyne incarnation of the Wasp appears as a playable character in Marvel Ultimate Alliance 3: The Black Order, voiced by Kari Wahlgren.

=== Miscellaneous ===
- A scientist attending Otto Octavius's demonstration in Spider-Man 2, portrayed by Joanne Baron, is identified as Janet van Dyne in the film's novelization.
- Janet van Dyne / Wasp appears in the Eternals motion comic, voiced by Kelly Sheridan.
