= The Avengers: Earth's Mightiest Heroes =

American superhero animated series

- Genre: Action; Adventure; Crossover; Superhero; Science fantasy; Comedy drama
- Based on: Avengers by: Stan Lee; Jack Kirby
- Developed by: Ciro Nieli; Joshua Fine; Christopher Yost
- Voices of: Brian Bloom; Chris Cox; Jennifer Hale; Peter Jessop; Phil LaMarr; Eric Loomis; James C. Mathis III; Colleen O'Shaughnessey; Fred Tatasciore; Rick D. Wasserman; Wally Wingert
- Narrated by: Alex Désert (opening narration; season 2)
- Theme music composer: Guy Erez; David Ari Leon
- Opening theme: "Fight As One" by Bad City
- Ending theme: "Fight As One" (instrumental)
- Composer: Guy Michelmore
- Country of origin: United States
- Original language: English
- No. of seasons: 2
- No. of episodes: 52 (list of episodes)

Production
- Executive producers: Alan Fine; Eric S. Rollman; Dan Buckley; Simon Phillips (season 1); Jeph Loeb (season 2)
- Producer: Dana C. Booton
- Editors: Jonathan Polk; Steve Ingram; George Rizkallah; Robert Walz
- Running time: 22 minutes
- Production companies: Film Roman; Marvel Animation

Original release
- Network: Disney XD
- Release: September 22, 2010 – November 11, 2012

Related
- The Avengers: United They Stand; Avengers Assemble; Wolverine and the X-Men

The Avengers: Earth's Mightiest Heroes is an American superhero animated series produced by Marvel Animation in cooperation with Film Roman based on the Marvel Comics superhero team. The first season debuted on Disney XD on September 22, 2010. The second season was one of the inaugural shows of the Marvel Universe programming block alongside Ultimate Spider-Man. The series originally features a team based on the roster for the original Avengers, consisting of Iron Man, the Hulk, Thor, Ant-Man, and Wasp. The team is later joined by Captain America, Black Panther, and Hawkeye in the first season, and Ms. Marvel and Vision in the second.

In terms of overall tone and style, the series is based on the original stories by Stan Lee and Jack Kirby. The series also uses material from all eras of the comic's run as well as other sources, such as the Marvel Cinematic Universe.

== Synopsis ==
The original Avengers. From left to right: Ant-Man / Giant-Man, Iron Man, the Hulk, Wasp, and Thor

=== Season one ===
Following a mass prison breakout at the Vault, the Cube, the Big House, and the Raft, Earth's mightiest heroes unite to form the Avengers, a team comprising Iron Man, Captain America, Thor, the Hulk, Ant-Man, Wasp, Black Panther, and Hawkeye. The Avengers battle various supervillains including Baron Zemo, the Leader, Kang the Conqueror, and Ultron, as well as the criminal organizations Hydra and A.I.M. It is ultimately revealed that Loki orchestrated the breakout and had the Enchantress form the Masters of Evil to distract the Avengers as part of his scheme to conquer the nine realms, including Asgard.

=== Season two ===
Following Loki's defeat, the Avengers are joined by Ms. Marvel and the Vision as they hunt down the remnants of the Masters of Evil and face new enemies including Doctor Doom, the Red Hulk, and the Red Skull, as well as alien threats such as the Skrulls, the Kree, and Galactus. The season alludes to a developing storyline in which Surtur escapes Muspelheim and gathers strength to oppose the Avengers as a prelude to Ragnarök.

Numerous other Marvel Comics characters make guest appearances, such as Spider-Man, Wolverine, Ant-Man (Scott Lang), the Heroes for Hire, the Guardians of the Galaxy, Daisy Johnson (Quake), Beta Ray Bill, Falcon, and Winter Soldier.

== Episode list ==
Season	Episodes	Originally aired	
Season	Episodes	Season premiere	Season finale
1	26	September 22, 2010	June 26, 2011
2	26	April 1, 2012	November 11, 2012

== Cast ==
- Eric Loomis – Tony Stark / Iron Man
- Brian Bloom – Steve Rogers / Captain America
- Rick D. Wasserman – Thor, Absorbing Man, Surtur
- Fred Tatasciore – Hulk, Graviton, Mandrill, Red Hulk, Thing, Volstagg, Yon-Rogg, Kalum Ro
- James C. Mathis III – T'Challa / Black Panther, Bulldozer, King Cobra
- Wally Wingert – Hank Pym, MODOK
- Colleen O'Shaughnessey – Janet Van Dyne / Wasp, Cassie Lang, Vapor
- Chris Cox – Clint Barton / Hawkeye, Crimson Dynamo, Fandral, Rattler
- Jennifer Hale – Carol Danvers / Ms. Marvel, Corrina
- Peter Jessop – Vision
- Phil LaMarr – J.A.R.V.I.S., Wonder Man

== Crew ==
- Joshua Fine – Supervising producer
- Vinton Heuck – Director
- Sebastian Montes – Director
- Jamie Simone – Casting and voice director
- Christopher Yost – Story editor, writer
- Ciro Nieli - Supervising director (season 1)
- Frank Paur - Supervising director

== Production ==
=== Development ===
Josh Fine and a number of other creators of The Avengers: Earth's Mightiest Heroes were initially developing a series based on the Hulk. However, it never made it past the scripting stages, with the team instead creating a new series based on the Avengers.

=== Production ===
Marvel announced in October 2008 that its Marvel Animation division and the outside studio Film Roman would produce an Avengers animated TV series, The Avengers: Earth's Mightiest Heroes, for planned broadcast in 2010. Fifty-two episodes were confirmed as being in production. The show's executive producers include Simon Philips and Eric S. Rollman. Joshua Fine serves as supervising producer and Christopher Yost serves as story editor on the show. A 20-part micro-series debuted on September 22, 2010, on Disney XD, focusing on each hero's backstory and the events that lead to the main series. The series started airing on Marvel's sister network, Disney XD in the United States on October 20, 2010, and on Teletoon in Canada on October 22, 2010, in English and March 2011 in French. According to Jeph Loeb, season 2 would presumably begin around October 2011, same as season 1 and producer Josh Fine tweeted in April 2011 that 13 episodes were completed.

At the 2011 New York Comic-Con, Loeb contradicted his earlier statement of season 2 launch in late 2011. Loeb announced at the panel at New York Comic-con that "Avengers Season 2 will be coming in early 2012 (to coincide with Ultimate Spider-Man)." This date would later be clarified as April 1, 2012. Dong Woo Animation, Lotto Animation, and Noxxon Enterprise produced the series' animation.

==== Changes in Second Season ====
Due to changes among executives in the direction of the second half of the 2nd season (specifically the episodes after the Secret Invasion adaptation), the series producers received new orders from Man of Action Entertainment that altered the development of the show and some ideas were moved to the cancelled 3rd season. Various characters were considered to appear in the series, including Nova, Silver Surfer, Sentry, Hercules, Morgan le Fay, Taskmaster, Scarlet Witch, Quicksilver, and Doctor Strange, but were cut.

- According to producer Josh Fine, due to executive changes during the second season, a planned multi-season story arc involving the Red Skull was compressed into the season's second half. Other ideas were to present the Winter Soldier in a more lethal, although less powerful way.
- Thus as it was considered that the story of Unlimited Ultron and his robotic replacement plan was introduced very soon after the Skrull invasion with a similar story, wishing that this arc had been carried over to later seasons.
- In an original script of "Powerless", Loki (having severe facial injuries from the Midgard Serpent's acid) was revealed to be imprisoned in a corner of Yggdrasil, and Amora the Enchantress had freed herself from Surtur's possession and was serving him with free will, as well as Ms Marvel and not Iron Man being one of the villains' targets to lose their powers. In addition to Odin having a scene where he lost his eye and would be replaced by Kurse, while Amora would accuse Loki of trying to betray him for wanting to use his powers for his own plans to conquer Asgard instead of contributing to Ragnarok.>
- The Spider-Man who appears in the series was originally supposed to be the same version of The Spectacular Spider-Man, with Josh Keaton reprising the role, but he was replaced with Drake Bell, who voiced the character in Ultimate Spider-Man.
- Christopher Yost stated that it was originally planned to adapt the "Emperor Doom" comic arc (with the appearance of Wonder Man and the Scarlet Witch), which became the episode "Emperor Stark". He even sold copy ot the original script for such episode.
- It was originally intended to make the season 2 finale a 3-part one where the Avengers would further explore Planet Hala (capital of the Kree Empire) after defeating the Supreme Intelligence, having a final confrontation against Galactus there instead of on Earth.
- At the same time, that season finale would have originally made the New Avengers episode happen after Operation Galactic Storm, replacing the causes of their formation because the Avengers were on the other side of the universe and not because Kang took them out of time. Yellowjacket and Spider-Man would have been searching for Sentry (who was originally supposed to have been introduced in "Assault on 42" and have an episode focused on in it).
- Josh Fine stated that in such finale season arc, Princess Ravonna would have awakened from her stasis in Reed Richards' laboratory and would be seeking to free Kang with Solomon's Frogs, caused because The Avengers collapsed the Kree wormhole and prevented the destruction of Earth's sun, which prevented the event that destroyed the future Earth of Kang's timeline. Due to script changes by orders from above (Man of Action Studios and Jeph Loeb), the Ravonna thread was left pending, so later, when Christopher Yost was working on the comics for the series, he decided to address it as a seed for a possible 3rd season.

=== Cancellation ===
The Avengers: Earth's Mightiest Heroes was not renewed for a third season and was succeeded by a new Avengers show called Avengers Assemble in 2013. On July 14, 2012, at the 2012 Marvel Television Presents panel at San Diego Comic-Con, Jeph Loeb, head of Marvel Television, said of the relationship between the two shows:

We're not in any way saying Earth's Mightiest Heroes never happened. You will see an epic conclusion. And then you'll say, 'Oh, what's next?'

The only voice actors to reprise their roles for Avengers Assemble are Fred Tatasciore and James Mathis as the Hulk and Black Panther, respectively. Additionally, Drake Bell returned to voice Spider-Man for guest appearances, while the other members of the team share their voices with their counterparts in the Ultimate Spider-Man.

=== Future plot details ===
Following the 10-year anniversary of the series' premiere, story editor Christopher Yost published a series of now-deleted Twitter posts outlining a hypothetical third season. These tweets, which Yost described as "what if" scenarios rather than officially planned content, included references to adapting major Marvel teams and storylines including Strange Tales, the West Coast Avengers, the X-Men, The Evolutionary War, and House of M. Following that, in a series of since-deleted Tweets, Yost also discussed what he might have included in seasons thereafter, mentioning a possible two-part fourth season including adaptations of The Infinity Gauntlet and Acts of Vengeance, or a possible fifth season based on Secret Wars.

Since the series' cancellation, character design supervisor Thomas Perkins published fan art of characters from the series in his book IF.... These designs have since fueled speculation regarding whether these character may have been considered for future seasons.

While accepting that it would still be unlikely, Yost and Fine have discussed their renewed interest in continuing the series.

== Release ==
=== Home media ===
DVD/Blu-ray name	Region 1	Region 2	Region 4
Heroes Assemble!	April 26, 2011	July 25, 2011	September 14, 2011
Captain America Reborn	April 26, 2011	August 22, 2011	December 1, 2011
Iron Man Unleashed	October 25, 2011	April 2, 2012	March 7, 2012
Thor's Last Stand	October 25, 2011	April 30, 2012	May 2, 2012
The Complete First Season	April 17, 2012	April 30, 2012	August 1, 2012
Secret Invasion	September 25, 2012	May 6, 2013	March 6, 2013
End of the Cosmos	February 19, 2013	June 13, 2013	
The Complete Second Season	May 7, 2013		April 3, 2013
The Complete First and Second Season		September 29, 2014	

== Reception ==
=== Critical response ===
On the review aggregator Rotten Tomatoes, the first season has a 100% approval rating with an average rating of 7.50 out of 10 based on 5 reviews.

Allan Scoot of Screen Rant stated that The Avengers: Earth's Mightiest Heroes featured impressive animation and writing, updating the classic origins of the Avengers while faithfully introducing key members such as Captain America, Iron Man, Thor, and others. He praised the series for offering a comic-accurate and entertaining portrayal of Marvel's superhero team. Scoot found the series unfortunate to be cut short after two seasons to make way for Avengers Assemble, but noted that it still provided fans with a standout take on the Avengers, complete with a memorable theme song, making it a notable entry in the genre of Avengers cartoons. Will Wade of Common Sense Media gave The Avengers: Earth's Mightiest Heroes a grade of 3 out of 5 stars. He found the show to be action-packed, with numerous super-powered battles resulting in significant destruction but few injuries. Wade praised the series for its engaging plotting and character development, appealing to both teens and older Marvel fans. He noted the depiction of positive messages and role models, saying that while the villains sometimes appear to gain the upper hand, the Avengers ultimately prevail, showcasing the heroes' bravery in their ongoing mission to protect the world from powerful supervillains. Alex Zalben of MTV ranked The Avengers: Earth's Mightiest Heroes 1st in their "5 Best Avengers Cartoons Of All Time" list, describing it as the best animated Avengers series to date, despite being the most recent. He highlighted its faithfulness to the comics, its fun and ambitious nature, and its successful blend of large storylines and a vast array of Marvel characters. Zalben stated that the series works well for both kids and adults, and not only considered it the best Avengers cartoon, but possibly one of the best Marvel animated shows of all time.

Jonathon Dornbush and Joshua Rivera of Entertainment Weekly ranked The Avengers: Earth's Mightiest Heroes 4th in their "9 Best Animated TV Series Drawn From Comics" list, stating that it gave Marvel's superhero team the proper animated treatment, showcasing many heroes and villains who had not yet appeared in films, though they anticipated all would eventually be featured. They praised the show for its well-constructed team dynamic, creating a core cast that felt both familiar and fresh, complementing the live-action Marvel properties at the time. Dornbush and Rivera noted that there was still much to appreciate in the show's 52 episodes, making it a worthwhile revisit, especially during the long waits between live-action Avengers films. Trey Pasch of MovieWeb ranked The Avengers: Earth's Mightiest Heroes 2nd in their "Best Marvel Animated Projects" list, noting that, despite its two-season run, the show earned some of the highest ratings of any Marvel animated series. Pasch praised the show's unique lineup, which began with Iron Man, Giant Man, Hulk, Thor, and Wasp, with additional characters like Captain America and Black Panther joining later. He highlighted how the show adapted popular storylines, such as the "Avengers: Breakout" arc by Brian Michael Bendis in the first season, and an overarching plot involving Loki as the main villain. Michael Doran of Newsarama ranked The Avengers: Earth's Mightiest Heroes 10th in their "10 Best Comic Book Animated Series Of All Time" list, praised it as one of the newest and most impactful Avengers cartoons, noting that the show made a strong impression in its first season. He highlighted the show's structure, with solo episodes that gradually led to the team coming together in a significant way. Doran described the series as possibly the purest Avengers cartoon, filled with heroes working together, over-the-top villainous threats, and big action. He also appreciated the overall sense of happiness in the show, adding that its catchy theme song was unforgettable, often lingering in viewers' minds until the next episode began.

=== Accolades ===
The Avengers: Earth's Mightiest Heroes was nominated for Best Sound Editing: Television Animation at the 2011 Golden Reel Awards.

== In other media ==
=== Comic book ===
The Avengers: Earth's Mightiest Heroes comic book series, written by Christopher Yost, and artwork by Scott Wegener, Christopher Jones and Patrick Scherberger was published to accompany the series. It was a four-issue limited series. An ongoing comic book series titled The Avengers: Earth's Mightiest Heroes Adventures debuted in April 2012, alongside the Ultimate Spider-Man Adventures series. Christopher Yost returned as the main writer, with Adam Dekraker serving as the comic's creative team, while Nuno Plati provided artwork.
