= List of film sequels by box-office performance =

This is a list of film sequels and their performance at the box office. All grosses are given in unadjusted US dollars.

For the tables presented below, determining what constitutes a film series and where a film fits in with the series is subjective. Box Office Mojo and The Numbers list 12 Star Wars films released, including anthology films such as Rogue One (2016) and Solo: A Star Wars Story (2018) (which Box Office Mojo also groups separately), and Star Wars: The Clone Wars, but excluding films such as Caravan of Courage: An Ewok Adventure (1984) and Ewoks: The Battle for Endor (1986). For the purpose of the tables presented here, the films of the "Skywalker saga" are considered as a separate series and are ordered based on the date of release rather than by their number (for example, Star Wars: Episode I – The Phantom Menace was the fourth film released). Similarly, the Marvel Cinematic Universe is listed on the above websites as consisting of 23 films released however, these are also listed separately as 4 Avengers films, 3 Iron Man films, 3 Captain America films, 3 Thor films and so on; for these tables, the films have similarly been treated as separate series. A similar approach has been taken to the Wizarding World series (where the films are split between the Harry Potter film series and the Fantastic Beasts film series); the X-Men film series (where there are separate film series for Wolverine and Deadpool); Star Trek (where there are separate film series for Star Trek: The Original Series, Star Trek: The Next Generation and a later reboot); and the multiple Spider-Man, Batman and Planet of the Apes film series.

† Background shading indicates films still playing at their latest box office update

== Box-office improvement ==
While sequels usually gross less than the original, some have significantly outperformed their predecessors at the box office.

=== Relative improvement ===
These film sequels outgrossed their predecessors by at least a factor of three. The list is not adjusted for inflation.

Title	Year	Gross	Title (predecessor)	Year (predecessor)	Predecessor's gross	Improvement (%)	Improvement ($)
The Boondock Saints II: All Saints Day	2009	$10,629,321	The Boondock Saints	1999	$30,471	34783%	$10,598,850
Jumanji: Welcome to the Jungle	2017	$964,496,193	Zathura: A Space Adventure (Note: The Numbers includes Zathura: A Space Adventure in the Jumanji franchise, whereas Box Office Mojo does not.)	2005	$65,079,104	1382%	$899,417,089
Desperado	1995	$25,405,445	El Mariachi	1992	$2,040,920	1145%	$23,364,525
Wolf Warrior 2	2017	$870,325,439	Wolf Warrior	2015	$81,411,331	969%	$788,914,108
Mad Max: Fury Road	2015	$375,709,470	Mad Max Beyond Thunderdome	1985	$36,230,219	937%	$339,479,251
Clerks II	2006	$26,984,975	Clerks	1994	$3,151,130	756%	$23,833,845
Tron: Legacy	2010	$400,062,763	Tron	1982	$50,000,000	700%	$350,062,763
The Color of Money	1986	$52,293,982	The Hustler	1961	$7,600,000	588%	$44,693,982
Terminator 2: Judgment Day	1991	$516,950,043	The Terminator	1984	$78,371,200	560%	$438,578,843
Cube 2: Hypercube	2002	$3,563,603	Cube	1997	$565,727	530%	$2,997,876
Blade Runner 2049	2017	$259,239,658	Blade Runner	1982	$41,473,619	525%	$217,766,039
K.G.F: Chapter 2	2022	$159,887,058	K.G.F: Chapter 1	2018	$33,000,000	385%	$126,887,058
Austin Powers: The Spy Who Shagged Me	1999	$312,016,928	Austin Powers: International Man of Mystery	1997	$67,683,989	361%	$244,332,939
Jurassic World	2015	$1,670,400,637	Jurassic Park III	2001	$368,780,809	353%	$1,301,619,828
Detective Chinatown 2	2018	$544,185,156	Detective Chinatown	2015	$125,842,935	332%	$418,342,221
Top Gun: Maverick	2022	$1,495,696,292	Top Gun	1986	$357,288,178	319%	$1,138,408,114
Jumanji: Welcome to the Jungle	2017	$962,102,237	Jumanji	1995	$262,821,940	266%	$699,280,297
Mary Poppins Returns	2018	$349,546,142	Mary Poppins	1964	$103,082,380	239%	$246,463,762

=== Absolute improvement ===
These film sequels outgrossed their predecessors by at least $500 million. The list is not adjusted for inflation.

Title	Year	Gross	Title (predecessor)	Year (predecessor)	Predecessor's gross	Improvement (%)	Improvement ($)
Ne Zha 2	2025	$2,150,000,000	Ne Zha	2019	$726,225,471	196%	$1,423,774,529
Jurassic World	2015	$1,670,400,637	Jurassic Park III	2001	$368,780,809	353%	$1,301,619,828
Star Wars: The Force Awakens	2015	$2,068,223,624	Star Wars: Episode III – Revenge of the Sith	2005	$868,390,560	138%	$1,199,833,064
Top Gun: Maverick	2022	$1,495,696,292	Top Gun	1986	$357,288,178	319%	$1,138,408,114
Jumanji: Welcome to the Jungle	2017	$964,496,193	Zathura: A Space Adventure	2005	$65,079,104	1382%	$899,417,089
Spider-Man: No Way Home	2021	$1,914,098,795	Spider-Man: Far From Home	2019	$1,131,927,996	70%	$789,919,115
Wolf Warrior 2	2017	$870,325,439	Wolf Warrior	2015	$81,411,331	969%	$788,914,108
Avengers: Endgame	2019	$2,797,800,564	Avengers: Infinity War	2018	$2,048,359,754	37%	$749,440,810
Furious 7	2015	$1,515,047,671	Fast & Furious 6	2013	$788,679,850	92%	$726,367,821
Jumanji: Welcome to the Jungle	2017	$962,102,237	Jumanji	1995	$262,821,940	266%	$699,280,297
Avengers: Infinity War	2018	$2,048,359,754	Avengers: Age Of Ultron	2015	$1,402,805,868	46%	$645,553,886
The Dark Knight	2008	$1,004,934,033	Batman Begins	2005	$373,413,297	169%	$631,520,736
Incredibles 2	2018	$1,242,805,359	The Incredibles	2004	$631,606,713	97%	$611,198,646
Iron Man 3	2013	$1,214,811,252	Iron Man 2	2010	$623,933,331	95%	$590,877,921
Toy Story 3	2010	$1,066,969,703	Toy Story 2	1999	$497,374,776	115%	$569,594,927
Star Wars: Episode I – The Phantom Menace	1999	$1,027,082,707	Star Wars: Episode VI – Return of the Jedi	1983	$475,347,111	116%	$551,735,596
Skyfall	2012	$1,108,561,013	Quantum of Solace	2008	$589,580,482	88%	$518,980,531

== Highest-grossing sequels ==
Rank	Title	Year	Worldwide gross
1	Avengers: Endgame	2019	$2,925,917,026
2	Spider-Man: Brand New Day	2026	$2,506,251,053
3	Avatar: The Way of Water	2022	$2,322,902,023
4	Star Wars: The Force Awakens	2015	$2,056,046,835
5	Avengers: Infinity War	2018	$2,048,158,241
6	Ne Zha 2	2025	$2,001,155,094
7	Spider-Man: No Way Home	2021	$1,921,206,586
8	Zootopia 2	2025	$1,870,309,209
9	Inside Out 2	2024	$1,698,831,782
10	Jurassic World	2015	$1,671,063,641

== See also ==
- Highest grossing film franchises and film series
