= Captain America in other media =

Marvel Comics character Captain America's appearances in other media

Adaptations of Captain America in other media
- Original source: Comics published by Marvel Comics
- First appearance: Captain America Comics #1 (March 1941)

Print publications
- Novel(s): Captain America: The Great Gold Steal (1968); Captain America: Holocaust For Hire (1979); Captain America: Liberty's Torch (1998); The Death of Captain America (2014); Captain America: Dark Design (2016)

Films and television
- Film(s): Captain America (1944); Captain America (1979); Captain America II: Death Too Soon (1979); Captain America (1990); Captain America: The First Avenger (2011); Captain America: The Winter Soldier (2014); Captain America: Civil War (2016); Captain America: Brave New World (2025)
- Television show(s): The Marvel Super Heroes (1966); The Falcon and the Winter Soldier (2021)

Theatrical presentations
- Play(s): Marvel Universe Live!

Games
- Video game(s): Captain America in: The Doom Tube of Dr. Megalomann (1987); Spider-Man and Captain America in Doctor Doom's Revenge (1989); Captain America and the Avengers (1991); Captain America: Super Soldier (2011)

Since the 1940s, the comic book character Captain America has been presented in a wide variety of other media, including serial films, feature films, animations, and video games.

== Film ==
In the 1960s, when Captain America was an outdated WW2-era comic hero, Peter Fonda used the figure in his 1969 road movie Easy Rider in which his character is said to perform motorcycle stunts as Captain America, wearing stars&stripes on helmet, jacket and the gas tank of the shiny Harley chopper that itself became known as ″Captain America″. The original movie bikes were already stolen in 1968, and copies were made since the 1990s.

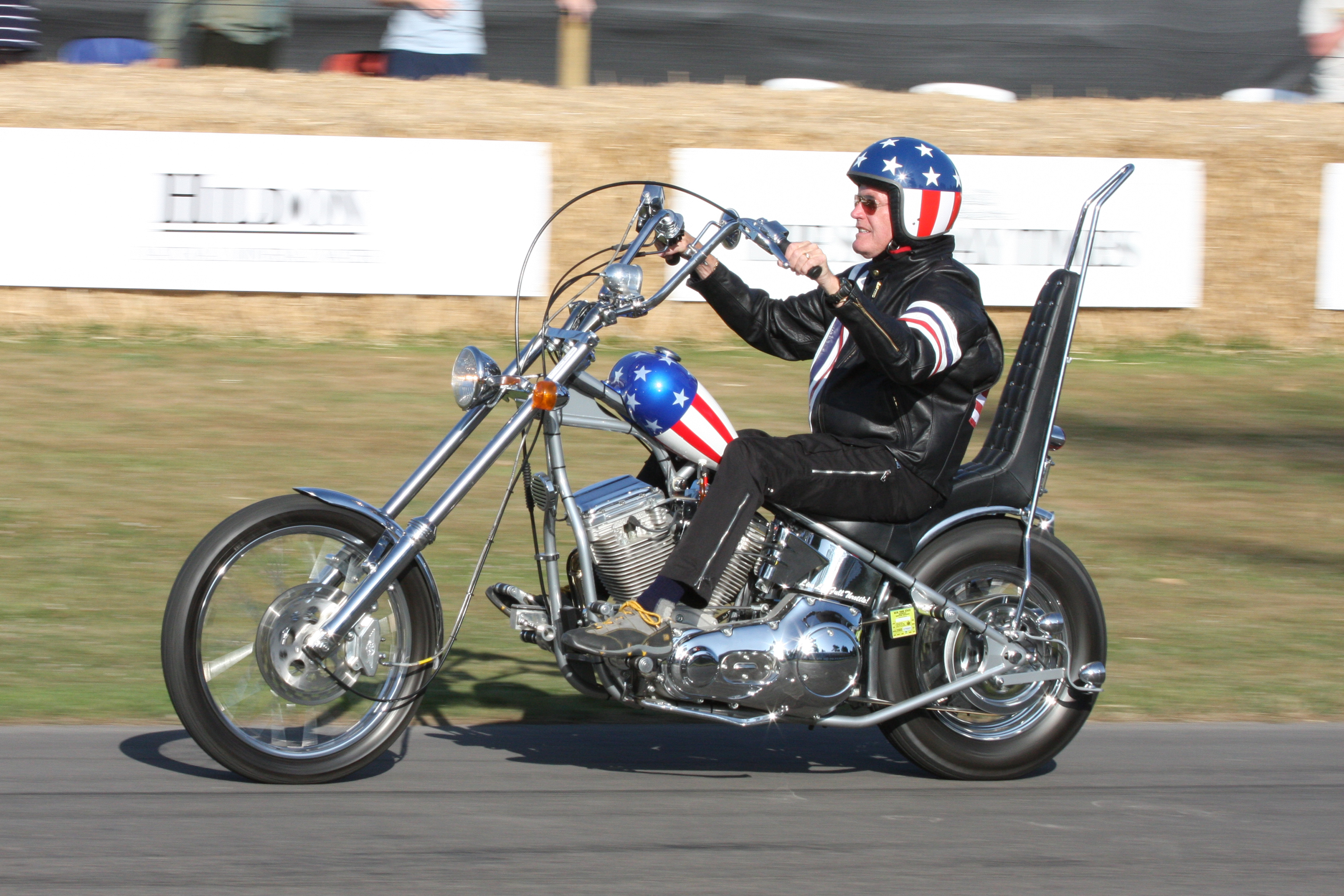
Peter Fonda riding a Easy Rider ″Captain America″ replica chopper at the Goodwood FoS in 2009

== Television ==
=== 1960s ===
Captain America, as he appeared in the 1966 animated television series The Marvel Super Heroes.

- Captain America appears in a self-titled segment of the 1966 The Marvel Super Heroes, voiced by Bernard Cowan.

=== 1980s ===
- Captain America appears in the Spider-Man episode "The Capture of Captain America", voiced by George DiCenzo.
- Captain America appears in Spider-Man and His Amazing Friends, voiced again by George DiCenzo.
- Captain America appears in a 1980 public service announcement on energy conservation, in which he battled the Thermal Thief, the Wattage Waster, and the Cold Air Crook.

=== 1990s ===
- Captain America appears in X-Men: The Animated Series, voiced by Lawrence Bayne. This version previously worked with Wolverine to rescue a scientist kidnapped by the Red Skull and the Nazis.
  - An alternate version of Captain America appeared in the episode "One Man's Worth". In a timeline in which Charles Xavier was murdered before founding the X-Men, Captain America is the leader of a task force of superhuman mutant hunters fighting a war against Magneto's Mutant Resistance.
- Captain America appears in Spider-Man: The Animated Series, voiced by David Hayter. This version was trapped in a dimensional machine alongside the Red Skull during the end of World War II, before being freed in the present day.
- Captain America makes non-speaking cameo appearances in Fantastic Four.
- Captain America appears in The Avengers: United They Stand episode "Command Decision", voiced by Dan Chameroy.
- In the 1990s, a planned Captain America animated series from Saban Entertainment to air on Fox Kids proposed that Captain America's true name was Tommy Tompkins, with "Steve Rogers" being a cover name assigned by the U.S. Army. The Red Skull would appear as the main antagonist. The series was cancelled in pre-production due to Marvel's bankruptcy.

=== 2000s ===
- Captain America appears in the X-Men: Evolution episode "Operation Rebirth". This version suffered cellular breakdown due to a defect in the super soldier serum, forcing him to be put into stasis until a cure can be found. Additionally, he previously worked with Wolverine to liberate a POW camp, where he saves a boy named Erik Lehnsherr, the future Magneto.
- Captain America appears in The Super Hero Squad Show voiced by Tom Kenny. This version is a member of the titular group who is heavily nostalgic for the 1930s and 1940s, and occasionally even forgets he is no longer in them.

=== 2010s ===
- Captain America appears in the pilot episode of Black Panther, voiced by Adrian Pasdar.
- Captain America appears in The Avengers: Earth's Mightiest Heroes, voiced by Brian Bloom. This version becomes the leader of the Avengers.
- Captain America appears in Lego Marvel Super Heroes: Maximum Overload, voiced by Roger Craig Smith.
- Captain America appears in Marvel Disk Wars: The Avengers, voiced by Kazuhiro Nakaya in the original Japanese version and again by Roger Craig Smith in the English dub.
- Captain America appears in Lego Marvel Super Heroes: Avengers Reassembled, voiced again by Roger Craig Smith.
- Captain America appears in Marvel Super Hero Adventures: Frost Fight!, voiced by Matthew Mercer.
- Captain America appears in Marvel Future Avengers, with Kazuhiro Nakaya and Roger Craig Smith reprising their roles in the Japanese and English dubbed versions from Marvel Disk Wars: The Avengers and various Marvel media respectively.
- Captain America appears in Marvel Super Hero Adventures, voiced by Michael Daingerfield.

=== 2020s ===
- Captain America appears in Lego Marvel Avengers: Climate Conundrum, voiced again by Michael Daingerfield.
- Captain America appears in Lego Marvel Avengers: Loki in Training, voiced again by Michael Daingerfield.
- Captain America appears in Lego Marvel Avengers: Time Twisted, voiced again by Michael Daingerfield.
- A mural graffiti of the Steve Rogers incarnation appears in the Disney Television Animation series Moon Girl and Devil Dinosaur (2023). The Sam Wilson incarnation of the character makes a non-speaking cameo appearance in the episode "Today, I Am a Woman" and "Shoot for the Moon".
- Captain America appears in X-Men '97, voiced again by Josh Keaton.
- Captain America appears in Lego Marvel Avengers: Mission Demolition, voiced again by Roger Craig Smith.
- Captain America appears in Spidey and His Amazing Friends, voiced again by Roger Craig Smith.

=== Marvel Animation ===
- Captain America appears in Ultimate Spider-Man, voiced primarily by Roger Craig Smith, while Chris Cox voices him in the episode "Guardians of the Galaxy".
- Captain America appears in Avengers Assemble, voiced again by Roger Craig Smith.
- Captain America appears in Hulk and the Agents of S.M.A.S.H., voiced again by Roger Craig Smith. Additionally, an alternate timeline variant of the character appears in the episode "Days of Future Smash: The Hydra Years".
- Captain America appears in Guardians of the Galaxy, voiced again by Roger Craig Smith.
- Captain America appears in Spider-Man (2017), voiced again by Roger Craig Smith.

=== Marvel Cinematic Universe ===
- The Marvel Cinematic Universe version of Captain America briefly appears via stock footage in the pilot episode of Agents of S.H.I.E.L.D. In November 2013, Jed Whedon, the co-creator of Agents of S.H.I.E.L.D., said that there were plans to reference events from Captain America: The Winter Soldier in the show. In March 2014, a promotional logo for Agents of S.H.I.E.L.D. surfaced which features an image of Captain America's shield, teasing the series of episodes dubbed "Uprising".
- In April 2016, ahead of the release of the Captain America: Civil War film and after the final season of Agent Carter, ABC aired an official Marvel documentary entitled Captain America: 75 Heroic Years, exploring Captain America's history and featuring Chris Evans, Stan Lee, Steve Englehart, and more.
- The Sam Wilson incarnation of Captain America appears in The Falcon and the Winter Soldier (2021) and Captain America: Brave New World (2025).
- Alternate universe variants of Steve Rogers / Captain America appear in What If...?, voiced by Josh Keaton.
- An alternate universe variant of Steve Rogers / Captain America appears in a portrait in Norman Osborn's office in Your Friendly Neighborhood Spider-Man.

== Video games ==
- Captain America appears in Captain America in: The Doom Tube of Dr. Megalomann.
- Captain America appears in The Amazing Spider-Man and Captain America in Dr. Doom's Revenge!.
- Captain America appears as a playable character in Captain America and the Avengers.
- Captain America appears as a playable character in the Marvel vs. Capcom series, voiced initially by Cal Dodd and later by Brian Bloom.
- Captain America appears in Spider-Man and Venom: Maximum Carnage.
- Captain America appears in Avengers in Galactic Storm.
- Captain America appears in Venom/Spider-Man: Separation Anxiety.
- Captain America appears as a playable character in Marvel Super Heroes In War of the Gems.
- Captain America appears Spider-Man (2000), voiced by Daran Norris.
- Captain America appears in The Amazing Spider-Man.
- Captain America appears as a playable character in the PSP version of Marvel Nemesis: Rise of the Imperfects.
- Captain America appears as a playable character in Marvel: Ultimate Alliance, voiced by Trev Broudy.
- Captain America appears in Spider-Man: Battle for New York, voiced by Robin Atkin Downes.
- Captain America appears as a playable character in Marvel: Ultimate Alliance 2, voiced by David Kaye.
- Captain America appears as a playable character in Marvel Super Hero Squad and its sequel, voiced by Tom Kenny.
- A Captain America costume is available as downloadable content for LittleBigPlanet, as part of "Marvel Costume Kit 3".
- Captain America appears in Captain America: Super Soldier, voiced by Chris Evans.
- Captain America appears as a playable character in Marvel Super Hero Squad.
- Captain America appears as a playable character in Marvel Super Hero Squad Online.
- Captain America appears as a playable character in Marvel Super Hero Squad: The Infinity Gauntlet.
- Captain America appears as a playable character in Marvel Super Hero Squad: Comic Combat, voiced by Tom Kenny.
- Captain America appears as a playable character in Marvel Avengers Alliance.
- Captain America appears in Captain America: Sentinel of Liberty.
- Captain America appears as a playable character in Marvel Avengers: Battle for Earth, voiced again by Roger Craig Smith.
- Captain America appears as a playable character in Avengers Initiative.
- Captain America appears as a playable character in Marvel Heroes, voiced by Brian Bloom.
- Captain America appears as a playable character in Lego Marvel Super Heroes, voiced again by Roger Craig Smith.
- Captain America appears as a playable character in Marvel Avengers Alliance Tactics.
- Captain America appears as a playable character in Marvel Contest of Champions.
- Captain America appears as a playable character in Disney Infinity 2.0, voiced again by Roger Craig Smith.
- Captain America appears in the Captain America: The Winter Soldier tie-in game, voiced again by Roger Craig Smith.
- Captain America appears as a playable character in Marvel Mighty Heroes.
- Captain America appears as a playable character on Disney Infinity 3.0, voiced again by Roger Craig Smith.
- Captain America appears as a playable character in Lego Marvel's Avengers, voiced by Chris Evans.
- Captain America appears as a playable character in Marvel: Future Fight.
- Captain America appears as a playable character in Marvel Strike Force.
- Captain America appears in Marvel Avengers Academy, voiced by Dean Panaro.
- Captain America appears as a playable character in Marvel vs. Capcom: Infinite, voiced again by Brian Bloom.
- Captain America appears as a playable character in Marvel Puzzle Quest.
- Captain America appears as a playable character in Lego Marvel Super Heroes 2, voiced by Josh Cowdery. Several variants of the character also appear, including his pilot attire, his "Secret Empire" counterpart, his Wild West counterpart, Capwolf, and Captain Avalon.
- Captain America is parodied as "Captain Steroid" in Hollywhoot: Idle Hollywood Parody.
- Captain America appears as a playable character in Marvel Powers United VR, voiced again by Roger Craig Smith.
- Captain America appears as a playable character in Marvel Ultimate Alliance 3: The Black Order, voiced again by Brian Bloom.
- Captain America appears as a playable character in Marvel Dimension of Heroes, voiced again by Brian Bloom.
- Captain America appears as a purchasable outfit in Fortnite Battle Royale.
- Captain America appears as a playable character in Marvel's Avengers, voiced by Jeff Schine.
- Captain America appears as a playable character in Marvel Future Revolution, voiced again by Brian Bloom. Alternate universe variant of the character appear as NPCs, namely one who led a gladiator rebellion on Sakaar and one who became a thrall of Dormammu.
- Captain America appears as a playable character in Marvel's Midnight Suns, voiced again by Brian Bloom.
- Captain America appears as a playable character in Marvel Rivals, voiced again by Brian Bloom.
- Captain America appears as a playable character in Marvel 1943: Rise of Hydra, voiced by Drew Moerlein.
- Captain America appears as a playable character in Marvel Tōkon: Fighting Souls, voiced by Yuichi Nakamura in Japanese and by Brian Bloom in English.
- Captain America appears as a playable character in Marvel Cosmic Invasion, voiced again by Brian Bloom.

== Motion comics ==
- Captain America appears in the Spider-Woman: Agent of S.W.O.R.D. motion comic, voiced by Jeffrey Hedquist.
- Captain America appears in the Ultimate Hulk vs. Wolverine motion comic, voiced by Trevor Devall.
- Captain America appears in the Wolverine versus Sabretooth motion comic, voiced again by Trevor Devall.
- Captain America appears in the Wolverine: Weapon X motion comic, voiced by Clay St. Thomas.

== Novels ==
Captain America was the subject of Marvel's second foray into prose book licensing: The Great Gold Steal by Ted White in 1968, following an Avengers novel in 1967. This novel presented a different version of Captain America. The novel adds a further element to the Super-Soldier process wherein Rogers' bones are plated with stainless steel. The character later appears in Captain America: Holocaust For Hire by Joseph Silva published by Pocket Books in 1979, and Captain America: Liberty's Torch by Tony Isabella and Bob Ingersoll published in 1998, in which the hero is put on trial for the imagined crimes of America by a hostile militia group.

== Audio and radio ==
- Captain America appears in Power Records' And A Phoenix Shall Arise, an audio dramatisation of Captain America #168 released in 1974. Samples of this record would be used in the Eminem track "Rap God".
- During the 1990s, Shan-Lon Enterprises produced adaptations of Captain America #326, #113 and #255 as part of their Read-Along cassette line.
- Larry Hama's The Death of Captain America was adapted into a full-cast audiobook by GraphicAudio, while Civil War was also adapted by the company.

== Live performances ==
- In 1985, a musical about Captain America was announced for Broadway. The piece, written by Mel Mandel and Norman Sachs, never actually premiered, although recordings of the score have surfaced.
- Captain America was one of the superheroes portrayed in the 1987 live adaptation of Spider-Man and Mary Jane Watson's wedding performed at Shea Stadium.
- Captain America appears in the stage show Marvel Universe Live!.

== Fine arts ==
In July 2016, Marvel and Disney announced that they would be unveiling a 13-foot-tall, one ton bronze statue of Captain America at the 2016 San Diego Comic-Con. The statue, designed by artists at Marvel and Comicave Studios, would tour the United States before its destination in Brooklyn, the character's hometown in the Marvel Cinematic Universe. The statue had a dedication ceremony at Brooklyn's Prospect Park on August 10, 2016, stayed there for two weeks before going to Barclays Center for a month, and has since been on display at a Bed Bath & Beyond complex at Industry City - it does not yet have a permanent home.

Starting with the Pop Art period and on a continuing basis, since the 1960s the character of Captain America has been "appropriated" by multiple visual artists and incorporated into contemporary artwork, most notably by Andy Warhol, Roy Lichtenstein, Mel Ramos, Dulce Pinzon, Mr. Brainwash, and others.

== Intellectual property rights ==
Marvel Comics has held several trademark registrations for the name "Captain America" as well as the distinctive logos used on the comic book series and in the associated merchandising. An application was filed on August 10, 1967, for use in comic books and magazines and a registration was granted by the United States Patent and Trademark Office on August 13, 1968. Marvel's parent company, Disney, received a design patent on Captain America's shield in 2018.

=== Infringement case ===
The Scottish Indie rock band Eugenius was formerly known as Captain America and released the Wow (1991) and Flame On (1992) eps under that name. The threat of legal action by Marvel Comics made the band change its name.
