= Dredmund the Druid =

Fictional comic-book character

Dredmund Druid

Publication information
- Publisher: Marvel Comics
- First appearance: As the Druid: Strange Tales #144 (May 1966); As Dredmund: Captain America #403 (July 1992)
- Created by: Stan Lee; Jack Kirby

In-story information
- Alter ego: Dredmund Cromwell
- Species: Human mutate
- Notable aliases: Druid; Starwolf

Dredmund Druid (Dredmund Cromwell) is a fictional character appearing in American comic books published by Marvel Comics.

Dredmund Druid, also referred to simply as the Druid, appeared as a subversive cult leader with knowledge of alchemy and advanced technology.

== Fictional character biography ==
Dredmund Cromwell is born in Caribou, Maine. As the Druid, he becomes a professional criminal and the leader of a druidic cult. Dredmund attempts to assassinate of Nick Fury, and battles Fury and S.H.I.E.L.D.

Dredmund later abducts Captain America and pits him against a maze of death-traps. He creates the Alchemoid and sets him against Captain America, and then battled Captain America with his followers. Dredmund searches for an ancient book of alchemical secrets at Greymoor Castle. He battles Captain America and Cedric Rawlings, during which he falls into a Z-Ray pit.

In the "Man and Wolf" storyline, Dredmund allies with Doctor Nightshade in a scheme involving transforming ordinary people into pseudo-werewolves. The two battle Captain America, Doctor Druid, Wolverine, Wolfsbane, Werewolf by Night, and Cable. Dredmund uses the Godstone that gave John Jameson his powers to temporarily become the Starwolf. However, Cable destroys the Godstone, returning Dredmund to normal.

== Powers and abilities ==
Dredmund Cromwell gained the ability to mesmerize and control the minds of victims by enhanced powers of hypnosis, from ingestion of various chemical elixirs and potions.

Dredmund has a gifted intellect, and is an expert on ancient druidic lore. He possesses rudimentary knowledge of antinatural chemical properties and advanced knowledge of weapons technology.

Dredmund the Druid sometimes wears light body armor. He has designed a wide variety of weapons thanks to both his knowledge of weapons technology and druidic lore. He uses: grenades containing various druidic potions; a light-absorber harness which renders the wearer invisible to human eyes; body lotion that imparts a hard rough texture to exposed skin, injuring opponents who strike the wearer; soundless egg-shaped high-speed flying craft; alchemically created artificial beings of various elemental body compositions; and various ancient druidic elixirs and potions. He also uses Satan's Eggs, which are egg-shaped attack devices of two types: remote-controlled maneuverable high-speed missiles and robotic ground tanks, both types equipped with various high-technology offensive weaponry including thermo-rays, multiple jet guns, and traction nodules.
