= Man and Wolf =

Story arc of Captain America

- Cover of Captain America #405
- Publisher: Marvel Comics
- Publication date: July – October 1992
- Genre: Superhero
Title(s)
Captain America #402–408
- Main character: Captain America

Creative team
- Writer: Mark Gruenwald
- Penciller: Rik Levins
- Inkers: Danny Bulanadi; Don Hudson; Ray Kryssing; Steve Alexandrov
- Letterer: Joe Rosen
- Colorists: Gina Going; George Roussos
- Editors: Ralph Macchio; Mike Rockwitz

"Man and Wolf" is a story arc that ran in Captain America, an American comic book series published by Marvel Comics, from July to October 1992. It was written by Mark Gruenwald and drawn by Rik Levins, and follows Captain America as he is temporarily transformed into a werewolf. The storyline has achieved a degree of notoriety for its unusual premise.

== Synopsis ==
Captain America teams up with Doctor Druid to investigate the disappearance of John Jameson, formerly the superhero Man-Wolf. Their investigation takes them to a small town in Massachusetts overrun by werewolves controlled by Dredmund the Druid, where Captain America skirmishes with the werewolf-hunting Moonhunter and a brainwashed Wolverine. Captain America is then captured by the supervillain Nightshade, who transforms him into a werewolf.

"Capwolf" finds that he has been captured alongside superheroes with werewolf-like powers, such as Jameson, Wolfsbane, and Werewolf By Night, and leads them to defeat Nightshade. They then face Dredmund, and destroy the magical stone that gives him his powers. Captain America is then suddenly attacked by a doppelganger of himself, (Note: Established in Infinity War #1 as an evil duplicate created by Magus.) whom he defeats after he is given an antidote mid-battle that cures him of his lycanthropy.

== Production and release ==
"Man and Wolf" ran in Captain America from issue #402 (cover dated July 1992) to #408 (October 1992). It was written by Mark Gruenwald and drawn by Rik Levins. A trade paperback collecting the storyline was published by Marvel on January 19, 2011.

The storyline features multiple cameos by Marvel characters, such as Wolverine and Cable; it was a common publishing strategy to include characters from more popular books, such as X-Force and X-Men, in titles like Captain America that had lower sales. The conclusion to "Man and Wolf", which sees Captain America fight his doppelganger, ties the story into the 1992 crossover series The Infinity War.

== Reception and legacy ==
Chris Sims of Comics Alliance described "Man and Wolf" as the "most famous oddity of Gruenwald's tenure" on Captain America and noted its reputation as "one of the most bizarre moments of the core Marvel Universe", but commended it as a "highly enjoyable, insanely over-the-top story".

Capwolf has appeared in various spin-off and licensed media, including as a skin in the video games Marvel's Avengers and Marvel Rivals, and as a Funko Pop. Capwolf & The Howling Commandos, a limited series written by Stephanie Phillips and drawn by Carlos Magno, was published by Marvel in 2023. A 2022 storyline in Captain America: Symbol of Truth in which Joaquin Torres (Falcon) is transformed into a life-sized bird was noted by critics as reminiscent of "Man and Wolf".
