= Top Gun: Maverick =

2022 action drama film by Joseph Kosinski

- Theatrical release poster
- Directed by: Joseph Kosinski
- Screenplay by: Ehren Kruger; Eric Warren Singer; Christopher McQuarrie
- Story by: Peter Craig; Justin Marks
- Based on: Characters by: Jim Cash; Jack Epps Jr.
- Produced by: Jerry Bruckheimer; Tom Cruise; Christopher McQuarrie; David Ellison
- Starring: Tom Cruise; Miles Teller; Jennifer Connelly; Jon Hamm; Glen Powell; Ed Harris; Val Kilmer
- Cinematography: Claudio Miranda
- Edited by: Eddie Hamilton
- Music by: Harold Faltermeyer; Lady Gaga; Hans Zimmer; OneRepublic
- Production companies: Paramount Pictures; Skydance Media; TC Productions; Don Simpson/Jerry Bruckheimer Films (Note: Jerry Bruckheimer Films used the Don Simpson/Jerry Bruckheimer Films logo in memory of Don Simpson, who co-produced the first film.)
- Distributed by: Paramount Pictures
- Release dates: April 28, 2022 (CinemaCon); May 27, 2022 (United States)
- Running time: 130 minutes
- Country: United States
- Language: English
- Budget: $170–177 million
- Box office: $1.503 billion

Top Gun: Maverick is a 2022 American action drama film directed by Joseph Kosinski and written by Ehren Kruger, Eric Warren Singer, and Christopher McQuarrie, from a story by Peter Craig and Justin Marks. It is the sequel to the 1986 film Top Gun, with Tom Cruise reprising his starring role as the naval aviator Pete "Maverick" Mitchell. The ensemble cast also features Miles Teller, Jennifer Connelly, Jon Hamm, Glen Powell, Monica Barbaro, Lewis Pullman, Ed Harris, and Val Kilmer (in his final film role). The story involves Maverick confronting his past while training a group of younger Top Gun graduates, including the son of his deceased best friend, for a dangerous mission.

Development of a Top Gun sequel was announced in 2010 by Paramount Pictures. Cruise, along with co-producer Jerry Bruckheimer and director Tony Scott, were asked to return. Craig wrote a draft of the screenplay in 2012, but the project stalled when Scott died later that year. Top Gun: Maverick was later dedicated to Scott's memory. Production resumed in 2017, after Kosinski was hired to direct. Principal photography, which involved the use of IMAX-certified 6K full-frame cameras, took place from May 2018 to April 2019 in California, Washington, and Maryland. The film's complex action sequences—and later the COVID-19 pandemic—delayed its release, which was initially scheduled for July 12, 2019. During the pandemic, several streaming companies attempted to purchase the streaming rights to the film from Paramount, but all offers were declined on the orders of Cruise, who insisted that it should be released exclusively in theaters.

Top Gun: Maverick premiered at CinemaCon on April 28, 2022, and was theatrically released in the United States on May 27 by Paramount Pictures. The film was widely praised by critics, with many deeming it superior to its predecessor. It was named one of the top ten films of 2022 by the National Board of Review and by the American Film Institute and nominated for six awards at the 95th Academy Awards (including Best Picture), winning Best Sound. Top Gun: Maverick grossed $1.5 billion worldwide, making it the second-highest-grossing film of 2022 and the highest-grossing film of Cruise's career. A sequel is in development.

== Plot ==
More than 30 years after graduating from the Top Gun training school, (Note: As depicted in Top Gun (1986)) United States Navy Captain Pete "Maverick" Mitchell is a decorated test pilot whose insubordination and passion for flying has kept him from flag rank. (Note: Navy Personnel Command stated that a captain with more than 35 years of service like Maverick would be very unusual, but not impossible.) When Rear Admiral Chester "Hammer" Cain plans to cancel Maverick's "Darkstar" scramjet-powered hypersonic aircraft program, Maverick manages to reach the final target speed, but the prototype is destroyed when he cannot resist pushing beyond Mach 10. Cain tells Maverick that Admiral Tom "Iceman" Kazansky, Maverick's friend and former Top Gun rival, now commander of the U.S. Pacific Fleet, has had Maverick reassigned to the Top Gun school at NAS North Island, keeping his career alive for now.

The Navy has been ordered to destroy an unsanctioned uranium enrichment plant in an unnamed foreign country before it becomes operational. The plant, located in an underground bunker at the end of a canyon, is defended by surface-to-air missiles (SAMs), GPS jammers, Su-57 fighters, and F-14 Tomcats. With the GPS spoofing making an attack by the Lockheed Martin F-35 Lightning II unfeasible, Maverick devises a plan employing two pairs of F/A-18E/F Super Hornets armed with laser-guided bombs. However, instead of participating in and leading the mission himself, Maverick is ordered to train elite Top Gun graduates who will complete the mission, assembled by Air Boss Vice Admiral Beau "Cyclone" Simpson, who barely tolerates Maverick's presence in deference to Iceman. Despite having previously failed as an instructor at Top Gun, Maverick accepts his new assignment upon learning it the only way he can continue flying as a naval aviator.

Maverick dogfights with his skeptical students, winning their respect, while talented but cocky and rude Lieutenant Jake "Hangman" Seresin clashes with likable but cautious Bradley "Rooster" Bradshaw—son of Maverick's deceased best friend and radar intercept officer Nick "Goose" Bradshaw. Maverick reunites with former girlfriend Penny Benjamin and reveals his promise to Rooster's dying mother that Rooster would not become an aviator. Rooster, unaware of this, resents Maverick for blocking his Naval Academy application and blames him for Goose's death. Faced with selecting Rooster for the mission, Maverick confides in Iceman, who tells him, "It's time to let go" and reassures him that both the Navy and Rooster need Maverick.

During a simulation exercise, an aircraft crashes due to bird strike, and Rooster confronts Maverick for pulling his application from the Naval Academy. Before Maverick can say anything, he is notified that Iceman has died from terminal cancer and Maverick attends his funeral watching the missing man formation flown in Iceman's honor. In the absence of Iceman, Cyclone removes Maverick as instructor. Believing Maverick's plan is impossible to execute, Cyclone relaxes the mission parameters, allowing for theoretically easier execution but predictably resulting in the pilots' deaths. During Cyclone's announcement, Maverick makes an unauthorized flight through the course, completing it in less time than stated in his original mission parameters, proving it can be done. Despite the insubordination, Cyclone reluctantly appoints him as team leader.

Maverick flies the lead F/A-18E, accompanied by a buddy-lasing F/A-18F (Note: A two-seat F/A-18 points a laser at the target to assist other strike aircraft in dropping their laser-guided bombs, a tactic known as buddy lazing.) flown by Lieutenant Natasha "Phoenix" Trace and weapon systems officer Lieutenant Robert "Bob" Floyd. Rooster leads the second strike pair, which includes Lieutenant Reuben "Payback" Fitch and WSO Lieutenant Mickey "Fanboy" Garcia. The four jets launch from an aircraft carrier, and Tomahawk cruise missiles destroy the enemy air base. The teams destroy the plant, but the SAMs open fire during their escape. Rooster runs out of countermeasures, and Maverick sacrifices his plane to protect him. With Maverick believed dead, all jets are ordered back to the carrier, but Rooster disobeys and returns to find Maverick on the ground being pursued by an Mi-24 attack helicopter. After destroying the gunship, Rooster is shot down by a SAM and ejects. The two rendezvous and commandeer an F-14 from the damaged air base, destroying the landing gear during their takeoff. Maverick and Rooster destroy two intercepting Su-57s, but a third attacks as they run out of ammunition and countermeasures. Hangman, who was the mission's emergency action pilot, unexpectedly arrives in his F/A-18E Super Hornet in time to shoot it down, and the planes return safely to a jubilant flight deck.

Later, Rooster helps Maverick work on his P-51 Mustang. Afterward, Rooster looks at a photo of their mission's success, pinned alongside a photo of his late father and a young Maverick, as Penny and Maverick fly off in the P-51.

== Cast ==
- Tom Cruise as Captain Pete "Maverick" Mitchell: A test pilot and flight instructor, training a group of Top Gun graduates for a specialized mission
- Miles Teller as Lieutenant Bradley "Rooster" Bradshaw: An F/A-18E pilot in the mission training group. He is the son of Maverick's late RIO and best friend, LTJG Nick "Goose", and Carole Bradshaw. Rooster was previously portrayed by twins Aaron and Adam Weis in Top Gun in uncredited roles.
- Jennifer Connelly as Penelope "Penny" Benjamin: Maverick's rekindled love interest, who is a single mother, a bar owner, and the daughter of an admiral (Note: Penny Benjamin's name was given in the previous movie by Goose to identify the "admiral's daughter" mentioned by the air group commander, Commander Tom "Stinger" Jardian, and later Carole Bradshaw, Goose's wife, mentioned Penny Benjamin by name.)
- Jon Hamm as Vice Admiral Beau "Cyclone" Simpson: The commander of Naval Air Forces
- Glen Powell as LT Jake "Hangman" Seresin: An F/A-18E pilot and mission candidate, and Rooster's rival
- Ed Harris as Rear Admiral Chester "Hammer" Cain: Maverick's superior and head of the Darkstar program (Note: Cain's informal nickname is the "Drone Ranger".)
- Val Kilmer as Admiral Tom "Iceman" Kazansky: The commander of U.S. Pacific Fleet, close friend and former rival of Maverick. This was Kilmer's final performance before his death in 2025.
- Lewis Pullman as LT Robert "Bob" Floyd: Phoenix's F/A-18F WSO and mission candidate (Note: According to LT Jake "Hangman" Seresin, perhaps in jest, Floyd's call-sign "Bob" stands for "Baby On Board".)
- Charles Parnell as Rear Admiral Solomon "Warlock" Bates: The commander of the Naval Aviation Warfighting Development Center and an acquaintance of Maverick
- Bashir Salahuddin as Chief Warrant Officer Four Bernie "Hondo" Coleman: A friend of Maverick's
- Monica Barbaro as LT Natasha "Phoenix" Trace: An F/A-18F pilot and mission candidate
- Jay Ellis as LT Reuben "Payback" Fitch: An F/A-18F pilot and mission candidate
- Danny Ramirez as LT Mickey "Fanboy" Garcia: Payback's F/A-18F WSO and mission candidate
- Greg Tarzan Davis as LT Javy "Coyote" Machado: An F/A-18E pilot and mission candidate
- Manny Jacinto as LT Billy "Fritz" Avalone: An F/A-18E pilot and mission candidate
- Raymond Lee as LT Logan "Yale" Lee: An F/A-18F pilot and mission candidate
- Jake Picking as LT Brigham "Harvard" Lennox: Yale's F/A-18F WSO and mission candidate
- Jack Schumacher as LT Neil "Omaha" Vikander: An F/A-18F pilot and mission candidate
- Kara Wang as LT Callie "Halo" Bassett: Omaha's F/A-18F WSO and mission candidate
- Lyliana Wray as Amelia Benjamin: Penny's daughter
- Jean Louisa Kelly as Sarah Kazansky: Iceman's wife
- James Handy as Jimmy: An old bartender at Penny's bar
- Chido Nwokocha as Mission Controller
- Chelsea Harris as Admiral's Aide

Anthony Edwards, Meg Ryan, as well as Aaron and Adam Weis appear as the Bradshaw family in archive footage from Top Gun, along with Kelly McGillis as Charlotte "Charlie" Blackwood.

== Production ==
=== Development ===
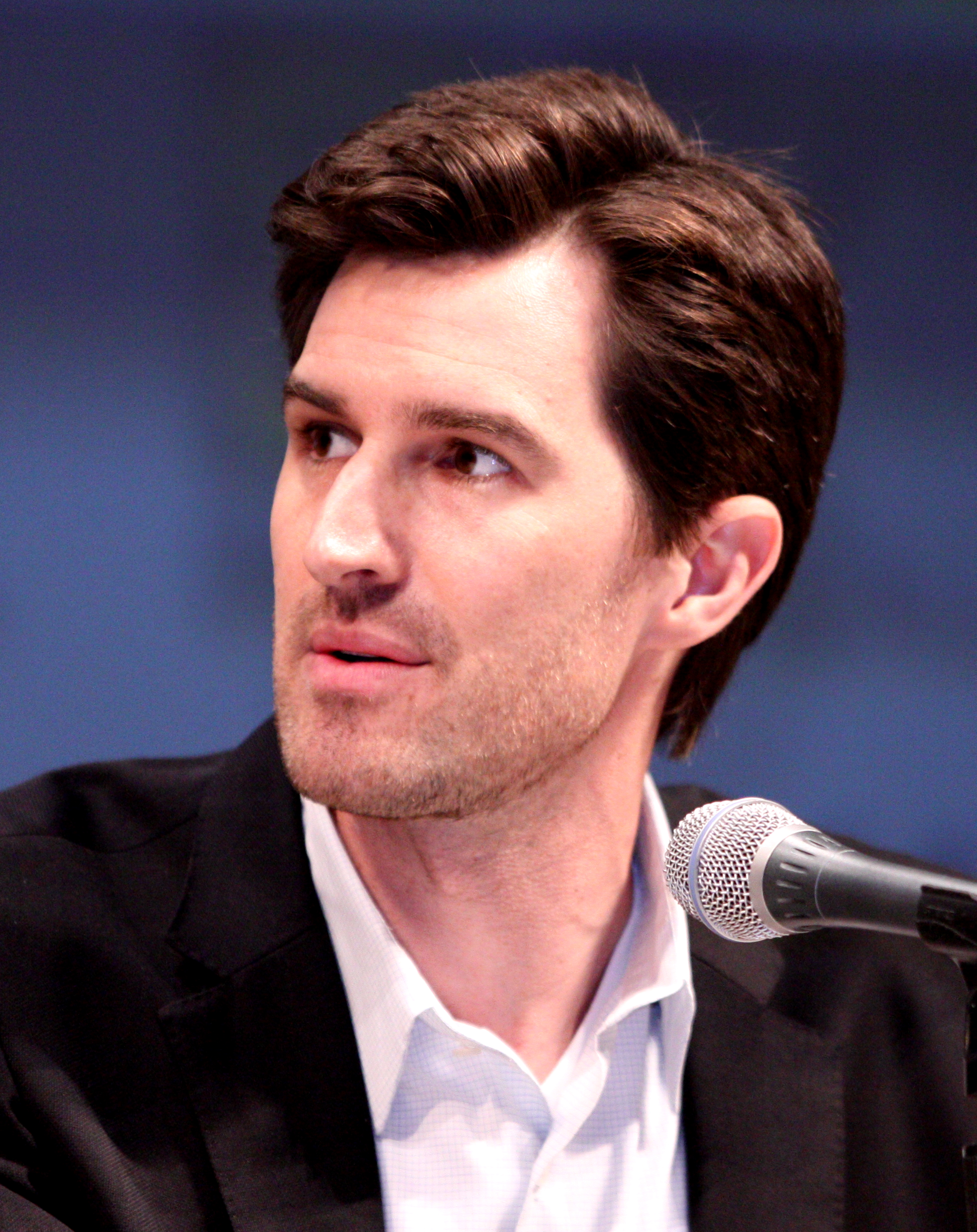
Joseph Kosinski was attached as director in 2017.

In 1990, during the promotion of Born on the Fourth of July (1989), Tom Cruise dismissed the notion of a sequel to Top Gun (1986) as "irresponsible". Paramount Pictures began development on the film in 2010 after making offers to the first film's producer Jerry Bruckheimer and director Tony Scott to create a sequel to Top Gun with Cruise reprising his role. When asked about his idea for a new Top Gun film, Scott replied, "This world fascinated me, because it's so different from what it was originally. But I don't want to do a remake. I don't want to do a reinvention. I want to do a new movie." It was reported that the film would focus on the end of the dogfighting era, the role of drones in modern aerial warfare, and would see Cruise's character, Maverick, fly an F/A-18E Super Hornet. Following Scott's death in 2012, the sequel's future became uncertain, but Bruckheimer remained committed to the project, especially given interest expressed by Cruise and Val Kilmer.

Cruise revealed in June 2017 that the sequel would be titled Top Gun: Maverick, noting that he did not want a number in the title. He added that the film is "going to be a competition film, similar to the first one", but clarified it as "a progression for Maverick". At one point Scott's brother Ridley was approached to direct, although he declined the offer. By July 2017, Joseph Kosinski was announced as the director, after previously collaborating with Cruise on his film Oblivion (2013). Kosinski met with Cruise on the set of Mission: Impossible – Fallout (2018), providing a lookbook, a poster, and a title, Top Gun: Maverick, prior to his hiring. Cruise then contacted Jim Gianopulos and requested to make the film.

In June 2019, at CineEurope in Barcelona, attendees were given a first look at some early footage of the film from a special Paramount presentation which ended with the Paramount President of International Theatrical Distribution Mark Viane and co-president of Worldwide Marketing and Distribution Mary Daily appearing in full flight gear. In 2019, Chinese company Tencent invested 12.5% of the film but later pulled out of the project at the end of that year over concerns that the film's themes could anger the Chinese government.

=== Writing ===
By mid-2010, Christopher McQuarrie received an offer to write the sequel's screenplay, which was rumored to have Cruise's character Maverick in a smaller role. The following year, Ashley Edward Miller and Zack Stentz were credited as screenwriters on the project. The studio would later move onto Peter Craig to draft a new script under Scott's direction in March 2012. However, the project unexpectedly stalled due to Scott's suicide in August of that year. Scott had apparently finalized the script and begun scouting locations with him and Cruise touring Naval Air Station Fallon, Nevada, a week before his death. The Hollywood Reporter said the Top Gun sequel was one of three directing projects in "advanced development". In March 2014, Bruckheimer said the filmmakers were taking a new approach, which involved pilots being rendered obsolete by drones.

In September 2014, the sequel was officially revived. Justin Marks entered negotiations to write the screenplay. Marks said that the sequel to Top Gun was his "dream project" and that the original was "an iconic film in his memory" that inspired him to write screenplays. He researched the F-35 Joint Strike Fighter to gain insight into "how Top Gun would be represented in the current period".

"Maverick in that film was in his early twenties and now he's in his fifties. It had to be a different journey, but it was important it was a journey for a man at a different part of his life. We think of Top Gun as an action film, but I think of it as a drama. It has some incredible action scenes in it, but there is a drama at the center of it."

— Kosinski, on the new script of Top Gun: Maverick

During scripting discussions in Paris in 2017, where Cruise was shooting for Mission: Impossible – Fallout, Kosinski pitched two ideas to Cruise. The first focused on the severed relationship between Maverick and Goose's son, set against a dangerous combat mission. The second focused on Maverick's current place in the Navy as part of the "Darkstar" program and the secrecy surrounding it. With Kosinski in place as director, Eric Warren Singer joined the film to rewrite the script by August 2017, after previously cowriting Kosinski's 2017 film Only the Brave. In October 2018, McQuarrie, a frequent collaborator of Cruise, was brought in for rewrites during production. McQuarrie opted to mostly ignore the first film during the writing process in order to make a film that could stand on its own merits without trying to outdo the original. He also flew with the Blue Angels in preparation. By January 2020, final screenplay credits were given to Ehren Kruger, Singer, and McQuarrie, while story credit was attributed to Craig and Marks.

=== Casting ===
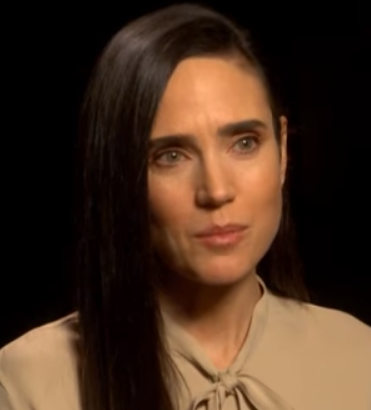
Jennifer Connelly played Cruise's love interest.

Cruise's involvement in Top Gun: Maverick was announced in January 2016. He was paid between $12 and $14 million plus a portion of the film's box office gross, which totaled more than $100 million. Val Kilmer, now cancer-free, had campaigned on his Facebook page to reprise his role from the first film. In June 2018, TheWrap reported that he would appear in the film. Bruckheimer and the filmmakers wanted to bring Kilmer back, especially with Cruise's insistence. A trailer released in March 2022 featured a photograph of Kilmer wearing a uniform of a four-star admiral. In July 2018, Miles Teller was cast in the role of Goose's son, against Nicholas Hoult and Glen Powell. Later that month, Jennifer Connelly joined the film's cast to play a single mother running a bar near the naval base.

In August 2018, Powell joined the cast in a pilot trainee role that was enlarged for him, having impressed Cruise, Bruckheimer, and executives at Paramount and Skydance Media, with his auditions. He was cast as the arrogant "Hangman" (originally named "Slayer" when he read the script). Powell was initially unimpressed by the prospect of taking the role, feeling the character was a unidimensional "dick garnish" and a "Navy Draco Malfoy" with no payoff nor reason to exist other than adding conflict to "Rooster"'s character arc. Cruise, Bruckheimer, Kosinski, and McQuarrie managed to convince him that he could shape his performance to make "Hangman" a more well-rounded character. Cruise advised Powell on body language in different cultures, helping him to play "Hangman" so that global audiences would emotionally connect with the character. In the same month, Monica Barbaro, Thomasin McKenzie, Charles Parnell, Jay Ellis, Bashir Salahuddin, Danny Ramirez, Ed Harris, Jon Hamm, and Lewis Pullman joined the cast of the film; Barbaro, Pullman, Ellis, and Ramirez portrayed aviator trainees, while McKenzie was to portray the daughter of Connelly's character.

Hamm signed onto the film before he was given an official offer or script. In September 2018, Manny Jacinto joined the cast. In October 2018, Kara Wang, Jack Schumacher, Greg Tarzan Davis, Jake Picking, Raymond Lee, Jean Louisa Kelly, and Lyliana Wray joined the cast; Wray replaced McKenzie, who dropped out of the film after signing onto Lost Girls (2020). In November 2018, Chelsea Harris joined the cast. Kelly McGillis, Meg Ryan, and Aaron and Adam Weis, all of whom appeared in the original film, were not asked to appear in the sequel. Top Gun cast members Rick Rossovich and Tom Skerritt, who played Slider and Viper respectively, were asked to return and filmed material for Iceman's funeral scene, but it was ultimately cut.

According to interviews with Vanity Fair and GQ, Lewis Hamilton was offered a fighter pilot role because of his friendship with Cruise but turned down the offer because of his Formula One commitments.

=== Filming ===
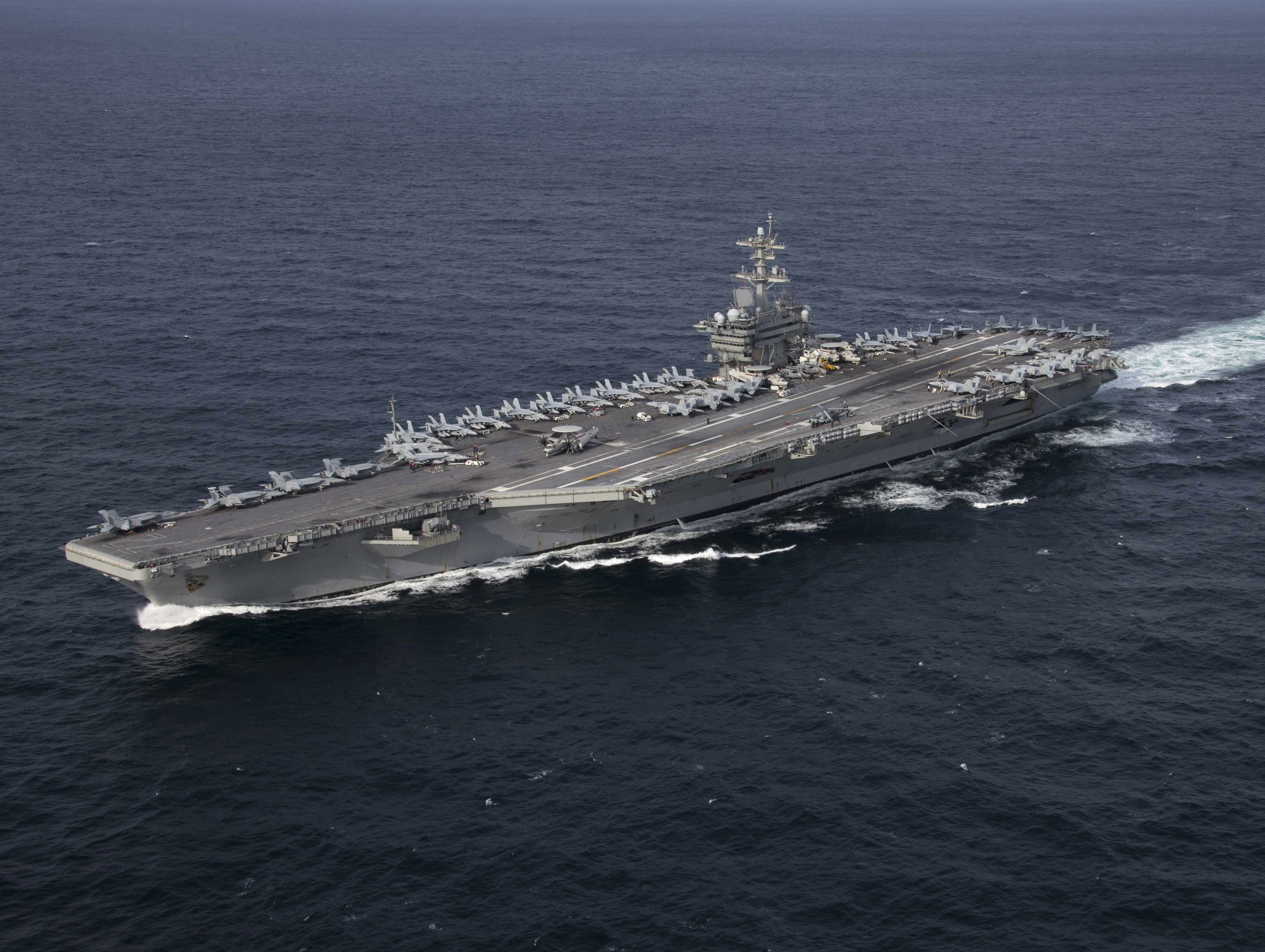
Filming took place on the USS Abraham Lincoln.

To create the illusion that the actors were piloting the jets during flying scenes, the producers paid the Navy $11,374 per flight hour for F/A-18E (single seat) and F/A-18F (dual seat) Super Hornets and pilots to fly them. For external shots, real Navy pilots flew the E version. For shots of the actors in flight, the F version was used with the actual pilot in the front seat. One F/A-18F was rigged with special cameras to film an actor in the back seat. Cruise designed a three-month "boot camp" to train the actors with flying roles to get them used to aerobatics and high g-forces, as well as build the spatial awareness they would need to operate the camera equipment. Some of the training was required by the Navy for passengers in tactical jets, including underwater evacuation. Barbaro said the cast endured aerobatics riding in the Extra 300L flown by Chuck Coleman, including right before flights in the F/A-18F, to ensure their bodies had the required tolerance. She also praised the female pilots she had worked with during the filming process, and commented that while the "military aviation community [is] progressive, there's no way that [sexism] doesn't still exist in little moments here and there. It's par for the course for women in historically male-dominated spaces. So I was glad we kept that in." The actors also had to learn lighting, cinematography, and editing to properly run the cameras, because, according to Bruckheimer "when they're up in the jet, they have to direct themselves, essentially."

Preliminary production on the film officially started on May 30, 2018, in San Diego. Although the real-life Top Gun school had been moved to Naval Air Station Fallon in Nevada since the events of the first film, the story was set in San Diego at Naval Air Station North Island. The crew did film aerial shots at Naval Air Station Fallon. In late August, a 15-person film crew from Paramount and Bruckheimer Films shot flight deck operations aboard the Norfolk-based aircraft carrier USS Abraham Lincoln. In mid-February 2019, Cruise and the production crew were sighted on board USS Theodore Roosevelt at NAS North Island. In March, filming in the Cascade Mountains was completed out of Naval Air Station Whidbey Island in Oak Harbor, Washington, where routes were scouted by helicopter and the L-39 before filming the F/A-18s. In June 2019, Miles Teller revealed in an interview that he had finished filming two days earlier. Principal photography was scheduled until April 15, 2019, in San Diego, Lemoore, China Lake, Chico, and Lake Tahoe in California; Seattle; and Patuxent River, Maryland. The low-pass scene with Ed Harris was filmed at China Lake with flying a Blue Angels plane at less than 50 ft (15 m) around 450 kn (520 mph; 830 km/h), which on the 20th and last pass pulled roofing material from the guard shack flying off held only by romex cable. The post-production and editing works were supervised by Kosinski at his home during the COVID-19 pandemic lockdown.

The film was shot in IMAX format using IMAX-certified Sony Venice 6K full-frame cameras. Kosinski said that the team spent more than a year with Navy forces to use the IMAX cameras inside the cockpit. Four were directed towards the actor and two were faced outwards, accompanied by numerous cameras mounted on the aircraft's exterior. He said "the audience should feel the authenticity, strain, speed and gravitational forces, something that cannot be achieved through soundstage or visual effects, which needed a tremendous amount of effort and work." NAVAIR engineers used wind tunnel testing and computer modeling to rig cameras to the aircraft to withstand the speeds and g-forces sustained during maneuvering and carrier landings while maintaining safety in the event of ejection. The crew shot the aerial footage outside the F/A-18s with gimbal-stabilized cameras on three platforms: a nose-mounted rig on one of two modified Aero L-39 Albatros that could film at 350 kn (403 mph; 648 km/h) and 3 g, nose- and tail-mounted cameras on an Embraer Phenom 300, and a nose-mounted rig on an Airbus AS350 helicopter. More than 800 hours of aerial footage was shot for the film, exceeding the combined footage shot for the films in the Lord of the Rings trilogy.

The set of the Hard Deck bar, inspired by the real-life "I-Bar", was constructed on the beach at Naval Air Station North Island in Coronado, California with permission from the Navy.

=== Aircraft ===
For most of the planes including the F/A-18E/F, the production crew acquired 20 working aircraft from all over the US. Hindle said that Kosinski had made specifications for every detail during design, including the helmets, suits, props, and several others.

==== Darkstar ====
The fictional "Darkstar" aircraft was designed with help from engineers from Lockheed Martin and its Skunk Works division. A full-scale mockup of the aircraft was built and filmed at China Lake. Kosinski said, "The reason we approached Skunk Works is because I wanted to make the most realistic hypersonic aircraft we possibly could. In fact, as you saw, we built it full-scale in cooperation with them. But the reason it looks so real is because it was the engineers from Skunk Works who helped us design it. So those are the same people who are working on real aircraft who helped us design Darkstar for this film." Lockheed denied that Darkstar is related to the uncrewed Lockheed Martin SR-72, whose existence the company has never confirmed.

==== F-14 ====
Production designer Jeremy Hindle said that using a F-14 Tomcat (which is featured in the first film) would have been difficult. "There are no F-14s that fly because they [have been decommissioned in the U.S.] and all the engines have been taken out of them." He said that they were not able to use the active F-14 Tomcats in Iran, the only other country that acquired the aircraft, due to sanctions. The U.S. scuttled or disabled its vast fleet of F-14s once they were retired to prevent the illicit export of spare parts.

With help from the Navy, the production team secured one F-14A from the San Diego Air & Space Museum in California. Hindle described further challenges, including dismantling and shipping the plane's components, and making the aircraft as functional as possible, though still without engines.

=== Post-production ===
Visual effects (VFX) artist Fred Lyn said CGI was used extensively in the film. The F-14 and Su-57 were visualized entirely by computer, while the F/A-18 dogfighting and final strike scenes were shot with a single jet, producing footage that was used to create multiple jets onscreen.

The film had about 2,400 VFX shots, all produced under visual effects supervisor Ryan Tudhope. Most work was done by Method Studios and MPC Film, though Lola VFX and Blind provided the 2D motion graphics, training visualizations, and the jet's head-up displays.

Skywalker Sound worked on sound design and temp mixing for the film. They created aviation sound effects, working closely with GE Aviation, a jet engine manufacturer out of Cincinnati. Final sound editing and mixing in Dolby Atmos and IMAX was handled by London-based Soundbyte Studios and Twickenham Film Studios. Recording mixers Chris Burdon and Mark Taylor worked in two theaters with different audio configurations to complete the mixes, which took place in June and July 2020.

After his treatment and operation for throat cancer, Val Kilmer lost his ability to speak effectively. In 2021, he worked with Sonantic, a UK-based software company that specializes in voice synthesis, to digitally recreate his voice using AI technology and archived audio recordings of his voice. The collaboration with Sonantic led to a successful vocal model program that Kilmer could apply in future projects. For Top Gun: Maverick, however, this technology was not used. Director Joseph Kosinski said in an interview that they used Kilmer's actual voice, digitally altering it to increase clarity.

Footage from the original film was used in a scene where Maverick watches Rooster playing "Great Balls of Fire" on the piano, invoking memories of Goose's family and death. The footage was used as a flashback, to help explain the characters' relationship and to deepen the emotional conflicts involved. This was not planned in the original script; Kosinski introduced the idea in the film editing phase.

In July 2024, actor Manny Jacinto, in regards to having his lines cut from the finished film, said that "Tom Cruise is writing stories for Tom Cruise" and that "There was this sense of where the film was going [on set], like I can see them focusing the camera more on these [other] guys and not taking so much time on our scenes."

== Music ==
Top Gun composer Harold Faltermeyer returned to compose the soundtrack and was joined by Lady Gaga, OneRepublic, and Hans Zimmer. The soundtrack was produced by Lorne Balfe. The soundtrack was released on May 27, 2022, through Interscope Records and Paramount Music. It was promoted by two singles, "Hold My Hand" by Lady Gaga and "I Ain't Worried" by OneRepublic. From the first film, the score also incorporates elements of the original "Top Gun Anthem", and the song "Danger Zone", composed by Giorgio Moroder and sung by Kenny Loggins.

== Marketing ==
The film's first teaser trailer premiered during a surprise appearance by Cruise at San Diego Comic-Con on July 18, 2019. The first trailer received high praise from fans, with many lauding the return of the series and some comparing it to Star Wars: The Rise of Skywalker (2019). The Hollywood Reporter wrote that some fans noticed that the flag of the Republic of China (Note: The flag used by the government of the Republic of China based on the island of Taiwan) and the flag of Japan were missing from the flight jacket of Cruise's character and accused Paramount of removing it to appease China-based co-financier Tencent Pictures. However, the Republic of China and Japanese flags were later restored, as Tencent would end up pulling out of the production, leading to them being uncredited in the final film and, instead, the producers chose to not release the movie in China. The second trailer was released in December 2019, and a new Snapchat filter for the film was introduced by Paramount to engage "young-generation audiences".

In February 2020, toy manufacturer Matchbox announced that it was releasing a series of Top Gun die-cast models and products, including the F-14 Tomcat, F/A-18E/F Super Hornet, and the P-51 Mustang, as well as role-play items. They were scheduled for public release on June 1, 2020, despite the delayed theatrical release. In June 2020, plastic model manufacturer Revell released a series of 1/48 scale Top Gun plastic models, including an F-14A Tomcat and an F/A-18E Super Hornet based upon the aircraft in the movie. These are versions of previous Revell offerings with modified decals and markings. In July 2020, Hasbro announced a Top Gun-themed Transformers toy, "Maverick", which was released later in the year. Hasbro later re-released the toy as a Walmart exclusive to tie into the film's final release date.

On August 26, 2021, the first 13 minutes of the film were previewed at CinemaCon along with a new trailer with Cruise marking his presence virtually at the event. In January 2022, CBS Sports released a new clip from the film, coinciding with the AFC Championship Game between the Kansas City Chiefs and the Cincinnati Bengals. In February 2022, the final trailer of the film tied to Porsche was aired before Super Bowl LVI. In April 2022, Project ACES, the developers of the Ace Combat series, announced the release of an aircraft collaboration DLC for Ace Combat 7: Skies Unknown (2019) with Top Gun: Maverick, released on May 26, a day before the film's release. A free expansion based on Top Gun: Maverick was also released for Microsoft Flight Simulator on the same day, containing the F/A-18E/F Superhornet and fictional "Darkstar" planes as playable aircraft. An interactive website was also launched on the same month. On May 23, Cruise collaborated with The Late Late Show host James Corden for recreating a fighter sequence as a part of promotions.

A three-week promotional tour was conducted in Mexico City, Tokyo, Cannes, London, San Diego and Los Angeles. Event Cinemas announced Top Gun: Maverick Collector Combo, featuring a medium large salt-popcorn with refreshments in a collector cup, being marketed with stills featuring Cruise. Other marketing deals were arranged with Applebee's restaurant chains and Vudu.

In Japan, the movie collaborated with Umamusume: Pretty Derby, naming the personification of the racehorse Mayano Top Gun as a special advertising pilot. It included Mayano Top Gun as Maverick in an alternate version of the movie poster. Four of their voice actresses – including Mio Hoshitani, who plays Mayano Top Gun – also attended the Japanese premiere in Yokohama as part of Paramount's event coverage and met Cruise and Jerry Bruckheimer.

== Release ==
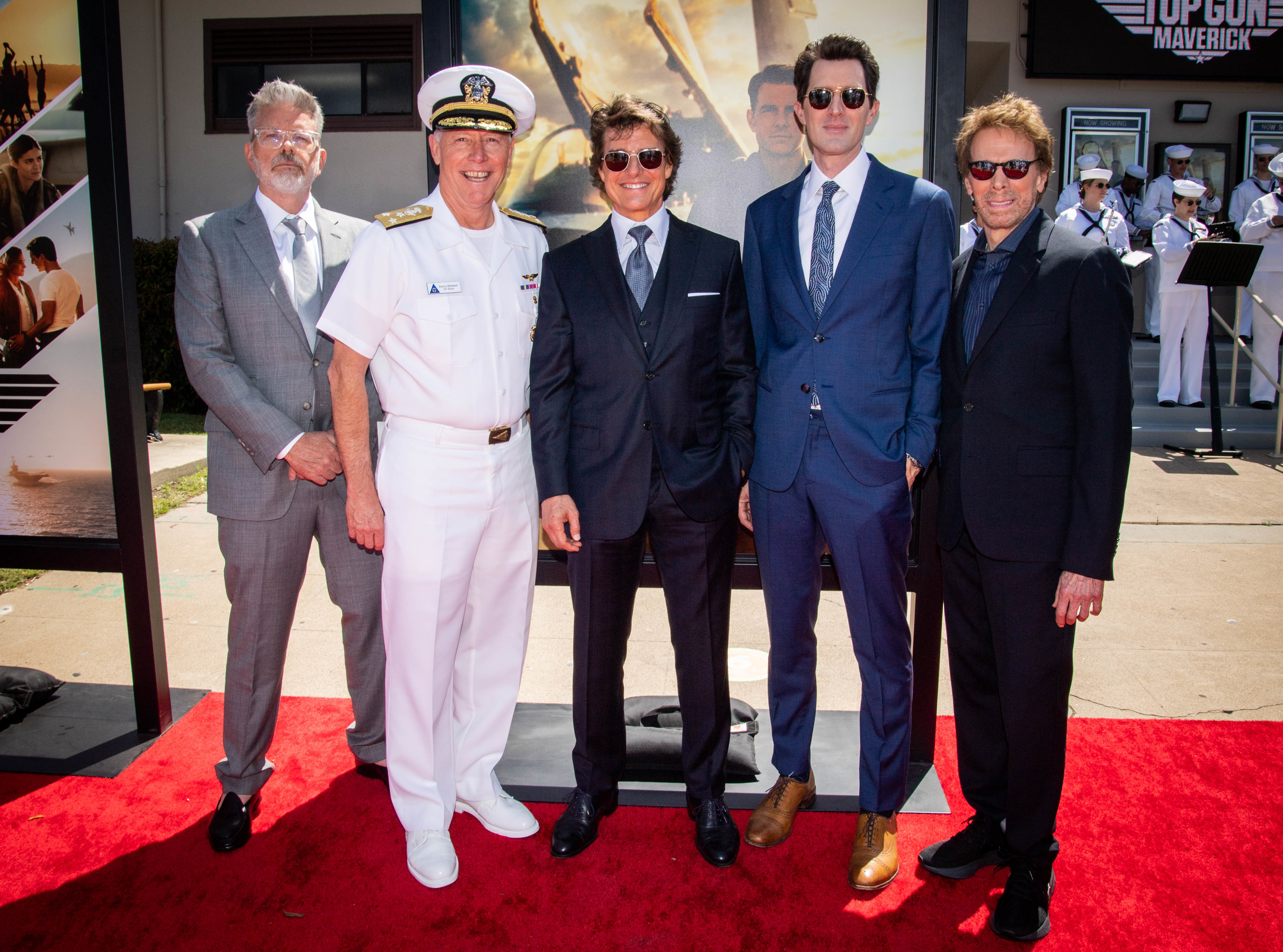
(From left) Christopher McQuarrie, Vice Admiral Kenneth R. Whitesell, Tom Cruise, Joseph Kosinski, and Jerry Bruckheimer at the premiere of the film on May 4, 2022

=== Theatrical ===
Top Gun: Maverick was generally released theatrically by Paramount Pictures in the United States on May 27, 2022 - after a TopGun Tuesday premier at select ScreenX theaters and AMC Theatres at limited locations across the United States on May 24, 2022, and advance screenings starting May 26. It was originally scheduled to be released on July 12, 2019, but was delayed to June 26, 2020, in order to shoot several complex action sequences. By March 2020, Paramount moved the film up two days early on June 24, 2020, and it was then moved to December 23 due to the ongoing COVID-19 pandemic declared by the World Health Organization. On July 23, 2020, the film was delayed again to July 2, 2021, partly due to scheduling conflicts with Cruise, as well as the recent delays of Mulan and Tenet due to the rise of COVID-19 cases, and was further delayed to November 19, 2021, before being pushed back further to a May 2022 release date.

The film had its world premiere at CinemaCon on April 28, 2022 which was followed by a global premiere hosted at the San Diego Civic Theatre in San Diego, on May 4, which was also streamed live through YouTube. It also screened at the 2022 Cannes Film Festival on May 18 in an Official Selection Screening, where it received a five-minute standing ovation from the audience. The Cannes premiere included a tribute to Cruise and his career. The following day it had its UK premiere at the Royal Film Performance at London's Odeon Luxe Leicester Square in aid of the Film & TV Charity. The film was the last Royal Film Performance of Queen Elizabeth II's reign as she died later that same year.

=== Home media ===
Apple TV+ attempted to purchase the distribution rights to Top Gun: Maverick, but Paramount declined to sell them. When asked at the film's CinemaCon premiere about Apple and other streaming companies attempting to purchase the distribution rights, Bruckheimer said that the film had always had a big-screen destination. At the film's premiere at Cannes, Cruise also denied that the film was going to streaming. Despite the model that most films at the time debuted on streaming 45 days after their theatrical releases, Paramount decided to keep Top Gun: Maverick in theaters for an extended run due to Cruise's insistence and the successive week-to-week box office results of the film. The film was released digitally in standard definition, high definition and UHD on August 23, 2022, followed by the Ultra HD Blu-ray, Blu-ray, and DVD releases on November 1, 2022, in the United States and October 31, 2022, in the United Kingdom. It includes the expanded aspect ratio of 1.90:1 in select sequences as seen in IMAX screenings, four featurettes on the making of the film, Cruise discussing his career at the 75th Cannes Film Festival and two music videos of the songs featured in the film.

Paramount+ and SkyShowtime (under the joint venture between both Paramount Global and Sky Group) made Top Gun: Maverick available to stream on December 22, 2022, as part of a customer's subscription to either service. In the United States, Top Gun: Maverick became the most-watched film to debut on Paramount+.

== Reception ==
=== Box office ===
Top Gun: Maverick grossed $722 million in the United States and Canada, and $781 million in other territories, for a worldwide total of $1.503 billion. The film became the highest-grossing film of Cruise's career on June 17, 2022, after crossing $800 million worldwide. On June 26, the film crossed $1 billion, becoming the second film to do so during the pandemic era. It is the second-highest-grossing film released in 2022 (behind Avatar: The Way of Water). Sonny Bunch, writing for The Washington Post, argued that the film's financial success along with that of Spider-Man: No Way Home (2021) demonstrates that securing a theatrical release in China is not mandatory for a Hollywood film to be profitable. Deadline Hollywood calculated the film's net profit as $391.1 million, accounting for production budgets, marketing, talent participations, and other costs; box office grosses and home media revenues placed it second on their list of 2022's "Most Valuable Blockbusters".

In the United States and Canada, Top Gun: Maverick was the highest-grossing film released in 2022. It grossed $126.7 million in its opening three-day weekend and $160.5 million over the four-day Memorial Day weekend, finishing first at the box office and nearly doubling Cruise's previous career best. The film also had the largest Memorial Day four-day opening weekend. Its Memorial Day weekend record was later broken in 2025 by Lilo & Stitch ($183 million). In its second weekend, it grossed $90 million; the 29% drop was the smallest ever for a film that had an opening of over $100 million, surpassing Shrek 2 (33% drop in its second weekend from a $108 million debut in May 2004). The film was dethroned by newcomer Jurassic World Dominion in its third weekend, but still grossed $51.9 million. The film remained in the top five at the box office throughout its first ten weeks of release. The film finally dropped out of the top five at the box office in its 11th weekend, finishing sixth with $7 million. In its 12th weekend, the film was re-released in over 400 theaters and made $7.1 million, returning to second place. In its 15th weekend, the film made $6 million (and a total of $7.9 million over the four-day Labor Day frame), returning to the top of the box office. Box office analysts attributed the film's longevity at the box office to positive critical reviews and word of mouth.

Outside the US and Canada, the film grossed $124 million from 62 markets in its opening weekend. It was Cruise's biggest opening ever in 32 of those markets and Paramount's best opening for a live-action film in 18 of them. The largest markets in its opening weekend were the United Kingdom ($19.4 million), France ($11.7 million), Australia ($10.7 million), Japan ($9.7 million), and Germany ($6.5 million). The film had the best debut of Cruise's career in the Middle East ($6.3 million), Brazil ($5.3 million), the Netherlands ($2.4 million), Sweden ($2.2 million), Belgium ($1.7 million), New Zealand ($1.4 million), Poland ($1.2 million), Argentina ($1.2 million), Finland ($1.1 million) and Portugal ($770,000). IMAX accounted for $10.4 million of its opening weekend outside the US and Canada. The following weekend, it made $85.8 million, a mere 16% drop that included $18.5 million from IMAX screenings. As of May 1, 2024, the top markets are the United Kingdom ($103.4 million), Japan ($101.7 million), South Korea ($67.2 million), Australia ($64.3 million) and France ($59.8 million).

=== Critical response ===
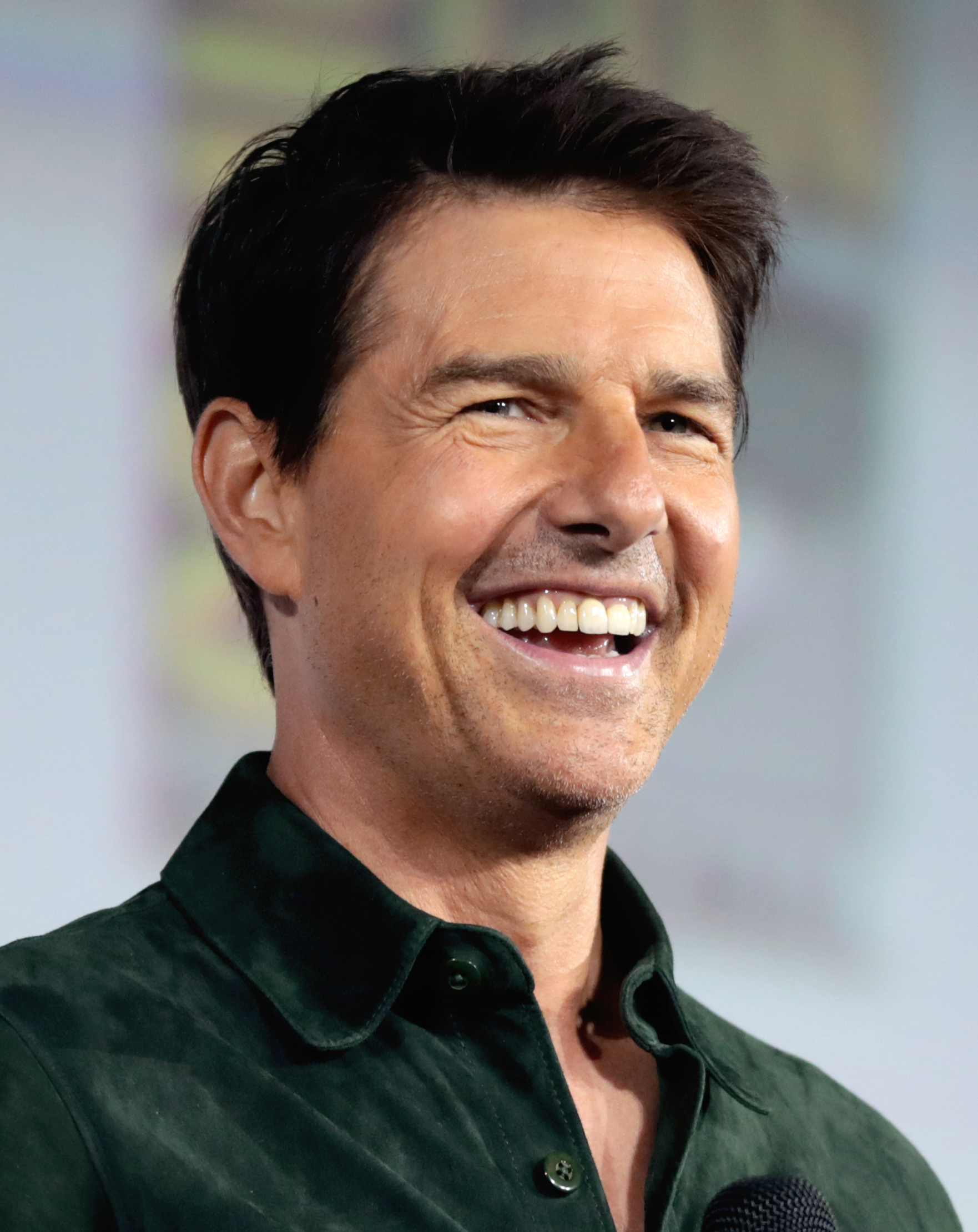
Many critics found the film better than its predecessor and described it as one of the best Tom Cruise films of all time.

On the review aggregator website Rotten Tomatoes, 96% of 476 critics' reviews are positive, with an average rating of 8.2/10. The website's consensus reads: "Top Gun: Maverick pulls off a feat even trickier than a 4G inverted dive, delivering a long-belated sequel that surpasses its predecessor in wildly entertaining style." Metacritic, which uses a weighted average, assigned the film a score of 78 out of 100, based on 63 critics, indicating "generally favorable" reviews. Audiences polled by CinemaScore gave the film a rare "A+" grade on an A+ to F scale, while PostTrak reported 96% of audience members gave it a positive score, with 84% saying they would definitely recommend it.

Pete Hammond of Deadline Hollywood thought Maverick was better than the first film. The New York Times-based critic A. O. Scott called it a "thin, over-strenuous and sometimes very enjoyable movie" and "an earnest statement of the thesis that movies can and should be great." Peter Bradshaw wrote in The Guardian that "Cruise presides over some surprising differences from his first outing as the navy pilot hotshot in a film that's missing the homoerotic tensions of the 80s original." Alonso Duralde of TheWrap opined that the film "counts as a worthy sequel in that it succeeds and fails in many of the same ways as the original." Mark Kermode, writing in The Guardian, saw the film as an "eye-popping blockbuster" which "manages to take your breath away".

Entertainment.ie's Brian Lloyd's 4-star review said the film "exceeds with flying colours" and "exists in a world that is all of its own making. There are golden sunsets, perfectly crisp white t-shirts, exquisitely coiffed hair, and long-held flames of romance that make it all impossible to resist." Clarrise Loughery, chief editor of The Independent, wrote that the film is "as thrilling as blockbusters get. It's the kind of edge-of-your-seat, fist-pumping spectacular that can unite an entire room full of strangers sitting in the dark and leave them with a wistful tear in their eye." Richard Brody of The New Yorker characterized it as more of a reimagining than a direct sequel, integrating contemporary political themes into the aerial combat drama of the 1986 film. Tomris Laffly of RogerEbert.com highlighted its emotional depth, emphasizing its unexpectedly powerful impact on audiences.

In June 2025, IndieWire ranked the film at number 7 on its list of "The 100 Best Movies of the 2020s (So Far)."

==== Industry response ====
On August 3, 2022, filmmaker Quentin Tarantino called Top Gun: Maverick "fantastic", as the film, alongside Steven Spielberg's West Side Story (2021), "provided a true cinematic spectacle, the kind that I'd almost thought that I wasn't going to see anymore." As a long-time admirer of the original Top Gun director, the late Tony Scott, he added: "There was just this lovely, lovely aspect because I love both Tony Scott's cinema so much, and I love Tony so much that that's as close as we're ever going to get to seeing one more Tony Scott movie ... The respect and the love of Tony was in every frame. It was almost in every decision. It was consciously right there, but in this really cool way that was really respectful." Spielberg himself also praised the film as having "saved the entire theatrical industry".

Ridley Scott, Tony's older brother with whom Cruise worked on the 1985 film Legend, was given a private screening for Maverick. Bruckheimer stated, "One of the most heartwarming things I experienced is when we showed the movie to Tony's brother, Ridley. He was laudatory in his praise for the film and the kind of care that Tom took to honor Tony throughout the movie. That was foremost in everybody's mind." However, Fede Álvarez, director of the 2024 film Alien: Romulus (produced by Ridley), later stated that Ridley had more negative feelings on Maverick. Álvarez stated "I asked him about the new Top Gun and he's like 'meh.' I'm like, 'What are you talking about?' And he was like, 'My brother's was original and this is like eh.' He really respected it, but you could see how tough he was." The film was dedicated to Tony Scott's memory.

=== Role of the U.S. military ===
The film was actively supported and influenced by the United States Department of Defense and the United States Navy to present the U.S. military in a positive light and aid in recruitment and retention. The U.S. Air Force also ran recruitment ads before the film's screenings. This led some to criticize the film as propaganda.

=== Accolades ===
At the 95th Academy Awards, Top Gun: Maverick received nominations for Best Picture, Best Adapted Screenplay, Best Original Song, Best Film Editing, and Best Visual Effects; and won Best Sound. The film's other nominations include four British Academy Film Awards, six Critics' Choice Movie Awards (winning one), and two Golden Globe Awards. It received two National Board of Review Awards and was named one of the top-ten films of 2022 by the American Film Institute.

== Lawsuits ==
=== 2022 Yonay family lawsuit ===
In June 2022, the family of Israeli author Ehud Yonay, whose May 1983 California magazine article "Top Guns" inspired the original film, filed a lawsuit against Paramount. They accused the studio of copyright infringement related to the release of Top Gun: Maverick and sought both damages and an injunction to halt the film's distribution. Jerry Bruckheimer produced the original film, whose screenplay was written by Jim Cash (died 2000) and Jack Epps Jr.; all three men participated in the sequel. According to the lawsuit, Paramount had obtained exclusive film rights to Yonay's article but ignored the 35-year copyright law, wherein the rights reverted to Yonay's widow Shosh and son Yuval in January 2020 after the writer's death in 2012.

The lawsuit claimed that Maverick contains elements similar to the original article and that Paramount continued with the filming, even after receiving notice of the copyright's termination. The film distributor considered most of the sequel to have been complete before then and denied that Maverick was derived from Yonay's article. A court dismissed the suit in April 2024, noting that Top Gun: Maverick and the magazine article were not similar beyond their treatment of unprotectable historical facts. The U.S. Court of Appeals for the Ninth Circuit affirmed the lower court's summary judgment and ruled that the Maverick did not infringe the original article.

=== 2025 Shaun Gray lawsuit ===
In April 2025, Shaun Gray, cousin of Maverick co-screenwriter Eric Singer, brought a lawsuit asserting joint authorship of the film. Gray claimed that he had written key scenes and "actively participated in story meetings with Singer and the film's director, Joseph Kosinski," but was not under a traditional work for hire contract with Paramount and so retained copyright to his contributions. In July, Judge Jed S. Rakoff dismissed Gray's joint authorship claim but allowed his alternative claim of copyright infringement to continue. In August, Paramount Global brought counterclaims of infringement as well as fraud, alleging that Gray had "effectively admitted to infringing" the company's copyright in its pre-existing Top Gun material, as he had not been under a contract with Paramount when he contributed scenes to the film and therefore had produced an unauthorized derivative work. On January 9, 2026, Judge Rakoff dismissed Gray's copyright claim against Paramount while allowing Paramount's counterclaims to proceed to trial.

== Sequel ==
In May 2022, Teller revealed that he had been pitching a sequel, which would be tentatively titled Top Gun: Rooster and centered on his character, to Paramount Pictures. By July of the same year, he stated that he has been having ongoing discussions with Cruise regarding a sequel. In January 2024, it was reported that a sequel was in development. In May 2025, Christopher McQuarrie confirmed he was writing Top Gun 3. In April 2026, it was announced that the third film was officially in the works.

== See also ==
- Chinese censorship abroad
- List of film sequels by box-office performance
- List of media set in San Diego
- Military–entertainment complex – Cooperation between the military and entertainment industries
