= Stephanie Phillips =

American comics writer

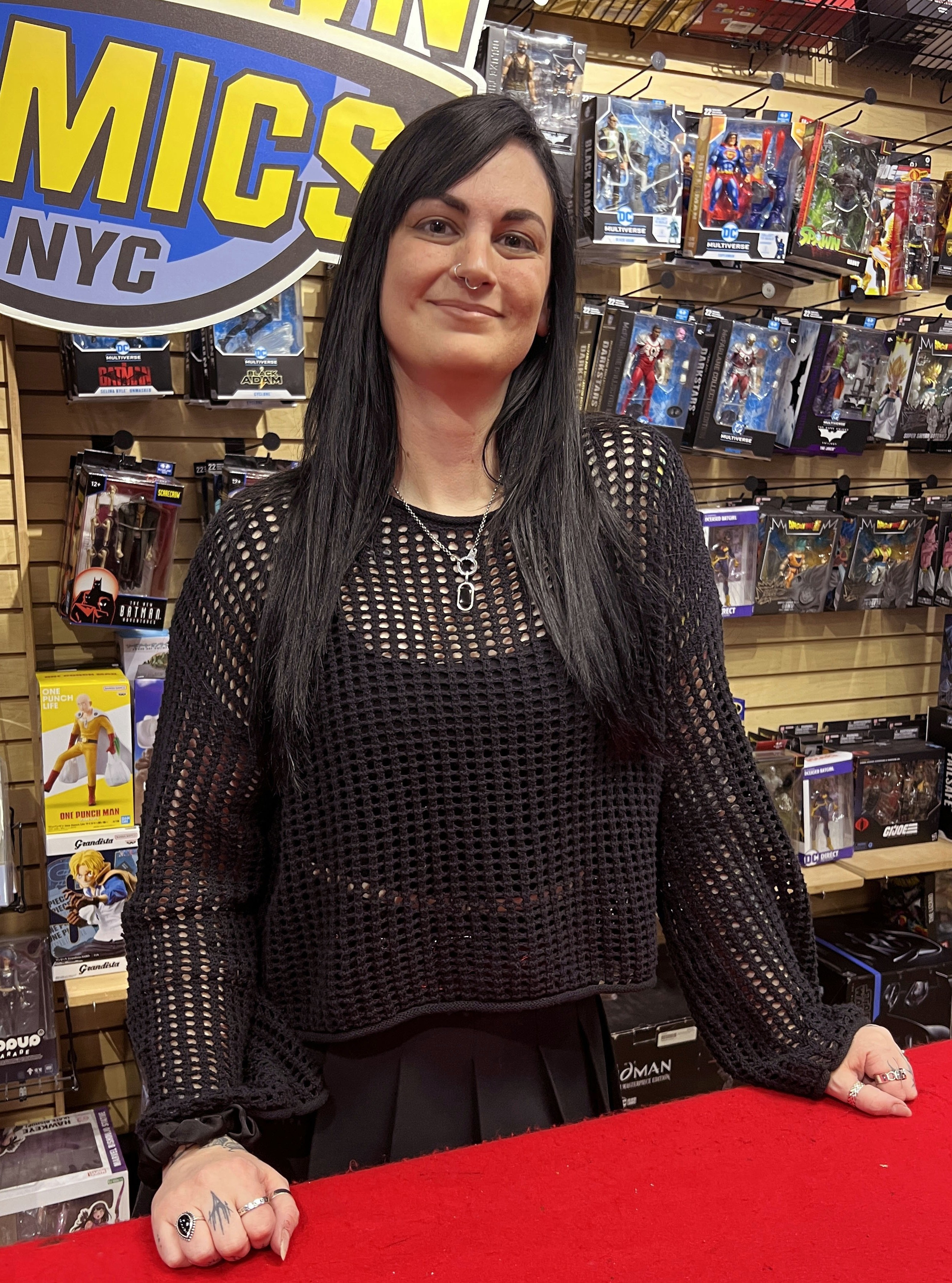
- Phillips at a signing for Daredevil at Midtown Comics in Manhattan, 2026
- Area: Writer
- Notable works: Harley Quinn, Sensational Wonder Woman, Grim, Spider-Gwen: Ghost Spider, Phoenix

Stephanie Phillips is an American comics writer known for her work on various series for DC Comics and Marvel Comics, including Harley Quinn, Wonder Woman, Spider-Gwen, and Phoenix, as well as her creator-owned series, Grim, which was published by Boom! Studios.

== Early life ==
Stephanie Phillips grew up in Tampa, Florida. She attended the University of South Florida, where she earned an MA in English and a PhD in rhetoric and composition.

== Career ==
Phillips taught writing and communication at the University at Buffalo, the University of South Florida, and the University of Tampa. She worked as a technical writer, an editor, and a journalist, as well as a competitive Muay Thai fighter.

In 2018, Phillips published The Devil Within through Black Mask Studios with artist Maan House, a book about a demonic possession in the Philippines that was based on a true story. Later that year, she and artist Jamie Jones published Kicking Ice through Ominous Press in partnership with the National Women's Hockey League, a book about a group of female hockey players, which involved real hockey players like Kelsey Koelzer and Jillian Dempsey.

In 2019, she published Descendent through AfterShock Comics and The Butcher of Paris, based on the true story of Marcel Petiot, a serial killer who targeted Jews in Nazi-occupied France, through Dark Horse Comics. In 2020, she published two books through AfterShock, Cold War thriller Red Atlantis and time-traveling sci-fi Artemis and the Assassin, the pirate comic (starring Anne Bony and Mary Read) A Man Among Ye from Top Cow, and Taarna: The Last Taarakian for Heavy Metal. It was also announced that she would write Nuclear Family, about an alternate timeline where the Cold War became hot, from AfterShock.

In 2021, it was announced that she would write the two issue Future State: Harley Quinn and the new Harley Quinn ongoing series relaunched as part DC's relaunch of its comics line, Infinite Frontier, with artist Riley Rossmo. She also wrote the digital-first comic Sensational Wonder Woman and the eight-issue miniseries Wonder Woman: Evolution. In November 2021, it was announced that she would publish We Only Kill Each Other, about Jewish gangsters fighting Nazis in 1930s New York, through ComiXology Originals.

In 2022, she launched Grim, a monthly creator-owned series at Boom! Studios about a grim reaper navigating the afterlife, and Rick and Morty: Crisis on C-137 through Oni Press. In October 2022, it was announced at the San Diego Comic-Con "Women of Marvel" panel that she would write a new Rogue & Gambit miniseries as part of the Destiny of X relaunch of the X-Men line of books, and in November, it was announced that she would write a new Cosmic Ghost Rider miniseries for that same publisher.

In 2023, she was reporter to be the writer for Capwolf and the Howling Commandos, and in 2024, she became the writer for a Black Widow & Hawkeye miniseries and a new Spider-Gwen: Ghost Spider ongoing series. In April, it was announced that she would be a part of the X-Men: From the Ashes relaunch, writing the monthly series Phoenix.

In August of that year, she wrote Red Before Black, which was published by Boom! Studios, and listed as one of nine independent comics for 2024.

In November 2025, it was announced that Philips would write a new Daredevil series with artist Lee Garbett. The series follows Matt Murdock as he becomes a law professor at Empire State University while facing a new enemy named Omen, whom Phillips explained is derived from elements of Greek tragedy and Gothic literature. The series debuted on April 1, 2026 to positive reviews.

Phllips attracted a base of followers on TikTok, where she discusses her writing process, participates in Q&A sessions, relates behind-the-scenes anecdotes, provides insight and advice for aspiring writers, and delves into comics culture and criticism.

== Personal life ==
Phillips is bisexual.

== Bibliography ==
=== Marvel Comics ===
- Alien: Black, White & Blood #1, short story "The Hunt" (2024)
- Black Widow & Hawkeye #1-4 (2024)
- Capwolf and the Howling Commandos #1-4 (2023–2024)
- Contest of Chaos:
  - Spider-Man Annual vol. 4 #1 (2023)
  - Iron Man Annual vol. 4 #1 (2023)
  - Fantastic Four Annual vol. 3 #1 (2023)
  - Moon Knight Annual vol. 4 #1 (2023)
  - Spider-Gwen Annual vol. 2 #1 (2023)
  - Venom Annual vol. 3 #1 (2023)
  - X-Men Annual vol. 5 #1 (2023)
  - Avengers Annual vol. 5 #1 (2023)
- Cosmic Ghost Rider vol. 2 #1-5 (2023)
- Daredevil vol. 9 #1-present (2026-present)
- Gold ‘76 #1 (2026)
- Imperial War: Planet She-Hulk #1 (2025)
- Love Unlimited Infinity Comic #13-18 (2022)
- Marvel Zombies: Black, White & Blood #4, short story "Last Man Standing" (2024)
- Spider-Gwen:
  - Web of Spider-Man vol. 3 #1, short story "Spider-Gwen: The Ghost Spider" (2024)
  - Spider-Gwen: The Ghost Spider #1-present (2024–present)
- Star Wars: Return of the Jedi - Lando #1 (2023)
- What If...? Dark: Venom #1 (2023)
- X-Men:
  - Rogue & Gambit vol. 2 #1-5 (2023)
  - Phoenix #1-15 (2024–2025)
  - X-Men: Blood Hunt - Laura Kinney the Wolverine #1 (2024)

=== DC Comics ===
- Aquaman 80th Anniversary 100-Page Super Spectacular #1, short story "Multitudes" (2021)
- Batman:
  - Legends of the Dark Knight vol. 2 #4 (2021)
  - Batman: Urban Legends #1, short story "New Roots" (2021)
  - Detective Comics #1044-1046, backup stories (2021)
  - Legends of the Dark Knight vol. 2 #4 (2021)
  - Shadow War Zone #1, short story "Ninjas! at the Arcade" (2022)
- Dark Crisis: Worlds Without a Justice League - Green Arrow #1 (2022)
- DC Cybernetic Summer #1, short story "Summer Camp" (2020)
- DC Pride 2022 #1, short story "Bat's in the Cradle" (2022)
- DC's Crimes of Passion #1, short story "Pulling Punches" (2020)
- Gotham City Villains Anniversary Giant #1, short story "For the Sky is Red" (2021)
- Green Arrow 80th Anniversary 100-Page Super Spectacular #1, short story "Who Watches the Watchtower" (2021)
- Harley Quinn:
  - Future State: Harley Quinn #1-2 (2021)
  - Harley Quinn vol. 4 #1-27, Annual 2021, Annual 2022 (2021–2023)
  - Harley Quinn 30th Anniversary Special #1, short story "How to Train Your Hyena" (2022)
- Infinite Frontier Secret Files #1, short stories "Seeing Red" and "Truly Two" (2021)
- Justice League: Road to Dark Crisis #1, short story "Because the Night" (2022)
- Strange Love Adventures #1, short story "Lightning in a Bottle" (2022)
- Superman Red and Blue #2, short story "My Best Friend, Superman" (2021)
- Superman: Man of Tomorrow #17 (2020)
- Wonder Woman:
  - Sensational Wonder Woman #1 (2021)
  - Sensational Wonder Woman Special #1, short story "Swapped" (2022)
  - Wonder Woman 80th Anniversary 100-Page Super Spectacular #1, short story "Immortal Mysteries" (2021)
  - Wonder Woman: Evolution #1-8 (2021–2022)

=== Other comics ===
==== AfterShock Comics ====
- Artemis and the Assassin #1-5 (2020)
- Descendent #1-5 (2019)
- Nuclear Family #1-5 (2021)
- Red Atlantis #1-5 (2020–2021)

==== A Wave Blue World ====
- Averee #1-5 (2021)
- Maybe Someday: Stories of Promise, Visions of Hope, short story "The Garden" (2020)

==== Black Mask Studios ====
- Devil Within #1-4 (2018)

==== Boom! Studios ====
- Grim #1-20 (2022–2024)
- Red Before Black #1-6 (2024–2025)

==== ComiXology Originals ====
- Black Sight #1-5 (2023–2024)
- Mark Dawson's Beatrix Rose: Vigilante #1-5 (2022)
- We Only Kill Each Other #1-5 (2021–2022)

==== Dark Horse Comics ====
- The Butcher of Paris #1-5 (2019–2020)

==== DSTLRY ====
- Life #1-present, co-written with Brian Azzarello (2024–present)

==== Heavy Metal ====
- Heavy Metal Magazine #296, short story "The Language of Revolution" (2019)
- Taarna: The Last Taarakian #1-5 (2020)

==== Humanoids ====
- Eight Limbs (2023) (Life Drawn)

==== Mad Cave Studios ====
- Grimm Tales from the Cave (2021)

==== Oni Press ====
- Cruel Universe #2, short story "Organ1c" (2024) (EC Comics)
- Epitaphs from the Abyss #1, short story "Family Values" (2024) (EC Comics)
- Rick and Morty: Crisis on C-137 #1-4 (2022)

==== Image Comics ====
- A Man Among Ye #1-8 (2020–2022) (Top Cow)
- Postal: Night Shift (2020) (Top Cow)
- The Silver Coin #12 (2022)

==== Other ====
- GodSlap #1-5 (2022–2024) (Meatier Productions)
- Kicking Ice (2018) (Ominous Press)
- Octobriana With Love (2021) (Dead Good Comics)
