= Grim (comic book) =

American comic book series

- Cover to Grim #4

Publication information
- Publisher: Boom! Studios
- Format: Ongoing series
- Genre: Supernatural; Action
- Publication date: May 11, 2022
- No. of issues: 21
- Main character: Jessica Harrow

Creative team
- Written by: Stephanie Phillips
- Artist: Flaviano
- Letterer: Tom Napolitano
- Colorist: Rico Renzi
- Editor: Eric Harburn

Collected editions
- Vol 1: Don't Fear the Reaper: ISBN 978-1684158829
- Vol 2: Devils and Dust: ISBN 978-1684159055
- Vol 3: Lust for Life: ISBN 978-1608861460
- Vol 4: Eve of Destruction: ISBN 978-1608868865
- Book 1. Deluxe Edition: ISBN 978-1608862306

Grim is a monthly, creator-owned comic book series created by writer Stephanie Philips and artist Flaviano, published monthly by Boom! Studios with the first issue releasing on May 11, 2022. It is a dark supernatural comic book series that delves into the complexities of life, death, and the afterlife—Told through the eyes of Jessica Harrow, a Grim Reaper with no recollection of her past or how she became one, whose journey leads her to uncover unsettling truths about her existence.

== Plot ==
Jessica Harrow is a Reaper, tasked with ferrying souls to the afterlife. Unlike her peers, she has no memory of her death or how she became a Reaper. Her life drastically changes when a soul named Bryan Andrews whom she ferried to the afterlife manages to steals her scythe, allowing him to return to earth. Jessica chases him down and confronts him revealing that she has the unique ability to shift between the world of the living and the dead, allowing her to be seen by and interact with the living. This anomaly leads Jessica to question her existence and seek answers about her past from Adria—the current leader of the Reapers.

Jessica's quest for the truth leads her to Death's (The Grim Reaper) scythe. The Grim Reaper had abandoned the afterlife for a long time leaving behind his scythe which no other reaper has been able to use. The scythe is activated by Jessica and takes her to Las Vegas, where she encounters Death himself, who reveals that he is her father and that she never died. He explains that Adira is his sister and has taken over the afterlife in his absence. Adira reveals Jessica's location to "The End"—an ancient force representing the ultimate cessation of existence, who is hunting down Jessica to kill her and restore the imbalance caused by her shifting between realms. The End finds and attacks Jessica, but her father—Death frights him off to protect her, opening a portal and sending himself and The End to hell. With Death's fate unknown, and The End gone, the natural order is disrupted—people can no longer die, leading to chaos and suffering. The Fates—three clairvoyant entities who oversee the balance of life and death inform Jessica that she is now the Grim Reaper replacing death and must restore balance to the world by retrieving the End from Hell.

Jessica, along with her fellow Reapers and close friends Eddie and Marcel, navigates various gateways to Hell, each character confronts their personal demons: Eddie faces the consequences of his past actions, Marcel grapples with guilt over a betrayal in 1898 Paris, where he sacrificed his lover, Henri, for literary success—this guilt manifests in his personal Hell, forcing him to confront his actions, and Jessica seeks clarity about her origins and destiny. Their path is fraught with challenges, including navigating treacherous landscapes and confronting entities that test their resolve. Jessica's mother, Lilah who is revealed to have been in jail, is introduced as a formidable figure—resisting manipulation by "Life"—the literal personification of the word and long time adversary of Death, who seeks a powerful amulet she possesses that was given to her by her former lover and Jessica's father—Death. Despite Life's attempts, she rejects his offers, showcasing her resilience. Jessica, grappling with self-doubt, is encouraged by Annabel, a fellow Reaper and friend of the trio, to embrace her destiny as the new Grim Reaper and confront Adira, as she leads them to a hidden gateway to the afterlife only to reveal a sinister deal between Annabel and Adira to deliver Jessica and her friends in exchange for freeing a dangerous soul from hell, a soul that threatens the end of all existence.

== Characters ==
- Jessica Harrow: serves as the central figure in the narrative. She is a Reaper assigned to escort souls to the afterlife. Unlike her counterparts, Jessica lacks any recollection of her own death, prompting her to investigate the circumstances surrounding it. Her unique heritage, being the daughter of Death and a human named Lilah, grants her the rare ability to interact with the living world. This distinct capability sets her apart within the Reaper hierarchy. She later becomes the Grim Reaper after death goes missing, and is charged with restoring balance to the world.
- Eddie: a fellow Reaper and close associate of Jessica. In his mortal life, he was a musician active during the 1970s and 1980s. Eddie faced familial challenges, particularly with a father who disapproved of his musical pursuits and personal style. Despite these obstacles, he achieved fame in the music industry. However, his career was marked by personal struggles, including substance use and strained relationships, notably with his drummer and childhood friend, Saul. These issues culminated in a decline that led to his death and subsequent role as a Reaper.
- Marcel Beaufoy: He is a Reaper and friend of Jessica who collaborates with her and Eddie in their duties of guiding souls to the afterlife. Originating from 19th-century France, Marcel's background includes aspirations of becoming a successful writer. His past is marked by a significant event involving his lover, Henri, whose death is explored in issue #13. In this issue, Marcel confronts memories of his relationship with Henri and the choices that led to Henri's demise.
- Adira: She is the sister of Death and a demon who was worshipped in ancient Mesopotamia around 500 B.C. In Death's absence, Adira assumes control over the afterlife, directing the activities of the Reapers. She has a history of attempting to overthrow the afterlife's order, leading to her punishment by Death, who removed her powers and clipped her wings. Adira's tenure as the custodian of the afterlife is marked by her authoritative rule and complex interactions with other characters, including her niece, Jessica Harrow.
- Death: the personification of mortality and one of the Four Horsemen of the Apocalypse, he is Jessica's father and former lover of Lilah Harrow. Death is the original leader of the afterlife and its workings who leaves to spend time in the world of the living. His absence creates a power vacuum in the afterlife, leading to various challenges and conflicts among the Reapers and other entities. After a battle for Jessica's life with one of the said entities known as "The End", Death's fate becomes unknown and he is lost, resulting in a situation whereby all living things are no longer able to die.
- Lilah Harrow: She is the mother of Jessica Harrow and was formerly in a relationship with Death. Lilah spent decades in prison, during which she received a letter from Death indicating that Jessica would need her. Following a prison riot, she escaped, leaving the facility in flames. Lilah possesses a red and black amulet given to her by Death that holds significant power. The entity known as Life sought this amulet and attempted to persuade Lilah to relinquish it by offering money, which she refused. Eventually, Life took the amulet from her.
- Annabel: Initially serving as a records keeper in the afterlife, she later becomes involved in significant events affecting the realms of life, death, and the afterlife. Annabel makes a deal that merges these three planes, leading to widespread consequences. She collaborates with Adira, delivering Jessica and Eddie and sending Marcel to Hell in exchange for a soul of her choosing. Subsequently, Annabel becomes host to a parasitic entity, further influencing her actions and the unfolding events.

== Development and publication history ==
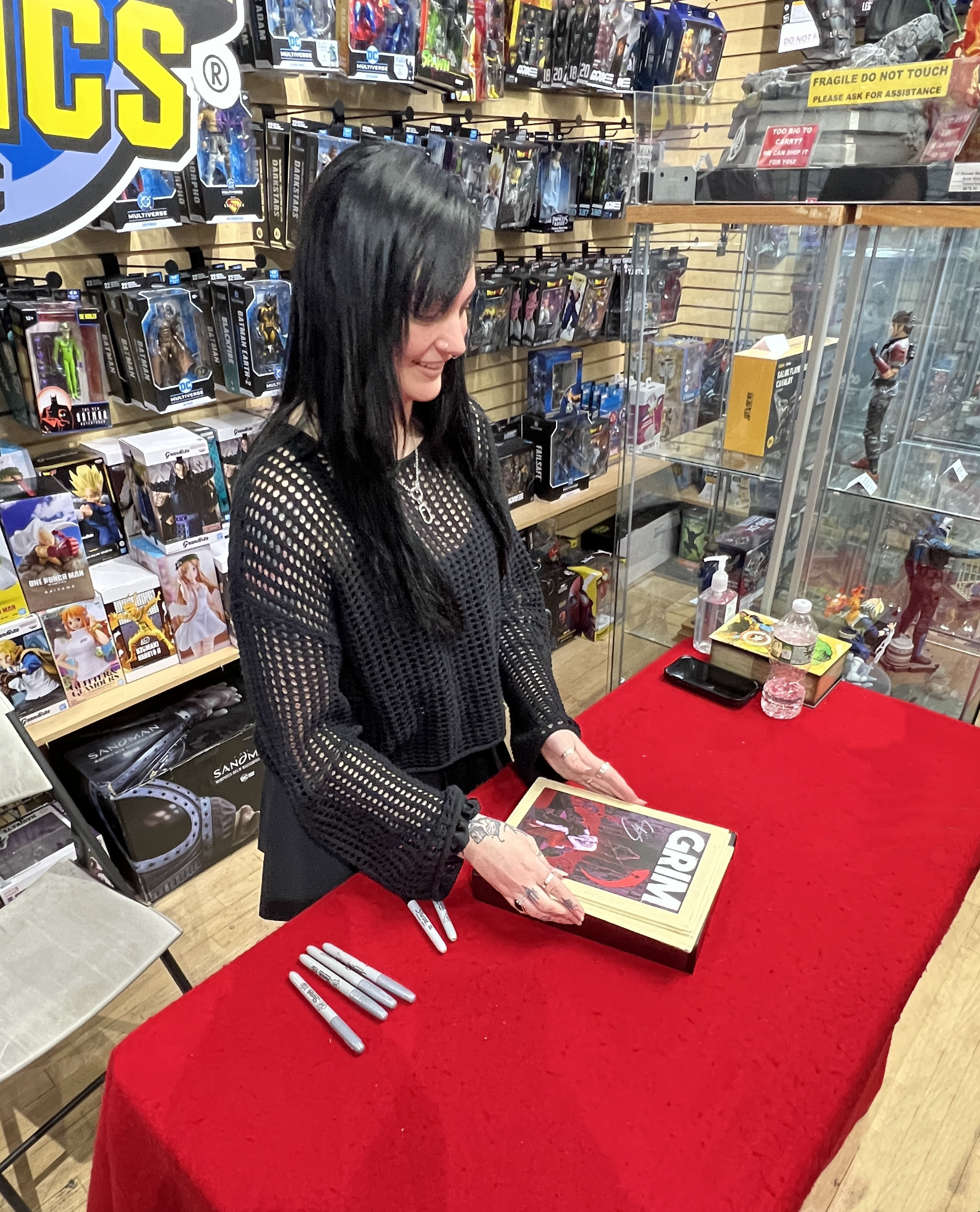
Writer Stephanie Phillips signing a copy of the series during an appearance at Midtown Comics in Manhattan

In February 2022, BOOM! Studios officially unveiled Grim – an original horror-fantasy series by writer Stephanie Phillips and artist Flaviano. The announcement described Grim as a dark, brooding mystery about Jessica Harrow, a young woman who finds herself dead and recruited as a Reaper in the afterlife. Phillips herself summarized the tone as "dark and brooding and fixated on death… and also one of the most fun series I've ever written," praising Flaviano's dynamic art and teasing that "you'll be dying to read more!". Flaviano likewise expressed enthusiasm for designing the cast of supernatural characters, saying he "can't stop drawing Jess and all the other reapers" in this "mysterious, funny, sad, weird story". The series was released under BOOM!'s new-look imprint and quickly positioned alongside high-profile titles like Something Is Killing the Children and BRZRKR.

Grim #1 shipped in May 2022, and BOOM!'s announcement noted print copies "will be available… in May 2022". The story, with its blend of mystery and the supernatural, drew immediate retailer and fan interest. Diamond's advance-reorder charts show Grim dominating preorders for late spring 2022, and the first issue sold out its initial printing. BOOM! issued multiple print runs of #1; by June a second printing was released and by mid-July a third, followed by a fourth printing in late July 2022. Grim #1 even landed in sales charts – for example, the July 2022 ICv2 chart placed Grim#3 (released in July) at #33 in North American comic book sales for that month, indicating the series' strong commercial entry. Advance-reorder tallies for summer 2022 show Grim variants repeatedly in the Top Ten, reflecting high retailer demand.

Issues followed a generally monthly schedule throughout 2022. After #1 (May 2022) came #2 in June 2022, #3 in July, #4 in August, #5 in late September, and #6 in December. In late 2022 BOOM! announced that issue #6 would launch a new story arc titled "Devils & Dust," signaling the series' ongoing nature. Issue #6 hit stores on December 14, 2022. The creative team – Phillips on scripting, Flaviano on pencils, with Rico Renzi on colors, and Tom Napolitano on lettering – continued as planned. BOOM!'s series press similarly noted that #6 (December 2022) would feature the start of this arc, along with variant covers by Justine Florentino and Toni Infante.

In 2023 Grim resumed with issue #7 in January. BOOM!'s publicity calls Grim #7 the continuation of the "Devils & Dust" arc and announced it would be on sale January 11, 2023. Subsequent issues followed in early 2023: #8 shipped on February 8, 2023, #9 on March 22, 2023, and #10 on April 26, 2023, completing the arc. By mid-2023 Phillips and BOOM! were preparing a third arc – a 2023 news release pointed to issue #11 (out July 5, 2023 ) as the start of a new chapter, in which Jessica Harrow "goes to Hell" and builds an army of her own. Issue #12 arrived on August 2, 2023, and the series continued monthly thereafter. BOOM! later confirmed that Grim is collected in trade form: Vol. 1 which came out December 14, 2022, collecting the first five issues, while Vol. 2 was released July 18, 2023, and collects issues #6–10. Vol. 3 and 4 were similarly released to gather issues #11–15 and #16–20, respectively.

Beyond the main series, Grim has seen a special spin-off edition. In late 2023 BOOM! announced Grim #1: Pen & Ink, a deluxe monochrome art edition of the first issue. This special hardcover (with commentary by artist Flaviano) was slated for February 2024. It joins BOOM!'s "Pen & Ink" line (which includes premium editions of BRZRKR and Something Is Killing the Children) and is intended as a collector's edition highlighting Flaviano's pencils with new interior pages. No other major spin-offs or crossovers have been announced to date; Grim remains a self-contained ongoing story with Jessica Harrow and the Reapers as its focus.

== Collected editions ==
Title	Material collected	Date published	ISBN
Grim Vol 1: Don't Fear the Reaper	Chapters 1–5	December 14, 2022	978-1-68415-882-9
Grim Vol 2: Devils and Dust	Chapters 6–10	July 12, 2023	978-1-68415-905-5
Grim Vol 3: Lust for Life	Chapters 11–15	Febury 21, 2024	978-1-60886-146-0
Grim Vol 4: Eve of Destruction	Chapters 16–20	November 27, 2024	978-1-60886-886-5
Grim Vol 5: Fear the reapers	Chapters 21-25	April 7, 2026	979-8-89215-356-0
Book 1. Deluxe Edition	Chapters 1–15	June 5, 2024	978-1-60886-230-6

== Reception and Sales ==
The first Volume of Grim holds a positive review of 8.8 out of 10 on the website Comic Watch, with Seth A. Romo calling it "an awesome dive into the afterworld and the Reapers who run it. It's epic, it's punk, and it should be on your reading list."

All 21 released issues of the comic book series have gotten a collective positive review from the review-aggregator website Comic Book Roundup, holding a strong average critic rating of 8.8 out of 10 for 71 reviews, and a slightly lower average user rating of 8.3 out of 10 for 64 reviews.

Critically, Grim has earned positive notices from various outlets. Reviews praised Phillips and Flaviano's creative synergy and the series' intriguing premise. For instance, Multiversity Comics' review commended #1 as a "deft beginning" to the story, and AIPT Comics highlighted the "terrific potential" of the series. Readers have also responded well: on League of Comic Geeks, Grim #1 holds a 4.4/5 average rating ("Very Positive") based on hundreds of fan reviews.

Sales data and reception have been solid for Grim. Industry tracking shows consistently high retailer interest. For example, in July 2022 Grim #3 was ranked #33 in ICv2's Top 50 monthly charts. The hardcover launch of Grim Vol. 1 (a "Discover Now" edition) was also listed among the top reorder novels in late 2022. Notably, variants of Grim #4 dominated advance-reorder charts for August 2022; BOOM! reported that Grim #4's cover F was the single most advance-reordered comic of that week, with multiple other covers of #4 in the Top 10. These metrics underscore that Grim has been one of BOOM!'s strong-selling indie series. By mid-2023 the first trade paperback had gone into multiple printings as well, and subsequent volumes have been distributed through standard book channels (Grim Vol. 2 was a new release in July 2023).

There is no record of major industry awards or Eisner nominations for Grim itself at this time (as of April 2025), but the series has become a bestseller within BOOM!'s lineup (and it has bolstered Phillips' reputation as a writer, following her previous acclaimed work on titles like Harley Quinn).

== Animated series ==
In November 2025, Netflix reported that they were working with Alfred Gough and Miles Millar to develop an animated series adaptation of the comic with Jennifer Yuh Nelson.
