= Captain America in: The Doom Tube of Dr. Megalomann =

1987 video game

- Developer: Adventure Soft
- Publisher: Go!
- Platforms: Atari ST, Amstrad CPC, Commodore 64, ZX Spectrum
- Release: 1987, 1988
- Genre: Action
- Mode: Single-player

Captain America in: The Doom Tube of Dr. Megalomann, also known as Captain America Defies The Doom Tube, is a video game based on a comic book series of the same name. It was published in 1987 by U.S. Gold on their Go! label for computers including the Amstrad CPC and the Commodore 64 and was published a year later on the ZX Spectrum. Reviews were mixed, with the graphics and audio generally seen as poor. It is the first video game to feature Captain America.

== Gameplay ==
Players take on the role of Marvel superhero Captain America and must guide him around the Doom Tube base of Dr Megalomann. The base is a long tube inside another tube, splitting areas up into chambers around a central core. The virus has been released into the base, and players can only access areas below their immunity level. By defeating enemies they can collect ying-yang which boosts their immunity. Captain America can throw his shield to take out enemies, but the number of shields he holds are limited, although he can re-use those which kill enemies or if he recalls a shield before it is lost. As the player moves Captain America around areas, they need to recover parts of a password which will allow them access into the final area to disable the missiles. The game is played in real time, giving the player only one hour in which to complete the game.

== Plot ==
Dr. Megalomann plans to launch rockets containing a deadly virus. The CIA discover his secret base below the Mojave Desert, called the Doom Tube. Captain America is sent in to stop the rockets from being launched and to save the world.

== Development and release ==
Captain America in: The Doom Tube of Dr. Megalomann was the first appearance by Captain America in a computer game. The B-side of the gaming cassette contained a mono single called Who's Crying Now by the band Resister.

== Reception ==
Reception

Review scores
Publication	Score
Crash	36%
Sinclair User	7 out of 10
Your Sinclair	7 out of 10
Zzap!64	36%

Captain America received mixed reviews. Crash criticized the lack of definition of the characters and poor audio, calling the game "a disappointing licence, wasting great potential". Your Spectrum mostly agreed with the points of Crash, but said, "the graphics aren't going to win any awards, but they're a nice size and very clear". Sinclair User described the game as addictive and praised the challenging level of gameplay. A review by Commodore 64 magazine Zzap!64 felt that the instructions lead to confusion, and that the difficult and repetitive gameplay meant that the game didn't have any lasting appeal.
