= Avengers (comics) in other media =

Marvel studios team in other media

Adaptations of the Avengers in other media
- Created by: Stan Lee; Jack Kirby
- Original source: Comics published by Marvel Comics
- First appearance: The Avengers #1 (September 1963)

Print publications
- Novel(s): List: The Avengers Battle the Earth-Wrecker (1967) The Man Who Stole Tomorrow (1979) The Avengers and the Thunderbolts (1999) X-Men and th Avengers: Gamma Quest Book 1: Lost and Found (1999) X-Men and the Avengers: Gamma Quest Book 2: Search and Rescue (1999) X-Men and the Avengers: Gamma Quest Book 2: Friend or Foe? (2000) The Ultimates: Tomorrow Men (2006) The Ultimates: Against All Enemies (2007) New Avengers: Breakout (2013) Avengers: Everybody Wants To Rule The World (2015)

Films and television
- Film(s): Ultimate Avengers (2006); Ultimate Avengers 2: Rise of the Black Panther (2006); Next Avengers: Heroes of Tomorrow (2008); The Avengers (2012); Avengers Confidential: Black Widow and Punisher (2014); Avengers: Age of Ultron (2015); Avengers: Infinity War (2018); Avengers: Endgame (2019); Avengers: Doomsday (2026); Avengers: Secret Wars (2027)
- Television show(s): The Avengers: United They Stand (1999); The Avengers: Earth's Mightiest Heroes (2010); Avengers Assemble (2013); Marvel Disk Wars: The Avengers (2014); Marvel Future Avengers (2017)

Games
- Video game(s): Captain America and the Avengers (1991); Avengers in Galactic Storm (1995); Marvel’s Avengers (2020)

The Avengers are a superhero team created by Marvel Comics that appear in comic books. Aside from comics, the Avengers appear in various forms of media such as in novels, television shows, movies, videogames and stage shows.

== Novels ==
- The Avengers Battle the Earth-Wrecker by Otto Binder was published as a mass market paperback novel by Bantam Books (F3569) in June 1967. The cover illustration depicts Captain America, Goliath; Hawkeye; Quicksilver and the Scarlet Witch (the latter pair do not actually appear).
- The team also feature in the Pocket Books line of Marvel-based paperback novels of the late 1970s. Jim Shooter's short story "This Evil Undying" (1979) - featuring the robot Ultron as the villain - appeared as part of an anthology entitled The Marvel Superheroes. The story was later adapted for the ongoing title.
- The Man Who Stole Tomorrow (1979), a full-length novel by David Michelinie, describes the Avengers' battle with Kang the Conqueror in the 40th century.
- The Berkeley Boulevard imprint published several Avengers tie-ins, each a team-up with other superhero teams: with the X-Men against the Leader in Greg Cox's Gamma Quest trilogy (1999–2000) and with the Thunderbolts against Baron Zemo in Pierce Askegren's The Avengers and the Thunderbolts (1999).
- Pocket Books published two tie-ins with the alternate universe team the Ultimates: Michael Jan Friedman's Tomorrow Men (2006) and Alex Irvine's Against All Enemies (2007).
- The Avengers appear in The Avengers (2012) tie-in novel New Avengers: Break-Out, consisting of Captain America, Iron Man, Spider-Man, Luke Cage, Spider-Woman, Hawkeye, and Black Widow.
- The Marvel Cinematic Universe incarnation of the Avengers appear in the Avengers: Age of Ultron tie-in novel Avengers: Everybody Wants To Rule The World, consisting of Iron Man, Captain America, Hulk, Thor, Black Widow, Hawkeye, Quicksilver, Scarlet Witch, and Vision.
- The Avengers appear in Stuart Moore's Thanos: Death Sentence (2017), consisting of Captain America, Iron Man, Thor, Captain Marvel, Vision, and Scarlet Witch.

== Television ==
Screen capture from The Avengers: Earth's Mightiest Heroes episode, "Breakout" (2010).

- The Avengers appear in Fantastic Four, consisting of Captain America, Hawkeye, Hercules, the Hulk, Iron Man, She-Hulk, Thor, and Vision.
- An alternate universe incarnation of the Avengers appears in the X-Men: The Animated Series episode "One Man's Worth", consisting of Captain America, Iron Man, Giant-Man, Wasp, Black Widow, Hercules, Scarlet Spider, and Daredevil.
- The Avengers appear in The Avengers: United They Stand, consisting of Ant-Man, Wasp, Wonder Man, Tigra, Hawkeye, Scarlet Witch, Falcon, Vision, Captain America, and Iron Man.
- The Avengers appear in The Avengers: Earth's Mightiest Heroes, consisting of Ant-Man, the Hulk, Iron Man, Thor, Wasp, Captain America, Black Panther, Hawkeye, Ms. Marvel, and Vision as primary members and Spider-Man as a reserve member.
- The Avengers appear in Avengers Assemble, consisting of Iron Man, Captain America, Hulk, Thor, Hawkeye, Black Widow, Falcon, and Ant-Man. In the fourth season, Black Panther, Captain Marvel, Ms. Marvel, Vision, and Wasp form the "All-New, All-Different Avengers" after the original Avengers disappear.
- The Avengers Assemble incarnation of the Avengers makes guest appearances in Ultimate Spider-Man and Guardians of the Galaxy.
- The Avengers appear in ‘’Phineas and Ferb: Mission Marvel’’, consisting of Iron Man, Thor, the Hulk, and Spider-Man.
- The Avengers appear in Marvel Disk Wars: The Avengers, consisting of Captain America, Iron Man, the Hulk, Thor, Spider-Man, Wasp, Hawkeye, Black Widow, Falcon, and Black Panther.
- The Avengers appear in Marvel Future Avengers, consisting of Iron Man, Captain America, Hulk, Thor, Wasp, Captain Marvel, Hawkeye, Black Widow, Falcon, Black Panther, Spider-Man, Iron Fist, Doctor Strange, and Ms. Marvel.
- The Avengers appear in Spidey and Iron Man: Avengers Team-Up!, a crossover special between Disney Jr.’s Spidey and His Amazing Friends (featuring Spider-Man, Ms. Marvel and Hulk) and Iron Man and His Awesome Friends (featuring Iron Man, Black Panther and Captain America).
- A preschool animated series for Disney Jr., titled Avengers: Mightiest Friends, is set for release in 2027, featuring kid versions of Iron Man, Thor, Hulk, Black Panther, Captain America, and Black Widow.

== Film ==
=== Animated ===
- The Avengers, based on the Ultimates, appear in Ultimate Avengers and Ultimate Avengers 2, consisting of Captain America, Wasp, the Hulk, Iron Man, Black Widow, Giant-Man, and Thor.
- The Avengers appear in Avengers Confidential: Black Widow & Punisher, consisting of Black Widow, Iron Man, Thor, War Machine, the Hulk, Hawkeye, and Captain Marvel.
- The Avengers appear in Marvel Super Hero Adventures: Frost Fight!, consisting of Captain America, Iron Man, Thor, the Hulk, Captain Marvel, and Reptil.

=== Live-action ===
The Avengers as seen in the 2012 Marvel Studios film, The Avengers. (L to R: Scarlett Johansson as Black Widow, Chris Hemsworth as Thor, Chris Evans as Captain America, Jeremy Renner as Hawkeye, Robert Downey Jr. as Iron Man, and Mark Ruffalo as Hulk).

The Avengers appear in films set in the Marvel Cinematic Universe, produced by Marvel Studios. The team was alluded to in Iron Man wherein the "Avengers Initiative" was mentioned. At the end of Captain Marvel, it is revealed that Nick Fury (Samuel L. Jackson) named the initiative after Carol Danvers' Air Force callsign, Avenger.

- Marvel Studios released The Avengers on May 4, 2012. Joss Whedon wrote and directed the film. Cast members include Robert Downey Jr. as Iron Man, Chris Evans as Captain America, Mark Ruffalo as the Hulk, Chris Hemsworth as Thor, Scarlett Johansson as the Black Widow, and Jeremy Renner as Hawkeye. The film depicts the origin story of the team as they unite to defeat Loki, who desires to conquer Earth with the help of an alien army known as the Chitauri.
- A sequel, Avengers: Age of Ultron, written and directed by Whedon, was released on May 1, 2015. The film features all the Avengers returning from the first film, and introduce new team members Scarlet Witch, portrayed by Elizabeth Olsen, Quicksilver, played by Aaron Taylor-Johnson, and Vision, played by Paul Bettany. The team is tasked with defeating Ultron, an artificial intelligence created by Tony Stark and Bruce Banner that rebels, aiming to destroy humanity. At the end of the film, a new roster of Avengers is established which includes Captain America, Black Widow, Scarlet Witch, Falcon (portrayed by Anthony Mackie), Vision, and War Machine (portrayed by Don Cheadle).
- The new Avengers roster appears in Captain America: Civil War, directed by Anthony and Joe Russo and released on May 6, 2016. In Civil War, the team is fractured into two opposing groups over the issue of government oversight of the team's activities; one group is led by Captain America and the other by Iron Man. Captain America's group consists of himself, Hawkeye, the Falcon, the Scarlet Witch, Ant-Man (Paul Rudd) and the Winter Soldier (Sebastian Stan), while Iron Man's group consists of himself, War Machine, Black Widow, Spider-Man (Tom Holland), Black Panther (Chadwick Boseman), and Vision.
- The Avengers, broken up in the fallout of the events of Civil War, appear again in Avengers: Infinity War, also directed by the Russo brothers and released on April 27, 2018. In this film, they join forces with the Guardians of the Galaxy, Doctor Strange (Benedict Cumberbatch), Wong (Benedict Wong), Spider-Man, the Winter Soldier, Black Panther and the army of Wakanda to stop the alien Thanos (Josh Brolin) as he attempts to claim the Infinity Stones. Their campaign fails as Thanos acquires all six Stones and initiates the Blip, killing half of all life in the universe. Almost all of the Guardians and several Avengers are killed, leaving Iron Man, Thor, Hulk, Captain America, Hawkeye, Black Widow, and War Machine as the only surviving members of the team; Nebula (Karen Gillan), and Rocket (voiced by Bradley Cooper) of the Guardians join the Avengers in the fallout. Fury also falls victim to the Blip, calls Captain Marvel (Brie Larson) for help as he disintegrates. She meets the team after she arrives on Earth looking for Fury in the mid-credits scene of Captain Marvel.
- Avengers: Endgame was released on April 26, 2019. In one month after the events of Infinity War, they discover that Thanos has destroyed the Infinity Stones to prevent anyone undoing his victory, leading Thor to decapitate him. Five years later, Ant-Man emerges from the quantum realm after being trapped there since the Snap. He joins the team with a proposition that they retrieve the Infinity Stones from the past in order to undo Thanos' actions using Lang's experience and Hank Pym's research about the quantum realm to devise a means of travelling in time. The mission is successful, though Black Widow sacrifices herself to obtain the Soul Stone. Hulk used the retrieved stones to snap again, this time with the intent of bringing everyone who was lost in the Blip back, but a past version of Thanos follows them back to the present and attacks the Avengers compound. The restored Avengers and allies appear in the final battle against Thanos, including Doctor Strange, Wong, Spider-Man, Scarlet Witch, Falcon, Winter Soldier, the Wasp (Evangeline Lilly), Star-Lord (Chris Pratt), Gamora (Zoe Saldaña), Drax the Destroyer (Dave Bautista), Groot (voiced by Vin Diesel), Mantis (Pom Klementieff), Black Panther, Shuri (Letitia Wright), M'Baku (Winston Duke), Pepper Potts (Gwyneth Paltrow), Okoye (Danai Gurira), Valkyrie (Tessa Thompson), Korg (Taika Waititi), Miek, Howard the Duck (voiced by Seth Green), and Kraglin (Sean Gunn). At the end of the battle, Iron Man sacrifices himself to defeat Thanos, Thor joins the Guardians, and Captain America passes his shield and mantle to Falcon, making him his successor after he decided to return to the 1940s to live the rest of his life with Peggy Carter.
- In Captain America: Brave New World, President Thaddeus Ross advise the ideal to Wilson about relaunching The Avengers now that the Sokovia Accords is now Repealed. At the end, Wilson tell his Falcon successor Joaquín Torres that it's now time to bring back the team.
- In Thunderbolts*, The Thunderbolts members Bucky Barnes, Yelena Belova (Florence Pugh), U. S. Agent (Wyatt Russell), Ghost (Hannah John-Kamen), Red Guardian (David Harbour) and Sentry (Lewis Pullman) were named as The New Avengers by Valentina Allegra de Fontaine (Julia Louis-Dreyfus). However, 14 months later after the team were formed, the original team was reformed by Wilson, who sued the New Avengers for copyright infringement.
- The Avengers are set to return in the upcoming films Avengers: Doomsday, to be released on December 18, 2026, and Avengers: Secret Wars, to be released on December 17, 2027.

== Video and computer games ==
The Avengers are featured in the arcade and console game Captain America and the Avengers (1991); Avengers in Galactic Storm (1995); Marvel: Ultimate Alliance (2006), its sequel Marvel: Ultimate Alliance 2 (2009), and Avengers: Battle for Earth (2012). The Marvel vs. Capcom games feature various Avengers members as playable characters. Marvel Ultimate Alliance 3: The Black Order also features the Avengers as main characters.

The team is also featured heavily in the social network game Marvel: Avengers Alliance (2012) and the mobile app game Avengers Initiative (2012).

The 2013 video game Lego Marvel Super Heroes features the Avengers as one of the main protagonists alongside the X-Men, the Fantastic Four, Spider-Man, Silver Surfer, Nick Fury, Phil Coulson and S.H.I.E.L.D. in the game's main story. The Avengers lineup in the game was closely based on the Marvel Cinematic Universe version of the team with its members being Captain America, Iron Man, Hulk, Thor, Black Widow, and Hawkeye, other Avengers members included Ant-Man, Black Panther, Falcon, Ms. Marvel, Moon Knight, She-Hulk, War Machine, Winter Soldier, and Wasp. A spin-off game titled Lego Marvel's Avengers was released in 2015 and stars the Avengers with levels based on various MCU films.

A first person Avengers action game was planned by THQ Studio Australia to coincide with the release of the first live-action movie in 2012. The game would have featured Iron Man, Captain America, the Hulk, and Thor as the main characters, with Black Widow, Hawkeye, War Machine, and Ms. Marvel appearing as unlockable characters. The story, loosely based on Secret Invasion rather than the movie, was penned by veteran comic writer Brian Michael Bendis. Though a fair amount of progress was made on the game, it was ultimately canceled after THQ Studio Australia was closed down. In late January 2017, Marvel announced a joint partnership with Square Enix for a multi-game project, starting with a game based on the Avengers, with more information to be revealed in 2018.

The Avengers, while not making an appearance are referenced in Marvel's Spider-Man, particularly Captain America and Iron Man in Otto Octavius' bio. In addition their headquarters Avengers Tower appears as a landmark.

On January 26, 2017, Marvel announced that Square Enix and Crystal Dynamics will be working on an untitled Avengers project. On June 1, 2019, through Avengers' Instagram, Facebook and Twitter accounts, Marvel announced that the game would be titled Marvel's Avengers and the game will have a worldwide reveal at Square Enix's panel at E3 2019. The game will feature single player, and online multiplayer, with an evergrowing roster. All extra regions and characters will be free downloadable content.

Iron Man, Doctor Strange, Captain Marvel, Hulk and Captain America of the Avengers appear in Marvel's Midnight Suns as part of the titular team.

== Theme parks ==
- Walt Disney Imagineering, in collaboration with Marvel Studios and Marvel Themed Entertainment, developed Marvel-themed lands at Disney California Adventure, Walt Disney Studios Park, and Hong Kong Disneyland, called Avengers Campus, the first of which opened in 2021 at Disney California Adventure. Rides based on the Avengers are expected to play a role in all three parks.

== Miscellaneous ==
The Avengers appear in Marvel Universe Live!, consisting of Iron Man, Captain America, the Hulk, Thor, Hawkeye, Black Widow, Falcon, and Captain Marvel. The characters also appeared in a Golden Records LP produced in 1966, adapting The Avengers #4.

== See also ==
- Captain America in other media
- Hulk in other media
- Iron Man in other media
- Thor (Marvel Comics) in other media
