= John Jameson (character) =

Marvel comics character

- John Jameson as depicted in Web of Spider-Man Annual #3 (October 1987). Art by Don Perlin (pencils), Keith Wilson (inks), and Paul Becton (colors).

Publication information
- Publisher: Marvel Comics
- First appearance: The Amazing Spider-Man #1 (March 1963)
- Created by: John Jameson: Stan Lee (writer); Steve Ditko (artist); Man-Wolf: Gerry Conway (writer); Roy Thomas (artist)

In-story information
- Full name: John Jonah Jameson III
- Species: Human (normal form); Werewolf (Man-Wolf and Stargod form)
- Place of origin: New York City
- Team affiliations: Agents of Wakanda; Symbiote; Task Force
- Supporting character of: Spider-Man; Captain America; She-Hulk
- Notable aliases: Colonel Jupiter; Man-Wolf; Stargod; Carnage
- Abilities: Experienced astronaut, combatant, and pilot; As Colonel Jupiter: Enhanced strength, stamina, durability, agility, leaping, and size; As the Man-Wolf: Superhuman strength, stamina, durability, speed, agility, reflexes, and senses; Accelerated healing; Razor-sharp teeth and claws; Lunar empowerment; As the Stargod: Immeasurable strength and durability; Cosmic manipulation; Enchanted armor; Use of various weapons

John Jonah Jameson III (also known as Colonel Jupiter, the Man-Wolf and the Stargod) is a fictional character appearing in American comic books published by Marvel Comics. The character is depicted as the son of J. Jonah Jameson, and a friend to Peter Parker. He has also been portrayed as the husband of Jennifer Walters / She-Hulk.

== Publication history ==
John Jameson debuted in The Amazing Spider-Man #1 (March 1963), and was created by Stan Lee and Steve Ditko. This first story introduces the character as a prominent astronaut.

During his lengthy stint on The Amazing Spider-Man during the 1970s, writer Gerry Conway had Jameson turned into a werewolf, with the new alias "the Man-Wolf". Conway explained:

I'd wanted to do something with [John Jameson] for a long time. I felt like he was a character who'd gotten lost over the years. Also, at this point, it's 1973, John Jameson is an astronaut, and we've been to the moon, so I asked myself, "What would we do with that in Spider-Man's world?" And that was how it played out. It also added another layer of tension to Spider-Man's relationship with J. Jonah Jameson. As a writer, you always want to find a way to increase the pressure on the main character, to increase the involvement of other characters with that character. Consequently, anything that could make Jonah's hatred of Spider-Man more intense and at the same time more understandable was a useful device dramatically.

As the Man-Wolf, Jameson was the lead feature in Creatures on the Loose #30–37 (July 1974 – September 1975).

== Fictional character biography ==
Born in New York City, John Jonah Jameson III is the son of The Daily Bugle's irascible, gruff publisher J. Jonah Jameson Jr. and Joan and the grandson of J. Jonah Jameson Sr. Jonah is immensely proud of his son, whom he sees as a true hero. Initially an astronaut, John is first seen being saved by Spider-Man when his craft malfunctions on re-entry.

Jameson is sent by NASA to evaluate the possibility of recruiting Spider-Man for the space program. This leads to him witnessing the new superhero team 'the Spacemen', who claim to be astronauts who were exposed to cosmic energy during a mission and are hunting Spider-Man for thefts. Spider-Man soon proves that the Spacemen are the real criminals and were actually astronaut washouts who acquired their powers by stealing from NASA. Jameson concludes that Spider-Man would not be a good fit for the space program, as his superhuman physiology meant that any data found from testing him would not be applicable to anyone else.

On a later mission, Jameson is infected with spores that give him superhuman strength, but strain his body and mind. He is forced to wear a strength-restraining Jupiter suit and battles Spider-Man at his father's urging before recovering and calling himself "Colonel Jupiter". His father convinces him to go after Spider-Man, who had been seen apparently robbing a bank. Spider-Man saves him, and Jameson soon learns that Spider-Man had been saving the bank from a bomb. However, Jameson does not care about the misunderstanding and is really out for revenge. Spider-Man neutralizes the spores with electricity, returning Jameson to normal.

While on the Moon, Jameson discovers the Godstone, a mystical other-dimensional ruby. The jewel grafts itself to his throat and transforms him into a white-furred werewolf known as the Man-Wolf after being exposed to moonlight. Spider-Man removes the ruby, but it is reattached by Morbius sometime later.

Later, Jameson is transported to the dimension known as the Other Realm, from which the Godstone originated. It is revealed that the ruby was created by the dying Stargod to pass on his powers to someone else. While on Earth, Jameson could only partially transform, resulting in his bestial form, while in the Other Realm he could fully transform, retaining his human intelligence and capability of speech. He takes up the mantle of the Stargod, acting as the champion of the Other Realm, and gains new powers such as telepathy and energy manipulation. As the Stargod, Jameson wields a sword, dagger, and longbow.

Jameson opts to return to Earth, resulting in him losing the ability to fully transform and losing all memory of his time as the Stargod. He becomes the Man-Wolf again during this period and briefly reassumes the Stargod name, teaming up with She-Hulk and Hellcat. Jameson later allows himself to be subjected to a procedure that destroys the Godstone.

Jameson becomes the pilot of Captain America's personal Quinjet for a period, using the call-sign of "Skywolf". During this time, he is temporarily transformed into the Man-Wolf by Dredmund the Druid, who wants the Stargod's power for himself. Jameson leaves Captain America's employ due to his attraction to Diamondback (Captain America's then-girlfriend).

Jameson remains friends with Spider-Man and often tries to convince his father to "let up on [Spider-Man]". He spends some time as Ravencroft's head of security and briefly dates its director, Ashley Kafka. The Carnage symbiote briefly overwhelms Jameson, using him to commit further murders before leaving him to bond with Ben Reilly. Both Jameson and Kafka are fired by a director who was angry about the Chameleon's escape and subsequent wounding by Kraven the Hunter.

Jameson begins dating She-Hulk (Jennifer Walters) and the two live together for some time before eloping. However, Jameson is forced into becoming the Man-Wolf once more after being injected with a mysterious substance. After a brief rampage, Jameson stops fighting his situation and becomes the Stargod again. He now retains his intelligence as the Man-Wolf, has the Stargod's powers, and can apparently transform forms at will. However, Jameson does not want to be the Stargod anymore because he feels that having the powers of a god made him arrogant and savage. Jameson and She-Hulk separate after She-Hulk discovers that her feelings for Jameson were influenced prior to their marriage by Starfox. Jameson attempts to reconcile with She-Hulk, but ultimately agrees to annul their marriage.

Jameson comes to work in the military, testing anti-symbiote technology for the U.S. Armed Forces. Jameson initially believed that, with the Godstone destroyed, he would not transform into the Man-Wolf again. Due to the regenerative nature of both it and its powers, his body would continually regrow a new jewel, which continued his transformations.

Jameson as the Man-Wolf joins the Agents of Wakanda. After being taken over by Carnage, Jameson is forced to lay a trap for Venom and Spider-Man at Ravencroft, killing several Ravencroft guards in the process. Jameson eventually throws off Carnage's control and the symbiote is purged from his body.

Traumatized by his actions while mind-controlled, Jameson finds it harder to change into the Man-Wolf. He became a security consultant at Ravencroft. During a prison riot that threatens to destroy the facility, Jameson overcomes his traumas and regains his Man-Wolf form. When Norman Osborn becomes the director of Ravencroft, he dismisses Jameson and several other staff members, who may interfere with his plans for the facility.

Investigating an anomaly on the Moon, the Agents of Wakanda are attacked by Entea, an intelligent plant that had taken root there. Jameson becomes the Stargod again and the conflict with Entea ends once the Agents of Wakanda realize that she was starving due to a lack of sustenance. Jameson opens a portal to the Other Realm for Entea to feed there, only to discover that an unknown disaster has reduced it to a wasteland devoid of life. Entea uses the remaining nutrients in the soil to take root and bring life back to the Other Realm.

== Powers and abilities ==
John Jameson is a skilled pilot and astronaut and is experienced in hand-to-hand combat and the use of a variety of weapons. During his space flight to Jupiter, alien spores found on the planet had attracted to and clung onto John on his return trip home. These spores changed his anatomical physiology, causing him to enlarge and become physically denser than normal; he also ran the risk of cardiovascular and neurological complications without use of a specially designed weighted suit which monitored his bio-readings. Also, using his powers increased psychological instability, causing him to become increasingly more violent and aggressive whenever his emotions ran away with him.

While Jameson was doing search and rescue missions in the Middle East, the American military discovered that another Godstone had grown within his body, the original having altered his physiology to the point that he now spawns replacement gems.

=== As Colonel Jupiter ===
Due to alien spore infection, which was garnered during his space mission to Jupiter, Jameson had developed a supernormal physiology accommodating to the higher gravity and harsher atmospheric conditions of the planet. Doubling his original size and physical strength, particularly in his lower body which allows for jumping and leaping great distances at a time, even being able to move fast enough to intercept Spider-Man with relative ease. Colonel Jupiter also boasts increased skin, bone and muscle density; enough to resist blows from Spider-Man, as well as dish out enough force to rupture steel or shatter masonry.

=== As Man-Wolf ===
As the Man-Wolf, Jameson possessed superhuman strength, agility, speed and durability, an accelerated healing factor and heightened senses. The Man-Wolf's levels of strength and intelligence vary according to the phases of the moon. Jameson does not retain his human personality or intelligence while in his Man-Wolf form; though the bestial side is capable of speech, it does not talk often. He was not a traditional supernatural werewolf and was thus invulnerable not only to silver, but to weapons in general.

=== As Stargod ===
While in the Other Realm, Jameson retains his human intelligence and capability of speech while transformed and gains cosmic and telepathic powers. Jameson, eventually learning to utilize the Stargod power by force of will, could transform at will, fly across interstellar distances, survive in the depths of space unprotected, and teleport between dimensions. He wears scale mail armor and uses a broadsword, a dagger, and a longbow with arrows as weapons.

== Other versions ==
=== Earth X ===
On Earth X, Jameson lives on the Moon and is the father of Jay Jameson. He first appeared in Earth X #0.

=== House of M ===
In the House of M universe, Jameson participates in the spaceflight that would have given the Fantastic Four their powers, taking the place of Johnny Storm. He, Reed Richards, and Susan Storm are killed, leaving Ben Grimm the sole survivor.

=== MC2 ===
In the alternative universe of MC2, Jameson married Dr. Ashley Kafka and they had a son, Jack. Jack became the costumed adventurer known as the Buzz.

=== newuniversal ===
In the alternate world of newuniversal, Lieutenant General John Jameson is assistant to the Chairman of the Joint Chiefs of Staff, General Thad Ross, and is involved in arranging an airstrike to kill Ken Connell. The attempt is unsuccessful.

=== Spider-Gwen ===
On Earth-65, the setting of Spider-Gwen, Jameson as the Man-Wolf is a crime boss operating in New York. When he starts targeting Spider-Woman (Gwen Stacy) and her friends, she defeats him and has him arrested. Shortly after his arrest, his father, Mayor J. Jonah Jameson, has him released, claiming he "wasn't in the right mind" during his time as the Man-Wolf.

=== What If? ===
In "What If the Radioactive Spider Had Bitten Someone Else?", John Jameson is one of three candidates - along with Betty Brant and Flash Thompson - who is bitten by the radioactive spider which gave Spider-Man his powers. Equipped with a rocket pack, and upon his father's relentless prompting for the sake of his paper's publicity, John begins to fight crime as "Spider-Jameson". However, when he attempts to save an astronaut from his crashing capsule, his rocket pack runs out of fuel. John sacrifices himself by using his own body to cushion the capsule's impact. The death of his son makes Jonah Jameson re-think his relentless attitudes, and he subsequently dedicates The Daily Bugle to the promotion of superheroes rather than their persecution.

== In other media ==
=== Television ===
- John Jameson appears in Spider-Man (1994), voiced by Michael Horton.
- John Jameson / Man-Wolf appears in Spider-Man Unlimited, with the former voiced by John Payne and the latter's vocal effects provided by Scott McNeil. This version crashes on Counter-Earth while traveling into space and is captured by the High Evolutionary, who unsuccessfully attempts to turn him into a Beastial. Though John is rescued before the process can be completed, he is left with uncontrollable transformation abilities. He joins the human resistance against the High Evolutionary and is given a bio-electric implant that largely suppresses his abilities.
- John Jameson / Colonel Jupiter appears in The Spectacular Spider-Man, voiced by Daran Norris. This version nearly crash-lands after his shuttle is hit by a meteor storm. He lands safely, but unknowingly brings the Venom symbiote to Earth and is exposed to alien spores which physically enhance him. As a result, Dr. Curt Connors develops a special containment suit for him while John's father, J. Jonah Jameson, convinces him to become the superhero Colonel Jupiter. Following an attack by Venom, who frames Spider-Man for it, the spores' effects increase, leading to John attacking Spider-Man. After a fight, Spider-Man discovers his opponent's weakness to electricity and restores him to normal, after which he is sent to Ravencroft, having become addicted to the spores' power.
- John Jameson / Man-Wolf appears in Ultimate Spider-Man, voiced by Nolan North. This version of John's Man-Wolf form sports trappings and the sword of his Stargod form. In the episode "The Man-Wolf", while working on Daily Bugle Communications' lunar space station, John and his construction team discover the ruins of an advanced civilization harboring numerous strange jewels, one of which embeds itself in John's chest and triggers his feral Man-Wolf transformation. Spider-Man eventually destroys the jewel, but the sudden reversion causes John to retain partial lupine features, after which he is kept in S.H.I.E.L.D. custody for treatment. Following this, John makes minor reappearances throughout the series.
- John Jameson / Man-Wolf appears in Spider-Man (2017), voiced by Josh Keaton. This version is a teenage student of Norman Osborn's Osborn Academy. In the episode "Halloween Moon", he and Harry Osborn work on an experiment involving a radiation-draining lunar crystal. However, it turns John into the Man-Wolf, whose scratch can turn others into werewolves as well. Harry joins forces with Spider-Man, the Hulk, and Gwen Stacy to reverse the transformation and cure the infected.

=== Film ===
- John Jameson appears in Spider-Man 2, portrayed by Daniel Gillies. This version is an astronaut noted for apparently being the first man to play football on the moon. He quickly develops a relationship with Mary Jane Watson, who immediately accepts his marriage proposal. However, she eventually realizes that she does not truly love him and leaves him at the altar to be with Peter Parker.
- John Jameson, credited as J.J. Jameson III, makes a cameo appearance in Venom, portrayed by Chris O'Hara. This version is an employee of the Life Foundation.

=== Video games ===
- John Jameson appears in the Spider-Man 2 film tie-in game, voiced by Charles Klausmeyer.
- Spider-Jameson from the What If? comics appears as a playable character in Spider-Man Unlimited.

== Reception ==
The Man-Wolf was ranked #21 on Den of Geek's listing of Marvel Comics' monster characters in 2015.

In 2022, Screen Rant included Man-Wolf in their "10 Spider-Man Villains That Are Smarter Than They Seem" list.
