= Truth (The Falcon and the Winter Soldier) =

- The Falcon and the Winter Soldier episode
- The fifth of several art posters released for the series, with art by graphic designer Doaly
- Episode no.: Episode 5
- Directed by: Kari Skogland
- Written by: Dalan Musson
- Cinematography by: P.J. Dillon
- Editing by: Jeffrey Ford; Todd Desrosiers
- Original release date: April 16, 2021
- Running time: 60 minutes

Cast
- Clé Bennett as Lemar Hoskins / Battlestar; Carl Lumbly as Isaiah Bradley; Desmond Chiam as Dovich; Dani Deetee as Gigi; Indya Bussey as DeeDee; Renes Rivera as Lennox; Tyler Dean Flores as Diego; Chase River McGhee as Cass; Aaron Haynes as AJ; Gabrielle Byndloss as Olivia Walker; Janeshia Adams-Ginyard as Nomble; Zola Williams as Yama; Elijah Richardson as Eli Bradley; Salem Murphy as Prime Minister Lacont; Jane Rumbaua as Ayla; Noah Mills as Nico

Episode chronology
← Previous "The Whole World Is Watching"	Next → "One World, One People"

"Truth" is the fifth episode of the American television miniseries The Falcon and the Winter Soldier, based on Marvel Comics featuring the characters Sam Wilson / Falcon and Bucky Barnes / Winter Soldier. It follows the pair as they return home after fighting with the Flag Smashers, while John Walker faces consequences for his actions. The episode is set in the Marvel Cinematic Universe (MCU), sharing continuity with the films of the franchise. It was written by Dalan Musson and directed by Kari Skogland.

Sebastian Stan and Anthony Mackie reprise their respective roles as Bucky Barnes and Sam Wilson from the film series, with Emily VanCamp, Wyatt Russell (Walker), Erin Kellyman, Julia Louis-Dreyfus, Florence Kasumba, Danny Ramirez, Georges St-Pierre, Adepero Oduye, and Daniel Brühl also starring. Development began by October 2018, and Skogland joined in May 2019. Louis-Dreyfus is introduced as Valentina Allegra de Fontaine in a surprise cameo appearance, which had been alluded to by the creative team beforehand. Filming took place at Pinewood Atlanta Studios in Atlanta, Georgia, with location filming in the Atlanta metropolitan area and in Prague.

"Truth" was released on the streaming service Disney+ on April 16, 2021. Viewership was estimated to be the highest for the series. Critics praised the focus on characters and themes, while Louis-Dreyfus's appearance also received positive responses. The episode received a Primetime Creative Arts Emmy Award nomination for its stunt performers.

== Plot ==
After using Captain America's shield to kill one of the Flag Smashers in public, John Walker flees the scene. He is pursued by Sam Wilson and Bucky Barnes, who demand that Walker hand over the shield. He refuses, and destroys Wilson's wingsuit in the ensuing fight. Wilson and Barnes take the shield from Walker, breaking his arm in the process. Wilson leaves his damaged wingsuit with Joaquin Torres and asks him to continue looking for the Flag Smashers.

Barnes finds Helmut Zemo at a memorial in Sokovia and hands him over to the Dora Milaje. While Ayo advises him not to return to Wakanda for some time due to his decision to work with Zemo, she agrees to ask the country for a favor on Barnes's behalf. After Walker receives an other than honorable discharge and is stripped of his role as Captain America, he is approached by Contessa Valentina Allegra de Fontaine. She tells him that taking the Super Soldier Serum and killing the Flag Smasher were the right actions to take and says she will contact Walker in the future. Walker visits the family of his dead partner, Lemar Hoskins, and falsely claims that he killed the man who murdered Hoskins.

Wilson returns to Baltimore to visit Isaiah Bradley. They discuss Bradley's past as a Black super soldier who was experimented on by the government and how he was imprisoned after rescuing fellow soldiers who had also been experimented on. Bradley states that a Black man would never be allowed to become Captain America and nor should one want to. Wilson returns home to Louisiana and helps his sister Sarah fix the family boat, with assistance from several locals. Barnes arrives to help, and delivers a briefcase from the Wakandans to Wilson. Barnes helps Wilson train to use the shield and the pair agree to move on from their pasts and work together.

The Flag Smashers plan an attack on a Global Repatriation Council (GRC) conference in New York City. They are joined by Georges Batroc, who wants to kill Wilson and was released from prison by Sharon Carter. When Torres contacts Wilson and tells him the Flag Smashers have been detected in New York City, Wilson chooses to intervene and opens the Wakandan briefcase. In a mid-credits scene, Walker builds a new shield from scrap metal and his Medal of Honor.

== Production ==
=== Development ===
By October 2018, Marvel Studios was developing a limited series starring Anthony Mackie's Sam Wilson / Falcon and Sebastian Stan's Bucky Barnes / Winter Soldier from the Marvel Cinematic Universe (MCU) films. Malcolm Spellman was hired as head writer of the series, which was announced as The Falcon and the Winter Soldier in April 2019. Spellman modeled the series after buddy films that deal with race, such as 48 Hrs. (1982), The Defiant Ones (1958), Lethal Weapon (1987), and Rush Hour (1998). Kari Skogland was hired to direct the miniseries a month later, and executive produced alongside Spellman and Marvel Studios' Kevin Feige, Louis D'Esposito, Victoria Alonso, and Nate Moore. The fifth episode, titled "Truth", was written by Dalan Musson. It takes its name from the comic book Truth: Red, White & Black by Robert Morales and Kyle Baker, which tells the story of the character Isaiah Bradley, a Black man who became Captain America after being imprisoned and experimented on.

=== Writing ===
Spellman said this episode was where the series "just gets real", while Moore said it ties together the series' various plot threads and "gets to be the culmination of the theme" of legacy. Skogland said Wilson's gaining of Captain America's shield in the episode allowed him to understand that "what defines a hero today is not the same ideal as it was when [Steve Rogers] first picked up the shield". She sought to convey Wilson as accepting this "iconic historically white symbol" as a Black man through both public and private discussions. Wilson has several conversations about taking on the mantle of Captain America in the episode. Spellman described the character's visit to Isaiah Bradley as "confronting the dragon" with the shield as a "talisman". He said Bradley personified Wilson's doubts, especially as he is candid about his poor treatment at the hands of the U.S. government, and in stating his belief that America would not react positively to a Black Captain America. Spellman wanted this to be something that Wilson has to live with as he moves forward in the role. Spellman believed that Wilson's conversation with his sister Sarah was the "final straw" in encouraging him to become Captain America. He identified a moment in the scene in which she says, "I never thought you were running away", interpreting this as her giving him implicit permission to accept the role. Spellman wanted both Bradley and Sarah to have valid arguments for Wilson to consider, and he sought to have the "truth of the characters to make this journey difficult" which connects to the episode's title. Later, Barnes tells Wilson that he never considered the implications of a Black man becoming Captain America. Mackie said this was cathartic and a "huge turning point" for Wilson.

Discussing John Walker's character journey in the episode, Spellman wanted him to be "misguided at times and righteous at times" which he felt was exemplified in the scene where he lies to the family of Lemar Hoskins. Spellman said these lies represent the "brutal, personal toll" that Walker's other than honorable discharge inflicts upon him. Spellman decided to add the character Valentina Allegra de Fontaine to the series after looking for a member of the CIA or S.H.I.E.L.D. in the comic books who could be the one to "embrace [Walker] after all he's been through" and set him on his new journey. Co-executive producer Zoie Nagelhout felt de Fontaine was the perfect character to enter Walker's life in the episode, saying this was a way to "complicate what he's going through and give him a weird almost ominous light at the end of the tunnel". She continued that since Walker is someone who needs to have a purpose in his life, meeting de Fontaine excites him and creates a feeling of catharsis for him. Skogland said the episode's mid-credits scene, in which Walker makes a new shield using his Medal of Honor, references the character's previous comments to Hoskins about how receiving the medal had been the "worst day" of his life. She also felt the scene was about him "hanging onto a falsehood".

=== Casting ===
The episode stars Sebastian Stan as Bucky Barnes, Anthony Mackie as Sam Wilson, Emily VanCamp as Sharon Carter, Wyatt Russell as John Walker, Erin Kellyman as Karli Morgenthau, Julia Louis-Dreyfus as Valentina Allegra de Fontaine, Florence Kasumba as Ayo, Danny Ramirez as Joaquin Torres, Georges St-Pierre as Georges Batroc, Adepero Oduye as Sarah Wilson, and Daniel Brühl as Helmut Zemo. Also appearing are Clé Bennett as Lemar Hoskins, Carl Lumbly as Isaiah Bradley, Desmond Chiam as Dovich, Dani Deetee as Gigi, Indya Bussey as DeeDee, Renes Rivera as Lennox, Tyler Dean Flores as Diego, Chase River McGhee as Cass, Aaron Haynes as AJ, Gabrielle Byndloss as Olivia Walker, Janeshia Adams-Ginyard as Nomble, Zola Williams as Yama, Elijah Richardson as Eli Bradley, Jane Rumbaua as Ayla, Salem Murphy as Lacont, and Noah Mills as Nico.

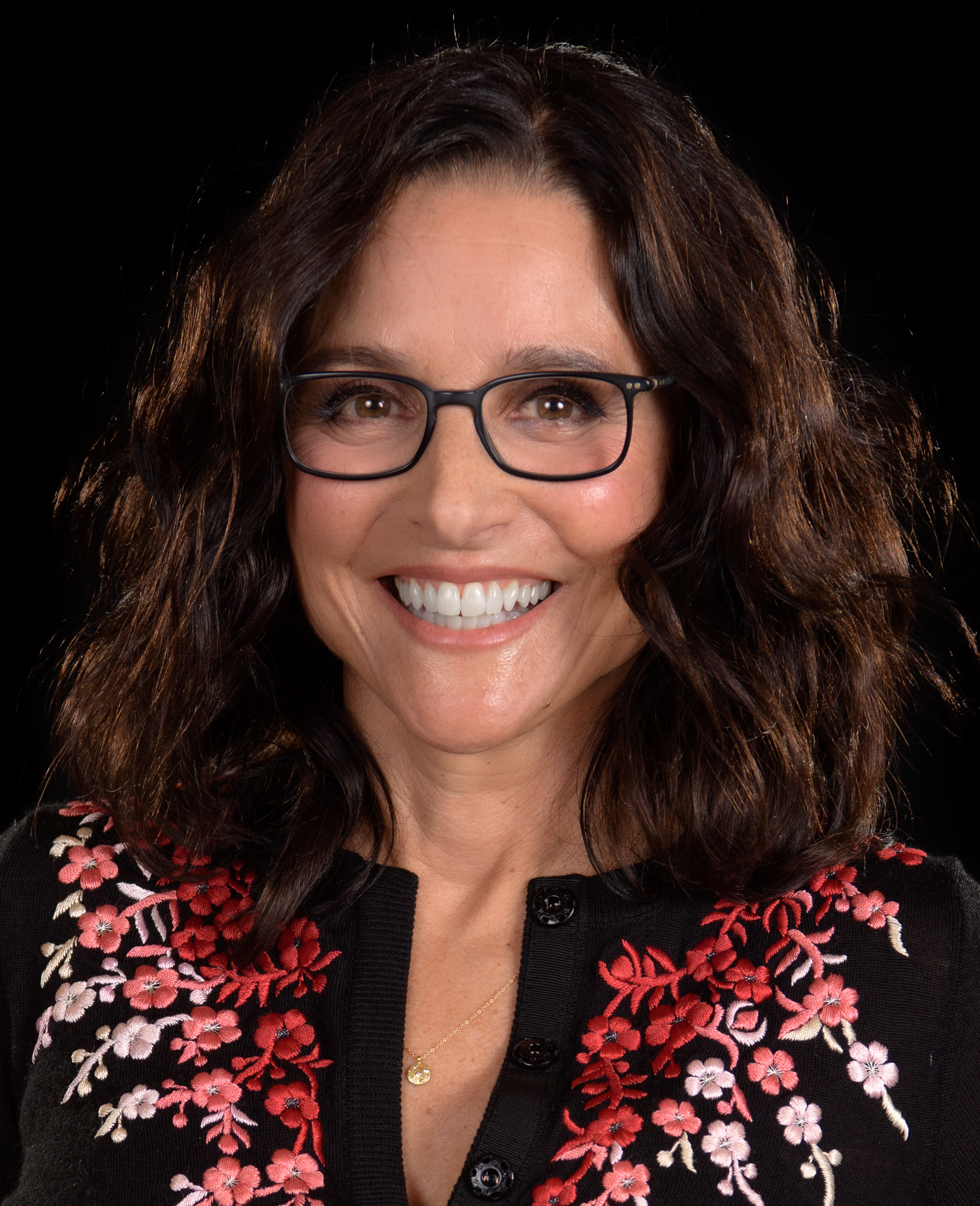
The episode introduces Julia Louis-Dreyfus as Valentina Allegra de Fontaine, who was originally set to be introduced in the film Black Widow before it was delayed.

Ahead of the episode's release, Spellman teased that it would feature a big cameo appearance and said this would be a grounded character with a strong personality. He added that it would not be an Avenger. In response to speculation from fans, Moore said the cameo would not be Chadwick Boseman's T'Challa / Black Panther. Hoai-Tran Bui at /Film reported that the cameo would not be an existing MCU character and would instead be the introduction of an established comic book character to the MCU, portrayed by a well-known actor. The episode reveals this to be Louis-Dreyfus as de Fontaine. Commentators likened the character's appearance to an "anti-Nick Fury", with speculation that she could be the Power Broker or another building block leading to the introduction of the Thunderbolts team in the MCU. Joanna Robinson of Vanity Fair reported that Louis-Dreyfus had been expected to first appear as de Fontaine in Black Widow (2021) before COVID-19 pandemic delays pushed that film's premiere until after The Falcon and the Winter Soldier was released. Robinson said it was unclear if Louis-Dreyfus was still expected to appear in the film; she does appear in the film's post-credits scene, with Feige noting that this was originally intended to be the character's introduction but ended up being a reference to her appearance in The Falcon and the Winter Soldier. Spellman was unaware of the character's planned appearance in Black Widow when he decided to add her to the series.

=== Filming and editing ===
Filming for the series officially began in November 2019, taking place at Pinewood Atlanta Studios in Atlanta, Georgia, with Skogland directing, and P.J. Dillon serving as cinematographer. Location filming took place in the Atlanta metropolitan area and in Prague. The series was shot like a film, with Skogland and Dillon filming all of the content at once based on available locations. Stan injured his ankle when jumping from a dock to a boat on the first day of filming, saying that he twisted it bad enough that he thought it was broken and initially could not walk on it. Production was halted due to the COVID-19 pandemic in March 2020, and was scheduled to resume that August. Dillon returned to his home in Europe when the production shut down and was unable to come back to the U.S. when filming resumed. Moore believed "Truth" had the strongest acting and filmmaking of the series.

The opening fight sequence was the only action scene in the series that was entirely filmed by the main production unit, with no involvement by the second unit team. It took six or seven days to film. The warehouse location was only found days before filming began, after the original location became unavailable, so there was less time to prepare for the sequence than on the series' other action scenes. This meant there was more invention happening on set, with the stunt team devising the choreography during filming. The production had issues filming in the warehouse due to rain leaking through the ceiling. The shot of Barnes holding the shield and standing over an injured Wilson as sunlight comes into the building was quickly filmed when "warm, streaming shafts of light" entered through the windows of the building while the production was filming in a different area. For the montage where Wilson and Barnes practice with the shield, Skogland used a more organic approach where she let the actors perform and then she and Dillon responded with camera placements, rather than planning out each of the shots and angles needed for the montage. This was one of the first scenes that editor Todd Desrosiers worked on for the series, and he said it was difficult because the shield throwing was interrupting the flow of the dialogue, which needed to be the focus.

For Walker's courtroom scene, Desrosiers originally used overlapping cuts to make the character's argument with the tribunal more "psychological". Feige and Alonso asked him to "reign it back in" because they felt it would confuse the audience about the influence that the Super Soldier Serum was having on Walker. They wanted to focus on his anger and leave the serum's influence up to interpretation. Louis-Dreyfus was on set for a couple days to film her role, and she was described as a "walking code-red-level Marvel secret" due to the secrecy surrounding her appearance. Russell described the character of de Fontaine as "endlessly interesting because [Louis-Dreyfus is] endlessly interesting". Moore said Louis-Dreyfus has a natural likability to her, and so the unexpected "darker tendencies to her character [are] a little bit more surprising and entertaining".

=== Visual effects ===
Eric Leven served as the visual effects supervisor for The Falcon and the Winter Soldier, with the episode's visual effects created by Tippett Studio, Trixter, Digital Frontier FX, QPPE, Stereo D, Cantina Creative, Crafty Apes, and Rodeo FX. The action sequence between Wilson, Barnes, and Walker used a stunt shield prop, with the blood being inserted digitally as the right amount of it couldn't be inserted during filming. Leven said the shield was created through visual effects "nine times out of ten" in the sequence, to help keep a consistent design for it and because they wanted to depict the shield as operating like a boomerang. The actual stunt shield was also delicate as it was constructed from a thin layer of aluminum and would be damaged if used roughly. The team used an alternative rubber stunt shield for some shots.

=== Music ===
Selections from composer Henry Jackman's score for the episode were included in the series' Vol. 2 soundtrack album, which was released digitally by Marvel Music and Hollywood Records on April 30, 2021.

== Marketing ==
On March 19, 2021, Marvel announced a series of posters that were created by various artists to correspond with the episodes of the series. The posters were released weekly ahead of each episode, with the fifth poster, designed by graphic designer Doaly, being revealed on April 14. After the episode's release, Marvel announced merchandise inspired by the episode as part of its weekly "Marvel Must Haves" promotion for each episode of the series, including apparel, accessories, and a Marvel Legends Captain America shield.

== Release ==
"Truth" was released on Disney+ on April 16, 2021. The episode, along with the rest of The Falcon and the Winter Soldier, was released on Ultra HD Blu-ray and Blu-ray on April 30, 2024.

== Reception ==
=== Viewership ===
Nielsen Media Research, which measures the number of minutes watched by United States audiences on television sets, listed The Falcon and the Winter Soldier as the most-watched original series across streaming services for the week of April 12 to 18, 2021. Between the first five episodes, which were available at the time, the series had 855 million minutes viewed, which was the highest total the series had achieved thus far.

=== Critical response ===
The review aggregator website Rotten Tomatoes reported a 100% approval rating with an average score of 8.4/10 based on 29 reviews. The site's critical consensus reads, "With epic fight scenes and emotional moments galore, 'Truth' fully lives up to the show's potential—while finally letting Sam grow into his."

Rolling Stone's Alan Sepinwall felt "Truth" was easily the best episode of the series so far, feeling it was introspection-heavy but did not drag like previous episodes with that focus. He felt the opening fight between Wilson, Barnes, and Walker was inevitable and hit harder than the series' previous action sequences due to its emotional stakes, and he also felt Wilson's return to Louisiana was more "lived-in and entertaining" than similar scenes in the series' premiere. In contrast, he described Walker's visit to Hoskins's family as one of the series' "clunkiest" moments. Sepinwall noted that the Louisiana scenes would likely have been cut if this was a feature film rather than a series, and concluded that by setting up Wilson as a version of Captain America in contrast to Walker, the series was exploring "more complicated territory than the MCU has generally entered in the past... [and] by taking a step back from the story for a week, 'Truth' was able to dig in and really wrestle with all the implications of the choice Sam is making". Sulagna Misra at The A.V. Club gave the episode an "A" saying that even though Wilson's story was on a smaller scale than that of Barnes's, it being smaller and more relatable made the pair's "frank discussion" about what it means to be a Black person with the shield "feel so earned".

Writing for Entertainment Weekly, Chancellor Agard agreed with Sepinwall that this was the best episode of the series so far, with Wilson and Barnes "taking some long-awaited and necessary steps forward". Agard likened the opening fight of the episode to the final fight between Rogers, Barnes, and Tony Stark in the film Captain America: Civil War (2016), but he felt the series was not intentionally trying to mimic that fight, especially since it was "not nearly as impactful because we only really care about two of the characters" in the episode's fight. His favorite moments of the episode were Wilson's conversation with Bradley, and the scenes set in Louisiana. Agard gave "Truth" a "B+". Matt Purslow of IGN gave the episode a 7 out of 10, believing the focus on character weighed the episode down. Though he said the episode "features some of the show's most impactful moments so far, and further molds its characters in admirable ways", Purslow felt the episode overall "meanders, delays looming threats, and delivers underwhelming conclusions". One of the high points for Purslow was Wilson's conversation with Bradley, which was "a landmark moment" for the MCU, with the scene performed with "profound gravity" by both Mackie and Lumbly.

Sepinwall said Louis-Dreyfus's cameo appearance was "both startling and delightful", with a performance that was "caustic, smooth, and funny". Robinson believed de Fontaine had a lot of potential for the MCU and felt Louis-Dreyfus was an ideal choice to be one of the MCU's next over-arching villains. Agard agreed with Robinson, believing casting Louis-Dreyfus in the role meant the MCU had big plans for her. However, Purslow did not think the cameo made any impact since there was no background for who de Fontaine was or what threat she may pose. Following the episode's release, sales of Strange Tales #159 (1967)—which was de Fontaine's first comic book appearance, in the "Nick Fury, Agent of S.H.I.E.L.D." feature—increased in value on eBay, particularly those with high grades from Certified Guaranty Company denoting good condition.

=== Accolades ===
At the 73rd Primetime Creative Arts Emmy Awards, John Nania, Aaron Toney, and Justin Eaton were nominated for Outstanding Stunt Performance for their work on the episode.
