= Captain America in film =

Film adaptations of the Marvel superhero

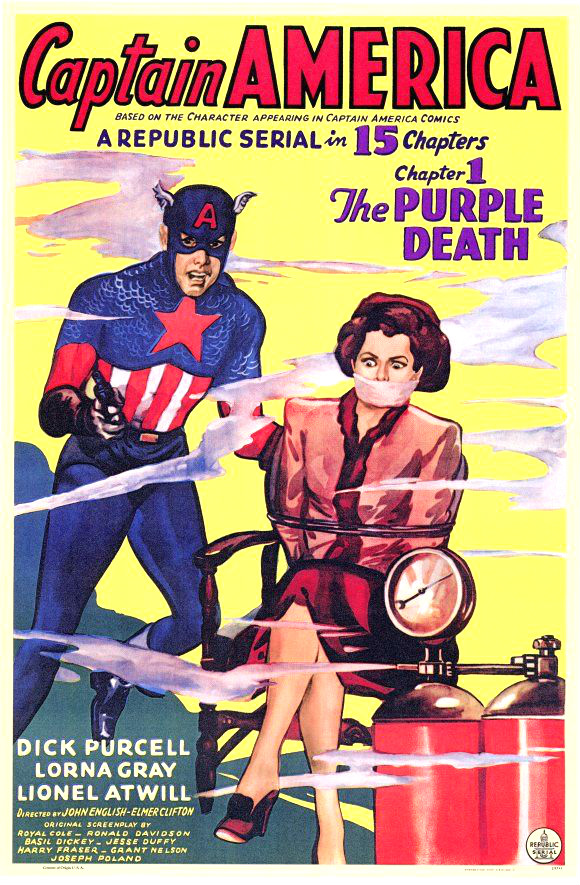
Poster for Captain America: The Purple Death, the first in a fifteen-part serial film released in 1944

Captain America, a superhero created by Joe Simon and Jack Kirby who appears in comic books produced by Marvel Comics, has appeared in multiple films since the character's inception in 1940. Republic Pictures released a fifteen-part Captain America serial film in 1944 that was the first film to feature a Marvel Comics character, though it deviated significantly from the comic book source material. Two made-for-TV films, Captain America and Captain America II: Death Too Soon, aired on the American broadcast television station CBS in 1979. A feature-length film directed by Albert Pyun was originally planned for a wide theatrical release in 1990, but received only a brief theatrical release in the United Kingdom before being released in the United States as a direct-to-video film.

Marvel began to produce films independently in 2005, launching a shared universe of superhero films referred to as the Marvel Cinematic Universe (MCU). A trilogy of Captain America films written by Christopher Markus and Stephen McFeely and starring Chris Evans as the title character were produced as part of the MCU in the 2010s: Captain America: The First Avenger (2011), Captain America: The Winter Soldier (2014), and Captain America: Civil War (2016). A fourth MCU film starring Anthony Mackie as Captain America, Captain America: Brave New World, was released in 2025. The character has also appeared in the Avengers series of crossover films, beginning with The Avengers (2012).

While many Captain America films have faced troubled productions or limited audiences, the initial trilogy of MCU Captain America films were critical and commercial success, collectively grossing over $2.2 billion worldwide. The Winter Soldier was nominated for Best Visual Effects at the Academy Awards in 2014, while Civil War was the highest-grossing film of 2016.

== Early films ==
=== Serial film (1944) ===
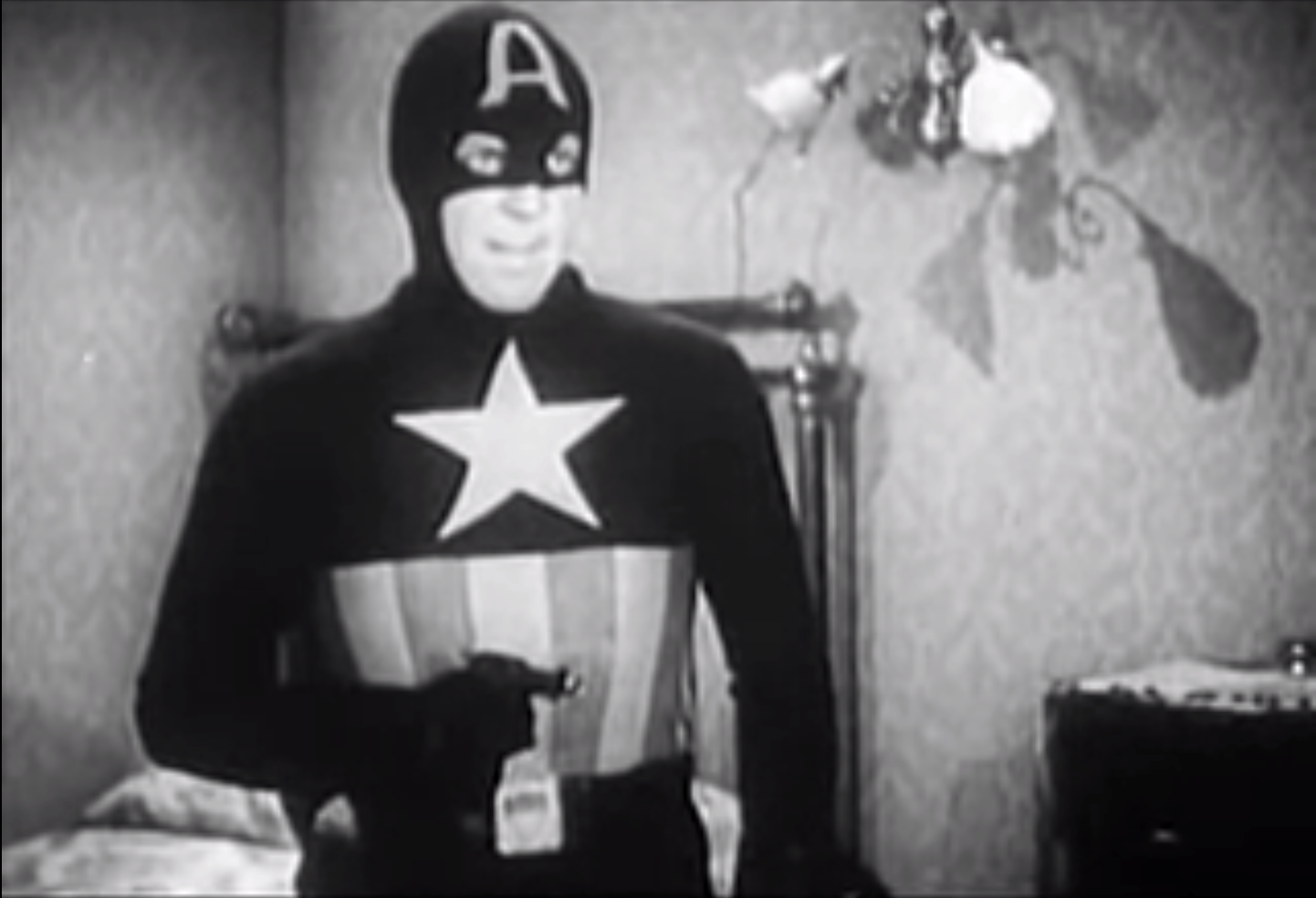
Dick Purcell as Captain America in Captain America: The Purple Death (1944)

In 1944, Republic Pictures released a fifteen-part serial film starring Dick Purcell as Captain America. Based on the comic books published by Timely Comics – the corporate predecessor to Marvel Comics – it is the first film to feature a Marvel Comics character. The serial deviates significantly from the comic book source material: the civilian identity of Captain America is district attorney Grant Gardner rather than U.S. Army private Steve Rogers, the character's superhuman enhancement origin story and Nazi villains are omitted, and the character uses a gun rather than his iconic shield. Timely had little creative involvement in the film, and objected to Republic's treatment of the character. Captain America was produced at a negative cost of US$222,906 (equivalent to $4,076,778 in 2025), making it the most expensive serial ever produced by Republic; it was additionally the final superhero serial the company ever produced. It was re-released in 1953 under the title Return of Captain America.

=== CBS made-for-TV films (1979) ===
In 1979, two Captain America made-for-TV films starring Reb Brown as Steve Rogers aired on the American broadcast television station CBS. The first, titled Captain America, was directed by Rod Holcomb. Set in the late 1970s, the film focuses on Rogers as he receives superhuman enhancement and becomes the costumed superhero Captain America, a moniker formerly used by his father during the Second World War. Its sequel, Captain America II: Death Too Soon, was directed by Iván Nagy and focuses on Rogers as he rescues a scientist who is forced by a terrorist (played by Christopher Lee) to create a formula that causes rapid aging. Both films were produced as part of a partnership between Marvel and CBS to adapt Marvel properties for television, which also saw the creation of The Incredible Hulk (1977–1982), The Amazing Spider-Man (1977–1979), and Dr. Strange (1978). Captain America and Death Too Soon were the final works produced by the partnership; plans to spin off the films into a Captain America ongoing television series were abandoned due to low ratings.

=== Captain America (1990) ===
Producers Menahem Golan and Yoram Globus of The Cannon Group purchased the film rights to Captain America in 1984, and announced their plans to create a Captain America film with Michael Winner as director that same year. Production stalled due to financial troubles at Cannon; Golan left the company in 1989 and carried the rights for the character over to 21st Century Film Corporation, where he produced Captain America in 1990 with Albert Pyun as director. Starring Matt Salinger as Steve Rogers, the film follows Captain America as he faces the villainous Red Skull (Scott Paulin) during the Second World War, becomes frozen in ice, and is revived decades later to face Red Skull again. While originally planned for a wide theatrical release, Captain America received only a brief theatrical release in the United Kingdom in 1990, and was later released in the United States as a direct-to-video film in 1992.

== Marvel Cinematic Universe ==
=== Title roles ===
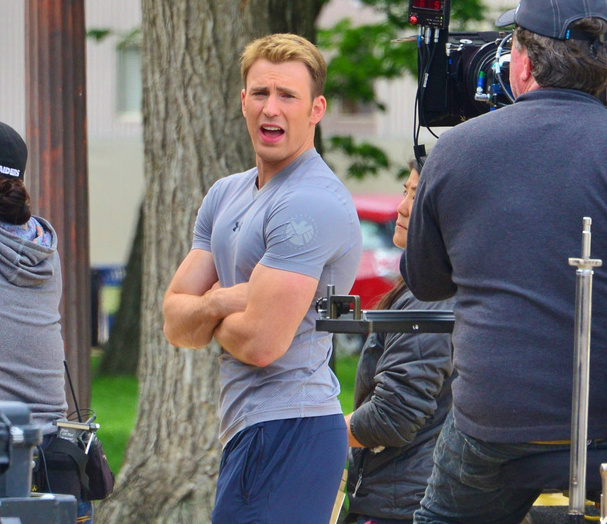
Chris Evans as Steve Rogers, filming Captain America: The Winter Soldier in 2013

==== Captain America: The First Avenger (2011) ====
Marvel began developing a Captain America film in 1997, with Mark Gordon and Gary Levinsohn as producers and Larry Wilson and Leslie Bohem as scriptwriters. Artisan Entertainment were brought on as financers in 2000, but production was stalled by a lawsuit between Marvel and Captain America co-creator Joe Simon over the ownership of Captain America copyrights that was settled in 2003. Marvel began to produce films independently in 2005, planning a shared universe of superhero films referred to as the Marvel Cinematic Universe (MCU), and hired screenwriter David Self in 2006 to write the screenplay for what would become Captain America: The First Avenger. Joe Johnston was brought on to direct the film in 2008, who hired Christopher Markus and Stephen McFeely to rewrite the script. Actor Chris Evans was cast as Steve Rogers in 2010, signing a six-picture deal with Marvel to appear in three Captain America films and three Avengers films. The film focuses on Rogers as he confronts the Red Skull (Hugo Weaving) during the Second World War. The First Avenger with was filmed from 2010 to 2011, and released in July 2011.

==== Captain America: The Winter Soldier (2014) ====
Markus and McFeely were hired to write a sequel to The First Avenger in mid-2011, which was publicly confirmed by Marvel to be in production in April 2012. George Nolfi, F. Gary Gray, and brothers Anthony and Joseph Russo were among those considered by Marvel to direct the film, with the Russo brothers ultimately signed to direct in June 2012. The plot of the film is broadly inspired by the Winter Soldier story arc in the Captain America comics written by Ed Brubaker, which sees Steve Rogers uncover a conspiracy involving his former partner Bucky Barnes (Sebastian Stan, reprising his role from The First Avenger), now a brainwashed assassin known as the Winter Soldier. Filming took place in 2013 and 2014, and the film premiered in March 2014. At the 2014 Academy Awards, The Winter Soldier was nominated for Best Visual Effects.

==== Captain America: Civil War (2016) ====
Markus and McFeely began writing a sequel to The Winter Soldier in late 2013, and the Russo brothers, Markus, McFeely, and Evans were publicly confirmed to be returning for the film in March 2014. In October 2014 it was announced that Robert Downey Jr. had been cast in the film, reprising the role of Iron Man / Tony Stark that he played in the 2008 film Iron Man. With the announcement of Downey's casting, Marvel confirmed that the film would adapt the comic book series Civil War by Mark Millar and Steve McNiven, which sees Captain America and Iron Man lead competing factions who respectively oppose and support efforts to regulate the actions of superheroes. Filming for Civil War occurred in 2015, and the film was released in April 2016. Civil War was the highest-grossing film of 2016, grossing over $1.1 billion worldwide.

==== Captain America: Brave New World (2025) ====
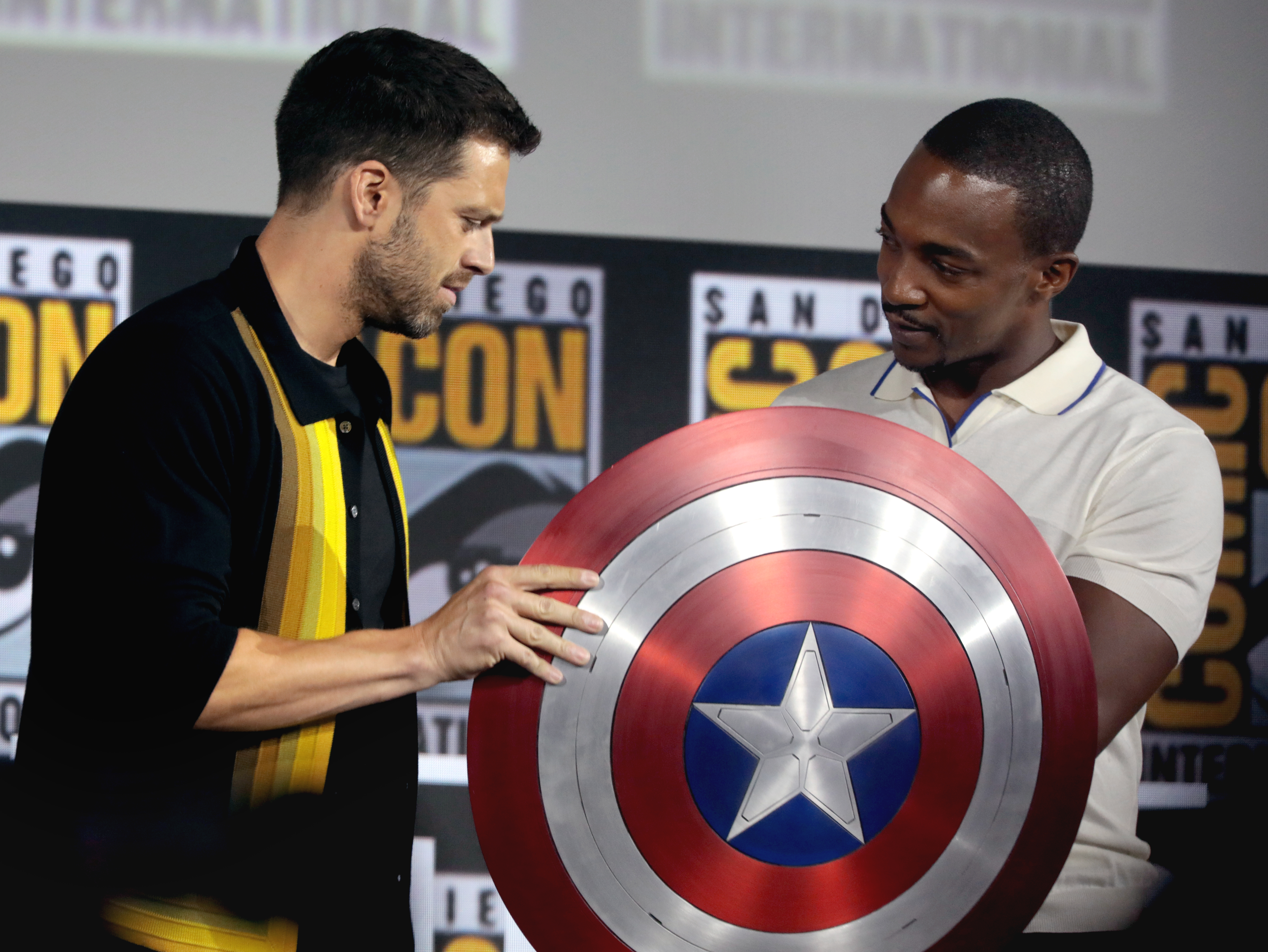
Anthony Mackie (right) portrayed Captain America in the 2025 film Captain America: Brave New World.

Civil War was Evans' final contracted standalone film as Captain America, and concluded the trilogy of Captain America films starring the actor. In 2021, Marvel released the television miniseries The Falcon and the Winter Soldier on the streaming service Disney+, which depicts the mantle of Captain America being assumed by Sam Wilson (Anthony Mackie, who first appeared as the Falcon in 2014's The Winter Soldier). Falcon and the Winter Soldier head writer Malcolm Spellman and series writer Dalan Musson were confirmed to be writing a fourth Captain America film in April 2021, which was formally announced in July 2022 with Mackie as star and Julius Onah as director. Announced under the title Captain America: New World Order, the film was retitled Captain America: Brave New World in June 2023. Filming occurred from March to June 2023, and Brave New World was released in February 2025.

=== Ensemble and supporting roles ===
Marvel conceived of a film based on the superhero team the Avengers in 2003. It was conceptualized as a crossover film featuring an ensemble cast of superheroes, including Chris Evans as Captain America, who were to be initially established in their own individual films. Casting for what would become the 2012 film The Avengers began in 2008, with filming commencing in 2011. The film was written and directed by Joss Whedon.

Three sequels to The Avengers featuring Evans as Captain America were subsequently produced: Avengers: Age of Ultron (2015), Avengers: Infinity War (2018), and Avengers: Endgame (2019). Age of Ultron was written and directed by Whedon, while the latter two films were helmed by Winter Soldier and Civil War directors Anthony and Joseph Russo, and screenwriters Christopher Markus and Stephen McFeely. Infinity War and Endgame were originally planned as a two-part film, but were later separated into two distinct films that were shot back-to-back in 2017; as this arrangement exceeded Evans' original six-picture deal with Marvel, the actor renegotiated his contract with the company to appear in Endgame. Evans additionally made cameo appearances as the character in the films Thor: The Dark World (2013), Ant-Man (2015), Spider-Man: Homecoming (2017), and Captain Marvel (2019).

Mackie and Evans are slated to appear in the forthcoming films Avengers: Doomsday (2026) and Avengers: Secret Wars (2027).

== Animation ==
Captain America has appeared in the following animated films:

- 2006 – Ultimate Avengers, voiced by Justin Gross
- 2006 – Ultimate Avengers 2: Rise of the Panther, voiced by Justin Gross
- 2008 – Next Avengers: Heroes of Tomorrow, unvoiced
- 2014 – Iron Man and Captain America: Heroes United, voiced by Roger Craig Smith
- 2015 – Marvel Super Hero Adventures: Frost Fight!, voiced by Matthew Mercer
- 2018 – Lego Marvel Super Heroes: Black Panther – Trouble in Wakanda, voiced by Roger Craig Smith
- 2018 – Marvel Rising: Secret Warriors, voiced by Roger Craig Smith
- 2023 – Lego Marvel Avengers: Code Red, voiced by Roger Craig Smith

== Personnel ==
=== Cast and characters ===
Character	Captain America	CBS films		Captain America	Marvel Cinematic Universe			
Character	Captain America	Captain America	Captain America II: Death Too Soon	Captain America	Captain America: The First Avenger	Captain America: The Winter Soldier	Captain America: Civil War	Captain America: Brave New World
Character	1944	1979	1979	1990	2011	2014	2016	2025
Captain America	Dick Purcell (as Grant Gardner)	Reb Brown (as Steve Rogers)	Reb Brown (as Steve Rogers)	Matt Salinger (as Steve Rogers)	Chris Evans (as Steve Rogers)	Chris Evans (as Steve Rogers)	Chris Evans (as Steve Rogers)	Anthony Mackie (as Sam Wilson)
Red Skull				Scott Paulin	Hugo Weaving			
Sharon Carter				Kim Gillingham		Emily VanCamp	Emily VanCamp	
Bucky Barnes / Winter Soldier					Sebastian Stan	Sebastian Stan	Sebastian Stan	Sebastian Stan
Peggy Carter					Hayley Atwell	Hayley Atwell		
Howard Stark					Dominic Cooper		John Slattery	
Arnim Zola					Toby Jones	Toby Jones		
Nick Fury					Samuel L. Jackson	Samuel L. Jackson		
Falcon						Anthony Mackie (as Sam Wilson)	Anthony Mackie (as Sam Wilson)	Danny Ramirez (as Joaquin Torres)
Natasha Romanoff / Black Widow						Scarlett Johansson	Scarlett Johansson	
Brock Rumlow / Crossbones						Frank Grillo	Frank Grillo	
Thaddeus Ross / Red Hulk							William Hurt	Harrison Ford

=== Crew ===
Occupation	Captain America	CBS films		Captain America	Marvel Cinematic Universe			
Occupation	Captain America	Captain America	Captain America II: Death Too Soon	Captain America	Captain America: The First Avenger	Captain America: The Winter Soldier	Captain America: Civil War	Captain America: Brave New World
Occupation	1944	1979	1979	1990	2011	2014	2016	2025
Director(s)	Elmer Clifton; John English	Rod Holcomb	Iván Nagy	Albert Pyun	Joe Johnston	Anthony Russo; Joe Russo	Anthony Russo; Joe Russo	Julius Onah
Producer(s)	William J. O'Sullivan	Martin Goldstein	Martin Goldstein	Menahem Golan	Kevin Feige	Kevin Feige	Kevin Feige	Kevin Feige; Nate Moore
Executive Producer(s)	Herbert J. Yates	Allan Balter	Allan Balter	Stan Lee; Joseph Calamari	Alan Fine; David Maisel; Joe Johnston; Louis D'Esposito; Nigel Gostelow; Stan Lee	Alan Fine; Louis D'Esposito; Michael Grillo; Stan Lee; Victoria Alonso	Alan Fine; Louis D'Esposito; Nate Moore; Patricia Whitcher; Stan Lee; Victoria Alonso	Louis D'Esposito; Charles Newirth; Anthony Mackie
Writer(s)	Royal K. Cole; Ronald Davidson; Basil Dickey; Jesse Duffy; Harry Fraser; Grant Nelson; Joseph Poland	Don Ingalls	Wilton Schiller	Stephen Tolkin	Christopher Markus; Stephen McFeely	Christopher Markus; Stephen McFeely	Christopher Markus; Stephen McFeely	Julius Onah; Peter Glanz; Matthew Orton; Malcolm Spellman; Dalan Musson; Rob Edwards
Composer(s)	Mort Glickman	Pete Carpenter; Mike Post	Pete Carpenter; Mike Post	Barry Goldberg	Alan Silvestri	Henry Jackman	Henry Jackman	Laura Karpman
Cinematographer(s)	John MacBurnie	Ronald W. Browne	Vincent A. Martinelli	Philip Alan Waters	Shelly Johnson	Trent Opaloch	Trent Opaloch	Kramer Morgenthau
Editor(s)	Wallace Grissell; Earl Turner	Michael S. Murphy	Michael S. Murphy	Jon Poll	Jeffrey Ford; Robert Dalva	Jeffrey Ford; Matthew Schmidt	Jeffrey Ford; Matthew Schmidt	Matthew Schmidt Madeleine Gavin

== Home media release ==
Title	Format	Release date	Ref.
Captain America (1979)	VHS	April 13, 1994	
Captain America II: Death Too Soon	VHS	April 13, 1994	
Captain America / Captain America II: Death Too Soon Double Feature	DVD	October 18, 2011	
Captain America (1990)	LaserDisc	February 9, 1992	
Captain America (1990)	VHS	June 23, 1994	
Captain America (1990)	Blu-ray	May 21, 2013	
Captain America: The First Avenger	DVD, Blu-ray, Blu-ray 3D	October 25, 2011	
Captain America: The Winter Soldier	DVD, Blu-ray, Blu-ray 3D	September 9, 2014	
Captain America: Civil War	DVD, Blu-ray, Blu-ray 3D	September 2, 2016	
Captain America: Brave New World	UHD, Blu-ray	May 13, 2025	

== Reception ==
=== Box office performance ===
Film	U.S. release date	Box office gross			Production budget	Ref.
Film	U.S. release date	North America	Other territories	Worldwide	Production budget	Ref.
Captain America: The First Avenger	July 22, 2011	$176,654,505	$193,915,269	$370,569,774	$140 million	
Captain America: The Winter Soldier	March 26, 2014	$259,766,572	$454,654,931	$714,421,503	$170 million	
Captain America: Civil War	April 27, 2016	$408,084,349	$745,253,147	$1,153,337,496	$250 million	
Captain America: Brave New World	February 14, 2025	$197,727,479	$212,289,242	$410,016,721	$180 million	
Totals		$1,042,232,905	$1,606,112,589	$2,648,345,494	$740 million	

=== Critical and public response ===
Film	Critical		Public
Film	Rotten Tomatoes	Metacritic	CinemaScore
Captain America (1990)	12% (17 reviews)	—N/a	—N/a
Captain America: The First Avenger	80% (274 reviews)	66 (43 reviews)	A−
Captain America: The Winter Soldier	90% (310 reviews)	70 (48 reviews)	A
Captain America: Civil War	90% (431 reviews)	75 (53 reviews)	A
Captain America: Brave New World	46% (366 reviews)	42 (56 reviews)	B−

== See also ==
- Captain America in other media
- Fantastic Four in film
- Punisher in film
- Spider-Man in film
- 3 Dev Adam ("Three Giant Men"), 1973 Turkish film featuring an unauthorized depiction of Captain America
