= One World, One People =

- The Falcon and the Winter Soldier episode
- The sixth of several art posters released for the series, with art by Luke Butland (Lost Mind)
- Episode no.: Episode 6
- Directed by: Kari Skogland
- Written by: Malcolm Spellman; Josef Sawyer
- Cinematography by: P.J. Dillon
- Editing by: Jeffrey Ford; Rosanne Tan
- Original release date: April 23, 2021
- Running time: 51 minutes

Cast
- Carl Lumbly as Isaiah Bradley; Amy Aquino as Christina Raynor; Desmond Chiam as Dovich; Dani Deetee as Gigi; Indya Bussey as DeeDee; Renes Rivera as Lennox; Tyler Dean Flores as Diego; Elijah Richardson as Eli Bradley; Chase River McGhee as Cass; Aaron Haynes as AJ; Ken Takemoto as Yori; Miki Ishikawa as Leah; Rebecca Lines as Atwood; Jane Rumbaua as Ayla; Salem Murphy as Lacont; Nicholas Pryor as Oeznik; Gabrielle Byndloss as Olivia Walker

Episode chronology
← Previous "Truth"	Next → —

"One World, One People" is the sixth episode and series finale of the American television miniseries The Falcon and the Winter Soldier, based on Marvel Comics featuring the characters Sam Wilson / Falcon and Bucky Barnes / Winter Soldier. It follows the pair as they fight the anti-nationalist Flag Smashers. The episode is set in the Marvel Cinematic Universe (MCU), sharing continuity with the films of the franchise. It was written by head writer Malcolm Spellman and Josef Sawyer, and directed by Kari Skogland.

Anthony Mackie and Sebastian Stan reprise their respective roles as Sam Wilson and Bucky Barnes from the film series, with Emily VanCamp, Wyatt Russell, Erin Kellyman, Julia Louis-Dreyfus, Danny Ramirez, Georges St-Pierre, Adepero Oduye, and Daniel Brühl also starring. Development began by October 2018, with Spellman hired to serve as head writer of the series. Skogland joined in May 2019. The episode sees Wilson accept the mantle of Captain America and wear a new costume, with the series' title changing to Captain America and the Winter Soldier in the end credits. Filming took place at Pinewood Atlanta Studios in Atlanta, Georgia, with location filming in the Atlanta metropolitan area and in Prague.

"One World, One People" was released on the streaming service Disney+ on April 23, 2021. Viewership was estimated to be slightly lower than the previous week, and the episode received mixed reviews. The acting, visuals, and Wilson's character arc were praised, but it was deemed to be weaker than the previous episodes and some felt it was an unsatisfying conclusion with an abrupt characterization shift for John Walker (Russell). The episode received a Primetime Creative Arts Emmy Award nomination for its sound editing.

== Plot ==
Wearing his new Captain America suit from the Wakandans, Sam Wilson flies to New York City to save the Global Repatriation Council (GRC) from the Flag Smashers' attack. He is joined by Bucky Barnes and Sharon Carter. While Wilson fights Georges Batroc, the Flag Smashers takes GRC representatives as hostages. Wilson saves some hostages from a helicopter while Barnes intercepts trucks with another group. Karli Morgenthau sets a vehicle on fire to distract Barnes and escape, but John Walker intervenes. Barnes frees the burning truck's hostages and helps Walker in battling the Flag Smashers, but is subdued. Morgenthau drives the remaining truck off a ledge, but Walker chooses to save the truck rather than chase her. Morgenthau and the remaining Flag Smashers attack him and they all fall to the ground, but Wilson arrives and saves the truck.

As the hostages are freed, Batroc arrives and drops smoke grenades, allowing the Flag Smashers to flee. Carter confronts Morgenthau and reveals that she is the Power Broker, and is angry at Morgenthau's betrayal. Batroc attempts to blackmail Carter, but she kills him. Wilson attempts to reason with Morgenthau, but she refuses to listen and fights him, before being shot by Carter when she has Wilson at gunpoint. Before dying, a tearful Morgenthau apologizes to Wilson. After the attack, Wilson convinces the GRC to postpone a vote that would force the relocation of people displaced by the Blip who Morgenthau died fighting for. He implores them to instead make efforts to help those people.

The remaining Super Soldier Serum-enhanced Flag Smashers are taken prisoner, but before they can be sent to the Raft, they are killed when their transport vehicle is bombed by Helmut Zemo's butler Oeznik. Contessa Valentina Allegra de Fontaine gives Walker a new suit and dubs him a "U.S. Agent". Wilson takes Isaiah Bradley and his grandson Eli to the Smithsonian's Captain America exhibit which now features a statue of Bradley. Barnes makes amends with his friend, Yori Nakajima, telling him that he killed his son while he was the Winter Soldier. Barnes crosses off every other name on his list of people who needed closure from him, and joins Wilson in Louisiana for a celebratory cookout.

In a mid-credits scene, Carter is pardoned by the United States government and reinstated to her former position in the CIA. She makes a phone call, informing someone that she has access to the government's secrets.

== Production ==
=== Development ===
By October 2018, Marvel Studios was developing a limited series starring Anthony Mackie's Sam Wilson / Falcon and Sebastian Stan's Bucky Barnes / Winter Soldier from the Marvel Cinematic Universe (MCU) films. Malcolm Spellman was hired as head writer of the series, which was announced as The Falcon and the Winter Soldier in April 2019. Spellman modeled the series after buddy films that deal with race, such as 48 Hrs. (1982), The Defiant Ones (1958), Lethal Weapon (1987), and Rush Hour (1998). Kari Skogland was hired to direct the miniseries a month later, and executive produced alongside Spellman and Marvel Studios' Kevin Feige, Louis D'Esposito, Victoria Alonso, and Nate Moore. The sixth episode, titled "One World, One People", was written by Spellman and Josef Sawyer.

=== Writing ===
Though the episode takes place mainly in New York City, no other heroes based in the city, such as Peter Parker / Spider-Man, appear, since any such cameo appearance would not have belonged or fit organically to the story. While many described John Walker's ending as "getting off easy", Spellman did not believe this was the case, noting how his career had been destroyed and for someone in the military, "to get anything other than an honorable discharge, that's a big deal". Executive producer Nate Moore said that the team did not choose to make Walker the main antagonist of the episode, but have him dispose of his fake shield to instead save the Global Repatriation Council (GRC) members from the Flag Smashers. He felt that while Walker wasn't a complete antagonist, he also did not earn complete redemption. As they had future plans for the character, stating that he "starts as somebody who the institutions would tell you is the best of the best. And having him come to an actual moral dark night of the soul and come out the other side a different person is actually really interesting". Co-executive producer Zoie Nagelhout discussed why Sharon Carter's identity as the Power Broker was kept from Wilson and Barnes, saying Carter's larger conflict and mission did not involve them so "it wasn't necessary to have to complicate her relationship with" them. Nagelhout and the writers believed it was more interesting for Carter to continue to have that duality.

Spellman worked with Mackie on the speech Wilson gives to the GRC members, with Mackie suggesting Wilson talk to one member instead of the television cameras so it was less about giving a speech and more about trying to convince one person. Spellman said that "blood, sweat and tears" went into the creation of the scene. The team wanted to show a human moment as well as the superpower of the new Captain America, which "as a Black man, [Wilson] is forged in an identity that is rooted around struggle". The mission statement was for Wilson to acknowledge the new reality of what it meant to be the new Captain America without sugar-coating it. Spellman said nothing was cut from the speech and that the moment was always planned, no matter how much they adjusted the series. He also noted that Wilson's establishment of Isaiah Bradley's Smithsonian honor was "everything he had to pull", as he felt that Bradley would never receive proper reparations and that it was not feasible "in any universe". Spellman enjoyed the line in which Bradley told Wilson that he's no "Malcolm, Mandela, or Martin", and credited it to the writers' room consisting of Black people. Ultimately, he knew that Wilson could not contest Bradley's notion. When discussing Barnes's character journey and his acknowledgement of Wilson's initial hesitance to accept his role as Captain America due to his identity as a Black man, Spellman ultimately wanted the scene to demonstrate Barnes's ability to discuss it "matter-of-factly to Sam because he's never been mentally present in an era long enough to feel like he might be complicit in some of what Sam's struggled against". Following initial plans to debut Wilson's Captain America costume in "Truth", the creative team instead opted to first feature it while he was saving GRC members on the ground and then flying into the building. However, since that was also deemed as being implausible, they decided to simply introduce it in the building.

Speaking about the mid-credits scene, Spellman said that from it, the audience would know "exactly what doors just got opened to an expanded universe", with VanCamp noting Carter "has a much bigger plan and it's not for the greater good like it used to be". Skogland tried moving the scene to different parts of the episode, but returned to keeping it as the mid-credits scene to cement the reveal of Carter as the Power Broker. Since Carter now "lives in a middle ground that is really compelling", Nagelhout hoped there would be further opportunities to continue to explore the character and "what shades of gray she might drift between".

=== Title change ===
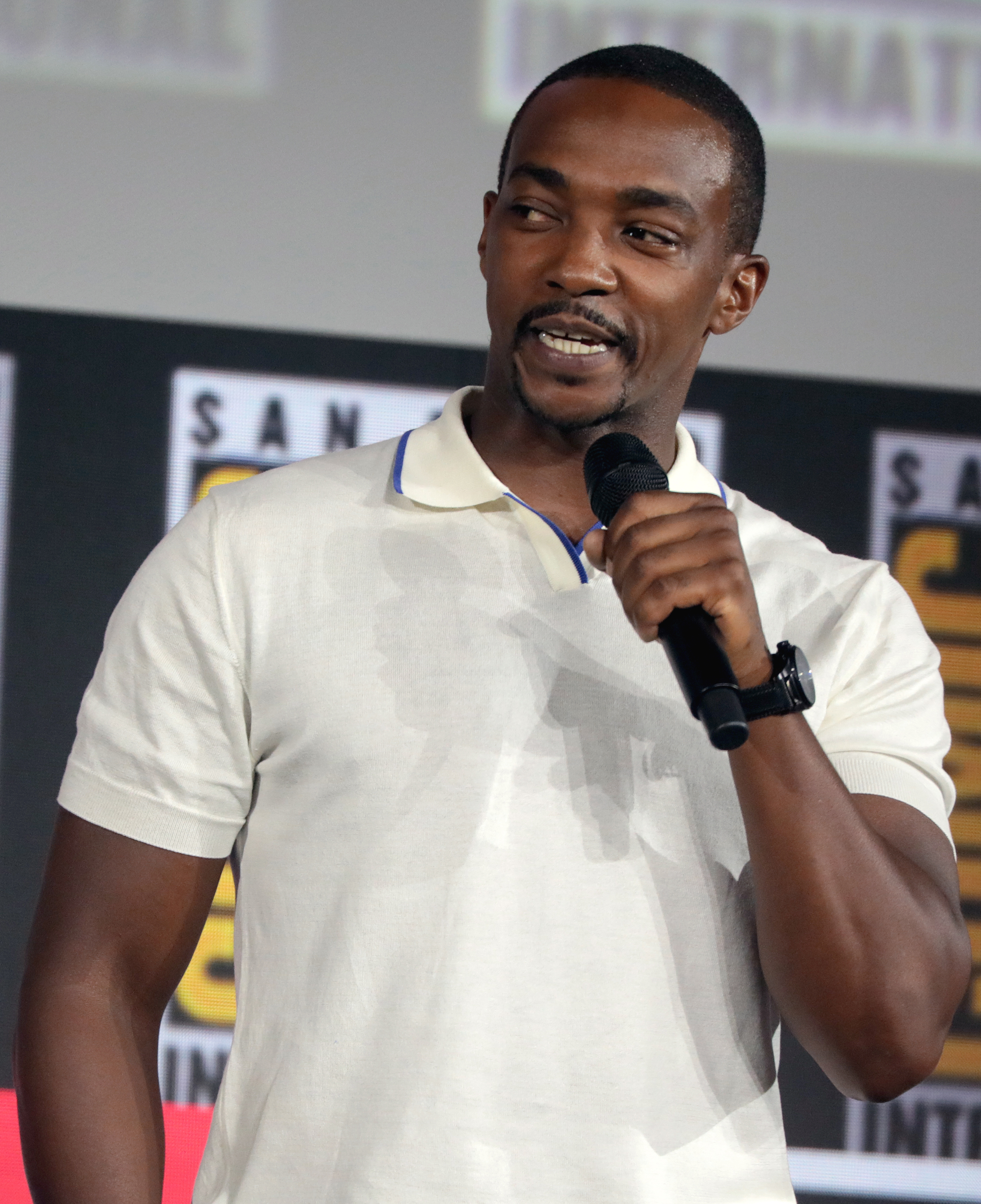
Star Anthony Mackie's Sam Wilson takes on the mantle of Captain America in the episode, and the series' title is displayed as Captain America and the Winter Soldier during the end credits.

The end of the episode changes the series' title to Captain America and the Winter Soldier. Skogland noted there was "a lot of conversation" in regards to changing the title, such as where it would be placed in the episode, its subtlety, and its design; she believed Feige had suggested it appear at the end of the episode. Though "Winter Soldier" is retained in the new title, Spellman believed Barnes had "slayed that dragon", and had "shed the burden of the Winter Soldier". Arguing that the character found a family with the Wilsons, and felt what it was like to be a hero for the first time, believing Barnes was "now free to become something amazing". Spellman hoped the audience would disregard how the title card appeared "as being an indicator of a commitment from Marvel". A version of the title was made to say "Captain America and the White Wolf" to reflect Barnes' character development in the series, but Spellman believed Marvel wanted to retain some of the original title. He argued that if both names were altered it would not have had the intended emotional impact that he was hoping for, as it would have been too detached from the original.

=== Casting ===
The episode stars Anthony Mackie as Sam Wilson / Captain America, Sebastian Stan as Bucky Barnes / Winter Soldier, Emily VanCamp as Sharon Carter / Power Broker, Wyatt Russell as John Walker / U.S. Agent, Erin Kellyman as Karli Morgenthau, Julia Louis-Dreyfus as Valentina Allegra de Fontaine, Danny Ramirez as Joaquin Torres, Georges St-Pierre as Georges Batroc, Adepero Oduye as Sarah Wilson, and Daniel Brühl as Helmut Zemo. Also appearing are Carl Lumbly as Isaiah Bradley, Amy Aquino as Christina Raynor, Desmond Chiam as Dovich, Dani Deetee as Gigi, Indya Bussey as DeeDee, Renes Rivera as Lennox, Tyler Dean Flores as Diego, Elijah Richardson as Eli Bradley, Chase River McGhee as Cass, Aaron Haynes as AJ, Ken Takemoto as Yori, Miki Ishikawa as Leah, Rebecca Lines as Atwood, Jane Rumbaua as Ayla, Salem Murphy as Lacont, Nicholas Pryor as Oeznik, and Gabrielle Byndloss as Olivia Walker.

=== Design ===
The Captain America exhibit features original props from previous MCU films that were brought out of storage. The floating light displays were inspired by modern fashion shows and repurposed light boxes from the series' Madripoor sets. The sculpture of Isaiah Bradley was created for the series. Wilson's entrance as Captain America included white lights as costume designer Michael Crow stated that it added "a level of hope and light" to the ending of the series.

=== Filming ===
Filming for the series officially began in November 2019, taking place at Pinewood Atlanta Studios in Atlanta, Georgia, with Skogland directing, and P.J. Dillon serving as cinematographer. Location filming took place in the Atlanta metropolitan area and in Prague. The series was shot like a film, with Skogland and Dillon filming all of the content at once based on available locations. Production was halted due to the COVID-19 pandemic in March 2020, and was scheduled to resume that August. Less than 30 percent of the episode was filmed before the production shutdown. Because of the pandemic, Dillon was unable to return to the production after the shut down and did not serve as cinematographer for much of the episode. Skogland had originally intended to have Spellman make a cameo appearance as the citizen who says "That's Black Falcon!" when Wilson appears as Captain America to the public. The scene where de Fontaine anoints Walker as U.S. Agent was filmed in the same location from the previous episode where the government removed Walker as Captain America. Skogland thought there was irony in doing so, since his new future began where he lost his previous one. The last scene of the episode, in which Wilson and Barnes stand together at the docks, was filmed during the first day of production, with Mackie calling it a "beautiful camaraderie to start the show".

=== Visual effects ===
Visual effects for the episode were created by Sony Pictures Imageworks, Weta Digital, Digital Frontier FX, QPPE, Stereo D, Cantina Creative, Technicolor VFX, Trixter, Crafty Apes, and Tippett Studio. When creating the helicopter action sequence, the team initially used aerial plate footage filmed in New York, but decided to create a completely digital environment as the scene grew more complex and infeasibility of filming it practically. The building that Wilson's Captain America first appears contained red lighting due to its emergency status, which altered the appearance of the suit. As reshooting it was impractical at the time, the VFX team fixed this issue by creating a small landing space for Wilson that featured white light. They also decided to include additional shots of him throwing his shield to recreate a comic book cover-shot, as the team felt it made the entrance "look as good as possible". Visual effects were also applied to his cowl, as the practical design had bends and folds due to its design and application on Mackie's face, making it appear integrated into the overall costume, with production VFX supervisor Eric Leven citing the comic books as inspiration. Imageworks worked on refining the suit during scenes on the ground, using paint or rotoscoping to blend the digital suit onto Mackie's face.

For creating the digital New York environment, Imageworks used satellite imagery and modern street maps as reference. They then used SPI to create a proprietary system, which used data from their model library to replicate over four New York boroughs, with various buildings and skylines being accurately replicated and integrated into the digital environment. Additional refinements were done by inserting elements of flora, set dressings, bridges, detailed and realistic rendering of environments, and modelling local watercraft traffic across the scenes. While creating the construction site rescue portion of the scene, the team used photogrammetry and LIDAR scanning of film sets to digitally create the street level and construction pits. According to Imageworks VFX supervisor Chris Waegner, the pit's depth was manipulated across various shots to convey a "heightened sense of danger and help facilitate the stunts".

=== Music ===
Selections from composer Henry Jackman's score for the episode were included in the series' Vol. 2 soundtrack album, which was released digitally by Marvel Music and Hollywood Records on April 30, 2021.

== Marketing ==
On March 19, 2021, Marvel announced a series of posters that were created by various artists to correspond with the episodes of the series. The posters were released weekly ahead of each episode, with the sixth poster, designed by Luke Butland (Lost Mind), being revealed on April 19. After the episode's release, Marvel announced merchandise inspired by the episode as part of its weekly "Marvel Must Haves" promotion for each episode of the series, including apparel, accessories and along with various figurines, toys, Funko Pops, costumes, and a themed Monopoly set, all focusing on Wilson as Captain America and updated designs for Barnes and Walker.

== Release ==
"One World, One People" was released on Disney+ on April 23, 2021. The episode, along with the rest of The Falcon and the Winter Soldier, was released on Ultra HD Blu-ray and Blu-ray on April 30, 2024.

== Reception ==
=== Viewership ===
Nielsen Media Research, which records streaming viewership on some U.S. television screens, reported that The Falcon and the Winter Soldier was watched for 796 million minutes between April 19–25, making it the most-streamed original series that week. Analytics company Samba TV, which gathers viewership data from certain smart TVs and content providers, announced that the series finale was watched by approximately 1.7 million U.S. households during its first five days.

=== Critical response ===
"One World, One People" received mixed reactions from critics. The review aggregator website Rotten Tomatoes reported a 72% approval rating with an average score of 6.8/10 based on 29 reviews. The site's critical consensus reads, "While "One World, One People" delivers a fitting ending for Sam, its rush to wrap The Falcon and The Winter Soldier's many threads may leave some fans wanting—and wondering if there will be a second season to help make amends." Many critics described the episode as feeling "scrambled" and "messy".

Rolling Stone's Alan Sepinwall felt that the series "crashes and burns" with "One World, One People", stating, "It's a mess in nearly every way, with even the parts that work feeling rushed and unearned, carried largely by the performers rather than the storytelling". He felt that the action sequences were hard to follow, given the way they were edited and the dark settings many were in. Sepinwall described it as "a particular bummer" and "a visual muddle" since Wilson's debut as Captain America should have been "a triumphant moment that showcases how good Sam is in the role". He criticized Wilson's costume as "goofy", despite its faithfulness to the comics, and was disappointed in the various antagonists of the series, feeling that the writers never fully realized Morgenthau's motivations, and disappointed that Walker reverted to being a hero again after being set up in the previous episode as a "compelling" secondary antagonist. He believed that much of the episode was about setting up future content in the MCU rather than "serving this show's story", in a similar way to the final episode of WandaVision.

Like Sepinwall, Christian Holub of Entertainment Weekly took issue with Walker's portrayal in the episode, saying his banter with Barnes after trying to kill each other last episode proved that the series "didn't really know what to do with any of its characters". The "most insufferable part of this episode" was Wilson's "wannabe Aaron Sorkin lecture" that had "a weird racial element" to it, since it continued the storytelling trend of the series to explain things rather than showing. Holub believed this was one of the reasons the Flag Smashers did not connect with the audience since their motivations were based on "monotonous exposition and dialogue that just stated facts rather than showing us story". Though Holub did enjoy the fact that Wilson's suit was an exact replica from the comics and felt it was enjoyable to see him fly while wielding the shield, he ultimately was left "disappointed" and "feeling kind of hollow" by the end of the series, giving the episode a "C".

Writing for IGN, Matt Purslow gave "One World, One People" a 5 out of 10, believing the episode "struggle[d] under the weight of the many threads" the series had to conclude, resulting in a rushed and unsatisfying finale. Purslow criticized the pacing of the episodes, and felt that the action at times got in the way of more deserving plot elements such as greater exploration of Morgenthau and Walker, who both had "underwhelming parts to play" in the finale. Purslow also felt that Carter's reveal as the Power Broker and Zemo's final attack on the Flag Smashers from prison were both unearned. One of the stronger elements of the episode for Purslow was Wilson becoming Captain America, particularly his speech to the GRC which was Wilson's "shining moment", and felt that Wilson establishing the Isaiah Bradley tribute was "a fantastic final statement" for the series' discussion of race. Writing for The Hollywood Reporter, Richard Newby felt Wilson's speech to the GRC was "beautifully worded", with the speech "hearken[ing] back to Sam's comic book origins as the son of a preacher who knew a thing or two about powerful words". Newby also felt that Isaiah Bradley's statue was relevant "considering the statues of Confederate soldiers and colonizers that still stand in America", and that "we have become so inundated with images of Black Americans being beaten down on our screens" that to see Wilson triumph was "almost an alien feeling".

Noel Murray said in The New York Times that the audience would have been pleased with the finale if they came to the series each week "to see big-budget super-heroics" but would have been disappointed if looking for character moments. Murray believed Barnes had "the cleanest and most heartening" story of all the major characters, while it was "harder to know what to make of the endings" for Zemo, Morgenthau, and Carter, calling it "an odd choice to center on Sharon at the end" since it made "the show's entire thematic and narrative focus feel misdirected". Sulagna Misra at The A.V. Club enjoyed Wilson's speech and that Wilson is "a normal person, and he knows how much normal people can do", but took issue with Morgenthau's characterization. Misra entered the episode with low expectations since she felt like the series "was doing a lot and didn't seem to know how to hold it together, while also taking its time for a show that only has 6 episodes". Though far from perfect, the episode reminded Misra of the fun she had seeing Captain America: The Winter Soldier in theaters, with Misra giving "One World, One People" a "B+".

=== Accolades ===
At the 73rd Primetime Creative Arts Emmy Awards, Matthew Wood, Bonnie Wild, James Spencer, Richard Quinn, Steve Slanec, Kimberly Patrick, Teresa Eckton, Frank Rinella, Devon Kelley, Larry Oatfield, Anele Onyekwere, Dan Pinder, Ronni Brown, and Andrea Gard were nominated for Outstanding Sound Editing for a Comedy or Drama Series (One-Hour) for their work on the episode.
