= Sharon Carter (Marvel Cinematic Universe) =

Character in the Marvel Cinematic Universe

- Marvel Cinematic Universe character
- VanCamp as Sharon Carter in The Falcon and the Winter Soldier (2021)
- First appearance: Captain America: The Winter Soldier (2014)
- Based on: Sharon Carter by: Stan Lee; Jack Kirby; Dick Ayers
- Adapted by: Christopher Markus; Stephen McFeely
- Portrayed by: Emily VanCamp

In-universe information
- Aliases: Agent 13; Power Broker
- Species: Human
- Affiliation: Central Intelligence Agency; S.H.I.E.L.D.
- Relatives: Peggy Carter (great-aunt); Michael Carter (grandfather)
- Nationality: American

Sharon Carter is a fictional character portrayed by Emily VanCamp in the Marvel Cinematic Universe (MCU) media franchise based on the Marvel Comics character of the same name. Carter is portrayed as the great-niece of S.H.I.E.L.D. founder Peggy Carter.

Following in the footsteps of her great-aunt, Carter joins S.H.I.E.L.D. as an agent, eventually working under the codename Agent 13. Under the orders of Nick Fury, Carter is assigned to watch over Steve Rogers as an undercover nurse, and assists him with taking down S.H.I.E.L.D. which had been infiltrated by the terrorist organization Hydra. Carter later joins the CIA but goes into hiding after assisting Rogers in the Avengers Civil War. After surviving the Blip, Carter establishes herself as the Power Broker in Madripoor, ruling the city's criminal underworld.

VanCamp appeared as Carter in the films Captain America: The Winter Soldier (2014) and Captain America: Civil War (2016), and the Disney+ television miniseries The Falcon and the Winter Soldier (2021). She also voiced alternate versions of the character in the Disney+ animated series What If...? (2021–2024). Reaction to Carter was generally positive while her transition to Power Broker received mixed responses.

== Concept and casting ==
In February 2013, Canadian actress Emily VanCamp entered negotiations to join the cast of Captain America: The Winter Soldier as the female lead. On her casting, in an interview with Nylon magazine, the Russo brothers noted that they "wanted someone that [Steve] would have an immediate interest in". They added that the character also "had to be a strong-willed person" noting VanCamp's work on Revenge.

Some critics voiced opinions about "how thin and slight she seems in photos and on Revenge" but the brothers defended her saying that, "She's obviously very credible with physicality, she holds the screen really well, and she even looks like the character from the comics".

== Characterization and appearances ==
The character first appeared in Captain America: The Winter Soldier (2014) which was released theatrically on April 4, 2014. Her full name or family history was not revealed in the film due to the character being undercover as Agent 13, a nurse with the alias Kate, protecting Steve Rogers. On her character, VanCamp noted that in the film they're "introducing her" and "when we first see her, we realize she's living next to Captain America [...] they sort of have a little thing going on and as we all know in the comic books they had a love affair off and on for years. They had a very complicated relationship. It's almost as if they are planting the seeds now. Sort of leaving room to go wherever they want to go with it".

VanCamp reprised her role in Captain America: Civil War (2016). During the film, Carter, now working with the Central Intelligence Agency (CIA) after the fall of S.H.I.E.L.D., (Note: As depicted in Captain America: The Winter Soldier.) becomes a fugitive after assisting Rogers with defying the Sokovia Accords. Carter and Rogers share a kiss, which received some controversy. VanCamp noted that while "there are die-hard fans that want to see [Rogers] with different people", she hoped fans would be happy with the outcome. While Carter did not fight with 'Team Cap' at the Leipzig/Halle Airport during the Avengers Civil War, early concept art of the film placed Carter fighting alongside the Avengers, eventually seemingly being replaced by Wanda Maximoff who was not present in any of the early art. Despite this, VanCamp teased her expanded role, noting that her character "is definitely Team Captain America" and that she "got to do a small fight sequence with Scarlett Johansson". Additionally in Civil War, Carter reveals herself to be the great-niece of S.H.I.E.L.D. founder Peggy Carter. Until then, the MCU had not officially established that the character was Sharon Carter. Her relationship to Peggy was originally set to be explored in the cancelled third season of ABC's Agent Carter where Peggy's long thought to be deceased brother, Michael Carter (Sharon Carter's grandfather; portrayed by Max Brown in the show's second season), would have made an appearance as a villain. Between 2014 and 2016, VanCamp was also set to reprise her role in ABC's Agents of S.H.I.E.L.D. but was unable to do so due to scheduling conflicts with her role on Revenge.

It's hard to fit Sharon into that. She's really in Cap's world [...] I can't say anything about anything, but I will say that you know she sort of fits into the Captain America movies and that's where her story lies.

— Emily VanCamp on Sharon Carter's absence in Avengers: Infinity War and Avengers: Endgame

In 2016, two new Avengers films were announced to arrive in 2018 and 2019 (eventually being titled Avengers: Infinity War and Avengers: Endgame) but Carter was not present in either, despite the film being a union of "the majority of the shared universe's biggest characters". Writers Christopher Markus and Stephen McFeely noted that Carter initially appeared in early drafts of their script showing her and Rogers "trying to make it work in an apartment". Kevin Feige ultimately stepped in and scrapped the idea, with Screen Rant writer Ana Dumaraog attributing Carter's removal to Rogers's ending with Peggy.

VanCamp reprised her role in the Disney+ miniseries The Falcon and the Winter Soldier (2021). At the start of the series, Carter is in a "pretty dark place", and VanCamp noted that she was interested to explore new sides of Carter such as her anger, adding Carter had "a bit more edge" and a "chip on her shoulder". In the series, Carter is revealed to be the Power Broker, and had "resorted to a life of crime when she had no other options available", after the events of Civil War where she was branded a terrorist for helping Rogers. TheWrap writer Phil Owen noted that while heroes such as Bucky Barnes were pardoned for their crimes, Carter was not, which he felt was "ridiculous on multiple levels" and that it "tarnishes Steve's legacy even further". In the series finale's mid-credits scene, Carter was revealed to have turned full supervillain, contacting potential buyers about selling government secrets from her new position. Though the series does not explain much of what Carter went through since she was last seen, co-executive producer Zoie Nagelhout noted that the character had a story arc offscreen. Executive producer and writer Malcolm Spellman stated the writers chose not to "be fake" by simply saying she had been in hiding, but rather, since she previously had "a very youthful quality to her", Carter was able to "[grow] up" because of being scorned by the intelligence community. On her new role as a supervillain, VanCamp felt it solidified the character, adding that "the sacrifices [Carter] made weren't always worth it in her mind".

In 2021 and 2024, VanCamp voiced two alternate versions of Carter in two respective What If...? episodes, "What If... Zombies?!", and "What If... the Emergence Destroyed the Earth?". The former episode saw Carter as one of the last surviving heroes of a zombie apocalypse, and eventually turns into a zombie herself before being killed by Hope van Dyne. The latter episode saw Carter in another apocalyptic environment, having survived the Emergence and becomes the Power Broker. In the episode, Carter betrays Riri Williams to Quentin Beck's Iron Federation. Comic Book Resources writer Joshua Patton felt the episode developed Carter's character in the MCU by steering her more toward a villainous direction.

== Differences from the comics ==
Throughout the mainstream Marvel Comics, Sharon Carter was originally introduced as the younger sister of Peggy Carter in Tales of Suspense No. 75 (1966) written by Stan Lee, drawn by Jack Kirby and Dick Ayers. She was later retconned into being Peggy's great-niece for continuity purposes. In the comics, Captain America has a relationship with Carter "that has survived break-ups, dimensional divides, and even death and resurrection". Contrastingly to the Marvel Cinematic Universe (MCU), Captain America travelled back in time to be with Carter's aunt, Peggy. Despite this difference, in both the comics and the MCU, Carter was inspired by Peggy and is a S.H.I.E.L.D. agent.

One of the biggest differences from the comics is that in the MCU, Carter becomes the supervillain known as the Power Broker. In the mainstream comics, the Power Broker is a man named Curtiss Jackson who trades securities and assets and hires a scientist named Dr. Karl Malus to give super-strength for his clients. Two of these clients include U.S. Agent / John Walker and Battlestar / Lemar Hoskins. Jackson was known for being dishonest with his clients by subjecting them to medical procedures they did not sign up for and giving them hardcore addictive substances to cause them to keep "coming back to him and paying for treatments". This story was adapted to the MCU showing Carter supplying a doctor named Wilfred Nagel with resources to recreate the Super Soldier Serum.

Additionally, during the Civil War comic storyline, Carter was as supporter of the Superhuman Registration Act which causes strain on her and Rogers' relationship; in the MCU, Carter is an avid member of 'Team Cap', helping him fight against the Sokovia Accords.

== Fictional character biography ==
=== Early life ===
Sharon Carter was born in New Orleans, Louisiana, and was the great-niece of Peggy Carter and granddaughter of Michael Carter. Growing up, Carter admired her great-aunt, Peggy, who helped found the intelligence agency S.H.I.E.L.D. Peggy bought Carter her first thigh holster and despite protests from her mother, Carter joined the agency. While working at S.H.I.E.L.D., Carter did not tell anyone about her relation to Peggy due to feeling that she could not live up to her great-aunt's legacy.

=== Fall of S.H.I.E.L.D. ===
Sometime in 2014, Carter is assigned by the director of S.H.I.E.L.D., Nick Fury, to monitor and protect Steve Rogers in his apartment in Washington D.C.. She uses the alias Kate to observe Rogers, report back to Fury and ensure that Rogers is stable after being found in the ice a few years prior. After Rogers is declared a fugitive by S.H.I.E.L.D. secretary Alexander Pierce, Carter goes to work in the Triskelion, reluctantly agreeing to help hunt him down. When Rogers exposes Hydra's plot with Project Insight, Carter watches as another agent is threatened by Brock Rumlow to launch the project. She reacts by pulling a gun on him, affirming herself to Rogers, but is defeated by Rumlow. After S.H.I.E.L.D. is dismantled, Carter joins the CIA .

=== Assisting Steve Rogers ===
In 2016, Carter attends her great-aunt Peggy's funeral and gives a moving eulogy where she reveals her family heritage for the first time. Rogers and Carter reunite after the funeral and are notified by Sam Wilson about the news of a bombing that occurred at the signing of the Sokovia Accords. Carter leaves for work and updates Rogers about the search for Bucky Barnes noting that there is an order to shoot him on sight. She and Everett K. Ross meet with Rogers, Wilson, and T'Challa after they are brought to the Joint Counter Terrorist Centre after being arrested.

After a brainwashed Barnes breaks out of his cell with the help of his acting therapist, Helmut Zemo, Carter engages in a fight with him alongside Natasha Romanoff and Tony Stark. Barnes overpowers all three and consequently escapes with the help of Rogers and Wilson. Carter retrieves Rogers' shield and Wilson's wingsuit, subsequently betraying the government, and gives them in secret to Rogers, sharing a kiss with him. She then proceeds to go on the run.

=== Becoming the Power Broker ===
In 2018, Carter survives the Blip despite initially believed to have been a victim. Over the next eight years, Carter moves to Madripoor, becomes a black market art dealer, and then the Power Broker, Madripoor's criminal underworld secretive ruler. After the Blip, she learns about Wilfred Nagel's work on replicating the Super Soldier Serum and provides him with the resources to synthesize the serum. Additionally, Carter takes in teenage Karli Morgenthau, who betrays her and steals twenty vials of the serum, using one on herself and much of the rest on members of her anti-nationalist terrorist group, the Flag Smashers. Carter vows to track and kill her.

==== Aiding Wilson and Barnes ====
In 2024, Carter witnesses Wilson, Barnes and Zemo arrive in Madripoor and helps them escape bounty hunters that come after them. Carter tries to kill Zemo, but Wilson tells her they need his help. She takes them to her art gallery and uses her connections to help the three get to Nagel who is then killed by Zemo. After a fight breaks out between the four and other bounty hunters, Carter decides to stay behind in Madripoor but Wilson agrees to obtain a pardon for her so she can return to the United States. Later on, Carter uses her resources to help Wilson and Barnes track down John Walker. Carter also releases Georges Batroc from an Algerian prison to track down and spy on Morgenthau.

After being asked for help by Wilson, Carter travels to New York City to help him and Barnes save the Global Repatriation Council (GRC) from the Flag Smashers' attack. In the hustle of the attack, Carter separates Morgenthau from the others and confronts her. Batroc overhears them and attempts to blackmail Carter, who kills him. Morgenthau shoots Carter, then prepares to shoot Wilson, the new Captain America. The wounded Carter shoots and kills Morgenthau to protect her identity as the Power Broker. Carter watches Wilson make a public speech and is later taken by Barnes to receive medical help. Carter is consequently pardoned, reinstated to her former position in the CIA, and calls an unknown person to line up buyers for government secrets.

== Alternate versions ==
Multiple alternate versions of Carter appear in the animated series What If...?, with VanCamp reprising her role.

=== Zombie outbreak ===
In an alternate 2018, Carter is among the survivors of a Quantum virus outbreak which turned most of Earth's population into zombies. She, alongside Hope van Dyne, Peter Parker, Bucky Barnes, Okoye, Bruce Banner, Kurt, and Happy Hogan, leave their base in New York City and travel to Camp Lehigh where a cure is said to be in development. Carter is soon ambushed and infected by a zombified Steve Rogers. Resurfacing as a zombie herself, Carter is blown up by Van Dyne, but not before she infects her.

=== Emergence ===
In an alternate universe, the Earth is split apart by the Emergence. Carter survives the Emergence and assumes her role as the Power Broker, a black market technology dealer. She meets with Riri Williams who is need of a magnetron, an essential part of a project she is working on to defeat Quentin Beck, the fascist leader of the Earth's remains. Carter gives her an Easy-Bake Oven, but then betrays Williams by handing her over to Beck's Iron Federation, only to be knocked out by Williams afterward.

== Reception ==
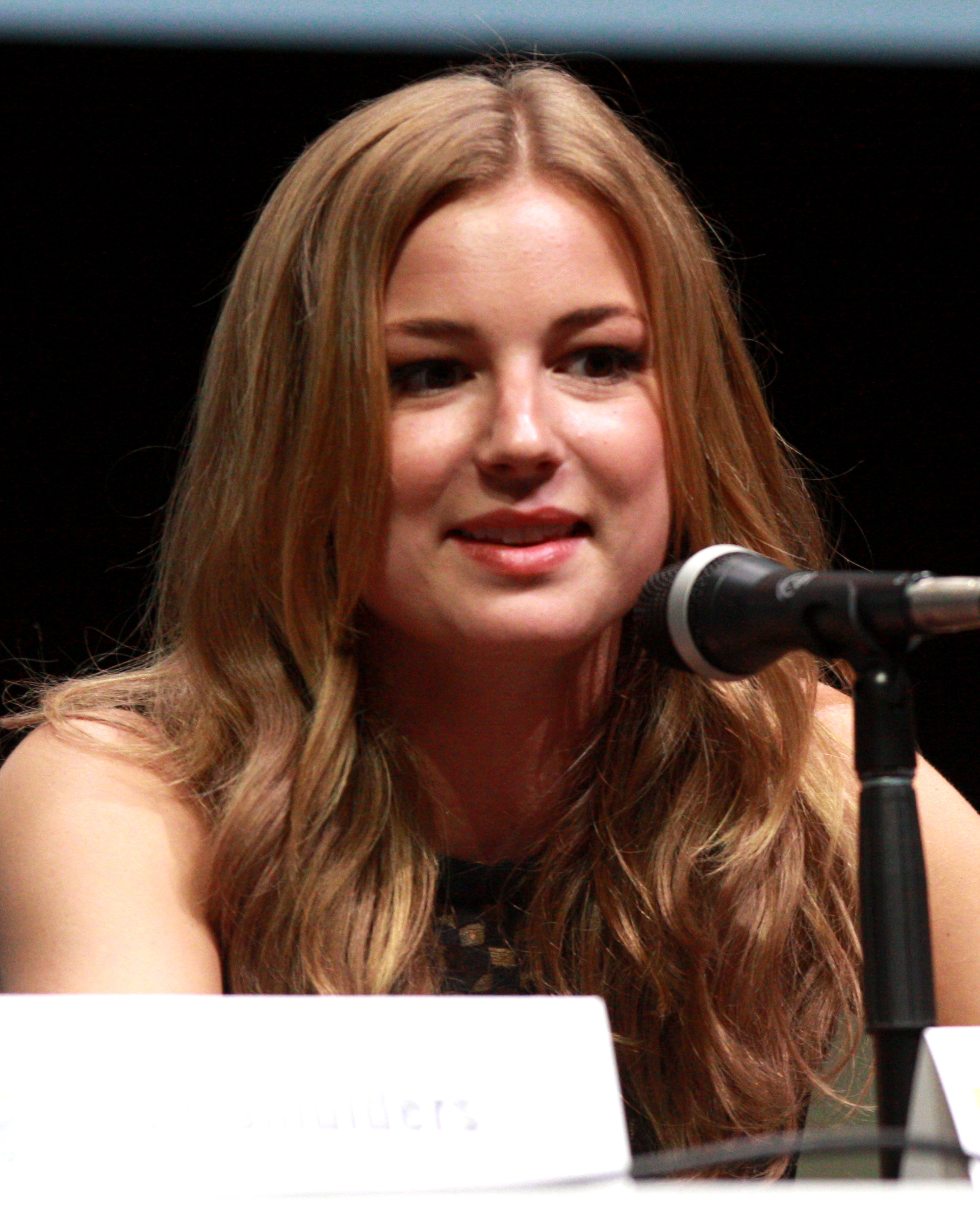
VanCamp at the 2013 San Diego Comic-Con during a press conference for Captain America: The Winter Soldier

=== Critical response ===
VanCamp's role as Sharon Carter has received praise with TheThings writer Anthony Spencer noting that she had "great presence in the MCU" before seemingly disappearing from the franchise. Carter's reveal as the Power Broker received generally mixed reviews with many praising VanCamp's acting transition from Carter into the Power Broker but some deeming it confusing to the character's storyline, and calling it "predictable and unsatisfying".

Rolling Stone writer praised VanCamp's acting ability in The Falcon and the Winter Soldier, noting that she "does well with the bigger showcase and with playing a much more cynical Sharon than the one who flirted with Steve in the movies". Deadline writer Anthony D'Alessandro also praised VanCamp's acting but noted that the reveal did not make much sense; however, he received the cliffhanger post-credits scene with praise, calling it "intriguing". Screen Rant writer Kai Young called Carter's transition to Power Broker one of Phase Four's most controversial stories. Similarly to D'Alessandro, he noted the transition made no sense as "Carter had always been depicted as a steadfast hero with a strong moral compass". Young also called it "insulting" to the Carter family legacy.

Comic Book Resources writer Timothy Donohoo wrote that Carter's change into the "villainous Power Broker" was "poorly" written. He felt that the "development came out of nowhere" and that "audiences didn't receive a true reason for her motives". Conversely, Mediaversity Reviews writer Malcolm Spellman felt that Carter was "reborn" on the show "as a character with grit and independence". In a retrospective review of her character, Bam! Smack! Pow! writer Ashley Wijangco felt that Carter has been wasted in the MCU, saying that after Marvel opted against following through with Carter being Steve Rogers' love interest, she has strayed from her comic counterpart. Wijangco opined that the MCU not following up on her shift into the Power Broker was a "waste of her character and narrative".

=== Accolades ===
Year	Work	Award	Category	Result	Ref(s)
2016	Captain America: Civil War	Teen Choice Awards	Choice Movie Liplock (with Chris Evans)	Nominated	
