= Dalan Musson =

American screenwriter

- Years active: 2007–present
- Notable work: Iron Sky: The Coming Race; The Falcon and the Winter Soldier; Captain America: Brave New World

Dalan Musson is an American screenwriter and actor best known for his work on Iron Sky: The Coming Race (2019), The Falcon and the Winter Soldier (2021), and Captain America: Brave New World (2025).

== Career ==
Though he had been working in the games industry since 1996, the first big title in his writing career was Iron Phoenix, released in 2005. He wrote the script for the video game The Golden Compass, released in 2007. In 2009, he served as a consultant writer on the documentary film See What I'm Saying: The Deaf Entertainers Documentary. In 2010, Musson had a “Script Adaptation” for Front Mission Evolved. In November 2012, he was hired to write the screenplay for Jeremiah Harm and he wrote the promotional short film for the upcoming film with Timo Vuorensola. In 2014, he signed on to script the fantasy film Iron Sky: The Coming Race. In 2021, he wrote an episode for the Marvel Cinematic Universe series The Falcon and the Winter Soldier, titled "Truth", alongside series creator Malcolm Spellman. He gained notability by co-writing, with Spellman, the MCU film Captain America: Brave New World (2025).

== Writing credits ==
Video game

Year	Title	Role	Ref.
2005	Iron Phoenix	Additional script writer	
2007	The Golden Compass	Main writer	
2010	Front Mission Evolved	Script adaptation	

Documentary film

Year	Title	Role	Ref.
2009	See What I'm Saying: The Deaf Entertainers Documentary	Consultant writer	

Short film

- Jeremiah Harm Promo (2012)

Feature film

Year	Title	Notes
2019	Iron Sky: The Coming Race	Also actor (Uncredited)
2025	Captain America: Brave New World	
2026	Street Fighter	

Television

Year	Title	Note	Ref.
2021	The Falcon and the Winter Soldier	Episode "Truth"	
