= Len Birman =

Canadian-American actor (1932–2023)

Leonard Birman (died February 10, 2023) was a Canadian-American actor, who began his career in Montreal. In his 45 years on stage, screen and radio, he portrayed a wide variety of characters, including some choice roles in classical and contemporary theatre.

== Early life and career ==
Birman was born in Montreal, Quebec, Canada, the second son of Maurice Lieb Birman, who was a millinery designer, and Anna Birman, a marriage that lasted 70 years. He graduated from Baron Byng High School in 1949 as class president, and within months he was captivated by the stage and the discovery of being naturally at home on it. He had been a good student and now had no interest at all in continuing on to college.

His earliest influences came by way of the STAGE series, the Canadian Broadcasting Corporation's radio productions of original plays and international classics beginning in the early 1940s. As a longtime fan, he was honoured and humbled to be joining the remaining members of the troupe when he moved to Toronto in 1962. He soon became a mainstay, playing dozens of pivotal roles.

Coincidental with his first appearances in community theatre (1955), CBC/Radio Canada announced plans for their first live English and French television series to be produced in Montreal. Called Dateline on the English-language channel and Je Me Souviens on the French-language channel, it aired on alternate Friday nights with the same cast. His audition won him his first TV role.

Birman's film experience began almost simultaneously with the arrival of The National Film Board of Canada to new headquarters and studios in Montreal. That, together with CBC's new television activity, presented the possibility of acting as a vocation. Until then, radio drama was the only ongoing paid professional work, and Birman was to be married in September 1956.

By that time, Birman, together with George Bloomfield, director, and M. Charles Cohen, playwright, created Domino Productions, a stage ensemble for which Birman produced, played leading roles and exercised his innate talent for art by designing the sets, posters and programs. As a youngster, he had thought he would study art in Paris but his inclination toward theatre proved more persuasive. He had already contributed skits to various annual Variety shows, including McGill University's Red And White Revue, YMHA′s Variety Gang and B'nai B'rith's Notes To You. Birman spearheaded the founding of Café André's Up Tempo, a highly successful satirical revue, which was the first of its kind in Canada and ran well into the 1960s.

Busy with Domino, he also made TV appearances in minor roles on CBC's Dorchester Theatre, Explorations, Théâtre Populaire, Shoestring Theatre, Les Plouffes, A Midsummer Theatre, and in 44 episodes of CBC's first filmed series, The Adventures of Radisson, which was known as Tomahawk on American television. At this time (1955–57), he appeared in three films for the NFB's Perspective series, and performed his first leading role in a teleplay called Etc..., which grew out of Domino and was written by Cohen and directed by Bloomfield for Guest Stage.

In 1957, Domino's rehearsal schedule of A View From The Bridge came to a sudden end when it was learned that the American touring company of the same play, starring Luther Adler, was due for a limited run at Her Majesty's Theatre and that casting of the minor roles would be done locally. Birman was cast as Mike and later in the tour played Rodolpho, the role he was earlier slated to play with Domino.

The following year, he rejoined the company of A View From The Bridge for the pre-Broadway tour of what was to be the first presentation of the extended version of Arthur Miller's one-act play. It closed in Washington. That summer Birman went off to Nantucket to play the role of Macbeth.

Later that year he was invited to join New York's Institute for Advanced Study In Theatre Arts under the tutelage of Jacques Charron of Comédie Française, Paris, Yuri Zavadsky of Moscow Art Theatre, and Willie Schmidt of Schiller Theatre, Berlin.

On television in New York (1958-1963), he appeared on Armstrong Circle Theatre, Robert Herridge Theatre, All Family Classics, Dupont Show of the Month, Hallmark Hall of Fame, Actors TV Theatre, The Witness. Among these were roles in Cyrano de Bergerac, The Three Musketeers, The Scarlet Pimpernel, and The Prisoner of Zenda. Birman's first U.S. screen credit was for a role on Naked City.

Birman has also instructed advanced acting students and coached professional actors. He served as guest lecturer and/or instructor at the National Theatre School of Canada, Manitoba School of Theatre and Allied Arts, The Okanagan Summer Arts Festival and The Hub of Hollywood.

== Film and television ==
Birman was best known for his roles in feature films, including Harry Herman, the father in Lies My Father Told Me (1975), which was the Golden Globe winner for Best Foreign Film (1976), Papa in The Great Brain (1977), and FBI Chief Donaldson in Silver Streak.

His first appearances before the film camera were for the National Film Board of Canada's Perspective Series in The Editor, First Novel, and Lafontaine (1956,1957). He appeared as himself in 30 Minutes Mr. Plummer (1963), for which he wrote and voiced the narrations in French and English.

From 1955 to 1975, Birman appeared in dozens of shows for CBC television on Folio, Guest Stage, Eyeopener, Seaway, Forest Rangers, A Midsummer Theatre, On Camera, GM Theatre, Festival, Encounter, Rainbow Country, The Collaborators, CBC Television Theatre, Festival Concert Series, Shoestring Theatre, Teleplay, and Quest.

Many of his roles were in original plays as well as familiar ones such as Eilif in Mother Courage, Brutus in Julius Caesar, Eilert Lovborg in Hedda Gabler, Charles Bentham in Juno and the Paycock, Grace in The Brig, Victor in Yerma, Nick in For Want of Something Better To Do, Lord Mountararat in Iolanthe, Kourchaev in Diary of a Scoundrel, King John in King John and the Magna Carta, The Man in Last To Go,The Applicant, Gladly Otherwise, Brother Ladvenu in The Lark, Valentine in Twelfth Night.

== Voice acting ==
In the 1980s, Birman was heard on U.S. radio drama, as many and varied characters on Mutual Radio Theatre and Sears Radio Theatre. In the 1960s and 1970s Canadian radio listeners heard him on CBC Stage, Drama In Sound, Wednesday Night, The Bush and the Salon, Midweek Theatre, Maigret (series), Schools Broadcasts, Anthology and Foothill Fables. Some of the well known and recognizable parts he played were:

- Armand in Camille
- Joseph K in The Trial
- Antony in Julius Caesar
- George in Of Mice and Men
- King Philip in Juana La Loca
- Petruchio in Taming of the Shrew
- Thorwold Helmer in A Doll's House
- Apolladorus in Caesar and Cleopatra
- Alan Quartermain in King Solomon's Mines

Birman dubbed foreign films, was voice over on TV and radio commercial spots, and narrated school programs and documentaries. He shared narration of the "CTV Network" series The Fabulous Sixties with Peter Jennings, and voiced guest villains on the TV cartoon series Spiderman, Iron Man, Captain America and The Incredible Hulk. He was also the voice of Hercules and Giant Man/AntMan (The Marvel Super Heroes) (1966). In his own series, he played Rocket Robin Hood (1966–1967).

== Personal life and death ==
Birman married twice. His first marriage was to Jayne Taft (1956–1963). They had one son, Matthew, who is enjoying a career as an actor/director/stunt co-ordinator. His second marriage was to Ruby Renaut (1977–2020). She had left acting in favor of work behind the camera, and they met on set. They were married at City Hall during the one hour lunch break from rehearsal for Hedda Gabler. Renaut retired as the leading script supervisor with credits on all major television series and feature films produced in Canada, including the landmark The Fox (1967). For 40 years Hollywood Hills was their home.

Birman died at his home in California on February 10, 2023, at the age of 90.

== Theatre credits (1955–1995) ==
- Anne of a Thousand Days – Thomas Cromwell
- Ring Around The Moon – Messerschmann
- Picnic - Hal Carter, his first professional role. Birman was paid $20.
- Craig's Wife - Eugene
- Arsenic and Old Lace - Officer Klein
- Another Part of the Forest - Ben Hubbard
- A View From The Bridge - Mike / Rodolpho
- Bullfight - Domingo Salamanca
- The Three Sisters - Vershinin
- Macbeth - Macbeth
- Love and Intrigue - Worm
- Compulsion - Dr. McNarry
- Death of a Salesman - Howard Wagner / Biff
- Do You Know The Milky Way? -The Man
- (1962-1964): Member of the company of the Stratford Shakespeare Festival Theatre, Ontario, including appearance at Chichester Festival Theatre, England (then under Laurence Olivier)
- The Tempest - Adrian
- Macbeth - Caithness/Macbeth
- Cyrano de Bergerac - Understudy Cyrano/Actor/ First Cadet/
- Troilus and Cressida - Prologue / Diomedes
- Timon of Athens - A Painter
- Richard Second - Duke of Aumerle
- King Lear - Duke of Burgundy / A Gentleman
- A Streetcar Named Desire - Stanley Kowalski
- A Yard of Sun - Roberto Bruno
- Romeo and Juliet - Mercutio
- The Sound of Music - Captain Georg Von Trapp
- The Dybbuk - Rabbi Ezrielka
- Wild Rose - Moses Lefthand
- Tartuffe - Cleante
- Sarcophagus - Doctor Sergeyev
- Bitter Friends - Schaeffer
- A Shadow of Cypress - The Man
- Heloise and Abelard, The Letters - Abelard
- My Fair Lady - Professor Henry Higgins

== Filmography ==
- Naked City (1962, TV Series) as Dr. Clyde (uncredited)
- The Forest Rangers (1963-1965, TV Series) as John Connequeese / Benton / Amik
- Seaway (1965, TV Series) as Woody Threerivers
- Heloise and Abelard (1965) as Theo
- Judd, for the Defense (1967, TV Series) as Lloyd Wasson
- It Takes a Thief (1968, TV Series) as Prince Cesare di Montefiore
- Cowboy in Africa (1968, TV Series) as Dr. Lawson
- Adventures in Rainbow Country (1969, TV Series) as Clements
- Great Jury Trials (1970) as Lawrence Darr
- Dr. Simon Locke (also known as Police Surgeon) (1971-1972, TV Series) as Lt Dan Palmer
- This Is the Life (1972, TV Series) as Latimer
- Turncoat (1973, TV Movie) as Leo
- She Cried Murder (1973, TV Movie) as Marvin
- Mannix (1974, TV Series) as Michael Truman
- Lies My Father Told Me (1975) as Harry Herman
- Silver Streak (1976) as Chief Donaldson
- Most Wanted (1976, TV Series) as Gil Slade
- Serpico (1977, TV Series) as Gene Rincon
- The Streets of San Francisco (1977, TV Series) as David Bradley, US Marshal
- The Rhinemann Exchange (1977, TV Mini-Series) as Asher Feld
- The Man Inside (1977, TV Movie) as Paint
- Young Dan'l Boone (1977, TV Series) as Duval
- Killer on Board (1977, TV Movie) as Marvin Luck
- Logan's Run (1977, TV Series) as Positive 14 / Brawn
- The Six Million Dollar Man (1978, TV Series) as Chilton Kane
- Escapade (1978, TV Movie) as Arnold Tolliver
- The Great Brain (1978) as Papa Fitzgerald
- Evening in Byzantium (1978, TV Mini-Series) as Leonardo
- The Paper Chase (1978, TV Series) as Prof. Dudley Rolfe
- Sword of Justice (1978, TV Series) as Nicholi
- Captain America (1979, TV Movie) as Dr. Simon Mills
- A Man Called Sloane (1979, TV Series) as Forbes
- Captain America II: Death Too Soon (1979, TV Movie) as Dr. Simon Mills
- B. J. and the Bear (1980-1981, TV Series) as Leonard Marker / Harry Tyser
- Buck Rogers in the 25th Century (1981, TV Series) as Admiral Zite
- Knots Landing (1981, TV Series) as Salmaggio
- Nero Wolfe (1981, TV Series) as Neil Stryker
- Dallas (1981, TV Series) as Claude Brown
- Titans (1981, TV Series) as Nostradamus
- Draw (1983, TV Movie) as Ephraim
- Passions (1984, TV Movie) as Sam Cooper
- Airwolf (1984, TV Series) as Kenneth Langhom
- A Matter of Justice (1984, TV Movie) as Ralph Blair
- The Undergrads (1985, TV Movie) as Verne Adler
- Picking Up the Pieces (1985, TV Movie) as Carew
- Assassin (1985, TV Movie) as Senator Corbin
- This is the Life (1985, TV Series) as Paul Montgomery
- Airwolf ll (1986, TV Series) as Jaggerman
- Generations (1989-1990, TV Series) as Eddie
- Without Her Consent (1990, TV Movie) as Judge Wasserman
- Sweating Bullets (1991, TV Series) as Simon Chase
- Days of Our Lives (1992, TV Series) as Judge Bartlett
- E.N.G. (1993, TV Series) as Mac Brady (final appearance)
