= Captain America (1979 film) =

1979 American TV movie

- DVD cover
- Genre: Superhero
- Based on: Captain America by: Joe Simon; Jack Kirby
- Written by: Don Ingalls
- Directed by: Rod Holcomb
- Starring: Reb Brown
- Theme music composer: Pete Carpenter; Mike Post
- Country of origin: United States
- Original language: English

Production
- Executive producer: Allan Balter
- Producer: Martin M. Goldstein
- Cinematography: Ronald W. Browne
- Editor: Michael S. Murphy
- Running time: 97 minutes
- Production company: Universal Television
- Budget: $150,000

Original release
- Network: CBS
- Release: January 19, 1979

Related
- Captain America II: Death Too Soon

Captain America is a 1979 American made-for-television superhero film loosely based on the Marvel Comics character of the same name, directed by Rod Holcomb and starring Reb Brown. The film was followed by Captain America II: Death Too Soon, released the same year.

Although not widely seen, it influenced the comic books in a few ways, such as Steve Rogers's choice of vehicles and his skill in penciling illustration.

== Plot ==
Steve Rogers (Reb Brown) is a former Marine whose late father was a government agent in the 1940s. His father's patriotic attitude earned him the nickname "Captain America".

Rogers, now making a living as an artist and traveling the countryside in a conversion van, is inspired by his father's story to sketch a superhero. He is critically injured from an attempt on his life.

He is administered an experimental serum called the FLAG formula, an acronym for "Full Latent Ability Gain" — a kind of "super-steroid" — which Rogers' father had developed from his own glands. The formula saves his life and enhances his strength and reflexes. These new abilities inspire Dr. Simon Mills (Len Birman), the research biochemist and intelligence official behind FLAG, to recruit Steve and give him a costume based on his drawing.

It is revealed that the villain intends to destroy a community with a neutron bomb. When Captain America stops the truck transporting it and diverts an exhaust into the trailer to subdue any guards inside, he finds out that the villain was inside wearing a deadman's switch detonator to the bomb measuring his heartbeat and is seriously affected by carbon monoxide poisoning. Captain America and Dr. Mills have to apply emergency first aid and are successful in keeping the villain alive so that the detonator can be safely removed.

Rogers decides to become the same Captain America his father had been, donning a uniform identical to the one his father had worn: the "classic" Captain America uniform.

== Cast ==
- Reb Brown as Steve Rogers / Captain America
- Len Birman as Dr. Simon Mills
- Heather Menzies as Dr. Wendy Day
- Robin Mattson as Tina Hayden
- Joseph Ruskin as Rudy Sandrini
- Lance LeGault as Harley
- Frank Marth as Agent Charles Barber
- Steve Forrest as Lou Brackett
- Chip Johnson as Jerry
- James Ingersoll as Lester Wiant
- Jim B. Smith as F.B.I. Assistant
- Jason Wingreen as Surgeon
- June Dayton as Secretary
- Diana Webster as Nurse
- Dan Barton as Jeff Hayden

== Production ==
In 1978, Universal under the direction of executive Frank Price obtained the rights to the Marvel Comics characters Namor the Sub-Mariner, The Human Torch, Hulk, Captain America, and Doctor Strange to develop the properties as potential television projects. Among these, The Human Torch was scrapped due to internal concerns that younger viewers would attempt to mimic the character through self-immolation and Namor the Sub-Mariner was scrapped due to perceived similarities to Man from Atlantis. As for the remaining projects, The Incredible Hulk managed to become an ongoing series, Doctor Strange would appear in the television film Dr. Strange, and Captain America would serve as the basis for the 1979 television films Captain America and Captain America II: Death Too Soon.

The motorcycle Captain America uses in the movie was a Yamaha XT 500 designed by Reb Brown's stunt double Gary Davis which was fitted with fiberglass and wheel covers to give it a suitable look for the character.

== Release ==
The film premiered on CBS in the United States on January 19, 1979. The film was released on home video on April 20, 1994.

The film was released theatrically in Colombia in 1981.

== Reception ==
The movie received a mixed reception from critics.

In a 2023, director Rod Holcomb reflected on his experience directing Captain America stating:

It was devastating, people wanted to fire me, I never, I shot it for the studio, I shot it for the network, I shot it for my friend who gave me the job. I never once shot any one frame for myself. Never one frame for myself.

Ultimately, CBS didn't fire Holcomb, and he continued to have a lengthy career as a television director.

== Adaptation of elements in other media ==
The elements of the TV movies were slightly emulated in the Captain America comic book series.

In issue #237, Rogers establishes himself as a commercial artist. Although his professional career has waxed and waned in its depiction, it is permanently established in later works like The Adventures of Captain America that Rogers was a Fine Arts student specializing in illustration in the 1930s, working in the Works Progress Administration's Federal Arts Project before he was recruited into Project Rebirth.

In issue #259, a young man that Captain America redeemed from associating with a criminal gang built a custom high-performance motorcycle in gratitude, which became a signature vehicle of the character for years. Apart from having considerable speed, the design is standard apart from its American Flag paint motif.

In issue #318, Rogers receives a specially customized conversion van courtesy of King T'Challa of Wakanda, aka The Black Panther. The van has special communications equipment, an extendable periscope, a sleeping bunk when Rogers is travelling, a special frame so Rogers can launch from the van while riding his motorcycle, and has a special paint that can instantly change colors when Rogers desires it for stealth purposes.
