= Iron Phoenix =

2005 video game

- Developer: InterServ
- Publisher: Sega
- Platform: Xbox
- Release: NA: March 24, 2005
- Genre: Fighting
- Modes: Single-player, multiplayer

Iron Phoenix is a 2005 fighting video game developed by Interserv and published by Sega for the Xbox. The game was released on March 24, 2005 only in North America.

== Plot ==
Iron Phoenix is centered around the tale of nine magic weapons carved long ago from a meteorite called the Iron Phoenix.

== Gameplay ==
The fighting system is based on the weapon and character selection, allowing hundreds of unique move combinations. Iron Phoenix supported up to 16 players online on Xbox Live. There are various game modes such as: Deathmatch, Team Deathmatch, Giants, VIP and Ring Challenge.

== Development and release ==
Iron Phoenix was developed by Interserv, a Taiwanese company who had previously developed several MMO titles in Asia. It was produced by Sammy Studios, who merged with Sega midway through development in October 2004. Producer Tim Hess stated that development drew from an "extensive library of martial arts moves" recorded in motion capture from martial artists in Taipei.

The game was designed primarily for multiplayer gameplay on Xbox Live, and the developers integrated features from the recent Live 3.0 update, including the creation of clans, and tournaments.

Iron Phoenix was announced by Sammy in March 2004. Publisher Sammy Studios showcased the game in their booth at E3 in May 2004.

Two arenas were available as downloadable content via Xbox Live for free

The game was rated in October 2004 by the German rating system USK, though no German release materialized.

A very similar game named Meteor Blade was in development at the time by Interserv, but this games Xbox version was cancelled. It released in 2007 on PC instead.

== Reception ==
Reception

Aggregate score
Aggregator	Score
Metacritic	58/100

Review scores
Publication	Score
GameSpot	4.1/10
GameSpy	2.5/5
IGN	6.6/10

Iron Phoenix has received "mixed or average" reviews, according to review aggregator Metacritic, with an average score of 58/100.
