= Captain America II: Death Too Soon =

1979 superhero television film

- DVD cover
- Genre: Action; Superhero
- Based on: Captain America by: Joe Simon; Jack Kirby
- Written by: Wilton Schiller
- Directed by: Ivan Nagy
- Starring: Reb Brown; Connie Sellecca; Len Birman; Christopher Lee; Katherine Justice; Christopher Cary; Bill Lucking; Stanley Kamel; Ken Swofford; Lana Wood
- Theme music composer: Pete Carpenter; Mike Post
- Country of origin: United States
- Original language: English

Production
- Executive producer: Allan Balter
- Producer: Martin M. Goldstein
- Cinematography: Vincent A. Martinelli
- Editor: Michael S. Murphy
- Running time: 88 minutes
- Production company: Universal Television

Original release
- Network: CBS
- Release: November 23, 1979

Captain America II: Death Too Soon is a 1979 American made-for-television superhero film based on the Marvel Comics character Captain America, directed by Ivan Nagy and starring Reb Brown. The film was preceded by Captain America earlier the same year. It was aired on CBS in two one-hour slots. The first part aired on November 23, 1979, and the second aired the next night, leading into the conclusion of Salem's Lot.

== Plot ==
Steve Rogers (Reb Brown) is first shown sketching a portrait of Mrs. Shaw (Susan French), who complains to him about a gang of muggers who have been stealing the proceeds from cashed Social Security checks; she denies having cashed hers. He bids her to do this in order to set a trap for the muggers and springs the trap as Captain America.

In the meantime, a freelance revolutionary terrorist calling himself General Miguel (Christopher Lee), planning to fight an unspecified war, kidnaps Professor Ian Ilson (Christopher Cary) and forces him to resume his research in manipulative gerontology. Ilson has managed to formulate both a chemical that accelerates aging and the antidote to the same chemical, and Miguel, posing as the warden of a prison in Oregon near Portland, plans to use the chemicals in question to hold Portland hostage for a multimillion-dollar ransom.

Ultimately, Rogers and Miguel directly clash face-to-face, and when Miguel throws a glass bottle of the aging accelerant into the air, hoping it will shatter against Captain America's body, the Captain throws his shield to stop the attack, where it shatters the bottle in such a manner that the aging accelerant splashes them both. However, the Captain only receives a minor amount and thus only ages a month. Miguel, on the other hand, ages to death in less than a minute.

== Cast ==
- Reb Brown as Steve Rogers / Captain America
- Christopher Lee as General Miguel
- Connie Sellecca as Dr. Wendy Day
- Len Birman as Dr. Simon Mills
- Katherine Justice as Helen Moore
- Christopher Cary as Professor Ian Ilson
- William Lucking as Stader
- Stanley Kamel as Kramer
- Ken Swofford as Everett Bliss
- Lana Wood as Yolanda
- Susan French as Mrs. Shaw

== Release ==
The film was released on home video on April 20, 1994.

The film was released theatrically in France in 1980 and had a special film festival screening in Finland in 2014.

== Cancelled TV series ==
Both Captain America and Captain America II: Death Too Soon were intended as pilots for an ongoing Captain America TV series, but Universal Television lost the rights not long after the movies were produced and the licensing fees had increased to $50,000 per episode in comparison to The Incredible Hulk having licensing fees of only $2,500 per episode.
