= Sam Wilson (Marvel Cinematic Universe) =

Character in the Marvel Cinematic Universe

- Marvel Cinematic Universe character
- Anthony Mackie as Sam Wilson / Captain America in The Falcon and the Winter Soldier episode "One World, One People" (2021)
- First appearance: Captain America: The Winter Soldier (2014)
- Based on: Falcon by: Stan Lee; Gene Colan
- Adapted by: Christopher Markus; Stephen McFeely
- Portrayed by: Anthony Mackie

In-universe information
- Aliases: Captain America; Falcon
- Occupation: Avenger; Trauma counselor; U.S. Air Force Pararescueman
- Affiliation: Avengers; United States Air Force; United States Department of Veterans Affairs
- Weapon: Captain America's shield; Custom vibranium flight suit; EXO-7 Falcon flight suit; "Redwing" drone; Various firearms
- Family: Paul Wilson (father); Darlene Wilson (mother); Sarah Wilson (sister)
- Relatives: AJ Wilson (nephew); Cass Wilson (nephew)
- Origin: Delacroix, Louisiana, United States
- Nationality: American

Samuel Thomas Wilson is a fictional character portrayed by Anthony Mackie in the Marvel Cinematic Universe (MCU) media franchise, based on the Marvel Comics character of the same name and known commonly by his original alias, the Falcon, and later as Captain America. Wilson is initially depicted as a veteran United States Air Force Pararescueman who specializes in the use of an advanced jet pack with articulated wings. A skilled combatant and tactician, Wilson becomes a close friend of Steve Rogers after helping him during the Hydra uprising, and is later recruited by him to join the Avengers.

During the fallout related to the Sokovia Accords, Wilson sides with Rogers and becomes a fugitive. He returns to the fold during the conflict against Thanos, falling victim to the Blip. After being restored to life, he is appointed by the now-retired Rogers to become the new Captain America, and is given a specially made version of the iconic shield. Believing he cannot live up to the mantle, Wilson surrenders the shield to the U.S. government, which appoints John Walker as Captain America. During the ensuing conflict with Walker and the Flag Smashers, Wilson, with assistance from Bucky Barnes, finally accepts the title and passes on his own mantle as Falcon to Joaquin Torres. As Captain America, Wilson comes into conflict with Thaddeus Ross, who is being manipulated by Dr. Samuel Sterns. After stopping Sterns and saving Ross, Wilson begins to reassemble the Avengers.

Wilson is a central figure in the MCU, having appeared in seven films as of 2025. He is a primary protagonist of the miniseries The Falcon and the Winter Soldier (2021). The character is the first black Captain America in the MCU, and Mackie's portrayal of Wilson has been met with positive reception. He starred as the titular character in the film Captain America: Brave New World (2025).

== Fictional character biography ==
=== Early life and military service ===
Wilson was born and raised in Delacroix, Louisiana, where his family operated a fishing business. He later became a United States Air Force (USAF) Pararescueman and served multiple tours in overseas military campaigns. He was selected to test a prototype military wingsuit alongside his friend Riley due to insurgents' use of RPGs preventing the use of helicopters. However, Riley was killed by an RPG and Wilson was unable to save him. After ending his Air Force service, Wilson became a trauma counselor aiding other returning veterans.

=== Helping Steve Rogers and becoming an Avenger ===
In 2014, Wilson befriends Steve Rogers while jogging in Washington, D.C., and later agrees to help him and Natasha Romanoff defeat Hydra. After receiving help from Maria Hill and Nick Fury, the trio travel to S.H.I.E.L.D.'s headquarters, the Triskelion, where they engage Bucky Barnes, who Hydra brainwashed and turned into the Winter Soldier, and Brock Rumlow. In the aftermath, Wilson offers to accompany Rogers in his mission to track down Barnes.

In 2015, Wilson attends the Avengers' party at Avengers Tower in New York City and reports back on his progress in finding Barnes to Rogers. Soon after, Wilson is recruited into the Avengers' new roster at the Avengers Compound alongside Wanda Maximoff, Vision, and James Rhodes.

A few months later, Wilson has a brief altercation with Scott Lang outside the Compound, where Lang takes a device necessary for his own mission. Wilson, impressed by Lang, starts looking for him as a possible recruit.

=== Sokovia Accords ===
In 2016, Wilson accompanies Rogers, Romanoff, and Maximoff on a mission in Lagos to stop Rumlow from obtaining a biological weapon. While there, Wilson debuts a bird-shaped robotic drone he has nicknamed Redwing. Later, at the Compound, he becomes the first Avenger to oppose the Sokovia Accords, a new law requiring the Avengers to be supervised by the United Nations that Rogers also opposes but Tony Stark supports. Wilson accompanies Rogers and attends Peggy Carter's funeral. Afterwards, he learns that Barnes is being framed for a bombing in Vienna and informs Rogers and Sharon Carter. Rogers and Wilson attempt to protect Barnes, only to be arrested alongside the Black Panther, T'Challa. When the true perpetrator of the bombing, Helmut Zemo, sets Barnes loose to protect his own escape, Wilson attempts to catch Zemo but is unsuccessful. Later, Barnes tells Rogers and Wilson about five other supersoldiers that he believes Zemo wants to unleash. At Wilson's suggestion, Rogers calls Clint Barton to recruit Lang and retrieve Maximoff. At an airport in Germany, they face off against Stark's faction of Avengers - Rhodes, Romanoff, T'Challa, Spider-Man, and Vision. As Rogers and Barnes escape in a Quinjet, Wilson, Barton, Maximoff, and Lang are captured and incarcerated at the Raft prison, where they are met by Stark, who convinces Wilson to tell him where Rogers and Barnes went in exchange for Stark going alone. Sometime later, Wilson, Barton, Lang, and Maximoff are broken out of the Raft by Rogers.

=== Infinity War and resurrection ===
In 2018, Wilson, Rogers, and Romanoff, who have been in hiding as fugitives, arrive in Scotland to rescue Maximoff and Vision from Proxima Midnight and Corvus Glaive, two of the Children of Thanos. Wilson pilots their Quinjet back to the Compound where they meet with Rhodes and Bruce Banner, before heading to Wakanda to get Vision help. They face off in a battle against the Outriders on the Wakandan fields. After the battle is over, they try to stop Thanos upon his arrival from completing the Infinity Gauntlet, but are unable to, and Wilson falls victim to the Blip.

In 2023, Wilson is restored to life and is brought via portal by Masters of the Mystic Arts to the ruins of the Compound to join the battle against an alternate version of Thanos. He alerted Cap to his presence through a speaker saying "On your left," a quote that Steve himself used when outrunning him during their initial meeting in Washington. A week later, Wilson attends Stark's funeral. The next day, with Barnes' approval, he receives Captain America's shield and mantle from an elderly Rogers.

=== Becoming Captain America ===
==== Air Force work with Torres ====
In 2024, Wilson has returned to work as a contractor with the USAF with support from his close friend, USAF first lieutenant Joaquin Torres. He and Torres go on a mission to rescue a captive USAF captain from Georges Batroc in Tunisia. Wilson returns to Washington, D.C. and gives the shield to the U.S. government so it can be displayed in a Smithsonian exhibit dedicated to Captain America, believing that he is not worthy of taking up Captain America's mantle. While there, he reunites with Rhodes. He then returns to Delacroix to help his sister, Sarah, with the family business until Torres tells of him an attack carried out by the Flag Smashers, a terrorist group that believe life was better during the Blip. Wilson also learns that the U.S. government has named John Walker the new Captain America.

==== Partnering with Bucky Barnes ====
Wilson returns to the USAF base to meet with Torres, but he is approached by Barnes, who expresses disapproval that he surrendered the shield. Wilson and Barnes are taken to Munich by Torres to intercept the Flag Smashers and their leader Karli Morgenthau, only to discover they all have superhuman strength. Despite receiving aid from Walker and Lemar Hoskins, Wilson and Barnes are overpowered and the terrorists escape. Walker requests the pair join him in aiding the Global Repatriation Council (GRC) to quash the ongoing violent post-Blip revolutions, but they decline and head to Baltimore to meet Isaiah Bradley, a Korean War veteran and super-soldier whom Barnes encountered in battle decades prior, to find out how the Flag Smashers obtained super-soldier serum. They approach Bradley's house and meet his grandson, Elijah Bradley, while Bradley refuses to help them, revealing he was imprisoned and experimented on by the government for thirty years. Barnes convinces Wilson to travel to Berlin and meet with the imprisoned Zemo in an effort to obtain information about the Flag Smashers, during which Barnes secretly orchestrates Zemo's escape. Despite his reluctance, Wilson joins Barnes and Zemo in traveling to Madripoor under assumed names to locate the source of the new super-soldier serum. They learn from high-ranking criminal, Selby, that the Power Broker hired former Hydra scientist Dr. Wilfred Nagel to recreate the serum before the trio is compromised and Selby is killed. The trio are saved by Carter, who agrees to help them after Wilson offers to get her pardoned. They travel to Nagel's lab and confront him, learning that he created twenty vials of the serum before the Flag Smashers stole them. After Zemo kills Nagel and bounty hunters destroy the latter's lab, Wilson, Barnes, and Carter fight the bounty hunters until Zemo acquires a getaway car to help them escape. While Carter stays behind, Wilson calls Torres for intel and tells Barnes and Zemo they need to travel to Latvia to find Morgenthau.

==== Stopping the Flag Smashers ====
Wilson attempts to persuade Morgenthau to end the violence, but an impatient unstable Walker interrupts and she escapes. After she threatens Sarah, Wilson meets with Morgenthau, during which she asks him to join her movement. Walker and Hoskins intervene, leading to a fight in which Morgenthau accidentally kills Hoskins. Enraged by his friend's death and having taken the serum, Walker uses Captain America's shield to kill one of the Flag Smashers in front of a group of horrified bystanders, who film his actions.

Following this, Wilson and Barnes demand the shield from Walker, starting a fight in which Walker rips off Wilson's suit wings before Wilson and Barnes narrowly take the shield back. He and Barnes meet with Torres at a GRC refugee camp where Wilson realizes he needs to be Captain America and passes on his Falcon suit and mantle over to Torres. He then revisits Isaiah, but the latter states his belief that a black man cannot, and should not, be Captain America. Wilson returns home to Louisiana and helps fix the family boat, with assistance from several locals as well as Barnes, who delivers a new Captain America suit he acquired from the Wakandans. While training with the shield, Wilson and Barnes agree to work together as friends.

After receiving a lead from Torres, Wilson flies to New York City in his new Captain America suit to save the GRC from the Flag Smashers with help from Barnes, Carter, and Walker. Wilson attempts to reason with Morgenthau one more time but failed, so Carter kills her when she points a gun at him. After carrying out Morgenthau's body, Wilson convinces the GRC to postpone their impending vote to force the relocation of Blip-displaced individuals and make efforts to help them instead. Wilson then visits the Bradley's again, having convinced the government to create a statue honoring Bradley as part of the Smithsonian's Captain America exhibit. He then takes them to see it. Afterward, Wilson returns home and joins his family, Barnes, and his community for a cookout.

=== Conflict with the Leader and restarting the Avengers ===
In 2026, Wilson is at Abe's Bar in Baltimore and watches the television as it broadcasts a rally for Ross, who has become the next President of the United States.

In 2027, Wilson and Torres successfully intercept an illegal sale of adamantium (Note: Discovered on the body of the Celestial Tiamut as depicted in Eternals (2021).) in Mexico. Wilson takes Torres to Baltimore and introduces him to Bradley at a gym. At the same time, Wilson receives a call from Ross inviting him and Torres to the White House. He works out a deal where he can bring along Bradley.

At the White House, Wilson is told by Ross of his plan to reform the Avengers and asks him to work with him, as well as picking the new Captain America as the face of the adamantium treaty. While addressing the international leaders, Bradley and four other men attack Ross. Wilson chases after Bradley but watches as he is arrested, before going back to the White House bunker and is told by Ross not to investigate what happened. Wilson meets with Bradley at the prison and after leaving is attacked by Sidewinder, managing to take his phone. He returns to his and Torres' base and they track the phone's last call to a hidden site in West Virginia.

They arrive at Camp Echo One and discover that Samuel Sterns used mind control on Bradley and the other four men to attack the president, after Ross reneges his promise to release Sterns. Sterns uses his mind control on the military agents there to attack Wilson and Torres. Agent Ruth Bat-Seraph's investigation also leads her to the site.

After the trio escape from the laboratory, Wilson and Torres are taken into custody by the FBI, but break free with Bat-Seraph after the agents become mind-controlled also. They go to Norfolk, Virginia to meet Wilson's friend who he gives a box of pills too to investigate and speaks to a captured Sidewinder. They quickly learn that Ross is on a ship in the Indian Ocean and he and Torres fly out to meet him.

At Celestial Island, Wilson and Torres stop two mind-controlled American pilots from attacking the Japanese fleet to prevent igniting a war between Japan and the U.S. Although successful, Torres is seriously injured. Wilson goes back to Walter Reed Hospital to watch Torres in the treatment room. He is met by Barnes, who provides some words of comfort.

After he leaves, Wilson leaves to get air outside and is met by Sterns, who turns himself in. Before being arrested, Sterns exposes Ross to the public via a live broadcast, causing the president to transform into the Red Hulk. Wilson arrives to stop him from destroying the White House and lures Ross to the cherry blossom field in Washington in an attempt to use the president's memories with his daughter Betty Ross to stop his rampage. A brutal battle ensues between the two, in which Wilson manages to narrowly evade some of Ross's attacks and cause minor damage, but eventually is caught and has one of his vibranium wings ripped from him. Using the kinetic energy stored in his remaining wing, Wilson severely impales Ross and causes an explosion that temporarily knocks both unconscious. An injured Wilson then reasons with Ross, allowing the president to revert to his normal self.

Following the incident, Bradley is exonerated while Ross has himself incarcerated at the Raft, where Wilson and Betty pay him a visit. Wilson goes back to Walter Reed and checks on a recovering Torres, acknowledging him as Falcon and learning how much he meant to him. Wilson tells Torres that he decided to restart and lead the Avengers. He makes Torres an official member and first recruit to the new team, while also discussing getting him a new Falcon suit.

Sometime later, Wilson visits Sterns, also incarcerated at the Raft, and is told about the multiverse and is warned of an incoming attack from other universes.

In 2028, Wilson disagrees with Barnes over the New Avengers. He files for copyright, suing them for the name of their team as he and Torres are already active as the Avengers. (Note: As mentioned in Thunderbolts* (2025))

== Alternate versions ==
Other versions of Wilson are depicted in the alternate realities of the MCU multiverse.

=== Zombie outbreak ===
In an alternate 2018, Wilson became infected by a quantum virus that turned him into a zombie. The zombified Wilson later attacks Bucky Barnes and Okoye at Grand Central Terminal before being killed by the latter.

=== Gamma War ===
In an alternate 2014, Wilson became friends with Bruce Banner while jogging in Washington D.C. He invited Banner to a support group and his family's fishing boat, where he and Sarah watched as Banner turned into the Hulk during a thunderstorm and fled.

10 years later, Wilson became Captain America after the original Avengers were killed by Kaiju-like monsters led by "Apex" Hulk. Wilson has been working closely with Bucky Barnes and Monica Rambeau. When the Apex returns, Wilson leads a new team consisting of Shang-Chi, Marc Spector, Nakia, Melina Vostokoff and Alexei Shostakov into piloting gigantic Hulkbuster Mech suits to fight off against the Apex and its army. On Rambeau's request, Wilson met Banner on an island and learned of the Mighty Avenger Protocol which aided them. However, during the battle in New York, Wilson watched as Banner turned into a Mega-Hulk to ultimately defeat the Apex.

== Concept, creation, and characterization ==
Samuel Thomas Wilson, known as the Falcon, was the first African-American superhero in mainstream comic books. This version of the character first appeared in Captain America #117 (Sept. 1969). Created by writer-editor Stan Lee and artist Gene Colan, he came about, Colan recalled in 2008,

...in the late 1960s [when news of the] Vietnam War and civil rights protests were regular occurrences, and Stan, always wanting to be at the forefront of things, started bringing these headlines into the comics. ... One of the biggest steps we took in this direction came in Captain America. I enjoyed drawing people of every kind. I drew as many different types of people as I could into the scenes I illustrated, and I loved drawing black people. I always found their features interesting and so much of their strength, spirit and wisdom written on their faces. I approached Stan, as I remember, with the idea of introducing an African-American hero and he took to it right away. ... I looked at several African-American magazines, and used them as the basis of inspiration for bringing The Falcon to life.

He was introduced as an unnamed former resident of New York City's Harlem neighborhood, who had adopted a wild falcon he trained and named Redwing. (His own name, Sam Wilson, was not given until page five of the following issue.) After Wilson came into conflict with the supervillain the Red Skull, Steve Rogers inspired Wilson to take on the costumed identity of the Falcon, and Wilson underwent training with Rogers. Through most of the 1970s, the Falcon and Captain America were a team in New York City, and the series was cover-billed Captain America and the Falcon from issues #134–192 and 194–222 (February 1971 – June 1978).

The Falcon eventually became a member of the Avengers from issues #183–194 (May 1979 – April 1980), and had a solo issue. After regularly appearing in Captain America vol. 2 (November 1996 – November 1997), the Falcon rejoined the Avengers in The Avengers vol. 3, #1 (February 1998). This time, he remained with the team, becoming one of its most prominent members by issue #57 (Oct. 2002). In 2014, Marvel announced that Wilson would succeed Rogers as the new Captain America, a mantle which the character thereafter assumed in several additional runs.

In the mid-2000s, Kevin Feige realized that Marvel still owned the rights to the core members of the Avengers, which included Captain America and his associated characters, including Wilson. Feige, a self-professed "fanboy", envisioned creating a shared universe just as creators Stan Lee and Jack Kirby had done with their comic books in the early 1960s. In 2005, Marvel received a $525 million investment from Merrill Lynch, allowing them to independently produce ten films, including Captain America. Paramount Pictures agreed to distribute the film. In July 2012, Anthony Mackie entered negotiations to star as Wilson/Falcon alongside Chris Evans in Captain America: The Winter Soldier. In November 2014, Mackie was confirmed to be returning in Captain America: Civil War. In early July 2015, an international teaser trailer revealed that Mackie would appear as Wilson/Falcon in Ant-Man. Mackie appears in the post-credit sequence as well, along with Chris Evans and Sebastian Stan as Steve Rogers / Captain America and Bucky Barnes / Winter Soldier, respectively.

=== Characterization ===
Entering the role, Mackie said "[Wilson is] a really smart guy who went through major military training and becomes a tactical leader." He also remarked, "He's the first African-American superhero. It makes me feel all the work I've done has been paying off. I have a son, nephews and nieces, and I love the idea that they can dress up as the Falcon on Halloween. They now have someone they can idolize. That's a huge honor for me." Marvel, who cast Mackie because of his "energy and sense of fun", did not let him read a script before signing on. Mackie spent five months doing two-a-day workouts and eating an 11,000 calorie per day diet to get into shape for the role. Commenting on Rogers' relationship with Wilson, Evans said, "Meeting Mackie's character, he used to serve, now he works at the VA counseling guys who come home with PTSD—they connect on that level. I think they're both wounded warriors who don't bleed on other people. Cap has no one to bleed on. I think Mackie knows how to handle people like that. ... Sometimes when things are bad, trusting a stranger is the way to go".

On including Falcon in Ant-Man, director Peyton Reed said that it was not done just to include the character, rather "[i]t served a plot point; a purpose in our story" and allowed them to enhance Michael Peña's "tip montages", which were written by production writers Gabriel Ferrari and Andrew Barrer, also adding Falcon "seemed like the right character—not a marquee character like Iron Man or Thor, but the right level of hero". Rudd and McKay decided to include Falcon after watching Captain America: The Winter Soldier.

Discussing the relationship between Wilson and Rogers in Captain America: Civil War, Mackie said, "With Falcon and Cap, what's so great is there's a mutual respect. There's a soldier respect. What's great about ... [Captain America: Civil War] is you get to see their relationship grow," adding, "He respects and admires Cap because Cap earned his rank as opposed to sitting in an office and just delegating orders." Feige said that it was decided to reshoot the final scene of the film to incorporate the new Falcon suit designed for Ant-Man, which was released after Age of Ultron, as Falcon was originally shot in his original suit from The Winter Soldier. Mackie stated he did not realize Wilson had become an Avenger until he watched the film at the premiere, as he was only given the script for the scenes he worked on.

Wilson uses a pair of submachine guns as his main weapons and flies using a jet pack with articulated wings. From Civil War on, he is aided by a robotic drone named Redwing. Joe Russo stated that the inclusion of Barnes to Rogers' side forces Wilson to question the dynamic and relationship he has with Rogers going forward. Mackie noted that in Infinity War, Wilson has a grudge with other heroes like Iron Man and Black Panther after the events of Civil War.

Wilson is set to reprise the role in Avengers: Doomsday (2026) and Avengers: Secret Wars (2027).

== Differences from the comic books ==
A number of differences have been observed between the comic book version of the character and the MCU adaptation. The character's comic book backstory is dispensed with entirely, with Wilson instead being introduced with a military background. In the comic book, Wilson has the ability to communicate with birds and is assisted in his heroics by an actual falcon named Redwing. In the films, this is replaced by a drone nicknamed Redwing, which the character is able to control remotely. Wilson's costume is also dramatically different from the bare-chested skintight outfit worn by the character in the comics, instead wearing a utilitarian outfit, though Mackie has indicated that he wanted to wear "red Spandex, head to toe" for the part.

== Reception ==
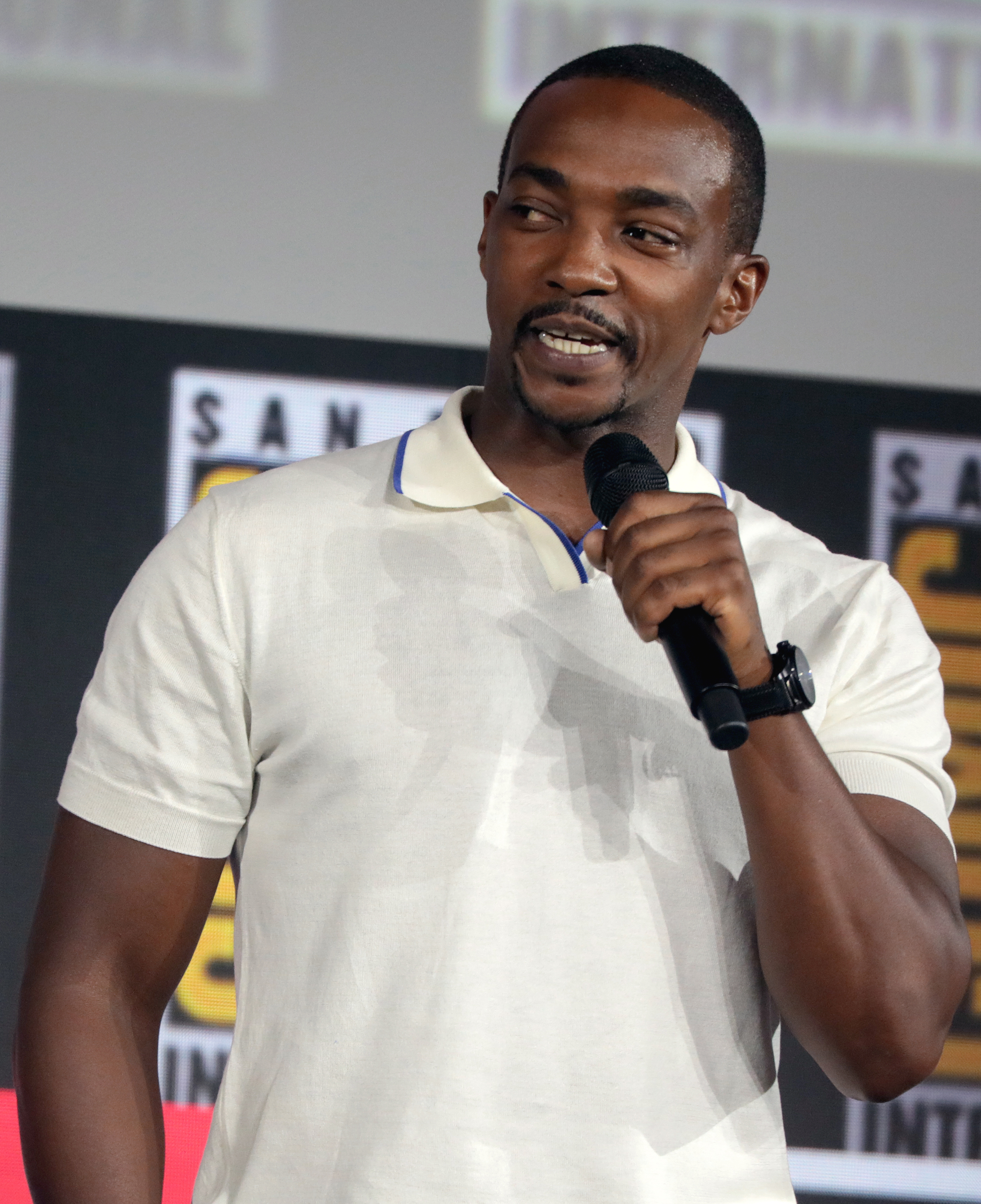
Mackie at the 2019 San Diego Comic-Con

=== Critical response ===
The response to the character of Wilson was mixed, with Jacob Stolworthy of The Independent feeling he was "memorable solely due to the vibrancy the entertaining actor [Mackie] brings to the role." However, Mackie's portrayal of Wilson was widely praised, with Matt Donnelly of Variety noting his "winning tone" and "wry and collegial humour" in the role. Andy Welch of The Guardian praised Wilson's speech to the Global Repatriation Council as Wilson's "greatest moment" in the final episode of The Falcon and the Winter Soldier, adding that there were "plenty of miles left" in Wilson's partnership with Sebastian Stan's Bucky Barnes.

=== Awards and nominations ===
Year	Award	Category	Work	Recipient(s)	Result	Ref.
2014	Teen Choice Awards	Choice Movie Scene Stealer	Captain America: The Winter Soldier	Anthony Mackie	Nominated	
2014	Teen Choice Awards	Choice Movie: Chemistry	Captain America: The Winter Soldier	Anthony Mackie and Chris Evans	Nominated	
2015	Saturn Awards	Best Supporting Actor	Captain America: The Winter Soldier	Anthony Mackie	Nominated	
2016	Teen Choice Awards	Choice Movie: Chemistry	Captain America: Civil War	Cast (Note: Along with Anthony Mackie, which includes Chris Evans, Sebastian Stan, Elizabeth Olsen, and Jeremy Renner)	Nominated	
2017	Kids' Choice Awards	#SQUAD	Captain America: Civil War	Cast (Note: Along with Anthony Mackie, which includes Chris Evans, Robert Downey Jr., Scarlett Johansson, Sebastian Stan, Don Cheadle, Jeremy Renner, Chadwick Boseman)	Nominated	
2021	MTV Movie & TV Awards	Best Hero	The Falcon and the Winter Soldier	Anthony Mackie	Won	
2021	MTV Movie & TV Awards	Best Duo	The Falcon and the Winter Soldier	Anthony Mackie and Sebastian Stan	Won	
2021	Black Reel Awards	Outstanding Actor, Drama Series	The Falcon and the Winter Soldier	Anthony Mackie	Nominated	
2021	Hollywood Critics Association TV Awards	Best Actor in a Streaming Series, Drama	The Falcon and the Winter Soldier	Anthony Mackie	Nominated	
2021	People's Choice Awards	Male TV Star of 2021	The Falcon and the Winter Soldier	Anthony Mackie	Nominated	
2022	Critics' Choice Super Awards	Best Actor in a Superhero Series	The Falcon and the Winter Soldier	Anthony Mackie	Nominated	
2022	Saturn Awards	Best Actor in a Streaming Television Series	The Falcon and the Winter Soldier	Anthony Mackie	Nominated	
2025	Kids' Choice Awards	Favorite Butt-Kicker	Captain America: Brave New World	Anthony Mackie	Nominated	
2025	Critics' Choice Super Awards	Best Actor in a Superhero Movie	Captain America: Brave New World	Anthony Mackie	Pending	

== See also ==
- Captain America in other media
- Characters of the Marvel Cinematic Universe
