= Power Broker (character) =

Fictional comic book characters

Power Broker is the name of two characters appearing in American comic books published by Marvel Comics. The "Power Broker" concept was devised by Mark Gruenwald as a satire on the public obsession with health and fitness.

A reimagined version of the Power Broker appears in the Marvel Cinematic Universe (MCU) television shows The Falcon and the Winter Soldier (2021) and What If...? (2024), as the alias of Sharon Carter, portrayed by Emily VanCamp.

== Publication history ==
The Curtiss Jackson version of Power Broker first appeared in Machine Man #6 (September 1978) and was created by Roger Stern and Sal Buscema.

The second version of Power Broker first appeared in Avengers: The Initiative Annual #1 (January 2008) and was created by Dan Slott and Christos N. Gage.

== Fictional character biography ==
=== Curtiss Jackson ===
Power Broker

Publication information
- Publisher: Marvel Comics
- First appearance: Machine Man #6 (September 1978); The Thing #35 (May 1986; as Power Broker)
- Created by: Roger Stern; Sal Buscema

In-story information
- Alter ego: Curtiss Jackson
- Species: Human
- Team affiliations: The Corporation; Power Broker, Inc.
- Partnerships: Red Skull

Curtiss Jackson was born in Charlotte, North Carolina. He became a professional criminal and an executive with the criminal organization known as the Corporation. Jackson founds the Power Broker Corporation and hires Karl Malus, a mad scientist who has experimented on various superhuman individuals, to technologically augment the strength of paying customers to superhuman levels. The strength augmenting process is tremendously risky, with half the subjects dying or becoming severely deformed, but this information is kept a closely guarded secret. Power Broker and Malus use highly addictive drugs on their subjects, telling them that the chemical is necessary to stabilize their powers, but in fact it only serves to keep the subjects working for—and paying—the Power Broker. Many wrestlers of the Unlimited Class Wrestling Federation, which is only open to those with super-strength, use the Power Broker's services and wind up indebted to him.

When Power Broker, Inc. is attacked by the Scourge of the Underworld, Curtiss Jackson exposes himself to his own augmentation device. The process goes awry, leaving him so grotesquely muscle-bound that he cannot move. Due to Malus being unable to cure him, Jackson utilizes an exoskeleton for mobility.

Jackson resurfaces in the Maximum Security storyline, having returned to his normal appearance. Seeing an opportunity to recruit prisoners being dumped by the Kree and other alien races, Jackson races to an area his computers determined would have a large amount of arrivals. Unfortunately for Jackson, the aliens are less than pleased at having been dumped on Earth and attack him. Playing dead, Jackson encounters a parasitic organism who had lost its host. In exchange for becoming its host, Jackson is granted the use of the parasite's spawn to infect and control others. In his plan to take over the world, Jackson smuggles the parasite spawns to a Hydra base and a rebel Atlantean group. These operations are broken up by S.T.A.R.S. (Superhuman Tactical Activities Response Squad) and their main agent, U.S. Agent, leading the group to take down the Power Broker once again.

The Punisher later kills and impersonates Jackson in order to infiltrate a supervillain auction on Long Island.

=== Second version ===
Very little is known about the second version of the Power Broker other than he wears a battle suit and can project bolts of energy from his hands. He was responsible for giving Paul Brokeridge super-strength to wrestle in the Unlimited Class Wrestling Federation, a move that led to Paul attaining the championship and later being crippled by a stronger wrestler. Power Broker was also responsible for giving Paul's brother Roger superpowers; Roger later became the superhero Hardball.

Power Broker proceeds to invest in Hench, a mobile app that allows its users to quickly hire supervillains. He demonstrates his invention to Darren Cross by enlisting Whirlwind to kill Ant-Man. When Cross refuses to invest at least 1.2 billion dollars in Hench, Power Broker ends the demo and cancels Whirlwind's attempted assassination of Ant-Man.

Cassie Lang attempts to get abilities from Power Broker with the intention of double-crossing him. However, Power Broker realizes that she does not have what it takes to be a villain. Instead, Power Broker tells her that Darren Cross has stolen her heart and that her father Scott Lang hid it from her. As Cross had stolen something from him, he makes a deal with her: he will give her powers to do with as she wants. In exchange, she must retrieve the item that Cross took from him and in the process get her revenge on him. Cassie chooses to have her old powers back because she does not want to learn a new power set. She is given a new suit and a helmet similar to her father's while sporting the new name of Stinger.

At a public event, Power Broker revealed the Hench X app, which enables anyone to become a supervillain. He tests it out on a former comic store clerk named Paul, who ends up becoming the second Plantman.

Some time later, Power Broker runs out of funding for his Hench app and flees to his secret island, where he begins work on an app for supervillain travel booking. However, his investors turn down the idea.

== Powers and abilities ==
The Curtiss Jackson version of Power Broker was an ordinary man until he exposed himself to his own chemical and radiation strength augmentation process. This granted him superhuman strength and durability, but it left him with a grotesquely overdeveloped muscular physique which renders him unable to move without artificial aids. Dr. Karl Malus invented a powerful steel alloy exo-skeleton with tongue controls and flight capabilities to enable the Power Broker to move. Jackson has managed to de-augment himself and no longer uses the exo-skeleton. Jackson was briefly the host to a parasitic organism. This allowed him to mind-control anyone infected with the organism's spawn. Jackson has a college degree in business administration, and is a highly skilled administrator and planner.

The second Power Broker wears a battlesuit and can project bolts of energy from his hands.

== In other media ==
=== Marvel Cinematic Universe ===
An original incarnation of the Power Broker, Sharon Carter, appears in the Marvel Cinematic Universe (MCU), making her debut in the miniseries The Falcon and the Winter Soldier (2021), portrayed by Emily VanCamp. An alternate version of the Power Broker appears in the What If...? episode "What If... the Emergence destroyed the Earth?", also voiced by VanCamp.
