= Malcolm Spellman =

American screenwriter and producer

- Occupations: Screenwriter; producer
- Years active: 2010–present
- Notable work: Empire; The Falcon and the Winter Soldier; Bel-Air; Captain America: Brave New World
- Spouse: Nichelle Tramble Spellman
- Father: A. B. Spellman

Malcolm Spellman is an American screenwriter and producer best known for his work on Empire (2015), The Falcon and the Winter Soldier (2021), Bel-Air (2022–23), and Captain America: Brave New World (2025).

== Career ==
In March 2010, Spellman started his career by writing the screenplay for the film Our Family Wedding (2010). In February 2015, Spellman began writing for television by scripting several episodes of the television series Empire (2015). In October 2015, Spellman and Carlito Rodriguez were hired by Warner Bros. to write the script for a Sylvia Robinson film biopic. In October 2018, it was announced that Warner Bros. was still moving forward with the film and Spellman and Rodriguez had been joined by Tracy Oliver in completing the script. In July 2017, Spellman was producing the HBO series Confederate.

In December 2019, he served as a producer on the Apple TV+ series Truth Be Told (2019). In February 2021, Spellman served as an executive producer on the FX series Hip Hop Uncovered (2021). In March 2021, he gained notability from serving as showrunner on the Disney+ series The Falcon and the Winter Soldier (2021), set in the Marvel Cinematic Universe (MCU). In December 2021, he served as writer and executive producer on the 2022 revival series Bel-Air. He co-wrote Captain America: Brave New World in the MCU, with Dalan Musson and Matthew Orton. In October 2022, it was revealed that Spellman would write the upcoming film King Spawn alongside Scott Silver and Matthew Mixon. In November 2025, he was set as lead writer and executive producer on The Drop: A Snowfall Saga which is a spinoff of Snowfall, after it was ordered to series and premiere on September 9, 2026.

== Filmography ==
=== Film ===
Year	Title	Credited as		Notes / Ref(s)
Year	Title	Writer	Producer	Notes / Ref(s)
2010	Our Family Wedding	Yes	No	
2019	His, Hers and the Truth	No	Co-producer	
2025	Captain America: Brave New World	Yes	No	Also story writer

=== Television ===
Year	Title	Credited as			Notes / Ref(s)
Year	Title	Writer	Executive producer	Creator	Notes / Ref(s)
2015–17	Empire	Yes	Co-executive	No	Wrote 7 episodes
2019–20	Truth Be Told	No	Consulting	No	
2021	Hip Hop Uncovered	No	Yes	No	
2021	The Falcon and the Winter Soldier	Yes	Yes	Yes	Wrote 2 episodes
2022–23	Bel-Air	Yes	Yes	Developer	Wrote 2 episodes
2026–present	The Drop: A Snowfall Saga	Yes	Yes	Yes	Wrote 1 episode

== Accolades ==
For his work on The Falcon and the Winter Soldier, he was nominated at the Black Reel Awards of 2021 and the 53rd NAACP Image Awards for "Outstanding Writing, Drama Series" and "Outstanding Drama Series" for the former and "Outstanding Writing in a Dramatic Series" for the latter. For his work on Bel-Air, he was nominated at the Black Reel Awards of 2022 for "Outstanding Writing, Drama Series".
