= New World Order (The Falcon and the Winter Soldier) =

- The Falcon and the Winter Soldier episode
- The first of several art posters released for the series, with art by SzarkaArt
- Episode no.: Episode 1
- Directed by: Kari Skogland
- Written by: Malcolm Spellman
- Cinematography by: P. J. Dillon
- Editing by: Jeffrey Ford; Kelley Dixon
- Original release date: March 19, 2021
- Running time: 49 minutes

Cast
- Desmond Chiam as Dovich; Dani Deetee as Gigi; Indya Bussey as DeeDee; Amy Aquino as Dr. Raynor; Chase River McGhee as Cass; Aaron Haynes as AJ; Ken Takemoto as Yori; Ian Gregg as Unique; Miki Ishikawa as Leah; Vince Pisani as a loan officer; Alphie Hyorth as a government official; Rebecca Lines as Senator Atwood; Jon Briddell as Major Hill; Miles Brew as Colonel Vassant; Charles Black as Carlos; Akie Kotabe as RJ

Episode chronology
← Previous —	Next → "The Star-Spangled Man"

"New World Order" is the first episode of the American television miniseries The Falcon and the Winter Soldier, based on Marvel Comics featuring the characters Sam Wilson / Falcon and Bucky Barnes / Winter Soldier. It follows the pair as they adjust to life after returning from the Blip at the end of Avengers: Endgame (2019). The episode is set in the Marvel Cinematic Universe (MCU), sharing continuity with the films of the franchise. It was written by head writer Malcolm Spellman and directed by Kari Skogland.

Sebastian Stan and Anthony Mackie reprise their respective roles as Bucky Barnes and Sam Wilson from the film series, with Wyatt Russell, Erin Kellyman, Danny Ramirez, Georges St-Pierre, Adepero Oduye, and Don Cheadle also starring. Development began by October 2018, with Spellman hired to serve as head writer of the series. Skogland joined in May 2019. They focused on exploring the title characters, including themes related to Wilson's life as a Black superhero in America and his response to being handed the mantle of Captain America in Endgame. Filming took place at Pinewood Atlanta Studios in Atlanta, Georgia, with location filming occurring in the Atlanta metropolitan area and in Prague. An aerial battle was mostly filmed practically with Red Bull Air Force skydivers in wingsuits; Weta Digital integrated this and other footage with a digital background and additional effects.

"New World Order" was released on the streaming service Disney+ on March 19, 2021. It became the most-watched Disney+ series premiere, surpassing the series premiere of WandaVision. The episode received positive reviews from critics, with praise going to its opening aerial battle, the characterization of Wilson and Barnes, and the racial themes included. However, it received criticism over Wilson and Barnes not sharing any scenes together and there were some negative comparisons made between the episode and Marvel Television's Netflix series. The episode received several accolades, including a Primetime Creative Arts Emmy Award nomination for Cheadle's role as James Rhodes.

== Plot ==
Six months after half of all life returned from the Blip, (Note: As a result of the Avengers' actions during the events of the film Avengers: Endgame (2019)) the U.S. Air Force sends Sam Wilson to stop a plane hijacking over Tunisia by the terrorist group LAF, led by Georges Batroc. With ground support from first lieutenant Joaquin Torres, Wilson fights the terrorists and rescues Air Force Captain Vassant before they cross into Libyan airspace and cause an international incident. On the ground, Torres tells Wilson about another terrorist group, the Flag Smashers, who believe life was better during the Blip.

In Washington, D.C., Wilson gives Captain America's shield to the U.S. government to display in a museum exhibit about Steve Rogers. He later explains to James Rhodes that he feels like the shield still belongs to Rogers. In Delacroix, Louisiana, Wilson's sister Sarah struggles to keep the family fishing business going. He offers to use his status as a famous superhero to help them get a new loan, but they are turned down due to the business's poor profits and Wilson's lack of income during his five-year absence.

Meanwhile, in New York City, Bucky Barnes attends government-mandated therapy after being pardoned for his actions as the brainwashed assassin known as the Winter Soldier. He discusses his attempts to make amends for his time as the Winter Soldier with his therapist, Dr. Raynor. Barnes later has lunch with an elderly man named Yori, who convinces him to go on a date with a waitress named Leah. Both Yori and Leah discuss how Yori's son RJ was killed with no explanation. Barnes recalls killing RJ as the Winter Soldier, which happened after RJ witnessed an assassination by him in the hotel where he was staying. Barnes is unable to reveal this to Yori, and has also been ignoring text messages from Wilson.

Torres investigates the Flag Smashers and sees a bank robbery in Switzerland perpetrated by a group member with superhuman strength. Torres confronts him, but is knocked unconscious. He later informs Wilson of what he has learned. Wilson then sees the government announce a new Captain America, giving Rogers's shield to John Walker.

== Production ==
=== Development ===
By October 2018, Marvel Studios was developing a limited series starring Anthony Mackie's Sam Wilson / Falcon and Sebastian Stan's Bucky Barnes / Winter Soldier from the Marvel Cinematic Universe (MCU) films. Malcolm Spellman was hired as head writer of the series, which was announced as The Falcon and the Winter Soldier in April 2019. Spellman modeled the series after buddy films that deal with race, such as 48 Hrs. (1982), The Defiant Ones (1958), Lethal Weapon (1987), and Rush Hour (1998). Kari Skogland was hired to direct the miniseries a month later, and executive produced alongside Spellman and Marvel Studios' Kevin Feige, Louis D'Esposito, Victoria Alonso, and Nate Moore. Written by Spellman, the first episode is titled "New World Order".

=== Writing ===
The series is set six months after the film Avengers: Endgame (2019). Spellman said the series' characters are dealing with the state of the MCU following the Blip, as seen in that film, which has similarities to the real post-COVID-19 pandemic era. Feige described the state of the MCU as a "new world order". The episode explores Wilson and Barnes separately, showing their lives after Endgame. Feige suggested this approach because he felt the two characters had always existed within the larger context of MCU films and needed to be introduced to the audience as individuals before being brought together as a team in future episodes.

The creative team wanted to introduce more elements of Wilson's life, including his family, friends, and hometown. Though Wilson was originally based in Harlem in Marvel Comics, they decided to base him in Mackie's home of New Orleans to relate the character to Mackie's personal life. One of the post-Blip details that the episode explores is when Wilson tries to get a bank loan with his sister, Sarah. Actress Adepero Oduye felt the bank scene explored a different facet of the MCU in a realistic and grounded manner. Spellman revealed that specifics of the scene were debated "all the way up to the top" at Marvel Studios to ensure it would resonate with audiences due to the struggle for Black people to obtain bank loans that it depicts. He added that "every one of us who is Black in day to day life have those experiences ... how could you ever write [Wilson] going to get a loan without dealing with the reality of what happens when Black people try to get loans?" For Barnes, the episode shows him attempting to make amends for his violent actions as the Winter Soldier. He befriends Yori, the father of one of his victims, who Spellman intended to represent all of the Winter Soldier's victims. Barnes is shown having "some level of normalcy", including discussing online dating, but feels that he does not belong to any era.

The central conflict that Spellman and Marvel wanted to explore with the series was whether Wilson would become Captain America after being handed the shield by Steve Rogers at the end of Endgame. They felt that having the US government "betray" Wilson by naming someone else as Captain America would be the most appropriate way to align with the series' themes. They went through many different versions before settling on the final storyline: Wilson chooses to give up the shield early in the episode, and then John Walker is introduced as the new government-approved Captain America at the end. Skogland described this ending as "the hammer into the nail" for the conversation regarding Wilson's relinquishment of the shield, and it kickstarts the story for the rest of the series. She highlighted the nationalist rhetoric used in the announcement, with quotes such as "relatable", "this country", and "America's greatest values". Spellman explained that Wilson would focus on his internal doubts after seeing the government hand the shield to "some unknown white guy" and added that a Black man being betrayed by his country was powerful but unsurprising to both Wilson and the audience. He was confident in exploring that interpretation of betrayal as the writers' room mostly consisted of Black people who were equipped to candidly portray the difficulties that the first African-American superhero would face. He said Wilson was uncertain because of Rogers's absence, which had put pressure on Wilson, and also because he was a Black man being handed Captain America's mantle. Spellman felt it would be dishonest to "tell a story about a Black man holding that shield without his identity making him very, very ambivalent about whether or not it's a good thing".

Spellman initially wanted the government to take the shield from Wilson, but Moore suggested that Wilson relinquish it on his own to make it more of a character moment. When Wilson does this in the episode, his decision is questioned by James "Rhodey" Rhodes / War Machine. Skogland said Rhodes was a mentor for Wilson in the series, while Spellman said the two characters have a shorthand that allows the audience to "fill in the blanks" when the pair pause during the scene. Spellman also felt that it was apparent to audiences that the scene features the two main Black superheroes from the MCU having a quiet moment together and said there is an underlying suggestion that Rhodes has filled the role left by his friend Tony Stark / Iron Man and is wondering why Wilson has not done the same for Rogers. Many iterations of this scene were discussed, including a version where Wilson and Rhodes talk while flying in their respective superhero suits, but ultimately a quieter and more poignant direction was taken with the pair walking around a museum exhibit.

=== Casting ===
The episode stars Sebastian Stan as Bucky Barnes, Anthony Mackie as Sam Wilson, Wyatt Russell as John Walker, Erin Kellyman as Karli Morgenthau, Danny Ramirez as Joaquin Torres, Georges St-Pierre as Georges Batroc, Adepero Oduye as Sarah Wilson, and Don Cheadle as James "Rhodey" Rhodes. Also appearing are Desmond Chiam, Dani Deetté, and Indya Bussey as the Flag Smashers Dovich, Gigi, and DeeDee, respectively, Amy Aquino as Barnes's therapist Dr. Raynor, Chase River McGhee and Aaron Haynes as Wilson's nephews Cass and AJ, Ken Takemoto as Yori, Ian Gregg as Unique, Miki Ishikawa as Leah, Vince Pisani as a loan officer, Alphie Hyorth as a government official, Rebecca Lines as Senator Atwood, Jon Briddell as Major Hill, Miles Brew as Colonel Vassant, Charles Black as Carlos, and Akie Kotabe as Yori's son RJ. Archival audio of Chris Evans as Steve Rogers from Avengers: Endgame is heard in the episode.

=== Filming ===
Filming for the series officially began in November 2019, taking place at Pinewood Atlanta Studios in Atlanta, Georgia, with Skogland directing and P.J. Dillon serving as cinematographer. Location filming took place in the Atlanta metropolitan area, Prague, and at the Maxwell Air Force Base and Dobbins Air Reserve Base in Georgia and Alabama, respectively. The series was shot like a film, with Skogland and Dillon filming all of the content at once based on available locations. Most of the first episode's footage was filmed before production was halted due to the COVID-19 pandemic in March 2020.

Feige encouraged Skogland to use her own directing style rather than trying to match with the MCU films, and she chose to use different camera work that was "more off-kilter than Marvel usually is" to create a more intimate feeling. This included opening the episode with Wilson quietly ironing, which she felt conveyed intimacy and perspective. For Barnes's therapy scene, Skogland and Dillon wanted to convey how uncomfortable he was by putting the camera close to Stan on unusual angles with a wide lens. Dillon noted that fans of the series responded to this because it was something that many had not seen before, but he did not feel it was an unusual approach to take for such a situation. He and Skogland wanted to treat the series' characters like "any other characters in any other drama" series rather than change their filming style because this was a Marvel series. Dillon tried to differentiate the cinematography for Barnes and Wilson, believing that the former is "empty emotionally... we tried to shoot him in a way that felt very cold and austere. And we tried to reflect the loneliness or the emptiness he's feeling." Conversely, Wilson's scenes in Louisiana were meant to feel "very warm and inviting, and just more attractive", with Dillon and Skogland taking a natural approach to the cinematographer to make sure it did not look like a superhero film. Skogland and Dillon used low angles for the introduction of Walker as Captain America, emulating a traditional character reveal but "overd[oing] it a bit" to reflect his personality.

An aerial battle with Wilson was always planned for the episode to let the character shine in a way that he did not in the films. In addition to helicopters and planes, the sequence includes several villain characters in wingsuits which gave Wilson the opportunity to chase other people in the air. Skogland began desiging the sequence early on with visual effects supervisor Eric Leven, whose team created storyboards and pre-visualizations of how the sequence would look. These were then shown to Dillon and stunt coordinator Hank Amos so they could begin planning what elements would be filmed practically, and how. Skogland was inspired by YouTube videos of people using wingsuits that were filmed with helmet and body mounted cameras, but Amos said the usual quality of wingsuit footage would not be up to the standards of a Marvel Studios production. The series' normal cameras, Panavision's DXL2 8K camera, were far too big and heavy to be used, and Amos said they had to "[throw] the rule book away in regards to what was currently believed possible for capturing 'air to air' wingsuit flying on camera". They settled on Blackmagic Design's Pocket Cinema Camera 6K cameras, which were small and light enough for the skydivers to carry but high-enough resolution that the footage could be integrated with the rest of the series.

Skogland and Dillon planned the opening action sequence's visual approach, skydiver Travis Fienhage was the aerial coordinator, and Paul Hughes was the aerial cinematographer. Red Bull Air Force skydivers were filmed over three or four days, using six Blackmagic cameras that were attached to the skydivers' helmets, chests, and wingsuits. Each camera captured four to six minutes of footage per jump. This was the first time that something bigger than a small action camera had been used "for more than just a helmet mounted configuration". Dillon said the result "worked really well because it feels quite visceral. You're taken into the scene from the skydiver's point of view, and you become a part of the action". He said the skydiver footage brought energy to the sequence, which was otherwise made up of blue screen footage and visual effects. The Blackmagic cameras were also used for some of the blue screen filming, such as shots where the camera was mounted to a rig to approximate a camera filming from one of Wilson's wings.

=== Visual effects ===
Visual effects progression of a shot from the opening aerial battle, showing the combination of physical photography of star Anthony Mackie with computer-generated imagery by Weta Digital

Eric Leven served as the visual effects supervisor for The Falcon and the Winter Soldier, with the episode's visual effects created by Weta Digital, QPPE, Cantina Creative, Trixter, Crafty Apes, Stereo D, Digital Frontier FX, and Tippett Studio. Weta Digital was tasked with working on the opening action sequence and delivered 150 shots. They began by reviewing the pre-visualization work for the scene, suggesting revisions to help improve the story and sense of jeopardy. They then combined the skydiver and blue screen footage with a digital environment and additional effects. Leven and Amos both estimated that the sequence was 90 percent practical.

The digital canyon environment was based on Paria Canyon, which is located near the Arizona-Utah border, as well as deserts in Libya. Digital body doubles of Mackie were used to help integrate footage of him in front of blue screens with the digital background, while the skydivers had to be rotoscoped out of their footage to be integrated. The sequence also includes helicopters, with actors that were filmed practically and then inserted into the helicopter digitally, and a C130 plane. Some footage of a practical plane was shot at an Air Force base that Weta adjusted to look like it was flying. The practical filming with Mackie and the plane was done during poor weather that did not match with the intended weather of the sequence, so Weta had to digitally adjust the lighting on that footage. Other changes they made included adjustments to costumes, depth-of-field effects, and emulating the look of a fisheye lens to give the impression that certain shots were filmed with a GoPro camera. The speed of Wilson and the skydivers while flying is intended to be around 350 kilometers per hour (218 miles per hour), which was based on the speed of an NH90 helicopter. To make individuals appear to be moving faster than that, the animators moved them closer to the terrain, taking advantage of how perception of speed is related to perception of depth.

=== Music ===
Selections from composer Henry Jackman's score for the episode were included in the series' Vol. 1 soundtrack album, which was released digitally by Marvel Music and Hollywood Records on April 9, 2021.

== Marketing ==
On March 19, 2021, Marvel announced a series of posters that were created by various artists to correspond with the episodes of the series. The posters were released weekly ahead of each episode, with the first poster, designed by SzarkaArt, being revealed on March 19. After the episode's release, Marvel announced merchandise inspired by the episode as part of its weekly "Marvel Must Haves" promotion for each episode of the series, including apparel, accessories, toys, a replica Captain America shield, and collectible Topps trading cards for the digital card game Marvel Collect!

== Release ==
"New World Order" was released on Disney+ on March 19, 2021. The episode, along with the rest of The Falcon and the Winter Soldier, was released on Ultra HD Blu-ray and Blu-ray on April 30, 2024.

== Reception ==
=== Viewership ===
Disney+ announced that "New World Order" was the most-watched series premiere for the service in its opening weekend (March 19 to 22, 2021), besting the premieres of WandaVision and the second season of The Mandalorian. Using its proprietary Automatic Content Recognition technology on opted-in smart TVs, Samba TV reported that 1.7 million households watched the episode in its opening weekend. Nielsen Media Research, which measures the number of minutes watched by United States audiences on television sets, listed The Falcon and the Winter Soldier as the second-most-watched original series across streaming services for the week of March 15–21, with 495 million minutes viewed. This is around 9.9 million views based on the episode's running time, and is ahead of the 434 million minutes of WandaVision that were viewed in its premiere week.

=== Critical response ===
The review aggregator website Rotten Tomatoes reported a 93% approval rating with an average score of 7.7/10 based on 135 reviews. The site's critical consensus reads, "An ambitious blend of big screen action and intimate storytelling, The Falcon and the Winter Soldier's opening episode makes a strong case that smaller MCU moments can still pack a serious punch."

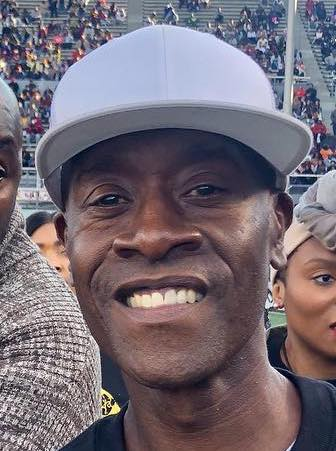
Despite his short screentime, Don Cheadle was nominated for Outstanding Guest Actor in a Drama Series for his role in the episode at the 73rd Primetime Creative Arts Emmy Awards

Giving the episode a "B+", Matt Webb Mitovich from TVLine said it promised feature film-quality action and overdue insight into Wilson and Barnes. He called the opening set piece "a breathless piece of filmmaking" that improved Wilson's status as a lead hero, and enjoyed Wilson's scenes with his sister. Matt Purslow at IGN gave the episode an 8 out of 10, praising its serious tone and for having genuine depth. He also praised the action and felt it thoughtfully dealt with themes such as trauma, duty, and legacy. Writing for Variety, Daniel D'Addario said the episode's action was "lighter and more fluid than the dirgey relentlessness of Avengers" but also felt it had a "curiosity about what it is to be a superhero" that D'Addario felt was missing from the MCU films. Daniel Fienberg from The Hollywood Reporter looked at the episode as two series: Wilson's features "the boffo action opening" and an exploration of Blackness and people impacted by the Blip, deeming it to have an overall "freshness"; and Barnes's story which he negatively compared to Marvel's Netflix television series. Fienberg looked forward to future interactions between the characters.

Entertainment Weekly's Chancellor Agard felt the opening set piece was Marvel wanting to prove that the series would match the production value of the films. He said the strongest aspect of the episode was its examination of Wilson and Barnes, enjoying how the bank loan scene presented an interesting obstacle for Wilson and acknowledged the reality of being Black in America. He was excited to see how Walker's introduction as Captain America at the end of the episode would intersect with the Flag Smashers. However, Agard criticized the episode's pacing, which he felt prioritized the season's story over the episode's, comparing this to the Marvel Netflix series. He was also critical of Mackie and Stan not having any scenes together. Agard gave "New World Order" a "B". His colleague Christian Holub described the episode as straightforward and enjoyed the action, but was less impressed with the character-focused scenes.

Sulagna Misra gave the episode a "B" for The A.V. Club, calling it a "redux" of the MCU film Captain America: The Winter Soldier (2014). She was unclear about the Flag Smasher's philosophy, felt the episode's ending was abrupt, and said it suffered from too much exposition. Misra was surprised with how inventive the opening sequence was, likening it to Top Gun (1986), and enjoyed the characterization; she was hopeful the next episode would include scenes of Wilson and Barnes together. Alan Sepinwall at Rolling Stone said the episode "mostly echoes what we've seen before", comparing it to a big-budget version of the Marvel Netflix series. He felt the opening sequences had some cool moments but was repetitive and lacked uniqueness for Wilson's character. He disliked the episode's tone, sayin it had "a lot of languid shots of one hero or the other feeling bummed", and was critical of Wilson and Barnes not being together. Giving the episode 3 out of 5 stars, Alec Bojalad of Den of Geek said it came across as a longer Marvel Studios: Legends recap episode and was frustrated that Barnes's story covered similar ground to the films unlike Wilson's.

=== Accolades ===
Award	Date of ceremony	Category	Recipient(s)	Result	Ref(s)
Black Reel Awards	August 15, 2021	Outstanding Writing, Drama Series	Malcolm Spellman	Nominated	
Primetime Creative Arts Emmy Awards	September 11–September 12, 2021	Outstanding Guest Actor in a Drama Series	Don Cheadle	Nominated	
Hollywood Professional Association Awards	November 18, 2021	Outstanding Visual Effects – Episodic (Under 13 Episodes) or Non-theatrical Feature	Johannes Bresser, Mark Smith, Alexia Cui, Paul Jenness, Sebastian Bommersheim	Nominated	
NAACP Image Awards	February 26, 2022	Outstanding Writing in a Dramatic Series	Malcolm Spellman	Nominated	
Visual Effects Society	March 8, 2022	Outstanding Compositing and Lighting in an Episode	Nathan Abbot, Beck Veitch, Markus Reithoffer, James Alduos	Nominated	

In response to criticism that he should not have been nominated for an Emmy award due to his short screentime in the episode, Cheadle said that he did not "really get it either".
