= Flag-Smasher =

Marvel Comics fictional character

- The Flag-Smasher explains his politics.

Publication information
- Publisher: Marvel Comics
- First appearance: Captain America #312 (December 1985)
- Created by: Mark Gruenwald; Paul Neary

In-story information
- Alter ego: Karl Morgenthau
- Species: Human
- Team affiliations: ULTIMATUM
- Abilities: Brilliant terrorist strategist Gifted hand to hand combatant Arsenal of weapons provided by ULTIMATUM

The Flag-Smasher is the name used by different anti-nationalist supervillains appearing in American comic books published by Marvel Comics: Karl Morgenthau and Guy Thierrault. The original version was most often a foe of Captain America while other adversaries include the Punisher, Moon Knight, Ghost Rider, the Runaways, the Liberteens and Deadpool.

A group called the Flag Smashers appeared in the Marvel Cinematic Universe / Disney+ series The Falcon and the Winter Soldier (2021), led by a female version of the Karl Morgenthau incarnation renamed Karli Morgenthau (portrayed by Erin Kellyman).

== Concept and creation ==
Mark Gruenwald created Flag-Smasher as a character in the tradition of the Red Skull: a villain with a symbolic aspect that would make him a nemesis specifically intended for Captain America. Whereas the Red Skull symbolizes Nazism, Flag-Smasher symbolizes anti-patriotism. The character first appeared in Captain America #312 (Dec. 1985).

== Fictional character biography ==
=== Karl Morgenthau ===
The first Flag-Smasher, Karl Morgenthau, is the son of a wealthy Swiss banker-turned-diplomat, in Bern, Switzerland. He wanted to follow in his father's footsteps and become a diplomat until his father was trampled to death in a riot at a Latverian embassy. He came to believe that humanity needed to do away with the concept of countries and nationalism that made people feel superior to those of different nationalities.

The Flag-Smasher uses terrorism to spread anti-nationalist sentiment. He conducts a one-man terrorist campaign in New York City against nationalist symbols, holding hundreds as hostages until Captain America captures him. Flag-Smasher establishes ULTIMATUM (Underground Liberated Totally Integrated Mobile Army To Unite Mankind), an anti-nationalistic terrorist organization, with himself its Supreme Commander. With ULTIMATUM, he hijacks an American airliner, holds its passengers hostage, and demands the surrender of Captain America, who joins forces with S.H.I.E.L.D. to thwart his plot. Captain America tries to persuade the Flag-Smasher that while his violent methods are unacceptable, his overall goal of world peace and cooperation is laudable and he should promote it by being a positive example. However, Flag-Smasher refuses to listen and has to be subdued by force.

The Flag-Smasher later learns that the Red Skull had been funding ULTIMATUM. Believing that his unwilling association with the Red Skull will diminish his reputation, Flag-Smasher reluctantly teams up with Captain America, Battlestar, and Demolition Man in thwarting ULTIMATUM's plot to set off a worldwide electromagnetic pulse that would have disabled all electrically-powered machinery.

The Flag-Smasher is installed as the ruler of Rumekistan by the V-Battalion as a compromise between powers. He is later assassinated by Domino, which results in Cable becoming the interim leader of Rumekistan.

=== Guy Thierrault ===
Following the original Flag-Smasher's death, Canadian ULTIMATUM agent Guy Thierrault assumes the mantle to continue his agenda. During the "Civil War" story arc, he attacks the Santa Monica Farmers' Market to show his opposition to the Super-Human Registration Act, but is stopped by the Runaways.

Flag-Smasher launches an attack on a New York diner, where Rikki Barnes is having a chat with her friend John. The explosion causes John to get hurt, and Rikki quickly puts on her new Nomad uniform to fight the Flag-Smasher. The Falcon and Redwing help Nomad defeat the Flag-Smasher, who is arrested.

The Flag-Smasher later kidnaps a Middle Eastern banker, but is confronted by Flash Thompson. Thompson loses control due to the Venom symbiote's murderous tendencies and kills the Flag-Smasher's cohorts before biting off Flag-Smasher's right arm.

Flag-Smasher is killed alongside a group of ULTIMATUM forces after attacking Deadpool.

=== LMD ===
A new version of Flag-Smasher and iteration of ULTIMATUM announce their presence to the world by crashing a gala held in honor of Tom Herald, a conservative senator from Texas. Attaching time bombs to Herald and six others, Flag-Smasher attempts to coerce two versions of Captain America, Steve Rogers and Sam Wilson, into joining him, before arming both the explosives and "data bombs" that will leak the NSA's surveillance data, decrypt America's nuclear launch codes, and erase the country's electronic banking sanctions and its No Fly List. The digital bombs and three of the physical ones are disarmed by Rick Jones, but Flag-Smasher and his minions escape after Wilson fails to stop them from shooting Herald.

=== Grant Rogers ===
After Grant Rogers' identity as Captain Krakoa is exposed, he adopts the Flag-Smasher mantle for himself.

== Powers and abilities ==
The Flag-Smasher is a skilled hand-to-hand combatant with proficiency in the martial art of shotokan karate-do. He is also a skilled terrorist strategist, and speaks English, French, German, Russian, Italian, Japanese, and Esperanto.

ULTIMATUM personnel have supplied him with a number of weapons and other devices, including a flame-throwing pistol, a teargas gun, a spiked mace, a shield, jet-propelled skis used for flight, teleportation devices, submarines, and rocket-propelled hovercraft.

== Other versions ==
- An alternate universe version of Karl Morgenthau from Earth-138 called Captain Anarchy appears in Edge of Spider-Geddon #1. This version is an ally of Spider-Punk who sports an outfit similar to Captain America's, wields an unbreakable shield, and is empowered by a Super-Insurgent Serum.
- In Earth-8311, the home universe of Spider-Ham, Karl Morgenthau's counterpart is Pug-Smasher (Karl Snortenthau), a humanoid Pug. After being displaced to Earth-616, Pug-Smasher joins X-Force.

== In other media ==
- A group called the Flag Smashers appears in The Falcon and the Winter Soldier, led by a gender-flipped version of Karl Morgenthau named Karli Morgenthau (portrayed by Erin Kellyman).
- Flag-Smasher appears in Marvel's Deadpool VR, voiced by Jeff Fahey.
