= The Star-Spangled Man =

- The Falcon and the Winter Soldier episode
- The second of several art posters released for the series, with art by Salvador Anguiano
- Episode no.: Episode 2
- Directed by: Kari Skogland
- Written by: Michael Kastelein
- Cinematography by: P.J. Dillon
- Editing by: Jeffrey Ford; Todd Desrosiers
- Original release date: March 26, 2021
- Running time: 50 minutes

Cast
- Clé Bennett as Lemar Hoskins / Battlestar; Carl Lumbly as Isaiah Bradley; Desmond Chiam as Dovich; Dani Deetee as Gigi; Indya Bussey as DeeDee; Renes Rivera as Lennox; Tyler Dean Flores as Diego; Ness Bautista as Matias; Amy Aquino as Dr. Christina Raynor; Elijah Richardson as Eli Bradley; Noah Mills as Nico; Gabrielle Byndloss as Olivia Walker; Mike Ray as Alonso Barber; Neal Kodinsky as Rudy; Sara Haines as herself

Episode chronology
← Previous "New World Order"	Next → "Power Broker"

"The Star-Spangled Man" is the second episode of the American television miniseries The Falcon and the Winter Soldier, based on Marvel Comics featuring the characters Sam Wilson / Falcon and Bucky Barnes / Winter Soldier. It follows the pair as they reluctantly work together to track an anti-nationalist organization, the Flag Smashers. The episode is set in the Marvel Cinematic Universe (MCU), sharing continuity with the films of the franchise. It was written by Michael Kastelein and directed by Kari Skogland.

Anthony Mackie and Sebastian Stan reprise their respective roles as Sam Wilson and Bucky Barnes from the film series, with Wyatt Russell, Erin Kellyman, Danny Ramirez, and Daniel Brühl also starring. Development began by October 2018, and Skogland joined in May 2019. The episode gives a full introduction to the series' new version of Captain America, John Walker (Russell), with a Good Morning America interview and a drumline rendition of Alan Menken's song "Star Spangled Man" from the MCU film Captain America: The First Avenger (2011). It also introduces Isaiah Bradley (guest star Carl Lumbly), a veteran super soldier who was imprisoned and experimented on by the United States government and Hydra for 30 years. Filming took place at Pinewood Atlanta Studios in Atlanta, Georgia, with location filming in the Atlanta metropolitan area and in Prague.

"The Star-Spangled Man" was released on the streaming service Disney+ on March 26, 2021. Viewership for the series was estimated to have been higher than the previous week, and the episode was well received by critics who praised its racial commentary and dialogue, the chemistry between Mackie and Stan, and the introduction of Bradley.

== Plot ==
John Walker appears on Good Morning America to discuss becoming Captain America and his desire to live up to Steve Rogers's legacy. A disappointed Bucky Barnes confronts Sam Wilson about his decision to hand Captain America's shield to the United States government. He joins Wilson in searching for the Flag Smashers terrorist group.

Wilson and Barnes travel to Munich and find the Flag Smashers smuggling medicine. Wilson identifies a possible hostage, who is revealed to be the group's leader, Karli Morgenthau. With their enhanced abilities, the Flag Smashers quickly overpower Barnes and Wilson until Walker and Lemar Hoskins come to their aid. The Flag Smashers escape. Walker and Hoskins request Barnes and Wilson join them in aiding the Global Repatriation Council (GRC) to quash the ongoing violent post-Blip revolutions, but they refuse. Meanwhile, Morgenthau receives a threatening text from the mysterious Power Broker.

Traveling to Baltimore, Barnes introduces Wilson to Isaiah Bradley, a veteran super soldier who fought Barnes in 1951, during the Korean War. Bradley refuses to help them uncover information about a new Super Soldier Serum due to being imprisoned and experimented on by the U.S. government and Hydra for 30 years. As the two argue over Barnes keeping the existence of an African-American super-soldier a secret, Wilson is harassed by police and Barnes is arrested for missing a therapy appointment. Barnes is released on bail after Walker and Hoskins intervene. Barnes and Wilson are forced into a therapy session with Barnes's therapist Dr. Raynor.

Barnes and Wilson again refuse to work with Walker and Hoskins, and Walker warns the duo to stay out of their way. In Slovakia, the Flag Smashers escape while one member stays behind to hold off the Power Broker's men. Barnes and Wilson decide to visit an imprisoned Helmut Zemo in Berlin to gather intelligence on the Flag Smashers.

== Production ==
=== Development ===
By October 2018, Marvel Studios was developing a limited series starring Anthony Mackie's Sam Wilson / Falcon and Sebastian Stan's Bucky Barnes / Winter Soldier from the Marvel Cinematic Universe (MCU) films. Malcolm Spellman was hired as head writer of the series, which was announced as The Falcon and the Winter Soldier in April 2019. Spellman modeled the series after buddy films that deal with race, such as 48 Hrs. (1982), The Defiant Ones (1958), Lethal Weapon (1987), and Rush Hour (1998). Kari Skogland was hired to direct the miniseries a month later, and executive produced alongside Spellman and Marvel Studios' Kevin Feige, Louis D'Esposito, Victoria Alonso, and Nate Moore. The second episode was written by Michael Kastelein and is titled "The Star-Spangled Man".

=== Writing ===
The opening scene features the new government-chosen Captain America, John Walker, going on a press tour. This was suggested by Feige as a way to humanize the character. Actor Wyatt Russell described Walker as a soldier from a different time period than the first Captain America, Steve Rogers, comparing him to those who served in the Iraq War and War in Afghanistan. He noted that there is a "grey area now" and a different way of fighting due to the influence of technology. He also felt Walker was a company man for the United States military and someone who is willing to do things he is not comfortable doing. He also paralleled Wilson's imposter syndrome regarding the Captain America mantle with Walker's, stating that Walker was a "little bit more of a [jump in] head first type guy" than Wilson. Russell did not read the comics for inspiration.

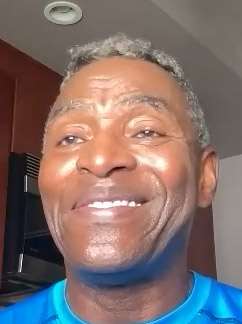
The episode received praise for introducing guest star Carl Lumbly as the character Isaiah Bradley from the comic book Truth: Red, White & Black (2003)

Spellman took inspiration for the series from the comic book Truth: Red, White & Black (2003), which Feige was nervous about adapting because he felt they would not be able to do justice to it and its main character, Isaiah Bradley, if they were only a small part of the series. He changed his mind when he saw how central Bradley was to the series' themes. The character is introduced in this episode and Spellman described him as the soul of the series. He said Bradley's interactions with Wilson would be formative for Wilson's eventual tenure as Captain America.

=== Casting ===
The episode stars Anthony Mackie as Sam Wilson, Sebastian Stan as Bucky Barnes, Wyatt Russell as John Walker / Captain America, Erin Kellyman as Karli Morgenthau, Danny Ramirez as Joaquin Torres, and Daniel Brühl as Helmut Zemo. Also appearing are Clé Bennett as Lemar Hoskins / Battlestar, Carl Lumbly as Isaiah Bradley, Desmond Chiam, Dani Deetté, and Indya Bussey as the Flag Smashers Dovich, Gigi, and DeeDee, respectively, Renes Rivera as Lennox, Tyler Dean Flores as Diego, Ness Bautista as Matias, Amy Aquino as Dr. Christina Raynor, Elijah Richardson as Eli Bradley, Noah Mills as Nico, Gabrielle Byndloss as Olivia Walker, Mike Ray as Alonso Barber, Neal Kodinsky as Rudy, and Good Morning America journalist Sara Haines as herself. Aquino received news of her casting while filming the series Bosch (2014–2021). She did not know about the MCU and was given information and advice on the franchise from her co-star Titus Welliver, who portrayed Felix Blake in the Marvel One-Shots short films and the series Agents of S.H.I.E.L.D. (2013–2020).

=== Filming ===
Filming for the series officially began in November 2019, taking place at Pinewood Atlanta Studios in Atlanta, Georgia, with Skogland directing, and P.J. Dillon serving as cinematographer. Location filming took place in the Atlanta metropolitan area and in Prague. Scenes in Isaiah Bradley's house were filmed in 66 Hogue Street NE in Atlanta, a block away from Martin Luther King Jr.'s birthplace. The series was shot like a film, with Skogland and Dillon filming all of the content at once based on available locations. Most of the second episode's footage was filmed before production was halted due to the COVID-19 pandemic in March 2020.

For the series' first episode, "New World Order", Dillon differentiated the cinematography for Barnes ("cold and austere") and Wilson ("warm and inviting"). For the second episode, Skogland wanted to merge the two cinematography styles now that the characters come together. A comedic scene with the pair early in the episode sees them discuss wizards and the novel The Hobbit (1937). Stan credited this scene to the script and said the committed delivery from him and Mackie made it funny. However, Skogland credited Mackie and Stan's improvisation skills. Another example of this which Skogland gave was a subsequent scene where the pair walk to a plane in silence, staring at each other. She felt this experimental approach had allowed them to develop a "genuine, authentic relationship" between the characters and include ad-libs and humor naturally.

Skogland said the therapy scene between Barnes and Wilson allowed the characters to show their vulnerabilities, convey how Barnes's mind is "this type of jail cell he's in", and explore their shared grief over losing Rogers. Aquino added that Dr. Raynor's "soldier to soldier" conversations with the pair allowed them to explore themes about acknowledging and resolving trauma. She took inspiration from therapists she had both met with and portrayed throughout her career, and cited detective Mitzi Roberts as her biggest influence in portraying Dr. Raynor. Aquino said the therapy scene was largely improvised by Mackie and Stan, and it took around 4 to 5 takes to film the humorous moment in which Wilson and Barnes's legs are interlocked. For a central action sequence that takes place on moving trucks, Skogland wanted to contrast Wilson and Barnes's incompatibility with Walker and Hoskins being a "well-oiled machine". She also emphasized Wilson's attempts to get through to Morgenthau. Action and stunts for the sequence were filmed practically, primarily by the second unit.

=== Visual effects ===
Eric Leven served as the visual effects supervisor for The Falcon and the Winter Soldier, with the episode's visual effects created by Digital Frontier FX, Tippett Studio, Rodeo FX, QPPE, Cantina Creative, Technicolor VFX, and Trixter. Rodeo FX was tasked with working on the truck action sequence, delivering approximately 180 shots for it. After realizing that the background plate footage from Atlanta and separate blue screen footage was insufficient for the sequence, the team began rendering elaborate digital environments for the scene. Because the sequence is set in Munich, Germany, the team augmented the plate footage with German trees and mountains, using Google Maps and Google Earth for reference. Rodeo also created a five-mile-long (eight-kilometer-long) digital highway that the trucks could drive on. This allowed them to easily change positions during filming or use different plate shots, as the team wanted to show different areas in successive shots of the sequence. They rendered the highway moving at 120 kilometers per second, rather than the trucks moving, as it was easier for the camera to align all the elements and ensure details like stones, dirt, and smoke could be inserted. Rodeo computer-generated imagery (CGI) supervisor Loïc Beguel created a method for the team to track the position of the trucks across the digital highway during edits, making editorial updates easier. In some shots they used digital doubles of the trucks, and a fully digital interior of one of the trucks was created for the moment where Barnes confronts Morgenthau, with digital vaccine crates replacing cardboard boxes from the original reference footage. Shots in the sequence also featured digital doubles of the actors, particularly during close-ups of Falcon and when modifying footage of stunt doubles became difficult. Rodeo visual effects supervisor Sébastien Francoeur said a digital double was present for around 95 percent of shots featuring Barnes's Winter Soldier arm.

=== Music ===
The episode opens with a drumline rendition of the song "Star Spangled Man", which was written by Alan Menken for the MCU film Captain America: The First Avenger (2011). Series composer Henry Jackman described this rendition as a parody, and attributed it to Skogland and the series' music supervisor. The drumline rendition of the song was included, along with selections from Jackman's score for the episode, on the series' Vol. 1 soundtrack album. This was released digitally by Marvel Music and Hollywood Records on April 9, 2021.

== Marketing ==
On March 19, 2021, Marvel announced a series of posters that were created by various artists to correspond with the episodes of the series. The posters were released weekly ahead of each episode, with the second poster, designed by Salvador Anguiano, being revealed on March 22. After the episode's release, Marvel announced merchandise inspired by the episode as part of its weekly "Marvel Must Haves" promotion for each episode of the series, including apparel, accessories, and collectibles which included a Funko Pop and Marvel Legends figure of Walker and a Hot Toys Winter Soldier figure.

== Release ==
"The Star-Spangled Man" was released on Disney+ on March 26, 2021. The episode, along with the rest of The Falcon and the Winter Soldier, was released on Ultra HD Blu-ray and Blu-ray on April 30, 2024.

== Reception ==
=== Viewership ===
Nielsen Media Research, which measures the number of minutes watched by United States audiences on television sets, listed The Falcon and the Winter Soldier as the most-watched original series across streaming services for the week of March 22 to 28, 2021. Between the first two episodes, which were available at the time, the series had 628 million minutes viewed, which was a 27% gain over the previous week.

=== Critical response ===
The review aggregator website Rotten Tomatoes reported a 100% approval rating with an average score of 8.1/10 based on 37 reviews. The site's critical consensus reads, "New political intrigue and a healthy dose of emotional stakes are great, but what really makes 'The Star-Spangled Man' sing is the return of Anthony Mackie and Sebastian Stan's delightfully antagonistic chemistry."

Sulagna Misra of The A.V. Club was amazed how the series was "leading us to how Sam can become Captain America. It's clear that it's not a problem of nerve or intelligence or compassion. It's that Sam feels there is no easy way to go into the role without feeling like an imposter—or even worse, being treated as one." She was relieved that Wilson was an emotionally intelligent main character, and enjoyed the banter between him and Barnes. Misra also felt Lumbly was able to convey a lot in his short scene, and gave the episode an "A". Den of Geek's Gavin Jasper felt the series found its footing in this episode and was "walking into an interesting conflict. As our heroes reluctantly work together, they're sandwiched between a country that mistreats them and a group of terrorists who want to do away with the systems that mistreat our heroes." Jasper called the scene with Isaiah Bradley a memorable, though somber, moment of the episode. He gave the episode 4.5 out of 5 stars. Giving the episode a "B", Christian Holub of Entertainment Weekly believed it was a good choice to explore Walker in the opening of the episode and praised the scene with Isaiah Bradley. Holub enjoyed seeing the Flag Smashers expand upon the idea that there were some benefits to the Blip and compared the group to the Red Lotus from the animated series The Legend of Korra. Speaking to the episode's main set piece, Holub said it was less impressive than the first episode's opening action sequence, but made up for its smaller scale by adding more characters to the fight. He was also excited by the continued teasing of the Young Avengers forming in the MCU, as seen in other MCU films and television series, with the appearance of Eli Bradley who becomes Patriot in the comics.

Feeling "The Star-Spangled Man" dove "headfirst into its story" with the episode giving more time to the Flag Smashers and John Walker after the first episode was "highly character-focused", IGN's Matt Purslow said the episode was "another dense, chewy episode, marred only by an odd approach to Sam and Bucky's antagonistic [quippy] dialogue" which he found irritating rather than funny. Purslow said the main action sequence's focus on super soldiers tied it into the Captain America mythology that that rest of the series is centered on, and he spoke highly of the scene with Isaiah Bradley. He felt that scene was a huge moment for Wilson and said it was "a good sign that the writing team intends to continue exploring the issue in a serious way that is smartly woven into the larger-than-life world of superheroes". He gave the episode an 8 out of 10. Alan Sepinwall at Rolling Stone said the episode was "even busier" than the previous one, but found it to be more satisfying given Wilson and Barnes share scenes which "significantly boosts the energy level of the show and injects some badly-needed humor". Wilson and Barnes's counseling session was one of the highlights for Sepinwall along with the various running gags throughout, though he did criticize the episode's set piece which he felt was repetitive and had questionable visual effects.
