= 20th Visual Effects Society Awards =

US film and TV awards ceremony in 2022

20th Visual Effects Society Awards

March 8, 2022

Outstanding Visual Effects in a Photoreal Feature:
Dune

Outstanding Visual Effects in a Photoreal Episode:
Foundation - The Emperor's Peace

The 20th Visual Effects Society Awards was an awards ceremony held by the Visual Effects Society. Nominations were announced on January 18, 2022, and the ceremony took place on March 8, 2022.

== Nominees ==
=== Honorary Awards ===
Lifetime Achievement Award:

- Lynwen Brennan

VES Award for Creative Excellence

- Guillermo del Toro

=== Film ===
Outstanding Visual Effects in a Photoreal Feature	Outstanding Supporting Visual Effects in a Photoreal Feature
Dune – Paul Lambert, Brice Parker, Tristan Myles, Brian Connor, Gerd Nefzer: Godzilla vs. Kong – John "D.J." Des Jardin, Tamara Kent, Bryan Hirota, Kevin Smith, Mike Meinardus; The Matrix Resurrections – Dan Glass, Nina Fallon, Tom Debenham, Huw J Evans, James Schwalm; No Time to Die – Charlie Noble, Mara Bryan, Joel Green, Jonathan Fawkner, Chris Courbold; Shang-Chi and the Legend of the Ten Rings – Christopher Townsend, Damien Carr, Joe Farrell, Sean Walker, Dan Oliver; Spider-Man: No Way Home – Kelly Port, Julia Neighly, Chris Waegner, Scott Edelstein, Dan Sudick	Last Night in Soho – Tom Proctor, Gavin Gregory, Julian Gnass, Fabricio Baessa: Candyman – Andrew Zink, James McQuaide, Josh Simmonds, Drew Dir, Ryan Evans; Nightmare Alley – Dennis Berardi, Ryan MacDuff, Mark Hammond, David Roby, Geoff Hill; The Last Duel – Gary Brozenich, Helen Judd, Jessica Norman, Yann Blondel, Stefano Pepin; The Tragedy of Macbeth – Alex Lemke, Michael Huber, Michael Ralla, Benedikt Laubenthal
Outstanding Visual Effects in an Animated Feature	Outstanding Animated Character in a Photoreal Feature
Encanto – Scott Kersavage, Bradford Simonsen, Thaddeus P. Miller, Ian Gooding: Luca – Enrico Casarosa, Andrea Warren, David Ryu, Jon Reisch; Raya and the Last Dragon – Kyle Odermatt, Osnat Shurer, Kelsey Hurley, Paul Felix; Sing 2 – Patrick Delage, Nathalie Vancauwenberghe, Christophe Lourdelet, Boris Jacq; The Mitchells vs. the Machines – Alan Hawkins, Carey A. Smith, Mike Lasker, Nicola Lavender	Finch: Jeff – Harinarayan Rajeev, Matthias Schoenegger, Simon Allen, Paul Nelson: Flora & Ulysses: Ulysses – Pierre-Loïc Hamon, Sachin Tyagi, Nandini Nambiar, Loïc Mireault; Jungle Cruise: Aguirre – Alexander Lee, Claus Pedersen, Rasely Ma, Gary Wu; Venom: Let There Be Carnage: Carnage – Richard Spriggs, Ricardo Silva, Lucas Cuenca, Federico Frassinelli
Outstanding Animated Character in an Animated Feature	Outstanding Created Environment in a Photoreal Feature
Encanto: Mirabel Madrigal – Kelly McClanahan, Sergi Caballer, Mary Twohig, Jose Luis "Weecho" Velasquez: Luca: Luca – Gwendelyn Enderoglu, Laurie Nguyen Kim, Tanja Krampfert, Maria Lee; Raya and the Last Dragon: Tuk Tuk – Brian Menz, Punn Wiantrakoon, Erik Hansen, Vicky YuTzu Lin; The Mitchells vs. the Machines: Katie Mitchell – Lindsey Olivares, Kurt Judson, Soh-I Jeong, Rohini Kumar	Spider-Man: No Way Home: The Mirror Dimension – Eric Le Dieu de Ville, Thomas Dotheij, Ryan Olliffe, Claire Le Teuff: Dune: Arrakeen City – Rhys Salcombe, Seungjin Woo, Jeremie Touzery, Marc Austin; Jungle Cruise: Waterfall Canyon – Mark McNicholl, Frédéric Valleur, Hamish Beachman, Mark Wainwright; The Suicide Squad: Valle Del Marre – Nick Cattell, Jason Desjarlais, Matt Fitzgerald, Jerome Moo
Outstanding Created Environment in an Animated Feature	Outstanding Virtual Cinematography in a CG Project
Encanto: Antonio's Room – Camille Andre, Andrew Finley, Chris Patrick O'Connell, Amol Sathe: Luca: Portorosso Piazza – Airton Dittz, Jr., Jack Hattori, Michael Rutter, Joshua West; Raya and the Last Dragon: Talon – Mingjue Helen Chen, Chaiwon Kim, Virgilio John Aquino, Diana Jiang LeVangie; Sing 2: Crystal Theater – Ludovic Ramière, Théo Rivoalen, Henri Deruer, Frédéric Mainil; Vivo: Mambo Cabana – Bertrand Bry-Marfaing, Josef Dylan Swift, Geeta Basantani, Jeremy Kim	Encanto: We Don't Talk about Bruno – Nathan Detroit Warner, Dorian Bustamante, Tyler Kupferer, Michael Woodside: Godzilla vs. Kong: Ocean Battle – Shawn Hull, Robert Wiese, Steven Tom, Eric Petey; Loki: "Lamentis"; Race to the Ark – Jesse Lewis-Evans, Luke Avery, Autumn Durald Arkapaw, Scott Inkster; Raya and the Last Dragon – Rob Dressel, Adolph Lusinsky, Paul Felix; Shang-Chi and the Legend of the Ten Rings – Sebastian Trujillo, Louis-Daniel Poulin, Nathan Abbot, Shannon Justison
Outstanding Model in a Photoreal or Animated Project	Outstanding Effects Simulations in a Photoreal Feature
Dune: Royal Ornithopter – Marc Austin, Anna Yamazoe, Michael Chang, Rachael Dunk: Black Widow: The Red Room – Tristan John Connors, Bo Kwon, James Stuart, Ryan Duhaime; Encanto: Casita Madrigal – Jonathan Lin, Chris Patrick O'Connell, Christoffer Pedersen, Alberto Abril; The Suicide Squad: Jotunheim – Simon Dean Morley, Cedric Enriquez Canlas, Layne Howe, Alberto R. S. Hernandez	Dune: Dunes of Arrakis – Gero Grimm, Ivan Larinin, Hideki Okano, Zuny An: Godzilla vs. Kong: Ocean Water & Battle Destruction – Jonathan Freisler, Nahuel Alberto Letizia, Eloi Andaluz Fullà, Saysana Rintharamy; Shang-Chi and the Legend of the Ten Rings: Water, Bubbles & Magic – Simone Riginelli, Claude Schitter, Teck Chee Koi, Arthur Graff; The Suicide Squad: Corto Maltese City Destruction – David R. Davies, Rogier Fransen, Sandy Sutherland, Brandon James Fleet
Outstanding Effects Simulations in an Animated Feature	Outstanding Compositing and Lighting in a Feature
Raya and the Last Dragon – Le Joyce Tong, Henrik Fält, Rattanin Sirinaruemarn, Jacob Rice: Encanto – Francisco Rodriguez, Christopher Hendryx, Brent Burley, David Hutchins; Luca – Amit Baadkar, Greg Gladstone, Emron Grover, Tim Speltz; Sing 2 – Richard Adenot, Guillaume Gay, Frédéric Valz-Gris, Antoine Brémont	Dune: Attack on Arrakeen – Gregory Haas, Francesco Dell'Anna, Abhishek Chaturvedi, Cleve Zhu: Black Widow: Red Room Crashing Back to Earth – Michael Melchiorre, Simon Twine, Daniel Harkness, Tim Crowson; Dune: Hologram and Hunter Seeker – Patrick Heinen, Jacob Maymudes, Tj Burke, James Jooyoung Lee; Shang-Chi and the Legend of the Ten Rings: Macau City – Jeremie Maheu, Mathieu Dupuis, Karthic Ramesh, Jiri Kilevnik; Spider-Man: No Way Home: Liberty Island Battle and Christmas Swing Finale – Zac Campbell, Frida Nerdal, Louis Corr, Kelvin Yee
Outstanding Special (Practical) Effects in a Photoreal or Animated Project	
Jungle Cruise – JD Schwalm, Nick Rand, Robert Spurlock, Nick Byrd: Eternals – Neil Corbould, Keith Corbould, Ray Ferguson, Chris Motjuoadi; The Matrix Resurrections – JD Schwalm, Brendon O'Dell, Michael Kay, Pau Costa Moeller; The Tomorrow War – JD Schwalm, Wayne Rowe, Jim Schwalm, Haukur Karlsson

=== Television ===
Outstanding Visual Effects in a Photoreal Episode	Outstanding Supporting Visual Effects in a Photoreal Episode
Foundation: "The Emperor's Peace" – Chris MacLean, Addie Manis, Mike Enriquez, Chris Keller, Paul Byrne: Loki: "Journey into Mystery" – Dan DeLeeuw, Allison Paul, Sandra Balej, David Seager; Lost in Space: "Trust" – Jabbar Raisani, Terron Pratt, Juri Stanossek, Niklas Jacobson, Paul Benjamin; The Nevers: "Ignition" – Johnny Han, Jack Geist, Justin Mitchell, Emanuel Fuchs, Michael Dawson; The Stand – Jake Braver, Phillip Hoffman, Laurent Hugueniot, Vincent Papaix	See: "Rock-A-Bye" – Chris Wright, Parker Chehak, Javier Roca, Tristan Zerafa, Tony Kenny: 9-1-1: Lone Star: "Hold the Line" – Brigitte Bourque, Tyler Deck, Jason Gottlieb, Josephine Noh, Elia Popov; Squid Game: "VIPS" – Jaihoon Jung, Hyejin Kim, Hyungrok Kim, Sungman Jun; Sweet Tooth: "Sorry About All the Dead People" – Rob Price, Danica Tsang, Matt Bramante, Jayme Vandusen; The Handmaid’s Tale: "Chicago" – Brendan Taylor, Stephen Lebed, Kayla Cabral, Brannek Gaudet; The Mysterious Benedict Society: "A Bunch of Smart Orphans" – Philippe Thibault, Marie-Pierre Boucher, Alexis Belanger, Gabriel Beauvais
Outstanding Visual Effects in a Commercial	Outstanding Animated Character in an Episode or Real-Time Project
Sheba "Hope Reef" – Grant Walker, Sophie Harrison, Hernan Llano, Michael Baker: Far Cry 6 "Chicharrón Run" – Niklas Ström, Kajsa Kurtén, Nicklas Andersson, Adrian Tsang; Lego "Rebuild the World" – Fabian Frank, Anandi Peiris, Kiril Mirkov, Platon Filimonov; Lexus "Parking Spot" – Alex Thomas, Andrew McLintock, JD Yepes, Clement Renaudin; Zillow "The Journey" – Ben Kwok, Ashley Goodwin, Oliver Varteressian, Yebin Ahn, Tom Bussell	The Witcher: Nivellen the Cursed Man – Marko Chulev, Rasely Ma, Mike Beaulieu, Robin Witzsche: Lisey’s Story: The Long Boy – Mohsen Mousavi, Salauddin "Sallu" Kazi, Mattias Brunosson, Pablovsky Ramos-Nieves; Love, Death & Robots: "Snow in the Desert"; Hirald – Maxime Luere, Zoé Pelegrin-Bomel, Laura Guerreiro, Florent Duport; The Witcher: Leshy Eskel; Tree Branch Creature – Hannes Faupel, Stéphane Paccolat, Ivan Cadena Ayala, Laurent Fortin; Y: The Last Man: Ampersand – Mike Beaulieu, Michael Dharney, Peter Pi, Aidana Sakhvaliyeva
Outstanding Animated Character in a Commercial	Outstanding Created Environment in an Episode, Commercial, or Real-Time Project
Smart Energy: "Einstein Knows Best"; Einstein – Alex Hammond, Harsh Borah, Clare Williams, Andreas Graichen: Avanti West Coast: "Feel Good Travel"; Terri – Tom Raynor, Chloe Dawe, Suvi Jokiniemi, Alex Doyle; Far Cry 6: Chicharrón – Elin Laven, Gustav Ahren, Anton Stattin, Simon Decombel; France Télévision: Sumo – Geoffroy Barbet-Massin, Vincent Venchiarutti, Antoine Antin, Mathias Lachal; ING: "Do Your Thing"; Roary the Lion – Chris Welsby, Clementine Supiot, Kiril Mirkov, Arnau Gilabert	Sheba: Hope Reef – Henrique Campanha, Baptiste Roy, Luca Veronese, Timothee Maron: Foundation: Trantor Cityscape – Samuel Simanjuntak, Melaina Mace, Benjamin Ruiz, Alessandro Vastalegna; Hawkeye: "Echoes"; Manhattan Bridge – Nicholas Hodgson, David Abbott, Nick Cattell, Jin Choi; Hawkeye: "So This Is Christmas?": Rockefeller Center – John O'Connell, Tiffany Yung, Orion Terry, Ho Kyung Ahn
Outstanding Effects Simulations in an Episode, Commercial, or Real-Time Project	Outstanding Compositing and Lighting in an Episode
Foundation: Collapse of the Galactic Empire – Giovanni Casadei, Mikel Zuloaga, Steven Moor, Louis Manjarres: Loki: "Journey into Mystery"; Alioth Cloud – George Kuruvilla, Menno Dijkstra, Matthew Hanger, Jiyong Shin; The Nevers – David Stopford, Michele Stocco, Mike Hsu, Justin Mitchell; WandaVision: Vision's Destruction – Sylvain Nouveau, Hakim Harrouche, Omar Meradi, Laurent Meste	Loki: "Lamentis"; Shuroo City Destruction – Paul Chapman, Tom Truscott, Biagio Figliuzzi, Attila Szalma: The Falcon and the Winter Soldier: "New World Order" – Nathan Abbot, Beck Veitch, Markus Reithoffer, James Aldous; WandaVision: Goodbye, Vision – David Zaretti, Bimpe Alliu, Michael Duong, Mark Pascoe; WandaVision: The Hex – Charles Labbé, Xavier Fourmond, Reuben Barkataki, Vanessa Delarosbil
Outstanding Compositing and Lighting in a Commercial	
Verizon "The Reset" – David Piombino, Rajesh Kaushik, Manideep Sanisetty, Tim Crean: Toyota "Never Stop" – Michael Ralla, Alejandro Villabon, Alexander Osvaldsson, Paul Krist; Toyota "Upstream" – JD Yepes, Paul Krist, Carlos Adarraga Gomez, Minsang Lee; Zillow "The Journey" – Ben Kwok, Yebin Ahn, Robert Bruce, Tuna Unalan

=== Other categories ===
Outstanding Visual Effects in a Real-Time Project	Outstanding Visual Effects in a Special Venue Project
Call of Duty: Vanguard – Sandy Lin-Chiang, Joseph Knox, Gareth Richards, Shane Daley: Battlefield 2042 – Anders Egleus, Jeremy Chubb, Gray Horsfield, Sean Ellis; Forza Horizon 5 – Don Arceta, Valentyn Minytskyi, Conar Cross, George Ilenei; Ratchet & Clank: Rift Apart – Grant Hollis, Yancy Young, Steven Russell, Sean Applegate; Returnal – Harry Krueger, Tony Salkovuo, Risto Jankkila, Sharman Jagadeesan	Jurassic World Adventure – Eugénie von Tunzelmann, Maximilian McNair MacEwan, Stephen Goalby, Brad Silby: Hôtel de la Marine – Franck Lambertz, Hugues Allart, Olivier Jarry, Pierre Jury
Outstanding Visual Effects in a Student Project	
Green – Camille Poiriez, Arielle Cohen, Eloise Thibaut, Louis Florean: Le Souffleur de Rêves – Lea Desrozier, Paul Denis, Gregoire Hoarau, Lisa Ripper; Neoshin Episode 01: Cold Blood – Sebastian Selg, Ramon Schauer, Jiayan Chen, Bea Hoeller; Relativity – Hugo Astesano, Loïc Ciaux, Guillaume Hulot, Loïc Remy
