= Visual Effects Society Award for Outstanding Compositing & Lighting in an Episode =

Annual US television award

The Visual Effects Society Award for Outstanding Compositing in a Photoreal Episode is one of the annual awards given by the Visual Effects Society, starting in 2003. It is awarded to visual effects artists for their work in compositing. It has gone through several title changes over the years; from 2003 to 2012, the category included commercials in the category, before refocusing in 2013, specifically nominating television programs.

== Winners and nominees ==
=== 2000s ===
Year	Program/Commercial	Episode(s)	Nominees	Network
2002	Best Compositing in a Televised Program, Music Video, or Commercial			
2002	Dinotopia		Christian Manz, Pedro Sabrosa, Nicolas Cotta, Tor-Bjorn Olsson	ABC
2002	Firefly	"SerenityMarooned/Making Good"	Loni Peristere, Emile Edwin Smith, Kristen Branan, Chris John Jones	Fox
2002	Adidas: Mechanical Legs		Eric Barba, Bernd Angerer, Jeff Julian, Feli di Giorgio	
2003	Smallville	"Accelerate"	Eli Jarra, Ivan DeWolf, Brian Harding	The WB
2003	Angels in America		Stefano Trivelli	HBO
2003	Battlestar Galactica		Patti Gannon, Chris Jones, Sean Apple, Jarrod Davis	Sci Fi
2004	Outstanding Compositing in a Broadcast Program			
2004	Space Odyssey: Voyage to the Planets		George Roper, Christian Manz, Sirio Quintavalle, Pedro Sabrosa	Discovery Channel
2004	The Librarian: Quest for the Spear (Himalayan Pass Sequence)		Greg Groenekamp, Joel Merritt, Mamie McCall	TNT
2004	Smallville	"Crisis" (Clark Kent Stops a Bullet Sequence)	John Han, Eli Jarra, Noriaki Matsumoto, Terry Shigemitsu	The WB
2005	Outstanding Compositing in a Broadcast Program, Commercial, or Music Video			
2005	Empire		Stefano Trivelli, Michele Moen, Kelly Bumbarger, Sean Wilson	ABC
2005	Into the West	"Wheel to the Stars"	Jared Jones, Jason Korber, Geeta Basantani, Ryan Dutour	TNT
2005	Mezzo Djarum		Robert Nederhorst, Marc Rienzo, Feliciano di Giorgio, Maciek Sokalski	
2006	Travelers: Snowball		Laure Lacroix, Lyse Beck, Steve McGillen, Matt Holland	
2006	Battlestar Galactica	"Resurrection Ship, Part 2"	Lane Jolly, Don Kim, Matt Smith, Chris Zapara	Sci Fi
2006	Coke: The Greatest Gift		Murray Butler, MaryAnne Lauric, Nathan Hughes, Pedro Sabrosa	
2006	ESPN: Sports Heaven		Geoff McAuliffe, Yafei Wu, Robert Sethi, Jimi Simmons	
2007	Nike: Leave Nothing		James Allen, Rob Trent	
2007	Levi's: Change		Tim Davies, Jason Schugardt, Yuichiro Yamashito	
2007	Smallville	"Bizarro" (Flood)	David Alexander, Kaz Yoshida, Geeta Basantani, Tony White	The CW
2007	Smallville	"Justice"	Rob Reinhart, Jake Matsumoto, Takashi Takeoka, Christina Spring	The CW
2007	Tin Man	"Into the Storm"	Todd Thibault, Philippe Thibault, Lionel Lim, Annabelle Kent	Sci Fi
2008	Outstanding Compositing in a Broadcast Program or Commercial			
2008	John Adams	"Join or Die" (Boston Harbor)	Paul Graff, Joshua LaCross, Matt Collorafice	HBO
2008	Coke: It's Mine (Balloons)		Angus Kneale, Dan Williams, Andrew Proctor	
2008	FedEx: PIGEON (Pigeon)		Andy Walker, Spencer Lueders, Maryane Butler, Murray Butler	
2008	Toshiba: Time Sculpture		Richard de Carterert, Paul Downes, Oliver Dadswell, John Price	
2009	CSI: Crime Scene Investigation	"Family Affair" (Opening Shot)	Derek Smith, Christina Spring, Steve Meyer, Zach Zaubi	CBS
2009	Kerry Lowlow: Mouse (Overall)		Jake Mengers, Stephen Newbold, Kelly Bruce, Greg Howe-Davies	
2009	Pepsi: The Flight of the Penguin		Murray Butler, Ben Cronin, Andy Rowan-Robinson, Miyuki Shimamoto	
2009	Porsche: Family Tree		Tim Davies, Jeff Willette, Zach Tucker	

=== 2010s ===
Year	Program/Commercial	Episode(s)	Nominees	Network
2010	The Pacific	"Peleliu Landing"	Jeremy Nelson, John P. Mesa, Dan Novy, Tyler Cote	HBO
2010	Boardwalk Empire	"Boardwalk Empire"	Paul Graff, Brian Sales, Jesse Siglow, Merysa Nichols	HBO
2010	Drench: Cubehead		Matthew Unwin, Lisa Ryan, Michael Gregory	
2010	Travelers: Watering Hole		Franck Lamberts, Ryan Kowles	
2011	Boardwalk Empire	"Gimcrack & Bunkum"	Anton Dawson, Eran Dinur, Austin Meyers, David Reynolds	HBO
2011	Any World: Jeep: Call of Duty: MW3		Jason Bergman, Rodrigo Dorsch, Steve Meyer, Peter Sidoriak	
2011	Channel 4: Street Summer		Stirling Archibald, Anthony Bloor, Michael Gregory, Giacomo Mineo	
2011	DirecTV: Hot House		Franck Lambertz	
2012	Outstanding Compositing in a Broadcast Program			
2012	Game of Thrones	"Valar Morghulis" (White Walker Army)	Falk Boje, Esther Engel, Alexey Kuchinsky, Klaus Wuchta	HBO
2012	Hell on Wheels	"Blood Moon"	Antonio Chang, Jason Fotter, Eric Hayden, Josh Miyaji	AMC
2012	Hemingway & Gellhorn		Nathan Abbot, Shelley Campbell, Chris Morley, Christopher Paizis	HBO
2012	Last Resort	"Captain"	Matt Von Brock, Jason Fotter, Aldo Ruggiero, Brian Williams	ABC
2013	Game of Thrones	"The Climb"	Kirk Brillon, Steve Gordon, Geoff Sayer, Winston Lee	HBO
2013	Banshee	"Pilot"	Gevork Babityan, Andranik Taranyan, Matt Kelly, Matthieu Perin	Cinemax
2013	Game of Thrones	"The Rains of Castamere" (The Conquering of Yunkai)	Sean Faden, Greg Szafranski, Florian Friedmann, Travis Nobles	HBO
2013	Vikings	"Dispossessed"	Ovidiu Cinazan, Gary Couto, Marco Lee, Maria Gordon	History
2014	Outstanding Compositing in a Photoreal/Live Action Broadcast Program			
2014	Game of Thrones	"The Watchers on the Wall"	Dan Breckwoldt, Martin Furman, Sophie Marfleet, Eric Andrusyszyn	HBO
2014	American Horror Story: Freak Show	"Edward Mordrake, Part 2"	Tommy Tran, JV Pike, Rob Lutz, Matt Lefferts	FX
2014	Game of Thrones (Wight Attack)		Keegan Douglas, Okan Ataman, Brian Fortune, David Lopez	HBO
2014	The Knick (Abigail's Nose)		Vance Miller, Aaron Raff, John Bair, Rebecca Dunn	Cinemax
2014	Vikings	"Invasion"	Ovidiu Cinazan, Gary Couto, Doug Cook, Angel Li	History
2015	Outstanding Compositing in a Photoreal Episode			
2015	Game of Thrones	"Hardhome"	Eduardo Diaz, Guillermo Orbe, Oscar Perea, Inmaculada Nadela	HBO
2015	Game of Thrones	"The Dance of Dragons" (Drogon Arena)	Dmitry Ovcharenko, Igor Klimovsky, Egor Borschevsky, Vladimir Mikheyenko	HBO
2015	Game of Thrones	"The House of Black and White" (Drogon Lair)	Travis Nobles, Mark Spindler, Max Riess, Nadja Ding	HBO
2015	Vikings	"To the Gates"	Ovidiu Cinazan, Olivia Yapp, Greg Lamar, Meng Angel Li	History
2016	Game of Thrones	"Battle of the Bastards" (Retaking Winterfell)	Dominic Hellier, Morgan Jones, Thijs Noij, Caleb Thompson	HBO
2016	Black Sails	"XX." (Sailing Ships)	Michael Melchiorre, Kevin Bouchez, Heather Hoyland, John Brennick	Starz
2016	Game of Thrones	"Battle of the Bastards" (Meereen City)	Thomas Montminy-Brodeur, Patrick David, Michael Crane, Joe Salazar	HBO
2016	Game of Thrones	"The Door" (Beyond the Wall)	Eduardo Diaz, Anibal Del Busto, Angel Rico, Sonsoles Lopez-Aranguren	HBO
2017	Game of Thrones	"The Spoils of War" (Loot Train Attack)	Dom Hellier, Thijs Noij, Edwin Holdsworth, Giacomo Matteucci	HBO
2017	Game of Thrones	"Beyond the Wall" (Frozen Lake)	Mark Kolpack, Sabrina Arnold, David Rey, Kevin Yuille, Gary D'Amico	HBO
2017	Game of Thrones	"Eastwatch"	Oscar Perea, Santiago Martos, David Esteve, Michael Crane	HBO
2017	Star Trek: Discovery		Phil Prates, Rex Alerta, John Dinh, Karen Cheng	CBS All Access
2018	Lost in Space	"Diamonds in the Sky" (Crash Site Rescue)	David Wahlberg, Douglas Roshamn, Sofie Ljunggren, Fredrik Lönn	Netflix
2018	Altered Carbon		Jean-François Leroux, Reece Sanders, Stephen Bennett, Laraib Atta	Netflix
2018	The Handmaid's Tale	"June"	Winston Lee, Gwen Zhang, Xi Luo, Kevin Quatman	Hulu
2018	Silicon Valley	"Artificial Emotional Intelligence" (Fiona)	Tim Carras, Michael Eng, Shiying Li, Bill Parker	HBO
2019	Game of Thrones	"The Long Night" (Dragon Ground Battle)	Mark Richardson, Darren Christie, Nathan Abbott, Owen Longstaff	HBO
2019	Game of Thrones	"The Bells"	Sean Heuston, Scott Joseph, James Elster, Corinne Teo	HBO
2019	Stranger Things	"Chapter Eight: The Battle of Starcourt" (Starcourt Mall Battle)	Simon Lehembre, Andrew Kowbell, Karim El-Masry, Miklos Mesterhazy	Netflix
2019	Watchmen	"It's Summer and We're Running Out of Ice" (Looking Glass)	Nathaniel Larouche, Iyi Tubi, Perunika Yorgova, Mitchell Beaton	HBO

=== 2020s ===
Year	Program	Episode(s)	Nominees	Network
2020	Lovecraft Country	"Strange Case" (Chrysalis)	Viktor Andersson, Linus Lindblom, Mattias Sandelius, Crawford Reilly	HBO
2020	The Mandalorian	"Chapter 9: The Marshal"	Nicolas Caillier, Simon Rafin, Siang Kee Poh, Simon Marinof	Disney+
2020	The Mandalorian	"Chapter 10: The Passenger"	TC Harrison, Tami Carter, Jaume Creus Costabella, Shane Davidson	Disney+
2020	The Mandalorian	"Chapter 15: The Believer"	Peter Demarest, Christopher Balog, Shawn Mason, David Wahlberg	Disney+
2021	Outstanding Compositing & Lighting in an Episode			
2021	Loki	"Lamentis" ("Shuroo City Destruction")	Paul Chapman, Tom Truscott, Biagio Figliuzzi, Attila Szalma	Disney+
2021	The Falcon and the Winter Soldier	"New World Order"	Nathan Abbot, Beck Veitch, Markus Reithoffer, James Aldous	Disney+
2021	WandaVision	"Previously On" ("The Hex")	Charles Labbé, Xavier Fourmond, Reuben Barkataki, Vanessa Delarosbil	Disney+
2021	WandaVision	"The Series Finale" (Goodbye, Vision)	David Zaretti, Bimpe Alliu, Michael Duong, Mark Pascoe	Disney+
2022
2022	Love, Death and Robots	"Night of the Mini Dead"	Tim Emeis, José Maximiano, Renaud Tissandié, Nacere Guerouaf	Netflix
2022	House of the Dragon	"The Black Queen" ("Dance of Dragons")	Kevin Friederichs, Sean Raffel, Florian Franke, Andreas Steinlein	HBO
2022	The Book of Boba Fett	"From the Desert Comes a Stranger"	Peter Demarest, Tami Carter, Brandon McNaughton, Sirak Ghebremusse	Disney+
2022	The Lord of the Rings: The Rings of Power	"Udûn" (Tirharad Cavalry Charge)	Sornalingam P, Ian Copeland, Nessa Mingfang Zhang, Yuvaraj S	Amazon Prime Video

== Programs with multiple awards ==
7 awards

- Game of Thrones (HBO)

== Programs with multiple nominations ==
16 nominations

- Game of Thrones (HBO)

4 nominations

- Smallville (The WB/CW)

3 nominations

- The Mandalorian (Disney+)
- Vikings (History)

2 nominations

- Battlestar Galactica (ABC)
- Boardwalk Empire (HBO)
- WandaVision (Disney+)
