= The Falcon and the Winter Soldier =

2021 Marvel Studios television miniseries

- Also known as: Captain America and the Winter Soldier
- Genre: Action-adventure; Buddy comedy; Science fiction; Superhero
- Created by: Malcolm Spellman
- Based on: Marvel Comics
- Directed by: Kari Skogland
- Starring: Sebastian Stan; Anthony Mackie; Wyatt Russell; Erin Kellyman; Danny Ramirez; Georges St-Pierre; Adepero Oduye; Don Cheadle; Daniel Brühl; Emily VanCamp; Florence Kasumba; Julia Louis-Dreyfus
- Music by: Henry Jackman
- Country of origin: United States
- Original language: English
- No. of seasons: 1
- No. of episodes: 6

Production
- Executive producers: Kevin Feige; Louis D'Esposito; Victoria Alonso; Nate Moore; Kari Skogland; Malcolm Spellman
- Producers: Ariella Blejer; Dawn Kamoche
- Production locations: Atlanta, Georgia; Czech Republic
- Cinematography: P.J. Dillon
- Editors: Jeffrey Ford; Kelley Dixon; Todd Desrosiers; Rosanne Tan
- Running time: 50–61 minutes
- Production company: Marvel Studios
- Budget: $150 million

Original release
- Network: Disney+
- Release: March 19 – April 23, 2021

Related
- Captain America: Brave New World; Marvel Cinematic Universe television series

The Falcon and the Winter Soldier (Note: The series is titled Captain America and the Winter Soldier at the end of the sixth episode.) is an American television miniseries created by Malcolm Spellman for the streaming service Disney+, based on Marvel Comics featuring the characters Sam Wilson / Falcon and Bucky Barnes / Winter Soldier. It is the second television series in the Marvel Cinematic Universe (MCU) produced by Marvel Studios, sharing continuity with the films of the franchise, and is set six months after Sam Wilson was handed the mantle of Captain America in the film Avengers: Endgame (2019). Wilson teams up with Bucky Barnes to stop anti-patriots who believe the world was better during the Blip. Spellman served as head writer for the series, which was directed by Kari Skogland.

Sebastian Stan and Anthony Mackie reprise their respective roles as Barnes and Wilson from the film series, with Wyatt Russell, Erin Kellyman, Danny Ramirez, Georges St-Pierre, Adepero Oduye, Don Cheadle, Daniel Brühl, Emily VanCamp, Florence Kasumba, and Julia Louis-Dreyfus also starring. By September 2018, Marvel Studios was developing several limited series for Disney+ centered on supporting characters from the MCU films, such as Wilson and Barnes. Spellman was hired in October and chose to focus on the racial and political issues raised by Wilson, a Black man, being handed Captain America's shield at the end of Endgame. The Falcon and the Winter Soldier was announced in April 2019, when Stan and Mackie were confirmed to be starring. Skogland was hired to direct the next month. Filming began in October 2019 in Atlanta, Georgia, before moving to the Czech Republic in March 2020. Production was halted due to the COVID-19 pandemic, but it resumed in Atlanta in September before wrapping in the Czech Republic in October.

The Falcon and the Winter Soldier premiered on March 19, 2021, and ran for six episodes until April 23. It is part of Phase Four of the MCU. The series received positive reviews, with critics highlighting Stan and Mackie's chemistry and the series' social commentary but criticizing its pacing. It received several accolades, including five Primetime Emmy Award nominations. A feature film, Captain America: Brave New World (2025), continues Wilson's story from the series.

== Premise ==
Six months after being handed the mantle of Captain America at the end of Avengers: Endgame (2019), Sam Wilson teams up with Bucky Barnes on a global mission to stop an anti-patriotism group, the Flag Smashers, who are enhanced with a recreation of the Super Soldier Serum and believe the world was better during the Blip.

== Cast and characters ==
- Sebastian Stan as Bucky Barnes / Winter Soldier:
  An enhanced soldier and the best friend of Steve Rogers / Captain America during the 1940s. Presumed killed in action during World War II, he reemerged in the present day as a brainwashed assassin. His programming was later removed, and the character is now having an identity crisis. Head writer Malcolm Spellman noted that Barnes has done "nothing but fight" in the last 100 years, and the series could not avoid the trauma that he has gone through. Stan explained that Barnes would be struggling with his murderous past while also adjusting to life in the 21st century without Rogers, following the end of the film Avengers: Endgame (2019). Co-executive producer Zoie Nagelhout explained that Barnes would be working to "unburden himself" from his life as the Winter Soldier but the darker side of the character would still be seen during the series.
- Anthony Mackie as Sam Wilson / Falcon / Captain America:
  An Avenger and a former pararescueman who was trained by the military in aerial combat using a specially designed wing pack. Wilson was handed Captain America's shield by Rogers at the end of Endgame, and the series expands on this moment to explore the implications of a Black man being given that mantle. Wilson initially continues to use only the Falcon moniker in the series, and Mackie said the story would portray the shield as being a burden for the character. He added that Wilson is questioning how "a Black man [can] represent a country that does not represent him". Wilson eventually takes up the shield to become the new Captain America. Mackie was hesitant about the series, feeling that it would not match the quality of the MCU films and not wanting a Black actor to lead Marvel's first failure, but he was won over by the scripts.
- Wyatt Russell as John Walker / Captain America / U.S. Agent:
  A decorated Captain of the U.S. Army Rangers, and the new Captain America chosen by the U.S. government. He attempts to join Wilson and Barnes in their fight, and believes he is a better embodiment of American values than Rogers was. After being stripped of the Captain America title, Walker is given the moniker U.S. Agent by Valentina Allegra de Fontaine. Spellman described Walker as a soldier who has "done everything his country has ever asked" and is now faced with a reality where his life and sense of duty to the United States "challenge [him] in a way that upsets and obliterates [his] privilege". Russell added that Walker was a "company man" who might venture into "the grey areas" to complete the mission. He had room to shape the character since this is his introduction to the MCU. Spellman said Walker was inspired by the comic book character, who uses the moniker U.S. Agent, but the series had shifted away from the comic book portrayal to add some different dimensions. Executive producer Kevin Feige added that a White man, Russell, was specifically cast as the new Captain America as commentary on how the U.S. government would not want a Black man like Wilson to take on that role.
- Erin Kellyman as Karli Morgenthau:
  The leader of the anti-patriotism group the Flag Smashers, who are enhanced with a recreation of the Super Soldier Serum and believe the world was better during the Blip, fighting for open national borders. Spellman called Morgenthau "the glue for the series". Flag-Smasher in the comics is an identity assumed by male characters, notably Karl Morgenthau. Kellyman felt it was important the character was gender-swapped for the series, giving young women a character they could "look up to and relate to now". She added since Karli is not a middle-aged man like Karl, Karli's outlook on life and actions she takes come from a different perspective.
- Danny Ramirez as Joaquin Torres:
  A first lieutenant in the U.S. Air Force who serves as Wilson's support staff and is investigating the Flag Smashers. Director Kari Skogland called Torres "a bit of a puppy dog" who is a fan of the Falcon and enjoys getting to work alongside him.
- Georges St-Pierre as Georges Batroc: A mercenary who is the leader of the criminal group LAF.
- Adepero Oduye as Sarah Wilson:
  Sam's sister who runs the Wilson family fishing business in Louisiana. Sarah represents Sam's life growing up in the South and was included in the series to have strong opinions and play a part in Sam's choice to take up the mantle of Captain America. Oduye felt the siblings' relationship was the heart of the series. She looked to the little comic book history her character has as well as her backstory in the series' scripts.
- Don Cheadle as James "Rhodey" Rhodes:
  An officer in the U.S. Air Force and Avenger. Skogland explained that Rhodes plays a mentor role for Wilson in the series, giving him reasons for and against taking up the mantle of Captain America while also providing a view of the wider world following the Blip.
- Daniel Brühl as Helmut Zemo:
  A Sokovian baron who was responsible for breaking up the Avengers in the film Captain America: Civil War (2016). The series introduces Zemo's traditional purple mask from the comics, which Brühl was enthusiastic about wearing; he felt like a baron wearing the updated costume, which points towards the aristocratic Baron Zemo version of the character from the comics. Brühl was thrilled to return to the role and enjoyed the increased sense of humor for the character, adding that the series felt both known and fresh to him compared to Civil War. Skogland was excited to explore Zemo's complexity following the dark place that Civil War left him in, with the series showing that he has lost everything and is paying for his crimes. Spellman said the series would explore Zemo's origin story and show how the character views himself as a hero.
- Emily VanCamp as Sharon Carter / Power Broker:
  A former agent of S.H.I.E.L.D. and the CIA, and Peggy Carter's niece, who has become the criminal leader of Madripoor known as the Power Broker, after being on the run since she was last seen in Civil War. Anthony and Joe Russo and Christopher Markus and Stephen McFeely, the directors and writers of Avengers: Infinity War (2018) and Endgame, had tried to incorporate Carter into those films numerous times but ultimately did not, given the vast number of other characters already featured. When development began on The Falcon and the Winter Soldier, it became the place for Marvel Studios to continue the character's story after Civil War. VanCamp explained that Carter is in a dark place and has a "chip on her shoulder" in the series, and she was interested in exploring these new sides of the character. Nagelhout noted that the character had developed offscreen, and VanCamp said the events between Civil War and the start of the series were implied to have been difficult for Carter by how she is depicted in the series. When VanCamp learned that Carter was the Power Broker, she felt it solidified the version of the character that appears in the series, and called the reveal "very fitting [since] she was hurt and scorned and went rogue". Spellman said the writers chose not to "be fake" by simply saying she had been in hiding since Civil War, and instead wanted to show an evolved version of the character who had responded to being scorned by the intelligence community.
- Florence Kasumba as Ayo: A member of the Dora Milaje, Wakanda's all-female special forces.
- Julia Louis-Dreyfus as Valentina Allegra de Fontaine:
  A contessa who meets with Walker and gives him the moniker U.S. Agent. Executive producer Nate Moore described Fontaine as a funnier but darker version of Nick Fury who has secrets and operates in the "moral gray area", with Feige describing her as being in "recruitment mode".

Recurring members of the Flag Smashers include Desmond Chiam as Dovich, Dani Deetté as Gigi, Indya Bussey as DeeDee, Renes Rivera as Lennox, Tyler Dean Flores as Diego, and Noah Mills as Nico. Also recurring are Amy Aquino as Christina Raynor, Barnes's therapist; Chase River McGee and Aaron Haynes as Sam Wilson's nephews Cass and AJ; Alphie Hyorth as a U.S. senator who is the U.S. representative on the Global Repatriation Council (GRC); Clé Bennett as Lemar Hoskins / Battlestar, a sergeant major in the U.S. Army and Walker's Captain America strike force partner; Carl Lumbly as Isaiah Bradley, an African-American Korean War veteran and super soldier who was imprisoned and experimented on for 30 years; Elijah Richardson as Isaiah's grandson Eli Bradley; and Gabrielle Byndloss as Olivia Walker, John's wife.

Additional guest stars include Ken Takemoto as Yori Nakajima, the father of one of the Winter Soldier's victims; Miki Ishikawa as Leah, a waitress who has a date with Barnes; Ness Bautista as Matias, a member of the Flag Smashers; Neal Kodinsky as Rudy, a supporter of the Flag Smashers; Veronica Falcón as Donya Madani, Morgenthau's adoptive mother; Olli Haaskivi as Wilfred Nagel, the scientist who recreated the Super Soldier Serum; and Nicholas Pryor as Oeznik, Zemo's butler. Janeshia Adams-Ginyard and Zola Williams portray Nomble and Yama, respectively, both members of the Dora Milaje. Other GRC members include Salem Murphy as Lacont, the representative from India; and Jane Rumbaua as Ayla Perez, the representative from the Philippines. Good Morning America correspondent Sara Haines makes a cameo appearance as herself.

== Episodes ==
No.	Title	Directed by	Written by	Original release date
1	"New World Order"	Kari Skogland	Malcolm Spellman	March 19, 2021
Six months after half of all life returned from the Blip, (Note: As a result of the Avengers' actions during the events of the film Avengers: Endgame (2019)) Sam Wilson stops Georges Batroc and the terrorist group LAF, who have hijacked a plane and taken a hostage over Tunisia, with support from U.S. Air Force first lieutenant Joaquin Torres. Wilson, who was given the mantle of Captain America by Steve Rogers, struggles with this idea and decides to give Rogers's shield to the U.S. government for a museum display. Bucky Barnes, who was recently pardoned, attends government-mandated therapy, where he discusses his attempts to make amends for his time as a brainwashed assassin, the Winter Soldier. Torres investigates another terrorist group, the Flag Smashers, who believe life was better during the Blip. Torres is injured by a member of the group with superhuman strength when he witnesses them rob a bank in Switzerland. He later informs Wilson of this, who has been attempting to help his reluctant sister Sarah with the family fishing business in Delacroix, Louisiana. The government soon announces a new Captain America, John Walker.
2	"The Star-Spangled Man"	Kari Skogland	Michael Kastelein	March 26, 2021
Walker appears on Good Morning America and reveals his desire to live up to Rogers's mantle. Barnes tells Wilson that he should have kept the shield before accompanying him to Munich, where the Flag Smashers and their leader Karli Morgenthau are stealing a shipment of medicine. Wilson and Barnes attack the group, but the terrorists are all super soldiers and overpower the pair. Walker and Lemar Hoskins arrive to help, but the Flag Smashers escape. Walker wants to work with Barnes and Wilson, but they refuse. Traveling to Baltimore, Barnes introduces Wilson to Isaiah Bradley, a veteran super soldier who fought the Winter Soldier in 1951, during the Korean War. However, Bradley refuses to help them uncover information about additional super soldiers due to being imprisoned and experimented on by the U.S. government and Hydra for 30 years. Barnes is arrested for missing a therapy appointment, but Walker has him released. Barnes and Wilson again refuse to work with Walker, and Barnes suggests to Wilson that they visit the imprisoned Helmut Zemo.
3	"Power Broker"	Kari Skogland	Derek Kolstad	April 2, 2021
Zemo offers to help stop the Flag Smashers, so Barnes orchestrates a prison riot to help him escape prison. They travel to Madripoor, a criminal sanctuary city-island run by the mysterious Power Broker. High-ranking criminal Selby reveals that the Power Broker hired former Hydra scientist Wilfred Nagel to recreate the Super Soldier Serum. Selby is killed when Wilson's identity is exposed, and every bounty hunter in Madripoor targets Wilson, Barnes, and Zemo. Sharon Carter, who has been living as a fugitive on the island, (Note: As a result of her actions during the events of the film Captain America: Civil War (2016)) saves the trio and directs them to Nagel's lab. They learn that he created twenty doses of the serum, which Morgenthau stole. The bounty hunters attack them, and Zemo kills Nagel in the chaos before finding a getaway vehicle. Carter stays behind and Wilson promises to get her pardoned. The Flag Smashers raid and bomb a Global Repatriation Council (GRC) storage facility in Lithuania while Zemo, Barnes, and Wilson search for them in Latvia. Barnes is confronted by Ayo, a member of Wakanda's Dora Milaje.
4	"The Whole World Is Watching"	Kari Skogland	Derek Kolstad	April 9, 2021
Ayo gives Barnes eight hours to use Zemo before the Wakandans take him, as Zemo killed their king T'Chaka. (Note: As depicted in Captain America: Civil War (2016)) Zemo helps find Morgenthau at a funeral for her adoptive mother, where Walker and Hoskins intercept them. Wilson speaks with Morgenthau alone and attempts to persuade her to end the violence, but an impatient Walker intervenes, and a fight ensues. Zemo destroys most of the serum before he is apprehended by Walker, who secretly takes the last vial. Ayo and the Dora Milaje come for Zemo, but Walker refuses to hand him over. In the ensuing fight, the Dora Milaje humiliate Walker while Zemo escapes. Morgenthau threatens Sarah, forcing Wilson to meet with her to attempt to persuade him to join her. Walker and Hoskins engage other members of the Flag Smashers, leading to another fight in which Morgenthau accidentally kills Hoskins. Enraged by his friend's death and having taken the serum, Walker uses the shield to kill one of the Flag Smashers in front of horrified bystanders, who film his actions.
5	"Truth"	Kari Skogland	Dalan Musson	April 16, 2021
Wilson and Barnes demand the shield from Walker, leading to a fight in which Walker destroys Wilson's wingsuit. Wilson and Barnes take the shield, breaking Walker's arm. Barnes finds Zemo in Sokovia and hands him over to the Dora Milaje, while Walker receives an other than honorable discharge and is stripped of his title as Captain America. Afterward, Walker is approached by Contessa Valentina Allegra de Fontaine. Wilson leaves the damaged wingsuit with Torres and visits Bradley, who states his belief that a Black man cannot, and should not, be Captain America. Wilson returns home and helps fix the family boat, with assistance from several locals and Barnes, who delivers a briefcase from the Wakandans to Wilson. Barnes and Wilson train with the shield and agree to move on from their pasts and work together. The Flag Smashers plan an attack on a GRC conference in New York City and are joined by Batroc, whom Carter has secretly hired. In a mid-credits scene, Walker builds a new shield from scrap metal and his war medals.
6	"One World, One People"	Kari Skogland	Malcolm Spellman & Josef Sawyer	April 23, 2021
Wearing a new Captain America uniform and flight suit from the Wakandans, Wilson flies to New York to stop the Flag Smashers' attack with the help of Barnes, Carter, and Walker. Carter accidentally reveals that she is the Power Broker to Batroc and kills him while Wilson attempts to reason with Morgenthau before Carter kills her as well. Wilson convinces the GRC to postpone the forced relocation of displaced people that Morgenthau died fighting for and instead make efforts to help them. The remaining serum-enhanced Flag Smashers are caught by Barnes and Walker and sent to the Raft, but they are killed by Zemo's butler, Oeznik, en route. De Fontaine gives Walker a new uniform and codename: U.S. Agent. Barnes makes amends with everyone he hurt or enabled as the Winter Soldier while Wilson has a memorial dedicated to Bradley added to the Captain America museum exhibit. In a mid-credits scene, after receiving a full pardon, Carter rejoins the CIA and intends to use this access to sell government secrets and resources.

== Production ==
=== Development ===
By September 2018, Marvel Studios was developing several limited series for its parent company Disney's streaming service, Disney+, to be centered on supporting characters from the Marvel Cinematic Universe (MCU) films who had not starred in their own films. The actors who portrayed the characters in the films were expected to reprise their roles for the limited series. The series were expected to be six to eight episodes each and have a "hefty [budget] rivaling those of a major studio production". The series would be produced by Marvel Studios rather than Marvel Television, which produced previous television series in the MCU. Marvel Studios President Kevin Feige was believed to be taking a "hands-on role" in each series' development, focusing on "continuity of story" with the films and "handling" the actors who would be reprising their roles from the films.

Malcolm Spellman was one of several writers asked to pitch a series focusing on Anthony Mackie's Sam Wilson / Falcon and Sebastian Stan's Bucky Barnes / Winter Soldier. Feige believed the MCU films had not explored these two characters enough, and Marvel Studios especially wanted to explore the pair more after seeing the audience reaction to their "fun dynamic" in the MCU films Captain America: The Winter Soldier (2014) and Captain America: Civil War (2016). Mackie and Stan had both previously expressed interest in starring in an MCU spin-off film together, with Stan comparing the idea to buddy comedy films like Midnight Run (1988) and 48 Hrs. (1982). It was Marvel Studios' intention for the series to use the "buddy two-hander" format like those films. Each writer developed their pitch for the series with a Marvel Studios executive; Spellman worked with Nate Moore, and his pitch focused on race and identity. He gave 48 Hrs., The Defiant Ones (1958), Lethal Weapon (1987), and Rush Hour (1998) as examples of buddy films that dealt with issues of race and which he wanted to model the series after. Spellman had a migraine when he pitched his take to Feige, and he felt that the presentation did not go well. Moore advocated for Spellman and his approach, which the writer felt was because Moore agreed that focusing on race was the right direction for the series. Spellman was hired to write the limited series by the end of October 2018. Feige felt Spellman was the right person for the job because he understood what was needed to make the series fun and action-packed, while also being a Black male television writer which gave him the point of view that was needed to tell the type of story about Wilson that Marvel Studios wanted to tell.

The series was announced in April 2019 as The Falcon and the Winter Soldier. This was the first television series to be developed by Marvel Studios, and Spellman said it was "a bit of a learning curve" for the studio who approached it as a six-hour film. Kari Skogland was hired the next month to direct all six episodes, which are around 45–55 minutes each, with budgets reported to be as much as $25 million. Feige, Louis D'Esposito, Victoria Alonso, Moore, Skogland, and Spellman executive produced the series, which is retitled Captain America and the Winter Soldier in the sixth episode's credits.

=== Writing ===
==== Inception and tone ====
In addition to Spellman, writers for the series include Michael Kastelein, Derek Kolstad, Dalan Musson, and Josef Sawyer; Kolstad joined the series in July 2019, and said he would be bringing "a wink and a nod" to the style of world building and character development from his film franchise John Wick. He felt it was interesting to take secondary characters from the films and put them in primary roles for the series, and added that other characters from earlier MCU films are layered into the series and shift the storytelling in new ways. Some early elements of the series were decided before Spellman was hired, including roles for the characters Helmut Zemo, Valentina Allegra de Fontaine, and Sharon Carter. The latter becomes the Power Broker, which was inspired by a Captain America comic from the 1990s where Carter was exiled from S.H.I.E.L.D. and became "super salty".

Composer Henry Jackman described the series as a psychological drama, while Mackie and Stan said it was "part action-packed superhero epic, part awkward buddy-comedy". Stan compared the series' tone to the more realistic and grounded MCU film Captain America: The Winter Soldier. He added that having a longer running time than a film allowed the series to explore the personal lives of the title characters and show what a day in each of their lives is like. Spellman wanted to "go home" with the characters and let the actors show their skills rather than simply focus on action, and he said the spirit and conflict of the title characters were what remained consistent as the project developed from his initial pitch to the final series. He compared them to fire and ice, saying, "Sam reacts spontaneously from the gut, and Bucky is more cold and calculated". Spellman said there was a "12 second moment in Civil War where it feels like every single Marvel fan knew that [Wilson and Barnes were going to] be able to support a movie or a franchise", referring to a scene in which the two characters bicker over the placement of Wilson's seat. The series builds on the chemistry from that scene. The writers also referenced the various press interviews done by Mackie and Stan to help craft the characters' onscreen dynamic. Skogland and Spellman noted that Wilson and Barnes are not necessarily friends in the films, but they have Steve Rogers as a "common denominator". Without Rogers in the series, the pair's underlying relationship is now "laid bare" and forced to develop. Stan said that without Rogers, Barnes and Wilson went into "opposite corners in terms of facing their lives [and] their demons", but they were each asking the same questions.

==== Setting and themes ====
If you want any honesty to them, you cannot avoid all the trauma that Bucky's been through, and you cannot avoid the fact that Sam is Black.

— Head writer Malcolm Spellman on the central issues facing Bucky Barnes and Sam Wilson in the series

The series is set six months after the film Avengers: Endgame (2019), which depicts Steve Rogers bequeathing his shield and the mantle of Captain America to Wilson. Feige said this was intended to be a "classic passing of the torch from one hero to another", but when Marvel Studios got the opportunity to make television series for Disney+ they decided to expand this into an entire story about Wilson, who is a Black man, becoming Captain America. Mackie elaborated that there was a specific "brand of person" that was expected of Captain America, and Wilson questions whether he should take up the mantle as a Black man who understands how different people see him. Stan said Barnes feels protective of Rogers's legacy, and wants Wilson to become Captain America since he was Rogers's choice. The doubt that Wilson has about taking on the role becomes a conflict for Barnes in the series as well. Regarding Wilson's progression in the series from being reluctant to wield the shield to ultimately using it, Skogland indicated that he needed "to engage in both a public and private conversation of what it means for a Black man to pick up such an iconic historically White symbol" which would help him define what it means to be a hero in modern society versus when Rogers became Captain America in the 1940s. Skogland also believed this was an important progression for the viewers to have along with Wilson since "the shield means different things to different people" and all aspects of it as a symbol needed to be explored.

Feige said the series would be more of a reflection of the real world than previous MCU projects. Spellman felt the series was a nice progression from the themes of racial identity that were presented in Marvel Studios' Black Panther (2018), and was hopeful that the series would have a positive impact on Black youth like that film did. He noted that in addition to himself and Moore, over half of the series' writing staff was also Black which reinforced the series' portrayal of Wilson as a "decidedly Black character". Mackie said he was picking up the mantle left by Black Panther star Chadwick Boseman, who died in August 2020. Once Skogland was hired, however, the racial themes were no longer as central to the series as they had been initially in Spellman's scripts. Other "hard-to-talk about issues" that the series explores, according to Skogland, include ideas of patriotism and extremism, asking the questions: "Who is an American, and who gets to decide what principles the country stands for? What compels people to take extreme actions in the name of what they believe is patriotism?" Skogland noted that Captain America has always been used to explore political ideas, since the character's first comic book in 1941 where he was depicted punching Adolf Hitler. Stan said viewers would be able to compare events in the series to the 2021 storming of the United States Capitol, though this was unintentional since the series was written before that event.

The Blip—where half of all life in the universe disappeared in Avengers: Infinity War (2018) and returned during Endgame—is the primary source of conflict for the series. Spellman said they wanted this crisis to be something viewers could identify with, and compared the Blip to the COVID-19 pandemic since both led to "a world striving for stability after a global catastrophe". Each episode of the series explores whether the Blip will unite or divide the world. The series' primary antagonists, the Flag Smashers, are an anarchist, anti-patriotism group who believe the world was better during the Blip. The role for those characters had been created for the series and then the Flag Smashers name from the comics was chosen as an appropriate match, rather than the writers intentionally adapting the Flag Smashers for the series. The Flag Smashers and Zemo both believe they are heroes and are responding to the Blip with views that others can acknowledge have some valid points. Skogland believed setting the series six months after the Blip was critical, as that is when the complications of everyone returning begin to surpass the initial shock and joy. Co-executive producer Zoie Nagelhout and Moore said the series shows Wilson and Barnes attempting to figure out their identities, and the Blip affects this. Spellman added that identity is one of the main themes of The Falcon and the Winter Soldier, as the story forces Wilson, Barnes, Carter, and Zemo to each "rethink how they see themselves and confront how the world sees them". The series had planned to feature a storyline with Wilson and Barnes working to stop a fast-spreading disease, which had been rumored to be part of the Flag Smashers arc and was believed to have been cut from the series given the similarities to the COVID-19 pandemic; Spellman denied the storyline was removed because of the pandemic similarities.

Spellman created the series using his general knowledge of Marvel Comics and the MCU, along with that of Moore and Nagelhout, rather than basing it on specific comic books, though he did name Truth: Red, White & Black (2003) as a large influence on the series. Moore disliked that comic, but liked the ideas it posed. He felt that Spellman, who strongly advocated for using elements of the comic, had integrated those story elements into the series in a smart way. Feige was nervous about adapting Truth because he felt they would not be able to do justice to it and its main character, Isaiah Bradley, if they were only a small part of the series, but he changed his mind when he saw how central Isaiah was to the series' themes. With the acquisition of 21st Century Fox by Disney allowing Marvel Studios to regain the film rights to the X-Men and Fantastic Four properties, Marvel Studios was able to include elements from those properties in the series. This includes the location Madripoor. Ahead of the series premiere, Spellman said there were three projects from Marvel Studios he knew of that would tie-in to the series.

=== Casting ===
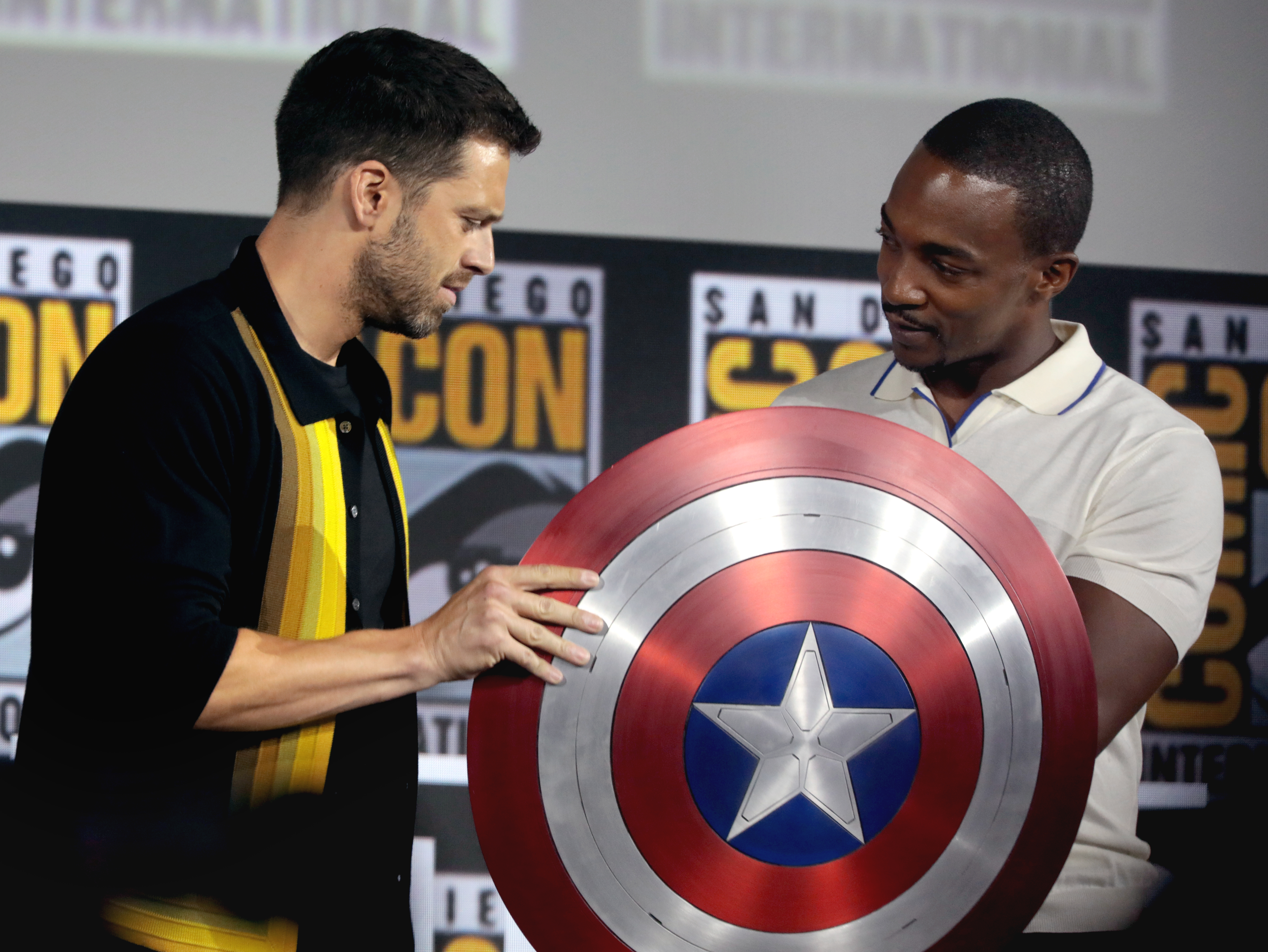
Stan and Mackie at the 2019 San Diego Comic-Con promoting the series

With the official announcement of the series in April 2019 came confirmation that Mackie and Stan would reprise their roles of Wilson and Barnes, respectively, in the series. The next month, Daniel Brühl and Emily VanCamp entered negotiations to reprise their respective film roles of Helmut Zemo and Sharon Carter. Brühl was confirmed for the series in July 2019, and VanCamp was confirmed a month later when Wyatt Russell was announced as cast in the role of John Walker. Russell's past work portraying "the slacker with long hair and a beard" did not lend itself to this role, but Marvel liked how his "unique energy" differentiated Walker from Wilson and Barnes.

Set photos in November 2019 revealed Adepero Oduye would appear in the series, portraying Sam's sister Sarah Wilson, Additional set photos in September 2020 revealed Georges St-Pierre would be reprising his role as Georges Batroc from Captain America: The Winter Soldier, and that Erin Kellyman had joined the cast, portraying Karli Morgenthau. The following month, Danny Ramirez was cast in the "pivotal role" of Joaquin Torres. Kellyman's involvement was confirmed in December. In February 2021, Don Cheadle revealed that he appears in the series in his MCU role of James "Rhodey" Rhodes. Florence Kasumba also reprises her role as Ayo from past MCU films. Julia Louis-Dreyfus was cast as Valentina Allegra de Fontaine. Louis-Dreyfus had been expected to first appear in Black Widow (2021) before delays pushed the film's release to be after the series.

In December 2019, Desmond Chiam and Miki Ishikawa joined the cast, and Noah Mills was cast a month later. In February 2020, Carl Lumbly joined the cast as Isaiah Bradley. A year later, the series' trailer revealed that Amy Aquino was playing Barnes's therapist. Janeshia Adams-Ginyard and Zola Williams reprise their respective MCU roles of Nomble and Yama, members of the Dora Milaje.

=== Design ===
==== Sets and costumes ====
Production designer Ray Chan previously served as supervising art director on many MCU films. Chan and the producers wanted to give the series a "global feel", with a focus on filming on location. The general color palette for the series is dark and muted, with some exceptions: the Blip refugee camps are lighter and washed-out, Madripoor has more saturated colors, and Wilson's home in Louisiana has brighter colors and bolder prints. Costume designer Michael Crow, who also previously worked on several MCU films, extrapolated from Wilson's streetwear looks in the films but added more color and texture to align with the series' brighter Louisiana scenes. For Barnes, Crow was influenced by the classic Americana style and wanted him to have the same "flavor" as Steve Rogers, wearing what someone from the 1940s who is trapped in modern times would wear.

The series' superhero suits were designed by Marvel Studios' design team with input from Crow and the series' costume department. Crow then looked to techniques used to make superhero suits for the films when bringing the new designs to life for the series. Walker's Captain America suit is "more structured, more armored, and darker" than the suits worn by Rogers in the films, with the white sections removed. His U.S. Agent costume from the end of the series is very similar to his Captain America suit, for practicality reasons, but has an updated color scheme based on the comics. In contrast, Wilson's new Captain America suit has a lot of white in it which makes it stand out from the series' general muted look, and provides "a layer of hope and brightness", according to Crow. The suit includes a comic-accurate cowl that Crow knew straight away was going to cause issues for the design team, and would require visual effects to complete. The suit also includes elements that show it was created by Wakandans, including metal wings that Wilson can use as a shield.

Zemo wears a purple mask inspired by the character's balaclava from the comics. The series' version is a structured mask with material over the top. Zemo's coat was intended to feel like an "old Sokovian military uniform", taking inspiration from traditional Slavic clothing and Polish and Russian overcoats from World War II. Fur was added to the coat to keep the costume faithful to the comics. The design team intended for the Flag Smashers' masks to look like they bought cheap masks and painted on their logo themselves. They initially added a fabric layer to the masks for added texture, but felt this was too similar to Zemo's mask. The Flag Smasher's logo was designed by Marvel Studios' design team based on the comics. For the Flag Smashers's clothing, Crow went with minimalist designs so they felt like they were coming from refugee camps.

==== Title sequence ====
External videos
- Marvel Studios' The Falcon and The Winter Soldier End Credits Main On End Title Sequence presents the series' main-on-end title sequence created by Perception, YouTube video from Perception's channel

The series' main-on-end title sequence was created by Perception, who took inspiration from the series' political messages and ideologies. The design features "propaganda plastered across city walls [with] multiple layers of graffiti and flyers put up, torn down, and defaced". Perception used movement and lighting to create a "mysterious ambiance to match the show's atmosphere", and included various hidden messages and Easter eggs in the sequence, such as references to the Enhanced Humans Act and Thaddeus "Thunderbolt" Ross; the Sokovia Accords; Karli Morgenthau via a wanted poster that mentions various attacks by the Flag Smashers; Madripoor and the Brass Monkey Saloon; past attempts to replicate the Captain America program, including Isaiah Bradley being labeled a "subject"; and the Power Broker.

=== Filming ===
Filming began on October 31, 2019, at Pinewood Atlanta Studios in Fayette County, Georgia, under the working title Tag Team. Mackie and Stan announced the official start of filming on November 4. P.J. Dillon was hired as cinematographer at the suggestion of Skogland, who he had worked with on the television series Vikings Marvel Studios had decided early on in development to shoot The Falcon and the Winter Soldier as if it was a film, with one director and cinematographer filming all of the content at once based on available locations. This was in contrast to a more traditional series that would often be broken up into filming blocks by episode and have multiple directors and cinematographers. Dillon said emulating a film with the series' budget and schedule was their biggest challenge, but one that he, Skogland, and the rest of the production embraced. Mackie compared the production to an MCU film, saying it felt like shooting a six-hour film that would then be cut up into individual episodes rather than filming one episode at a time. Feige said the series would have the "cinematic experience" of an MCU film across six episodes, while Skogland felt the series was "relatable" to the films since it featured "action, comedy, [a] high-octane pace, familiar faces, and new characters".

Skogland had plans for her visual approach to the series by the time Dillon was hired, at which point he revisited the MCU films to ensure that he was emersed in their "visual language". To be consistent with the Captain America and Avengers films, they chose to retain the cinematic widescreen format by filming with anamorphic lenses, but they otherwise decided to not limit their visual style to what had been done previously in the franchise. The main camera for the series was Panavision's DXL2 8K camera, with T series Panavision anamorphic prime lenses that Dillon had "de-tuned" to approximate the look of the older Panavision C series from the 1960s and 70s. This meant the lenses were imperfect which, combined with low light and on-set smoke, added texture to the footage. Dillon said Captain America's shield was iconic, and it was important to him that it always be shown clearly and with the correct coloring whenever it was the focus of a shot, so he designed the overall color palette and saturation levels for the series around how the shield looked. Skogland was inspired by the films of David Lean and Midnight Cowboy (1969) for the series, as well as the French film The Intouchables (2011). The Intouchables helped her "feel secure in exploring some of the vulnerabilities" of Wilson and Barnes, which translated to different approaches to filming each character. For example, Skogland's approach to Wilson was having the camera further back to capture his surroundings, while the approach for Barnes was to try "be in his head" by using close-up shots and a shallow focus that excluded the background. She often used photographic references as inspiration for the visual approach to scenes, and wanted the series to have a "slightly raw aesthetic, less perfect than maybe some big budget movie... a little bit edgier and a little bit rougher". Skogland encouraged Mackie and Stan to improvise on set and create a positive environment for the production.

Location shooting took place in the Atlanta metropolitan area from November 2019 through February 2020. Streets and neighborhoods in Atlanta were dressed to represent parts of New York City, Baltimore, Louisiana, and Washington, D.C. Sam's family home in Louisiana was filmed at an abandoned house in Savannah, Georgia, with the interiors built as sets at Pinewood. Their family seafood dock was filmed at the Moon River on Skidaway Island. Filming also occurred at Dobbins Air Reserve Base in Marietta, Georgia, and at Maxwell Air Force Base in Montgomery, Alabama. VanCamp filmed her role simultaneously with the television series The Resident, which was also shot in Atlanta. In mid-January, filming was expected to take place in Arecibo, Puerto Rico, for two weeks, but production on the island was suspended due to a series of earthquakes that took place. On March 3, the production was revealed to be moving to Prague, Czech Republic, for three weeks until March 25, with filming in the city starting on March 6 and expected to continue until the week of March 16. However, filming was halted on March 10 due to the COVID-19 pandemic and members of the production returned to Atlanta. Stan said filming would be completed once it was safe to do so, estimating that there were at least two or three more weeks of filming needed. In early May, the Czech Republic allowed television and film productions to start up if they followed new hygiene guidelines for cast and crew members, and in June the head of the Czech film commission said cast and crew involved in film and television productions would be exempt from the European Union travel ban on U.S. citizens that was set to take effect on July 1.

Production on the series was scheduled to resume at Pinewood Atlanta Studios in August 2020. Dillon returned to his home in Europe when the production shut down and was unable to come back to the U.S. when filming resumed. He was disappointed not to return, but said the majority of filming had been completed before the shut down, and there was already an amount of second unit and additional photography for the series that he did not shoot either which is not unusual for big productions. According to the series' editors, most of the footage from the original filming dates covered the first, second, and fifth episodes, with the third, fourth, and sixth still needing a lot of shooting after the shut down. Skogland said the crew knew exactly what they needed to film once shooting was able to begin again. Filming occurred at Atlantic Station in Atlanta in early September, and VanCamp finished filming her scenes for the series by the end of that month. Filming in Prague resumed by October 10, with locations including Olšany Cemetery and the Monastery of Saint Gabriel in Smíchov. Mackie said the cast and crew followed strict quarantine and social distancing measures while filming in Prague. Production on The Falcon and the Winter Soldier wrapped in Prague on October 23.

=== Post-production ===
Marvel Studios hired editors with television experience to help with the fact that the studio had not made a television series before. Kelley Dixon edited the first and fourth episodes, Todd Desrosiers edited the second and fifth, and Rosanne Tan edited the third and sixth. Desrosiers previously worked with Skogland on the pilot episode of the television series NOS4A2 and Tan was suggested to Skogland by NOS4A2 showrunner Jami O'Brien. Because the series was filmed based on locations rather than episodes, the editors received material out of order and had to work on different episodes at the same time. They also continued to treat the series as a long film and sometimes moved scenes between episodes if that worked better for the overall story. The editors were initially working in Atlanta alongside the rest of the crew, but when the production shut down due to the COVID-19 pandemic they returned to Los Angeles and began working remotely and coordinating over Zoom. Skogland said the crew used their time wisely during the shut down, allowing them to continue with post-production work and make decisions that they usually would not have time to make. When production resumed, there was a reduced schedule for completing editing of the series. Jeffrey Ford was brought on as a supervising editor to work on all six episodes and help the other editors complete their work in time, having previously edited several MCU films including the Captain America and Avengers films. The other editors had already been trying to match Ford's editing style from Captain America: The Winter Soldier. Ford became a mentor for them, helping them get used to the workflow of a Marvel Studios production and its visual effects requirements. Because of the reduced timeframe to complete the series, the recaps that begin each episode were created by Tan's assistant editor, Caroline Wang.

Visual effects were provided by Cantina Creative, Crafty Apes, Digital Frontier FX, Industrial Light & Magic, QPPE, Rodeo FX, Sony Pictures Imageworks, Stereo D, Technicolor VFX, Tippett Studio, Trixter, and Weta Digital.

=== Music ===
Henry Jackman, who scored Captain America: The Winter Soldier and Captain America: Civil War, began scoring the series by December 2020. Because he was returning to the franchise after several years, Jackman started by creating an "audio care package" featuring different themes, orchestrations, and harmonies that he had composed for the Captain America films, to remind himself of that work and organize it before approaching music for the series. Jackman explained that the series format allowed him to write a wider range of music than the films since it still required music for big action sequences while having time for more quiet, character-based moments. He described the music for the latter sequences as being more patient, with "lighter and thinner" instrumentation. The many locations visited in the series also allowed Jackman to explore some environment-specific music, such as elements of the Blues genre when exploring Wilson's backstory in Louisiana, or electronic music for Madripoor which Jackman described as "a grungy rave scenario".

Jackman reprises several of his themes from the films in the series: the composer expanded his Falcon motif from Winter Soldier into a full, classical superhero theme that he combined with some of the Blues elements to acknowledge Wilson's history (the new Falcon theme is used as the series' end credits theme, titled "Louisiana Hero"); Jackman's Winter Soldier theme, which consists of a "scream" and "clangs" that he described as "the last fragments of a human soul trapped inside some mechanistic frame", is heard during callbacks to the character's time as an assassin; Zemo's "spidery, kind of fractious" theme from Civil War returns for that character; and Jackman used an off-key version of his Captain America theme to represent John Walker. Once Walker turns on the titular heroes, Jackman transitioned to the operatic theme that he used for Captain America fighting Iron Man in Civil War due to the similarity between the two situations. The composer wrote a nostalgic motif for Barnes's civilian identity in The Winter Soldier that was tied to the character's 1940s history, but he decided not to use that in the series as he felt it did not suit the modern version of the character. Instead, he took an element from the end of his Winter Soldier theme that is played on strings in a "disturbing" octatonic scale and "straightened [it] out" into a diatonic scale to create a new civilian melody for the character. This is played on strings, piano, and guitar. Jackman's theme for the Flag Smashers has a "dystopian vibe".

Jackman's score was recorded by a 53-player orchestra in Berlin, and was released digitally by Marvel Music and Hollywood Records in two volumes: music from the first three episodes was released on April 9, 2021, and music from the last three episodes was released on April 30. "Louisiana Hero" was released as a single on March 26.

The Falcon and the Winter Soldier: Vol. 1 (Episodes 1–3) [Original Soundtrack]
No.	Title	Music	Length
1.	"Louisiana Hero"		2:14
2.	"Tough Act to Follow"		1:16
3.	"Airborne Operation"		5:56
4.	"Smithsonian Tribute"		0:53
5.	"Nightmares"		1:22
6.	"What Do You Want?"		1:22
7.	"Pluck Up the Nerve"		1:53
8.	"New Agitators"		1:13
9.	"The Wrong Guy"		1:38
10.	"America's Sweetheart"		1:05
11.	"No Parachute"		1:29
12.	"Stakeout"		1:39
13.	"Outmatched"		2:46
14.	"Safe House"		2:41
15.	"Someone You Should Meet"		1:09
16.	"Overlooked For Promotion"		1:20
17.	"Warranted Attention"		1:03
18.	"Fraying Edges"		2:04
19.	"Take One For the Team"		2:21
20.	"Unnecessary Use of Force"		1:48
21.	"Prison Break"		4:41
22.	"A Marriage of Convenience"		0:32
23.	"A Pure Heart"		1:48
24.	"Low Town"		1:24
25.	"Attack, Soldier!"		1:47
26.	"Breaking Character"		2:29
27.	"Bad Science"		3:30
28.	"Masked Man"		1:20
29.	"Dissent and Disillusionment"		1:08
30.	"Radicalized"		1:19
31.	"Star Spangled Man" (featuring The Captain America Drum Corps)	Alan Menken	1:44
Total length:			58:54

The Falcon and the Winter Soldier: Vol. 2 (Episodes 4–6) [Original Soundtrack]
No.	Title	Artist	Length
1.	"Louisiana Hero (Reprise)"		3:22
2.	"You're Free"		1:58
3.	"Master Manipulator"		1:03
4.	"Once More into the Fray"		2:52
5.	"Live Accordingly"		1:51
6.	"Mêlée à Trois"		1:03
7.	"A Losing Battle"		1:04
8.	"Passacaglia"		2:44
9.	"Relieved of Duty"		2:25
10.	"Sokovian Memorial"		1:56
11.	"Isaiah Bradley"		3:41
12.	"Backstory"		1:51
13.	"Real Partners"		1:33
14.	"Home Truths"		2:25
15.	"Opening Gambit"		3:05
16.	"Leading the Charge"		2:41
17.	"Flag Smasher Fight"		1:46
18.	"Fall from Grace"		3:02
19.	"Elegy"		1:53
20.	"Captain America"		3:27
21.	"An Unbalanced Mind"		2:11
22.	"Into the Tunnels"		1:49
23.	"Making Amends"		3:51
24.	"Never Forget"		2:07
25.	"Epilogue"		0:52
26.	"On and On"	Curtis Harding	4:01
Total length:			1:00:33

== Marketing ==
A short teaser for The Falcon and the Winter Soldier was shown at the 2019 San Diego Comic-Con, featuring Brühl as Zemo. The character wears his traditional purple mask from the comics in the teaser. Skogland traveled to Budapest, where Brühl was filming The Alienist: Angel of Darkness, to capture the footage. Concept art for the series featuring designs for the characters' costumes are included in Expanding the Universe, a Marvel Studios special that debuted on Disney+ on November 12, 2019.

In December 2019, Feige debuted the first images from the series at Comic Con Experience, which Matt Goldberg of Collider described as more grounded than fellow Disney+ series WandaVision, with a "standard spy thriller" look similar to the Captain America films. A commercial for the series, WandaVision, and Loki was shown during Super Bowl LIV. Julia Alexander of The Verge said there was not much footage, but it offered "enough glimpses to tease fans". Haleigh Foutch at Collider felt of all the Super Bowl commercials, Marvel's teasers "stole the whole show" and had "a lot to get excited about". A trailer for the series was released during Disney Investor Day in December 2020. Writers for Polygon said the trailer "certainly delivered" and made the series look like it was similar in scope to an MCU film. They highlighted the series' villains which the trailer showcased, Zemo and the Flag-Smashers. Angie Han of Mashable felt the trailer promised "explosive action, a jet-setting plot, some very creepy villains, and—best of all—a return of the characters' odd-couple, best-frenemies dynamic" from Civil War. CinemaBlend's Laura Hurley said the trailer's action was so epic that it could be the trailer for an MCU film rather than a series. Writing for io9, Charles Pulliam-Moore called the trailer "nothing short of bonkers".

A television spot was shown during Super Bowl LV which announced the release of the second trailer for the series. Ben Pearson of /Film said the trailer was a return to the "quippy, action-heavy, Marvel house style" after the release of the less conventional WandaVision. Pearson wondered how this perspective would have been different if The Falcon and the Winter Soldier was released before WandaVision as was originally planned. Ethan Alter at Yahoo! also compared the trailer to WandaVision, saying the series appeared to "bring the fireworks audiences traditionally expect from MCU adventures". Rolling Stone's Brenna Ehrlich called the trailer "replete with explosions, stomach-flipping stunts, and all manner of intrigue". Speaking to Sharon Carter's appearance in the trailer, Ian Cardona of Comic Book Resources felt that even though it was a few seconds, the character was "finally getting the respect she deserves" following her brief appearances in the MCU films. Across various social media platforms, the trailer and television spot had more than 125 million combined views within 24 hours. The trailer became the most-watched for a streaming series, surpassing the 53 million views of the September 2020 WandaVision trailer. It also had 217,000 social media mentions and the highest Google Search volume among all entertainment offerings. Anthony D'Alessandro at Deadline Hollywood noted it was rare for analytics company EDO's top 10 most searched Super Bowl spots list, which measures searches within five minutes of a spot airing, to include a trailer rather than brand ads, but The Falcon and the Winter Soldier's spot was ranked fifth on the list. According to YouTube, the trailer was the sixth most-watched Super Bowl LV ad on the site.

Four episodes of the Disney+ television series Marvel Studios: Legends explore the Falcon, the Winter Soldier, Zemo, and Sharon Carter using footage from their MCU film appearances. The episodes focusing on Falcon and Winter Soldier were released on March 5, 2021, with the Zemo and Sharon Carter episodes released on March 12. Also in March, Xbox released commercials cross-promoting the series with the Xbox Series X and Series S and Xbox Game Pass. The commercials feature Mackie alongside DC Pierson as Aaron, a game store salesman, reprising his role from Captain America: The Winter Soldier where he was an Apple Store employee. Aaron is revealed to be Noobmaster69, the Fortnite player who Thor threatens in Avengers: Endgame. A final trailer for the series was released on March 15. Austen Goslin at Polygon thought it was a good display of the series' story, action, and banter, while Syfy Wire's Matthew Jackson felt it clarified that the series would be a personal fight. He said the trailers had shown that the series could "open up the future for this particular corner" of the MCU. Discussing the final trailer for io9, James Whitbrook highlighted the emphasis on the physical and existential threats to Wilson and Barnes, and was intrigued by the portrayal of Flag-Smasher as a movement rather than a single character. In June 2021, Hyundai Motor Company released a commercial featuring Mackie as Wilson / Captain America promoting The Falcon and the Winter Soldier and the Hyundai Tucson. The commercial was produced by Marvel alongside similar commercials for WandaVision, Loki, and What If...?, and was meant to tell an "in-world" story set within the narrative of the series.

In January 2021, Marvel announced their "Marvel Must Haves" program, which reveals new toys, games, books, apparel, home decor, and other merchandise related to each episode of the series on the Monday following an episode's release. On March 15, general apparel, Funko Pops, collectibles, accessories, and houseware for the series was revealed for the program, with the "Must Haves" merchandise for the episodes starting on March 22 and concluding on April 26. In July, Hasbro unveiled a series-themed version of Monopoly that was set to be released on August 10.

== Release ==
=== Streaming ===
The Falcon and the Winter Soldier debuted on March 19, 2021, on Disney+. Its six episodes were released weekly, concluding on April 23. The series was originally set for release in August 2020, but was pushed back after filming was delayed by the COVID-19 pandemic. This made it the second series released by Marvel Studios, after WandaVision, despite being developed first. It is part of Phase Four of the MCU.

=== Home media ===
The Falcon and the Winter Soldier was released on Ultra HD Blu-ray and Blu-ray by Walt Disney Studios Home Entertainment on April 30, 2024, with SteelBook packaging and concept art cards. Bonus features include the featurette "Cap's Shield"; deleted scenes; a gag reel; and the Marvel Studios: Assembled documentary special "The Making of The Falcon and the Winter Soldier".

The Falcon and the Winter Soldier ranked No. 7 for the week ending May 4, 2024, on the overall disc sales chart. It accounted for 52% of its total sales from Blu-ray.

== Reception ==
=== Viewership ===
Disney+ announced that the first episode, "New World Order", was the most-watched series premiere ever for the streaming service in its opening weekend (March 19 to 22, 2021), ahead of the premieres of WandaVision and the second season of The Mandalorian. Additionally, The Falcon and the Winter Soldier was the most-watched title overall globally for that time period on Disney+, including in the Disney+ Hotstar markets. Samba TV reported that 1.7 million households watched the episode in its opening weekend. TVision determines viewing impressions by counting its 14,000 viewers on connected televisions who have watched at least two minutes of a title within a session of watching content for at least five minutes, across all major U.S. streaming and advertising video on demand services. The company reported that The Falcon and the Winter Soldier was the most-viewed series of April 2021 across measured platforms, being viewed nearly 40 times more than the average series measured by the service. According to the file-sharing news website TorrentFreak, The Falcon and the Winter Soldier was the fourth-most pirated television series of 2021.

=== Critical response ===
The Falcon and the Winter Soldier: Critical reception by episode
Percentage of positive critics' reviews tracked by the website Rotten Tomatoes

The review aggregator website Rotten Tomatoes reported an 84% approval rating with an average rating of 7.25/10, based on 336 reviews. The website's critical consensus reads, "Packed with blockbuster action and deft character beats, Falcon and the Winter Soldier proves itself worthy of Captain America's legacy with its globetrotting intrigue, mature social commentary, and the sparky rapport between stars Anthony Mackie and Sebastian Stan." Metacritic, which uses a weighted average, assigned a score of 74 out of 100 based on 32 critics, indicating "generally favorable" reviews.

The Falcon and the Winter Soldier was praised "for bringing the Black experience to the forefront" through its tackling of issues such as racial discrimination and confronting "the original sins of America building itself on the backs of Black people". David Betancourt, reviewing the season finale for The Washington Post, analyzed the racial themes surrounding the character of Sam Wilson, a Black man, acquiring the mantle of Captain America. Noting that the series was originally planned to debut in 2020, before being delayed by the COVID-19 pandemic, Betancourt believed there was "something eerily timely about a Black Captain America flying in the sky days after the verdict in the murder of George Floyd" and also pointed to Barnes potentially being in a relationship with Leah, an Asian woman, also "at a time when Asian Americans don't feel safe in America because of racist attacks". While these occurrences happening in the series would not "fix anything", Betancourt said "you can't help but feel something when you see it".

Brian Lowry writing for CNN said, "Overall the series deftly accomplished its primary mission, which was to explore the dramatic tension in Wilson becoming Captain America, in a way that went beyond just being told the shield now belonged to him. It also continued to demonstrate Marvel's ability to mount big, muscular action in productions for Disney+, while showcasing the depth of its universe." Calling the series "flawed but fun", Brian Tallerico of Vulture stated that The Falcon and the Winter Soldier "often felt rushed and lacked some depth in its analysis of race and power in this country" but served its purpose as an origin story for Wilson's Captain America while setting up future MCU projects. In terms of how it would be remembered, he felt that it would be "hard to gauge its full impact" until its plot threads were picked up in future MCU projects, as was the case with most MCU entries.

The pacing of the series received some criticism. In his review of the first episode, Alec Bojalad of Den of Geek believed releasing the series' episodes weekly was a detriment overall, since the first episode played as the first act of a larger story and felt "frustratingly incomplete at times" compared to how watching the full series at once would likely feel. This was in contrast to Marvel Studios' first series, WandaVision, which had been "unquestionably an episodic experience" with each episode standing on its own and having episode television-style cliffhanger endings. By the third episode, Alan Sepinwall of Rolling Stone felt the series was "leaning way into the 'six-hour movie' model at this point, where the only concern is advancing the plot by any means necessary, regardless of how interesting it is on its own". He believed compared to WandaVision, which was "very clearly built to be consumed weekly", The Falcon and the Winter Soldier would have been better to view all at once than as weekly episodes. Sepinwall ultimately concluded The Falcon and the Winter Soldier "was trying to do way more than it could comfortably handle", having too many characters and plot threads that writers could not successfully execute fully, with individual episodes that felt "sluggish" despite a lot happening in them, because "those various incidents don't do much beyond inching the plot forward".

Noel Murray said in The New York Times that The Falcon and the Winter Soldier was "largely enjoyable if scattershot" given it "meandered too much, shoehorning in too many side characters and too much Marvel mythology". However, it was still "a rush" to see Wilson "zooming through the air", first as Falcon in the first episode, and then again as Captain America in the sixth episode, which was "even more satisfying". Entertainment Weekly's Darren Franich gave the series a "D", believing there were glimpses of what the series "could have been". He said, "this unmarvelous Disney+ quagmire buried its best instincts underneath uninspired cameos, geopolitical stupidity, and spin-off teases. Creator Malcolm Spellman struggled to keep Sam in the foreground, but the sprawling tale lost focus."

=== Accolades ===
Award	Date(s) of ceremony	Category	Recipient(s)	Result	Ref.
MTV Movie & TV Awards	May 16, 2021	Best Hero	Anthony Mackie	Won	
MTV Movie & TV Awards	May 16, 2021	Best Duo	Anthony Mackie and Sebastian Stan	Won	
Golden Trailer Awards	July 22, 2021	Best BTS/EPK for a TV/Streaming Series (Under 2 Minutes)	"Co-Workers" (ZEALOT)	Nominated	
Black Reel Awards	August 15, 2021	Outstanding Drama Series	Malcolm Spellman	Nominated	
Black Reel Awards	August 15, 2021	Outstanding Actor, Drama Series	Anthony Mackie	Nominated	
Black Reel Awards	August 15, 2021	Outstanding Writing, Drama Series	Malcolm Spellman (for "New World Order")	Nominated	
Black Reel Awards	August 15, 2021	Outstanding Guest Actor, Drama Series	Carl Lumbly	Nominated	
Black Reel Awards	August 15, 2021	Outstanding Guest Actress, Drama Series	Florence Kasumba	Nominated	
Hollywood Critics Association TV Awards	August 29, 2021	Best Actor in a Streaming Series, Drama	Anthony Mackie	Nominated	
Hollywood Critics Association TV Awards	August 29, 2021	Best Supporting Actor in a Streaming Series, Drama	Daniel Brühl	Nominated	
Hollywood Critics Association TV Awards	August 29, 2021	Best Supporting Actor in a Streaming Series, Drama	Wyatt Russell	Nominated	
Primetime Creative Arts Emmy Awards	September 11–12, 2021	Outstanding Guest Actor in a Drama Series	Don Cheadle (for "New World Order")	Nominated	
Primetime Creative Arts Emmy Awards	September 11–12, 2021	Outstanding Sound Editing for a Comedy or Drama Series (One-Hour)	Matthew Wood, Bonnie Wild, James Spencer, Richard Quinn, Steve Slanec, Kimberly Patrick, Teresa Eckton, Frank Rinella, Devon Kelley, Larry Oatfield, Anele Onyekwere, Dan Pinder, Ronni Brown, Andrea Gard (for "One World, One People")	Nominated	
Primetime Creative Arts Emmy Awards	September 11–12, 2021	Outstanding Special Visual Effects in a Season or Movie	Eric Leven, Mike May, John Haley, Daniel Mellitz, Chris Waegner, Charles Tait, Sébastien Francoeur, Chris Morley, Mark LeDoux	Nominated	
Primetime Creative Arts Emmy Awards	September 11–12, 2021	Outstanding Stunt Coordination	Hank Amos, Dave Macomber	Nominated	
Primetime Creative Arts Emmy Awards	September 11–12, 2021	Outstanding Stunt Performance	John Nania, Aaron Toney, Justin Eaton (for "Truth")	Nominated	
Hollywood Professional Association Awards	November 18, 2021	Outstanding Visual Effects – Episodic (Under 13 Episodes) or Non-theatrical Feature	Johannes Bresser, Mark Smith, Alexia Cui, Paul Jenness, Sebastian Bommersheim (for "New World Order")	Nominated	
People's Choice Awards	December 7, 2021	Male TV Star of 2021	Anthony Mackie	Nominated	
People's Choice Awards	December 7, 2021	Sci-Fi Fantasy Show of 2021	The Falcon and the Winter Soldier	Nominated	
NAACP Image Awards	February 26, 2022	Outstanding Writing in a Dramatic Series	Malcolm Spellman (for "New World Order")	Nominated	
Screen Actors Guild Awards	February 27, 2022	Outstanding Performance by a Stunt Ensemble in a Comedy or Drama Series	The Falcon and the Winter Soldier	Nominated	
Visual Effects Society	March 8, 2022	Outstanding Compositing and Lighting in an Episode	Nathan Abbot, Beck Veitch, Markus Reithoffer, James Alduos (for "New World Order")	Nominated	
Critics' Choice Super Awards	March 17, 2022	Best Actor in a Superhero Series	Anthony Mackie	Nominated	
Saturn Awards	October 25, 2022	Best Actor in a Streaming Series	Anthony Mackie	Nominated	

Ahead of the final episode's release, Marvel Studios decided to submit The Falcon and the Winter Soldier in the drama series categories for the Primetime Emmy Awards rather than in the limited series categories. Moore said this decision was made around the series' premiere, with Marvel Studios feeling that the drama categories were appropriate for the series' more "dramatic" content. He added that there had not yet been any consideration for if Stan and Mackie would both be submitted for Outstanding Lead Actors or if one would be submitted for Outstanding Supporting Actor; Mackie and Stan were ultimately both submitted for Outstanding Lead Actor.

== Documentary special ==
In February 2021, the documentary series Marvel Studios: Assembled was announced. The special on this series, "The Making of The Falcon and the Winter Soldier", goes behind the scenes of the series, with Spellman, Skogland, Stan, Mackie, Russell, Kellyman, Cheadle, Brühl, VanCamp, Kasumba, Louis-Dreyfus, and others discussing the importance of racial issues within the narrative, the action scenes, and the impact of the COVID-19 pandemic on the production of the series. The special was released on Disney+ on April 30, 2021, and was included as part of the series' home media release on April 30, 2024.

== Future ==
Before the series premiere, Mackie said there had been no discussions regarding a second season of the series. He was also not sure when he would next appear in an MCU film, especially due to the COVID-19 pandemic's impact on cinemas. Skogland said she was unsure if there would be a second season and felt that she had been able to do everything that she wanted in the first six episodes, but she did say that there were more stories and characters to explore if a second season was made. Feige said there were ideas for what "another one" could be if a second season was made, but Marvel intended for the series to lead into future MCU films first like they did with WandaVision. He added that he did not want to spoil the series by confirming a second season or discussing the plans that Marvel had for the series' characters before the series was fully released. In April 2021, Moore said the end of the series would show story elements for a potential second season, adding that the series explored "evergreen" topics that lent themselves to further exploration, unlike the contained story of WandaVision.

On April 23, 2021, the same day the series' final episode was released, Spellman and series writer Dalan Musson were revealed to be writing the script for a fourth Captain America film that was expected to revolve around Wilson and continue from the events of the series. Nick Romano of Entertainment Weekly believed a second season with the title Captain America and the Winter Soldier had been "inevitable" given the way the series ended. However, knowing the report about the fourth Captain America film added to the intrigue of what direction Marvel Studios would go in, considering past comments from Feige and others implying the series would get a proper second season. Mackie was unaware of any plans for a film or second season, but was "excited to see what happens"; he had signed a deal to star in the film that August. Julius Onah was chosen to direct the film in July 2022, and the film was officially announced later that month at San Diego Comic-Con as Captain America: New World Order. Ramirez and Lumbly reprise their roles in the film, and are joined by Tim Blake Nelson as Samuel Sterns / Leader and Liv Tyler as Betty Ross, both from The Incredible Hulk (2008), and Shira Haas as Sabra. Harrison Ford appears as Thaddeus Ross, replacing original actor William Hurt following his death. In June 2023, the film was retitled Captain America: Brave New World. It was released on February 14, 2025.
