= Site (film) =

2025 film directed by Jason Eric Perlman

- Directed by: Jason Eric Perlman
- Written by: Jason Eric Perlman
- Produced by: Kelly Hayes; Benjamin Cooke; Jason Eric Perlman
- Starring: Jake McLaughlin; Arielle Kebbel; Theo Rossi; Miki Ishikawa
- Cinematography: Eunah Lee
- Edited by: Brian Zweiner
- Music by: Bvdub
- Production company: Entelekey Media
- Distributed by: Blue Fox Entertainment
- Release date: August 8, 2025
- Running time: 105 minutes
- Country: United States
- Language: English

Site is a 2025 sci-fi thriller film directed by Jason Eric Perlman starring Jake McLaughlin, Theo Rossi, Arielle Kebbel, Miki Ishikawa, Yoson An and Danni Wang.

== Premise ==
While working an additional shift at an abandoned government facility, Neil Bardo has nightmarish visions that begin to affect his life.

== Cast ==
- Jake McLaughlin as Neil Bardo
- Theo Rossi as Garrison Vey
- Arielle Kebbel as Elena Bardo
- Miki Ishikawa as Naomi Uchida
- Yoson An as Jian
- Danni Wang as Xifeng
- Carson Minniear as Wiley Bardo
- Corey Jung as Guang
- Hiroshi Otaguro as Ichiro
- Neagheen Homaifar as Aravané Kader
- Kavi Raz as Ronith Nanda
- Vince Foster as Andrew Uchida
- Eric Whitten as Tobin Marris
- Dennis Delamar as Byron
- Michael Harding as Carl
- Gezell Fleming as Dr. Boyce

== Production ==
Jake McLaughlin, Theo Rossi, Miki Ishikawa and Arielle Kebbel were announced as part of the cast in July 2022 while the film was in production in North Carolina.

== Release ==
Blue Fox Entertainment announced the acquisition of global distribution rights in October 2023.

The film received a limited theatrical release on August 8, 2025, followed by a digital release on the same day.

== Reception ==
In his review for Film Threat, Bradley Gibson scored the film an 8 out of 10 writing in his review consensus section: "ambitious" and "compelling."

== See also ==
- List of American films of 2025
- List of thriller films of the 2020s
- List of science fiction films of the 2020s
