= Miki Ishikawa =

American actress and singer (born 1991)

- Born: Miki Michelle Ishikawa; July 29, 1991 (age 35); Denver, Colorado, U.S.
- Occupation: Actress · singer
- Years active: 2005–present

Miki Michelle Ishikawa (born July 29, 1991) is an American actress and singer. She is known for her role as Amy Yoshida on the second season of The Terror, and for being part of the music group T-Squad.

== Career ==
Miki Ishikawa started her career when she signed on to Disney Records as part of the group T-Squad. During this time she had toured with the Jonas Brothers, Miley Cyrus and The Cheetah Girls and was starring on the Nickelodeon series Zoey 101. Since T-Squad's disbandment, she has pursued a solo career.

Miki appeared in several other projects such as Make Your Move where she had a supporting role followed by an Asian drama called Sway. She won the series regular role Amy Yoshida on The Terror; a role that she felt close to. "I identify as second generation, so, in reading for Amy, it felt like we were very similar and I felt very close and connected to the character."

She guest starred as Leah in the Disney+ series The Falcon and the Winter Soldier, which is part of Marvel Cinematic Universe.

== Personal life ==
Miki is a member of the UNICEF Tap Project; raising awareness for those who do not have access to clean water.

== Filmography ==
Film roles
Year	Title	Role	Notes
2005	3 the Hard Way	Madison	Short film
2005	Yours, Mine & Ours	Naoko North	
2009	Funny People	Yo Teach Cast Member	
2013	Make Your Move	Natsumi	
2014	Sway	Grace	
2024	Adult Best Friends	Gwen	
2025	Site	Naomi Uchida	

Television roles
Year	Title	Role	Notes
2005	Zoey 101	Vicky	4 episodes
2008	Lincoln Heights	Rival Ringleader	Episode: "The New Wild Ones"
2009	United States of Tara	Olivia	Episode: "Aftermath"
2009	Yo Teach...!	Miki	Miniseries
2017–19	Hit	Cynthia Chen	Main cast
2018	9-1-1	Stephanie's Coworker	Episode: "Let Go"
2019	The Terror	Amy Yoshida	Series Regular (Season 2)
2019	NCIS: Los Angeles	Jean Chu	Episode: "Provenance"
2021	The Falcon and the Winter Soldier	Leah	2 episodes
2022	NCIS	Molly Stoll	Episode: "The Wake"
