= Erin Kellyman =

British actress (born 1998)

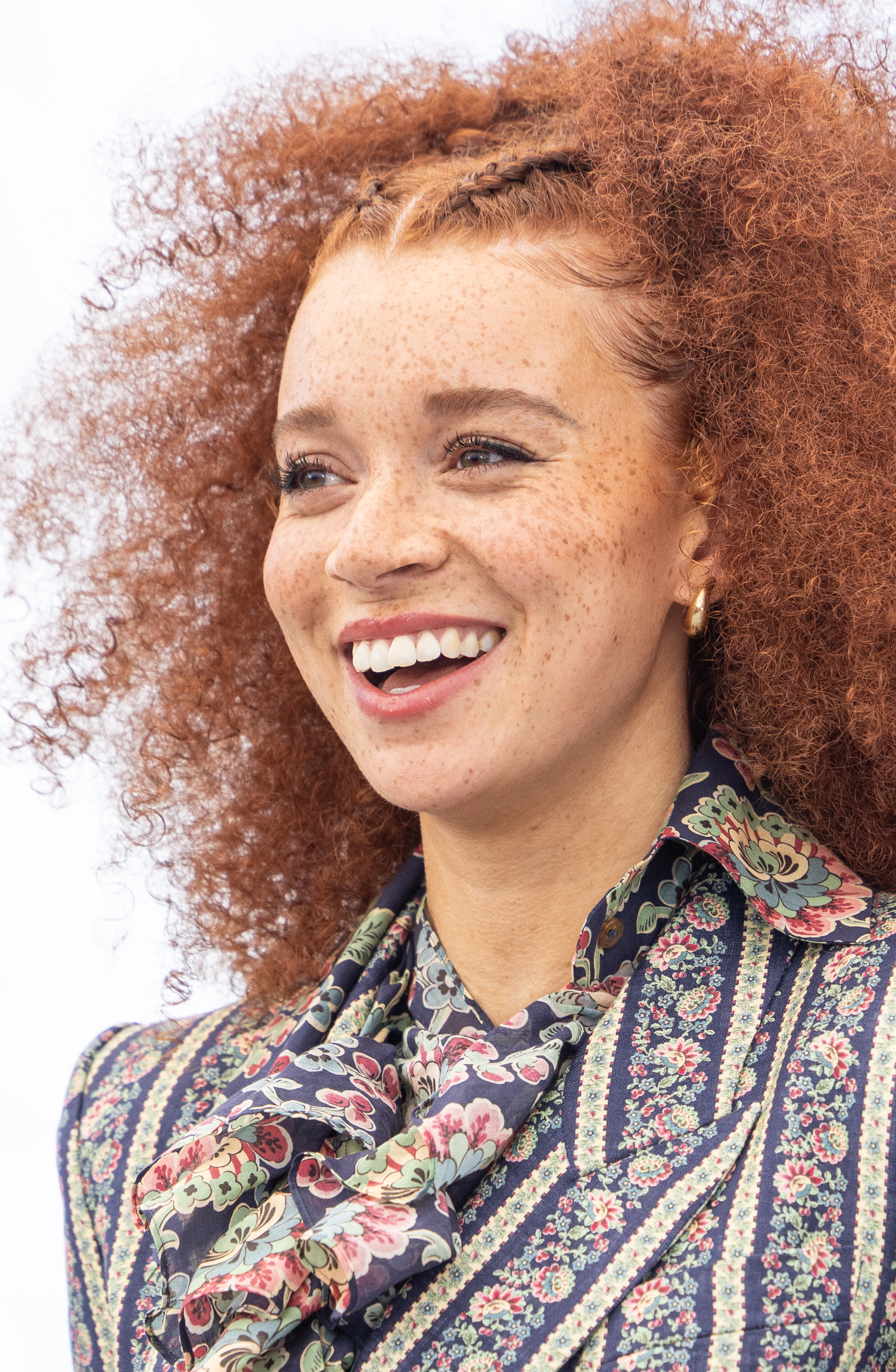
- Kellyman at the 2025 Cannes Film Festival
- Born: Erin Mae Kellyman; 17 October 1998 (age 28); Tamworth, Staffordshire, England
- Occupation: Actress
- Years active: 2015–present

Erin Mae Kellyman (born 17 October 1998) is a British actress. On television, she gained prominence through the Channel 4 sitcom Raised by Wolves (2015–2016) and the BBC series Les Misérables (2018), Don't Forget the Driver (2019), and Life (2020). She has since starred in the Disney+ series The Falcon and the Winter Soldier (2021) and Willow (2022). Her films include Solo: A Star Wars Story (2018), The Green Knight (2021), Blitz (2024), Eleanor the Great (2025) and 28 Years Later: The Bone Temple (2026).

== Early life ==
Erin Kellyman is originally from Tamworth, Staffordshire. She attended Birmingham Ormiston Academy, The Rawlett School and was a graduate of the Nottingham Television Workshop. Erin's mother, Louise, is of Irish ancestry, and her father, Charles, is of Afro-Jamaican descent.

== Career ==
Kellyman appeared in Raised by Wolves, written by Caitlin Moran and her sister Caroline Moran for Channel 4. She also appeared in the 2016 BBC sitcom The Coopers Vs The Rest with Tanya Franks and Kerry Godliman, about a trio of adopted children raised by a suburban couple.

Kellyman was cast as the marauder Enfys Nest in Solo: A Star Wars Story in 2018. The role of Nest in Solo: A Star Wars Story has been reported as the "anti-hero we deserve" and "the most important new character introduced in the movie." This role was reported to have given Kellyman "global recognition". For the role Kellyman had to go through three stages of audition. Kellyman only tested with the lead of the film, Alden Ehrenreich, during the third audition, doing both acting and stunt test work.

Kellyman also appeared in the BBC's adaptation of Les Misérables as Éponine alongside Olivia Colman, Lily Collins, David Oyelowo and Dominic West. Kellyman had originally auditioned for the role of Cosette, but was called back for the role of Éponine. Kellyman praised the diversity in the BBC production, admitting she never considered she would be able to play such a role in a period drama.

Kellyman appeared in BBC Two dark comedy series Don't Forget the Driver, starring Toby Jones. In 2020, Kellyman played the role of Maya, a child that comes to live with her distant aunt, in the BBC TV drama series Life. Kellyman co-stars in the 2021 Disney+ action series The Falcon and the Winter Soldier as Karli Morgenthau, the leader of a radical group called the Flag Smashers, alongside Anthony Mackie and Sebastian Stan. Kellyman starred as knight-in-training Jade in the 2022 Disney+ series Willow; a sequel series to the 1988 film of the same name. The relationship between Jade and fellow series lead Kit, portrayed by Ruby Cruz, makes the series "the first true franchise on Disney Plus to really center a queer story," according to Polygon.

Kellyman plays Jimmy Ink/Kellie in the horror film 28 Years Later (2025) and its sequel 28 Years Later: The Bone Temple (2026). Kellyman plays the role of Madison Flynn, the Thought Leader and head of the Social Media Team in the 2026 BBC comedy series Twenty Twenty Six. For her role in Evening All Afternoon at the Donmar Warehouse she was nominated for Best Performer in a Play at The Stage Debut Awards in September 2026.

== Personal life ==
Kellyman is queer, and spoke of how important her role as Jade from Willow, a lesbian character, was for her.

== Filmography ==
=== Film ===
Key
†	Denotes works that have not yet been released

Year	Title	Role	Director	Notes
2018	Solo: A Star Wars Story	Enfys Nest	Ron Howard	
2021	The Green Knight	Winifred	David Lowery	
2024	Woken	Anna	Alan Friel	
2024	Lilies Not for Me	Nurse Dorothy	Will Seefried	
2024	Blitz	Doris	Steve McQueen	
2025	Eleanor the Great	Nina Davis	Scarlett Johansson	
2025	28 Years Later	Jimmy Ink/Kelly	Danny Boyle	
2026	28 Years Later: The Bone Temple	Jimmy Ink/Kelly	Nia DaCosta	

=== Television ===
Year	Title	Role	Notes
2015–2016	Raised by Wolves	Cathy	Main role, 5 episodes
2017	Uncle	Eleanor	1 episode
2018–2019	Les Misérables	Éponine	Miniseries, 3 episodes
2019	Don't Forget the Driver	Kayla	Main role, 6 episodes
2020	Life	Maya	Miniseries, 6 episodes
2021	The Falcon and the Winter Soldier	Karli Morgenthau	Miniseries, 6 episodes
2021	Marvel Studios: Assembled	Self	1 episode
2022	Top Boy	Pebbles	4 episodes
2022	Willow	Jade	Main role, 8 episodes
2026	Twenty Twenty Six	Madison Flynn	6 episodes
