= Buchanan (surname) =

Buchanan is a surname of Scottish origin (see Clan Buchanan). People with this surname include:

== Academia and science ==
- Alick Buchanan-Smith, Baron Balerno (1898–1984), British academic, soldier and politician
- Allen Buchanan (born 1948), American political scientist and academic
- Andrew Buchanan (surgeon) (1798–1882), Scottish surgeon and academic
- Bill Buchanan (computer scientist) (born 1961), Scottish computer scientist
- Daniel Buchanan (mathematician) (1880–1950), Canadian mathematician
- Francis Buchanan-Hamilton (1762–1829), Scottish surgeon, geographer and naturalist
- George Buchanan (1506–1582), Scottish humanist
- George Wesley Buchanan (1921–2019), American biblical scholar
- Ian Buchanan (philosopher) (born 1969), Australian philosopher
- James M. Buchanan (1919–2013), American Nobel Prize-winning economist
- Janet May Buchanan (1866–1912), Scottish Egyptologist
- John Buchanan (botanist) (1819–1898), Scottish-born botanist active in New Zealand
- Judith Buchanan (born 1967), British scholar of Shakespeare and film
- June Buchanan (1887–1988), American educator
- Mary Buchanan (1885–1959), American mathematician at West Virginia University
- Mark Buchanan (born 1961), American physicist and author
- Robert Earle Buchanan (1883–1973), American bacteriologist
- Scott Buchanan (1895–1968), American educator and philosopher

== Artists and writers ==
- Edna Buchanan (born 1939), American journalist and author
- Evelyne Oughtred Buchanan (1883–1979), British artist
- Robert Williams Buchanan (1841–1901), British poet, dramatist, and novelist
- Rowan Hisayo Buchanan (born 1989), American writer
- Ruth Buchanan (born 1980), contemporary New Zealand artist

== Military ==
- Allen Buchanan (Medal of Honor) (1876–1940), American Medal of Honor recipient
- Archibald Buchanan (RAF officer) (born 1892, date of death unknown), American World War I flying ace with the British RAF
- David M. Buchanan (1862–1936), United States Navy sailor, recipient of the Medal of Honor
- Franklin Buchanan (1800–1874), American Confederate admiral
- Sir James Buchanan, 2nd Baronet (1840–1901), British Royal Navy officer
- Norman Buchanan (1915–2008), Royal Canadian Army officer awarded the Military Cross with two bars, later a furniture retailer and political figure
- Peter Buchanan (Royal Navy officer) (1925–2011), Royal Navy officer who became Naval Secretary
- Robert C. Buchanan (1811–1878), American soldier

== Music ==
- Bill Buchanan (songwriter) (1930–1996), American songwriter
- Chester and Lester Buchanan, country musicians known as the Buchanan Brothers
- Colin Buchanan (musician) (born 1964), Australian singer, entertainer and multi-instrumentalist
- Georgia Buchanan (born 1990), English singer and songwriter
- Keisha Buchanan (born 1984), British-Jamaican singer
- Manley Augustus Buchanan (born 1949), Jamaican musician
- Michael "HouseShoes" Buchanan, American hip hop producer and DJ, who lives and works in Los Angeles
- Paul Buchanan (born 1956), member of the musical group The Blue Nile
- Roy Buchanan (1939–1988), American guitarist
- Walter Buchanan (musician) (1914–1988), American jazz bassist

== Other ==
- John Buchanan (Virginia colonist) (died 1769) Colonial Virginia magistrate, landowner, and soldier
- Alan Buchanan (bishop) (1905–1984), Anglican bishop in Ireland
- Sir Andrew Buchanan, 1st Baronet (1807–1882), British diplomat and baronet
- Archibald C. Buchanan (1890–1979), American lawyer and judge
- Blake Buchanan, founder of Bahama Buck's
- Cheryl Buchanan (born 1955), Aboriginal Australian activist, partner of Lionel Fogarty
- Claudius Buchanan (1766–1815), Scottish divine
- Sir Colin Buchanan (town planner) (1907–2001), British transport expert
- George Buchanan (diplomat) (1854–1924), British ambassador in Russia 1911–1919
- George Buchanan (engineer, born 1790) (died 1852), Scottish civil engineer
- George Buchanan (engineer, born 1865) (died 1940), British civil engineer
- Isaac Buchanan (1810–1883), businessman and political figure in Canada West
- James Buchanan, 1st Baron Woolavington (1849–1935), British businessman and philanthropist
- "Major" John Buchanan (1759–1832), American frontiersman, founder of present-day Nashville, Tennessee
- Mary Beth Buchanan (born 1963), United States Attorney for the Western District of Pennsylvania
- Nathaniel Buchanan (1826–1901), Australian pioneer pastoralist, drover and explorer
- Peter Buchanan (architect) (1942–2023), architect, urbanist, writer, critic, lecturer and exhibition curator
- Peter Buchanan (judge) (1943–2014), Australian jurist
- Scott "pannenkoek2012" Buchanan (born c. 1994), YouTuber specializing in in-depth Super Mario 64 analyses.
- Thomas Boughton Buchanan (1833–1924), Archdeacon of Wilts from 1874 until 1911
- William Buchanan (pastoralist) (1824–1911), Australian pastoralist and gold prospector

== Politics ==
=== USA ===
- Andrew Buchanan (American politician) (1780–1848), member of the U.S. House of Representatives from Pennsylvania
- Arthur S. Buchanan (1856–1919), Associate Justice of the Tennessee Supreme Court
- Bay Buchanan (born 1948), sister to Pat Buchanan, and former Treasurer of the United States
- Edward Buchanan (born 1967), American politician and attorney
- Frank Buchanan (Illinois politician) (1862–1930), Democratic member of the United States House of Representatives from Illinois
- Frank Buchanan (Pennsylvania politician) (1902–1951), Democratic member of the U.S. House of Representatives from Pennsylvania
- Franklin Buchanan (Tennessee politician) (1812–1851), Whig member of the Tennessee House of Representatives
- James Buchanan (1791–1868), 15th president of the United States
- James P. Buchanan (1867–1937), American politician
- Joan Buchanan (born 1952), American politician
- John Buchanan (American politician), Republican presidential candidate in 2004
- John A. Buchanan (1843–1921), American politician and judge
- John Hall Buchanan Jr. (1928–2018), American politician
- John P. Buchanan (1847–1930), Governor of Tennessee
- Pat Buchanan (born 1938), American political commentator and Reform Party presidential nominee in 2000
- Vern Buchanan (born 1951), U.S. Representative from Florida

=== Canada ===
- Alan Buchanan (politician) (born 1952), Canadian university administrator and former politician
- John Buchanan (Canadian politician) (1931–2019), Canadian politician
- William Buchanan (Manitoba politician) (1865–1944), Canadian politician
- William Ashbury Buchanan (1876–1954), Canadian politician and newspaper publisher

=== Scotland ===
- Alick Buchanan-Smith (politician) (1932–1991), Scottish Conservative and Unionist politician
- Cameron Buchanan (politician) (1946–2023), Scottish politician
- George Buchanan (politician) (1890–1955), Scottish politician
- Thomas Ryburn Buchanan (1846–1911), Scottish Liberal politician and bibliophile

=== Other ===
- Andrew Buchanan (New Zealand politician) (1806–1877), member of the New Zealand Legislative Council from 1862 to 1874
- Charles Pakenham Buchanan (1874–1924), Australian business man and mayor of Brisbane
- David Buchanan (politician) (1823–1890), barrister and politician in colonial New South Wales
- Isat Buchanan, Jamaican politician
- Ivan Buchanan (1921–2019), Kittitian politician
- Mike Buchanan (born 1957), British men's rights activist, leader of the Justice for Men and Boys party
- Pam Buchanan (1937–1992), Australian politician
- Thomas Buchanan (1808–1841), second governor of Liberia
- Thomas Buchanan (born 1963), Unionist politician from Northern Ireland

== Sport ==
- Aimee Buchanan (born 1993), American-born Olympic figure skater for Israel
- Archie Buchanan (1928–1983), former association football player
- Barry Buchanan (born 1968), American professional wrestler ("Bull Buchanan")
- Brian Buchanan (born 1973), Major League Baseball outfielder
- Buck Buchanan (1940–1992), American football player
- Cameron Buchanan (footballer) (1928–2008), football player
- David Buchanan (cricketer) (1830–1900), amateur cricketer, notable for spin bowling
- David Buchanan (footballer, born 1962), English professional footballer
- David Buchanan (footballer, born 1986), professional footballer
- David Buchanan (baseball) (born 1989), American professional baseball pitcher for the Philadelphia Phillies
- Henry Buchanan (born 1978), American boxer
- Izett Buchanan (born 1972), American basketball player
- Jack Buchanan (rugby league) (born 1992), Australian Rugby League player
- John Buchanan (sailor) (1884–1943), Scottish Olympic medalist in sailing
- John Buchanan (footballer, born 1935) (died 2009), Scottish footballer
- John Buchanan (footballer, born 1951), Scottish footballer
- Kadeisha Buchanan (born 1995), Canadian soccer player
- Ken Buchanan (1945–2023), Scottish boxer
- Laurence Buchanan (born 1976), English cricketer
- Michael Buchanan (American football) (born 1991), American football defensive end for the New England Patriots
- Mike Buchanan (ice hockey) (1932–2017), Canadian former ice hockey defenceman
- Peter Buchanan (footballer, born 1915) (died 1977), Scottish footballer who played at both professional and international levels
- Peter Buchanan (rugby union) (1889–1957), rugby union player who represented Australia
- Ralph "Bucky" Buchanan (1922–2005), Canadian ice hockey right winger
- Ray Buchanan (born 1971), American football player
- Richard Buchanan (American football) (born 1969), American professional football wide receiver
- Robert Buchanan (footballer) (1868–1909), Scottish international footballer
- Robert Gordon Buchanan (born 1961), retired Major League Baseball pitcher
- Ron Buchanan (born 1944), former Canadian professional ice hockey centre
- Shamari Buchanan (born 1977), American football player
- Shaq Buchanan (born 1997), American basketball player in the Israeli Basketball Premier League
- Tajon Buchanan (born 1999), Canadian soccer/football player
- Teddye Buchanan (born 2002), American football player
- Tim Buchanan (American football) (born 1946), former American football linebacker
- William Buchanan (footballer) (1865–?), Scottish footballer

== Television and film ==
- Buchanan family, one of the main families in the American soap opera One Life to Live
- Colin Buchanan (actor) (born 1966), Scottish actor
- Edgar Buchanan (1903–1979), American actor
- Gordon Buchanan (born 1972), Scottish wildlife film maker
- Ian Buchanan (born 1957), Scottish television actor
- Jack Buchanan (1891–1957), Scottish actor and singer
- Jensen Buchanan (born 1962), American actress
- Lachlan Buchanan (born 1987), Australian actor
- Larry Buchanan (1923–2004), film director, producer and writer
- Luciane Buchanan (born 1993), New Zealand actress
- Neil Buchanan (born 1956), British television presenter
- Neville Buchanan (born 1959), British animator and director
- Simone Buchanan (born 1968), Australian actress
- Stuart Buchanan (1894–1974), American voice actor starring in Snow White and the Seven Dwarfs playing the role of Humbert the Huntsman
- Tanner Buchanan (born 1998), American actor

== Buchanan peerages ==
- Marquess of Graham and Buchanan
- Buchanan baronets, of Dunburgh
- Buchanan baronets, of Lavington

== Fictional characters ==
- John Buchanan, fictional DA from the American crime drama Law & Order: Special Victims Unit
- Pete Buchanan, fictional character from the British soap opera Hollyoaks
- Princess Buchanan, fictional character from the British soap opera Doctors
- Phoenix Buchanan, fictional character from the children's film Paddington 2
- Tom and Daisy Buchanan, fictional characters from the book The Great Gatsby

== See also ==
- Buchanon, surname
- Mitch Buchannon
