= Buchanan =

Buchanan may refer to:

== People ==
- Buchanan (surname)
  - James Buchanan (1791–1868), the 15th president of the United States

== Places ==
=== Antarctica ===
- Buchanan Point, Laurie Island

=== Australia ===
- Buchanan, New South Wales
- Buchanan, Northern Territory, a locality
- Buchanan, South Australia, a locality

=== Canada ===
- Buchanan, Saskatchewan
- Rural Municipality of Buchanan No. 304, Saskatchewan

=== Liberia ===
- Buchanan, Liberia, a large coastal town

=== United Kingdom ===
- Buchanan, Stirling, Scotland

=== United States ===
- Buchanan, Tuolumne County, California, unincorporated community
- Fort Buchanan, Kansas, a former town and pioneer fort
- Buchanan, Georgia, city
- Buchanan, Iowa, unincorporated community
- Buchanan Creek, a stream in Iowa
- Buchanan, Michigan, city
- Buchanan, New York, village
- Buchanan, North Dakota, city
- Buchanan, Oregon, unincorporated community
- Fort Buchanan, Puerto Rico, a US Army installation
- Buchanan, Tennessee
- Buchanan, Texas, former community
- Buchanan, Virginia, town
- Buchanan, Wisconsin, town
- Buchanan Township, Michigan
- Fort Buchanan, Arizona, former US Army base

== Music ==
- Buchanan (band), an Australian alternative rock band

== Other uses ==
- Clan Buchanan
- Buchanan (car), an Australian carmaker
- Buchanan (horse), an American Thoroughbred racehorse, the winner of the 1884 Kentucky Derby
- Buchanan High School (Clovis, California), a high school in Clovis, California, USA
- Buchanan High School, North Lanarkshire, a high school in Coatbridge, North Lanarkshire, Scotland
- Buchanan's, a brand of Scotch whisky
- Buchanan v. Warley, a 1917 United States Supreme Court case.

== See also ==
- Buchanan County (disambiguation)
- Buchanan Valley (disambiguation)
- Buchannon (disambiguation)
- Buckhannon
- James Buchanan (disambiguation)
- Justice Buchanan (disambiguation)
