= William Buchanan =

William or Bill Buchanan may refer to:

- William Buchanan (Manitoba politician) (1865–1944), Irish-born Canadian Conservative politician
- William Buchanan (Nova Scotia politician) (19th century), Canadian Liberal politician
- William Buchanan (locomotive designer) (1830–1910), designed trains for the New York Central
- William Buchanan (pastoralist) (1824–1911), Australian pastoralist and gold prospector
- William Buchanan (footballer) (1911–1985), Scottish amateur footballer
- William Izett Buchanan (born 1972), American expatriate basketball player
- William I. Buchanan (1853–1909), American diplomat
- William Ashbury Buchanan (1876–1954), journalist, publisher and politician based in Alberta
- William Murdoch Buchanan (1897–1966), Canadian politician and dentist
- Bill Buchanan (24), a fictional character in 24
- Bill Buchanan (arts administrator) (1932–2018), Scottish arts administrator
- Bill Buchanan (computer scientist) (born 1961), Scottish computer scientist
- Bill Buchanan (songwriter) (1930–1996), American songwriter
- Billy Buchanan (1924–1999), Scottish footballer with Carlisle United and Barrow

== See also ==
- Willie Buchanon (born 1950), American football player
