= Peter Buchanan =

Peter Buchanan may refer to:

- Peter Buchanan (Royal Navy officer) (1925–2011)
- Peter Buchanan (architect) (1942–2023), architect, urbanist, writer and exhibition curator
- Peter Buchanan (footballer, born 1915) (1915–1977), Scottish football player (Chelsea FC, Fulham FC, Brentford FC, national team)
- Peter Buchanan (footballer, born 1938), Scottish football player and club president (Queen's Park)
- Peter Buchanan (judge) (1943–2014), judge of the Supreme Court of Victoria, Australia
- Peter Buchanan (rugby union) (1889–1957), rugby union player who represented Australia
- Peter Buchanan (jockey), Northern Irish jockey see 2011 Grand National
- Pete Buchanan, a character in Hollyoaks

== See also ==
- Peter Buchanan-Smith (born 1972), designer, teacher and entrepreneur
