= Justice Buchanan =

Justice Buchanan may refer to:

- Alexander McKenzie Buchanan (1805–1868), associate justice of the Louisiana Supreme Court
- Archibald C. Buchanan (1890–1979), associate justice of the Supreme Court of Virginia
- Arthur S. Buchanan (1856–1919), associate justice of the Tennessee Supreme Court
- John Buchanan (Maryland judge) (1772–1844), associate justice and chief justice of the Maryland Court of Appeals
- John A. Buchanan (1843–1921), associate justice of the Supreme Court of Virginia
- Peter Buchanan (judge) (1943–2014), judge of the Supreme Court of Victoria
