= Arthur Buchanan =

Arthur Buchanan may refer to:

- Arthur S. Buchanan (1856–1919), Justice of the Tennessee Supreme Court
- A. L. H. Buchanan (1866–1925), Coalition Unionist Party MP for Coatbridge
