= Daniel Buchanan =

Daniel Buchanan may refer to:

- Daniel Buchanan (Shortland Street), a character from the soap opera Shortland Street
- Daniel Buchanan (mathematician) (1880–1950), Canadian mathematics and astronomy professor
