= The Whole World Is Watching (The Falcon and the Winter Soldier) =

- The Falcon and the Winter Soldier episode
- The fourth of several art posters released for the series, with art by Tracie Ching
- Episode no.: Episode 4
- Directed by: Kari Skogland
- Written by: Derek Kolstad
- Cinematography by: P.J. Dillon
- Editing by: Jeffrey Ford; Kelley Dixon
- Original release date: April 9, 2021
- Running time: 53 minutes

Cast
- Clé Bennett as Lemar Hoskins / Battlestar; Desmond Chiam as Dovich; Dani Deetee as Gigi; Indya Bussey as DeeDee; Renes Rivera as Lennox; Tyler Dean Flores as Diego; Noah Mills as Nico; Janeshia Adams-Ginyard as Nomble; Zola Williams as Yama; Veronica Falcón as Donya Madani

Episode chronology
← Previous "Power Broker"	Next → "Truth"

"The Whole World Is Watching" is the fourth episode of the American television miniseries The Falcon and the Winter Soldier, based on Marvel Comics featuring the characters Sam Wilson / Falcon and Bucky Barnes / Winter Soldier. It follows the pair as they continue to reluctantly work with Helmut Zemo to locate and stop the Flag Smashers. The episode is set in the Marvel Cinematic Universe (MCU), sharing continuity with the films of the franchise. It was written by Derek Kolstad and directed by Kari Skogland.

Anthony Mackie and Sebastian Stan reprise their respective roles as Sam Wilson and Bucky Barnes from the film series, with Emily VanCamp, Wyatt Russell, Erin Kellyman, Florence Kasumba, Adepero Oduye, and Daniel Brühl (Zemo) also starring. Development began by October 2018, and Skogland joined in May 2019. Kolstad was hired that July. The episode explores the complex morals of John Walker / Captain America (Russell) and depicts him publicly murdering an unarmed man, an act that acknowledges police brutality in the United States. Filming took place at Pinewood Atlanta Studios in Atlanta, Georgia, with location filming in the Atlanta metropolitan area and in Prague.

"The Whole World Is Watching" was released on the streaming service Disney+ on April 9, 2021. Viewership for the series that week was estimated to be high. Critics praised the episode's darker tone and exploration of serious themes, in addition to the appearance of characters from Wakanda, but there were mixed responses to the focus on Walker.

== Plot ==
In Wakanda, Ayo tests if Shuri's deprogramming of Bucky Barnes from his Winter Soldier persona was successful by reciting the trigger words associated with it. Ayo declares Bucky to be liberated from being the Winter Soldier as he passed the test, to Bucky's joy and relief.

Six years later, in the present, Ayo confronts Bucky regarding Helmut Zemo, a terrorist who previously killed Wakandan king T'Chaka. (Note: As depicted in the film Captain America: Civil War (2016)) Since Barnes broke Zemo out of prison to help him find the terrorist group Flag Smashers, Ayo gives Barnes eight hours before the Wakandans arrive to apprehend Zemo. Barnes, Zemo, and Sam Wilson investigate a camp in Latvia where Flag Smasher sympathizers house and teach those displaced by the return of people from the Blip. (Note: As a result of the Avengers' actions during the events of the film Avengers: Endgame (2019))

Zemo discovers a memorial service for Donya Madani, the adoptive mother of the Flag Smashers' leader Karli Morgenthau. He, Wilson, and Barnes are confronted by John Walker and his partner Lemar Hoskins. Wilson convinces them to let him speak to Morgenthau, but as he tries to persuade her to change her violent methods they are interrupted by an impatient Walker. A fight ensues and Zemo shoots Morgenthau, causing her to drop Super Soldier Serum vials. As he is destroying these, Zemo is incapacitated by Walker who takes the remaining vial. Morgenthau escapes.

The Dora Milaje arrive to apprehend Zemo, but Walker refuses to hand him over. In the ensuing fight, Walker is humiliated while Zemo escapes. Walker later discusses the Super Soldier Serum with Hoskins, who suggests Walker will make the right decision should he take it. Meanwhile, Morgenthau plans to divide the group and threatens Wilson's sister, Sarah, and her family to lure him and Barnes into a meeting. Walker and Hoskins attack other Flag Smashers, with Wilson and Barnes rushing to find them, resulting in another fight where Wilson realizes Walker has taken the serum.

Morgenthau follows Wilson and Barnes and joins the fight, accidentally killing Hoskins. Enraged by his death, Walker chases down a member of Flag Smashers named Nico, who held him back from saving Hoskins, and violently beats him to death with his shield. He then realizes that he is surrounded by horrified bystanders who witnessed and recorded his actions, including Wilson, Barnes and Morgenthau.

== Production ==
=== Development ===
By October 2018, Marvel Studios was developing a limited series starring Anthony Mackie's Sam Wilson / Falcon and Sebastian Stan's Bucky Barnes / Winter Soldier from the Marvel Cinematic Universe (MCU) films. Malcolm Spellman was hired as head writer of the series, which was announced as The Falcon and the Winter Soldier in April 2019. Spellman modeled the series after buddy films that deal with race, such as 48 Hrs. (1982), The Defiant Ones (1958), Lethal Weapon (1987), and Rush Hour (1998). Kari Skogland was hired to direct the miniseries a month later, and executive produced alongside Spellman and Marvel Studios' Kevin Feige, Louis D'Esposito, Victoria Alonso, and Nate Moore. Derek Kolstad joined the writing team in July 2019, and revealed in March 2021 that he had written the fourth episode, which is titled "The Whole World Is Watching". This references "The whole world is watching", the phrase chanted by anti-Vietnam War protestors during the August 28, 1968, police riot in Chicago during the 1968 Democratic National Convention.

=== Writing ===
Spellman said a lot of thought was put into the episode's opening flashback to Barnes's time in Wakanda. He said the confirmation that the character's Winter Soldier programming has been removed was a moment "at least 80 years in the making" for Barnes and needed to be presented with "gravitas". Stan was grateful for the scene's inclusion, saying it was both exciting and scary to approach. He noted that it is a rare moment for Barnes to "let go" of his emotions. For the later scene where Barnes and Wilson are confronted by the Wakandans, Stan suggested changes that were informed by his understanding of the character's relationship to Wakanda. He said Barnes "owes everything to the Wakandans" and understands that he has gone too far by colluding with Helmut Zemo, but he is also growing as his own person again and looking to take charge of his situation. When Ayo disarms Barnes's robotic arm, Stan said this was a warning and a reminder of what the Wakandans have done for him: "a little bit putting him back in his place, which I think he needed at that point".

Spellman felt many Black characters in past films were either a "magical negro whose job is to service a white character" or be fridged, but he thought the decision to have Lemar Hoskins killed was more justified. He felt the series had earned the moment by "telling all these other stories with heart" and was confident in the audiences' ability to comprehend the connotations of the scene. Zemo actor Daniel Brühl discussed the scene where his character destroys the Super Soldier Serum vials, stating that Zemo has strong personal beliefs, particularly in rejecting the idea of superheroes, and feels the serum is dangerous "no matter in which hands it's in".

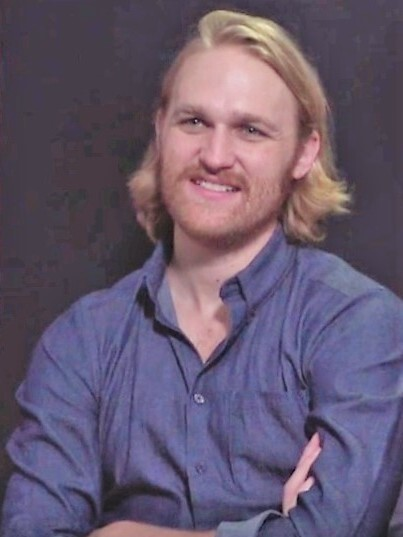
The episode explores themes of PTSD and police brutality through the character John Walker, portrayed by co-star Wyatt Russell.

The episode discusses some of the PTSD that John Walker / Captain America suffers from, with actor Wyatt Russell explaining that circumstances surrounding the character's Medals of Honor represent failure to him and his attempts to right those wrongs are making things worse. Russell discussed the character with one of the series' trainers who was a former Marine, and he suggested Russell listen to an interview with Medal of Honor-winning Marine Dakota Meyer as research for the character. Russell felt Walker was the kind of character that is needed when fighting a war, but can sometimes go "overboard", which is how he described Walker's killing of Nico at the end of the episode. He added that Nico "didn't deserve to be killed by a shield. But he's a bad guy." Russell also compared the character to an "overzealous cop" who uses excessive force to get what he wants, referencing police brutality in the United States. Russell said the U.S. government had trained Walker to be a killer through his military background, so there is a robotic quality to Walker killing Nico because he is just doing his job without thinking about the moral implications.

On the symbolism of Walker using Captain America's shield to kill an unarmed man, Moore said the characters were all trying to come to terms with the difference between reality and ideals, and the shield represents some of those ideals since it previously belonged to Steve Rogers who represented doing the right thing. He said seeing the shield covered in blood was inherently impactful due to the blood covering a symbol of those ideals, and he noted that fans had a visceral reaction to that when the episode was released. He also said a central idea of the series was exploring what it means to be American and patriotic, especially from the Wilson's perspective, and he felt that to do so honestly they could not ignore the imagery of an American symbol being used to kill an unarmed man. Spellman thought this was an inevitable conclusion for the series to draw and was not done out of any agenda, believing the series would have been criticized if it tried to avoid such difficult topics. Mackie acknowledged that the shield has been used as a weapon in the MCU before, but never in such a public and non-heroic way, and he said the use of blood adds effect since the MCU films rarely show blood. Actress Adepero Oduye added that "sometimes people need to see blood for it to get real" and felt the scene was the point where people could not be oblivious to reality. Skogland said the series had been exploring what the shield means to different people, and this moment was "deconstructing and staining what that shield had been".

=== Casting ===
The episode stars Anthony Mackie as Sam Wilson, Sebastian Stan as Bucky Barnes, Emily VanCamp as Sharon Carter, Wyatt Russell as John Walker / Captain America, Erin Kellyman as Karli Morgenthau, Florence Kasumba as Ayo, Adepero Oduye as Sarah Wilson, and Daniel Brühl as Helmet Zemo. Also appearing are Clé Bennett as Lemar Hoskins / Battlestar, Desmond Chiam, Dani Deetté, and Indya Bussey as the Flag Smashers Dovich, Gigi, and DeeDee, respectively, Renes Rivera as Lennox, Tyler Dean Flores as Diego, Noah Mills as Nico, Janeshia Adams-Ginyard as Nomble, Zola Williams as Yama, and Veronica Falcón as Donya Madani.

=== Filming ===
Filming for the series officially began in November 2019, taking place at Pinewood Atlanta Studios in Atlanta, Georgia, with Skogland directing, and P.J. Dillon serving as cinematographer. Location filming took place in the Atlanta metropolitan area and in Prague. The series was shot like a film, with Skogland and Dillon filming all of the content at once based on available locations. The Wakanda flashback sequence was filmed after a break for the holidays, during which time Stan had grown a beard for the sequence. Skogland described it as a "magical night" and used the fire in the scene to give it a "murky" quality. It was filmed in 27 takes. Dillon said he and his team did the "very tight work" for the scene and the rest was handled by the visual effects team. Production was halted due to the COVID-19 pandemic in March 2020, and was scheduled to resume that August. Dillon returned to his home in Europe when the production shut down and was unable to come back to the U.S. when filming resumed. Several sequences in the episode were therefore shot without Dillon's involvement, including: the shot of Zemo smashing vials of Super Soldier Serum that was made to look like the camera was underneath a transparent floor; and the episode's final sequence which ends on a shot of Walker holding the shield with blood on it. The latter shot was filmed at a low angle, contrasting with the character's introduction in the first episode which used the same angle to portray him as a hero.

=== Visual effects ===
Eric Leven served as the visual effects supervisor for The Falcon and the Winter Soldier, with the episode's visual effects created by Tippett Studio, QPPE, Rodeo FX, Crafty Apes, Cantina Creative, and Digital Frontier FX. Rodeo FX worked on the climactic Super Soldier fight, including a moment where John Walker jumps through a window, lands on a car, and then continues running. Two shots of stunt doubles were used, one for jumping through the window and one for landing on the car. Rodeo combined these with a digital double of Walker so the character could be shown to continue running straight from the fall.

=== Music ===
Selections from composer Henry Jackman's score for the episode were included in the series' Vol. 2 soundtrack album, which was released digitally by Marvel Music and Hollywood Records on April 30, 2021.

== Marketing ==
On March 19, 2021, Marvel announced a series of posters that were created by various artists to correspond with the episodes of the series. The posters were released weekly ahead of each episode, with the fourth poster, designed by Tracie Ching, being revealed on April 8. After the episode's release, Marvel announced merchandise inspired by the episode, centered on Wilson and Barnes, as part of its weekly "Marvel Must Haves" promotion for each episode of the series, including apparel and accessories.

== Release ==
"The Whole World Is Watching" was released on Disney+ on April 9, 2021. The episode, along with the rest of The Falcon and the Winter Soldier, was released on Ultra HD Blu-ray and Blu-ray on April 30, 2024.

== Reception ==
=== Viewership ===
Nielsen Media Research, which measures the number of minutes watched by United States audiences on television sets, listed The Falcon and the Winter Soldier as the second most-watched original series across streaming services for the week of April 5 to 11, 2021. Between the first four episodes, which were available at the time, the series had 748 million minutes viewed.

=== Critical response ===
The review aggregator website Rotten Tomatoes reported a 91% approval rating with an average score of 7.8/10 based on 34 reviews. The site's critical consensus reads, "A darker installment that delivers tons of character development, 'The World is Watching' sets the stage for an epic–if potentially crowded–final stretch."

Giving the episode a 9 out of 10, Matt Purslow of IGN found it to be the darkest and most serious of the series so far. He praised its focus on serious matters and how that allowed a deeper exploration of the motivations of characters such as Walker and Morgenthau. He was critical of how the series was handling the reaction to the Blip, notably with the Flag Smashers' reaction to the Global Repatriation Council and the "somewhat incomplex" appearance of the Dora Milaje, but he did regard the resulting fight sequence with the Dora Milaje as notable for its psychological impact on Walker. Purslow concluded that, while the episode marked a diversion from the buddy comedy style of the previous episodes, the darker tone allowed it to tell its story with the "adequate weight the show's themes demand". Sulagna Misra at The A.V. Club, giving the episode an "A−", wrote that "The Whole World Is Watching" returned to the emotional through line from the first two episodes. She praised Russell's acting in the episode, saying he was able to strike a balance between Walker's frustrations and fears. Misra also highlighted the appearance of the Dora Milaje and the production design for Donya Madani's funeral. Rolling Stone's Alan Sepinwall believed Stan had strong acting moments in the opening Wakanda flashback, calling his portrayal of Barnes's emotions "so palpable". He felt the shot of the Dora Milaje holding Captain America's shield was "among the more memorable images this show has given us" despite it lasting only a few seconds.

Christian Holub of Entertainment Weekly gave the episode a "B". He was fascinated by Zemo's conversation with Wilson and Barnes about those who seek out superpowers, and he said his favorite scene of the episode was the fight between the Dora Milaje and John Walker. Brian Tallerico of Vulture gave the episode 4 out of 5 stars, saying it was setting up a story about "what exactly it means to be a hero in 2021" and felt the series was "one of the most morally complex productions" of the MCU. However, he was critical of the death of Lemar Hoskins, a Black person, as an example of racial fridging as it was used to further the story arc of John Walker, a white person. Writing for IndieWire, Leonardo Adrian Garcia was less positive about the episode, giving it a "C+". He found it to be less exciting than the previous episodes due to the focus on Morgenthau and Walker, and said its pacing was "strangely slow". In particular, he found the focus on John Walker to be a "slog" and said the character was "one-note". Garcia hoped the final two episodes would return to the buddy cop format, be "chockfull of action", and tie up plot threads. However, Garcia did enjoy the Wakanda opening and appearance of the Dora Milaje, saying that, like the MCU miniseries WandaVision (2021), this series was "delivering on the grief and trauma fronts".
