= Power Broker (The Falcon and the Winter Soldier) =

- The Falcon and the Winter Soldier episode
- The third of several art posters released for the series, with art by Bella Grace
- Episode no.: Episode 3
- Directed by: Kari Skogland
- Written by: Derek Kolstad
- Cinematography by: P.J. Dillon
- Editing by: Jeffrey Ford; Rosanne Tan
- Original release date: April 2, 2021
- Running time: 53 minutes

Cast
- Clé Bennett as Lemar Hoskins / Battlestar; Desmond Chiam as Dovich; Dani Deetee as Gigi; Indya Bussey as DeeDee; Renes Rivera as Lennox; Tyler Dean Flores as Diego; Noah Mills as Nico; Veronica Falcón as Donya Madani; Neal Kodinsky as Rudy; Nicholas Pryor as Oeznik; Imelda Corcoran as Selby; Olli Haaskivi as Wilfred Nagel

Episode chronology
← Previous "The Star-Spangled Man"	Next → "The Whole World Is Watching"

"Power Broker" is the third episode of the American television miniseries The Falcon and the Winter Soldier, based on Marvel Comics featuring the characters Sam Wilson / Falcon and Bucky Barnes / Winter Soldier. It follows the pair as they reluctantly work with Helmut Zemo to learn more about the creation of a new Super Soldier Serum. The episode is set in the Marvel Cinematic Universe (MCU), sharing continuity with the films of the franchise. It was written by Derek Kolstad and directed by Kari Skogland.

Sebastian Stan and Anthony Mackie reprise their respective roles as Bucky Barnes and Sam Wilson from the film series, with Emily VanCamp, Wyatt Russell, Erin Kellyman, Florence Kasumba, Danny Ramirez, Adepero Oduye, and Daniel Brühl (Zemo) also starring. Development began by October 2018, and Skogland joined in May 2019. Kolstad was hired that July. The episode visits the fictional country of Madripoor, a comic book location that was previously controlled by 20th Century Fox and could not be introduced to the MCU until the acquisition of 21st Century Fox by Disney. Filming took place at Pinewood Atlanta Studios in Atlanta, Georgia, with location filming in the Atlanta metropolitan area and in Prague. Sets for Madripoor were created in Georgia, taking inspiration from Asian locations such as Vietnam, and combined with footage of Prague as well as visual effects.

"Power Broker" was released on the streaming service Disney+ on April 2, 2021. Viewership for the series was estimated to be on-par with the previous week. Critics were more mixed on the episode than previous ones, criticizing its multiple story elements and use of existing action tropes. Several critics praised Brühl's performance, and a brief moment of Zemo dancing that Brühl improvised during filming spawned various internet memes and led to the release of additional footage.

== Plot ==
Bucky Barnes and Sam Wilson travel to Berlin to talk to an imprisoned Helmut Zemo about the emergence of a terrorist group of Super Soldiers, the Flag Smashers. Behind Wilson's back, Barnes orchestrates a prison riot to help Zemo escape after the latter agrees to help the pair. Barnes, Zemo, and Wilson travel to Madripoor, a criminal sanctuary city-state run by the mysterious Power Broker. Zemo asks Barnes to act as the Winter Soldier while Wilson poses as a gangster who frequents Madripoor.

After Zemo uses Barnes to get the attention of high-ranking criminal Selby, the group meet with her and learn that Hydra scientist Dr. Wilfred Nagel was hired by the Power Broker to recreate the Super Soldier Serum. Wilson's identity is exposed after his sister Sarah calls him in the middle of their meeting. In the ensuing firefight, Selby is killed and all of the bounty hunters in the city target the group. Sharon Carter, who has been living as a fugitive since the Sokovia Accords conflict, (Note: As depicted in the film Captain America: Civil War (2016)) saves them from the bounty hunters.

Carter uses her connections in Madripoor to find Nagel's lab and takes Wilson, Barnes, and Zemo there. Nagel explains that he recreated twenty doses of the serum which were stolen by the Flag Smashers' leader Karli Morgenthau. Zemo kills Nagel to prevent further serum doses from being created, and the lab is destroyed when bounty hunters attack. Wilson, Barnes, and Zemo escape while Carter chooses to remain in Madripoor; Wilson agrees to obtain a pardon for her so she can return to the U.S.

John Walker and Lemar Hoskins arrive in Berlin and deduce that Barnes and Wilson helped Zemo escape. The Flag Smashers raid a Global Repatriation Council (GRC) storage facility in Lithuania for supplies, and Morgenthau blows up the building with people still inside to send a message. Zemo, Barnes, and Wilson travel to Latvia in search of Morgenthau. Recognizing Wakandan tracking devices in the street, Barnes leaves the others to confront the one who is following them: Ayo of Wakanda's Dora Milaje, who demands that Barnes hand Zemo to her.

== Production ==
=== Development ===
By October 2018, Marvel Studios was developing a limited series starring Anthony Mackie's Sam Wilson / Falcon and Sebastian Stan's Bucky Barnes / Winter Soldier from the Marvel Cinematic Universe (MCU) films. Malcolm Spellman was hired as head writer of the series, which was announced as The Falcon and the Winter Soldier in April 2019. Spellman modeled the series after buddy films that deal with race, such as 48 Hrs. (1982), The Defiant Ones (1958), Lethal Weapon (1987), and Rush Hour (1998). Kari Skogland was hired to direct the miniseries a month later, and executive produced alongside Spellman and Marvel Studios' Kevin Feige, Louis D'Esposito, Victoria Alonso, and Nate Moore. Derek Kolstad joined the writing team in July 2019, and revealed in March 2021 that he had written the third episode, which is titled "Power Broker".

=== Writing ===
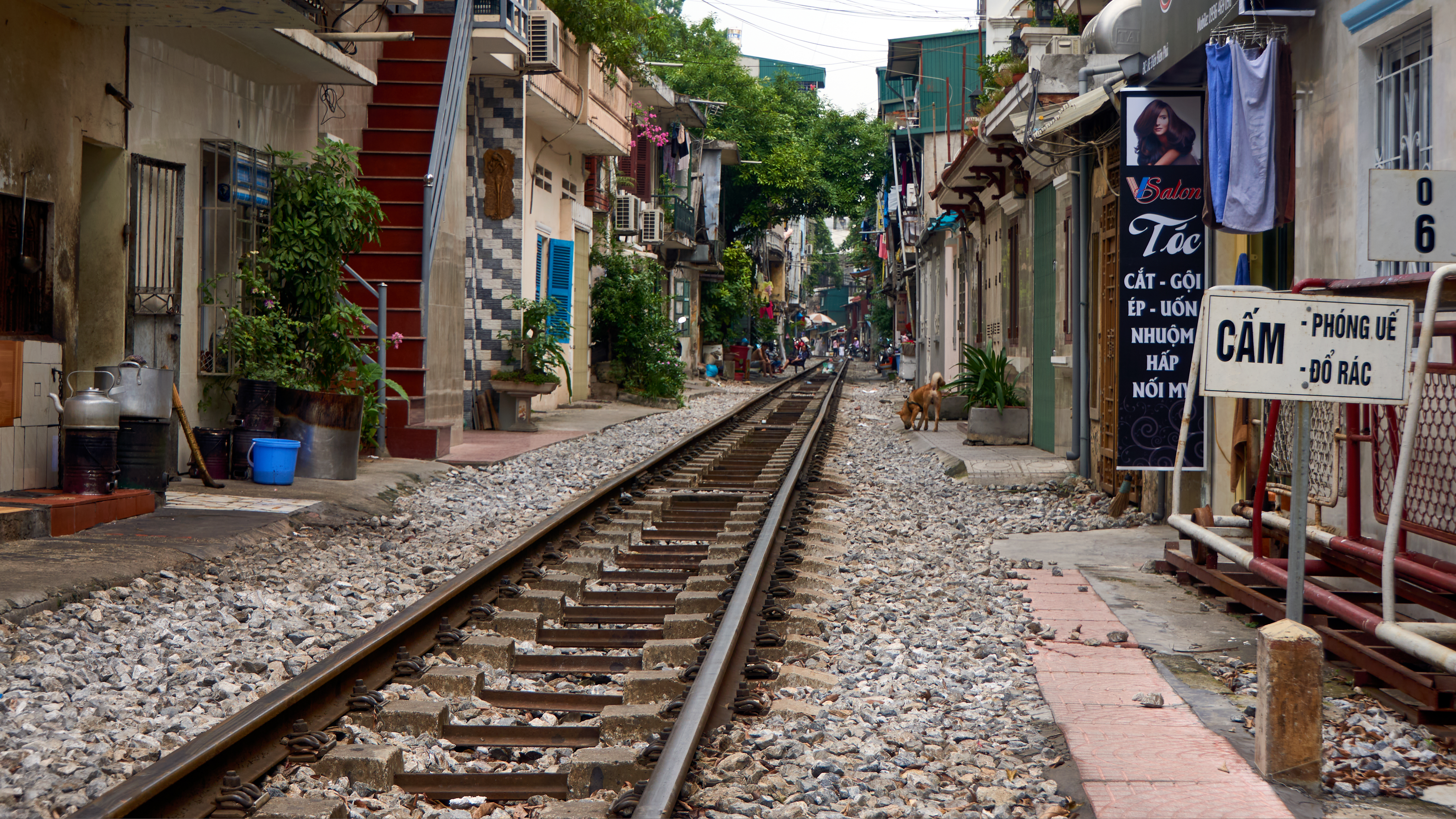
The streets of Hanoi were one inspiration for the episode's depiction of Madripoor, a location that is visited for the first time in the MCU

The episode visits the fictional country of Madripoor, which is one of the first X-Men-centric elements previously controlled by 20th Century Fox to be introduced to the MCU following the acquisition of 21st Century Fox by Disney. The Princess Bar, which is frequented by Wolverine in the comics, is referenced with a neon sign, while the Brass Monkey Saloon appears. In the latter, Wilson, Barnes, and Helmut Zemo meet a character named Selby, which is the name of a mutant from the comics that understands binary code. Spellman originally intended to use a real-life "outlaw city", but when Marvel realized that the series' depiction of this aligned with their own hopes for Madripoor in the MCU they allowed the writers to integrate Madripoor with their storyline. Spellman said the writers "geeked out" at being able to do this, and co-executive producer Zoie Nagelhout said it was incredible to introduce the country to the MCU and expand that world. She added that Madripoor allowed Wilson and Barnes to feel like fish out of water while providing a place to reintroduce Sharon Carter to the MCU. Carter's personality has changed following the events of Captain America: Civil War (2016), with actress Emily VanCamp describing her as having "quite a bit more edge" than was previously seen. She said there are subtle indications throughout the episode of how Carter has survived in Madripoor since Civil War, and said the character's primary goal was using Wilson and Barnes to gain a pardon for her alleged crimes so her life can return to normal. She enjoyed exploring a more cynical version of the character who is acting independently.

=== Casting ===
The episode stars Sebastian Stan as Bucky Barnes, Anthony Mackie as Sam Wilson, Emily VanCamp as Sharon Carter, Wyatt Russell as John Walker / Captain America, Erin Kellyman as Karli Morgenthau, Florence Kasumba as Ayo, Danny Ramirez as Joaquin Torres, Adepero Oduye as Sarah Wilson, and Daniel Brühl as Helmut Zemo. Also appearing are Clé Bennett as Lemar Hoskins / Battlestar, Desmond Chiam, Dani Deetté, and Indya Bussey as the Flag Smashers Dovich, Gigi, and DeeDee, respectively, Renes Rivera as Lennox, Tyler Dean Flores as Diego, Noah Mills as Nico, Veronica Falcón as Donya Madani, Neal Kodinsky as Rudy, Nicholas Pryor as Oeznik, Imelda Corcoran as Selby, and Olli Haaskivi as Wilfred Nagel. Haaskivi originally auditioned for a character simply called "Doctor", and did not find out his actual role until a few days before filming. He researched the comics once he knew the name, but did not find much information on the character and felt he was able to create his own interpretation instead. Matt Patches of Polygon felt including Ayo from the film Black Panther (2018) had "thematic resonance", beyond acknowledging Barnes's role in that film, since both The Falcon and the Winter Soldier and Black Panther deal with themes of racial issues in America and global class warfare.

=== Design ===
Skogland wanted to create a signature look for Madripoor, something that she hoped would be "exotic and a bit familiar but off-grid; to have a real street feel but be quite colorful and eye-popping". Many different real-world locations were used as inspiration for the fictional country, and the production initially considered filming Madripoor in a real Asian location such as Myanmar, Thailand, or Vietnam, but this was not possible with the series' schedule. Instead, they settled on creating the city in the U.S. It was ultimately filmed in an alley in the city of Griffin, Georgia. Production designer Ray Chan wanted to replicate the "tightness of the streets" in Vietnam with the alley, which was chosen for its "interesting features and geometry". The design team added steel bridges, neon lights, and 80 light boxes. A set of train tracks running the length of the set was added as a reference to the backstreets of Hanoi. As for the Brass Monkey bar, Skogland described it as being like a street bar that had a sense of "emerging out of the bricks". The set featured a 270 degree aquarium with 100 Oranda goldfish, as well as "gangster art" on the walls from a Los Angeles graffiti artist. Costume designer Michael Crow said the costumes of Madripoor's Lowtown had an "oil slick" color palette of greens, browns, dark blues, grays, and dark purples. He researched the clothing of different gangs and criminal organizations from around the world. For the Hightown costumes, Crow did research into fashion trends but wanted the taste level to be "a little less refined".

=== Filming ===
Filming for the series officially began in November 2019, taking place at Pinewood Atlanta Studios in Atlanta, Georgia, with Skogland directing, and P.J. Dillon serving as cinematographer. Location filming took place in the Atlanta metropolitan area and in Prague. The series was shot like a film, with Skogland and Dillon filming all of the content at once based on available locations. Dillon's approach to filming Madripoor was based on the design work already done by Chan and Marvel Studios, as well as reference photographs compiled by Skogland; his goal was to execute the concepts they provided. He said the alley set was the "biggest sleight of hand that we pulled on the whole show". He enjoyed the experience, but said it was the most technically difficult part of shooting the series. He also acknowledged that there were some similarities between the series' depiction of Madripoor and the film Blade Runner (1982), but that was not a conscious reference. Production was halted due to the COVID-19 pandemic in March 2020, and was scheduled to resume that August. Dillon returned to his home in Europe when the production shut down and was unable to come back to the U.S. when filming resumed. A lot of the third episode's footage was filmed after production resumed.

Prior to filming the episode's shipyard action sequence, VanCamp discussed Carter's combat style with the stunt team. They wanted to reflect the character's comic book depiction of being a competent special agent through the choreography, and the sequence shows Carter making use of any weapons she can find which VanCamp felt "made it a little bit more brutal and gritty and interesting". Brühl was excited to explore Zemo's background as an aristocratic baron, showing a side of Zemo that is more arrogant and "posh". He also enjoyed having more comedic moments in the episode, particularly during the scene in which Zemo, Wilson, and Barnes discuss Marvin Gaye. Brühl improvised a moment in which he plays with Barnes's chin and said there were a "couple of takes where [Stan] couldn't deal with it". For the scene where Sarah calls Wilson and breaks his cover, Oduye and Mackie were filmed actually talking to one another on the phone. Oduye said Mackie was generous for doing that so she did not have to talk to a random person when filming her side of the call.

External videos
- One Hour Dancing Zemo | Marvel Studios' The Falcon and the Winter Soldier | Disney+ presents the full dance sequence with Zemo as an hour-long loop, YouTube video from Marvel Entertainment's channel

A brief moment in the episode of Zemo dancing and fist pumping spawned various Internet memes. This was improvised by Brühl during filming, who felt Zemo needed to "let off some steam and show his moves" after years in prison, and he thought it would be cut from the final episode. Approximately 30 seconds of footage existed of Brühl dancing, more than what was included in the episode, and Marvel released the full sequence on social media on April 8, 2021, along with a looping hour-long version. VanCamp said footage also existed of Mackie and Stan dancing. Disney's president of marketing, Asad Ayaz, said his team was aware of fan reactions and trends on social media and had worked quickly to release the footage when they saw that Zemo dancing was a trending topic. Ayaz felt this was a "sensation" that took off rather than traditional marketing or advertising.

=== Visual effects ===
Eric Leven served as the visual effects supervisor for The Falcon and the Winter Soldier, with the episode's visual effects created by Crafty Apes, Rodeo FX, Digital Frontier FX, QPPE, Stereo D, Tippett Studio, and Cantina Creative. 250 visual effects artists at Rodeo, led by Sébastien Francoeur, were responsible for creating a digital version of Madripoor. Francoeur was inspired by panoramas and the skyscrapers of Hong Kong, envisioned Madripoor as a "spooky" version of Las Vegas, and took additional inspiration from Singapore and Shanghai according to Rodeo producer Graeme Marshall. They sought to distinguish the Hightown and Lowtown locales, and had to adjust establishing shots filmed in Prague to make the appearance of Madripoor consistent throughout the episode. The Troja Bridge was a focal point for this footage.

=== Music ===
Selections from composer Henry Jackman's score for the episode were included in the series' Vol. 1 soundtrack album, which was released digitally by Marvel Music and Hollywood Records on April 9, 2021.

== Marketing ==
On March 19, 2021, Marvel announced a series of posters that were created by various artists to correspond with the episodes of the series. The posters were released weekly ahead of each episode, with the third poster, designed by Bella Grace, being revealed on March 21. After the episode's release, Marvel announced merchandise inspired by the episode, centered on Sharon Carter and Zemo, as part of its weekly "Marvel Must Haves" promotion for each episode of the series, including apparel and Funko Pops, as well as a Marvel Legends figure of Zemo, and Sharon Carter posters. Marvel also created a viral marketing tourism site for Madripoor, featuring Easter eggs such as wanted posters, clips of CCTV footage showing different angles of the episode's action scenes, and downloadable phone and computer wallpapers. The Buccaneer Bay and Hightown Nightclub areas of the site had hidden content, with the Buccaneer Bay area listing ships with the names of X-Men characters such as Mystique, Daken, and Krakoa, as well as Shang-Chi; these names were later removed from the site.

== Release ==
"Power Broker" was released on Disney+ on April 2, 2021. In March 2022, the original version of the episode was replaced with an alternate cut that had certain scenes edited, censoring and removing some instances of blood. Disney explained that the episode was updated to change an incorrect credit and the censored version had been accidentally published in the process. The company said the original version of the episode would be restored. The episode, along with the rest of The Falcon and the Winter Soldier, was released on Ultra HD Blu-ray and Blu-ray on April 30, 2024.

== Reception ==
=== Viewership ===
Nielsen Media Research, which measures the number of minutes watched by United States audiences on television sets, listed The Falcon and the Winter Soldier as the second most-watched original series across streaming services for the week of March 29 to April 4, 2021. Between the first three episodes, which were available at the time, the series had 628 million minutes viewed, which was identical to the previous week.

=== Critical response ===
The review aggregator website Rotten Tomatoes reported an 86% approval rating with an average score of 6.9/10 based on 36 reviews. The site's critical consensus reads, "Falcon and the Winter Soldier is still spreading its wings when it should be soaring during this transitionary installment, but 'Power Broker' is still a lot of fun thanks to the return of Daniel Brühl and Emily VanCamp to the MCU."

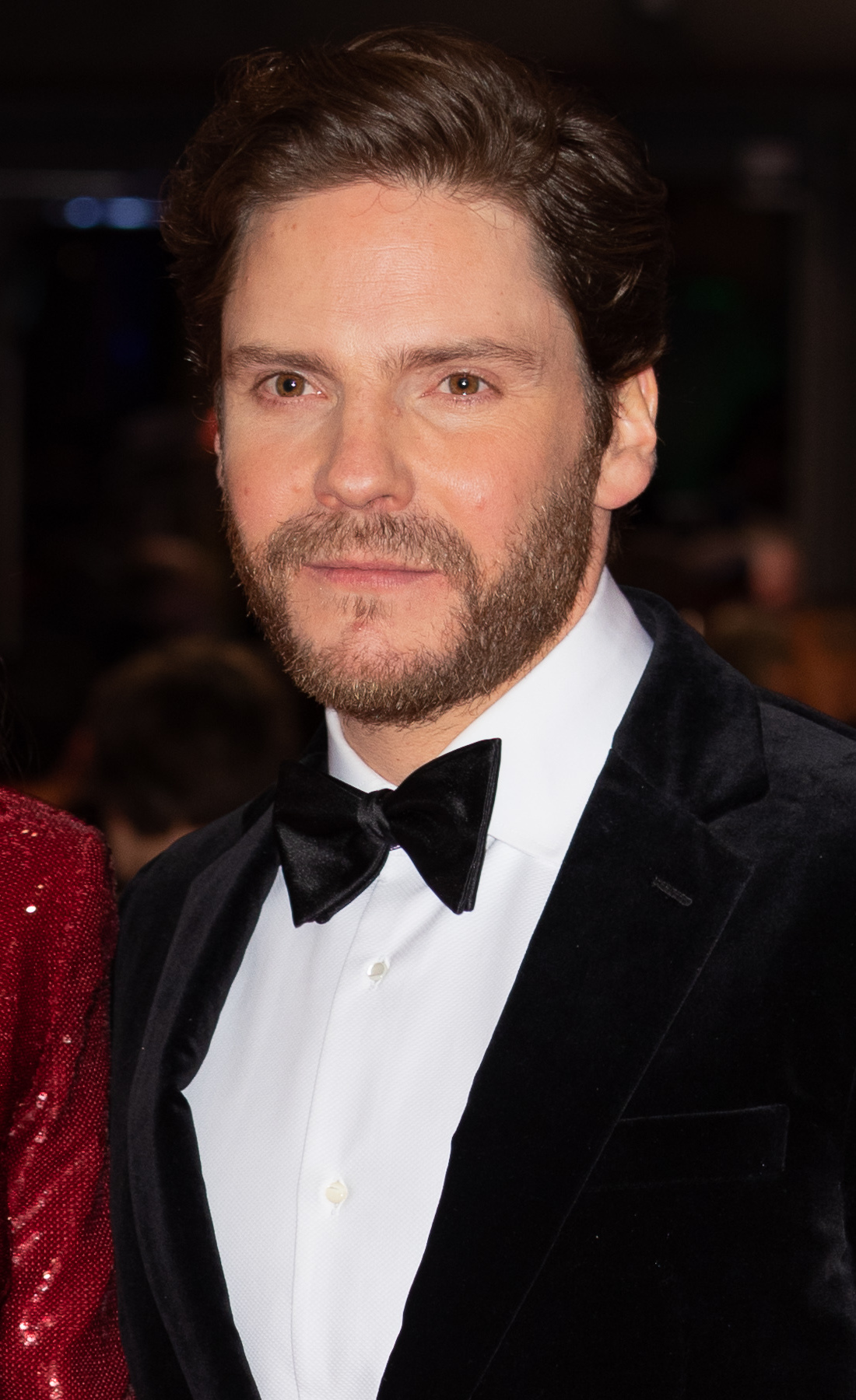
Daniel Brühl received praise for his performance in the episode, and a short dance sequence he improvised spawned various internet memes

Sulagna Misra at The A.V. Club was critical of the episode, giving it a "C" grade, saying it was more interested in using existing action movie tropes than developing its story and characters and left her "thinking of the times I've seen better versions of each of these scenes". She also felt the characterization of some characters, including Sharon Carter, John Walker, and Karli Morgenthau, was off from their previous depictions and described Carter's introduction as a "failure of writing". Alan Sepinwall of Rolling Stone said the episode was competent but not up to the standards of Marvel Studios. Sepinwall compared the episode's action to Marvel Television's Agents of S.H.I.E.L.D. since it felt "pretty utilitarian" and was "cobbled together from ideas that have been done to death elsewhere, in the hopes that the mere presence of familiar (or, in some cases, semi-familiar) faces from the MCU will make it seem brand new and thrilling". He did enjoy Brühl's performance as Zemo. Writing for Entertainment Weekly, Chancellor Agard was ambivalent on the episode, saying it moved the story forward but was not satisfying enough on its own, and felt that the show's creators were trying to stretch a two-hour film across six episodes. Agard did find the introduction of Zemo helped to complicate the Wilson/Barnes dynamic while avoiding hitting the same beats as the previous episode, and he enjoyed Zemo's assessment of Trouble Man as well as Ayo's appearance. He had a "cold and unsatisfied" feeling with the Nagel scene, even though he felt the exposition was necessary, and ultimately gave the episode a "B−". His colleague Christian Holub added, "The Falcon and the Winter Soldier is definitely playing with some interesting ideas, but I don't yet have the sense that the show knows exactly what it wants to do or say with them", feeling confused by the various story elements but intrigued about how they would conclude.

Matt Purslow's review for IGN was positive, saying the episode "efficiently unpacks many of the story's main plot threads" while also not sacrificing character development. He praised Brühl's performance, noting that his line delivery came with "a small smile and a dash of dry humor", and pointed out the similarities in the episode to the John Wick films which were created by episode writer Kolstad. Purslow concluded that after three episodes the series was "firing on all cylinders", and gave "Power Broker" a 9 out of 10. Den of Geek's Gavin Jasper gave it 4.5 out of 5 stars and felt it was a "breath of fresh air" and a true sequel to the MCU film Captain America: Civil War (2016), putting a "new spin on the same general concept". Jasper said Brühl's performance made Zemo likeable and charismatic, likening it to Tom Hiddleston's Loki in the film Thor: The Dark World (2013), and was hopeful that Marvel Studios was teasing the introduction of the Thunderbolts team from the comics. Jasper did criticize the connections to the Super Soldier Serum, feeling it was an example of the MCU refusing to move too much in a new direction.
