= Francis Fentress =

American judge (1873–1930)

Francis Fentress (November 2, 1873 – October 30, 1930) was an American lawyer and judge who served as a justice of the Tennessee Supreme Court for nine months in 1918.

== Early life, education, and career ==
Born in Bolivar, Tennessee, to son of Francis Fentress and Elizabeth Neely Fentress, he was educated at Bingham's School and later attended the University of Tennessee, Princeton University, and the law school at Cumberland University.

Fentress began practicing law in 1897, his work including the representation of the Illinois Central Railroad.

== Judicial service ==
In 1910, Fentress was elected chancellor in Memphis for Shelby County, Tennessee, a position he held for seven years. During his tenure, the chancery court heard several significant political and legal disputes in the county.

In January 1918, Governor Thomas Clarke Rye appointed Fentress to a seat on the Tennessee Supreme Court vacated created by the resignation of Justice Arthur S. Buchanan. Fentress served on the court until September 1, 1918. Contemporary accounts described him as well qualified for the position, though he did not seek reelection and instead returned to the private practice of law in Memphis after his brief tenure.

== Personal life and death ==
Fentress was a member of the Presbyterian Church (USA) and served as an elder at Idlewild Presbyterian Church in Memphis. He married Ethel Coffin, and they had three sons and one daughter who survived him.

Fentress died at his home in Johnson City, Tennessee, at the age of 56, after a lingering illness and a long-standing heart condition. He was buried at Elmwood Cemetery, in Memphis.

Political offices
Preceded by Arthur S. Buchanan	Justice of the Tennessee Supreme Court; 1918–1918	Succeeded by Court reconstituted
