= Buchanon =

Buchanon is a surname. Notable people with the name include:

- Phillip Buchanon (born 1980), American football player
- Will Buchanon (born 1983), American football player
- Willie Buchanon (born 1950), American football player

== See also ==
- Buchanan (surname)
- Buchannon
