= James Buchanan (disambiguation) =

James Buchanan (1791–1868) was the 15th president of the United States from 1857 to 1861.

James Buchanan may also refer to:

== Politics ==
- James Buchanan of Drumpellier (1726–1786), British merchant, twice Lord Provost of Glasgow
- James M. Buchanan (diplomat) (1803–1876), American jurist and diplomat
- James Buchanan (New South Wales politician) (1827–1891), Australian politician and magistrate
- James Buchanan (New Jersey politician) (1839–1900), U.S. Representative from New Jersey
- James P. Buchanan (1867–1937), American congressman from Texas
- James Buchanan, British East Pakistani official, 1st head of the paramilitary Bangladesh Ansars
- James Buchanan (Florida politician) (born 1982), American politician, member of the Florida Legislature

== Sport ==
- Jim Buchanan (baseball) (1876–1949), baseball player
- Jim Buchanan (footballer) (1898–?), Scottish professional footballer
- Jim Buchanan (long jumper) (1955–1977), Canadian Olympic athlete
- James Buchanan (New Zealand cricketer) (1856–1921), New Zealand cricketer
- James Buchanan (South African cricketer) (1908–1989), South African cricketer

== Other ==
- James M. Buchanan (1919–2013), American Nobel laureate economist
- James Buchanan (minister) (1804–1870), Church of Scotland minister and theologian
- James Buchanan, 1st Baron Woolavington (1849–1935), Scottish businessman, philanthropist, and racehorse owner and breeder
- James Buchanan (teacher) (1849–1897), Scottish teacher and founder of St. Margaret's School, Edinburgh
- James Buchanan (1785–1857), Scottish philanthropist
- James S. Buchanan (1864–1930), American educator, fourth president of the University of Oklahoma
- Sir James Buchanan, 2nd Baronet (1840–1901), British Royal Navy officer
- Jim Buchanan (violinist), American violinist, member of David Grisman Quintet

== See also ==
- James Buchanan Duke (1856–1925), American industrialist
- James Buchanan Eads (1820–1887), American engineer and inventor
- James Buchanan Macaulay (1793–1859), Canadian lawyer
- Bucky Barnes, Marvel Comics character whose full name is James Buchanan Barnes
  - Bucky Barnes (Marvel Cinematic Universe), film and TV adaptation of Marvel Comics character, also with the full name of James Buchanan Barnes
