= Buchannon =

Buchannon may refer to:

== Fictional characters ==
- Mitch Buchannon, fictional lifeguard, main character of the TV series Baywatch, played by David Hasselhoff
- Gayle Buchannon, Mitch's ex-wife, played by Wendie Malick
- Hobie Buchannon, son of Mitch and Gayle, played by Jeremy Jackson

== Music ==
- "Ballet for a Girl in Buchannon", 1970 song cycle by Chicago

== Other ==
- Buchannon Gap, a geographical feature in the Bull Run Mountains, Virginia

== See also ==
- Buchanan (disambiguation)
- Buchanon, a surname
