= Evelyne Oughtred Buchanan =

British artist

- Born: Evelyne Oughtred Watson; 21 January 1883; Stockton-on-Tees, England
- Died: 21 November 1978 (aged 95); Edinburgh
- Education: Glasgow School of Art
- Known for: Painting

Evelyne Oughtred Buchanan, née Watson, (21 January 1883–21 November 1978), was a British artist, notable for her landscape paintings.

== Biography ==
Buchanan was born in Stockton-on-Tees in the north-east of England. She attended school there before spending a single term at the Glasgow School of Art after which she moved to Newlyn in Cornwall. There, during 1910, she spent four months at the art school run by Stanhope Forbes and was greatly influenced by the work of other artists active in the area, notably Laura Knight and Lamorna Birch. Although largely self-taught as an artist, Buchanan later studied portraiture with Robert Heriot Westwater in Scotland and would eventually settle in Edinburgh. She abandoned painting for some years but resumed doing so in 1933 and continued until the early 1970s when her eyesight began to fail. She died in an Edinburgh nursing home on 21 November 1978.

Buchanan was elected a member of the Scottish Society of Women Artists in 1937 and the Society of Scottish Artists in 1939. She also exhibited at the Royal Academy, the Royal Scottish Academy and with the Society of Women Artists. In 1971 she held a joint exhibition in Edinburgh with her daughter, the artist Elspeth Buchanan, and her son-in-law, Nicholas Horsfield. Glasgow Art Gallery hold examples of her paintings.
