= Buchanan Valley =

Buchanan Valley may refer to:

- Buchanan Valley in Adams County, Pennsylvania, in the United States.
- Buchanan Valley Township, Emmons County, North Dakota, in the United States.
- Buchanan Valley, an area of Pine Valley in Halfway, Baker City, Idaho, in the United States.
