= Tracie Ching =

American artist

- Ching at Dragon Con in 2026
- Education: Windward Community College (AA)
- Known for: Illustration, Vector art, Cross-hatching
- Notable work: Biden-Harris Inaugural Poster, Kamala Harris "For the People" poster, "Kavanope"
- Awards: Clio Entertainment Award (Silver: 2021, 2022, 2024)
- Website: www.tracieching.com

Tracie Ching is an American artist and illustrator based in Washington, D.C.. She is known for a signature digital cross-hatching style inspired by classic engraving techniques. Her work spans alternative movie posters, commercial key art, and political portraiture, including the official inaugural poster for the Biden-Harris administration.

== Early life and education ==
Ching is a self-taught illustrator who began her professional career in 2011. Utilizing Adobe applications to teach herself graphic design, she specialized in complex vector-based portraiture. In 2024, she earned an Associate of Arts in Hawaiian Studies from Windward Community College.

== Career ==
Ching gained prominence creating alternative movie posters for cult classic films, a movement noted by The New York Times for its impact on fan art and film marketing. She has since designed packaging for Hasbro's G.I. Joe Classified Series and cover art for Penguin Random House, including the Stranger Things prequel novel Flight of Icarus.

In 2021, she was commissioned to create a portrait of Mary Jackson to commemorate the renaming of the Mary W. Jackson NASA Headquarters.

== Notable works ==
- Biden-Harris Inaugural Poster (2021): Official poster commissioned by the Presidential Inaugural Committee.
- Kamala Harris: For the People (2019): Official campaign poster for Kamala Harris's presidential primary campaign, held in the permanent collection of the National Portrait Gallery.
- "Kavanope" (2018): A viral protest graphic acquired by the Library of Congress.
- TIME Cover: Illustrated the "Arrested Hope" cover featuring Aung San Suu Kyi for the "100 Women of the Year" project (2020).

== Awards ==
- 2024: Silver Clio Entertainment Award for "Hunger Games - The Snow Saga Portraits".
- 2022: Silver Clio Entertainment Award for "Terminator 2 - Deluxe Steelbook".
- 2021: Silver Clio Entertainment Award for "Kickass Steelbook".

== Permanent collections ==
- National Portrait Gallery, Smithsonian Institution
- Library of Congress
- Frank Lloyd Wright Foundation
