= Robert Heriot Westwater =

Scottish artist (1905–1962)

Robert Heriot Westwater ARSA
- Born: 31 July 1905; Burntisland, Scotland
- Died: 25 November 1962 (aged 57); Southfleet, England
- Education: Royal High School, Edinburgh; Edinburgh College of Art
- Occupations: Artist, portraitist
- Notable work: Portraits of Hugh MacDiarmid and Compton Mackenzie
- Spouse: Emily Lind Maclennan

Robert Heriot Westwater ARSA (31 July 1905 - 25 November 1962) was a Scottish artist, associate of the Royal Scottish Academy and a member of the Royal Society of Portrait Painters. He is best known for his work portraiture work, especially paintings of Scottish writers Hugh MacDiarmid and Compton Mackenzie.

== Early life ==
He was educated at the Royal High School, Edinburgh, where he was Dux (or highest achieving pupil) in drawing for 1922. He went on to train at Edinburgh College of Art, receiving a postgraduate Andrew Grant fellowship. Westwater married and later divorced Scottish architect Emily Lind Maclennan (1908-1996).

== Career ==
After graduating from Edinburgh College of Art, Westwater underwent a period of travel and further study on the continent. He then returned to Edinburgh, spending ten years teaching at the College of Art. During that time, he taught Composition and Drawing from 1933 to 1934 and Life Drawing History from 1937 to 1943. In 1936, Westwater ventured for the first time into large scale mural work with the Wardie School mural Alice in Wonderland, which was commissioned under the 'Schools Beautiful' scheme led by the Edinburgh Education Committee and Edinburgh College of Art. In 1937, he took part in the Glasgow Empire Exhibition, where he contributed a mural to Basil Spense's Imperial Chemical Industries [ICI] pavilion. Following this, he also created a mural for the Musselburgh Wire Mills in 1939 in the workers' lecture hall. Westwater later moved to London where he established himself as a full-time artist. He was noted for his work as a portraitist, among his notable subjects were the Scottish writers Hugh MacDiarmid and Compton Mackenzie.

== Controversy over mural at Wardie Primary School, Edinburgh ==
In 2013, following a Heritage Lottery-funded restoration, one of the panels of the Alice in Wonderland mural at Wardie school was the subject of a Police Scotland investigation, after a parent complained over the purportedly racist content of this image. Despite calls to have the golliwog removed or painted over in the mural, the school and Edinburgh City Council maintained that the mural would remain untouched. A spokeswoman for Edinburgh City Council was quoted in an article in the Guardian, saying: "The mural is of both historical and artistic importance. While we understand the offensiveness of the image, it is in no way indicative of the attitudes of either the school or the council. Our equalities policies and approaches are robustly multicultural and anti-racist, promoting diversity and good relationships among pupils." Jeremy Howard, from the University of St Andrews and representing the Decorated School project, funded to study art and school buildings by the Arts and Humanities Research Council, also backed that decision. He stated in the same article: "This is history: if you start painting it out or get rid of it you're deceiving people about what views were prevalent in the 1930s." Wardie school now plan on using the golliwog illustration as an addition to their teaching packs from Show Racism the Red Card.
