= Janet May Buchanan =

Scottish Egyptologist

- Born: 1866; Glasgow
- Died: 8 August 1912 (aged 45–46)
- Occupation: Egyptologist

Janet May Buchanan (1866 – 8 August 1912) was a Scottish Egyptologist, whose collection efforts comprise approximately one quarter of the Egyptian artefacts in the Glasgow Museums' collections.

== Life ==
Janet May Buchanan was born in Glasgow in 1866, the daughter of George Buchanan and Janet Shaw (née Blair). Buchanan was educated at a private school in Cheltenham. On her father's death in 1906, she inherited a substantial sum, enabling the pursuit of her own interests. Among these was Egyptology.

Buchanan was the founder of two organisations for the purpose of supporting excavations: Egypt Research Students Association (with branches in both Glasgow and Edinburgh), and the Glasgow Egypt Society. In 1912, she curated Glasgow's first exhibition of Egyptian material, held at the Kelvingrove Museum. Although Buchanan was killed in a car accident just three weeks after the exhibition's opening, it continued for six months and welcomed 10,000 visitors a week.

== Death ==
Janet May Buchanan died on 8 December 1912.
