= Neville Buchanan =

British animator

Neville Buchanan (born 17 October 1959) was a stop motion animator and director based in South Wales. His style was informed by his mentor Ray Harryhausen (Jason and the Argonauts, The 7th Voyage of Sinbad) His work has been likened to Harryhausen's predecessor Willis O'Brien (King Kong) with its emphasis on meticulously detailed puppets sculpted onto armatures forwarding the narrative.

Buchanan met Harryhausen as a youth while the master was at work on the original Clash of the Titans, and eventually became a set of extra hands and eyes on that set and subsequent projects. This tutelage sped along a career in 2D & 3D animation, special effects, armature construction, production design, storyboarding, sculpting, miniatures and TV/film production crews in the UK & Wales.

Buchanan's homage to this iconic art form was reflected in his own short films & series, Omni Force, The Ultra Guardians, and his online digital content, entitled 'Forge Neutralization Squad' (FNS). His projects profess his own space opera leanings, with grotesque creatures and heroic black, female, hybrid and cyborg characters driving the story—arrayed against conglomerates epitomizing villainy. Use of hands-on miniature detail and expressive puppet nuances also figure in his work.

He has been the subject of numerous interviews in animation journals and publications and is considered part of an exclusive tier of premier animators in his field. He was given reign by Clive Barker to design and fabricate a quadruped creature with rider for the film Nightbreed. Buchanan's work can also be seen in the BBC series Space Odyssey: Voyage To The Planets.

== Death ==
Neville passed away unexpectedly on the morning of 11 August 2026, aged 66. The cause of death has not yet been publicly confirmed. Reports have suggested that it may have been related to heart or diabetes-related health issues, but this has not been independently confirmed.

== References/External links ==
- LJW (November 2012). "Neville Buchanan: Stop Motion Dramatics" (PDF). Stop Motion Magazine (18): 18–28. Archived from the original (PDF) on 19 March 2013.
- "Facebook post"."...dad passed this week..."
- Orozco, Lionel Ivan (30 March 2013). "NEVILLE BUCHANAN – Harryhausen'esque, Tippett'ish, Thunderbirds'like?". Stop Motion Works News.
- http://www.westword.com/2004-08-26/film/flick-pick/
- Connell, Mike (1 October 2001). "UpNext: Impact gets into kids TV with a sci-fi blast". Kidscreen.
- "AWN's Animation Industry Database: Motion66 Visuals". 16 February 2005.
- Neville Buchanan interview (February, 1998) http://www.sfx.co.uk/1998/02/25/sfx-issue-35/
- (Mentoring & early work) http://kidscreen.com/2001/10/01/upnext-20011001/#ixzz2svmvR4Pb
- (Ray Harryhausen tribute issue) Cinefantastique Volume #31 1/2 February 1999: p. 77
- (Glazebrook, Andrew; early production narrative) http://glazy.blogspot.com/2006/01/ultra-guardians.html
- Openshaw, Dave; Reccia, Mike;(editors); (photos: Bell, David); Sci Fi & Fantasy Models #4 January/February 1995; Puppets For Omni Force; pp. 27–29, (interview)(back cover image)
- Openshaw, Dave; Reccia, Mike; (editors); (photos: Bell, David); Sci Fi & Fantasy Models #5 March/April 1995; Models For Omni Force pp-43-45 (interview)(front cover image)
