= Bahama Buck's =

American shaved ice restaurant chain

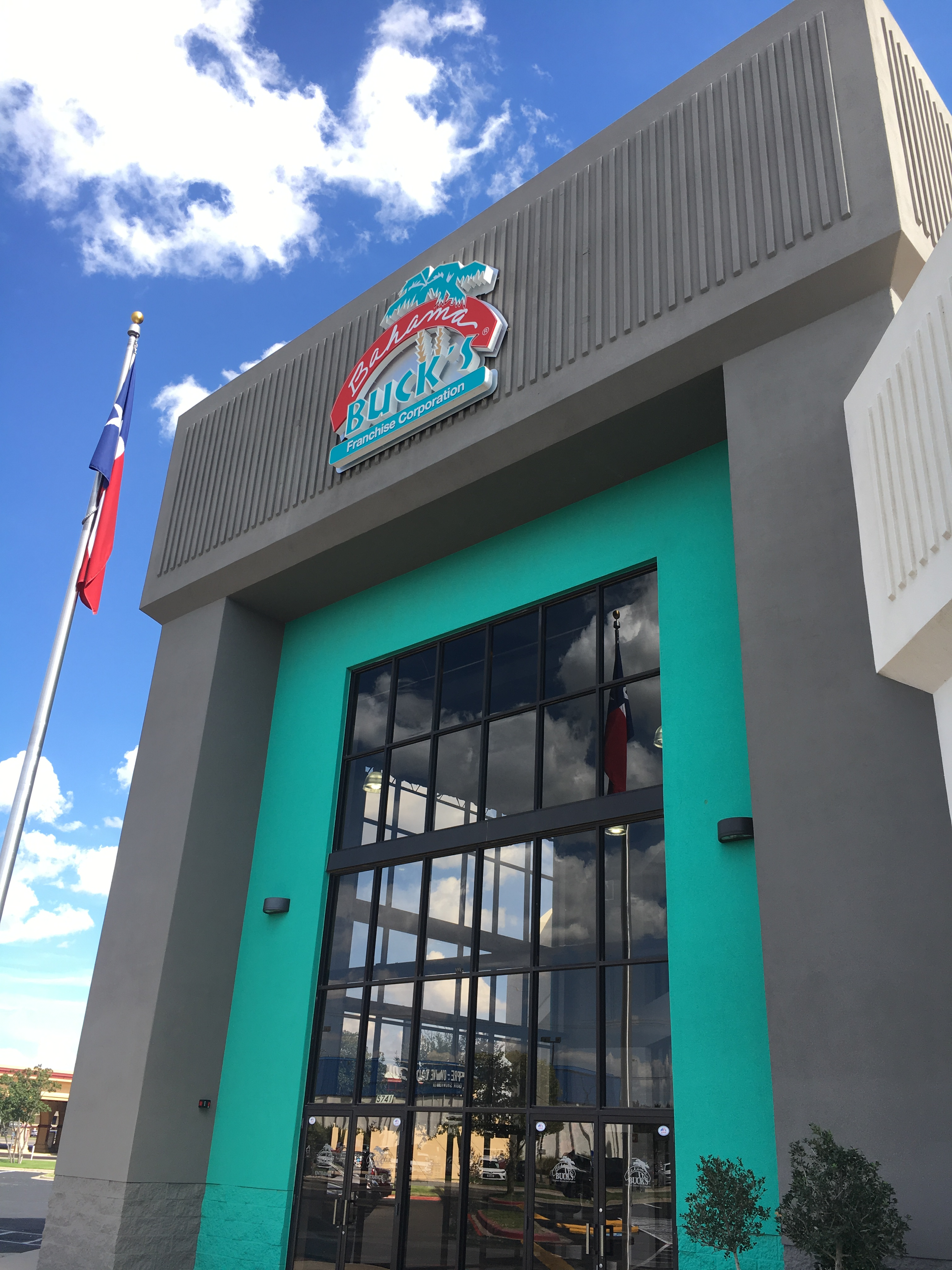
- Bahama Buck's Franchise Corporation support center in Lubbock, Texas
- Type: Private
- Industry: Restaurants
- Founded: June 12, 1990
- Founder: Blake Buchanan
- Headquarters: Lubbock, Texas
- Number of locations: 116 (2023)
- Key people: Blake Buchanan (CEO)
- Products: Shaved ice
- Website: bahamabucks.com

Bahama Buck's is a privately held franchise in the USA specializing in shaved ice and other frozen non-alcoholic beverages. The company is headquartered in Lubbock, Texas.

== History ==
In the summer of 1990, Blake Buchanan opened the first Bahama Buck's in Lubbock. He started with one ice shaver with the intention of opening a stand to work through the summer. Constructing the original store by hand, he enlisted volunteer help from three generations of his family. The first stand was staffed by Texas Tech University students.

In 1993, two more shops were opened in Tempe, Arizona. By mid-1993, Bahama Buck's Franchise Corporation was formed and began selling franchise licenses to franchisees.

Bahama Buck's was listed in the Guinness Book of World Records in 2010 for creating the world's largest shaved ice. "The Sno" weighed 25,080 lbs. and measured 15 feet 6 inches tall.

By 2022, Bahama Buck's operated over 100 stores in many states including: California, Arizona, Nevada, Utah, New Mexico, Texas, Florida, Missouri, Colorado, Oklahoma, and Puerto Rico, with over 100 additional stores planned.

Buchanan's wife, Kippi, was also announced as the COO in 2022 and Eric Lee is the CFO as of April 2023.

== Operations ==
In addition to shaved ice, Bahama Buck's also sells smoothies, red bull infusions, and specialty sodas called "Bahama Sodas" as well as various Bahama Buck's-themed clothing items. Bahama Buck's sells over 100 original shaved ice flavors including a tribute to Blake Buchanan's alma mater, Texas Tech University, called "Red Raider".
