= Cameron Buchanan (footballer) =

Scottish footballer

Personal information
- Full name: Cameron Campbell Buchanan
- Date of birth: 31 July 1928
- Place of birth: Holytown, Scotland
- Date of death: 10 September 2008 (aged 80)
- Place of death: Kirkcaldy, Scotland
- Position: Inside forward

Senior career*
Years	Team	Apps	(Gls)
1942–1949	Wolverhampton Wanderers		
1949–1955	Bournemouth	83	(19)
1955–1956	Montreal Ukrainia		
1956–1957	Norwich City	3	(0)
- * Club domestic league appearances and goals

Cameron Buchanan (31 July 1928 – 10 September 2008) was a Scottish professional footballer.

Buchanan became the youngest player to ever appear for Wolverhampton Wanderers when he played in a wartime fixture against rivals West Bromwich Albion in September 1942, aged 14 years 57 days. He played 18 wartime games in total.

He remained with the club as the Football League resumed after World War II in 1946 but never appeared in an official game for the club. He moved to Bournemouth in 1949, and over five seasons scored 18 goals in 83 games. He had a brief spell with Canadian side Montreal Ukrainia before returning to the UK with Norwich City.

He died on 10 September 2008, aged 80. He had been suffering from dementia.
