= Billy Buchanan =

Scottish footballer

Personal information
- Full name: William Mack Buchanan
- Date of birth: 29 July 1924
- Place of birth: Tannochside, Scotland
- Date of death: 14 June 1999 (aged 74)
- Place of death: Carlisle, England
- Position: Full back

Senior career*
Years	Team	Apps	(Gls)
1942–1944	Larkhall Thistle		
1944–1949	Motherwell	0	(0)
1949	Carlisle United	9	(0)
1949–1956	Barrow	242	(0)
1956–19??	Morecambe		
- * Club domestic league appearances and goals

William Mack Buchanan (29 July 1924 – 14 June 1999) was a Scottish professional footballer who played as a full back in the Football League for Carlisle United and Barrow.

Buchanan was born in Tannochside, Lanarkshire. He played football for junior club Larkhall Thistle during the Second World War before joining Motherwell in 1944, but his only first-team appearance was in the 1946–47 Scottish League Cup, and he left for England in 1949. He signed for Carlisle United and played in the first nine league matches of the season before moving on again, together with Billy Gordon and a "substantial" fee, to another Third Division North club, Barrow, in exchange for Alex McIntosh. Buchanan settled at Barrow, and over the next six-and-a-half seasons he made 242 league appearances, after which he played for Lancashire Combination club Morecambe.

Buchanan died in Carlisle, Cumbria, in 1999 at the age of 74.
