= Buchanan County =

Buchanan County is the name of three current counties in the United States of America, each named for American statesman James Buchanan during his lifetime:

- Buchanan County, Iowa
- Buchanan County, Missouri
- Buchanan County, Virginia

It is also the name of one disestablished county, also named for him, Buchanan County, Minnesota.
