= Laurence Buchanan =

English cricketer (born 1976)

Personal information
- Full name: Laurence George Buchanan
- Born: 9 March 1976 (age 50); Perivale, London, England
- Nickname: Larry
- Batting: Right-handed

Domestic team information
- Years: Team
- 1997–1998: Oxford University

Career statistics
Competition	First-class
Matches	10
Runs scored	170
Batting average	15.45
100s/50s	–/–
Top score	43*
Catches/stumpings	2/–
- Source: Cricinfo, 11 January 2020

Laurence George Buchanan (born 9 March 1976) is an English former first-class cricketer.

Bryant was born at Perivale in March 1976 and later studied at Keble College, Oxford. While studying at Oxford, he played first-class cricket for Oxford University, making his debut against Yorkshire at Oxford in 1997. He made a further nine first-class appearances across the 1997–98 seasons, scoring 170 runs at an average of 15.45 and with a high score of 43 not out.
