= Fort Buchanan (Kansas) =

- Ottawa County, Kansas

Site information
- Type: prosouthern post and town during Bleeding Kansas era
- Controlled by: various people at various times

Location
- Coordinates: 39.1071°N 97.7242°W

Site history
- Built: 1857
- In use: 1857; fall 1857 to about spring 1858; early 1859 to at least spring 1860
- Materials: wood

Garrison information
- Past commanders: Capt. Richard Mobley; later occupants considered the site to be a townsite
- Garrison: same

Fort Buchanan was built in 1857 as a combination town and fort by Capt. Richard Mobley, who was sympathetic to the cause to see Kansas Territory admitted to the Union as a slave state. Fort Buchanan was located about 1 mile (1.6 km) southwest of Minneapolis, Kansas; its exact location is unknown. The fort/town consisted of eight log cabins built around a town square.

Apparently the Mobley family occupied two of the cabins. After the death of their small child they moved to Ogden, Kansas, and the site remained abandoned until fall 1857. A family had received permission to occupy Buchanan through the winter and left sometime after the end of 1857. By March 1859 the site was again occupied and remained so until at least spring 1860. The site was gradually abandoned and some of the cabins may have been moved away. After that Buchanan was not again occupied.
