= Peter Buchanan (rugby union) =

Australian rugby union player

- Born: Peter Neave Buchanan; 11 January 1889 Wellington
- Died: 30 January 1957 (aged 68)

Rugby union career
- Position: centre
International career
Years	Team	Apps	(Points)
1923	Wallabies	1	(0)

Peter Neave Buchanan (11 January 1889 – 30 January 1957) was a rugby union player who represented Australia.

Buchanan, a centre, was born in Wellington and claimed 1 international rugby cap for Australia.
