= Bill Buchanan (computer scientist) =

Scottish computer scientist

Bill Buchanan OBE FRSE FBCS
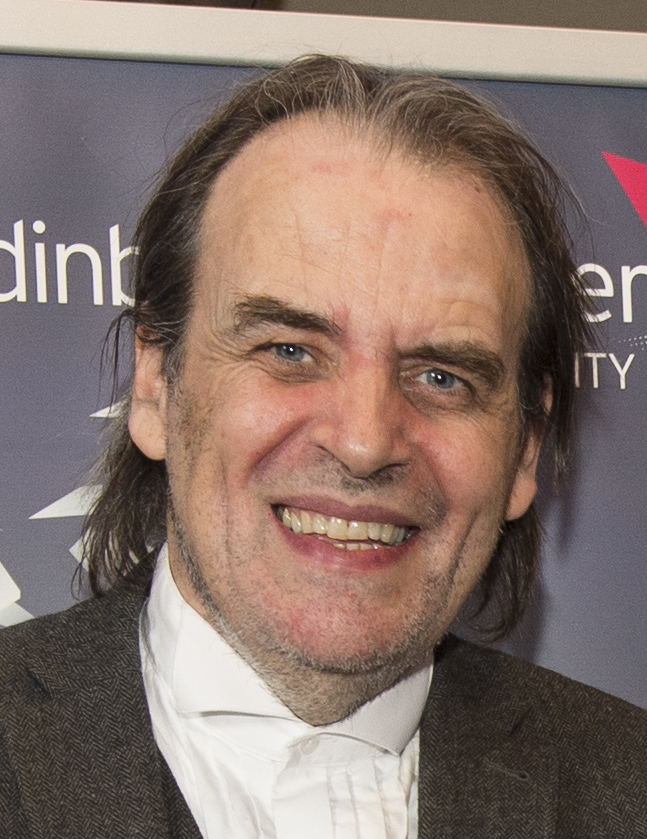
- Born: Scotland
- Education: PhD, Edinburgh Napier University, 1996
- Occupation: Professor
- Employer: Edinburgh Napier University

Bill Buchanan is a Scottish computer scientist. He is a professor at Edinburgh Napier University, where he leads the Blockpass ID Lab, and the Centre for Cybersecurity, IoT and Cyberphysical. In 2017 he received an OBE for services to cyber security.

== Career ==
Buchanan's work focuses on applied cryptography, blockchain, cybersecurity, citizen-focused health care and digital identity.

On 6 May 2015 he launched The Cyber Academy at the Merchiston Campus of Edinburgh Napier University with a goal of "bringing together industry professionals, law enforcement and academics with a view to combining strengths to combat the growing threat of criminal use of hacking software to steal money, data and intellectual property."

In November 2015, Buchanan and his team set up a fake Web site for hackers to gain access to, as part of a BBC Panorama programme. In 2016, Buchanan was also included in the FutureScot list for the "50 Scottish Tech People Who Are Changing The World".

Buchanan is the creator and sole author of the Asecuritysite.com web site. Asecuritysite was a shortlisted finalist at the Security Training Programme of the Year at the Computing Security Excellence Awards 2024.

In 2018 Buchanan was the lead academic on a project designed to improve the security of Internet of Things (IOT) devices The aim was to test how vulnerable IOT devices and networks are to hacking.

== Awards and recognition ==
- In 2015, named in the "50 most influential UK higher education professionals on social media".
- In 2015, led a cipher cracking team to win the Universally Challenged competition.
- In 2016, included in "The Digital List: 50 people from various areas of Scotland's technology industries who are changing the world".
- In 2017, appointed Officer of the Order of the British Empire (OBE) in the 2017 Birthday Honours for services to cyber security, and was the first person to receive an OBE related to cyber security.
- In 2018, awarded Advance HE Principal Fellow.
- In 2023, received the "Most Innovative Teacher of the Year" award at the Times Higher Education Awards 2023.
- In 2024, elected as a Fellow of the Royal Society of Edinburgh (FRSE).
- In 2025, winner of the Cyber Evangelist of the Year award at the Scottish Cyber Awards.
- In 2026, winner of the special 10th anniversary Security Veteran Award at computing Security Excellence Awards.
