= Peter Buchanan (architect) =

Architect and writer (1942–2023)

- Born: 16 October 1942; Zomba, Nyasaland (now Malawi)
- Died: 23 August 2023 (aged 80)
- Education: University of Cape Town
- Occupation: Architect

Peter Laurence Alexander Cockburn Buchanan (16 October 1942 – 28 August 2023) was a British architect, urbanist, writer, critic, lecturer and exhibition curator.

Buchanan is best known for his series of critical essays for The Big Rethink published by The Architectural Review and for his books on architecture.

== Life and career ==
After schooling in Zimbabwe, Buchanan studied architecture at the University of Cape Town, and after completing his degree in 1968 he worked with architects in Cape Town, first with Gabriel Fagan and then until 1971 with Revel Fox. Subsequently, he worked as architect and urban designer in Africa, Europe and the Middle East.

In 1979 Buchanan took up work with The Architects' Journal and with The Architectural Review, and in 1982 became The Architectural Review's deputy editor. Since 1992 he worked as freelancer.

Buchanan curated the travelling exhibitions Renzo Piano Building Workshop: Selected Projects and Ten Shades of Green for the Architectural League of New York. His books included works stemming from these exhibitions: the five volumes of Renzo Piano Building Workshop: Complete Works and Ten Shades of Green. Buchanan has also worked as a consultant on urban design projects and publications.

At the end of 2011, The Architectural Review launched "The Big Rethink", a year-long campaign of essays and events with at its core a series of monthly essays by Peter Buchanan. The essays are intended to involve architects in the challenges posed by the global economic and environmental crises. Architects are encouraged to re-evaluate the role of their profession, and to change architecture and design practice in order to meet the challenges posed by the crises while improving the quality of life.

Buchanan lectured and taught summer schools and master classes and lectured in a wide range of places including universities, and has published in journals of many countries.

Peter Buchanan died from lung cancer on 23 August 2023, at the age of 80.

== Publications ==
"The Big Rethink" Series of The Architectural Review (AR):

- The Big Rethink: Spiral Dynamics and Culture, 23 November 2012
- The Big Rethink: Rethinking Architectural Education, 28 September 2012
- The Big Rethink: Lessons from Peter Zumthor and other living masters, 28 August 2012 (with a review of the work of Herman Hertzberger, Renzo Piano, Emilio Ambasz and Peter Zumthor)
- The Big Rethink: Place and Aliveness: Pattern, play and the planet, 24 July 2012
- The Big Rethink: Learning from Four Modern Masters, 28 May 2012
- The Big Rethink: Transcend And include The Past, 24 April 2012 (with a discussion of the work of Christopher Alexander)
- The Big Rethink: The Purposes of Architecture, 27 March 2012
- The Big Rethink: Integral Theory, 29 February 2012 (on architecture viewed from the point of view of integral theory of Ken Wilber)
- The Big Rethink: Farewell to modernism − and modernity too, 30 January 2012
- The Big Rethink: Towards a Complete Architecture, 21 December 2011

Other publications:

- Ushering in a third industrial revolution, AR, 31 January 2012
- 1987 January: 'Corb87: Master of a misunderstood modernism', AR, 1 September 2010 (at the occasion of the centenary of Le Corbusier's birth)
- 1983 July: 'High-Tech', AR, 9 August 2010

Books:

- Peter Buchanan. Norman Foster: Free University of Berlin: The Philological Library, Prestel, 2011, ISBN 978-3791345444
- Peter Buchanan, Paul Finch, Felix Mara, Hattie Hartman, Peter Blundell Jones (and James Pallister (ed.)): The London 2012 Velodrome, Hopkins Architects, Expedition Engineering, BDSP, Grant Associates. The Architects' Journal, Emap Inform, 2011, ISBN 978-0956787712
- Anthony Sargent, Peter Buchanan: The Sage Gateshead: Foster + Partners, Prestel, 2010, ISBN 978-3791343143
- Peter Buchanan, Michele Alassio: Emilio Ambasz Casa de Retiro Espiritual, Skira, 2005, ISBN 978-8876243363
- Peter Buchanan, Frances Dunkels (and with prefaces by R.G.W. Anderson and Norman Foster): The Great Court and The British Museum, British Museum Press, 2000, ISBN 978-0714127415
- Norman Foster, Martin Pawley, Helmut Engel, Peter Buchanan: Der neue Reichstag (The new Reichstag), Brockhaus in der Wissenmedia, 1999, ISBN 978-3765320613
- P. Buchanan: Renzo Piano Building Workshop: Complete Works, Volumes 1 to 5, Phaidon Press
- P. Buchanan: Ten Shades of Green, WW Norton
- Josep Martorell, Peter Buchanan: UIA Barcelona 96 Competitions: Three Areas in Barcelona, Actar Coac Assn of Catalan Arc, 1997, ISBN 978-8489698048
- P. Buchanan: Vazquez Consuegra, Gustavo Gili, 1993, ISBN 978-8425215544
- Oriol Bohigas, Peter Buchanan, Vittorio Magnago Lampugnani: Barcelona, arquitectura y ciudad, 1980–1992. (English-language translation: Barcelona, city and architecture, 1980–1992, ISBN 0847813541)

== Awards ==
- 15th Sophia Gray Memorial Lecture Laureate (2003)

== Sources ==
- Peter Buchanan, Fundación Arquitectura y Sociedad
- Speakers 2012: Peter Buchanan, South Africa, World Architecture Festival
