= William Buchanan (pastoralist) =

Australian pastoralist and gold prospector

- Born: 21 June 1824; Dublin, Ireland
- Died: 2 May 1911 (aged 86); Mosman, New South Wales
- Spouse: Laura Eliza Connell
- Children: 5

William Frederick Buchanan (21 June 1824 – 2 May 1911) was an Australian pastoralist and gold prospector.

Buchanan was born in Dublin to Lieutenant Charles Henry Buchanan and Annie White. On 16 January 1837 the Statesman arrived in Sydney Harbour with the Buchanans and their five sons (also including Nathaniel) on board. Settling in Scone (then called Invermein), William and his father leased a cattle run in the New England area in 1839 and he later took control of the family properties. He prospected for gold in Gippsland before following one of the first rushes to Ophir in 1851; despite finding little success, he returned to New England struck by the similarity of the landscape to the gold-rich Gippsland area. Buchanan was proved correct and by 1856 the gold rush had extended to northern New South Wales.

In 1853 he relinquished his property to instead run several cattle runs on the Castlereagh River. By 1866 he had several runs near Coonamble and acquired an illustrious reputation. He was involved in trade with Britain and in 1882 moved to Narrabri, running sheep rather than cattle; he also took on leases in the Northern Territory. By this stage he was extremely wealthy and he and his brothers owned vast swathes of territory in New South Wales and the Territory. He became a life member of the Royal Colonial Institute in 1886, and after a tour of Europe wrote Australia to the Rescue (1890) in an attempt to remedy the lack of knowledge about Australia he had encountered.

Buchanan acquired the 1,000-square-mile (2,590 km^{2}) Glengyle Station in the channel country of Queensland in 1907. He intended to stock up from his Wave Hill Station in the Northern Territory, 4,000 head of cattle were immediately dispatched with Glengyle to be in good condition with plenty of feed and water.

Outside his pastoral interests he served as a magistrate from 1857. He had married Laura Eliza Connell on 31 January 1857, with whom he had five children. He is considered one of the most important Australian pastoral pioneers.
