= William Buchanan (footballer) =

Scottish footballer

Personal information
- Full name: William Duncan Buchanan
- Date of birth: 27 July 1911
- Place of birth: Balfron, Scotland
- Date of death: 1985 (aged 73–74)
- Position: Right half

Senior career*
Years	Team	Apps	(Gls)
1935–1940	Queen's Park	91	(4)

International career
1936–1939	Scotland Amateurs	5	(0)
- * Club domestic league appearances and goals

William Duncan Buchanan (27 July 1911 – 1985) was a Scottish amateur football right half who made over 90 appearances in the Scottish League for Queen's Park. He represented Scotland at amateur level.
