= Daniel Buchanan (mathematician) =

Daniel Buchanan (14 April 1880 – 1 December 1950, Vancouver) was a Canadian mathematics and astronomy professor and academic administrator.

== Biography ==
Buchanan received from McMaster University B.A. in 1906, from Hamilton College B.A. in 1906 and M.A. in 1908, and from the University of Chicago Ph.D. in 1911. He was a professor of astronomy and mathematics from 1911 to 1920 at Queen's University, Kingston, Ontario. He was elected in 1921 a Fellow of the Royal Society of Canada. At the University of British Columbia he became in 1920 professor and head of the department of mathematics and astronomy and in 1928 dean of the faculty of arts and sciences.

He was an Invited Speaker of the ICM in 1924 at Toronto and in 1928 at Bologna.

At the University of British Columbia, the Buchanan Building (built from 1956 to 1960) and the Buchanan Tower (built in 1972) are named in his honour.

== Selected publications ==
- Buchanan, Daniel (1915). "A new isosceles-triangle solution of the three body problem". Trans. Amer. Math. Soc. 16 (3): 259–274. doi:10.1090/S0002-9947-1915-1501012-9.
- Buchanan, Daniel (1919). "Asymptotic Satellites Near the Straight-Line Equilibrium Points in the Problem of Three Bodies". American Journal of Mathematics. 41 (2): 79–110. doi:10.2307/2370269. JSTOR 2370269.
- Buchanan, Daniel (1920). "Periodic Orbits on a Surface of Revolution". American Journal of Mathematics. 42 (1): 47–75. doi:10.2307/2370461. JSTOR 2370461.
- Buchanan, Daniel (1922). "Asymptotic planetoids". Trans. Amer. Math. Soc. 23 (4): 409–431. doi:10.1090/S0002-9947-1922-1501209-1.
- Buchanan, Daniel (1930). "Periodic Orbits in the Problem of Three Bodies with Repulsive and Attractive Forces". American Journal of Mathematics. 52 (4): 899–913. doi:10.2307/2370723. JSTOR 2370723.
- Buchanan, Daniel (1930). "The Problem of Three Bodies". Journal of the Royal Astronomical Society of Canada. 24: 347–358. Bibcode:1930JRASC..24..347B.
