= Bucky Barnes (Marvel Cinematic Universe) =

Character in the Marvel Cinematic Universe

- Marvel Cinematic Universe character
- Sebastian Stan as Bucky Barnes / Winter Soldier in Captain America: The Winter Soldier (2014)
- First appearance: Captain America: The First Avenger (2011)
- Based on: Bucky Barnes by: Joe Simon; Jack Kirby
- Adapted by: Christopher Markus; Stephen McFeely
- Portrayed by: Sebastian Stan

In-universe information
- Full name: James Buchanan Barnes
- Aliases: Winter Soldier; White Wolf
- Species: Human cyborg
- Title: Sergeant (U.S. Army)
- Occupation: Assassin; Soldier; U.S. representative
- Affiliation: Howling Commandos; Hydra; Avengers; Strategic Scientific Reserve; Soviet Union; Thunderbolts; United States Army; United States House of Representatives
- Weapon: Metal prosthetic arms; Captain America's shield; Various firearms; Grenade launcher; Knives
- Origin: Brooklyn, New York, United States
- Nationality: American

James Buchanan "Bucky" Barnes is a fictional character portrayed by Sebastian Stan in the Marvel Cinematic Universe (MCU) media franchise—based on the Marvel Comics character of the same name. Barnes is childhood best friends with Steve Rogers and serves alongside him in the Howling Commandos during World War II. Barnes is seemingly killed in action, but is actually captured by elements of Hydra within the Soviet Union. He is brainwashed and transformed into a super soldier with a metal arm known as the Winter Soldier. In their quest for world domination, Hydra uses a programmed Barnes as an assassin throughout the 20th century.

Barnes comes into conflict with Rogers and his allies during the Hydra uprising, eventually gaining some control over himself. However, Helmut Zemo later takes control of Barnes to destroy the Avengers. This conflict, along with internal strife over the Sokovia Accords, causes the Avengers to split up and Rogers is forced to hide Barnes in Wakanda, where Shuri eventually cures him of his programming and is given a new code name, White Wolf.

Barnes aids the Avengers in the conflict against Thanos, falling victim to the Blip. After he is restored to life, he joins the final and victorious battle against a variant of Thanos. After Rogers' retirement, Barnes is pardoned by the U.S. government and strives to make amends for his murderous past. He joins Sam Wilson in defeating the pro-Blip Flag Smashers and finds peace with Wilson. Later, Barnes is elected to the United States House of Representatives, and joins the New Avengers.

As of 2025, Barnes has appeared in nine MCU films, as well as in a lead role in the miniseries The Falcon and the Winter Soldier (2021). Stan's portrayal of the character has been met with positive reception. He is the only character who appeared in all four Captain America films.

Alternate versions of Barnes from within the MCU Multiverse appear in the animated series What If...? (2021–2024).

== Concept and creation ==
When Joe Simon created his initial sketch of Captain America for Marvel Comics precursor Timely Comics in 1940, he included a young sidekick. "The boy companion was simply named Bucky, after my friend Bucky Pierson, a star on our high school basketball team," Simon said in his autobiography. Following the character's debut in Captain America Comics #1 (March 1941), Bucky Barnes appeared alongside the title star in virtually every story in that publication and other Timely series, and was additionally part of the all-kid team the Young Allies. Live-action performances of Steve Rogers in television and film serials began within a few years after its creation, with a 1990 feature film resulting in critical and financial failure, but none of these adaptations included Bucky as a character.

In 2005, Marvel launched a new Captain America series (Volume 5) with writer Ed Brubaker, who revealed that Bucky did not die in World War II. It was revealed that after the plane exploded, General Vasily Karpov and the crew of a Russian patrol submarine found Bucky's cold-preserved body, albeit with his left arm severed. Bucky was revived in Moscow, but had brain damage with amnesia as a result of the explosion. Scientists attached a bionic arm, periodically upgrading it as technology improved. Programmed to be a Soviet assassin for Department X – under the code name the Winter Soldier – he is sent on covert wetwork missions and becomes increasingly ruthless and efficient as he kills in the name of the state.

In the mid-2000s, Kevin Feige realized that Marvel still owned the rights to the core members of the Avengers, which included Captain America and his associated characters. Feige, a self-professed "fanboy", envisioned creating a shared universe just as creators Stan Lee and Jack Kirby had done with their comic books in the early 1960s. In 2005, Marvel received a $525 million investment from Merrill Lynch, allowing them to independently produce ten films, including Captain America. Paramount Pictures agreed to distribute the film. In April 2010, Sebastian Stan, who had been mentioned in media accounts as a possibility for the title role in Captain America, was cast as Bucky Barnes. Stan was contracted for multiple films.

The origin story of Bucky Barnes follows that of the comic books, particularly Ultimate Marvel for certain elements like growing up as Steve Rogers' childhood best friend in Brooklyn instead of a younger sidekick met later. However, his story diverges from there, with "the Winter Soldier play[ing] a major role that's completely different to the comics". In the comic books, Steve Rogers is murdered in the aftermath of the Civil War storyline, leading to Bucky Barnes becoming the next Captain America. In the MCU, Rogers survives Civil War, eventually passing the mantle of Captain America to Sam Wilson in Avengers: Endgame.

== Fictional character biography ==
=== Early life and World War II ===
James Buchanan Barnes was born on March 10, 1917. He and Steve Rogers became childhood best friends and on many occasions Barnes would protect Rogers from bullies. During World War II, Barnes is drafted in the U.S. Army, while Rogers is rejected from the service due to his numerous medical conditions. Barnes fights in Europe while Rogers is chosen for the Super Soldier Program by Dr. Abraham Erskine and becomes Captain America.

In 1943, while on tour in Italy performing for active servicemen, Rogers learns that Barnes' unit was MIA in a battle against the Nazi forces of Johann Schmidt. Refusing to believe that Barnes is dead, Rogers has Peggy Carter and engineer Howard Stark fly him behind enemy lines to mount a solo rescue attempt. Rogers infiltrates the fortress of Schmidt's Nazi science division, Hydra, freeing Barnes and the other prisoners, with Barnes having just been experimented on by Hydra. Barnes becomes part of an elite unit assembled by Rogers called the Howling Commandos, participating in numerous missions against Hydra and the Nazis. However, during one such mission, Barnes falls off of a train and is seemingly killed.

=== Hydra assassin ===
The scientific experimentation that Barnes endured allows him to survive his fall, but he is recaptured by Hydra and ends up being taken to their wing inside the Soviet Union. There he is tortured, brainwashed and has his memory of his former life as Bucky Barnes wiped, turning him into the Winter Soldier, a mind-controlled super soldier with a metal prosthetic arm of superhuman strength. As the Winter Soldier, the mind-controlled Barnes commits numerous assassinations and terrorist acts throughout the 20th century, such as the assassination of John F. Kennedy, as a means for Hydra to create a singular world government under their control. In between missions, Barnes has his memory wiped again and is put into cryogenic sleep.

During the Korean War, Barnes was confronted by the American super soldier Isaiah Bradley in Goyang and half of his cybernetic arm was destroyed during the skirmish. (Note: As mentioned in The Falcon and the Winter Soldier (2021).)

In 1991, Hydra uses Barnes to kill Howard and Maria Stark in an assassination made to look like a car accident, during which he steals a case of super soldier serum from their car. (Note: As depicted in Captain America: Civil War (2016).)

In 2009, Barnes was sent on a mission to assassinate a nuclear scientist in Odessa. S.H.I.E.L.D. agent Natasha Romanoff attempted to protect the scientist, but Barnes managed to kill the scientist by shooting a round through Romanoff's stomach while she covered him. (Note: As mentioned in Captain America: The Winter Soldier (2014).)

In 2014, Barnes, still operating as the Winter Soldier, leads a group of assailants to ambush Nick Fury in Washington, D.C. Later, Barnes attacks Fury in Rogers' apartment, but escapes before Rogers can catch him. Rogers discovers a Hydra plot to use three Helicarriers to sweep the globe, using satellite-guided guns to eliminate every individual who is a threat to Hydra. Rogers, Romanoff, and Sam Wilson are ambushed on the highway by Barnes, who kills Jasper Sitwell. After a fight with Romanoff and Rogers, Barnes' mask is removed and Rogers recognizes him as Barnes. Barnes is taken back to the base by Brock Rumlow and other agents, remembering Rogers, but gets put back under mind control. Rogers and Wilson later storm two Helicarriers and replace their controller chips, but Barnes destroys Wilson's suit and fights Rogers on the third Helicarrier. Rogers fends him off and replaces the final chip. Rogers refuses to fight Barnes in an attempt to reach his friend, but as the ship collides with the Triskelion, Rogers is thrown out into the Potomac River. Barnes, freed from Hydra's mind control, rescues the unconscious Rogers before disappearing into the woods. Later, Barnes visits his own memorial in the Captain America exhibit at the Smithsonian Institution.

=== Dealing with brainwashing ===
In 2016, Barnes has taken up residence in Bucharest, Romania. He learns that he has been framed by ex-Sokovian special forces soldier Helmut Zemo for a bombing in Vienna that kills King T'Chaka of Wakanda. Rogers and Wilson find Barnes and attempt to protect him from T'Chaka's vengeful son, T'Challa, but all four, including T'Challa, are apprehended by the police and James Rhodes. With Barnes in custody, Zemo impersonates a psychiatrist and recites the Hydra brainwashing words to make Barnes obey him. He sends Barnes on a rampage to cover his own escape. Rogers stops Barnes and hides him. (Note: As depicted in the post-credits scene of Ant-Man (2015).) When Barnes regains his senses, he explains to Rogers and Wilson that Zemo is the real Vienna bomber and wanted the location of the Siberian Hydra base, where other brainwashed "Winter Soldiers" are kept in cryogenic stasis. Unwilling to wait for authorization to apprehend Zemo, Rogers and Wilson go rogue, and recruit Wanda Maximoff, Clint Barton, and Scott Lang to their cause. Tony Stark assembles a team composed of Romanoff, T'Challa, Rhodes, Vision, and Peter Parker to stop them. Stark's team intercepts Rogers' team at Leipzig/Halle Airport in Germany, where they fight until Romanoff allows Rogers and Barnes to escape. Rogers and Barnes go to the Siberian Hydra facility, when Stark arrives and strikes a truce with them. They find that the other super soldiers have been killed by Zemo, who then reveals himself and shows them footage of the 1991 car accident where Barnes killed Stark's parents as the Winter Soldier. Enraged that Rogers kept this from him, Stark turns on them both, leading to an intense fight in which Stark destroys Barnes' robotic arm and Rogers disables Stark's armor. Rogers departs with Barnes, leaving his shield behind. Later, Barnes, granted asylum in Wakanda, chooses to return to cryogenic sleep until a cure for his brainwashing is found.

Sometime later, Barnes is cured by T'Challa's sister, Shuri and is given a new code name - White Wolf.

As proof that he is cured, Barnes is taken to a cave where the trigger words' effect is shown to be nullified by Ayo. (Note: As depicted in a flashback in the episode, The Whole World Is Watching of The Falcon and the Winter Soldier (2021).)

=== Infinity War and resurrection ===
In 2018, Barnes, while still living on a farm in Wakanda, is given a new vibranium arm by T'Challa. He goes to the Golden City where he reunites with Rogers after he, Wilson, Romanoff, Maximoff, Vision, Rhodes, and Bruce Banner arrive. He then joins the battle against the Outriders and witnesses Thor, Rocket Raccoon, and Groot's arrival. When Thanos arrives, completes the Infinity Gauntlet, and snaps his fingers, Barnes becomes the first person in Wakanda who disintegrates in the Blip.

In 2023, Barnes is restored to life and brought via portal by the Masters of the Mystic Arts to the destroyed Avengers Compound to the battle against an alternate Thanos. A week later, he attends Stark's funeral and with Wilson and Banner, sees Rogers off, who returns the alternate Infinity Stones and Mjolnir to their timelines. When Banner is unable to bring Rogers back, Barnes points Wilson to a nearby park bench, and watches as an elderly Rogers passes his mantle to Wilson.

=== Partnering with Sam Wilson ===
In 2024, Barnes is living in Brooklyn, New York. He has been pardoned and attends government-mandated therapy, where he discusses his attempts to make amends for his time as the Winter Soldier. He has nightmares about his past, but is not forthcoming with his therapist about them. She notes that Barnes is isolating himself from his friends and has been ignoring texts from Wilson. Barnes tells her that he made amends, including confronting a formerly Hydra-affiliated U.S. senator whom he helps bring to justice. He also befriends an elderly Japanese man named Yori, the father of one of the Winter Soldier's victims, but doesn't tell him of their connection. Yori sets Barnes up on a date with a bartender named Leah, which ends quickly after she brings up Yori's deceased son and Barnes leaves.

Barnes watches the news and finds out that John Walker has been named the new Captain America by the U.S. government. He tracks Wilson down at a United States Air Force base, expressing his disapproval about Wilson's decision on having surrendered Rogers' shield. Barnes joins Wilson and his friend, Joaquin Torres, in tracking down the Flag Smashers in Munich where they intercept the group smuggling medicine and attempt to rescue a supposed hostage that ends up being their leader, Karli Morgenthau. Barnes and Wilson are overwhelmed by the Flag Smashers who are revealed to be super soldiers. Walker and his partner, Lemar Hoskins, come to their aid, although the Flag Smashers escape. Walker asks Barnes and Wilson to join him in aiding the Global Repatriation Council (GRC) to quash the ongoing violent post-Blip revolutions, but they refuse. Traveling to Baltimore, Barnes introduces Wilson to Isaiah Bradley, a veteran American super soldier Barnes fought during the Korean War, and his grandson Eli, but Isaiah refuses to help them uncover information about additional super soldier serums due to his disdain for Barnes and having been imprisoned and experimented on by the government for thirty years. After leaving the house, Barnes is arrested for missing a court-mandated therapy appointment, but is released when Walker intervenes. Refusing to work with Walker, Barnes suggests they visit Zemo.

==== Zemo and the Dora Milaje ====
Barnes and Wilson travel to Berlin to meet Zemo to gather intelligence related to the super soldier Flag Smashers. Barnes orchestrates a prison riot to help Zemo escape, after Zemo agrees to help. Barnes and Wilson are taken by Zemo via Zemo's plane to Madripoor in an effort to locate the source of the new super soldier serum. In a bar, to avoid suspicion from the criminals there, Barnes pretends to once again be under mind control as the Winter Soldier, and dispatches numerous armed thugs. They are taken to high-ranking criminal, Selby, who reveals the Power Broker hired former Hydra scientist Dr. Wilfred Nagel to recreate the serum. When Wilson's disguise is compromised, Selby orders her men to attack them but she is killed. The three escape and get pursued by bounty hunters, but are rescued by Sharon Carter. She agrees to help them after Wilson offers to get her pardoned. They travel to Nagel's lab and confront him. He reveals that he made twenty vials of the serum and that Morgenthau stole them. Zemo unexpectedly kills Nagel and the lab is destroyed. Barnes, Wilson, and Carter fight more bounty hunters until Zemo acquires a getaway car and they escape. After Wilson receives a lead from Torres, Barnes, Wilson, and Zemo travel to Latvia. Barnes recognizes Wakandan Kimoyo Beads on the street and leaves the others to find Dora Milaje Ayo, who demands Zemo.

Barnes is questioned by Ayo on why Zemo is free and gives him eight hours to use Zemo before the Wakandans take him. Barnes returns to Wilson and Zemo in Zemo's penthouse, and ask locals as to where Donya Madoni's funeral is, but find the locals to be Flag Smasher sympathizers. Barnes and Wilson follow Zemo after he gets a girl to provide them with the location and are met by Walker and Hoskins on the way. After Walker interrupts Wilson's attempts to talk to Morgenthau, Barnes chases her but loses her. Barnes, Wilson, and Zemo return to the penthouse but are followed by Walker and Hoskins. Ayo and the Dora Milaje arrive after for Zemo and after Walker refuses to hand him over, and Barnes intercedes, Ayo uses a failsafe that deactivates his vibranium arm. Once the Dora leave, Barnes puts his arm back on, to his and Wilson's surprise.

==== Defeating the Flag Smashers ====
Barnes and Wilson learn Zemo escaped and after Wilson receives a call from his sister, go to meet Morgenthau. However, after learning Walker's location, they leave to intercept him. Barnes and Wilson engage in a fight against the Flag Smashers at Walker's location, but Morgenthau accidentally kills Hoskins. Barnes and Wilson witness as Walker, having taken a supersoldier serum and enraged by Hoskins' death, uses his shield to kill one of the Flag Smashers in front of horrified bystanders, who film his actions.

Wilson and Barnes demand the shield from Walker, starting a fight in which Walker destroys Wilson's wingsuit. The fight ends with Wilson and Barnes taking the shield and breaking Walker's arm. Afterwards, Barnes and Wilson meet up with Torres at the GRC refugee camp. Barnes leaves and finds Zemo in Sokovia and hands him over to the Dora Milaje and asks Ayo for a favor. Later, Barnes arrives in Wilson's hometown in Louisiana and delivers a briefcase from the Wakandans to Wilson. He meets Wilson's sister, Sarah, and her two sons. After fixing the Wilson family's boat, Barnes and Wilson train with the shield and agree to move on from their pasts and work together. Barnes confesses that he was angry that Wilson gave away Captain America's shield because he feels like it is his last connection to the past, and apologizes for not considering the implications of giving the shield to a black man.

Barnes goes back to New York City and runs into Carter, who was called in by Wilson. He fights against the Flag Smashers and saves GRC hostages from arson. During a fight against Morgenthau, Barnes falls off the ledge to a riverbank. After Walker and the Flag Smashers do the same, Barnes helps Walker up and they join Wilson, who is in his new Captain America suit, to find the Flag Smashers after Georges Batroc helps them escape. Barnes and Walker ambush three of them and see them taken into custody. After the GRC members are rescued, Barnes listens to Wilson's speech, before leaving with an injured Carter to get medical help. He then goes to Yori's apartment and tells him that he, as the Winter Soldier, killed his son. He delivers his completed notebook to his therapist's office and sees Leah again, before leaving for Louisiana. There he joins Wilson, Sarah, her sons, and the community for a cookout and opts to remain there with Wilson.

In December 2025, Barnes is met by Nebula who takes his vibranium arm to give to Rocket as a Christmas present. (Note: As mentioned in The Guardians of the Galaxy Holiday Special (2022).)

=== Congressional campaign and joining a team ===
Some time later, Barnes decides to run for United States Congress, representing a Brooklyn constituency. In 2027, Barnes meets with Wilson at the Walter Reed National Military Medical Center to support him and Torres, who was in the center getting medical treatment.

Having won the election, Barnes attends a congressional impeachment trial for CIA director Valentina Allegra de Fontaine due to a series of illegal operations. Attending a charity gala thrown by de Fontaine, Barnes speaks with de Fontaine's assistant Mel about the evidence she is hiding and convinces her to become an informant. After being tipped off by Mel, Barnes tracks her phone to Utah and rescues Walker, Yelena Belova, Ava Starr, and Alexei Shostakov from de Fontaine's agents, capturing them to testify at the impeachment trial. Upon receiving a call from Mel, who explains that a man named Bob was the subject of one of de Fontaine's top-secret experiments, Barnes decides to take the group with him to stop her. They arrive at the Watchtower and discover that de Fontaine has transformed Bob into an immensely powerful superhuman known as the Sentry, who overpowers the team, causing them to retreat. Seeing that the Sentry has become the Void, which begins turning everyone around him into shadows and engulfing New York City in an unearthly darkness, Barnes and the team fight their way into the Void's dimension, searching for Belova and Bob's good counterpart, eventually leading them to Bob's initial experimentation. After being incapacitated, Barnes and the team break free to help Bob avoid being consumed by the darkness, reminding him that he is not alone, and managing to overcome the Void, restoring light and normalcy to the city. Barnes and the others plot to capture de Fontaine, who then manipulates public perception by staging a press conference in which she rebrands them as the New Avengers.

In 2028, Barnes talks to Wilson, but the conversation goes poorly since Wilson is upset with the new team's name as he already restarted the Avengers. Now with a new suit and headquartered at the Watchtower, Barnes and the New Avengers discuss how Wilson is filing for trademark infringement, until they receive a distress signal from space over satellite imagery revealing a massive extra-dimensional spaceship with a large "4" emblem entering their universe.

== Alternate versions ==
Several alternate versions of Barnes appear in the animated series What If...?, with Stan reprising his role.

=== Fighting alongside Captain Carter ===
In an alternate 1943, Barnes fights alongside Captain Peggy Carter, Rogers, and the Howling Commandos during World War II.

After the war, Barnes and Rogers hunt down and destroy every HYDRA base in the world. In 1953, they complete their last mission, but Rogers is supposedly killed.

By 2014, an elderly Barnes has become the Secretary of State of the United States. Following a meeting with the World Security Council, Barnes is met by Brock Rumlow and other agents who come to escort him to safety after a brainwashed Rogers arrives to assassinate him. Although shocked by his friend's survival and brainwashed state, Barnes provides Carter with information on the new power source that had been developed for the Hydra Stomper armor, allowing her to disable it. Watching Carter and Natasha Romanoff fly off with a captured Rogers, Barnes wishes them luck in saving his best friend.

=== Zombie outbreak ===
In an alternate 2018, Barnes is one of the remaining survivors on Earth after a quantum virus outbreak. While journeying to Camp Lehigh in search of a cure, Barnes is forced to kill a zombified Rogers and claims his shield. At the camp, the group fights a zombified Maximoff, and Barnes is left behind when he is telekinetically thrown away by Maximoff.

=== 1980s Avengers vs. Ego ===
In an alternate 1988, Barnes is recruited along with Hank Pym, Bill Foster, Dr. Wendy Lawson, and King T'Chaka to stop a young Peter Quill who was sent by his father Ego to prepare Earth for his expansion. Unlike his mainstream counterpart, this version of Barnes appears to serve the Soviet Union rather than HYDRA. They locate Peter in Coney Island and try to subdue him, but have to escape. However, they are saved by Thor. After the team meets at S.H.I.E.L.D.'s base, Barnes accompanies Pym and Lawson to Missouri. Under orders from his Russian commander Vasily Karpov, he prepares to assassinate Quill, but is stopped by Howard Stark's communication interference who tells him that Rogers believed in him which triggers the real Barnes under his programming. Barnes then abandons his Winter Soldier persona and is last mentioned to be "in the wind."

=== Merry Man Barnes ===
In an alternate 1602, Barnes becomes friends with Rogers and Lang, joining them on their Robin Hood-like missions. One day, they stop a carriage carrying Loki to steal food, but are met by Captain Carter. They go to a pub, but are forced to leave after Happy Hogan and the Royal Yellowjackets attack to arrest Carter. Barnes, Rogers, and Lang later meet Carter, Stark, and Banner to discuss a plan to take Thor's Scepter. They infiltrate the courtroom and while Carter confronts Thor, Barnes engages in a fight with the Red Skull, aided by Rogers. Barnes then witnesses the reveal that Rogers is the time-displaced person setting off the incursion and watches as Carter sends him home, before being sent home as well.

=== Gamma War ===
In an alternate 2024, Barnes worked closely with Wilson, who was Captain America, and Monica Rambeau. On Rambeau's request, Barnes located Banner's coordinates. Barnes joined Wilson and Rambeau in the battle of New York, teaming with Shang-Chi, Marc Spector/ Moon Knight, Nakia, and the Red Guardian using the Mighty Avenger Protocol against the Apex Hulk and its gamma army. After getting overpowered, he and the others watched as Banner arrived and turned into the Mega-Hulk to defeat the Apex.

=== Fighting alongside Red Guardian ===
In an alternate 1991, Barnes is sent to recover a case of super-soldier serum from Howard and Maria Stark. Barnes is stopped by Alexei Shostakov while trying to kill the Starks and only a single vial of the serum is acquired. Without extraction, the duo tracks a spy named "Rook" to Las Vegas for transport while evading the authorities and Bill Foster. Barnes is called by Dreykov who secretly tells him to kill Shostakov, who has become a liability. Upon arriving in Las Vegas, Barnes and Shostakov discover that Rook is Obadiah Stane, who provided the Russians with information about the serum to eliminate the Starks from the market. Stane attacks the duo, but is killed by Barnes. Fleeing the authorities and a task force sent by the Red Room invade the area, Barnes buys Shostakov time to escape, who destroys the last vial of the serum. Some time later, Barnes is taken back to Hydra's base in Siberia, where he insists to Dreykov that Shostakov died a hero, before being brainwashed.

== Characterization ==
In Captain America: The First Avenger, Barnes is a sergeant in the United States Army, the best friend of Steve Rogers, and member of his squad of commandos. Stan has signed on for "five or six pictures". He revealed that he did not know anything about the comic books, but watched a lot of documentaries and films about World War II in preparation for the role, calling Band of Brothers "very helpful". About the role, Stan stated, "Steve Rogers and Bucky are both orphans and kind of like brothers. They kind of grow up together and look after each other. It's a very human, relatable thing... I also wanted to look out for how their relationship changes once Steve Rogers becomes Captain America. There's always a competition and they're always one-upping each other. I paid attention to how Bucky is affected by Steve's change and suddenly Steve is this leader".

Bucky re-emerges in Captain America: The Winter Soldier as an enhanced, brainwashed assassin after supposedly being killed in action during World War II. Regarding the character, producer Kevin Feige said, "Winter Soldier has been methodically, almost robotically, following orders for 70 years." Stan said despite his nine-picture deal with Marvel Studios including his appearance in The First Avenger, he was not sure that Bucky would make an imminent return, and only heard the sequel's official title was "The Winter Soldier" through a friend attending San Diego Comic-Con. Stan endured five months of physical training to prepare for the role and did historical research, stating, "I dove into the whole Cold War thing. I looked at the KGB. I looked at all kinds of spy movies, and all kinds of documentaries about that time, and what it was about. I grabbed anything from that time period. Anything about brainwashing". Stan also practiced daily with a plastic knife in order to be able to do the Winter Soldier's knife tricks without the aid of a stuntman. Regarding Bucky's transition into the Winter Soldier, Stan said, "You know, the truth of the situation is although he looks very different and there's different things about him, it still comes from the same person. I think you'll get to see that no matter what. I think part of my goal here was to make sure that you see an extension of that version but just a different color of that same version in a way. I think he's still the same guy; he's cut from the same cloth". Stan stated he felt the character's introduction in The Winter Soldier was "a preview of the guy", with more aspects of the character being explored in the film's sequel Captain America: Civil War.

This portrayal continues in Captain America: Civil War as an amalgam of Barnes and the Winter Soldier, with Stan saying, "here's the guy when you merge the two. This is what came out. To me, he's never really going to be Bucky Barnes again. There's going to be recognizable things about him, but his path through the [experiences of] Winter Soldier is always going to be there, haunting him." Because of this, the character has more lines in the film than in Winter Soldier. In Black Panther, Sebastian Stan makes an uncredited appearance in a post-credits scene, reprising his role as Barnes, being helped by Shuri to recover from his Hydra conditioning. In Avengers: Infinity War, Barnes is given the name White Wolf by the people of Wakanda, who helped remove his Hydra programming. Barnes is one of the many characters disintegrated by Thanos with the Infinity Gauntlet at the end of Infinity War who then returns to participate in the final battle at the end of Avengers: Endgame.

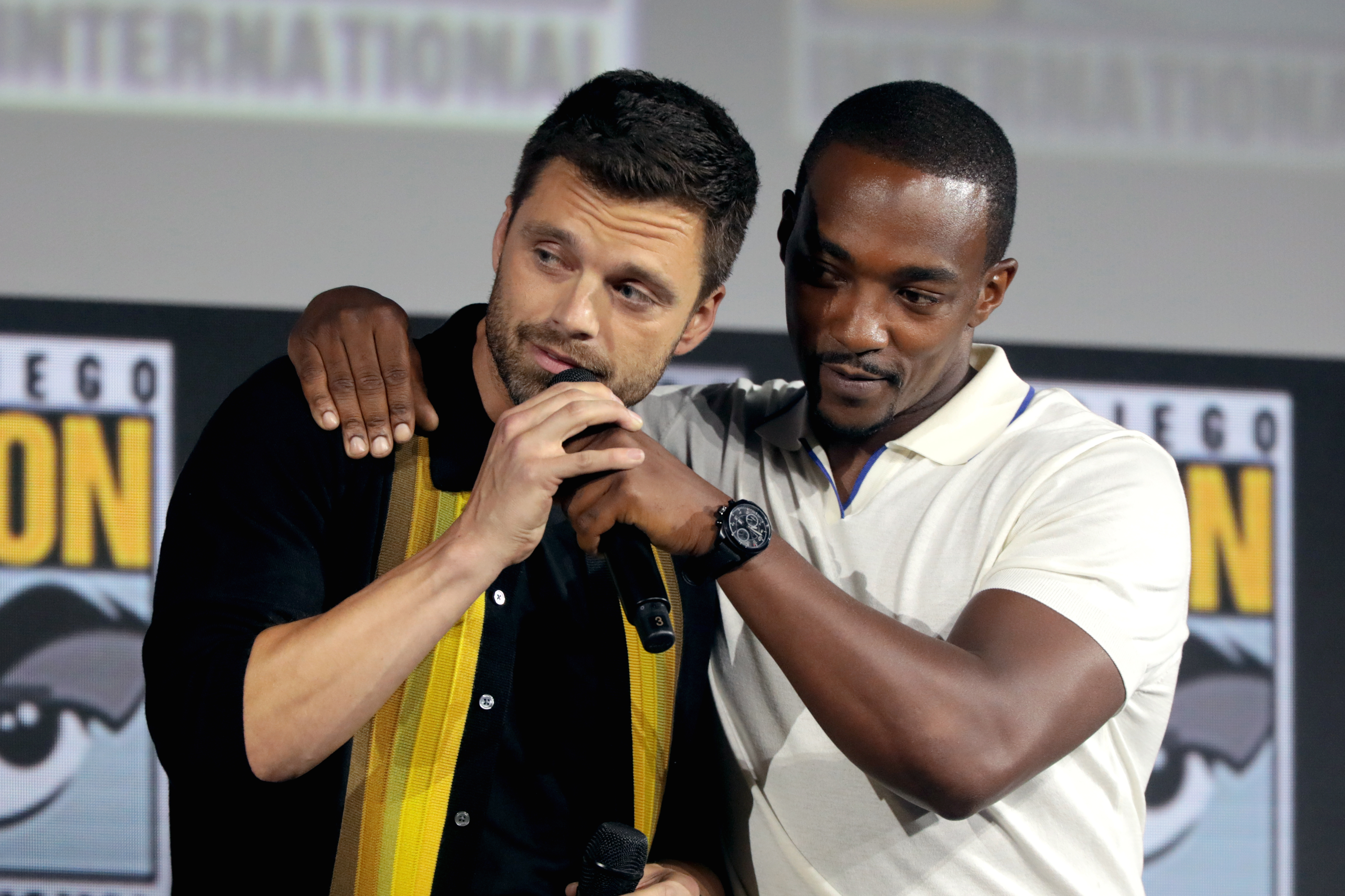
Sebastian Stan and Anthony Mackie at The Falcon and the Winter Soldier 2019 ComicCon panel

The character returned in The Falcon and the Winter Soldier, an American web television miniseries created for Disney+ by Malcolm Spellman, based on the characters. The events of the series take place six months after Avengers: Endgame. The series is produced by Marvel Studios, with Spellman serving as head writer and Kari Skogland directing. Anthony Mackie and Sebastian Stan reprise their roles as Falcon and Winter Soldier, respectively, from the film series. Daniel Brühl, Emily VanCamp, and Wyatt Russell also star. As of September 2018, Marvel Studios was developing a number of limited series for Disney+, centered on supporting characters from the MCU films, with Spellman hired to write one on Falcon and Winter Soldier in October. The series was officially confirmed in April 2019 along with Mackie and Stan's involvement. Skogland was hired the next month. Filming began in October 2019 in Atlanta, Georgia and was suspended in March 2020 due to the COVID-19 pandemic. Filming resumed in Atlanta in September before wrapping in the Czech Republic in October.

== Reception ==
Owen Gleiberman of Entertainment Weekly stated that "Sebastian Stan puts Steve's old pal Bucky Barnes through a chilling transformation". In 2014, in a review of the film Captain America: The Winter Soldier, Jake Coyle of the Associated Press felt that the character's limited development in the film, due to his true identity being "mysterious" was "the film's biggest misstep" since he is named in the film's title. He was critical of the film overall stating that it was "zippy but hollow" with "no shelf life". In Coyle's 2018 review of Avengers: Infinity War, he praised the ensemble cast overall, which features the character in a limited role, writing that Marvel had gone "nuclear". Ed Brubaker, who introduced the Winter Soldier in the Captain America (vol. 5) comic book series, has expressed dissatisfaction with Marvel's compensation for his work. In an interview with Indie Wire about the character, Stan said "I have a lot of fans that reach out, writing about trauma and telling me about certain situations that they're going through and feeling empowered."

=== Awards and nominations ===
List of awards and nominations received by Bucky Barnes
Year	Award	Category	Recipient(s)	Result	Ref.
2015	MTV Movie & TV Awards	Best Fight (shared with Chris Evans)	Captain America: The Winter Soldier	Nominated	
2016	Teen Choice Awards	Choice Movie Chemistry	Captain America: Civil War	Nominated	
2017	Kids' Choice Awards	#SQUAD	Captain America: Civil War	Nominated	
2021	MTV Movie & TV Awards	Best Duo	Sam Wilson (Anthony Mackie) and Barnes (Stan) (for The Falcon and the Winter Soldier)	Won	
2025	Kids' Choice Awards	Favorite Butt-Kicker	Thunderbolts*	Nominated	
