= Arthur S. Buchanan =

American judge (1856–1919)

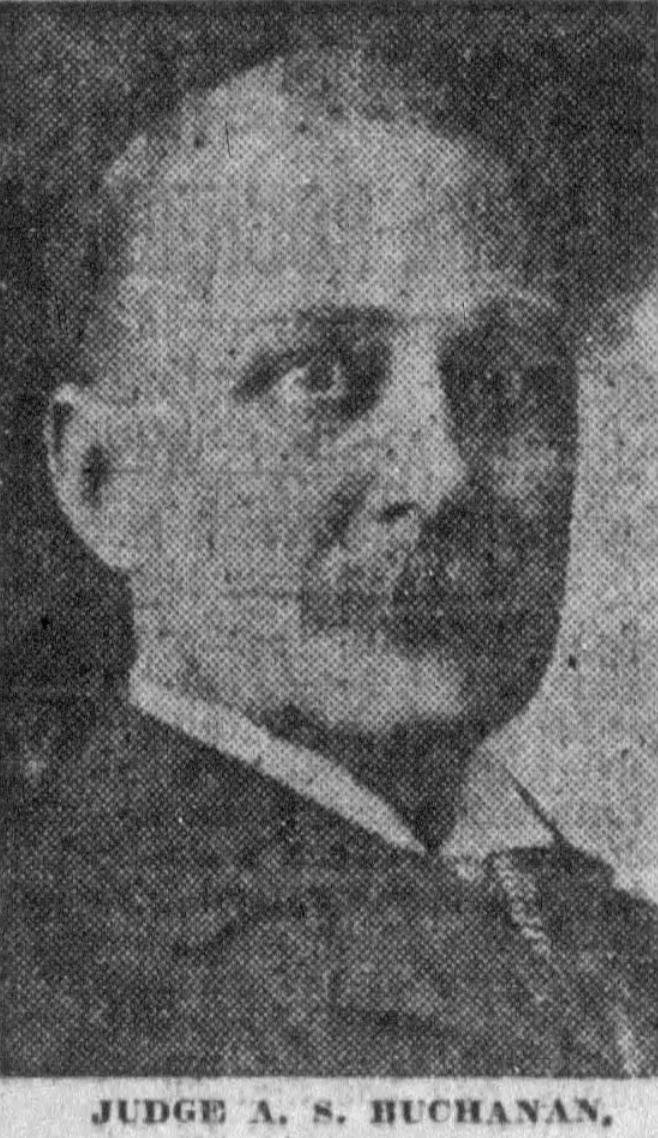
Justice Arthur S. Buchanan.

Arthur Stillingfleet Buchanan (August 14, 1856 – December 25, 1919) was a justice of the Tennessee Supreme Court from 1910 to 1918.

== Biography ==
Born in DeSoto County, Mississippi to Benjamin B. and Eliza (Smith) Buchanan, Buchanan received an LL.B. from the University of Mississippi in 1879 and gained admission to the bar that same year.

He served in the Mississippi House of Representatives in 1885 and 1886, moving to Memphis, Tennessee in 1887. On December 17, 1910, Governor Malcolm R. Patterson appointed Buchanan to fill a seat on the Tennessee Supreme Court vacated by the death of William Dwight Beard. Buchanan was elected to the seat in his own right in 1912, running unopposed. He resigned on January 1, 1918, due to ill health and a desire to return to private practice in Memphis.

Following his resignation from the court, he represented clients including the Guaranty Bank & Trust Company, Mississippi Delta Planting Company, Empire Planting Company, and Delta Farms Company.

== Personal life and death ==
Buchanan and his wife "occupied a prominent place in society both in Nashville and Memphis". Buchanan died in his home in Memphis at the age of 63.

Political offices
Preceded by William Dwight Beard	Justice of the Tennessee Supreme Court; 1910–1918	Succeeded by Francis Fentress
