= Peter Buchanan (judge) =

Australian judge (1943–2014)

The Honourable Justice Peter Buchanan (11 October 1943 – 19 May 2014) was a judge of the Supreme Court of Victoria, the highest court in Victoria, a state of Australia. Buchanan was appointed a judge of the court on 27 October 1997; he retired in October 2013. At the time of his retirement, Buchanan was, and remains, the longest-serving member of the Court of Appeal. Buchanan died on 19 May 2014.

== Education and career ==
After finishing high school at the Scotch College in Melbourne, Mr. Buchanan studied Arts and Law at the Australian National University. He then obtained a PhD at the University of London in the areas of wills and trusts.

On his return to Melbourne, Buchanan became a QC and participated in a number of high-profile cases, including the one which concerned Albert Park.

== Notable cases ==
Buchanan has been involved in a number of significant cases in Victoria. In July 2003, Buchanan along with Justice Stephen Charles granted a stay of order made earlier by Justice Phillip Mandie against John Elliott, a prominent Australian businessman. The effect was to allow Elliot to continue managing several family-owned companies and a directorship. The order was made there would be "a potentially severe disruption" to the trading activities of the companies if the stay wasn't granted.

In August 2005, Buchanan along with Justice Geoffrey Nettle granted leave to appeal a decision against Danny Nalliah and Daniel Scot, and a Christian organisation called "Catch the Fire Ministries". The decision against those persons was the first decision under Victoria's racial vilification laws (the Racial and Religious Tolerance Act) in the Victorian Civil and Administrative Tribunal (VCAT).

In December 2006, Buchanan with Justices Chris Maxwell and Frank Vincent upheld an appeal by Jack Thomas (commonly referred to as "Jihad Jack") against his conviction for terrorism related offences. Thomas was accused of accepting money and a plane ticket from an Al-Qaida terrorist. The court found that Thomas's interview with the Australian Federal Police was not voluntary, and as a result, ordered a retrial for Thomas.

== Sources ==
- Homepage - Supreme Court of Victoria http://www.supremecourt.vic.gov.au
- Who's Who Australia 2005.
