= Hiroim =

- Hiroim the Shamed; Art by Jim Cheung

Publication information
- Publisher: Marvel Comics
- First appearance: The Incredible Hulk vol. 3 #92 (April 2006)
- Created by: Greg Pak; Carlo Pagulayan

In-story information
- Alter ego: Hiroim the Oldstrong
- Species: Sakaaran Shadow People
- Place of origin: Sakaar
- Team affiliations: Warbound; Shadow Guard
- Notable aliases: Hiroim the Shamed, Hiroim the Last Oldstrong
- Abilities: Oldstrong power. Shadow Warrior martial techniques, and strategic skills.

Hiroim is a fictional character appearing in American comic books published by Marvel Comics. The character is depicted usually as a supporting character in Hulk books.

== Publication history ==
Hiroim first appeared in Incredible Hulk vol. 3 #92 (April 2006), and was created by writer Greg Pak and artist Carlo Pagulayan.

== Fictional character biography ==
Originally, Hiroim was a Shadow Priest, dedicated to the story of the Sakaarson — who would unite the people of Sakaar — and trained to join the other Shadows. However, for believing that he could be the Sakaarson, he was expelled from the order. He was chosen to be the personal guard of the Red King and uphold an alliance between the Shadows and the Empire. He broke this vow when the Emperor ordered Hiroim to kill his adolescent son, due to the belief that he would bring ruin and devastation to Sakaar. For breaking that oath, he ended up in the Empire's gladiator training school, the Maw, where he fought alongside such other warriors as Miek, No-Name the Brood, Korg, and the Hulk. After two victories in the arena, Hiroim formed a Warbound pact with them, vowing that they would always stand together. Having been freed from their obedience disks by the Silver Surfer, the Warbound went on to vanquish the Red King, Hiroim concluding that the Hulk was the true Sakaarson. Following Caiera's death, Hiroim inherits her ability to manipulate the Oldpower.

After the Hulk's shuttle explodes and destroys Sakaar, Hiroim absorbs the powers of the Sakaar Shadow Priests and accompanies the Hulk to Earth to wage war against the Illuminati, who sent him to Sakaar. During the subsequent conflict with Earth's heroes, Hiroim is defeated by Doctor Strange and loses his left arm.

Following the revelation that Miek had allowed the destruction of Sakaar, the remaining Warbound surrender to S.H.I.E.L.D. custody. They escape during tremors caused by Hulk devastating Manhattan. Channeling the rock-based powers of Korg and the Thing, Hiroim heals the damage before he and the others escape.

In World War Hulk Aftersmash: Warbound, Hiroim and the Warbound confront S.H.I.E.L.D. agents while guarding Elloe Kaifi. The Leader uses Hiroim's powers to create a gamma radiation dome, with Hiroim sacrificing himself to stop him. Hiroim is temporarily resurrected in the storyline Chaos War, where he is revealed to have been in a relationship with Korg.

== Power and abilities ==
Like all the Shadow People, Hiroim possesses enhanced physical abilities and a slowed aging process. As a Shadow Priest, he can transform into mystic rock using the Oldpower.

== In other media ==
- Hiriom appears in Planet Hulk (2010), voiced by Liam O'Brien.
- Hiroim appears in the Hulk and the Agents of S.M.A.S.H. episode "Planet Leader", voiced by Fred Tatasciore.

== See also ==
- Planet Hulk
