= Korg (character) =

Character appearing in Marvel Comics

- Korg; Art by Jim Cheung

Publication information
- Publisher: Marvel Comics
- First appearance: Journey into Mystery #83 (1962) as Korg, The Incredible Hulk (2000) #93 (May 2006)
- Created by: Greg Pak; Carlo Pagulayan

In-story information
- Alter ego: Korg
- Species: Kronan
- Team affiliations: Warbound
- Abilities: Superhuman strength, stamina, and durability

Korg is a fictional character appearing in American comic books published by Marvel Comics. Created by writer Greg Pak and artist Carlo Pagulayan, the character first appeared in The Incredible Hulk (2000) #93 (cover date May 2006) during the "Planet Hulk" storyline.

Taika Waititi portrays Korg, through the use of motion capture, in the Marvel Cinematic Universe films Thor: Ragnarok (2017), Avengers: Endgame (2019) and Thor: Love and Thunder (2022), and the short film Deadpool and Korg React (2021). Waititi also voices alternate-timeline versions of the character in the Disney+ animated series What If...? (2021).

== Publication history ==
Created by Greg Pak and Carlo Pagulayan, Korg was inspired by Thor's origin story and was later retconned in The Incredible Hulk vol. 2 #94 into one of the stone creatures that fought Thor in Journey into Mystery #83 released in 1962.

== Fictional character biography ==
Korg is part of the Kronan race seen in Journey into Mystery #83. After his defeat at the hands of Thor when the Stone Men tried to invade Earth, Korg was imprisoned by the Red King on the alien planet of Sakaar. He was forced into slavery by an obedience disk and made to fight for his life in the gladiatorial arenas. Korg was made to kill his brother Margus against his will, a fact that continues to haunt Korg.

When the Hulk was exiled to the Red King's planet, Korg became the Hulk's ally after he and five others were victorious during one of the gladiator games that rule on the planet as a form of entertainment. Korg was the first to let the group talk to each other, and after more victories in the game, Korg became a gladiator. Still fighting alongside the Hulk, Korg was part of the group that rebelled against the Red King after the Silver Surfer destroyed the disks that controlled the slaves. The Surfer had also been made a slave by such a disk, but the Hulk destroyed it during their battle.

After the detonation of Sakaar, Korg convinces Hiroim (who has lost hope and wanted to stay and die) to come with him on the space ship. Korg was with the Hulk and the others and managed to knock out Wonder Man. After the discovery that Miek had triggered the destruction of Sakaar, Korg and the other surviving Warbound surrender to S.H.I.E.L.D. custody, only to escape when the Hulk begins to destroy Manhattan. Working with Hiroim and the Thing, Korg heals the damage caused to Manhattan.

After World War Hulk, Korg becomes a supporting character and ally to various heroes, including the Hulk, Weapon H, and Man-Thing.

== Powers and abilities ==
Like all Kronans, Korg possesses a body made of a durable, silicon-based substance that grants him protection against nearly all forms of physical harm and gives him a rock-like appearance. In oxygen-rich atmospheres, Korg also possesses immense strength comparable to the Thing. His mineral body also grants him a prolonged lifespan.

When fighting as a gladiator, he mostly relied on his strength rather than actual fighting skills. He is, however, an experienced military strategist and consummate pragmatist, constantly assessing his environment so he can tell what actions are necessary for his continued survival.

== Other versions ==
=== Marvel Zombies Return ===
An alternate universe variant of Korg makes a minor appearance in Marvel Zombies Return, where he is killed by Giant-Man and the Immortals.

=== What if ===
- In What if: Planet Hulk, Korg is shown devastated that Miek was killed in the destruction of Sakaar, not knowing he was the one responsible. He also participates in the conquering of Earth with Caiera as queen.
- In What if: World War Hulk, Korg and the rest of Warbound are killed when Iron Man destroys New York.
- In "What if Thor had battled Hulk?", Korg and the rest of the Warbound battle the Warriors Three until Miek's treachery is revealed. After Thor reasons with Hulk, Korg and the Warbound leave Earth to rebuild Sakaar.

== In other media ==
=== Television ===
- Korg appears in The Super Hero Squad Show episode "Planet Hulk! (Six Against Infinity, Part 5)", voiced by Dave Wittenberg.
- Korg appears in the Hulk and the Agents of S.M.A.S.H. episode "Planet Leader", voiced by Jonathan Adams. This version is a Sakaaran native and one of the Leader's slaves who blames Skaar for helping the Leader conquer Sakaar. After the Agents of S.M.A.S.H. end up on Sakaar, they incite a revolution and free the slaves.
- Korg makes a non-speaking cameo appearance in the Moon Girl and Devil Dinosaur episode "Dancing With Myself" via a photograph.

=== Film ===
Korg appears in Planet Hulk, voiced by Kevin Michael Richardson.

=== Marvel Cinematic Universe ===
Korg as he appears in the 2017 film Thor: Ragnarok, played by the director Taika Waititi.

Korg appears in media set in the Marvel Cinematic Universe (MCU), voiced and motion captured by Taika Waititi. Waititi based Korg's voice and mannerisms on Polynesian/Maori New Zealanders, who are usually soft-spoken and known for using humor.

- Introduced in Thor: Ragnarok, Korg is among those forced into gladiatorial combat by Sakaar's ruler, the Grandmaster. Following his arrival and forced participation, Thor stages an escape, during which his ally Valkyrie helps Korg and the other gladiators incite a revolution against the Grandmaster. Along the way, Korg and his group hijack the Grandmaster's starship, the Statesman, help Thor's group evacuate Asgard and join Thor on his journey to find a new home for the Asgardian refugees.
- Korg returns in Avengers: Endgame. Five years after surviving Thanos' attack on the Statesman and the Blip off-screen during the events of Avengers: Infinity War, he lives with Miek, Thor, and the refugees in New Asgard, Norway. Korg and Miek later assist Thor, the Avengers, and their allies in defeating an alternate timeline variant of Thanos.
- Korg appears in the promotional short film Deadpool and Korg React.
- Alternate timeline variants of Korg make minor appearances in What If...?.
- Korg appears in Thor: Love and Thunder. After Gorr attacks New Asgard as part of his quest to kill all gods, Korg joins Thor and their allies in traveling to Omnipotent City to warn Thor's fellow gods. However, they get into a fight with Zeus, who reduces Korg to a head. Once Thor defeats Gorr, Korg acquires a new body and enters a relationship with fellow Kronan Dwayne (voiced by Dave Cory).

=== Video games ===
- Korg appears as a support character in Marvel Puzzle Quest.
- Korg appears as a playable character in Marvel: Contest of Champions.
- Korg appears as a playable character in Marvel Avengers Academy, voiced by Kevin Urban.
- Korg appears in Marvel Snap.

== See also ==
- "Planet Hulk"
- World War Hulk
