= Elloe Kaifi =

Marvel Comics character associated with the Hulk

- Elloe Kaifi center front row. Art by Jim Cheung.

Publication information
- Publisher: Marvel Comics
- First appearance: Incredible Hulk vol. 2 #92 (April 2006)
- Created by: Greg Pak; Carlo Pagulayan

In-story information
- Alter ego: Elloe Kaifi
- Species: Sakaar "Imperial"
- Team affiliations: Warbound

Elloe Kaifi is a fictional character appearing in American comic books published by Marvel Comics, primarily in association with the Hulk. She was introduced in 2006 as part of the Planet Hulk storyline, and was created by Greg Pak and Carlo Pagulayan.

== Fictional character biography ==
Prior to the events of Planet Hulk, Elloe Kaifi was the daughter of Ronan Kaifi, a member of a high-ranking family on the planet Sakaar. Enjoying a relatively carefree life for most of her early years, Elloe's life changed when her father spoke out against the Red King, resulting in his titles being stripped from him and he, his daughter and her bodyguard Lavin Skee being sent to the gladiator training school, the Maw. When her father protested at his treatment, he was killed by the guards shortly before the training battle began, of which Elloe and Lavin were two of the seven survivors. Initially lacking combat skills, Elloe received training from Skee before she left the group to try to aid rebels in an attack on the emperor.

After she and her fellow rebels are captured and brought before her former comrades in the arena, the gladiators are ordered to kill Elloe and the others to earn their freedom. Hiroim reveals that Lavin Skee had been killed in battle earlier, and that the others had formed a Warbound Pact. Since Skee had served Elloe, the Warbound cannot kill her without violating their oath. Although their obedience discs are activated, the Warbound are freed when the Surfer destroyed the discs, allowing them to escape and begin a rebellion against the Red King.

Although physically the weakest member of the Warbound, Elloe remains one of the members most dedicated to killing the Red King. However, she retained her old family loyalties; after the Red King is killed in a fight with the Hulk and her mother is discovered to be one of the King's remaining supporters, Elloe battles fellow Warbound Miek before Hulk tells both of them to cease.

=== Traveling to Earth ===
Following the destruction of Sakaar, Elloe travels to Earth with the remaining members of the Warbound to seek revenge on the Illuminati, who had exiled Hulk. During the fight with the Avengers, Elloe takes down Spider-Man. Later, she is shown working alongside Hiroim to capture Doctor Strange, where she defeats Ronin and Echo.

In World War Hulk's "Aftersmash" one-shot followup, Elloe is impaled on a spear to end hostilities between Sakaarians and Hivelings, who had been killing each other over Miek's complicity in the destruction of Sakaar. Though Elloe was not involved in Miek's betrayal, she was secretly glad that Crown City was destroyed, because it gave her an excuse to give in to her anger and hatred.

Elloe is shown alive, but gravely injured with the remaining Warbound when they are transported to Gammaworld, a massive energy dome placed over the southwestern United States by the Leader. Elloe's injuries are healed by exposure to gamma radiation as well as Kate Waynesboro administering medical nanites.

During Civil War II, Elloe Kaifi is with the Warbound when they learn that Hawkeye has killed Bruce Banner as part of a contingency plan.

== Other versions ==
=== Marvel Zombies Return ===
An alternate universe version of Elloe Kaifi appears in Marvel Zombies Return #4.

=== What If? ===
Elloe Kaifi is featured in several issues of What If:

- In the What If? issue revolving around Planet Hulk called What if Caiera the Oldstrong had survived the destruction of Sakaar instead of the Hulk?, Elloe assists Caiera in conquering Earth.
- Miek was also featured in a What If? issue revolving around "World War Hulk". In the first story, he is killed by Iron Man. In the second story, she and the Warbound leave Earth after Miek's treachery is exposed.

== Powers and abilities ==
Because of her training for the Olympia Imperia, Elloe possesses the physical conditioning, stamina, dexterity and agility of a top athlete. She is also a skilled hand-to-hand combatant due to her training.

== In other media ==
- Elloe Kaifi appears in the Hulk and the Agents of S.M.A.S.H. episode "Planet Leader", voiced by Laura Harris.
- Elloe Kaifi appears in Planet Hulk (2010), voiced by Advah Soudack.
