= List of actors who have played Hulk =

The following is a list of actors who have played the Hulk and Bruce Banner in various media; the two are usually performed by separate actors unless otherwise noted. The list also includes portrayals of Hulk's alters and separate characters who have taken the Hulk moniker.

== Radio and audio dramas ==
Name	Title	Date	Type
Blake Morris	Marvel's Wastelanders: Star-Lord	2021	Scripted podcast
Danny Burstein	Marvel's Wastelanders: Star-Lord	2022	Scripted podcast

== Television and DTV films ==
Name	Title	Date	Type
Bill Bixby (Banner) and Lou Ferrigno (Hulk)	The Incredible Hulk	1977	Pilot movie
Bill Bixby (Banner) and Lou Ferrigno (Hulk)	The Return of the Incredible Hulk	1977	Pilot movie
Bill Bixby (Banner) and Lou Ferrigno (Hulk)	The Bride of the Incredible Hulk	1978	Pilot movie
Bill Bixby (Banner) and Lou Ferrigno (Hulk)	The Incredible Hulk Returns	1988	Television film
Bill Bixby (Banner) and Lou Ferrigno (Hulk)	The Trial of the Incredible Hulk	1989	Television film
Bill Bixby (Banner) and Lou Ferrigno (Hulk)	The Death of the Incredible Hulk	1990	Television film
Michael Massee (Banner) and Fred Tatasciore (Hulk)	Ultimate Avengers: The Movie	2006	Animated direct-to-video film
Michael Massee (Banner) and Fred Tatasciore (Hulk)	Ultimate Avengers 2: Rise of the Panther	2006	Animated direct-to-video film
Ken Kramer (Banner) and Fred Tatasciore (Hulk)	Next Avengers: Heroes of Tomorrow	2008	Animated direct-to-video film
Bryce Johnson (Banner) and Fred Tatasciore (Hulk)	Hulk Vs.	2009	Animated direct-to-video film
Rick D. Wasserman	Planet Hulk	2010	Animated direct-to-video film
Fred Tatasciore (Banner and Hulk)	Iron Man and Hulk: Heroes United	2013	Animated direct-to-video film
Fred Tatasciore (Banner and Hulk)	Iron Man and Captain America: Heroes United	2014	Animated direct-to-video film
Fred Tatasciore (Banner and Hulk)	Avengers Confidential: Black Widow & Punisher	2014	Anime film, English dub
Yuichi Karasuma	Avengers Confidential: Black Widow & Punisher	2014	Anime film
Fred Tatasciore	Marvel Super Hero Adventures: Frost Fight!	2015	Animated direct-to-video film
Jesse Burch (Banner) and Fred Tatasciore (Hulk)	Hulk: Where Monsters Dwell	2016	Animated television film

== Television series ==
Name	Title	Date	Type
Max Ferguson (Banner and Hulk)	The Marvel Super Heroes	1966	Animated series
Bill Bixby (Banner) and Lou Ferrigno (Hulk)	The Incredible Hulk	1977–1982	Live-action series, broadcast on CBS
Ric Drasin (half-transformed Hulk)	The Incredible Hulk	1980	Episodes 56 and 57 and uncredited
Ted Cassidy (Hulk)	The Incredible Hulk	1977-1979	voice collaboration (uncredited)
Marcel Buchanan (Hulk)	The Incredible Hulk	1979	Episodes 36 and 37 and voice collaboration (uncredited)
Charles Napier (Hulk)	The Incredible Hulk	1979-1982	voice collaboration (uncredited)
Peter Cullen (Banner and Hulk)	Spider-Man and His Amazing Friends – "Spidey Goes Hollywood"	1981	Animated series
Michael Bell (Banner); Bob Holt (Hulk)	The Incredible Hulk	1982–1983	Animated series
Ron Perlman (Banner and Hulk)	Fantastic Four – "Nightmare in Green" and "Hopelessly Impossible"	1995–1996	Animated series
Ron Perlman (Banner and Hulk)	Iron Man – "Hulk Buster"	1996	Animated series
Neal McDonough (Banner) and Lou Ferrigno (Hulk)	The Incredible Hulk	1996–1997	Animated series
Michael Donovan (Grey Hulk)	The Incredible Hulk	1997	5 episodes
Lisa Zane (Jennifer Walters and She-Hulk)	The Incredible Hulk	1996	Episodes: "Doomed" and "Fantastic Fortitude"
Cree Summer (Jennifer Walters and She-Hulk)	The Incredible Hulk	1997	8 episodes
Kevin Michael Richardson (Dark Hulk)	The Incredible Hulk	1997	Episode: "Mind Over Anti-Matter"
Andrew Kavadas (Banner) and Mark Gibbon (Hulk)	Fantastic Four: World's Greatest Heroes – "Hard Knocks"	2006	Animated series
Gabriel Mann (Banner) and Fred Tatasciore (Hulk)	Wolverine and the X-Men – "Wolverine vs. the Hulk"	2009	Animated series
Gabriel Mann (Banner) and Fred Tatasciore (Hulk)	The Avengers: Earth's Mightiest Heroes	2010–2012	Animated series
Mark Gibbon (Hulk)	Iron Man: Armored Adventures	2009–2012	Animated series
Travis Willingham (Hulk)	The Super Hero Squad Show	2009–2011	Animated series
Fred Tatasciore (Hulk and Joe Fixit)	Ultimate Spider-Man	2012–2016	Animated series
Fred Tatasciore (Banner and Hulk)	Avengers Assemble	2012–2014	Animated series
Fred Tatasciore (Hulk)	Hulk and the Agents of S.M.A.S.H.	2013–2015	Animated series
Seth Green (Rick Jones / A-Bomb)	Hulk and the Agents of S.M.A.S.H.	2013–2015	Animated series
Eliza Dushku (Jennifer Walters/She-Hulk)	Hulk and the Agents of S.M.A.S.H.	2013–2015	Animated series
Clancy Brown (Thunderbolt Ross/Red Hulk)	Hulk and the Agents of S.M.A.S.H.	2013–2015	Animated series
Benjamin Diskin (Skaar)	Hulk and the Agents of S.M.A.S.H.	2013–2015	Animated series
Fred Tatasciore (Hulk)	Phineas and Ferb – "Phineas and Ferb: Mission Marvel"	2013	Animated series
Kenichirou Matsuda	Marvel Disk Wars: The Avengers	2014	Anime television film, Japanese
Kenichirou Matsuda	Marvel Future Avengers	2018	Anime television film, Japanese
Kyle Hebert	Marvel Disk Wars: The Avengers	2014	Anime television film, English dub
Jesse Burch (Banner) and Fred Tatasciore (Hulk)	Avengers Assemble	2016	Animated series
Jesse Burch (Banner) and Fred Tatasciore (Hulk)	Guardians of the Galaxy – "Stayin' Alive"	2017	Animated series
Kevin Shinick (Banner) and Fred Tatasciore (Hulk)	Spider-Man – "Halloween Moon"	2017	Animated series
Kevin Shinick (Banner) and Fred Tatasciore (Hulk)	Avengers Assemble	2017–2018	Animated series
Kevin Shinick (Banner) and Fred Tatasciore (Hulk)	Guardians of the Galaxy – "With a Little Help from My Friends"	2019	Animated series
Fred Tatasciore	Marvel Future Avengers	2018	Anime television film, English dub
Mark Ruffalo (Banner and Hulk)	What If...?	2021–2024	Animated series
Tatiana Maslany (Jennifer Walters and She-Hulk)	She-Hulk: Attorney at Law	2022	TV series
Mark Ruffalo (Banner and Hulk)	She-Hulk: Attorney at Law	2022	TV series

== Theatrical films ==
Name	Title	Date	Type
Eric Bana (Banner and Hulk)	Hulk	2003	Actor
Ang Lee (Hulk)	Hulk	2003	Motion capture and voice
Edward Norton (Banner)	The Incredible Hulk	2008	Marvel Cinematic Universe and actor
Lou Ferrigno (Hulk)	The Incredible Hulk	2008	Voice collaboration
Jonathan Lipow (Hulk)	The Incredible Hulk	2008	Voice collaboration (uncredited)
J.D. Hall (Hulk)	The Incredible Hulk	2008	Voice collaboration (uncredited)
JB Blanc (Hulk)	The Incredible Hulk	2008	Voice collaboration (uncredited)
Fred Tatasciore (Hulk)	The Incredible Hulk	2008	Voice collaboration (uncredited)
Mark Ruffalo (Banner and Hulk)	The Avengers	2012	Marvel Cinematic Universe, actor, voice and motion capture
Lou Ferrigno (Hulk)	The Avengers	2012	Voice collaboration (uncredited)
Mark Ruffalo (Banner)	Iron Man 3	2013	Marvel Cinematic Universe, actor and cameo (uncredited)
Mark Ruffalo (Banner and Hulk)	Avengers: Age of Ultron	2015	Marvel Cinematic Universe, actor and motion capture
Lou Ferrigno (Hulk)	Avengers: Age of Ultron	2015	Voice collaboration (uncredited)
Mark Ruffalo (Banner and Hulk)	Thor: Ragnarok	2017	Marvel Cinematic Universe, actor, voice and motion capture
Mark Ruffalo (Banner and Hulk)	Avengers: Infinity War	2018	Marvel Cinematic Universe, actor, voice and motion capture
Mark Ruffalo (Banner)	Captain Marvel	2019	Marvel Cinematic Universe and cameo (uncredited)
Mark Ruffalo (Banner and Hulk)	Avengers: Endgame	2019	Marvel Cinematic Universe, actor and motion capture
Mark Ruffalo (Banner)	Shang-Chi and the Legend of the Ten Rings	2021	Marvel Cinematic Universe and cameo (uncredited)
Harrison Ford (Thaddeus Ross and Red Hulk)	Captain America: Brave New World	2025	Marvel Cinematic Universe, actor and motion capture
Mark Ruffalo (Banner and Hulk)	Spider-Man: Brand New Day	2026	Marvel Cinematic Universe, actor and motion capture

== Video games ==
Name	Title	Date	Type
Andrew Jackson	Marvel Super Heroes	1995	
Andrew Jackson	Marvel Super Heroes vs. Street Fighter	1997	
Andrew Jackson	Marvel vs. Capcom: Clash of Super Heroes	1997	
Andrew Jackson	Marvel vs. Capcom 2: New Age of Heroes	2000	
Eric Bana (Banner) and Graig Robertson (Hulk)	Hulk	2003	
Neal McDonough (Banner)	The Incredible Hulk: Ultimate Destruction	2005	
Richard Moll (Devil Hulk)	The Incredible Hulk: Ultimate Destruction	2005	
Michael Donovan as Grey Hulk	The Incredible Hulk: Ultimate Destruction	2005	
Robin Atkin Downes (Banner) and Peter Lurie (Hulk)	Marvel: Ultimate Alliance	2006	
Edward Norton (Banner) and Fred Tatasciore (Hulk)	The Incredible Hulk	2008	
Fred Tatasciore (Hulk)	Marvel: Ultimate Alliance 2	2009	
Fred Tatasciore (Hulk)	Marvel vs. Capcom 3: Fate of Two Worlds	2011	
Fred Tatasciore (Hulk)	Ultimate Marvel vs. Capcom 3	2011	
Fred Tatasciore (Hulk)	Avengers Initiative	2012	
Fred Tatasciore (Hulk)	Marvel Avengers: Battle for Earth	2012	
Fred Tatasciore (Hulk)	Marvel Heroes	2013	
Fred Tatasciore (Hulk)	Lego Marvel Super Heroes	2013	
Fred Tatasciore (Hulk)	Disney Infinity 2.0	2014	
Fred Tatasciore (Hulk)	Marvel vs. Capcom Infinite	2017	
Fred Tatasciore (Hulk)	Marvel Powers United VR	2018	
Fred Tatasciore (Hulk)	Marvel Ultimate Alliance 3: The Black Order	2019	
Fred Tatasciore (Hulk)	MARVEL Dimension of Heroes	2019	
Fred Tatasciore (Hulk)	Marvel Mystic Mahyem	2025	
Fred Tatasciore (Hulk)	Marvel Tokon: Fighting Souls	2026	
Travis Willingham	Marvel Super Hero Squad	2009	
Travis Willingham	Marvel Super Hero Squad: The Infinity Gauntlet	2010	
Travis Willingham	Marvel Super Hero Squad Online	2011	
Travis Willingham	Marvel Super Hero Squad: Comic Combat	2011	
JB Blanc	Pinball FX 2	2010	
Kellen Goff (Banner) and John Cena (Hulk)	Marvel Avengers Academy	2016	
Fred Tatasciore (Red Hulk)	Marvel Avengers Academy	2016	
Gary Martin	Lego Marvel Super Heroes 2	2017	
Troy Baker (Banner) and Darin De Paul (Hulk)	Marvel's Avengers	2020	
William Salyers (Banner) and Fred Tatasciore (Hulk)	Marvel's Midnight Suns	2022	
Joe Zieja (Banner) and Fred Tatasciore (Hulk)	Marvel Rivals	2024	

== Web originals and motion comics ==
Name	Title	Date	Type
Sebastian Spence (Banner) and Michael Dobson (Hulk)	Ultimate Wolverine vs. Hulk	2013	Motion comic
Fred Tatasciore	Marvel Rising: Ultimate Comics - "Inferno"	2019	Motion comic

== See also ==
- Hulk (franchise)
- Hulk
- MCU Hulk
