= Pagulayan =

Pagulayan is a Filipino surname. Notable people with the surname include:

- Alex Pagulayan (born 1978), Filipino-Canadian pool snooker player
- Carlo Pagulayan (born 1978), Filipino comic book artist
- Louie Oliver Gonzalez Pagulayan (born 1988), Filipino - Analyst
