= World War Hulk =

2007 limited series comic book by Marvel Comics

- Cover to World War Hulk #1 by David Finch
- Publisher: Marvel Comics
- Publication date: May – November 2007
- Genre: Superhero
Title(s)
Avengers: The Initiative #4–5
Ghost Rider vol. 6, #12–13
Heroes for Hire vol. 2, #11–15
Incredible Hulk vol. 2, #106–112
Incredible Hercules #113-115
The Invincible Iron Man vol. 1, #19–20
The Irredeemable Ant-Man #10
Punisher War Journal vol. 2, #12
World War Hulk #1–5
World War Hulk Prologue: World Breaker #1
World War Hulk: Front Line #1–6
World War Hulk: Gamma Corps #1–4
World War Hulk: X-Men #1–3
World War Hulk: Gamma Files
- Main character(s): Hulk; Illuminati; Avengers; Fantastic Four; Warbound; Sentry; Thunderbolt Ross

Creative team
- Writer: Greg Pak
- Penciller: John Romita Jr.
- Inker: Klaus Janson
- Colorist: Christina Strain
- World War Hulk: ISBN 978-0785125969

"World War Hulk" is a comic book crossover storyline that ran through a self-titled limited series and various titles published by Marvel Comics in 2007, featuring the Hulk.

The series consists of five main issues titled World War Hulk, with Greg Pak as writer and John Romita Jr. as penciller, and three other limited series: World War Hulk: Front Line, World War Hulk: Gamma Corps, and World War Hulk: X-Men. It also ran through several other Marvel comics series.

The plot is the culmination of a series of events that began with the Hulk being banished to the planet Sakaar by the Illuminati in the "Planet Hulk" storyline, which immediately precedes "World War Hulk" and ends with the Hulk return to Earth to seek revenge on the Illuminati.

== Publication history ==
The story, a crossover throughout various series, began in the one-shot World War Hulk Prologue: World Breaker (May 2007), written by Peter David and penciled by Sean Phillips, Al Rio, and Lee Weeks. Marvel followed this with Incredible Hulk vol. 2 #106–111 and World War Hulk: Frontline #1–6 as parallel stories following the impact of the Hulk's return on various characters. The crossover extended into regular issues of Avengers: The Initiative, Ghost Rider, Heroes for Hire, Irredeemable Ant-Man, The Punisher War Journal, and Iron Man, as well as a miniseries starring the Hulk and the X-Men and a newly created group, the Gamma Corps. The stories ran from summer through fall, beginning in issues cover-dated July 2007. Initially scheduled to end in October, Marvel announced through the October 10 Diamond Dateline retail newsletter that the final titles in the crossover would be delayed until mid to late November.

== Plot ==
After the Illuminati (Black Bolt, Tony Stark, Doctor Strange, and Reed Richards) banished Hulk from Earth, the spacecraft they used explodes, killing Hulk's pregnant wife Caiera. Blaming the Illuminati for her death, and more powerful than ever because of his time spent absorbing the radiation levels on Sakaar, Hulk returns to Earth for revenge with his allies, the Warbound: Hiroim, Korg, Elloe Kaifi, Miek, No-Name of the Brood, Arch-E-5912, and Mung.

Stopping at the Moon, the Hulk defeats Inhuman king Black Bolt. The Hulk proceeds to Manhattan, New York where he demands the presence of The Illuminati.

He travels to the home of the X-Men, where Professor X, absent from the decision to send the Hulk off-planet, admits that while he never would have agreed to permanent banishment, he would have agreed to temporary exile while they searched for a cure. The Hulk defeats several teams of X-Men and battles the Juggernaut but leaves after learning of the M-Day incident, believing that Xavier has suffered enough.

The Hulk returns to Manhattan and battles the superhuman-operative team Gamma Corps and Ghost Rider. Hulk defeats Iron Man, destroying Stark Tower in the process. Hulk and his Warbound next defeat the New Avengers, the Mighty Avengers, Doc Samson, and the Fantastic Four (including Black Panther and Storm). The Hulk attaches "obedience disks" to the defeated, imprisoned superheroes, preventing them from using their powers.

After a brief battle involving Hercules, Amadeus Cho, Namora, and Angel, the Hulk defeats Thunderbolt Ross and a U.S. Army force. The Hulk then encounters Doctor Strange, who harnesses the power of his old enemy Zom. Hulk defeats the Zom-possessed Doctor Strange, causing him to flee.

An imprisoned Tony Stark (Iron Man) communicates with S.H.I.E.L.D., revealing an emergency plan to engulf Manhattan in the Negative Zone, thereby annihilating the Hulk and all other positive matter on the island, should the heroes fail.

The Hulk and the Warbound transform Madison Square Garden into a gladiatorial arena. Meanwhile, he repels an assassination attempt from Scorpion, and a confrontation with the Initiative.

Following speeches from the Hulk's human supporters, the Hulk arranges for Doctor Strange, Iron Man, Black Bolt, and Mister Fantastic to fight a tentacled alien and later battle each other to the death, as a cheering audience watches. The Hulk declares his intention was for "justice and not murder", and nobody had to or would die. He plans to destroy New York City and leave the Avengers to their shame.

The Sentry arrives and attacks the Hulk. Sentry and the Hulk battle, leveling the city, until they revert into Robert Reynolds and Bruce Banner with Reynolds passing out. Angered that the Hulk disappeared, Warbound member Miek attacks Banner. Rick Jones pushes Banner aside and is injured, causing Banner to return to Hulk form. As the Hulk attacks the Warbound, Miek reveals the explosion that started this war was not caused by the Illuminati, but by Red King loyalists. Miek chose not to prevent it, hoping the incident would encourage the Hulk to keep destroying. Overwhelming rage causes the Hulk to unwillingly radiate energy that threatens Earth. Stark activates a series of weaponized satellites that open fire on the Hulk, leaving him unconscious in his Bruce Banner form.

S.H.I.E.L.D. later imprisons Banner in a facility three miles underground, with the other Warbound members having been taken into U.S. military custody.

Namor alone was spared from the Hulk's wrath, as Hulk discovered early on that Namor was the sole Illuminati member who voiced his opposition to banishing the Hulk from the outset and wisely predicted Hulk's eventual return and quest for vengeance.

== Aftermath ==
With the conclusion of the "World War Hulk" storyline, the series The Incredible Hulk was replaced with The Incredible Hercules, which officially replaced the title of the previous series with issue #113, even though the story arc started one issue earlier in The Incredible Hulk #112. The series continued the story of Hercules and Amadeus Cho.

A continuation of both "Planet Hulk" and "World War Hulk" began in May 2009. A special stand-alone prologue and Skaar: Son of Hulk #11 saw the beginning of "Planet Skaar", an arc intended to bring Skaar directly into the middle of the Marvel Universe. Following the return of the Silver Savage (the Silver Surfer), events begin to spiral, forcing Skaar to not only abandon Sakaar but also head toward Earth. As was revealed by series writer Greg Pak, Mister Fantastic, Reed Richards, is not amused with the arrival of another Hulk-like being, and the meeting between father and son will not be very pleasant for the Hulk.

In the 2010 "World War Hulks" storyline, it is revealed that the satellites used to revert Hulk to Banner at the end of "World War Hulk" siphoned off the gamma radiation from his body, to collect it for the cathexis ray later used to create the Red Hulk.

== Characters ==
- Doc Samson
- Excalibur
  - Captain Britain (Brian Braddock)
  - Dazzler
  - Juggernaut
- Black Panther
- Fantastic Four
  - Human Torch
  - Invisible Woman
  - Storm
  - Thing
- Gamma Corps
- Heroes for Hire
  - Black Cat
  - Colleen Wing
  - Humbug
  - Misty Knight
  - Shang-Chi
  - Tarantula
- Ghost Rider (Johnny Blaze)
- Illuminati
  - Black Bolt (Skrull imposter)
  - Doctor Strange
  - Iron Man
  - Mister Fantastic
  - Professor X
- Initiative
  - Cloud 9
  - Gauntlet
  - Hardball
  - Justice
  - Komodo
  - Rage
  - Slapstick
  - Thor Girl (Skrull Imposter)
  - Triathlon
  - Ultra-Girl
- Shadow Initiative
  - Trauma
  - Mutant Zero
  - Bengal
  - Constrictor
  - Red Team (see Scarlet Spider)
- The Mighty Avengers
  - Ares
  - Ms. Marvel (Carol Danvers)
  - Wonder Man
- New Avengers
  - Echo
  - Iron Fist
  - Luke Cage
  - Ronin (Clint Barton)
  - Spider-Man
  - Spider-Woman (Veranke)
- The New X-Men
  - Dust
  - Elixir
  - Hellion
  - Mercury
  - Rockslide
  - Surge
  - X-23
  - Prodigy (David Alleyne)
- Sentry
- She-Hulk
- Stepford Cuckoos
- X-Factor Investigations
  - M
  - Multiple Man
  - Siryn
  - Strong Guy
  - Wolfsbane
- X-Men
  - Beast
  - Colossus
  - Cyclops
  - Darwin
  - Emma Frost
  - Hepzibah
  - Lockheed
  - Nightcrawler
  - Shadowcat
  - Warpath
  - Wolverine
- Warbound
  - Hulk
  - Arch-E-5912
  - No-Name of the Brood
  - Elloe Kaifi
  - Hiroim
  - Korg
  - Miek
  - Mung

== Other characters ==
- Eric O'Grady (as Slaying Mantis)
- Caiera
- Daredevil
- Ben Urich
- Sally Floyd
- Danny Granville
- Punisher
- Stuart Clarke
- Thunderbolt Ross
- President of the United States
- Medusa
- Monstro
- Namor
- Renegades
  - Angel
  - Hercules
  - Amadeus Cho
  - Namora
- Rick Jones
- S.H.I.E.L.D.
  - Gabe Jones
  - Maria Hill
  - Derek Khanata
  - Dum Dum Dugan (Skrull imposter)
  - Scorpion (Carmilla Black)
- Wong

== Sequel ==
=== World War Hulk II ===
A sequel arc titled World War Hulk II is shown in the issues of The Incredible Hulk. After returning from a restored Sakaar, Amadeus Cho's Hulk faces off against Phalkan. His Hulk form's persona changed to where it easily defeated Phalkan and used his "computer brain" to leave Phalkan with a broken arm, a broken foot, a punctured lung, and some broken ribs.

== Other versions ==
=== What If? ===
For the 2009 What If series, there was a What If? World War Hulk one-shot which examines two alternatives to the storyline:

- The first tale shows Tony Stark not hesitating to fire the laser satellite into New York City, killing the Warbound and many heroes during Hulk's fight with the Sentry. Watching from hiding, the Skrulls hear of the death of their queen Veranke (masquerading as Spider-Woman), but believe the Hulk is a prophet sent to aid them by destroying the heroes. They attack, their sleeper agents allowing them to wipe out most of the remaining super-beings and take over the world. Two months later, the Vision finds Bruce Banner in the ruins of New York, waiting to die, and convinces him to become the Hulk again and help. The Hulk aids the remaining heroes against the Skrulls, inspiring people to help. In this world, it's the Wasp who's a Skrull, and she infects Hank Pym with the bio-weapon that wipes out the remaining heroes. The Hulk survives and summons the Silver Surfer, demanding the Surfer call Galactus to destroy Earth. The Surfer does so, but leaves, disgusted at the Hulk's bloodthirsty ways. Galactus arrives and feeds upon Earth, destroying the Skrulls and the planet. He lets Hulk live, promising to take away his pain and memories. The Hulk agrees and is transformed into Galactus' new herald, the World-Breaker.

- The second story has Thor and the Warriors Three flying back from Africa on a plane when they hear of The Hulk's attack. Thor leads the others against the Hulk's forces. He and the Hulk engage in a massive battle across Manhattan, before learning of civilians needing help in destroyed subway tunnels, and work together to save them. Thor manages to get through to the Hulk, convincing him to give up his vendetta. Back at Madison Square Garden, the Warbound have discovered Miek's role in the destruction of Sakaar and have surrendered. Sentry arrives only to find the battle over. Thor negotiates a settlement for all parties with the Hulk and his forces returning to rebuild Sakaar and leave Earth in peace.

=== Marvel Zombies Return ===
In the last issue, the Earth-Z version of Hulk became infected while on the moon, the rest of the Warbound being devoured by the zombie Inhumans (with the Hulk eating Elloe Kaifi when the infection takes control of him). Instead of seeking revenge on the Avengers and Earth, he returned to Earth to satisfy his hunger, and in turn, infects the version of the Sentry that was responsible for the outbreak in the first place. This Hulk goes on to join Spider-Man's team of New Avengers when the Sentry turns against him.

=== Mini Marvels ===
In Chris Giarrusso's Mini Marvels comics, a World War Hulk three-story series had been written.

=== Pinball adaptation ===
Zen Studios developed a virtual pinball adaptation of the limited comic series, releasing it on the comic's fifth anniversary in 2012 as part of the four Avengers Chronicles tables as downloadable content for Marvel Pinball, Zen Pinball 2, Pinball FX 2 and Pinball FX 3. This table is set in the ruins of New York City and features voice acting and battles between the Hulk and the superheroes he sought to confront as revenge for his exile.

== Collected editions ==
Title	Material collected	Pages	Date	ISBN
World War Hulk	World War Hulk (2007) #1-5	224	May 2008	ISBN 978-1302920777
World War Hulk: Front Line	World War Hulk Prologue: World Breaker, World War Hulk: Frontline #1-5	196	June 2008	ISBN 978-0785126669
World War Hulk: Gamma Corps	World War Hulk: Gamma Corps #1-4	104	May 2008	ISBN 978-0785128045
World War Hulk: X-Men	World War Hulk: X-Men #1-3, Avengers: Initiative #4-5, Irredeemable Ant-Man #10, Iron Man vol. 4 #19-20 and Ghost Rider vol. 4 #12-13	240	May 2008	ISBN 978-0785128885
World War Hulk: Incredible Hercules	Incredible Hulk vol. 2 #106-111	142	June 2008	ISBN 978-0785129912
World War Hulk: Damage Control	World War Hulk: Aftersmash and World War Hulk: Aftersmash - Damage Control #1-3	112	June 2008	ISBN 978-0785123880
World War Hulk: Warbound	World War Hulk: Aftersmash - Warbound #1-5	120	July 2008	ISBN 978-0785116882
World War Hulk Omnibus	World War Hulk Prologue: World Breaker, World War Hulk #1-5, Incredible Hulk vol. 2 #106-111, Iron Man vol. 4 #19-20, Avengers: Initiative #4-5, Irredeemable Ant-Man #10, World War Hulk: X-Men #1-3, Ghost Rider vol. 4 #12-13, Heroes for Hire (2006) #11-15, Punisher War Journal vol. 2 #12, World War Hulk: Gamma Corps #1-4, World War Hulk: Frontline #1-5, World War Hulk: Aftersmash, World War Hulk: Aftersmash - Damage Control #1-3, World War Hulk: Aftersmash - Warbound #1-5 and Planet Hulk Saga	1304	October 2017	ISBN 978-1302908126

== Sales ==
World War Hulk No. 1 was at the top of the Diamond Comic Distributors' sales chart for June 2007, selling an estimated 178,302 copies. When the first issue sold out, Marvel announced a second printing would have a variant cover by John Romita Jr.
