= Skaar (character) =

Comic book superhero

- Variant cover to Skaar: Son of Hulk #1 by Carlo Pagulayan

Publication information
- Publisher: Marvel Comics
- First appearance: What If? Planet Hulk #1 (December 2007)
- Created by: Greg Pak (writer); John Romita Jr. (artist)

In-story information
- Species: Human mutate/Sakaaran Hybrid
- Place of origin: Sakaar
- Team affiliations: Dark Avengers
- Partnerships: Hulk; Hiro-Kala
- Notable aliases: Son of the Hulk; Sakaarson; World Breaker; Killer of Killers; Santos
- Abilities: Skilled swordsman and unarmed combatant; Transformation; Superhuman strength, stamina, endurance, durability, and senses; Regeneration; Old Power

Skaar is a superhero appearing in American comic books published by Marvel Comics, usually as a supporting character in stories featuring his father, the Hulk, who conceived Skaar with the extraterrestrial Caiera during the 2006–2007 "Planet Hulk" storyline. Created by writer Greg Pak and artist John Romita Jr., the earliest version of the character appeared in a cameo in an alternate history story in What If? Planet Hulk #1 (cover-dated December 2007), in which the character was drawn by Rafa Sandoval. The Earth-616 version of the character appeared in World War Hulk #5 (January 2008), by Pak and Romita.

The character has been adapted into various media outside comics. He first appeared in animated form in Hulk and the Agents of S.M.A.S.H. (2013–2015), where he is voiced by Benjamin Diskin and depicted as unrelated to the Hulk. Additionally, Wil Deusner portrayed Skaar in a cameo appearance in the Marvel Cinematic Universe television series She-Hulk: Attorney at Law (2022).

== Publication history ==
Skaar was created by writer Greg Pak and arist John Romita, Jr. The earliest incarnation of the character first appeared in What If Planet Hulk? #1 (Dec. 2007), "What if the Hulk Died and Caiera Lived?", an alternate history story by Pak and artist Leonard Kird, which imagines the sequence of events that would have transpired had the Hulk being killed by his exploding spaceship, rather than his wife Caiera, as occurred in the "Planet Hulk" storyline.

The Skaar of Earth-616 (the continuity in which most mainstream Marvel storylines takes place) first appeared canonically in World War Hulk #5 (Jan. 2008) a miniseries written by Pak, and illustrated by Romita, Jr. He subsequently starred in his own ongoing series by Pak, Skaar: Son of Hulk, which ran for 12 issues from 2008 to 2009.

Following the "Planet Skaar" story arc, which resulted in Skaar's arrival on Earth, the book's title changed with issue #13 to Son of Hulk, after which new writer Paul Jenkins focused on Hiro-Kala, Skaar's brother. The series ran until issue #17. The story of Hiro-Kala that begins in these issues continue in a miniseries that ties into the Realm of Kings event, Realm of Kings: Son of Hulk #1-4.

When Greg Pak became the writer of The Incredible Hulk with issue #601, Skaar allied himself with a de-powered Bruce Banner.

The character would then appear in the Skaar: King of the Savage Land miniseries by writer Rob Williams, and later appearing as a regular character in the Dark Avengers series, beginning with Dark Avengers #175.

== Fictional character biography ==
Skaar is the son of the Hulk/Bruce Banner and Caiera, an extraterrestrial native of the planet Sakaar. He was posthumously born via the Old Power after Sakaar was destroyed and Caiera killed, emerging from a cocoon on the planet's remains and rapidly aging into an adult. To survive, Skaar learned the need to kill as part of his upbringing by the savage creatures of his home planet. He demonstrates himself to be a fierce and capable general, becoming the enemy of Axeman Bone and gaining the ability to harness the Old Power to manipulate the earth.

Skaar was able to communicate with the spirit of his supposedly dead mother, Caiera. He fights a war against Axeman Bone, but this only delays his people's escape from the near-destruction of the planet by Galactus. Because the planet possesses enough energy to satiate Galactus' hunger for 100,000 years, Caiera takes the Old Power from Skaar as she tries to reason with him. Skaar admits to Caiera that he wanted to clear the evil from the planet. However, the Silver Surfer restores Skaar's Old Power and shows him a vision of the death and destruction of Sakaar, leading Skaar to destroy the evacuation ships. He tells the Surfer that if he does not spare his planet, he will use the Old Power to increase Galactus' hunger and endanger more planets, including those already saved by the Surfer. After the Surfer informs the people of Sakaar that their safety would lead to the death of countless planets, he departs. Caiera denounces Skaar for his decision and absorbs his Old Power. She then exiles him from Sakaar and waits for Galactus to consume her.

Skaar arrives on Earth with the sole desire to kill his father, the Hulk. After conflicts with the United States military, the Fantastic Four and the Warbound, he confronts the Hulk. Unbeknownst to Skaar, the Hulk has changed since his time on Sakaar. After the Hulk engages Skaar, he effortlessly beats him but their fight creates a fissure that endangers a nuclear power plant. Skaar ceases his attack when he realizes that this Hulk is not the "War Hulk" that conceived him, the one he desires to kill. He prevents the fissure from endangering the power plant and declares Earth to be his new home.

Skaar later encounters Bruce Banner, who had been depowered by the Red Hulk. Skaar reiterates his desire to kill the Hulk, but he cannot accomplish this by killing him in Banner's form as they had separated into two distinct personas. Bruce offers to teach Skaar how to kill the Hulk should he ever return, but this is a ruse to allow Banner to monitor his "son", and impart fatherly wisdom in the hope of turning the savage warrior into a hero. Skaar demonstrates his ability to use both cunning and physical strength by hurling the villain Juggernaut into outer space. Subsequent lessons by Banner include encounters with Wolverine, Wolverine's son Daken, Victoria Hand, Moonstone, Marlo Chandler, Tyrannus, the Mole Man, and his army of Moloids.

After defeating the Moloids, Skaar is proclaimed a hero and a parade is held in his honor. Banner confronts the Red Hulk but grows angry. He then teleports to the country of Latveria, supposedly to transform in private but a battle breaks out between the Hulk and Latverian leader Doctor Doom. Skaar soon intervenes with the aid of his father's teleportation technology as he wants to prevent Doom from robbing him of the ability to kill the Hulk. Doom overpowers Skaar with magic, reverting him to his human form and revealing that this Hulk is a robot. Banner then arrives to rescue his son, seeing him in his human form for the first time. Skaar rejects Banner's affection, believing that Banner cares only for his deceased wife. Skaar concludes that his discovery of the teleporter and trip to Latveria are part of another of Banner's "lessons", and reiterates his desire to someday kill him in his Hulk form.

During the "Fall of the Hulks", "World War Hulks", and "Dark Son" storylines, Skaar comes to the aid of the Avengers by battling the Red She-Hulk in a story that involves the villainous group Intelligencia capturing Banner and turning people in Washington, D.C., into Hulks, including the genius Amadeus Cho. Later in the story, Banner re-emerges as the Green Scar, prompting Skaar, who has finally been granted the confrontation he longs for, to attack him. As they fight, the Hulk rescues many bystanders endangered by the battle. Skaar reacts to his father's compassion by ceasing his own assault and reverting to human form, but the Hulk continues fighting. His actions quickly remind him of Banner's abusive father Brian, reverting him back to his human form. Banner embraces his son, who is finally willing to accept his love. Skaar then sets out on a journey with his father, sister, first cousin once removed Jennifer Walters, Rick Jones, and Betty Ross. Soon after, he senses his brother, Hiro-Kala, approaching Earth.

During the "Chaos War" storyline, Skaar helps his father and his friends battle the forces of Amatsu-Mikaboshi. When it is discovered that Brian Banner has returned from the dead and become a Guilt Hulk/Devil Hulk hybrid, Skaar helps his father fight his grandfather.

Skaar accompanies the Hulk and the Warbound to the Savage Land when they are contacted by Ka-Zar regarding the death of some Sakaarans who were living there. They discover that Miek is involved in a plot to use Sakaaran bodies to store his hatchlings. When Skaar refuses to allow the Hulk to harm the hatchlings, Miek attempts to drug Skaar. Following Miek's apparent death, Skaar remains in the Savage Land to keep an eye on the remaining Sakaarans.

Skaar is recruited by Norman Osborn to join the second incarnation of the Dark Avengers. His first fight with the team goes against him when the New Avengers discover them. After the Dark Avengers reveal that they have captured Captain America and are planning to capture the other Avengers to put on trial, Skaar turns on his teammates. It is revealed at that point that Skaar is actually a double agent. He then frees Captain America while the New Avengers defeat the remaining Dark Avengers.

Skaar later travels back to the Savage Land as it reminds him of his home planet. The Hulk in his Doc Green form tracks Skaar there to depower him as part of his plan to depower every gamma mutate on Earth. After a brief fight, Skaar is finally depowered. Doc Green teleports Skaar to Paris along with a backpack full of money so he can start a new and better life under the alias "Santos".

The Abomination's company Green Spring later repowers Skaar. While working for Green Spring, Skaar is dispatched to retrieve the escaped gamma mutate Stockpile. This puts Skaar into conflict with Gamma Flight, which comes to Stockpile's defense, and the U.S. Hulkbuster Force, which was formed to stop the threat of gamma mutates. Skaar easily defeats the U.S. Hulkbuster Force, but spares its members' lives. He is subsequently tracked down by She-Hulk, a meeting which ends with him resolving to track down and save potential victims of the "Bureau of Alien Neutralization".

== Powers and abilities ==
Skaar possesses superhuman abilities derived from his parents, the Hulk/Bruce Banner and Caiera, an alien native of the planet Sakaar. Like his father, he possesses a dual form: That of an ordinary male with normal strength, and that of a towering green humanoid. He can revert to human form when calm or otherwise incapacitated. The powers he inherited from his father are derived from Banner's exposure to gamma radiation.

In his Hulk-like form, Skaar possesses immense superhuman strength, stamina, and resistance to injury, His strength increases whenever enraged, and has been shown to be able to break off pieces of the armor worn by Juggernaut, who is otherwise unstoppable once he begins to charge forward. His resistance to injury is such that being engulfed in flames causes no damage to him, and he can easily shrug off an explosion from a rocket-propelled grenade. Iron Fist, however, is able to stun him with a powerful chi-punch.

Using the Old Power, Skaar can manipulate tectonic energy and the earth itself. He must be in contact with the ground to use this ability.

Skaar also has other powers, including the ability to rapidly heal after sustaining injuries, the ability to sense the life forces of other beings anywhere on the planet on which he is located, and the ability to transform into a Shadow form in which he can still access some of the Old Power, though he cannot use his gamma-induced powers in this form.

Skaar carries a sword that he uses in combat.

== In other media ==
=== Television ===
- Skaar appears in Hulk and the Agents of S.M.A.S.H., voiced by Benjamin Diskin. This version is the amnesiac, adopted son of unknown Sakaaran parents whom the Leader brainwashed into becoming his enforcer after conquering Sakaar. Throughout the first season, the Leader tasks Skaar with spying on the Hulk. However, Skaar eventually breaks free of the Leader's control and liberates Sakaar with the Agents of S.M.A.S.H.'s help.
- Skaar appears in the Ultimate Spider-Man episode "Contest of Champions", voiced again by Benjamin Diskin.
- Skaar makes a cameo appearance in the She-Hulk: Attorney at Law episode "Whose Show Is This?", portrayed by Wil Deusner. Head writer Jessica Gao was unaware if Marvel Studios planned to have Deusner remain in the role for future appearances.

=== Video games ===
- Skaar appears as a playable character in Lego Marvel's Avengers.
- Skaar appears in Marvel Avengers Academy, voiced by Allan Lau.
- Skaar appears as a playable character in Lego Marvel Super Heroes 2, voiced by David Menkin.
- Skaar appears in Marvel Snap.

== Collected editions ==
The series the character has appeared in have been collected into individual volumes:

Title	Material collected	Year	ISBN
Skaar: Son of Hulk	Skaar: Son of Hulk #1-6, War of Kings: Savage World of Sakaar #1 and material from Hulk Family: Green Genes #1	April 2009	978-0785136675
Skaar: Son of Hulk - Planet Skaar	Skaar: Son of Hulk #7-12, Planet Skaar: Prologue	September 2009	0-7851-3986-9
Son of Hulk: Dark Son Rising	Skaar: Son of Hulk #13-17	June 2010	978-0785140559
Skaar: Son of Hulk - The Complete Collection	Skaar: Son of Hulk #1-12, War of Kings: Savage World of Sakaar #1 Skaar: Son Of Hulk Presents The Savage World Of Sakaar #1, Planet Skaar: Prologue, War Of Kings: Savage World of Sakaar and material from Hulk Family: Green Genes #1	July 2018	978-1302912475
Incredible Hulk Vol. 1: Son of Banner	Incredible Hulk #601-605	June 2010	0-7851-4413-7
Skaar: King of the Savage Land	Skaar: King of the Savage Land #1-5	December 2011	0-7851-5694-1
