= Planet Hulk =

Marvel Comics storyline

- Publisher: Marvel Comics
- Publication date: April 2006 – June 2007
- Genre: Superhero, planetary romance
- Title(s): Incredible Hulk #92–105; Giant-Size Hulk #1 (15 issues)
- Main character(s): Hulk; Warbound; The Illuminati

Creative team
- Writer: Greg Pak
- Penciller(s): Carlo Pagulayan and Aaron Lopresti
- Inker: Jeffrey Huet
- Letterer(s): Randy Gentile; Joe Caramagna
- Colorist: Chris Sotomayor
- Editor(s): Nathan Cosby; Mark Paniccia
- Prelude to Planet Hulk: ISBN 0-7851-1953-1
- Planet Hulk: ISBN 0-7851-2245-1

"Planet Hulk" is a Marvel Comics storyline that ran primarily through issues of The Incredible Hulk starting in 2006. Written by Greg Pak, it dealt with the Marvel heroes' decision to send the Hulk away, his acclimation to and conquest of the planet where he landed, Sakaar, and his efforts to return to Earth to take his revenge.

There was also a special Planet Hulk: Gladiator Guidebook publication by Anthony Flamini and the storyline's main writer Greg Pak, similar to the Official Handbook of the Marvel Universe detailing the characters, races and cultures within the storyline.

Elements from the storyline have been adapted into other media, including an animated film of the same name, as well as the live action film Thor: Ragnarok.

== Publication history ==
The storyline's main writer Greg Pak describes the origin of the ideas: "The inspiration for sending Hulk to an alien planet where he'd battle monsters as a gladiator came from Marvel Editor-in-Chief Joe Quesada. I loved the idea from the minute I heard it, so I was blown away when they told me I had the gig and even more blown away when they basically cut me loose to create the whole world". He also drew from real-world history: "I got inspiration for the story by reading about the real lives of gladiators in ancient Rome and from the stories of figures like Genghis Khan and more contemporary warlords, dictators, and political leaders. Sun Tzu's Art of War and Joseph Campbell's Power of Myth played a big role in helping me think through other aspects of the story".

The story's roots began in the New Avengers: Illuminati one-shot and Incredible Hulk #88–91. The main storyline was told in Incredible Hulk #92–105, and Giant-Size Hulk vol 2 #1.

It led directly to the World War Hulk crossover, and inspired the Son of Hulk series.

The story was re-examined in What If?: Planet Hulk.

In October 2017, a sequel, titled Return to the Planet Hulk, starring Amadeus Cho as the Hulk, was released as a part of Marvel's Marvel Legacy initiative.

== Plot ==
=== Buildup ===
When a Gamma bomb causes the Hulk to lose control and attack Las Vegas, the Illuminati decide the Hulk is too dangerous to remain on Earth. With the help of the Hulk's friend and psychiatrist Doc Samson, they trick him into entering orbit to destroy a rogue satellite, and then use a shuttle to jettison him from the Solar System. They intended for him to land on a peaceful planet, but the shuttle passes through a wormhole on its way.

=== Main storyline ===
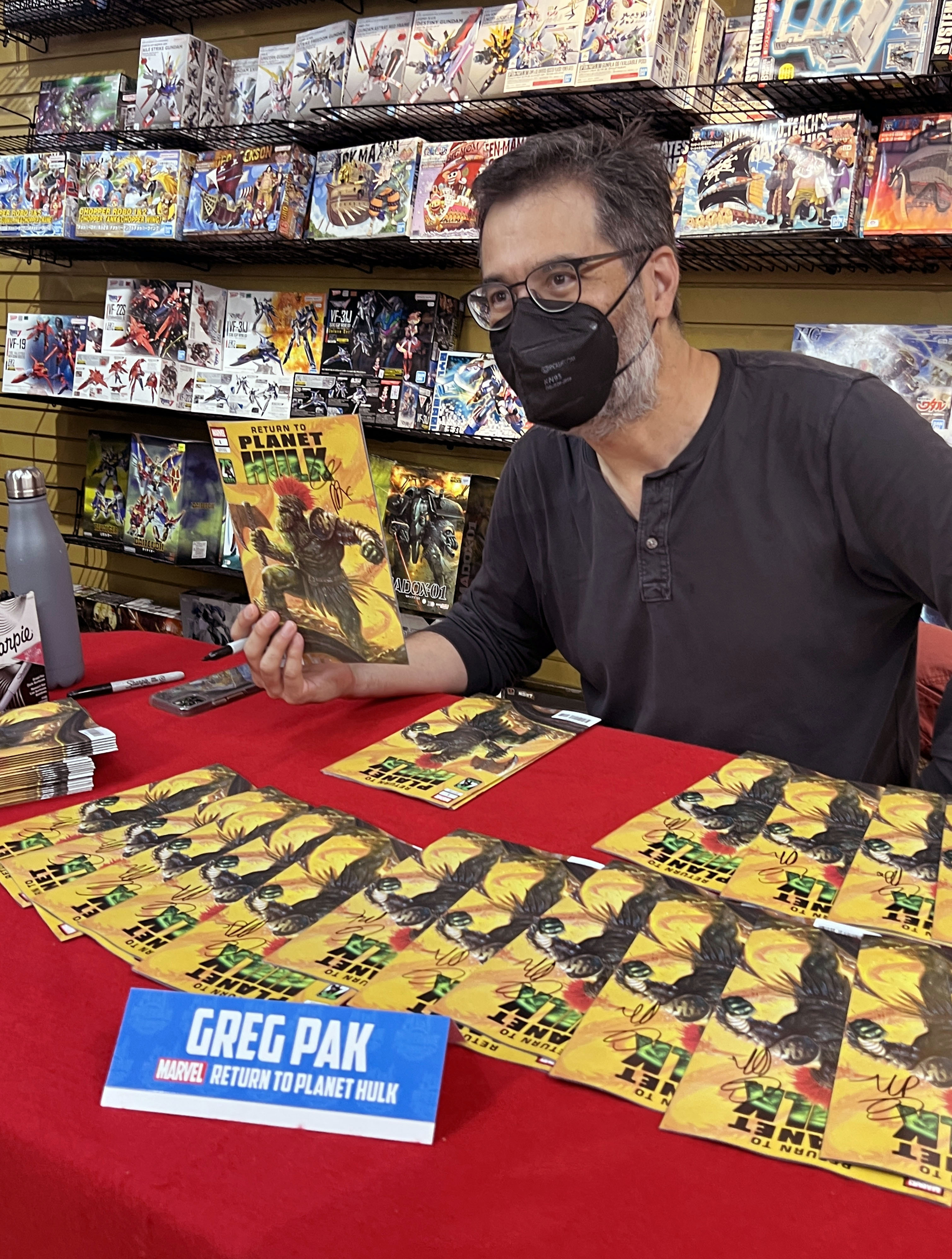
Writer Greg Pak at an October 2025 signing for Return to Planet Hulk #1 at Midtown Comics in Manhattan

As Hulk listens to a recording from the Illuminati explaining their actions, his shuttle crashes on the planet Sakaar. Weakened from the crash, Hulk is fixed with an obedience disk and taken into slavery. He is forced to fight gladiator battles for the planet's emperor, the Red King. Hulk forms a "Warbound" pact with his fellow gladiators Miek, No-Name Brood, Elloe Kaifi, Lavin Skee, Hiroim and Korg.

Hulk becomes a popular hero for his actions in the arena, and a group of insurgents try to recruit the Hulk to their cause. The Hulk declines, but Elloe chooses to go with the rebels.

During their next gladiator fight, Lavin Skee is killed. As the others come closer to winning their freedom, the Red King's lieutenant, Caiera, arranges for them to fight the Silver Surfer, who is also controlled by an obedience disk. During the battle, the Hulk breaks the Silver Surfer's disk, freeing him. After the Hulk and Warbound refuse to kill a captured Elloe alongside two other rebels, the Silver Surfer then destroys all the obedience disks of everyone in the arena. As he leaves Sakaar, he offers to return Hulk to Earth. Hulk chooses to stay behind.

The Hulk and his Warbound, now re-joined by Elloe and on the run from the Red King, are hunted by Caiera. As they travel through villages, Hulk finds followers who believe he is the foretold savior, "Sakaarson". Hulk denies this title. Caiera finally confronts the Hulk, but their battle is interrupted by an invasion of "spikes" that cause monstrous mutations and death to anyone they touch. Caiera calls the Red King for assistance and learns that he ordered the spikes to be deployed there. Horrified at what her king has done, Caiera joins the Hulk.

Hulk leads a raid on the Red King's capital, culminating in a one-on-one battle between the two of them. The Red King is defeated, and Hulk is named the new king. He takes Caiera for his wife, and the two broker peace among the various conflicts which had festered under the Red King. Caiera becomes pregnant with Hulk's child.

Meanwhile, the shuttle that brought the Hulk to Sakaar is being turned into a monument. As part of its self-destruct sequence, the antimatter warp core engine detonates in a massive explosion. The whole city is destroyed, and Caiera dies. Enraged and blaming the Avengers who built the shuttle for the damage, the Hulk and his Warbound leave Sakaar and head for Earth.

=== Aftermath ===
In the 2007 "World War Hulk" storyline, which serves as a sequel to "Planet Hulk", Hulk arrives on Earth, where he the Warbound begin attacking Earth's superheroes, whom Hulk holds responsible for his banishment to Sakaar and the death of Caiera.

Recovering from the explosion of Hulk's shuttle, the people of Sakaar rebuild their civilization with the help of the Hulk's two surviving sons, Skaar and Hiro-Kala.

== Other versions ==
=== What If? ===
A special issue of What If? featured three alternate versions of Planet Hulk:

- The first story shows the Hulk sacrificing himself to save Caiera by throwing her into the planet's orbit. Caiera survives and upon returning to Sakaar, she is met by the Warbound who learn of the Hulk's death while Miek is killed trying to find the Hulk. Caiera absorbs all of Sakaar's energy, becoming more powerful than ever, before heading to Earth with the Warbound. Doctor Strange and the Sentry intercept the ship, but Caiera uses the captured Black Bolt to vaporize them. Caiera then attacks the Fantastic Four, killing Reed Richards and eventually Iron Man. The Avengers attempt to fight her, but Caiera easily defeats them as well. Caiera then proceeds to kill the remaining heroes, but Hiroim stops her, pointing out that the "guilty have paid" and that if she wipes out everyone on the planet, no one will be left to honor the Hulk. Caiera agrees to stop fighting, but remarks that "they'll wish they were dead". Twenty-one years later, Caiera now rules earth and has enslaved humanity, while her son, Skaar, has erected a colossal statue of her late husband.
- The second story involves the Hulk landing on the planet that the Illuminati had promised him, instead of Sakaar. The Hulk begins to coexist with the creatures and finds life on the planet to be more peaceful than on earth, whilst being involved in a personal struggle between himself and Bruce Banner. Years pass, and the Hulk's actions have caused the planet's evolution to take a turn and centuries later, intelligent, humanoid beings now inhabit the planet and most consider stories of the Hulk to be only a legend. One young boy, however, sees the Hulk, who is now smaller, more "native" to the world, and at peace.
- In "What If Bruce Banner Landed on Sakaar Instead of the Hulk", Hulk's shuttle lands on Sakaar, and thinking this is a peaceful planet, the Hulk regresses to Bruce Banner, only to be killed shortly after. A year later, Reed Richards lands on Sakaar to bring Banner back to Earth but is killed as well. Ten years later, a number of heroes have been killed on Sakaar, with Hawkeye being the most recent victim.

=== "Secret Wars" (2015) ===
The 2015 "Secret Wars" storyline included a miniseries titled "Planet Hulk" written by Sam Humphries and penciled by Marc Laming. It follows a variation of Steve Rogers and a variation of Devil Dinosaur as they fight their way through the Battleworld domain of Greenland, a region filled with an assortment of Hulks.

== In other media ==
=== Television ===
- Parts of the "Planet Hulk" storyline were incorporated in The Super Hero Squad Show episode "Planet Hulk".
- In the Hulk and the Agents of S.M.A.S.H. episodes "Monsters No More" and "Planet Leader," Hulk, She-Hulk, A-Bomb, Red Hulk, and Skaar are transported to Sakaar. Leader fills in the role of the Red King. Miek, Elloe Kaifi, Hiroim, and Korg are shown to be slaves under Leader's control thanks to the control discs, while the inhabitants of Sakaar praise Leader as their hero. The Agents of S.M.A.S.H. lead the slaves in a rebellion and expose the Leader.

=== Film ===
- The Lionsgate animated feature film "Planet Hulk", which was released in February 2010, was adapted from the comics storyline. The film differs from the comic in some plot point and characters like No-Name not appearing and Beta Ray Bill appearing instead of Silver Surfer.
- The Sakaarans appear in the Marvel Cinematic Universe film Guardians of the Galaxy.
- The 2017 film Thor: Ragnarok, which is also set in the Marvel Cinematic Universe, adapts elements of the "Planet Hulk" story. In the film, the Grandmaster is the ruler of Sakaar instead of the Red King. Additionally, the Hulk became a gladiator willingly, where in the comics he does so reluctantly (although some of the circumstances of his arrival on the planet are adapted to fit Thor's story). Both of them managed to lead a slave rebellion before returning to Asgard to stop Hela.

=== Video games ===
- The Hulk's experience on Sakaar is referenced in dialogue in Marvel: Ultimate Alliance 2 and Ultimate Marvel vs Capcom 3.
- Hulk's gladiator armor appears as a playable skin via downloadable content in Marvel vs. Capcom: Infinite.
- Hulk's gladiator armor appears as an unlockable skin in Marvel: Ultimate Alliance

=== Literature ===
- A prose novelization of Planet Hulk, also written by Greg Pak, has been released. A full-cast audiobook of Pak's novelisation was released by GraphicAudio in 2017.

== Collected editions ==
The series has been collected into a number of individual volumes:

- Incredible Hulk: Prelude to Planet Hulk (collects Incredible Hulk vol. 2 #88–91 and Hulk Handbook 2004, softcover, Marvel Comics, March 2006, ISBN 0-7851-1953-1)
- Hulk: Planet Hulk (collects Incredible Hulk vol. 2 #92–105, Giant-Size Hulk vol. 2 #1, and "Mastermind Excello" from Amazing Fantasy #15, 416 pages, Marvel Comics, hardcover, June 2007, ISBN 0-7851-2245-1, softcover, April 2008, ISBN 0-7851-2012-2)
- Planet Hulk Omnibus (collects Fantastic Four vol. 1 #533–535, Incredible Hulk vol. 2 #88–105, Giant-Size Hulk vol. 2 #1, What If? Planet Hulk, Planet Hulk: Gladiator Guidebook, material from New Avengers: Illuminati, Amazing Fantasy vol. 2 #15, 656 pages, Marvel Comics, hardcover, September 2017, ISBN 978-1302907693)
