= Devil Hulk =

- The Devil Hulk in The Incredible Hulk (vol. 3) #19 (October 2000); Art by Ron Garney

Publication information
- Publisher: Marvel Comics
- First appearance: The Incredible Hulk (vol. 3) #13 (April 2000)
- Created by: Paul Jenkins; Ron Garney; Sal Buscema

In-story information
- Alter ego: Doctor Robert Bruce Banner
- Species: Human mutate
- Supporting character of: Hulk
- Notable aliases: The Devil
- Abilities: Illusion generation; Superhuman strength, speed, endurance, reflexes, and durability

The Devil Hulk, also known as the Immortal Hulk, is a fictional alternate-personality character appearing in American comic books published by Marvel Comics.

== Publication history ==
The Devil Hulk first appeared in The Incredible Hulk (vol. 2) #13 (April 2000) and was created by Paul Jenkins, Ron Garney, and Sal Buscema. After a long absence from the comics, the Devil Hulk returned as the primary Hulk personality of The Immortal Hulk, a Marvel Comics series that launched in June 2018. The series writer, Al Ewing, stated that he "wanted to give some much-needed nuance to Bruce and the Hulk's side of this story – and also reveal more about the Banner/Hulk dynamic at the core of Immortal Hulk." The Immortal Hulk is penciled by Joe Bennett and features covers by Alex Ross.

== Fictional character history ==
=== The Incredible Hulk ===
The Devil Hulk is an alternate personality of Bruce Banner, personifying all of Bruce's resentment at the way he is treated by the world, and all his negative emotions such as self-hatred. The Devil Hulk is also one of the Hulk's enemies, constantly threatening to escape the confines of Bruce's mind and destroy the world that has tormented and abused them. While the character's physical appearance varies, he is always depicted as having glowing red eyes and reptilian traits.

The Devil Hulk first appears when Bruce uses a machine created by Angela Lipscombe to travel into his own mind, which is being overtaken by the Guilt Hulk as he begins to die of ALS. In a cavern containing innumerable other personalities frozen in ice, Bruce finds the Devil Hulk unfrozen but bound by chains. After explaining the nature of his existence, the Devil Hulk says he will banish the Guilt Hulk (his inability to feel guilt giving him the advantage over the entity) if Bruce releases him from his shackles, but Bruce refuses the Devil Hulk's help and flees. He manages to keep the Devil Hulk contained and ensure the future safety of the world by making a deal with the three 'primary' Hulk personas (the Savage Hulk, the Grey Hulk, and Professor Hulk) that they will share control of the body once Banner's disease becomes too serious while leaving Banner with some degree of awareness and control. Later, Bruce's mind is thrown into disarray by the experiments of John Ryker, allowing the Devil Hulk to escape the cave from which he taunts Bruce.

The Devil Hulk's alternate form restrained by the Savage Hulk and the Grey Hulk in The Incredible Hulk (vol. 3) #30, art by Joe Bennett

As Bruce's condition worsens, the Devil Hulk enacts a plan to manifest in the real world by trapping Bruce's consciousness in an illusionary utopia. The three core Hulk personalities manage to break through the fantasy and Bruce leaves it, rejecting the Devil Hulk's offer to repair it and allow Bruce to live peacefully within it in exchange for control of Bruce's physical body. He is overpowered by the Savage and Grey Hulks in the mindscape while threatening everyone and everything Bruce holds dear, apparently being permanently contained within Bruce's mind after his disease had been treated.

During the Chaos War storyline, Bruce's father Brian Banner is released from Hell and becomes a hybrid of the Guilt Hulk and the Devil Hulk.

=== The Immortal Hulk ===
After Bruce Banner's death during Civil War II and subsequent resurrection during the events of Avengers: No Surrender, the Devil Hulk suppresses the rest of Bruce's personalities and becomes the dominant Hulk. During a conversation with Doc Samson, the Devil Hulk reveals that he embodies Bruce's desire for a protective father figure, and that Bruce's inability to "imagine love without pain" is why he had previously perceived it as being a malevolent, sadistic entity.

During the events of Absolute Carnage, the Venom symbiote takes Bruce as its host to fight Carnage. Inside of Bruce's mind, Bruce converses with Venom as the other Hulk personalities such as Joe Fixit and the Savage Hulk add their opinions about their current situation. The Devil Hulk (in his more traditional reptilian form) is against the symbiote's presence in Bruce and says it should be removed immediately, saying that they have more important matters to deal with. In the end, Bruce, Joe Fixit, and the Savage Hulk agree to collaborate with Venom. The Devil Hulk storms off, saying they are making a mistake.

When Bruce is affected by Xemnu's mental manipulations, the Devil Hulk is imprisoned inside of Bruce's mindscape, leaving the Savage Hulk in control. When the Leader finds his way into the mindscape and takes over the Green Scar personality, Devil Hulk watches as Bruce and Joe Fixit are imprisoned as well. Devil Hulk escapes from his cage and confronts the Leader, only to be killed.

== Powers and abilities ==
Like the traditional Hulk, he possesses superhuman strength and stamina. As it took both the Savage Hulk and the Grey Hulk personas to hold him down when he attempted to escape while Banner was being treated for a presumably incurable disease, the Devil Hulk appeared to be stronger than any of the previously introduced Hulks. However, since this confrontation took place on the mental plane, it reflects the force of the Devil Hulk's will compared to the more child-minded Hulks rather than providing a clear indication of their actual physical strength. During the Immortal Hulk series, it was shown that the Devil Hulk persona is even stronger than the Green Scar (World War Hulk). Thanks to his intelligence, he has the ability to detect lies from people who hurt him. His newfound level of strength was enough to throw Hercules and Thor away by a mere flex of his muscles, and he is capable of leveling a mountain with an ability called Gamma Burst. Due to gamma radiation from the Below-Place, regeneration is seen in a more gruesome detail. During an experiment where the Hulk's body is torn apart, he can remain alive and control every non-attached limb.

== In other media ==
- The Devil Hulk appears as a boss in The Incredible Hulk: Ultimate Destruction, voiced by Richard Moll. He attempts to gain control of Bruce Banner's body, claiming to be a natural stage in the gamma evolution process. With Doc Samson's help, Banner constructs a machine that allows him to enter his own mind and defeat the Devil Hulk.
- The Immortal Hulk appears as a playable character in Marvel Contest of Champions and Marvel Puzzle Quest.
