= Doc Samson =

Marvel Comics fictional character

- Doc Samson as depicted in his debut appearance in The Incredible Hulk #141 (July 1971). Art by pencils John Severin; Inks Herb Trimpe.

Publication information
- Publisher: Marvel Comics
- First appearance: The Incredible Hulk #141 (July 1971)
- Created by: Roy Thomas (writer); Herb Trimpe (artist)

In-story information
- Alter ego: Leonard Skivorski Jr.
- Species: Human mutate
- Partnerships: Dr. Bruce Banner
- Supporting character of: Hulk
- Notable aliases: Dr. Leonard "Leo" Samson; Dark Samson; Doc Sasquatch
- Abilities: (All): High intelligence; (Both Doc & Dark Samson): Superhuman strength, stamina, durability, speed, leaping, and vitality; Gamma ray empowerment; (Doc Sasquatch): Sasquatch form; Telepathic resistance; Immortality

Doc Samson (Leonard Skivorski Jr.) is a fictional character appearing in American comic books published by Marvel Comics. The character is usually depicted as a superhero and psychiatrist in the Marvel Universe, known as a supporting character in stories featuring the Hulk.

Ty Burrell portrayed Samson in the 2008 Marvel Cinematic Universe film The Incredible Hulk. Additionally, Shadoe Stevens, Cam Clarke, and J. P. Karliak have voiced Samson in animation.

== Creation ==
Thomas spoke on the creation of the character stating,

I wanted a super-powered human with green hair to fight The Incredible Hulk, and I showed Herb Trimpe copies of the "Captain Tootsie" comic strip ads that ran in 1940s comics, with a hero designed originally by Fawcett Captain Marvel co-creator C.C. Beck. I had Herb add the lightning bolt and different boots in honor of that Captain Marvel, but the basic look in Captain Tootsie, as Herb remembered and often stated.

== Publication history ==
First appearance of Doc Samson from issue #141 of The Incredible Hulk. Art by Herb Trimpe

Doc Samson debuted in The Incredible Hulk vol. 2 #141 (July 1971), created by writer Roy Thomas and artist Herb Trimpe. Since then he has also appeared as a supporting character in several different Marvel Comics titles, including She-Hulk, Uncanny X-Men, and Amazing Spider-Man. In 1996 Doc Samson starred in his first self-titled miniseries written by Dan Slott. In 2006, Samson starred in a second miniseries, written by Paul Di Filippo and penciled by Fabrizio Fiorentino.

== Fictional character biography ==
Leonard Skivorski Jr. was born in Tulsa, Oklahoma. He was raised Jewish and attended yeshiva. His father, Dr. Leonard "Leo" Skivorski, was a popular psychiatrist in his hometown who specialized in treating young women, often conducting extramarital affairs with them. Mrs. Skivorski had nicknamed her husband "Samson" after his long hair. Leonard Jr. initially expressed disinterest in becoming a psychiatrist, perhaps because he resented his father's philandering. Despite this, he became a college professor and psychiatrist.

After Bruce Banner was temporarily cured of being the Hulk by siphoning off the gamma radiation that caused his transformations, Samson, who had been working with Banner/Hulk in his job as a psychiatrist, exposed himself to some of the siphoned radiation, granting him superhuman strength and long hair similar to his biblical namesake. Shortly afterward, his flirting with Betty Ross causes a jealous Banner to re-expose himself to radiation, becoming the Hulk once more to battle Samson.

Samson is captured by the Leader. He joins forces with the Hulk against the Leader's Humanoids. He attempts a psychoanalysis of the Hulk through his dreams and diagnoses him with multiple personality disorder. Samson later quits Gamma Base and becomes Thunderbolt Ross' psychiatrist.

Vision later offers Doc Samson a position as the leader of a midwestern branch of the Avengers. Samson declines due to having accepted a position teaching at Northwestern University and lacking the necessary skills to lead the Avengers.

Samson, determined again to cure the Hulk, defeats him in battle by triggering the Banner personality to make illusions of various supervillains for the Hulk to fight. Convinced Samson is an illusion, the Hulk leaves himself open to being punched by Samson and rendered unconscious. Samson succeeds in separating Bruce Banner and the Hulk, with the latter becoming nearly mindless. Thunderbolt Ross sabotages the nutrient bath intended to reunite Banner and Hulk, causing the Grey Hulk personality to resurface.

To "cure" the Hulk's multiple personality disorder, Samson hypnotizes Banner with the Ringmaster's help and integrates the Banner, grey Hulk and green Hulk personalities. This creates a new, more stable personality referred to as Professor Hulk.

In "Civil War", Samson appears as a member of Iron Man's Pro-Registration team. As part of this group, he helps She-Hulk and Spider-Man take down a rampaging robot. The Pro-Registration team ultimately wins when Captain America surrenders.

In "Planet Hulk", Samson works with the Illuminati to exile the Hulk from Earth. In "World War Hulk", Hulk returns to Earth and battles Samson and other heroes before being subdued by Iron Man.

Following "Secret Invasion", Doc Samson is shown leading a support group meeting with those who had been replaced by Skrulls. In "Dark Reign", Samson attempts to expose the illegal activities of Norman Osborn and the Thunderbolts. Before Samson can show the evidence to the President, the Thunderbolts hijack the plane, during which Ant-Man implants a gamma emitter on Samson's neck that causes him to attack the President. Ghost then phases Samson out of the plane. Osborn believes that Samson survived the fall and places a warrant for his arrest.

In Hulk (vol. 2), Samson appears in Russia alongside Iron Man, Thunderbolt Ross, and She-Hulk, investigating the murder of the Abomination at the hands of a Hulk-like creature. After an altercation over jurisdiction with the Winter Guard, Samson and Ross return to the United States to consult an imprisoned Bruce Banner.

In The Incredible Hulk #600 (2009), Samson is brainwashed by MODOK and develops a malevolent split personality. However, Samson later confronts and eliminates this personality. When the Intelligencia develops a Cathexis Ray to transform people into gamma mutates, Samson sacrifices himself to help Bruce Banner absorb its energy.

During the "Chaos War" storyline, Doc Samson is temporarily resurrected after Death leaves the underworld, enabling its residents to escape. In The Immortal Hulk, Samson is permanently resurrected via the Green Door. He and Sasquatch are killed in battle with the Leader and return to the mortal plane by possessing each other's bodies, respectively assuming the aliases of Doc Sasquatch and Walt Samson.

== Powers and abilities ==
Doc Samson possesses superior physical attributes as a result of bombardment to concentrated gamma rays. The gamma radiation mutated Samson's physique by adding considerable muscle and bone mass to his body, thus granting him immense strength. Initially, Samson's physical strength depends upon the length of his hair, though his mutation eventually stabilized, making the length of his hair no longer a factor. His strength is equal to that of the Gray Hulk, but less powerful than the latter in a calm emotional state. However, unlike the Savage Hulk, it does not increase due to adrenaline surges while getting angry. Like other gamma mutates, Samson is also able to run at tremendous speeds. He can even leap incredible distances vertically and horizontally, though not nearly as far as the Hulk, Abomination, or She-Hulk.

Aside from more muscle/bone mass, his bodily tissues are fortified and considerably harder than to those of an ordinary human, thus granting him dynamic durability. Samson can withstand falls from great heights, extreme temperatures, high caliber bullets, and massive impact forces like being repeatedly struck by the Hulk without sustaining injury. Due to his advanced musculature, Samson's muscles produce considerably less fatigue toxins during physical activity than a normal human, and grant him unnatural stamina. He has demonstrated this to battle a mindless incarnation of the Hulk for more than six hours.

In The Immortal Hulk, it is revealed that Samson can resurrect himself after dying by passing through the Green Door, with certain limitations. While in the body of Sasquatch, he has full access to his bestial abilities.

Doc Samson is a skilled psychiatrist, theoretical technician, and inventor of various medical devices. He has often called on to counsel several superhumans, such as the members of X-Factor. His powerful mind also permits him to block out psionic attacks and manipulation. Samson is a formidable unarmed combatant, he has been able to briefly hold his own against the combined forces of Iron Man, Wonder Man, Namor, and Hercules, after they have first battled the mindless Hulk. He sometimes uses psychology as a tool to get through a more powerful opponent's guard, including an Infinity Gem-empowered Titania.

== Other versions ==
=== Mutant X ===
An alternate universe version of Doc Samson from Earth-1298 appears in Mutant X. This version is a member of the Defenders who possesses a similar appearance to the Hulk while retaining his mind. He is later killed in the conflict between the Beyonder and the Goblyn Queen.

=== Marvel Zombies ===
An alternate universe version of Doc Samson from Earth-2149 appears in Marvel Zombies: Dead Days.

=== Spider-Ham ===
Doc Clamson, an alternate universe funny animal version of Doc Samson from Earth-1611, appears in Peter Porker, The Spectacular Spider-Ham #16.

=== Ultimate Marvel ===
An alternate universe version of Doc Samson from Earth-1610 appears in Ultimate Spider-Man #156 as Norman Osborn's psychiatrist.

== In other media ==
=== Television ===
- Doc Samson appears in The Incredible Hulk (1996), voiced by Shadoe Stevens.
- Doc Samson appears in The Avengers: Earth's Mightiest Heroes, voiced by Cam Clarke. This version is a colleague of Bruce Banner who previously worked at the Cube before being mutated by exposure to gamma radiation during the events of the episode "Breakout". Afterwards, he joins S.H.I.E.L.D. and is temporarily mind-controlled into joining the Red Skull's Code Red before being freed by the Avengers.
- Doc Samson appears in The Super Hero Squad Show episode "This Man-Thing, This Monster! (Six Against Infinity, Part 3)", voiced by Dave Boat.
- Doc Samson makes a cameo appearance in the Ultimate Spider-Man episode "Beetle Mania", voiced by Steve Blum.
- Doc Samson appears in the Hulk and the Agents of S.M.A.S.H. episode "The Skaar Whisperer", voiced by J.P. Karliak. This version is a psychiatrist specializing in anger management and behavioral conditioning.

=== Film ===
Leonard Samson appears in The Incredible Hulk (2008), portrayed by Ty Burrell. This version is a Culver University psychiatrist who briefly dates Betty Ross until Bruce Banner resurfaces.

=== Video games ===
Doc Samson appears in The Incredible Hulk: Ultimate Destruction, voiced by Daniel Riordan.

=== Miscellaneous ===
Doc Samson's Jewish heritage is discussed in the nonfiction book From Krakow to Krypton.
