= Miek =

- Miek; Art by Leonard Kirk

Publication information
- Publisher: Marvel Comics
- First appearance: Incredible Hulk (vol. 3) #92 (April 2006)
- Created by: Greg Pak; Carlo Pagulayan

In-story information
- Full name: Miek
- Species: Sakaar native
- Team affiliations: Warbound
- Notable aliases: King Miek; Queen Miek; Miek the Unhived

Miek is a fictional character appearing in American comic books published by Marvel Comics. Originally depicted as a heroic insectoid alien and ally of the Hulk, Miek later metamorphoses into a colossal female form and becomes his enemy.

Miek appears in the Marvel Cinematic Universe (MCU) films Thor: Ragnarok (2017), Avengers: Endgame (2019), and Thor: Love and Thunder (2022). Originally depicted as a silent CGI character, he is portrayed by Carly Rees and voiced by Stephen Murdoch in the latter film.

== Publication history ==
Miek first appeared in The Incredible Hulk vol. 3 #92 during the "Planet Hulk" storyline, and was created by writer Greg Pak and artist Carlo Pagulayan.

== Fictional character biography ==
Miek is an insect-like alien originating from the planet Sakaar. When he was young, local Imperials killed his father and most of his hive, forcing Miek to flee underground. He was accidentally rescued, as an outcast slave, during Hulk's battle with the Red King. Miek and No-Name the Brood free the surviving members of Miek's hive. Within a short time, Miek metamorphoses into a larger armored form.

After Hulk's lover Caiera is killed in an explosion that devastates Sakaar, Miek and the Warbound accompany Hulk back to Earth, seeking vengeance against those responsible for his exile. It is later revealed that Miek knew all along that the Illuminati were not responsible for Sakaar's destruction. Red King loyalists had planted a damaged warp core on Hulk's ship, hoping to kill him. Miek did not tell Hulk that the core was unstable, leading the core to explode and devastate Sakaar. Enraged, Hulk and No-Name nearly kill Miek. After Hulk's defeat, Miek is captured by S.H.I.E.L.D.

=== Chaos War ===
Miek is imprisoned in the Negative Zone until Amatsu-Mikaboshi becomes the Chaos King and attacks all of reality, enabling Miek to escape. Due to exposure to the Chaos King's energies, Miek becomes biologically female. This allows her to lay clutches of eggs, but her hatchlings are unable to survive long after birth. Miek travels to the Savage Land and kills forty-three Sakaaran refugees residing there. When Hulk and the Warbound confront Miek, she captures Hulk and attempts to have her children gestate inside his body. Using powerful chemicals, Miek keeps Hulk drugged and under mind control. When Hulk's rage burns out the mind control, Miek attempts to drug Hulk's son Skaar to make him kill his father, only to be killed in battle with the Hulk.

== Powers and abilities ==
As a Sakaaran Native, Miek hatched from an egg in a grub-like larval stage and eventually entered a cocoon-like pupae stage after several months. Six months later, he emerged from his cocoon as an adult Native, with antennae, six limbs, and glands used to communicate with other members of his hive. Later in life, Miek entered a second pupae stage and emerged as a Native king, with an armored carapace, clawed phalanges, and overall greater body mass.

== In other media ==
=== Television ===
- Miek appears in The Super Hero Squad Show episode "Planet Hulk! (Six Against Infinity, Part 5)", voiced by Dave Wittenberg.
- Miek appears in the Hulk and the Agents of S.M.A.S.H. episode "Planet Leader", voiced by Benjamin Diskin.
- Miek appears in the Marvel Super Hero Adventures episode "It's An Alien!", voiced again by Sam Vincent. This version possesses a purple spider-like appearance and uses robotic arms.

=== Film ===
Miek appears in Planet Hulk, voiced by Sam Vincent. This version is cowardly yet good-natured and friendly and looks up to Hulk as a friend. As opposed to his comics counterpart, Miek becomes braver over the course of the film, single-handedly fighting and killing a traitor who was about to kill his friends.

=== Marvel Cinematic Universe ===
A female incarnation of Miek appears in media set in the Marvel Cinematic Universe (MCU). This version is initially a larva-like creature and friend of Korg's who uses a robotic exoskeleton equipped with blades.

- Miek first appears in Thor: Ragnarok. While being forced by the Grandmaster to fight in gladiatorial combat on the planet Sakaar, Miek and Korg meet and befriend Thor after he arrives. When Thor stages an escape, Valkyrie frees Miek, Korg, and the rest of the gladiators to start a revolution. After hijacking the Grandmaster's starship, the Statesman, the gladiators help Thor evacuate Asgard before joining him in finding a new home for the Asgardian refugees.
- In Avengers: Endgame, five years after surviving Thanos' attack on the Statesman and the Blip off-screen during the events of Avengers: Infinity War, Miek has settled on Earth in New Asgard, Norway alongside Korg, Thor, and the refugees. Miek and Korg later help Thor, the Avengers, and their allies defeat an alternate timeline variant of Thanos.
- Alternate timeline variants of Miek appear in the Disney+ animated series What If...?.
- Miek makes a minor appearance in Thor: Love and Thunder, portrayed by Carly Rees and voiced by Stephen Murdoch. As of this film, she has metamorphosed and travels in a robotic exoskeleton resembling a well-dressed woman.

=== Video games ===
- Miek appears in Marvel Contest of Champions.
- Miek appears in Marvel Avengers Academy, voiced by Kevin Urban.
- Miek appears in Marvel Snap.

== See also ==
- Planet Hulk
- World War Hulk
