= Hulk =

Marvel Comics superhero

Bruce Banner Hulk
- Cover art for the comic book issue The Immortal Hulk #20 (July 2019); Art by Dale Keown and Peter Steigerwald

Publication information
- Publisher: Marvel Comics
- First appearance: The Incredible Hulk #1 (May 1962)
- Created by: Stan Lee; Jack Kirby

In-story information
- Full name: Robert Bruce Banner
- Species: Human mutate (Note: In Marvel comics, the term "mutate" is used as a noun to designate characters that received superpowers from an external source, as opposed to Marvel's mutants.)
- Team affiliations: Avengers; Defenders; Horsemen of Apocalypse; Fantastic Four; Pantheon; Warbound; Secret Avengers
- Partnerships: She-Hulk
- Notable aliases: The Incredible Hulk, Joe Fixit, World-Breaker, Devil Hulk, Jade Giant, Jade Jaws, Doc Green, Guilt Hulk/Guilt, War
- Abilities: See list: As Bruce Banner: Genius level intellect; Proficient scientist and engineer As Hulk: Enormous superhuman strength, speed, stamina, agility, reflexes, senses, durability, endurance, and longevity; Invulnerability; Anger empowerment; Regeneration; Super jumps; Shockwave generation; Energy absorption; Gamma ray emission and manipulation; Ability to breathe underwater, breathe in space and see ghosts and other astral entities

The Hulk is a superhero appearing in American comic books published by Marvel Comics. Created by writer Stan Lee and artist Jack Kirby, the character first appeared in the debut issue of The Incredible Hulk (May 1962). In his comic book appearances, the character, who has dissociative identity disorder (DID), is primarily represented by the alter ego Hulk, an immense, green-skinned, hulking brute, possessing a limitless degree of physical strength, and the alter ego Dr. Robert Bruce Banner, a physically weak, socially withdrawn, and emotionally reserved physicist, both of whom typically resent each other. Lee stated that the Hulk's creation was inspired by a combination of Frankenstein and Dr. Jekyll and Mr. Hyde.

Following his accidental exposure to gamma rays while saving the life of Rick Jones during the detonation of an experimental bomb, Banner is physically transformed into the Hulk when subjected to emotional stress, at or against his will. This transformation often leads to destructive rampages and conflicts that complicate Banner's civilian life. The Hulk's level of strength is usually conveyed proportionate to his anger level. Commonly portrayed as a raging savage, the Hulk has been represented with other alter egos like a gangster (Joe Fixit), a merged personality (Professor Hulk), a brilliant warrior (Green Scar), Banner's inner child (Big Guy), Big Guy's self-hating father figure (Devil Hulk), a genius scientist in his own right (Doc Green), and several minor alter egos.

Despite Hulk and Banner's desire for solitude, the character has a large supporting cast. This includes Banner's love interest Betty Ross, his best friend, Rick Jones, his cousin She-Hulk, and therapist and ally Doc Samson. In addition, the Hulk alter ego has many key supporting characters, like his co-founders of the superhero team the Avengers, his queen Caiera, fellow warriors Korg and Miek, and sons Skaar and Hiro-Kala. However, his uncontrollable power has brought him into conflict with his fellow heroes and others such as General Thunderbolt Ross, Betty's father. Despite this, he tries his best to do what's right while battling villains such as the Leader, the Abomination, the Absorbing Man, and more.

One of the most iconic characters in popular culture, the character has appeared on a variety of merchandise, such as clothing and collectable items that was inspired by real-world structures (such as theme park attractions), and been referenced in several media. Banner and the Hulk have been adapted into live-action, animated, and video game incarnations. The character was first played in live-action by Bill Bixby and Lou Ferrigno in the 1978 television series The Incredible Hulk and its subsequent television films. In the 2003 film Hulk, the character was played by Eric Bana. In the Marvel Cinematic Universe (MCU), the character was first portrayed by Edward Norton in the film The Incredible Hulk (2008) and then by Mark Ruffalo in later appearances in the franchise.

== Concept and creation ==
The Hulk was created by Stan Lee and Jack Kirby. Lee cited influence from Frankenstein and Dr. Jekyll and Mr. Hyde in the Hulk's creation:

It was patently apparent that [the monstrous character the] Thing was the most popular character in [Marvel's recently created superhero team the] Fantastic Four. ... For a long time, I'd been aware of the fact that people were more likely to favor someone who was less than perfect. ... It's a safe bet that you remember Quasimodo, but how easily can you name any of the heroic, handsomer, more glamorous characters in The Hunchback of Notre Dame? And then there's Frankenstein ... I've always had a soft spot in my heart for the Frankenstein monster. No one could ever convince me that he was the bad guy. ... He never wanted to hurt anyone; he merely groped his torturous way through a second life trying to defend himself, trying to come to terms with those who sought to destroy him. ... I decided I might as well borrow from Dr. Jekyll and Mr. Hyde as well—our protagonist would constantly change from his normal identity to his superhuman alter ego and back again.

Hulk comic logo

Kirby also stated the Frankenstein inspiration stating, "I did a story called "The Hulk"– a small feature, and it was quite different from the Hulk that we know. But I felt that the Hulk had possibilities, and I took this little character from the small feature and I transformed it into the Hulk that we know today. Of course, I was experimenting with it. I thought the Hulk might be a good-looking Frankenstein. I felt there's a Frankenstein in all of us; I've seen it demonstrated. And I felt that the Hulk had the element of truth in it, and anything to me with the element of truth is valid and the reader relates to that. And if you dramatize it, the reader will enjoy it." Kirby also commented upon his influences in drawing the character, and recalled the inspiration of witnessing the hysterical strength of a mother lifting a car off her trapped child.

Lee has also compared Hulk to the golem of Jewish mythology. In The Science of Superheroes, Gresh and Weinberg see the Hulk as a reaction to the Cold War and the threat of nuclear attack, an interpretation shared by Weinstein in Up, Up and Oy Vey. This interpretation corresponds with other popularized fictional media created during this time period, which took advantage of the prevailing sense among Americans that nuclear power could produce monsters and mutants.

In the debut, Lee chose gray for the Hulk because he thought gray was a scary color and he wanted a color that did not suggest any particular ethnic group. Colorist Stan Goldberg, however, had problems with the gray coloring, resulting in different shades of gray, and even green, in the issue. After seeing the first published issue, Lee chose to change the skin color to green. Green was used in retellings of the origin, with even reprints of the original story being recolored for the next two decades, until The Incredible Hulk vol. 2, #302 (December 1984) reintroduced the gray Hulk in flashbacks set close to the origin story. An exception is the early trade paperback, Origins of Marvel Comics, from 1974, which explains the difficulties in keeping the gray color consistent in a Stan Lee-written prologue, and reprints the origin story keeping the gray coloration. Since December 1984, reprints of the first issue have displayed the original gray coloring, with the fictional canon specifying that the Hulk's skin had initially been gray.

Lee gave the Hulk's alter ego the alliterative name "Bruce Banner" because he found he had less difficulty remembering alliterative names. Despite this, in later stories he misremembered the character's name and referred to him as "Bob Banner", an error which readers quickly picked up on. The discrepancy was resolved by giving the character the official full name "Robert Bruce Banner".

The Hulk got his name from a comic book character named The Heap, who was a large green swamp monster.

== Publication history ==
=== 1960s ===
The character first appeared in The Incredible Hulk #1 (cover dated May 1962), written by writer-editor Stan Lee, penciled and co-plotted by Jack Kirby, and inked by Paul Reinman. The series lasted six issues until March 1963. Lee had written each story, with Kirby penciling the first five issues and Steve Ditko penciling and inking the sixth. The character immediately guest-starred in The Fantastic Four #12 (March 1963). Months later, Hulk became a founding member of the superhero team the Avengers, appearing in the first two issues of the team's eponymous series (Sept. and Nov. 1963). José Alaniz argues that the most striking feature of these issues is "the Hulk's utter alienation." The character returned to Avengers as an antagonist in issue #3 and as an ally in #5 (Jan.–May 1964). He then guest-starred in Fantastic Four #25–26 (April–May 1964), which revealed Banner's full name as Robert Bruce Banner, and The Amazing Spider-Man #14 (July 1964).

The Incredible Hulk#1 (May 1962). Cover art by Jack Kirby and Paul Reinman.

Around this time, co-creator Kirby received a letter from a college dormitory stating the Hulk had been chosen as its official mascot. Kirby and Lee realized their character had found an audience in college-age readers.

A year and a half after The Incredible Hulk was canceled, the Hulk became one of two features in Tales to Astonish, beginning in issue #60 (Oct. 1964).

This new Hulk feature was initially scripted by Lee, with pencils by Steve Ditko and inks by George Roussos. Other artists later in this run included Jack Kirby (#68–87, June 1965 – Oct. 1966); Gil Kane (credited as "Scott Edwards", #76, (Feb. 1966)); Bill Everett (#78–84, April–Oct. 1966); John Buscema (#85–87); and Marie Severin. The Tales to Astonish run introduced the super-villains the Leader, who would become the Hulk's nemesis, and the Abomination, another gamma-irradiated being. Marie Severin finished out the Hulk's run in Tales to Astonish. Beginning with issue #102 (April 1968) the book was retitled The Incredible Hulk vol. 2, and ran until 1999, when Marvel canceled the series and launched Hulk #1. Marvel filed for a trademark for "The Incredible Hulk" in 1967, and the United States Patent and Trademark Office issued the registration in 1970.

=== 1970s ===
Len Wein wrote the series from 1974 through 1978, working first with Herb Trimpe, then, as of issue #194 (December 1975), with Sal Buscema, who was the regular artist for ten years. Issues #180–181 (Oct.–Nov. 1974) introduced Wolverine as an antagonist, who would go on to become one of Marvel Comics' most popular characters. In 1977, Marvel launched a second title, The Rampaging Hulk, a black-and-white comics magazine. This was originally conceived as a flashback series, set between the end of his original, short-lived solo title and the beginning of his feature in Tales to Astonish. After nine issues, the magazine was retitled The Hulk! and printed in color.

In 1977, two Hulk television films were aired to strong ratings, leading to an Incredible Hulk TV series that aired from 1978 to 1982. A huge ratings success, the series introduced the popular Hulk catchphrase "Don't make me angry. You wouldn't like me when I'm angry", and broadened the character's popularity from a niche comic book readership into the mainstream consciousness.

=== 1980s ===
Bill Mantlo became the series' writer for five years beginning with issue #245 (March 1980). Mantlo's "Crossroads of Eternity" stories (#300–313 (Oct. 1984 – Nov. 1985)) explored the idea that Banner had suffered child abuse. Later Hulk writers Peter David and Greg Pak have called these stories an influence on their approaches to the character. Mantlo left the series for Alpha Flight and that series' writer John Byrne took over The Incredible Hulk. The final issue of Byrne's six issue run featured the wedding of Bruce Banner and Betty Ross. David began a 12-year run with issue #331 (May 1987). He returned to the Roger Stern and Mantlo abuse storylines, expanding the damage caused, and depicting Banner as suffering dissociative identity disorder (DID).

=== 1990s and after ===
In 1998, David killed off Banner's long-time love Betty Ross. Marvel executives used Ross' death as an opportunity to pursue the return of the Savage Hulk. David disagreed, leading to his parting ways with Marvel. Also in 1998, Marvel relaunched The Rampaging Hulk as a standard comic book rather than as a comics magazine. The Incredible Hulk was again cancelled with issue #474 of its second volume in March 1999 and was replaced with a new series, Hulk the following month, with returning writer Byrne and art by Ron Garney. New series writer Paul Jenkins developed the Hulk's multiple dissociative identities, and his run was followed by Bruce Jones with his run featuring Banner being pursued by a secret conspiracy and aided by the mysterious Mr. Blue. Jones appended his 43-issue Incredible Hulk run with the limited series Hulk/Thing: Hard Knocks #1–4 (Nov. 2004 – Feb. 2005), which Marvel published after putting the ongoing series on hiatus. Peter David, who had initially signed a contract for the six-issue Tempest Fugit limited series, returned as writer when it was decided to make that story the first five parts of the revived (vol. 3). After a four-part tie-in to the "House of M" storyline and a one-issue epilogue, David left the series once more, citing the need to do non-Hulk work for the sake of his career.

Writer Greg Pak took over the series in 2006, leading the Hulk through several crossover storylines including "Planet Hulk" and "World War Hulk", which left the Hulk temporarily incapacitated and replaced as the series' title character by the demigod Hercules in the retitled The Incredible Hercules (Feb. 2008). The Hulk returned periodically in Hulk, which then starred the new Red Hulk. In September 2009, The Incredible Hulk was relaunched as The Incredible Hulk (vol. 2) #600. The series was retitled The Incredible Hulks with issue #612 (Nov. 2010) to encompass the Hulk's expanded family, and ran until issue #635 (Oct. 2011) when it was replaced with The Incredible Hulk (vol. 3) (15 issues, Dec. 2011 – Dec. 2012) written by Jason Aaron with art by Marc Silvestri. As part of Marvel's 2012 Marvel NOW! relaunch, a series called Indestructible Hulk (Nov. 2012) debuted under the creative team of Mark Waid and Leinil Yu. This series was replaced in 2014 with The Hulk by Waid and artist Mark Bagley.

A new series titled The Immortal Hulk, written by Al Ewing and drawn by Joe Bennett, was launched in 2018 and ran for 50 issues. The series had a spin-off one-shot Immortal She-Hulk and a spin-off series about Gamma Flight in June 2021.

In November 2021, Donny Cates became the new writer of Hulk, with Ryan Ottley joining as artist. In May 2022, the series did a crossover with the Thor series, also written by Cates, entitled Hulk vs Thor: Banner of War. The series ran for 14 issues, with Ottley taking over as writer for the last 4 issues afters Cates left the book.

In March 2023, it was announced that a new volume of The Incredible Hulk would launch in June 2023, written by Phillip Kennedy Johnson and drawn by Nic Klein.

== Characterization ==
=== Fictional character biography ===
Hulk, as he appeared on a pin-up from the comic book issue Fantastic Four Annual#1 (July 1963). Art by the character's co-creator Jack Kirby.

Robert Bruce Banner's psyche was profoundly affected by his troubled childhood, in which his father, Brian Banner, regarded him as a monster due to his seemingly unnatural intellect from a young age. These experiences caused Bruce to develop a dissociative identity disorder and repress his negative emotions as a coping mechanism. After Brian killed Bruce's mother in a fit of rage, Bruce lived with several relatives up until his high school years, when his intelligence caught the attention of the United States Army. Banner was recruited to develop nuclear weapons under the authority of General Thaddeus "Thunderbolt" Ross, and soon developed a relationship with the General's daughter Betty Ross.

During the experimental detonation of a gamma bomb, Banner saves teenager Rick Jones, who was dared onto the testing field; Banner pushes Jones into a trench to save him, but is hit with the blast, absorbing massive amounts of gamma radiation. He awakens later seemingly unscathed, but he begins transforming into a powerful and destructive creature upon nightfall, which a pursuing soldier describes as a "hulk". Banner's attempts to cure himself of these transformations alter their conditions, causing Banner to transform as a response to rage or fear. The Hulk is a founding member of the Avengers, but quickly leaves the group due to their distrust of him. Banner maintains the secret of his dual identity with Rick's aid, but Rick reveals his secret following his assumed death to Major Glenn Talbot who subsequently informed his superiors, forcing Banner to become a fugitive upon returning from the future where he was actually thrown to.

Psychiatrist Doc Samson captures the Hulk and manages to physically separate Banner and the Hulk, allowing Banner to marry Betty. However, Banner and the Hulk's molecular structure destabilized and threatened to kill them, requiring Samson to reunite them with the aid of Vision. Samson is later able to merge elements of Banner's fractured psyche to create Professor Hulk, an intelligent but egocentric variation of the Hulk. Professor Hulk soon becomes a key member of the Pantheon, a secretive organization of superpowered individuals. His tenure with the organization brings him into conflict with a tyrannical alternate future version of himself called the Maestro, who rules over a world where many heroes are dead. The Professor Hulk construct ultimately proves unstable, and Banner's psyche eventually splinters once more.

In "Planet Hulk", the Illuminati decide the Hulk is too dangerous to remain on Earth and send him away by rocket ship which crashes on the planet Sakaar. The Hulk finds allies in the Warbound and marries alien queen Caiera, a relationship that bears him two sons: Skaar and Hiro-Kala. After the Illuminati's ship explodes and kills Caiera, the Hulk returns to Earth with the Warbound and declares war on the planet in "World War Hulk". However, after learning that Miek, one of the Warbound, had actually been responsible for the destruction, the Hulk allows himself to be defeated, with Banner subsequently redeeming himself as a hero as he works with and against the new Red Hulk to defeat the new supervillain team the Intelligencia.

Later, the Hulk turns to Doctor Doom to separate himself and Banner, with Doom surgically extracting the elements of the Hulk's brain uniquely belonging to Banner and inserting them into a clone body. Banner eventually re-combines with the Hulk when his cloned body is destroyed in a failed attempt to recreate his original transformation. Following this, Bruce willingly joins the spy organization S.H.I.E.L.D., allowing them to use the Hulk as a weapon in exchange for providing him with the means and funding to create a lasting legacy for himself. When Banner is shot in the head by an assassin, Tony Stark saves him with a variant of the Extremis virus. This procedure creates a new intelligent persona named Doc Green, who concludes that the world is in danger by Gamma Mutates and thus need to be depowered. He creates a cure and removes the powers of A-Bomb (Rick Jones), Skaar, and Red Hulk. Eventually, Doc Green's intellect fades and his normal Hulk form is restored.

When the vision of the Inhuman Ulysses Cain shows a rampaging Hulk standing over the corpses of many superheroes, Banner gives Hawkeye special arrows capable of killing him during a transformation, which Hawkeye accomplishes. The Hulk was first revived by the Hand, then by Hydra, and finally by the Challenger for a contest against the Grandmaster.

When a new Hulk persona called Fractured Son acted out against Banner's treatment of the other personas, Hulk battles the Eldest, who intends to use Hulk to awaken Vinruviel. After freeing Vinruviel, Eldest separates the Hulk and Bruce Banner, then takes over Hulk's body for her own uses.

=== Personality ===
Like other long-lived characters, the Hulk's character and cultural interpretations have changed with time, adding or modifying character traits. The Hulk is typically seen as an immense, green skin hulking brute with larger jaws, exaggerated brows, black hair like Bruce's (but wilder and messy), a lower voice, and intense eyes, wearing only a pair of torn pants that survive his physical transformation as the character progressed. As Bruce Banner, the character is about 5 ft 10 in (1.78 m) tall and weighs 167 lbs (75.75 kg), but when transformed into the Hulk, the character stands between 7 and 8 ft (2.13 - 2.43 m) tall and weighs between 1,040 and 1,400 lbs (471.73 - 635.02 kg). The Gray Hulk stands 6 ft 6 in (1.98 m) tall and weighs 900 lbs (408.23 kg); the Merged Hulk stands 7 ft 6 in (2.28 m) tall and weighs 1,150 lbs (521.63 kg); the Green Scar stands 8 ft 8 in (2.64 m) tall and weighs 2,400 lbs (1.08 ton). The Devil Hulk is roughly the same size as Sasquatch, standing around 9 or 10 ft (2.74 / 3.04 m) tall and weighing roughly 2,000 lbs (907.18 kg). Following his debut, Banner's transformations were triggered at nightfall, turning him into a gray-skinned Hulk. In Incredible Hulk #2, the Hulk started to appear with green skin, and in Avengers #3 (1963) Banner realized that his transformations were now triggered by surges of adrenaline in response to feelings of fear, pain or anger. Incredible Hulk #227 (1978) established that the Hulk's separate identity was not due to the mutation affecting his brain, but because Banner was suffering from dissociative identity disorder, with the savage Green Hulk representing Banner's repressed childhood rage and aggression, and the Gray Hulk representing Banner's repressed selfish desires and urges.

==== Identities ====
===== Bruce Banner =====
During his decades of publication, Banner has been portrayed differently, but common themes persist. Banner, a physicist who earned his Ph.D. in nuclear physics from the California Institute of Technology (Caltech), is sarcastic and seemingly very self-assured when he first appears in Incredible Hulk #1, but is also emotionally withdrawn. Banner designed the gamma bomb that caused his affliction, and the ironic twist of his self-inflicted fate has been one of the most persistent common themes. Arie Kaplan describes the character thus: "Robert Bruce Banner lives in a constant state of panic, always wary that the monster inside him will erupt, and therefore he cannot form meaningful bonds with anyone." As a child, Banner's father Brian often got mad and physically abused both Banner and his mother, creating the psychological complex of fear, anger, and the fear of anger and the destruction it can cause that underlies the character. Banner has been shown to be emotionally repressed, but capable of deep love for Betty Ross and solving problems posed to him. Under the writing of Paul Jenkins, Banner was shown to be a capable fugitive, applying deductive reasoning and observation to figure out the events transpiring around him. On the occasions that Banner controlled the Hulk's body, he applied principles of physics to problems and challenges and used deductive reasoning. It was shown after his ability to turn into the Hulk was taken away by the red Hulk that Banner has been extremely versatile as well as cunning when dealing with the many situations that followed. When he was briefly separated from the Hulk by Doom, Banner became criminally insane, driven by his desire to regain the power of the Hulk, but once the two recombined he came to accept that he was a better person with the Hulk to provide something for him to focus on controlling rather than allowing his intellect to run without restraint against the world.

===== Hulk =====
The traditional Hulk, often called "Savage Hulk", was originally shown as gray and average in intelligence. He roamed aimlessly and became annoyed at "puny" humans who took him for a dangerous monster. Shortly after becoming the Hulk, his transformation continued turning him green, coinciding with him beginning to display primitive speech. By Incredible Hulk #4, radiation treatments gave Banner's mind complete control of the Hulk's body. While Banner relished his indestructibility and power, he was quick to anger and more aggressive in his Hulk form. He became known as a hero alongside the Avengers, but his increasing paranoia caused him to leave the group. He was convinced that he would never be trusted.

Originally, the Hulk was shown as simple-minded and quick to anger. The Hulk generally divorces his identity from Banner's, decrying Banner as "puny Banner." From his earliest stories, the Hulk has been concerned with finding sanctuary and quiet. He is often shown to quickly react emotionally to situations. Grest and Weinberg call Hulk the "dark, primordial side of Banner's psyche." Even in the earliest appearances, Hulk spoke in the third person. Hulk retains a modest intelligence, thinking and talking in full sentences. Lee even gives the Hulk expository dialogue in issue #6, allowing readers to learn just what capabilities Hulk has, when the Hulk says, "But these muscles ain't just for show! All I gotta do is spring up and just keep goin'!" In the 1970s, Hulk was shown as more prone to anger and rage, and less talkative. Writers played with the nature of his transformations, briefly giving Banner control over the change, and the ability to maintain control of his Hulk form. Artistically and conceptually, the character has become progressively more muscular and powerful in the years since his debut.

===== Joe Fixit =====
Originally, Stan Lee wanted the Hulk to be gray. Due to ink problems, Hulk's color was changed to green. This was later changed in the story to indicate that the Gray Hulk and the Savage Hulk are separate dissociative identities or entities fighting for control in Bruce's subconscious. The Gray Hulk incarnation can do the more unscrupulous things that Banner could not bring himself to do, with many sources comparing the Gray Hulk to the moody teenager that Banner never allowed himself to be. While the Gray Hulk still had the-madder-he-gets, the-stronger-he-gets part that is similar to the Savage Hulk, it is on a much slower rate. It is said by the Leader that the Gray Hulk is stronger on nights of the new moon and weaker on nights of the full moon. Originally, the night is when Bruce Banner became the Gray Hulk and changed back by dawn. In later comics, willpower or stress would have Banner turn into the Gray Hulk. During one storyline where he was placed under a spell to prevent him turning back into Bruce Banner and publicly presumed dead when he was teleported away from a gamma bomb explosion that destroyed an entire town, the Gray Hulk adopted a specific name as Joe Fixit, a security expert for Las Vegas casino owner Michael Berengetti, with the Gray Hulk often being referred to as Joe after these events. Joe Fixit later gained the ability to transform into a version of Red Hulk in the Below-Place.

===== Merged Hulk =====
Convinced that unaided, the Banner, Green Hulk, and Gray Hulk identities would eventually destroy each other, Doc Samson uses hypnosis to merge the three to create a new single identity combining Banner's intelligence with the Gray Hulk's and Banner's attitudes and the Green Hulk's body. This new Merged Hulk, Professor Hulk, or simply Smart Hulk, considered himself cured and began a new life, but the merger was not perfect, and the Hulk sometimes still considered Banner a separate person, and when overcome with rage the Merged Hulk would transform back into Banner's human body while still thinking himself the Hulk. The Merged Hulk is the largest of the three primary Hulk incarnations. While in a calm emotional state, the Merged Hulk is stronger than Savage Hulk when he is calm. Unlike the Savage Hulk and the Gray Hulk, Banner subconsciously installed a type of safeguard within this incarnation. The safeguard is that when the Merged Hulk gets angry, he regresses back to Banner with the mind of the Savage Hulk.

===== Doc Green =====
A variation of the Merged Hulk identity takes on the name Doc Green as the result of Extremis fixing Hulk's brain, becoming powerful enough to destroy Tony Stark's mansion with one thunderclap. This form was also known as Omega Hulk. It was theorized by Doc Green that this form was an earlier incarnation of his possible future form Maestro.

===== The Devil Hulk =====
The Devil Hulk, or simply the Devil, is the result of the Hulk needing a father figure. While the character's physical appearance varies, he is always depicted as having glowing red eyes and reptilian traits. The new form of the Devil Hulk is the result of Banner and Hulk having been through different deaths and rebirths. This incarnation is articulate, smart, and cunning, and does merciless attacks on those who do harm. Unlike the other Hulk incarnations, the Devil Hulk is content with waiting inside Bruce. If Bruce is injured by sunset, the Devil Hulk will emerge with his transformation being limited to night-time. Thanks to the Devil Hulk side and Banner working together, the Devil Hulk can maintain his form in sunlight.

=== Powers and abilities ===
==== Bruce Banner ====
Considered to be one of the greatest scientific minds on Earth, Banner possesses "a mind so brilliant it cannot be measured on any known intelligence test." Norman Osborn estimates that he is the fourth most-intelligent person on Earth. Banner holds expertise in biology, chemistry, engineering, medicine, physiology, and nuclear physics. Using this knowledge, he creates advanced technology dubbed "Bannertech", which is on par with technological development from Tony Stark or Doctor Doom. These technologies include a teleporter and a force field that can protect him from the attacks of Hulk-level entities.

==== The Hulk ====
The Hulk possesses the potential for seemingly limitless physical strength that is influenced by his emotional state, particularly his anger. This has been reflected in the repeated comment "The madder Hulk gets, the stronger Hulk gets." The cosmically powerful entity known as the Beyonder once analyzed the Hulk's physiology, and claimed that the Hulk's potential strength had "no finite element inside." Hulk's strength has been depicted as sometimes limited by Banner's subconscious influence; when Jean Grey psionically "shut Banner off", Hulk became strong enough to overpower and destroy the physical form of the villain Onslaught. Writer Greg Pak described the Worldbreaker Hulk shown during World War Hulk as having a level of physical power where "Hulk was stronger than any mortal—and most immortals—who ever walked the Earth" and depicted the character as powerful enough to completely destroy entire planets. The Hulk has been able to lift incredible and impossible weights. In the comic Infinity #6, for example, he managed to lift the weight of a star. If the weight of that star were equivalent to the weight of the sun, he would be able to lift 2 octillion metric tons. A feat somewhat similar to that occurred in the comic Incredible Hulk #102 (part of the Planet Hulk), in which the Hulk holds up the tectonic plates of the planet Sakaar with his bare hands, expending at least 225 quintillion joules to accomplish this feat. His strength allows him to leap into lower Earth orbit or across continents, and he has displayed superhuman speed. Exposure to radiation has also been shown to make the Hulk stronger. It is unknown how he gains biomass during transformation but it may be linked to the One Below All.

His durability, regeneration, and endurance also increase in proportion to his temper. Hulk is resistant to injury or damage, though the degree to which varies between interpretations, but he has withstood the equivalent of solar temperatures, nuclear explosions, and planet-shattering impacts. Despite his remarkable resiliency, continuous barrages of high-caliber gunfire can hinder his movement to some degree while he can be temporarily subdued by intense attacks with chemical weapons such as anesthetic gases, although any interruption of such dosages will allow him to quickly recover. He has been shown to have both regenerative and adaptive healing abilities, including growing tissues to allow him to breathe underwater, surviving unprotected in space for extended periods, and when injured, healing from most wounds within seconds, including, on one occasion, the complete destruction of most of his body mass. His future self, the "Maestro", was even eventually able to recover from being blown to pieces. As an effect, he has an extremely prolonged lifespan, theoretically immortal.

He also possesses less commonly described powers, including abilities allowing him to "home in" to his place of origin in New Mexico; resist psychic control, or unwilling transformation; grow stronger from radiation or dark magic; punch his way between separate temporal or spatial dimensions; and to see and interact with astral forms. Some of these abilities were in later years explained as being related; his ability to home in on the New Mexico bomb site was due to his latent ability to sense astral forms and spirits, since the bomb site was also the place where the Maestro's skeleton was and the Maestro's spirit was calling out to him in order to absorb his radiation.

Similar to Banner, the Hulk views himself as a separate entity from Banner and often resents Banner's efforts to contain the Hulk within himself. Unlike Banner, the Hulk's is generally portrayed as having a negative, anti social personality when he isn't fighting and is often dismissive of most people who try to interact with him. Unable to maintain the same level of control Banner has over the transformations, the Hulk could initially only remain in his form for only short periods of time depending on the source of Banner's aggression that caused the transformation. This changed after the Hulk was exiled into Space by the Illuminati, angering him to the point where the Hulk was able to completely suppress Banner for an extended period of time. He is also shown to have a separate memory to Bruce Banner - when Spider-Man has the knowledge of his secret identity erased during Spider-Man: One More Day, the Hulk later asks how Peter is doing, not Spider-Man; upon questioning, he enigmatically states "Banner forgot. But I don't forget."

In the first Hulk comic series, "massive" doses of gamma rays would cause the Hulk to transform back to Banner, although this ability was written out of the character by the 1970s.

== Supporting characters ==
Over the long publication history of the Hulk's adventures, many recurring characters have featured prominently, including his best friend and sidekick Rick Jones, love interest and wife Betty Ross and her father, the often adversarial General "Thunderbolt" Ross. Both Banner and Hulk have families created in their respective personas. Banner is son to Brian, an abusive father who killed Banner's mother while she tried to protect her son from his father's delusional attacks, and cousin to Jennifer Walters, the She-Hulk, who serves as his frequent ally. Banner had a stillborn child with Betty, while the Hulk has two sons with his deceased second wife Caiera, Skaar and Hiro-Kala, and his DNA was used to create a daughter named Lyra with Thundra.

The Fantastic Four #12 (March 1963), featured the Hulk's first battle with the Thing. Although many early Hulk stories involve Ross trying to capture or destroy the Hulk, the main villain is often a radiation-based character, like the Gargoyle or the Leader, along with other foes such as the Toad Men, or Asian warlord General Fang. Ross' daughter Betty loves Banner and criticizes her father for pursuing the Hulk. General Ross' right-hand man, Major Glenn Talbot, also loves Betty and is torn between pursuing Hulk and trying to gain Betty's love more honorably. Rick Jones serves as the Hulk's friend and sidekick in these early tales. The Hulk's archenemies are the Abomination and the Leader. The Abomination is more monstrous-looking, twice as strong as the Hulk at normal levels (however, the Abomination's strength levels do not increase when he gets angry) and wreaks havoc for fun and pleasure. The Leader is a gamma-irradiated super-genius who has tried plan after plan to take over the world.

== Cultural impact ==
The Hulk character and the concepts behind it have been raised to the level of iconic status by many within and outside the comic book industry. In 2003, Official U.S. PlayStation Magazine claimed the character had "stood the test of time as a genuine icon of American pop culture." In 2008, the Hulk was listed as the 19th greatest comic book character by Wizard magazine. Empire magazine named him as the 14th-greatest comic-book character and the fifth-greatest Marvel character. In 2011, the Hulk placed No. 9 on IGN's list of "Top 100 Comic Book Heroes", and fourth on their list of "The Top 50 Avengers" in 2012.

=== Analysis ===
The Hulk is often viewed as a reaction to war. As well as being a reaction to the Cold War, the character has been a cipher for the frustrations the Vietnam War raised, and Ang Lee said that the Iraq War influenced his direction. In the Michael Nyman edited edition of The Guardian, Stefanie Diekmann explored Marvel Comics' reaction to the September 11 attacks. Diekmann discussed The Hulk's appearance in the 9/11 tribute comic Heroes, claiming that his greater prominence, alongside Captain America, aided in "stressing the connection between anger and justified violence without having to depict anything more than a well-known and well-respected protagonist." In Marvel: Five Fabulous Decades of the World's Greatest Comics, Les Daniels addresses the Hulk as an embodiment of cultural fears of radiation and nuclear science. He quotes Jack Kirby thus: "As long as we're experimenting with radioactivity, there's no telling what may happen, or how much our advancements in science may cost us." Daniels continues, "The Hulk became Marvel's most disturbing embodiment of the perils inherent in the atomic age."

In Comic Book Nation, Bradford Wright alludes to Hulk's counterculture status, referring to a 1965 Esquire magazine poll amongst college students which "revealed that student radicals ranked Spider-Man and the Hulk alongside the likes of Bob Dylan and Che Guevara as their favorite revolutionary icons." Wright goes on to cite examples of his anti-authority symbol status. Two of these are "The Ballad of the Hulk" by Jerry Jeff Walker, and the Rolling Stone cover for September 30, 1971, a full color Herb Trimpe piece commissioned for the magazine. The Hulk has been caricatured in such animated television series as The Simpsons, Robot Chicken, and Family Guy, and such comedy TV series as The Young Ones. The character is also used as a cultural reference point for someone displaying anger or agitation. For example, in a 2008 Daily Mirror review of an EastEnders episode, a character is described as going "into Incredible Hulk mode, smashing up his flat." In September 2019, British Prime Minister Boris Johnson likened himself to The Hulk in an interview with the Mail On Sunday, as political pressure built on him to request an extension to the date of the UK's withdrawal from the European Union.

The Hulk, especially his alter ego Bruce Banner, is also a common reference in hip-hop. The term was represented as an analogue to marijuana in Dr. Dre's 2001, while more conventional references are made in Ludacris and Jermaine Dupri's popular single "Welcome to Atlanta".

The 2003 Ang Lee-directed Hulk film saw discussion of the character's appeal to Asian Americans. The Taiwanese-born Ang Lee commented on the "subcurrent of repression" that underscored the character of The Hulk, and how that mirrored his own experience: "Growing up, my artistic leanings were always repressed—there was always pressure to do something 'useful,' like being a doctor." Jeff Yang, writing for the San Francisco Chronicle, extended this self-identification to Asian American culture, arguing that "the passive-aggressive streak runs deep among Asian Americans—especially those who have entered creative careers, often against their parents' wishes."

There have been explorations about the real-world possibility of Hulk's gamma-radiation-based origin. In The Science of Superheroes, Lois Grest and Robert Weinberg examined Hulk's powers, explaining the scientific flaws in them. Most notably, they point out that the level of gamma radiation Banner is exposed to at the initial blast would induce radiation sickness and kill him, or if not, create significant cancer risks for Banner, because hard radiation strips cells of their ability to function. They go on to offer up an alternate origin, in which a Hulk might be created by biological experimentation with adrenal glands and GFP. Charles Q. Choi from LiveScience.com further explains that, unlike the Hulk, gamma rays are not green; existing as they do beyond the visible spectrum, gamma rays have no color at all that we can describe. He also explains that gamma rays are so powerful (the most powerful form of electromagnetic radiation and 10,000 times more powerful than visible light) that they can even convert energy into matter – a possible explanation for the increased mass that Bruce Banner takes on during transformations. "Just as the Incredible Hulk 'is the strongest one there is,' as he says himself, so too are gamma-ray bursts the most powerful explosions known."

== Other Marvel Comics characters called the Hulk ==
Prior to the debut of the Hulk in May 1962, Marvel had earlier monster characters that used the name the "Hulk", but had no direct relation.

- In Strange Tales #75 (June 1960), Albert Poole built an armor he called the Hulk. In modern-day reprints, the character's name was changed to Grutan.
- In Journey into Mystery #62 (Nov. 1960) was Xemnu the Living Hulk, a huge, furry alien monster who went by the name of the Hulk. Coincidentally, the character's debut story was also illustrated by Jack Kirby. The character reappeared in issue #66 (March 1961). Since then the character has been a mainstay in the Marvel Universe, and was renamed Xemnu the Living Titan.
- A huge, orange, slimy monster called the Hulk was featured in a movie titled The Hulk in Tales to Astonish #21 (July 1961). In modern-day reprints, the character's name was changed to the Glop.

== In other media ==
The character has been played in live-action and animation by a variety of actors. The character was first played in live-action by Bill Bixby and Lou Ferrigno in the 1978 television series The Incredible Hulk and its subsequent television films The Incredible Hulk Returns (1988), The Trial of the Incredible Hulk (1989), and The Death of the Incredible Hulk (1990), and Eric Bana in the film Hulk (2003). In the Marvel Cinematic Universe (MCU), the character was first portrayed by Edward Norton in the film The Incredible Hulk (2008) and by Mark Ruffalo in later appearances, including the films The Avengers (2012), Iron Man 3 (2013), Avengers: Age of Ultron (2015), Thor: Ragnarok (2017), Avengers: Infinity War (2018), Captain Marvel (2019), Avengers: Endgame (2019), Shang-Chi and the Legend of the Ten Rings (2021), and Spider-Man: Brand New Day (2026), and the television series She-Hulk: Attorney at Law (2022) and What If...? (2021). Fred Tatasciore has voiced Hulk in various television series and video games, including The Avengers: Earth's Mightiest Heroes and Avengers Assemble.

== Reception ==
The Hulk was ranked #1 on a listing of Marvel Comics' monster characters in 2015.

In 2018, CBR.com ranked The Thing (Bruce Banner) 2nd in their "Age of Apocalypse: The 30 Strongest Characters in Marvel's Coolest Alternate World" list.

In 2022, Screen Rant included Hulk in their "10 Most Powerful Hercules Villains in Marvel Comics" list.

== See also ==
- List of Marvel Comics superhero debuts
- List of actors who have played Hulk

== Bibliography ==
- José Alaniz (2023). The Avengers. Penguin Books. ISBN 978-0-14-313578-4.
- Beatty, Scott (2012). Avengers: The Ultimate Guide. DK. ISBN 978-1-4654-6682-2.
