= Carlo Pagulayan =

Canadian-born comics artist

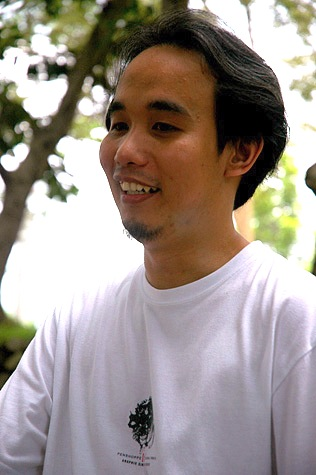
- Born: June 24, 1978 (age 48) Tanauan, Batangas
- Area: Penciller
- Notable works: Deathstroke; Planet Hulk; Batman

Carlo Pagulayan (born June 24, 1978) is a Filipino freelance comic book artist.

== Early life ==
He graduated with a bachelor's degree in Industrial Engineering from the Santo Tomas branch campus of the Polytechnic University of the Philippines in Santo Tomas, Batangas.

== Career ==
Pagulayan began his career with a three-page sequential for Dark Horse Comics, written by Doug Petrie, to aid the victims of the 9-11 attacks, and as a tribute to the fallen World Trade Center Twin Towers (2001). He has since had assignments with both Marvel and DC, including runs on Elektra, Emma Frost, The Incredible Hulk, and Deathstroke.

He was a penciler on Marvel's popular Planet Hulk storyline, which was adapted into an animated feature film in 2010. Elements from the story were also incorporated into the Marvel Studios film Thor: Ragnarok (2017). Pagulayan co-created the Sakaaran race which have appeared in Guardians of the Galaxy (2014) and Avengers: Endgame (2019).

== Bibliography ==
Comics work (interior pencil art) includes:

=== DC ===
- Convergence #1-2, 8 (2015)
- Telos #1-2, 4 (2015–16)
- Batman and Robin Eternal #26 (2016)
- Deathstroke, vol. 4, #1-2, 6–8, 15–16, 19–20, 25, 30–32, 34–35, 42–43, 48-50 (2016–19)
- Deathstroke: Rebirth #1 (2016)
- Wonder Woman, vol. 5, #31, 36-37 (2017)

=== Marvel ===
- Agents of Atlas v2 #1-2, 5, 7-8 (2009)
- Avengers vs. X-Men #1 (2012)
- Elektra #11-15, 18, 21-22 (2002)
- Emma Frost #7-12, 14, 16-18 (2003)
- Hulk #34-35, 50-52 (2011–12)
- Incredible Hulk #92-95, 101, 104–5, 109-10 (2006–07)
- Invincible Iron Man #27 (2008)
- Marvel Adventures Fantastic Four #1-3, 9 (plus covers), (2005)
- Mighty Avengers #20 (2009)
- New X-Men Academy X #9 (2004)
- What If: Sub-Mariner cover (2005)
- X-Men Unlimited #7 (2004)
- X-Men vs. Agents of Atlas #1-2 (2009–10)

=== Other Publishers ===
- WTC Tribute Book, Dark Horse Comics (2001)
- Icons Of Evil: Trap Jaw, MVCreations (2002)
