= Shockwave (comics) =

Publication information
- Publisher: Marvel Comics
- First appearance: Master of Kung Fu #42 (July 1976)
- Created by: Tom Sutton; Doug Moench; Paul Gulacy

In-story information
- Alter ego: Lancaster Sneed
- Species: Human Cyborg
- Team affiliations: MI6; Oriental Expediters; Golden Dagger Sect; S.H.I.E.L.D. Masters of Evil
- Abilities: Master martial artist Trained armed/unarmed combatant Expert on electrical devices Skilled demolition worker Enhanced strength, speed, agility, stamina, durability and reflexes Via exoskeleton armor suit: Electrical shock generation

Shockwave (Lancaster Sneed) is a fictional character appearing in American comic books published by Marvel Comics.

== Publication history ==
Shockwave first appeared in Master of Kung Fu #42 (July 1976), and he was created by Tom Sutton, Doug Moench and Paul Gulacy.

== Fictional character biography ==
Lancaster Sneed was born in Newcastle-on-Tyne, England, and is the nephew of Sir Denis Nayland Smith. Before becoming an intelligence agent for the British agency MI-6, he was a carnival performer. After he stole an experimental exoskeleton, he became the professional criminal and mercenary known as Shockwave. He conspired to kill his uncle and Black Jack Tarr, and first battled Shang-Chi. He was revealed as Smith's nephew and was defeated by Shang-Chi.

He apparently returned later, and Shang-Chi thought he was fighting the real Shockwave but was in fact it was a robot duplicate controlled by Doctor Doom. The real Shockwave was later brainwashed by MI-6, and attacked his uncle, and battled Clive Reston and Shang-Chi. Alongside Brynocki, Shockwave battled Shang-Chi and Leiko Wu on Mordillo Island. When Brynocki turns against him, Shockwave battled Brynocki and his robots alongside Shang-Chi, Wu, and Black Jack Tarr.

As Shockwave he has been a member of the Oriental Expediters and the Golden Dagger Sect. He has been the ally of many masterminds and criminals including Fah Lo Suee, Tarrant/Griswold, and Fu Manchu.

The second Crimson Cowl recruited Shockwave to join her incarnation of the Masters of Evil.

During the "Civil War" storyline, Shockwave is captured by Heroes for Hire. He is one of the 142 registered superheroes who have registered as part of the Fifty State Initiative.

Shockwave is part of a group of Shang-Chi's enemies that includes Razor Fist, Shen Kuei, Death-Hand, Shadow Stalker, Tiger-Claw and Midnight Sun that ambushes the Master of Kung Fu and Domino while the two are on a date in Hong Kong. Shockwave is defeated after one of his shocks aimed for Domino misses and hits Shadow-Stalker, whose flail is deflected off of a serving tray thrown by Domino and hits Shockwave in the face, knocking him out. After the fight, Shang-Chi warns the group to retreat and forget the ambush ever took place or to face further attacks from Domino.

== Powers and abilities ==
Lancaster Sneed is a master of various martial arts, especially karate. He was trained in armed and unarmed combat by British military intelligence. He is an expert on electrical devices, and skilled in demolitions work. His body was surgically rebuilt using metal plates, enhancing his strength, speed, agility, stamina, durability and reflexes, but not to superhuman levels. He wears a stolen exoskeleton body armor suit which is equipped with an apparatus that generates electrical shocks on contact.

The suit is later waterproofed to prevent shorting out on contact with water.

== In other media ==
=== Television ===
Shockwave appears in the Iron Man: Armored Adventures episode "Armor Wars", voiced by an uncredited actor. This version is a member of Obadiah Stane's Guardsmen and a former Maggia enforcer.

=== Video games ===
- Shockwave appears in Marvel Avengers Alliance as a victim of the Circle of Eight.
- Shockwave appears in Captain America: The Winter Soldier - The Official Game. This version is a member of the terrorist organization R.A.I.D.
