= Clive Reston =

Publication information
- Publisher: Marvel Comics
- First appearance: Giant-Size Master of Kung Fu #3 (December 1974)
- Created by: Doug Moench; Paul Gulacy

In-story information
- Alter ego: Clive Reston
- Species: Human
- Partnerships: Shang-Chi; Leiko Wu; Black Jack Tarr
- Abilities: None

Clive Reston is a fictional character appearing in American comic books published by Marvel Comics. The character was patterned on James Bond and Roper from the Bruce Lee Movie Enter the Dragon. Clive Reston was an agent of MI-6 and an ally to Denis Nayland Smith and Shang-Chi. During his time with MI-6, he started a relationship with Leiko Wu, but she left him for Simon Bretnor who turned out to be the mad assassin Mordillo.

== Publication history ==
Clive Reston first appeared in Giant-Size Master of Kung Fu issue three, in 1974, created by Doug Moench. He went on to be a recurring character in the Master of Kung Fu series, as well as occasionally appearing in other series such as Rom and X-Men. He also recently appeared in the MAX series Wisdom, centered on the character Pete Wisdom. Now, of course, it is widely known that Shang-Chi was basically Sax Rohmer’s Fu Manchu novels fused together with Bruce Lee movies, but there is much of the concept that had been inspired by Enter the Dragon. Bruce Lee's character in the movie practically is Shang-Chi, and his uneasy alliance with wisecracking pal Roper John Saxon echoes, in many ways, Shang-Chi's give-and-take with agent Clive Reston. Saxon's image was replaced with that of Sean Connery.

== Fictional character biography ==
Reston first appeared as an ally to Shang-Chi, the master of kung fu. He also had a romantic relationship with Melissa Greville, and the two were both present at the funeral of James Larner. He allows her to stay with him after she is released from hospital after having been injured by a gunshot wound, and she reveals to him that her mother knows his father. The pair were subsequently arrested in Hong Kong, after they were framed for committing an explosion at a place called the Jade Peacock. They discovered that they had been set up and that the policemen were criminals in disguise. After escaping from custody, they contacted MI-6, who helped them locate the secret base of the villain, Kogar, where they engaged in a fight with Kogar's men, before they engaged in a fight with and defeated Kogar. Reston then returned to England.

Reston then encountered the villain Shockwave, who attacked him. He then discovered that former MI-6 agents were trying to kill him, Melissa and his companion Sir Denis. In order to escape, they traveled to a remote estate in Scotland, where they were all captured by a group led by MI-6's chief Ward Sarsfield, before they were rescued by Black Jack Tarr.

Melissa then agreed to act as bait in order to capture a serial killer, dubbed, Jack the Ripper. The trap worked, and Jack the Ripper was attacked and killed by Reston and Shang Chi. Later, he told her that their relationship was off, although she continues to love him.

Reston was seen in London helping Pete Wisdom fight off an invading army of Martians and Jack the Rippers.

== Powers and abilities ==
Reston possesses no superhuman powers or abilities, although he is a very talented agent. Clive's weapon of choice is an ASP 9mm handgun.

== In other media ==
- Clive Reston appears in a deleted scene in Black Panther: Wakanda Forever, portrayed by an unidentified actor. He apparently has had history with Everett Ross for "blowing [his] cover in Tehran". Ross chloroforms him and poses as him while regaling about his attempts at capturing Spymaster.
