= Shang-Chi =

Marvel Comics superhero

- Shang-Chi as seen on the textless variant cover of Shang-Chi Vol. 1 #1 (November 2020). Art by Jim Cheung and Laura Martin.

Publication information
- Publisher: Marvel Comics
- First appearance: Special Marvel Edition #15 (December 1973)
- Created by: Steve Englehart; Jim Starlin

In-story information
- Full name: Zheng Shang-Chi
- Team affiliations: Avengers; Avengers Emergency Response Squad; Agents of Atlas; Five Weapons Society; MI-6; Marvel Knights; Heroes for Hire; Secret Avengers; Thunderbolts
- Partnerships: Clive Reston; Black Jack Tarr; Leiko Wu; Iron Fist; Lin Lie
- Notable aliases: Master of Kung Fu
- Abilities: Master martial artist; Mastery of chi; Psionic abilities; Abilities via the Ten Rings: Superhuman strength, speed, durability and stamina; Flight; Projectile attacks and chain generation; Mystical energy generation, manipulation and projection; Portal creation; Teleportation

Shang-Chi
- Traditional Chinese: 鄭尚氣
- Simplified Chinese: 郑尚气
Transcriptions
Standard Mandarin
- Hanyu Pinyin: Zhèng Shàngqì
- Bopomofo: ㄓㄥˋ ㄕㄤˋ ㄑㄧˋ
- Wade–Giles: Chêng^{4} Shang^{4}-ch‘i^{4}
- IPA: [ʈʂə̂ŋ ʂâŋ.tɕʰî]
Yue: Cantonese
- Yale Romanization: Jehng Seuhnghei
- Jyutping: zeng6 soeng6 hei3
- IPA: [tsɛŋ˨ sœŋ˨.hej˧]

Zheng Shang-Chi, (Note: simplified Chinese: 郑尚气 / 郑上气; traditional Chinese: 鄭尚氣 / 鄭上氣; pinyin: Zhèng Shàngqì; Wade–Giles: Cheng Shang^{4}-Ch'i^{4}. In this Chinese name, the family name is Zheng.) also known as the Master of Kung Fu, is a superhero appearing in American comic books published by Marvel Comics. Created by writer Steve Englehart and artist Jim Starlin, the character first appeared in Special Marvel Edition #15 (cover dated December 1973). In the Marvel Universe, Shang-Chi is the son of an immortal criminal mastermind who raised and trained him from childhood to be an assassin; upon discovering his father's true nature, Shang-Chi renounced him and entered into an ongoing, informal alliance with M-I6. He has been described as the greatest martial artist in the Marvel Universe. Englehart and later creators surrounded Shang-Chi with a recurring supporting cast, including the intelligence officer Sir Denis Nayland Smith, the agents Black Jack Tarr and Clive Reston, and his romantic partner Leiko Wu, as well as his father's ambiguous daughter, Fah Lo Suee, and the morally ambiguous rival martial artist Shen Kuei.

Marvel had originally hoped to license the television series Kung Fu, but the rights were unavailable, and the character was instead spun off from novelist Sax Rohmer's licensed pulp villain Fu Manchu as his previously unknown son. With its third issue, the title was renamed Master of Kung Fu, and by the end of 1974 writer Doug Moench and artist Paul Gulacy had taken over the strip, shifting it from stand-alone martial-arts stories toward a globe-trotting espionage format influenced by the James Bond films. The series continued until 1983 and became one of Marvel's best-selling titles during the 1970s martial arts boom. Shang-Chi's connection to Fu Manchu was downplayed in later stories after Marvel's license to the Rohmer estate lapsed, and the character's father was eventually renamed Zheng Zu. Shang-Chi reappeared in numerous series over the following decades, became a member of the Avengers in 2012, and was expanded in the 2020s into the leader of an ancient organization called the Five Weapons Society and the one who acquired the mystical Ten Rings from Ta-Lo.

The character is widely regarded as a comic book superhero version of the persona of Bruce Lee. The series has attracted controversy for its connection to Yellow Peril stereotypes about Chinese culture. It has also been commended for its complex storytelling, innovative artwork, and heroic and unconventional approach to its central protagonist, one of the first Chinese superheroes in mainstream American comic books.

The character has appeared in a range of adaptations. Shang-Chi made his live-action debut in the Marvel Cinematic Universe film Shang-Chi and the Legend of the Ten Rings (2021), in which he is portrayed by Simu Liu. Liu will reprise the role in Avengers: Doomsday (2026).

== Publication history ==
=== Creation and development ===
By the early 1970s, American popular culture had developed a strong appetite for East Asian martial arts. Actor Bruce Lee had introduced his fighting style Jeet Kune Do to television audiences as Kato in The Green Hornet (1966–1967) and later sought to headline a series of his own at Warner Bros.; the studio instead cast David Carradine in the similarly themed Kung Fu, a 1972 television film that became a long-running series. Around the same time, the 1972 Hong Kong film King Boxer, retitled Five Fingers of Death for its American release, became an unexpected hit and opened the door to a wave of imported martial-arts films, while Lee himself, who had relocated to Hong Kong and become a star of low-budget genre pictures there, was brought back to Warner Bros. for what was intended as his American breakout film, Enter the Dragon (1973).

In 1972, writer Steve Englehart and artist Jim Starlin approached DC Comics to adapt Kung Fu into a comic book as DC's parent company, Warner Communications, owned the rights to the series. DC Comics, however, was not interested in their pitch, believing the show's and the martial arts film genre's popularity would fade quickly. The duo then approached Marvel Comics with the idea to create a kung fu-focused original comic. Editor-in-chief Roy Thomas agreed, but only if they would include Sax Rohmer's pulp villain Dr. Fu Manchu as Marvel had previously acquired the comic book rights to the character and made their protagonist half-white. Englehart and Starlin agreed. Englehart saw the series as an opportunity to explore his interest in Eastern philosophy, which was related to his experimentation with LSD. They developed Shang-Chi, a master of kung fu, who was introduced as a previously unknown son of Manchu. Many of Shang-Chi's supporting characters, such as Sir Denis Nayland Smith and Fah Lo Suee, were created by Rohmer for the Fu Manchu stories. The name Shang-Chi was conceived by Englehart through his study of the I-Ching, combining 升 (pinyin: shēng; Wade–Giles: sheng^{1}; lit. 'ascending') with 氣 (Chinese: 气; pinyin: qì; Wade–Giles: ch'i^{4}; lit. 'vital energy'). He translated this to mean "the rising and advancing of a spirit".

At the time Shang-Chi was introduced, there were very few recurrent Asian heroes in mainstream American superhero comic books, although there were several villains. Marvel had previously created Jimmy Woo, a Chinese American secret agent, in 1956, and Wong, a Chinese monk and servant of Doctor Strange, in 1963. Sunfire, a Japanese hero, appeared as a supporting cast member in X-Men beginning in 1970. Shang-Chi was the first Chinese superhero in Marvel Comics, and the first Asian hero to star in his own series. The character is widely believed to have been inspired by Bruce Lee, whose films became extraordinarily popular. Stan Lee later said that "I think we would not have done [Shang-Chi] had there not been a Bruce Lee." Gene Luen Yang writes that Shang-Chi is "essentially the Marvel Universe version of Bruce Lee." Douglas Wolk describes the premise of the series as "Prince Hamlet as Bruce Lee as James Bond." Shang-Chi was not the only martial arts themed character to reach American comics around this time. Earlier and contemporary efforts to incorporate martial arts into the medium included Charlton Comics' Judomaster (1965–1967) and DC's Karate Kid, who had debuted in 1966 but was given little to do for years afterward. Charlton Comics' Yang, a more direct adaptation of the Kung Fu television premise, debuted at almost the same time as Shang-Chi, but was cancelled within three years. Marvel also introduced Iron Fist, another martial-arts themed character, five months after Shang-Chi.

=== 1970s ===
Shang-Chi first appeared in Special Marvel Edition #15 (December 1973), art by Jim Starlin and Al Milgrom

Starlin, who had not read any of Rohmer's Fu Manchu novels before the series began, worked with Englehart and inker Al Milgrom on Shang-Chi's first appearance, published in Special Marvel Edition #15 (cover dated December 1973), a title that had previously reprinted Thor and Sgt. Fury stories. The story establishes Shang-Chi as having been raised and trained by his father, whom he believed to be a benevolent figure. Sent to kill an old man named Dr. Petrie on his father's orders, Shang-Chi carries out the assassination, only to be confronted afterward by the crippled Sir Denis Nayland Smith, who reveals Fu Manchu's true nature. Shang-Chi briefly visits his mother, a character who never reappears in the series, before concluding that his father had deceived him throughout his life. In the following issue, Shang-Chi encounters his adoptive brother, named Midnight, who is a refugee from Africa. Shang-Chi became the starring character of the series, and with issue #17 (April 1974), the publication was renamed The Hands of Shang-Chi, Master of Kung Fu. Starlin left the series after issue #17, because of artistic disagreements and his concern about the anti-Chinese racism of the original Fu Manchu material. Issue #17 also introduced Black Jack Tarr, a retired intelligence operative recruited by Sir Dennis Nayland Smith to avenge Dr. Petrie's death. In April 1974, Marvel launched the black-and-white magazine The Deadly Hands of Kung Fu, reportedly prompted by an offhand comment publisher Stan Lee overheard about the popularity of martial arts films. Shang-Chi appeared there in reprints and new stories, beginning with a prequel by his original creative team and featuring covers and interior art by artists including Neal Adams and Alan Weiss.

Paul Gulacy's work as the series' interior artist began with issue #18 (June 1974), which recruits a reluctant Shang-Chi for an MI6 mission; his early art showed a heavy stylistic debt to Jim Steranko, though reviewers of the period already noted a fast-developing individual style. Englehart left the series after #19, complaining that Stan Lee stipulated "wall-to-wall violence" and was unsupportive of his philosophical interests; he was replaced by Doug Moench. Before leaving, Englehart wrote a story referencing the Kung Fu television series, introducing a character drawn by Gulacy to closely resemble David Carradine's Kwai Chang Caine, with a mustache added to avoid copyright concerns. Gerry Conway was initially slated to succeed Englehart but was replaced by Moench, and Gulacy also stepped away from the book for a stretch during this transition, with Ron Wilson and Al Milgrom filling in on art. One retrospective account of Marvel's output in this period judged that Englehart and Starlin, despite establishing the strip's basic premise and cast, never fully settled on a "unifying theme" for the book, and that little chemistry developed among Shang-Chi, Nayland Smith, and Dr. Petrie during their brief tenure; by this account, the series only found its footing once Doug Moench took over as writer.

During this period, a quarterly Giant-Size Master of Kung Fu series began publication alongside the monthly title; its third issue (March 1975) introduced the British agent Clive Reston, described in the strip as a relation of both Sherlock Holmes and James Bond, and retconned the character killed in Shang-Chi's origin story as an impostor, restoring the "real" Dr. Petrie as a prisoner of Fu Manchu, at the insistence of the Rohmer estate. Moench and Gulacy first worked together consistently on the monthly title beginning with issue #22 (November 1974). Although the strip occasionally crossed over into the wider Marvel Universe, including team-ups with Spider-Man, the Thing, and an appearance by Doctor Doom, the creative team largely kept Shang-Chi's world self-contained.

The series shifted decisively toward an espionage format beginning with "The Crystal Connection" in issue #29 (June 1975), the first chapter of a multi-part story pitting Shang-Chi and his allies against the drug lord Carlton Velcro and his bladed enforcer, Razor Fist. Moench introduced the espionage angle to avoid repeatedly recycling stories of assassins sent by Fu Manchu, and to draw on Nayland Smith's British-intelligence background from the original Rohmer novels, updating it into a modern context of globe-spanning conspiracy. Both creators cited the James Bond film series as a direct influence. Inker Dan Adkins joined the art team on the arc's second chapter, and the storyline concluded with the destruction of Velcro's island fortress along with a hidden cache of nuclear weapons.

Issue #33 (October 1975) introduced the assassin Mordillo and the character Leiko Wu, an intelligence operative who became Shang-Chi's recurring romantic interest. A following arc introduced the recurring character Shen Kuei, known as Cat, a nuanced antagonist with an ambiguous relationship to Chinese intelligence, whose name evokes the coexistence of positive and negative spirit in Chinese thought; Shang-Chi developed a wary respect for the character over the course of the story. Issue #39 (April 1976) includes a sequence in which Shang-Chi employs two pairs of nunchaku, which critic Douglas Wolk characterizes as "twenty-five years ahead of its time". Beginning with issue #40 (May 1976), Moench and Gulacy introduced James Larner, an alcoholic former agent modeled visually on Marlon Brando, and expanded the strip into a full ensemble drama; they also introduced the recurring villain Shockwave. In response to correspondence, Moench declared in issue #47 (December 1976) that he and Gulacy were inspired by Will Eisner's The Spirit, Jim Steranko's Nick Fury, Agent of S.H.I.E.L.D., and Dennis O'Neil's and Neal Adams' Green Lantern, as well as the work of Ian Fleming; however, they claimed that they had not seen Enter the Dragon or any other film starring Bruce Lee until 1976. In a later interview, Gulacy affirmed that he had begun modelling the character after Lee from the beginning of his run in 1974, the year following the actor's death; but that the creative team was concerned about possible legal action from his estate for employing his likeness.

An extended storyline, largely serialized in issues #45 through #50 (November 1976 – March 1977) and internally titled "The Death Seed", was narrated across successive chapters from the individual points of view of six characters: Shang-Chi, Clive Reston, Leiko Wu, Black Jack Tarr, Nayland Smith, and Fu Manchu. It was a structural device Moench planned in contrast to the more open-ended serialization common among other Marvel titles of the period. Moench described the character's core dramatic tension in this period as a paradox of Shang-Chi being a devoted pacifist who was nonetheless continually forced into violence. Larner was killed off in the arc's climax, a plot point Moench later said had been planned from the character's introduction. It was also the final extended arc completed by Gulacy as the regular artist; he departed the monthly title afterward, citing creative burnout after roughly two years on the book.

Shang-Chi appeared concurrently in the The Deadly Hands of Kung Fu, largely written by Moench and illustrated by Rudy Nebres, including a seven-issue confrontation with Fu Manchu; the character also crossed over with Iron Fist in an October 1976 issue of the monthly title and in the sole Master of Kung Fu Annual.

Following Gulacy's departure, the artist assignment on Master of Kung Fu passed to Jim Craig, whose work struggled by comparison with Gulacy's and who reportedly had difficulty meeting the title's monthly deadlines. Mike Zeck, who had previously worked at Charlton, began filling in on the series in 1977 after Craig missed a deadline and became the regular penciler with issue #67 (August 1978). Gene Day joined the title with issue #76 (May 1979), working alongside Zeck before becoming the sole artist by issue #102 (July 1981); Fu Manchu was seemingly killed off in issue #89 (June 1979), after which Nayland Smith founded a private security and consulting firm, Freelance Restorations, employing the series' regular supporting cast.

==== Unrealized Nick Fury crossover ====
Moench and Gulacy had independently admired artist Jim Steranko's stylized late-1960s run on Nick Fury, Agent of S.H.I.E.L.D. before they began working together, and once Moench steered Master of Kung Fu toward an espionage format, the two developed a full plan to unify the strip's cast with Nick Fury and his agents of S.H.I.E.L.D. against a combined threat from Fu Manchu and villain the Yellow Claw. Gulacy traced the concept partly to an underwater sequence he had drawn in "The Crystal Connection", which led him to want to set a future story mostly underwater; the planned crossover would have placed the Yellow Claw in an underwater fortress in the South China Sea, an idea both creators attributed to the influence of the Bond film Thunderball. The concept was later reworked by Moench and Gulacy for the 1992 Dark Horse series James Bond: Serpent's Tooth. As plotted, Fu Manchu and the Yellow Claw would have begun the story as uneasy allies who ultimately betrayed one another, with Shang-Chi's group pursuing Fu Manchu and Fury's agents pursuing the Yellow Claw before the two teams converged; the creators also envisioned a comedic pairing between Black Jack Tarr and S.H.I.E.L.D. agent Dum Dum Dugan, and a joint mission for Leiko Wu and Contessa Valentina Allegro de Fontaine.

Moench recalled receiving editorial approval for the crossover, likely from Roy Thomas or his successor as the title's editor, Len Wein, though such stories required specific sign-off because of scheduling conflicts across multiple ongoing series that might want to use the same guest characters. A "next issue" caption in Giant-Size Master of Kung Fu #2 had teased an appearance by the Yellow Claw, and a subsequent letters-page response explained that Fury was being rested after appearances in three other Marvel titles. Moench recalled that Marvel ultimately delayed the project by roughly six months, after which the creative team's attention moved to other storylines and Gulacy's eventual burnout and departure from the monthly book effectively ended any prospect of completing it.

Gulacy, a longtime friend of inker Dan Adkins, who had previously worked with Steranko, recalled reaching out to Steranko about inking the crossover; both creators recalled Steranko expressing enthusiasm without fully committing to the project. No pages of the crossover were ever drawn, and published Gulacy artwork depicting Nick Fury is rare, limited to a handful of pinup illustrations, including one published in the 1974 fanzine Contemporary Pictorial Literature and a 1982 plate produced for a Black Widow portfolio. Gulacy later reflected that the unrealized project would have been "pretty awesome".

=== 1980s and 1990s ===
Beginning with issue #103 (August 1981), Gene Day became the new penciler of the series. In issue #118, Shang-Chi resolves his conflict with his father Fu Manchu and recognizes Sir Denis Nayland Smith as his spiritual paternal figure. Jim Shooter, an editor at Marvel, told the writer and artist to simplify the series and to make radical changes; Moench and Day quit the series as a result. The series lasted five remaining issues, with writing by Alan Zelenetz and art by Mike Mignola, concluding with issue #125 (June 1983). In the final issue, Shang Chi leaves his life and friends behind and becomes a fisherman. Marvel editors considered killing the character off.

Written by Moench, the character appeared in a storyline in the first eight issues of the comics anthology series Marvel Comics Presents in 1988. Shang-Chi also appeared in the 1990 one-shot issue Master of Kung Fu: Bleeding Black. In 1995, a revival of Shang-Chi was proposed to Milestone Media; according to writer Dwayne McDuffie, the title would depict Shang-Chi using firearms, inspired by gun fu style by Hong Kong filmmaker John Woo. However, the proposal was cancelled after the departure of editor-in-chief Tom DeFalco and the death of Mark Gruenwald the following year. In 1997, a story arc starring Shang-Chi ran in Journey into Mystery #514–516, and was intended to lead into a miniseries for the character in 1998.

=== 2000s and 2010s ===
Moench and Gulacy reunited for a Master of Kung Fu miniseries from 2002 to 2003, for the MAX imprint. The supporting cast characters derived from Sax Rohmer were eliminated or transformed in later Shang-Chi stories. When Shang-Chi appeared in a storyline in Reginald Hudlin's Black Panther in 2006, a character who appears to be Fu Manchu reappears, sharing the name of the villain from Enter the Dragon. Shang-Chi returned as a main character in the 2007 Heroes for Hire comic book. In 2009, the black and white one-shot Shang-Chi: Master of Kung Fu was released, with stories written by Jonathan Hickman, Mike Benson, Charlie Huston, and Robin Furth and illustrated by Tomm Coker, C.P. Smith, Enrique Romero, and Paul Gulacy.

In Secret Avengers #6–10 (December 2010-April 2011), writer Ed Brubaker's storyline depicts the Shadow Council resurrecting a zombified version of Fu Manchu, only to discover that this name was an alias and that Shang-Chi's father's real name was Zheng Zu, an ancient Chinese sorcerer who discovered the secret to immortality. In 2011, Shang-Chi appeared in a crossover with Spider-Man, published in Free Comic Book Day: The Amazing Spider-Man and Spider Island: Deadly Hands of Kung Fu, in which Shang-Chi trains Spider-Man to create a new martial art, the Way of the Spider. Shang-Chi's half sister Fah Lo Suee was renamed Zheng Bao Yu in 2013's The Fearless Defenders #8, written by Cullen Bunn. In writer Jonathan Hickman's run on The Avengers during the Marvel Now! relaunch, Shang-Chi joins the Avengers. In 2014, the miniseries Deadly Hands of Kung Fu was released with Shang-Chi in appearance, written by Mike Benson and illustrated by Tan Eng Huat. In this story, Shang-Chi's brother Midnight kills Leiko Wu.

The following year, Shang-Chi starred in the Master of Kung Fu revival in the Secret Wars storyline. Written by Haden Blackman and illustrated by Taljic, the four-issue series is a wuxia-inspired story that takes place in the Battleworld domain of K'un-L'un and centered around Shang-Chi in his fight to overthrow his despotic father, Emperor Zheng Zu. In 2017, after a 34-year gap, Shang-Chi once again starred in Master of Kung Fu's 126th issue as part of the Marvel Legacy relaunch, written by mixed martial artist CM Punk and illustrated by Dalibor Talajić. That same year, Marvel also partnered with the Chinese media company NetEase to expand its audience in East Asia; Shang-Chi appeared as the instructor of a new Chinese superhero, Lin Lie, in the affiliated series Sword Master, written by Greg Pak. In 2018, Shang-Chi also appeared in Domino, as the titular character's instructor.

=== 2020s ===
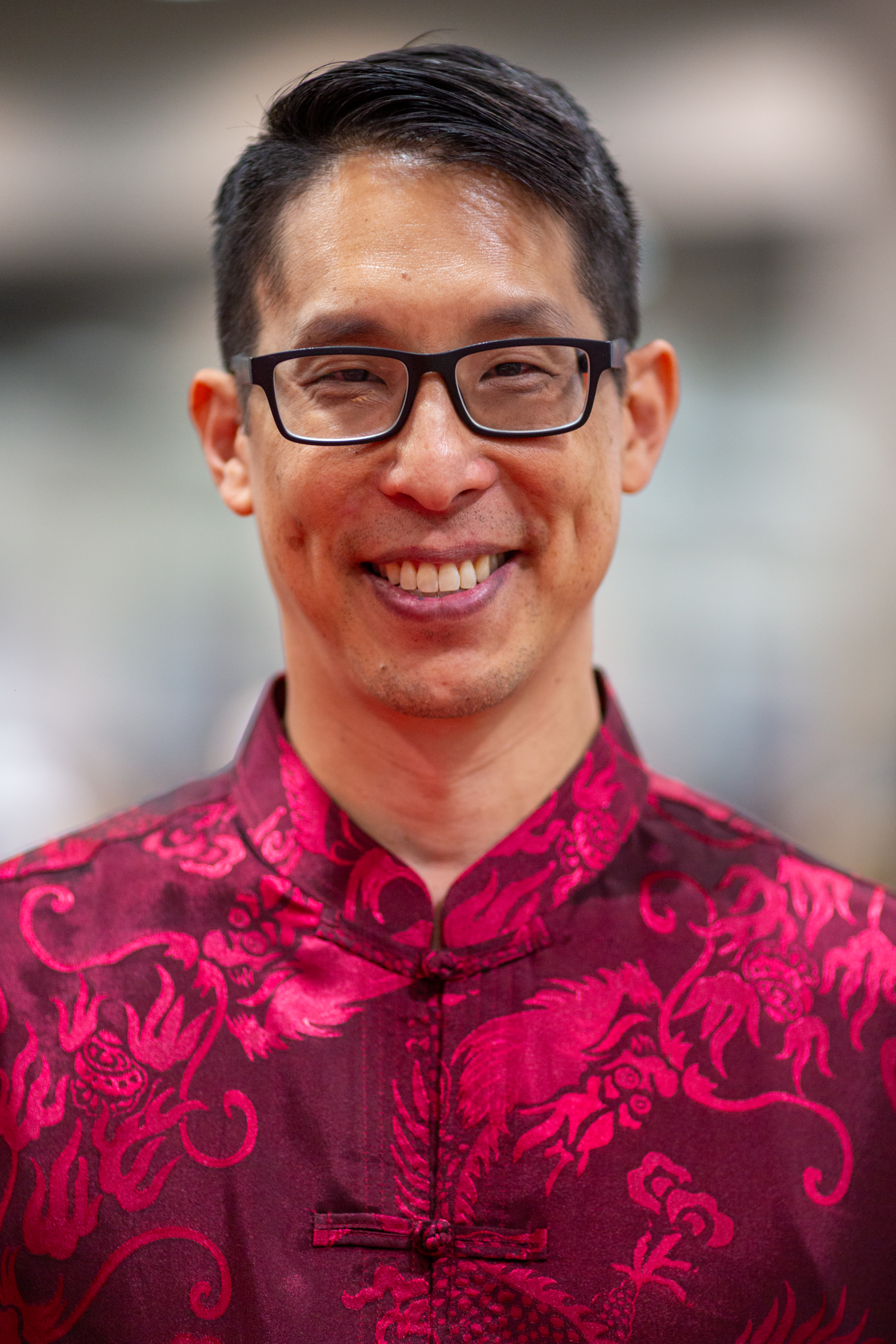
American Born Chinese author Gene Luen Yang wrote a new Shang-Chi series in the 2020s.

In 2020, Shang-Chi starred in a self-titled five-issue miniseries written by American Born Chinese author Gene Luen Yang with art by Dike Ruan and Philip Tan. Initially set for a June 2020 release, the first issue was delayed to September due to the COVID-19 pandemic. Shang-Chi starred in a new ongoing series by Yang and Ruan in 2021, with Marcus To replacing Ruan by the 9th issue. Following the release of the 2021 Marvel Cinematic Universe film Shang-Chi and the Legend of the Ten Rings, Yang incorporated several concepts introduced in the film into the comics, including the character Jiang Li as Shang-Chi's real mother, who was based on Shang-Chi's mother Ying Li, (Note: The character's name in the film was initially announced as Jiang Li, even used on licensed products, however, it was changed to Ying Li.) retconning Shang-Chi's white American mother and his mixed-race heritage; the heavenly realm Ta-Lo, which was previously introduced by writers Mark Gruenwald, Ralph Macchio and artist Keith Pollard in Thor #310 (1980); and the Ten Rings weapons.

In March 2021, the one-shot The Legend of Shang-Chi was published, written by Alyssa Wong and art by Andie Tong. Six months later, Shang-Chi starred in a miniseries made available by the Marvel Unlimited app, the miniseries was written by Alyssa Wong and illustrated by Nathan Stockman. In July 2022, the ongoing Shang-Chi series was succeeded by a new ongoing series titled Shang-Chi and the Ten Rings, with the previously solicited Shang-Chi #13 being retitled Shang-Chi and the Ten Rings #1. Yang's 24-issue run concluded with the one-shot Shang-Chi: Master of the Ten Rings, with Michael YG replacing To on art, in January 2023. In October, he starred in the graphic novel Shang-Chi and the Quest for Immortality, which was written and illustrated by Victoria Ying and colored by Ian Herring. In December 2023, Shang-Chi starred in a Deadly Hands of Kung Fu revival titled Deadly Hands of Kung Fu: Gang War, a three issue miniseries written by Greg Pak and illustrated by Caio Majado which was part of the Gang War crossover event. In February 2024, Shang-Chi was added to the team lineup for a new Thunderbolts series, written by Collin Kelly and Jackson Lanzing and illustrated by Geraldo Borges. Lanzing explained that Shang-Chi's inclusion to the title was due to the character's spy thriller roots from the Master of Kung Fu series. In September 2024, Shang-Chi was featured as a main character in the limited series Avengers Assemble, which was written by Steve Orlando and drawn by Cory Smith. In May 2025, it was announced that there would be a new version of Shang-Chi in the new Ultimate Universe.

== Characterization ==
=== Fictional character biography ===
Shang-Chi on the textless cover of Master of Kung Fu #126 (January 2018), art by Mike Mayhew

Shang-Chi was born and raised in Hunan, China, and is the son of Zheng Zu, who also adopts the identity of Fu Manchu. Shang-Chi was trained from infancy in the martial arts by his father and his tutors; he initially believed that his father was a benevolent humanitarian.

Shang-Chi is sent on a mission to London, England, to murder Dr. James Petrie, who his father claims is a threat to peace. After assassinating Petrie, Shang-Chi encounters Manchu's archenemy Sir Denis Nayland Smith, who tells Shang-Chi his father's true nature. Shang-Chi turns against his father. Shang-Chi subsequently fights his adoptive brother Midnight, who was sent by their father to kill Shang-Chi for his defection, and then encounters MI6 agent Black Jack Tarr, sent by Smith to apprehend Shang-Chi. After several encounters, Shang-Chi becomes an ally of Nayland Smith and MI6. Together with Nayland Smith, Tarr, and fellow MI6 agents Clive Reston, Leiko Wu (his eventual love interest), and Dr. Petrie (revealed to be alive), Shang-Chi goes on many adventures and missions, often thwarting his father's plans for world domination. Shang-Chi occasionally encounters his half-sister Fah Lo Suee, who leads her own faction of the Five Weapons Society. With Smith, Tarr, Reston, Wu, and Petrie, Shang-Chi forms Freelance Restorations, Ltd., an independent spy agency based in Stormhaven Castle, Scotland. After many skirmishes and battles, Shang-Chi witnesses the death of Fu Manchu; a guilt-ridden Shang-Chi quits Freelance Restorations, severs all ties with his former allies, forsakes his life as an adventurer, and retires to a remote village in Yang-Tin, China, to live as a fisherman.

Some time later, Shang-Chi returns from China and rejoins Reston and Wu. After collaborating with British Intelligence, Fah Lo Suee secretly heads a narcotics empire, though Shang-Chi never discovers his half-sister's involvement. Now known as Comte de Saint Germain, or Ghost, Fu Manchu retakes control of his criminal organization. Shang-Chi rejoins MI6, working against his father.

Shang-Chi joins Heroes for Hire. He temporarily mutates into a spider, but is cured by Iron Fist. Steve Rogers tracks down Shang-Chi to help turn back the Shadow Council, which has partially resurrected Shang-Chi's father; Beast reveals to Shang-Chi and the Secret Avengers that Fu Manchu is an ancient sorcerer named Zheng Zu. The Avengers prevent Zheng Zu from sacrificing Shang-Chi to complete his resurrection; Zheng Zhu appears to have been killed during the rescue. Shang-Chi subsequently joins the Secret Avengers for a period. Shang-Chi trains Spider-Man in kung fu to compensate for the loss of his spider-sense, which has become overloaded. Shang-Chi joins the Avengers; they fight various cosmic foes. Shang-Chi is sent to Madripoor along with other Avengers; when Gorgon lifts the island on the head of a massive dragon, Shang-Chi uses Pym Particles to grow to the size of a giant to defeat Gorgon and the dragon. Shang-Chi is exposed to cosmic-level radiation that gives him the ability to clone himself.

Shang-Chi joins several Asian American superheroes for a fundraiser in New York; they are ambushed by the alien Prince Regent Phalkan and his army from Seknarf Seven. Shang-Chi and his allies are then teleported near Seknarf Seven. Dubbing their group "The Protectors", Jimmy Woo rallies the group to escape. Domino approaches Shang-Chi for training, and the two spend a romantic night out in Hong Kong, only to be ambushed at a night club by a large group of Shang-Chi's enemies led by Midnight Sun. Domino and Shang-Chi defeat them, but the two are eventually confronted by Topaz, who Domino defeats using Shang-Chi's teachings. Despite Shang-Chi's pleas for mercy, Domino kills Topaz. Disappointed, Shang-Chi breaks up with Domino and dismisses her as his student.

After taking part in a demonstration for Jimmy Woo's Pan-Asian School for the Unusually Gifted in Mumbai, Shang-Chi and the Protectors are offered membership to Woo's Agents of Atlas. Shang-Chi encounters the Sword Master, Lin Lie, who is searching for his missing father; Shang takes Lin Lie under his wing to improve his skills. The two discover that multiple cities have been connected together with portals by tech mogul Mike Nguyen of the Big Nguyen Company. Shang-Chi and the Sword Master are confronted by Ares, who attempts to take Lin Lie's Fuxi sword. In exchange for Shang-Chi and the Sword Master helping him, Ares offers to help find Lin Lie's missing father. They work together to find Ares' drakon son Ismenios. Amadeus later approaches Shang-Chi and tasks him with locating Jimmy Woo, who has not contacted the team since Pan's creation. Shang-Chi infiltrates Woo's office in the Pan-Asian School for the Unusually Gifted and discovers a secret tunnel in Woo's office that takes them to the Atlas Foundation's headquarters, where they confront Woo and the Atlas Foundation's dragon adviser Mr. Lao. They enter into conflict with Namor, who views Ismenios as a dragon stolen from him; this kickstarts a war between Pan and Atlantis.

Yearning for an ordinary life, Shang-Chi relocates to San Francisco's Chinatown but crosses paths with Leiko Wu. They meet Brother Sabre and Sister Dagger, who reveal themselves to be Shang-Chi's half-siblings, and tell Shang-Chi that he has been chosen by Zheng Zu's spirit as the next Supreme Commander of the Five Weapons Society, a secret organization created by their father centuries ago. Sabre and Dagger ask their half-brother to return to their family and reclaim his rightful place as leader of the Society from its illegitimate leader Sister Hammer, who usurped control from the previous commander. Realizing that Hammer is his long-lost sister, Shi-Hua, Shang-Chi vows to save her from his father's cult. Shang-Chi reunites with Shi-Hua, who explains to Shang-Chi the history of the Five Weapons Society. Shang-Chi recounts the truth of their father's nature and attempts to convince Shi-Hua to leave the Society. Mistakenly believing that Shang-Chi murdered Zheng Zu, Shi-Hua is outraged that their father's spirit would choose Shang-Chi over her to succeed him and tries to kill him. She poisons him, but instead of dying, Shang-Chi awakens in the House's laboratory, where scientists unleash jiangshi to kill him. Shang-Chi is grievously wounded by a jiangshi and, before losing consciousness, he is rescued by Sabre and Dagger. While recuperating, Shang-Chi is provided with a new ceremonial uniform and prepares to fight Shi-Hua's jiangshi, which are powered by spirit energy. Shang-Chi's wound begins to turn him into a jiangshi. Shang-Chi meets the spirit of Zheng Yi, Zheng Zu's brother. Shang-Chi and his siblings are directed to Yi's tomb in Henan; Shang-Chi requests Yi's guidance in stopping Shi-Hua, and to heal the wound inflicted by the jiangshi. Yi's spirit tells Shang-Chi to stop running away from his family, and reveals that Zu did not steal his life essence for immortality, but that he willingly gave it when Zu tried to save him from dying. Shang-Chi begins to succumb to his wound and partially transforms into a jiangshi, allowing Shi-Hua to control his body. Shang-Chi calms himself, which transports the two to an astral plane where they witness memories of Shi-Hua's harsh upbringing by their father. Realizing that her anger is at Zheng Zu rather than Shang-Chi, Shi-Hua stops her assault, causing the jiangshi to collapse and Shang-Chi's wounds to heal. However, Shi-Hua blames Shang-Chi for robbing her of her life's purpose and flees. Shang-Chi is named the new Supreme Commander of the Five Weapons Society and vows to keep the Society free of Zheng Zu's influence and to use it to protect all humankind. After the ceremony, Shang-Chi is visited by Zheng Zu's spirit, who comments that he is destined to become like him, unsettling Shang-Chi.

Shang-Chi breaks into the Baxter Building to enter the Negative Zone to rescue his mother, Jiang Li, who had been previously trapped in the Negative Zone for years. He discovered that she was from a mystical world called Ta-Lo. Shang-Chi travelled to Ta-Lo to obtain the Ten Rings, which gave him magical powers.

=== Personality and motivations ===
"What's compelling about Shang-Chi is less how he fights than how he thinks: he's introverted and self-questioning, perpetually looking for patterns in his personal history, and not always finding even the ones that are there."

— Douglas Wolk, All of the Marvels: A Journey to the Ends of the Biggest Story Ever Told

Writer Doug Moench built the character around a paradox: Shang-Chi was raised as a committed pacifist, yet the demands of an ongoing adventure series continually forced him into violence, a tension Moench considered essential to the character. The strip dramatized this paradox directly in Shang-Chi's own narration captions. Agreeing for the first time to work with Nayland Smith, he privately wonders whether there might be "a path in the middle ... without becoming dirty", and he later comes to describe the world of espionage itself, in a phrase that recurs throughout Moench's run, as Smith's "games of deceit and death". That tension was inseparable from Shang-Chi's relationship with his father. Trained since childhood to revere Fu Manchu, Shang-Chi discovers only as an adult that the man he idolized is a mass murderer; Moench likened the emotional force of that discovery to learning that a beloved parent was in reality Charles Manson. The series repeatedly returned to Shang-Chi's fear of becoming like his father. A related thread ran through Fu Manchu's own methods, which frequently involved brainwashing his followers into obedient, remote-controlled operatives; one analysis of the series argues that Shang-Chi's horror at this fate, and his recurring worry that he might be acting as an unthinking instrument himself whenever he suppressed his own conscience to complete a mission, positioned free will, and self-possession as the qualities that most separated him from his father's world.

This underlying discomfort with violence and manipulation recurred as a behavioral pattern rather than a single episode. Shang-Chi has repeatedly withdrawn from active heroics after acts he considered a betrayal of his own principles, retiring at different points to a remote fishing village and to a private island, only to be drawn back into conflict by old allies. The same instinct carried into his later work as a hand-to-hand combat instructor to other heroes, a role consistent with a fighter more inclined to teach restraint than to use force himself; when one of his students, the mercenary Domino, killed an opponent during a mission, Shang-Chi ended both his mentorship and his romantic relationship with her rather than accept the killing as a legitimate use of what he had taught her.

=== Powers and abilities ===
According to Marvel, "Shang-Chi is the greatest living master of kung fu"; traditionally, he has no superhuman powers, but his extraordinary physical and mental discipline allow him to overcome superhuman adversaries. Shang-Chi employs hand-to-hand combat as well as traditional East-Asian martial arts weapons, such as nunchaku. During his time with the Avengers, Shang-Chi was given special equipment by Tony Stark. This included a pair of gauntlets that allowed him to focus his chi in ways that increased his strength and a pair of repulsor-powered nunchaku.

While adventuring in Ta-Lo, Shang-Chi acquired the Ten Rings from the Jade Emperor, granting him a variety of powers and abilities, including superhuman strength, speed, durability, and stamina, as well as allowing him to fly and levitate. The Ten Rings are introduced in a 2022 storyline, described as a weapon capable of rivaling the Infinity Stones in power. In the story, Shang-Chi's estranged relatives gather under his grandfather, the ruler of Ta-Lo, threatening his family; to protect them, Shang-Chi is compelled to inherit the rings his late father had wished him to wield, a power explicitly tied in Marvel's own framing to "his dark side". The storyline presents the rings as both an inheritance and a temptation, warning that claiming them would affect Shang-Chi's standing across the wider Marvel Universe and further strain his already uneasy relationship with the Avengers. A subsequent "Game of Rings" storyline traced the artifact's fictional history to a period before recorded history, depicting the corruption of the mythic figure Nezha by a spirit he had trapped inside a weapon called the Universe Ring, which later fractured into the pieces that became the Ten Rings.

The Ten Rings had long predated Shang-Chi's possession of them; they were traditionally associated with the villain The Mandarin, and were depicted as literal finger rings that resize automatically to fit the wearer, each conferring a different power. Established lore treats the rings as vessels for the souls of deceased Makluan heroes, brought to Earth by an alien explorer whom the Mandarin allowed to die in order to claim them, with the trapped souls subsequently corrupting him toward world conquest.

== Themes and motifs ==
Since the story arc "The Crystal Connection", Moench and Gulacy moved the series decisively toward the structure and tone of Cold War era spy fiction. Moench introduced the shift partly to avoid recycling stories in which assassins were dispatched by Fu Manchu to kill his own son, and drew on Sir Denis Nayland Smith's British-intelligence background from the original Rohmer novels, updating it into a modern, globe-spanning conception of espionage. Both creators cited the James Bond film series, and in Moench's case, Ian Fleming's novels, as direct influences; Moench felt Shang-Chi himself could not convincingly be written as a Bond figure, but that supporting characters such as Clive Reston and Black Jack Tarr could serve as off-beat versions of Bond, letting the series draw on the genre without becoming a straightforward imitation of it. This shift was as much visual as narrative. Gulacy's redesign of the strip drew directly on Jim Steranko's earlier, stylized run on Nick Fury, Agent of S.H.I.E.L.D., and on the poster art of contemporary spy and martial-arts films, including work by artists such as Robert McGinnis, Frank McCarthy, and Bob Peak.

== Supporting characters ==
=== Allies ===
In early stories, Shang-Chi often works together with MI6 agents, in particular Sir Denis Nayland Smith, Black Jack Tarr, and Clive Reston. After Fu Manchu's apparent death, Smith formalized the group's arrangement by founding the private security firm Freelance Restorations, which continued to employ them on further missions. Outside this unit, Shang-Chi's martial arts skills also brought him into recurring contact with Marvel's other prominent street-level heroes, particularly Iron Fist, alongside whom he later joined a revived incarnation of Heroes for Hire.

In later stories, he frequently works with various teams of superheroes. Shang-Chi was recruited by Captain America into a covert team called the Secret Avengers to stop the Shadow Council, a group of mercenaries and businessmen who sought to resurrect Shang-Chi's father using his son's own life force; Shang-Chi was aided in the resulting conflict by the martial artist known as the Prince of Orphans and by Moon Knight, who had infiltrated the Council undercover. He became a recurring member of Jimmy Woo's Agents of Atlas and its successor team, the New Agents of Atlas, alongside heroes including Kamala Khan, Silk, Amadeus Cho, White Fox, Wave, Aero, Luna Snow, Crescent, Io, and S.H.I.E.L.D. agent Jake Oh. Writer Greg Pak described Shang-Chi within this ensemble as its oldest and most disciplined member, and, unlike his technologically or superpowered teammates, one whose unaugmented fighting skill could prove decisive under the right circumstances. During his time with the Agents of Atlas, Shang-Chi also mentored the teenage hero Sword Master. Shang-Chi additionally worked in later stories alongside Misty Knight and Colleen Wing as part of a later incarnation of Freelance Restorations, and became an official Avenger after being recruited by Iron Man and Captain America. He served as a hand-to-hand combat instructor to several other heroes over the years, including Spider-Man, Wolverine, Captain America, and Domino, several of whom separately sought him out for sparring instruction.

=== Romantic interests ===
"[Leiko Wu] gave him love, which may sound cliche, but is really all you need, as John Lennon said. That was the greatest thing. Caring about someone else probably does more for spirit than anything else could. Him caring about Leiko was a way to advance his own spirit."

— Doug Moench, Back Issue! #26

Leiko Wu, an intelligence operative introduced during the Moench–Gulacy run, became Shang-Chi's most significant recurring romantic partner. Moench considered the relationship central to the character's emotional development, describing the bond as an extension of the openness and affection Shang-Chi extended toward everyone and everything around him. Later stories paired the character with other partners. During a 2000s run of Heroes for Hire, he had a brief relationship with teammate Tarantula. He later served as a combat instructor to Domino; the two became romantically involved following her training, but Shang-Chi ended both the relationship and his mentorship of her after she killed an opponent in a manner he considered an unacceptable line to cross. In a 2020s relaunch of the character, Shang-Chi began a relationship with Delilah Wang, a lawyer and the granddaughter of the woman who had once employed him at her bakery in San Francisco.

=== Family and the Five Weapons Society ===
Stories published since 2020 substantially expanded Shang-Chi's family history through the Five Weapons Society, a secret organization said to have been founded in mid-18th century China by the sorcerer Zheng Yi and his brother, Zheng Zu, identified in these stories as Shang-Chi's father, as a group of warriors devoted to protecting the country. Using an immortality ritual, the brothers were said to have sustained the organization across generations by dividing it into five Houses, each led by a designated champion, a structure Zheng Zu devised alone after his brother's apparent murder.

Raised within the Five Weapons Society and originally intended by his father to become its Supreme Commander, Shang-Chi's earlier departure from the organization left his own House, the House of the Deadly Hand, in a weakened position. In his absence, a previously unknown younger sister, Zheng Shi-Hua, known as Sister Hammer, seized control of the Society through intimidation and murder, killing the leader of a rival House to do so; a mystical shrine belonging to Zheng Zu subsequently selected Shang-Chi, rather than his sister, as the new Supreme Commander, setting the two siblings against one another. Sister Hammer drew her power from the Jiangshi, an army of vampiric zombies created by their father, and nearly killed Shang-Chi with them before he was revived through the intervention of their uncle Zheng Yi's spirit. Shang-Chi was aided in the resulting conflict by two more previously unknown half-siblings, Brother Sabre and Sister Dagger, also known by their given names, Takeshi and Esme, who had each been raised in a different House of the Society away from their father's direct influence. Esme in particular remained a loyal ally as Shang-Chi attempted to redirect the Society toward more constructive ends, though his continued use of the organization drew suspicion from other heroes. Shang-Chi later discovered a half-sister, the mutant Zhilan, who had been exiled from the Society by their father years earlier; her reappearance drew the attention of Wolverine, sent to protect her as a fellow mutant, leading to a confrontation with Shang-Chi before the two reconciled. A subsequent storyline revealed that Shang-Chi's own grandfather, ruler of the mystical realm of Ta-Lo, posed a further threat to the family, prompting Shang-Chi to claim the Ten Rings his father had wished him to inherit.

=== Villains ===
Shang-Chi's primary antagonist throughout the Moench–Gulacy era was his father, identified in that period as Fu Manchu, leader of a criminal organization called the Si-Fan. The character reappears in later series, with the new name Zheng Zu. Shang-Chi also comes into conflict with his sister, Fah Lo Suee. Other adversaries introduced during this period included the drug trafficker Carlton Velcro and his bladed enforcer Razor Fist; the assassin Mordillo and his robotic aide Brynocki; and Shockwave, a recurring villain whose martial-arts strikes carried a lethal electric charge.

Later stories introduced villains unconnected to Shang-Chi's family. In a storyline built around a contested Cosmic Cube, Shang-Chi and Captain America confronted Lady Iron Fan, a Macau casino owner who led a criminal syndicate said to rival Hydra and A.I.M. and who commanded an arsenal of psychically controlled fan-shaped weapons; writer Gene Luen Yang said the character was inspired by Princess Iron Fan, a figure from the classical Chinese novel Journey to the West. A separate storyline revealed that the proprietor of a Chinese medicine shop secretly served Zheng Zu; using a mystical plant called the Yeren root, the character transformed into a beast known as King Wild Man and poisoned Spider-Man with the same substance, briefly turning him into a feral, spider-limbed adversary before Shang-Chi was able to calm him.

== Reception and legacy ==
Racial depictions in the comic are controversial, partly because of its origins in Sax Rohmer's Fu Manchu stories, which are often considered racist. The character appears in the initial Shang-Chi: Master of Kung Fu series, and his illustration and characterization has also been described as racist and emblematic of the stereotypical Yellow Peril. In addition, Fu Manchu's daughter, Fah Lo Suee, who also appears in the early Shang-Chi stories, is often considered an archetypal example of the Dragon Lady stereotype. Douglas Wolk points out inaccuracies and insensitivities in Shang-Chi's depiction; he wears a karate gi despite practicing kung fu, and he is colored "a bizarre pumpkin-orange shade" in the first decades of his appearance. Eliot Borenstein also notes the character's orange skin tone, comparable to that of the Fantastic Four's Ben Grimm, that a recurring antagonist was colored an equally unnatural yellow, and that Black Jack Tarr referred to Shang-Chi by a racial epithet for years despite repeated objections raised in the Master of Kung Fu letters column. Notably, this unnatural orange or golden coloration persisted for decades. It was only in 1991, in Captain America #412 (under editor Mark Gruenwald), that Shang-Chi was first drawn with a normal, natural skin tone, finally shedding the bizarre coloring that had plagued the character since his inception. According to Starlin, his friend Larry Hama, who is of Japanese descent, told him about the racist nature of the Fu Manchu stories and showed him an old issue of the comics. Upon reading it, Starlin decided to abandon the series after just three issues.

Furthermore, the original comics featured various Orientalist clichés: the hero was portrayed speaking in "fortune-cookie platitudes", (like Charlie Chan) reducing his complexity to stock phrases; there was confusion between Chinese and Japanese cultures—such as using the Japanese term sensei instead of the Chinese term shifu to refer to masters in China; and the artwork employed stereotypical fonts, such as the Wonton font, as well as anachronistic elements like rickshaws and nonsensical Chinese words. The Si-Fan, Fu Manchu's organization in the books, was portrayed as ninjas, even though ninjas are originally Japanese, not Chinese.

However, Asian American writer and cartoonist Gene Luen Yang argues that Shang-Chi and other comics characters inspired by martial arts films carried with them "a particular set of stereotypes", but that this was a major improvement in representation for superhero comics, because Shang-Chi and similar characters are heroic and "portrayed as three-dimensional human beings with relatable desires, fears, and flaws". In the letters column of the series, fans often challenged racial caricatures appearing in the series and debated with writer Doug Moench. In particular, Chinese-American author William F. Wu wrote to Moench frequently and had his viewpoints published in the letter's page. Wu commended the series despite his limitations, later saying that "Doug Moench managed levels of characterization and plot that many other comics writers didn't reach." Other authors and comics writers who wrote to the letters column include Harry Cleaver, Catherine Yronwode, Dean Mullaney, Kim Thompson, Robert Rodi, Peter B. Gillis, and Mike Baron. Acclaimed film director Quentin Tarantino described Shang-Chi: Master of Kung Fu as "my favourite comic book in the mid-1970s when it came out".

When conceiving the name "Shang-Chi", Steve Englehart based it on the I-Ching, intending it to mean "ascending and advancing spirit", but the choice reflects a superficial appropriation of Chinese culture, lacking proper linguistic knowledge. Shang-Chi's name has been criticized as stilted and artificial by Chinese speakers, although some have suggested homophonous corrections: In 2019, American actor Ronny Chieng, of Malaysian Chinese descent, opined that Marvel should not use 上氣 (Shàngqì) as the characters for Shang-Chi, as it literally means "upper air" and seemed strange to Chieng. He proposed 神奇 (pinyin: Shénqí; Wade–Giles: Shen^{2}-ch'i^{2}; lit. 'magical / wonderful') instead, or 昇華的靈氣 (Chinese: 升华的灵气; pinyin: Shēnghuá de língqì; Wade–Giles: Sheng^{1}-hua^{2} te ling^{2}-ch'i^{4}) to preserve Englehart's original intent. In The Ultimates #15, the Ultimate Universe version of Shang-Chi is called Shen Qi, which translates as miraculous.

Scholars have examined the series for how it portrays Chinese diasporic masculinity; Jachinson Chan writes that "Shang-Chi becomes the quintessential Chinese immigrant hero who simultaneously fights for the West, severs his relationship with his Chinese father, and then returns to China when the job is done." Mariano Turzi argued that admirers of China's rise have effectively cast the country in the same role Shang-Chi occupies in the comics, concluding that "Beijing sees itself more as Shang-Chi" than as the villainous father from whom the hero descends.

== In other media ==
According to Margaret Loesch, former president and CEO of Marvel Productions, in the 1980s, Stan Lee considered Brandon Lee for the role of Shang-Chi and met with the actor and his mother Linda Lee to discuss a potential movie or television series starring the character. In 2001, Stephen Norrington announced his intentions to direct a Shang-Chi film entitled The Hands of Shang-Chi. By 2003, the film was in development at DreamWorks Pictures with Yuen Woo-Ping replacing Norrington as director and Bruce C. McKenna hired to write the screenplay. Ang Lee joined the project as a producer in 2004, but the film did not materialize after that point and the rights to the character reverted to Marvel. In 2006, Shang-Chi was chosen as one of the many properties in Marvel Studios' new film deal with Paramount Pictures.

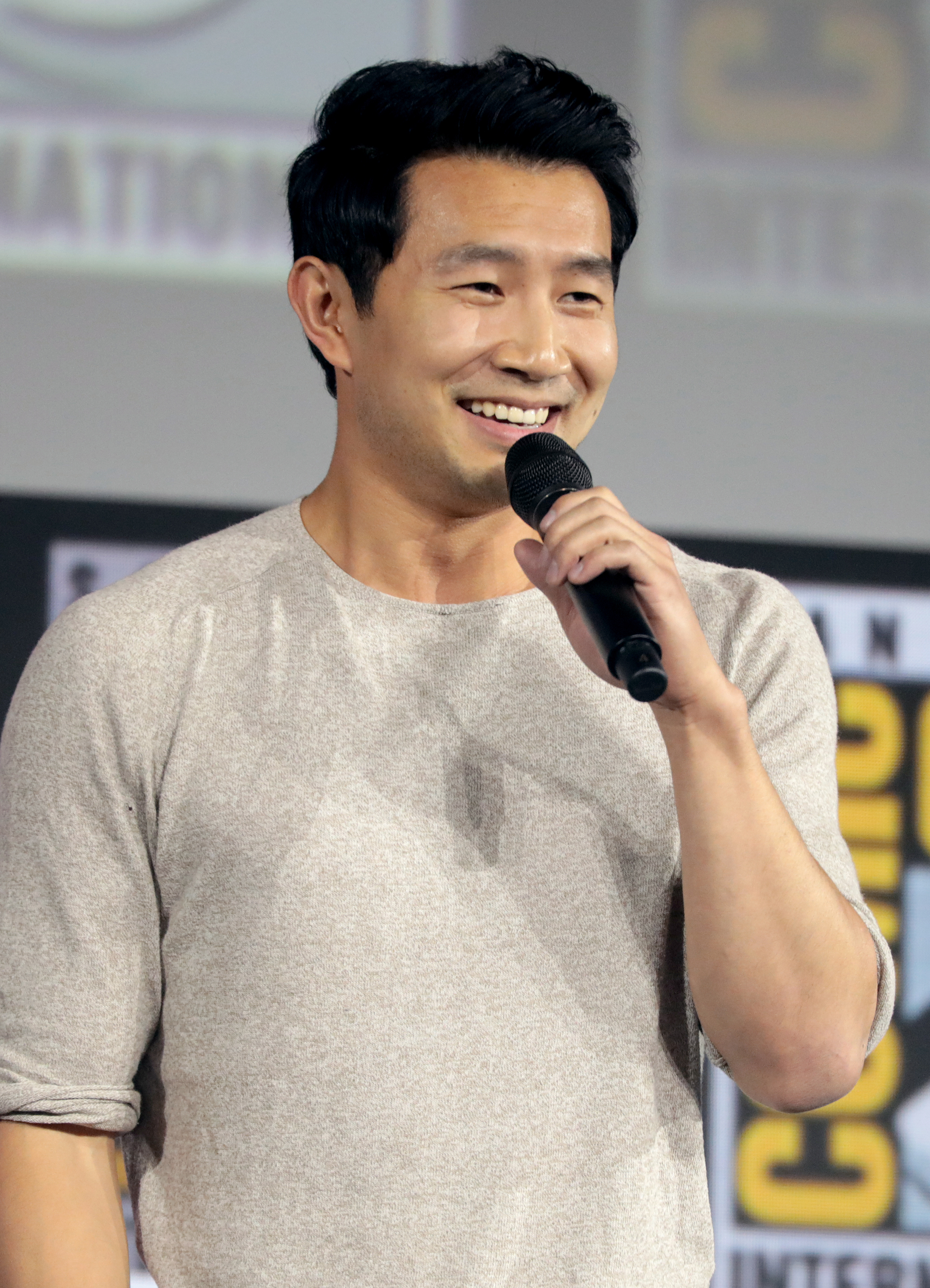
Simu Liu, who portrays Shang-Chi in the Marvel Cinematic Universe, at the 2019 San Diego Comic-Con

Xu Shang-Chi appears in media set in the Marvel Cinematic Universe (MCU), portrayed by Simu Liu. Shang-Chi first appears in the live-action film Shang-Chi and the Legend of the Ten Rings. Alternate universe variants of Shang-Chi appear in the animated series What If...?. An alternate universe variant of Shang-Chi appears in the animated series Marvel Zombies. Shang-Chi will appear in the live-action film Avengers: Doomsday (2026).

Shang-Chi was adapted into books for children, including a Little Golden Book written by Michael Chen and Shang-Chi and the Legend of the Ten Rings: Who Guards My Sleep by Marie Chow.

Shang-Chi also appears in a number of video games, including Marvel Duel, Marvel Contest of Champions, Marvel Strike Force, Marvel Puzzle Quest, and Fortnite Battle Royale.

The character also appears in Magic: The Gathering's Marvel Super-Heroes set (2026).
