= Maximus Lobo =

Publication information
- Publisher: Marvel Comics
- First appearance: The Uncanny X-Men #417 (March 2003)
- Created by: Chuck Austen; Kia Asamiya

In-story information
- Alter ego: Maximus Lobo
- Species: Mutant
- Team affiliations: Dominant Species
- Abilities: Lupine form, enhanced senses.

Maximus Lobo is a fictional character, a mutant appearing in American comic books published by Marvel Comics. He first appeared in The Uncanny X-Men #417 (March 2003), and was created by Chuck Austen and Kia Asamiya.

== Fictional character biography ==
Maximus Lobo is part of the Dominant Species, a group of mutants with wolf-like abilities akin to werewolves. He runs the company Lobo Technologies, a subsidiary of Worthington Enterprises owned by X-Men member Warren Worthington III (Archangel).

In White Plains, New York, the headquarters of Lobo Technologies, Lobo and the Dominant Species kill a small group of humans. When a team of X-Men arrive to investigate the murder, Lobo and the Dominant Species confront the X-Men and force them to retreat. Lobo pursues Archangel and Husk, who learn of his plan to illegally sell Stark Enterprises products. When the rest of the X-Men arrive to help Archangel and Husk, Lobo causes an explosion to cover his escape.

During the "Dark Reign" storyline, Lobo is revealed to have lost his mutant powers during M-Day. Following the events of "X-Men: Messiah Complex", Maximus is confronted by Wolf Cub, who he previously attempted to manipulate into joining his cause.

== Powers and abilities ==
Maximus Lobo is a mutant who is able to assume a werewolf-like form with superhuman strength, speed, agility, stamina, reflexes, senses, and powerful claws and fangs. He claimed that his bones had evolved to be naturally stronger than adamantium.
