= Master of Kung Fu (comics) =

1974–1983 Marvel Comics title

- Cover of Master of Kung Fu #16

Publication information
- Publisher: Marvel Comics
- Schedule: Varied
- Format: Ongoing series
- Genre: Superhero
- Publication date: April 1974 – June 1983
- No. of issues: (vol. 1): 114 (#17–125, four Giant-Size issues, one Annual) (vol. 2): 1 (#126)
- Main character: Shang-Chi

Master of Kung Fu is a comic book title published by Marvel Comics from 1974 to 1983.

== Publication history ==
The character Shang-Chi first appeared in Special Marvel Edition #15 (December 1973) by Steve Englehart and Jim Starlin. Shang-Chi appeared again in issue #16, and with issue #17 (April 1974) the title was changed to The Hands of Shang-Chi, Master of Kung Fu. Amidst the martial arts craze in the United States in the 1970s, the book became very popular, surviving until issue #125 (June 1983), a run including four Giant-Size issues and one Annual.

The series began by introducing Shang-Chi as a man raised by his father Dr. Fu Manchu to be the ultimate assassin for the would-be world conqueror. In Shang-Chi's first mission, he kills one of his father's old enemies, Dr. Petrie and then learns of Manchu's true, evil nature. Disillusioned, Shang-Chi swears eternal opposition to his father's ambitions and fights him as an agent of British intelligence, under the orders of Sir Denis Nayland Smith.

The series was an instant sales success. However, Englehart and Starlin would depart the series after their third issue, Master of Kung Fu #17; Englehart left due to editorial disputes with then-Marvel editor Roy Thomas, while Starlin, who was unfamiliar with Fu Manchu up until working on the second issue of the series, left out of embarrassment over the racist nature of Sax Rohmer's novels. Despite the title's co-creators' early departure, its success grew once writer Doug Moench and artist Paul Gulacy began collaborating in issue #22. Comics historian Les Daniels observed that "ingenious writing by Doug Moench and energetic art by Paul Gulacy brought Master of Kung Fu new life". Their critically acclaimed run continued, with short gaps, until #51 when Gulacy was replaced by artist Jim Craig. Craig was later succeeded by Mike Zeck, who became the regular penciller in issue #66.

Prologue from Master of Kung Fu:

"Call me Shang-Chi, as my father did when he raised me and molded my mind and my body in the vacuum of his Honan, China retreat. I learned many things from my father: That my name means 'The Rising and Advancing of a Spirit', that my body could be forged into a living weapon through the discipline of kung fu, and that it might be used for the murder of a man called Dr. Petrie.

Since then I have learned that my father is Dr. Fu Manchu, the most insidiously evil man on earth...and that to honor him would bring nothing but dishonor to the spirit of my name".

— Shang-Chi, Master of Kung Fu

Gulacy was a film buff, and modeled many characters after film stars: Shang-Chi on Bruce Lee, Juliette on Marlene Dietrich, James Larner on Marlon Brando, Clive Reston (often broadly hinted at as being the son of James Bond, as well as the grand-nephew of Sherlock Holmes) occasionally looking like a combination of Basil Rathbone and Sean Connery, and a minor character, Ward Sarsfield (after Arthur Henry Sarsfield Ward, the real-life name of Fu Manchu's creator Sax Rohmer), resembling David Niven. Moench introduced other film-based characters, including ones modeled after Groucho Marx (Rufus T. Hackstabber) and W. C. Fields (Quigley J. Warmflash).

Moench continued for a long tenure, and the title started to become a fan favorite once again when Mike Zeck (on pencils) and Gene Day (on inks) began their long run on the book. Master of Kung Fu started receiving Gulacy-level acclaim when Gene Day took over penciling in issue #100 (1981). Despite critical success, sales lagged. Day died of a heart attack after finishing issue #120, and Moench left the book after #122. The character's long-running battle with his father ended with #118 and with the main storyline resolved, the book was cancelled with issue #125, as Shang-Chi retired to a passive life as a fisherman in a Chinese village. In 2010, Comics Bulletin ranked Moench's work on Master of Kung-Fu with artists Gulacy, Mike Zeck, and Day sixth on its list of the "Top 10 1970s Marvels".

Since its cancellation, the title would be briefly revived on a couple of occasions. In 1988, Marvel published a new Master of Kung Fu story in Marvel Comics Presents #1-8. It reunited Shang-Chi with most of the original supporting cast and featured Moench again writing, with Tom Grindberg penciling.

The one-shot issue Master of Kung Fu: Bleeding Black (1990), written by Moench, continued Shang-Chi's story from Marvel Comics Presents. The MAX miniseries Master of Kung Fu: Hellfire Apocalypse (2002), featured Paul Gulacy on art again.

In 2009, the black and white one-shot Shang-Chi: Master of Kung Fu was released, with stories written by Jonathan Hickman, Mike Benson, Charlie Huston, and Robin Furth and illustrated by Tomm Coker, C. P. Smith, Enrique Romero and Paul Gulacy.

In 2015, the Master of Kung Fu title was revived as part of the Secret Wars storyline. Written by Haden Blackman and illustrated by Dalibor Talajic, the four-issue miniseries is a wuxia-inspired story that takes place in the Battleworld domain of K'un-L'un and centers around Shang-Chi in his fight to overthrow his despotic father, Emperor Zheng Zu.

In November 2017, after a 34-year gap, Master of Kung Fu released its 126th issue as part of the Marvel Legacy relaunch. The one-shot issue (cover-dated January 2018) was written by professional wrestler CM Punk and illustrated once again by Talajic.

== The Hands of Shang-Chi, Master of Kung Fu ==
=== Supporting characters ===
The series, especially as written by Doug Moench was notable for its strong supporting characters. As they evolved, these characters became nearly as integral to the series as Shang-Chi himself:

- Fu Manchu is portrayed in a manner mostly consistent with the Sax Rohmer novels. He is a brilliant and calculating master villain who aspires to rule the world. He is the leader of the Si-Fan, which he later incorporates into the Order of the Golden Dawn, a single organization made up of secret societies and cults from around the world. As the series progresses the character deteriorates, gradually losing his nobler qualities. By the end of the series he is a pathetic figure, reduced to stealing his children's blood to preserve his immortality and greedily lapping up the blood of his son's clone out of desperation. His true identity is later revealed to be Zheng Zu, an ancient Chinese sorcerer. Other notable aliases include: Mr. Han, the Father, the Devil Doctor, Chang Hu, The Ghost, Comte de Saint Germain and Wang Yu-Seng.
- Sir Denis Nayland Smith is Fu Manchu's nemesis from the novels. In the comics, he retains this role, his obsession with the villain often bringing out the dark side of his own character. In his better moments, he becomes a sort of surrogate father to Shang-Chi. Ultimately, he is too caught up in what Shang-Chi calls 'games of deceit and death' and fails in this role. The relationship the two finally form is that of two flawed characters who feel strong friendship in spite of their deep differences.
- Fah Lo Suee is the daughter of Fu Manchu and is the final character from the novels to appear in the comic book. She is a villainess in her own right, though she is not interested in the misguided idealism of Fu Manchu. She is a pragmatist, seeking the best way to power and as such, shifts alliances often. Usually she is an enemy of Shang-Chi and his friends, but sometimes she is an ally. She initially leads her own faction of the Si-Fan against her father, and later becomes leader of Oriental Expeditors and the Golden Daggers. When last seen, she had become a highly ranked official in MI-6. She later resumes her criminal activities, working under the alias the Cursed Lotus. She is currently known as Zheng Bao Yu.
- Black Jack Tarr is Smith's aide-de-camp and a powerful giant of a man with a gruff manner. Though he is initially an enemy of Shang-Chi, the two become close friends over time. He exhibits the most bigoted traits of any character and invariably addresses Shang-Chi as "Chinaman", rather than using his name. It is one of the successes of the series that readers are drawn to feel for Tarr while the writing never turns a blind eye to his politically incorrect attitudes. Over time, Tarr drops his bigoted attitude and his relationship with Shang-Chi evolves into genuine friendship. By the time of The Deadly Hands of Kung Fu (vol. 2), Tarr has become the new director of MI-6.
- Clive Reston is a British spy who resembles a younger and more vulnerable version of James Bond. Where Bond is a successful womanizer and seems unaffected by heavy drinking, Reston struggles with alcoholism and a romantic rivalry with Shang-Chi. The resemblance to Bond is intentional. Reston's dialogue makes it clear that he is both Bond's son and the grand-nephew of Sherlock Holmes. By the time of Wisdom, he is the director of MI6 and has been knighted; he believes MI-13 to be a doomed organisation and that MI6 should handle the "weird happenings", to the extent of keeping things from the rival agency. After this attitude helped lead to a Martian invasion, he has become more cooperative, and worked with MI-13 and MI5 against Dracula.
- Leiko Wu is introduced as a femme fatale like those in the Bond films. She is a beautiful Chinese-British woman who is torn between her history with Reston and her growing attraction to Shang-Chi. Though initially sarcastic and self-possessed to the point of arrogance, her relationship with her new lover causes her to become more contemplative.
- M'Nai / Midnight is an African agent of Fu Manchu and an elite assassin of the Si-Fan. As a child, M'Nai's village was raided by British forces due to it being one of Fu Manchu's many headquarters. Fu Manchu, impressed with the orphaned child's stoic nature, adopted and raised him alongside his son Shang-Chi. Due to his badly disfigured face, he always wore a mask. Fu Manchu sent him to kill Shang-Chi after his son turned his back on him, even though Shang-Chi and M'Nai considered themselves brothers. Midnight died as a result of their second battle, but was later resurrected as Midnight Sun by the alien Kree in a cloned body and gifted with cosmic powers strong enough to challenge the Silver Surfer. After a couple of battles with the Surfer, he settled down to a peaceful life in the Blue Area of the Moon, where he was accepted by the Inhumans. This would not last long, as M'Nai would later resume his criminal activities to carry out his father's legacy and fulfill his thirst for vengeance against his former brother.
- Rufus T. Hackstabber is a memorable character who appeared only twice in the series; he keeps referring to Shang-Chi as "Chang-Shee". The character strongly resembles Groucho Marx and his fast-paced nonsensical patter plays off Shang-Chi's laconic seriousness. Hackstabber's name is a play on Rufus T. Firefly, Groucho's character in Duck Soup.
- Shen Kuei / the Cat is a master thief whose skill in martial arts equals Shang-Chi's. The meaning of the character's name is both similar and opposite to Shang-Chi's name. He is a sort of mirror image, a 'good bad guy' in opposition to Shang-Chi's 'bad good guy'. While they share mutual respect, the two always find themselves in opposition. He has recently appeared in Cable & Deadpool working as a mercenary for Cable. He has also defeated Deadpool, who looks at him as a Rock God among mercenaries and has also referred to him as "the Keith Moon of the spy trade" and "the Justin Timberlake of the Cherry Pop Club".
- Rufus "Super Midnight" Carter is an African-American kickboxing champion and antiques dealer who secretly works for the CIA. He is a light-hearted character who helps to draw out Shang-Chi's sense of whimsy in his several appearances. Carter's unusual nickname is accounted for by his origin. A colleague challenged Doug Moench to write a story using "Carter's Super Midnight" (the name of a brand of carbon paper) as a title.
- Xi-Shan Hao / Shadow Slasher is a Hong Kong assassin and enemy of Shang-Chi that first appeared in Master of Kung Fu #98 (1981), and was created by Doug Moench, Mike Zeck, and Gene Day.
- Li-Peng Kai / Kogar is a Hong Kong smuggler, gang leader, and enemy of Shang-Chi that first appeared in Master of Kung Fu #63 (1978), and was created by Doug Moench and Jim Craig.

== Master of Kung Fu: Battleworld ==
This series, written by Haden Blackman and illustrated by Dalibor Talajić, was part of the Secret Wars series which takes place in the Battleworld domain of K'un-L'un. Based on the mystical city of the same name from Earth-15513, it is a wuxia-inspired domain in which its inhabitants are martial artists with mystical abilities and techniques. Aside from Shang-Chi, the series includes reimaginings of characters from the original Master of Kung Fu series, as well as others from other Marvel comics.

=== Characters ===
- Shang-Chi: The "Rising Spirit" is the son of Emperor Zheng Zu, a skilled martial artist, and wanted for the murder of Lord Tuan. After defeating Zheng Zu, he becomes the new emperor of K'un-L'un.
- Zheng Zu: A combination of Zheng Zu and the Mandarin, he is the master of the Ten Rings and has ruled K'un-L'un for over a century.
- Rand-K'ai: The current master of the Iron Fist and sheriff of K'un-L'un.
- Red Sai: Zu's personal assassin and the former lover of Shang-Chi.
- Kitten: An outcast who was expelled from her school for failing to master an advanced technique, which left her permanently intangible.
- Tuan: The previous master of the Iron Fist and Zheng Zu's hated rival. He humiliated Zu, who murdered him in retaliation.
- Lock: A small Chinese dragon and a member of Kitten's band of outcasts. He later joins Shang-Chi's Lowest Caste school.
- Callisto: The original leader of the band of outcasts that approaches Shang-Chi for training.
- Sarah: A young outcast who has bones protruding over her body due to her failure to master the Marrow technique. She later becomes a member of Shang-Chi's Lowest Caste school.
- Caliban: A member of Callisto's band of outcasts. Despite being rejected from many masters due to his simple-mindedness, he possesses a keen photographic memory.
- Rahne: A member of Callisto's band of outcasts who was expelled from the Wolf Clan for falling in love with Cy, a member from a rival school. Due to her training being incomplete, she was transformed into a wolf hybrid form.
- Cy: A member of Callisto's band of outcasts who lost his right arm when protecting his lover Rahne from her former master, due to them being from rival schools. When Cy attempts to save Rahne from Rand-K'ai, Laughing Skull kills him, devastating Rahne and the others.
- Razor Fist: A student of the Ten Rings who is proficient in the Mortal Blade technique, which makes his arms razor-sharp. As punishment for his failure to capture his son, Zheng Zu cuts off Razor Fist's hands, which he replaces with blades.
- Typhus: A student of the Ten Rings who is proficient in the Flame Fist technique, which enables her to generate fire.
- Nightwind: A student of the Ten Rings who is proficient in the Nightbringer technique, which enables him to generate darkness.
- Laughing Skull: A sadistic member of the Ten Rings whose face is hidden by his namesake mask. Laughing Skull is shown to be proficient in the Zero Touch and Flame Fist techniques, which respectively generate ice and fire.
- Norrin: The personal herald of Emperor Zu.
- Shiro: Razor Fist is sent by Zheng Zu to have his stumps cauterized by Shiro after Razor Fist's arms are cut off by the Emperor. It is unknown if Shiro is a student of the Ten Rings or simply a servant to the throne.
- Lester: A retired assassin who now works as a farmer.
- T'Challa: The master of the Panther Clan, who has a passion for science and art.
- Ava: The master of the House of the Jade Tiger. Ava inherited the title of master from her brother Hector, who highly respected Shang-Chi.
- Lord Namor: The master of the Halls of Atlantis.
- Drew: The master of the Spider Cult, whose members possess spider-like abilities.
- Karnak: The master of the House of Terrigen Mists.
- Creed: The master of the Tooth and Claw school, whose members possess animalistic abilities.
- Spector: The master of the Faces of the Moon school.
- Lady Mandarin: The master of the School of Spirit Blades, whose members can generate blades made of psychic energy.

== Collected editions ==
- Master of Kung Fu: Battleworld collects Master of Kung Fu (vol. 2) #1-4 and Ronin #2, 112 pages, January 2016, ISBN 978-0785198796
- Shang-Chi: Master of Kung-Fu Omnibus
  - Vol. 1 collects Special Marvel Edition #15-16, Master of Kung Fu #17-37, Giant-Size Master of Kung Fu #1-4, Giant-Size Spider-Man #2 and material from Iron Man Annual #4, 696 pages, June 2016, ISBN 978-1302901295
  - Vol. 2 collects Master of Kung Fu #38-70 and Master of Kung Fu Annual #1, 664 pages, September 2016, ISBN 978-1302901301
  - Vol. 3 collects Master of Kung Fu #71-101 and What If? #16, 696 pages, March 2017, ISBN 978-1302901318
  - Vol. 4 collects Master of Kung Fu #102-125, Marvel Comics Presents #1-8 and Master of Kung Fu: Bleeding Black #1, 748 pages, October 2017, ISBN 978-1302901325
- Epic Collection
  - Master of Kung Fu Epic Collection: Weapon of the Soul collects Special Marvel Edition #15–16, Master of Kung Fu #17–28, Giant-Size Master of Kung Fu #1–4, Giant-Size Spider-Man #2 and Iron Man Annual #4 480, March 14, 2018, ISBN 978-1302901356
  - Master of Kung Fu Epic Collection: Fight Without Pity collects Master of Kung Fu #29–53; Master of Kung Fu Annual #1, June 26, 2019, ISBN 978-1302901363
  - Master of Kung Fu Epic Collection: Traitors to the Crown collects Master of Kung Fu #54–79, November 10, 2020, ISBN 978-1302901370
