= Black Jack Tarr =

Publication information
- Publisher: Marvel Comics
- First appearance: Master of Kung Fu #17 (Apr 1974)
- Created by: Steve Englehart; Jim Starlin

In-story information
- Alter ego: Jack Tarr
- Species: Human
- Team affiliations: Freelance Restorations
- Partnerships: Shang-Chi; Leiko Wu; Clive Reston
- Abilities: Excellent hand-to-hand combat, experienced in using firearms.

"Black" Jack Tarr is a fictional character appearing in American comic books published by Marvel Comics. He is Sir Denis Nayland Smith's aide-de-camp.

== Fictional character biography ==
Jack Tarr is an officer in the British Army who, having received a discharge from the military, undertakes positions within fictionalized versions of the British Foreign Service, MI-6, and then eventually under the command of Sir Denis Nayland Smith. While serving with Smith, Tarr comes into contact with Shang-Chi and a small band of adventurers fighting a covert war against Fu Manchu. When Fu is defeated, Tarr joins Freelance Restorations, a group of private adventurers.

Tarr's group comes under attack by Comte de Saint Germain, a seeming immortal who inherits the killers and cultists and resources of Fu Manchu. Germain captures Leiko Wu, Tarr's agent and Shang-Chi's ex-girlfriend. Clive Reston and Tarr have a shootout with an assassination team on the docks of Singapore after yet another safe-house is uncovered. Shang-Chi saves them from certain death. Some time later, Tarr rejoins MI-6 as an agent and confidant of Clive Reston.

=== Marvel NOW! ===
Tarr has been promoted to the director of MI-6. After Leiko Wu is murdered in London's Chinatown while on an undercover mission to infiltrate the triads, Tarr reunites with Shang-Chi, who has come to London to investigate Leiko's death. Although Tarr tells Shang of Leiko's darker change in demeanor, he lets him continue with his investigation. It is later revealed that Tarr and MI-6 are discretely monitoring Shang-Chi's activities. Tarr tips off Lin Sun to Shang-Chi's location when he and the Sons of the Tiger arrive in London to help their friend and the Daughters of the Dragon. After Midnight Sun's ritual with the Mao Shan Pai causes a citywide electrical interference, MI-6 tracks the energy source to White Dragon's estate outside London, where Tarr deduces Shang-Chi is. Tarr and his men storm the estate; the recently resurrected Leiko escapes while White Dragon's men are arrested.

=== Shang-Chi and the Ten Rings ===
After Shang-Chi assumes leadership of the Five Weapons Society and acquires the Ten Rings, Tarr dispatches Leiko and Reston to keep Shang-Chi preoccupied with a fake rescue mission while he and his men retrieve the Rings. When MI6's and MI13's tampering causes the Ten Rings to summon an alien parasite called the Wyrm of Desolation, Shang-Chi reacquires the Rings to rescue them. Shang-Chi admonishes Tarr and his former friends for betraying him and leaves with the Ten Rings.

== Other versions ==
In the Ultimate Marvel universe, Jack Tarr is the head of MI6's Special Section, a group of covert agents working for Pete Wisdom.
