= List of Marvel Comics characters: W =

== W'Kabi ==
W'Kabi is a character appearing in Marvel Comics. The character, created by Roy Thomas and John Buscema, first appeared in Avengers #62 (January 1969).

W'Kabi is a Wakandan and T'Challa's loyal second-in-command. He and Zuri are killed by Morlun while attempting to protect T'Challa, and are buried next to each other.

=== W'Kabi in other media ===
- W'Kabi appears in Black Panther (2010), voiced by Phil Morris.
- W'Kabi appears in Black Panther (2018), portrayed by Daniel Kaluuya. This version is T'Challa's best friend, Okoye's husband, and the chief of the Border Tribe, who utilize trained white rhinoceroses as shock cavalry. He ends up misguided and is among those that side with Killmonger. During the final battle between Killmonger's forces and those loyal to T'Challa, W'Kabi is unable to take Okoye's life when she gets between him and M'Baku causing W'Kabi to order the Border Tribe to surrender. While his fate was unknown in the first film, it was mentioned in Black Panther: Wakanda Forever that W'Kabi was fired from T'Challa's services.

== Dorothy Walker ==
- Further reading: Dorothy Walker at the Comic Book DB (archived from the original); Dorothy Walker at the Grand Comics Database

Dorothy Walker is a character in Marvel Comics. She was created by Stuart Little and Ruth Atkinson and first appeared in Miss America Magazine #2 (November 1944). She was reintroduced in The Defenders #89 (November 1980) by David Michelinie and Mike Harris as a radical departure from her conception.

Dorothy Walker is introduced as Betty Walker, the doting mother of Patsy Walker. This existence is revealed to have been a comic book written by Dorothy and loosely inspired by the teenage Patsy's life. Because of this Patsy was cared for by their housekeeper Dolly Donahue. While Dorothy bathes in the success of her comic, Patsy loathes it and their relationship is heavily strained. When she divorces her husband, Joshua, she gets custody of Patsy and her brother Mickey due to her wealth.

Dorothy does not approve of Patsy's marriage to Buzz Baxter and when the two end up divorcing, Dorothy loses contact with her daughter. Years later, Dorothy is stricken with cancer and dies before she is able to see Patsy again. Patsy realizes that despite her mother's sometimes cold attitude towards her, she was doing everything she could to forgive her. Unbeknownst to her, Dorothy attempted to make a deal with the demon Avarrish. In exchange for Patsy's soul, Dorothy would be restored to life without cancer. However, Avarrish fails and Dorothy remains dead.

=== Dorothy Walker in other media ===
Dorothy Walker appears in Jessica Jones, portrayed by Rebecca De Mornay. This version is a talent agent and has a much more abusive relationship with her daughter.

== Walking Stiletto ==
The Walking Stiletto is a robot supervillain created by Stan Lee, John Romita, Sr., and Sal Buscema, first appeared in Captain America #114 (June 1969). Within the context of the stories, the Walking Stiletto is a creation and agent of AIM. When Sharon Carter attacks a group of AIM leaders, they release the Stiletto to attack her, but she is saved by Captain America and Rick Jones, who destroy the robot. Many years later, the Walking Stiletto is among the robotic collection of the Reanimator, who unleashes it on Wolverine and Nova. Wolverine eviscerates the Walking Stiletto, rendering it inoperative.

In the "Iron Man 2020" storyline, Walking Stiletto joins the A.I. Army.

== Wall ==
The Wall is a supervillain created by Thomas Whedon, Jean Thomas, Winslow Mortimer, Mike Esposito, and Tony Mortellaro, first appearing in Spidey Super Stories #8 (1975). Real name Joshua Waldemeyer, a former high school student with an after-school job assisting a bricklayer. In a bricklaying accident collapsing on Waldemeyer, it transformed him into "The Wicked Wall" and lead to a life of crime. The Wall interrupts a Mets baseball game which Spider-Man is attending and the two fight only to be kicked out of the stadium for being on the game field.

In 2021 for April Fools' Day, the Wall was jokingly announced as a playable character for Marvel Strike Force.

== Wallflower ==
Wallflower

Publication information
- Publisher: Marvel Comics
- First appearance: New Mutants, vol. 2 #2 (August 2003)
- Created by: Nunzio DeFilippis; Christina Weir; Keron Grant

In-story information
- Alter ego: Laurie Collins
- Species: Human Mutant
- Team affiliations: New Mutants training squad; Xavier Institute
- Abilities: Pheromone manipulation

Wallflower (Laurie Collins) is a character appearing in American comic books published by Marvel Comics. She is a member of the student body of the Xavier Institute and a member of the New Mutants. After the events of M-Day transpired, she was one of a handful of mutants to keep her powers. She first appeared in New Mutants (vol. 2) #2 (June 2003) and was killed in New X-Men (vol. 2) #25 (June 2006). The character was revived during the Krakoan Age.

Laurie is a second-generation mutant. She inherited her superpowers from her father, Sean Garrison, who used his ability to manipulate people and get money, fame, and women. Laurie's mother Gail was one of these women. After becoming pregnant with his child, Gail became immune to his power and broke up with him, deciding to raise Laurie alone. Laurie grows up a loner. While on vacation, her powers manifest, causing every boy on the beach to become attracted to her. After she becomes popular, her mother realizes what is going on, and tells Laurie that using her power on people is wrong. As she has no control over it and unwillingly causes people to mirror her own emotions, Laurie gets scared and becomes even more withdrawn than before.

After the Xavier Institute becomes public, Laurie is sent there by her mother, and moves to Salem Center to stay near her, so that she could have one person whose reactions she could trust. Although she insists that Laurie live at the school, so that she could make friends, Laurie remains a loner and goes through several roommates in quick succession. Eventually Sofia Mantega is paired with Laurie and, with her power to blow pheromones away, Laurie no longer has to worry about accidentally manipulating her roommate. Under pressure from Sofia, she also begins developing acquaintances with David Alleyne and Kevin Ford. On a visit to meet Sofia's former butler, they are attacked by the Reavers, and Laurie is stabbed through the heart. She is saved by Josh Foley, who uses his power to heal her. Laurie develops a crush on Josh, but before she can pursue it, he falls head-over-heels for Rahne Sinclair. Laurie remains smitten with Josh, and the sight of him in danger gives her the emotional fortitude to take control of her powers.

After the mansion is destroyed and rebuilt, she is placed on the New Mutants squad with Josh, Sofia, David, Surge and Kevin and given the codename Wallflower. When Rahne breaks up with Josh, saying that a relationship with him is inappropriate since she is on the faculty, he begins dating Laurie to make Rahne jealous. Rahne, feeling it would be healthier for Josh to be with Laurie after she sees the two returning from a date, breaks off her relationship with Josh for good. Kevin spies on their conversation and uses the information to break Josh and Laurie up. Laurie is left embittered by the experience, going so far as to use her pheromones to manipulate Prodigy into kissing her at the dance to make Josh jealous. Sofia realizes what is happening, and the event adds to the fast disintegration of the squad.

Thereafter, Sofia pushes all the New Mutants into a camp out for one night on the Xavier Institute grounds. While the initial attempts by Sofia at forcing a resolution come to disaster, a fist-fight between Josh and David leads Laurie to confess to Josh what had happened at the dance. Later she - along with the other New Mutants - overhear him pouring his heart out to Icarus, leading her to forgive him enough to be friends. After the events of House of M, where almost the entire mutant population lost their powers, Laurie was one of the few who retained the mutant gene. Panic spread throughout school in the aftermath of the Decimation and, assuming he had lost his powers too, Kevin reaches out to Laurie, withering away her arm. Shortly after this, Laurie is shot and killed by a sniper working for William Stryker. Long after her death, Laurie was resurrected during the Krakoan Age.

== Morris Walters ==
Morris Walters is a character appearing in American comic books published by Marvel Comics.

Morris Walters is the father of Jennifer Walters / She-Hulk and the husband of Elaine Walters.

=== Morris Walters in other media ===
- A variation of the character named Cliff Walters appears in The Incredible Hulk episode "Down Memory Lane", voiced by Stan Lee.
- Morris Walters appears in She-Hulk: Attorney at Law, portrayed by Mark Linn-Baker.

== War-Cry ==
Julia Gao is a character appearing in American comic books published by Marvel Comics. The character, created by Cody Ziglar and Federico Vicentini, first appeared in Miles Morales: Spider-Man vol. 2 #1 (December 2022) as an officer of the NYPD and in Deadpool vol. 9 #12 (March 2025) as War-Cry.

When working as a police officer, Julia Gao's partner gets killed trying to interrupt a fight between Venom and Carnage, causing her to despise superheroes, vigilantes and supervillains. Under Wilson Fisk's Anti-Vigilante Act, Gao becomes the leader of the Cape-Killers.

After Luke Cage repeals the Anti-Vigilante Act, Gao becomes a fugitive. She is enhanced as an avatar of Ares to antagonize Spider-Man and Deadpool.

== War Dog ==
War Dog is a name used by several different dogs in Marvel Comics that have bonded with symbiotes. The character was created by Dan Slott, Paulo Siqueira and Ronan Cliquet, and first appeared in The Amazing Spider-Man #654 (April 2011).

=== Samson ===
Samson is a German Shepherd. Samson is General Brad Dodge's pet dog from Washington, D.C. who temporarily bonded with the Venom symbiote to help Flash Thompson against the Spider-King.

=== Second version ===
Another German Shepherd is Mercury Team's dog, trained extensively as a symbiotically enhanced duo with Chief petty officer Marcus Simms as Lasher in Doverton, Colorado. Mercury Team's symbiote soldiers are killed by Cletus Kasady, but the group's mascot survives and helps Deadpool defeat Carnage, by bonding with Phage, Lasher, Agony, and Riot before returning to the government.

=== Mitch ===
Mitch is Bullet's hunting dog who bonds with Phage to participate in a conspiracy alongside his "siblings", led by the Carnage symbiote involving the Friends of Humanity, only to be defeated by Thompson, Silence and Toxin, and taken into Alchemax's custody.

=== War Dog in other media ===
Gemini, a dog loosely inspired by War Dog, appears in Venom (2018).

== Warbird ==
Warbird is the name of two characters appearing in American comic books published by Marvel Comics.

=== Ava'Dara Naganandini ===
Warbird is a character in X-Men comic books. She was created by Jason Aaron and Chris Bachalo, first appearing in Wolverine and the X-Men #1 (October 2011). She is a member of the Shi'ar Warbirds who comes to Earth as a bodyguard to Gladiator's son Kubark (Kid Gladiator) as he attends the Jean Grey School for Higher Learning.

She would later go on to join the X-Men in Astonishing X-Men vol. 3 #48 (March 2012). She eventually left to rejoin the Shi'ar empire, fighting against threats such as Asgardians, and took on her own Symbiote, ZZZXX.

== Stewart Ward ==
- Further reading: Stewart Ward at the Comic Book DB (archived from the original); Stewart Ward at the Grand Comics Database

Senator Stewart Ward is a character in Marvel Comics. The character, created by Howard Mackie and John Romita Jr., first appears in Peter Parker: Spider-Man (vol. 2) #4.

Ward is a CIA agent named Sentry who, with Seeker (Arthur Stacy) and Ranger, infiltrates Hydra to destroy their alien experiments. Sentry is actually a double agent and Stacy and Ranger are forced to try and kill him. During the scuffle, Sentry is contaminated with an alien virus, the "Z'Nox", and develops amnesia. Sentry reestablishes himself as Stewart Ward and becomes a successful senator for New York, secretly working to spread the alien virus. Eventually, Spider-Man and Stacy hit him with a pathogen that causes him to explode into an antidote, curing the infected.

=== Stewart Ward in other media ===
A character loosely inspired by Stewart Ward named Christian Ward appears in Agents of S.H.I.E.L.D., portrayed by Tim DeKay as an adult and Alex Neustaedter as a child. This version is the sadistic older brother of Grant and Thomas Ward, who he tortured when they were young. As an adult, Christian enters politics, becoming a candidate for the U.S. Senate, in an attempt to locate and shut down S.H.I.E.L.D. After Phil Coulson meets with Christian, offering him Grant in exchange for his support, Christian publicly reveals Grant's ties to Hydra. However, Grant escapes, ambushes Christian, and forces him to confess to his childhood wrongdoings before meeting with their parents, killing all three off-screen, and planting audio of the confession to frame their deaths as a murder-suicide.

== Raymond Warren ==
Raymond Aaron Warren is a character appearing in American comic books published by Marvel Comics. The character, created by Stan Lee and Steve Ditko, first appeared in Amazing Fantasy #15 (August 1962).

Raymond Warren was a science teacher of Midtown High School in Queens, New York, and the brother of Miles Warren / Jackal. Raymond had a multi-faceted attitude towards Peter Parker / Spider-Man, and was behind Peter's early adventures against the Tinkerer and the Living Brain.

Raymond was murdered by the Jackal for his identity and appearance, but his corpse and identity theft are exposed by his former student and Miles Morales / Spider-Man.

=== Raymond Warren in other media ===
- A character based on Raymond Warren named Aaron Warren appears in The Spectacular Spider-Man, voiced by Brian George.
- A composite character version of Raymond Warren appears in Spider-Man, voiced by John DiMaggio. This version is the uncle of Gwen Stacy / Ghost-Spider, and a scientist who specialized in genetics before mutating himself into the Jackal.

== Warskrull ==
The Warskrull, also known as the Super-Skrull, is the name of several characters appearing in American comic books published by Marvel Comics.

=== First version ===
The first depiction was created by Chris Claremont and Jim Lee, and first appeared in Uncanny X-Men #275 (February 1991). A genetically-engineered group of Skrulls infiltrated the Shi'ar empire, utilizing a Nexus Amplifier to assume total physical discorporation of their targets and adopt their superpowers along with their physical appearance. The Warskrulls captured the Starjammers in order to impersonate the Chamberlain to commit murders and genocide upon various Shi'ar affiliated races as well as Professor X for mental control over Lilandra Neramani, but the Warskrulls were eventually defeated by the combined forces of the X-Men and Deathbird, to which the Shi'ar vowed to weed out the Warskrulls.

=== Pagon ===
Pagon is a Skrull who impersonated Elektra.

=== Criti Noll ===
Criti Noll is a Skrull who impersonated Hank Pym.

=== Jarvis the Skrull ===
Jarvis the Skrull is a Skrull who impersonated Edwin Jarvis. The character, created by Brian Michael Bendis and David Finch, first appeared in The New Avengers #3 (February 2005). During the "Secret Invasion" storyline, "Jarvis" utilized the Skrulls' computer virus from Avengers Tower to disable Iron Man (Tony Stark) and S.H.I.E.L.D. Jarvis the Skrull then revealed to Maria Hill that multiple Skrulls were disguised as government agents before he realized his captive utilized a Life Model Decoy as a distraction for the Helicarrier's destruction, but he survived. Jarvis the Skrull manipulated Jessica Jones to fight with the various heroes and villains against Veranke's armada, leaving Danielle Cage in his care. During the "Dark Reign" storyline, Jarvis the Skrull was killed by Bullseye.

=== Greenie ===
Greenie is a Skrull who infiltrated S.H.I.E.L.D. The character, created by Jeph Loeb and Christos Cage, first appeared in Fallen Son: The Death of Captain America #5 (August 2007). Greenie impersonated Dum Dum Dugan which fooled Maria Hill and Abigail Brand on various matters, such as the Hulk's vengeance and leading the Skrulls posing as government agents, before "Dum-Dum" infiltrated S.W.O.R.D. to ensure the Peak orbital base's destruction for the Skull empire's invasion of Earth. Greenie hijacked the Fifty State Initiative before being killed by 3-D Man.

=== Rl'nnd ===
Rl'nnd is a Skrull who utilized the powers of the X-Men.

=== Khn'nr ===
Khn'nr is a Skrull who impersonated Captain Marvel (Mar-Vell). His botched mental conditioning caused Khn'nr's personality to be erased and left his false persona of Captain Marvel dominant.

=== Pitt'o Nili ===
Pitt'o Nili is a Skrull who impersonated Captain America (Steve Rogers). The character, created by Brian Michael Bendis and Leinil Francis Yu, first appeared in Secret Invasion #1 (April 2008). He was brainwashed as per Veranke's orders among a Skrull group disguised as superheroes who fake an escape to Earth in order to confuse the Avengers' splinter groups in the Savage Land. "Captain America" gets exposed by poison darts deadly to Skrulls, and killed by Shanna the She-Devil and Ka-Zar.

==== Pitt'o Nili in other media ====
- Pitt'o Nili appears in The Avengers: Earth's Mightiest Heroes, voiced by Brian Bloom. This version impersonated Captain America to disrupt the Avengers for the Skrulls' invasion of Earth.
- Pitt'o Nili appears as a boss in Marvel Avengers: Battle for Earth, voiced by Roger Craig Smith.
- Pitt'o Nili appears as a boss in Marvel Heroes.
- An alternate universe version of Pitt'o Nili makes a non-speaking cameo appearance in the What If...? series finale "What If... What If...?".

=== Chrell ===
Chrell is a Skrull training instructor and commander.

=== X'iv ===
X'iv is a Skrull trained by Chrell.

=== Siri ===
Siri is a Skrull. The character, created by Brian Michael Bendis and Leinil Yu, debuted in The New Avengers #40 (April 2008). She possessed the abilities of Elektra and Ghost Rider. Siri tries to replace the former, but is killed in battle.

== Warstar ==
- First appearance: X-Men #137 (September 1980)
- Created by: Chris Claremont and John Byrne
- Species: Two symbiotically linked sentient mechanoids
- Teams: Imperial Guard
- Abilities: B'nee: electricity generation C'cil: gigantic, superhuman strength and durability
- Aliases: B'nee and C'cil

Warstar is a character appearing in American comic books published by Marvel Comics. The character, created by Chris Claremont and John Byrne, first appeared in X-Men #137 (September 1980).

A warrior serving in the Royal Elite of the Shi'ar Imperial Guard, Warstar is actually two symbiotically linked sentient mechanoids consisting of a small one named B'nee who can generate electricity and a large one named C'cil who is gigantic and immensely strong and durable; B'nee rides on C'cil's back.

=== Warstar in other media ===
- Warstar appears in X-Men: The Animated Series.
- Warstar appears as a mini-boss in Marvel: Ultimate Alliance, voiced by John Cygan.

== Natalie Washington ==
Natalie Washington is a character appearing in American comic books published by Marvel Comics. The character, created by Brian Michael Bendis and Stefano Caselli, first appeared in Invincible Iron Man vol. 4 #1 (November 2016).

Natalie Washington was the neighbor of Riri Williams. She and Riri's stepfather Gary were killed in a drive-by shooting at Marquette Park. During the "Iron Man 2020" storyline, Ironheart's armor was given an A.I. based on Natalie Washington called N.A.T.A.L.I.E.

=== Natalie Washington in other media ===
Natalie Washington and N.A.T.A.L.I.E. appear in Ironheart, portrayed by Lyric Ross.

== Washout ==
Washout

Publication information
- Publisher: Marvel Comics
- First appearance: X-Force #129 (August 2002)
- Created by: Peter Milligan; Duncan Fegredo

In-story information
- Alter ego: John Lopez
- Species: Human Mutant
- Team affiliations: Underground; Weapon X New Mutants; X-Force
- Abilities: Water manipulation; Water transformation

Washout (John Lopez) is a mutant character appearing in American comic books published by Marvel Comics. The character first appeared in a one-page cameo in X-Force #129 (August 2002) before being given a larger role in the 2002–2003 Weapon X series.

John Lopez was a chronic bed-wetter as a child, until he discovered that he had the mutant ability to generate a spurt of water from his body on touch. Having no friends and no family, John wanted to try his luck at an audition to join the new media-savvy X-Force team. Taking on the codename Washout, John competed in a contest but was not recruited. Soon after, John was approached by Malcolm Colcord to join the Weapon X project. Accepting the offer, Washout underwent a process that enhanced his mutant ability to the point where Washout had the ability to transform his body into water, project high pressure jets of water from his arms, shape the water into any form, and even manipulate or siphon off the water within another person's body. However, the process had a severe side effect in that Washout's powers now gradually began to dehydrate him. The more frequently he used them, the closer he would come to killing himself. His body was slowly cracking apart. Washout found out about these side effects and joined fellow Weapon X agent Brent Jackson in a conspiracy against the Director. They later started to work with Soldier X's Underground movement.

Washout helped the Underground infiltrate the Weapon X compound by temporarily shutting down the power. At the same time, he attacked and attempted to kill the Director. He caused the water within the Director's body to boil, but the side effects from his powers caused Washout to die before he could finish off the Director.

=== Washout in other media ===
Washout appears in the Wolverine and the X-Men episode "Greetings from Genosha".

== Wasp ==
Wasp is the name of several characters appearing in American comic books published by Marvel Comics.

== Wave ==
Wave made her debut in War of the Realms, New Agents of Atlas in 2019. She was born in Mactan, Cebu in the Visayas, Philippines.

Pearl Pangan had a natural affinity for the water since she was a child. She is recruited for her swimming strength to conduct experiments with a company called Alontek. When Triumph Division raids the site and shuts down the experiments, she discovers she possesses hydrokinesis (the ability to control water). Triumph Division recruits her to protect the Philippines, but later fires her for abandoning her post in the War of the Realms. During the War of the Realms, Wave and the Agents of Atlas battle Sindr, the daughter of Surtur, to prevent her from melting the polar ice caps and turning Asia into New Muspelheim.

=== Wave in other media ===
- Pearl Pangan appears in Your Friendly Neighborhood Spider-Man, voiced by Cathy Ang. This version is a student of Rockford T. Bales High School and the ex-girlfriend of Lonnie Lincoln.
- Wave appears as an unlockable playable character in Marvel: Future Fight.
- Wave appears as an unlockable playable character in Marvel Super War.
- Wave appears in Marvel Duel.
- Wave appears in Marvel Snap.

== Kate Waynesboro ==
Dr. Katherine "Kate" Waynesboro was created by Bill Mantlo and Sal Buscema, and has been primarily a supporting character of the Hulk. She first appeared in The Incredible Hulk (vol. 2) #287.

Bruce Banner hires Waynesboro as a laboratory assistant during a period of time when Banner's rational persona controls the Hulk, and eventually enters into a romantic relationship with him. During a battle with the Abomination, Banner discovers that Waynesboro is also an agent of S.H.I.E.L.D., sent as a "minder" to ensure that Banner did not lose control of the Hulk again, which called her actions, including their romance, into question.

The Abomination kidnaps Waynesboro and offers her as a hostage to a faction of A.I.M. that had recently taken over MODOK's base, where she is subjected to the same process that had created MODOK, dubbing her "Ms. MODOK". MODOK states his intention to take her as a consort, to which she assents. When the Hulk objects, MODOK attacks him and atomizes the Abomination as a demonstration of power. Aghast at MODOK's casual murder, Ms. MODOK turns against him, and MODOK forces her back into the transformation chamber, restoring her to her original state.

Waynesboro quits S.H.I.E.L.D. to continue her personal and professional relationship with Banner, but after his return from the so-called "Secret Wars", it is apparent that Banner is losing control of the Hulk as S.H.I.E.L.D. feared. Waynesboro returns to S.H.I.E.L.D. to help capture the Hulk, but ultimately leaves, unable to bear witnessing Banner's failing struggle to regain control.

Waynseboro is later seen receiving information regarding the Warbound members from their former teammate Miek to find their biggest weaknesses. Three weeks later she is sent to aid fellow S.H.I.E.L.D. agents in capturing the Warbound, but the group kidnap her to help one of their wounded members. She is caught in a plot by the Leader to irradiate the world with gamma rays, working with the Warbound to stop the threat. She gains Warbound member Hiroim's Oldstrong powers when he is killed in battle. She meets with Norman Osborn to get the Warbound pardoned for their crimes during World War Hulk, only to find out that he already has, being "a big believer in the concept of redemption".

H.A.M.M.E.R. captures Waynesboro to extract the Oldpower for their own use, but Banner and Skaar assault the facility and rescue her.

== Web-Man ==
Web-Man is a character appearing in American comic books published by Marvel Comics.

On Earth-57780, Web-Man is the evil clone of a Spider-Man with inverted colors created by Doctor Doom's Twin Machine.

=== Web-Man in other media ===
Web-Man makes a non-speaking cameo appearance in Spider-Man: Across the Spider-Verse as a member of Miguel O'Hara's Spider-Society.

== James Wesley ==
James Wesley is a minor character in Marvel Comics. The character, created by Frank Miller and David Mazzucchelli, first appeared in Daredevil #227 (February 1986). He is a faithful assistant of the Kingpin (Wilson Fisk).

He is ordered by the Kingpin to locate Nuke for the sole purpose of destroying Hell's Kitchen. After Daredevil saves Hell's Kitchen, Wesley fears that said events would connect the Kingpin to the authorities.

Wesley later comes back under his employer when tasked with handling reporter Sarah Dewey's affairs, and is also revealed to double as a criminal lawyer for anyone under his boss's payroll.

=== James Wesley in other media ===
- A character inspired by James Wesley named Wesley Welch appears in Daredevil (2003), portrayed by Leland Orser.
- James Wesley appears in Daredevil (2015) and the Daredevil: Born Again episode "The Grand Design" (2026), portrayed by Toby Leonard Moore. This version acts as an intermediary with Wilson Fisk's various associates and as a fixer before being killed by Karen Page. Additionally, he has history with Buck Cashman.

== Charlie Weiderman ==
Charles Weiderman is a character appearing in American comic books published by Marvel Comics. The character has appeared in The Amazing Spider-Man #515 and created by J. Michael Straczynski, Mike Deodato Jr. and Mark Brooks

As a student at Midtown High School, Charlie was bullied by a group of students led by a teen named Rich, a football player on the school team. Later, he tried to pull a knife on his tormentors only for the coach to catch him. Peter covered it up by stating that the knife belonged to his Uncle Ben. When Charlie slashed his tormentors' tires, he fled to the Parker house for protection. Charlie declared innocence and was backed up by Peter's Uncle Ben. After the bullies left, Ben asked Charlie if he actually slashed their tires. When Charlie was afraid to tell the truth, Ben Parker told him never to see Peter again and stated he would've respected Charlie if he admitted to the action.

As an adult, Charlie still searched for vindication. His father died and left him enough money to help fund the creation of a porous polymer compound that could completely cover a soldier and protect him from harm. Charlie eventually realized that his "skinsuit" would have to be composed of the energy-absorbing metal vibranium to protect the wearer from any impacts. Charlie talked Peter into a letter of recommendation that swayed industrialist Tony Stark, aware of Spider-Man's true identity and lead to believe that Peter was an active partner on the project, into authorizing a large grant. When Peter saw Charlie's hasty shortcuts involving the volatile vibranium however, he wanted to pull the plug on the project. Frantic, Charlie rushed the procedure and only moments too late realized Peter had been right; the vibranium blew up, encasing him in a skinsuit that bestowed the metal's properties on him.

Charlie regains some degree of speech and movement when he volunteered for Harry Osborn's Promethean Trials as a test subject for a chemical that will cure Harry's ex-brother-in-law Mark Raxton. The experiment is a success and Charlie is freed from the skinsuit.

== Evangeline Whedon ==
Evangeline Whedon

Publication information
- Publisher: Marvel Comics
- First appearance: X-Treme X-Men #21 (April, 2003)
- Created by: Chris Claremont; Salvador Larroca

In-story information
- Alter ego: Evangeline "Vange" Whedon
- Species: Human Mutant
- Team affiliations: X-Men; Mutant Rights Coalition; The 198; X-Corporation
- Abilities: Ability to transform into red dragon

Evangeline "Vange" Whedon is a character, a mutant appearing in American comic books published by Marvel Comics. Whedon is a lawyer who possesses the mutant ability to transform into a dragon. Her first appearance was in X-Treme X-Men #21.

Whedon is a lawyer and a member of the Mutant Rights Coalition (or Mutant Rights League). Her ability to shapeshift is primarily triggered when she comes in contact with blood. Evangeline used to be a successful prosecutor until others learned that she was a mutant. She was fired instantly and evicted from her apartment the next day. Her fiancé left her with an e-mail and her family disowned her.

Whedon retained her powers after the "Decimation" of the mutant population – the government considers her a 'Significant' national security threat. She works as the X-Men's lawyer. After the Second Coming crossover, Whedon defends Teon Macik to keep him from being returned to the custody of his parents.

Vange Whedon is a metamorph and can transform herself into a red dragon. This can be triggered consciously or by the presence of blood.

=== Evangeline Whedon in other media ===
Evangeline Whedon appears in The Gifted, portrayed by Erinn Ruth. This version is the co-founder of the Mutant Underground.

== White Bear ==
White Bear is a character appearing in American comic books published by Marvel Comics.

White Bear is a polar bear who was experimented on by Nathaniel Essex and was released into the Canadian wilderness. The polar bear found it difficult to survive and eventually stumbled across Wolverine's wolf pack and killed them all. Wolverine returned and faced off against White Bear. After a vicious battle, White Bear was slain.

== White Cat ==
White Cat is a character appearing in American comic books published by DC Comics. He was originally created for a non-canon New Champions variant cover of Amazing Spider-Man #36, where White Cat was depicted as the sidekick of Black Cat in the vein of Spider-Boy. White Cat made his canon debut in Miles Morales: Spider-Man Vol. 2 #36 (August 2025) and was created by Kris Anka and Cody Zigla.

Lance Lewis is a cat burglar with luck-stealing ability. He was the partner of fellow burglar Inari.

== White Dragon ==
White Dragon is the name of three characters appearing in American comic books published by Marvel Comics.

=== First White Dragon ===
The origin of the original White Dragon is unknown. At some point in his past, he served as a scientist in a Chinese organization called the Council of Nine. While the scientists of the Council of Nine are known to be brilliant, his special scientific abilities were brought to question by the Council of Nine. The scientist lost face and went into self-exile until he can prove himself. He was joined by his lover Shara-Lee, the daughter of the man who had denounced him.

White Dragon has his agents kidnap Tony Stark and bring him to his submarine, intending to use a device called the Transcriber to reprogram his mind. White Dragon succeeeds, but Stark learns that he has been manipulated and attacks White Dragon's transmission. Believing his efforts to be a failure, White Dragon initiates the self-destruct of the device he placed in Stark's head. The device does not harm Stark, since the Iron Man armor protecting him to the extent that he is only rendered unconscious. Upon crashing to the ground, Stark is rescued by Guardsman. Upon viewing the footage of Iron Man crashing to the ground, White Dragon deduces that Stark is Iron Man.

White Dragon tries to take control of Stark a second time, but is unsuccessful, with Stark's armor blocking the Transcriber's effects. Iron Man destroys the blast tanks of White Dragon's submarine, causing it to sink to the bottom of the river. Shara-Lee revealed that she had been in control the whole time and that White Dragon had been a pawn. White Dragon recovers after hearing Shara-Lee call him a dupe and activates the submarine's self-destruct sequence, killing them both.

=== Second White Dragon ===
The second White Dragon is the leader of the Dragon Lords in Chinatown. His group attempts to force Philip Chang, who owns a restaurant in New York City with his aunt and uncle, to join them. Chang is rescued by Spider-Man, who defeats White Dragon and hands him over to the police.

During the Dark Reign storyline, Mister Negative kills some of White Dragon's men in Sunset Park to gain control of Chinatown. Shortly after that, White Dragon joins Hood's crime syndicate. White Dragon meets with Negative, stating that Hood is going to take over his business and that Negative will pay 65% of all his earnings to Hood. White Dragon is surprised that Negative agreed to it, but then Negative shakes White Dragon's hand to corrupt him. Hood shoots White Dragon several times, causing him to return to his normal state.

=== Third White Dragon ===
A third White Dragon appeared leading his henchmen into a gunfight with Owl's gang. White Dragon and Owl are brutally beaten by the Superior Spider-Man (Doctor Octopus' mind in Peter Parker's body). The remainder of White Dragon's gang who evaded capture are recruited to join the Goblin Nation.

== White Jennie ==
Jennifer "White Jennie" Royce is a character appearing in American comic books published by Marvel Comics.

Jennifer Royce is the former secretary for Heroes for Hire, the detective agency helmed by Luke Cage and Danny Rand.

After the agency disbanded, she was convicted of the murder of her abusive boyfriend Eugene Mason. She tricked Cage and Rand to help her with her case, which was a front for her criminal activities with Black Mariah.

== White Sword ==
White Sword (Blue) is a character appearing in American comic books published by Marvel Comics, created by writer Jonathan Hickman and artist Pepe Larraz, and first appearing in X-Men (vol. 5) #12 (September 2020).

Blue was a mutant born on Okkara. When Daemons from Amenth attacked Okkara, he took up his fallen father's sword and took the name White Sword, leading his One Hundred Champions into Amenth as a vanguard and buying time for the rest of the Okkaran forces. He and his army were lost and presumed dead in Amenth, but in reality, they built a stronghold, the Ivory Spire, deep within the dimension to defend against the Daemon hordes. Over millennia, White Sword and his champions battled the Daemons daily, with the former resurrecting any champions killed in battle. This endless cycle eventually drove him mad, so much so that when Genesis encountered him during her counteroffensive against Annihilation, he saw her and her army as enemies and attacked.

White Sword is recruited by Famine and Death to fight for Arakko in the X of Swords tournament, on the condition that they would give him whatever he desired should they win. White Sword participates in three challenges, winning all of them and killing Gorgon in the final challenge. When Arakko loses the tournament, White Sword and his champions return to Amenth.

=== Powers and abilities of White Sword ===
White Sword is an Omega-level mutant with healing powers strong enough to resurrect the dead. He is also capable of placing those he heals under his control. If he releases someone from his control, he cannot heal or control them again. White Sword is very long-lived, being thousands of years old.

In combat, he wields a white sword named Purity, passed down to him from his father.

== White Tiger ==
=== Heroes for Hire ===
White Tiger is an animal superhero that became a member of the Heroes for Hire. Originally a white Bengal tigress, the High Evolutionary mutated her to track his rogue Man-Beast. She gained the ability to morph into a human woman, and back at will. She meets Iron Fist and falls in love with him, but her feelings are not reciprocated. She returns to the High Evolutionary and asks to be devolved back to her original state, to which he obliges.

=== Kasper Cole ===
White Tiger

Publication information
- Publisher: Marvel Comics
- First appearance: Black Panther (vol. 3) #50 (December 2002)
- Created by: Christopher Priest (writer); Dan Fraga (artist)

In-story information
- Alter ego: Kevin "Kasper" Cole
- Team affiliations: The Crew; NYPD
- Notable aliases: Black Panther
- Abilities: Peak human physical strength, speed, reflexes and reactions, agility and durability, Superhuman eyesight, Night vision

Kevin "Kasper" Cole is a character appearing in American comic books published by Marvel Comics. The character is the third to use the name White Tiger. He has also adopted the moniker of the Black Panther. The character was created by Christopher Priest and Dan Fraga and introduced in Black Panther (vol. 3) #50. With sales numbers declining on the third volume of Black Panther, the decision was made to retool the series. T'Challa, the original Black Panther, was replaced with a new character impersonating the Black Panther, starting with issue #50 (December 2002). According to writer Christopher Priest, this would be 'some guy who starts this gig, essentially, as a scam, but who evolves over the course of time to embrace and appreciate the rich heritage and culture of the Lord of the Wakandas'.

In issue #50 of the Black Panther, Kasper Cole makes his first appearance. He is an officer in the narcotics division of the New York Police Department's Organized Crime Control Bureau (OCCB), looking to be promoted to homicide detective. He lives with his mother Ruth and his pregnant girlfriend Gwen in a squalid apartment in Harlem. His father "Black" Jack is a former cop who was imprisoned on the charge of corruption.

The character was pitched by Priest as a 'dark satire of Spider-Man', in line with work he had done on DC Comics' Steel, who functioned similarly as a 'dysfunctional Superman'. Kasper Cole and his friends and family take many cues from Peter Parker and his supporting cast, with Kasper's mother Ruth correlating with Aunt May, his father Jack with Uncle Ben, and his girlfriend Gwen with Gwen Stacy.

The first storyline, "Black and White", running in issues #50 to #56, focuses on Kasper's investigation into the ties between his boss Sal Anthony and the criminal 66 Bridges gang. Suspended from the police force, he adopts the mantle of the Black Panther - stealing the costume from his Sergeant Tork, an ally of the Panther - so that he can gather evidence. Priest described "Black and White" as being 'about a war between The Black Panther (T'Challa) and the "white panther" (Hunter) over the soul of this young kid'.

Tom DeFalco once taught me that Spider-Man's motivation for being Spider-Man was to patrol the city looking for crimes so he could photograph himself in the act of stopping the crimes and sell the photos to Jameson to raise money to pay his rent which was always late. Kasper's motive is to wear the costume so he won't be recognized by the good guys or the bad guys as he goes about cleaning up his precinct so he can get a promotion to Detective so he can make enough money to marry his pregnant girlfriend and move them all out of Harlem.

— Creator Christopher Priest, 2003

Before the story arc concludes, it is revealed that 66 Bridges is led by Kasper's father as Kibuka (a plotline that has been left unresolved) and that Triage is his half-brother. Kasper does not succeed in taking down the gang, although he manages to expose a number of crooked cops. He has also struck a deal with his corrupt boss, who will help him take down 66 Bridges if Kasper locates his kidnapped son. This search is key to the final Black Panther story arc, "Ascension" (#59-62).

In order to find the child, Kasper makes a deal with T'Challa's nemesis Erik Killmonger, the then rightful holder of the Black Panther mantle. Given a synthetic version of the herbs that grant the Black Panther his powers, Kasper gains the enhanced skills necessary to locate the child. The arc and the series concludes with Kasper becoming a White Tiger, a sort of acolyte to the Black Panther cult, although he remains in Harlem. Before the final Black Panther arc was finished, Kasper Cole was already designated as one of the feature characters in the short-lived The Crew (2003–2004, 7 issues). He makes his first regular appearance in issue #1 and as the new White Tiger in issue #2. His character provides narration (the only one to do so) for the second, fourth, (part of the) sixth and seventh (the final) issue. In the series, Kasper teams with James Rhodes (War Machine), Danny Vincente (Junta) and Josiah X in taking on Triage and the 66 Bridges Gang. While Kasper's relationship with the other characters is fraught with conflict, they nonetheless manage to defeat Triage.

After the conclusion of The Crew, he is referenced in the Civil War: Battle Damage Report one-shot. During Civil War II, Kasper is shown in attendance at James Rhodes' funeral after he is killed by Thanos. Kasper is later shown retired from the world of superheroics, now focusing on his police career after having been kicked out of his apartment by Gwen. T'Challa convinces him to don the White Tiger suit one last time in order to stop Cardiac and Vanisher, the latter of whom has been smuggling stolen vibranium out of Wakanda. Later, T'Challa unveils a new costume for Kasper and says that he wants to train him properly to become a hero again, not as White Tiger or Black Panther, but in a new identity altogether.

Kevin "Kasper" Cole is depicted as biracial, the child of an African man and a Jewish woman. As a result of the sharp contrast between his light skin and the dark skin of his father, he has been nicknamed Kasper, after Casper the Friendly Ghost. Aspects of his heritage and the colour of his skin are frequently referenced in Black Panther and The Crew. Initially, Kasper Cole was to be modelled after actor Vin Diesel, an idea suggested by artist Oscar Jimenez. Language and culture barriers, as Priest describes it, precluded this suggestion from being properly translated to Jorge Lucas, who ended up as the penciller of the Black Panther title.

Kasper Cole was initially non-powered, wearing only the Black Panther's outfit for protection and carrying a pair of 9×19mm pistols (later loaded with non-lethal gel bullets). Later on, after ingesting a synthetic version of the herbs that give the original Black Panther his powers, he possesses peak human physical strength, speed, reflexes and reactions, agility and durability, superhuman eyesight, and night vision.

The suit Kasper wears as the Black Panther and later as the White Tiger is a vibranium microweave body suit capable of dissipating the kinetic and hydrostatic shock damage of bullets or bullet-like objects, essentially making it bullet-proof. It also has special vibranium soled boots for scaling vertical surfaces. Kasper also carries energy based throwing daggers capable of paralyzing or tagging his enemies. He can track those tagged via an advanced pocket computer (which also has numerous other capabilities), a Kimiyo Card.

== Wicked ==
Wicked is a character appearing in American comic books published by Marvel Comics. Wicked first appeared in Excalibur (vol. 3) #1 (May, 2004) and was created by Chris Claremont and Aaron Lopresti. Wicked is a mutant with the ability to summon ghosts through their residual energies, allowing them to communicate with others and do her bidding.

Wicked is one of the few survivors of the Wild Sentinel attack on Genosha's capital Hammer Bay. Right before the attack she had a fight with her mother about her gothic fashion. Her mother shouts that she was wicked, right before their house was destroyed by the Sentinels. She somehow survives and she is next seen following Charles Xavier as he treks through the island. She confronts Xavier, angered by his X-Men's failure to protect the mutants of Genosha. The two are confronted by Unus the Untouchable and his men. With the assistances of Wicked's friend Freakshow, the confrontation is stalled. Freakshow and Wicked agree to be Xavier's students. Later on that day, Wicked saves Magneto, believed to be dead but in reality hiding on the island, from Callisto, who Storm had sent to keep an eye on Xavier. When Callisto battles Wicked's spirits, it was discovered that when the ghosts were hurt Wicked feels the pain instead.

With these members and the later additions of Shola Inkosi and Karima Shapandar they form a team with the mission of rebuilding the island of Genosha and finding survivors. They successfully find a gray skinned mutant named Broadband, with the power to tap into all forms of electronic communications and project them to others, Book, a former librarian with a vast repository of knowledge, and the unwilling ally Dark Beast. Around this time, Wicked and Freakshow also endure an attack/search and rescue mission by former Genoshan Magistrates (the ex-police force of the island). Everyone gets in on the battle and the two eventually subdue some of the attackers themselves.

Since the events of the House of M and the conclusion in Decimation it was seen that Wicked was among the depowered, as well as the rest of the Excalibur (vol. 3) cast in the Son of M miniseries. Desperate to gain her powers back, she took a huff of the Terrigen Mists Quicksilver was offering and regained her powers. However, with her powers enhanced by the Mists, she was encountered by the spirits of her deceased parents, who condemned her, saying she had left them to die, and that she was a "nasty, selfish little tramp", until she made them go away. She was later taken to a hospital with the other refugees, and the effects of the Mists wore off, leaving her powerless once more.

Through unknown means, Wicked regained her powers and appeared on Genosha. When interacting with Kitty Pryde during the Hannukah season, Wicked summoned the ghost of Kitty's father Carmine.

== Wild Thing ==
Wild Thing (Rina Logan) is a mutant character in the alternate future MC2, daughter of Elektra and Wolverine. Created by Tom DeFalco and Ron Lim, the character first appeared in J2 #5 (February 1999). She had her own series for a time, but due to low sales it was canceled after issue #5.

For a short period of time, Wild Thing is a member of a superhero team composed of herself, Magneta, and Daze, but she quits when Magneta becomes villainous. When Loki kidnaps several of Earth's heroes (including her father), Wild Thing's enhanced senses are pivotal in finding them.

Rina possesses many of her father's mutant abilities, including accelerated healing and superhuman senses, strength, reflexes and endurance. She also has a set of "Psi-Claws", created from psychokinetic energy, which, although they appear similar to her father's adamantium claws, usually inflict damage on a mental rather than a physical level. However, if she concentrates hard enough, her claws can actually slice through steel and stone. Her fighting skills are impressive, as her parents have trained her in martial arts. Her skills are sufficient to enable her to engage J2 in hand-to-hand combat and hold her own, despite the advantages his much greater strength provides him.

== Wildside ==
Wildside (Richard Gill) is a character appearing in American comic books published by Marvel Comics. The character, created by Louise Simonson and Rob Liefeld, first appeared in New Mutants #86 (December 1989).

Wildside is a mutant and a founding member of the Mutant Liberation Front (MLF) who possesses the ability to induce hallucinations. He was among the mutants depowered during the "Decimation" storyline. In the series X-Men Blue, Wildside regains his powers after being exposed to Mothervine, a drug designed to trigger mutant abilities. In addition, he gains the ability to manifest the hallucinations he induces into reality.

== Martha Williams ==
Martha Williams is a character appearing in American comic books published by Marvel Comics. The character, created by Steve Englehart, first appeared in West Coast Avengers vol. 2 #2 (July 1985). Martha is the mother of Simon Williams / Wonder Man and Eric Williams / Grim Reaper.

=== Martha Williams in other media ===
Martha Williams appears in the Disney+ series Wonder Man (2026), portrayed by Shola Adewusi.

== Reese Williams ==
Reese Williams is a character appearing in American comic books published by Marvel Comics. She first appears in Moon Knight (Vol. 9) #1 (July, 2021) and was created by Jed MacKay and Alessandro Cappuccio. Reese has the abilities of superhuman speed, regeneration, immortality and the ability to turn into mist.

Reese lived in Manhattan when she was turned into a vampire by the Structure, a vampiric cult. She was forced by the cult to create more vampires, where she was almost killed by Moon Knight until she explained the situation. She began work as Moon Knight's receptionist. Reese, alongside Soldier, would later be ambushed by Zodiac. Zodiac shot a bullet through Reese into Soldier, killing Soldier before being infected with Reese's chunk of heart and turned into a vampire.

After the death of Moon Knight, Reese took over the Midnight Mission organization.

== Sanford Williams ==
Sanford Williams is a character appearing in American comic books published by Marvel Comics. The character, created by writer Steve Englehart and artist Al Milgrom, first appeared in West Coast Avengers vol. 2 #2 (July 1985).

Williams is the father of Simon Williams / Wonder Man and Eric Williams / Grim Reaper.

=== Sanford Williams in other media ===
Sanford Williams appears in Wonder Man (2026), portrayed by Béchir Sylvain.

== Verity Willis ==
Verity Willis is a character appearing in American comic books published by Marvel Comics.

Verity Willis is a doctor with the ability to detect lies, and a friend of Loki.

=== Verity Willis in other media ===
Verity Willis appears in Loki and Deadpool & Wolverine as the original identity of Hunter B-15 (portrayed by Wunmi Mosaku).

== Willow ==
Willow is a mutant character created by Marvel Comics for their Marvel 2099 run X-Nation 2099. This short-lived series only lasted six issues before ending. Willow can perfectly mimic the shape of other beings, although her facial markings remain prevalent.

In the year 2099, a young girl named Winter Frost gets a job at a local amusement park, Million Palms Amusement Park, which is actually presided over by a king and a queen. One day Queen Perigrine disappears, and her body is found at the bottom of the Tunnel of Love. King Avian becomes suspicious of everyone and requires genetic scans of all incoming tourists before they can enter. Anyone with genetic anomalies is imprisoned in an underground labyrinth and subjected to many tests and acts of torture.

Winter is discovered to be a mutant and is imprisoned. Among the other inmates is a tormented girl named Willow. The two girls became friends, but Willow os taken away by Avian. Winter tries to escape to save her friend, but is discovered. For her actions she is sentenced to public execution. When she is taken to be executed, she sees the missing queen, who is revealed to be Willow using her shapeshifter abilities. Willow orchestrates her and Winter's escape from the facility. The pair arrive at Halo City, the home of X-Nation, and join the group. They move into a home for indigent children which is maintained by the 'Sisterhood of the Howling Commandos'.

== Darlene Wilson ==
Darlene Wilson is a character appearing in American comic books published by Marvel Comics. She first appeared in Captain America #277 (October 1982), and created by J.M. DeMatteis and Mike Zeck.

Darlene Wilson is the mother of Sam Wilson / Falcon and Sarah Wilson. Darlene was supportive to different religions and comparative theology. Darlene is later shot and killed by a mugger.

=== Darlene Wilson in other media ===
Darlene Wilson appears in the Avengers Assemble episode "One Little Thing", voiced by Cree Summer.

== Paul Wilson ==
Paul Wilson is a character appearing in Marvel Comics. He first appeared in Captain America #277 (October 1982), and was created by J.M. DeMatteis and Mike Zeck.

Paul was a minister who is the father of Sam Wilson and Sarah Wilson. He was later killed trying to break up a neighborhood fight.

== Sarah Wilson ==
Sarah Wilson is a character appearing in Marvel Comics. The character first appeared in Captain America #134 (February 1971), and created by J.M. DeMatteis and Mike Zeck.

She is the sister of Sam Wilson / Falcon. Sarah is shown as supportive of her brother's personal problems as she went through similar things as well.

=== Sarah Wilson in other media ===
Sarah Wilson appears in The Falcon and the Winter Soldier, portrayed by Adepero Oduye.

== Windshear ==
Windshear (Colin Ashworth Hume) is a mutant superhero and member of Alpha Flight. Created by Fabian Nicieza and Michael Bair, the character first appeared in Alpha Flight #87 (April 1991). He has the ability to project "hard-air" molecules, which he can use to create constructs, release as concussive force, and propel himself in flight. He was born in Canada, but grew up in Britain.

Hume was hired by Roxxon Oil Corp and given a battlesuit that allowed him to control his powers more thoroughly. When he was unable to defeat a machine-creature at Roxxon's Denver Energy Research station, the company called in Box and Diamond Lil. The trio and Forge discovered James MacDonald Hudson at the machine's core. Hume, upset about Roxxon's practices, quit the company and returned to Canada with the members of Alpha Flight, and was soon accepted onto the team, first on a probationary basis and later as a full member. He was later appointed the Chief Administrator of Alpha Flight.

Eventually, the Canadian government disbands Department H and the Flight programs, and Hume returns to England. Hume set up a curio shop to sell "hard air" constructs.

He is among those depowered by M-Day, but continues to fight crime in Toronto under the alias Chinook.

== Wing ==
Wing is the name of several characters appearing in American comic books published by Marvel Comics.

=== Chaste member ===
Wing is a member of the Chaste who can levitate and is an expert martial artist.

=== Edward Tancredi ===
Edward Tancredi is a construction worker with the mutant ability of self-propelled flight. He becomes a student at the X-Mansion under the codename Wing and joins the Paladins, a group advised by Shadowcat. Wing later loses his powers to Ord's mutant cure and is convinced to commit suicide by Danger.

When the X-Men settle on Krakoa, Wing is among the mutants who are resurrected by the Five.

=== Wing in other media ===
The Edward Tancredi incarnation of Wing appears in X-Men '97, voiced by Christopher Barger.

== Norah Winters ==
Norah Winters is a supporting character of Spider-Man. Created by Joe Kelly and Chris Bachalo, the character first appeared in The Amazing Spider-Man #575.

Norah Winters is a reporter for the Daily Bugle. She has worked with Peter Parker on numerous occasions.

Winters was romantically involved with Randy Robertson for a time, but the latter breaks up with her when she puts her career above anything else, staying on the sidelines to film Robertson fighting the Hobgoblin when she had access to a bag of the Goblin's pumpkin bombs. She soon starts dating Phil Urich, who was secretly the Hobgoblin and had plotted her and Robertson's breakup. Winters is fired after Urich's villain identity is revealed in a television broadcast.

== Romany Wisdom ==
Romany Wisdom

Publication information
- Publisher: Marvel Comics
- First appearance: Pryde and Wisdom #2 (October 1996)
- Created by: Warren Ellis (writer); Terry Dodson (artist)

In-story information
- Supporting character of: Pete Wisdom

Romany Wisdom is a character appearing in American comic books published by Marvel Comics. She first appeared in Pryde and Wisdom #2 (October 1996), and was created by Warren Ellis and Terry Dodson.

Romany Wisdom is the sister to X-Men ally Pete Wisdom, and a former agent of the Royal Metropolitan Police's Department of Unusual Death (Department F.66). Born in England, nothing is known about Romany's childhood after her mother is killed, as she had cut ties with her family. Following those years, Romany meets and falls in love with Joseph Chapman, aka the third Union Jack. They break up under vague circumstances, but remain friends. She continues to help Jack during his super-hero adventures, whenever her expertise is needed. She is an obsessed history fanatic, and knows much about ancient cultures, even such secret races as vampires.

In order to make headway in a murder investigation, Pete is forced to contact his estranged family - visiting his borderline-senile father, Harold, to get a professional profiling on the killer, and his sister, Romany, who can translate the symbols on the bodies. With Romany's help, they determine that the murderer believes himself to be Cain, son of Adam, and is composing a letter directly to God on the corpses he has left behind, asking for forgiveness and to be allowed admittance into heaven. Ascertaining the killer's identity as John Gideon, a deranged officer from Department F.66, they track him down just as he makes contact with Amanda Jardine and just after Harold Wisdom had taken it upon himself to hunt down Gideon.

Later, Romany is revealed to have been transformed into the cyborg leader of a secret global conspiracy, which in her words is "so high up that they may as well be the right hand of God", which conducts clandestine experiments with human beings using alien technology in order to create parts to build a techno-organic world engine. She has yet to be seen since then, and is presumed to have died after her brother's particular incarnation of X-Force destroyed the entire facility in England, though she has stated that no matter what happened, "the work would always continue".

== Witchfire ==
Witchfire (Ananym) is a character appearing in American comic books published by Marvel Comics. The character is depicted as a former superhero, now supervillain, and magician.

Witchfire was a former member of Gamma Flight and was eventually recruited into Beta Flight. She is the daughter of X-Men villain Belasco.

== Wither ==
Wither

Publication information
- Publisher: Marvel Comics
- First appearance: New Mutants (vol. 2) #3 (September 2003)
- Created by: Nunzio DeFilippis; Christina Weir; Keron Grant

In-story information
- Alter ego: Kevin Ford
- Species: Human mutant
- Team affiliations: Hellions training squad New Mutants training squad Xavier Institute
- Partnerships: Selene
- Abilities: Disintegration

Wither (Kevin Ford) is a character appearing in American comic books published by Marvel Comics. He is a mutant as well as a member of the student body at the Xavier Institute, a member of the Hellions training squad, and a supervillain as a part of Selene's Coven.

When Kevin Ford's powers first manifested, he panicked. His father tried to calm him down, but Kevin's power reduced him to dust. A talented artist, Kevin lives in a scrap yard and turns unwanted scrap into beautiful art. He is found by Danielle Moonstar and brought to the Xavier Institute, where he begins to develop friendships with Laurie Collins, David Alleyne, and Sofia Mantega. When Donald Pierce attacks them and impales Laurie, Kevin lashes out and uses his power on Pierce. To stop him from killing Pierce, Moonstar shows him his worst fear - using his power on an innocent person. Frightened by the physiological pleasure he experienced when using his power on Pierce, he leaves the institute.

Some months later Emma Frost persuades him to return, and he joins the New Mutants squad under the codename Wither. Clashing with Elixir, the current object of Laurie's affections, Mercury of the Hellions reaches out to him, having developed a crush on him. He is arrested by the FBI for killing his father. While the Hellions try to rescue him, the New Mutants stop them, fearing the consequences of involving the Institute in a fight with the FBI. Kevin sees this as a betrayal, and he switches to the Hellions squad. He discovers Elixir's former relationship with Wolfsbane and reveals it to the school, successfully ending Josh's relationship with Laurie.

Kevin spends some time vacationing with the Hellions squad. They get caught up with the powerful 'Kingmaker' who grants people their wishes in return for favors later. Kevin spends some time without his powers due to drugs supplied by their new ally. However, once the Hellions discover the favor is stealing a biological weapon, they rebel. Kevin loses access to the drugs. He uses his powers to destroy the weapon. After M-Day, Kevin believes he has lost his powers like most of the mutant population. When he touches Laurie's hand, however, it withers. After a session in David Alleyne's Danger Cave, Kevin overhears Julian Keller referring to him as "dangerous." Kevin again runs away from the institute, unaware that Julian also wanted to help him.

Kevin goes to Mutant Town, and lives in the company of Selene, in disguise as an old lady. After seeing Selene shot by the police, he kills two policemen in a rage. Wither and Selene embrace as Kevin accepts Selene's offer to be her "king" as they fade away, presumably to Selene's dimension. Wither lives a life of luxury with Selene, but he still has feelings for Laurie and because of this is still reluctant to use his powers. Using illusions of Elixir and Laurie, Selene is able to get him to renounce these inhibitions.

Wither is among Selene's Inner Circle, dispatched to retrieve Selene's mystical knife from the X-Men. During the resulting fight, he is distracted by Dust, her transient form proving difficult for him to affect. When Onyxx attacks him, Wither uses his powers to disintegrate his body, killing him instantly. During a quarrel with Eli Bard, Wither transforms, revealing that Selene has used her powers to make him an immortal vampire, much like Bard. Bard is killed immediately after their argument by Selene herself. Elixir and Wither face against one another, with Elixir reluctantly killing Wither by disintegrating his body.

Years later, Wither resurfaces in the newly founded mutant nation of Krakoa, having been presumably resurrected by the Five.

=== Powers and abilities of Wither ===
Wither decays, and eventually disintegrates, organic matter by touch—a power which is involuntary. With extended contact he would reduce almost anything—or anyone—organic to dust. As a result of his power, he is only able to wear clothing made of synthetic textiles. This power is even more difficult to deal with due to Kevin's self-styled interpretation that his ability wants him to use it. It has a "hunger", which gives Kevin a desire to use it, though this could just be a psychological aspect of his power. He is also sometimes shown to see things in their decayed form, such as live pigeons appearing to be decayed through his eyes. During a later confrontation with Eli Bard, Wither shows also that he can transform into a vampire-like being, due to Selene's manipulation.

== Wiz Kid ==
Wiz Kid (Takeshi 'Taki' Matsuya) is a mutant character appearing in X-Men related titles. The character was created by Louise Simonson and Jon Bogdanove, and first appeared in X-Terminators #1 (June 1988). Wiz Kid has the power of technokinesis and can manipulate and rearrange machinery with his mind. He tends to use this ability on his own wheelchair, giving it various forms and functions.

Takeshi Matsuya was orphaned at a young age when his parents died in a car crash, which also resulted in him becoming paraplegic. He befriends the young mutants Leech and Artie Maddicks at his school. During the Inferno event, the three boys are kidnapped by N'astirh's demons to be used in a ritual and N'astirh uses Taki to build him a supercomputer to increase his own abilities. Taki then helps the New Mutants and the X-Terminators defeat the demons.

Taki retains his powers after the Decimation, but lists himself as depowered on the S.H.I.E.L.D database.

Taki goes on to join Avengers Academy.

During the Krakoan Age, Taki joins S.W.O.R.D.'s mutant team, the Six, as the 'Control' while making use of Professor X's old hoverchair. After Abigail Brand is discovered to be a traitor for Orchis and Henry Peter Gyrich discovered to be a triple agent, Taki joins the X-Corps, maintaining their base with Trinary. The two keep X-Corps Island cloaked from Orchis.

=== Wiz Kid in other media ===
Wiz Kid appears in the X-Men: The Animated Series episode "No Mutant Is an Island".

== Wolf Cub ==
Wolf Cub (Nicholas Gleason) is a character created by Brian K. Vaughan and Lee Ferguson. He first appeared in Chamber #1.

Gleason possesses a wolf-like appearance as well as enhanced senses, strength, speed, agility, reflexes, coordination, balance and endurance. After the deaths of his parents, Gleason is targeted by anti-mutant assassins. He is rescued by X-Men members Chamber and Cyclops, and subsequently enrolled at the Xavier Institute. After accidentally injuring Havok, he runs away from the Institute and is invited to join a group called Dominant Species by Maximus Lobo. He declines, and later rejoins the school as a member of the Paragons training squad.

In the wake of House of M, most mutants lost their powers, with Wolf Cub being one of the few students to retain their powers. He is recruited to the Young X-Men after Cyclops intervenes in his attempts to kill Maximus Lobo as revenge for his manipulation of Wolf Cub. The team battles Donald Pierce, during which Wolf Cub is killed. Long after his death, he is resurrected by the Five following the establishment of Krakoa as a mutant nation.

== Wolf Spider ==
Wolf Spider is an alias used by several characters appearing in American comic books published by Marvel Comics.

=== Niko Constantin ===
Niko Constantin was an assassin who is imprisoned in a gulag (alongside Boris Bullski and Unicorn). He assumes the name of Wolf Spider after joining the Wolf Spiders, a special ops team trained by the Red Room.

=== Wolf Spider in other media ===
An original incarnation of Wolf Spider appears in the Ultimate Spider-Man four-part episode "Return to the Spider-Verse", voiced by Christopher Daniel Barnes. This version is a villainous alternate universe version of Peter Parker who possesses organic, spider leg-like appendages.

== Woodgod ==
Woodgod is a character appearing in American comic books published by Marvel Comics.

Woodgod was created by two scientists, David and Ellen Pace, on their farm in New Mexico, possessing a Satyr-like shape as the result of a gene-splicing experiment that involved human DNA and animal DNA. They also had been working with nerve gas for the federal government. When people from the nearby town of Liberty, New Mexico, discovered Woodgod they stormed the farm and shot him. One of the townspeople smashed a canister of the lethal nerve gas within the barn, killing the Paces and everyone in Liberty. When Col. Del Tremens and the U.S. Army came to investigate what happened in Liberty, they found and battled Woodgod (who was immune to the gas) and quarantined the empty town.

Woodgod escaped and returned to the Pace farm, using David Pace's notes to teach himself how to read. Using Pace's notebooks and equipment, Woodgod began genetic experiments using the methods he had discovered and created the sentient half-humanoid half-animals of human intelligence that he called the Changelings. He resisted a coup by the murderous Changeling Leoninus. He soon left the Pace farm and found a valley in the Colorado Rocky Mountains, where he established a community for the Changelings, and became the Lawgiver of the Changelings.

== Warren Worthington II ==
Warren Worthington II, also known as Warren Worthington Jr., is a character appearing in American comic books within Marvel Comics. The character was created by Stan Lee and Jack Kirby, and first appeared in X-Men #14 (September 1965). He is the father of Warren Worthington III / Angel / Archangel and the CEO of Worthington Industries.

As a member of the Hellfire Club, Worthington has interacted with Howard Stark, John Braddock, and Sebastian Shaw. Warren's diamond-smuggling brother Burt Worthington (who operated as Dazzler) sent agents to kill him.

=== Warren Worthington II in other media ===
- Warren Worthington appears in X-Men: The Last Stand, portrayed by Michael Murphy.
- Warren Worthington appears in Wolverine and the X-Men, voiced by Jim Ward.

== Wraith ==
Wraith is the name of several characters appearing in American comic books published by Marvel Comics.

=== Hector Rendoza ===
Hector Rendoza (Wraith) is a mutant character that debuted in The Uncanny X-Men #392 (April 2001) by Scott Lobdell and Salvador Larroca. Wraith is a mutant with transparent skin (a state he cannot control, but can pass to others) that was recruited by Jean Grey to join her Genoshan Assault X-Men. He lost his powers following the Decimation.

== Wrongslide ==
Wrongslide is a character appearing in American comic books published by Marvel Comics.

When the High Summoner of Arakko betrayed and killed Rockslide in Otherworld, the Five of Krakoa attempted to revive him. Unfortunately, they created an amalgamated clone of his multiversal variants as a side effect of him being killed in Otherworld. Wrongslide later entered X-Factor's custody. He sacrifices himself to replenish Krakoa by giving up his energy.

== The Wu ==
The Wu (Alice Gulliver) is a character appearing in American comic books from Marvel Comics. The character, created by James Robinson and Mike Perkins, first appeared in Doctor Strange: Last Days of Magic (April 2016).

Alice Gulliver is the daughter of Hong Kong's mystic guardian, The August Wu of the Coral Shore, and a human police officer father, Adam Gulliver. She met Doctor Strange when he came to aid The August Wu on a case. Sometime later, The August Wu was killed by a demon, resulting in Alice's black hair suddenly turning a shade of coral red, just like her mother's. Growing up, she became a police officer like her father while also battling demonic entities under the name The Wu.

Alice inherited magical affinity from her mother. In order to maintain a low profile, she rarely uses magic directly and instead imbueds her weaponry with hexes and spells that are invisible to normal eyes.

=== The Wu in other media ===
The Wu, renamed Alice Wu-Gulliver, appears in Agatha All Along, portrayed by Ali Ahn. This version is an ex-police officer and security guard whose mother Lorna was a famous singer and witch who was widely rumoured to having been lost to the Witch's Road. Additionally, Alice is portrayed with having black hair with red highlights. Alice joins Agatha Harkness's coven to walk the Witches' Road, suggesting that she might learn the truth of what happened to her mother. At the end of the third trial, Alice dies after her magic is absorbed by the possessed Harkness and her soul is claimed by Rio Vidal / Death.

== Leiko Wu ==
- Further reading: Leiko Wu at the Comic Book DB (archived from the original); Leiko Wu at the Grand Comics Database

Leiko Wu is a character appearing in Marvel Comics. The character, created by Doug Moench and Paul Gulacy, first appeared in Master of Kung Fu #33 (October 1975).

Leiko Wu is a British Chinese MI-6 agent. Upon joining, she entered a romantic relationship with Clive Reston, but she left him for Simon Bretnor, who later became the villain Mordillo. She soon joined back up with Reston along with his new allies Black Jack Tarr and Shang-Chi, the latter of whom she developed feelings for. Together, they defeated Mordillo. She continued to go on several missions with Shang-Chi and Reston which would usually cause awkward tension among them. Wu would also help Shang-Chi defeat his father, Fu Manchu, on a couple of occasions.

Sometime after her relationship with Shang-Chi ended, Leiko is murdered by Razor Fist while working undercover in the triads for MI-6. Leiko's murder prompts Shang-Chi to return to London, where he reunites with Tarr and his former enemy Skull Crusher, who alleges that Leiko planned to defect MI-6 for him. When Razor Fist's employer is revealed to be White Dragon, Skull-Crusher's rival triad clan leader, Shang-Chi and Skull-Crusher arrive at White Dragon's estate, but are captured by Shang-Chi's brother Midnight Sun, White Dragon's master. Midnight Sun decapitates White Dragon and Skull-Crusher for the Mao Shan Pai ritual, which requires the heads of the triad leaders. Instead of granting him the powers that the ritual would grant him, the spell instead resurrects Leiko due to Skull-Crusher secretly making her the leader of his clan before her death. Leiko uses her newfound powers to main Razor Fist and summons the spirits of the dead triad leaders to drag Midnight Sun back to their realm. Shang-Chi is unable to bring his former lover back to her normal self and she flees when Tarr arrives at the estate with backup. Leiko is later seen taking a photo that Shang-Chi leaves behind at her grave of the two of them.

Leiko eventually resumes her duties with MI-6. When MI-6 discovers that Zheng Zu's (Fu Manchu's real identity) organization is active again, Leiko visits Shang-Chi at his new residence in San Francisco to warn him, only for the two to be attacked by unknown assailants. The two are rescued by Shang-Chi's previously unknown half-siblings, Brother Sabre and Sister Dagger, who reveal that Shang-Chi has been chosen by Zheng Zu's spirit as the new Supreme Commander of the Five Weapons Society, the true name of their father's organization. Sabre and Dagger request Shang-Chi's help in overthrowing Sister Hammer, the illegitimate leader of the Society and his long-lost full sister, Shi-Hua, who sent the assassins to kill her brother in order to consolidate her rule.

== Wyre ==
Wyre is a character appearing in American comic books published by Marvel Comics. He first appeared in Alpha Flight #114 (September 1992) and was created by Simon Furman and Pat Broderick. Wyre has the ability to project and control tendrils of inorganic fiber from his body which obey his mental commands. He has hyper-regenerative powers and athletic abilities, including super-strength and speed. Wyre is also an expert with various forms of weaponry, as well as unarmed combat.

Initially a member of Secret Empire, Wyre later joined Alpha Flight. Sometime after the end of the Krakoan Age, Wyre resurfaces as a member of 3K.
