= Peter Glanz =

Peter Glanz may refer to:

- Peter Glanz (filmmaker) (born 1983), British-American writer and director
- Peter Glanz (motorcyclist) (born 1962), Danish former motorcycle speedway rider
