= Thaddeus Ross (Marvel Cinematic Universe) =

Character in the Marvel Cinematic Universe

- Marvel Cinematic Universe character
- William Hurt (top) and Harrison Ford (bottom) as Thaddeus Ross in Captain America: Civil War (2016) and Captain America: Brave New World (2025) respectively.
- First appearance: The Incredible Hulk (2008)
- Based on: Thunderbolt Ross by: Stan Lee; Jack Kirby
- Adapted by: Zak Penn
- Portrayed by: William Hurt (2008–2021); Harrison Ford (2025)
- Voiced by: Michael Patrick McGill (What If...?); Travis Willingham (Your Friendly Neighborhood Spider-Man)

In-universe information
- Full name: Thaddeus Ross
- Alias: Red Hulk
- Nicknames: Thunderbolt; Hulk Hunter
- Species: Human mutate
- Titles: Lieutenant General; Secretary of State; President of the United States
- Children: Betty Ross (daughter)
- Nationality: American

Thaddeus Ross is a fictional character portrayed by both William Hurt and Harrison Ford in the Marvel Cinematic Universe (MCU) film franchise, based on the Marvel Comics character of the same name. He is depicted as a United States Armed Forces lieutenant general before serving as Secretary of State, and is later elected as the President of the United States. He is also the father of Betty Ross, with whom he has had a complex relationship.

Ross leads the manhunt for Bruce Banner and inadvertently helps create the Abomination. After retiring from the military and various health issues, Ross serves as Secretary of State, and presents the Avengers with the Sokovia Accords leading to their disbandment. After being revived from the Blip, Ross is elected president which puts him at odds with Sam Wilson. Ross turns into a Red Hulk after ingesting gamma-radiated pills from a revenge-driven Samuel Sterns, which leads to him destroying the White House. He later stands down as president and is incarcerated in the Raft.

Hurt portrayed Ross in The Incredible Hulk (2008), The Consultant (2011), Captain America: Civil War (2016), Avengers: Infinity War (2018), Avengers: Endgame (2019) and Black Widow (2021). After Hurt's death in 2022, Ford subsequently portrayed the character in Captain America: Brave New World (2025). Both actors received generally positive reviews for their performances and the gravitas they brought to the role. Alternate versions of the character appear in various Disney+ animated series, voiced by both Michael Patrick McGill and Travis Willingham.

== Development and casting ==
In late 2006, Marvel Studios announced on their website that their next project would be a reboot of Hulk (2003), set for release in 2008. By June 2007, American actor William Hurt was cast to play the comic character Thaddeus "Thunderbolt" Ross in the film, eventually titled The Incredible Hulk (2008). The Hollywood Reporter reported that movie would see Ross dedicating his life to capturing the Hulk, who was set to be played by American actor Edward Norton. Sam Elliott, who portrayed Ross in the 2003 film, expressed disappointment at being replaced stating he wished Marvel would "have considered using some of the 2003 cast". Despite this, he praised the new cast and added that he approved of Hurt's casting.

Hurt died on March 13, 2022. Producer Nate Moore noted that there were always plans to turn Ross into his comic counterpart Red Hulk, which was told to Hurt prior to his death and reportedly excited him. After Hurt's death, Moore noted that Marvel began to reevaluate how to proceed with Ross's story or come up with a new plot until American actor Harrison Ford reached out to Kevin Feige about potentially appearing in a Marvel film. The role was announced to be recast in October 2022, with Ford replacing Hurt. In an interview with Entertainment Weekly, Ford called the idea of replacing Hurt a "daunting prospect", adding that it's a "delicate thing to think about, stepping into the shoes of someone else that has played a character so successfully and so treasured by the Marvel universe [...] I had the emotional opportunities to continue what he had done and bring it to some kind of conclusion".

== Characterization ==
=== Depictions and appearances ===
The character, played by William Hurt, first appeared in the Marvel Cinematic Universe (MCU) film The Incredible Hulk (2008) as a high-ranking military officer who was obsessed with recreating the serum that gave Steve Rogers his abilities. Scientist Dr. Bruce Banner uses gamma radiation to try to achieve results, which accidentally transforms him into a monster nicknamed the Hulk. Screen Rant writer Richard Craig noted that Ross saw the Hulk as a "potential weapon". Ross is portrayed as one of the film's antagonists hunting Banner down, and later recruits British Royal Marine Emil Blonsky to take an alternate version of Banner's serum which turns him into the Abomination. Hurt described Ross as complicated and conflicted, saying that he wants "Hulk's power, but is humiliated by Hulk's conscience: he actually sees and recognizes that it's more developed than his own, even though he's a patriot and a warrior for his country. He's sacrificed enormously for that purpose, but at the expense at times of his humanity which he occasionally recovers". Hurt later reprised his role for the Marvel One-Shot The Consultant (2011) via archival footage from the final scene of The Incredible Hulk. On sharing the scene with Robert Downey Jr's Tony Stark, he felt Marvel had "a lot of guts" to crossover films.

After eight years, Hurt next appeared as Ross in Captain America: Civil War (2016). On his role, Hurt called it "a completely new iteration", describing Ross as more mature and less like the comic book version he had incorporated and embodied in The Incredible Hulk. The film saw Ross transitioning from a military officer into politics, becoming the United States Secretary of State, and presenting the Avengers with the Sokovia Accords, a legislation designed to regulate superheroes. Ross's crackdown on the Avengers lead to a rift between Steve Rogers and Tony Stark and the subsequent breaking apart of the team. Director Joe Russo noted that Red Hulk was considered for the movie, but was decided against due to the excess amount of characters in the narrative. In 2017, director James Gunn expressed interest in making a film featuring both Hulk and Red Hulk, but due to conflicts with Universal Pictures over film rights, the film never project never entered development. Ross's appointment as Secretary of State was covered in the second season of the faux digital series WHIH Newsfront (2016) as promotion for Civil War, and he was also mentioned in Agents of S.H.I.E.L.D.: Slingshot (2016).

Hurt went on to reprise the role in Avengers: Infinity War (2018) and Avengers: Endgame (2019). The former saw him enforcing the Accords on James Rhodes, while the latter saw him attending Tony Stark's funeral after falling victim to the Blip. Screenwriter Christopher Markus also stated that the writers briefly considered bringing Ross as Red Hulk in Endgame. Hurt appeared as Ross in Black Widow (2021) (Note: Set after the events of Captain America: Civil War (2016) and before the events of Avengers: Infinity War (2018).) which saw the character pursuing Natasha Romanoff for violating the Accords. On his character, Hurt noted that there was a "fatigue setting" in Ross after trying to control the Avengers, adding that Ross "imagined, back when he was contending with Hulk, that he was the conquering soldier going around the world, but things have gotten more complex and difficult". Despite this, Hurt felt that the character still had a "sense of dignity" but that "he's the soldier on the last hill at this point".

In Captain America: Brave New World (2025), Ross, now played by Harrison Ford after Hurt's death, has been elected the President of the United States (POTUS). During the film, he clashes with the new Captain America, Sam Wilson, after an assassination attempt made on Ross by a mind-controlled Isaiah Bradley. The assassination attempt causes political tension between Ross and Ozaki, the Prime Minister of Japan, and threatens Ross's international treaty to mine and distribute Adamantium to the world. Ross becomes the Red Hulk after ingesting gamma pills given to him by Samuel Sterns. (Note: This was due to Ross scapegoating Sterns as the mastermind behind the events of The Incredible Hulk (2008), and false promising him a pardon in exchange for advanced weapons and strategies to further advance his career.) As the Red Hulk, Ross destroys the White House, fights Captain America (who talks and calms him down), and is later imprisoned in the superhuman prison, the Raft. People writer Rebecca Aizin called the situation "ironic" as Ross was locked in the same prison that he locked up Roger's allies in Civil War. Additionally in the film, Ross's security advisor, Ruth Bat-Seraph is a former Black Widow assassin, in which Collider writer Gregory Mysogland noted that this implied Ross "helped neutralize the Red Room after [Romanoff] publicly exposed it and freed the other Widows", which "explains how he and [Bat-Seraph] joined forces". Ford hoped he could play the character again, saying that there is a "story in which he can develop into something other than the Red Hulk. I think we have the capacity to shift shape between Hulkness and humanity [...] I was very happy with the opportunity to play in this playground".

In 2022, there were conflicting reports about Ford being set to reprise his role in Thunderbolts* (2025), with The Hollywood Reporter reporting that he would, while Variety reported that he would not. By 2024, various media outlets suggested that Ford would not be appearing the film. (Note: As suggested by Entertainment Weekly, and Esquire.) While Ross did not appear in the film's final script, Ross's rampage as Red Hulk was cited by Valentina Allegra de Fontaine during a hearing about her involvement in O.X.E's "Sentry" project, as a reason for the need of more super-powered individuals. After the film's release, writer Eric Pearson noted in an interview that early versions of his script included Ross's Red Hulk as the villain, but was cut out due to Marvel's plans for the character in Brave New World.

=== Relationship with Betty ===
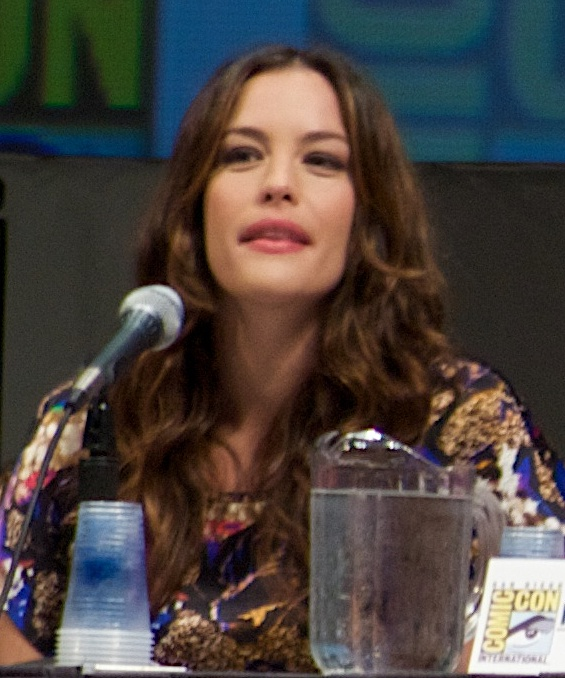
Ross's daughter Betty Ross is portrayed by American actress Liv Tyler

In The Incredible Hulk, Ross's daughter, Dr. Elizabeth "Betty" Ross, helped create the primer that allowed Bruce Banner to "absorb gamma radiation" which ultimately turned him into the Hulk. After Banner's transformation, Ross's character arc focuses on him chasing the Hulk, which puts him at odds with Betty as she is in love with Banner. Betty opposes her father which causes friction and tension between the two, and they subsequently become estranged. Betty's actress, Liv Tyler, noted that Ross and Betty have "had a very painful and difficult relationship. She doesn't speak to him because he kind of destroyed her life".

Throughout Captain America: Brave New World, Ross is shown trying to reconnect with Betty, now his estranged daughter. Their relationship was described as the heart of the film, with director Julius Onah explaining that Betty represented a "human side" to Ross. The biggest motivating factor for Ross becoming president was seeking reconciliation with Betty, as it was Ross proving to her that he had "turned a new leaf". Talking on The Official Marvel Podcast, Onah noted that in the film, the relationship between Ross and Betty is also a large part of the former simultaneously "trying to cement his legacy" and redefine his identity as both a person and a leader. Cherry blossoms serve as a recurring motif in the film symbolizing Ross and Betty's father-daughter bond, recalling their visits to the Tidal Basin cherry blossom trees during Betty's childhood; this memory ultimately brings an end to Ross's rampage as the Red Hulk. In creating Ross's theme score, American composer Laura Karpman explained that his theme had to reflect his presidential position while also reflecting the loss and mourning of his relationship with his daughter.

A now-deleted alternate ending to the film was also filmed which saw Betty attending a funeral, likely that of Ross after his battle as the Red Hulk with Wilson. Set photos from 2023 confirmed this, and showed Tyler as Betty attending a funeral alongside Wilson and Bat-Seraph. Despite this, Onah noted that they never filmed a version of the movie where he "explicitly died", but rather left his fate ambiguous.

=== Special effects and VFX ===
In Captain America: Brave New World, Ross's transformation into the Red Hulk required motion capture and visual effects (VFX) technology, which Ford embraced after having utilised de-aging effects for his role in Indiana Jones and the Dial of Destiny (2023). The visual development team for the Red Hulk was led by Ryan Meinerding alongside the New Zealand–based digital VFX company, Wētā FX. The team at Wētā was involved in making Red Hulk resemble Ford with CGI. They scanned Ford's face to enhance the Red Hulk's visual effects including scaled proportions of his eyes, nose and mouth. This also required filming him giving an "angry performance" at Trilith Studios. Speaking to Variety, Ford noted that the motion capture process required him to be "an idiot for money, which [he had] done before". He clarified that he did not mean to "disparage" it, but added that "you have to do certain things that normally your mother would not want you to do — or your acting coach, if you had one", but noted that he had fun doing so. Describing the process, Wētā visual effects supervisor Dan Cox praised Ford saying that he was "all in that morning".

Alessandro Ongaro, the film's visual effects supervisor, called the Red Hulk one of the most "complex characters that Wētā FX has ever done", naming Cox and animation supervisor Sidney Kombo-Kintombo as responsible for the character's "phenomenal previs, postvis and animation". On the character's design, Cox noted that Onah did not want the Red Hulk to be a copy or color-swapped version of the Hulk but rather appear more tactical and methodical due to Ross's military background. While the VFX for Mark Ruffalo's green Hulk was based on apes and gorillas, Ford's Red Hulk was based on a bear with Onah stating that they wanted him "to have a slightly different posture" and a "different way he held his chest out". Wētā FX brought in a bodybuilder as reference to see how Red Hulk's muscles would move. They also utilised their "Loki state machine" to model a new high-resolution muscle set, and to help show "bones breaking, reforming, driving under the skin, vein detail, and clothes ripping and disintegrating". Ongaro explained that initially they wanted the transformation to be a "little more disgusting" with "skin tearing and breaking on his hand" alongside "bones popping off", but that it would have broken the "peacefulness" the scene was trying to portray. Onah noted that a key inspiration for the Red Hulk's transformation was An American Werewolf in London (1981).

Red Hulk's CGI received generally positive reviews with RogerEbert.com writer Robert Daniels calling the effects "actually pretty stellar", and a standout within the film. Screen Rant writer Molly Freeman also praised Wētā's CGI and VFX despite some negative feelings towards the Tidal Basin cherry blossoms backdrop which she described as a "green screen mess". Conversely, while The Hollywood Reporter writer Frank Scheck gave a positive response in seeing Ford's facial features in the Red Hulk, he also felt that the character was "only slightly more visually convincing than his de-aged Indiana Jones" in Dial of Destiny. The film received a nomination for Outstanding Achievement for Character Animation in a Live Action Production at the 53rd Annie Awards.

In the film, Ford's portrayal of Ross is noticeably missing the character's signature moustache. Screen Rant writer Kai Young noted that "VFX artists may have struggled to properly animate the Red Hulk with Ross' mustache, or this could have simply looked too silly to bring into live-action, so getting rid of it meant that the Red Hulk's emergence wasn't a comedic affair". Onah also noted in an interview with Collider that there was debate whether or not they would make the Red Hulk speak, with eventually deciding that he would be best portrayed as a "figure of rage and anger" without the ability to speak. Hurt was digitally de-aged for his role in Black Widow.

=== Political comparisons ===
Any resemblance to US Presidents living or dead is entirely coincidental. So far, we have not had a President who can transform into a Hulk [...] This is about one man trying to deal with his own history, with his own temperament, with his own circumstances.

— Harrison Ford on any coincidental resemblances to US Presidents.

Some fans and critics compared President Ross to that of real-life American President Donald Trump. Reason writer Peter Suderman called Ross a "loose allegory" for Trump, opining that despite the film being shot before the 2024 United States presidential election where Trump won a non-consecutive second term, it was not hard to overlook any parallels. He felt the movie was a warning for the "perils of supercharged executive power" running amok. Writing for the same publication, writer Matthew Rosza opined that "Trump, at his worst, is easily the inferior of Marvel's Ross since his motivation for not accepting the election results was pure ego", and noted that while Ross gave up his power in the end, Trump "refused to do the right thing". David Fear, writing for Rolling Stone, joked that Ross is "still only the second-most destructive, rage-filled" President.

The assassination attempt on President Ross by Isaiah Bradley was compared to the attempted assassination of Donald Trump by Thomas Matthew Crooks, which occurred two days after the Captain America: Brave New World trailer was released. Screen Rant writer Kevin Erdmann found the situation "bizarre" feeling that it was not "hard to draw parallels", but did add that it was not the first time a Captain America project referenced real life situations, remembering a pandemic-related subplot of The Falcon and the Winter Soldier (2021) being deleted due to the COVID-19 pandemic. Some compared Ross's international treaty to Trump's "America First" policies, which cancelled federal diversity programs and ultimately pulled the US out of "out of international treaties and threatened America's allies". Responding to this, Onah told AFP that "telling a story like this, there is always going to be things that touch on the world we live in", but noted that his priority was to make "a great escape for audiences to go have a good time". Additionally, Ross destroying the White House as the Red Hulk was linked with the January 6 United States Capitol attack, while Suderman also noted similarities between Samuel Sterns and his manipulation of Ross, to that of Elon Musk's relationship with Trump.

In an Esquire interview, Anthony Mackie denounced the comparisons noting that he is "tired of all the political jousting", urging fans to "chill" and go watch the movie. Ford also commented on the comparisons, noting he "would not taint any movie with the reality of the world we're living in right now", adding he "prefers the reality of the Marvel universe to the morning's news".

== Differences from the comics ==
=== Original derivations ===
In the mainstream comics set in the Marvel Universe (Earth-616), Ross's comic counterpart, Thunderbolt Ross, made his debut in The Incredible Hulk #1 (1962) and was primarily depicted as a villain for the Hulk. In Hulk #1 (2008), the Red Hulk made its appearance, but it was not until World War Hulk (2010) that the character was revealed to be Ross. Ross has been well received in the comics, being ranked at number 71 by IGN on their list of the "Greatest Comic Book Villains of All Time".

There are various differences between the MCU and comic version of the Red Hulk. In the comics, the Red Hulk's body functions as a "living heat generator", being able to generate enough heat to often melt metal, as his temperature rises proportionally with his anger. Brave New World incorporated these elements from the comics with the Red Hulk's transformation being "accompanied by fiery particles [...] with nearby materials visibly charred from the intense heat", but the film itself does not address the character's thermal abilities. Red Hulk also had the power to absorb energy which was not present in the film. Additionally, in the comics, Ross transformed into Red Hulk with the help of Intelligencia headed by MODOK, while in the MCU, Samuel Sterns gave him his powers through gamma-radiated pills. In the comics, despite being depicted as a villain, Red Hulk has appeared as a member of the Avengers, and has led the Thunderbolts, a team composed of various antiheroes including the Punisher and Elektra.

=== Nicknames ===
Throughout the comics and in other various media, Ross as a character has had various titles and nicknames, most notably nicknamed "Thunderbolt". However, in the MCU, this nickname is not utilised until Brave New World, and is not fully addressed or explained except as a "cool nickname that adds to his legendary military status". Joe George writing for Men's Health opined that the nickname may have derived from his rise into becoming the US President "with a reputation as a war-mongering hot-head". Contrastingly, in the comics, Ross earned the name during a fight in the South Pacific "for his tendency to strike like thunder". In Brave New World, Ross also earned the "insult[ing]" nickname "Hulk Hunter" for his relentless chase of Bruce Banner, and his unintentional creation of the Abomination and its subsequent battle with the Hulk.

== Fictional character biography ==
=== Early life and military career ===
Thaddeus Ross joined the United States Army and served during the Vietnam War. Ross worked his way up the American military, eventually becoming a three-starred lieutenant general. He married Karen Lee who later died, but not before the two had a daughter named Betty Ross. Ross often took Betty, as a young girl, to see the cherry blossom trees in Washington D.C.'s Tidal Basin.

Sometime before 2010, Ross became involved in a military research program, Project Gamma Pulse, aimed at replicating the Super Soldier Serum, which was created by Doctor Abraham Erskine in World War II to create the super soldier Captain America. Doctors Bruce Banner and Betty become involved in the project believing gamma radiation to be the answer to Erskine's original formula. During an experiment, Ross and Betty watch as Banner transforms into the Hulk. The Hulk kills two scientists, knocks Betty unconscious, crushes Ross's left arm and escapes. Ross blames Banner (who goes into hiding) for the incident and vows to hunt him down, causing a rift between himself and Betty.

=== Hunting down Bruce Banner ===
In 2010, Ross becomes aware that Banner is hiding out in Rio de Janeiro, Brazil. He recruits a team of soldiers, including British Royal Marine Emil Blonsky, to bring Banner in tranquillised, but does not divulge information about Banner's condition to them. After arriving in Brazil, Ross watches on a computer inside a van as the team attempts to capture Banner who turns into the Hulk killing various soldiers, and escapes. Ross later informs an angry Blonsky of Banner's condition, and offers him a similar serum, gaining enhanced abilities.

Ross tracks Banner to Culver University, where Banner has reunited with Betty. As Ross and his army attempt to capture Banner in his Hulk form, Betty begs her father to stop. Ross watches as Blonsky is subsequently kicked by the Hulk across the university's field, breaking every bone in his body. Banner escapes with Betty. Blonsky survives his injuries with the help of Ross's first serum, and allows him to be injected with more. Ross tracks Banner and Betty down trying to cure Banner with the help of Samuel Sterns, and takes them into custody. Unbeknownst to Ross, Blonsky coerces Sterns to further enhance his strength. Sterns transforms Blonsky into a monstrous "Abomination", who goes on a rampage around Harlem. Ross reluctantly allows Banner to transform into the Hulk to stop him. After the Hulk defeats Blonsky, Ross watches him escape one last time while Betty vows to never speak to her father again.

Ross is later approached in a bar by Tony Stark, acting as a consultant for S.H.I.E.L.D., who informs him that a team is being put together. Ross attempts to have Stark removed from the bar and refuses to release Blonsky into S.H.I.E.L.D. custody. Sometime after, Ross uses Sterns as a scapegoat, blaming him for the Harlem incident. He imprisons Sterns in Camp Echo One, an underground military base, and exposes him to more gamma radiation to further increase his perception of probabilities. He enslaved him by forcing him to make advanced weapons and create strategies to further advance his career; Ross promises to pardon and release Sterns if he gets elected president.

=== Secretary of State and the Sokovia Accords ===
By 2016, Ross had suffered from a heart attack and underwent thirteen hours of a triple bypass surgery, and consequently retires from the military. He is appointed as the United States Secretary of State by President Matthew Ellis. He visits the Avengers Compound and presents the Avengers with the Sokovia Accords, a set of legal documents signed by 117 countries, designed to regulate the activities of powered individuals such as themselves. He gives Stark thirty-six hours to bring Rogers in for violating the Accords by aiding Bucky Barnes who was a suspect in a terrorist bombing at the United Nations. After Stark brings in Rogers's allies (Sam Wilson, Wanda Maximoff, Clint Barton and Scott Lang), Ross locks them up in the Raft, a maximum security prison designed to hold enhanced people.

Sometime after the Avengers Civil War, Ross undergoes a second triple bypass surgery, (Note: As mentioned in Black Widow (2021), and cited by Screen Rant.) and is now dying from heart failure. Running out of hope, Ross reapproaches Sterns, who develops pills to keep him alive. Ross refuses to release Sterns for fear that he would no longer make the pills. Unbeknownst to Ross, Sterns then alters the pills and adds gamma radiation wanting to destroy Ross' legacy. Ross later pursues Natasha Romanoff who is in violation of the Accords for assisting Rogers. Ross tracks Romanoff down to a train station with a SWAT team, only to find her tracker. He later tracks her down to the destruction of the Red Room which Romanoff orchestrated. Sometime after, Ross becomes acquainted with a former Black Widow assassin, Ruth Bat-Seraph. Later, Ross attempts to contact Stark about Rogers and Romanoff breaking into the Raft to free their allies; Stark puts Ross on hold, much to his annoyance.

In 2018, Ross contacts James Rhodes at the Avengers Compound about the disappearance of Vision. After seeing Vision brought in by Rogers, Wilson, Romanoff, and Maximoff, he orders Rhodes to arrest them. When Rhodes refuses, Ross responds by placing him under court-martial. Ross later falls victim to the Blip. In 2023, Ross is revived and attends Stark's funeral.

=== President of the United States ===
In November 2026, Ross is elected as the President of the United States, and is upset when his daughter, Betty, does not attend his inauguration. In response to the emergence of a "Celestial Island" in the Indian Ocean, (Note: An island formed when the Celestial Tiamut emerged, as depicted in the film Eternals (2021).) Ross sets up an international treaty with Japan, India, and France to govern the mining and distribution of a rare metal inside the island known as Adamantium.

In 2027, Ross sends the newly appointed Captain America, Sam Wilson, and Joaquin Torres to Oaxaca, Mexico to stop the criminal organization Serpent from selling stolen refined samples of Adamantium. Ross later invites Wilson, Torres and Isaiah Bradley to a summit at the White House with various world leaders. During the meeting, Bradley and four other men attempt to assassinate Ross. Wilson, Torres and Bat-Seraph, now Ross's security advisor, manage to stop them and arrest Bradley, who denies any knowledge of the attack.

Thaddeus Ross as the Red Hulk, as portrayed by Harrison Ford via motion capture done by Wētā FX

Ross subsequently faces difficulties with the world leaders, who no longer believe he can save the treaty. He flies to Japan, with Secret Service agent Leila Taylor, to speak to the Prime Minister of Japan, Ozaki. Taylor informs Ross that Wilson and Torres have gone off-grid, with Ross ordering her to apprehend them. He receives a call from Sterns who reveals he is behind the assassination attempts, and threatens to make Betty despise him even more; Ross sends Bat-Seraph to Camp Echo One to stop Sterns. Once in Japan, Ozaki refuses to uphold the treaty and accuses Ross of having sent Serpent to steal the Adamantium. When the intel is proven true, Ross leads the United States Army at Celestial Island in a race to acquire Adamantium before Ozaki.

Wilson, Torres and Bat-Seraph, now having joined forces, arrive on the ship to stop Ross from advancing on the Island, now knowing Sterns is behind the conflict. Ross tells Wilson of his heart failures, revealing that Sterns saved his life and that he still wanted to repair his relationship with Betty. Ross becomes angry after another phone call with Sterns, although he calms down after Wilson and Torres manage to stop two pilots that Sterns had brainwashed from declaring war on the Japanese. With the conflict resolved, Ross returns to Washington, D.C., and rings Betty; the two share a heartfelt phone call.

During a press conference, Ross loses control of his emotions after being hounded by the press, and turns into a Red Hulk due to the excess gamma radiation in his body from Sterns' pills. Wilson arrives and fights the Red Hulk who destroys the White House and the surrounding D.C. monuments and landscape. Unable to overpower the Red Hulk, Wilson attempts to calm him down by reminding him of visits to D.C.'s cherry blossom trees with Betty. After being talked down by Wilson, Ross reverts to normal, takes full responsibility for his actions, and stands down as president. He is incarcerated at the Raft where he reunites with Betty.

== Alternate versions ==
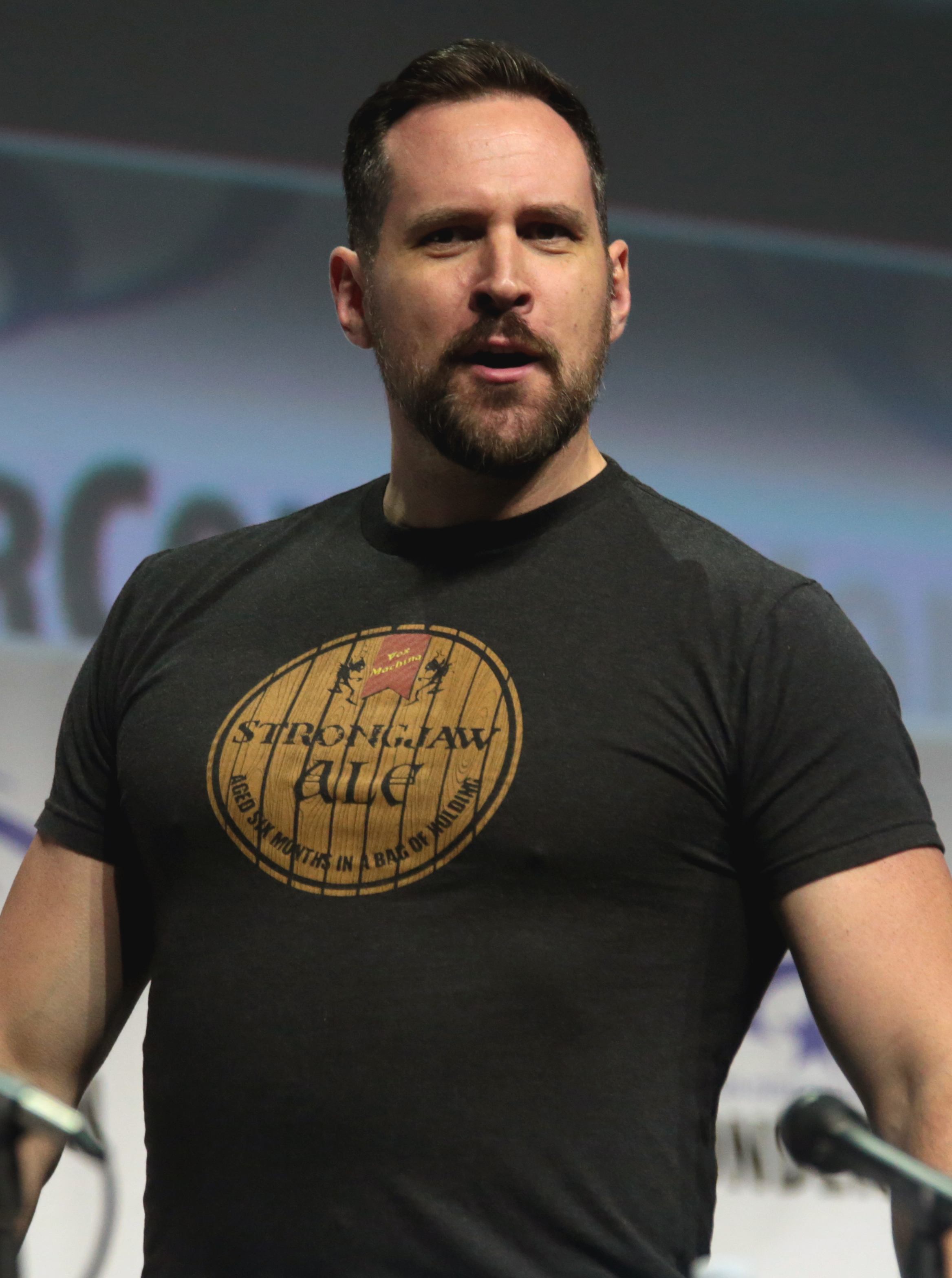
American voice actor Travis Willingham voiced Ross in the Disney+ animated series Your Friendly Neighborhood Spider-Man (2025)

Multiple alternate versions of Ross are depicted in the MCU multiverse, voiced by Michael Patrick McGill in the Disney+ animated anthology series What If...?, and by Travis Willingham in the Disney+ animated series Your Friendly Neighborhood Spider-Man.

=== What If...? ===
- In an alternate 2010, Ross leads the United States Army at Culver University in order to capture Banner. He finds Banner with Betty Ross and Natasha Romanoff who both try to stop Ross from attacking. During the chaos, a soldier accidentally shoots Banner turning him into the Hulk. Unbeknownst to everyone else, a revenge-driven angry Yellowjacket / Hank Pym enters Banner's body and enlarges his heart with Pym Particles. Ross watches in horror as Banner explodes.
- In another alternate universe, Ross is made aware of the murder of Tony Stark, apparently at the hands of the Wakandans. He seizes Stark's assets despite protests from Pepper Potts. Ross puts the Stark Liberator Drones into production, and wages war on Wakanda. However, once the drones passed beyond Wakanda's protective barrier, their signals were disrupted before being destroyed by the Wakandan army and a traitorous Erik Stevens.
- In an alternate 2015, Ross watches as Infinity Ultron launches all of Earth's nuclear weapons on itself, leading to the extinction of the human race.

=== Other universes ===
- In an alternate 2016, Ross attends a charity diner in support of an incident in Lagos. He is approached by Norman Osborn who asks him how the search for Steve Rogers is going. Ross refuses to comment. Osborn brags about his security before Ross notices an intruder alarm on Osborn's tablet, suggesting Osborn focus on his own security. Ross later receives intel from Osborn about Otto Octavius illegally distributing Gamma-infused weaponry. Ross orders a raid on Octavius' lab, and calls on Iron Man to help stop him.

== Reception ==
=== Hurt's portrayal ===
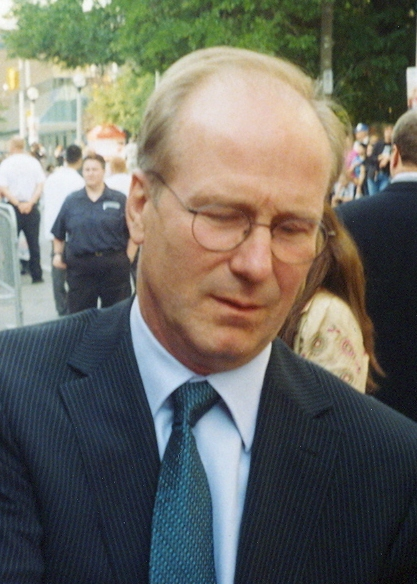
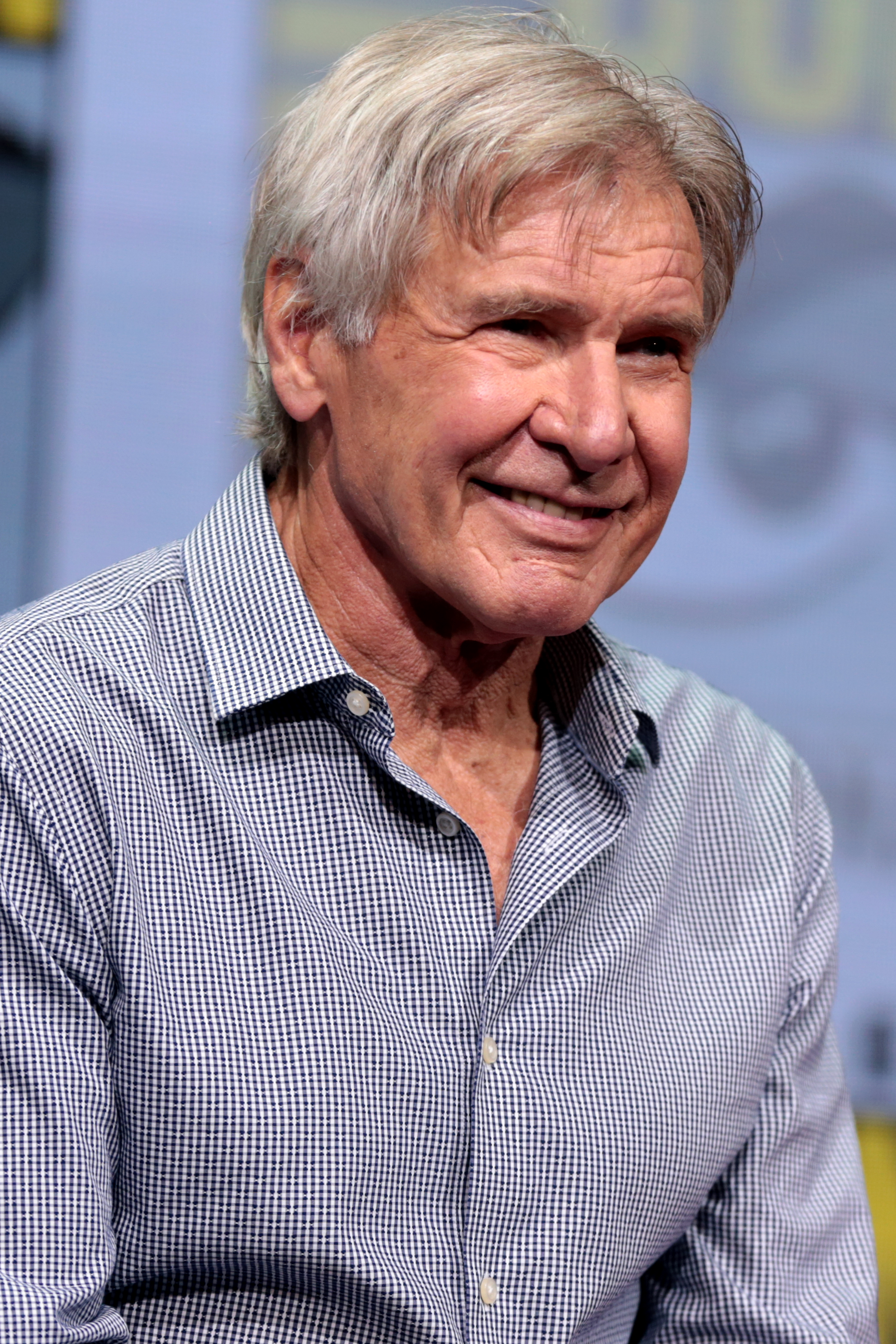
Ross has been portrayed by William Hurt (left) and Harrison Ford (right); both have received generally positive reviews for their roles.

Hurt's portrayal of Ross received a generally mixed-to-positive reception with Looper and BuzzFeed ranking him at numbers 71 and 36 respectively in their list of worst to best MCU villains. For his role in The Incredible Hulk (2008), BuzzFeed News writer Adam Vary noted that Hurt is "never not interesting" but the character was often "so all over the place that there's not much there for [Hurt] to play". In a review for the same film, writing for The Independent Critic, Richard Popes praised Hurt's portrayal, opining that he "shines by giving General Ross the perfect touch of humanity to accompany his obviously dastardly ways".

For his role in Captain America: Civil War (2016), We Are Movie Geeks writer Jim Batts opined that after eight years, Hurt fits well into the current MCU, feeling that he "added an air of stern gravitas".

=== Ford's portrayal ===
Despite the film's mixed reception, Ford's portrayal of Ross in Captain America: Brave New World (2025) received positive reviews with various journalists finding his portrayal to have "gravitas". (Note: As per The Guardian, Radio New Zealand, SlashFilm, and Entertainment Weekly.) Collider writer Aidan Kelley praised Ford's portrayal for "inject[ing] a lot of humanity into a previously pretty unlikable character". Radio New Zealand writer Samuel Rillstone added that Ross "gets a little short-changed towards the end" and "would've liked a little more out of him".

Entertainment Weekly writer Maureen Lee Lenker also positively reviewed Ford's portrayal, opining that he "acts the hell out of his scenes", and that he "commands any scene he's in with a gruff stillness, but he also brings compassion to Ross, transforming him from a military shill to a character who's easy to root for". Lee Lenker added that while the Red Hulk reveal was inevitable and known to most audience members, "it's a testament to Ford's intuitive, deft performance that the moment still feels shocking when it does finally come". The Hollywood Reporter writer Frank Scheck echoed this, praising Ford's performance saying that he "makes the most of it, even subjecting himself to the rigors of motion capture for his character's extreme physical transformation".

SlashFilm writer Rafael Motamayor opined that Ross was the best part of Brave New World, describing him as a "complex and interesting character". He felt that Ross grounded the film in seriousness despite moments where the role was "goofy". Writing for the same publication, Devin Meenan criticized the comic version of the character calling his comics "insufferable", but praised Ford's casting opining that it was a "fun throwback" to his role as a president in Air Force One (1997).

==== Accolades ====
Year	Work	Award	Category	Result	Ref.
2025	Captain America: Brave New World	Kids' Choice Awards	Favorite Villain	Nominated	

== In other media ==
=== Video games ===
Ross appears in The Incredible Hulk (2008), a tie-in video game to the film of the same name, voiced by William Hurt. Additionally, Red Hulk appears as a playable character in the GameStop-exclusive Xbox 360 version.

=== Tie-in comics ===
Ross has also appeared in various tie-in comic books related to the MCU including Iron Man 2: Public Identity (2010), a three-issue comic book, which saw Ross commissioning Justin Hammer to build a single-pilot vehicle to replace Tony Stark's Iron Man suit. Ross also appeared in Marvel's Black Widow Prelude (2020), where he has a discussion with Councilwoman Hawley about Natasha Romanoff and gains the cooperation of the World Security Council to track her down, leading into the events of Black Widow (2021).

== Merchandise ==
Funko released multiple variant bobbleheads of Ross as both human and the Red Hulk in support of Captain America: Brave New World. Three versions of these were as the Red Hulk; two 6-inch versions (one standard and the other dubbed a "Retro Comic" variant), and one standard sized as part of the film's "Marvel Collector Corps" surprise box. A version of Ross as a human was also released. Lego released two Lego sets featuring the character based on Brave New World; one was titled "Captain America vs. Red Hulk Battle" featuring a Bigfigure of Ford's Red Hulk, while the other was a BrickHeadz-themed set of both Red Hulk and Captain America.

Hasbro released a set of "Red Hulk Gamma Smash Fists" which allows wearers to slip on Red Hulk's hands and "imagine having superhuman strength". They additionally released a 6-inch Marvel Legends action figure, and a 4-inch Marvel Epic Hero figure which sported a melted car door accessory. Hot Toys also released a 47 cm tall sixth-scale action figurine of the Red Hulk with Ford's likeness, while Iron Studios released a 1/10 sized statue version marking "the first time in a while that [they] released an MCU-adjacent figure".

== See also ==
- Characters of the Marvel Cinematic Universe
- Lists of fictional presidents of the United States
