= Savage House (film) =

- Theatrical release poster
- Directed by: Peter Glanz
- Written by: Peter Glanz
- Produced by: Peter Glanz; Oliver Roskill; Mark Hopkins; Dylan Maranda; Phillip Thomas
- Starring: Richard E. Grant; Claire Foy; Jack Farthing; Bel Powley; Kíla Lord Cassidy
- Cinematography: Adriano Goldman
- Edited by: Peter Glanz
- Music by: Peter Glanz
- Production companies: Record Player Films; Deluge Pictures
- Distributed by: Paramount Pictures
- Release dates: 3 June 2026 (SXSW London); 5 June 2026 (United Kingdom)
- Running time: 114 minutes
- Country: United Kingdom
- Language: English
- Box office: $464,179

Savage House is a 2026 British black comedy period film written and directed by Peter Glanz. The film stars Richard E. Grant, Claire Foy, Jack Farthing, Bel Powley, and Kíla Lord Cassidy.

Savage House was released in the United Kingdom by Paramount Pictures on 5 June 2026.

== Plot ==
In the early eighteenth century, Sir Chauncey and Lady Savage are an impoverished couple living in a Yorkshire mansion with their daughter Fanny. The Duke and Duchess of Devonshire inform the Savages that they intend to stay with them for a short time because a massive pox outbreak and the Jacobite uprising have made it unsafe for them to stay with their original host, Lord Vernon. The Savages sell their family heirlooms and get into enormous debt in their preparations. Meanwhile, their household servants, valet Reginald Halifax and chambermaid Dorothy Neville, are secretly a couple conspiring to end their employers' marriage and benefit financially from their ruin.

Chauncey pays two stablemen, Darby and Leslie, to pose as footmen for a rehearsal dinner, at which the food disgusts Chauncey and Lady. A severe case of inflammatory arthritis and gout causes a doctor to forbid Chauncey to eat any red meat or drink any wine, an order which he ignores. Lady Savage continues to sell her family heirlooms to fund the reception, including her grandmother's priceless diamond ring. The Savages' invitees all reject their invitations, citing fear of the pox, but the Savages fear it is actually because Chauncey is low-born. Their interfering neighbours, the Bennetts, try to get an invite for themselves and are consistently denied. In the garden, Leslie overhears Dorothy and Reginald plotting, and is promptly chased away by Reginald.

While sitting for a portrait, Chauncey angrily berates his household staff before collapsing. The doctor gives him laudanum and applies leeches to his foot, berating him for not following his orders. Chauncey wakes in the night and discovers his wife and Reginald having sex; he challenges Reginald to a duel. Chauncey is forced to ask Mr. Bennett to be his second at the duel, which means he is also forced to invite the Bennetts to the dinner. Lady Savage offers to pay Reginald to spare her husband's life, but he refuses; Mr. Bennett bribes Reginald to kill Chauncey, knowing that he would be able to receive the Devonshires if Chauncey died. At the duel, Chauncey is wounded in the arm before shooting Reginald in the head, killing him.

On the eve of the dinner, Chauncey wakes to find that his wounded arm has become gangrenous. Mr. Black, a debt collector, arrives to arrest Chauncey, but he charms him into coming to the dinner. Chauncey promotes Darby, who turns out to have the pox, to valet, and finds two vagrants in the forest to employ as his footmen, who are revealed to be thieving Jacobites. Fanny is delighted to witness a lunar eclipse, but during the darkness Dorothy poisons Fanny's pet mice and leaves the household. Chauncey collapses in pain and the doctor is forced to amputate his arm.

On the day of the dinner, a lavish feast is prepared and the guests arrive, but there is no sign of the Devonshires. Forced by Chauncey to remain seated, the guests sleep and wake up at dawn to a messenger at the door. He delivers a letter which informs the Savages that the Duke and Duchess have decided to stay with Lord Vernon as originally planned. Chauncey is arrested and sent to a debtors' prison while the Savages fall into ruin.

== Cast ==
- Richard E. Grant as Sir Chauncey Savage
- Claire Foy as Lady Savage
- Jack Farthing as Reginald Halifax
- Bel Powley as Dorothy Neville
- Kíla Lord Cassidy as Fanny Savage
- Richard McCabe as Mr. Bennett
- Vicki Pepperdine as Mrs. Bennett
- Pip Torrens as Mr. Black
- Miles Jupp as Decorator

== Production ==
The film was written and directed by American filmmaker Peter Glanz. Claire Foy and Richard E. Grant play the lead characters, and the cast includes Bel Powley, Jack Farthing, Kíla Lord Cassidy, Richard McCabe, Vicki Pepperdine and Pip Torrens.

The film was a Record Player Films production; the producers are Oliver Roskill, Mark Hopkins, Glanz, Phillip Thomas and Dylan Maranda. Cinematographer Adriano Goldman was director of photography, costume designer Alex Bovaird oversaw the wardrobe department, Gary Williamson was production designer, and Jacquetta Levon was the make-up designer.

Screenwriter and director Peter Glanz said the film is set in 1715 - that is, the first year of the Georgian period, in the reign of George I. The plot involves a visit by the Duke of Devonshire and his wife. Speaking of the film, Glanz said: "I love period films. They allow us to be a step removed, to look in the mirror and see ourselves (and hopefully laugh at ourselves) without the preconceived baggage of modern life." He said that the film was inspired in part by the 6 January 2021 United States Capitol attack.

Principal photography took place in the United Kingdom over 6 weeks in the autumn/winter of 2023 and the production was described as "recently wrapped" in February 2024. Locations included Montacute House in Somerset, representing the titular Savage House. Other locations include Syon House and West Wycombe Park. Claire Foy said that the shoot "was genuinely fun from start to finish ... Richard [E. Grant] is a total one-off."

== Release ==
The film was originally scheduled to be released in late 2024. The film had its world premiere at the SXSW London on 3 June 2026, before being released theatrically in the United Kingdom, Ireland and the United States on 5 June 2026, by Paramount Pictures.

== Reception ==
The film currently scores 72% from 18 reviews on review aggregator Rotten Tomatoes.

Peter Bradshaw of The Guardian awarded the film three stars, noting the "black-belt performances" of Foy and Grant. Danny Leigh of The Financial Times also gave the film three stars. Kevin Maher of The Times gave the film five stars, and described the film as "uproariously funny, suddenly bleak and then tragically poignant, often within the same sequence", noting that "Grant excels as a slippery Georgian social climber and Foy is equally compelling as his long-suffering wife in a brilliant black comedy." Wendy Ide of The Observer called it "grimly compelling", noting that "there’s something grubbily compelling about this tale of venal people and their doomed pursuit of power. Alistair Harkness of The Scotsman found the film a "putrid period romp that tries a little too hard to channel the filth and fury of The Favourite and the irony of Barry Lyndon". Mark Kermode compared the film to The Draughtsman's Contract, The Young Poisoner's Handbook, The Favourite, The Crown, Saltburn and Barry Lyndon, noting "The thing that I enjoyed most about it was how much I thought that Richard E. Grant and Claire Foy were having a ball.".

Guy Lodge of Variety praised Foy and Grant's performances, while noting "The brisk, nasty chill cast by the film may prove divisive; ditto its unapologetically ghastly characters", whom he compares to Roald Dahl's The Twits. Jacob Oller of AV Club gave the film a lukewarm review, observing it was an "on-ramp for a certain kind of costume film."
