= Captain America: Brave New World =

2025 Marvel Studios film

- Theatrical release poster
- Directed by: Julius Onah
- Screenplay by: Rob Edwards; Malcolm Spellman; Dalan Musson; Julius Onah; Peter Glanz
- Story by: Rob Edwards; Malcolm Spellman; Dalan Musson
- Based on: Marvel Comics
- Produced by: Kevin Feige; Nate Moore
- Starring: Anthony Mackie; Danny Ramirez; Shira Haas; Carl Lumbly; Xosha Roquemore; Giancarlo Esposito; Liv Tyler; Tim Blake Nelson; Harrison Ford
- Cinematography: Kramer Morgenthau
- Edited by: Matthew Schmidt; Madeleine Gavin
- Music by: Laura Karpman
- Production company: Marvel Studios
- Distributed by: Walt Disney Studios Motion Pictures
- Release dates: February 11, 2025 (TCL Chinese Theatre); February 14, 2025 (United States)
- Running time: 118 minutes
- Country: United States
- Language: English
- Budget: $180 million
- Box office: $415 million

Captain America: Brave New World is a 2025 American superhero film based on Marvel Comics featuring the character Sam Wilson / Captain America. Produced by Marvel Studios and distributed by Walt Disney Studios Motion Pictures, it is the fourth installment in the Captain America film series, a continuation of the television miniseries The Falcon and the Winter Soldier (2021), and the 35th film in the Marvel Cinematic Universe (MCU). The film was directed by Julius Onah from a screenplay by Rob Edwards and the writing teams of Malcolm Spellman & Dalan Musson and Onah & Peter Glanz. It stars Anthony Mackie as Sam Wilson / Captain America alongside Danny Ramirez, Shira Haas, Carl Lumbly, Xosha Roquemore, Giancarlo Esposito, Liv Tyler, Tim Blake Nelson, and Harrison Ford. In the film, Wilson investigates a conspiracy involving U.S. president Thaddeus Ross (Ford).

Captain America: Civil War (2016) ended the Captain America trilogy starring Chris Evans as Steve Rogers, and Wilson becomes the new Captain America in The Falcon and the Winter Soldier. Series writers Spellman and Musson were writing a new Captain America film by April 2021, and Mackie signed on that August. Onah joined in July 2022, when the title Captain America: New World Order was announced. Additional cast members joined later that year. Nelson and Tyler returned from the second MCU film, The Incredible Hulk (2008), while Ford replaced William Hurt as Ross following Hurt's death in March 2022; Ross becomes the superpowered Red Hulk in the film. Filming took place from March to June 2023 at Trilith Studios in Atlanta, Georgia, with additional filming in Washington, D.C. The subtitle was changed to Brave New World during filming. Matthew Orton joined in December 2023 to write for reshoots, which took place between May and November 2024, and added Esposito to the film. The involvement of Edwards and Glanz was revealed that December.

Captain America: Brave New World premiered on February 11, 2025, at the TCL Chinese Theatre in Hollywood, Los Angeles, and was released in the United States on February 14 as part of Phase Five of the MCU. It grossed $415 million worldwide. The film received mixed reviews from critics for its story, connections to other MCU projects, and its visual effects. The performances, particularly those of Mackie and Ford, received praise.

== Plot ==
Five months after Thaddeus Ross is elected president of the United States, he sends Sam Wilson and Joaquin Torres—the new Captain America and Falcon, respectively—to Oaxaca, Mexico, to stop the illegal sale of classified items stolen by Sidewinder and his mercenary group Serpent. Wilson and Torres recover the items, but Sidewinder escapes. Torres is excited to be taking on Wilson's former mantle of Falcon, but Wilson is hesitant to involve Torres in dangerous missions due to the pair not having superpowers like former Captain America Steve Rogers. After the mission, Wilson and Torres train with Isaiah Bradley, a super soldier who was imprisoned and experimented on by the U.S. government.

Ross invites Wilson and Torres to a summit with world leaders at the White House, and Wilson accepts on the condition that Bradley is also invited. Ross asks Wilson to help him reform the Avengers. During the summit, Ross explains that a new metal, adamantium, has been discovered on "Celestial Island", which was formed when the Celestial Tiamut emerged in the Indian Ocean. (Note: As depicted in the film Eternals (2021)) The recovered items were the first refined samples of the metal and were stolen from a Japanese mining operation. To avoid an arms race, Ross proposes a treaty to govern adamantium's mining and distribution. As he is talking, the song "Mr. Blue" plays and causes several men, including Bradley, to begin shooting at Ross and other dignitaries. Apprehended by Ross's head of security, former Black Widow Ruth Bat-Seraph, the men regain their senses and deny any knowledge of the attack.

While investigating, Wilson is ambushed by Sidewinder and captures him. Torres tracks a call on Sidewinder's phone to a hidden black site in West Virginia called Camp Echo One. Ross tries to salvage the treaty, but the Japanese government blames him for the theft of their adamantium and the subsequent White House attack. Ross realizes that the mastermind behind these events is Dr. Samuel Sterns, who gained advanced intelligence after being exposed to the blood of Bruce Banner / Hulk during the Abomination's rampage through Harlem. (Note: As depicted in the film The Incredible Hulk (2008)) Ross imprisoned Sterns at Camp Echo One, publicly blamed him for the Abomination's actions, and promised to release him if Sterns helped advance him to the presidency. Wilson and Torres find Sterns and learn how he uses technology and the song "Mr. Blue" to control minds. He escapes while they are fighting mind-controlled soldiers.

Ross sends Bat-Seraph to secure Camp Echo One, where she finds and helps Wilson and Torres. The trio meet with Wilson's military friend Dennis Dunphy, who has Sidewinder in custody. Wilson learns enough from Sidewinder to deduce Sterns's plan to destroy Ross's reputation. Wilson, Torres, and Bat-Seraph go to Celestial Island where Ross and Ozaki, the Prime Minister of Japan, are racing to claim ownership of adamantium. Ross tells Wilson that he is dying of heart failure and had Sterns develop pills that have prolonged his life; Ross refused to release Sterns for fear that he would no longer make the pills, leading to Sterns's anger and plans for revenge. Sterns takes control of the minds of two American pilots and makes them attack the Japanese fleet. Wilson and Torres intercept the planes and convince the Japanese to stand down, but Torres is injured in the fight.

Wilson is consoled by his friend Bucky Barnes. Sterns kills Dunphy, who learned that the pills have been adding gamma radiation to Ross's body, and surrenders himself to Wilson. Sterns's arrest and connection to Ross are publicly revealed while the latter is at a press conference. Ross loses control of his emotions and transforms into a red Hulk, destroying part of the White House. Wilson injures Ross enough that he can be reasoned with, and reminds Ross of visits to Washington, D.C.'s cherry blossom trees with his estranged daughter Betty. Ross reverts to normal. After the incident, Bradley is exonerated, Wilson invites a recovering Torres to join the Avengers, and the treaty is ratified. Ross resigns and has himself incarcerated at the Raft, where Wilson and Betty visit him. In a post-credits scene, an imprisoned Sterns warns Wilson of a coming attack from other worlds. (Note: Identified off-screen as pertaining to the alternate universes of the multiverse)

== Cast ==
- Anthony Mackie as Sam Wilson / Captain America:
  An Avenger and former pararescueman who was trained by the military in aerial combat using a specially designed wing pack. Producer Nate Moore said Wilson's Captain America is an underdog similar to Rocky Balboa from the Rocky film series, because he does not have the abilities or allies of the previous Captain America, Steve Rogers. Wilson has to earn the mantle after claiming it without support. Director Julius Onah said the film would show Wilson "stepping up to be the leader as Captain America". Mackie said Wilson would not be a judgmental Captain America and has a different understanding of good and evil, with a focus on listening, compassion, and counseling. He likened his performance to the Tupac Shakur song "Hit 'Em Up" (1996). Onah said empathy was Wilson's "superpower". He wanted to use the character's emotional intelligence to help resolve President Thaddeus Ross's story, for which Wilson has to "see past his own blind spots" regarding Ross. Since Wilson is not a super soldier like Rogers, he uses Captain America's shield and his wingsuit—both made from the fictional metal vibranium—to "level the playing field" in fights. To prepare for the film's action sequences, Mackie focused on yoga and Pilates routines to improve his flexibility and core strength.
- Danny Ramirez as Joaquin Torres / Falcon:
  A captain in the U.S. Air Force who takes on Wilson's former mantle of Falcon, using a similar wing pack. Mackie said Wilson and Torres have an equal friendship, in contrast with Wilson's admiration of Rogers and dislike of Bucky Barnes in previous MCU projects, though Torres looks up to Wilson as an inspiration. Mackie gave Ramirez advice on wearing the Falcon costume. Ramirez compared working in the MCU to his experience joining the Top Gun franchise in the film Top Gun: Maverick (2022). That film and its star Tom Cruise inspired Ramirez to ensure the film's flying scenes used the correct body positions and physics.
- Shira Haas as Ruth Bat-Seraph:
  An Israeli former Black Widow who serves as President Ross's security advisor. Moore said the character's perspective on Ross puts her on a collision course with Wilson, and Onah described her as a "great part of the tapestry" of the film's paranoid thriller story. She is briefly seen wearing a suit that resembles the comic book character's white and blue costume, but it is partly concealed under a jacket.
- Carl Lumbly as Isaiah Bradley:
  An African-American Korean War veteran and super soldier who was imprisoned and experimented on by the U.S. government for 30 years. In the film, Samuel Sterns takes control of Bradley's mind and frames him for an assassination attempt on President Ross, leading to Bradley's arrest. This begins further exploration of the injustices that Bradley has faced in his life. He is released and exonerated at the end of the film thanks to Wilson's actions.
- Xosha Roquemore as Leila Taylor:
  A Secret Service agent working for President Ross who has a history with Wilson. Taylor is a romantic interest for Wilson in the comics, but the film does not indicate any romantic interest between the characters.
- Giancarlo Esposito as Seth Voelker / Sidewinder:
  The leader of Serpent, a violent special-ops team. Esposito described Sidewinder as an intelligent "badass". He said the physicality of the role differentiated Sidewinder from his character Gus Fring of the Breaking Bad franchise, who is also an intelligent antagonist, and he was excited to show his physicality on screen. Esposito does not wear a comics-accurate, snake-themed costume in the film, but wanted to feature some references to the comic book costume by including some of the colors from that version in his film costume. Esposito's eyes were also changed to be blue to match the comic version of Sidewinder. Onah and Esposito took inspiration for Sidewinder from the real-life private military company Wagner Group, as well as warlords from Africa who have a "powerful aura that commands the respect and loyalty of [their] followers". Esposito was interested in further exploring Voelker's backstory—an economics professor who became a villain in the comics—in future appearances, given it was not featured in Brave New World.
- Liv Tyler as Betty Ross:
  A cellular biologist and Thaddeus Ross's estranged daughter who resents her father for his obsessive pursuit of Bruce Banner / Hulk years prior. Onah said it was a "no-brainer" to bring Tyler back after so many years since her first appearance in the film The Incredible Hulk (2008), and he said she was central to President Ross's storyline in Brave New World. In the final cut, Betty is often mentioned but she is only heard on a phone call and then briefly appears in one of the last scenes. Onah said they considered including her earlier in the film, but decided to save her for the end to help build Ross's longing to reconnect with Betty.
- Tim Blake Nelson as Samuel Sterns:
  A cellular biologist who was accidentally cross-contaminated with Banner's blood during the events of The Incredible Hulk, gaining superhuman intelligence. Nelson was glad to return to the character after years of disappointment over a sequel to The Incredible Hulk not being produced, and was satisfied with what the writers conceived for what Sterns had been doing since that film, with the character being imprisoned and exploited by Thaddeus Ross. Nelson said portraying Sterns's pathos and rage required him to "grow up" as an actor. Blue Whale Studios created the prosthetic effects for the character's comic-accurate large head, which Nelson had requested to have the "deformation" visible for himself and the other actors to experience on set. Onah noted that the character has different appearances in the comics, with some being more human and others being "incredibly grotesque", and multiple versions were explored for the film. Blue Whale Studios' approach was ultimately changed ahead of the film's reshoots, with the final version leaning into the grotesque side with "parts of his brain seemingly bursting from his skull", one eye glowing green, and the other clouded and seemingly blind; Onah hoped this design still fit the film's grounded tone. Visual effects were used to augment the character's appearance.
- Harrison Ford as Thaddeus Ross / Red Hulk:
  The newly elected president of the United States who wants to work with Captain America. Ross was previously a U.S. Army general and then the U.S. Secretary of State in the MCU. Moore said there are "natural sparks" between Wilson and Ross due to the events of the film Captain America: Civil War (2016), but producer Kevin Feige said their dynamic is changed now that they are Captain America and president, respectively. Ford said similarities between Ross and any real-life presidents were coincidental and his focus was on the character's own history, personality, and circumstances. In the film, Ross wants to "turn a new leaf" and distance himself from his more emotional, volatile past, hoping to reconnect with his daughter Betty. His regression to "the guy he doesn't want to be anymore" is represented by the character's transformation into the monstrous Red Hulk, which is portrayed by Ford through motion capture. Onah and Ford convinced Marvel Studios that Red Hulk should not speak in the film, believing it would undermine the character's emotional storyline if Red Hulk was a "rational being" rather than a "figure of rage and anger". Ford replaces William Hurt, who portrayed Ross in the MCU from 2008 to 2021 before his death in March 2022.

Additionally, Sebastian Stan reprises his MCU role as Bucky Barnes in an uncredited cameo appearance. Barnes is campaigning to be a congressman, setting up his role in the film Thunderbolts* (2025). Also appearing are Jóhannes Haukur Jóhannesson as Copperhead, a large member of Serpent; William Mark McCullough as Dennis Dunphy, a U.S. military commander and ally to Wilson; and Takehiro Hira as Japanese prime minister Ozaki.

== Production ==
=== Development ===
Marvel Studios president Kevin Feige said in October 2015 that Captain America: Civil War (2016) was the conclusion of the Captain America trilogy starring Chris Evans as Steve Rogers / Captain America, after Captain America: The First Avenger (2011) and Captain America: The Winter Soldier (2014). Civil War was Evans's last contracted standalone Captain America film, but he was open to extending his contract beyond the Marvel Cinematic Universe (MCU) crossover films Avengers: Infinity War (2018) and Avengers: Endgame (2019). In January 2021, Evans was reportedly close to signing a deal to return as Rogers in at least one project. Evans's involvement was said to be similar to how fellow MCU star Robert Downey Jr. had supporting roles as Tony Stark / Iron Man in other MCU films following the Iron Man trilogy. Evans said the report was "news to [him]".

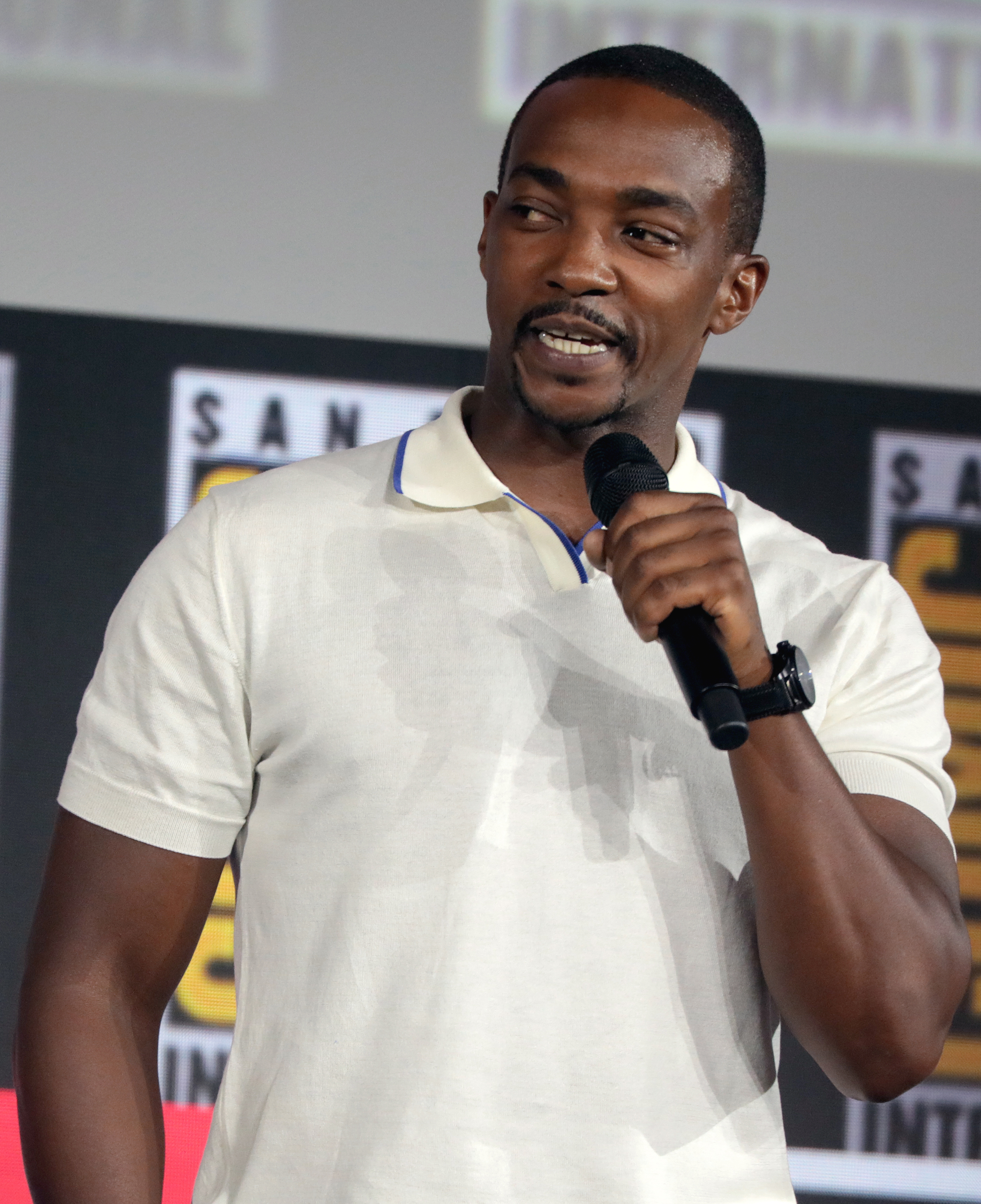
Anthony Mackie at the 2019 San Diego Comic-Con announcing the series The Falcon and the Winter Soldier, in which his character Sam Wilson accepts the mantle of Captain America; this film is a continuation of the series starring Mackie

By October 2018, Marvel Studios was developing a limited series for Disney+ starring Anthony Mackie's Sam Wilson / Falcon and Sebastian Stan's Bucky Barnes / Winter Soldier from the MCU films. Malcolm Spellman was hired as head writer of the series, which was officially announced as The Falcon and the Winter Soldier in April 2019. After Rogers bequeaths his shield and the mantle of Captain America to Wilson in Endgame, the series shows Wilson accepting the mantle and coming to terms with the implications of that as a Black man. Before the series premiered, Mackie said there had been no discussions regarding a second season and he was not sure when he would next appear in an MCU film because of the COVID-19 pandemic. Series director Kari Skogland was also unsure whether there would be a second season, saying she told the story she wanted to with the first season but there were more stories and characters to explore if a second was made. Executive producer Nate Moore said the series had "evergreen" topics that lent themselves to further exploration and set up ideas for a potential second season. Feige said there were ideas for what "another one" could be, but Marvel intended for the series to lead into an MCU film first as they did with fellow Disney+ miniseries WandaVision (2021).

After the series finale of The Falcon and the Winter Soldier, "One World, One People", was released in April 2021, Spellman and series writer Dalan Musson were revealed to be writing a fourth Captain America film that continues Wilson's story. Rob Edwards said he was the original writer for the film. Evans's reported return as Rogers was expected to come in a different project. Mackie said he was unaware of any plans for a film or second season, but was excited to see what happened next and said it would be monumental for him to headline an MCU film, particularly as a Black actor. Mackie negotiated a deal to star in the film over the next few months, and officially signed on in August. He later said he had been excited to make a second season of The Falcon and the Winter Soldier with Stan and their co-star Daniel Brühl—who portrays Helmut Zemo—and was disappointed by the pivot to starring in a film without them.

=== Pre-production ===
Julius Onah was hired to direct the film in July 2022, after several meetings with Moore and co-producer Kyana Davidson in which they discussed character, themes, and tone. Onah was championed to Feige and Mackie by actress Octavia Spencer who starred in his film Luce (2019); Spencer is included in the "special thanks" section of the film's credits. Key elements were set by the time Onah joined. He said it was always going to be "a Sam Wilson story", and Wilson would not be conflicted about being Captain America: "That question has been resolved. Sam is our Captain America now." The characters Samuel Sterns and Thaddeus Ross who were first introduced in the second MCU film, The Incredible Hulk (2008), were also set to appear. The inclusion of Sterns was one of the reasons Onah was interested in the film, feeling that someone who operates from intellect would be a good adversary for Wilson. Onah was drawn to the relationships between Wilson and Ross, and between Wilson and Joaquin Torres / Falcon who was introduced in The Falcon and the Winter Soldier. As Onah further developed the film with Spellman and Musson, they also leaned into Wilson's relationship with another The Falcon and the Winter Soldier character, Isaiah Bradley. Onah felt these three relationships were integral to Wilson's journey in the film, connecting to his past and future. Isaiah's grandson Eli was included in early versions of the script, but was removed due to the large number of characters in the film and the focus on other relationships. Onah said the combination of Wilson, Ross, and Sterns organically led to the film's thriller tone, with elements of paranoid thrillers, political thrillers, and action thrillers. It was described as more grounded than some recent MCU films, closer to the tone of The Winter Soldier.

The filmmakers always intended to bring back Stan for a scene with Barnes and Wilson together, but this was kept secret until the film's release. Onah said there was "no way we were gonna completely divorce these two characters from each other" after The Falcon and the Winter Soldier. Several different places in the film were considered before they settled on a moment where Barnes provides emotional support for Wilson later in the film. Another element planned before Onah joined was the Serpent Society, a group of snake-themed villains from the comics. This paid off a joke Marvel made years earlier when announcing the third Captain America film as Captain America: Serpent Society, before revealing its true subtitle to be Civil War. Moore acknowledged that the team can come across as "goofy", but he considered them to be part of Captain America's "all-time Hall of Fame villain groups" and wanted to treat them seriously. Onah said their challenge in developing the film was trying to fit the different elements into the intended thriller tone. He added that despite the connections to The Incredible Hulk and The Falcon and the Winter Soldier, they wanted the film to work on its own. Mackie said viewers did not need to have seen The Incredible Hulk to watch the film, calling it a "reset" of the MCU that establishes new themes and antagonists for the universe moving forward. Onah said it was important to call back to The Incredible Hulk as part of Ross's story, but he wanted these elements to be revealed through Wilson's point of view.

Later in July 2022 at San Diego Comic-Con, the film's title was revealed to be Captain America: New World Order and it was given a release date of May 3, 2024, making it part of Phase Five of the MCU. The subtitle, which is also the name of the first episode of The Falcon and the Winter Soldier, was noted for its use in politics, professional wrestling, and various conspiracy theories along with antisemitic rhetoric, and was deemed to be a controversial choice. Several cast members were announced at the D23 Expo that September: Danny Ramirez as Joaquin Torres / Falcon and Carl Lumbly as Isaiah Bradley, both reprising their roles from The Falcon and the Winter Soldier; Tim Blake Nelson as Samuel Sterns, returning from The Incredible Hulk; and Israeli actress Shira Haas as the comic book character Sabra. Onah said filming would begin in early 2023.

The announcement that Sabra, an Israeli superheroine, would be adapted for the film led to criticisms from some people who believed this would lead to negative stereotypical portrayals of Palestinians and Arabs; in the comics, Sabra is a member of the Mossad and some of the Arab characters she interacts with were perceived to be misogynistic, antisemitic, and violent. The name "Sabra" also has different meanings to Israeli Jews and Palestinians. The Palestinian Campaign for the Academic and Cultural Boycott of Israel criticized the use of the character and called the comic book version's "valorization of Mossad" and perceived racism against Palestinians "sickening". Yousef Munayyer, a Palestinian-American writer and analyst, felt the character could not have a positive role in the film based on her depiction in the comics and said turning Israeli spies into heroes was "insensitive and disgraceful". In response, Marvel Studios said the film was taking a new approach to the character, just as other comics characters had been re-imagined for modern audiences when brought into the MCU. This led to concerns from some other groups that Marvel was "erasing" the character's Israeli background, which the American Jewish Committee (AJC) compared to "making Captain America Canadian". In the film, the character is a former Black Widow and high-ranking U.S. government official named Ruth Bat-Seraph. The name Sabra is not used, nor is she a mutant or Mossad agent, but the character is depicted as a first-generation Israeli, has an Israeli accent, and Moore said she has the "attitude" and the "essence" of the comics character. He reiterated that the character's backstory was not changed in response to public concerns, and explained that using the Black Widow program to adapt characters who Marvel Studios "didn't want to translate as one-to-one" from the comics was a general idea that came up during the making of the film Black Widow (2021). The character's inclusion prompted some calls to boycott the film, in part due to the Gaza war; some supporters of Israel took issue with the character having allegiance to the U.S. government, while some who are critical of Israel protested the film's use of the character due to her depiction in the comics. With confirmation that the character would still be depicted as Israeli in the film, the AJC and the Anti-Defamation League (ADL) both praised the decision.

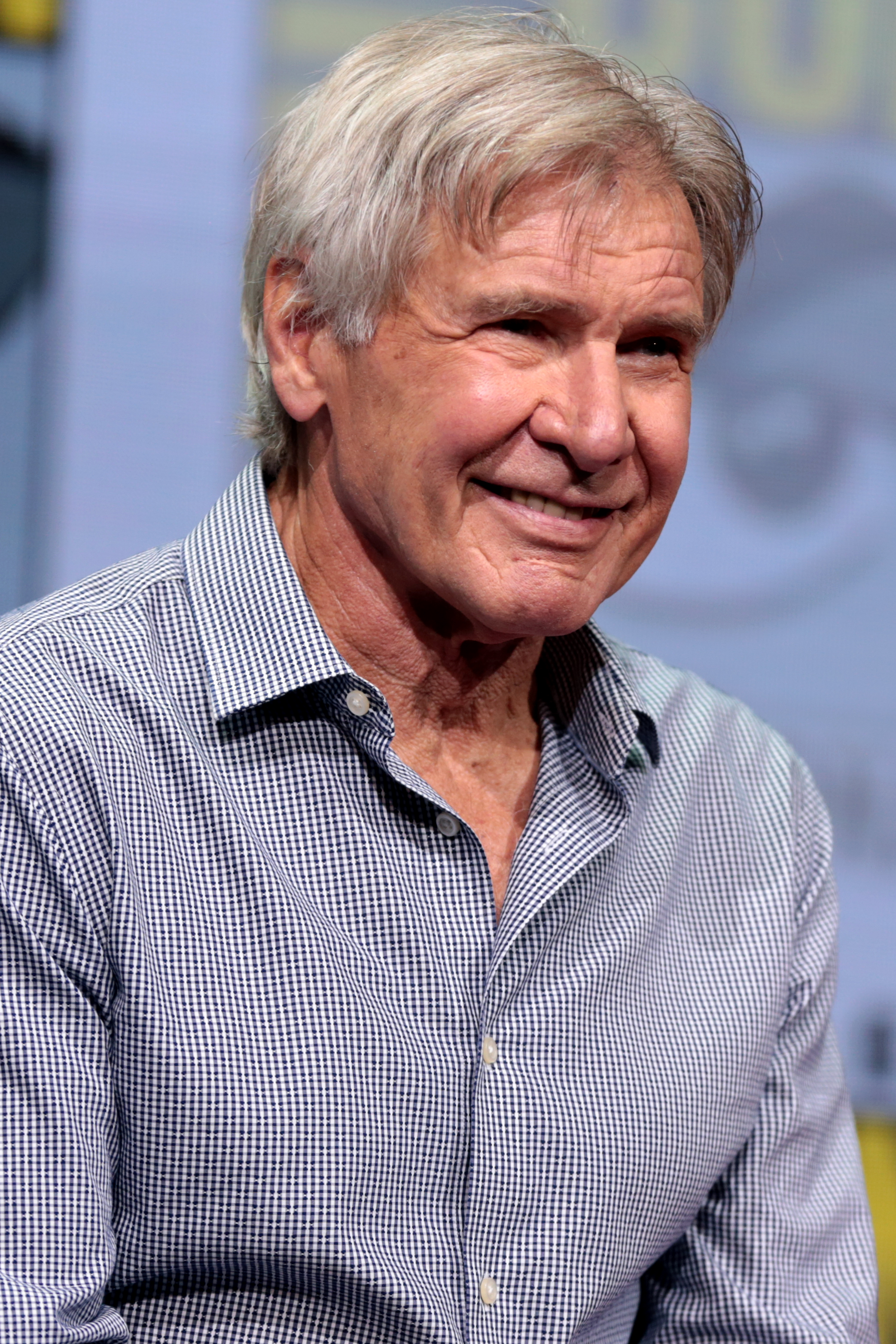
Harrison Ford plays new U.S. president Thaddeus Ross in the film, replacing William Hurt who portrayed Ross in the MCU until his death in March 2022.

In October 2022, Moore was revealed to be producing New World Order alongside Feige. Harrison Ford was cast as Thaddeus Ross that month, replacing William Hurt who portrayed the character in the MCU until his death in March 2022. Ford was reported to be appearing as Ross in this film as well as the following MCU film Thunderbolts* (2025). Marvel Studios planned for Ross to transform into Red Hulk in the film. Referencing the character's history of hunting for Bruce Banner / Hulk, Moore said: "Turning a guy who hunted Hulks into a Hulk himself makes him more than an antagonist; it makes him a tragic character." The studio informed Hurt of their plans to have Ross become Red Hulk and he had been eager to portray that aspect of the character. They considered changing course with Ross's role in the film following Hurt's death, believing no actor would want to take over from him. During that time, Ford reached out to Feige about possibly joining the MCU and agreed to take on the role without seeing a script. Ford saw playing Ross as an opportunity to honor what Hurt had done with the character and also continue with a character arc that he had enjoyed from the previous films. In the film, Ross becomes the president of the United States and finds himself at odds with Wilson amidst a global conspiracy. Moore drew comparisons to the 1974 comic book storyline Secret Empire. He noted that Wilson wears a costume featuring the colors of the American flag while facing off with the U.S. president, and said the film's story was about "the notion of a guy who believes an ideal, realizing that ideal is not always held up to the same standards by other people, and feeling really betrayed by where the American government [has] gone". Onah drew comparisons to Ford's film Clear and Present Danger (1994), which features a similar conspiracy involving the president. He wanted to feature themes of bringing people together and focusing on shared experiences, believing these were central to Captain America and Sam Wilson's character, which he thought had "political resonance" but was more about humanity than politics. Marvel Studios was supportive of this, despite Feige joking about Onah trying to "save America" with the film.

Pre-production work at Trilith Studios in Atlanta, Georgia, began on November 7 ahead of a planned filming start in March 2023. Onah directed cinematographer Kramer Morgenthau, production designer Ramsey Avery, and costume designer Gersha Phillips to be specific about how they used the color red in the film, avoiding it in many scenes to make the appearance of Red Hulk at the end of the film more impactful. When red is used in earlier scenes, it is to signify "chaos" while blue tones represent "peacefulness and a sense of things being under control". Avery, who worked on the MCU films Guardians of the Galaxy Vol. 2 (2017) and Spider-Man: Homecoming (2017), reiterated that their intent was for the film to be more grounded in reality than recent MCU films. He said it was important to Onah and Feige that the film feel like it was taking place in "the current space... a very real and honest world". Mackie's Captain America costume was redesigned from the one seen in The Falcon and the Winter Soldier, which was based on the mostly-white costume that Wilson is known for wearing as Captain America in the comics. The new costume for Brave New World is mostly dark blue, with red and white accents, closer to the costumes Evans wore in The Winter Soldier and other films. The cowl that Mackie wore for The Falcon and the Winter Soldier was removed at his request, as he struggled with "the heat, the sweat, the fogged-up glasses" and said it was his "worst nightmare". Ryan Meinerding, Marvel Studios' head of visual development, worked on the costume.

Xosha Roquemore joined the cast in January 2023. Mackie expected to begin work on March 1. That month, Washington, D.C.'s Office of Cable Television, Film, Music and Entertainment said Marvel Studios would be filming in the city in June. Also in early 2023, Onah reached out to Liv Tyler about reprising her role as Ross's daughter Betty from The Incredible Hulk; Tyler was confirmed to be returning soon after filming began.

=== Filming ===
Principal photography began on March 21, 2023, at Trilith Studios in Atlanta, Georgia, with Kramer Morgenthau as cinematographer. The film was made under the working title Rochelle Rochelle, a reference to the television series Seinfeld (1989–1998) that was suggested by Davidson. Morgenthau, who worked on the MCU film Thor: The Dark World (2013), said they wanted to pay homage to the visuals of thriller films from the 1970s such as Klute (1971), The Day of the Jackal (1973), The Parallax View (1974), and All the President's Men (1976). Wanting a look as close to photographic film as could be achieved with digital cameras, they tested with vintage anamorphic lenses and made a set of rules for camera movement, color, composition, and texture. Early in filming, there was a week of character-focused scenes featuring Mackie, Ramirez, and Ford; Ramirez's first scene was the film's final moment between Wilson and Torres. At the end of March, Julia Louis-Dreyfus was reported to be reprising her MCU role as Valentina Allegra de Fontaine in the film.

Onah wanted the action scenes to be "grounded and tactile", and give Wilson things to do that were not seen in his previous appearances. While Wilson is at "peak human performance" and aided by technology, Onah kept in mind that the character does not have superpowers. The start of the 2023 Writers Guild of America strike in May was not expected to impact the film's production, with Marvel Studios reportedly planning to shoot what they could during principal photography and make any necessary writing adjustments during the film's already scheduled reshoots. Later in May, set photos revealed that Seth Rollins was part of the cast and led to speculation that he was portraying a member of the Serpent Society. In June, Marvel Studios announced the new title Captain America: Brave New World. Jeremy Mathai at /Film praised the change, saying it "strikes a far more optimistic perspective [than New World Order], doubling as a commentary on the future of the famous superhero in the Marvel Cinematic Universe and as a statement on some very overdue representation". The change was also deemed wise by Collider's Hilary Remley, who noted that the original title could have been interpreted as having antisemitic connotations. Moore explained that Marvel Studios felt New World Order was "really interesting, and sort of moody and scary" for a subtitle and was not intended to represent real-world issues. The studio decided to change the title after receiving feedback about how the phrase "New World Order" had been "co-opted in the real world in a way that made people uncomfortable". At the time of the new subtitle's announcement, Onah was revealed to have co-written the script. The film's release date was soon delayed to July 26, 2024.

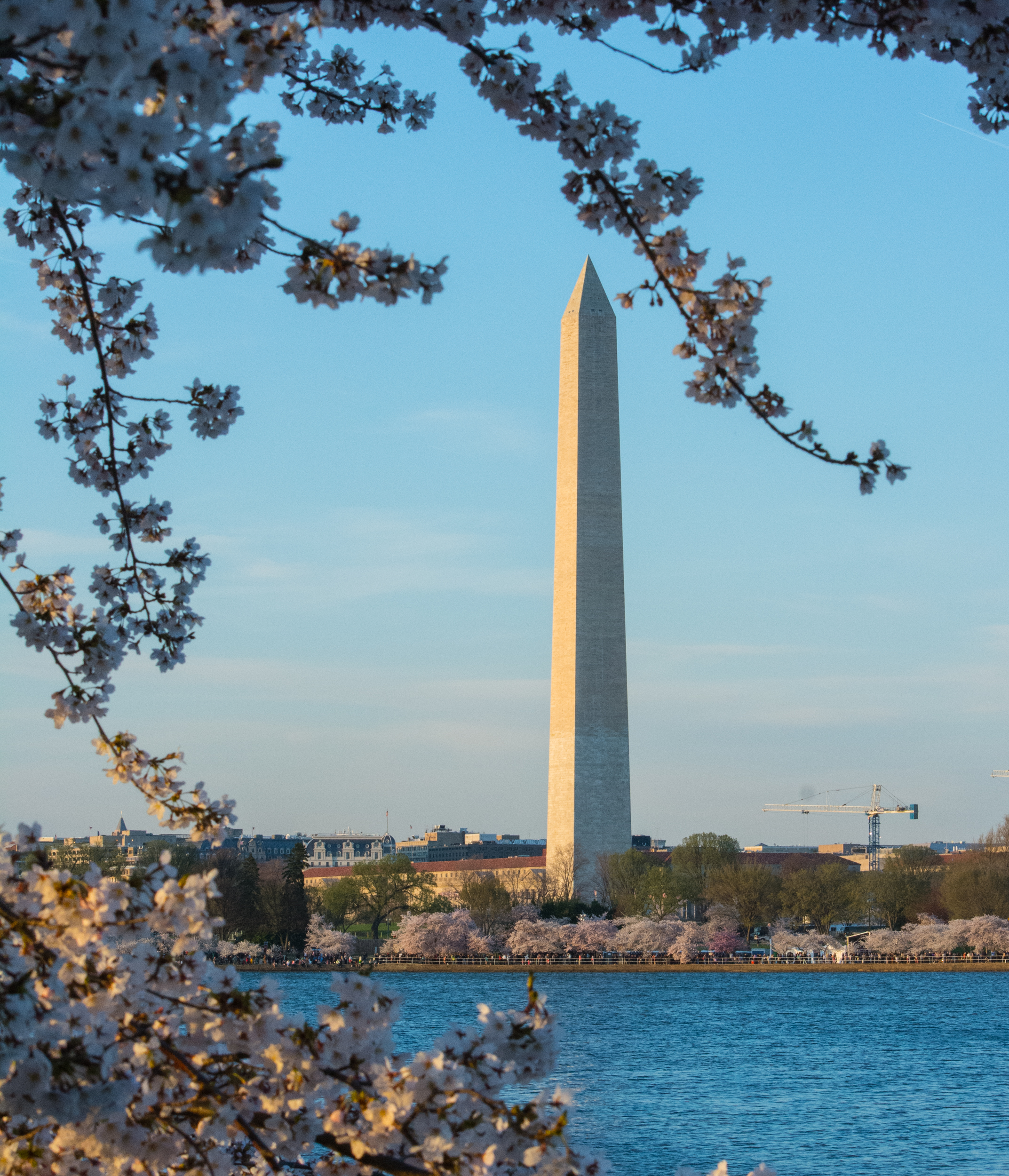
Location filming took place in Washington, D.C., and the city's cherry blossom trees are seen throughout the film.

Onah said Washington, D.C., was an important location for the film because it is where Ross is based as president of the U.S., but also because it is where Wilson was first introduced to the MCU in The Winter Soldier, and it is close to Isaiah's home in Baltimore, Maryland. The cherry blossom trees that are planted around D.C. are featured throughout the film, including during Wilson's climactic fight with Red Hulk. Onah said he had vivid memories of the cherry blossoms from the time he lived near D.C. in Arlington, Virginia, as a child, and to him they aligned with the film's themes of empathy since they were gifts to the U.S. from Japan. Several D.C. locations were recreated by the production at Trilith Studios, including the Oval Office, the White House Rose Garden, the White House bunker, and Hains Point. Filming also took place at a replica of the White House at Tyler Perry Studios, also in Atlanta. The recreated locations included a mixture of practical and digital cherry blossom trees. At the end of June, filming moved to D.C. for a week of location shooting. Mackie said this brought his MCU experience "full circle", with the production staying at the same hotel and filming in the same areas as they did for The Winter Soldier. Filming for Brave New World wrapped on June 30.

=== Post-production ===
By October 2023, there was potential for Brave New World to return to its May 2024 release date because it was further along in production than Marvel Studios' Deadpool & Wolverine (2024), which had taken over that date. However, this was considered unlikely, and Brave New World's release was instead delayed to February 14, 2025, following the 2023 SAG-AFTRA strike's conclusion in November 2023. Journalist Jeff Sneider reported that the film was not received well in an early test screening, that three major sequences were being cut, and that extensive reshoots were planned from January 2024 until that May or June. In December, Matthew Orton was hired to write additional material for the reshoots, which were then scheduled to last from early-to-mid-2024. Orton previously worked on the Marvel Studios miniseries Moon Knight (2022). The same day, Rosa Salazar was revealed to have been cast in the film, and was later reported to be portraying Diamondback, a member of the Serpent Society. This confirmed speculation that she was playing the character based on her appearance in set photos.

Mark Ruffalo stated in February 2024 that he was reprising his MCU role as Bruce Banner / Hulk in the film. Adam B. Vary of Variety soon reported that Ruffalo was not appearing in the film, explaining that the actor had misspoken when he was asked about the film and had just intended to express enthusiasm for its upcoming release. Vary noted that there had been ongoing speculation about Ruffalo potentially appearing in the film due to the number of characters from The Incredible Hulk already included and Ross's transformation into Red Hulk. Onah said they considered including Ruffalo, but felt this would take away from Wilson's story.

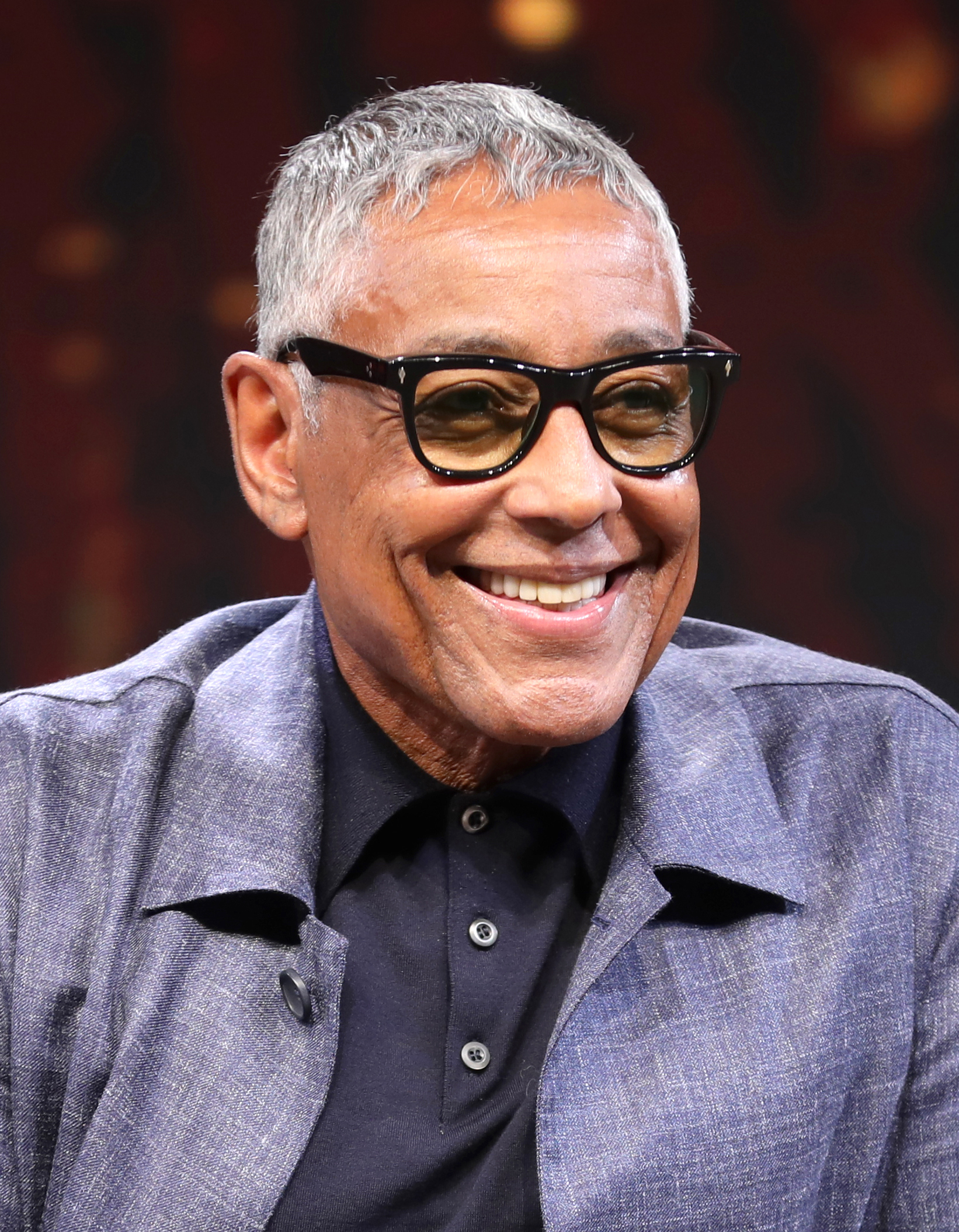
Giancarlo Esposito joined the film as Sidewinder, leader of the Serpent Society, during reshoots that began in May 2024. His casting was part of efforts to refine the film's political thriller tone and also bring more gravitas to the Serpent Society team.

Giancarlo Esposito revealed in May 2024 that he had been cast in an MCU role and would be appearing "sooner rather than later", with his character being teased in a film before a bigger role in an MCU television series. He was confirmed to be appearing in Brave New World at the end of the month as part of the reshoots, which began at that time in Atlanta and were scheduled to last for 22 days. These were expected to be less extensive than the reshoots for the MCU films Doctor Strange in the Multiverse of Madness (2022) and The Marvels (2023), focusing on new action sequences and integrating Esposito. Brave New World was also expected to be much less expensive than The Marvels, which cost more than $300 million; the budget for Brave New World was reported to be $180 million. Nelson returned to Atlanta for reshoots in June, and said they redid much of his original work. Mackie characterized the reshoots as just adding a few additional scenes to enhance the film and said there was no "retooling or remaking". Moore said the reshoots were focused on creating the "perfect political thriller tone", and the casting of Esposito was part of this. He believed the actor made the film more grounded despite his "heightened" material, similar to his role in the television series The Mandalorian (2019–2023). Ford and Takehiro Hira also participated in the reshoots. The film's post-credits scene, in which Wilson is warned about coming threats from the multiverse, was filmed during reshoots. Onah explained that they waited until writing on upcoming MCU films had restarted following the writers' strike before they determined an appropriate tease for future projects.

Esposito announced in July 2024 that he was portraying Seth Voelker / Sidewinder, leader of the Serpent Society, and said he would return for additional reshoots in mid-November. Moore originally told Esposito that he would play King Cobra, and the actor enjoyed the notion of an African-American man being called "King", but the filmmakers ultimately decided that he would portray Sidewinder instead, in part because Sidewinder is the founder of the Serpent Society in the comics. Some of King Cobra's characteristics from the comics were given to Sidewinder for the film. The remains of Tiamut—the Celestial whose emergence on Earth was halted by the Eternals in the MCU film Eternals (2021)—were also revealed to be a focus of the film's story, allowing the introduction of the fictional metal adamantium to the MCU. Moore said Marvel Studios had been waiting to address Tiamut's remains in a story that could make the "best use" of them. Onah said the prior Captain America films had been used to establish aspects of the MCU, and they felt it was interesting to introduce adamantium as a "geopolitical football". The film originally ended with a climactic action scene on Tiamut's remains, referred to as "Celestial Island", but this was reworked. A dogfight near the island featuring multiple countries was also simplified to just feature the United States and Japan. Onah originally filmed the sequence in a thriller-inspired style like other scenes, but they found the action needed more camera movement and intensity. Jóhannes Haukur Jóhannesson was revealed to be part of the cast in December, when Marvel credited the film's story to Spellman & Musson and Edwards, with the screenplay credited to Onah & Peter Glanz and Orton. The final writing credits were revealed the next month: Edwards received screenplay credit alongside Spellman & Musson and Onah & Glanz, with the story credited to the former three. Additional off-screen literary material was attributed to Orton.

Also in January 2025, Rollins said he would no longer be appearing in the film following the reshoots. Salazar's scenes as Diamondback were also cut. Onah said the film was "taking a swing" with its depiction of the Serpent Society and they felt this aspect needed to be "refined" to align better with the film's thriller tone. He said they decided to move away from the more comic-accurate versions of Serpent Society members portrayed by Rollins and Salazar, and the film's reshoot dates also clashed with a different project Salazar was working on. Both actors were replaced by Esposito, who serves the same purpose in the film's story but with a more grounded tone. Onah felt Esposito's inclusion was a "no-brainer" once he became available, and thought the actor brought the right level of gravitas to the film and the Serpent Society team, which is just called "Serpent" in the film. Jóhannesson plays another member of the group, Copperhead, alongside Esposito. Moore compared the group, described as a "violent special-ops team", to the more grounded version of the comic book character Batroc the Leaper that is introduced in The Winter Soldier portrayed by Georges St-Pierre. Onah said Esposito's role was "great setup" for further appearances of the Serpent Society in the MCU. Addressing public interest in the changes made to the film during reshoots, Onah said they were a natural part of the film's development and he pushed back against speculation that came from leaks and reports that he said were inaccurate. An example of this was speculation that Ross was originally supposed to die in the film, based on set photos and early trailer footage showing a funeral scene that was cut from the film. Onah said there was "never a version where he explicitly died", but there were versions of the film in which his fate was left unknown to the public. Onah added that Red Hulk is a "fan favorite character" from the comics, and said it is "not very easy for a Hulk to perish".

The original prosthetic design for Samuel Sterns by Blue Whale Studios (L) and the character's appearance in the final film (R). This design was one of the many changes to the film during its reshoots.

Matthew Schmidt and Madeleine Gavin edited the film; Schmidt previously worked on The Winter Soldier and Civil War. Brave New World is the first MCU film to not feature an animated Marvel Studios opening logo, instead presenting the studio's logo in "no-nonsense black-and-white" without a traditional musical fanfare. Bill Westenhofer was the film's initial visual effects supervisor, but left the project to work on the film Moana (2026) and was replaced with Alessandro Ongaro. Visual effects were provided by Wētā FX, Digital Domain, Luma Pictures, Barnstorm VFX, UPP, OPSIS, and Outpost VFX. Digital Domain worked on the Celestial Island sequence. The same digital model for Tiamut from Eternals was used, but they "scaled it down a little".

Wētā FX designed Red Hulk with Meinerding. Wētā visual effects supervisor Dan Cox said they did not want the character to just look like a color-swapped version of the Hulk. They hoped to make him more intimidating than the Hulk, with a more upright, athletic posture. Onah wanted the character to feel more tactical and methodical due to Ross's military background, and referenced a bear for poses where the character is on all fours. Ford's facial features were incorporated into the design based on scans of his face. The climactic confrontation between Red Hulk and Captain America in D.C. has more than 300 visual effects shots. Ford and a stunt double provided motion capture for the character. Ongaro said Ross's transformation into Red Hulk was originally meant to look more "disgusting. You could see the skin tearing and breaking on his hand, bones popping off", but they decided to pull back on that aspect. They also planned to show the full transition from Red Hulk back to Ross, but Onah felt it broke the "peacefulness" of the moment and instead chose to focus on his shadow during the transition. For Sterns, who also features a monstrous look, Onah said they always intended to use visual effects to augment the practical effects that were used on set. Ongaro said the practical effects for Sterns were replaced with an "all-[computer-generated] approach" by Luma.

== Music ==
Laura Karpman was announced as the film's composer in August 2024. She previously composed the music for the MCU series What If...? (2021–2024) and Ms. Marvel (2022), and the film The Marvels. Karpman wrote a new heroic theme that represents Wilson, Torres, and Bradley, and an Aaron Copland-inspired piano theme for Ross. The latter evolves into a "Godzilla monster thing" when Ross transforms into Red Hulk. The film's thriller aspects are scored with "conspiracy music" that Karpman compared to the Mission: Impossible franchise. She also included a subtle reference to Alan Silvestri's "Captain America March" from the previous films. Nora Kroll-Rosenbaum, who worked with Karpman on What If...?, provided additional music for the film. A soundtrack album featuring their music was released by Hollywood Records and Marvel Music on February 12, 2025. At that time, Mackie said the film's "title-song" had been provided by Kendrick Lamar, which was interpreted by some as Lamar having written a new song for the film. However, it is his 2014 song "I" that is played over the film's end credits. Additionally, the 1959 song "Mr. Blue" by the Fleetwoods is heard throughout the film as a trigger for characters being mind-controlled by Sterns; this is a reference to his "Mr. Blue" alias in The Incredible Hulk.

== Marketing ==
Feige and Mackie revealed the first footage from the film, focusing on Wilson meeting with Thaddeus Ross, at CinemaCon in April 2024. The following month, McDonald's began selling Happy Meals with toys based on characters from the film, including Red Hulk and Diamondback. Stephanie Kaloi at TheWrap noted that these characters had not been confirmed for the film by Marvel at that time, and the early reveal was likely due to the film's release being delayed but the marketing partnership with McDonald's not being pushed back to match. More footage from the film was shown at a CineEurope panel in June teasing Disney's theatrical slate.

A teaser trailer was released in July which drew comparisons to The Winter Soldier's tone, with Jennifer Ouellette of Ars Technica describing it as "half-superhero movie, half-political thriller". The appearance of Red Hulk and the character's potential true identity were both widely discussed; Adam Chitwood at TheWrap wondered if rumors of Thaddeus Ross becoming Red Hulk were a red herring. The Verge's Charles Pulliam-Moore questioned if the film being a continuation of The Falcon and the Winter Soldier would be difficult for general audiences to follow. Conversely, Sandy Schaefer and Chris Evangelista from /Film felt the film would not rely much on the series to have wider audience appeal. They called the trailer "pretty good" considering the film's recently completed reshoots, noting that it largely contains action rather than plot details. Commentators also noted the reveal that the remains of Tiamut would be featured in the film, after the Emergence had largely been ignored in MCU projects since Eternals. Michael McWhertor at Polygon noted that the trailer shows the United States and other countries meeting at a Global Unity Summit to discuss the Celestial, with a stylized version of Tiamut's hand being used as a logo for the summit. Later in July, Marvel released an updated version of the teaser for distribution in theaters that removed Isaiah Bradley's assassination attempt on Thaddeus Ross. This came following the attempted assassination of Donald Trump in Pennsylvania that month.

Also in July 2024, Feige and members of the cast promoted the film at San Diego Comic-Con. More footage was shown, Esposito's role was announced, and Thaddeus Ross was confirmed to be the character who transforms into Red Hulk. Similar footage was also shown at the 2024 D23 Expo. Following online leaks of the San Diego Comic-Con and D23 footage, Marvel released an official look at Red Hulk within their video celebrating the company's 85th anniversary in August. A full trailer for the film debuted at D23 Brasil in November and was also released online. After the teases of Red Hulk in previously released footage, the trailer features Ross's transformation into Red Hulk and shots of the character fighting Wilson. Several commentators noted the trailer's unique style, featuring "creepy black lines", split-screen shots, and a flickering text effect. Comparisons were drawn to political thriller films such as The Day of the Jackal, The Parallax View, and All the President's Men, as well as The Candidate (1972), JFK (1991), and The Constant Gardener (2005). Jordan King at Empire questioned whether Brave New World would live up to these comparisons, but said it was a promising sign that the film was "looking to place itself in conversation" with those previous films.

Marvel Studios partnered with Tide's "Collateral Stains" promotional campaign to release a series of commercials for the film in January 2025. These feature Gregg Turkington reprising his role of Baskin-Robbins store manager Dale from the MCU films Ant-Man (2015) and Ant-Man and the Wasp: Quantumania (2023). For the three weeks leading up to the film's premiere, Disney was said to be making a "final and biggest marketing" push for it. At a press event in Italy at the end of January, Mackie said Captain America represented values like "honor, dignity and integrity" rather than America itself. He received backlash from some online commenters who labeled the film "anti-American" and woke. Mackie soon added, "I'm a proud American and taking on the shield of a hero like Cap is the honor of a lifetime... Cap has universal characteristics that people all over the world can relate to." James Hibberd of The Hollywood Reporter said Evans made similar statements when playing the character and the actors were likely directed by Marvel to focus on Captain America's "universal qualities" to avoid any jingoistic connotations while promoting internationally. Hibberd also discussed the film's other controversies—similarities between Thaddeus Ross and the newly re-elected President Donald Trump, the original New World Order subtitle, opposing views on the inclusion and portrayal of Ruth Bat-Seraph, and "ugly" criticisms related to Mackie being Black—but said these did not appear to have impacted the film's box office performance based on early projections. Coinciding with the film's release in February, concept art by Meinderding of the film's Captain America costume and design for Red Hulk were used as variant covers for Marvel Comics' Sam Wilson, Captain America #2 and Red Hulk #1.

== Release ==
=== Theatrical ===
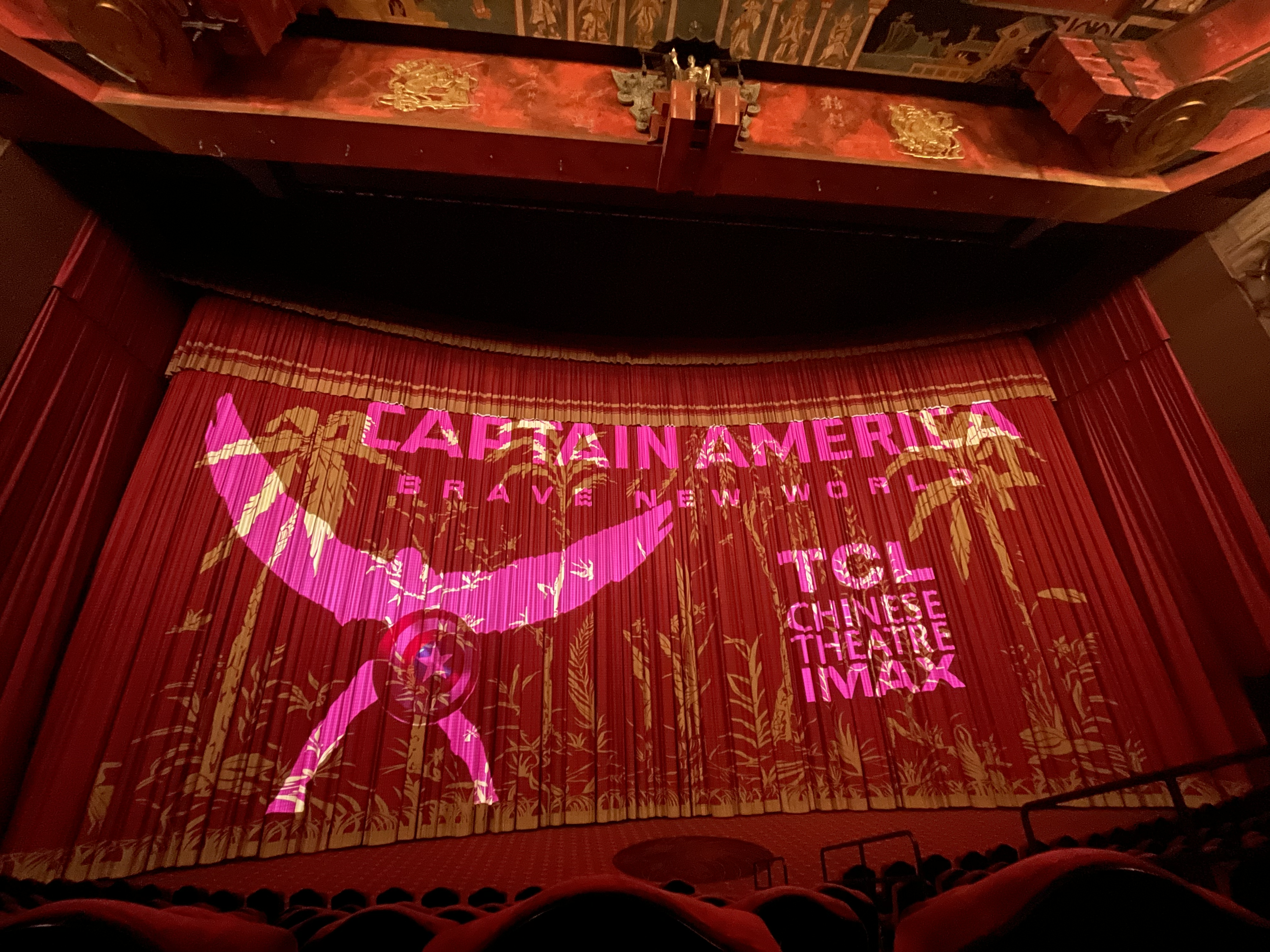
A showing of Captain America: Brave New World at the TCL Chinese Theatre in Hollywood

Captain America: Brave New World premiered at the TCL Chinese Theatre in Hollywood, Los Angeles, on February 11, 2025, and was released in the United States on February 14, in IMAX. The film was previously scheduled for May 3, 2024, and then July 26, 2024, before it was pushed to the February 2025 release date following the 2023 SAG-AFTRA strike. It is part of Phase Five of the MCU.

=== Home media ===
Captain America: Brave New World was released for digital download on April 15, 2025, and was released on Ultra HD Blu-ray, Blu-ray, and DVD on May 13. The home media releases include deleted scenes, a gag reel, and featurettes. The film was released on Disney+ on May 28.

In the United Kingdom, Captain America: Brave New World debuted at No. 2 on the Official Film Chart for the week ending April 23, then moved to third place the following week. It later reached No. 1 for the week ending May 21, becoming the top-selling home entertainment release.

In the United States, following its PVOD release, Captain America: Brave New World topped the Fandango at Home digital chart for the week ending April 20, which ranks titles based on revenue from premium digital rentals and sales. It also secured the No. 2 position on Amazon Prime Video's digital charts on April 22. The film later ranked second on Fandango at Home's Top 10 titles for the week ending April 27, before moving to third place for the week ending May 4. On physical media, Captain America: Brave New World debuted at No. 1 on the Circana VideoScan combined DVD and Blu-ray sales chart, as well as on the dedicated Blu-ray and 4K Ultra HD charts, for the week ended May 17. High-definition formats accounted for 71% of first-week sales, with 32% from regular Blu-ray and 39% from 4K Ultra HD editions. It moved to No. 2 on both the combined DVD and Blu-ray chart and the dedicated Blu-ray chart for the week ended May 31, after spending two weeks at No. 1, while remaining the top-selling title on the 4K Ultra HD chart. Through October 2025, Captain America: Brave New World ranked fifth in year-to-date disc sales on Circana's VideoScan chart. For the year, Captain America: Brave New World placed ninth on the Top Selling Titles on Disc (DVD and Blu-ray combined) of 2025, according to Circana VideoScan. It recorded a sales index of 37.24 relative to the year's top-selling title. Blu-ray formats accounted for 61% of total unit sales, including a 28% share from 4K Ultra HD. The film also ranked eighth on the Top Selling Blu-ray Discs of 2025 and twelfth on the Top Selling 4K Ultra HD Blu-rays of 2025.

Analytics company Samba TV, which gathers viewership data from certain smart TVs and content providers, announced that Captain America: Brave New World was the second most-streamed film and the eighth most-streamed title overall in the United States between May 26 to June 1. JustWatch, a guide to streaming content with access to data from more than 45 million users around the world, reported that it was the fifth most-streamed film in the country during the same period. Nielsen Media Research, which records streaming viewership on certain U.S. television screens, announced that Captain America: Brave New World was streamed for 750 million minutes from May 26 to June 1. It was the most-streamed film in the country during that week. In the following week, from June 2–8, the film recorded 304 million minutes of watch time, making it the sixth most-streamed film for that period.

== Reception ==
=== Box office ===
Captain America: Brave New World grossed $200.5 million in the United States and Canada, and $214.6 million in other territories, for a worldwide total of $415.1 million. Deadline Hollywood reported that the film needed to earn $425 million worldwide to break even, taking into account the reported production budget of $180 million as well as marketing costs. Feige attributed the film's low box-office performance to the absence of Steve Rogers actor Chris Evans, who had headlined the three previous Captain America films.

In the United States and Canada, the film was released alongside Paddington in Peru and was projected to gross $80–94 million from 4,105 theaters in its four-day opening weekend. Tracking service Quorum reported early box office estimates for the film in mid-January 2025, projecting that it would earn $86–$95 million during its opening weekend and more than $100 million across the four-day weekend from Valentine's Day to Presidents' Day. This was similar to The Winter Soldier's $95 million opening weekend in 2014. Further tracking, reported later in January, similarly indicated an opening of at least $90 million. The film grossed $40 million on its opening day, including an estimated $12 million from Thursday previews. It debuted to $88.8 million, and a total of $100 million over the four-day frame, topping the box office. In its second weekend, it retained the top spot at the box office and grossed $28.2 million, a 68% drop that ranked as the third-worst for the MCU after The Marvels (−78%) and Ant-Man and the Wasp: Quantumania (−70%). The film made $14.9 million in its third weekend, remaining atop the box office, before being dethroned in its fourth by newcomer Mickey 17. Outside the United States and Canada, the film grossed $92.4 million from 52 overseas markets in its opening weekend. The top five international markets were China ($10.5 million), the UK ($8.5 million), Mexico ($6.6 million), Korea ($5.6 million), and France ($4.7 million).

=== Critical response ===
Captain America: Brave New World received mixed reviews from critics, who were divided on the film's story, connections to other MCU projects, and visual effects. The overall reception was also described as unfavorable, negative, and mixed-to-negative. The performances, particularly those of Mackie and Ford, received praise. On review aggregator Rotten Tomatoes, 46% of 367 critics gave Brave New World a positive review, with an average rating of 5.4/10. The critics consensus reads, "Anthony Mackie capably takes up Cap's mantle and shield, but Brave New World is too routine and overstuffed with uninteresting Easter eggs to feel like a worthy standalone adventure for this new Avengers leader." Metacritic summarized the critical response as "mixed or average", based on a weighted average score of 42 out of 100 from 56 critics. Audiences polled by CinemaScore gave the film an average grade of "B–" on an A+ to F scale, the lowest grade for an MCU film to date, and PostTrak reported a "mixed bag" average rating of three stars out of five.

The political subject matter was a subject of critical commentary. Frank Scheck at The Hollywood Reporter remarked that the scene where Ross transformed into Red Hulk and caused havoc across Washington, D.C. seemed like a fantasy of real-world United States president Donald Trump; David Ehrlich of IndieWire agreed with parallels between Ross and Trump's "Make America Great Again" rhetoric, citing both being gruff old men elevated to office based on the promise of facilitating unity based on dealing with an "alien" threat. The Independent's Adam White said that while Ross / Red Hulk could be interpreted as a Trump pastiche, this was ultimately unlikely as the film refused to establish a political stance, with subplots regarding politics remaining underused. Rolling Stone's David Fear joked that Ross was "somehow still only the second-most destructive, rage-filled commander in chief to ever hold office", and Entertainment Weekly writer Maureen Lee Lenker joked that "the most unbelievable part is a U.S. president with empathy, a sense of responsibility for his actions, and a capacity for change". Brandon Yu of The New York Times wrote that "the only wisps of tangible political intrigue to be found" were either unintended, or from allusions to previous subject matter in Falcon and the Winter Soldier. Other commentary concerned the controversial Bat-Seraph character, with PJ Grisar at The Forward writing that the controversy about the character relating to Israel and Gaza did not matter because the film overall was "honestly such a dog's breakfast" in terms of politics and presentation, while /Film's Devin Meenan opined that the character's debut could not have been timed more poorly because of the divisiveness of public opinion inherent in the ongoing conflict.

The characterization and narrative were criticized. Molly Freeman, writing for Screen Rant, claimed that the only purpose of Sam's suit switch from white to blue was to sell more toys, pointing this out as an example of the film featuring elements without "flare" nor concern for furthering its story or characters; Yu likewise wrote that it amounted to the genre of the "action-figure commercial". Vulture's Bilge Ebiri wrote that the film marked Marvel's turn into a "giant slop machine", opining that the film's bid to create sincerity came off as phony and that the jokes to cut this up were "lame", while Scheck agreed that humor was "in severely short supply" and that Mackie's "reliable" charisma was lacking. TheWrap's William Bibbiani wrote that the film was unoriginal and without emotional depth, even in the "few" moments where Wilson made an emotional connection to the film, as these moments only "rehashed" the plot of Falcon and the Winter Soldier "briefly" and without impact. It said that Brave New World's "steadfast refusal to engage with its own ideas, either by artistic design or corporate mandate, reeks of timidity". Writing for RogerEbert.com, Robert Daniels said Wilson was turned into the Magical Negro for the film, and that "in an effort to soothe white America's anger and hurt", the film "also asks its hero to grin and figuratively tap dance off screen".

Collider's Aidan Kelley said the dialogue was among the worst present in the whole of the MCU, and criticized the boringness of Wilson, Sidewinder, and Bat-Seraph, though it praised Ford's empathy. They pointed out the non-cohesive nature of the film, mentioning the reshoots the film underwent as resulting in this. In agreement on the topic of Ford, Lee said Ford was the main attraction, lauding his gravitas and "twinkle in his eye and a merry warmth". White called the character development "an afterthought", feeling Mackie had "little to play with" emotionally, and criticized his relegation to "a functional, blandly heroic punching machine" despite his acting talent. The Wall Street Journal's Kyle Smith said that the film is "competently executed, without resorting to played-out gimmickry such as skipping across the multiverse", adding that it "gives the audience plenty of analogues for real-world problems". He also wrote that the MCU "draws on The Manchurian Candidate to produce one of its better recent movies", while Katie Walsh of the Los Angeles Times described the film as "a decent political thriller with something culturally resonant to say that exceeds mere comic-book particulars".

Critics were polarized on the visuals. For the New York Post, Johnny Oleksinski felt that the animation of the White House fight scene was "so cheap and cheesy" that it was unable to be taken seriously, and the reveal of the mutated Sterns caused a "hearty guffaw" because of the poor makeup and prosthetics. Kelley wrote that the CGI in the film was worse than The Incredible Hulk (2008), released nearly two decades earlier, and concluded it was unconvincing. Ebiri wrote that the "VFX-heavy sequences are so lifeless and tiresome that I felt my eyes drifting closed a couple of times". Daniels and Freeman both praised the VFX on Red Hulk, though Freeman felt the cherry blossoms were "a green screen mess". Yu wrote that the visuals were "garish" and "slapdash", while Bibbiani called the visuals "drab" and unfinished, criticizing Wilson's CGI wings as a "proof of concept that proves nothing"; they wrote that the film looked "so clean it looks completely fake". Scheck wrote the CGI was "underwhelming" and at other times even worse, but were amused from recognizing Ford's features in Red Hulk. Richard Roeper of the Chicago Sun-Times gave the film three of four stars and called it a "far better work than recent [MCU] missteps".

=== Accolades ===
Accolades received by Captain America: Brave New World
Award	Date of ceremony	Category	Recipient	Result	Ref.
Annie Awards	February 21, 2026	Outstanding Achievement for Character Animation in a Live Action Production	Sidney Kombo-Kintombo, Andrew William Park, Marco Röth, Paul Seyb, and Thien Ly	Nominated	
Black Reel Awards	February 16, 2026	Outstanding Production Design	Ramsey Avery and Rosemary Brandenburg	Nominated	
Critics' Choice Super Awards	August 7, 2025	Best Superhero Movie	Captain America: Brave New World	Nominated	
Critics' Choice Super Awards	August 7, 2025	Best Actor in a Superhero Movie	Anthony Mackie	Nominated	
Hollywood Music in Media Awards	November 19, 2025	Original Score – Sci-Fi/Fantasy Film	Laura Karpman	Nominated	
Nickelodeon Kids' Choice Awards	June 21, 2025	Favorite Movie	Captain America: Brave New World	Nominated	
Nickelodeon Kids' Choice Awards	June 21, 2025	Favorite Villain	Harrison Ford	Nominated	
Nickelodeon Kids' Choice Awards	June 21, 2025	Favorite Butt-Kicker	Anthony Mackie	Nominated	
Saturn Awards	March 8, 2026	Best Cinematic Adaptation	Captain America: Brave New World	Nominated	

Laura Karpman was shortlisted for the Academy Award for Best Original Score at the 98th Academy Awards.

== Future ==
In January 2025, Mackie said he wanted to continue portraying Wilson for around 10 years. He was hopeful about making another Captain America film after his roles in the next two Avengers films, Avengers: Doomsday (2026) and Avengers: Secret Wars (2027).
