= The Longest Week =

- Theatrical release poster
- Directed by: Peter Glanz
- Screenplay by: Peter Glanz
- Story by: Peter Glanz; Juan Iglesias
- Produced by: Uday Chopra; Neda Armian
- Starring: Jason Bateman; Olivia Wilde; Billy Crudup; Jenny Slate
- Narrated by: Larry Pine
- Cinematography: Ben Kutchins
- Edited by: Sarah Flack
- Music by: Jay Israelson
- Production company: YRF Entertainment
- Distributed by: Gravitas Ventures
- Release date: September 5, 2014
- Running time: 86 minutes
- Country: United States
- Language: English
- Budget: $2.5 million
- Box office: $49,490

The Longest Week is a 2014 American romantic comedy-drama film written and directed by Peter Glanz. The film stars Jason Bateman, Olivia Wilde and Billy Crudup in the lead roles. It was produced by Uday Chopra, along with Neda Armian. It is the first project of Yash Raj Film's subsidiary Hollywood production house YRF Entertainment. The film received generally negative reviews from critics.

The film also marks the final film role of Tony Roberts, before his death in 2025.

== Synopsis ==
Affluent and aimless, Conrad Valmont lives a life of leisure in his parents’ prestigious Manhattan hotel. In the span of one week, he finds himself evicted, disinherited, and in love.

== Cast ==
- Jason Bateman as Conrad Valmont
- Olivia Wilde as Beatrice Fairbanks
  - Nicole Berger as Young Beatrice
- Billy Crudup as Dylan Tate
- Jenny Slate as Jocelyn
- Tony Roberts as Barry the Therapist
- Larry Pine as the Narrator

== Production ==
"Glanz adapted The Longest Week from his own Cannes and Sundance short A Relationship In Four Days" - Deadline Hollywood

"...borrows a page from the Woody Allen playbook: the Manhattan setting, the jazz playing in the background, the relationship foibles of wealthy New Yorkers. Glanz even cast Allen stalwart Tony Roberts..." - The Plain Dealer

== Reception ==
Review aggregator website Rotten Tomatoes reports that 10% of 20 critics have given the film a positive review, with an average rating of 3.8/10. According to Metacritic, which assigned the film a weighted average score of 34 out of 100 based on nine critics, the film received "generally unfavorable reviews".

Film critic Peter Sobczynski gave the film a negative review, stating "unless your hunger for watching dimly conceived comedy dramas focusing on obnoxious and over-privileged jerks Coming to Terms with Things was not sated with the recent Last Weekend, most viewers will spend most of the running time wishing that they had simply stayed home and watched that Saved by the Bell docudrama that you DVR'd but haven't quite summoned up the courage to watch as of yet".
