= Red Hulk =

Marvel Comics antihero

The Red Hulk is an alias that is used by several fictional characters appearing in American comic books published by Marvel Comics; examples include Thunderbolt Ross and Robert Maverick, as well as other equivalents in specific Marvel timelines. The character has appeared in numerous adaptions in media alongside the comics including several animated television shows, video games and in the Marvel Cinematic Universe film Captain America: Brave New World (2025).

== Fictional character biography ==
=== Thunderbolt Ross ===
The first Red Hulk (also known as Rulk) appeared in the Hulk series that debuted in 2008. The 2010 World War Hulks storyline reveals Red Hulk to be Thunderbolt Ross, a longtime adversary of the Hulk. The storyline reveals that Ross was given the ability to transform into the Red Hulk by the criminal organizations A.I.M. and Intelligencia, which he agrees to in order to better fight the original Hulk.

=== Robert Maverick ===
The second Red Hulk appears in the 2017 debut issue of U.S.Avengers. Four-star general Robert Maverick is selected for his genetic profile to create a being who is "halfway to a Hulk". A device called the Hulk Plug-In, created by Avengers Idea Mechanics, was implanted in Maverick's wrist, giving him the ability to transform into Red Hulk for one hour approximately every day and a half. Maverick goes on to join the U.S. Avengers.

=== Joe Fixit ===
The Hulk's Joe Fixit personality gained the ability to transform into the Red Hulk while in the Below-Place.

== Powers and abilities ==
The Red Hulk has superhuman strength, durability, and endurance, comparable to that of the Hulk. He is capable of absorbing radiation, which his body can metabolize for increased strength. Unlike the Hulk, increased anger does not make him stronger but causes him to emit increasing heat. The upper limit of this heat has not been specified. When fighting the Hulk, during the Red Hulk's first story line, this heat created an aura of light around the two behemoths and melted the desert sand on which they stood into a glass disc at least dozens of feet in diameter. At this level, the Red Hulk weakens and is vulnerable to being knocked unconscious by the Hulk.

== Collected editions ==
Title	Material collected	Published date	ISBN
Hulk: Fall of the Hulks: Red Hulk	Fall of the Hulks: Red Hulk #1-4 and material from Incredible Hulk #606-608	August 2010	978-0785147954
Red Hulk: Scorched Earth	Hulk (vol. 2) #25-30	May 2011	978-0785148968
Red Hulk: Planet Red Hulk	Hulk (vol. 2) #30.1, 31–36	October 2011	978-0785155782
Fear Itself: Hulk/Dracula	Hulk (vol. 2) #37-41, Fear Itself: Hulk vs Dracula #1-3	November 2011	978-0785155805
Red Hulk: Hulk of Arabia	Hulk (vol. 2) #42-46	April 2012	978-0785160953
Red Hulk: Haunted	Hulk (vol. 2) #47-52	August 2012	978-0785160991
Red Hulk: Mayan Rule	Hulk (vol. 2) #53-57	October 2012	978-0785160977

== Other versions ==
=== Marvel 2099 ===
In the unified Marvel 2099 reality of Earth-2099, space explorer Ross Romero is dispatched with his crew by Alchemax to explore a rogue planet that appeared around the Sun. After the planet attacks his crew, Romero is left stranded. Romero later finds a red fruit that transforms him into Red Hulk; he figures out that the planet he is stranded on is Ego the Living Planet, who chose to empower him.

=== Secret Wars (2015) ===
The 2015 "Secret Wars" story line features the Battleworld domain of Greenland and contains several Red Hulks who are part of the Tribal Hulks. One Red Hulk rules Greenland as the Red King until he is killed by the Captain.

== In other media ==
=== Television ===
- Thunderbolt Ross / Red Hulk appears in The Avengers: Earth's Mightiest Heroes, voiced by Fred Tatasciore.
- Thunderbolt Ross / Red Hulk appears in Hulk and the Agents of S.M.A.S.H., voiced by Clancy Brown.
- Thunderbolt Ross / Red Hulk appears in the Ultimate Spider-Man four-part episode "Contest of Champions", voiced again by Clancy Brown.
- Thunderbolt Ross / Red Hulk appears in Avengers Assemble, voiced again by Clancy Brown.

=== Marvel Cinematic Universe ===
Thaddeus Ross / Red Hulk appears in the Marvel Cinematic Universe (MCU) film Captain America: Brave New World (2025), portrayed by Harrison Ford. Previously, the character was considered to appear in the preceding films Captain America: Civil War (2016) and Avengers: Endgame (2019), and a film featuring both the Hulk and Red Hulk was considered. The film never entered development due to conflicts with Universal Pictures, who hold the film rights to the Hulk and all related characters.

=== Video games ===
- Thunderbolt Ross / Red Hulk appears as a playable character in the GameStop-exclusive Xbox 360 version of The Incredible Hulk (2008).
- The Red Hulk appears as an alternate costume for the Hulk in Marvel: Ultimate Alliance 2, Marvel Super Hero Squad, Marvel vs. Capcom 3: Fate of Two Worlds, Ultimate Marvel vs. Capcom 3, Marvel Super Hero Squad: The Infinity Gauntlet, Marvel vs. Capcom: Infinite, and Marvel Tokon: Fighting Souls.
- Thunderbolt Ross / Red Hulk appears as a playable character in Marvel Super Hero Squad Online, voiced by Tom Kenny.
- Thunderbolt Ross / Red Hulk appears as an unlockable character in Marvel Avengers Alliance.
- Thunderbolt Ross / Red Hulk appears as a playable character in Lego Marvel Super Heroes, voices again by Fred Tatasciore.
- Thunderbolt Ross / Red Hulk appears as a playable character in Marvel Contest of Champions.
- Thunderbolt Ross / Red Hulk appears as a playable character in Marvel: Future Fight, with Robert Maverick / Red Hulk as an alternate costume.
- Thunderbolt Ross / Red Hulk appears as a playable character in Lego Marvel's Avengers.
- Thunderbolt Ross / Red Hulk appears as a playable character in Marvel Avengers Academy, voiced again by Fred Tatasciore.
- Thunderbolt Ross / Red Hulk appears as a playable character in Marvel Puzzle Quest.
- Thunderbolt Ross / Red Hulk appears as a playable character in Lego Marvel Super Heroes 2.
