= Peter Glanz (filmmaker) =

British-American writer/director

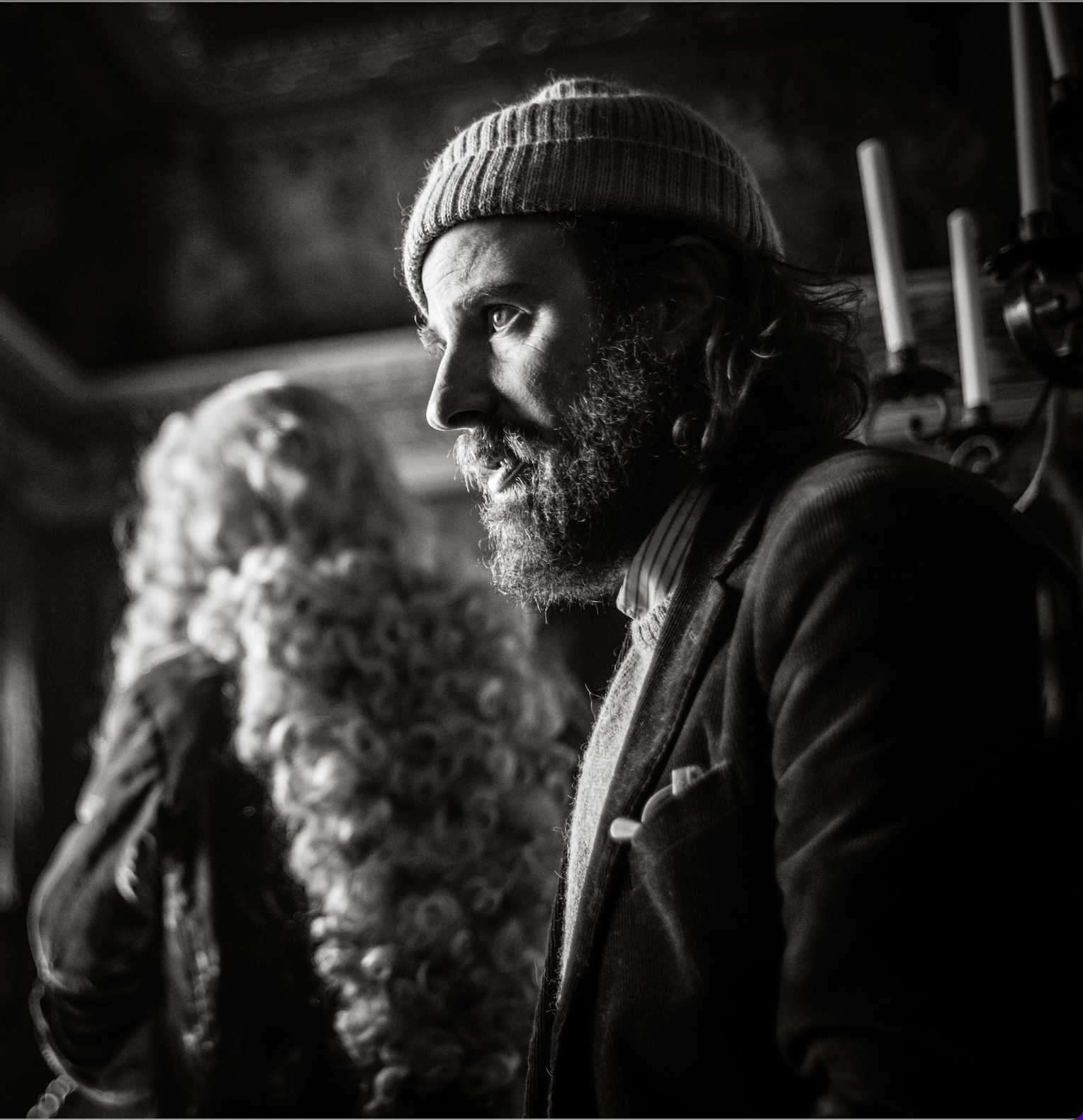
- Glanz on the set of Savage House
- Born: January 28, 1983 (age 43); Hartford, Connecticut, United States
- Education: Art Center of Design
- Occupation: Filmmaker
- Years active: 2008–present

Peter Glanz is a British-American writer and director based in Los Angeles best known for writing Captain America: Brave New World (2025), as well as writing and directing The Longest Week (2014) and Savage House (2026).

== Early life ==
Glanz graduated high school from New World School of the Arts in Miami and earned a B.A. in film from Art Center College of Design in Pasadena on a full Presidential Scholarship.

== Career ==
=== Film ===
==== The Longest Week, 2014 ====
Glanz's feature-length film debut as a writer and director, The Longest Week follows Conrad, an heir to a hotel fortune played by Jason Bateman, who is financially cut off after his parents' divorce. Conrad seeks help from an old friend Dylan, played by Billy Crudup, and immediately falls for Dylan's girlfriend (Olivia Wilde). The Longest Week is an adaptation of Glanz's short film, A Relationship in Four Days, which was screened at the Sundance Film Festival and Cannes Critics' Week in 2008.

==== Captain America: Brave New World, 2025 ====
Glanz co-wrote the screenplay for Captain America: Brave New World starring Anthony Mackie as Sam Wilson / Captain America alongside Harrison Ford. The film is an American superhero film based on Marvel Comics featuring the character Sam Wilson / Captain America. Produced by Marvel Studios and distributed by Walt Disney Studios Motion Pictures, it is the fourth installment in the Captain America film series, a continuation of the television miniseries The Falcon and the Winter Soldier (2021), and the 35th film in the Marvel Cinematic Universe (MCU). The film is directed by Julius Onah from a screenplay by Rob Edwards and the writing teams of Glanz and Onah, Malcolm Spellman and Dalan Musson. The film received mixed reviews; however, it was praised for reflecting an American desire for Black people to effect change and lead the charge.

==== Savage House, 2026 ====
Glanz wrote and directed Savage House, a black comedy set in the 18th century in England amidst a pox outbreak about a family of social climbers who scramble to impress a higher ranking nobleman. Starring Richard E. Grant and Claire Foy as Sir Chauncey and Lady Savage, the film offers satirical commentary on growing class divides and power inequalities. The cinematography, costumes and set designs capture both the decadence and the gruesome health conditions of the era.

==== Additional projects ====
Glanz sold the drama, Race to the South Pole, to Pearl Street Productions in 2012 with Casey Affleck attached as the lead. In 2016, he adapted pianist Byron Janis' memoir Chopin and Beyond, with Martin Scorsese attached to direct. In 2023, Glanz adapted the screenplay of Nemesis, Philip Roth’s final novel, which deals with such timely themes as antisemitism and an epidemic. Glanz co-wrote the biopic Samo Lives, which is in production, about the life and enduring impact of famed graffiti and urban artist, Jean-Michel Basquiat. Kelvin Harrison is starring as Basquiat and Julius Onah co-wrote and is directing the project. Samo Lives will be the first version of the Haitian-born artist's story directed and co-authored by a Black filmmaker.

=== Television ===
==== The Trivial Pursuits of Arthur Banks, 2011 ====
Glanz created the three-episode series, The Trivial Pursuits of Arthur Banks, which follows a successful playwright as he stages his latest play based on his dysfunctional life. The Webby-nominated series stars Adam Goldberg, Jeffrey Tambor, and Laura Clery. The series marked the first production for AMC's Digital Studios, which co-released the program through Hulu.

=== Music videos and commercials ===
In 2015, Glanz directed the music video for Carly Rae Jepsen's song, "I Really Like You", starring Tom Hanks and Justin Bieber. As a commercial director, Glanz is represented by MERMAN and has directed commercials for brands including Chanel, Carolina Herrera, DKNY, Tommy Hilfiger, Lexus, and RAM.

== Credits ==
=== Film ===
- The Longest Week (2014) (writer and director)
- Captain America: Brave New World (2025) (writer)
- Savage House (2026) (writer and director)
- Samo Lives (TBA) (writer)

=== Television ===
- The Trivial Pursuits of Arthur Banks (2011) (writer and director)
