= List of What If issues =

The Marvel Comics anthology series What If? tells alternate reality stories outside the mainstream Marvel Universe continuity, which the company sets on what it calls Earth-616. A number of these stories have been set on alternate Earths in the Marvel Comics Multiverse (i.e., multiple universes) for which Marvel has given official numerical designations.

== Volume 1 (1977–1984) ==
1. What if Spider-Man had joined the Fantastic Four? (based on The Amazing Spider-Man #1)
  - Reprinted in The Best of What If? Followed by What If? #21. Alternate sequels appeared in What If? vol. 2, #35, and Paradise X. This world was designated Earth-772 in Marvel Encyclopedia: Fantastic Four.
  - Spider-Man did eventually join the team as a member of the "New Fantastic Four" and the Future Foundation.
2. What if the Hulk had the brain of Bruce Banner? (based on The Incredible Hulk #1)
  - This world was designated Earth-774 in Marvel Encyclopedia: Fantastic Four.
3. What if the Avengers had never been? (based on The Avengers #3)
4. What if the Invaders stayed together after World War II? (considered part of Earth-616, the mainstream Marvel continuity)
5. What if Captain America had not vanished during World War II? (based on Avengers #4)
6. What if the Fantastic Four had different super-powers? (based on The Fantastic Four #1)
  - This version of the team reappeared in What If? (vol. 2) #39. This world was designated Earth-7712 in Marvel Encyclopedia: Fantastic Four.
7. What if someone else besides Spider-Man had been bitten by the radioactive spider? (based on Amazing Fantasy #15)
  - Three different stories look at what would have happened if either Peter's class bully Flash Thompson, his would-have-been temporary girlfriend Betty Brant, or publisher J. Jonah Jameson's astronaut son John, had been bitten by the radioactive spider instead. With the exception of Betty Brant (who quits her moniker like Peter did in "Spider-Man No More!"), the protagonist dies in each story. A darker version of the Flash story is redone as What If? (vol. 2) #76.
8. What if the world knew Daredevil was blind? (based on Daredevil #2)
  - This issue also contained the first humor-based What If? in the series asking, "What if the spider had been bitten by a radioactive human?".
9. What if the Avengers fought evil in the 1950s?
  - Designated Earth-9904 in All-New Official Handbook of the Marvel Universe: A-Z Update #2 (2007). A version of this timeline was revisited in Avengers Forever, and yet another version made a cameo in Paradise X.
  - The Agents of Atlas, a superhero team from the 1950s, was based on this concept.
10. What if Jane Foster had found the hammer of Thor? (based on Journey into Mystery #83)
  - The main universe's Jane Foster would eventually become the new Thor in Thor (vol. 4) #1.
11. What if the original Marvel Bullpen had become the Fantastic Four? (based on The Fantastic Four #1)
  - This world made a brief tongue-in-cheek appearance in Paradise X. It was designated Earth-1228 in The Official Handbook of the Marvel Universe: Alternate Universes 2005.
12. What if Rick Jones had become the Hulk? (based on The Incredible Hulk #1)
13. What if Conan the Barbarian walked the Earth today? (based on The Savage Sword of Conan #7 "The Citadel at the Center of Time")
  - An alternate ending to this story can be seen in What If? #43.
14. What if Nick Fury had fought World War II in outer space?
  - This universe made a brief appearance in Paradise X.
15. What if Nova had been four other people? (based on Nova #1)
  - Instead of the random decision for Richard Rider to become Nova, the powers of Nova are transferred to a vengeful wife whose husband had been murdered, a kind and homeless black man in a universe with no superheroes, Peter Parker in a world where the radioactive spider that bit him had crippled him, and an unknown character with a villainous personality.
16. What if Shang-Chi, Master of Kung Fu, fought on the side of Fu Manchu? (based on Master of Kung Fu #15)
17. What if the Ghost Rider, Spider-Woman and Captain Marvel were villains? (based on Marvel Spotlight #5 and #32 and Marvel Super Heroes #12)
  - As with issue #7, this contained three short stories with the theme of Marvel characters who strayed close to becoming villains rather than heroes in the Earth-616 universe.
18. What if Doctor Strange were a disciple of Dormammu? (based on Strange Tales #110)
19. What if Spider-Man had never become a crimefighter? (based on Amazing Fantasy #15)
20. What if the Avengers fought the Kree-Skrull War without Rick Jones? (based on Avengers #96)
21. What if the Invisible Girl of the Fantastic Four had married the Sub-Mariner?
  - A sequel to What If? #1.
22. What if Doctor Doom had become a hero? (based on Fantastic Four #5)
  - This world was designated Earth-808 in Marvel Encyclopedia: Fantastic Four.
23. What if the Hulk had become a barbarian? (based on The Incredible Hulk #205)
  - This issue also contains the back-up humor story, "What if Aunt May had been bitten by the radioactive spider?"
24. What if Gwen Stacy had lived? (based on The Amazing Spider-Man #121)
  - Reprinted in The Best of What If?
25. What if Thor and the Avengers fought the gods? (based on Thor #136)
  - Also features the backup story "The First Uni-Mind", explaining the origins and concept of the Uni-Mind and the origin story of A'lars and Zuras.
26. What if Captain America had been elected president? (based on Captain America #250)
  - This issue also contained the back-up story, "What if the Man-Thing had regained Ted Sallis' brain?" (based on Man-Thing (vol. 2) #1)
27. What if Jean Grey had not died? (based on X-Men #137)
  - Reprinted in The Best of What If? Redone in What If? (vol. 2) #32-33.
28. What if Daredevil became an agent of S.H.I.E.L.D.? (based on Daredevil #1)
  - Reprinted in The Best of What If?
  - This also contained the back-up story, "What if the Ghost Rider had been separated from Johnny Blaze?"
29. What if the Avengers defeated everybody? (based on Avengers Special #2)
  - This world was designated Earth-8110 in The Official Handbook of the Marvel Universe: Alternate Universes 2005.
  - This also contained the backup story, "What if Namor had never regained his memories?"
30. What if Spider-Man's clone had lived? (based on The Amazing Spider-Man #149)
  - It was revealed years later that the clone had indeed lived, but had just been in hiding. He was reintroduced under the name Ben Reilly.
31. What if Wolverine had killed the Hulk? (based on The Incredible Hulk #181)
  - The concept was reversed in What If? (vol. 2) #50 (although it followed a later rematch between the characters). This issue also includes "What if the Fantastic Four had never been?" (based on The Fantastic Four #1). The latter world was designated Earth-8222 in Marvel Encyclopedia: Fantastic Four.
32. What if the Avengers had become pawns of Korvac? (based on Avengers #177)
  - Reprinted in The Best of What If? Extended in #43. A version of this world was visited by Quasar in Quasar #30.
33. What if the Dazzler had become the herald of Galactus? (based on Dazzler #11) / What if Iron Man was trapped in the time of King Arthur? (based on Iron Man #150)
34. What If Humor Issue
  - Parts reprinted in The Best of What If?
35. What if Elektra had lived? (based on Daredevil #182)
  - This issue also includes "What if Hank Pym had died?" (based on Avengers #212)
36. What if the Fantastic Four had not gained their super-powers? (based on The Fantastic Four #1)
  - Reprinted in The Best of What If? This version of the team reappeared in What If? (vol. 2) #39. This world was designated Earth-8212 in Marvel Encyclopedia: Fantastic Four. This issue also includes "What if Richard Rider had not lost the power of Nova?" (based on Nova #25)
37. What if the Thing and the Beast continued to mutate? (based on Marvel Two-in-One #81 and Amazing Adventures #11)
  - The world featuring the Thing was designated Earth-8321 in Marvel Encyclopedia: Fantastic Four. This issue also includes "What if the Silver Surfer had lost the Power Cosmic?" (based on Fantastic Four #50)
38. What if... featuring Daredevil (set in a possible future) and Captain America (based on Captain America #237)
  - Three alternate futures, including a Vision and Scarlet Witch tale. Only one diverges from a specific point: the Captain America story "What if Sharon Carter had not died?"
39. What if Thor battled Conan the Barbarian?
40. What if Doctor Strange had not become Master of the Mystic Arts? (based on Strange Tales #110)
  - This timeline made a cameo appearance in Paradise X.
41. What if the Sub-Mariner had saved Atlantis from its destiny? (based on Sub-Mariner #1)
42. What if the Invisible Girl had died in childbirth? (based on Fantastic Four Annual #6)
  - This world was designated Earth-8312 in Marvel Encyclopedia: Fantastic Four.
43. What if Conan the Barbarian was stranded in the 20th century?
  - An alternate ending to What If? #13. Also includes an extended ending to What If? #32.
44. What if Captain America were revived today? (1983) (based on Avengers #4)
  - Redone in What If? (vol. 2) #67-68 and 103.
45. What if the Hulk went berserk? (based on The Incredible Hulk #1)
46. What if Spider-Man's Uncle Ben had lived (and Aunt May was murdered instead)? (based on Amazing Fantasy #15)
  - Redone in What If Spider-Man (2005)
47. What if Loki had found the hammer of Thor? (based on Journey into Mystery #83)
  - Final issue of the original series.

Select stories (noted above) were collected in a trade paperback, The Best of What If, in 1991. The entire series was collected in a series of seven volumes titled What If Classic from 2004 to 2010, with the exception of issues #13 and 16 and the lead story of #43 because they featured licensed characters, namely Conan the Barbarian and Fu Manchu.

== Special (1988) ==
- What if Iron Man had been a traitor? (based on Tales of Suspense #39)

== Volume 2 (1989–1998) ==
1. What if the Avengers had lost the Evolutionary War? (based on Avengers Annual #17)
  - Visited by Quasar in Quasar #30.
2. What if Daredevil had killed the Kingpin? (based on Daredevil #228)
3. What if Steve Rogers had refused to give up being Captain America? (based on Captain America #332)
4. What if the Venom alien costume had possessed Spider-Man? (based on The Amazing Spider-Man #258)
  - Visited by Quasar in Quasar #30.
5. What if the Vision had destroyed the Avengers? (based on Avengers #9)
6. What if the X-Men lost Inferno? (based on The New Mutants #73)
7. What if Wolverine was an agent of S.H.I.E.L.D.? (based on The Incredible Hulk #181)
8. What if Iron Man lost the Armor Wars? (based on Iron Man #225)
9. What if the X-Men died on their first mission? (based on Giant-Size X-Men #1)
  - This world was designated Earth-105709 in Quasar #30.
10. What if the Punisher's family had not been killed?
11. What if the Fantastic Four all had the same power? (based on Fantastic Four #1)
  - The four worlds shown here were designated Earths 9031 through 9034 in Marvel Encyclopedia: Fantastic Four.
12. What if the X-Men had stayed in Asgard? (based on The New Mutants Special Edition #1)
13. What if Professor X of the X-Men had become the Juggernaut? (based on Uncanny X-Men #12)
14. What if Captain Marvel had not died? (based on The Death of Captain Marvel)
  - Visited by Quasar in Quasar #30.
15. What if the Fantastic Four had lost the trial of Galactus? (based on Fantastic Four #262)
  - This world was designated Earth-907 in Marvel Encyclopedia: Fantastic Four.
16. What if Wolverine battled Conan the Barbarian? (based on Uncanny X-Men #137)
17. What if Kraven the Hunter had killed Spider-Man? (based on Web of Spider-Man #31-32)
18. What if the Fantastic Four battled Doctor Doom before they got their powers?
  - This world was designated Earth-9011 in Marvel Encyclopedia: Fantastic Four.
19. What if the Vision of the Avengers conquered the world? (based on Avengers #254)
  - Two takes, one of which (a utopian world) was revisited in What If? (vol. 2) #36. The utopian world was designated Earth-90110 and the dystopian world Earth-90111 in The Official Handbook of the Marvel Universe: Alternate Universes 2005.
20. What if Spider-Man had not married Mary Jane Watson? (Part 1 of 2) (based on Amazing Spider-Man #292)
21. What if Spider-Man had married the Black Cat? (Part 2 of 2) (based on Amazing Spider-Man #292)
  - The first of several two-parters throughout the second series.
22. What if the Silver Surfer had not escaped Earth? (based on Silver Surfer (vol. 2) #1)
  - This world was designated Earth-912 in Marvel Encyclopedia: Fantastic Four.
23. What if the all-new, all-different X-Men had never existed? (based on Giant-Size X-Men #1)
24. What if Wolverine was Lord of the Vampires? (based on Uncanny X-Men #159)
  - Visited by Quasar in Quasar #30. This world was designated Earth-9140 in The Official Handbook of the Marvel Universe: Alternate Universes 2005. An alternate version features in What If? (vol. 2) #37.
25. What if the Marvel Super Heroes had lost Atlantis Attacks? (based on Iron Man Annual #10)
  - Visited by Quasar in Quasar #30.
26. What if the Punisher had killed Daredevil? (based on Daredevil #183)
  - The issue uses the original planned continuity order for Frank Miller's Daredevil run, as Daredevil #183-184 were originally planned to run in Daredevil #168-169, but held back for a year and a half due to issues with the story's plot involving drugs.
27. What if Namor had joined the Fantastic Four? (based on Fantastic Four #4)
  - This world was designated Earth-917 in Marvel Encyclopedia: Fantastic Four.
28. What if Captain America had led an army of supersoldiers in World War II? (Part 1 of 2) (based on Captain America Comics #1)
29. What if Captain America had formed the Avengers? (Part 2 of 2) (based on Captain America Comics #1 and Avengers #4)
  - Recycles themes from What If? #44. Redone as What If? (vol. 2) #103.
30. What if the Fantastic Four's second child had lived? (based on Fantastic Four #267)
  - Two takes; the worse world was designated Earth-91111 and the better world Earth-91112 in Marvel Encyclopedia: Fantastic Four.
  - This plot idea was subsequently picked up for the mainstream continuity with the introduction of Valeria Richards.
31. What if Spider-Man had kept his cosmic powers? (based on Amazing Spider-Man #329)
32. What if Jean Grey had not died? (Part 1 of 2) (based on Uncanny X-Men #137)
33. What if Phoenix rose again? (Part 2 of 2) (based on Uncanny X-Men #137)
  - A two-part remake of What If? #27.
  - Part One (#32) uses Chris Claremont's notes for the original plan for Uncanny X-Men #138-150 for its story.
34. What if no one was watching the Watcher? (humor issue)
35. What if the Fantastic Five fought Doctor Doom and Annihilus? (Timequake Part 1 of 5)
  - An alternate outcome of What If? #1.
36. What if the Cosmic Avengers battled the Guardians of the Galaxy? (Timequake Part 2 of 5)
  - A sequel to What If? (vol. 2) #19's "Utopia" story.
37. What if Wolverine had been Lord of the Vampires during Inferno? (Timequake Part 3 of 5)
  - An alternate version of What If? (vol. 2) #24. This world was designated Earth-9250 in The Official Handbook of the Marvel Universe: Alternate Universes 2005.
38. What if Thor was a thrall of Seth? (Timequake Part 4 of 5) (based on The Mighty Thor #400)
  - This world was designated Earth-9260 in The Official Handbook of the Marvel Universe: Alternate Universes 2005.
39. What if the Watcher saved the universe? (Timequake Part 5 of 5)
  - The events of Timequake were reflected later in Avengers Forever.
40. What if Storm of the X-Men had remained a thief? (based on Uncanny X-Men #117)
  - Reprinted in X-Men: Alterniverse Visions.
41. What if the Avengers had fought Galactus? (based on Fantastic Four #1 and Fantastic Four #48-50)
  - This world was designated Earth-929 in Marvel Encyclopedia: Fantastic Four.
42. What if Spider-Man had kept his six arms? (based on The Amazing Spider-Man #100)
43. What if Wolverine had married Mariko Yashida? (based on Uncanny X-Men #173)
44. What if Venom had possessed the Punisher? (based on Web of Spider-Man #1)
45. What if Barbara Ketch had become the Ghost Rider? (based on Ghost Rider (vol. 3) #1)
  - This world was designated Earth-11993 in The Official Handbook of the Marvel Universe: Alternate Universes 2005.
46. What if Cable had destroyed the X-Men? (Part 1 of 2) (based on Uncanny X-Men #269)
47. What if Magneto took over the U.S.A.? (Part 2 of 2) (based on Uncanny X-Men #269)
  - This world was designated Earth-21993 in The Official Handbook of the Marvel Universe: Alternate Universes 2005.
48. What if Daredevil had saved Nuke? (based on Daredevil #233)
49. What if the Silver Surfer possessed the Infinity Gauntlet? (based on Infinity Gauntlet #4)
  - Another take appears in What If? vol. 2 #104.
50. What if the Hulk had killed Wolverine? (based on The Incredible Hulk #340)
  - A reversed sort-of remake of What If? #31.
51. What if the Punisher became Captain America? (based on Captain America #212)
52. What if Doctor Doom became Sorcerer Supreme? (based on Fantastic Four #5)
  - This world was designated Earth-938 in Marvel Encyclopedia: Fantastic Four.
53. What if ...the Iron Man of 2020 had been stranded in the past? / ...Rick Jones and Bruce Banner had both remained as the Hulk? / ...Spider-Man had killed the Lizard?
  - Featuring Iron Man (based on The Amazing Spider-Man Annual #20), the Hulk (based on The Incredible Hulk #332), and Spider-Man (based on Spider-Man #5).
54. What if Death's Head had lived? (Based on Death's Head #1)
  - The only Marvel UK-themed issue. Written and pencilled by Death's Head co-creators Simon Furman and Geoff Senior, Furman later claimed that this issue's high body count was a sort-of revenge for killing the character.
55. What if the Avengers lost Operation: Galactic Storm? (Part 1 of 2) (based on Avengers #346)
56. What if the Avengers lost Operation: Galactic Storm? (Part 2 of 2) (based on Avengers #346)
57. What if the Punisher became an agent of S.H.I.E.L.D.?
58. What if the Punisher had killed Spider-Man? (based on The Amazing Spider-Man #129)
59. What if Wolverine led Alpha Flight? (based on Uncanny X-Men #121)
  - Reprinted in X-Men: Alterniverse Visions.
60. A What If? X-Men Wedding Album
  - Three different stories all related to the Cyclops-Jean Grey relationship, looking at what would have happened had Scott married Jean in the early days of the X-Men, if the pair had never gotten together, or if Jean had married Wolverine instead. (based on Amazing Adventures #11, Uncanny X-Men #1 and Uncanny X-Men #101)
61. What if Spider-Man's parents destroyed his family? (based on The Amazing Spider-Man #387)
62. What if Wolverine battled Weapon X? (based on Marvel Comics Presents #72)
  - Reprinted in X-Men: Alterniverse Visions.
63. What if War Machine had not destroyed the Living Laser? (based on Iron Man #289)
  - The issue allows the reader to choose from three different endings.
64. What if Iron Man sold out? (based on Tales of Suspense #39)
65. What if Warren Worthington III fell from grace? (based on X-Factor #25)
66. What if Rogue possessed the power of Thor? (based on Avengers Annual #10)
  - Reprinted in X-Men: Alterniverse Visions.
67. What if Captain America was revived in 1994? (Part 1 of 2) (based on Avengers #4)
68. What if Captain America was revived in 1994? (Part 2 of 2) (based on Avengers #4)
  - A remake of What If? #44.
69. What if Stryfe had killed the X-Men? (based on X-Force #18)
  - Reprinted in X-Men: Alterniverse Visions.
70. What if the Silver Surfer had not betrayed Galactus? (based on Fantastic Four #50)
  - This world was designated Earth-952 in Marvel Encyclopedia: Fantastic Four.
71. What if the gamma bomb had spawned a thousand Hulks?
72. What if Spider-Man was a murderer? (based on Amazing Fantasy #15)
73. What if the Kingpin owned Daredevil? (based on Daredevil #1)
74. What if Mister Sinister had formed the X-Men? (based on Uncanny X-Men #1)
75. What if Blink from Generation X had not died? (based on X-Men #37)
76. What if Peter Parker had to destroy Spider-Man? (based on Amazing Fantasy #15)
  - The last issue to officially feature Uatu the Watcher as the narrator (although he had been absent from several previous issues). This story is another take on one of the three from What If? #7.
77. What if Legion had killed Magneto? (based on Uncanny X-Men #320)
78. What if the New Fantastic Four had remained a team? (based on Fantastic Four #349)
  - This world was designated Earth-9510 in Marvel Encyclopedia: Fantastic Four.
79. What if Storm had the power of Phoenix Force? (based on Uncanny X-Men #100)
80. What if the Hulk had evolved into the Maestro? (based on The Incredible Hulk #377)
81. What if the Age of Apocalypse had not ended? (based on X-Men: Omega)
82. What if J. Jonah Jameson had adopted Spider-Man? (based on The Amazing Spider-Man #1)
83. What if Daredevil was the disciple of Doctor Strange? (based on Strange Tales #110 and Daredevil #1)
84. What if Shard had lived instead of Bishop? (based on Uncanny X-Men #282)
85. What if Magneto ruled all mutants? (based on Uncanny X-Men #304)
86. What if the Scarlet Spider had killed Spider-Man? (based on Web of Spider-Man #129)
87. What if...starring Sabretooth: Screams in the night! (What if Sabretooth was loose in the X-Mansion?)
  - Starting with this issue, the covers no longer explicitly state what each story's "what if" is, making them more like DC Comics' Elseworlds.
88. What if...starring Spider-Man: Arachnamorphosis (What if Spider-Man evolved into a Spider-Monster?) – based on Amazing Fantasy #15)
89. What if...starring the Fantastic Four: Deadly inheritance (What if the Fantastic Four's powers were out of control?) – based on The Fantastic Four #1)
  - This world was designated Earth-969 in Marvel Encyclopedia: Fantastic Four.
90. What if...starring Cyclops and Havok: Their early years, their darkest fears! (What if Cyclops and Havok were not orphaned?)
91. What if...starring The Incredible Hulk: The man, the monster (What if Bruce Banner was savage and the Hulk intelligent?) – based on The Incredible Hulk #1
92. What if...starring Cannonball's little brother, Josh—and his pet Sentinel! (What if Josh had discovered a Sentinel?)
93. What if...starring Wolverine: A man no more (What if Wolverine became savage?) – based on Wolverine (vol. 2) #100
94. What if...starring Juggernaut: The kingdom of Cain (What if the Juggernaut had killed Xavier and the X-Men?) – based on Uncanny X-Men #12
95. What if...starring Ghost Rider: Burn, baby, burn! (What if the Ghost Rider was different?) – based on Ghost Rider #1
96. What if...starring Quicksilver: The quick and the dead (What if Magneto had raised his children?)
97. What if...starring Black Knight: Camelot reborn (What if Doctor Doom had conquered Camelot?)
98. What if...starring Rogue: Children in the attic (What if Mystique had raised Nightcrawler?)
99. What if...starring Spider-Man: The men behind the mask (What if the Black Cat was a celebrity?)
100. What if...starring Gambit: The greatest secrets of the Marvel Universe revealed!
  - What if Mister Sinister learned the greatest secrets of the Marvel Universe?
  - What if the Fantastic Four had crashed in the Land of Oz after gaining their powers?
  - What if Peter Parker was bitten by a radioactive sheep!?
  - What if Wolverine was a wimp?
  - What If Xavier was in charge of a sales executive company?
  - What if Wolverine and Sabretooth were best friends?
101. What if...starring Warren Worthington III: Death and disobedience (What if Archangel had killed X-Factor and the Horsemen?) – based on X-Factor #25
  - Also includes... What if Gambit was a card hustler?
102. What if...starring Daredevil: The fight of his life...has ended! (What if Matt Murdock had become a boxer like his father?) – based on Daredevil #1
103. What if...starring Captain America: The unknown soldier (What if Captain America had awoken in a dystopian America?) – based on Avengers #4
  - A remake of What If? (vol. 2) #28-29
104. What if...starring the Silver Surfer (What if the Impossible Man possessed the Infinity Gauntlet?) – based on Infinity Gauntlet #4
  - A variation on What If? (vol. 2) #49.
105. What if...starring Spider-Girl (What if Spider-Man and Mary Jane's child had survived?)
  - The first appearance of Spider-Girl. Later spun off into the Marvel Comics 2 line. This world was designated Earth-982 in Marvel Encyclopedia: Fantastic Four.
  - Also includes...What if Bucky Barnes had survived and was Captain America's partner?
  - Was reprinted in Spider-Girl #0 (the Bucky story was replaced with previews of two other MC2 titles).
106. What if...starring Gambit: Revenge! (What if Marrow had killed Gambit?) – based on Uncanny X-Men #350
107. What if...starring The Mighty Thor:...and who shall be king?! (What if Thor had assumed the throne of Asgard?)
108. What if...starring the Avengers (What if Carnage had bonded permanently to the Silver Surfer?) – based on The Amazing Spider-Man #431
109. What if...starring the Fantastic Four: The Thing...human again?! (What if Ben Grimm had stayed in Liddleville?) – based on Fantastic Four #236
  - This world was designated Earth-989 in Marvel Encyclopedia: Fantastic Four.
110. What if...starring The Uncanny X-Men: With Phoenix Force possessed...who will save Professor X...from the fury of Colossus? (What if Colossus had joined the U.S.S.R.'s Soviet Super-Soldiers?) – based on Giant-Size X-Men #1
  - Also includes... What if Doctor Doom had succeeded in conquering the world?
111. What if...starring Wolverine (What if Wolverine was a Horseman of War?) – based on Wolverine #100
112. What if...starring Ka-Zar: New York City...the new Savage Land...no escape! (What if Thanos turned Manhattan into a Savage Land?)
113. What if...starring Iron Man: Alone against Dormammu...Tony Stark--Sorcerer Supreme? (What if Tony Stark had become Sorcerer Supreme?) – based on Strange Tales #110 and Tales of Suspense #39
114. What if...starring Secret Wars: 25 years later...comes a new generation of heroes! (What if all the participants of Secret Wars had been trapped on Battleworld?) – based on Secret Wars #12
  - Final issue. This world was designated Earth-9811 in Marvel Encyclopedia: Fantastic Four.

Issue #-1, What if...starring Bishop (based on Uncanny X-Men #282), was published as a part of the "Flashback" event, in which most of Marvel's series published issues numbered "-1" that were set in the past. This particular issue features an alternate backstory for Bishop, where he and Trevor Fitzroy travel back in time to before the X-Men were formed.

== Marvel Alterniverse ==
The Alterniverse was what Marvel briefly labeled their What If stories from 1995 to 1996. The stories told under the Alterniverse label are typically one-shots and limited series, such as Ruins, Punisher: A Man Named Frank, Punisher Kills the Marvel Universe, and The Last Avengers Story.

== Volume 3 (2005) ==
A series of What If one-shot issues was released cover-dated February 2005.

- What if Karen Page had lived?
- What if Doctor Doom had become the Thing?
- What if Thunderbolt Ross had become the Hulk?
- What if Jessica Jones had joined the Avengers?
- What if Professor X and Magneto formed the X-Men together?
- What if Aunt May had died instead of Uncle Ben?
- Wha—Huh? (humor issue)

The series was later collected into a trade paperback entitled What If...?: Why Not.

== Volume 4 (early 2006) ==
The February 2006 one-shot issues took place in a single fictional universe, dubbed Earth-717, with four of the six stories more like DC's Elseworlds with various heroes in historical periods.

- What if Captain America had lived in the American Civil War?
- What if the Fantastic Four were Russian cosmonauts?
- What if the Sub-Mariner had grown up on land instead of Atlantis?
- What if Daredevil had lived in feudal Japan?
- What if Thor was a Herald of Galactus?
- What if Wolverine was Public Enemy Number One?

The series was later collected into a trade paperback entitled What If...?: Mirror Mirror.

== Volume 5 (late 2006) ==
The November 2006 one-shot issues were based on major storylines or crossovers:

- What If: Avengers Disassembled – What if the Scarlet Witch had not acted alone?
- What If: Spider-Man: The Other – What if Peter Parker had rejected his inner spider?
- What If: Wolverine: Enemy of the State – What if Wolverine was never deprogrammed?
- What If: Age of Apocalypse – What if both Xavier and Magneto were killed by Legion?
- What If: X-Men: Deadly Genesis – What if Vulcan became the leader of the X-Men?

The series was later collected into a trade paperback entitled What If...?: Event Horizon featuring the cover from the Spider-Man one-shot.

== Volume 6 (2007) ==
The sixth series of What If? continued the theme of the previous series of examining possible alternatives for major storylines.

- What If: Planet Hulk
  - What if Caiera had survived the destruction on Sakaar instead of the Hulk?
  - What if the Hulk had landed on the planet the Illuminati had intended for him?
  - What if the Hulk had reverted to Bruce Banner when he crashed on Sakaar?
- What If: Annihilation
  - What if the Annihilation Wave reached Earth?
- What If: X-Men: Rise and Fall of the Shi'ar Empire
  - What if Vulcan absorbed the energies of the M'Kraan Crystal and became Phoenix Force?
- What If: Civil War
  - What if Captain America led all the heroes against the Superhero Registration Act?
  - What if Iron Man lost the Civil War?
- What If: Spider-Man vs. Wolverine
  - What if Spider-Man had remained in 1980s Russia after an accidental death?

The series was also due to feature What If?: The New Fantastic Four, which featured the "original" New Fantastic Four with Spider-Man, Wolverine, Ghost Rider, and Hulk teaming up, as seen in Fantastic Four #347-349 and #374. This story was halted due to the death of artist Mike Wieringo, and was released as a 48-Page Special as a tribute in June 2008. All the issues of this run, aside from the New Fantastic Four one, were later collected into a trade paperback simply entitled What If? Civil War. The version of the "New" Fantastic Four is also erroneous, as the Ghost Rider of that time period had been Danny Ketch, not Johnny Blaze. Wieringo had drawn the wrong Ghost Rider in his initial pages by mistake, which was not noticed until after his death.

== Volume 7 (2008) ==
This series continues the theme of alternatives for three recent Marvel events along with two around a classic event. The New Fantastic Four story was a sequel to the one-shot What If? released previously, seeing Iron Man replace Ghost Rider in an alternate take on the Infinity Gauntlet storyline. However, this series also features a storyline featuring the Runaways that runs through all five comics. This series was released between December 2008 and January 2009.

- What If: House of M – What if the Scarlet Witch had said 'No more powers' instead of 'No more mutants'?
- What If: Fallen Son: The Death of Captain America – What if Iron Man had been killed instead of Captain America?
- What If: The Infinity Gauntlet – What if the New Fantastic Four had battled Thanos?
- What If: Spider-Man: Back in Black – What if Mary Jane had been shot instead of Aunt May?
- What If: Secret Wars – What if Doctor Doom had kept the Beyonder's power?
- What If: Runaways – What if the Runaways had become the Young Avengers? (Runs through all five above issues)

The seventh series was later collected into a trade paperback entitled What If...?: Secret Wars featuring the cover from the Secret Wars one-shot.

== Volume 8 (2009) ==
At Fan Expo Canada '09, it was revealed a new five-part What If series would be released, featuring five one-shot issues, each with two alternatives for the focused event, except for Daredevil vs. Elektra, which had only one story. As a back-up feature in the other four one-shot issues, there is a humorous Say What? short story.

- What If? Spider-Man: House of M
  - What if Emma Frost had not mindwiped Gwen Stacy?
  - What if the Scarlet Witch had let Gwen Stacy and her son cross to the default reality and survive?
- What If? Secret Invasion
  - What if Reed Richards had been killed before revealing the Skrull weakness and the Skrulls won?
  - What if the Skrulls had kept the invasion secret throughout all the campaign?
- What If? World War Hulk
  - What if Tony Stark had not hesitated to use the Red Satellite on the Hulk in the final battle?
  - What if Thor had battled the Hulk instead of the Sentry?
- What If? Daredevil vs. Elektra
  - What if Daredevil had been shot and resurrected by the Hand instead of Elektra?
- What If? Astonishing X-Men
  - What if Ord had resurrected Jean Grey instead of Colossus?
  - What if Ultron became aware of Danger during her battle with the X-Men and planned to make her his bride?

The eighth series was later collected into a trade paperback entitled What If...?: Secret Invasion featuring the cover from the Secret Invasion one-shot.

== Volume 9 (2010) ==
In early September 2010, Marvel announced a series of new What If? issues, including the celebration of the 200th issue of What If?. It features a story regarding the Siege event, and a story by Stan Lee about the Watcher and Galactus. Further What If stories were released for Dark Reign, Spider-Man: Grim Hunt, a story focusing on Wolverine and his son Daken, and another on the pre-hero and villain lives of Iron Man and Doctor Doom. Those four issues also have a back-up story on Deadpool being controlled by the Venom symbiote. The Venom/Deadpool backup chapters were subsequently released as a stand-alone one-shot.

- What If? Iron Man: Demon in an Armor
  - What if Tony Stark became Doctor Doom?
  - What if the Venom symbiote had managed to control Deadpool? (back-up story Part 1)
- What If? Wolverine: Father
  - What if Wolverine had known about and raised Daken from birth?
  - What if the Venom symbiote had managed to control Deadpool? (back-up story Part 2)
- What If? Spider-Man: Grim Hunt
  - What if Spider-Man had decided to kill Kraven the Hunter instead of letting him live?
  - What if the Venom symbiote had managed to control Deadpool? (back-up story Part 3)
- What If? Dark Reign – The Osborn Assassination
  - What if Clint Barton had managed to kill Norman Osborn?
  - What if the Venom symbiote had managed to control Deadpool? (back-up story Part 4)
- What If? #200
  - What if Norman Osborn had won the Siege on Asgard?
  - What if the Watcher had killed Galactus?

== What If?: Avengers vs. X-Men (2013) ==
In July 2013, Marvel released a four-issue miniseries for What If based on the 2012 event Avengers vs X-Men, telling the story of what might have happened if Magneto had been more influential in Hope's development for Phoenix.

== What If: Age of Ultron (2014) ==
In April 2014, Marvel released a five-issue miniseries for the 2013 event Age of Ultron, focusing on Wolverine and the Invisible Woman's trip back in time to kill Hank Pym in order to stop him from creating Ultron and showing the effects for the Marvel Universe if one of the other four founding Avengers had died, or if Hank had simply chosen not to create Ultron at all.

- What if the Wasp had been killed instead of Hank Pym?
- What if Iron Man had been killed instead of Hank Pym?
- What if Thor had been killed instead of Hank Pym?
- What if Captain America had been killed instead of Hank Pym?
- What if Hank Pym had never created Ultron at all?

== What If? Infinity (2015) ==
In October 2015, Marvel released a five-issue miniseries for the 2013 event Infinity that depicted alternate outcomes for Thanos' invasion of Earth and the war with the Builders. The five scenarios are the following:

- What if Thanos had joined the Avengers?
- What if Black Bolt had betrayed Earth?
- What if the X-Men were the sole survivors of Infinity?
- What if the Guardians of the Galaxy tried to free Thanos?
- What if the Green Goblin stole the Infinity Gauntlet?

== What If? With Great Power (2018) ==
What If? one-shot issues in October 2018 include:

- What if Flash Thompson became Spider-Man?
- What if the X-Men were .EXE/Men?
- What if Peter Parker became the Punisher?
- What if Marvel Comics went Metal with the Ghost Rider?
- What if Thor was raised by Frost Giants?
- What if Magik became the Sorcerer Supreme?

The 13th series was later collected into a trade paperback entitled What If...?: With Great Power featuring the cover from the Punisher one-shot.

== Spider-Man: Spider's Shadow (2021) ==
In 2021, Marvel published a five-issue miniseries titled Spider-Man: Spider's Shadow, detailing what if Peter Parker fully accepted the alien symbiote and became Venom. While it did not have the published title of What If?, it did have the branding on the cover as What If...? Spider-Man: Spider's Shadow.

== What If...? Miles Morales (2022) ==
In 2022, Marvel published a five-issue miniseries exploring what would happen if Miles Morales had acquired the powers of different Marvel super-heroes. The first four issues saw him become Captain America, Wolverine, Hulk, and Thor, and the final issue was a team-up between the four divergent Miles and the mainstream Spider-Man Miles. Collected as What If...? Miles Morales, the series' "What If...? Miles Morales... Became Thor?!" storyline received negative criticism for racist dialogue and imagery from its white and Hispanic creative team.

- What if...? Miles Morales... Became Captain America?! #1
- What if...? Miles Morales... Became Wolverine?! #1
- What if...? Miles Morales... Became Hulk?! #1
- What if...? Miles Morales... Became Thor?! #1
- What if...? Miles Morales... Teamed Up With Miles Morales?! #1

== What If...? Dark (2023) ==
In 2023, Marvel published six one-shots under the title What If... Dark?, which revisited iconic Marvel stories with a darker twist.

- What if Loki wielded Mjolnir??
- What if Gwen Stacy didn't die on the bridge that day, but Spider-Man did?
- What If Ben Grimm became Venom?
- What if Moon Knight did not survive his battle with Bushman?
- What if Cortland Kasady became Carnage?
- What if Dracula transformed Blade into a vampire?

== Aliens: What If...? (2024) ==
In 2024, Marvel announced that What If...? would move beyond solely the Marvel Universe to explore alternate takes on the continuities of other franchises owned by their parent company The Walt Disney Company, beginning with Aliens: What If…?, based on the Alien franchise, the first five-issue arc of which would explore the scenario "What If... Carter Burke had lived?", exploring what would happen if the character of Carter Burke had survived the events of the 1986 film Aliens, with the series to be written by the character's actor Paul Reiser, his son Leon Reiser, as well as Adam F. Goldberg, Brian Volk-Weiss, and Hans Rodionoff, with art by Guiu Vilanova.

== What If...? Venom (2024) ==
In 2024, Marvel announced a five-issue miniseries exploring what would happen if the Venom symbiote had bonded with different Marvel super-heroes. Over the course of the run, the symbiote will bond with She-Hulk, Wolverine, Doctor Strange, Loki, and Moon Knight in a single continuity.

== Marvel & Disney: What if...? (2024–2025) ==
From July 2024 to July 2025, Marvel published an ongoing What If...? series exploring what would happen if classic Disney characters had acquired the powers of different Marvel super-heroes.

- What if...? Donald Duck Became Wolverine #1: "Old Duck Donald" (July 2024)
- What If...? Donald Duck Became Thor #1: (September 2024)
- What If...? Minnie Became Captain Marvel #1: "The Awesome Origin of Minnie Captain Marvel!" (November 2024)
- What If...? Mickey & Friends Became the Fantastic Four #1: (January 2024)
- What If...? Mickey & Friends Became the Avengers #1: (March 2025)
- What If...? Donald Duck Became Iron Man #1: (May 2025)
- What If...? Goofy Became Spider-Man #1: (July 2025)

== Volume 20 (2026) ==
In the summer of 2026, Marvel released eight new What If...? one-shots to celebrate the series' 50th anniversary.

- What If...? Uncanny X-Men #1: "What if Cyclops stayed with Madeline Prior?" (June 2026)
- What If...? Thor #1: "What if Thor got Spider-Man's Symbiote suit?" (June 2026)
- What If...? Secret Wars #1: "What if the Ultimate universe survived the Secret Wars?" (July 2026)
- What If...? Jessica Jones #1: "What if Jessica Jones was bitten by the radioactive spider?" (July 2026)
- What If...? Spider-Man #1: "What if Kraven survived his last hunt?" (July 2026)
- What If...? Captain America #1: "What if Captain America was revived in 2099?" (August 2026)
- What If...? Runways #1: "What if the Runaways hadn't run away?" (August 2026)
- What If...? X-Men #1: "What if Cassandra Nova killed Professor X?" (August 2026)
