= Ariel Olivetti =

Argentine comic book penciller (born 1967)

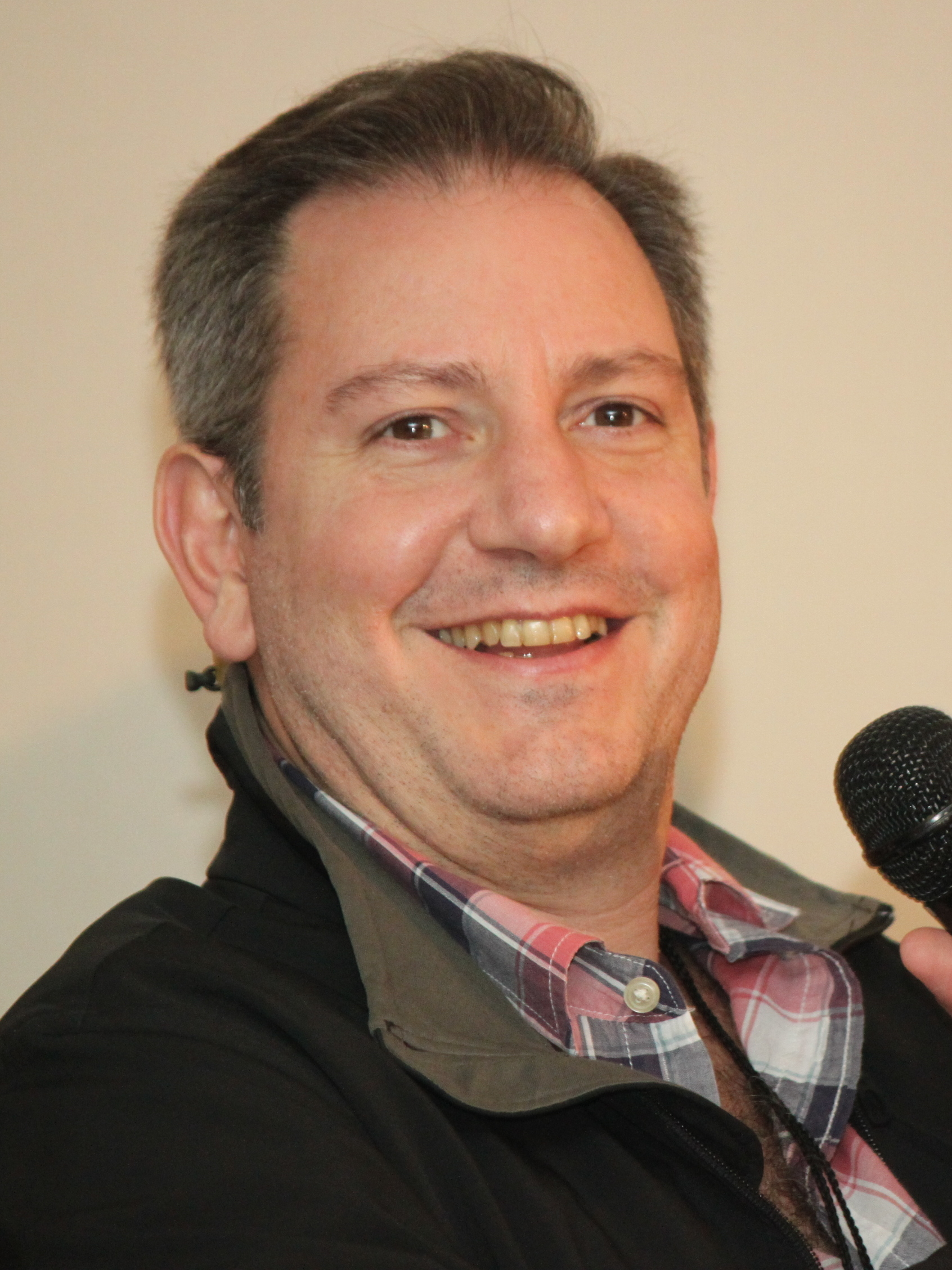
- Olivetti at the Florida Supercon in 2012
- Born: Buenos Aires
- Areas: Penciller, Painter
- Notable works: Last Avengers Story; Cable; Cazador; Punisher War Journal; Space Ghost

Ariel Olivetti (born November 15, 1967) is an Argentine comic book penciller best known for his work on American comic book titles such as Daredevil, X-Man, Space Ghost and Punisher War Journal.

== Career ==
Olivetti studied Graphic Design in college and first had his work published in the Argentine magazine Fierro.

His first work in USA was 1995's The Last Avengers Story, which was written by Peter David and published by Marvel Comics. He went on to have a brief stint as regular penciller on Marvel's Daredevil between 1997 and 1998, where he worked with writer Joe Kelly. His next major work was in 1998 when he worked with writer Steven Grant on the Warren Ellis devised "Counter X" revamp of Marvel's X-Man title. In 2005 he again collaborated with Joe Kelly on DC Comics Space Ghost limited series which revealed the character's origins for the first time.

Other titles he has worked on include Mystique and Sabretooth (1996), Alpha Flight (1997) and What If? (1997) at Marvel and JLA: Paradise Lost (1998), Haven: The Broken City (2002), Green Lantern (2003) and Batman: Legends of the Dark Knight (2006) at DC. In 1999, he collaborated with writer Mark Waid on The Kingdom (illustrating issue #1, with Mike Zeck illustrating issue #2), a sequel to Kingdom Come.

In 2006 he signed an exclusive contract with Marvel Comics and launched the second volume of Punisher War Journal with writer Matt Fraction. Olivetti did art on the first ten numbers. Other work for Marvel includes the Cable (vol. 2) ongoing series that debuted in March 2008, and more recently, Incredible Hulk, and Namor (vol. 3).

Throughout his career Olivetti has worked in different mediums, including black and white, digital color, acrylics and oils. Olivetti himself declared having been influenced by artists like Richard Corben, Simon Bisley and his fellow countryman Mauro Cascioli

In 2012 he collaborated with the comic book Hero Seeds, drawing two covers of the comics and several drawings in the same comics. In 2024, Olivetti did the art for the four issue mini comic book series for Dark House Comics, called The Writer, which had been written by Ben and Max Berkowitz and actor Josh Gad.

== Bibliography ==
=== DC ===
- Batman: Legends of the Dark Knight #207-211 (along with Mauro Cascioli, 2006)
- DCU: Brave New World #1 (among other artists) (2006)
- Elseworlds 80-Page Giant #1 (among other artists) (1999)
- Flash, vol. 2, 80-Page Giant #1 (among other artists) (1998)
- Future Quest Presents (Space Ghost) #1-3 (2017)
- G.I. Combat, vol. 2, #1 (2012)
- Haven (comics) The Broken City, miniseries, #1-9 (2002)
- JLA (Martian Manhunter) Annual #1 (1997)
- JLA:
  - Paradise Lost, miniseries, #1-3 (1998)
  - Primeval (1999)
- JLA/Haven:
  - Arrival (2002)
  - Anathema (2002)
- JLA Showcase 80-Page Giant #1 (among other artists) (2000)
- The Kingdom, 2-part miniseries, #1 (1999)
- Lobo #63-64 (1999)
- Martian Manhunter Annual #1 (1998)
- Space Ghost, miniseries, #1-6 (2005)
- Superman, vol. 2, #179 (2002)
- Superman Returns Prequel, 4-part miniseries, #1 (2006)
- Superman Secret Files and Origins 2005 (2006)

=== DC / Dark Horse ===
- Superman and Batman vs. Aliens and Predators, miniseries, #1-2 (2007)
- The Writer, miniseries, #1-4 (2024)

=== Marvel ===
- Alpha Flight, vol. 2, #11 (1997)
- Cable, vol. 2, #1-15 (2008–09)
- Daredevil (full art): #369, 371-372, 374; (among other artists): #375 (1997–98)
- Death of the Inhumans, miniseries, #1 (2018)
- Empyre: Captain America, miniseries, #1-3 (2020)
- Hercules: Fall of an Avenger, miniseries, #1-2 (2010)
- Incredible Hulk #601-605 (2009–10)
- Iron Man 2.0 #4-5, 8 (2011)
- Last Avengers Story, miniseries, #1-2 (1995)
- Mystique and Sabretooth, miniseries, #1-4 (1996–97)
- Namor, vol. 3, #1-3, 5 (2010-11)
- Punisher War Journal, vol. 2, #1-3, 5-10 (2007)
- Thor: Heaven & Earth, miniseries, #1 (2011)
- Ultimate Civil War: Spider-Man, one-shot (among other artists) (2007)
- What If? #88 (1996)
- X-Men: Declassified #1 (among other artists) (2000)
- X-Men Unlimited #12 (along with Steve Epting) (1996)
- X-Man #38 (with ChrisCross); #63, 66-73 (2000–01)
- X-Force #107 (2000)
- X-Factor, vol. 2, #7 (2006)
- Venom - Space Knight #1-4 (2015-16)

=== Other publishers ===
- Brutal Nature: Concrete Fury, miniseries, #1-4 (IDW, 2017)
- Conan and the People of the Black Circle, miniseries, #1-4 (Dark Horse, 2013-14)
- El Cazador de Aventuras #1-65 (gone along with Jorge Lucas, Mauro Cascioli and Claudio Ramírez) (Ediciones de la Urraca - Argentina, 1992–99)
- Fierro #?-? (Ediciones de la Urraca) (Note: This magazine (based on the concept of European publications such as Metal Hurlant) was published between 1984 and 1982 in Argentina.)
- ICH: Naturaleza Salvaje (Yermo Ediciones, 2016)
