= Olive theory =

Theory on relationship compatibility

The olive theory is a tongue-in-cheek relationship theory stating two individuals are compatible, romantically or platonically, when one party hides their enjoyment of olives so their partner who also enjoys olives can have more of them. If one individual gives their partner the olives on their plate, the relationship is balanced and a good match. The phrase saw a rise in popularity in early 2024 on TikTok, though it is mostly known for its appearance in the pilot episode of How I Met Your Mother. Marshall gives his olives to Lily because she likes them and leads her to believe he dislikes them. Later on in the show, after being caught by Barney, it is revealed Marshall does like olives but sacrifices this to make Lily happy.

== Origin ==
=== Paul Reiser ===
The term was first coined by comedian Paul Reiser in his 1994 book Couplehood.

=== How I Met Your Mother ===
The phrase is most known for its appearance in the Pilot episode of CBS sitcom How I Met Your Mother which first aired on September 19 2005. In the scene, Ted tells the story of his first date with Robin to Lily and Marshall. Ted states that since Robin does not like olives but he does, they are compatible. Lily and Marshall add on that the olive theory works in their relationship, as Marshall always gives Lily his olives. However, it is later said that Marshall only pretended not to like them to make Lily happy.

== Online trend ==
TikTok has been the main platform for sharing how the olive theory presents itself in actual relationships and friendships. Creators have taken the liberty of getting creative with the concept by interchanging olives with whatever food or other characteristic applies to their dynamic with another person. These videos act as a fun way to demonstrate how they fit with others, how their relationship is stronger because of their small differences. Other similar trends include the orange peel theory.

== See also ==
- "Jack Sprat", which describes a similar idea
- Opposites attract
- TikTok Food Trends
