= The Last Avengers Story =

Marvel Comics mini-series

- Hank Pym on the cover of The Last Avengers Story #1 (Nov. 1995).

Publication information
- Publisher: Marvel Comics
- Format: Limited series
- Publication date: November – December 1995
- No. of issues: 2
- Main character: Avengers

Creative team
- Written by: Peter David
- Artist: Ariel Olivetti
- Letterer: Jim Novak
- Colorist(s): Ariel Olivetti; American Color
- Editor(s): Mark Gruenwald; Matt Hicks

Collected editions
- The Last Avengers Story: ISBN 0-7851-0218-3

The Last Avengers Story is a two-issue prestige format mini-series from Marvel Comics released in November and December 1995. It was written by Peter David and illustrated by Ariel Olivetti.

== Publication history ==
The series was written in 1986 by Peter David, but it was shelved due to editorial meddling with the plot. David wanted a character-driven story, but his editors wanted a more action driving storyline. The series was revived when it was published as part of the Alterniverse, a subset of the What If? comic book which focused upon darker, bleaker stories.

== Plot ==
The robot Ultron, wanting revenge on the superhero team the Avengers for constant defeats, places a document detailing their downfall in a time capsule. When the time-travelling villain Kang the Conqueror finds the document centuries later, and having been thwarted by the Avengers himself, he travels back to their time to kill the team. The old Avengers, however, have disbanded and been replaced by a less dedicated group. Kang kills the entire team by detonating a nuclear weapon over Avengers Mansion.

With many of the old Avengers such as Captain America, Thor, Iron Man, Quicksilver, and the Scarlet Witch either dead or missing, Hank Pym reluctantly forms another team. The unit consists of his wife the Wasp; Hawkeye and his wife Mockingbird; the mutant Cannonball; sorcerer Tommy Maximoff (son of the android Vision and the Scarlet Witch); Jessie Wingfoot (daughter of She-Hulk and Wyatt Wingfoot) and two mercenaries called Hotshot and Bombshell, supposed children of the Black Knight and Hercules respectively.

In a flashback, it is shown that Wonder Man and Tigra died in a fight with Hulk. After Hulk killed Tigra, Wonder Man sacrificed himself to kill him with radioactive fluid, killing them both and blinding Hawkeye.

Together Pym's team confronts Kang—now allied with Ultron, the new Grim Reaper and a creature called Oddball—and in a battle to the death, many of the Avengers are murdered before finally killing all the villains. Hawkeye discovers that Captain America, who was formerly President of the United States and believed assassinated, is still alive and recuperating, and had watched the entire battle.

== Collected editions ==
The series was collected into a trade paperback (ISBN 0-7851-0218-3) and the premiere hardcover Avengers: First To Last along with the Avengers Classic series (ISBN 0-7851-3652-5).
