= Jorge Lucas =

Uruguayan-Argentine artist

- Born: Jorge Luis Pereira Salto, Uruguay
- Areas: Penciller, Inker

Jorge Lucas (born January 22, 1963) is a Uruguayan-Argentine comic book artist. He was born in Salto, Uruguay, where he lived until the age of 10, when he moved to Argentina. He is well known both in his country, as the creator of the classic adult comic Cazador ("Hunter"), as well as internationally, for his work at Marvel Comics.

== Biography ==
Lucas first came to prominence in Argentina with his work on El Cazador de Aventuras, popularly known just as El Cazador, Cazador or just by its jokingly affectionate character nickname, "El Cazi". El Cazador was the highest-selling adult comic book in Argentina for several years. The series starred a character similar to DC Comics' Lobo, and featured artwork heavily influenced by Simon Bisley's style. On that title Lucas worked with Ariel Olivetti, Mauro Cascioli and Claudio Ramírez.

In the United States he is best known for his work for Marvel Comics on titles such as Inhumans, Mystique, Iron Man, The Avengers, Black Panther, The Incredible Hulk and Wolverine (Lucas' favorite character). He painted the art of The Darkness: Shadows and Flame, written by Rob Levin (for Top Cow Comics). Lucas also wrote the script for an independent movie based on his creation El Cazador, which was finally released in 2019, with Luis María Montanari playing the eponymous character.

== Bibliography ==
=== Image ===
- Darkness #79 (2009)
- Darkness, vol. 3, #7–10 (2009)
- Darkness: Shadows and Flame (2010)
- Ripclaw Pilot Season #1 (2007)

=== Marvel ===
- Annihilation: Ronan, miniseries, #1–4 (2006)
- Black Panther #46–47, 51–54 (2002–03)
- Civil War: Front Line, miniseries (Nighthawk) #6 (2006)
- Fantastic Four: World's Greatest Comics Magazine #1–2, 12 (2001–02)
- Incredible Hulk, vol. 2, #83–86, Annual 2001 (2001–05)
- Iron Man, vol. 3, #73–78, 83–85 (2004)
- Mystique #1–6 (2003)
- New Invaders #6 (2005)
- Starjammers, miniseries, #2–6 (2004–05)
- Wolverine #180 (2002)
- Wolverine: Xisle, miniseries, #1–5 (2003)
- X-Force #110–115 (2001)
- X-Men: Colossus Bloodline, miniseries, #1–5 (2005–06)
