= Cazador (comics) =

- First issue of El Cazador de aventuras ("the adventures hunter"), 1992

Publication information
- Publisher: Deux Studios
- First appearance: 1992
- Created by: Jorge Lucas

In-story information
- Abilities: Superhuman strength, stamina, and durability. Regenerative healing factor. Immortality

Cazador (Spanish: Hunter), also known as tzayád jazót se'irím (צַיָּד חָזוֹת שְׂעִירִים) originally published as Cazador de Aventuras (Spanish: Adventure Hunter), is an Argentine black humor-action comic published from 1992 to 2010, during different time periods. It is famous for initiating a new age of adult comics in Argentina, where it was one of the best-selling and popular comics at its heyday, during the 90s. It was created by Jorge Lucas, and it was written and illustrated by Lucas, Mauro Cascioli and Claudio Ramirez. The comic consists of three volumes.

== Fictional Character Biography ==
A possible origin of the character was revealed in a flashback: His grandfather had been a soldier in Vlad Tepes's service (from whom he had learned the many ways of torture). His father had been a conquistador who came to America and sired him with a native girl whose tribe had cannibalistic tendencies. Finally, the man who'd come to be known as El Cazador de Aventuras became a wanted criminal in America during the times of the Spanish conquest. He formed a band of outlaws and massacred many native villages thus obtaining food. One of his favorite pastimes was to torture natives branding them with red hot irons on their foreheads. The brand was a Christian cross. He claimed to be doing God's work that way. One of the natives claimed he knew where a great mountain of precious metal was and promised to take them in exchange for his life. Believing it to be the famous legend of El Dorado, Cazador and his men followed their guide only to fall into a trap. Cazador was captured and branded with his own symbol inverted on the forehead. Demons were introduced in his body and he became essentially immortal. After his ordeal, he went insane, killed his own men and devoured them.

Almost 500 years later, he lives in an abandoned church, uses the inverted cross as his symbol, and has become an unstoppable serial killer. Despite this, he has some friends like the bizarre Italian-American mobster called Tío Pastafrola.

== Publication history ==
=== Volume one (1992-1999) ===
The first issue of Cazador appeared in October 1992. Artist Ariel Olivetti was part of the team of illustrators during the first seven issues.

The star of the title is a big, dumb, murderous, womanizing brute, considered as a homage/parody of DC Comics' antihero Lobo, as well as the art of Simon Bisley, one of the main artists on Lobo, whose artwork strongly influenced the creator of Cazador. The episodes contained high levels of dark and gross humor, focused on parodying the socio-political environment in Argentina, as well as many elements and personalities of pop-culture, world history and mythology (zombies, the Quake videogame, Sailor Moon, Diego Maradona, former Argentine President Carlos Menem, Don King, Superman, Nippur de Lagash, Thor and Ragnarök, Mike Tyson, etc.) while telling adventures with extreme levels of violence and gore.

The first seven issues were in black and white, but in 1995 the first color issues appeared. The comic ceased publication because of a great debt that the authors owed to the publisher.

=== Volume two (2000-2001) ===
The comic returned in November 2000 drawn by Mauro Cascioli. There were no great changes, and aside from more a detailed drawing style and a slightly larger format. The comic kept the same tone as the first edition/volume. The final issue appeared on December 22, 2001.

=== Powers and abilities ===
Cazador's greatest power comes in the form of an Indian curse that wouldn't let him die. Cazador is almost 500 years old, yet he remains in the same age and physical state he was when the curse was first set upon him.

The curse not only prevents his aging, but also allows him to survive without the need of food or drink.

He is still physically vulnerable, though, which means that he can be temporarily “killed” by severely damaging his body, but he will always come back, seemingly regenerating his body entirely in the process.

The way his immortality power works, however, is not totally understood, as it has manifested in several different ways through the years. Sometimes, Cazador has been reduced to merely a fleshy torso and head, and somehow remained alive. Other times, he would be “killed” by simply punching a hole through his chest.

On another occasion, he took a point-blank handgun headshot, without showing any signs of brain damage, yet some time later, he suffered temporary amnesia when losing a chunk of his brain, after a demon struck his head with a war hammer.

Even his body regeneration seems erratic at times: on one of the occasions he revived, his eyes and lower limbs were missing, and did not regenerate at all, requiring him to eventually “borrow” eyes and legs from innocent bystanders to fully recover. It is possible that the “unreliability” of his immortality is associated with its status as a curse, thus effectively becoming a torment for his bearer, rather than a grim, but effective benefit.

Cazador's regenerative skills were also the responsible of creating one of his greatest foes: Final (The Ultimate Abomination), a “brother” born of a cyst that was surgically removed from Cazador's behind on issue #9, and later grew all by itself into a full humanoid shape. This monstrosity has displayed regenerative skills as efficient as those of Cazador himself, coming back several times after being apparently killed for real.

As descendant of a deadly family of mercenaries, and due to the harsh lifestyle he had since childhood, Cazador has become a master in the use of all kinds of weaponry. Cazador's skills range from machine-guns, to knives, to broad swords.

In the past, his weapon of choice was a huge automatic revolver, packed with great firepower, but prone to getting stuck in the middle of battle. This gun was eventually eaten, on issue #3, by one of Cazador's major enemies, the Swearing Demon Balrog, and was never seen again since.

From there on, and despite the fact that he has a seemingly endless cache of weapons stacked below the dungeons of his cathedral (including ACME “Atomik” grenades), Cazador didn't carry a “weapon of choice” anymore, instead relying on what opportunity could bring upon him. Although it is known he has sometimes hidden small handguns in his underpants, just in case of an emergency. This contingency allowed him to survive against seemingly overwhelming odds on issue #29, when he was surrounded by the whole Mortal Kombat roster on the island of the ninja warlord Sinister Claw.

Despite not having any formal type of training in unarmed combat, Cazador still manages to defeat most of his enemies by sheer brute force alone (and he has a lot of sheer brute force to share). He is a brawler in the purest sense of the word.

Still, his lack of true fighting skills take its toll when Cazador is forced to fight in earnest against opponents as strong and powerful as him, who have been known to overwhelm him with relative ease. Besides his arch-enemy, the Demon Lord Melkor, Cazador has been brought down by the zombie Indian Cacique Patoruzú, his “brother”, Abominación Final, a group of anonymous ninja assassins, and the cyborg boxer Mike Tyson, in the rematch bout they had (although Tyson ultimately lost the fight because Cazador's friend and trainer, Argentine former boxer “Roña” Osvaldo, KO’ed him with a lead pipe).
