= What If (comics) =

Comic book anthology series from Marvel Comics

- Cover to What If? #1 (February 1977), art by George Pérez and Joe Sinnott

Publication information
- Publisher: Marvel Comics
- Schedule: Monthly
- Format: (vol. 1–2); Ongoing series (vol. 3–9); One-shots
- Genre: Superhero
- Publication date: (vol. 1); February 1977 – October 1984 (vol. 2); July 1989 – November 1998
- No. of issues: (vol. 1); 47 (plus #0) (vol. 2); 114 (plus #−1) (vol. 3–4; 13; 16; 20); 6 (vol. 5–9; 11–12; 14–15; 17–18); 5 (vol. 10); 4 (vol. 19); 7

Collected editions
- What If? Classic: Volume 1: ISBN 0-7851-1702-4

What If, sometimes stylized as What If...?, is a comic book anthology series published by Marvel Comics whose stories explore how the Marvel Universe might have unfolded if key moments in its history had not occurred as they did in mainstream continuity. Since What If debuted in 1977, the comics have been published in 18 series as well as occasional stand-alone issues. In 2024, Marvel announced that What If...? would expand to include alternate explorations of continuity within other non-Marvel Universe properties owned by their parent company The Walt Disney Company from its seventeenth volume onwards, beginning with Aliens: What If…?, based on the Alien franchise, and followed by Marvel & Disney: What if...?, based on classic Disney characters.

A spin-off of What If...? titled Spider-Girl and focused on Mayday Parker premiered in October 1998, in-turn launching the MC2 franchise. Several characters and character concepts originating in What If...? have later been adapted to the main Marvel continuity, including Skarr, Son of Hulk and Jane Foster as Thor. From 2021 to 2024, an animated series based on the What If comics premiered on Disney+, set in the Marvel Cinematic Universe's multiverse.

== Format ==
The stories of the inaugural series (1977–1984) feature the alien Uatu, the Watcher as a narrator. From his base on the Moon, Uatu observes both Earth and alternate realities.

Most What If stories begin with Uatu describing an event in the mainstream Marvel Universe, then introducing a point of divergence in that event and then describing the consequences of the divergence. Some stories diverge from another divergence, such as What If Vol 1 #43 (Conan the Barbarian remains in the modern era), which diverges from #13 (Conan travels to then returns from the modern era).

Uatu was used similarly in the second series (1989–1998) until a point where, in the Fantastic Four comic book, Uatu was punished for destroying another Watcher. This made the use of Uatu improbable, so the character was phased out to its last appearance in issue #76. Without a framing device, the stories themselves became the focus.

In later series, some writers chose to introduce alternative narrators. For example, in volume 3, in What If Karen Page Had Lived?, What If Jessica Jones Had Joined the Avengers? and in Daredevil (2005), Brian Michael Bendis, the writer himself, makes a cameo as narrator. In the early 2006 series, a hacker, whose online alias is "the Watcher", opens each of the six issues.

Marvel has given several What If stories official numerical designations to make them contiguous with the Marvel Multiverse and differentiate them from the main Marvel Universe of Earth-616.

Marvel Comics occasionally issued backup features, Untold Tales from the Marvel Universe. These stories explained the origins of some of Marvel's superhuman species.

== Publication history ==
=== Volume 1 ===
The initial 47-issue series ran from February 1977 to October 1984. The first What If story was "What If Spider-Man had Joined the "Fantastic Four?". It presented an alternate version of events seen in The Amazing Spider-Man #1 (1963). What If #24, which is titled "What If Gwen Stacy had lived?" and focuses on the consequences of Spider-Man's secret identity being publicly exposed, is one of the most highly regarded What If stories.

==== List of What If? stories ====
Issue #	A story	B story	C story	TPB	Omnibus
1	What If Spider-Man Had Joined the Fantastic Four? Collected in Fantastic Four Omnibus Vol 6			What If: The Complete Collection Vol. 1	What If?: The Original Marvel Series Omnibus Vol. 1
2	What If the Hulk Had The Brain of Bruce Banner?			What If: The Complete Collection Vol. 1	What If?: The Original Marvel Series Omnibus Vol. 1
3	What If The Avengers Had Never Been? Collected in Avengers Omnibus Vol 6			What If: The Complete Collection Vol. 1	What If?: The Original Marvel Series Omnibus Vol. 1
4	What If the Invaders Had Stayed Together After World War Two?			What If: The Complete Collection Vol. 1	What If?: The Original Marvel Series Omnibus Vol. 1
5	What If Captain America Hadn't Vanished During World War Two? Collected in Invaders Omnibus, Captain America Omnibus Vol.5			What If: The Complete Collection Vol. 1	What If?: The Original Marvel Series Omnibus Vol. 1
6	What If the Fantastic Four Had Different Super-Powers? Collected in Fantastic Four Omnibus Vol 6			What If: The Complete Collection Vol. 1	What If?: The Original Marvel Series Omnibus Vol. 1
7	What If Someone Else Besides Spider-Man Had Been Bitten By The Radioactive Spider?			What If: The Complete Collection Vol. 1	What If?: The Original Marvel Series Omnibus Vol. 1
8	What If the World Knew Daredevil Was Blind?	What If the Spider Had Been Bitten By a Radioactive Human?		What If: The Complete Collection Vol. 1	What If?: The Original Marvel Series Omnibus Vol. 1
9	What If... the Avengers Had Been Formed During the 1950s? Collected in Avengers Omnibus Vol 6			What If: The Complete Collection Vol. 1	What If?: The Original Marvel Series Omnibus Vol. 1
10	What If Jane Foster Had Found—the Hammer of Thor?			What If: The Complete Collection Vol. 1	What If?: The Original Marvel Series Omnibus Vol. 1
11	What If the Fantastic Four Were the Original Marvel Bullpen? Collected in Fantastic Four Omnibus Vol 6			What If: The Complete Collection Vol. 1	What If?: The Original Marvel Series Omnibus Vol. 1
12	What If Rick Jones Had Become the Hulk?			What If: The Complete Collection Vol. 1	What If?: The Original Marvel Series Omnibus Vol. 1
13	What If Conan the Barbarian Walked the Earth Today? Collected in Conan the Barbarian: The Original Marvel Years Omnibus Vol 4			What If: The Complete Collection Vol 2	What If?: The Original Marvel Series Omnibus Vol. 1
14	What If Sgt. Fury and His Howling Commandos Had Fought World War II in Outer Space?			What If: The Complete Collection Vol 2	What If?: The Original Marvel Series Omnibus Vol. 1
15	What If... Nova Had Been Four Other People?			What If: The Complete Collection Vol 2	What If?: The Original Marvel Series Omnibus Vol. 1
16	What If Shang-Chi, Master of Kung Fu, Had Remained Loyal to Fu Manchu?			Shang-Chi Master of Kung-Fu Omnibus #3	Due to copyright issues, Sax Rohmer's Dr. Fu Manchu became Zheng Zu, a character owned by Marvel. Marvel was able to reprint the story after a temporary license, in Marvel's Voices: Identity #1 (2021). Writer Gene Luen Yang revisited the story, changing names such as the aforementioned Zheng Zu, and the Si-Fan into the Five Weapons Society.
17	What If Ghost Rider Had Remained a Villain? Collected in Ghost Rider Epic Collection Vol 3: Death Race	What if Spider-Woman Had Remained a Villain? Collected in Spider-Woman Omnibus	What If Captain Marvel Had Remained a Villain? Collected in The Death of Captain Marvel Omnibus	What If: The Complete Collection Vol 2	What If?: The Original Marvel Series Omnibus Vol. 1
18	What If Dr. Strange Had Been a Disciple of Dormammu?			What If: The Complete Collection Vol 2	What If?: The Original Marvel Series Omnibus Vol. 1
19	What If Spider-Man Had Stopped the Burglar Who Killed His Uncle?			What If: The Complete Collection Vol 2	What If?: The Original Marvel Series Omnibus Vol. 1
20	What If the Avengers Had Fought the Kree-Skrull War Without Rick Jones?			What If: The Complete Collection Vol 2	What If?: The Original Marvel Series Omnibus Vol. 1
21	What If Sub-Mariner Had Married the Invisible Girl?			What If: The Complete Collection Vol 2	What If?: The Original Marvel Series Omnibus Vol. 1
22	What If Dr. Doom Had Become a Hero?			What If: The Complete Collection Vol 2	What If?: The Original Marvel Series Omnibus Vol. 1
23	What If Hulk's Girlfriend Jarella Had Not Died?	The First Eternals Collected in The Eternals: The Complete Saga Omnibus	What If Aunt May Had Been Bitten By a Radioactive Spider? Collected in Amazing Spider-Man Omnibus Vol 7	What If: The Complete Collection Vol 2	What If?: The Original Marvel Series Omnibus Vol. 2
24	What If Spider-Man Had Rescued Gwen Stacy? Collected in Amazing Spider-Man Omnibus Vol 7	The First Eternals Collected in The Eternals: The Complete Saga Omnibus		What If: The Complete Collection Vol 3	What If?: The Original Marvel Series Omnibus Vol. 2
25	What If Thor Fought Odin Over Jane Foster?	The First Eternals Collected in The Eternals: The Complete Saga Omnibus		What If: The Complete Collection Vol 3	What If?: The Original Marvel Series Omnibus Vol. 2
26	What If Captain America Were Elected President? Collected in Captain America Omnibus Vol.5	The First Eternals Collected in The Eternals: The Complete Saga Omnibus	What If the Man-Thing Had Regained Ted Sallis' Brain?	What If: The Complete Collection Vol 3	What If?: The Original Marvel Series Omnibus Vol. 2
27	What If Phoenix Had Not Died? Collected in Phoenix Omnibus and Dark Phoenix Saga Omnibus	The First Eternals Collected in The Eternals: The Complete Saga Omnibus		What If: The Complete Collection Vol 3	What If?: The Original Marvel Series Omnibus Vol. 2
28	What If Ghost Rider Were Separated from Johnny Blaze? Collected in Marvel Masterworks Ghost Rider Vol. 7 and Ghost Rider Epic Collection Vol 4: To Slay a Demon	The First Eternals Collected in The Eternals: The Complete Saga Omnibus	Matt Murdock, Agent of... S.H.I.E.L.D. Collected in Marvel Masterworks Daredevil Vol 16 and Daredevil by Frank Miller and Klaus Janson Omnibus	What If: The Complete Collection Vol 3	What If?: The Original Marvel Series Omnibus Vol. 2
29	What If Avengers Were the Last Superheroes on Earth?	Collected in The Eternals: The Complete Saga Omnibus; Marvel Masterworks: The Inhumans Vol 2	What If... Sub-Mariner Never Regained His Memory?	What If: The Complete Collection Vol 3	What If?: The Original Marvel Series Omnibus Vol. 2
30	What If Spider-Man's Clone Lived? Collected in Amazing Spider-Man Omnibus Vol 7	Collected in The Eternals: The Complete Saga Omnibus; Marvel Masterworks: The Inhumans Vol 2		What If: The Complete Collection Vol 3	What If?: The Original Marvel Series Omnibus Vol. 2
31	What If Wolverine Had Killed the Hulk?	What If There Was No Fantastic Four?		What If: The Complete Collection Vol 3	What If?: The Original Marvel Series Omnibus Vol. 2
32	What If the Avengers Had Become the Pawns of Korvac?			What If: The Complete Collection Vol 3	What If?: The Original Marvel Series Omnibus Vol. 2
33	What If the Dazzler Had Become the Herald of Galactus? Collected in Marvel Masterworks: Dazzler Vol. 2 and Dazzler Omnibus	What If Iron Man Had Been Trapped in King Arthur's Time?		What If: The Complete Collection Vol 3	What If?: The Original Marvel Series Omnibus Vol. 2
34	All-humor issue with 74 stories			What If: The Complete Collection Vol 3	What If?: The Original Marvel Series Omnibus Vol. 2
35	What If Bullseye Had Not Killed Elektra? Collected in Marvel Masterworks Daredevil Vol. 16; Daredevil by Frank Miller and Klaus Janson; Daredevil Epic Collection Vol 9: Resurrection; and What If: Dark Avengers	And Thus Are Born the Cat People!	What If Yellowjacket Had Died?	What If: The Complete Collection Vol 3	What If?: The Original Marvel Series Omnibus Vol. 2
36	What If The Fantastic Four Had Not Gained Their Powers? Collected in Fantastic Four by John Byrne Omnibus Vol 2 and Fantastic Four Epic Collection Vol 13: Back to Basics	What If Nova Had Not Given Up His Powers? Collected in Nova: Richard Rider Omnibus		What If: The Complete Collection Vol 4	What If?: The Original Marvel Series Omnibus Vol. 2
37	What If The Thing Had Continued To Mutate?	What If The Beast Had Truly Become A Beast?	What If Galactus Had Turned The Silver Surfer Back Into Norrin Radd?	What If: The Complete Collection Vol 4	What If?: The Original Marvel Series Omnibus Vol. 2
38	Vision & Scarlet Witch "The Leaving"	What If Sharon Carter Had Not Died?	Daredevil: 2013	What If: The Complete Collection Vol 4	What If?: The Original Marvel Series Omnibus Vol. 2
39	What If Thor of Asgard Had Met Conan the Barbarian? Collected in Conan the Barbarian: The Original Marvel Years Omnibus Vol 5			What If: The Complete Collection Vol 4	What If?: The Original Marvel Series Omnibus Vol. 2
40	What if Dr. Strange Had Never Become Master of the Mystic Arts?			What If: The Complete Collection Vol 4	What If?: The Original Marvel Series Omnibus Vol. 2
41	What If Sub-Mariner Had Saved Atlantis from Its Destiny?			What If: The Complete Collection Vol 4	What If?: The Original Marvel Series Omnibus Vol. 2
42	What If Susan Richards Had Died in Childbirth?			What If: The Complete Collection Vol 4	What If?: The Original Marvel Series Omnibus Vol. 2
43	What If Conan the Barbarian Were Stranded in the 20th Century? Collected in Conan the Barbarian: The Original Marvel Years Omnibus Vol 6	Dr. Strange, Silver Surfer, Phoenix in "Behold"		What If: The Complete Collection Vol 4	What If?: The Original Marvel Series Omnibus Vol. 2
44	What If Captain America Were Not Revived Until Today?			What If: The Complete Collection Vol 4	What If?: The Original Marvel Series Omnibus Vol. 2
45	What If the Hulk Went Berserk?			What If: The Complete Collection Vol 4	What If?: The Original Marvel Series Omnibus Vol. 2
46	What If Spider-Man's Uncle Ben Had Lived?			What If: The Complete Collection Vol 4	What If?: The Original Marvel Series Omnibus Vol. 2
47	What If Loki Found Thor's Hammer First?			What If: The Complete Collection Vol 4	What If?: The Original Marvel Series Omnibus Vol. 2

What If (vol. 2) #105 (February 1998), the debut of Spider-Girl, cover art by Ron Frenz

=== Special ===
Following the cancellation of the original series, Marvel published a one-shot What If? Special (June 1988) with the story "What If Iron Man Had Been a Traitor?". It is collected in What If? Into the Multiverse Omnibus Vol 1.

=== Volume 2 ===
From July 1989 to November 1998, Marvel published 115 monthly What If issues (114 issues plus a #-1 issue) the second series revisited and revised ideas from volume 1. In volume 2, stories could span multiple issues (every issue of volume 1 contained a complete story). Also, sometimes, the volume 2 stories would offer multiple plots and endings and the reader could decide which one to adopt. For example, in What If the War Machine had not destroyed the Living Laser?, three endings were offered.

The humorous aspect of volume 1 was retained through volume 2, particularly in issue #34, an all-humor issue containing a number of single-page gags and two complete stories.

Starting with issue #87, the issue titles stopped being questions that were answered by the story, and instead the covers were presented as "What If? Starring..." whatever character was being highlighted in the given issue.

In issue #105, What If introduced Spider-Girl (Mayday Parker); the new character was popular enough for a spin-off series. From this, the MC2 line of publications was developed.

For a brief period between 1995 and 1996, all What If? stories were labeled as Marvel Alterniverse which included the likes of Ruins, The Last Avengers Story and Punisher Kills the Marvel Universe.

==== List of What If? (vol. 2) stories ====
Issue #	A story	B stories	Reprints
1	What If... The Avengers Had Lost the Evolutionary War?		Collected in What If? Into the Multiverse Omnibus Vol. 1
2	What If... Daredevil Had Killed The Kingpin?		Collected in What If? Into the Multiverse Omnibus Vol. 1
3	What If... Steve Rogers Had Refused to Give Up Being Captain America?	What If... Ben Parker's Nephew Was Galactus? What If... Franklin Richards Had Found the Hammer of Thor? What If... Wolverine Got a Real Job?	Collected in What If? Into the Multiverse Omnibus Vol. 1
4	What If... The Alien Costume Had Possessed Spider-Man? Collected in Secret Wars Omnibus		Collected in What If? Into the Multiverse Omnibus Vol. 1
5	What If... The Vision Had Destroyed the Avengers?	What If the Incredible Hulk—Instead of Becoming a Leg-breaker in Las Vegas—Had Become a High School Monitor?	Collected in What If? Into the Multiverse Omnibus Vol. 1
6	What If... The X-Men Had Lost Inferno?		Collected in What If? Into the Multiverse Omnibus Vol. 1
7	What If... Wolverine Was an Agent of SHIELD? Collected in Marvel Universe by Rob Liefeld Omnibus	What If... Aunt May Was a Mutant with Claws! What If... Captain America Hadn't Been Thawed Out? What If... the Punisher Didn't Use Guns?	Collected in What If? Into the Multiverse Omnibus Vol. 1
8	What If... Iron Man Lost the Armor Wars?		Collected in What If? Into the Multiverse Omnibus Vol. 1
9	What If... The New X-Men Had Died On Their Very First Mission? Collected in Giant-Size X-Men 40th Anniversary	What If? Black Bolt talked in his sleep? What If? The Thing's body kept mutating?	Collected in What If? Into the Multiverse Omnibus Vol. 1
10	What If... The Punisher's Family Had Not Been Killed?	What If... The Living Recorder Had to Find Work on Earth? What If... The Thing Were an Elvis Presley Impersonator? What If... Hawkeye Used Golf Clubs Instead of a Bow and Arrows?	Collected in What If? Into the Multiverse Omnibus Vol. 1
11	What If... The Fantastic Four All Had The Same Power?		Collected in What If? Into the Multiverse Omnibus Vol. 1
12	What If... The X-Men Had Stayed In Asgard?		Collected in What If? Into the Multiverse Omnibus Vol. 1
13	What If... Professor X Had Become the Juggernaut?		Collected in What If? Into the Multiverse Omnibus Vol. 1
14	What If... Captain Marvel Had Not Died? Collected in The Death of Captain Marvel Omnibus		Collected in What If? Into the Multiverse Omnibus Vol. 1
15	What If... The Trial of Galactus Had Ended in Reed Richards' Execution?		Collected in What If? Into the Multiverse Omnibus Vol. 1
16	What If... Wolverine Battled Conan the Barbarian? Collected in Conan the Barbarian: The Original Marvel Years Omnibus Vol 9		Collected in What If? Into the Multiverse Omnibus Vol. 1
17	What If... Kraven The Hunter Had Killed Spider-Man?	What If? the Living Recorder Had to Work on Earth? Part II What If? Daredevil Had a Dishonest Tailor?	Collected in What If? Into the Multiverse Omnibus Vol. 1
18	What If... The Fantastic Four Battled Dr. Doom Before They Gained Their Powers?	What If? the Puppet Master Used Real Puppets? What If? the Punisher Got Funky?	Collected in What If? Into the Multiverse Omnibus Vol. 1
19	What If... The Vision Had Conquered the World?		Collected in What If? Into the Multiverse Omnibus Vol. 1
20	What If... The Amazing Spider-Man Had Not Married Mary Jane?	What If? Spider-Man Had a Son? What If? Ghost Rider Hit a Puddle? What If? Daredevil (untitled) What If... Namor Worked As a Stunt Double for Mr. Spock?	Collected in What If? Into the Multiverse Omnibus Vol. 1
21	What If... Spider-Man Married the Black Cat?		Collected in What If? Into the Multiverse Omnibus Vol. 1
22	What If... The Silver Surfer Had Not Escaped Earth?		Collected in What If? Into the Multiverse Omnibus Vol. 1
23	What If... The All-New All-Different X-Men Had Never Existed? Collected in Giant-Size X-Men 40th Anniversary		Collected in What If? Into the Multiverse Omnibus Vol. 1
24	What If... Wolverine Had Become The Lord of the Vampires?		Collected in What If? Into the Multiverse Omnibus Vol. 1
25	What If... Set Had Come to Earth?	What If? The Punisher were a Herald of Galactus? What If? The Human Torch and Iceman were Partners?	Collected in What If? Into the Multiverse Omnibus Vol. 1
26	What If... The Punisher Killed Daredevil?		Collected in What If? Into the Multiverse Omnibus Vol. 1
27	What If... The Sub-Mariner Had Joined The Fantastic Four?		Collected in What If? Into the Multiverse Omnibus Vol. 1
28	What If... Captain America Were Not the Only Super Soldier in World War II?		Collected in What If? Into the Multiverse Omnibus Vol. 1
29	What If... Captain America Had Formed the Avengers?		Collected in What If? Into the Multiverse Omnibus Vol. 1
30	What If... The Invisible Woman Had Her Second Child?		Collected in What If? Into the Multiverse Omnibus Vol. 1
31	What If... Spider-Man Had Not Lost His Cosmic Powers?		Collected in What If? Into the Multiverse Omnibus Vol. 1
32	What If... Phoenix Had Not Died?		Collected in What If? Into the Multiverse Omnibus Vol. 1
33	What If... Phoenix Rose Again?		Collected in What If? Into the Multiverse Omnibus Vol. 1
34	What If... No One Watched the Watcher? (humor special with 23 stories)		Collected in What If? Into the Multiverse Omnibus Vol. 1
35	What If... The Fantastic Five Fought Doctor Doom & Annihilus? (Timequake Part I)	What If... Lady Deathstrike got a hangnail?	Collected in What If? Into the Multiverse Omnibus Vol. 1
36	What If... The Cosmic Avengers and the Guardians of the Galaxy Had Been Defeated By Korvac? (Timequake Part II)		Collected in What If? Into the Multiverse Omnibus Vol. 1
37	What If... Wolverine and His X-Vampires Conquered the World? (Timequake Part III)		Collected in What If? Into the Multiverse Omnibus Vol. 1
38	What If... Thor Had Become a Thrall of Seth? (Timequake Part IV)		Collected in What If? Into the Multiverse Omnibus Vol. 1
39	What If... The Watcher Saved the Multiverse? (Timequake Part V)	What If? Magneto Was Stuck in an Elevator with Colossus, Iron Man and Doctor Doom??	Collected in What If? Into the Multiverse Omnibus Vol. 1
40	What If... Storm Stayed a Thief? Collected in X-Men: Alterniverse Visions		Collected in What If? Into the Multiverse Omnibus Vol. 2
41	What If... The Avengers Had Fought Galactus?	What If? The Fantastic Four Was Led By Keith Richards Instead of Reed Richards? What If? Wolverine Was the Worst There Was At What He Does?	Collected in What If? Into the Multiverse Omnibus Vol. 2
42	What If... Spider-Man Had Kept His Six Arms?		Collected in What If? Into the Multiverse Omnibus Vol. 2
43	What If... Wolverine Had Married Mariko?		Collected in What If? Into the Multiverse Omnibus Vol. 2
44	What If... Venom Had Possessed the Punisher?		Collected in What If? Into the Multiverse Omnibus Vol. 2
45	What If... Barbara Ketch Became Ghost Rider?		Collected in What If? Into the Multiverse Omnibus Vol. 2
46	What if... Cable had Destroyed the X-Men?		Collected in What If? Into the Multiverse Omnibus Vol. 2
47	What If... Magneto Took Over The USA?		Collected in What If? Into the Multiverse Omnibus Vol. 2
48	What If... Daredevil Saved Nuke?		Collected in What If? Into the Multiverse Omnibus Vol. 2
49	What If... Silver Surfer Possessed the Infinity Gauntlet?		Collected in What If? Into the Multiverse Omnibus Vol. 2
50	What If... The Hulk Killed Wolverine?		Collected in What If? Into the Multiverse Omnibus Vol. 2
51	What If... The Punisher became Captain America?		Collected in What If? Into the Multiverse Omnibus Vol. 2
52	What If... Doctor Doom Became Sorcerer Supreme?		Collected in What If? Into the Multiverse Omnibus Vol. 2
53	What If... The Iron Man of 2020 Had Been Stranded in the Past? Collected in Iron Man 2020	What If... Rick Jones Remained the Hulk? What If... Spider-Man Killed the Lizard?	Collected in What If? Into the Multiverse Omnibus Vol. 2
54	What If... Minion Had Not Killed Death's Head? Collected in Death's Head: Freelance Peacekeeping Agent		Collected in What If? Into the Multiverse Omnibus Vol. 2
55	What If... The Avengers Lost Operation Galactic Storm? (Part 1) Collected in Avengers: Galactic Storm Vol. 2		Collected in What If? Into the Multiverse Omnibus Vol. 2
56	What If... The Avengers Lost Operation Galactic Storm? (Part 2)		Collected in What If? Into the Multiverse Omnibus Vol. 2
57	What If... The Punisher Became an Agent of S.H.I.E.L.D.?		Collected in What If? Into the Multiverse Omnibus Vol. 2
58	What If... The Punisher Had Killed Spider-Man?		Collected in What If? Into the Multiverse Omnibus Vol. 2
59	What If... Wolverine Led Alpha Flight? Collected in X-Men: Alterniverse Visions		Collected in What If? Into the Multiverse Omnibus Vol. 2
60	A What If... X-Men Wedding Album Collected in X-Men: The Wedding of Cyclops and Jean Grey Omnibus	What If Scott Summers and Jean Grey Had Married Earlier? What If Scott Summers and Jean Grey Had Never Fallen in Love at All? What If Phoenix Had Fallen for Wolverine?	Collected in What If? Into the Multiverse Omnibus Vol. 2
61	What If... Spider-Man's Parents Destroyed His Family?		Collected in What If? Into the Multiverse Omnibus Vol. 2
62	What If... Wolverine Battled Weapon X? Collected in X-Men: Alterniverse Visions		Collected in What If? Into the Multiverse Omnibus Vol. 2
63	What If... War Machine Had Not Destroyed the Living Laser?		Collected in What If? Into the Multiverse Omnibus Vol. 2
64	What If... Iron Man Went Public?		Collected in What If? Into the Multiverse Omnibus Vol. 2
65	What If... Archangel Fell From Grace?		Collected in What If? Into the Multiverse Omnibus Vol. 2
66	What If... Rogue Possessed the Power of Thor? Collected in X-Men: Alterniverse Visions		Collected in What If? Into the Multiverse Omnibus Vol. 2
67	What If... Captain America Were Revived Today? (Part 1)		Collected in What If? Into the Multiverse Omnibus Vol. 2
68	What If... Captain America Were Revived Today? (Part 2)		Collected in What If? Into the Multiverse Omnibus Vol. 2
69	What If... Stryfe Killed the X-Men? Collected in X-Men: Alterniverse Visions		Collected in What If? Into the Multiverse Omnibus Vol. 2
70	What If... The Silver Surfer Had Not Betrayed Galactus?		Collected in What If? Into the Multiverse Omnibus Vol. 2
71	What If... The Gamma Bomb Spawned A Thousand Hulks?		Collected in What If? Into the Multiverse Omnibus Vol. 2
72	What If... Spider-Man Became a Murderer?		Collected in What If? Into the Multiverse Omnibus Vol. 2
73	What if... The Kingpin Owned Daredevil?		Collected in What If? Into the Multiverse Omnibus Vol. 2
74	What If... Mr. Sinister Formed the X-Men?		Collected in What If? Into the Multiverse Omnibus Vol. 2
75	What If... Blink of Generation X Had Not Died?		Collected in What If? Into the Multiverse Omnibus Vol. 2
76	What If... Peter Parker Had to Destroy Spider-Man?		Collected in What If? Into the Multiverse Omnibus Vol. 3
77	What If... Legion Killed Magneto? Collected in X-Men: Age Of Apocalypse Companion Omnibus		Collected in What If? Into the Multiverse Omnibus Vol. 3
78	What If... The New Fantastic Four Had Remained A Team?		Collected in What If? Into the Multiverse Omnibus Vol. 3
79	What If... Storm Had the Power of Phoenix?		Collected in What If? Into the Multiverse Omnibus Vol. 3
80	What If... The Hulk Had Evolved Into the Maestro?		Collected in What If? Into the Multiverse Omnibus Vol. 3
81	What If... The Age of Apocalypse Had Not Ended? Collected in X-Men: Age Of Apocalypse Companion Omnibus		Collected in What If? Into the Multiverse Omnibus Vol. 3
82	What If... J. Jonah Jameson Adopted Spider-Man?		Collected in What If? Into the Multiverse Omnibus Vol. 3
83	What If... Daredevil Was The Disciple Of Doctor Strange?		Collected in What If? Into the Multiverse Omnibus Vol. 3
84	What If... Shard Had Lived Instead of Bishop?		Not collected due to involvement of writer Gerard Jones, who has been convicted on child pornography charges
85	What If... Magneto Ruled All Mutants?		Collected in What If? Into the Multiverse Omnibus Vol. 3
86	What If... Scarlet Spider Had Killed Spider-Man?		Collected in What If? Into the Multiverse Omnibus Vol. 3
87	What If... Starring Sabretooth: Cat and Mouse		Collected in What If? Into the Multiverse Omnibus Vol. 3
88	What If... Starring Spider-Man: Arachnamorphosis		Collected in What If? Into the Multiverse Omnibus Vol. 3
89	What If... Starring Fantastic Four: The Fantastic Farce		Collected in What If? Into the Multiverse Omnibus Vol. 3
90	What If... Starring Cyclops And Havok: In The Shadows		Collected in What If? Into the Multiverse Omnibus Vol. 3
91	What If... Starring Hulk: The Man, The Monster		Collected in What If? Into the Multiverse Omnibus Vol. 3
92	What If... Starring Cannonball's Little Brother Josh and His Pet Sentinel		Collected in What If? Into the Multiverse Omnibus Vol. 3
93	What If... Starring Wolverine: A Man No More		Collected in What If? Into the Multiverse Omnibus Vol. 3
94	What If... Starring The Juggernaut: Kingdom Of Cain		Collected in What If? Into the Multiverse Omnibus Vol. 3
95	What If... Starring Ghost Rider: Broken Soul		Collected in What If? Into the Multiverse Omnibus Vol. 3
96	What If... Starring Quicksilver: The Quick and the Dead		Collected in What If? Into the Multiverse Omnibus Vol. 3
97	What If... Starring Black Knight: Last Light		Collected in What If? Into the Multiverse Omnibus Vol. 3
98	What If... Starring Rogue: Children In The Attic		Collected in What If? Into the Multiverse Omnibus Vol. 3
-1	What If... Starring Bishop: The Traitor		Collected in What If? Into the Multiverse Omnibus Vol. 3
99	What If... Starring Spider-Man: The Men Behind The Mask		Collected in What If? Into the Multiverse Omnibus Vol. 3
100	What If... Starring Gambit: Paper Skin	There's No Place Like That Place Where You Sleep and Keep Your Stuff What If... Starring Xavier's Sales Executives What If... Starring Wolver-Wimp What If... Starring Sheep-Boy Sabretooth and Wolverine Were Best Friends	Collected in What If? Into the Multiverse Omnibus Vol. 3
101	What If... Starring Archangel: Angel of Death	What If Gambit was a Street Card Hustler	Collected in What If? Into the Multiverse Omnibus Vol. 3
102	What If... Daredevil's Dad Had Thrown The Big Fight?		Collected in What If? Into the Multiverse Omnibus Vol. 3
103	What If... Starring Captain America: The Unknown Soldier		Collected in What If? Into the Multiverse Omnibus Vol. 3
104	What If... Starring Silver Surfer: Finders Keepers		Collected in What If? Into the Multiverse Omnibus Vol. 3
105	What If... Starring Spider-Man: Legacy... In Black and White Collected in Spider-Girl: The Complete Collection Vol. 1		Collected in What If? Into the Multiverse Omnibus Vol. 3
106	What If... Starring Gambit: Revenge! Retribution!		Collected in What If? Into the Multiverse Omnibus Vol. 3
107	What If... Starring Thor: If This Age Be Golden		Collected in What If? Into the Multiverse Omnibus Vol. 3
108	What If... Starring The Avengers: The Greatest Sacrifice! Collected in Carnage Epic Collection Vol 3: The Monster Inside		Collected in What If? Into the Multiverse Omnibus Vol. 3
109	What If... Starring Fantastic Four: Tragedy In A Tiny Town	What If... Rogue was Ugly?	Collected in What If? Into the Multiverse Omnibus Vol. 3
110	What If... Starring The Uncanny X-Men: Family Ties	What If... Doctor Doom Successfully Took Over the World?	Collected in What If? Into the Multiverse Omnibus Vol. 3
111	What If... Starring Wolverine: Horseman of War		Collected in What If? Into the Multiverse Omnibus Vol. 3
112	What If... Starring Ka-Zar: New York...The New Savage Land...No Escape!		Collected in What If? Into the Multiverse Omnibus Vol. 3
113	What If... Starring: Iron Man: Strange Allies		Collected in What If? Into the Multiverse Omnibus Vol. 3
114	What If... Starring: Secret Wars—25 Years Later Collected in Secret Wars Omnibus		Collected in What If? Into the Multiverse Omnibus Vol. 3

=== Volume 3 ===
In February 2005, Marvel published a further six issues of What If. They were all in the "one-shot" format. The editor, Justin Gabrie, attributed the publication of volume 3 to a suggestion from C. B. Cebulski.

Marvel published a single parody edition called Wha...Huh?!? in August 2005.

- What If Jessica Jones Had Joined The Avengers? (Also collected in Jessica Jones: Avenger, and Jessica Jones: Alias Omnibus)
- What If Karen Page Had Lived? (Also collected in Daredevil by Brian Michael Bendis & Alex Maleev Vol. 2)
- What If Aunt May Had Died Instead Of Uncle Ben?
- What If Dr. Doom Had Become The Thing?
- What If Magneto Had Formed The X-Men With Professor X?
- What If General Ross Had Become The Hulk? (Also collected in Incredible Hulk by Peter David Vol. 5)

=== Volume 4 ===
In February 2006, publication of volume 4 began. Again, there were six issues in the "one-shot" format. However, rather than follow What if tradition of using a divergence from a specific plot point, Volume 4 more closely resembled the DC Comics equivalent, Elseworlds, which presents stories that are continuities based on alternate versions (in time or place) of canon (for example, Superman: Red Son is a story in which Superman was raised in the Soviet Union instead of the United States) all but one of the volume 4 issues uses this format, explained by Uatu the Watcher having discovered historical documents from an alternative dimension. From the Japanese feudal era, the divergence of a shared alternate universe, Earth-717, begins. This divergence is the time when a Daredevil hero known as "the Devil Who Dares" appears. It is also the realm where characters are given alternative life histories and where they proceed in alternative historical periods.

Examples from volume 4 include Captain America battling the "White Skull" during the American Civil War; Wolverine taking on the role of the Punisher and fighting mobsters in 1920s Prohibition-era Chicago; Namor the Sub-Mariner being raised by his father on the surface during World War II; Thor becoming a herald of Galactus; and a Soviet version of the Fantastic Four, known as the "Ultimate Federalist Freedom Fighters" (consisting of Rudion Richards, Colossus, Magik and the Widow Maker), during the Cold War.

- What If...Captain America fought in the Civil War?
- What If...the Fantastic Four were Cosmonauts?
- What If...Daredevil lived in feudal Japan?
- What If...Namor grew up on land?
- What If...Thor was a herald of Galactus?
- What If...Wolverine was Public Enemy No. 1 in mob-ridden 1920s Chicago? (Also collected in Wolverine by Daniel Way Complete Collection Vol 2)

=== Volume 5 ===
In 2006, Marvel published another set of What If? issues, including one based on the Spider-Man story "The Other".

- What If? Avengers Disassembled #1: "Witchhunt: What if the Scarlet Witch hadn't acted alone?"
- What If? Spider-Man The Other #1: "What if Spider-Man had rejected the Spider? Poison Selves"
- What If? Wolverine Enemy of the State #1: "What if Wolverine was never Deprogrammed? Bite the Hand that Feeds"
- What If? X-Men Age of Apocalypse #1: ...What If Legion Had Killed Xavier and Magneto?" (Also collected in X-Men: Age of Apocalypse Companion)
- What If? X-Men Deadly Genesis #1: "What If Xavier's Secret Second Team Had Survived?"

=== Volume 6 ===
Volume 6 consists of five issues (2007–2008). A sixth, "What If: This Was the Fantastic Four", featuring Spider-Man, Wolverine, Ghost Rider and Hulk, was to be released in November 2007, but it was withheld due to the death of Mike Wieringo. What If: This Was the Fantastic Four was released as a tribute to Wieringo in June 2008 as a 48-page special. All its proceeds went to the Hero Initiative.

The other issues were:

- What If?: Planet Hulk (October 2007) (Also collected in Hulk: Planet Hulk Omnibus)
- What If?: Annihilation (November 2007)
- What If?: Civil War (December 2007)
- What If? X-Men: Rise and Fall of the Shi'ar Empire (December 2007)
- What If? Spider-Man vs. Wolverine (January 2008)

These issues were collected into a trade paperback, What If...? Civil War.

=== Volume 7 ===
In December 2008, Marvel published five What If specials which appeared weekly. They included: Fallen Son: The Death of Captain America, House of M, Spider-Man: Back in Black, and Secret Wars. A new "Fantastic Four" consisted of the Hulk, Spider-Man, Iron Man, and Wolverine. In addition, a story line featuring the Runaways as the Young Avengers ran throughout Volume 7.

- What If? House of M #1: "What If...Scarlet Witch Ended the 'House of M' By Saying, 'No More Power?'" (February 2009) (Also collected in House of M Companion Omnibus)
- What If? Fallen Son #1: "What If...Iron Man Had Died?" (February 2009)
- What If? Newer Fantastic Four #1: "What If...Newer Fantastic Four?" (February 2009)
- What If? Spider-Man Back in Black #1: "What If...Mary Jane Had Been Shot Instead of Aunt May?" (February 2009)
- What If? Secret Wars #1: "What If Doctor Doom Kept the Beyonder's Power?" (February 2009)

=== Volume 8 ===
In December 2009, a new series was published. Volume 8 focused on three recent events in the Marvel Universe, including the Spider-Man: House of M miniseries and the "World War Hulk" and "Secret Invasion" story lines. There was also an edition focusing on the Astonishing X-Men series and a classic What If? about Daredevil and Elektra. With the exception of this last issue, each comic in Volume 8 featured two alternatives for the event.

- What If? Secret Invasion #1: "What if the Skrulls succeeded in their Secret Invasion?" (February 2010)
- What If? World War Hulk #1: "What If The Heroes Lost World War Hulk?" (February 2010)
- What If? Daredevil Vs. Elektra #1: "What If Daredevil Died Saving Elektra?" (February 2010)
- What If? Astonishing X-Men #1: "What If Ord Resurrected Jean Grey Instead of Colossus?": (February 2010)
- What If? Spider-Man: House of M #1: "What If... Gwen Stacy Survived The House of M?" (February 2010) (Also collected in House of M Companion Omnibus)

=== Volume 9 ===
In September 2010, Marvel announced a ninth series of five What If issues in the one-shot format, to be released in December 2010. The second to fifth issues of volume 9 were not numbered.

- What If? Iron Man: Demon in an Armor #1: "What If Tony Stark Had Become Doctor Doom?" (February 2011)
- What If? Wolverine: Father #1: "Wolverine: Father" (February 2011) (Also collected in Daken: Dark Wolverine Omnibus)
- What If? Spider-Man #1: "What If Spider-Man Killed Kraven the Hunter?" (February 2011)
- What If? Dark Reign #1 "What If Clint Barton Killed Norman Osborn?"(February 2011)
- Venom/Deadpool: What If? #1 "What If Venom Possessed Deadpool?"(April 2011) (Also collected in Deadpool Classic Vol 20: Ultimate Deadpool)

What If? #200 was an extra-sized edition featuring two stories. It presented an alternative for the Siege Marvel Universe event, asking what might have happened if the Sentry had not lost control and Norman Osborn had conquered Asgard. The second story examined "The Galactus Trilogy", and was written by Stan Lee, the author of the original.

=== Volume 10 ===
On March 22, 2013, Marvel's editor-in-chief Axel Alonso revealed to Comic Book Resources that What If...? was coming back with What If...? Avengers vs. X-Men, a four-issue limited series written by Jimmy Palmiotti and illustrated by Jorge Molina.

=== Volume 11 ===
In April 2014, Marvel released the five-issue series What If? Age of Ultron, which spun out of the 2013 event and examined the consequences of Wolverine going back in time to kill Hank Pym before he created Ultron. Each issue explored what a new universe would be like which arose from the removal of another core Avenger, with the Wasp in #1, Iron Man in #2, Thor in #3 and Captain America in #4. The series was concluded in #5 with a world where Hank Pym never created Ultron in the first place and thus, a universe without Ultron's creation of the Vision.

=== Volume 12 ===
In October 2015, Marvel released another five-part series of stories under the What If? banner, this time focused on the 2013 story line "Infinity", which saw the Avengers, the Guardians of the Galaxy, the Inhumans and other groups dealing with a combined threat of a universal incursion by the race the Builders, and an attack on Earth by Thanos and his forces. Each issue is a self-contained story, and the first four explore a different outcome to the event. The fifth, What If? Infinity: Dark Reign, presents a world in which Norman Osborn and the Dark Avengers had acquired the Infinity Gauntlet during the 2008 - 09 "Dark Reign" story line.

- What If? Infinity: Thanos
- What If? Infinity: Inhumans
- What If? Infinity: X-Men
- What If? Infinity: Guardians Of The Galaxy
- What If? Infinity: Dark Reign

=== Volume 13 ===
In October 2018, Marvel released six more one-shots under the What If? banner, as well as several $1.00 True Believer reprints of classic What If? issues.

- What If? Spider-Man Vol. 2 "What if Flash Thompson became Spider-Man" (2018)
- What If? X-Men Vol. 1 "What if the X-Men were .EXE/men?" (2018)
- What If? The Punisher Vol. 1 "What if Peter Parker became the Punisher?" (2018)
- What If? Ghost Rider Vol. 1 (2018) "What if Marvel Comics Went Metal with Ghost Rider?" (2018)
- What If? Thor Vol. 1 "What if Thor were raised by Frost Giants?" (2018)
- What If? Magik Vol. 1 "What if Magik became Sorcerer Supreme?" (2018)

=== Spider-Man: Spider's Shadow ===
In 2021, Marvel published a five-issue miniseries titled Spider-Man: Spider's Shadow, detailing what if Peter Parker fully accepted the alien symbiote and became Venom. While it did not have the title of What If?, it did have the branding on the cover.

=== What If...? Miles Morales ===
In 2022, Marvel published a five-issue miniseries exploring what would happen if Miles Morales had acquired the powers of different Marvel super-heroes. The first four issues saw him become Captain America, Wolverine, Hulk, and Thor, with the four divergent Miles meeting in the final issue. The issue "What If...? Miles Morales Became Thor" received criticism for racist dialogue and imagery from its white and Hispanic creative team.

=== What If...? Dark ===
In 2023, Marvel published six one-shots under the title What If... Dark?, which revisited iconic Marvel stories with a darker twist.

- What If...? Dark: Loki #1: "What if Loki wielded Mjolnir?" (July 2023)
- What If...? Dark: Spider-Gwen #1: "What if Gwen Stacy didn't die on the bridge that day, but Spider-Man did?" (July 2023)
- What If...? Dark: Venom #1: "What If Ben Grimm became Venom?" (August 2023)
- What If...? Dark: Moon Knight #1: "What if Moon Knight did not survive his battle with Bushman?" (August 2023)
- What If...? Dark: Carnage #1: "What if Cortland Kasady became Carnage?" (September 2023)
- What If...? Dark: Tomb of Dracula #1: "What if Dracula transformed Blade into a vampire?" (August 2023)

=== Aliens: What If...? ===
In 2024, Marvel announced that What If...? would move beyond solely the Marvel Universe to explore alternate takes on the continuities of other franchises owned by their parent company The Walt Disney Company, beginning with Aliens: What If...?, based on the Alien franchise, the first five-issue arc of which would explore the scenario "What If... Carter Burke had lived?", exploring what would happen if the character of Carter Burke had survived the events of the 1986 film Aliens, with the series to be written by the character's actor Paul Reiser, his son Leon Reiser, as well as Adam F. Goldberg, Brian Volk-Weiss, and Hans Rodionoff, with art by Guiu Vilanova.

=== What If...? Venom ===
In 2024, Marvel announced a five-issue miniseries exploring what would happen if the Venom symbiote had bonded with different Marvel super-heroes. Over the course of the run, the symbiote bonds with She-Hulk, Wolverine, Doctor Strange, Loki, and Moon Knight in a single continuity.

=== Marvel & Disney: What if...? ===
From July 2024 to July 2025, Marvel published a What If...? series exploring what would happen if classic Disney characters had acquired the powers of different Marvel super-heroes.

- What if...? Donald Duck Became Wolverine #1: "Old Duck Donald" (July 2024)
- What If...? Donald Duck Became Thor #1: (September 2024)
- What If...? Minnie Became Captain Marvel #1: "The Awesome Origin of Minnie Captain Marvel!" (November 2024)
- What If...? Mickey & Friends Became the Fantastic Four #1: (January 2024)
- What If...? Mickey & Friends Became the Avengers #1: (March 2025)
- What If...? Donald Duck Became Iron Man #1: (May 2025)
- What If...? Goofy Became Spider-Man #1: (July 2025)

=== Volume 20 ===
In the summer of 2026, Marvel will release eight new What If...? one-shots to celebrate the series' 50th anniversary.

- What If...? Uncanny X-Men #1: "What if Cyclops stayed with Madelyne Pryor?" (June 2026)
- What If...? Thor #1: "What if Thor got Spider-Man's Symbiote suit?" (June 2026)
- What If...? Secret Wars #1: "What if the Ultimate universe survived the Secret Wars?" (July 2026)
- What If...? Jessica Jones #1: "What if Jessica Jones was bitten by the radioactive spider?" (July 2026)
- What If...? Spider-Man #1: "What if Kraven survived his last hunt?" (July 2026)
- What If...? Captain America #1: "What if Captain America was revived in 2099?" (August 2026)
- What If...? Runways #1: "What if the Runaways hadn't run away?" (August 2026)
- What If...? X-Men #1: "What if Cassandra Nova killed Professor X?" (August 2026)

== Bibliography ==
=== Collected editions ===
Title	Material collected	Published date	ISBN
Volume 1
What If? Classic Vol. 1	What If? #1–6	January 2005	978-0785117025
What If? Classic Vol. 2	What If? #7–12	January 2006	978-0785118435
What If? Classic Vol. 3	What If? #14–15, 17–20	January 2007	978-0785120810
What If? Classic Vol. 4	What If? #21–26	December 2007	978-0785127383
What If? Classic Vol. 5	What If? #27–32	January 2009	978-0785130864
What If? Classic Vol. 6	What If? #33–38	December 2009	978-0785137535
What If? Classic Vol. 7	What If? #40–42, 44–47 and material from #43	February 2011	978-0785153115
What If? Classic: The Complete Collection Vol. 1	What If? #1-12	January 2019	978-1302916114
What If? Classic: The Complete Collection Vol. 2	What If? #13–15, 17–23	November 2019	978-1302920593
What If? Classic: The Complete Collection Vol. 3	What If? #24-35	February 2020	978-1302922740
What If? Classic: The Complete Collection Vol. 4	What If? #36-47	July 2020	978-1302922863
What If? The Original Marvel Series Omnibus Vol. 1	What If? #1-15, 17-22	August 2021	978-1302929930
What If? The Original Marvel Series Omnibus Vol. 2	What If? #23-47	February 2022	978-1302931339
Volume 2
What If? Into The Multiverse Omnibus Vol. 1	What If? Special #1, What If? (vol. 2) #1-39, Quasar #30	July 2023	978-1302946456
What If? Into The Multiverse Omnibus Vol. 2	What If? (vol. 2) #40-75	November 2024	978-1302953881
What If? Into The Multiverse Omnibus Vol. 3	What If? (vol. 2) #76-83, 85-114, -1	April 2026	978-1302965990
Subsequent Volumes
What If? Why Not?	What If Jessica Jones Had Joined The Avengers? #1, What If Karen Page Had Lived? #1, What If Aunt May Had Died Instead Of Uncle Ben? #1, What If Dr. Doom Had Become The Thing? #1, What If Magneto Had Formed The X-Men With Professor X? #1, What If General Ross Had Become The Hulk? #1	March 2005	978-0785115939
What If? Mirror Mirror	What If: Captain America #1, What If: Daredevil #1, What If: Fantastic Four #1, What If: Sub-Mariner #1, What If: Thor #1, What If: Wolverine #1	May 2006	978-0785119029
What If? Event Horizon	What If? Avengers Disassembled #1, What If? Spider-Man: The Other #1, What If? Wolverine: Enemy of the State #1, What If? X-Men: Age of Apocalypse #1, What If? X-Men: Deadly Genesis #1	June 2007	978-0785121831
What If? Civil War	What If? Annihilation #1, What If? Civil War #1, What If? Planet Hulk #1, What If? X-Men #1, What If? Spider-Man vs. Wolverine #1	April 2008	978-0785130369
What If? Secret Wars	What If? Captain America: Fallen Son #1, What If? Spider-Man: Back In Black #1, What If? Secret Wars #1, What If? WWH #1, What If? X-Men: House of M #1, What If? Newer Fantastic Four #1	April 2009	978-0785133414
What If? Secret Invasion	What If? Secret Invasion #1, What If? World War Hulk #1, What If? Spider-Man: House of M #1, What If? Daredevil vs. Electra #1, What If? Astonishing X-Men #1	May 2010	978-1804910559
What If? Dark Avengers	What If? #200, What If? Dark Reign #1, What If? Iron Man: Demon in an Armor #1, What If? Spider-Man #1, What If? Wolverine: Father #1	April 2011	978-0785152781
What If? Avengers vs. X-Men	What If? AVX #1-4	October 2013	978-0785183945
What If? Age of Ultron	What If? Age of Ultron #1-5	July 2014	978-0785190547
What If? Infinity	What If? Infinity - Thanos #1, What If? Infinity - Inhumans #1, What If? Infinity - X-Men #1, What If? Infinity - Guardians of the Galaxy #1, What If? Infinity - Dark Reign #1	September 2016	978-0785193142
What If? With Great Power	What If? Spider-Man #1, What If? X-Men #1, What If? the Punisher #1, What If? Ghost Rider #1, What If? Thor #1, What If? Magik #1	March 2019	978-1846533129
Spider-Man: Spider's Shadow	Spider-Man: Spider's Shadow #1-5	November 2021	978-1302920913
What If? Miles Morales	What If? Miles Morales #1-5	September 2022	978-1302946036

== In other media ==
What If serves as inspiration for media set in the Marvel Cinematic Universe (MCU):

- The fourth season of the TV series Agents of S.H.I.E.L.D. features a story arc loosely inspired by the What If series, with the first episode of it being named after the comic book series. Throughout the arc, Holden Radcliffe and his A.I. assistant Aida develop a virtual world called the Framework, which depicts the lives of several S.H.I.E.L.D. agents under drastically different circumstances.
- A self-titled animated series based on What If depicts the Watcher (voiced by Jeffrey Wright) observing events in the MCU multiverse occurring differently.

== See also ==
- Canon (fiction)
- Elseworlds
- Multiverse (Marvel Comics)
- Intercompany crossover
- What The--?!
- Not Brand Echh
