= Aliens: What If…? =

Aliens: What If… Carter Burke lived?, or simply Aliens: What If…? or What If…? Aliens, is a comic book series published by Marvel Comics as the fifteen volume of What If…?. Unlike the previous sixteen volumes, focused on characters of the Marvel Universe, this series is based on the Alien franchise character Carter Burke from the film Aliens, imagining Burke thirty years after surviving his death in the film.

In 2024, Marvel announced that What If...? would move beyond solely the Marvel Universe to explore alternate takes on the continuities of other franchises owned by their parent company The Walt Disney Company, beginning with the first five-issue arc of which exploring the scenario of Carter Burke surviving the events of the 1986 film Aliens, with the series to be written by the character's actor Paul Reiser, his son Leon Reiser, as well as Adam F. Goldberg, Brian Volk-Weiss, and Hans Rodionoff, with art by Guiu Vilanova.

The series received good reviews, though many questioned why the series needed to exist at all, calling Reiser's son's involvement in the book out as nepotism.
