= Paul Reiser =

American actor

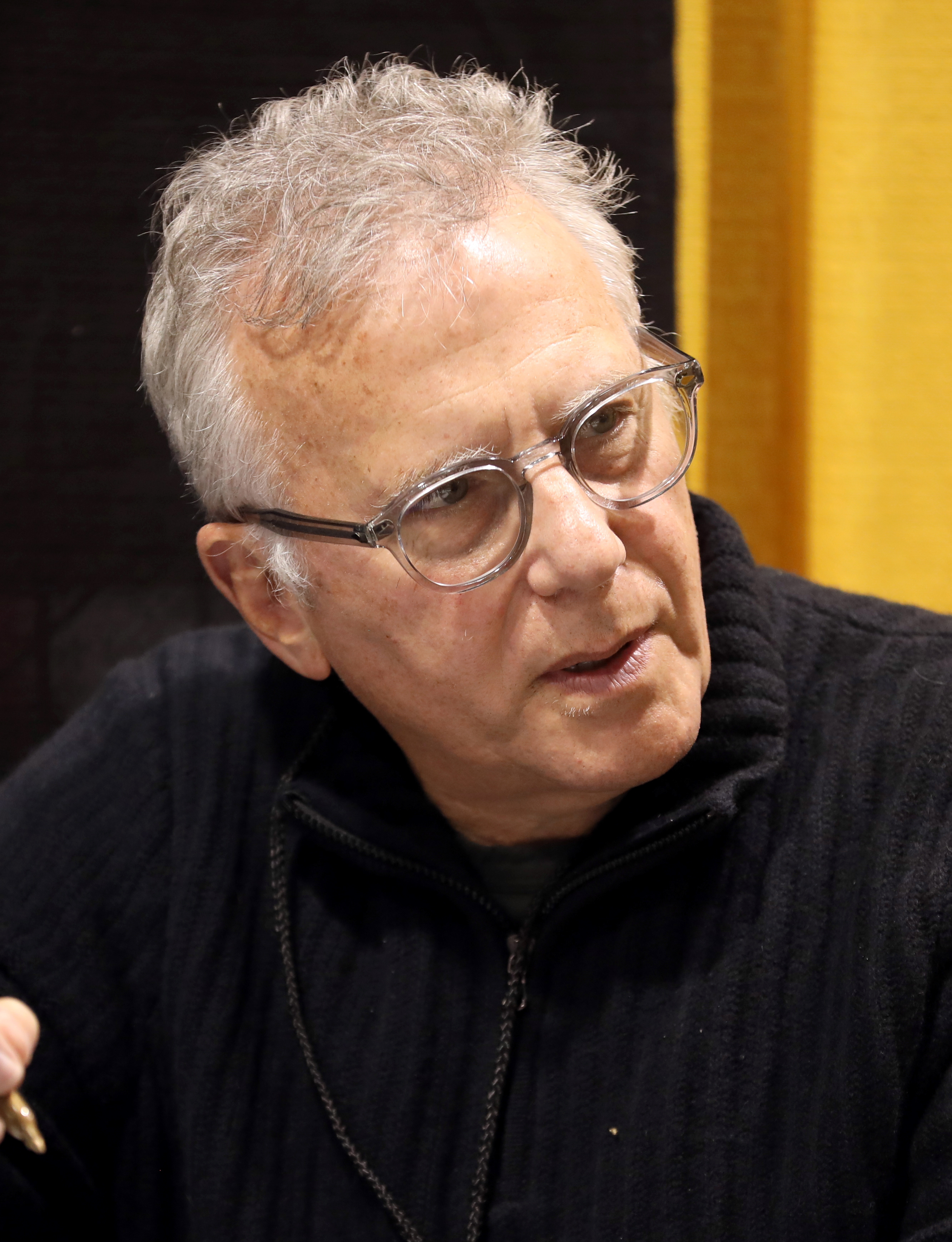
- Reiser at the 2024 WonderCon
- Born: March 30, 1956 (age 70); New York City, U.S.
- Education: Binghamton University
- Occupations: Actor; comedian; writer
- Years active: 1982–present
- Spouse: Paula Ravets (m. 1988)
- Children: 2
- Relatives: Will Reiser (cousin); Richard Epstein (cousin)
- Website: paulreiser.com

Paul Reiser (/ˈraɪzər/; born March 30, 1956) is an American actor, comedian, and writer. He played the roles of Michael Taylor in the 1980s sitcom My Two Dads, Paul Buchman in the NBC sitcom Mad About You (which he also co-created), Modell in the 1982 film Diner, and Detective Jeffrey Friedman in the Beverly Hills Cop franchise. He has gained recognition for his roles as Jim Neiman in the 2014 film Whiplash and Dr. Sam Owens in the Netflix series Stranger Things.

Reiser portrayed Carter Burke in James Cameron's Aliens (1986), and wrote Aliens: What If… Carter Burke Lived? (2024). He appeared in the second and third seasons of The Kominsky Method (2019–2021) as Martin, Mindy Kominsky's boyfriend.

Reiser has been ranked 77th on Comedy Central's 2004 list of the "100 Greatest Stand-ups of All Time". The name of his production company, Nuance Productions, is inspired by one of his lines in the film Diner, where his character explains his discomfort with the word "nuance".

== Early life ==
Reiser was born in New York City in 1956, the son of Helen Hollinger Reiser (1919–2012), a homemaker who was one of the first women to graduate from Baruch College; and Samuel H. Reiser (1914–1989), a wholesale health food distributor who served in the military. His family is of Romanian Jewish descent and he grew up in Stuyvesant Town-Peter Cooper Village. He has three sisters. He attended the East Side Hebrew Institute and graduated from Stuyvesant High School. He earned his bachelor's degree at the State University of New York at Binghamton, where he majored in music (piano, composition).

During his college years, Reiser was active in student theater productions at the Hinman Little Theater, an on-campus community theater organization in Hinman College, Reiser's dorm community. He found his calling as a comedian while performing in New York clubs during university summer breaks.

== Career ==
=== Acting ===
After developing his skills as a stand-up comedian, Reiser had a breakout film role in 1982 when he appeared in Diner, a coming-of-age film directed by Barry Levinson. Reiser's character, Modell, a closet stand-up comedian, effectively brought Reiser's abilities to the attention of Hollywood. He followed this success playing a detective in Beverly Hills Cop (1984), a role he reprised in its sequel Beverly Hills Cop II (1987), and again in Beverly Hills Cop: Axel F (2024). Reiser also appeared in James Cameron's Aliens (1986), in which he played the villainous Carter Burke; and in The Marrying Man (1991) and Bye Bye Love (1995).

Reiser starred as one of two possible fathers of a teenage girl in the TV sitcom My Two Dads (1987–90), and later came to prominence in North America as Paul Buchman in Mad About You (1992–99), a comedy series he co-created, in which Helen Hunt co-starred as his on-screen wife. He was also the co-composer of the show's theme song, "The Final Frontier" (with Don Was), and performed the piano for the theme's recording. Reiser's role in Mad About You earned him nominations for an Emmy, a Golden Globe, an American Comedy Award, and a Screen Actors Guild Award. For the show's final season, Reiser and Hunt received $1 million ($1.9 million today) per episode. After signing onto a Mad About You revival in 2018, it was picked up as a 12-episode limited series by Spectrum Originals in March 2019, which became available for members of Amazon Prime Video as of fall 2020.

In 2001, Reiser played a dramatic role as a man desperate to locate his biological mother, after learning he has a serious illness, in the British TV film My Beautiful Son. In 2002, Reiser made a guest appearance as himself on Larry David's HBO sitcom, Curb Your Enthusiasm. In the TV comedy film Atlanta (2007), Reiser appears as one half of a couple who, after meeting at a funeral, are unable to stay away from each other. In 2010, Reiser collaborated with the singer Julia Fordham to create a CD album titled Unusual Suspects, which includes the song "UnSung Hero", dedicated to American soldiers serving in Afghanistan. The two embarked on an acoustic tour after its release. Reiser also co-wrote the song, "No There There" with Melissa Manchester for her 2015 album, You Gotta Love the Life. Early in his career, Reiser was the opening act for Manchester, who warned him that music audiences can be rough on comedians and that the last comedian that opened for her left the stage in tears. Reiser reflects about this warning and on how he then bombed at the Concord Hotel in the chapter "Don't Worry if They Suck" in I Killed: True Stories of the Road from America's Top Comics (2010), by Ritch Shydner and Mark Schiff.

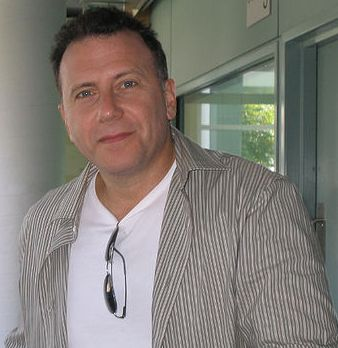
Reiser in 2005

Reiser scripted and starred in the semi-autobiographical comedy series The Paul Reiser Show, which aired on NBC as a mid-season replacement during the 2010–11 TV season. "This is nice", commented Reiser on the Stephanie Miller radio program, "because you get to sit around and root for other shows to fail." However, due to the lack of lead time and promotion by NBC prior to its debut (as well as poor scheduling), the low-rated show was canceled on April 22, 2011, with only two episodes aired. He co-created (but did not star in) the 2017 dramedy There's... Johnny!, set backstage at The Tonight Show Starring Johnny Carson in 1972. Originally created for Seeso, the seven-episode season was released on Hulu after Seeso's collapse. In recent years Reiser has appeared in films such as Whiplash and TV series such as Red Oaks and Stranger Things. In 2022, Reiser appeared in the third season of The Boys as The Legend, and reprised his role in the fifth season.

=== Writing ===
Reiser has written three books: Couplehood (1995), about the ups and downs of being in a committed relationship; Babyhood (1997), about his experiences as a first-time father, and Familyhood (2011), a collection of humorous essays. Couplehood is unique in that it starts on page 145; Reiser explained this as his method of giving the reader a false sense of accomplishment. In 1996, Reiser appeared on Late Show with David Letterman in the middle of writing Babyhood. Since he had not yet decided on a title, he presented a prop book, titled simply "Book" and with the same cover as that of Couplehood. The term olive theory was first coined in Couplehood.

He also co-wrote Michael McDonald's memoir What a Fool Believes. They discuss how the book came about and McDonald's career on the first episode of season one of Recorded Live at Analog.

In 2024, Reiser revisited his Aliens character for a new Marvel comic titled Aliens: What If…? which explores what could have happened if Carter Burke survived the events of Hadley's Hope. The book was co-written by his son, Leon Reiser, with art by Guiu Vilanova. Reiser also lended his likeness to the illustrated Burke in the comic.

== Personal life ==
Reiser married Paula Ravets on August 21, 1988. They have two sons, born in 1995 and 2000. His older son has cerebral palsy, which Reiser has spoken about publicly at fundraisers and other events.

Reiser is the cousin of screenwriter and producer Will Reiser, who wrote the semi-autobiographical comedy-drama film 50/50 (2011).

Reiser's first cousin is the legal scholar Richard Epstein.

== Filmography ==
=== Film ===
| Year | Title | Role | Notes |
|---|---|---|---|
| 1982 | Diner | Modell | |
| 1984 | Beverly Hills Cop | Det. Jeffrey Friedman | |
| 1986 | Odd Jobs | Max | |
| 1986 | Aliens | Carter Burke | |
| 1987 | Beverly Hills Cop II | Det. Jeffrey Friedman | |
| 1987 | Cross My Heart | Bruce Gaynor | |
| 1990 | Crazy People | Stephen Bachman | |
| 1991 | The Marrying Man | Phil Golden | |
| 1993 | Family Prayers | Dan Linder | |
| 1994 | Mr. Write | Charlie Fisher | |
| 1995 | Bye Bye Love | Donny | |
| 1999 | Get Bruce | Himself | |
| 1999 | The Story of Us | Dave | Uncredited |
| 1999 | Pros & Cons | Prison Man #1 | Uncredited |
| 2001 | One Night at McCool's | Carl | |
| 2001 | Purpose | Ben Fisher | |
| 2005 | The Thing About My Folks | Ben Kleinman | Also writer and producer |
| 2005 | The Aristocrats | Himself | |
| 2009 | Funny People | Himself | |
| 2014 | Whiplash | Jim Neiman | |
| 2014 | Life After Beth | Noah Orfman | |
| 2015 | Concussion | Dr. Elliot Pellman | |
| 2016 | Joshy | Steve | |
| 2016 | Miles | Lloyd Bryant | |
| 2016 | War on Everyone | Lt. Gerry Stanton | |
| 2016 | The Book of Love | Wendell | |
| 2016 | The Darkness | Simon Richards | |
| 2017 | The Little Hours | Ilario | |
| 2017 | I Do... Until I Don't | Harvey Burger | |
| 2018 | The Spy Who Dumped Me | Arnie Freeman | |
| 2020 | Horse Girl | Gary | |
| 2021 | Fatherhood | Howard | |
| 2021 | Scenes From An Empty Church | The Dad | |
| 2023 | The Problem with People | Barry | Also co-writer |
| 2024 | The Gutter | Angelo | |
| 2024 | Beverly Hills Cop: Axel F | Deputy Chief Jeffrey Friedman | |

=== Television ===
| Year | Title | Role | Notes |
|---|---|---|---|
| 1982 | Remington Steele | Ivan Turbell | Episode: "A Good Night's Steele" |
| 1983 | Sunset Limousine | Jay Neilson | Television film |
| 1987 | The Disney Sunday Movie | Dexter Bunche | Episode: "You Ruined My Life" |
| 1987–1990 | My Two Dads | Michael Taylor | 60 episodes |
| 1987 | Paul Reiser: Out on a Whim | Himself | Stand-up special |
| 1991 | Paul Reiser: 3½ Blocks from Home | Himself | Stand-up special |
| 1992–1999, 2019 | Mad About You | Paul Buchman | 174 episodes; also creator, writer, and executive producer Viewers for Quality Television Award for Best Actor in a Quality Comedy Series; Nominated—American Comedy Award for Funniest Male Performer in a Television Series; Nominated—Golden Globe Award for Best Actor – Television Series Musical or Comedy (1995–98); Nominated—Primetime Emmy Award for Outstanding Comedy Series (1994–97); Nominated—Primetime Emmy Award for Outstanding Lead Actor in a Comedy Series (1994–99); Nominated—Satellite Award for Best Actor – Television Series Musical or Comedy; Nominated—Screen Actors Guild Award for Outstanding Performance by a Male Actor in a Comedy Series (1995–96); Nominated—Screen Actors Guild Award for Outstanding Performance by an Ensemble in a Comedy Series (1995–98); Nominated—Viewers for Quality Television Award for Best Actor in a Quality Comedy Series |
| 1993 | The Tower | Tony Minot | Television movie |
| 1995 | 37th Annual Grammy Awards | Himself (host) | TV special |
| 1995 | Saturday Night Live | Himself (host) | Episode: "Paul Reiser/Annie Lennox" |
| 2001 | My Beautiful Son | Jerry Lipman | Television movie; AKA Strange Relations |
| 2002 | Curb Your Enthusiasm | Paul Reiser | Episode: "The Terrorist Attack" |
| 2002 | Women vs. Men | Bruce | Television movie |
| 2011 | The Paul Reiser Show | Paul Reiser | 7 episodes; also creator, writer, and executive producer |
| 2013 | Behind the Candelabra | Mr. Felder | Television movie |
| 2014–2016 | TripTank | Gary (voice) | 10 episodes |
| 2014–2015 | Married | Shep | 10 episodes |
| 2014–2017 | Red Oaks | Doug Getty | Main role |
| 2017–2022 | Stranger Things | Dr. Sam Owens | 14 episodes Nominated—Screen Actors Guild Award for Outstanding Performance by an Ensemble in a Drama Series |
| 2018 | The Romanoffs | Bob Isaacson | Episode: "House of Special Purpose" |
| 2019 | Fosse/Verdon | Cy Feuer | 2 episodes |
| 2019–2021 | The Kominsky Method | Martin Schneider | 12 episodes Nominated—Primetime Emmy Award for Outstanding Supporting Actor in a Comedy Series; Nominated—Screen Actors Guild Award for Outstanding Performance by an Ensemble in a Comedy Series (2020, 2022) |
| 2022, 2026 | The Boys | The Legend | 3 episodes |
| 2022 | Reboot | Gordon Gelman | Main cast |
| 2025–present | Long Story Short | Elliot Cooper (voice) | Main cast |
| 2026 | The Altruists | Joe Bankman | Upcoming series |

== Bibliography ==
- Couplehood (1995)
- Babyhood (1997)
- Familyhood (2011)
- What a Fool Believes: A Memoir (2024) with Michael McDonald
- Aliens: What If… Carter Burke Lived? (2024) with Leon Reiser, Adam F. Goldberg, Brian Volk-Weiss, Hans Rodionoff, and Guiu Vilanova
