= List of Hulk supporting characters =

This is a list of Hulk supporting characters.

== Family ==
Hulk family

Robert Bruce Banner I
Karen Lee Ross	Gen. Thaddeus E. "Thunderbolt" Ross; Red Hulk	Rebecca Banner	Brian Banner; Guilt Hulk	Susan Banner-Drake	Elaine Banner-Walters	Morris Walters
Brian Talbot	Glenn Talbot	Elizabeth "Betty" Ross; Harpy / Red She-Hulk	Dr. Robert Bruce Banner; Incredible Hulk; Joe Fixit; Maestro; Immortal Hulk	Caiera	Jarella	Jennifer Susan "Jen" Walters; Savage She-Hulk (Note: Previously married to John Jonah Jameson III before the pair divorced.)
Matt Talbot	Helen Cho	Phil Cho	Hiro-Kala; World-Breaker (Note: Posthumously born after a breached Illuminati warp core killed Caiera in a nuclear explosion.)	Skaar	Thundra
Monica Rappaccini; Scientist Supreme	Madame Curie "Maddy" Cho	Amadeus Cho; Totally Awesome Hulk; World-Breaker / Brawn	Timothy "Tim" Black	Julia Black	Lyra Walters; Savage She-Hulk
Lorcan Rappaccini	Carmilla Black (née Thasanee Rappaccini); The Scorpion	She-Clone (Note: Clones of She-Hulk created by the Headmen and the Master of the World.)	Amazon

=== Parents ===
- Brian Banner – Brian Banner is the son of Bruce Banner I, the brother of Elaine and Susan Banner, the husband of Rebecca Banner, the father of Bruce Banner, and the uncle of Jennifer Walters. Abusive to Bruce and Rebecca, he murdered her in front of him. He was killed by Bruce in a self-defense accident but returned as a vengeful ghost.
- Rebecca Banner – Bruce Banner's mother who helped raise and protect him from his abusive father Brian Banner. She was eventually killed by Brian in front of Bruce.

=== Wife and children ===
- Betty Ross – The daughter of Thunderbolt Ross and Bruce Banner's most enduring love interest, later his wife. Deceased due to poisoning by the Abomination, later revealed to be cryogenically preserved and transformed by the Leader and MODOK into Red She-Hulk.
- Skaar – The first son of the Hulk and Caiera. Their first encounter was hostile since Skaar felt Hulk had deserted him on Sakaar, when Hulk was avenging his planet and family during World War Hulk.
- Hiro-Kala – He is the younger son of the Hulk and Caiera and the twin brother of Skaar.
- Lyra – Daughter of the Hulk and Thundra. Lyra was raised in the 23rd century by Femizons, battling men. She was conceived artificially by Thundra stealing Hulk's DNA during a fight, the time-displaced Lyra now lives with her aunt, Jennifer.
- Scorpion – Carmilla Black, born Thasanee Rappaccini, is the daughter of Scientist Supreme of the worldwide terrorist network Advanced Idea Mechanics, Monica Rappaccini. Peter David implied that Bruce Banner may be her biological father, which was further alluded to in Hulk Family #1 (February 2009).

=== Extended family ===
- She-Hulk – Jennifer Walters is the daughter of Morris Walters and Elaine Banner-Walters, and the cousin of Bruce Banner. When she was critically wounded, Bruce gave her an emergency blood transfusion that transformed her into the heroic She-Hulk.
- Elaine Banner-Walters – Elaine Banner is the sister of Brian Banner, Bruce Banner's aunt, Morris Walters's wife, and the mother of Jennifer Walters. Since her husband was the Sheriff of the Los Angeles Police Force, he became a threat to Nicholas Trask. Trask wanted Morris killed and planned out a murder by smashing into him in his car and make it look like a drunk-driving crash, but his plan back-fired because Elaine had been the one driving to see Jennifer's dance recital with two of her friends. Deceased.
- Susan Drake-Banner – Susan Banner is the sister of Brian Banner, and Bruce Banner and Jennifer Walter's aunt. After Rebecca's death at the hands of her brother, Bruce was placed into her care.

== Allies ==
- Angela Lipscombe – An old romantic flame from Bruce Banner's college days. Many years later, she would have a brief relationship with Doc Samson. Lipscombe studied neuro-psychiatry in graduate school and holds a doctorate in applied medical research. She deduced that Banner's merged persona was actually another alternate personality. First appearance The Incredible Hulk vol. 3 #12 (2000).
- Amadeus Cho – The seventh smartest person on Earth. After being tragically orphaned, Cho was saved by and quickly befriended the Hulk. He later becomes a version of the Hulk dubbed the Totally Awesome Hulk after absorbing Hulk's energy to stop a nuclear meltdown.
- April Sommers – Bruce's New York landlady when he embarked on a bright new chapter in his life. She was presented as a possible romantic interest, but the shadow of the Hulk once again got in the way of his happiness. First appearance The Incredible Hulk vol. 2 #208 (1977).
- Avengers – The Hulk very briefly was a founding member of the original team. His unstable personality made it impossible for him to remain a member. He fared somewhat better years later in the Defenders.
- Bereet – An alien artist and filmmaker from the planet Krylor, and brief love interest of Bruce Banner, with technology enabling her to turn her movies into reality.
- Cary St. Lawrence – Originally an army colonel pursuing the Hulk, but eventually came to understand and sympathise with him.
- Charlene McGowan – The transgender head scientist of Shadow Base.
- Charlie Tidwell – A young teenage girl who becomes Hulk's sidekick.
- Crackajack Jackson – A friendly wanderer, and the father of Hammer. Deceased.
- Defenders – A super-hero group of "non-joiners", including the Hulk, the Sub-Mariner, Doctor Strange, the Silver Surfer, Nighthawk, Valkyrie, Hellcat and others.
- Doc Samson – The Hulk's occasional psychiatrist. An ethical gamma-powered strongman with a working knowledge of nuclear biology, and excellent, quick-thinking, fighting skills.
- Doctor Strange – The greatest sorcerer on Earth, and leader of the Defenders. He had an almost fatherly relationship with the rampaging Hulk, and sometimes let the latter live in his mansion. The two have had a falling out following the Illuminati's launching of the Hulk into space.
- Falcon – Sam Wilson. He has defended the Hulk on a few occasions due to the Hulk's comforting his nephew Jim Wilson, during his last moments alive, and financing a medical fund to honour the latter's memory.
- Hercules – An Olympian God who's fought with the Hulk on many occasions. After an incident where Hercules and his Champions attempted to stop the Hulk from what they thought was another one of his rampages (but was actually him trying to bring his cousin to the hospital), Hercules vowed to make reparations. They've become allies since then and consider each other friends.
- Fred Sloan – A long-haired musician who befriended the Hulk years ago. First appearance The Incredible Hulk vol. 2 #231 (1979) He interviewed several people regarding The Hulk and eventually published a book Hulk Encounter: A Survivor's Story that was very sympathetic to the jade giant.
- Glorian – The reality-warping apprentice of the Shaper of Worlds, who has encountered the Hulk on multiple locations.
- Jackie McGee – Jacqueline "Jackie" McGee is a reporter from the Arizona Herald who was working on a story on the reappearing Hulk.
- Janis Jones
- Jarella – The queen of the planet K'ai and beloved of both the Hulk and Bruce Banner. Deceased due to saving a child from a falling building. She was the Hulk's first true warrior queen consort and wife predating Caiera of Sakaar by many years. She was killed in The Incredible Hulk vol. 2 #205 (1976)
- Jim Wilson – A friend of Bruce Banner and sometimes sidekick. He was the first character in mainstream comics to be HIV positive, and later died from AIDS.
- Kate Waynesboro – Bruce Banner's lab assistant and love interest, revealed as an agent and spy for S.H.I.E.L.D., but genuine in her affection, and remaining a friend afterwards. She has appeared in World War Hulk Aftersmash: Warbound.
- Kropotkin the Great - A crackpot charlatan ex-magician who once rented from landlady April Sommers when Banner rented his abandoned room. First appearance The Incredible Hulk vol. 2 #214 (1977).
- Marlo Chandler – Former girlfriend of Mr. Fixit later wife of Rick Jones.
- Mogol – An android constructed by Tyrannus to befriend the Hulk and enlist him as an ally, but unaware of his programming or artificial nature. Destroyed when Hulk found out and mistakenly thought that Mogol had intentionally betrayed him.
- Nadia Dornova
- Outcasts – Creatures who were mutated by the gamma blast that created the Hulk.
- Queen Divine Justice – The street-smart queen of the Jabari tribe of Wakanda, and former bodyguard/ceremonial betrothed of the Black Panther.
- Renegades – A ragtag group consisting of Amadeus Cho, Hercules, Namora, Angel, and Scorpion.
- Rick Jones – A teenager whom Banner saved from a gamma explosion, causing him to become the Hulk. He has been a sidekick or partner to the Avengers, Captain America and Captain Marvel.
- Rocket Raccoon
- Sandra Verdugo
- Sentry – Sentry is capable of pacifying the Hulk via empathy or a form of radiation, greatly reducing his rage-fueled power in the process. Hulk even served as his partner for a short time.
- Silver Surfer – A godlike cosmic wanderer of great compassion and spirituality. A fellow loner, recurrent ally and occasional confidant.
- Susan Jacobson – Susan Jacobson was a romantic interest for Bruce Banner while he was attending Desert State University in Navapo, New Mexico. The Incredible Hulk vol. 2 #226 (1978) Many years after college, she was recruited as a central intelligence agent.
- Thor – The Norse god of thunder. Former adversaries who put an end to their rivalry after teaming up to defeat the Red Hulk. They shook hands and even parted ways calling each other "friend".
- Valkyrie – The greatest among Asgardian warrior-women, and a fellow Defender, who comforted the Hulk after Jarella's death.
- Warbound from Planet Hulk
  - Caiera – The Hulk's warrior queen, with an "oldstrong" heritage, granting her the ability to turn harder than stone and attain immense levels of physical strength. She died in the explosion that destroyed Sakaar.
  - Elloe Kaifi – Daughter of a high ranking Sakaaran official whom the Red King tries for treason.
  - Hiroim – A warrior-mystic "Shadow Priest" who was expelled from his order for the heresy of believing he could be the Sakaarson, the fabled savior of planet Sakaar. He inherited Caiera's mystic Oldstrong power after all other members of his race perished.
  - Korg – A stone man of the Kronan race with great superhuman strength, who once fought Thor.
  - Miek – A meek insectoid who becomes king of his freed people before metamorphosing into a behemoth. Although he was part of the Warbound and considered himself a friend of the Hulk, he also allowed the death of the Hulk's wife and many others on Sakaar.
  - No-Name of the Brood – Sole survivor of a pack of Brood warriors that landed on Sakaar. Unlike most other members of her race she has the capacity for compassion.
  - Arch-E-5912 – A robot who aids Hulk in the fight against the Red King. Later piloted the ship that brought Hulk back to Earth. Self-destructed from a malfunction.
- Weapon H - Clayton Cortez was an ex-military mercenary who was subjected to Weapon X's experiments and enhanced with adamantium and DNA samples collected from Amadeus Cho, Old Man Logan, Domino, Lady Deathstrike, Sabretooth, and Warpath. The experiments gave him a Hulk/Wolverine appearance.

== Enemies ==
- Abomination – Emil Blonsky. A gamma-spawned monstrous powerhouse. The Hulk's primary physical rival.
- Absorbing Man – Crusher Creel. Able to magically "absorb"/duplicate the properties/powers of things/people he touches. He is also an enemy of She-Hulk and Thor.
- Armageddon – Warlord of the star-spanning Troyjan empire, with power rivalling the Silver Surfer's. He holds a grudge against the Hulk for accidentally slaying his son Trauma.
- Bi-Beast – A giant two-headed android living on a floating island in the sky, and containing the knowledge of the bird people that built it.
- Blackbird/Jackdaw – The Leader's former second-in-command, who ultimately turned against him. She was later a member of the Femizons.
- Boomerang – An Australian who gained skills with boomerangs and was recruited by a criminal organization the Secret Empire. He uses different types of boomerangs as weapons.
- Collector – A billion-year-old being, who keeps himself active by scouring the Universe for unusual additions to his planetary collections of creatures and artifacts.
- Constrictor
- Corruptor – Has the power to subvert the will of virtually any living being by mere touch.
- Devil Hulk – A persona of Bruce Banner who represents his resentment and desire for a protective parental figure.
- D'Spayre – An interdimensional demon who preys on angst and hopelessness.
- The Eldest – The firstborn of the Mother of Horrors. She took over Hulk's body after separating him from Bruce Banner.
- Flux – A soldier exposed to a gamma bomb detonation by General Ryker. Deceased.
- Galaxy Master – A shapeshifting alien weapon and conqueror that destroys any intelligent life it considers to be a potential threat.
- Gamma Corps – A series of mutated superhuman military operatives with personal grudges, originally employed by General John Ryker.
- Gargoyle
- Glenn Talbot – Betty Ross' ex-husband, a military officer who tried to kill Bruce Banner and destroy the Hulk. Was the one who personally discovered the truth of Banner's Hulk condition from Rick Jones (who believed that Banner was dead at the time) and revealed it to his superiors. Deceased.
- Glob – A shambling bog-monster, with high resistance to physical harm.
- Gremlin – The misshapen, supergenius, Russian son of the Hulk's first enemy, the Gargoyle.
- Grey Gargoyle – A super-strong thief and mercenary, able to turn others to stone with a touch. The Hulk's healing factor fought off the transformation.
- Guilt Hulk
- Halflife – Anthony Masterson, a gamma-irradiated power-leech. Dead during the day, and alive during the night. Deceased.
- Hammer and Anvil – An embittered African-American and a white supremacist. Escaped convicts permanently shackled to each other by a chain granting them both great physical power, and bonding their life-forces together. Deceased.
- Harpy – When Betty Ross was bombarded with radiation she was molded by MODOK into the villainous Harpy, a gamma form of pure jealousy and misanthropic rage.
- Humanoids – An army of artificial humanoids who serve the Leader.
- Igor Drenkov – A Russian scientist
- John Ryker – A ruthless military general, and brilliant manipulator, who hunted the Hulk to seek a cure for his wife.
- Juggernaut - A super-strong, nearly indestructible villain whose power rivals that of the Hulk's. The character is also known into coming into contact with the X-Men and Spider-Man.
- Killer Shrike
- Leader – A gamma-irradiated genius with superhuman intelligence and mind-control abilities who is Hulk's intellectual rival.
- Madman – The Leader's brother, a chaotic, distorted, and clever powerhouse.
- Maestro – A barbaric and crafty future version of the Hulk. He is stated as twice as strong as the 'merged' incarnation, and is an experienced, ruthless and dishonourable combatant.
- Man-Beast – A wolf evolved into a humanoid form by the High Evolutionary. A super-strong malevolent schemer with great psychic powers.
- Mercy – An enigmatic immortal with multiple powers, including shapeshifting, draining, teleportation, energy-projection, invisibility, astral projection, and self re-assembly. She considers herself on a mission of "mercy" to "help" those who wish to die but do not have the strength to commit suicide.
- Metal Master – Hulk's first superhuman adversary. An alien conqueror with practically limitless ability to control all forms of metal.
- Minotaur -
- Missing Link – A radioactive monster with immense strength, a childlike personality, and the ability to reform itself after being destroyed.
- Mister Hyde – A savage, super-strong, dark mirror of the Hulk. The character is also known for primarily being an enemy to Thor.
- MODOK – His name is an acronym for Mental Organism Designed Only for Killing. He possesses vast offensive psionic powers and computing intelligence, and is the leader of A.I.M.
- Moonstone – An utterly amoral criminal psychiatrist, with super-strength, force-blasts, intangibility, flight, and capable of quickly coercing mental breakdowns.
- Mother of Horrors – Real name Vinruivel is an entity born without the One Above All and the maker of monsters.
- Night Flyer – The Night Flyer was a noted hit man and mercenary, later resurrected by the Corruptor as a clone tied to his glider tasked with hunting down The Hulk.
- Nightmare – An immensely powerful dream demon, responsible for driving the Hulk mad and exiled many years ago; later caused the death of Hulk's first unborn child, and raped his wife Betty in her sleep; He also plagued Hulk with nightmarish reality-distortions, including the "Devil-Hulk" and the "Homebase" conspiracy.
- One Below All - the Dark half and counterpart of the One Above All.
- Piecemeal – A monster engineered from an unwilling scientist, at the Red Skull's behest, mixing up the attributes of any super-beings it encounters.
- Psyklop – A humanoid insect scientist-mystic, worshiping a race of elder gods and seeking to use the Hulk as a power-source to revive them. Deceased.
- Puffball Collective – An alien group-mind that kept Hulk company during his exile to the crossroads dimension. It is later revealed to have summoned the N'Garai, who ravaged its home planet. The character was created by writer Bill Mantlo and artist Sal Buscema, and first appeared in Incredible Hulk #301 (August 1984).
- Ravage – A gamma induced monster, created by Professor Geoffrey Crawford's attempts to cure himself of a crippling disease using his Matter Teleportation Device.
- Red King – The despotic emperor of the planet Sakaar, dethroned by the Hulk and his Warbound.
- Redeemer – A Hulkbuster member who wore the Redeemer Armor.
- Reginald Fortean – A U.S. Air Force General who was Thunderbolt Ross' former protégé. He is obsessed with seeking revenge on the Red Hulk (who he believes killed Ross) unaware that Red Hulk and Ross are one and the same person. He used a gun on Red Hulk that shot remote-activated micro-mines into Red Hulk's brain that would fry Red Hulk's brain when Red Hulk changes back. Reginald later fought Red She-Hulk. He has since taken command of Shadow Base, a black ops anti-Hulk military squad utterly determined at the destruction and study of the Hulk. After the failure of the Abomination/Rick Jones fusion Subject B, he fused himself with Subject B's husk, turning himself into a new monstrous version of Subject B.
- Rhino – A rhinoceros-based villain with super strength, speed, and tough hide like a rhino. The character is also known as an adversary to Spider-Man.
- Rock – A former Hulkbusters member who Leader permanently bonded to a rock-skinned exoskeleton.
- Speedfreek – An assassin who wears powered armor granting him superhuman speed, durability and adamantium weaponry. Speedfreek was killed by Nitro at the beginning of the "Civil War" storyline.
- Super-Adaptoid – An android with the powers of the Avengers.
- Thunderbolt Ross – Betty Ross' father and the Hulk's nemesis, a military general who used to hunt him. He later became Red Hulk.
- Trauma – Prince of the Troyjans. An immensely strong warrior, with force-blasts capable of cutting through planets. Deceased.
- Tyrannus – An ancient Roman would-be world conqueror, and long-time Hulk villain.
- Umar – A vastly powerful, sadistic and hedonistic, immortal sorceress, and sister of the mystic entity Dormammu. She finds the Hulk attractive, and has tried to make him into her personal enforcer and sex slave.
- Wendigo – A large cannibalistic monster from the Canadian North Woods.
- Alex Wildman – An unpredictable scrawny lunatic, in pink bunny slippers, who can temporarily 'borrow' the abilities of the main superheroes on Earth, but is limited to one at a time.
- Xemnu – An alien with superhuman strength, and vast psionic powers, capable of engineering formidable genetic monstrosities.
- Zzzax – Electricity-based villain/monster with superhuman strength and the ability to incinerate almost anything it touches. It gains intelligence by feeding on the minds of human beings.

== Group enemies ==
- Changelings
  - Centauria
  - Centaurio
  - Centauron
  - Dovina
  - Elephantine
  - Fury
  - Leoninus
  - Minotaurus
  - Neptunus
  - Pantherus
  - Siren
  - Viperus
  - Woodgod
- Circus of Crime
  - Ringmaster
- Gamma Corps
  - Grey
  - Griffin
  - Mess
  - Mister Gideon
  - Prodigy
- Home Base
  - Agent Pratt – A malicious calculating operative working for a secret government agency called Home Base. He has a genetic ability to regrow limbs upon death. Quotes Stephen Hawking and appears to be a genius.
- Hulkbusters – Various incarnations of military units dedicated to putting the Hulk down.
  - Thunderbolt Ross
  - John Ryker
  - Glenn Talbot
  - Clay Quartermain
  - Thomas Bowman
  - Jack Armbruster
  - Edwin Maxwell
  - Agent Lindsay
- Hulk-Hunters
  - Empress Daydra
  - Amphibion – Qnax. The sometimes ally, sometimes enemy, warrior champion of the planet Xantares, with great superhuman strength.
  - Dark-crawler
  - Torgo
- Pantheon – A pro-active organization of super-powered beings descended from the immortal Agamemnon and titled after the participants in the Trojan War.
  - Achilles (Helmut Halfling) – Agamemnon's super-strong right-hand man. Achilles is invulnerable except when he is close to low-level gamma radiation. He is killed in a battle with Ulysses (Charles). He is the son of Agamemnon.
  - Agamemnon (Vali Halfling) – Agamemnon is the immortal founder and leader of the Pantheon. He is the son of Loki and an unknown mortal woman. He is the father of Achilles. Turned weary, bored and immensely cynical from his millennia of existence, Cyclically builds and destroys civilizations as a personal hobby.
  - Ajax – An immensely strong childlike bruiser, and member of the Pantheon. Like the Hulk his power increases with his rage, and he has considered the latter as a friend in the past. Ajax must wear an exoskeleton to support his massive frame.
  - Andromeda – Andromeda has the ability to see the future. She is the mother of Delphi.
  - Atalanta – Atalanta uses a bow and arrows that are made of plasma energy.
  - Cassiopea – Cassiopea has the ability to absorb energy and return it in the form of concussive blasts. She is the daughter of Perseus.
  - Delphi – Delphi has the ability to see the future. She is the daughter of Andromeda and Jason.
  - Hector – Hector uses a mace made of plasma energy and has the ability to fly.
  - Jason – Jason the Renegade prefers to use guns as his weapon. He is the father of Delphi.
  - Paris (Nathan Taylor) – Paris is a manipulative prude with empathic abilities, and brief leader of the Pantheon, with grudges against both the Hulk and Ulysses.
  - Perseus (Scott Shannon) – Perseus uses an energy spear. He is killed by Madman. He is the father of Cassiopea.
  - Prometheus – Prometheus has a tracking sense that works over great distances, even across space.
  - Ulysses – The original Ulysses uses a plasma shield and sword. He is killed by Achilles.
  - Ulysses – A slow-aging former 50s biker rebel, and Pantheon warrior, using a very formidable plasma energy sword and shield.
- Riot Squad – A superpowered unit of the Leader's henchmen, and citizens of his Arctic-based utopia, Freehold.
  - Hotshot
  - Jailbait
  - Ogress – A gamma infused female attorney named Diane Davids. Ogress was a creation of the Leader and later became a member of the Riot Squad.
  - Omnibus – The Leader's supergenius second in command, and briefly serving as a host for his spirit. Deceased.
  - Rock – A morphing boulder, capable of severely damaging even the Hulk. Former member of the Hulkbusters.
  - Redeemer – An armored living weapons arsenal. Former member of the Hulkbusters.
  - Soul Man
- U-Foes – A Fantastic Four counterpart. They blame the Hulk for interrupting the experiment that granted them their powers.
  - Vector
  - Ironclad
  - Vapor
  - X-Ray

== Neutral rivals ==
- Iron Man – Bruce Banner's friend, who battles the Hulk with his Hulkbuster armor when necessary and tries to cure Bruce of the Hulk.
- Namor – The ruler of the world's oceans, and a grudging recurrent ally, but their respective hot tempers have created a strong rivalry and many confrontations over the years.
- Sabra – An Israeli mutant superhero who has superhuman strength amongst other mutant powers. She and the Hulk have frequently clashed due to misunderstandings.
- Sasquatch
- Spider-Man
- Thing – Ben Grimm, a member of the Fantastic Four, and a frequent rival of the Hulk's, due to consistently being defeated at his hands. They have nonetheless come to understand each other.
- Thor – The god of thunder and Hulk's main rival among other superheroes, with many inconclusive confrontations over the years.
- Thundra
- Wolverine

== Other enemies ==
- Annihilus
- Arsenal
- Attuma
- Captain Axis – Otto Kronsteig
- Captain Barracuda – A modern-day pirate and enemy of Namor who Hulk fought one time.
- Captain Cybor – A disfigured cyborg who captains the Andromeda in manic pursuit of the space monster that crippled him.
- Captain Omen – The leader of the Infra-Worlders. Originally, his main goal is to rule three-fourths of the world, the parts underwater. His hidden lair was later adopted by another sea pirate, Captain Barracuda.
- Cobalt Man
- Crypto-Man – A one time Thor foe and the robot responsible for the death of the Hulk's great love Jarella.
- Devastator
- Doctor Doom
- Doctor Frye
- Dogs of War – Mutated gamma dogs who functioned as a testbed for mutation and deadly weapons of General Ryker.
- Dragonus – Wizard from Terragonia
- Droog – Appears in The Incredible Hulk vol. 2 #188. A creature the Gremlin raised in the Bio-Genetic lab that resembles a Triceratops. He is commonly used by the Gremlin to keep order amongst his troops. Despite its appearance, it seems to be quite intelligent, his manner of speech is that of poems. Hulk battles Droog, telling Thunderbolt Ross to take the others and get out of Bitterfrost (one of the Gremlin's bases) before it explodes (one of the few times Ross is hesitant to let the Hulk die). It is presumed that Droog died in the explosion.
- Farnoq Dahn – Real name Sawalha Dahn
- Fialan
- Fragment
- General Fang
- Ghoul – Dennis Malloy
- Glazier
- Godseye
- Gog
- Gold Bug
- High Evolutionary
- The Inheritor
- Judson Jakes
- Warlord Kaa – He appears in Incredible Hulk #184, but he and his race's true appearance was in Strange Tales #79. Leader of a parallel Earth Shadow Realm. When he reappeared, he was able to steal absorb Hulk's shadow unto himself and gain a physical form that afforded him an intangible state and Hulk's strength, battling him in the Oklahoma plains until they reached the grid. However, due to him being nothing but a shadow, when more lights from the electric grid were activated by pure chance, his body was dissolved to dust and, before he had a chance to get his mind out of the shadow, his body was turned to dust. Kaa was able to survive, however, since he fought the Champions.
- Klaatu – A humanoid alien who is the fixation of Captain Cybor and the Andromeda's first mate Xeron the Star-Slayer.
- It! The Living Colossus
- Lord Visis
- Locust – August Hopper is an entomologist who uses insects in his crimes.
- Magog
- Maha Yogi – An ancient mutant and sorcerer with various psychic powers.
- Man-Beast
- Man-Bull
- Matt Talbot – The nephew of Glenn Talbot, and an old friend of Cathy St. Lawrence. He wanted to avenge his uncle by hunting down the Hulk, but was diagnosed with cancer.
- Hulk Robot
- Megalith
- Mistress Fara
- Mongu – Boris Monguski
- Night Flier
- Pariah
- Professor Phobos
- Quintronic Man – A giant robot powered by a five-man crew. First appearance vol.2 #213 (1977). Following a first round victory, the Quintronic Man did not fare well when he was handily overpowered and outsmarted by The Hulk. Contrary to erroneous reports, the Quintronic members were not killed in this conflict and were quickly rescued with a timely assist by Jack of Hearts.
- Sandman
- Shanzar – The Sorcerer Supreme of the Strange Matter Dimension. He got tired of protecting his reality from threats and eradicated every sentient being in it, but eventually grew bored and decided to seek out and conquer other realms.
- Space Parasite – Randau is an alien conqueror with virtually unlimited ability to absorb energy who goes by the name of Space Parasite.
- Stalker – Gil Jeffers
- Max Stryker
- Super Humanoid
- Supreme Dictator – Václav Draxon
- Swamp Men
- Toad Men – Short, squat-faced aliens with magnetic weaponry, and delusions of conquest. Once devastated Washington D.C., killing many military pilots. They are led by Queen Frojya, whatever technology they gained were by stealing it by it from other alien races.
- Vegetable
- Xeron the Star-Slayer – An Ahab-like harpooner obsessed with capturing Klaatu, an alien who disfigured half of his body. He shanghaied both the Hulk and the Abomination to better pursue his quarry and attain his revenge on the space monster.
- Yuri Brevlov

== Red Hulk's enemies ==
- Black Fog – A serial killer from India who was captured by the authorities and beaten up badly by the families of his victims. He was freed by Zero/One, who replaced his lost limbs with cybernetic limbs and gave him the ability to transform into a black fog-like substance in her plots to dispose of Red Hulk.
- Omegex – A powerful alien robot built by an ancient alien race who brings an end to the worlds he visits. It is powered by the souls of his victims.
- Sultan Magus – Dagan Shah is a rebel leader who came across Regillian technology and used their weapons to sell to terrorists while organizing Sharzhad on the borders of Libya. Red Hulk and Machine Man came to Sharzhad to investigate Dagan Shah (who Red Hulk believed to be behind the death of his old friend that Reginald Fortean also knows).
- Zero/One – Dr. Parul Kurinji was a scientist who was exposed to a virus created by MODOK. She became an enemy of Red Hulk.
  - Jacob Feinman – A scientist who fell victim to the Scorched Earth protocols left by Intelligencia, which horribly scarred his face. He was approached by Zero/One, who agreed to restore his face in exchange for his services.
