= Gamma Corps =

Fictional military unit

The Gamma Corps is the name of two fictional Gamma-based military units appearing in American comic books published by Marvel Comics.

== Publication history ==
The original Gamma Corps first appears in World War Hulk: Gamma Corps #1, and was created by Frank Tieri and Carlos Ferreira.

The second Gamma Corps first appeared in The Incredible Hulk vol. 2 #601 and was created by Greg Pak and Ariel Olivetti.

== Fictional history ==
=== First Gamma Corps ===
Gamma Corps
- The Gamma Corps. Art by Stephane Roux.

Publication information
- Publisher: Marvel Comics
- First appearance: World War Hulk: Gamma Corps #1 (July 2007)
- Created by: Frank Tieri; Carlos Ferreira

In-story information
- Member(s): Grey; Griffin; Mess; Mister Gideon; Prodigy

The Gamma Corps were selected as individuals whose lives had in some way been harmed or ruined by the Hulk. Using Hulk's DNA (acquired from the scene of a battle with Wolverine), these people were transformed into gamma-irradiated supersoldiers. The team was assembled by General John Ryker with the objective of destroying the Hulk.

The Gamma Corps are armed with a variety of military weapons and have been trained to destroy the Hulk. Gideon, Grey and Mess are in the group because they hold the Hulk responsible for the loss of their loved ones, while Griffin and Prodigy hold more personal grudges against the Hulk.

The Gamma Corps later appear in World War Hulk. After failing to defeat the Hulk, the Gamma Corps discover that he was not directly responsible for their individual situations, so they pursue the people who were, the Illuminati.

The Gamma Corps return in the Dark Reign: Made Men series. Without the backing of the US government, the Gamma Corps become fugitives while continuing to search for the Illuminati. Prodigy believes Iron Man is approaching their base, alerting the group, but the Corps is surprised when it is Iron Patriot who arrives. Afraid he has come to arrest them, the group lashes out, unwilling to listen to him. Once Prodigy incapacitates the Patriot, Grey allows him to speak. He offers the Corps a chance at redemption by becoming his bounty hunters, bringing unregistered superhumans to justice. Eager to regain a purpose, the Gamma Corps agree.

The Gamma Corps later encounter Hulk's Doc Green form. Doc Green saves them from the Doc Green A.I. and then removes their powers.

=== Gamma Corps: Black ===
Some time later, John Ryker (under the auspices of Norman Osborn) creates a second Gamma Corps, composed of female "volunteers" (mentally unstable ex-soldiers on death row) for the Origins Corporation's gene therapy program and sends them to capture She-Hulk (Lyra) so that her DNA can be harvested. They kill Lyra's fellow A.R.M.O.R. agents and take her computer Boudicca from her, driving her to hunt them down, then kill Gamma Corps member Morass by drying out her body. The remaining two flee to a small town, attempting to hold the people hostage to make Lyra surrender. In the ensuing battle, Lyra badly wounds Aberration before killing her with a pipe to the head. Axon threatens to electrocute all the townspeople unless Lyra surrenders. Axon siphons most of Lyra's energy, absorbing her powers. Lyra makes Axon angry, waning the stolen powers (Lyra's own Achilles' Heel), allowing Lyra to defeat her. Ryker's men then kill Axon by remote.

== Members ==
=== First Gamma Corps members ===
- Grey - Lieutenant Brian Talbot is the younger brother of Colonel Glenn Talbot. Given powers using Hulk and Leader's DNA, Talbot was trained in martial arts and is a brilliant military strategist. Talbot can assume a Grey Hulk-like appearance at will.
- Griffin - Private First Class Eliot Franklin, formerly Clown of the Circus of Crime. A Harpy-like man who resembles Betty Ross's Harpy form. He has sharp claws and talons and can spit corrosive venom. Griffin is shown to be somewhat mentally unstable, and apparently joined because he just wants someone to be mad at.
- Mess - Corporal Nicole Martin is a red-haired woman resembling the Abomination. She and her son were caught in the sidelines of a battle between Hulk and Abomination. Consequently, her son died in a car fire and she was left badly scarred. Parts of her body were replaced with parts cloned from Abomination. While her Abomination parts possess superhuman qualities, her human parts retain normal human strength and durability. She is skilled at marksmanship and is the most well-trained member of the team.
- Mister Gideon - Gideon Wilson is a Master Sergeant and former Catholic minister who is the father of Jim Wilson. He blames the Hulk for his son's death. A muscular African-American man similar to Doc Samson, Gideon is armed with titanium brass knuckles. Gideon originally blamed Hulk for his son's death until Hulk told him that he had refused to give a blood transfusion to Jim out of fear that he would become a Hulk like him. Gideon realizes that his hatred was self-directed and later offers advice to the Hulk about his own revenge pursuits.
- Prodigy - Private Timothy Wilkerson was created using the Leader's DNA and artificially aged. While he was still in the womb, his mother was frightened by the Hulk's appearance and suffered a stroke that affected her son's development. Prodigy has limited telepathic abilities and can project psychic blasts. He is responsible for creating the team's equipment. Prodigy later discovered that the real cause of his condition was his mother taking heroin while she was pregnant.

=== Gamma Corps: Black members ===
- Aberration - Private Rana Philips is another Abomination/human hybrid experiment who is similar to Mess, but with the result being more akin to a thinner version of the Abomination. Her commanding officer used her as a scapegoat for his torture of prisoners, leading her to kill him and be sentenced to death herself. This left Rana her open for the chance to be altered by Ryker instead.
- Axon - Staff Sergeant Erin Cicero is a human/Zzzax creation. Following a military skirmish, she suffered post-traumatic stress disorder, leaving her so paranoid that she believed everyone around her was an enemy agent, leading her to kill her squad and her family. Erin was sentenced to death and given the choice to be part of Ryker's experiments instead. Axon is the most vicious of the group, electrocuting a wounded A.R.M.O.R. agent just for the sheer fun of it.
- Morass - A human/Glob fusion.
