= Mongu (disambiguation) =

Mongu is a city in the Western Province, Zambia.

Mongu could also refer to:

- Mosharraf Hossain Mongu, Bangladeshi parliamentarian
- Mongu (comics), a fictional character in the Marvel Comics universe
