= The Incredible Hulk (1996 TV series) =

American animated television series

- Season one title card
- Also known as: The Incredible Hulk and She-Hulk (S2)
- Genre: Superhero; Action
- Based on: Hulk by: Stan Lee; Jack Kirby
- Starring: Neal McDonough; Lou Ferrigno; Luke Perry; Genie Francis; Philece Sampler; John Vernon; Kevin Schon; Michael Donovan (S2); Cree Summer (S2); Matt Frewer; Mark Hamill; Richard Moll; Kathy Ireland
- Narrated by: Richie Johnson (episode 2 opening narration)
- Composers: Shuki Levy; Kussa Mahchi; Dean Grinsfelder; Kenneth Burgomaster; David Ari Leon
- Country of origin: United States
- Original language: English
- No. of seasons: 2
- No. of episodes: 21

Production
- Executive producers: Avi Arad; Stan Lee; Rick Ungar
- Producers: Dick Sebast (S1); Ron Myrick (S2)
- Running time: 22 minutes
- Production companies: New World Animation(S1); Saban Entertainment (S2); Marvel Films; Saerom Animation

Original release
- Network: UPN
- Release: September 8, 1996 – November 23, 1997

Related
- The Incredible Hulk; Hulk and the Agents of S.M.A.S.H.

The Incredible Hulk is an American animated television series starring the Marvel Comics character the Hulk. It aired for two seasons (21 episodes) on UPN from 1996 to 1997. Lou Ferrigno, who had portrayed the Hulk on the live-action TV series from 1978 to 1982, had provided the Hulk's voice.

The show had often featured cameo appearances by characters from other Marvel cartoons of the period. In the second season, the show's format, after UPN decided that season one was too dark, was changed and to give "female viewers a chance", the network had ordered that She-Hulk be made a regular co-star - as a result, the series was officially renamed The Incredible Hulk and She-Hulk for the second season. The second season had also featured Grey Hulk, who previously made two cameo appearances in the first season.

== Series overview ==
=== Season 1 ===
The first season begins with Bruce Banner already established as the Hulk and on the run, when he is captured by the military after another attempt at ridding himself of the beast within goes awry due to the sabotage of Major Glenn Talbot. He eventually escapes and falls into the hands of the Leader who is served by the Gargoyle and the Abomination. The intervention of mutated cave-dwelling gamma creatures called the Outcasts, Banner's loyal best friend Rick Jones, and the love of his life Betty Ross (like in many comic book incarnations, Betty along with Doc Samson is seen here trying to find a cure for Bruce).

As in the comics, Thunderbolt Ross is a former 4-star turned 3-star general who sends Army forces and Hulkbusters (Craig Saunders and Samuel LaRoquette were also mentioned as members) to capture or destroy the Hulk. He also fights the Hulk personally, using a gamma-powered laser gun created by Bruce against the creature in "Return of the Beast", and again in "Darkness and Light". Talbot was shown acting as the right-hand man of Ross. He is also shown to have a romantic interest in Betty Ross, but she constantly rejects him because he never does a very good job of hiding his disdain for either Bruce Banner or the Hulk.

Traveling across the nation and beyond, Banner meets kindred spirits also battling similar problems, fights beings of pure energy, and must endure an alliance with the Gargoyle to provide the antidote to a viral epidemic that nearly takes Betty's life and countless others. Not even his family is safe from the terror his hidden powers bring, as his best friend and cousin Jennifer Walters is critically injured by Doctor Doom, forcing Banner to give her a blood transfusion that transforms her into the She-Hulk. Jennifer takes immediate delight in her transformed body and chooses to remain in her She-Hulk form full-time.

Dorian Harewood reprised his role of War Machine from the solo Iron Man animated series in the episode "Helping Hand, Iron Fist". He originally stops Rick Jones from seeing Tony Stark (voiced by Robert Hays, who was also reprising his Iron Man role) at Stark Enterprises, but takes him to Stark after Jones explained that he needed Stark's help to find Banner. He later alerts Stark to the arrival of Ross, S.H.I.E.L.D. agent Gabe Jones, and a squad of Hulkbusters. War Machine fights some of the Hulkbusters alongside Jones and Iron Man.

Sasquatch appeared in the episode "Man to Man, Beast to Beast" voiced by Peter Strauss (Walter Langkowski) and Clancy Brown (Sasquatch). In that episode, Bruce Banner comes to Canada hoping to find his old friend Dr. Walter Langkowski (Sasquatch) to get a cure for himself and get rid of Hulk forever, only to find that Walter has developed a bestial alter ego while using himself as a test subject to make a breakthrough in gamma radiation. After battling the Hulk, Walter/Sasquatch exiles himself to the wilderness when his actions put Hulk's new friend, a small boy named Taylor, in danger.

Simon Templeman reprised his role of Doctor Doom (who as previously mentioned, critically injured Jennifer Walters/She-Hulk) for guest appearances in two episodes, in which Doom held Washington, D.C. captive, only to be defeated by She-Hulk, whom he later attempted to claim revenge upon. With his appearance on this show, it can be assumed that Doom survived the fate he met on the Fantastic Four series if both shows are to be considered within the same continuity.

Following Doctor Doom's first appearance (he would appear again in the second-season episode "Hollywood Rocks"), came the episode "Fantastic Fortitude" featuring his nemesis, the Fantastic Four. The episode seems to place this show in the same continuity as the Fantastic Four series of the same decade, as this episode plays off the Hulk's appearance in the other show. More to the point, Beau Weaver (Reed Richards/Mister Fantastic) and Chuck McCann (Ben Grimm/The Thing) reprised their roles from the Fantastic Four series. In the episode, Mister Fantastic and the other Fantastic Four take their vacation before Hulk, She-Hulk, and Thing fight Leader's Gamma Soldiers commanded by Leader's minion Ogress. Meanwhile, She-Hulk flirted with Thing, but Ben chose to rekindle his relationship with Alicia Masters. While the Yancy Street Gang was absent in Fantastic Four, they appeared in "Fantastic Fortitude", where they pull a prank on the Thing. After he is defeated by Ogress, the Gang distributes leaflets marked "The Thing Whopped by a Woman!".

Also reprising his role from Fantastic Four was John Rhys-Davies as Thor in "Mortal Bounds", while Mark L. Taylor voiced his alter-ego Donald Blake. Donald as Thor brought Hulk to Detroit so that Bruce Banner can help cure a gamma-based outbreak unintentionally caused by Gargoyle in his attempt to cure his disfigurement.

Throughout the season running sub-plots gradually unfold, centering mostly on several of the supporting cast, the season slowly covers the following:

- Betty attempts to construct a Gamma Nutrient Bath that will separate Banner from the Hulk with the aid of Doc Samson.
- The Leader's fragile association with Gargoyle slowly breaks down, shattering completely before eventually reforming before the finale. This Gargoyle is the Yuri Topolov version who was always trying to find a cure for his mutation, even allying himself with The Leader. In "Mortal Bounds," he accidentally released a gamma virus (infecting amongst others Betty Ross) in his search for a cure. When Ross is dying from the virus, Gargoyle gives Banner the antidote, warning that the next time they met he would not be so favorable.
- The Leader succeeds in bringing to life obedient mutant Gamma Warriors. who are created from Hulk's DNA and sport cybernetic parts. Two of them were named in the toy line: the female Gamma Warrior with the chainsaw for a right arm is named Chainsaw and the two-headed Gamma Warrior with a cannon for a right hand is named Two-Head. The rest of the Gamma Warriors consist of an unnamed Gamma Warrior with fangs, an unnamed Gamma Warrior with missile launchers on his back, an unnamed Gamma Warrior with a flail for a right hand, and an unnamed Gamma Warrior with metallic jaws and rotating blades for a right hand. They are led by Ogress.
- Ross' tempered alliance with Agent Gabe Jones of S.H.I.E.L.D., a ruthless covert operative whose orders were to destroy the creature completely upon capture. In the series finale, "Mission: Incredible", it was revealed that Jones was partially responsible for the accident that turned a double agent named Diana into the Hybrid when she fell into a tank of newly discovered organisms (which S.H.I.E.L.D. was experimenting on) at a S.H.I.E.L.D. Sea Base when she was hired to steal one of those organisms. Also in that episode, he starts hitting on She-Hulk.

These plot threads converge in the three-part season finale "Darkness and Light", where Betty's gamble pays off and the Hulk and Banner are separated. The Hulk emerges virtually mindless and unrestrained. Banner feels responsible and confronts the creature in an armored battlesuit. The Leader finally gains the power of the Hulk, but the savage Hulk personality takes over, driving him mad, and forcing him to abandon the power and restore it to the creature.

Meanwhile, Ross, betrayed by Jones during the finale, experiences a mental breakdown. Though hospitalized and in critical condition, Ross interrupts Banner's wedding ceremony and threatens to kill Banner, who suffers a heart attack, as the separation from the Hulk finally begins taking its toll. This leads Banner's friends into concluding that he and the Hulk must be merged again, or both will die.

Ross flees but later returns in an attempt to sabotage the re-merge experiment. He is interrupted by Rick, whom he hurls into the vat containing Banner and the Hulk. The experiment malfunctions and the vat erupts; from it emerges a gamma-powered, Hulk-like Jones, who escapes into the night, as Banner suddenly transforms into the Grey Hulk.

=== Season 2 ===
The Incredible Hulk and She-Hulk begins where the first season concluded, with the Grey Hulk in the mountains, solely pursued by Ross. An altercation between the two results in an avalanche that puts Ross in a coma, and knocks out Banner. When Banner comes to, he is arrested and placed on trial, while Rick Jones continues his own reign of terror. Banner's cousin Jennifer, the She-Hulk, tries to help him out in court. After defending the entire courthouse from an attack by the Leader and successfully locating and restoring Rick to normal, both Banner and Jennifer travel together, lying low.

Aside from a small continuation of the premiere episode, the season featured very few ongoing arcs, the only ones of note were the following:

- Thunderbolt Ross is hospitalized.
- Gargoyle displays a strong affection for She-Hulk.
- Rick Jones no longer plays an active role (except in Bruce's memories).
- Banner becomes more quick-witted and calm due to no longer being hunted by the army. He still tries to cure himself of becoming the Hulk.
- Whenever Banner transforms, Grey Hulk and Green Hulk fight for control in Banner's mind and the one who wins, breaks out.

The remainder of the season saw Banner and Jennifer either team up with characters such as Doctor Strange, battle Doctor Doom once more, and participate in a fight during Jennifer's high school reunion party. The episode "Mind Over Anti-Matter" features Strange and She-Hulk journeying into the mind of Bruce Banner when Banner is possessed by a demonic alien. Banner in the process turns into a monstrous Dark Hulk. She-Hulk provides levity at the sorcerer's expense by referring to him as Doctor Peculiar and other variations of his name. The Grey Hulk's mob persona of "Mr. Fixit" surfaced for a brief appearance.

This season won an Emmy Award for "best audio editing" for the work on the episode "The Lost Village".

== Cast ==
- Neal McDonough – Bruce Banner (all episodes)
  - Lou Ferrigno – Hulk (all episodes)
  - Michael Donovan – Grey Hulk (5 episodes)
- Genie Francis – Betty Ross (first voice, 6 episodes), Sister Rose Erak (season 1, episode 5)
- Philece Sampler – Betty Ross (second voice, 9 episodes)
- Kevin Michael Richardson – Dark Hulk (season 2, episode 3)
- Luke Perry – Rick Jones (10 episodes)
- John Vernon – Thunderbolt Ross (14 episodes)
- Kevin Schon – Glenn Talbot, Abomination (first voice, 2 episodes), Samuel LaRoquette, Zzzax (season 1, episode 3)
- Matt Frewer – Samuel Sterns / Leader
- Mark Hamill – Gargoyle (11 episodes)
- Kathy Ireland – Ogress (5 episodes)
- Richard Moll – Abomination (second voice, 3 episodes), Homeless Man (season 1, episode 9)
- Shadoe Stevens – Doc Samson (season 1; 6 episodes)
- Thom Barry – Gabe Jones (8 episodes)
- Lisa Zane – Jennifer Walters / She-Hulk (season 1; 2 episodes)
- Cree Summer – Jennifer Walters / She-Hulk (season 2; 8 episodes)
- Michael Bell as Mitch McCutcheon / Zzzax (season 1, episode 3)
- Robert Hays as Tony Stark / Iron Man (season 1, episode 4)
  - Dorian Harewood as War Machine / James Rhodes (season 1, episode 4)
  - Tom Kane as H.O.M.E.R. (season 1, episode 4)
- Simon Templeman as Doctor Doom (2 episodes)
- Richard Grieco – Ghost Rider (season 1, episode 5)
- Peter Strauss – Walter Langkowski (season 1, episode 6)
  - Clancy Brown – Sasquatch (season 1, episode 6)
- Leigh Baker Bailey as Taylor (season 1, episode 6), Maureen (season 1, episode 6)
- Eric Vesbit as John (season 1, episode 6)
- Beau Weaver – Reed Richards / Mister Fantastic (season 1, episode 8)
- Chuck McCann – Benjamin "Ben" Jacob Grimm / The Thing (season 1, episode 8)
- John Rhys Davies as Thor (season 1, episode 9)
  - Mark L. Taylor as Dr. Donald Blake (season 1, episode 9)
- Michael Horse – Jefferson Whitedeer (season 1, episode 10)
- Leeza Miller McGee as Wendigo (season 1, episode 10)
- Stan Lee as Cliff Walters (season 2, episode 2)
- Maurice LaMarche – Doctor Strange (season 2, episode 3)
- Jennifer Hale as Miss Allure (season 2, episode 4)
  - Jim Cummings as Crusher Creel / Absorbing Man (season 2, episode 4)
- Tom Kane as Scimitar (season 2, episode 7)
- Dawnn Lewis as Hybrid (season 2, episode 8)

== Crew ==
- Stu Rosen – Casting director
- Tom Tataranowicz – Voice director (season 1)
- Jamie Simone – Voice director (season 2)
- Greg Johnson – Story editor

== Episodes ==
=== Series overview ===
Season	Episodes	Originally released	
Season	Episodes	First released	Last released
1	13	September 8, 1996	February 16, 1997
2	8	September 21, 1997	November 23, 1997

=== Season 1 (1996–1997) ===
No. overall	No. in season	Title	Directed by	Written by	Original release date
1	1	"Return of the Beast"	Richard Trueblood	Bob Forward	September 8, 1996
2	2	"Return of the Beast"	Leo D. Sullivan	Bob Forward	September 15, 1996
After another attempt to cure himself of the Incredible Hulk fails due to the interference of Major Glenn Talbot, Bruce Banner is taken to Gamma Base, where he is allowed to try another experiment to do so with the help of his lover, Betty Ross. However, the gamma-mutated super genius, the Leader, wants the power of the Hulk for himself and sends the Abomination to capture Banner. Hulk escapes from the destroyed Gamma Base and encounters the Outcasts, creatures mutated by the same gamma explosion that created him, and hides out with them. Unfortunately, the Abomination finds him and takes him back to the Leader, who attempts to use a siphoning device to transfer the powers of the Hulk into himself.
3	3	"Raw Power"	Dan Thompson	Jess Winfield	September 22, 1996
Another attempt by Banner to get rid of his alter-ego is halted once again and results in nuclear power plant worker Mitch McCutcheon becoming the mutant electric monster Zzzax.
4	4	"Helping Hand, Iron Fist"	Ernesto Lopez	Stewart St. John	September 29, 1996
Banner reaches Los Angeles, hoping to get Tony Stark's help in curing him. But an earlier incident strikes the Hulk with amnesia, and adding to that problem, the Hulkbusters and Gabe Jones show up at Stark Enterprises to capture Banner.
5	5	"Innocent Blood"	Richard Trueblood	Bob Forward	October 6, 1996
In Chicago, the Hulk is pursued not only by the supernatural anti-hero, Ghost Rider, but also Talbot, who has a weapon that may end the Hulk once and for all. Note: This episode served as a backdoor pilot to an unnamed Ghost Rider animated series.
6	6	"Man to Man, Beast to Beast"	Tom Tataranowicz	Len Wein	October 27, 1996
While in Canada, Banner meets up with a colleague, Walter Langkowski, who he believes might help him rid himself of the Hulk. But Langkowski has a secret of his own.
7	7	"Doomed"	Dan Thompson	Bob Forward	November 3, 1996
Banner visits his cousin, Jen Walters, in Washington, D.C., but he is soon captured by Doctor Doom, who gains control over the Hulk with a mind-control device. But a blood transfusion from Banner to an injured Jen transforms her into the Sensational She-Hulk and Doom now has to deal with two gamma-powered titans.
8	8	"Fantastic Fortitude"	Tom Tataranowicz; Ernesto Lopez	Bob Forward	November 10, 1996
In New York City, Banner, and Jen try to contact the Fantastic Four. However, the Thing is the only member left as the rest of the team is on vacation. And they may need the Thing's help when the Leader and his Gamma Warriors attack.
9	9	"Mortal Bounds"	Ernesto Lopez	Story by : Greg Blair; Teleplay by : Bruce Reid Schaefer	November 17, 1996
Banner might be the only one who can cure a gamma virus in Detroit that the Gargoyle accidentally creates while trying to cure himself. But when the Gargoyle and the Abomination kidnap Banner to help themselves, the Hulk may need the help of the mighty Thor to save the city.
10	10	"And the Wind Cries... Wendigo!"	Tom Tataranowicz; Richard Trueblood	Megeen McLaughlin	November 24, 1996
The Hulk and Ross must work together to save Betty from a supernatural beast called the Wendigo. Note: Wolverine was slated to appear in this episode, but was cut out due to being on X-Men: The Animated Series.
11	11	"Darkness and Light"	Ernesto Lopez; Tom Tataranowicz	Bob Forward	February 2, 1997
12	12	"Darkness and Light"	Richard Trueblood	Steven Granat; Cydne Clark	February 9, 1997
13	13	"Darkness and Light"	Dick Sebast	Greg Johnson	February 16, 1997
Betty and Doc Samson succeed in creating the nutrient bath, and manage to separate Banner and the Hulk but Agent Gabriel Jones tries to take the Hulk to be destroyed, causing Doctor Samson to rescue him only to discover that he's unleashed a now mindless Hulk on the world. The Leader finally manages to capture him and take over his body only for his plan to backfire immensely. Banner and the Hulk face off in a climactic showdown, but during the fight, they both feel great pain as it's discovered that the separation is killing them, and to survive, they must be rejoined.

=== Season 2 (1997) ===
No. overall	No. in season	Title	Directed by	Written by	Original release date
14	1	"Hulk of a Different Color"	Ron Myrick	Bob Forward	September 21, 1997
Ross confronts the new Gray Hulk and a battle between the two results in Ross landing in a coma, and Banner being arrested. She-Hulk comes to her cousin's aid, but the Leader, now returned to his pre-mutation form, and the Gargoyle have plans for Banner's other half.
15	2	"Down Memory Lane"	Ron Myrick	Meg McLaughlin	September 28, 1997
She-Hulk's high school reunion turns sour, when not only does she start to get tired, but Gargoyle and the Abomination attack. Note: Stan Lee has a cameo as Cliff Walters, Jennifer's father and Banner's uncle.
16	3	"Mind Over Anti-Matter"	Ron Myrick	John Semper	October 5, 1997
She-Hulk teams up with Doctor Strange when Banner is possessed by an evil entity.
17	4	"They Call Me Mr. Fixit"	Ron Myrick	Bob Forward	October 26, 1997
In Chicago, Banner falls under the sway of the mind-controlling crime lord Miss Allure, who recruits him for sinister purposes. During this, Banner encounters Crusher Creel, Allure's jealous chief enforcer, who plans to take him out.
18	5	"Fashion Warriors"	Ron Myrick	John Semper	November 2, 1997
She-Hulk and Betty team up with an all female team to stop the Leader and his flunkies when they attack a Miami fashion show. Note: Lou Ferrigno has an animated cameo in this episode.
19	6	"Hollywood Rocks"	Ron Myrick	Diane Fresco	November 9, 1997
Dr. Doom returns, and steals equipment from Banner that would prevent asteroids from harming the Earth. Meanwhile, She-Hulk gets cast in a movie, but there's more to this production than it seems.
20	7	"The Lost Village"	Ron Myrick	Ann Knapp Austen & Douglas Sloan	November 16, 1997
After receiving a medallion that allows him to turn into the Hulk at will, Banner, Betty, and She-Hulk travel to Tibet to find the land of Anavrin, hoping it might have a way of ridding Banner of both Hulks. But Banner may have to forsake his potential cure to stop the cyborg Scimitar from taking over Anavrin.
21	8	"Mission: Incredible"	Ron Myrick	Megeen McLaughlin	November 23, 1997
A creature known as the Hybrid possesses Ross, forcing the Gray Hulk and She-Hulk to join forces with Gabe Jones and S.H.I.E.L.D. Note: This episode serves as the series finale to The Incredible Hulk.

== Production ==
=== First season ===
In July 1996, it was reported that UPN had ordered a 13 episode first season an animated series based on The Incredible Hulk for their Saturday-morning programming block UPN Kids for the 1996–97 television season. The first season incorporated a guest appearance from Ghost Rider as a potential backdoor pilot for a companion series that would also air on UPN. Lou Ferrigno returned to voice the Hulk after previously playing the character in the 1978 TV series. Tom Tataranowicz was selected as showrunner after retooling the second seasons of The Marvel Action Hour series Fantastic Four and Iron Man to improved critical reception from their negatively received first seasons. Tataranowicz stated their intention with The Incredible Hulk was to push the emotion and character of the series describing the show as "more like drama with action than action with drama". Like the original 1978 series, the series would take inspiration from The Fugitive focusing on Bruce Banner on the run from General Thunderbolt Ross and the Hulkbusters as he seeks a cure for his transformations. The primary villain of the first season would be The Leader voiced by Matt Frewer after having previously voiced the character in the Iron Man series.

=== Second season ===
In February 1997, UPN renewed The Incredible Hulk for an eight-episode second season due to the series performing well in the ratings, but indicated there would be a change in direction for the show such as the inclusion of She-Hulk and downplaying the military aspects seen in the first season. Story editor Greg Johnson, who returned for the second season after working on the first, stated UPN mandated a lighter tone for the series with the first episode of the season dedicated to wrapping up first season plot threads. She-Hulk was also mandated by the network to tone down the sexuality of the character and make her more of a sassy counterpart. Early ratings for the second season were reportedly up year over year, but prospects of a third season were clouded by a change in management experienced by UPN who weren't as committed to animation.

== Broadcast ==
The show was briefly aired on ABC Family as part of its unnamed pre-JETIX-era action/adventure-oriented programming kids’ morning block, following the release of the live-action film in 2003, as well as a DVD release. The show also aired on Toon Disney as a part of their primetime action-adventure block, Jetix. The show also became the last program to air on the US Jetix block and Toon Disney overall. The series previously aired on Disney XD from February 13, 2009, to March 31, 2012.

It is currently owned and distributed by the Walt Disney Company, which acquired all Fox Kids-related properties from News Corporation and Saban International in 2001.

All 21 episodes were previously available for streaming on Marvel.com and on Netflix. The series now streams on Disney+.

== Home media ==
=== VHS releases ===
==== Region 1 ====
A single VHS release, titled "Return of the Beast", which consisted of the two-parter episode of the same, was released in the United States in July 1997 by 20th Century Fox Home Entertainment under the "Fox Kids Video" imprint.

During late 1997, Telegenic Entertainment released three tapes in Canada that edited the episodes based on a particular story arc of the series. The releases were "Return of the Beast", "Raw Power", and "Innocent Blood". Each tape consisted of the respective arc, as well as two bonus episodes from other Marvel animated shows; Fantastic Four for the former two, and Iron Man for the latter.

=== DVD releases ===
==== Region 1 ====
On June 17, 2003, to coincide with the release of the live-action film, Buena Vista Home Entertainment released a DVD containing the first four episodes; "Return of the Beast Part 1 and 2" as well as "Raw Power" and "Helping Hand, Iron Fist"; edited to form a continuous feature. Bonus Features include interviews, episode facts, introductions by Stan Lee and a bonus episode of The Marvel Super Heroes featuring three Hulk segments. The DVD was also released in the United Kingdom with the same content.

==== Region 2 ====
An episode of the show was released on the DVD in issue 17 of the UK Jetix Magazine.

In April 2008, Liberation Entertainment secured the home media rights to select Marvel shows from Jetix Europe in select European territories. The company then released Series 1 in two-volume sets in May and October 2008, respectively. After Liberation closed its UK branch at the end of October, Lace International took over releasing their existing stock and released the Season Two DVD at the end of the month alongside a boxset containing the entirety of the series.

Clear Vision later took over home media rights and re-released the series on DVD in the UK, Sweden, and Germany. Series 1 on July 5, 2010, Season 2 on September 6, 2010, and a complete collection boxset on February 7, 2011.

==== Other releases ====
- A Canadian VHS containing three episodes from the "Raw Power" episodes. This is a reissue of the 1997 Marvel-New World/Telegenic VHS release (and it was mastered from one of those VHS releases); as a "Bonus" two episodes from the 1990s Fantastic Four TV series are included, just like on the VHS release.
- Canadians also received another DVD release of the first season two-parter "Return of the Beast". This was a re-release of a 2002 VHS release by Disney; the video quality of the episodes on the DVD is that of a VHS transfer. There are no bonus features or audio/subtitle selections on this DVD either.
- A VCD release by Magnavision Home Video.
- A boxed set of all the DVDs released in Poland, simply entitled "The Incredible Hulk: 1 DVD Set". The front of the box features the same graphics as "Return of the Beast".
- Several two-episode DVDs were released by Marvel in 2003 prior to the acquisition by Disney.
- Three DVDs with two episodes each were released regionally for Serbia and Montenegro, Croatia, Slovenia, Bosnia and Herzegovina, and North Macedonia with Serbian, Croatian and Slovenian dubs on them in 2003.
- The entire first season is available on Xbox Live and iTunes through Disney XD. All five seasons are also currently available for digital purchase on Vudu.
- The entire series is available on Amazon Video.
- There were also unlicensed DVDs that had The Adventure Continues on them that contained two episodes from most of the movies that were released by Marvel Films/New World Entertainment. For example, one was Fantastic Four - The Silver Surfer and the Coming of Galactus, which contained "The Silver Surfer and the Coming of Galactus", a two-part episode from the second season.
- The series became available on Disney's streaming service Disney+ upon its launch on November 12, 2019.
