= Jim Wilson (comics) =

Fictional Marvel Comics character

- Jim Wilson, from The Incredible Hulk vol. 2 #388 (December 1991). Art by Dale Keown and Mark Farmer.

Publication information
- Publisher: Marvel Comics
- First appearance: The Incredible Hulk vol. 2 #131 (September 1970)
- Created by: Roy Thomas (writer); Herb Trimpe (artist)

In-story information
- Full name: James Wilson
- Species: Human
- Team affiliations: Corporation
- Supporting character of: Hulk
- Notable aliases: Jimbo

James Wilson is a fictional character, a supporting character appearing in American comic books published by Marvel Comics. He is a supporting character of the Hulk.

He was portrayed by P.J. Kerr in a cameo in the 2008 Marvel Cinematic Universe film The Incredible Hulk.

== Publication history ==
Created by Roy Thomas and Herb Trimpe, the character made his first appearance in The Incredible Hulk (vol. 2) #131 (September 1970) as an angry young man who befriends the Hulk. During the late 1970s, he became a regular supporting character of the series, usually appearing as a friend of Bruce Banner. He was a replacement for Rick Jones, who had become Captain Marvel's sidekick.

In The Incredible Hulk #232 (February 1979), it is revealed that Jim Wilson is the nephew of Sam Wilson, the superhero Falcon. Though this revelation occurred when Roger Stern was writing the series, Stern says that earlier Incredible Hulk writer Len Wein came up with the idea that they were related and did not address it during his run.

Wilson was dropped from the series by 1980, and did not return until The Incredible Hulk Vol. 2 #388 (December 1991), in which it is revealed that Wilson was HIV-positive. He dies of complications from AIDS in The Incredible Hulk Vol. 2 #420 (August 1994).

== Fictional character biography ==
James "Jim" Wilson grew up in Harlem and wanted to travel where he was often at odds with his father Gideon Wilson who worked as a Catholic minister. Wilson enlists Rick Jones to play a benefit concert at a hospice for AIDS patients. On the drive from the airport, Wilson reveals to Jones that he is HIV-positive and that his girlfriend left him. Wilson is injured while protecting Jefferson Wolfe from the assassin Speedfreek at the charity concert. Hulk rushes Wilson to a hospital. Jones and Hulk later secure evidence to send the mob boss who employed Speedfreek to prison.

Wilson is again seen in The Incredible Hulk #420 (August 1994), in which he is attacked by a mob protesting the fact that a court has ordered an HIV-infected boy to be allowed into a public school. This is an analogy to Ryan White, where parents and teachers in Howard County, Indiana, lobbied against his school attendance before he died in April 1990. Hulk rescues Wilson from the mob and takes him to the Mount, the secret headquarters of the Pantheon. He learns that Wilson has Pneumocystis pneumonia and does not have long to live. Remembering the blood transfusion that the Hulk gave his cousin Jennifer Walters, which turned her into She-Hulk, Wilson asks Bruce Banner to give him a transfusion of his blood, which he hopes will cure him. Banner initially refuses to take the risk of creating another monster, but eventually pretends to give Wilson a blood transfusion. Wilson reveals in private to Dr. Harr, the physician caring for him, that he was not fooled by Banner's ruse, but played along anyway. Shortly afterward, Wilson succumbs to the disease and dies. Following this, Banner donates money to the hospice that Wilson worked at to allow them to comfortably exist for the next few decades.

Gideon Wilson inexplicably blames the Hulk for Jim's death and joins Gamma Corps to seek revenge. However, he ultimately admits to himself and the Hulk that he only blamed the Hulk for his son's death to avoid facing his guilt for his failures as a father.

== In other media ==
Jim Wilson appears in The Incredible Hulk, portrayed by P.J. Kerr.
