= John Ryker =

Fictional comic book character

General John Ryker

Publication information
- Publisher: Marvel Comics
- First appearance: The Incredible Hulk (vol. 3) #12 (March 2000)
- Created by: Paul Jenkins; Ron Garney; Mike McKone

In-story information
- Full name: John Ryker
- Species: Human
- Team affiliations: Gamma Corps; Origins Corporation
- Abilities: Genius strategist Master manipulator Adept deceiver

General John Ryker is a fictional character appearing in American comic books published by Marvel Comics. He is depicted as an enemy of the Hulk.

== Publication history ==
Created by writer Paul Jenkins and artists Ron Garney and Mike McKone, John Ryker first appeared in The Incredible Hulk Vol. 3 #12 (March 2000).

== Fictional character biography ==
John Ryker is a corrupt U.S. Army general who joined the military at a young age and wanted to help determine future history from the shadows. One of his most prominent actions was manipulating the creation of the conspiracy around John F. Kennedy's assassination where apparently two Corsican mercenaries were the killers, but at the time was deemed too expensive to wage World War III, so the idea of a conspiracy was created. When his wife Lucy Ryker developed cancer, Ryker used the military to hunt down Bruce Banner, who turned into the Hulk after gamma radiation exposure during a nuclear test that Ryker supervised. Ryker initially irradiated various subjects to try and duplicate the same accident behind the Hulk, with the goal of allowing him to isolate Hulk's ability to cope with the radiation and use it to heal his wife. His closest success was Benjamin Tibbits, who was transformed into Flux and used as a near-mindless soldier against the Hulk. However, his brutal treatment of the Hulk not only broke down the Hulk's other personalities' mental barriers from taking control, including the Devil Hulk, but also convinced General Thunderbolt Ross to turn against Ryker and free their long-time enemy. Taking Lucy hostage, Ross told the truth to Lucy, prompting Ryker to depart as Lucy coldly told him that Lucy did not ask to be healed at the cost of innocent people.

Ryker is responsible for the special Gamma Corps military unit that dealt with the Hulk. He is spurred into action after his wife (who seemed to have been cured by a transfusion of the Hulk's blood) dies from a sudden resurgence of cancer. His Hulkbuster unit is unable to stop the Hulk and causes his subordinate Grey to lose his temper, destroying Ryker's base with him inside.

Ryker later reappears as the CEO of Origins Corporation, which specializes in giving average people superpowers through gene therapy. He sends the new Gamma Corps: Black unit under Norman Osborn's auspices to harvest the new She-Hulk's DNA.

== Skills and abilities ==
General John Ryker has no superpowers, but he is a genius strategist and master manipulator, as well as an adept deceiver.

== Other versions ==
The Ultimate Marvel universe's version of Ryker appears as a leading member of Project Pegasus.

== In other media ==
John Ryker appears as a non-playable character in Hulk (2003), voiced by Jano Frandsen.
