= Glenn Talbot =

Fictional character appearing in Marvel Comics

- Glenn Talbot

Publication information
- Publisher: Marvel Comics
- First appearance: Tales to Astonish #61 (November 1964)
- Created by: Stan Lee (writer); Steve Ditko (artist)

In-story information
- Full name: Glenn Talbot
- Species: Human
- Place of origin: Earth
- Team affiliations: United States Air Force; United States Army; Hydra

Major (later Colonel) Glenn Talbot is a fictional character appearing in American comic books published by Marvel Comics. Created by writer Stan Lee and artist Steve Ditko, he first appeared in Tales to Astonish #61 (November 1964).

He is a close compatriot to General Thaddeus Ross and an active participant in his operations to capture or kill the Hulk. His most significant blow is discovering and informing his superiors that Bruce Banner physically transformed into the Hulk, which made the scientist a wanted fugitive. Initially, Talbot was consistently portrayed as a courageous, resourceful, and fiercely patriotic man who puts the good of his country before all else. He is romantically attracted to Betty Ross, who is in love with Bruce Banner, which adds fuel to his enmity for the Hulk. Though Talbot was mostly used as a romantic rival and general adversary for Banner, the two sometimes worked together to battle greater menaces. Eventually, the character came to be portrayed as unsympathetic in his obsession with destroying the Hulk, and was embittered by the failure of his relationship with Betty Ross.

The character has appeared in various media adaptations, including novels, video games, animated films and TV series. In the 2003 film Hulk, he was portrayed by Josh Lucas, while Adrian Pasdar portrayed him in the Marvel Cinematic Universe television series Agents of S.H.I.E.L.D. In the latter series, he is an adversary and later begrudging ally to S.H.I.E.L.D. before becoming the show's version of Graviton.

== Publication history ==
Glenn Talbot was created by Stan Lee and Steve Ditko in 1964 and first appeared in Tales to Astonish #61. He was a key character in the series' long-running story arc in which Bruce Banner/Hulk is suspected of being a communist traitor, and remained a part of the Hulk's supporting cast after Tales to Astonish was renamed The Incredible Hulk.

== Fictional character biography ==
Glenn Talbot was a career military man. When Thunderbolt Ross contacts the Pentagon to investigate Bruce Banner, Talbot is put in charge of reviewing whether or not such an investigation is merited. After two weeks studying records of Banner's career, Talbot concludes that Ross' suspicions that Banner is a traitor are well-founded, and reports this to the Pentagon. The Pentagon responds by appointing Talbot security chief for Gamma Base, where Ross is the commanding officer. While reporting for duty to Ross, Talbot meets Ross's daughter Betty Ross, who is in love with Banner. He is immediately attracted to her and tries to court her without losing focus on his investigation of Banner, which Thunderbolt Ross encourages.

Talbot's suspicions of Banner are heightened when, upon Talbot's arrival at the base, Banner mysteriously goes missing in the hills nearby. When Banner disappears with the vital Absorbatron, orders are given to shoot him on sight, and Banner is apparently killed by a soldier. At Talbot's suggestion, the Hulk's frequent companion Rick Jones is taken into custody and confesses to Talbot that Banner is the Hulk.

Subsequently, the Hulk is found still alive, and is captured using a plan devised and orchestrated by Talbot. However, Hulk is freed by traitor Konrad Zaxon. Talbot later faces down Boomerang, preventing the villain from stealing the army's Orion Missile and sustaining a shrapnel wound. Despite this, Talbot is unable to convince Betty to relinquish her feelings for Banner, and he continually hopes that the army will be forced to kill Hulk, so that Betty will eventually forget him. Talbot finally succeeds and marries Betty, still attempting to keep her away from Banner and the Hulk.

Talbot takes a leave from Gamma Base and soon divorces Betty, who later admits to Rick Jones that she had never stopped loving Bruce Banner. Talbot continued battling the Hulk and tried to have Banner court-martialed. When Thunderbolt Ross has a breakdown, Talbot is promoted to Colonel. Later on, Hulk storms Gamma Base looking for his deceased love Jarella, who has been placed in cryogenic storage. Soon afterward, Congress cuts funds from Gamma Base and Talbot decides once and for all to stop the Hulk by using the War Wagon. However, he is killed in battle.

During an attempted coup d'état of Washington, D.C., Talbot appears on national television as part of the Intelligencia's plan to seize control. However, he is decapitated by Red Hulk and revealed to be a Life Model Decoy, a robotic imposter. The Decoy had believed itself to be Talbot, complete with his memories.

== Family ==
Since his "death", two of Talbot's relatives have also appeared. He has a younger brother named Brian Talbot who was a member of the Gamma Corps as Grey (who sports the DNA of Hulk and Leader). Trained in martial arts. The Leader DNA does not make Grey as smart as Prodigy but he has a brilliant military strategist and it seems to have been meant as a way to prevent him from losing control. Brian was often bullied and beaten by his older brother and had actually been delighted to hear of his death. He claimed he joined the Gamma Corps because the Hulk was dangerous but really it was to do what Glenn could not - destroy the Hulk.

Talbot also has a nephew named Matt Talbot, who is also a member of the military.

== Other versions ==
In the alternate reality depicted in the 2005 House of M storyline, Glenn Talbot is married to Betty Ross.

In Ultimate Marvel universe, a version of Talbot appeared in Ultimate Fantastic Four as General Talbot. Talbot is portrayed as a colleague and friend to General Ross, and operates in the Baxter Building's think tank.

== In other media ==
=== Television ===
- Glenn Talbot appears in The Marvel Super Heroes, voiced by John Vernon.
- A character based on Glenn Talbot named Ned Talbot appears in The Incredible Hulk (1982), voiced by Pat Fraley.
- Glenn Talbot appears in The Incredible Hulk (1996), voiced by Kevin Schon. This version serves as Thunderbolt Ross' right-hand man and displays a romantic interest in his daughter Betty Ross, though she always rejects him in part because of his inability to hide his disdain for Bruce Banner and the Hulk. After an encounter with the Ghost Rider, Talbot reflects on his negative personality traits and becomes more serious and selfless.
- Glenn Talbot appears in The Avengers: Earth's Mightiest Heroes episode "Nightmare in Red", voiced by Troy Baker. This version is a colonel and member of General Thunderbolt Ross' Hulkbusters unit.
- Glenn Talbot appears in the Iron Man: Armored Adventures episode "Rage of the Hulk" as a member of S.H.I.E.L.D. under Thunderbolt Ross' command.
- Glenn Talbot appears in Agents of S.H.I.E.L.D., portrayed by Adrian Pasdar. This version is initially a colonel before being promoted to brigadier general for his efforts in bringing down S.H.I.E.L.D.'s remnants after the organization was compromised by Hydra. (Note: As depicted in the film Captain America: The Winter Soldier.) In the second and third seasons, he gradually forms a begrudging relationship with a rebuilt, underground S.H.I.E.L.D. led by Phil Coulson before becoming the head of the Advanced Threat Containment Unit (ATCU), the President's front organization. In the fifth season, Talbot is hypnotized by Hydra sleeper agent General Hale and forced to reveal S.H.I.E.L.D.'s location to Hydra. A guilt-ridden Talbot subsequently infuses himself with the gravity-manipulating substance gravitonium and becomes Graviton. The gravitonium's power exacerbates Talbot's preexisting mental instability, causing him to develop extreme megalomania and a messiah complex. As a result, he forces his way into the alien Confederacy and uses them to find more gravitonium, enhance his power further, and unilaterally protect Earth from Thanos. Eventually, Talbot is killed by Johnson, who pushes him into outer space.

=== Film ===
Glenn Talbot appears in Hulk (2003), portrayed by Josh Lucas. This version is a former military officer-turned-bio-science executive at a Defense Department contractor called Atheon. He seeks to obtain a tissue sample from the Hulk for military supersoldier-based applications, only to be injured at Banner's house. During the Hulk's escape from Desert Base, Talbot fires a missile at the Hulk, which ricochets off of his skin, killing Talbot in the ensuing explosion.

=== Video games ===
Glenn Talbot appears as a boss in The Incredible Hulk (2008), voiced by Michael Gannon. This version views both Bruce Banner and the Hulk as threats to mankind. Later in the game, his actions against them escalate to the point where Talbot himself becomes a danger to civilian safety, with his strategies varying from attempting to launch missiles in a civilian area to destroy the Hulk to kidnapping Betty Ross and donning a nuclear-powered Hulkbuster suit to fight the Hulk directly; intending to pass off civilian casualties as the Hulk's fault once his foe has been dealt with. When he is defeated, Talbot activates his suit's self-destruct mechanism to kill the Hulk along with himself and an entire city. However, the Hulk throws Talbot's suit into the upper atmosphere, where it explodes safely, killing Talbot.

=== Miscellaneous ===
Glenn Talbot's nephew Major William Talbot appears in the novel The Incredible Hulk: What Savage Beast, written by Peter David. This version is the leader of the Hulkbusters.
