= Thundra =

Fictional character appearing in American comic books published by Marvel Comics

- Cover art for Hulk: Raging Thunder #1. Art by Greg Land.

Publication information
- Publisher: Marvel Comics
- First appearance: Fantastic Four #129 (December 1972)
- Created by: Roy Thomas (Writer); John Buscema (Artist)

In-story information
- Alter ego: Thundra
- Species: Femizon
- Place of origin: Femizonia
- Team affiliations: Lady Liberators; Frightful Four; Grapplers; Roxxon Oil
- Abilities: Vast superhuman strength and resistance to injury Peak level speed, agility, stamina, and reflexes Superior hand to hand combatant Carries a sword and a three-foot linked chain as weapons

Thundra is a fictional character appearing in American comic books published by Marvel Comics. She is often aligned with the Fantastic Four. She is a powerful, red haired, amazon-like warrior, or Femizon, from a matriarchal, technologically advanced future timeline where men have been subjugated by women.

== Publication history ==
Thundra was created by Roy Thomas and John Buscema, and first appeared in Fantastic Four #129.

Roy Thomas recalled the character's creation, "A 7-foot Amazon type that I conceived as an homage of sorts to characters like Kirby's Big Barda in his Fourth World by DC Comics. I asked John Buscema to give her a bandolier around her torso because a number of women's-lib types were wearing them (sometimes with real bullets) in photos in newspapers and magazines."

== Fictional character biography ==
Thundra clobbers the Thing. Art by John Byrne and Terry Austin.

Thundra is a warrior woman and time traveler from the 23rd century on Earth-715. In her timeline, Earth is now known as Femizonia and is ruled by Amazon-like overlords (Femizons) who have enslaved Earth's men. Thundra hails from the megalopolis of Greater Milago (a merged sprawl of Milwaukee and Chicago). Thundra is renowned as the United Sisterhood's most formidable warrior, having been physically enhanced by genetic engineering and trained in combat and tactics from a young age.

Thundra is sent to the 20th century to challenge Fantastic Four member the Thing to a bout of one-on-one combat, believing him to be the strongest male of all time. By beating the Thing in combat, she feels she can prove once and for all that women were superior to the male gender, and finally end a stagnant war between Femizonia and the male-dominated planet of Machus.

Thundra is recruited into the Frightful Four, enemies of the Fantastic Four. She secretly has her own agenda and has no real interest in the group. She battled the Thing in personal combat, and then wound up ultimately switching sides and helping the Fantastic Four defeat the Frightful Four after she quits the group.

Thundra later met wrestling promoter Herkimer Oglethorpe, and on his advice she became a professional wrestler training with the Grapplers, a group of wrestlers. In a fixed wrestling match with one Grappler member, Thundra is secretly drugged by her opponent, causing her to black out and lose the match. When she awakens, it was revealed that the Grapplers had been working for Roxxon, a petroleum company which was covertly involved in developing advanced technology and weaponry. The Grapplers trick Thundra into helping them sabotage Project Pegasus, a prison/research facility.

=== Secret Invasion: Inhumans ===
Medusa and Crystal infiltrate Thundra's present-day homeland to retrieve part of a device required to rescue Black Bolt from the Skrulls. As tensions between the two disguised women boil over, Thundra appears and compels them to undertake the ritual combat required of the society to resolve the disagreement. Thundra is convinced to hand over the Skrull intelligence agent after Crystal makes an impassioned speech.

=== Alliance with the Red Hulk ===
The Red Hulk battles the Lady Liberators and tricks them into believing they caused him to pass out. Red Hulk then kidnaps Thundra, and offers her an alliance after deducing she was the only one of the group that was willing to kill him. After agreeing to the alliance, Thundra becomes a subordinate of the Intelligencia, a group of genius villains founded by Leader. After Red Hulk is betrayed by the Intelligencia in the "Fall of the Hulks" storyline, Thundra aids him in his escape and leaves the group.

== Powers and abilities ==
As a result of genetic engineering, Thundra has superhuman strength and resistance to physical injury. Her speed, stamina, agility, and reflexes are heightened to the peak of natural human capability. She has undergone intensive pain-management training.

Trained as a warrior, with extensive training in the hand-to-hand and military combat techniques of the 23rd century, she is a seasoned combat veteran who possesses superior fighting skills and is considered to be the greatest warrior among her people. Thundra is also a skilled combatant with a sword or her three-foot linked chain, the latter of which is her weapon of choice, often attached to a bracelet on her left forearm.

== Other versions ==
=== Avengers Forever ===
An alternate timeline version of Thundra appears in Avengers Forever as a member of the Avengers.

=== Hulk: Raging Thunder ===
A possible future version of Thundra appears in Hulk: Raging Thunder and Fall of the Hulks: Red Hulk. This version was captured by scientists, who impregnated her with cell scrapings from the Hulk. Thundra later gives birth to a daughter named Lyra, who would go on to become the new She-Hulk.

=== Marvel Zombies: Return ===
A zombified alternate universe version of Thundra from Earth-91126 appears in Marvel Zombies Return #5.

== Reception ==
Thundra was ranked 62nd in Comics Buyer's Guide's "100 Sexiest Women in Comics" list.

== In other media ==
=== Television ===
Thundra appears in Ultimate Spider-Man, voiced by Tara Strong. This version is a member of the Frightful Four.

=== Video games ===
- Thundra appears as a playable character in Marvel: Avengers Alliance.
- Thundra appears in Marvel: War of Heroes.

=== Merchandise ===
Thundra received an action figure in Hasbro's Marvel Legends line.

== See also ==
- Women warriors in literature and culture
