= Jarella =

- Jarella as depicted in Marvel Universe Deluxe Edition #18. Art by Sandy Plunkett.

Publication information
- Publisher: Marvel Comics
- First appearance: The Incredible Hulk (vol. 2) #140 (June 1971)
- Created by: Harlan Ellison; Roy Thomas; Herb Trimpe

In-story information
- Place of origin: K'ai
- Supporting character of: Hulk
- Abilities: Skilled swordfighter, strategist and equestrian Superhuman physical prowess Rides horse-like steeds and winged serpent-creatures

Jarella is a fictional character appearing in American comic books published by Marvel Comics. Along with Betty Ross and Caiera, she was one of the Hulk's great loves. The character was introduced in The Incredible Hulk (vol. 2) #140 (May 1971), and was created by Roy Thomas, Herb Trimpe, and guest writer Harlan Ellison.

== Publication history ==
Jarella first appeared in The Incredible Hulk (vol. 2) #140 (June 1971) as a one-off character in a plot by guest writer Harlan Ellison. She was brought back in issue #148, another tale by a guest plotter, in this case Chris Claremont in his first published story. Though Jarella's appearances would continue to be sporadic, she became a major driving force in the plot and characterization of the Hulk for several years.

Jarella is killed in The Incredible Hulk (vol. 2) #205 (November 1976). Though it sparked an outpouring of protest from readers who shared the Hulk's grief, writer Len Wein has said that he never intended Jarella's death to be permanent: "[It] was my intention that Jarella was not really dead. Being an alien species, what appeared to be death to us was in fact a step in what was to be her metamorphosis into a higher power. I never got a chance to bring her back before I left the title, and thus she's remained dead".

== Fictional character biography ==
Jarella was the princess of the sub-atomic world of K'ai. Although outwardly primitive, her world has remnants of long-forgotten high technology and sorcery. Its people are green-skinned and for the most part blonde haired, but otherwise humanoid.

Jarella's city is threatened by a number of menaces ranging from attacks by warthos (large warthog-like beasts) to the armies of the warlord Visus. The Hulk appears in K'ai during an attack of the warthos and drives the huge monsters away. The people come out to greet him, and the Hulk is especially taken with Jarella. She leads him into the city and calls on her sorcerers to help the Hulk learn their language. The spell succeeds and also allows the human personality of Bruce Banner to control Hulk's body. The Hulk and Jarella fall in love and she proclaims him her husband. After Visus attempts to assassinate Jarella, she exiles him from the city. However, Psyklop snatches the Hulk away from K'ai.

Jarella is soon transported to Earth by the Pantheon of Sorcerers (Torla, Holi, Moli; also known as the Sorcerer's Triad) to retrieve the Hulk. This act inadvertently causes solar storms; she battles Fialin and then returns to K'ai. She loses another war against Visi and is taken captive. The Hulk returns to K'ai, and Jarella and Hulk defeat Visis and the assassin Krylar.

Jarella accepts the Hulk unconditionally. She realizes that Bruce Banner's mind is in the Hulk's body but is equally accepting of the Hulk personality, or Banner's body.

Alongside the Hulk, Jarella battles Psyklop once more. Hulk and Jarella are returned to Earth by Doc Samson. During a battle between the Hulk and Crypto-Man in New Mexico, Jarella saves a child from a collapsing wall, but is crushed to death. The Hulk rampages searching for Doctor Strange, but he is unable to resurrect her, and Hulk finally accepts that Jarella is dead. Mar-Vell shrinks Hulk so that he can return Jarella to K'ai for a proper burial.

In the Chaos War event, Jarella is temporarily resurrected to assist the Hulk in fighting Abomination, a Zom-possessed Doctor Strange, and Amatsu-Mikaboshi.

== Powers and abilities ==
Jarella was athletic with the strength of a normal human but was a skilled sword-fighter, strategist and equestrian. She would ride horse-like steeds and winged serpent-creatures indigenous to K'ai.

After her death, she was empowered by all the positive feelings that Hulk had felt towards her, and as he drew his power from emotions, she gained superhuman strength exceeding his regular state.

== Reception ==
The character was ranked 68th in Comics Buyer's Guide's "100 Sexiest Women in Comics" list.
