= Zzzax =

Marvel comics villain

- Zzzax battles the Hulk on the cover of The Incredible Hulk (vol. 2) #183 (January 1975), art by Herb Trimpe

Publication information
- Publisher: Marvel Comics
- First appearance: The Incredible Hulk (vol. 2) #166 (August 1973)
- Created by: Steve Englehart; Herb Trimpe

In-story information
- Abilities: Flight; Electromagnetism and motor-skill manipulation

Zzzax is a fictional character appearing in American comic books published by Marvel Comics. The character first appeared in The Incredible Hulk (vol. 2) #166 (August 1973), and was created by Steve Englehart and Herb Trimpe.

In-universe, Zzzax was created by accident during a terrorist act. Zzzax is a being of pure electricity who can absorb and discharge powerful currents of electricity. Its size and strength depend on the amount of electricity absorbed. It can also absorb human brain energy, temporarily taking on the personality of the victim.

== Fictional character biography ==
Debuting in the title The Incredible Hulk, Zzzax is a humanoid creature formed from electricity by an act of sabotage at a Consolidated Edison nuclear power plant in New York City. An explosion from their stray gunfire starts a chain reaction in the reactor, creating an electromagnetic field. As the field grows, it incinerates those that stand in its path and absorbs the electric energy from their brains, gaining a humanoid form and sentience. Calling itself Zzzax after the crackling noises emitted by its movement, it goes on a destructive murder spree to further increase its intelligence. The entity fights the Hulk and Hawkeye before being defeated.

Zzzax returns and attacks a research center in Chicago. The Hulk battles the entity to a standstill before several scientists shut down the process that recreates Zzzax. Zzzax reappears in Luke Cage, Power Man, and hunts down the men responsible for its last defeat. Power Man defeats the entity, but not before it kills one of the scientists. Zzzax returns to confront an intelligent version of the Hulk who retains the mind of Bruce Banner, but is quickly defeated. In the title West Coast Avengers, Zzzax teams with villains Graviton, Quantum, and Halflife, who all have power over one fundamental force, but is again short-circuited by Hawkeye.

S.H.I.E.L.D. ter captures Zzzax and transports it to Gamma Base. Thunderbolt Ross arranges for his mind to be transferred into Zzzax's body and battles Rick Jones, who has transformed into a new version of the Hulk. Ross relinquishes control of the entity after saving his daughter Betty, realizing that his actions had risked lives.

Zzzax reappears in the title New Avengers and participates in the mass escape by supervillains from the Raft. The title Sensational She-Hulk reveals Zzzax has been contained by S.H.I.E.L.D. After briefly escaping and turning the defense systems of the Helicarrier against its agents, it is recaptured by She-Hulk.

== Powers and abilities ==
As a being of pure electricity, Zzzax is able to absorb and generate electrical fields, as well as manipulate nearby equipment. It can grow its own intelligence by draining the energy from human brainwaves, thus becoming dependent upon them. While incinerating the victim, it would temporarily take on his or her personality traits. This extends control to their nervous systems via electric currents. Only its foe, the Hulk has proven unaffected by this ability. Zzzax's size and strength increases in direct quality for the electricity it needs to feed. It is also capable of hovering. Zzzax is vulnerable to water, which can short-circuit or evaporate it.

== In other media ==
=== Television ===
- Zzzax appears in The Incredible Hulk episode "Raw Power", simultaneously voiced by Michael Bell, Leeza Miller McGee, and Kevin Schon. This version was originally Mitch McCutcheon, a nuclear power plant worker who attempts to aid Bruce Banner in curing himself of the Hulk before being accidentally and temporarily turned into Zzzax after they are interrupted by security guards. Driven insane by the transformation, McCutcheon attempts to siphon energy to maintain his form until he is cured following a fight with the Hulk.
- Zzzax appears in The Super Hero Squad Show, voiced by Jonathan Mankuta. This version is a member of Doctor Doom's Lethal Legion.
- Zzzax appears in The Avengers: Earth's Mightiest Heroes.
- Zzzax appears in Ultimate Spider-Man, voiced by Dee Bradley Baker. This version possesses the additional ability to increase in size by absorbing energy, though this has a limit that will harm it if exceeded.
- Zzzax appears in the Avengers Assemble episode "All-Father's Day".

=== Film ===
Zzzax appears in Heroes United: Iron Man & Hulk, voiced by Dee Bradley Baker. This version was created by Hydra scientists Dr. Cruler and Dr. Fump.

=== Video games ===
Zzzax appears in Marvel Avengers Alliance.
