= Abomination (character) =

Marvel Comics supervillain

- Abomination, as the character appeared on the variant cover of Bring on the Bad Guys: Abomination #1 (July 2025). Art by Todd Nauck.

Publication information
- Publisher: Marvel Comics
- First appearance: Tales to Astonish #90 (April 1967)
- Created by: Stan Lee; Gil Kane

In-story information
- Alter ego: Emil Blonsky
- Species: Human mutate
- Team affiliations: KGB; A.I.M. Legion Accursed; Masters of Evil; Lethal Legion; Thunderbolts
- Partnerships: Leader
- Notable aliases: Agent R-7; The Ravager of Worlds; Subject B
- Abilities: Superhuman strength, stamina, durability, speed, and senses; Regeneration; Underwater breathing; Gamma energy control

The Abomination (Emil Blonsky) is a character appearing in American comic books published by Marvel Comics. Created by writer Stan Lee and artist Gil Kane, the character first appeared in Tales to Astonish #90 (April 1967). A former KGB agent, Emil Blonsky was exposed to gamma radiation while spying on the military base where Bruce Banner was attempting to rid himself of the Hulk, and developed similar powers as a result. He has since endured as one of the Hulk's most prominent adversaries and one of his greatest physical threats.

Debuting during the Silver Age of Comic Books, the character has been featured in other Marvel-endorsed products such as arcade and video games, television series, and merchandise such as action figures and trading cards. Tim Roth portrays Emil Blonsky in the live-action Marvel Cinematic Universe (MCU) films The Incredible Hulk (2008) and Shang-Chi and the Legend of the Ten Rings (2021), as well as the Disney+ series She-Hulk: Attorney at Law (2022).

== Publication history ==
Stan Lee chose the name "the Abomination", which he realized belonged to no other character, before conceiving the character's background and appearance. Lee recalled that he simply told the artist Gil Kane to "make him bigger and stronger than the Hulk and we'll have a lot of fun with him".

Emil Blonsky first appeared in Tales to Astonish, and was introduced as a KGB agent and spy who became the Abomination after deliberately exposing himself to a greater quantity of the same gamma radiation that transformed Bruce Banner into his alter ego the Hulk, using a machine Banner was planning on using to commit suicide. In his first appearance, Blonsky became a large scaly humanoid even stronger than the Hulk. In accordance with Lee's wishes, the character defeated the Hulk in their first battle.

The character has been featured in a number of Marvel titles, gradually shifting from unthinking, savage brute, to master schemer, to tortured soul, and finally repentant villain and occasional defender of the weak, before being killed by the Red Hulk in Hulk (vol. 2), released in 2008. He is later resurrected in Hulk (vol. 3), released in 2014.

== Fictional character biography ==
Emil Blonsky was born in Zagreb (then part of Yugoslavia, now the capital and largest city of Croatia) and became a KGB agent who infiltrated an Air Force base in New Mexico where Bruce Banner was attempting to kill the Hulk through overexposure to gamma rays. Blonsky triggers Banner turning into the Hulk and is transformed by exposure to the radiation, becoming a hideous lizard-like creature himself.

The Abomination reappears when summoned by a coven of witches to briefly battle the cosmic hero the Silver Surfer and uses the Stranger's technology to summon Thor and escape the Stranger's laboratory world. Thor frees the Abomination and the other captives, but, on discovering they are all evil, uses his mystic hammer Mjolnir to time travel several hours into the past to undo his mistake. After defeating the Abomination and placing the Abomination in prison, Thor departs. When the Hulk is defeated by the alien Xeron the Star Slayer and brought aboard a space vessel, the Abomination is revealed to be First Mate of the alien crew. When the captain of the vessel directs Xeron and the crew to battle a creature in space, the Hulk and the Abomination are thrown from the vessel and battle until the pair are drawn into Earth's orbit and separated.

It is revealed in flashback that the Abomination entered into a coma-like state upon impacting with Earth and is buried for two years. Revived by an off-course missile fired from Hulkbuster Base (under Thunderbolt Ross's jurisdiction), the Abomination joins forces with Ross to defeat the Hulk, but is battered into submission by an angered Hulk. The Abomination reappears with fellow Hulk foe the Rhino, and the pair activates a gamma bomb at the Hulkbuster base in an attempt to destroy the Hulk. The Hulk's companion of the time, Jim Wilson, deactivates the bomb and the Hulk tricks the villains during combat, forcing them to collide and knock each other unconscious. A comatose Abomination is eventually found by soldiers at Ross's direction and has a miniature bomb implanted in his skull, being told to fight and defeat the Hulk or be killed. The Abomination tricks the Hulk into an alliance and betrays Ross by attempting to ransom the Kennedy Space Center. The plan fails when the Hulk turns on the Abomination and the pair fight, with the Abomination being caught on a rocket when it explodes.

The Abomination eventually reappears as a servant of the Galaxy Master, having been empowered with even greater strength. After another extended battle with the Hulk, the Hulk attacks and destroys the Galaxy Master, causing the Abomination to weaken and apparently become lost in space. When MODOK invades Hulkbuster Base, he colludes with Ross to revive the Abomination, who was found in a block of ice above Earth and kept in cryogenic storage for further study. MODOK intends to use the Abomination against his superiors at A.I.M., while Ross wants to use him to destroy the Hulk. The Abomination, however, has become afraid of the Hulk as a result of their past battles and has to be mentally forced by MODOK to even fight the Hulk. MODOK, however, is ousted by A.I.M., and a hesitant Abomination is beaten by the Hulk when he intervenes to save Banner's laboratory assistant. The Abomination refuses to rejoin the fight, and is disintegrated by MODOK.

During the Secret Wars II storyline, the Abomination is restored by the demon-lord Mephisto, who directs the Abomination and other villains against the cosmic entity the Beyonder as a member of the Legion Accursed. The restoration is temporary, as a still-disembodied Abomination's atoms mingle with the disembodied atoms of the villain Tyrannus, who reintegrates the Abomination's body and places it under his mind's control. Tyrannus, as the Abomination, then comes into conflict with the Gray Hulk, and quickly defeats the weaker version of their foe. When the Hulk reverts to Banner, Tyrannus forces him to create a procedure that will remove Blonsky's mind, who is mentally fighting Tyrannus' mind for control of the Abomination's body. The process is successful and Blonsky is restored to his human form, free of Tyrannus, whose mind is still occupying the form of the Abomination. An enraged Gray Hulk defeats Tyrannus, who is placed into custody by the organization S.H.I.E.L.D.

After encounters against Avengers Wonder Man and Hawkeye, the Tyrannus-controlled Abomination reappears during the "Atlantis Attacks" storyline with the Deviant Ghaur freeing Tyrannus from the body of the Abomination by restoring Tyrannus' mind to a duplicate of his own body and placing Blonsky's mind within the Abomination's body once more. The process drives Blonsky insane, and he battles heroes Spider-Man and the She-Hulk, managing to knock both unconscious. The Abomination is eventually driven off when set on fire by the She-Hulk. The Abomination's mental faculties eventually return and the Abomination reappears in the "Countdown" storyline as a pawn of another Hulk foe, the Leader. The Abomination is sent to a toxic waste site to collect samples and encounters the gray version of the Hulk again, who is outmatched and also weak due to being poisoned. The Hulk, however, throws the Abomination into toxic waste that partially dissolves and horribly scars the Abomination.

The Abomination temporarily teams with villains Titania and Gargantua and finds and stalks his former wife Nadia. The Abomination captures her and after taking her into the New York City sewers, reveals his true identity. After a brief skirmish, the Hulk persuades the Abomination to free his wife.

After befriending a woman who finds her way into the sewers, the Abomination battles Namor during an attempt to save his kidnapped former wife. The Abomination retaliates against the NYPD when the Police Commissioner orders the sewers be cleared of all homeless, who the Abomination has placed under his protection. After killing several police officers, he is eventually driven away when confronted by the Hulk. The Abomination battles the mutant Nate Grey (who is searching the sewers for his lover and fellow mutant Threnody, who had been one of the homeless followers of the Abomination), who uses his mental abilities to trick the Abomination in thinking that he defeated Grey. He battles a delusional Hulk before encountering the Angel when the mutant visits the sewers in which he was once captured and maimed during the "Fall of the Mutants" storyline.

When Betty Ross dies in the title Hulk, Banner mistakenly thinks her proximity to the Hulk has induced a fatal case of radiation poisoning. Using a gamma device, a vindictive Thunderbolt Ross tracks what he believes to be the Hulk to a destroyed town, where the Abomination reveals he was the true culprit. Despite baiting a newly arrived Hulk, the Abomination is unable to force the Hulk to fight and departs.

The circumstances of Betty's death are eventually revealed: Blonsky's transformation into the Abomination apparently alienates his former wife Nadia, driving his hatred of Banner; Blonsky, deciding to deprive Banner of Betty in return, secretly poisons her with his radioactive blood. After hearing the Abomination's admission, Banner eventually discovers the truth and the Hulk defeats the Abomination in a battle. Taken into custody by the military, Blonsky is forced to watch old home movies of him and his wife together prior to his transformation as punishment. Operatives from a secret organization "Home Base" eventually release the Abomination to battle the Hulk, and although able to taunt the Hulk about Betty's murder, he is defeated once again. This encounter is later revealed to be a dream generated by Nightmare in an effort to torture the Hulk.

Blonsky had a humorous encounter with the demigod Hercules, in which he was chosen as an adversary for the hero while he completes the modern version of the 12 Labours of Hercules. The Abomination is also a conflicted opponent for the heroine the She-Hulk (currently employed by the spy organization S.H.I.E.L.D.). The Abomination has a subtle but significant role in the World War Hulk storyline, being the source of gamma-irradiated DNA that allows the creation of an anti-Hulk response team.

The Abomination reappears after the events of World War Hulk, encountering a new foe called the Red Hulk. This new opponent savagely beats, shoots, and kills the Abomination. Later on, it is revealed that Thunderbolt Ross is the Red Hulk and killed Blonsky as an act of revenge for his deliberate gamma poisoning (and later death) of Ross's daughter Betty.

A shadow organization (later revealed to be the Order of the Shield) bent on gaining control of the Hulk harvests biological material from a mortally wounded Bruce Banner. After Banner regains consciousness following the experiment and escapes as the Hulk, the organization uses this material to resurrect the Abomination under their control, leaving him "free of a mind or a conscience" and with an ability to seek out the Hulk for retrieval. The Hulk defeats the Abomination yet again with the aid of the Avengers. Iron Man uses technology taken from the Order of the Shield to teleport the Abomination into space.

Tissue samples of the Abomination were later used by the U.S. Hulk Operations to resurrect Rick Jones, transforming him into an Abomination-like creature dubbed Subject B. After ripping Rick from Subject B's body, Reginald Fortean teleports to Gamma Flight headquarters in space, killing Sasquatch and temporarily killing Doc Samson to retrieve the Subject B husk. Fortean then willingly fuses himself with the body.

After returning to Earth, Abomination started his own company called Green Spring which makes gamma mutates. After finding a depowered Skaar, Abomination had him repowered and sent him to retrieve Stockpile. After Skaar's mission led to an encounter with Gamma Flight and the U.S. Hulkbuster Force, Abomination and Aliana Alba were shown to have watched the fight and commented on the powers of the gamma mutates that was shown off.

During the "Devil's Reign" storyline, Abomination appears as a member of the Thunderbolts and shows up to stop Jessica Jones and the Champions from interfering in the Thunderbolts' apprehension of most of the Purple Children. As Jessica notes that Abomination would not normally be someone to work for Mayor Wilson Fisk, Abomination states that Fisk has the information that he seeks. The recruitment of Abomination was the result of Rhino leaving the group as he crossed the line of hunting children.

== Powers and abilities ==
The Abomination possesses immense superhuman strength, originally stated to be "at least" twice that of the Hulk at the time of his first transformation. His strength is consistent and does not fluctuate with emotion like the Hulk's; this makes him physically stronger than a "calm" or "base" Hulk in most circumstances, and he is described as being in the "100-ton class", like the Hulk. The Abomination is one of the most powerful mortals on Earth, and was once considered by the Hulk himself to be his strongest enemy physically. Blonsky is a longtime enemy of the Hulk who is capable of fighting the Hulk on equal terms (sometimes even overwhelming him on occasion), a feat he did for several years. The Abomination is similar to the Hulk in terms of stamina, speed, and durability, including his healing factor. In contrast with the Hulk, he retains his intellect after transforming and cannot change back into human form. He also possesses gills, enabling him to breathe underwater, and can enter suspended animation at will. Unlike the Hulk, his strength does not increase/decrease in proportion to level of rage.

After being empowered by Amatsu-Mikaboshi, Abomination becomes undead and gains the ability to generate hellfire. Additionally, he can manipulate his gamma energy to poison others.

== Reception ==
=== Critical reception ===
IGN ranked Abomination 54th in their "Top 100 Comic Book Villains" list, writing, "When you have a character built up to be as incredibly (forgive the term) strong as the Hulk, it becomes nearly impossible to give him a credible threat. Enter the Abomination - created, for all intents and purposes, as the evil version of the Hulk," and ranked him 24th in their "Top 25 Marvel Villains" list. Screen Rant included Abomination in their "15 Most Powerful She-Hulk Villains" list, and in their "10 Most Powerful Wonder Man Villains In Marvel Comics" list, and ranked him 3rd in their "Hulk's Main Comic Book Villains, Ranked Lamest To Coolest" list, 4th in their "10 Most Powerful Hulk Villains In Marvel Comics" list. CBR.com ranked Abomination 2nd in their " Definitive Ranking Of The Hulk's 20 Most Powerful Enemies" list, 3rd in their "Hulk's 10 Most Powerful Villains" list, 6th in their "10 Most Violent Marvel Villains" list, and 19th in their "Marvel's 20 Strongest Villains" list.

== Imitators ==
=== Abominatrix ===
The Abominatrix is a female version of Abomination whose real name is Florence Sharples, the manager at Jasper Keaton's savings and loans company. She became the Abominatrix due to a failed medical experiment done by Jasper Keaton's medical facility and fought the She-Hulk.

=== Teen Abomination ===
Teen Abomination is a 13-year-old boy who was exposed to gamma radiation and became a teenage version of the Abomination.

=== Reginald Fortean ===
In The Immortal Hulk, Desert Base director Reginald Fortean accidentally turned himself into another version of the Abomination using the gamma tissue husk/armor of Subject B.

== Other versions ==
Several alternate universe versions of Abomination have appeared throughout the character's publication history.

=== Chrono Corps version ===
In Uncanny Avengers, a version of Abomination who uses Deathlok technology appears as a member of Kang the Conqueror's Chronos Corps.

=== Chrono Signature Anno Doom +128 ===
During the "One World Under Doom" storyline, a possible future version of Abomination appears as a member of the Superior Avengers. This version is a full-armored man whose parents were loyal to Doctor Doom. He is later killed by Kristoff Vernard to defeat the Annihilus variant.

=== Ultimate Marvel ===
In the Ultimate Marvel imprint, Abomination is Chang Lam, a Chinese scientist and member of the Liberators before being killed by the Hulk.

Additionally, Emil Blonsky appears as a member of Nick Fury's Howling Commandos.

== In other media ==
=== Television ===
- The Emil Blonsky incarnation of the Abomination appears in The Incredible Hulk (1996), voiced by Kevin Schon in the pilot episode "Return of the Beast" and subsequently by Richard Moll. This version serves the Leader as one of his prime Gamma Warriors alongside Gargoyle.
- The Emil Blonsky incarnation of the Abomination appears in The Super Hero Squad Show, voiced by Steve Blum. This version is a member of Doctor Doom's Lethal Legion.
- The Emil Blonsky incarnation of the Abomination appears in The Avengers: Earth's Mightiest Heroes, voiced by Robin Atkin Downes. This version is a member of the Masters of Evil.
- The Emil Blonsky incarnation of the Abomination appears in Lego Marvel Super Heroes: Maximum Overload, voiced again by Robin Atkin Downes.
- The Emil Blonsky incarnation of the Abomination appears in Hulk and the Agents of S.M.A.S.H., voiced again by Robin Atkin Downes.
- The Emil Blonsky incarnation of the Abomination appears in Marvel Disk Wars: The Avengers, voiced by Masaya Takatsuka in the Japanese version and again by Robin Atkin Downes in the English dub. This version is a member of the Masters of Evil.
- The Emil Blonsky incarnation of the Abomination appears in the Ultimate Spider-Man episode "Contest of Champions", voiced again by Robin Atkin Downes.
- The Emil Blonsky incarnation of the Abomination makes non-speaking appearances in Avengers Assemble.

=== Film ===
The Emil Blonsky incarnation of the Abomination appears in Iron Man & Hulk: Heroes United, voiced again by Robin Atkin Downes.

=== Marvel Cinematic Universe ===
The Abomination in The Incredible Hulk (2008).

Emil Blonsky appears in media set in the Marvel Cinematic Universe (MCU), portrayed by Tim Roth, who also voices and provides motion capture for the Abomination. Furthermore, JD Hall, JB Blanc, Fred Tatasciore, and Jonathan Lipow provide additional dialogue for the character.

- Introduced in The Incredible Hulk (2008), this version is a Russian British Royal Marine on loan to General Thaddeus Ross's Hulkbuster Unit. Wanting to relive his glory days, Blonsky volunteers to be injected with a sample of an imperfect Super Soldier Serum. While it increases his physical capabilities to superhuman levels, it leaves Blonsky power-hungry and eventually drives him to seek out Dr. Samuel Sterns, who injects with some of Bruce Banner's blood. Mutating into a monstrous "abomination", according to Sterns, Blonsky runs amok, destroying Harlem before he is defeated by the Hulk and handed over to General Ross.
- Blonsky appears in The Consultant via archive footage. S.H.I.E.L.D. agents Phil Coulson and Jasper Sitwell meet to discuss their director, Nick Fury, disagreeing with the World Security Council's attempts to exonerate Blonsky and put him on the Avengers Initiative and formulate a plan to help Fury. At Sitwell's urging, Coulson reluctantly sends in Tony Stark to sabotage the meeting with General Ross, as partially shown in The Incredible Hulk's post-credits scene.
- During an interview in December 2014, Roth revealed that he was offered to reprise his role in Avengers: Age of Ultron, but plans fell through during pre-production.
- Roth provides uncredited vocals for Blonsky in Shang-Chi and the Legend of the Ten Rings. As of this film, Blonsky mutated further, now possessing paler, scaly skin, gills, and webbed ears. As part of his training to become the Sorcerer Supreme, Wong kidnaps Blonsky so they can compete in an underground fight club in Macau. After their fight, he leaves with Wong via a portal and willingly returns to his cell despite being offered freedom.
- Blonsky appears in She-Hulk: Attorney at Law. In the years since his imprisonment, Blonsky has gained control of his Abomination form and opened a self-healing support group called Abomaste to atone for past actions, making him eligible for parole. He becomes a client and friend of Jennifer Walters, who agrees to defend him in court after hearing his plea and receiving Banner's blessing. Despite footage of his fight with Wong being leaked, Blonsky is successfully paroled on the condition that he wear an inhibitor to negate his transformations. He later opens a spiritual retreat called Summer Twilight and violates his parole to attend an Intelligencia event as a motivational speaker. He is arrested and returned to prison, but Wong breaks him out once more and brings him to Kamar-Taj.
- A zombified Abomination appears in Marvel Zombies. Under the control of The Red Queen, he is part of her army during the attack of The North Institute. He is killed by Infinity Hulk in the fourth episode.

=== Video games ===
- The Emil Blonsky incarnation of the Abomination appears as a boss in The Incredible Hulk (1994).
- The Emil Blonsky incarnation of the Abomination appears as the final boss of and an unlockable playable character in The Incredible Hulk: Ultimate Destruction, voiced by Ron Perlman. This version is an NSA director and head of the Division branch who seeks to use Bruce Banner's research to cure his wife Nadia's ovarian cancer. However, he is infected with a vial of Banner's DNA and exposed to gamma radiation, which slowly transforms him into the Abomination throughout the game. When his wife dies, the Abomination blames Bruce for it due to his research and heads for a nearby dam with the intention of destroying it, but is foiled. Refusing to give up, the Abomination smashes the dam apart and disappears in the oncoming flood.
- The Emil Blonsky incarnation of the Abomination appears as the final boss of and an alternate skin for the Hulk in The Incredible Hulk (2008) film tie-in game, with Tim Roth voicing Blonsky while his Abomination form is primarily voiced by Jon Curry, with Jeffrey Parker providing additional sound effects.
- The Emil Blonsky incarnation of the Abomination appears as a boss and an unlockable playable character in Marvel Super Hero Squad, voiced again by Steve Blum.
- The Emil Blonsky incarnation of the Abomination appears as a boss in Marvel Super Hero Squad: The Infinity Gauntlet, voiced again by Steve Blum. Additionally, he is available as an unlockable playable character through the PS3 and Xbox 360 exclusive DLC "Doom on the Loose".
- The Emil Blonsky incarnation of the Abomination appears as a boss and an unlockable character in Marvel Super Hero Squad Online, voiced again by Steve Blum.
- The Emil Blonsky incarnation of the Abomination appears as a boss in Marvel Super Hero Squad: Comic Combat, voiced again by Steve Blum.
- The Emil Blonsky incarnation of the Abomination appears as a boss in Avengers Initiative, voiced again by Steve Blum.
- The Emil Blonsky incarnation of the Abomination appears as a boss and an unlockable playable character in Lego Marvel Super Heroes, voiced again by Steve Blum.
- The Emil Blonsky incarnation of the Abomination appears as an unlockable playable character in Lego Marvel's Avengers.
- The Emil Blonsky incarnation of the Abomination appears as a playable character in Marvel: Future Fight.
- The Emil Blonsky incarnation of the Abomination appears in Marvel Snap.
- The Emil Blonsky incarnation of the Abomination appears as a boss in Marvel's Avengers, voiced by Jamieson Price. This version is a former special forces operative and member of A.I.M. Additionally, several clones of him appear in side missions.

=== Miscellaneous ===
The Emil Blonsky incarnation of the Abomination appears in the Marvel Rising motion comic, voiced by Carlos Alazraqui.

=== Merchandise ===
- The Emil Blonsky incarnation of the Abomination received a figure in Toy Biz's Hulk Classics line.
- The Emil Blonsky incarnation of the Abomination received a figure from the Onslaught Build-A-Figure Wave (Series 13) in the Marvel Legends line. The character also appeared as 2 Build-A-Figures (2016 and 2020) and a figure releasing in January 2026.
- The MCU incarnation of Emil Blonsky / Abomination received a figure in May 2008.
- The Emil Blonsky incarnation of the Abomination appears in Heroscape's Marvel Comics expansion.
- The Emil Blonsky incarnation of the Abomination received a figure in the Marvel Select line.

== See also ==
- List of Hulk supporting characters
