= She-Hulk (Lyra) =

Lyra She-Hulk
- Lyra / She-Hulk. Textless variant cover of Fall of the Hulks: The Savage She-Hulks #1 (March 2010). Art by Jelena Djurdjevic.

Publication information
- Publisher: Marvel Comics
- First appearance: Hulk: Raging Thunder #1 (August 2008)
- Created by: Jeff Parker (writer); Mitch Breitweiser (artist)

In-story information
- Alter ego: Lyra
- Species: Human gamma-mutate / Femizon hybrid
- Place of origin: Earth-8009
- Team affiliations: Avengers Academy; The Sisterhood; Frightful Four; A.R.M.O.R. Defenders
- Notable aliases: Savage She-Hulk; Lyra Walters; She-Hulk
- Abilities: Superhuman strength, speed, agility, stamina, and durability; Immunity to the Venom symbiote; Regenerative healing factor; Great leaping; Expert hand to hand combatant and killer; Knowledge of future tech and history

She-Hulk (Lyra) is a character appearing in American comic books published by Marvel Comics. Created by Jeff Parker and Mitch Breitweiser, the character first appeared in Hulk: Raging Thunder #1 (August 2008). Lyra is an antihero originating from an alternate future of the Marvel Universe's main timeline. She is the daughter of that reality's Thundra and the Marvel Universe's Hulk. The character was also a member of the Defenders and the Avengers Academy at various points during her history.

== Publication history ==
=== 2000s ===
Lyra debuted in the one-shot Hulk: Raging Thunder (August 2008), and was created by writer Jeff Parker and artist Mitch Breitweiser. She later appeared in the 2009 Hulk Family: Green Genes one-shot. She appeared in the solo miniseries All New Savage She-Hulk series, by Fred Van Lente, Robert Q. Atkins, and Peter Vale.

=== 2010s ===
Lyra appeared in the 2010 Avengers Academy series. She later appeared in the 2010 Fall of the Hulks: The Savage She-Hulks series, her second solo comic book series. She appeared in the 2010 She-Hulks: Hunt for the Intelligencia series.

== Fictional character biography ==
Following the failed assassination attempt during which a key component of the male genetic birthing matrix—stolen to replace an identical component of the Femizons' matrix—is destroyed, Lyra is dispatched back in time to the era of Dark Reign on Earth-616 in a last-ditch attempt to prevent the extinction of her people. Assisted by Boudicca, a digital wrist toy reprogrammed with Femizon technology, Lyra begins seeking the greatest hero of the era—by which she inevitably means a man, due to the word's definition male-specific curse in her culture. Due to many of the warring tribes of men having taken former heroes such as Wolverine and Sentry as symbols of worship to continue their war on the Femizons, Lyra hopes that by killing the greatest hero, the men will have nothing to worship and many Femizons will be spared.

She comes into conflict with the original She-Hulk (Jennifer Walters). In this fight, She-Hulk makes references to Thundra and how she looks similar to Lyra, which angers Lyra. It is then discovered that Lyra becomes weaker as she becomes angrier. Before Jennifer can capitalize, Sentry intervenes. Lyra tells Sentry that she is looking for the greatest hero, and the name of that hero is Norman Osborn. When Lyra finally manages to confront him, she reveals that her mission is not to kill him, but to breed with him. Upon kissing him, she recollects all the evil he will be responsible for creating in the future and refuses to go through with it. Osborn and the rest of the Dark Avengers corner Lyra, but Walters rushes to her aid. Both manage to escape by the aid of A.R.M.O.R. Instead of returning to her Earth, Lyra decides to stay and become an agent of A.R.M.O.R.

Lyra seeks out Jennifer Walters, as only she could help her in orientation on Earth-616. However, she is attacked by the Gamma Corps, who were hired by Osborn to capture her and Boudicca to recover incriminating files she stole from Osborn and to gain knowledge of the future that would be beneficial to Osborn. Lyra, however, proves to be too difficult to capture.

After Thundra betrays Intelligencia to aid Red Hulk, Lyra takes her position in the Frightful Four. It is later revealed that Lyra only joined the Frightful Four in hopes of getting information on Jennifer's whereabouts. She finds her in stasis in an Intelligencia base.

Following the events of Fear Itself, Lyra is seen as part of the new class of students when the Avengers Academy moves to the former headquarters of the West Coast Avengers.

After her time at the Avengers Academy, Lyra resurfaces on an environmental crusade against fracking operations by large corporations. The Hulk, now controlled by his Doc Green persona, ambushes Lyra and attempts to defeat her as part of his plan to rid the world of Gamma-powered superhumans. He plans to send her back to her original timeline, but the process is hijacked by Green's A.I., Gammon, who traps Lyra in a hellish alternate dimension. Green's assistants Randall Jessup and Daman Veteri track down Lyra and find that she has formed a peaceful matriarchy, subjugating the male population and even forcing some of them into her harem. The three are accidentally teleported back to Earth-616; Veteri and Jessup agree to become Lyra's servants until they can find a way to get her back to her kingdom.

== Powers and abilities ==
Lyra possesses superhuman strength, which she is able to enhance further through a meditative fighting-trance (that also greatly enhances her sensory perception of her surroundings), as well as superhuman stamina, durability, agility, and speed. She can leap over 600 feet upwards, and 1000 feet across. She also possesses an immunity to the Venom symbiote due to a vaccination injected when she was a child. She is able to feel minute traces of gamma rays in her environment and see the weak points in others. Lyra also has a regenerative healing factor.

Lyra must remain calm to use her superhuman abilities efficiently. She becomes weaker rather than stronger when she gets angry. She still maintains superhuman abilities such as enhanced strength, with her lowest strength being equivalent to that of Peter Parker / Spider-Man. This was done by her Femizon creators as a failsafe to keep her from turning on them.

== Reception ==
Dalton Norman of Screen Rant named Lyra one of the "10 Best Marvel Characters Who Made Their Debut In The Hulk Comics." Lyra received "enough of a positive fan response to earn her a try-out in a brand-new mini-series."

== Literary reception ==
=== Volumes ===
==== All-New Savage She-Hulk (2009) ====
According to Diamond Comic Distributors, All-New Savage She-Hulk #1 was the 102nd best selling comic book in April 2009.

Doug Zawisza of Comic Book Resources asserted, "All-New Savage She-Hulk #1 is rounded out with a seven-page behind the scenes conversation with Fred Van Lente, Jeff Parker, and Paul Tobin, moderated by editor Mark Paniccia. This may not be the most ideal way to try to justify the extra buck this issue runs above many other shelfmates, but it does offer a little more creativity than some randomly fished out reprint would." Joe Garza of SlashFilm included the All-New Savage She-Hulk comic book series in their "15 Best She-Hulk Comics You Need To Read," stating, "The story is also worth reading because it plants the seeds of She-Hulk and Lyra's friendship, which plays out further in She-Hulks: Hunt For The Intelligencia." Bryan Joel of IGN gave All-New Savage She-Hulk #1 a grade of 7 out of 10, writing, "The issue looks just as good as it reads, thanks to the duo of Peter Vale and Robert Atkins. The artists share the pencil duties, but the whole issue maintains a classic, traditional feel throughout, with some impressive figure work on Lyra herself. The artists do a good job matching the feel of Van Lente's script. It's always a gamble devoting an entire miniseries to an essentially unknown, unproven character, and Lyra may need a little tinkering to be a successful lead in the future, but All New Savage She-Hulk demonstrates a lot of potential and succeeds in being a fun old-school romp that is at least better than the last couple years of the title whose name it inherited."

==== Fall of the Hulks: The Savage She-Hulks (2010) ====
According to Diamond Comic Distributors, Fall of the Hulks: The Savage She-Hulks #1 was the 59th best selling comic book in March 2010.

== Other versions ==
=== Fall of the Hulks: Red Hulk ===
An alternate version of Lyra appears in Fall of the Hulks: Red Hulk. She and Intelligencia have taken over the world.

=== Venom ===
An alternate version of Lyra appears in Venom. She is an ally of Red-Shulk and is a member of his task force.

== In other media ==
Lyra / She-Hulk appears as an alternate costume for Jennifer Walters / She-Hulk in Marvel vs. Capcom 3: Fate of Two Worlds and Ultimate Marvel vs. Capcom 3.

== Collected editions ==
Title	Material collected	Published date	ISBN
Savage She-Hulk	All-New Savage She-Hulk #1-4	October 2009	978-0785140788
Fall of the Hulks: The Savage She-Hulks	Fall Of The Hulks: The Savage She-Hulks #1-3 and material from Incredible Hulk #600-605	August 2010	978-0785147961
She-Hulks: Hunt for the Intelligencia	She-Hulks #1-4 and material from She-Hulk Sensational #1	June 2011	978-0785150008

== See also ==
- She-Hulk
- Skaar
- Hiro-Kala
- Scorpion (Carmilla Black)
- Red She-Hulk
