= Rick Jones (character) =

Marvel Comics fictional character

- Rick Jones as depicted in All-New Venom #4 (March 2025). Art by Carlos Gomez

Publication information
- Publisher: Marvel Comics
- First appearance: As Rick Jones: The Incredible Hulk #1 (May 1962); As Bucky: The Avengers #7 (August 1964); As A-Bomb: Hulk (vol. 2) #2 (February 2008); As Whisperer: Avengers Standoff: Assault on Pleasant Hill Alpha #1 (March 2016); As Abomination: The Immortal Hulk #17 (May 2019); As Sleeper Agent: All-New Venom #4 (March 2025); As Captain Spider: All-New Venom #10 (September 2025)
- Created by: Stan Lee (writer); Jack Kirby (artist)

In-story information
- Full name: Richard Milhouse Jones
- Species: Human mutate
- Team affiliations: Avengers; Young Avengers; Champions; Loners
- Supporting character of: Hulk; Captain America; Captain Marvel (Mar-Vell); Rom; Captain Marvel (Genis-Vell)
- Notable aliases: Bucky; Hulk; A-Bomb; Whisperer; Subject B Abomination; Sleeper Agent; Captain Spider
- Abilities: Expertise in acrobatics, unarmed combat, and hacking; Skilled guitarist, harmonica player, and songwriter; Quick learning speed; As A-Bomb: Superhuman strength and durability; Camouflage

Richard Milhouse Jones is a character appearing in American comic books published by Marvel Comics. The character has been depicted as a sidekick and friend to the Hulk, Captain America, Mar-Vell / Captain Marvel, Rom the Space Knight, Genis-Vell / Captain Marvel, and Mary Jane Watson / Venom.

The character has been an active participant in many significant Marvel storylines, including the Kree–Skrull War and the Destiny War. Rick has acquired superpowers on numerous occasions: he was briefly transformed into a version of the Hulk in a 1986 story arc and became A-Bomb, a gamma mutate resembling a blue version of the Abomination, after being experimented on by the Intelligencia in Hulk (vol. 2). Rick later becomes a hacktivist after Doc Green, an alternate persona of Bruce Banner, removes his powers. He has also taken on the mantles of Bucky, Abomination, Sleeper Agent, and Captain Spider.

Rick Jones has been adapted into various media outside comics, primarily in association with the Hulk. Luke Perry voiced Rick in the animated series The Incredible Hulk (1996), which adapted his time as Hulk in the comics. Seth Green voiced Rick as A-Bomb in the animated series Hulk and the Agents of S.M.A.S.H. (2013), where he is depicted as a member of the eponymous team. Green reprised the role in the Ultimate Spider-Man episode "Return to the Spider-Verse" (2016), voicing a version of Rick from the Marvel Noir universe.

== Publication history ==
Rick Jones first appeared in Hulk #1 (May 1962), and was created by Stan Lee and Jack Kirby. His A-Bomb identity first appeared in Hulk (vol. 2) #2 (February 2008), and was created by writer Jeph Loeb and artist Ed McGuinness.

== Fictional character biography ==
Rick Jones was born in Scarsdale, Arizona. He lost his parents at a young age and grew up in an orphanage. Later, he accepted a dare to drive out to a testing ground in New Mexico as the gamma bomb designed by Bruce Banner was being tested. Banner pushed Rick into a protective trench, saving his life, but absorbing the gamma rays that transform Banner into the Hulk. Rick thus became the sole confidant of the Hulk's identity.

=== Early days with the Hulk and the Avengers ===
Rick's guilt over causing the incident (and lack of any other place to go) led him to stay close to Banner and the Hulk. In one story, he even gained mental control over Hulk. Eventually, the dangerous unpredictability of Hulk forced Rick to keep his distance.

Later, Rick formed the Teen Brigade, a loose network of teenagers with ham radios throughout the United States. The first Brigade played a role in the origin of the Avengers when the Norse god Loki tampered with the Brigade's radio transmission. Originally, the Brigade intended to bring the Fantastic Four together to battle the Hulk, but instead brought Iron Man, Ant-Man, Wasp, and Thor together to form the Avengers.

After the Hulk's departure from the team, Rick became an honorary Avenger. He alerted the team to the Hulk's presence when they began searching for him. He became close to the recently revived Captain America although his guilt led him to leave the Avengers and seek out Banner and Hulk on his own.

Captain America rescued Rick from one of Hulk's rampages, and after that Rick became Captain America's sidekick, briefly taking the title and uniform of Bucky Barnes, Captain America's long-dead junior partner. This was on Jones' own insistence, over Captain America's guilty objections, noting that others have also lost partners and that it was time to move on. Rick's brief time as Bucky gave him the training to survive around superheroes.

When Rick believed Hulk to be dead (although Hulk had actually been sent to the future), he revealed the truth of Banner's condition to Glenn Talbot, thus inadvertently making Banner a wanted fugitive by the military.

=== Captain Mar-Vell ===
After being neglected by Captain America, Rick became fed up with the Captain's ego. After talking with Edwin Jarvis, Rick decided to leave the Avengers for good. Rick joined with the Kree Mar-Vell when he finds himself drawn to the mystical Nega-Bands. Donning the Bands, he is immediately linked to Captain Marvel. Once joined, one of the two remains in a protective bubble in the Negative Zone. After either the person not in the Negative Zone strikes the Nega-Bands together or a certain amount of time passes, the two switch places. Rick and Mar-Vell go on various adventures encountering many different heroes, such as the Hulk, Namor, and Captain America.

Rick and Mar-Vell play a critical part in the Kree–Skrull War. Rick is freed from the Negative Zone through a portal in the Fantastic Four headquarters. Mar-Vell is released from the Negative Zone while Rick is still in the regular world without the use of the Nega-Bands. The bond between the two is broken. At the height of the conflict, the Supreme Intelligence briefly unleashes the Destiny Force from within Rick. Rick uses his newfound ability to summon images of various Golden Age heroes. While at full power, Rick single-handedly stops both the Kree and Skrull fleets long enough to put an end to the conflict. Injuries that Rick sustains lead Mar-Vell to willingly bond with Rick to save his life. Shortly after this, the Captain Marvel series was re-launched and it is revealed that Rick could not contain Mar-Vell's energy. He was then bombarded with photonic energy, which saved him and enabled him to contain Mar-Vell safely. A consequence of this was that Mar-Vell gained the ability to absorb energy in addition to the Nega-Band energies to boost his strength and could fly using photonic energy.

Rick and Mar-Vell serve as a duo for several years while Rick pursues his musical career and love life. Eventually, the two are again freed from their bond while aiding the Avengers against the Super-Adaptoid. Rick then parts company with Mar-Vell. Rick begins to spend his time with the Hulk again and briefly forms a new Teen Brigade, after which Rick finds himself again teamed with Mar-Vell, though not merged with him as they deal with Thanos. Sometime after, Mar-Vell dies from cancer that he developed after the villain Nitro exposed him to nerve gas.

=== Venturing with Rom ===
After Mar-Vell's death, Rick began to team with the Hulk again. Guilt over causing Banner to be hit with the gamma rays made Rick decide to expose himself to gamma rays in an attempt to become another Hulk-like being that could stop the Hulk. However this plan backfired and Rick was dying of gamma poisoning until Banner cured him. However, this too led to the consequence of Rick developing a form of blood cancer.

Rick was going to undergo a massive blood transfusion to treat this ailment when the hospital was attacked by monsters created by the Dire Wraiths. Rick was saved by the Spaceknight Rom and began to team with Rom despite the fact that Rick was slowly dying. Following the defeat of the Wraiths, Rom banished them to Limbo and then bade farewell to Rick and Earth. Shortly after Rom left, Rick met the alien Beyonder during the "Secret Wars II" storyline where Beyonder cured his cancer.

=== Reunion with the Hulk ===
Shortly after the encounter with the Beyonder, Rick once again teamed with the Hulk. This time, the Hulk had been split into two beings, Banner and Hulk, but the experiment was a failure and both were dying. Thunderbolt Ross tried to stop the process of remerging the two, and Rick intervened only to be dumped into the chemical nutrient bath that was fusing Banner and the Hulk again, transforming into a Hulk-like creature.

With the Vision's help, Banner and the Hulk are reunited, but, both are weak and still dying. As a result of a nutrient bath developed by Doc Samson, Banner/Hulk is reverted from Green Hulk into the Grey Hulk. During this time, Rick as Hulk battled the Grey Hulk, Zzzax, the Hulkbusters, and the Outcasts. The Grey Hulk is manipulated by Samuel Sterns, along with Banner, into siphoning the radiation from Rick into Sterns. Sterns is then turned back into the Leader and Rick is cured of his Hulk transformations.

Rick stays with Banner, the Grey Hulk, Betty Ross, and Clay Quartermain for several months as they travel the country looking for a government supply of gamma bombs. The group splits after the Hulk's apparent death at the Leader's hands. Rick's psionic potential is later released by Moondragon against Atlantean invaders.

Rick authors the book "Sidekick", an autobiography of his time with super-heroes. While on a book tour, he meets Marlo Chandler without realizing that she had only recently broken up with the Hulk (then acting as a thug in Las Vegas under the alias Mr. Fixit). Rick is kidnapped by a Skrull vessel and the Hulk aids in Rick's rescue. This starts another period with Rick and the Hulk, this time with Marlo and Betty.

=== Encounters with death ===
Rick came in touch with death in several ways during this time with the Hulk. First, Rick dies at the hands of Thanos, along with half of the universe, when Thanos uses the Infinity Gauntlet to impress Death. Rick and the others are brought back in ensuing events.

Rick assisted the Hulk many times during his tenure with the Pantheon. During this time, he guns down an insane killer, but is still wracked with remorse. Over time he bonds with Wolfsbane of X-Factor, who also killed another insane murderer during the same debacle; he even ends up inviting her to his wedding.

Another major encounter with death occurs when Jackie Shorr (who is revealed to be a demented serial killer) comes into his life and claims to be his mother. This claim has not been proven, but she insists that those she killed and left mummified in her basement were substitutes for Rick, and that he is her real son. Shorr is discovered to be insane, but not until after she kills Marlo by stabbing her with a kitchen knife. A horrified Rick refuses Reed Richards's offer to carry out a DNA test, saying that he does not want to know, especially if she is truly his mother.

Rick attempts to bring Marlo back using a resurrection device known as the "deus ex machina" that the Leader developed, but the Hulk, believing that the Leader's efforts are part of a larger villainous plan, destroys the equipment partway through the process. Marlo is left in a catatonic state. Rick's care eventually helps Marlo return to full health despite the intervention of many other well-meaning friends and family, including Marlo's brothers and Captain America.

Shortly after Marlo is revived, the two become engaged and quickly marry. Neither of them realizes, however, that a portion of Death remains in Marlo. This piece of Death attracted many strange visitors to the wedding, including Mephisto and Death herself.

The married couple soon finds success in a popular talk show, Keeping Up with the Joneses, but it is cut short when Rick is crippled by a Banner-less Hulk, who made a deal to work for Apocalypse and become his Horseman "War" if he removed the shrapnel from the Hulk's brain. The injury confines Rick to a wheelchair and the debilitation strains his relationship with Marlo. The strain increases following Betty Ross' death, with the couple splitting shortly thereafter.

Rick joins Banner again after he returns to Earth and merges with the separated Hulk. His health problems force him to be brought by the Avengers to the now-captive Supreme Intelligence for aid, which marks the beginning of the Destiny War, as Kang the Conqueror's rejection of his apparent destiny to become Immortus results in Rick's access to the Destiny Force being used to draw in a team of seven Avengers from different points in time to act as his protectors. Over the course of these events, Rick's injury is healed when he channels the Destiny Force into himself, and after the battle with the Time Keepers, he is joined with Genis-Vell (the new Captain Marvel and son of Mar-Vell), due to a temporal paradox involving the future Genis-Vell linking with Rick to save his life.

=== Captain Marvel (Genis-Vell) ===
Rick's bond with Genis works in about the same way as his bond with Mar-Vell. The biggest difference is that the two switch in and out of the Microverse rather than the Negative Zone. Genis-Vell's unique birth and accelerated aging makes him the opposite of Rick: full of power but without experience. They compensate for each other's weaknesses with Rick taking on the role of mentor. He helps Genis learn to control his cosmic awareness and accept his role as a superhero. As Rick's confidence grows, he also attempts to rekindle his romance with Marlo.

It was not until this point that Marlo's connection with Death is finally revealed. Thanos aids in separating the two, but Rick is prematurely aged and loses an arm in the process. He is later yanked back in time to the Destiny War, where he aids his younger self in the conflict leading to his bond with Genis.

Marlo tries to aid the elderly Rick the way he had helped her when she was catatonic. Rick's pride, however, just causes more problems. The Supreme Intelligence attempts and fails to restore Rick to his normal condition, but he is spontaneously restored to his normal age and health shortly thereafter. Rick believes this was divine aid, while Genis believes it was a delayed reaction to the Supreme Intelligence's procedure.

For a while, Rick and Genis are yanked back and forth through time. Rick encounters two older versions of himself: one an aging collector surviving under the rule of the Maestro; the other a super-villain named Thanatos. The super-villain Rick was in the process of creating the "ultimate Rick Jones". He is stopped by the elder Rick's ability to wield Thor's hammer Mjolnir, Rick having been judged worthy for things the present Rick had yet to do and things that Thanatos would never achieve.

Rick and Marlo again split when Marlo becomes romantically involved with Moondragon. Shortly after, Genis goes insane when his cosmic awareness reaches its peak. Rick's attempts to continue as Genis' guide are fairly unsuccessful. Genis becomes a callous, homicidal maniac believing himself a god. Rick's friend even destroys the universe just to rebuild it with Rick and Genis as sole survivors.

In the rebuilt reality, Genis again loses his mind. Rick develops an ability to mentally attack Genis through their psychic bond, although the pain is reciprocal. For a time, Genis uses this same link to control Rick. He goes as far as 'convincing' Rick to kill himself on a whim. Genis brings Rick right back to life just as easily.

In part due to Rick's influence, Genis' madness calms to a point where he maintains a degree of sanity, albeit with some unpredictability. He creates a recording studio for Rick that allows for fame and fortune at the sake of Internet-based sales of a song written for Marlo. The same song also acts as a catalyst for the two to reunite, with Marlo ending her relationship with Moondragon.

At the end of the series, it is revealed that Rick has a "comic awareness" that the Captain Marvel comic series is ending. He pushes for several loose ends to be resolved: Rick and Genis are separated again and Rick is reunited with Marlo.

=== Runaways ===
Rick was revealed to be the mysterious benefactor of Excelsior. The group is composed of former teenage superheroes dedicated to reforming other super-powered kids from following down the same path. Their first targets are the Runaways patrolling Los Angeles in the wake of the supervillain power vacuum since the defeat of the Runaways' evil parents, the Pride, who once controlled the city. Rick tells Excelsior that he wanted the Runaways back in foster care because he did not want them to go through the same experiences he went through.

Rick serves as one of the pallbearers at the memorial service for Captain America following his death during the "Fallen Son: The Death of Captain America" storyline.

=== World War Hulk ===
Rick re-connects with the Hulk during the World War Hulk mini-series. He seeks out the Hulk and attempts to talk him down, telling his friend that, while he recognized that the Illuminati had been out of line in their decision to exile him to Sakaar and their apparent involvement with the deaths of thousands of innocent people on that planet, including the Hulk's wife Caiera, his quest for vengeance was not him, using Hulk's willingness to protect innocent people caught in the fight between him and a Zom-possessed Doctor Strange as proof that the Hulk was still a hero rather than a man blindly seeking vengeance. After the Hulk's climactic battle with the Sentry resulted in him reverting to Bruce Banner, Miek stabs Rick to provoke Banner into turning back into the Hulk. Rick is seen being loaded into an ambulance.

=== Becoming A-Bomb ===
Rick Jones as A-Bomb, from Hulk (vol. 2) #2 (April 2008). Art by Ed McGuinness.

In the aftermath of World War Hulk, the Intelligencia use Abomination's DNA to transform Rick Jones into a Hulk-like creature called A-Bomb. He initially possesses a low level of intelligence similar to the Hulk, but later gains the ability to retain his human consciousness. In Hulk (vol. 3), Rick loses his powers after being given a cure by Doc Green, a new personality of Bruce Banner who believes gamma-powered superhumans to be a threat to humanity.

=== Working as Whisperer ===
As a side effect of losing his Hulk abilities, Rick briefly gains the ability to learn any task at lightning speed. During the "Avengers: Standoff!" storyline, he uses this ability to become a hacktivist known as the Whisperer and secretly aids the new Captain America. Rick uncovers a plot by Maria Hill called Project Kobik, which uses shattered Cosmic Cube remains to create a new cube. Phil Coulson's group learns about Pleasant Hill and Rick's involvement. Deathlok, Daisy Johnson, and Jemma Simmons investigate Rick's house and discovered a hidden escape route. They follow Rick through the Morlock tunnels and apprehend him. During an interrogation at the S.H.I.E.L.D. Battlecarrier, the New Avengers arrive to retrieve Rick from S.H.I.E.L.D. The Pentagon retaliates by unleashing the American Kaiju on the New Avengers. In the aftermath, Steve Rogers offers Rick the chance to join S.H.I.E.L.D. as part of his reparations for his hacktivism.

In the Secret Empire storyline (2017), Rick entrusts Rayshaun Lucas with data to prove the innocence of Captain America, who the Red Skull brainwashed into becoming a member of Hydra. Captain America later executes Rick by firing squad.

=== Immortal Hulk ===
In The Immortal Hulk (2019), Charlene McGowan and several other scientists retrieve Rick's corpse and revive him as an Abomination-like creature called Subject B. Rick is later cut in half by McGowan and his remains fuse with the gamma mutate Del Frye. Shaman determines that the two cannot be separated, but Absorbing Man does so using the Cathexis Ray, a weapon that drains gamma energy.

=== All-New Venom ===
In All-New Venom (2025), Rick becomes the host of the Sleeper symbiote and assumes the alias of Sleeper Agent. Later in the series, he bonds with the Toxin symbiote to save it from death.

== Powers and abilities ==
Rick Jones is an athletic man who previously had no powers. He received special training in combat and gymnastics by Captain America, making him a highly skilled martial artist. Rick is also a self-taught folk/rock 'n' roll singer, guitarist, and harmonica player.

One time, Rick wielded the Destiny Force: a powerful ability utilized during the Kree–Skrull War storyline. Focusing this power allowed him to perform amazing feats, such as summoning various members of the Avengers from past, present and future. However, the Destiny Force's effects are generally random unless another controlling influence such as Libra is assisting him.

Rick's latent psionic potential had been once unleashed by the Supreme Intelligence, but he is unable to utilize it at will. He could shift dimensional positions with Mar-Vell, and later Genis-Vell for a time.

As A-Bomb, Rick Jones possesses abilities similar to the Abomination, including superhuman strength and durability. Due to being spliced with cuttlefish and chameleon DNA, he possesses the additional ability to become invisible via camouflage. After losing his powers to Doc Green, Rick temporarily gains the ability to learn information rapidly, making him an expert hacker.

As Subject B, Rick possesses superhuman strength, enhanced durability, regeneration, and the ability to generate acid.

== Reception ==
=== Accolades ===
- In 2015, Entertainment Weekly ranked Rick Jones 18th in their "Let's rank every Avenger ever" list.
- Various websites, including Comic Book Resources, Collider, and Newsarama, have assessed Rick Jones as among the strongest sidekicks in comics.

== Other versions ==
=== Marvel 2099 ===
Thanatos, an alternate universe version of Rick Jones, appears in Spider-Man 2099, although his identity is not revealed until a later appearance in Captain Marvel.

=== The Incredible Hulk: Future Imperfect ===
An alternate universe version of Rick Jones from Earth-9200 appears in The Incredible Hulk: Future Imperfect. This version is a member of a resistance against the Maestro.

=== The Last Avengers Story ===
An alternate universe version of Rick Jones from Earth-9511 appears in The Last Avengers Story.

=== Ultimate Marvel ===
An alternate universe version of Rick Jones from Earth-1610 appears in the Ultimate Marvel imprint. This version is a superhero who was given powers by the Watchers and is also known as Nova and Captain Marvel.

== In other media ==
=== Television ===
Rick Jones as depicted in The Incredible Hulk (1996)

- Rick Jones appears in The Marvel Super Heroes, voiced by Paul Soles.
- Rick Jones appears in The Incredible Hulk (1982), voiced by Michael Horton.
- Rick Jones appears in the Fantastic Four episode "Nightmare in Green", voiced by Benny Grant.
- Rick Jones appears in The Incredible Hulk (1996), voiced by Luke Perry.
- Rick Jones appears in the Iron Man: Armored Adventures episode "Uncontrollable", voiced by Andrew Francis.
- Rick Jones / A-Bomb appears in Hulk and the Agents of S.M.A.S.H., voiced by Seth Green. This version is a founding member of the eponymous team who was mutated by exposure to gamma radiation and possesses the additional ability to transform into a spherical wrecking ball-like form.
  - Additionally, a possible future version of Rick appears in the episode "Enter, the Maestro", also voiced by Seth Green.
- Rick Jones / A-Bomb makes a non-speaking cameo appearance in the Ultimate Spider-Man episode "Contest of Champions".
  - Additionally, a Marvel Noir-inspired alternate universe version of Rick who is a member of Joe Fixit's gang appears in the episode "Return to the Spider-Verse", voiced by Seth Green.

=== Film ===
- Rick Jones was originally intended to appear in Hulk (2003), but was replaced by Harper (portrayed by Kevin Rankin), Bruce Banner's colleague.
- Rick Jones was originally planned to appear in The Incredible Hulk (2008), but was written out by Edward Norton.

=== Video games ===
- Rick Jones appears in The Incredible Hulk film tie-in game, voiced by Jon Curry.
- Rick Jones / A-Bomb appears as an NPC in Marvel: Ultimate Alliance 2, voiced by Fred Tatasciore.
- Rick Jones / A-Bomb appears as a playable DLC character in Lego Marvel Super Heroes, voiced by Will Friedle and Steve Blum respectively.
- Rick Jones / A-Bomb appears as a playable character in Marvel Avengers Alliance.
- Rick Jones / A-Bomb appears as a playable character in Lego Marvel's Avengers, voiced by Robbie Daymond.
- Rick Jones / A-Bomb appears as a playable character in Lego Marvel Super Heroes 2.
