= Mongu (comics) =

Mongu is a fictional character appearing in American comic books published by Marvel Comics. The character first appeared in The Incredible Hulk #4 (November 1962).

== Fictional character biography ==
Boris Monguski was a Soviet agent who wore an exoskeleton called Mongu, and was defeated by the Hulk.
