= Scorpion (Carmilla Black) =

Fictional comic book villain

- Cover of Amazing Fantasy vol. 2 #7. Art by James Jean

Publication information
- Publisher: Marvel Comics
- First appearance: Amazing Fantasy (vol. 2) #7 (June 2005)
- Created by: Fred Van Lente; Leonard Kirk

In-story information
- Alter ego: Carmilla Black (born Thasanee Rappaccini)
- Species: Human mutate
- Team affiliations: S.H.I.E.L.D.; Hydra
- Abilities: Trained martial artist; Immunity to poisons; Left arm delivers "sting" ranging from causing mild discomfort to killing with a touch; Semi-organic tail

Scorpion (Carmilla Black, born Thasanee Rappaccini) is a fictional character appearing in American comic books published by Marvel Comics. She first appears in Amazing Fantasy (vol. 2) #7 and was created by Fred Van Lente and Leonard Kirk.

== Publication history ==
The Scorpion was originally intended to be the daughter of the Silver Samurai and Viper, thus explaining Carmilla's hair color.

The name Rappaccini is an allusion to "Rappaccini's Daughter", an 1844 short story by Nathaniel Hawthorne. The title character of the story is a beautiful young woman whose breath and touch have been rendered poisonous by the experiments of her father.

== Fictional character biography ==
After the murder of her adoptive parents, Carmilla discovers that her biological mother, Monica Rappaccini, is Scientist Supreme of the worldwide terrorist network A.I.M. (Advanced Idea Mechanics). Carmilla tries to find her real mother under the auspices of S.H.I.E.L.D., who attempt to use her to infiltrate A.I.M. She appears in The Incredible Hulk #87, a one-shot story that takes place immediately after "House of M". Hulk writer Peter David suggested that Bruce Banner may be Carmilla's biological father.

=== Captain Universe ===
Carmilla and her S.H.I.E.L.D. handler, agent Derek Khanata, are sent to New York under orders to track down and capture the Uni-Power before it can fall into the hands of A.I.M. Watching over the spot where a Captain Universe–empowered Daredevil battled four A.I.M. commandos, Scorpion and Khanata wait to see if A.I.M. finds anything. A group of children interrupt the A.I.M. Agents' work and are nearly killed until X-23 steps in. The A.I.M. commandos who battled Daredevil before attack X-23 when she becomes Captain Universe. Scorpion enters the fray, helping X-23/Captain Universe defeat the Commandos. Soon afterwards, X-23 begins to search for a hidden base. Scorpion joins her to capture Captain Universe and get the information on it from A.I.M. However, X-23 convinces Scorpion to let Captain Universe go. X-23 takes Captain Universe to a safe hiding place while Scorpion brings an A.I.M. scientist back to S.H.I.E.L.D. for interrogation.

=== Civil War/The Initiative ===
Carmilla is among the 142 registered superheroes who appear on the cover of Avengers: The Initiative #1.

In Spider-Man Family #3 (set before Civil War: Choosing Sides #1), she appears in a short story again written by Fred Van Lente and drawn by Leonard Kirk. Here, she infiltrates the unregistered superhero underground for S.H.I.E.L.D. and is sent on missions to establish a presence as a superhero. When Mac Gargan, the then-current Venom and former Scorpion, learns about Carmilla, he challenges her to a fight, since he is negotiating for a film based on his life and does not want her diluting his trademark. Carmilla defeats Gargan by absorbing some of his webbing, creating a "neo-symbiote" which disintegrates after she has defeated him.

=== World War Hulk ===
Carmilla is seen trying to aid S.H.I.E.L.D. upon the Hulk's return. She fills his body with a S.H.I.E.L.D.-devised poison concoction specially designed to kill him, but it only creates boils on his skin, which heal after several minutes. Amadeus Cho reveals to her that Bruce Banner (the Hulk's alter ego) and Monica Rappaccini had an affair while in college, potentially making Banner her biological father. Carmilla attacks a S.H.I.E.L.D. truck transporting Banner to an underground prison, only to discover that he is a decoy.

=== Dark Reign ===
It is revealed that Carmilla is now Hardball's lover and is the co-leader of a Hydra training facility in Madripoor. Carmilla and Hardball confront the Shadow Initiative, along with an army of Hydra agents, shortly after learning they were searching for Hardball. It is later revealed that Carmilla was working undercover for an unknown source, implied to be Nick Fury. She convinces Hardball to turn himself in and secretly steals his S.P.I.N. Tech dart.

=== The Gauntlet and Grim Hunt ===
Carmilla appears in a new costume during The Gauntlet and Grim Hunt storyline. She reveals that after quitting S.H.I.E.L.D., she began taking independent contracts. She is hired by Kraven the Hunter's family to steal Mac Gargan's original costume from the Hood, who is planning to give it to any low-level crook that impresses him. Scorpion stings Spider-Man and he temporarily loses his powers. She then proceeds to fight the Hood and his allies and is quickly overwhelmed. However, Spider-Man regains his powers and saves her. Carmilla delivers the suit to Sasha Kravinoff and Ana Kravinoff.

== Powers and abilities ==
Scorpion was genetically designed by her "mother" as part of a group of similar children called the Wakers to be immune against environmental toxins. Her unique body chemistry makes her immune to most types of poisons, gases, radiation, and diseases and enables her to release filtered toxins at will. She also gained nearly indestructible mind-controlled gauntlets packed full of S.H.I.E.L.D. technology and a body suit that manages to stop most, if not all, weapons and has other built-in gadgets.

Since Madripoor, she has added a tail (similar to that of Mac Gargan, the original Scorpion) to her costume with a stinger that injects S.P.I.N. tech nanites after ingesting the contents of the dart that she stole from Hardball. The effects only last half an hour. Since she has said that the source of the nanites is her own body, it is hinted that, unlike the original Scorpion, her tail may be semi-organic (Gargan's is mechanical).

== Other versions ==
An alternate universe version of Scorpion appears in House of M. This version is an agent of A.I.M. who was raised by Monica Rappaccini and goes by her birth name of Thasanee Rappaccini.

== In other media ==
- A character loosely based on Scorpion named Carmilla Rappaccini appears in M.O.D.O.K., voiced by Zara Mizrahi. This version is a pre-teen goth who is the result of Monica inseminating herself with a male clone of herself named Manica, though Carmilla takes no interest in her mother's work.
- Carmilla Black appears in Your Friendly Neighborhood Spider-Man, voiced by Anairis Quiñones. This version is the second-in-command of the Scorpions gang.

== Collected editions ==
Title	Material collected	Published date	ISBN
Scorpion: Poison Tomorrow	Amazing Fantasy (vol. 2) #7–12	November 2005	978-0785117124
