= Hulkbusters =

Fictional comic book organizations

Publication information
- Publisher: Marvel Comics

In-story information
- Member(s): Craig Saunders Jr. Carolyn Parmenter; Samuel LaRoquette; Armand Martel; Hideko Takata

Hulkbusters is the name of three organizations appearing in American comic books published by Marvel Comics. All three groups exist within Marvel's shared universe known as the Marvel Universe and are so-named for their attempts to battle the Hulk.

== Publication history ==
Bruce Banner's incarnation of the Hulkbusters first appeared in The Incredible Hulk #317 (March 1986) and were created by John Byrne.

== Fictional history ==
=== The U.S. military's Hulkbusters ===
The original group called the Hulkbusters was a task force consisting of personnel from both the U.S. Army and Air Force, created to capture or destroy the Hulk. The operation is headquartered in New Mexico and headed by Thunderbolt Ross, John Ryker, and Major Glenn Talbot. After he learns to retain his intelligence and personality as the Hulk, Bruce Banner is pardoned and the Hulkbusters disband.

=== Bruce Banner's Hulkbusters ===
After the Hulk reverts to his bestial personality, he is captured by Doc Samson. Samson persuades the government to rebuild and finance Gamma Base. There, Samson manages to separate Bruce Banner and the Hulk, although the Hulk manages to escape. Banner leads a new iteration of the Hulkbusters in tracking down the Hulk.

Members of this group of Hulkbusters included:

- Craig Saunders Jr. – Demolition expert (later known as Redeemer)
- Carolyn Parmenter – Marine scientist
- Samuel LaRoquette – Explorer (later known as Rock)
- Armand Martel – Xenobiologist
- Hideko Takata – Geophysics professor

Saunders and LaRoquette later became Rock and Redeemer after much of Bruce Banner's Hulkbuster team were killed. Rock had an external hide made of deadly minerals which can be used to impale and grow in size. Redeemer uses an exoskeletal suit with weapons like repulsor blasters, and rocket fuel. The Leader later recruits the two into "New Freehold" along with the Riot Squad.

=== S.H.I.E.L.D.'s Hulkbusters ===
Hulk's exile from Earth by the Illuminati during the events of "Planet Hulk" leads to his enemies causing chaos unopposed. As a result, S.H.I.E.L.D. forms a team called the Hulkbusters to capture the villains and implant them with nanotechnology to nullify their powers. The team was led by Clay Quartermain and members included Agent Cheesecake, Agent Crimson, and She-Hulk.

== Other versions ==
An alternate universe iteration of the Hulkbusters from Earth-1610 appears in the Ultimate Marvel universe. This version of the group works under Nick Fury and S.H.I.E.L.D.

== In other media ==
=== Television ===
- The original Hulkbusters appear in The Incredible Hulk (1996). This version is led by Thunderbolt Ross and Gabriel Jones.
- The original Hulkbusters appear in The Avengers: Earth's Mightiest Heroes.
- S.H.I.E.L.D.'s Hulkbusters appear in the Ultimate Spider-Man episode "The Incredible Spider-Hulk". This version is led by Phil Coulson.
- The original Hulkbusters appear in Hulk and the Agents of S.M.A.S.H.. These versions are a countermeasure for the Agents of S.M.A.S.H.
- The Hulkbusters appear in Avengers Assemble.

=== Video games ===
- The Hulkbusters appear in Hulk (2003). These versions are military units controlled by John Ryker.
- The Hulkbusters appear in The Incredible Hulk: Ultimate Destruction. These versions are soldiers who mentally control mechanical armor of varying sizes and capabilities.
- Armored Hulkbusters appear in The Incredible Hulk (2008), with two voiced by S. Scott Bullock and Chris Edgerly. These suits are identified as StarkTech models.

=== Novels ===
Craig Saunders Jr. and Samuel LaRoquette appear in the novelization of the 2008 film The Incredible Hulk. These versions are members of a military strike team sent to capture the Hulk and also appear unnamed in the film.
