= World War Hulks =

Comic book storyline

- Cover of the 1st issue (art by John Romita Jr.)
- Publisher: Marvel Comics
- Publication date: April – August 2010
- Genre: Superhero; Crossover
Title(s)
Hulk vol. 2 #22–24
Incredible Hulk #609–611
World War Hulks #1
World War Hulks: Hulked-Out Heroes #1–2
World War Hulks: Spider-Man vs. Thor #1–2
World War Hulks: Captain America Vs. Wolverine #1–2
- Main character(s): Hulk; Skaar; Warbound; Intelligencia; Doc Samson; Illuminati; Avengers; Red Hulk; Red She-Hulk

Creative team
- Writer(s): Greg Pak, Jeph Loeb
- Hulk: World War Hulks: ISBN 0-7851-4266-5

"World War Hulks" is a comic book crossover storyline published by Marvel Comics that ran in 2010 following the "Fall of the Hulks" storyline.

The plot builds on the depowering of Bruce Banner by Red Hulk during the "Dark Reign" storyline and the betrayal of Doc Samson who joined with the Intelligencia to bring about the "Fall of the Hulks" to create an army of Hulks to take over the world. "World War Hulks" also shows the origins of Red Hulk (Thunderbolt Ross) and Red She-Hulk (Betty Ross).

"World War Hulks" is the continuation of an arc that began with the Planet Hulk storyline in 2006–07, that continued into World War Hulk (the Marvel event of 2007), through the short lived Skaar: Son of Hulk and into the last two years of both Hulk titles, which have largely focused on the identity of Red Hulk, the depowering of Bruce Banner, and the arrival of Skaar on Earth. "Incredible Hulks: Dark Son", which brings Skaar's brother Hiro-Kala to Earth, is the end of the arc.

== Publication history ==
The series started with a one-shot called World War Hulks, and ran through the series Hulk and Incredible Hulk; it also included some "Fall of the Hulks" titles, two issues of Hulked-Out Heroes and two special World War Hulks, Captain America Vs. Wolverine, and Spider-Man vs Thor. Also, Hulked Out Heroes revealed the names of the Hulkified versions of those that were turned into Hulks.

The series revealed the identities and origins of both Red Hulk and Red She-Hulk. Additionally, the series brought back Bruce Banner as the Hulk and set up the fight with his father that Skaar has been longing for.

== Plot summary ==
Ulik resurfaces and is shown to have gone on a multi-state drinking binge. He ends up destroying a train bridge with the disaster being averted by A-Bomb and Marlo Chandler. When Ulik starts choking Marlo, he is defeated by A-Bomb.

While in a fantasy world where Bruce Banner killed the Hulk and the smart heroes joined the smart villains in a machine to help the world and where General Thunderbolt Ross is still alive, Banner is visited by Doctor Doom who gives him a robot arm. Back at his home (with his imaginary family which consists of Betty Ross, a son, and a daughter), he activates it and wakes up for a moment. He is quickly interrupted by his fantasy son. While playing with his fantasy family, Doctor Doom arrives. Doctor Doom harms his son that then transforms into Skaar, forcing Banner to activate the arm and get himself and Doctor Doom back to reality. Meanwhile, Glenn Talbot sends the army to fight the marines that were taking Washington. They receive back up from Skaar, Korg, and A-Bomb. The fight continues until the Hulked-Out Heroes arrive and attack them. Rick says they must find Banner so Skaar launches them to the Hellicarrier where Banner is captive while staying behind to fight Hulked-Out-Heroes consisting of Hulkified versions of Captain America, Thor, Ms. Marvel, Cyclops, Iceman, Storm, Human Torch, Invisible Woman, and Thing. Now awake, Banner sees Doctor Doom trying to steal the brains of the smart heroes, since he and the others, including Banner, were still connected to the machine. However, Doom accidentally blows his own brain before being launched off the Intelligencia Helicarrier by Red She-Hulk. Rick and Skaar then arrive and Skaar stabs Red-She-Hulk with his sword forcing her to revert to her human form revealing her true identity as Betty Ross.

Meanwhile, Red Hulk fights the Hulked-Out-Heroes constantly using their powers against themselves until using Hulklops' power to damage the Helicarrier and then escaping briefly seeing a still trapped Banner until being attacked by the Hulkfied versions of Spider-Man and Wolverine, but beats them with a fastball special. Red-She-Hulk arrives and drains the energy from Red Hulk's body, reverting him to his human form of Thunderbolt Ross. Meanwhile, Doc Samson tells MODOK and the Leader that transforming the heroes into Hulks was not a good idea. He then deduces Leader has feelings for Red She-Hulk. Samson then attacks Leader, but is beaten by MODOK.

With Red She-Hulk's identity exposed, Betty begs for Banner to kill her, explaining that she was resurrected by the Intelligencia into an uncontrollable mutation. Although she is willing to die, the appearance of Samson (who was involved in her mutation) inspires enough rage in her that she transforms once again, engaging Samson while Banner and Skaar are contacted by Amadeus Cho, who like the Leader has acquired a mutated mind rather than a mutated body. Using Cho's gamma-enhanced intellect, Banner realises that the Hulked-Out Heroes joined by a Hulkified version of Namor will 'burn out' within twenty-four hours unless the radiation is removed from them. While Cho keeps the Intelligencia occupied, Banner releases Beast, Mister Fantastic, Black Panther and Hank Pym to help him re-tool the Cathexis Ray Generator so that he can draw the gamma energy out of the heroes. Unfortunately, it is only after he has activated the machine that Banner reveals that he is transferring the gamma energy into himself as he is the only person capable of handling that much power. However, the machinery begins to break down from the feedback. Samson steps in and absorbs the additional excess energy, but for unknown reasons his body is unable to absorb the energy as readily as Banner and he is killed by the overload. As his body finishes absorbing the excess radiation, Banner transforms back into the Hulk as the Intelligencia's base is destroyed, Skaar being clearly satisfied at this new chance to kill his father.

General Ross then reviews all of his life and then proceeds to absorb energy from the Cosmic Hulk (who had arrived to attack him) and angrily splits him in two. As Red Hulk, Ross attacks the Leader, who had just escaped from Banner, and takes the gamma energy out of him. Red Hulk then goes to the White House, kills the Glenn Talbot Life Model Decoy, and declares he is in charge.

Banner leaves a video for the heroes telling them how he planned all of these and to allow Skaar to kill him besides saving the civilians. Skaar absorbs energy from the planet (even through the heroes try to stop it) and uses it to attack the Hulk. However, the Hulk decides not to fight him claiming he is not here to fight him, but Skaar then says how Caiera was alive on Sakaar until he allowed Galactus to consume the planet. This ended up angering the Hulk prompting him to continue the fight. During the fight, Red She-Hulk attacks Skaar and tells Hulk to run but he does not. Skaar defeats Red She-Hulk knocking her into a building which is about to collapse on Red She-Hulk's impact. Hulk then saves the civilians in the building with a thunder clap kicking up sand to stop the building from collapsing. Hulk and Skaar then continue their fight where Hulk beats Skaar into submission. Skaar realizes that Hulk is not a monster (something Banner was training him to kill) after saving the people in the building and tells him they will work it out. Realising that continuing their struggle to kill the perceived 'monster' that is his son would accomplish nothing except turning him into his father, Banner returns to human form, and he and Skaar hug.

Banner then transforms into Hulk, fully controlling himself, and goes back to Washington to battle Red Hulk. Red She-Hulk tries to stop it, but is defeated by She-Hulk. Banner's battle with Red Hulk gets them to the Intelligencia, who manage to escape as their battle continues. Their battle eventually ends with Hulk defeating Red Hulk at the Lincoln Memorial, Hulk refusing to kill Red Hulk because of his relationship to Betty even as he informs his adversary that Ross's faked death means that he can never return to his human life now. Later, Banner and Steve Rogers lock Red Hulk up and makes it clear that they have plans for him.

== Titles involved ==
- Hulk (vol. 2) #22–24
- Incredible Hulk #609–611
- World War Hulks #1
- World War Hulks Hulked-Out Heroes #1–2
- World War Hulks Spider-Man vs. Thor #1–2
- World War Hulks Captain America Vs. Wolverine #1–2

== Collected editions ==
Title	Material collected	Published date	ISBN
Hulk Vol. 6: World War Hulks	Hulk (vol. 2) #22-24	November 2010	978-0785142669
Incredible Hulk Vol. 3: World War Hulks	Incredible Hulk #609-611 and Incredible Hulk #312	November 2010	978-0785145479
Hulk: World War Hulks - Hulked-Out Heroes	World War Hulks #1, Hulked-Out Heroes #1-2, World War Hulks: Spider-Man & Thor #1-2, World War Hulks: Wolverine & Captain America #1-2	November 2010	978-0785143710
