= Ravage (Marvel Comics) =

Fictional character in comic books by Marvel Comics

Ravage is the name of two characters appearing in American comic books published by Marvel Comics. The first Ravage is Geoffrey Crawford, an enemy of the Hulk. The second is Cormac Crane, the long-lost son of Spider-Man's Uncle Ben and Aunt May and the long-lost cousin of Spider-Man.

== Publication history ==
The Geoffey Crawford incarnation of Ravage first appeared in Rampaging Hulk (vol. 2) #2 and was created by Glenn Greenberg and Rick Leonardi.

The Cormac Crane incarnation of Ravage first appeared in The Amazing Spider-Man (vol. 7) #26 and was created by Joe Kelly, Francesco Manna, and Ed McGuinness.

== Fictional character biography ==
=== Geoffrey Crawford ===
Ravage
- Ravage (Dr. Geoffrey Crawford) as he appears in Rampaging Hulk Vol. 2 #2 Art by Rick Leonardi.

Publication information
- Publisher: Marvel Comics
- First appearance: Rampaging Hulk vol. 2 #2 (September, 1998)
- Created by: Glenn Greenberg; Rick Leonardi

In-story information
- Alter ego: Geoffrey Crawford
- Species: Human mutate
- Abilities: Expert physicist; Superhuman strength, durability, and leaping; Healing factor

Dr. Geoffrey Crawford is a professor at Desert State University who took undergraduate Bruce Banner under his wing to mentor him. Years later, Banner seeks out Crawford in finding a cure to rid him of the Hulk. At this time, Crawford has been rendered paraplegic by a neuromuscular disease, but nevertheless able to create a machine to filter the gamma radiation from Banner's body. Seeking to cure himself, Crawford uses his machine to rewrite his DNA, transforming him into a creature similar to the Hulk.

As Ravage, Crawford is more powerful than the Hulk and retains his human mind. Just after his first transformation, Ravage attacks the Hulk, but he soon reverts to Crawford at sunrise, much like Banner initially transformed into the Hulk during nightfall and reverted to Banner at sunrise. Crawford turns Banner over to Thunderbolt Ross for fear of being stopped from becoming Ravage again.

Crawford adjusts his machine so that it will change him into Ravage permanently. He then attacks the university as Ravage and terrorizes those who had pitied him as Crawford. Ravage is only stopped when the Hulk forms an unlikely alliance with Ross, who traps Ravage in suspended animation.

=== Cormac Crane ===
Ravage

Publication information
- Publisher: Marvel Comics
- First appearance: The Amazing Spider-Man (vol. 7) #26 (June 2026)
- Created by: Joe Kelly; Francesco Manna; Ed McGuinness

In-story information
- Alter ego: Cormac Crane
- Abilities: Memory manipulation; Superhuman strength; Melee combatant

Cormac Crane, born Richard Benjamin Parker, is the son of Ben Parker and May Parker, making him the cousin of Peter Parker. He was believed to have been stillborn and subsequently adopted by Liam Crane and Beatrix Thyssen.

Crane is initially unaware of his relation to Peter, only learning after Peter's family is targeted by the serial killer Torment. Some time later, May loses all memory of Peter, which is believed to have been caused by a stroke. However, Peter soon learns that Crane erased May's memories, jealous of Peter's bond with her and wanting to make up for lost time.

== Powers and abilities ==
The Geoffrey Crawford version of Ravage possesses immense strength, durability, and leaping, similar to the Hulk, while maintaining his intellect. Additionally, he is knowledgeable and skilled in the field of physics.

The Cormac Crane version of Ravage possesses superhuman strength and is able to manipulate and absorb memories. In addition, he wields a chain weapon that he can use as a whip.

== In other media ==
- Geoffrey Crawford / Ravage appears in Hulk, voiced by Paul Dobson. In the hopes of regaining his mobility and helping the Leader create an army of gamma warriors, Crawford tricks Bruce Banner into allowing him to use a "gamma orb" to absorb his gamma energy, claiming he wants to help cure Banner of the Hulk. Transforming into Ravage, Crawford summons two gamma creatures to assist him in fighting Banner as the Hulk until he is defeated and reverted to normal. Realizing the Leader had manipulated him, Crawford apologizes to Banner, though he later mounts a failed attempt at rebuilding the Orb to become Ravage again.
- Geoffrey Crawford / Ravage appears as an unlockable playable character in Lego Marvel's Avengers.
