= Fall of the Hulks =

2010 Marvel Comics storyline

- Variant cover for Fall of the Hulks Alpha #1, also used as a promotional image. Art by Ed McGuinness
- Publisher: Marvel Comics
- Publication date: December 2009 – April 2010
- Genre: Superhero
Title(s)
Incredible Hulk #606-608
Hulk #18-21
Fall of the Hulks: Alpha
Fall of the Hulks: Gamma
Fall of the Hulks: M.O.D.O.K. #1
Fall of the Hulks: Red Hulk #1-4
Fall of the Hulks: The Savage She-Hulks #1-3
- Main character(s): Hulk; Red Hulk

Creative team
- Writer(s): Hulk; Jeph Loeb; Incredible Hulk; Greg Pak
- Penciller(s): Hulk; Whilce Portacio; Incredible Hulk; Paul Pelletier
- Inker: Danny Miki
- Letterer(s): Hulk; Comicraft; Richard Starkings; Incredible Hulk; Simon Bowland
- Colorist(s): Hulk; Dean White; Incredible Hulk; Frank D'Armata
- Editor(s): Mark Paniccia; Joe Quesada; Hulk; Nathan Cosby; Incredible Hulk; Jordan White
- Fall of The Hulks Prelude: ISBN 0-7851-4315-7
- Hulk Volume 5: Fall Of The Hulks: ISBN 0-7851-3985-0

"Fall of the Hulks" is a 2010 comic book crossover storyline published by Marvel Comics. It ran throughout the ongoing Hulk and Incredible Hulk series, as well as a self-titled limited series; featuring the Hulk and various members of his supporting cast.

== Publication history ==
"Fall of the Hulks" was released between December 2009 and April 2010 by Marvel Comics. A hardcover collection of the issues was released on May 19, 2010.

The story details the supervillain cabal the Intelligencia's evil plot, and the reaction of the various Hulks and supporting characters. This story leads to the storyline called "World War Hulks".

== Issues ==
- Fall of the Hulks: Alpha
- Fall of the Hulks: Gamma
- Fall of the Hulks: Red Hulk #1-4
- Fall of the Hulks: The Savage She-Hulks #1-3
- Hulk #18-21
- Incredible Hulk #606-608
- Fall of the Hulks: M.O.D.O.K. #1

== Plot ==
Red Hulk fights and kills Thunderbolt Ross at the behest of Bruce Banner, with whom he has formed an alliance. Betty Ross and Glenn Talbot (both thought to be dead) attend Ross' funeral. Lyra is later seen in the company of Red She-Hulk and MODOK and has joined their ranks for unknown reasons.

Red Hulk has been running missions in the alliance with Banner — including a trip to a secret A.I.M. base which houses not only cloned bodies of MODOK, but the Cosmic Hulk automaton as well. While trying to destroy the Cosmic Hulk, he accidentally powers it with his own cosmic energy. The Cosmic Hulk makes quick work of A-Bomb and Red Hulk before being called off by the Leader. Red Hulk and Rick Jones return to Banner, reporting on the events that occurred, and Red Hulk reveals to Banner that he has a daughter.

Red Hulk is attacked by A-Bomb, who leaves having managed to obtain what he wanted to know: the agents that took him to an ambulance were working for the Leader and MODOK, how Red Hulk killed Abomination to get his blood, how Marlo Chandler was the one to release him from the base, and how a mental message was left in his mind by Doc Samson to kill Bruce Banner. It is then shown that Banner was the one who told him to attack Red Hulk and after a discussion of why he cannot change back to Rick Jones, the Red Hulk arrives in anger. Rick manages to overcome the message when Banner tells him he is not angry for Rick's involvement in Banner becoming the Hulk, and that it was not Rick's fault.

Lyra, after having her intelligence increased four levels by Bruce Banner, releases Jennifer Walters and explains that she joined the Intelligencia to find her. The two are attacked by Red She-Hulk and afterwards Jennifer tries to convince her to join them, believing she was being manipulated by the Intelligencia; however, she throws them off the Helicarrier base.

After assisting the Fantastic Four, Banner's son Skaar is proclaimed a hero and the city holds a parade in his honor. During the parade, Banner sees his supposedly deceased wife in the crowd. Convinced his wife has come back, Banner teleports to speak to his secret partner, the Red Hulk, warning him that he had better not have had anything to do with his wife's return. The Red Hulk then proceeds to insult Banner, saying he hardly considers him a threat, baiting him and making him angry enough to begin his transformation into the Hulk. However, Banner teleports away to Latveria, where he attacks Doctor Doom. Skaar appears on the scene and takes on Doom, but is overwhelmed and reverted to his young, non-powered form. Doom then explains that the "Hulk" he was fighting was actually the Cosmic Hulk and taunts him that his "rescue" and approaching death at Doom's hands is all for nothing. Just before Doom strikes the final blow, the real Banner teleports in and saves his son. Finally getting to meet his son in his mortal form and mind, Banner tries to connect with him, but Skaar spurns his father's affection and reiterates his desire to someday kill him.

The Avengers are caught up in a struggle with the Red She-Hulk as she attempts to abduct Hank Pym. Banner is attempting to rescue Pym from abduction, but Pym does not trust Banner and fights off his attempts to pull him out. Pym goes toe-to-toe with the Red She-Hulk, who poisons him with a neural anesthetizer and captures him. After Pym's abduction, Banner assembles Korg, A-Bomb, Namor, Spider-Man, Wolverine, and Amadeus Cho to rescue Reed Richards, Pym, Hank McCoy, T'Challa, and Betty Ross from the Intelligencia.

Banner and Red Hulk separately attack the Intelligencia's Helicarrier, while Cho tries to take Betty from Talbot. During the battle, Banner and Skaar are attacked by Lyra. However, much to Skaar's shock, Banner is working with Lyra and launches her four levels up. Banner then informs Skaar that he has been using Skaar and the other heroes to save the day and his wife. Banner promises Skaar that he will get what he wants from him, which Skaar tells Banner is a lie. They are then attacked by Red She-Hulk and Skaar fights her while Banner releases the captured heroes. Skaar is wounded by Red She-Hulk but survives as Banner attacks her. Meanwhile, Cho tries to get Betty from Talbot but she fights back, defending Talbot and rebukes Banner. The Intelligencia uses Red Hulk as a power source to turn several heroes, soldiers and people in Washington into Hulks.

== Collected editions ==
Title	Content	Published date	ISBN
Hulk: Fall of The Hulks Prelude	Hulk (vol. 2) #2, Skaar: Son of Hulk #1, Hulk: Raging Thunder, Planet Skaar Prologue, All-New Savage She-Hulk #4, Hulk (vol. 2) #16 and material from Amazing Fantasy (vol. 2) #15, Hulk (vol. 2) #9, Incredible Hulk #600-601	February 2010	978-0785143154
Hulk Volume 5: Fall Of The Hulks	Fall of the Hulks: Gamma and Hulk (vol. 2) #19-21	June 2010	978-0785139850
Incredible Hulk Volume 2: Fall Of The Hulks	Fall of the Hulks: Alpha and Incredible Hulk #606-608	June 2010	978-0785142522
Hulk: Fall of the Hulks: Red Hulk	Fall Of The Hulks: Red Hulk #1-4 and material from Incredible Hulk #606-608	August 2010	978-0785147954
Hulk: Fall of the Hulks: The Savage She-Hulks	Fall Of The Hulks: The Savage She-Hulks #1-3 and material from Incredible Hulk #600-605	September 2010	978-0785147961
Fall of the Hulks Vol.1	Fall of the Hulks: Alpha, Fall of the Hulks: Gamma, Incredible Hulk #606, Hulk (vol. 2) #19-20 and Fall Of The Hulks: Red Hulk #1	June 2010	978-1846534621
Fall of the Hulks Vol.2	Incredible Hulk #607-608, Hulk (vol. 2) #21, Fall Of The Hulks: The Savage She-Hulks #1-3 and Fall Of The Hulks: Red Hulk #2-4	June 2010	978-1846534638
Incredible Hulks: Fall of the Hulks	Fall of the Hulks: Alpha, Incredible Hulk #601-608, Dark Reign: The List - Hulk, Fall of the Hulks: Red Hulk #1-4, MODOK: Reign Delay, Fall of the Hulks: MODOK	February 2012	978-0785162117
