= Hulk (film) =

2003 American film directed by Ang Lee

- Theatrical release poster
- Directed by: Ang Lee
- Screenplay by: John Turman; Michael France; James Schamus
- Story by: James Schamus
- Based on: Hulk by: Stan Lee; Jack Kirby
- Produced by: Gale Anne Hurd; Avi Arad; James Schamus; Larry Franco
- Starring: Eric Bana; Jennifer Connelly; Sam Elliott; Josh Lucas; Nick Nolte
- Cinematography: Frederick Elmes
- Edited by: Tim Squyres
- Music by: Danny Elfman
- Production companies: Universal Pictures; Marvel Enterprises; Valhalla Motion Pictures; Good Machine
- Distributed by: Universal Pictures
- Release date: June 20, 2003
- Running time: 138 minutes
- Country: United States
- Language: English
- Budget: $137 million
- Box office: $245.3 million

Hulk (also known as The Hulk) is a 2003 American superhero film based on the Marvel Comics character created by Stan Lee and Jack Kirby. The film was directed by Ang Lee and written by John Turman, James Schamus, and Michael France. Eric Bana stars as Bruce Banner and Ang Lee (through motion capture) as Hulk, alongside Jennifer Connelly, Sam Elliott, Josh Lucas, and Nick Nolte. The film explores Bruce Banner's origins. After a lab accident involving gamma radiation, he transforms into a giant green-skinned humanoid with superhuman strength known as the Hulk whenever stressed or emotionally provoked. The United States military pursues him, and he clashes with his biological father.

Development started in 1990. At one time, Joe Johnston and then Jonathan Hensleigh were to direct. Hensleigh, John Turman, Michael France, Zak Penn, J. J. Abrams, Michael Tolkin, David Hayter, and Scott Alexander & Larry Karaszewski wrote more scripts before Ang Lee and James Schamus's involvement. The project was filmed primarily in California from March to August 2002, mainly in the San Francisco Bay Area.

Hulk was released by Universal Pictures on June 20, 2003. The film grossed $245.3 million worldwide and received mixed-to-positive reviews upon release, with reviewers praising the cast's performances and Lee's directing, but criticizing the slow pace and length. It has since received retrospective praise and a cult following for its departure from conventional superhero film tropes. A planned sequel, which would have been released in May 2005, was repurposed as a reboot titled The Incredible Hulk and released on June 13, 2008, as the second film in the Marvel Cinematic Universe.

== Plot ==
In the 1960s, governmental genetics researcher David Banner tries to improve human DNA. His supervisor, Colonel Thaddeus "Thunderbolt" Ross, forbids human experimentation, so David experiments on himself. His wife, Edith, soon gives birth to their son, Bruce Banner. David realizes Bruce inherited his mutant DNA and attempts to find a cure. After discovering his experiments, Ross shuts down David's research; David rigs Desert Base's gamma reactor to explode as revenge. Believing he is dangerous, David tries to kill Bruce but accidentally murders Edith when she gets between them; the trauma makes Bruce suppress his early childhood memories. Ross arrests and sends David to a mental hospital, putting the four-year-old Bruce into foster care. Mrs. Krenzler adopts him, and Bruce assumes the surname, growing up believing both his birth parents are dead.

In the present, Bruce, now an adult, becomes a scientist at the Berkeley Lab with his girlfriend and (now) General Ross's estranged daughter, Betty Ross. Representing the private research company Atheon, the shady Glenn Talbot becomes interested in the scientists' nanomeds research to create regenerating soldiers for the military-industrial complex. David reappears as a janitor in the lab building to infiltrate Bruce's life. Ross investigates, becoming concerned for Betty's safety around Bruce.

Bruce saves a colleague named Harper from an accident with a malfunctioning gammasphere. Bruce wakes in a hospital bed and tells Betty he feels better than ever, but Betty cannot fathom his survival since the nanomeds killed everything else; unknown to them, the radiation merged with Bruce's altered DNA. Later, David meets Bruce, revealing their relationship and hinting at Bruce's mutation. He later uses samples of Bruce's DNA for animal experimentation. Bruce's increasing rage from the tensions around him activates his gamma-radiated DNA; he becomes the Hulk and destroys the lab. Betty finds Bruce unconscious in his home the next morning, barely remembering the previous night. Ross arrives later to question Bruce before Betty locates David to investigate him. After hours of interrogation, Ross seizes the lab and places Bruce under house arrest. David calls Bruce that night, revealing he mutated his three dogs and sicced them on Betty, enraging him. Bemoaning the lab's destruction, Talbot attacks Bruce, who transforms, injuring Talbot and Ross's MPs. The Hulk finds Betty at her forest cabin, saves her from the dogs, and changes back.

Betty calls Ross the following day; the army sedates and takes Bruce to Desert Base. Deeming him doomed to follow in David's footsteps, Ross doubts helping Bruce, but Betty persuades Ross to let her try. David subjects himself to the nanomeds and gammasphere, becoming able to meld with and absorb the properties of anything he touches. Talbot wrestles control from Ross, forcing Betty to return home. Seeking to profit from the Hulk's power, Talbot fails to provoke Bruce and has him put in an isolation tank. David confronts Betty at her house, offering to surrender himself yet asking to speak to Bruce "one last time". Talbot induces a nightmare from Bruce's repressed memories and triggers a transformation, but fails to keep him contained and Hulk escapes. Trapping the Hulk in sticky foam, Talbot tries to take a sample of him, but the Hulk breaks free and knocks Talbot down. Talbot inadvertently kills himself when he fires an explosive round that ricochets off the Hulk, and Ross resumes command. The Hulk escapes the base, battles the army in the desert, and leaps to San Francisco to find Betty. She convinces Ross to take her to the Hulk, returning Bruce to normal.

Bruce and David talk at a base in the city while Ross watches, threatening to incinerate them. David has descended into megalomania, wanting Bruce's power to destroy his enemies. After Bruce refuses, David bites into a high-voltage cable when Ross powers it and absorbs the energy, mutating into a powerful electrical entity. Bruce becomes the Hulk and fights him. The fight leads them to a lake where David tries to absorb the Hulk's power. Bruce then lets David take it, flooding his father with all the rage, anger, and pain that he suffered and transforming him into a gigantic green bubble. Ross orders a Gamma Charge Bomb to end the battle, which destroys David, and Bruce is presumed dead afterwards. A year later, Ross has Betty under constant surveillance, as many Hulk sightings get reported. In exile in the Amazon rainforest, Bruce is alive as a medical camp doctor. His camp gets overrun by soldiers who try to steal their supplies. After Bruce unsuccessfully warns their commander not to make him angry, the Hulk bellows in rage.

== Cast ==
- Eric Bana as Bruce Banner / Hulk:
  A gamma radiation research scientist who, after exposure to elevated gamma radiation levels, transforms into an enormous, green, muscular monster humanoid when enraged or agitated. His size and strength also vary depending on his anger level in this film: the lower limit is 9 ft (2.74 m), his middle limit is 12 ft (3.66 m), and his upper limit is 15 ft (4.57 m). He is legally known as Bruce Krenzler throughout the film. Bana was cast in October 2001, signing for an additional two sequels. Ang Lee felt obliged to cast Bana upon seeing Chopper and first approached the actor in July 2001. Other actors heavily pursued the role. Bana was also in heavy contention for Ghost Rider but lost out to Nicolas Cage. Bana explained, "I was obsessed with the TV show. I was never a huge comic book reader when I was a kid, but I was completely obsessed with the television show." It was widely reported Billy Crudup turned down the role. Johnny Depp and Steve Buscemi were reportedly under consideration for the lead. David Duchovny and Jeff Goldblum auditioned for the role. Edward Norton, who went on to play Bruce in The Incredible Hulk, expressed interest in the role but turned it down as he was disappointed with the script. Tom Cruise was also offered the role but he turned it down.
- Ang Lee as the voice of the Hulk.
- Jennifer Connelly as Betty Ross:
  Bruce's girlfriend and colleague, General Ross's estranged daughter, and possibly the only one who can make the Hulk revert into Bruce. Director Ang Lee attracted Connelly to the role. "He's not talking about a guy running around in green tights and a glossy, fun-filled movie for kids. He's talking along the lines of tragedy and psychodrama. I find it interesting, the green monster of rage and greed, jealousy and fear in all of us." Conelly would eventually provides the voice of Karen AI in Marvel Cinematic Universe (MCU) film Spider-Man: Homecoming.
  - Rhiannon Leigh Wryn as young Betty Ross
- Sam Elliott as Thaddeus "Thunderbolt" Ross:
  A four-star general and Betty's estranged father. Ross was responsible for prohibiting David Banner from his lab work after learning of his dangerous experiments. Elliot said his performance was similar to his portrayal of Basil L. Plumley in We Were Soldiers. Elliott accepted the role without reading the script, being excited to work with Ang Lee, and researched Hulk comic books for the part.
  - Todd Tesen as young Thaddeus Ross
- Josh Lucas as Glenn Talbot:
  A ruthless and arrogant former soldier who has a history with Betty. He offers Bruce and Betty a chance to work for him at the research company Atheon and make self-healing super soldiers.
- Nick Nolte as David Banner:
  Bruce's mentally unstable biological father, who's also a genetics research scientist. He spent several years locked away for causing a gamma reactor explosion and accidentally killing his wife, Edith. David eventually gains absorbing powers, reminiscent of the comic book character Absorbing Man, which first appeared in the film's early scripts. At one point, he also becomes a towering creature composed of electricity, reminiscent of Zzzax, one of the Hulk's enemies in the comic series. Nolte agreed to participate in the film when Lee described the project as a "Greek tragedy".
  - Paul Kersey as young David Banner
- Cara Buono as Edith Banner:
  Bruce's biological mother, whom he cannot remember. She is heard but mostly appears in Bruce's nightmares.
- Celia Weston as Mrs. Krenzler:
  Bruce's adoptive mother, who cared for him after Edith's death and David's incarceration.
- Kevin Rankin as Harper:
  Bruce's colleague, whom he saved from the gamma radiation.

Stan Lee, who co-created Hulk, and Lou Ferrigno, who portrayed the character in the 1970s series, make cameo appearances as security guards. Johnny Kastl and Daniel Dae Kim have small roles as soldiers.

== Production ==
=== Development ===
==== Jonathan Hensleigh ====
Producers Avi Arad and Gale Anne Hurd began developing Hulk in 1990, the same year of the airing of the final television film based on the 1970s television series, The Death of the Incredible Hulk. They set the property up at Universal Pictures in 1992. Michael France and Stan Lee were invited into Universal's offices in 1993, with France writing the script. Universal's concept was to have the Hulk battle terrorists, an idea France disliked. John Turman, a Hulk comic book fan, was brought in to write the script in 1994, getting Lee's approval. Heavily influenced by the Tales to Astonish issues, Turman wrote ten drafts and pitted the Hulk against General Ross, the military, and the Leader, also including Rick Jones and the atomic explosion origin from the comics along with Brian Banner as the explanation for Bruce's inner anger. Universal had mixed feelings over Turman's script, but future screenwriters would use many elements.

Hurd brought her husband Jonathan Hensleigh as co-producer the following year, and Universal hired Industrial Light & Magic (ILM) to create the Hulk with CGI. Universal was courting France once more to write the screenplay but changed when Joe Johnston became the director in April 1997. The studio wanted Hensleigh to rewrite the script due to his successful results on Johnston's Jumanji (1995). Universal fired France before he wrote a single page, but gave him a buy-off. Johnston dropped out of directing in July 1997 in favor of October Sky (1999), and Hensleigh convinced Universal to make the Hulk his directing debut. Universal brought Turman back a second time to write two more drafts. Zak Penn then rewrote it. His script featured a fight between the Hulk and a school of sharks, and two scenes he eventually used for the 2008 film: Banner realizing he cannot have sex, and triggering a transformation by falling out of a helicopter. Hensleigh rewrote from scratch, coming up with a brand new storyline featuring Bruce Banner, who, before the accident which turns him into the Hulk, experiments with gamma-irradiated insect DNA on three convicts, transforming them into "insect men" that cause havoc.

Concept art for Jonathan Hensleigh's script

Filming was to start in December 1997 in Arizona for a mid 1999 release, but filming was pushed back for four months. Hensleigh subsequently rewrote the script with J. J. Abrams. Scott Alexander and Larry Karaszewski were also brought on board to rewrite, with Hensleigh still attached as director. In October 1997, Hulk had entered pre-production with the creation of prosthetic makeup and computer animation already underway. Gregory Sporleder was cast as "Novak", Banner's archenemy, while Lynn Williams was cast as a convict who transforms into a combination of human, ant, and beetle. In March 1998, Universal put Hulk on hiatus due to its escalating $100 million budget and worries of Hensleigh directing his first film. Twenty million dollars was already spent on script development, computer animation, and prosthetics work. Hensleigh immediately went to rewrite the script to reduce the budget.

==== Michael France ====
Hensleigh found the rewriting process too complicated and resigned, saying he "wasted nine months in pre-production". It took another eight months for France to convince Universal and the producers to let him try to write a script for the third time. France claimed, "Someone within the Universal hierarchy wasn't sure if this was a science fiction adventure, or a comedy, and I kept getting directions to write both. I think that at some point when I wasn't in the room, there may have been discussions about turning it into a Jim Carrey or Adam Sandler movie." France was writing the script on the fast track from July to September 1999. Filming for Hulk was to start in April 2000.

France stated his vision of the film was different from the other drafts, which was based on Bruce Banner in his "amiable, nerdy genius" incarnation in the 1960s. France cited inspiration from the 1980s Hulk stories, which introduced Brian Banner, Bruce's abusive father who killed his mother. His script had Banner trying to create cells with regenerative capabilities to convince himself that he is not like his father. However, he has anger management issues before the Hulk is born, which makes everything worse. The "Don't make me angry..." line from the 1970s television series became the dialogue that Banner's father would say before beating his son. Elements such as the "Gammasphere", Bruce and Betty's tragic romance, and the black ops made it to the final film. France turned in his final drafts in late 1999 to January 2000.

==== Ang Lee ====
Michael Tolkin and David Hayter rewrote the script even after the producers' positive response to France's script. Tolkin was brought in January 2000, and Universal brought Hayter in September. Hayter's draft features the Leader, Zzzax, and Absorbing Man as the villains, who are depicted as Banner's colleagues and get caught in the same accident that creates the Hulk. Director Ang Lee and his producing partner James Schamus became involved with the film on January 20, 2001. Lee chose not to direct Terminator 3: Rise of the Machines and instead began work on the film. He was dissatisfied with Hayter's script and commissioned Schamus for a rewrite, merging Banner's father with the Absorbing Man. Lee cited influences from King Kong, Frankenstein, Jekyll and Hyde, Beauty and the Beast, Faust, and Greek mythology to interpret the story. Schamus said he had found the storyline that introduced Brian Banner, allowing Lee to write a drama that again explored father-son themes. Director Ang Lee originally wanted the Hulk to be completely naked, but to maintain a PG-13 rating, he couldn't commit to showing nudity throughout the film, and instead had the Hulk's underwear rip during the fight with the three super dogs.

Schamus was still rewriting the script in October 2001. In early 2002, as filming was underway, France read all the scripts for the Writers Guild of America to determine who would get final credit. France criticized Schamus and Hayter for claiming they were aiming to make Banner a more in-depth character, saddened that they had denigrated their work in interviews. Schamus elected to get solo credit. France said, "James Schamus did a significant amount of work on the screenplay. For example, he brought in the Hulk dogs from the comics, and he made the decision to use Banner's father as a real character in the present. But he used quite a lot of elements from John Turman's scripts and quite a lot from mine, and that's why we were credited." France, Turman, and Schamus received final credit. In December 2001, a theatrical release date for June 20, 2003, was announced, with the title of The Hulk. Schamus admitted that he was worried about making the film after seeing Spider-Man (2002).

=== Filming ===
Filming began on March 18, 2002, in Arizona and moved on April 19 to the San Francisco Bay Area. Locations included Advanced Light Source, Lawrence Berkeley National Laboratory, Oakland, Treasure Island military base, and the sequoia forests of Porterville, before several weeks in the Utah and California deserts. The penultimate battle scene between Hulk and his father used the real Pear Lake in Sequoia National Park as a backdrop. Filming then moved to the Universal backlot in Los Angeles, using Stage 12 for the water tank scene, and finished in the first week of August. Filming of Hulk constituted hiring 3,000 local workers, generating over $10 million in the local economy. Mychael Danna, who previously collaborated with Lee on Ride with the Devil (1999) and The Ice Storm (1997), was set to compose the film score before dropping out. Danny Elfman was then hired.

=== Visual effects and sound design ===
Eric Bana commented that the shoot was "Ridiculously serious... a silent set, morbid in a lot of ways." Lee told him that he was shooting a Greek tragedy and that he would be making a "whole other movie" about the Hulk at Industrial Light & Magic. An example of Lee's arthouse approach to the film was taking Bana to watch a bare-knuckle boxing match. Bana would later disfavorably reflect on his experience making the film, as the majority of the time he was working indoors while the rest of the cast interacted with a CGI recreation of the Hulk, somewhat limiting his screen time. Computer animation supervisor Dennis Muren was on the set every day. One of the many visual images that presented an acting challenge for Bana was Lee's split-screen technique to mimic comic book page panels cinematically. This technique required many more takes of individual scenes than usual. Muren and other ILM animators utilized previous technology originally used for the Dobby character from Harry Potter and the Chamber of Secrets (2002) to create the Hulk with computer-generated imagery. Additional software included PowerAnimator, Softimage 3D, Softimage XSI, and Pixar's RenderMan. ILM started computer animation work in 2001 and completed it in May 2003, just one month before the film's release. Lee provided some motion capture work in post-production. Gary Rydstrom handled sound design at Skywalker Sound.

=== Music ===
Danny Elfman composed the film score for Hulk as a replacement for Mychael Danna, whose score was rejected by the studio executives because it had a non-traditional approach and did not suit the film's tone. Elfman's involvement was confirmed nearly three months ahead of the film's release; he composed over two hours of music within 37 days. The soundtrack album was released on June 17, 2003, by Decca Records; the album features Elfman's score as well as the song "Set Me Free" by Velvet Revolver, which plays during the end credits.

== Release ==
=== Marketing ===
A 70-second teaser trailer debuted in theaters with the release of Spider-Man on May 3, 2002. This trailer was later attached to the home video releases of The Scorpion King. Universal Pictures spent $2.1 million to market the film in a 30-second television spot during Super Bowl XXXVII on January 26, 2003, whch featured the song; "We Luv U". A new trailer would premiere on February 14, 2003, in front of Daredevil's screenings. Another trailer debuted on May 2, 2003 with the opening of X2. Just weeks before the film's release, several workprints leaked on the Internet. Universal launched an investigation for who was responsible for the leak. The public already criticized the story, the visual and special effects, although it was not the film's final editing cut. The film received a novelization written by Hulk comic writer, Peter David. A tie-in video game was developed by Radical Entertainment and released by Vivendi Universal Games on May 28, 2003, and features a narrative that acts as a sequel to the film.

For the promotional campaign, Universal hired Nabisco, Post Consumer Brands, Pepsi, Hershey's, Kraft Foods, Conagra Brands, Glad, and Snack Foods Limited.

=== Home media ===
Hulk was released on VHS and DVD on October 28, 2003. The DVD includes behind-the-scenes footage, enhanced viewing options that allow users to manipulate a 3-D Hulk model, and cast and crew commentaries. The film earned $61.2 million in DVD sales during 2003. Hulk was released on HD DVD on December 12, 2006, on Blu-ray on September 16, 2008, and on Ultra HD Blu-ray on July 9, 2019. Hulk was added to Disney+ in select regions on April 1, 2026 as part of an ongoing content supply deal with NBCUniversal.

== Reception ==
=== Box office ===
Hulk was released on June 20, 2003, grossing $24.3 million during its opening day. On its second day of release, it made $21.3 million. The film then earned $62.1 million in its opening weekend, which made it the 16th-highest-ever opener at the time. It managed to top the box office upon opening, beating out Finding Nemo which also featured Eric Bana. Moreover, it surpassed Austin Powers: The Spy Who Shagged Me to score the biggest June opening weekend. That record would last until 2004 when it was surpassed by Harry Potter and the Prisoner of Azkaban. Hulk went on to score the fourth-highest opening weekend for a Universal film, behind The Lost World: Jurassic Park, The Mummy Returns, and Bruce Almighty. It also achieved the fifth-highest opening weekend for a 2003 film, trailing only behind the latter film, Finding Nemo, X2, and The Matrix Reloaded. Also, the film joined 2 Fast 2 Furious and Bruce Almighty to become one of three Universal films to make $50 million opening weekends. With a second-weekend drop of 70%, it was the first opener above $20 million to drop over 65%. At the time, the film had the second-highest second-weekend decline of any superhero film, behind Steel. It eventually made $18.8 million during its second weekend, ranking in second place below Charlie's Angels: Full Throttle. The film grossed $132.2 million in North America on a budget of $137 million. It made $113.2 million in foreign countries, coming to a worldwide total of $245.4 million. With a final North American gross of $132.2 million, it became the largest opener not to earn $150 million.

Internationally, Hulk had box office runs in several countries. It made $3.1 million from five Asian countries during its opening weekend, scoring a Hong Kong opening of $700,000 while doubling Gladiator. It grossed $122,000 in Malaysia, making it the country's second-highest opening of a Universal film, after The Lost World: Jurassic Park. In the UK, the film had made $5.6 million during its opening weekend, combined with $2.1 million from previews. In Mexico, Hulk became Universal's biggest opening in the country, generating $4.6 million and surpassing Jurassic Park III. In total, the international grosses include Argentina ($1.2 million), Australia ($6.4 million), France ($9.6 million), Germany ($4.1 million), Italy ($8 million), Japan ($7.6 million), Mexico ($11.6 million), South Korea ($2.5 million), Spain ($7.7 million), Taiwan ($3.7 million), and the United Kingdom ($13.9 million).

=== Critical response ===
Metacritic review
breakdown (unweighted)

Positive
19 (48%)
Mixed
16 (40%)
Negative
5 (13%)

Upon opening, Hulk received mixed-to-positive reviews from critics. On review aggregator Rotten Tomatoes, Hulk holds a 63% approval rating based on 237 reviews and an average rating of 6.2/10. The website's critics' consensus reads, "While Ang Lee's ambitious film earns marks for style and an attempt at dramatic depth, there's ultimately too much talking and not enough smashing." Metacritic, which uses a weighted average, assigned the film a score of 54 out of 100 based on 40 critics, indicating "mixed or average" reviews. Audiences polled by CinemaScore gave the film an average grade of "B−" on an A+ to F scale.

Roger Ebert of The Chicago Sun-Times gave a positive review and rated Hulk three stars out of four, explaining, "Ang Lee is trying to actually deal with the issues in the story of the Hulk, instead of simply cutting to brainless visual effects." Ebert also liked the performances, the innovative editing, and appreciated how the Hulk's movements resembled the stop-motion effects in the 1930s film King Kong. Although Peter Travers of Rolling Stone felt Hulk should have been shorter, he heavily praised the action sequences, especially the climax and cliffhanger. Paul Clinton of CNN believed the cast gave strong performances, but in an otherwise positive review, criticized the computer-generated imagery, calling the Hulk "a ticked-off version of Shrek".

Mick LaSalle of the San Francisco Chronicle considered "the film is more thoughtful and pleasing to the eye than any blockbuster in recent memory, but its epic length comes without an epic reward." Ty Burr of The Boston Globe felt "Jennifer Connelly reprises her stand-by-your-messed-up-scientist turn from A Beautiful Mind." Lisa Schwarzbaum of Entertainment Weekly stated, "a big-budget comic-book adaptation has rarely felt so humorless and intellectually defensive about its own pulpy roots."

Hulk received retrospective praise from critics for its artistic difference from other superhero films such as those by Marvel and DC comics. In 2012, Matt Zoller Seitz cited it as one of the few big-budget superhero films that "really departed from formula, in terms of subject matter or tone", writing that the film is "pretty bizarre... in its old-school Freudian psychology, but interesting for that reason". In Scout Tafoya's 2016 video essay on another film directed by Ang Lee, Ride with the Devil, he mentioned Hulk as "Lee's ill-fated but quietly soulful and deeply sad adaptation of The Incredible Hulk comics". In 2018, Peter Sobczynski of RogerEbert.com wrote that the film is "a genuinely great example of cinematic pop art that deserves a reappraisal". One article calls it a "road not taken" in comic book adaptations. The author praised Popeye, Dick Tracy, and Hulk for their use of comic techniques such as "masking, paneling, and page layout" in ways the DC Extended Universe and Marvel Cinematic Universe do not.

=== Accolades ===
Connelly and Danny Elfman received nominations at the 30th Saturn Awards with Best Actress and Best Music. The film was nominated for Best Science Fiction Film but lost out to X2, another film based on Marvel characters. Dennis Muren, Michael Lantieri, and the special effects crew were nominated for Best Special Effects.

Award	Category	Nominee	Result
30th Saturn Awards	Best Science Fiction Film	Hulk	Nominated
30th Saturn Awards	Best Actress	Jennifer Connelly	Nominated
30th Saturn Awards	Best Music	Danny Elfman	Nominated
30th Saturn Awards	Best Special Effects	Dennis Muren, Michael Lantieri	Nominated

== Future ==
=== Cancelled sequel ===
In March 2002, during filming for Hulk, producer Avi Arad targeted a May 2005 theatrical release date for a sequel. Upon the film's release, screenwriter James Schamus started to plan a sequel featuring Hulk's Grey Hulk persona and considered using the Leader and the Abomination as villains. Marvel asked for Abomination's inclusion to be an actual threat to Hulk, unlike General Ross. Schamus envisioned the sequel to take place on a Native American reservation and stating it was "Very radioactive and very political". He would later walk away from the project. The project ultimately never launched due to Universal's failure to meet the 2004 deadline to begin filming.

=== Marvel Cinematic Universe ===
In January 2006, Marvel Studios reacquired the film rights to the character, and writer Zak Penn began work on a sequel titled The Incredible Hulk. However, Edward Norton rewrote Penn's script after signing on to star, retelling the origin story in flashbacks and revelations, to establish the film as a reboot; director Louis Leterrier agreed with this approach. Leterrier acknowledged that the only remaining similarity between the two films was Bruce hiding in South America.

In 2021, amid rumors of Tobey Maguire and Andrew Garfield returning to reprise their respective versions of Spider-Man alongside Tom Holland in Spider-Man: No Way Home, Bana was interviewed by Jake Hamilton to promote his new film The Dry (2020). When asked if he would be willing to reprise his role as his version of Bruce Banner in a future MCU project alongside Mark Ruffalo's version of the character, Bana replied:

When I went and did that film, I mean, that was kind of, like, pre-Marvel universe, right? That universe didn't even really exist. So, it always just felt like a one-time film for me, y'know? That world of, 'You go off and do a movie, and there are gonna be sequels, and you're going to be doing it for a bit.' That, actually, that framework didn't even exist back then. So I guess the answer, the short answer, is no, I never felt like it was something I was going to reprise or do again and I still feel, I mean after all this time, that's definitely... yeah, I can't see that happening.
