= List of Marvel Comics characters: O =

== Rose O'Hara ==
Rose O'Hara is a character appearing in Marvel Comics. She first appeared in Origin #1 (September 2001), and was created by Bill Jemas, Paul Jenkins, Joe Quesada and Andy Kubert. She is a friend of Wolverine. An orphan servant on the Howlett estate in the late 19th century located in Alberta, Canada, Rose is a friend of James Howlett. After Thomas Logan's death, James runs away with Rose. Rose and James travel to the north of Canada, ending up in a small mining community deep within Canada. After several years, James feels very attracted towards Rose but these romantic feelings are not mutual. Dog Logan tracks down James and Rose, with Rose being killed in the ensuing battle after James inadvertently stabs her.

== Blackjack O'Hare ==
- Further reading: Blackjack O'Hare at the Comic Book DB (archived from the original); Blackjack O'Hare at the Grand Comics Database

Blackjack O'Hare is a character appearing in American comic books published by Marvel Comics. The character, created by Bill Mantlo and Sal Buscema, first appeared in The Incredible Hulk #271 (May 1982).

Blackjack O'Hare is an anthropomorphic rabbit who is a mercenary and leader of the Black Bunny Brigade. He was hired by Judson Jakes and Lord Dyvyne to kidnap Lylla, the C.E.O. of Mayhem Mekaniks. He planned on betraying his employers by marrying Lylla and inheriting the company, but was found out. He was rescued by Rocket Raccoon and after a series of incidents that caused him to question his own loyalty, he aided Rocket in defeating the tyrants and left with his new friends to start a new life.

=== Blackjack O'Hare in other media ===
- Blackjack O'Hare appears in the Guardians of the Galaxy episode "We Are Family", voiced by David Sobolov.
- Blackjack O'Hare appears in Rocket & Groot.
- Blackjack O'Hare appears in the Marvel Super Hero Adventures episode "The Claws of Life", voiced by Sam Vincent.
- A character based on Blackjack O'Hare named Floor appears in Guardians of the Galaxy Vol. 3, voiced by Mikaela Hoover. This version is a white rabbit who was experimented on by the High Evolutionary and possesses genetic and cybernetic enhancements. She is killed by the Evolutionary during a failed attempt to escape his captivity.

== Oblivion ==
Oblivion is a cosmic entity associated with the concept of the primordial void that the Marvel Multiverse sprang from and will eventually return to.

== Oddball ==
Oddball is the name of two supervillains appearing in American comic books published by Marvel Comics.

=== Elton Healey ===
Oddball

Publication information
- Publisher: Marvel Comics
- First appearance: Hawkeye #3 (Nov 1983)
- Created by: Mark Gruenwald

In-story information
- Alter ego: Elton Healey
- Team affiliations: Death-Throws; Masters of Evil
- Abilities: Expert juggler Experienced street fighter

Elton Healey was born in Reno, Nevada. Along with his brother Alvin, Elton spent years as a street performer, becoming a master juggler. He also learned how to become a capable street fighter. Using these skills, Elton became the juggling supervillain Oddball, adopting the name because of his loony nature. With Bombshell, Tenpin, Knicknack, and Ringleader, Oddball forms the Death-Throws, a team of supervillain jugglers. Oddball was killed while participating in the Bloodsport competition in Madripoor.

=== Orville Bock ===
Orville Bock became the new Oddball and joined the Death-Throws. Oddball joined the rest of the Death-Throws in London after they were hired by R.A.I.D to take part in a terrorist attack on the city. They were subsequently defeated by Union Jack and Sabra.

=== Powers and abilities ===
Oddball is an expert at juggling, pitching, and catching, with superb coordination, and is highly skilled with thrown objects. He normally carries an assortment of weighted balls and ball-shaped throwing weapons. He typically carried ten 3-inch (76 mm) diameter balls filled with various substances: tear gas, super-adhesive, hydrochloric acid, smoke, concentrated sulfur, spent uranium, itching powder, magnesium flare, a powerful impact-activated electromagnet, a powerful impact-activated siren, or other juggling balls with more exotic contents. He also carried marbles used to trip foes. Oddball has extensive experience in street fighting techniques.

=== Oddball in other media ===
Oddball appears in The Amazing Spider-Man and Captain America in Dr. Doom's Revenge!.

== Ogre ==
Ogre (Brian Dunlap) is a character appearing in American comic books published by Marvel Comics. Created by writer Roy Thomas and artist Werner Roth, the character first appeared in X-Men #28 (January 1967). He has been affiliated with the teams Factor Three and the Thunderbolts. While Ogre is depicted as ugly and ape-like fitting to his moniker, he is a regular human with great technological ability.

Ogre is introduced as a member of Factor Three. When Factor Three disbands, Ogre remains behind in Mount Charteris, one of their many mountain bases. Over the years, the base is occupied by Hydra, the Sons of the Serpent, and the Masters of Evil. After taking Charteris as their base, the Thunderbolts encounter Ogre and convince him that they mean no harm, with Hawkeye offering him membership.

== Ogress ==
Ogress is a character appearing in American comic books published by Marvel Comics.

Diane Davids was a criminal defense lawyer and a resident of Middletown, an isolated desert town, which the Hulk's archenemy Leader chooses as the target of an experiment in which he exposes it to gamma radiation. He hopes some of its inhabitants would survive and join him in his new kingdom of Freehold. Diane is one of five people to survive the radiation and gains green skin and superhuman strength. The five founded the Riot Squad and serve the Leader, with Diana assuming the codename Ogress.

=== Ogress in other media ===
Ogress appears in The Incredible Hulk (1996), voiced by Kathy Ireland.

== Jake Oh ==
Jake Oh is a character appearing in American comic books published by Marvel Comics. The character, created by Greg Pak and Tyler Kirkham, first appeared in Agents of Atlas #1 (August 2006). He is an agent of S.H.I.E.L.D. who is of Korean American descent.

== Okkara ==
Okkara, originally known as Grove, was a mutant from the first generation of mutants, who belonged to a thriving society known as Threshold. Two billion years ago, the first generation of mutants belonged to a thriving society known as Threshold, a civilization in which mutants and humans—known as the Enriched and Enshrined, respectively—lived in harmony. Among them was Grove, a mutant who could heal herself through vegetative growth.

After Grove was injured in battle, she was healed by her mutant powers, transforming into a tree-like humanoid. She renamed herself Okkara and survived the fall of the Threshold, eventually growing into an island. Okkara became the home for the second generation of mutants, led by Apocalypse and Genesis. Okkara was later attacked by Annihilation, who used their sword to split her in two. The two halves of Okkara became the living islands Krakoa and Arakko.

== Omega ==
=== Inhuman ===
Omega is a gigantic humanoid creation of Maximus which draws upon psionic power from the racial hatred of the Inhumans towards the Alpha Primitives, and converts that power into strength.

Later, Ultron betrayed Maximus and placed his computer-mind within an enlarged adamantium head and transplanted it atop Omega's body. In this form, Ultron attacked the Avengers, Fantastic Four, and Inhumans.

== Omertà ==
Omertà

Publication information
- Publisher: Marvel Comics
- First appearance: Uncanny X-Men #392 (March 2001)
- Created by: Scott Lobdell; Salvador Larroca

In-story information
- Alter ego: Paul "Paulie" Provenzano
- Species: Human Mutant
- Team affiliations: Genoshan Assault X-Men; United States Marine Corps
- Abilities: Invulnerability; Superhuman strength

Omertà (Paul "Paulie" Provenzano) is a mutant appearing in American comic books published by Marvel Comics. He first appeared during the Eve of Destruction storyline in Uncanny X-Men #392 (March 2001).

After being discharged from the United States Marines, Paulie Provenzano returned home to Brooklyn and attempted to join the Mafia. Discovering he was a mutant, the Mafia rejected him and attempted to kill him, though Paulie easily subdued his attackers. Soon after, Jean Grey recruits Paulie to rescue the rest of the X-Men from Magneto. After the battle, he declined an offer to remain with the team and left the X-Mansion.

Omertà is later captured by the Weapon X program and interned at the Neverland concentration camp. He is executed after his powers are deemed useless for exploitation by the program.

Following the establishment of Krakoa as a mutant nation, Omertà is resurrected. He entered into a relationship with Stinger and had a child with her.

=== Powers and abilities of Omertà ===
Omertà is virtually invulnerable. His invulnerability protected him from Magneto's attempt to manipulate the iron in his blood, though he could still be lifted into the air. However, with enough force, he can be hurt and made to bleed. Omertà is also superhumanly strong, able to lift roughly one ton with ease.

== The One ==
The One (Shu-Hu) is a fictional android appearing in American comic books published by Marvel Comics. Created by Roy Thomas and Gil Kane, it first appeared in Marvel Premiere #15 (May 1974).

Shu-Hu's creation was secretly mandated by Yu-Ti of K'un-L'un to fix the outcome of the Challenge of the One that every Iron Fist underwent after taking the chi of Shou-Lao. As technology was forbidden in K'un-L'un, Yu-Ti covered up his involvement by discarding the One outside of the city and had its creator Fooh exiled. After years of wandering, Shu-Hu finds and absorbs the body of Danny's father Wendell to repair itself. The One comes to believe that it is Wendell and becomes obsessed with resurrecting his wife Heather.

The One and Steel Serpent travel to New York City and attempt to resurrect Heather Rand, but inadvertently summon the god Zhu Rong, who attacks the city out of anger for the One's actions. The One sacrifices itself by transferring its chi to Danny for him to defeat the god.

== One-Above-All ==
- First appearance: Fantastic Four #511 (May 2004)
- Created by: Mark Waid, Mike Wieringo
- Species: N/A
- Abilities: Omnipotent, omniscient, omnitemporal, and omnipresent
- Aliases: Above All Others, God
- Further reading: One-Above-All at the Comic Book DB (archived from the original); One-Above-All at the Grand Comics Database

The One-Above-All is a character who was created by Mark Waid and Mike Wieringo and first appeared in Fantastic Four #511. In his few appearances, he took the appearance of Jack Kirby, which may suggest he is the representation of the actual comic-book writers inside the Marvel Multiverse.

The One-Above-All is the sole creator of all existence in the Marvel Multiverse. He is also the supervisor of the Living Tribunal.

== One Below All ==
- First appearance: The Immortal Hulk #5 (November 2018)
- Created by: Al Ewing, Joe Bennett
- Abilities: Omnipotent and omniscient as the evil manifestation of the One-Above-All
- Aliases: Breaker of Worlds

The One Below All is the "dark reflection" or evil manifestation of the One-Above-All. Created by Al Ewing and Joe Bennett, he first appeared in The Immortal Hulk #5 in the form of Bruce Banner's father, Brian Banner, his agent. Alluded to as the qlippoth, or "Hulk", of God, the One Below All is a malevolent and destructive force and the source of gamma radiation-based mutations in the Marvel universe.

The One Below All resides in the Below Place, the lowest layer of Hell, which is kept behind a metaphysical 'Green Door'. All gamma mutates can resurrect after death by traveling through the Door.

The One Below All's origin is expanded upon in Incredible Hulk #29 (September 2025), in which Hulk is told how the One-Above-All was created. During a conflict between an avatar of the One-Above-All and the Mother of Horrors (Vinruviel), the One-Above-All was hit by a corrupting attack only referred to as 'the dark'. The dark transformed the One-Above-All into a destructive and enraged version of himself subsequently called the One Below All. The One Below All took revenge against the Mother of Horrors by killing her children and imprisoning her in a place only he could open. The One Above All returned to normal, but the One Below All remained as his dark reflection.

== Onyxx ==
Onyxx

Publication information
- Publisher: Marvel Comics
- First appearance: X-Men (vol. 2) #171 (August 2005)
- Created by: Peter Milligan (writer); Salvador Larroca (artist)

In-story information
- Alter ego: Sidney Green
- Species: Human mutant
- Team affiliations: Chevaliers; Xavier Institute; X-Men-In-Training
- Abilities: Superhuman strength and durability

Onyxx (Sidney Green) is a mutant character appearing in comic books published by Marvel Comics. Onyxx first appeared in X-Men (vol. 2) #171 (August 2005), and was created by Peter Milligan and Salvador Larroca.

As a child, Sidney Green lived in various foster homes and orphanages. He is enrolled at the Xavier Institute after his mutation transforms him into a golem-like form. He joins Gambit's training squad, the Chevaliers.

Onyxx is one of 198 mutants who retain their powers after M-Day, when the Scarlet Witch removes the powers of most mutants on Earth. He continues to live at the Xavier Institute.

Onyxx, along with fellow students Mercury and Loa, is tasked with keeping peace in Telegraph Hill, San Francisco following a riot by the anti-mutant group Humanity Now. After the riots subside, Cyclops comes and picks the three up, taking them to City Hall.

In the storyline Necrosha, Onyxx is killed by Wither, who disintegrates his body. Long after his death, Onyxx is resurrected following the establishment of Krakoa as a mutant nation.

== Oracle ==
Oracle is the name of several characters appearing in American comic books published by Marvel Comics.

=== Captain America villain ===
A man calling himself Oracle is an astronomer who worked at a planetarium. He and his henchmen planned to rob the charity money only to be stopped by Jeffrey Mace and Fred Davis Jr. in their superhero identities of Captain America and Bucky.

=== Inhuman version ===
Oracle is a telepathic member of the Inhumans. He would act as an interpreter for Black Bolt where he would relay his messages upon being touched by him. Oracle was first seen helping Black Bolt judge the fate of Aireo, Falcona, Leonus, Nebulo, Stallior, and Timberius. When Hulk arrived at the Great Refuge, Gorgon asked Oracle to reveal the location of Hulk only for Oracle to turn him down since he answers to Black Bolt. Black Bolt arrived as Oracle witnessed him facing off against his brother Maximus. After Hulk defeated Maximus and his Inhuman allies, Oracle was the one who offered peace to Hulk and an offer to reside at the Great Refuge per the desire of Black Bolt. Hulk declined the offer and left.

=== Sybil ===
- First appearance: X-Men #107 (October 1977)
- Created by: Chris Claremont and Dave Cockrum
- Species: Shi'ar
- Teams: Imperial Guard
- Abilities: Telepathy; Mind control; Projection of stun bolts; Psychoscopic awareness ("Mind-Sight": the ability to expand her over-consciousness to read the impressions left by events in the fabric of time and matter)
- Aliases: Lady Sybil

Oracle (Lady Sybil) is a Shi'ar who is a member of the Shi'ar Imperial Guard. The character, created by writer Chris Claremont and artist Dave Cockrum, first appeared in X-Men #107 (October 1977). Oracle has telepathy and can exert control over others' minds. Using this power, she can project stunning bolts. She also has psychoscopic awareness, or "Mind-Sight": the ability to expand her consciousness to read the impressions left by events in the fabric of time and matter. Like many original members of the Imperial Guard, Oracle is the analog of a character from DC Comics' Legion of Super-Heroes: in her case Saturn Girl.

=== Enhanced member ===
Oracle is a member of the Enhanced who has also gone by the name Warbird.

=== Oracle in other media ===
The Imperial Guard incarnation of Oracle appears in X-Men: The Animated Series.

== Ismael Ortega ==
Ismael Ortega

Publication information
- Publisher: Marvel Comics
- First appearance: District X #1
- Created by: David Hine and David Yardin

In-story information
- Alter ego: Ismael "Izzy" Ortega
- Team affiliations: NYPD
- Notable aliases: Officer 15294
- Abilities: none; baseline human.

Ismael "Izzy" Ortega is a character appearing in American comic books published by Marvel Comics. The character was created by David Hine and David Yardin and debuted in the series District X, where he was partnered with the X-Man Bishop.

Ismael Ortega is a New York City police officer that was stationed in Mutant Town along with his partner Gus Kucharsky. After an accident where a mutant woman uses her powers of persuasion to have Gus kill her husband and herself, Izzy begins working with Bishop.

== Emily Osborn ==
- Further reading: Emily Osborn at the Comic Book DB (archived from the original); Emily Osborn at the Grand Comics Database

Emily Osborn (née Lyman) is a supporting character in Marvel Comics. The character, created by J. M. DeMatteis and Sal Buscema, first appeared (as a photo) in The Spectacular Spider-Man #180 (September 1991). She was Norman Osborn's wife and Harry Osborn's mother.

Emily was apparently the only person that Norman ever showed love to, but their son's birth had weakened her with her dying sometime after. However, Emily turns up alive, having faked her death and become Normie Osborn and Stanley Osborn's nanny.

=== Emily Osborn in other media ===
- A character loosely based on Emily Osborn named Caroline Mulder appears in a photograph in Spider-Man. According to Norman, she was a gold digger and abandoned their marriage prior to the events of the film.
- Emily Osborn makes non-speaking appearances in The Spectacular Spider-Man.
- Emily Osborn appears in Spider-Man: Turn Off the Dark.
- Emily Osborn appears in Spider-Man (2018). This version died prior to the game's events from the neurological Oshtoran syndrome, which Harry inherited. Norman's work to find a cure led to the development of the Devil's Breath virus and use of the Venom symbiote.
- Emily Osborn appears in Spider-Man 2, voiced by an uncredited actress. Harry starts the Emily-May Foundation in her and May Parker's memory and offers Peter a job there. After bonding to Venom, Harry visits Emily's grave and the symbiote mimics her voice when urging him to spread the symbiote's influence around the world.

== Overlord ==
The ruler of the planet Dakkam in the 45th century, Rakkhal, known as the Overlord, is an immensely powerful mutant who has destroyed almost all life in the universe. He appears in Silver Surfer Vol. I#6. The Silver Surfer encounters the Overlord after travelling through time in an unsuccessful attempt to escape his imprisonment on Earth. After discovering the destruction sown by the Overlord, the Surfer travels through time again and stops the nuclear accident that caused the existence of the Overlord, preventing him from being born.

== Overrider ==
Overrider (Richard Rennselaer) is a mutant in the Marvel Comics universe. His first appearance was in Captain America Annual #8.

Richard Rennselaer is a former S.H.I.E.L.D. agent whose son developed psychosis due to a fear of nuclear destruction. Desperate to help his son, Rennselaer steals the experimental robot TESS-One - part of a 1939 project dubbed Total Elimination of Super-Soldiers which was intended to be a failsafe against the Super Soldier program. Overrider attacks a nuclear command facility to steal its nuclear missiles, intending to get rid of them by launching them into the ocean. Overrider is stopped by Captain America and Wolverine and taken into custody. Overrider lost his powers after the events of M-Day.

== Overtime ==
Overtime is a character appearing in American comic books published by Marvel Comics.

Hector Bautista was a Texan who was incarcerated for a murder he did not commit. Before Bautista could be executed, the Time Gem bound to him and he used its abilities to escape from prison.

== Ozymandias ==
Ozymandias is an ancient Egyptian warlord, and brother of Nephri. He used to work for Rama-Tut and was enslaved by Apocalypse who transformed Ozymandias's body into a rock-skinned form that gave him immortality, regeneration, matter animation, flight, and pseudo-precognition.

=== Ozymandias in other media ===
- Ozymandias appears in the X-Men '97 episode "Days of Past Future", voiced by Tony Amendola.
- Ozymandias appears in Marvel Snap.
