= Madman (Marvel Comics) =

Philip Sterns Madman
- Madman as depicted in The Incredible Hulk #409 (September 1993). Art by Gary Frank (penciller), Cam Smith (inker), and Glynis Oliver (colorist).

Publication information
- Publisher: Marvel Comics
- First appearance: (As Phil Sterns); The Incredible Hulk #362 (November 1989) (As Madman); The Incredible Hulk #364 (mid-December 1989)
- Created by: Peter David (writer); Jeff Purves (artist)

In-story information
- Full name: Dr. Philip "Phil" Sterns
- Species: Human gamma-mutate
- Partnerships: Leader
- Abilities: Superhuman strength and durability; Size manipulation; High intelligence; Density control; Shapeshifting

Madman (Philip Sterns) is a supervillain appearing in American comic books published by Marvel Comics. Created by writer Peter David and artist Jeff Purves, the character first appeared in The Incredible Hulk vol. 2 #362 (November 1989). He is the brother of the Leader, and an enemy of the Hulk.

== Publication history ==
Philip Sterns debuted in The Incredible Hulk vol. 2 #362 (November 1989), and as the Madman in The Incredible Hulk vol. 2 #364, created by Peter David and Jeff Purves.

== Fictional character biography ==
A former classmate of Bruce Banner at the California Institute of Technology, Sterns possesses a love/hate obsession with Hulk, originating from his envy and fascination with his former peer. In an attempt to emulate the Hulk, Sterns exposes himself to gamma radiation, transforming into a monster with abnormal strength and developing multiple personality disorder.

Calling himself the Madman, Sterns hatches a plot to kill the Hulk by injecting him with a poison that rapidly deteriorates his body. Samuel Sterns, the Leader and Phil's brother, comes to aid the Hulk so he can help him track down the Madman for an antidote. In the ensuing battle, the Hulk manages to cure himself and poison the Madman, leaving the cure to the poison just out of reach.

Later, the Madman revealed that he simply increased his mass to grab it and recovered in time. He masquerades as a researcher in the Red Skull's "New World Order" organization. Here, he helped to engineer the transformation of a captured S.H.I.E.L.D. agent into the power-mimicking creature Piecemeal.

In the series Thunderbolts, the Madman resurfaces and has been seen supplying gamma technology on the island of Kata Jaya. He encounters Red Hulk's incarnation of the Thunderbolts and is killed by the Leader.

== Powers and abilities ==
Like the Hulk, the Madman has immense strength and durability. He is unable to grow in strength further, but possesses additional shapeshifting abilities. He is also a gifted genius, with knowledge of nuclear physics and robotics.

== In other media ==
- Philip Sterns / Madman appears as a boss in Hulk, voiced by Paul Dobson.
- Philip Sterns / Madman makes a non-speaking appearance in The Avengers: Earth's Mightiest Heroes episode "Hulk vs. the World" as an inmate of the Cube.
