= Riot Squad (comics) =

Marvel supervillain

Publication information
- Publisher: Marvel Comics
- First appearance: The Incredible Hulk (vol. 2) #345 (July 1988)
- Created by: Peter David; Todd McFarlane; Jeff Purves

In-story information
- Member(s): Hotshot; Jailbait; Ogress; Omnibus; Redeemer; Rock; Soul Man

The Riot Squad is a supervillain team appearing in American comic books published by Marvel Comics. They are often depicted as enemies of Hulk.

== Publication history ==
The Riot Squad first appeared in The Incredible Hulk (vol. 2) #345 and was created by Peter David, Todd McFarlane, and Jeff Purves.

== Fictional team history ==
When Leader detonated a gamma bomb in Middletown, Arizona, only a few of its population near 5,000 survived and were all mutated into gamma monsters. Some of the survivors consisting of Hotshot, Jailbait, Ogress, Omnibus, and Soul Man came together with Rock and Redeemer to form the Riot Squad. They became the protectors of Leader's base Freehold and protected it at the time when Leader had a terminal illness. They first clashed with Hulk when Leader would provide him the information on where Betty Ross is in exchange that Hulk kills Madman.

The Riot Squad later battle the forces of Hydra when they invade Leader's base. During the battle, Soul Man is killed and the Leader is presumed dead. Omnibus takes over the Leader's position in the Riot Squad. Not being content with the Freeholders' peaceful existence and apparently possessed by the Leader's consciousness, Omnibus manipulates Matt Talbot and others in the U.S. government to his own ends. Omnibus' compatriots learn that he is responsible for worldwide bombings in the name of the fictitious terrorists of the "Alliance" and work with the Avengers to shut down Omnibus' remaining bombs. The rest of the Riot Squad judge Omnibus guilty and sentence him to death. Omnibus is abandoned in the Arctic, where he is killed by a polar bear.

Hotshot resurfaces when it is revealed that Jailbait is dead after losing control of her powers and Hotshot has started to lose his mind. He held a church hostage to get a priest to read the last rites for Jailbait. Hulk broke into the church and defeated Hotshot, who was arrested by the police. Still losing his mind over Jailbait's death, Hotshot hanged himself in his jail cell. It was later revealed that Jailbait lost control of her powers because she was possessed by Brian Banner's ghost who was enthralled by the One Below All.

== Members ==
- Rock – Samuel LaRoquette was an African-American born to a low-income inner city family. This fueled his desire to see the natural world, where he grew into an explorer who survived all of Earth's ecosystems, then gained an academic career with that acclaim. However, he became sexually involved with a student and angrily punched the university dean when confronted about this. He then got a job with Argo Industries, but his headstrong attitude during a petroleum expedition overruled recommendations to retreat, where an earthquake killed two of his men. LaRoquette finally joined Hulkbusters along with Craig Saunders, but both men struggled with amnesia after Nick Fury shut down the unit, and they eventually fell in with Samuel Sterns. Leader coated his body with pliable stone, giving his body a near-indestructible exoskeleton. His name "Rock" referred to his earlier love of nature, as well as the opposite of his unchecked prior temper.
- Redeemer – Craig Saunders Jr. was recruited by S.H.I.E.L.D. as an advisor alongside Sam LaRoquette when they were manipulated by the Leader into becoming his brainwashed pawn. He originally was a U.S. Army officer specializing in explosive ordnance disposal. Perchance at an airport terminal, he detected a terrorist bomb hidden in an unattended briefcase and kicked it into a ladies' room, failing to realize a young woman and her infant daughter were inside when it detonated. The resulting bad publicity ruined Saunders' military career, and he hoped to atone for his mistake by joining the Hulkbusters, hence his name "Redeemer".
- Hotshot – Louis Lembert is a high school athlete and the boyfriend of Jessie Harrison. He was mutated by the gamma bomb and sported green skin and yellow hair as well as the ability to project energy bolts from his hands. When his girlfriend's powers got out of control, Hotshot had no choice but to kill her to save his fellow Riot Squad members. He was later taken into police custody, but committed suicide in his jail cell out of grief for killing Jailbait.
- Jailbait – Jessica Harrison was the girlfriend of Louis Lembert. She was mutated by the gamma bomb and sported green skin and the ability to create energy cages within her line of sight. Prior to her transformation, Jessica was a teenager in an unauthorized relationship with the slightly older Louis and had planned to elope with him to flee her parents (who were killed in the blast). Jailbait's powers eventually grow out of control, causing her to threaten both her allies and enemies. In response, Louis kills her.
- Ogress – Diana Davids is a lawyer who was mutated by the gamma bomb which gave her green skin and superhuman strength and invulnerability.
- Omnibus – Burt Horowitz is a traveling encyclopedia salesman who was mutated by the gamma bomb and gained green skin and a tall head. He possesses superhuman intelligence and "any super-power he already believes he has."
- Soul Man – Jason McCall is a priest who was mutated by the gamma bomb and gained green skin. In later appearances, he reverted to his original skin color. Prior to his transformation, Jason was due to stand trial for embezzlement of tithing funds of the church he ministered. Soul Man possesses near-omnipotence and the ability to resurrect the dead, but he must keep his concentration to do so.
