= John Turman (writer) =

American screenwriter and author

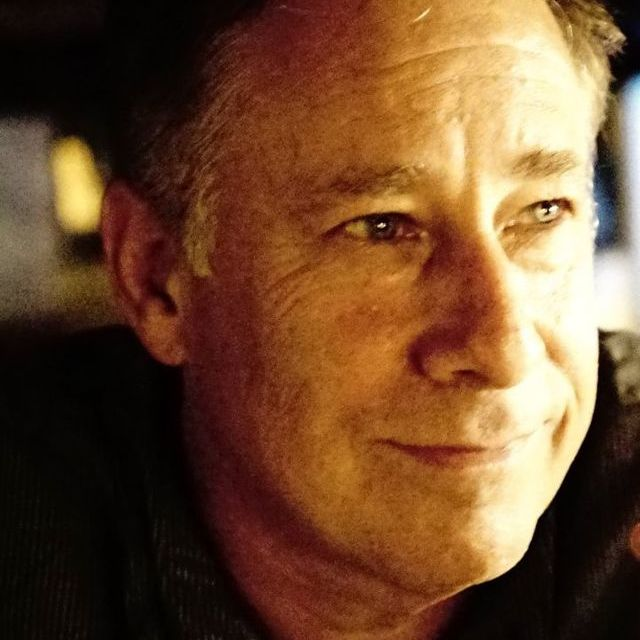
- Born: Los Angeles, California
- Education: University of Colorado (BA); UCLA Law School
- Known for: Hulk; Fantastic Four: Rise of the Silver Surfer

John Turman is an American screenwriter and author, known for his work on Marvel Comics film adaptions.

While working as a storyboard artist, Turman pitched Hulk to Universal and Marvel's Stan Lee.with much success, and he began working with producer Gale Ann Hurd on the project. His original screenplay drafts, featuring Hulk pitted against The Leader, and significantly Banner's own father, formed the spine of the 2003 film for which Turman received screenplay credit with Michael France and James Schamus. Turman was hired to write screenplays for Iron Fist,. He was a writer and consultant on the syndicated TV series The Crow: Stairway to Heaven, and wrote episodes of MacGyver.

Film critic Chris Gore considers Turman's original screenplay for a Silver Surfer film one of the "50 Greatest Movies Never Made", devoting a chapter on the Silver Surfer script in his book of the same name.

While Turman's solo Silver Surfer project was not made, Turman's story and script were incorporated into what became Fantastic Four: Rise of the Silver Surfer.

He is the co-author of The Hulk; The Illustrated Screenplay, and is the sole author of three issues of Hulk: Gamma Games.

In addition to his work as a screenwriter, Turman taught as an adjunct professor at the USC School of Cinematic Arts and is a frequent panelist and lecturer. He received a J.D. degree from UCLA, and worked as illustrator, storyboard artist, and martial arts instructor.

== Filmography ==
- 2016–2017: MacGyver, television series (writer, 2 episodes)
- 2011: Ticking Clock, (writer/co-producer; video)
- 2009: Ben 10: Alien Swarm (writer)
- 2007: Fantastic Four: Rise of the Silver Surfer (writer)
- 2003: Hulk (writer)
- 2000–2001: Freedom, television series (writer, 3 episodes)
- 1998: The Crow: Stairway to Heaven: (writer, 1 episode)

== Bibliography ==
- The Hulk; The Illustrated Screenplay (co-author)
- The Hulk: Gamma Games
