= Brian Banner =

Marvel Comics fictional character

- Brian Banner as seen in The Incredible Hulk #-1.

Publication information
- Publisher: Marvel Comics
- First appearance: The Incredible Hulk (vol. 2) #267 (January 1982) (cameo); The Incredible Hulk (vol. 2) #312 (October 1985) (full appearance)
- Created by: Bill Mantlo (writer); Sal Buscema (artist)

In-story information
- Full name: Dr. Brian David Banner
- Species: Human (originally); Human mutate (briefly revived form)
- Notable aliases: Devil Hulk; Guilt Hulk
- Abilities: Genius-level intellect; Gamma mutate possession

Brian David Banner is a character appearing in American comic books published by Marvel Comics. Created by Bill Mantlo and Sal Buscema, the character first appeared in The Incredible Hulk (vol. 2) #267 (January 1982). He is the abusive father of Bruce Banner. His abuse was a contributing factor to Bruce Banner's eventual transformation into the Hulk.

Nick Nolte portrays a version of the character in the 2003 film Hulk.

== Publication history ==
Brian Banner debuted in The Incredible Hulk (vol. 2) #267 (January 1982), created by Bill Mantlo and Sal Buscema. He appeared in the 2010 Immortal Hulk series, the 2018 Immortal Hulk series, and in the 2020 The Immortal Hulk #0 one-shot. Diamond Comic Distributors reported that The Immortal Hulk #0 was the 40th best-selling comic book in September 2020.

== Fictional character biography ==
As a small child, Brian and his two sisters, Elaine and Susan and their mother were physically and mentally abused by their violent alcoholic father. Brian regarded his father as a monster and believed that he had inherited a "monster gene" from him, and so promised himself that he would never have any children, for fear of bringing another Banner into the world.

As an adult, Brian marries a woman named Rebecca, earns a PhD in physics, and finds a job in Los Alamos, New Mexico, working for the United States government on a project developing a clean way to create nuclear energy. The stress of his job leads Brian to become an alcoholic himself, and he frequently lashes out at those around him. While drunk at work one day, Brian accidentally overloads some machinery, causing an explosion that costs him his job. Despite his vow never to have children, Brian impregnates Rebecca, who gives birth to their only child, Robert Bruce Banner. Brian believes Bruce has inherited both the "monster gene" and genetic defects due to the accident in Los Alamos, so he ignores him completely and attempts to keep Rebecca away from him. He frequently leaves Bruce in the care of the neglectful Nurse Meachum. When Bruce wakes up one Christmas morning and opens a present from his mother, a complex model, he assembles it easily despite his young age. This convinces Brian that his assumptions about Bruce were correct. As a result, he beats Bruce as well as Rebecca after she comes to his aid.

After enduring years of heavy abuse from Brian, Rebecca attempts to escape from him with Bruce. Brian discovers his wife and son packing the car just before their escape and smashes Rebecca's head against the pavement, killing her in front of Bruce. Brian manages to stop Bruce from testifying against him at his trial for Rebecca's murder, saying that if he did so, he would go to Hell. Terrified, Bruce perjures himself, testifying that his father never abused him or Rebecca, and that his mother tried to run away for no reason. Brian escapes conviction due to lack of evidence, but soon afterwards is arrested again when he drunkenly boasts about beating the law by bullying his son. Brian is imprisoned, but he pleads insanity as a last resort, and is later transferred to a mental institution. Bruce is left in the care of his aunt Susan, now known as Mrs. Drake.

After 15 years of confinement, Brian, who is believed fit for reintroduction into society, is released into a reluctant Bruce's care. Living with Bruce causes Brian's delusions to resurface and, on the anniversary of Rebecca's death, Brian and Bruce engage in a verbal and later physical fight at Rebecca's grave. During the fight, Bruce accidentally kills Brian by knocking him headfirst into Rebecca's headstone. Bruce represses the memories of Brian's stay with him and his subsequent death, making himself believe that Brian was killed by muggers.

Brian's ghost continues to haunt Bruce's alter-ego the Hulk after his death, often appearing to taunt him, stating that Bruce was no better than himself; villains such as Mentallo, the Red Skull, Devil Hulk, and Guilt Hulk also use the image of Brian Banner against the Hulk in an attempt to weaken him. One prominent storyline saw the Red Skull use mind-manipulating technology to make the Hulk see the Juggernaut as his father and use the Hulk to attack other heroes, but this plan failed when the Juggernaut praised the Hulk's efforts, something that the true Brian had never done.

When Bruce Banner and the Hulk were fused back together after the events of Heroes Return, Bruce found himself in Hell, where he met several former adversaries, including Brian's spirit. Bruce was terrorized by Brian, Leader, and Maestro. He eventually stood up to his father, attacking and strangling him before being returned to Earth by an image of his wife, Betty Ross. Having faced his father, Bruce's haunting by him ceases.

When Bruce Banner develops ALS, Mister Fantastic collects DNA from Brian Banner's corpse to cure him. Bruce subsequently visits his father's grave and laments his confusion over his feelings for his father, noting the fact that he now owes his life to the man despite his old issues with him.

It is later implied that Bruce killing Brian was not actually an accident. He notes during a confrontation with Daken and Wolverine that he has managed to avoid causing any innocent deaths when he is rampaging as the Hulk—save for those occasions when he is under the control or influence of something else—and suggesting that it is unlikely that he would make such a 'mistake' in his more limited human form. Even more recently, it was revealed that the police knew that Bruce was responsible for Brian's death, but they deliberately overlooked the evidence because they had known Rebecca personally and had even known Bruce's uncle, Sheriff Morris Walters.

Brian returns as a Guilt Hulk/Devil Hulk hybrid.

During the "Chaos War" storyline, Brian Banner is temporarily resurrected after Death flees her realm and transforms into a Guilt Hulk/Devil Hulk hybrid. As Rebecca was also revived, Brian tried to kill Rebecca again only for Hulk to protect her. Brian started feeding off his son's fears and got stronger. Hulk overcomes his fear of Brian and defeats him after being encouraged by Jarella.

Brian Banner returns to the living as a ghost who possesses Sasquatch and puts him on a rampage. This rampage attracts Hulk. After figuring out that Brian is behind the possession and learning the reason why Riot Squad member Jailbait lost control of her powers, Hulk drains the gamma energy out of Sasquatch, regressing him to his human form. It was revealed that Brian's ghost was being instructed by a being called the One Below All.

The Leader later assimilates Brian's body and mind and removes his skeleton from his body for research.

== Powers and abilities ==
Brian Banner has genius-level intellect. When Banner was resurrected during the Chaos War storyline, he gained the ability to turn into a hybrid replica of the Guilt Hulk and the Devil Hulk. While in this state, Brian possessed power and strength relative to how powerful Bruce perceived him as being. As a ghost, Brian can possess gamma-powered beings.

== Other versions ==
=== Devil's Reign ===
An alternate universe version of Brian Banner from Earth-8816 appears in Devil's Reign: Superior Four #1.

=== House of M ===
An alternate universe version of Brian Banner from Earth-58163 appears in House of M.

== In other media ==
- A predated version of Brian Banner appears in The Incredible Hulk episode "Homecoming", portrayed by John Marley. This version is a farmer named D.W. Banner who is also the father of Helen Banner (portrayed by Diana Muldaur).
- Brian Banner, renamed David Banner, appears in Hulk, portrayed primarily by Nick Nolte and by Paul Kersey as a young adult. This version is a geneticist who experimented on and mutated his DNA, which his son Bruce inherited. While attempting to find a cure for Bruce's condition thirty years prior to the film, General Thunderbolt Ross halted David's research. Angered by this, the latter destroys his laboratory to prevent the military from using his data and tries to murder Bruce, believing he will mutate out of control. However, David accidentally kills his wife Edith when she tries to stop him before he is arrested and remanded to a mental institution by Ross while Bruce is taken into foster care. In the present, David is released and learns of Bruce's transformation into the Hulk. Seeing Hulk as his "true son", David attempts to replicate his powers, giving himself the ability to absorb matter similar to Absorbing Man and Zzzax. He eventually fights Hulk in combat only to be killed in an explosion.
- In a deleted scene in Thor: Ragnarok, Brian is indirectly mentioned by Bruce Banner.
