= Thunderbolt Ross =

Comic book character

- Thunderbolt Ross as he appeared on a splash page of The Incredible Hulk #291 (January 1984); Art by Sal Buscema

Publication information
- Publisher: Marvel Comics
- First appearance: The Incredible Hulk #1 (May 1962); As Red Hulk: Hulk #1 (January 2008)
- Created by: Thunderbolt Ross: Stan Lee (writer); Jack Kirby (artist); Red Hulk: Jeph Loeb (writer); Ed McGuinness (artist)

In-story information
- Full name: Thaddeus E. "Thunderbolt" Ross
- Species: Human mutate
- Team affiliations: Hulkbusters; United States Army Air Corp; United States Air Force; Federal Government of the United States; Offenders; Avengers; Thunderbolts; Power Elite; Control
- Notable aliases: General Ross, Red Hulk, Rulk, The Thing (Future Imperfect)
- Abilities: As Thunderbolt Ross: Expert military leader, strategist, and tactician; Access to many soldiers, armies, conventional, and unconventional weapons; As Red Hulk: Immeasurable strength, stamina, durability, and speed; Healing factor; Energy absorption; Limited thermokinesis

General Thaddeus E. "Thunderbolt" Ross is a fictional character who appears in comic books published by Marvel Comics featuring the Hulk. Ross is a United States military officer, the father of Betty Ross, and the ex-father-in-law of both Glenn Talbot and Bruce Banner.

A jingoistic war hawk, Ross is portrayed as the military head of the gamma bomb project that turned Banner into the Hulk. After the creation of the Hulk, Ross pursues the creature with a growing obsession, and, after learning that Banner and the Hulk are one and the same, Ross hunts Banner as well. His motivations vary between different iterations, from a petulant hatred of Banner himself, to a Captain Ahab-esque desire to defeat the Hulk in combat, and sometimes even more villainous motivations such as hoping to harness the Hulk's abilities and create similar bioweapons for use by the US government. Ross was transformed into the first Red Hulk to better combat the Hulk, though this instead led him to become more sympathetic towards Banner and eventually become a superhero, serving as a member of the Avengers and forming his own Thunderbolts team.

Ross has appeared in numerous media adaptations, including animated television series, video games, and live-action feature films. He has been voiced by numerous actors in animation, including John Vernon, Keith Ferguson, Fred Tatasciore, and Clancy Brown. In live-action, Sam Elliott portrayed the character in the film Hulk (2003). In the Marvel Cinematic Universe (MCU), the character is portrayed by William Hurt (2008–2021) and Harrison Ford (2025).

== Publication history ==
Thunderbolt Ross first appeared in The Incredible Hulk #1 (May 1962) and was created by Stan Lee and Jack Kirby as a nemesis for the Hulk. He was a recurring character throughout this series. His character origin was revealed in The Incredible Hulk #291. The Red Hulk first appeared in Hulk vol. 3 #1 (January 2008), created by Jeph Loeb and Ed McGuiness, but his identity as Ross was not revealed until later. The origin of Red Hulk was revealed in Hulk #23.

Red Hulk began appearing as a regular character in Avengers vol. 4, from issue #7 (January 2011) through its final issue #34 (January 2013). His popularity resulted in him becoming a main character in the 2012 Thunderbolts series by Daniel Way and Steve Dillon. He also appeared in the issues #1–3 of the 2011 series The Avenging Spider-Man (November 2008) by Zeb Wells and Joe Madureira as a team-up character for Spider-Man.

== Fictional character biography ==
Born to a prominent military family, with both his father and grandfather having served, Thaddeus Ross was primed to follow in their footsteps. He joined the Air Force straight out of high school and climbed the ranks quickly while raising a family.

Holding the rank of lieutenant general, Ross is chosen to oversee Bruce Banner's gamma bomb project. His daughter, Betty, takes a liking to the young scientist, deepening Ross' dislike for the "weakling". After Banner's transformation into the Hulk, Ross spends years chasing the monster, becoming obsessed enough to commit treason by allying himself with supervillains such as the Leader, MODOK and the Abomination to destroy the Hulk. Dismissed from the military, he shows up at Betty and Bruce's wedding with a gun and shoots Rick Jones. He is recruited by S.H.I.E.L.D. agent Clay Quartermain to merge with the electric creature Zzzax, a process that gives Ross superpowers but also makes him mentally unstable. He is later restored to human form, but retains some residual energy-generating powers.

Finally, the Nevermind, a mutant who drains people of their life energy, attacks Gamma Base in search of a strong host, in this case the Hulk. After witnessing Banner and Jones (who was the Hulk at that time) heroically engaging the mutant, Ross realizes that he has been wrong about the Hulk being a mindless monster. He saves his daughter by allowing the mutant to latch on him and discharging the energy resources he retained from Zzzax. Giving his blessing to Banner and Betty, he dies in his daughter's arms.

Ross' body is stolen by the Leader, who uses the powers of one of his followers to resurrect him as a replacement for his fallen soldier Redeemer. Ross is eventually recovered and revived by agents of the alien Troyjan and returns to the Air Force. He later comes up with a more cost-effective method of confronting the Hulk: ignoring him.

Ross would become friends with Banner, but when Betty is seemingly killed due to what both Ross and Banner believed to have been Banner's gamma-irradiated DNA interacting with Betty's, he once more pursues the Hulk with a vendetta.

Around this time, General John Ryker takes over the pursuit of the Hulk. Ross is indirectly involved, observing when Ryker mentally tortures Banner to try to figure out how the Hulk works. The Hulk escapes from Ryker's control and, after several adventures, is lost in space.

After the Hulk returns from exile and initiates "World War Hulk", General Ross, now a full general, makes his own return, electing to bring the fight to his nemesis once more after the Hulk beats Iron Man. After a failed assault on the Hulk, Ross and his men are captured and placed in chains under the watch of the Warbound, the army he has brought back from space. The Hulk is eventually defeated via satellite weapons that revert him back to his human form.

=== Red Hulk ===
The Red Hulk as seen on the cover of Hulk (vol. 2) #1 (January 2008), art by Ed McGuinness.

The Red Hulk (also known as the Rulk or the IncREDible Hulk) was introduced in 2008 in Hulk (vol. 2) #1. The Red Hulk was created to be an uninhibited, tactically intelligent adversary to the Hulk. Although Kenneth Johnson, the creator of the 1970s TV series The Incredible Hulk, had suggested a red Hulk for that adaptation decades earlier, Marvel editor-in-chief Joe Quesada proposed the idea for the comics to debut a red version of the character whose human identity was a secret. Initially, the Red Hulk's identity was unknown both to the characters in the story and the reading audience.

The opening story arc of the Hulk (vol. 2) series that premiered in 2008 established that the Red Hulk is very aggressive, as he murders the Wendigo and Abomination; destroys the S.H.I.E.L.D. Helicarrier; defeats several Marvel heroes; and, after causing an earthquake in San Francisco, is defeated by the Hulk and Thor. In a subsequent storyline, the Collector places the character with other villains on a team called the Offenders, an evil version of the Defenders, in a bid to prevent the Hulk from reuniting with Jarella. In that story, the Red Hulk siphons the Power Cosmic from the Silver Surfer, seemingly killing him, steals his board and Terrax's cosmic axe, and kills Namor, Tiger Shark, Doctor Strange, Baron Mordo, the Grandmaster, Terrax, Hulk, and Psycho-Man. When the Red Hulk reveals this to Galactus, Galactus takes back the Power Cosmic from him. Subsequently, almost everyone he killed is resurrected with no memory of the event.

The Red Hulk was created as part of a super soldier program by several persons, including Doc Samson and the criminal think tank the Intelligencia, headed by MODOK. The 2009 "Code Red" story arc also made allusions to the Red Hulk's real identity, and introduced Red She-Hulk.

In the 2010 story line "Fall of the Hulks: Gamma", the Red Hulk is related in flashback to have killed General Ross at the behest of Bruce Banner, with whom he has formed an alliance. However, the 2010 "World War Hulks" story line reveals that the Red Hulk is Thunderbolt Ross, the Red She-Hulk is Betty Ross, and the Ross who was killed was a Life Model Decoy (LMD). The Red Hulk then thwarts the Intelligencia's plan to take over the United States with an LMD of Glenn Talbot by destroying the Talbot LMD and attempts to take over the country himself. He is thwarted by a restored Hulk, who beats the Red Hulk mostly due to the Red Hulk's exhaustion from overheating. The Hulk tells the Red Hulk that it was his idea to fake Ross' death and that he can never again resume that identity. After imprisoning the Red Hulk in Gamma Base, Banner makes arrangements with Steve Rogers for the Red Hulk to join the Avengers.

After Rogers recruits the Red Hulk, the Red Hulk stops the Intelligencia's failsafe plan "Scorched Earth". Although Banner had claimed that he removed the Red Hulk's energy-draining ability from him because it was killing him, he is shown to still possess this ability. After the events of the Scorched Earth program, the Red Hulk is paired up with an LMD named Annie.

As part of the 2012 Marvel NOW! relaunch, the Red Hulk leads a non-government sponsored version of the Thunderbolts. This incarnation is a strike team that cleans up the messes left by Ross' military career, but the team later decides on a new arrangement in which the team will do one mission for Ross, then a mission for a random member.

Ross is later depowered by Doc Green, a new personality of Bruce Banner who believes that gamma-powered superhumans are a threat to humanity. He is imprisoned, but is later paroled for helping a resistance cell during "Secret Empire". After being tortured by Cutthroat, who is acting on orders of Alexa Lukin and Crossbones, Ross suddenly regains his ability to transform into Red Hulk.

During the One World Under Doom storyline, Ross is kidnapped by Doctor Doom, who forces him to join his think tank. He is able to escape from the Doombots alongside Deathlok and Machine Man. After making their way to the border of Latveria, all three of them are arrested by the U.S. Army for violating the treaty with Doom. However, Wildstreak helps the three escape.

== Powers and abilities ==
Marvel editor Mark Paniccia described the Red Hulk as "absolutely uninhibited, tactically intelligent", while writer Jeph Loeb said "The Red Hulk is the kind of Hulk we haven't seen before—a thinking, calculating, brutal weapon-toting kind of Hulk." To further distance the character away from the original: "Everything the Green Hulk isn't, the Red Hulk is. Except, of course, for his powers which are identical. And he looks the same, except he's red. And he's the same size. But other than that, they're complete opposites." The character has abilities almost identical to those of the Hulk. He can also emit heat at will from his eyes during non-enraged periods and can augment power levels by absorbing various types of energy, such as gamma radiation and the Power Cosmic. When infected with Cable's techno-organic virus during the "X-Sanction" storyline, he was able to control this heat to burn the virus out of his system. Red Hulk was created through a combination of gamma radiation and cosmic rays. The satellites used to revert the Hulk to human form at the end of World War Hulk were used to power the device used to turn Ross into the Red Hulk. Unlike the green Hulk, the Red Hulk does not revert to human form when rendered unconscious, and his blood is a fluorescent yellow instead of green, remaining that color even in human form. Unlike the green Hulk, who gets stronger as his rage increases, Red Hulk's body temperature rises with his anger. Though the heat is intense enough to melt desert sand into glass, it causes him to weaken when it becomes too intense, as he lacks a cooling mechanism to deal with the excess heat. Red Hulk has also been shown to have a weakness to Negative Zone energy, which caused him burning pain and drained him when he attempted to absorb it.

== Reception ==
In 2009, Thunderbolt Ross was ranked as IGN's 71st Greatest Comic Book Villain of All Time.

=== Red Hulk reception ===
Comics featuring the Red Hulk sold well but received mixed reviews. The first five issues of the 2008 Hulk title sold out, and second printings featured new covers. Issue #6 was the second-best-selling title of September 2008, and issue #10 was sixth in February 2009.

Augie De Blieck Jr. of Comic Book Resources gave the first six issues a positive review, describing it as a "silly fun action romp" and a "popcorn comic". De Blieck liked Loeb's lack of subtlety when giving out clues, saying "this is a book where anytime someone is about reveal the solution to the big mystery, they get knocked out by a slap in the face from the Red Hulk or a machine gun to the gut." His one criticism was that, although he liked the artwork, he would have preferred Dale Keown as the artist.

In 2012 Red Hulk was listed as #41 on IGN's "Top 50 Avengers". IGN reviewer Jesse Schedeen was generally critical of the series, citing a lack of character development and the emphasis on action over the ongoing question of Red Hulk's identity. Schedeen also derided the treatment of other mainstream Marvel characters within the pages of Hulk, saying about issue #5 "The series has already treated She-Hulk and Iron Man like ragdolls who crumple under the awesome might of Red Hulk. Now it's Thor's turn". Schedeen disliked the series for its poor dialogue, pacing, and characterization, and stated that Ed McGuinness' artwork was its only saving grace.

== Other versions ==
- An alternate universe version of Thunderbolt Ross from Earth-295 appears in "Age of Apocalypse". This version is a member of the Human High Council, a movement dedicated to protecting humans from Apocalypse.
- An alternate universe version of Thunderbolt Ross from Earth-9602, amalgamated with Uncle Ben, appears in the Amalgam Comics one-shot Spider-Boy. This version is a leading member of Project Cadmus who took in Spider-Boy after his creation, feeling personally responsible for the accident that killed Cadmus member Peter Parker. Ross was later killed by a burglar.
- An alternate universe version of Thunderbolt Ross appears in X-Men: Days of Future Past - Doomsday #2. This version resigned in protest over the government's increased anti-mutant legislation, which he saw as a violation of individual rights due to American citizens.
- An alternate universe version of Thunderbolt Ross from a pocket dimension created by Franklin Richards appears in "Heroes Reborn". This version is the Chief of Staff for the United States military.
- An alternate universe version of Thunderbolt Ross from Earth-311 appears in 1602: New World. This version is an Admiral in the Royal Navy.
- An alternate universe version of Thunderbolt Ross from Earth-2301 appears in Marvel Mangaverse #1. This version is the commander of a space station before he is killed by Galactus.
- An alternate universe version of Thunderbolt Ross from Earth-99062 appears in Mini Marvels.
- An alternate universe version of Thunderbolt Ross from Earth-555 appears in Newuniversal. This version is the Chief of Staff.
- An alternate universe version of Thunderbolt Ross from Earth-1610 appears in the Ultimate Marvel universe. This version is the head of S.H.I.E.L.D. and an ally of the Fantastic Four.

== In other media ==
=== Television ===
- Thunderbolt Ross appears in The Marvel Super Heroes, voiced by Claude Rae.
- Thunderbolt Ross appears in The Incredible Hulk (1982), voiced by Robert Ridgely.
- Thunderbolt Ross appears in The Incredible Hulk (1996), voiced by John Vernon.
- Thunderbolt Ross makes a non-speaking appearance in the Fantastic Four: World's Greatest Heroes episode "Hard Knocks".
- Thunderbolt Ross / Red Hulk appears in The Avengers: Earth's Mightiest Heroes, respectively voiced by Keith Ferguson and Fred Tatasciore. This version is the leader of the Hulkbusters and a secret member of Red Skull's "Code Red".
- Thunderbolt Ross appears in Iron Man: Armored Adventures, voiced by Eric Bauza.
- Thunderbolt Ross / Red Hulk appears in Hulk and the Agents of S.M.A.S.H., voiced by Clancy Brown.
- Thunderbolt Ross / Red Hulk appears in Ultimate Spider-Man, voiced again by Clancy Brown.
  - Additionally, a Marvel Noir-inspired incarnation of Ross appears in the episode "Return to the Spider-Verse" as a member of Joe Fixit's gang.
- Thunderbolt Ross / Red Hulk appears in Avengers Assemble, voiced again by Clancy Brown. This version is a member of the Mighty Avengers.
- Thunderbolt Ross appears in the X-Men '97 episode "Bright Eyes", voiced by Michael Patrick McGill.

=== Film ===
Thunderbolt Ross appears in Hulk (2003), portrayed by Sam Elliott. This version is a four-star administrator of Desert Base, later known as Gamma Base, in the 1970s and was a colleague of David Banner. After the murder of Edith Banner, Ross continues to supervise Bruce Banner and Betty Ross at the Berkeley Lab.

=== Marvel Cinematic Universe ===
Thaddeus Ross has appeared in various media set in the Marvel Cinematic Universe (MCU), initially portrayed by William Hurt and subsequently by Harrison Ford. Hurt portrayed the character in The Incredible Hulk (2008), Captain America: Civil War (2016), Avengers: Infinity War (2018), Avengers: Endgame (2019), and Black Widow (2021). Ford portrayed the character in Captain America: Brave New World (2025) where he also turned into the Red Hulk. Alternate versions of Ross in the Multiverse appear in What If...? (2021) voiced by Michael Patrick McGill, and Your Friendly Neighborhood Spider-Man (2025) voiced by Travis Willingham.

=== Video games ===
- Thunderbolt Ross makes a minor appearance in the Hulk (2003) tie-in game.
- Thunderbolt Ross appears in The Incredible Hulk: Ultimate Destruction, voiced by Dave Thomas.
- Red Hulk appears as an alternate costume for the Hulk in Marvel: Ultimate Alliance 2, Marvel Super Hero Squad, Marvel vs. Capcom 3: Fate of Two Worlds, Ultimate Marvel vs. Capcom 3, Marvel Super Hero Squad: The Infinity Gauntlet, and Marvel vs. Capcom: Infinite.
- Red Hulk appears as a playable character in Marvel Super Hero Squad Online.
- Red Hulk appears as an unlockable character in Marvel Avengers Alliance.
- Thunderbolt Ross appears as a playable character in Lego Marvel Super Heroes, voiced by John DiMaggio.
- Red Hulk appears as a playable character in Marvel Contest of Champions.
- Red Hulk appears as a playable character in Marvel: Future Fight.
- Thunderbolt Ross / Red Hulk appears as a playable character in Lego Marvel's Avengers.
- Red Hulk appears as a playable character in Marvel Avengers Academy.
- Red Hulk appears as a playable character in Marvel Puzzle Quest.
- Thunderbolt Ross / Red Hulk appears as a playable character in Lego Marvel Super Heroes 2.

== Merchandise ==
Red Hulk has been merchandised in the form of action figures and miniature statues.

== Collected editions ==
Title	Material collected	Publication date	ISBN
Hulk Vol. 1: Red Hulk	Hulk (vol. 2) #1–6	February 2009	0-7851-2882-4
Hulk Vol. 2: Red & Green	Hulk (vol. 2) #7–9; King-Size Hulk #1	July 2009	0-7851-2884-0
Hulk Vol. 3: Hulk No More	Hulk (vol. 2) #10–13; Incredible Hulk #600	February 2010	0-7851-4052-2
Hulk: Fall of the Hulks Prelude	Hulk (vol. 2) #2, 16; Skaar: Son of Hulk #1; Hulk: Raging Thunder; Planet Skaar Prologue; All-New Savage She-Hulk #4;	February 2010	0-7851-4315-7
Hulk Vol. 4: Hulk vs. X-Force	Hulk (vol. 2) #14–18	June 2010	0-7851-4053-0
Hulk: Fall of the Hulks – Red Hulk	Fall of the Hulks: Red Hulk #1–4	August 2010	0-7851-4795-0
Hulk Vol. 5: Fall of the Hulks	Hulk (vol. 2) #19–21; Fall of the Hulks: Gamma	November 2010	0-7851-4054-9
Hulk Vol. 6: World War Hulks	Hulk (vol. 2) #22–24	March 2011	0-7851-4267-3
Red Hulk: Scorched Earth	Hulk (vol. 2) #25–30	May 2011	0-7851-4896-5
Planet Red Hulk	Hulk (vol. 2) #30.1, 31–36	October 2011	0-7851-5578-3
Fear Itself: Hulk	Hulk (vol. 2) #37–41	February 2012	0-7851-5579-1
Hulk: Hulk of Arabia	Hulk (vol. 2) #42–46	April 2012	0-7851-6095-7
Hulk: Haunted Hulk	Hulk (vol. 2) #47–52	August 2012	978-0-7851-6099-1
Red Hulk: Mayan Rule	Hulk (vol. 2) #53–57	November 2012	0-7851-6097-3
