= Hulk (video game) =

2003 video game

- North American Windows cover art
- Developer: Radical Entertainment
- Publisher: Universal Interactive
- Director: Mark James
- Producers: Tim Bennison; Jeff Barnhart
- Designers: Mike Skupa; Eric Holmes; Katrina Archer (PC)
- Programmer: Chris Cudahy
- Artist: Martin Bae
- Writer: Jeff Houde
- Composer: Graig Robertson
- Platforms: PlayStation 2; Xbox; GameCube; Microsoft Windows
- Release: NA: May 28, 2003; EU: June 13, 2003; AU: June 26, 2003
- Genres: Beat 'em up, stealth
- Mode: Single-player

Hulk is a 2003 action video game developed by Radical Entertainment and published by Universal Interactive for the PlayStation 2, Xbox, GameCube, and Microsoft Windows. The game primarily features beat 'em up gameplay showcasing the Marvel Comics superhero Hulk, and also includes stealth-based levels featuring the Hulk's human alter-ego Bruce Banner. While the game is a tie-in to the film of the same name (featuring the voice of Eric Bana reprising his role as Banner from the film), its narrative serves as a sequel, taking place years after the events of the film. The plot follows the Hulk and Banner, who must battle their arch-nemesis the Leader and stop him from unleashing an army of mutants upon the world.

Hulk received mixed reviews from critics; while reviewers praised the initial satisfaction of using the Hulk's powers, intuitive controls, cel shaded visuals, interactive environments, sound design, and voice acting (particularly Bana's), they had mixed assessments of the range of fighting moves, music, and storyline, and criticized the repetitive gameplay, lack of enemy variety, simplistic stealth levels, and static camera. The game was commercially successful, selling over two million copies across all platforms. One of the Xbox version's levels was included as a playable demo on the film's DVD release, marking the first integration of a game demo onto a DVD. A sequel was in development, but was reworked into the standalone game The Incredible Hulk: Ultimate Destruction, which was released in 2005.

== Gameplay ==
The gameplay in Hulk is divided between beat 'em up levels featuring the Hulk (top) and stealth-based levels featuring Bruce Banner (bottom)

Hulk is a third-person action game in which the player alternatively controls the Hulk and his human alter-ego Bruce Banner; the majority of the game's levels are beat 'em up stages featuring the Hulk, while Banner's levels are based primarily on stealth. The game's narrative follows Banner and the Hulk as they pursue Banner's mentor Professor Crawford, who has betrayed him to assist the Hulk's arch-nemesis the Leader in a plot to unleash an army of gamma-powered mutants upon the world. Both characters have a health meter displayed on the top-left corner of the screen, which is decreased by enemy attacks; the meter's depletion results in the Hulk's defeat or Banner transforming into the Hulk, thus failing the current objective. Health can be restored by collecting green orbs, while collecting blue orbs allows the player to resume progress from a checkpoint rather than the beginning of the level if health is depleted.

In the Hulk's stages, the Hulk must combat numerous enemies as well as engage in environmental destruction to progress. He is capable of an array of punches, grapples, and throws, as well as special moves such as claps, stomps, and deflecting incoming missiles. A red "rage" meter is displayed below his health meter, and can be filled by collecting red orbs. The Hulk enters a "Rage Mode" when the rage meter is full, during which his attacks become more powerful and destructive. At the cost of the full rage meter, he can also execute two wide-range attacks. Numerous objects can be picked up by the Hulk and wielded as a weapon, while particularly large objects such as crates, cars, and tanks can be thrown to clear out groups of enemies from a distance.

Banner's stages revolve around sneaking through guarded facilities while evading cameras, searchlights, soldiers, and other forms of surveillance. He can crouch, dive, and clamber across ledges, as well as push and pull objects to reveal secret passages. Some doors are attached to a security terminal, requiring Banner to engage in a hacking minigame to open the door and proceed. While Banner has a limited amount of combat techniques for engaging enemies, he can also fake surrender by freezing in place if he is detected by a guard, and can catch the guard by surprise after allowing him to approach.

Apart from the story mode, the game features five Challenge Modes, in which the Hulk must fulfill objectives such as surviving as long as possible against endless waves of enemies, defeating as many enemies as possible within an allotted time, or destroying as much as the environment as possible before the time runs out.

== Plot ==
Bruce Banner is a genetic scientist who specializes in studying the effects of gamma radiation on damaged tissue. After continually struggling with fits of anxiety, embarrassment, and rage, a freak lab accident results in Banner transforming into a powerful beast known as the Hulk whenever he is agitated. Years later in San Francisco, Banner receives an offer of a cure from his old mentor Professor Geoffrey Crawford, who is suffering from a neurodegenerative disease that has left him unable to walk. Crawford has invented a device for siphoning and storing gamma energy named the Gamma Orb, and he guides Banner via earpiece to his laboratory in the midst of a military raid led by John Ryker, who desires the Orb. However, Crawford betrays Banner by capturing a fraction of the Hulk's power and using it to mutate himself into the Hulk-like creature Ravage, alleviating his frailness. Banner transforms into the Hulk and pursues Ravage through the city while fighting off Ryker's forces, but loses him in the sewer system. The Hulk is ambushed by the energy vampire Half-Life, who reveals that Ravage has taken the Orb to Alcatraz. Upon his defeat to the Hulk, Half-Life boasts that if the Hulk is detected in Alcatraz, a hostage will be killed.

Banner infiltrates Alcatraz, where the Leader is building an army of gamma-powered soldiers using Ravage's Orb. Banner deactivates the facility's gamma detection system, allowing him to transform without endangering the hostage, who he discovers is Betty Ross. The Hulk fights through Alcatraz and defeats the Leader's brother Madman, who had placed Ross in an irradiation chamber for her lack of cooperation in the Leader's plan. Following Ross's instruction, the Hulk takes her to the military's subterranean Gamma Base to treat her radiation exposure, but is incapacitated by a force field. Banner is injected with gamma-suppressing sedatives and strapped to an operating table, where Ryker plans on dissecting him. Ross frees Banner, who formulates an antidote while disguised as a soldier. The Hulk fights the military while trying to find and destroy the force field generator. He confronts and defeats a gamma-powered soldier named Flux, throwing him into the generator to destroy it.

The Hulk escapes and returns to Alcatraz. Navigating through the underground complex, the Hulk finally confronts Ravage, who guards a teleportation device used to transport the Leader's forces from his lair, "New Freehold". Ravage is defeated and returns to the form of Crawford, who expresses remorse for his desperation and treachery assisting the Leader's machinations. He informs Banner that the Gamma Orb is in the Leader's possession at New Freehold, and allows Banner to teleport there. Banner is ambushed by Half-Life and Madman, provoking the Hulk into fighting them. Madman abandons Half-Life in the middle of the fight, leaving him to his defeat. The Hulk confronts the Leader, who hands him the Gamma Orb and cures Banner of his condition. Banner, disallowing the Leader from abusing the Gamma Orb's power, reclaims its energy and becomes the Hulk once more. The Hulk defeats the Leader and destroys the Gamma Orb, bringing about New Freehold's collapse. The Leader escapes and leaves the Hulk to make his way to the teleportation device, only managing to escape after Madman delays him in a last-ditch effort to bury him under the collapsing lair. Crawford unsuccessfully tries to recreate the Gamma Orb, Ryker experiments on Flux, and Banner hitchhikes along a desert road.

== Development and release ==
Universal Interactive signed a deal with Marvel Enterprises for the video game rights of the Marvel Comics character Hulk in January 2002. Radical Entertainment obtained the contract to develop a Hulk-based game by presenting a playable prototype within 2–3 weeks. On June 10, Universal Interactive revealed the development of a video game based on the upcoming Hulk film, with a release coinciding with that of the film in June 2003. While the Hulk's appearance would be modeled after the film version, the game would feature its own narrative, in a manner similar to Universal Interactive's previous adaptation of The Scorpion King.

Mark James served as the game's director, while Radical's Tim Bennison and Universal's Jeff Barnhart served as producers. Bennison noted that adapting the Hulk into a video game was challenging due both to expectations from fans of the character's several iterations and the need to balance the gameplay with the Hulk's immense power. The development team received an advance look at the film's script, visited the film's set multiple times, and were granted access to Industrial Light & Magic's digital models and concept art of the special effects. The original game design was created by Mike Skupa and finalized by Eric Holmes using Touchdown Entertainment's Copperhead Technology engine. Chris Cuhady, Martin Bae, and Bryan Gillingham respectively served as lead programmer, art director, and lead animator. The script was written by Jeff Houde, and the voice-acting was directed by Michael Donovan, Terry Klassen, and Phillip Webster. Eric Bana reprises his role as Bruce Banner from the film, while the Leader is voiced by Michael Dobson. Graig Robertson directed the game's audio, composed and edited the music, and provided the Hulk's vocalizations. A cheat code that turns the Hulk into the Grey Hulk if it is entered into a door's security terminal is hidden within the film during the scene preceding Banner's first transformation into the Hulk. At peak production time, as many as 65 people at Radical worked on the game.

An official gameplay trailer produced by Absinthe Pictures was released on April 11, 2003. After 18 months in development, Hulk was shipped on May 27, and was released in North America the following day. The game was released in Europe on June 13, a few weeks before the film's United Kingdom premiere on July 18, and in Australia on June 26. In its debut month, the PlayStation 2 version was the fourth best-selling console game in North America and the second-highest rental in Blockbuster Video, as well as the fourth-highest rental in the following month. Across all platforms, the game sold 400,000 copies in its first month, and during its first five weeks, it was the second-highest selling and renting title behind Enter the Matrix. By April 2004, it sold over two million copies across all platforms. A playable demo of the Xbox version, consisting of a single level, was included in the film's DVD release on October 28, marking the first integration of a game demo onto a DVD. The Xbox version is backward compatible with the Xbox 360.

== Reception ==
Reception

Aggregate score
| Aggregator | Score | | | |
| Aggregator | GameCube | PC | PS2 | Xbox |
|---|---|---|---|---|
| Metacritic | 71/100 | 74/100 | 71/100 | 69/100 |

Review scores
| Publication | Score | | | |
| Publication | GameCube | PC | PS2 | Xbox |
|---|---|---|---|---|
| AllGame | N/A | N/A | 3/5 | N/A |
| Electronic Gaming Monthly | 20.5/30 | N/A | 20.5/30 | 20.5/30 |
| Eurogamer | N/A | N/A | 4/10 | N/A |
| Famitsu | N/A | N/A | 26/40 | N/A |
| Game Informer | 5.75/10 | N/A | 5.5/10 | 5.75/10 |
| GamePro | 3.5/5 | N/A | 2.5/5 | 2.5/5 |
| GameRevolution | C | N/A | C | C |
| GameSpot | 6.9/10 | 7/10 | 7.1/10 | 7.1/10 |
| GameSpy | 69% | 69% | 69% | 69% |
| GameZone | 6.5/10 | 8/10 | 8.2/10 | 8.5/10 |
| IGN | 8/10 | 8/10 | 8/10 | 8/10 |
| Jeuxvideo.com | 16/20 | 14.6/20 | 12.2/20 | 15/20 |
| Official U.S. PlayStation Magazine | N/A | N/A | 4/5 | N/A |
| PC Gamer (US) | N/A | 78% | N/A | N/A |

Hulk received "mixed or average" reviews according to aggregator Metacritic. Jeremy Dunham of IGN declared the game to be Radical Entertainment's best yet. He and Scott Alan Marriott of AllGame considered it to be the best Hulk-based game, though Marriott felt the distinction was practically by default considering the weak competition. Reviewers largely enjoyed the initial visceral satisfaction of wielding the Hulk's power, but determined that the gameplay soon became repetitive. The lack of enemy variety and limited range of tactics required to defeat them were both attributed to the feeling of repetition. Ryan Davis of GameSpot, Tim Surette of GameZone, and Dunham only recommended renting the game as it did not take long for them to complete. The controls were appreciated as intuitive, though Chris Baker of Official U.S. PlayStation Magazine noted that hitting two buttons simultaneously for a special attack often leads to undesired results. Assessments of the amount of fighting moves were mixed, with some satisfied with the variety, and others finding it lacking. Ben Silverman of GameRevolution and Marriott were disappointed by the linear level design. Shawn Elliott of Electronic Gaming Monthly negatively compared the "infuriatingly cheap" boss battles to those in X2: Wolverine's Revenge, whereas Baker enjoyed them, particularly Half-Life. While Simon Limon of GamePro faulted the lack of a multiplayer battle mode, Nick Valentino of GameZone welcomed the Challenge mode as a fun means of increasing replay value.

The stealth levels, while acknowledged as an effort to provide gameplay variety and reduce monotony, were considered dull, tedious, and under-developed due to their simplicity compared to similar games such as Metal Gear and Tom Clancy's Splinter Cell. Kristan Reed of Eurogamer, however, found enjoyment in the hacking minigames. Critics also faulted inconsistencies in the enemy artificial intelligence and collision detection. Justin Leeper of Game Informer denounced the stealth levels as "some of the crappiest coding on a next-gen title", remarking that "When the Chicken Run video game has better stealth, you know you're in for a one-way trip to Headachesville, USA; population: you". Marriott suggested that both Banner and the Hulk should have been integrated into more expansive environments, and provided a concept in which levels could be completed with either character, with some routes or areas only accessible to a particular identity. The static camera in both the Hulk and Banner levels was criticized for its tendency to obscure enemy characters.

The cel shaded graphics and art style were widely praised for capturing the feel of comic books in a unique fashion. Silverman and Dunham compared the visuals to watercolor paintings, and Michael Knutson of GameZone remarked that the effect was "psychedelic". While Allen "Delsyn" Rausch of GameSpy regarded the graphics as falling short of exceptional, he still considered the stylistic choice to be a worthwhile effort. The style was not without its detractors; the D-Pad Destroyer of GamePro compared the overall aesthetic to claymation and found it distracting, and Surette felt that while the cel shading technique worked well for the Hulk and the mutant villains, it failed when applied to human characters such as Banner or Ryker. Valentino was impressed by the character design (singling out Banner's resemblance to Bana), and Andrew Reiner of Game Informer felt that the game's Hulk model was almost better than that of the film. However, Benjamin Turner of GameSpy and Silverman derisively described the Hulk as "a green-hued Down's sufferer" and "a beefed-up version of Jim Carrey in Dumb & Dumber" respectively. The environments were admired for their interactive textures and effects, which complimented the Hulk's destructive powers, though Simon Limon and Davis observed that the level designs become repetitive over the course of the game. The consistently fast frame rate was also commended, as were the cutscenes and their seamless transitions to the gameplay. Davis, comparing the three console versions, determined the Xbox version to have the best graphics, observed that the PlayStation 2 version "has a bit more aliasing and some occasionally blurry textures", and found that the GameCube version carried the same deficiencies but to a greater extent. He added that while the PC version's graphics were satisfactory on both high and mid-level machines, he noticed that the pronounced shading effect on the characters was missing when the game ran on mid-level PCs, which he felt somewhat detracted from the visual style.

Reactions to the music were mixed. While some determined it to be fitting and atmospheric, others found it to be average and unremarkable. Silverman and Steven Hopper of GameZone added that the music was muffled and repetitive, and Lisa Mason of Game Informer, comparing the game to other contemporary tie-in titles, remarked that it lacked the "pulsing soundtrack" of Enter the Matrix. Critics generally commended the sound design, particularly in the context of the Hulk's destruction of the environment, though others considered it to be merely adequate. While the D-Pad Destroyer and Valentino admired the Hulk's vocalizations, Davis was underwhelmed by his roars, and Rausch criticized the absence of his "Hulk smash!" catchphrase. The voice-acting was received positively, with Bana's performance being singled out for praise; Baker regarded Bana's voice work as the sole redeeming quality of the stealth levels, and Turner described his delivery as "amusingly earnest", remarking that "Lines like 'I'm bleeding... I need a doctor!' and the oft-repeated 'I've got to move the pairs of symbols until I get a matching series' become pure magic when uttered by such a talented thespian". The enemy voice lines, however, were considered repetitive. Knutson and Valentino commended the use of the Dolby Digital feature. Davis reported sporadic audio bugs in the PC version such as "loud, horribly distorted" sound samples and voice lines being cut off mid-sentence, and decided that while they did not ruin the experience altogether, they did detract from it.

The storyline received varied responses. Dunham liked the aspect of the narrative being a sequel rather than a straight adaptation, explaining that it "helps keep the mystery of the film while still allowing us to feel a part of it" and suggested that more video game adaptations should adopt the approach. Hopper felt that the story was somewhat convoluted, but regarded it as a noble effort, and admired the number of characters adapted from the comic series. Baker, however, wished that the plot did more to introduce the comic-based antagonists to newcomers, pointing out that they were not as well known as the Joker, Lex Luthor, or Magneto. Davis and Surette dismissed the plot as uncompelling and disjointed, serving only as a means of transitioning between set pieces.

== Followup ==
In February 2004, Vivendi Universal Games confirmed the development of a sequel tentatively titled The Hulk 2, which would not be based on any theatrical production and was slated for a mid-2005 release. Radical Entertainment was influenced by feedback for the previous Hulk game to create an open world title more heavily focused on the Hulk, and collaborated with writer Paul Jenkins and artist Bryan Hitch to create a more authentic comic book experience. The Incredible Hulk: Ultimate Destruction, which had been reworked into a standalone story, was released in 2005 to positive reviews. According to Marvel executive Justin Lambros, the game's lack of connection to a major film resulted in smaller sales figures than its predecessor.
