= Leader (character) =

Marvel Comics supervillain

The Leader
- Variant cover art of Skaar: Son of Hulk #6 (Dec. 2008), art by Francis Tsai

Publication information
- Publisher: Marvel Comics
- First appearance: Tales to Astonish #62 (December 1964)
- Created by: Stan Lee (writer); Steve Ditko (artist)

In-story information
- Alter ego: Samuel Sterns
- Species: Human mutate
- Team affiliations: Intelligencia; Humanoids; Freehold / New Freehold; Riot Squad; Lethal Legion; Thunderbolts
- Partnerships: Abomination; Madman
- Notable aliases: The Red Leader
- Abilities: Superhuman intelligence; Telekinesis; Telepathy; Gamma ray manipulation; Self-resurrection

The Leader (Samuel Sterns) is a supervillain appearing in American comic books published by Marvel Comics. The Leader first appeared in Tales to Astonish #62 (December 1964), created by writer Stan Lee and artist Steve Ditko as the archenemy of the Hulk. He has mainly appeared in Hulk-related comic books over the years and was one of the featured characters in the Marvel NOW! Thunderbolts relaunch.

Sterns worked as a janitor in Boise, Idaho when he was exposed to gamma radiation. This mutated him into a green-skinned, super-intelligent entity who named himself the Leader, embarking on a career of attempts at world domination. He is repeatedly foiled by the Hulk, who overcomes all of the Leader's schemes, as well as his artificial henchmen known as the Humanoids. Sterns would later be further transformed, causing his cranium to change into the shape of an oversized brain. As part of the Intelligencia, he is an integral part of the Hulked Out Heroes storyline.

The character has been adapted from the comics into various forms of media, including television series and video games. Samuel Sterns made his cinematic debut in the Marvel Cinematic Universe (MCU) film The Incredible Hulk (2008), portrayed by Tim Blake Nelson, and returned in Captain America: Brave New World (2025). In 2009, the Leader was ranked as IGN's 63rd Greatest Comic Book Villain of All Time.

== Publication history ==
The character first appeared in Tales to Astonish #62 (December 1964), and was created by Stan Lee and Steve Ditko.

== Fictional character biography ==
Born in Boise, Idaho, Samuel Sterns lived in the shadow of his brilliant brother Phillip, and he worked in a menial capacity for a chemical plant where Phillip was employed as a researcher. While Sterns was transporting radioactive materials, an explosive accident bombarded him with gamma radiation, which turned his skin green, abnormally enlarged his cranium and brain, and granted him a superhuman intellect that reflected his subconscious desire to be smarter than his brother.

Renaming himself the "Leader", he forms an espionage ring to overthrow the United States federal government and enlists the Chameleon to steal high-level secrets. After his plans are duly thwarted by the Hulk, the Leader takes an interest in the Hulk's abilities and captures him with a new invention, the android "Humanoids". However, the Hulk breaks free and destroys the Leader's laboratory, forcing his retreat. The Leader then switches tactics by manipulating the Hulk into helping him steal the Watcher's "Ultimate Machine", a device containing all knowledge in the universe. After obtaining the device and visualizing its contents, the Leader apparently dies of shock, with even his enhanced brain unable to comprehend the knowledge that the Ultimate Machine contains.

The Leader is later resurrected by a Humanoid designed specifically to do so. Months later, he resurfaces to engage in a number of plots against the Hulk, including an alliance with General Ross. He also attempts to steal the U.S. Army's Tripod Observation Module (TOM), nicknamed the Murder Module and then, with the help of the Rhino, interrupts the wedding of Bruce Banner (the Hulk's alter ego) and Betty Ross by shooting Banner with a ray which restores the Hulk to his savage state, gamma-irradiates Manhattan's water supply to transform its inhabitants into loyal servants, and clashes with the Hulk and the Avengers twice. Eventually, the Leader's mutation destabilizes and he reverts to the form of Samuel Sterns. He convinces the Gray Hulk to transfer the gamma radiation from the recently Hulk-like Rick Jones into himself, and the Leader is restored with a new appearance and a psychic link to Rick. The Leader subsequently detonates a gamma bomb in a small Arizona town, killing over 5,000 people. The survivors, now enhanced, provide him with valuable research subjects and a group of superhuman enforcers called the Riot Squad. With their help, he builds a self-sufficient society called "Freehold" in Alberta, populated with civilians dying from radiation poisoning. When the Leader's brother Philip Sterns becomes the Madman, the Leader deems him a threat and sends the Hulk to eliminate him.

When Freehold is targeted by Hydra, the Leader sends his followers to invade the covert Pantheon organization and coerce them into aiding Freehold. To the Hulk's chagrin, the Leader and the Pantheon's head Agamemnon ultimately form an alliance. At the same time, the Leader is experiencing Rick's grief over the recent death of his girlfriend Marlo Chandler. The Leader offers to revive Marlo by using the power of his follower Soul Man, hoping to use Rick as a pawn against the Hulk and taking the opportunity to analyze Soul Man's power in a bid to achieve immortality. Marlo's revival is interrupted by a two-pronged attack on Freehold by the Hulk and Hydra, and the Leader is apparently killed in the crossfire. The now-incorporeal Leader controls his follower Omnibus and attempts to throw the world into a state of war. Omnibus is eventually exposed by his fellow Freehold citizens, exiled into the Arctic, and is eaten by a polar bear.

When Banner is dying from ALS, the Leader summons the Hulk to give him a cure in exchange for witnessing his ascension from the mortal plane. However, he explodes in the process and is reduced to a disembodied head in a tank within a hidden California base.

After the Leader regains his body through unknown means, he is captured by S.H.I.E.L.D. and brought to trial for his crimes, but his attorney manages to have him found not guilty by reason of insanity. Shortly afterward, the Leader discovers he is dying and builds a dome in a Nevada desert to survive. Upon recovering, he joins the Intelligencia and takes part in the creation of the Harpy (Marlo Chandler), the Red Hulk (Thunderbolt Ross), the Red She-Hulk (Betty Ross), and A-Bomb (Rick Jones). However, when Ross discovers that Red She-Hulk is his daughter, he drains the gamma radiation from the Leader's body, depriving him of his super-intelligence and reverting him to his human form.

Subsequently, taken into custody so that he may divulge information on the Intelligencia's plans, Sterns is subjected to a dose of red gamma radiation by the Red Hulk, who intends to make Sterns his intelligence agent. However, Sterns is shot and killed when the Punisher discovers him. The Red Hulk further exposes his body to gamma radiation, which revives him and transforms him into the Red Leader. Initially forced to work for Ross's Thunderbolts, the Red Leader manages to escape and begins to rebuild his criminal empire, but is recaptured. He makes a pact with Mephisto to free himself, and is later dragged to Hell.

After escaping from Mephisto's captivity, the Red Leader is tracked down by "Doc Green", an ingenious and ruthless new personality of the Hulk, and is deprived of his powers. However, the Red Leader had previously taken possession of an artificial intelligence created by Banner, which restores his intellect, powers and original green-skinned complexion.

In the miniseries Hulkverines, the Leader is shown to be detained at Shadow Base Remote Facility 43B using Big Bob's Lumber Lounge in Akron, Ohio as a front. He is approached by Agent Castillo, who informs him that the Hulk has returned from the dead and they need his help to kill him. The Leader accepts, but stabs Castillo, stating that he would rather do it himself. The Leader arrives at the area where the Hulk and Weapon H are fighting each other, until Shadow Base agents led by Agent NG catch up to him. The Leader states to NG that he infected Weapon H with a gamma-altering virus. The Leader brings out the Humanoids, only for them to be regressed back to their pods by reverse-engineered Humanoids when former Weapon X Project scientist Aliana Alba appears and advises the Leader to let her dispose of Wolverine. After a brief fight, the Leader explains that he was pursuing the Hulk, while Alba states that she was pursuing Wolverine. They come to a conclusion that they were manipulated by someone who wants Weapon H dead. This leads to them making plans to capture the Hulk to collaborate on a project.

The Leader begins working on studying the Below-Place where gamma mutates travel to after dying and before resurrecting. He began to learn how to control the Green Door while in the Below-Place. He encountered Brian Banner, who wanted the Leader to help him escape the Below-Place. Instead, the Leader removed his skeleton for research. Following the Hulk's victory over Xemnu, the Leader had Rick Jones send a surge of gamma energy into the Hulk during a photo shoot, which caused him to release a blast of gamma energy where the survivors were saved by Rick Jones, who was mutated to an elongated and multi-limbed form. The Leader uses the Green Door to take over the Hulk and his Green Scar persona, but the Devil Hulk breaks free and confronts him. The Leader briefly distracts Devil Hulk by turning into Brian Banner before transforming into a crab-like monstrosity and grabbing Brian. With the Devil Hulk restrained, the Leader killed him and dragged his remains and Bruce Banner through the Green Door. Now in the Below-Place, the Leader is possessed by the One Below All and grows to a gargantuan size. The Savage Hulk, Joe Fixit, and Jackie McGee manage to travel to the Below-Place using the Fantastic Four's Forever Gate and confront the Leader, who is separated from the One Below All and loses his powers. After the Hulk personas talk with the One-Above-All, the Savage Hulk forgives Sterns for all he did. Sterns is returned to Earth with Jackie, Banner, and the Hulk personas, where he is shackled and presumably taken into police custody.

== Powers and abilities ==
The Leader has superhuman mental acumen as a result of his exposure to an explosion of gamma-irradiated waste. He is capable of knowledge and comprehension that is beyond the human ability to understand. Just as the Hulk has the potential for limitless strength, the Leader has the potential for limitless intelligence, being capable of mastering every worldly subject and adopting concepts completely foreign to his environment. His higher brain functions, including pattern recognition, information storage/retrieval and logical / philosophical structuring have been enhanced to inhuman levels. He also has total recall of every event he has witnessed since the accident that transformed him and can calculate possibilities and outcomes so accurately that it borders on predicting the future. Despite his limitless intelligence and supreme knowledge, his effectiveness as a villain is greatly hampered by his own arrogance, immaturity, impatience and obsession with killing the Hulk, which constantly causes him to lose sight of necessary details and act prematurely, causing the ruin of his schemes. His egotism also briefly led him to embark on two mad and impractical schemes to turn the rest of humanity into gamma mutates like himself.

He has also unlocked latent telekinetic and telepathic powers within himself. He is able to control the minds of ordinary humans by merely touching them (aside from gamma-mutated individuals like the Hulk or the Abomination), mind-wipe the memories of several humans at once, create illusions to trick others or disguise himself, and project telekinetic blasts potent enough to topple a very weakened Hulk.

The Leader is also a technological genius that specializes in gamma radiation. He has created technology that is beyond human ability, including vehicles, weaponry, computers, laser pistols, pulse weapons and kinetic gauntlets, and is particularly adept at genetic engineering and manipulating radiation for many nefarious purposes. The Leader has created an army of synthetic henchmen at his disposal called the "Humanoids" that have served him throughout his career of world domination, mainly as bodyguards, soldiers and laboratory servants. They have versatile programming capacities to allow them to perform any task, do not tire, talk or need sustenance and have elastic-like bodies that make them immune to blunt impacts. They range in size from microscopic to hundreds of feet tall. The Humanoids are usually controlled directly through the Leader's own mental commands, but can also be pre-programmed to carry out a certain directive. The Leader has also developed gamma bombs, shield generators to cover large areas, cages for holding the Hulk, powered armor, teleportation devices, android duplicates, a means of controlling the minds of the Hulk or the Rhino through technological devices, a special Humanoid which was programmed to bring him back to life in the event of his death by using a device called the Revivo-Beam that was also made to do so and Omnivac, a sentient computer that maintains the enormous space station that he has used as a base of operations.

On occasion, the Leader has been shown to have the ability to change himself back into Samuel Sterns, but this ability resulted in him losing all memory of his identity as the Leader, as Sterns' mind was ill-equipped to cope with the Leader's intellect (although he always remembered everything when he changed back into the Leader again). It has been revealed when the Leader changes back into Sterns, Sterns gets a little smarter each time this happens (although Sterns is still nowhere near the Leader as far as intellect is concerned).

== Other versions ==
=== Marvel Zombies ===
A zombified alternate universe version of the Leader from Earth-2149 appears in Marvel Zombies.

=== Ultimate Marvel ===
Two characters based on the Leader appear in the Ultimate Marvel universe: Samuel Sterns is an elderly doctor and member of Roxxon Energy Corporation's brain trust, while Pete Wisdom is a former member of MI6 who transformed himself using the "British Enhancile Program". He has psychic and mental abilities similar to the original Leader, but requires a wheelchair and a halo-like brace to support his head.

== Reception ==
In 2009, the Leader was ranked as IGN's 63rd Greatest Comic Book Villain of All Time.

== In other media ==
=== Television ===
- The Leader appears in "The Incredible Hulk" segment of The Marvel Super Heroes, voiced by Gillie Fenwick.
- The Leader appears in The Incredible Hulk (1982) episode "Punks on Wheels", voiced by G. Stanley Jones.
- The Leader appears in the Iron Man episode "Hulk Buster", voiced by Matt Frewer.
- The Leader appears in The Incredible Hulk (1996), voiced again by Matt Frewer. This version was a scientist who sabotaged the gamma bomb that turned Bruce Banner into the Hulk, but fell into a pit of radioactive waste created by it and was mutated into the Leader.
- The Leader makes a non-speaking cameo appearance in The Super Hero Squad Show episode "Tremble at the Might of... M.O.D.O.K.!".
- The Leader appears in The Avengers: Earth's Mightiest Heroes, voiced by Jeffrey Combs.
- The Leader appears in Hulk and the Agents of S.M.A.S.H., voiced by James Arnold Taylor.
- The Leader appears in the Ultimate Spider-Man episode "Contest of Champions", voiced again by James Arnold Taylor.
- The Leader appears in Avengers Assemble, voiced again by James Arnold Taylor. This version is a member of the Cabal.
- The Leader appears in Marvel Future Avengers, voiced by Yoshihito Sasaki in Japanese and Benjamin Diskin in English. This version is a member of Kang the Conqueror's Masters of Evil.
- The Leader appears in the M.O.D.O.K. episode "If Saturday Be... For the Boys!", voiced by Bill Hader.

=== Film ===
The Leader appears in several drafts for unproduced scripts for a Hulk film, including one penned by John Turman seeing him renamed Edward Leder.

=== Marvel Cinematic Universe ===
Dr. Samuel Sterns appears in media set in the Marvel Cinematic Universe (MCU), portrayed by Tim Blake Nelson. This version is a Harlem-based university professor who, while helping Bruce Banner find a cure for his transformations, replicates various samples of Banner's blood. After being forced to transform Emil Blonsky into the Abomination, the latter injures Sterns, who is cross-contaminated with one of Banner's blood samples. First appearing in the film The Incredible Hulk (2008), Sterns makes subsequent appearances in the tie-in comics Fury's Big Week and the film Captain America: Brave New World (2025).

=== Video games ===
- The Leader appears in The Incredible Hulk (1994).
- The Leader appears in Hulk, voiced by Michael Dobson. This version possesses levitation and teleportation capabilities as well as psionic abilities such as telekinesis, energy projection, and creating illusions of himself.
- Dr. Samuel Sterns appears in The Incredible Hulk (2008), voiced by Tim Blake Nelson.
- The Leader appears as a playable character in Lego Marvel Super Heroes, voiced again by Jeffrey Combs.
- The Leader and his Red Leader form appears in Marvel: Avengers Alliance.
- The Leader appears as a playable character in Lego Marvel's Avengers.
- The Leader appears as a playable character in Marvel Avengers Academy, voiced by Vince Melamed.
- The Leader appears in Marvel Snap.

=== Miscellaneous ===
The Leader appears in the X-Men/Avengers crossover trilogy Gamma Quest by Greg Cox. He allies with the Super-Skrull to enhance the latter's abilities with the powers of various other superhumans. However, Rogue borrows enough of the Leader's intellect to reverse the procedure and return the Super-Skrull to his usual power levels.
