= List of Marvel Comics publications (H–L) =

Marvel Comics is an American comic book company dating to 1961. This is a list of the publications it has released in its history under the "Marvel Comics" imprint. The list does not include collected editions; trade paperbacks; digital comics; free, promotional giveaways; sketchbooks; poster books or magazines, nor does it include series published by other Marvel imprints such as Epic, Icon or Star. It also does not include titles published by Marvel's pre-1961 predecessors Timely Comics and Atlas Comics.

- List of Marvel Comics publications (A)
- List of Marvel Comics publications (B–C)
- List of Marvel Comics publications (D–E)
- List of Marvel Comics publications (F–G)
- List of Marvel Comics publications (M)
- List of Marvel Comics publications (N–R)
- List of Marvel Comics publications (S)
- List of Marvel Comics publications (T–V)
- List of Marvel Comics publications (W–Z)

== H ==
Title	Series	Issues	Dates	Notes	Reference
Hail Hydra		#1–4	Sep 2015 – Jan 2016	limited series; Secret Wars (2015) tie-in	
Hallows' Eve		#1–5	May 2023 – Sep 2023	limited series	
Hallows' Eve	The Big Night	#1	Dec 2023	one-shot	
Halloween Megazine		#1	Dec 1996	one-shot	
Halo	The Graphic Novel		2006	graphic novel	
Halo	Blood Line	#1–5	Feb 2010 – Jul 2010	limited series	
Halo	Fall of Reach: Boot Camp	#1–4	Nov 2010 – Apr 2011	limited series	
Halo	Fall of Reach: Covenant	#1–4	Jun 2011 – Dec 2011	limited series	
Halo	Fall of Reach: Invasion	#1–4	Mar 2012 – Aug 2012	limited series	
Halo	Helljumper	#1–5	Sep 2009 – Jan 2010	limited series	
Halo	Uprising	#1–4	Oct 2007 – Jan 2008	limited series	
Han Solo		#1–5	Aug 2016 – Jan 2017	limited series; also known as Star Wars: Han Solo	
The Handbook of the Conan Universe		#1	Jan 1986	one-shot; also known as The Official Handbook of The Conan Universe	
Hank Johnson, Agent of Hydra		#1	Oct 2015	one-shot; Secret Wars (2015) tie-in	
Harvey		#1–6	Oct 1970 – Dec 1972		
Haunt of Horror	Edgar Allan Poe	#1–3	Jul 2006 – Sep 2006	limited series	
Haunt of Horror	Lovecraft	#1–3	Aug 2008 – Oct 2008	limited series	
Haunted Mansion		#1–5	May 2016 – Sep 2016	limited series	
Havok & Wolverine: Meltdown		#1–4	Nov 1988 – Feb 1989	limited series; published under the Epic Comics imprint	
Hawkeye	vol. 1	#1–4	Sep 1983 – Dec 1983	limited series	
Hawkeye	vol. 2	#1–4	Jan 1994 – Apr 1994	limited series	
Hawkeye	vol. 3	#1–8	Dec 2003 – Aug 2004		
Hawkeye	vol. 4	#1–22	Oct 2012 – Sep 2015		
Hawkeye	vol. 4	Annual #1	2013		
Hawkeye	vol. 5	#1–16	Feb 2017 – May 2018		
Hawkeye	Blindspot	#1–4	Apr 2011 – Jul 2011	limited series	
Hawkeye	Earth's Mightiest Marksman	#1	Oct 1998	one-shot	
Hawkeye	Freefall	#1–6	Mar 2020 – Nov 2020	limited series	
Hawkeye	Kate Bishop	#1–5	Jan 2022 – May 2022	limited series	
Hawkeye & Mockingbird		#1–6	Aug 2010 – Jan 2011		
Hawkeye vs. Deadpool		#0–4	Nov 2014 – Mar 2015	limited series	
The Hedge Knight II: Sworn Sword		#1–6	Jun 2007 – Jun 2008	limited series	
Hell's Angel		#1–5	Jul 1992 – Nov 1992	continued as Dark Angel	
Hellcat	vol. 1	#1–3	Sep 2000 – Nov 2000	limited series	
Hellcat	vol. 2	#1–5	May 2023 – Sep 2023	limited series	
Hellhunters		#1–5	Feb 2025 – Jun 2025	limited series	
Hellions		#1–18	May 2020 – Feb 2022		
Hellstorm	Prince of Lies	#1–21	Apr 1993 – Dec 1994		
Hellstorm	Son of Satan	#1–5	Dec 2006 – Apr 2007	limited series	
Hellverine	vol. 1	#1–4	Jul 2024 – Oct 2024	limited series	
Hellverine	vol. 2	#1–10	Feb 2025 – Nov 2025		
Her-oes		#1–4	Jun 2010 – Sep 2010	limited series	
Heralds		#1–5	Aug 2010	limited series	
Herc		#1–10 6.1	Jun 2011 – Jan 2012		
Hercules	vol. 1	#1–4	Sep 1982 – Dec 1982	limited series	
Hercules	vol. 2	#1–4	Mar 1984 – Jun 1984	limited series	
Hercules	vol. 3	#1–5	Jun 2005 – Sep 2005	limited series	
Hercules	vol. 4	#1–6	Jan 2016 – Jun 2016	limited series	
Hercules	Fall of an Avenger	#1–2	May 2010 – Jun 2010	limited series	
Hercules	Heart of Chaos	#1–3	Aug 1997 – Oct 1997	limited series	
Hercules	Twilight of a God	#1–4	Aug 2010 – Nov 2010	limited series	
Hero		#1–6	May 1990 – Oct 1990	limited series	
Hero For Hire		#1–16	Jun 1972 – Dec 1973	continued as Power Man	
Heroes		#1	Dec 2001	one-shot	
Heroes at Home		#1	2020	graphic novel	
Heroes for Hire	vol. 1	#1–19	Aug 1997 – Jan 1999		
Heroes for Hire	vol. 1	Heroes for Hire/Quicksilver '98	1998	Annual	
Heroes for Hire	vol. 2	#1–15	Oct 2006 – Dec 2007	Civil War tie-in initially; continued as on-going series	
Heroes for Hire	vol. 3	#1–12	Feb 2011 – Nov 2011		
Heroes for Hope Starring the X-Men		#1	Dec 1985	one-shot	
Heroes Reborn (2000)	Ashema	#1	Jan 2000	one-shot	
Heroes Reborn (2000)	Doom	#1	Jan 2000	one-shot	
Heroes Reborn (2000)	Doomsday	#1	Jan 2000	one-shot	
Heroes Reborn (2000)	Masters of Evil	#1	Jan 2000	one-shot	
Heroes Reborn (2000)	Rebel	#1	Jan 2000	one-shot	
Heroes Reborn (2000)	Remnants	#1	Jan 2000	one-shot	
Heroes Reborn (2000)	Young Allies	#1	Jan 2000	one-shot	
Heroes Reborn (2021)		#1–7	Jul 2021 – Aug 2021	limited series; concluded as Heroes Return	
Heroes Reborn (2021)	American Knights	#1	Aug 2021	one-shot	
Heroes Reborn (2021)	Hyperion & the Imperial Guard	#1	Jul 2021	one-shot	
Heroes Reborn (2021)	Magneto & the Mutant Force	#1	Jul 2021	one-shot	
Heroes Reborn (2021)	Marvel Double Action	#1	Aug 2021	one-shot	
Heroes Reborn (2021)	Night-Gwen	#1	Aug 2021	one-shot	
Heroes Reborn (2021)	Peter Parker, The Amazing Shutterbug	#1	Jul 2021	one-shot	
Heroes Reborn (2021)	Siege Society	#1	Jul 2021	one-shot	
Heroes Reborn (2021)	Squadron Savage	#1	Aug 2021	one-shot	
Heroes Reborn (2021)	Weapon X & Final Flight	#1	Aug 2021	one-shot	
Heroes Reborn (2021)	Young Squadron	#1	Jul 2021	one-shot	
Heroes Reborn: The Return		#1–4	Dec 1997	limited series	
Heroes Return		#1	Aug 2021	one-shot; continued from Heroes Reborn (2021)	
Heroic Age	Heroes	#1	Nov 2010	one-shot	
Heroic Age	One Month to Live	#1–5	Nov 2010	limited series	
Heroic Age	Prince of Power	#1–4	Jul 2010 – Oct 2010	limited series	
Heroic Age	Villains	#1	Jan 2011	one-shot	
Heroic Age	X-Men	#1	Feb 2011	one-shot	
The History of Marvels Comics		#1	Jul 2000	one-shot	
History of the Marvel Universe (2012)		#1	Jan 2012	one-shot	
History of the Marvel Universe (2019)		#1–6	Sep 2019 – Feb 2020	limited series	
Hit-Monkey	vol. 1	#1	Apr 2010	one-shot	
Hit-Monkey	vol. 2	#1–3	Sep 2010 – Nov 2010	limited series	
Hokum & Hex		#1–9	Sep 1993 – May 1994		
Homer the Happy Ghost	vol. 2	#1–4	Nov 1969 – May 1970	vol. 1 published by Atlas Comics	
The Hood		#1–6	Jul 2002 – Dec 2002	limited series	
Hook		#1–4	Feb 1992 – Mar 1992	limited series; adaptation of 1991 film	
House II: The Second Story		#1	Oct 1987	movie adaptation	
House of M	vol. 1	#1–8	Aug 2005 – Dec 2005	limited series	
House of M	vol. 2	#1–4	Oct 2015 – Dec 2015	limited series; Secret Wars (2015) tie-in	
House of M	Avengers	#1–5	Jan 2008 – Apr 2008	limited series	
House of M	Masters of Evil	#1–4	Oct 2009 – Jan 2010	limited series	
House of X		#1–6	Sep 2019 – Dec 2019	limited series	
How to Read Comics the Marvel Way		#1–4	Feb 2022	limited series; released digitally-only due to COVID-19 pandemic; originally intended for print release	
Howard the Duck	vol. 1	#1–31	Jan 1976 – May 1979		
Howard the Duck	vol. 1	#32–33	Jan 1986 – Sep 1986		
Howard the Duck	vol. 1	Annual #1	1977		
Howard the Duck	vol. 2	#1–9	Oct 1979 – Mar 1981		
Howard the Duck	vol. 3	#1–6	Mar 2002 – Aug 2002	limited series	
Howard the Duck	vol. 4	#1–4	Dec 2007 – Mar 2008	limited series	
Howard the Duck	vol. 5	#1–5	May 2015 – Oct 2015	limited series	
Howard the Duck	vol. 6	#1–11	Jan 2016 – Dec 2016		
Howard the Duck	vol. 7	#1	Jan 2024	one-shot	
Howard the Duck	Holiday Special	#1	Feb 1997	one-shot	
Howard the Duck	The Movie	#1–3	Dec 1986 – Feb 1987	limited series; adaptation of the 1986 movie	
Howard the Human		#1	Oct 2015	one-shot; Secret Wars (2015) tie-in	
Howling Commandos of S.H.I.E.L.D.		#1–6	Dec 2015 – May 2016		
Hulk	vol. 1	#10–27	Aug 1978 – Jun 1981	continued from Rampaging Hulk	
Hulk	vol. 2	#1–11	Apr 1999 – Feb 2000	continued as Incredible Hulk vol. 3	
Hulk	vol. 2	1999	1999	Annual	
Hulk	vol. 3	#1–57 30.1	Mar 2008 – Oct 2012	continued as Red She-Hulk	
Hulk	vol. 3	King-Size #1	Jul 2008		
Hulk	vol. 4	#1–16	Jun 2014 – Jul 2015		
Hulk	vol. 4	Annual #1	Nov 2014		
Hulk	vol. 5	#1–11	Feb 2017 – Dec 2017	continued as She-Hulk vol. 4	
Hulk	vol. 6	#1–14	Jan 2022 – Jun 2023		
Hulk	vol. 7	Annual #1	Jul 2023		
Hulk	Blood Hunt	#1	Sep 2024	one-shot	
Hulk	Broken Worlds	#1–2	May 2009 – Jul 2009	limited series	
Hulk	Destruction	#1–4	Sep 2005 – Dec 2005	limited series	
Hulk	Future Imperfect	#1–2	Dec 1992 – Jan 1993	limited series	
Hulk	Gamma Games	#1–3	Feb 2004 – Apr 2004	limited series	
Hulk	Giant-Size vol. 1	#1	1975	one-shot	
Hulk	Giant-Size vol. 2	#1	Aug 2006	one-shot	
Hulk	Gray	#1–6	Dec 2003 – Apr 2004	limited series	
Hulk	Let the Battle Begin	#1	May 2010	one-shot	
Hulk	Monster-Size Special	#1	Dec 2008	one-shot	
Hulk	Nightmerica	#1–6	Aug 2003 – Apr 2004	limited series	
Hulk	Raging Thunder	#1	Aug 2008	one-shot	
Hulk	Smash Everything	#1–5	Feb 2026 – Jun 2026	limited series	
Hulk	The Movie Adaptation	#1	Aug 2003	one-shot; adaptation of the 2003 film	
Hulk	Unchained	#1–3	Mar 2004 – May 2004	limited series	
Hulk	Winter Guard	#1	Feb 2010	one-shot	
Hulk/Pitt		#1	Dec 1996	one-shot	
Hulk/Wolverine: 6 Hours		#1–4	Mar 2003 – May 2003	limited series	
Hulk 2099		#1–10	Dec 1994 – Sep 1995		
Hulk & Doctor Strange		#1	Jul 2025	one-shot	
Hulk and Power Pack		#1–4	May 2007 – Aug 2007	limited series	
Hulk & Thing: Hard Knocks		#1–4	Nov 2004 – Feb 2005	limited series	
Hulk Chronicles: WWH		#1–6	Oct 2008 – Mar 2009	limited series	
Hulk Family: Green Genes		#1	Feb 2009	one-shot	
Hulk: Grand Design	Madness	#1	Jun 2022	one-shot; part two of two	
Hulk: Grand Design	Monster	#1	May 2022	one-shot; part one of two	
Hulk Smash		#1–2	Mar 2001 – Apr 2001	limited series	
Hulk Smash Avengers		#1–5	Jul 2012	limited series	
Hulk Team-Up		#1	Nov 2009	one-shot	
Hulk vs.	Fin Fang Foom	#1	Feb 2008	one-shot	
Hulk vs.	Hercules: When Titans Collide	#1	Jun 2008	one-shot	
Hulk vs.	Thor: Banner of War Alpha	#1	Jul 2022	one-shot	
Hulk-Sized Mini-Hulks		#1	Aug 2011	one-shot	
Hulkling & Wiccan		#1	Aug 2022	one-shot	
Hulkverines		#1–3	Apr 2019 – Jun 2019	limited series	
The Human Fly		#1–19	Sep 1977 – May 1979		
Human Torch	vol. 2	#1–8	Sep 1974 – Nov 1975	vol. 1 was published by Timely Comics	
Human Torch	vol. 3	#1–12	Jun 2003 – Jun 2004		
Human Torch Comics 70th Anniversary Special		#1	Jul 2009	one-shot	
Hunger		#1–4	Sep 2013 – Dec 2013	limited series	
Hunt for Wolverine		#1	Jun 2018	one-shot	
Hunt for Wolverine	Adamantium Agenda	#1–4	Jul 2018 – Oct 2018	limited series	
Hunt for Wolverine	Dead Ends	#1	Oct 2018	one-shot	
Hunt for Wolverine	Mystery in Madripoor	#1–4	Jul 2018 – Oct 2018	limited series	
Hunt for Wolverine	The Claws of a Killer	#1–4	Jul 2018 – Oct 2018	limited series	
Hunt for Wolverine	Weapon Lost	#1–4	Jul 2018 – Oct 2018	limited series	
Husk		#1–2	May 2010 – Jun 2010	limited series	
Hyperion		#1–6	May 2016 – Oct 2016	limited series	
Hyperkind		#1–9	Sep 1993 – May 1994		
Hyperkind Unleashed		#1	Sep 1994	one-shot	

== I ==
Title	Series	Issues	Dates	Notes	Reference
I Am an Avenger		#1–5	Nov 2010 – Mar 2011	limited series	
I Am Groot		#1–5	Jul 2017 – Nov 2017		
I Am Iron Man		#1–5	May 2023 – Sep 2023	limited series	
Iceman	vol. 1	#1–4	Dec 1984 – Jun 1985	limited series	
Iceman	vol. 2	#1–4	Dec 2001 – Mar 2002	limited series	
Iceman	vol. 3	#1–11	Aug 2017 – May 2018		
Iceman	vol. 4	#1–5	Nov 2018 – Mar 2019	limited series	
Iceman	Omega	#1	May 2026	one-shot	
Iceman and Angel		#1	May 2011	one-shot	
ID4: Independence Day		#0–2	Jun 1996 – Jul 1996	limited series; adaptation of the 1996 film	
Identity Disc		#1–5	Aug 2004 – Dec 2004	limited series	
I (heart) Marvel	Marvel Ai	#1	Apr 2006	one-shot	
I (heart) Marvel	Masked Intentions	#1	May 2006	one-shot	
I (heart) Marvel	My Mutant Heart	#1	Apr 2006	one-shot	
I (heart) Marvel	Outlaw Love	#1	Apr 2006	one-shot	
I (heart) Marvel	Web of Romance	#1	Apr 2006	one-shot	
Illuminati		#1–7	Jan 2016 – Jul 2016	limited series	
Illuminator		#1–3	1993	limited series	
Immoral X-Men		#1–3	Apr 2023 – Jun 2023	limited series; Sins of Sinister tie-in	
Immortal Hulk		#0–50	Aug 2018 – Dec 2021		
Immortal Hulk	Flatline	#1	Apr 2021	one-shot	
Immortal Hulk	Great Power	#1	Apr 2020	one-shot	
Immortal Hulk	The Threshing Place	#1	Nov 2020	one-shot	
Immortal Hulk	Time Of Monsters	#1	Jul 2021	one-shot	
The Immortal Iron Fist		#1–27	Jan 2007 – Aug 2009		
The Immortal Iron Fist		Annual #1	Nov 2007		
The Immortal Iron Fist	Orson Randall and The Death Queen of California	#1	Nov 2008	one-shot	
The Immortal Iron Fist	Orson Randall and The Green Mist of Death	#1	Apr 2008	one-shot	
Immortal She-Hulk		#1	Nov 2020	one-shot	
Immortal Thor		#1–25	Oct 2023 – Sep 2025		
Immortal Thor		Annual #1	2024		
Immortal Weapons		#1–5	Sep 2009 – Jan 2010	limited series	
Immortal X-Men		#1–18	May 2022 – Feb 2024		
Imperial		#1–4	Aug 2025 – Dec 2025	limited series	
Imperial Guard		#1–3	Jan 1997 – Mar 1997	limited series	
Imperial Guardians		#1–5	May 2026 – Sep 2026		
Imperial War	Black Panther	#1	Oct 2025	one-shot	
Imperial War	Exiles	#1	Nov 2025	one-shot	
Imperial War	Imperial Guardians	#1	Dec 2025	one-shot	
Imperial War	Nova - Centurion	#1	Nov 2025	one-shot	
Imperial War	Planet She-Hulk	#1	Oct 2025	one-shot	
The Impossible Man Summer Vacation Spectacular		#1–2	Aug 1990 – Sep 1991		
In His Steps			Feb 1994	graphic novel adaptation	
Incoming!		#1	Feb 2020	one-shot	
The Incomplete Death's Head		#1–12	Jan 1993 – Dec 1993	limited series	
Incredible Hercules		#113–141	Feb 2008 – Apr 2010	continued from Incredible Hulk vol. 3	
Incredible Hulk	vol. 1	#1–6	May 1962 – Mar 1963		
Incredible Hulk	vol. 2	#102–474 -1	Apr 1968 – Mar 1999	continued from Tales to Astonish vol. 1	
Incredible Hulk	vol. 2	'97	1997	Annuals	
Incredible Hulk	vol. 2	Hulk/Sub-Mariner '98	1998	Annuals	
Incredible Hulk	vol. 2	Annual #5–20	1976 – 1994	Annuals	
Incredible Hulk	vol. 2	Special #1–4	Oct 1968 – Jan 1972	Annuals	
Incredible Hulk	vol. 3	#12–112	Mar 2000 – Jan 2008	continued from Hulk vol. 2; continued with Incredible Hercules; issues #27–33 are dual numbered as #501–507	
Incredible Hulk	vol. 3	Giant-Size #1	Jul 2008		
Incredible Hulk	vol. 3	2000, 2001	2000 – 2001	Annuals	
Incredible Hulk	vol. 4	#600–611	Sep 2009 – Oct 2010	continued as Incredible Hulks	
Incredible Hulk	vol. 5	#1–15; 7.1	Dec 2011 – Dec 2012		
Incredible Hulk	vol. 6	#709–717	Dec 2017 – Jul 2018	merged with Totally Awesome Hulk; numbering continued from vol. 1 of Tales to Astonish	
Incredible Hulk	vol. 7	#1–30	Aug 2023 – Dec 2025		
Incredible Hulk	vol. 7	Annual #1	2024		
Incredible Hulk	Hercules Unleashed	#1	Oct 1996	one-shot	
Incredible Hulk	Last Call	#1	Aug 2019	one-shot	
Incredible Hulk	The End	#1	Aug 2002	one-shot	
Incredible Hulk and Wolverine		#1	Oct 1986	one-shot	
Incredible Hulk vs.	Quasimodo	#1	Mar 1983	one-shot	
Incredible Hulk vs.	Superman	#1	Jul 1999	one-shot; co-published with DC	
Incredible Hulk vs.	Venom	#1	Apr 1994	one-shot	
Incredible Hulks		#612–635	Nov 2010 – Oct 2011	continued from Incredible Hulk vol. 4	
Incredible Hulks		Annual #1	Aug 2011		
Incredible Hulks	Enigma Force	#1–3	Nov 2010 – Jan 2011	limited series	
Incursions	X-Men	#1	Jan 2027	one-shot; also known as X-Men: Incursions	
Indestructible Hulk		#1–20	Jan 2013 – May 2014		
Indestructible Hulk		Annual #1	Feb 2014		
Indestructible Hulk		Special #1	Dec 2013		
Indiana Jones and the Last Crusade		#1–4	Oct 1989 – Nov 1989	limited series; movie adaptation	
Indiana Jones and the Temple of Doom		#1–3	Sep 1984 – Nov 1984	limited series; movie adaptation	
Indomitable Iron Man		#1	Apr 2010	one-shot	
Infamous Iron Man		#1–12	Dec 2016 – Nov 2017		
Infernal Hulk		#1–10	Jan 2026 – Oct 2026	also known as The Infernal Hulk	
Infernal Hulk vs.	Fantastic Four	#1	Dec 2026	one-shot; part two of four	
Infernal Hulk vs.	Spider-Man	#1	Jan 2027	one-shot; part three of four	
Infernal Hulk vs.	Wolverine	#1	Nov 2026	one-shot; part one of four	
Infernal Man-Thing		#1–3	Sep 2012 – Oct 2012	limited series	
Inferno	vol. 1	#1–5	July 2015 – Nov 2015	limited series; Secret Wars (2015) tie-in	
Inferno	vol. 2	#1–4	Nov 2021 – Mar 2022	limited series	
Infinity		#1–6	Oct 2013 – Jan 2014	limited series	
Infinity Abyss		#1–6	Aug 2002 – Oct 2002	limited series; also known as Thanos: Infinity Abyss	
Infinity Countdown		#1–5	May 2018 – Sep 2018	limited series	
Infinity Countdown	Adam Warlock	#1	Apr 2018	one-shot	
Infinity Countdown	Black Widow	#1	Aug 2018	one-shot	
Infinity Countdown	Captain Marvel	#1	Jul 2018	one-shot	
Infinity Countdown	Champions	#1–2	Aug 2018 – Sep 2018	limited series	
Infinity Countdown	Daredevil	#1	Jul 2018	one-shot	
Infinity Countdown	Darkhawk	#1–4	Jul 2018 – Sep 2018	limited series	
Infinity Countdown	Prime	#1	Apr 2018	one-shot	
Infinity Crusade		#1–6	Jun 1993 – Nov 1993	limited series	
Infinity Entity		#1–4	May 2016 – Jun 2016	limited series	
The Infinity Gauntlet	vol. 1	#1–6	Jul 1991 – Dec 1991	limited series	
The Infinity Gauntlet	vol. 2	#1–5	Jul 2015 – Jan 2016	limited series; Secret Wars (2015) tie-in	
Infinity: Heist		#1–4	Nov 2013 – Mar 2014	limited series	
Infinity: The Hunt		#1–4	Nov 2013 – Jan 2014	limited series	
The Infinity War		#1–6	Jun 1992 – Nov 1992	limited series	
Infinity Warps		#1–2	Jan 2019 – Feb 2019	limited series; Infinity Wars tie-in	
Infinity Warps	Arachknight	#1–2	Dec 2018 – Jan 2019	limited series; Infinity Wars tie-in	
Infinity Warps	Ghost Panther	#1–2	Jan 2019 – Feb 2019	limited series; Infinity Wars tie-in	
Infinity Warps	Iron Hammer	#1–2	Nov 2018 – Dec 2019	limited series; Infinity Wars tie-in	
Infinity Warps	Soldier Supreme	#1–2	Nov 2018 – Dec 2019	limited series; Infinity Wars tie-in	
Infinity Warps	Weapon Hex	#1–2	Dec 2018 – Jan 2019	limited series; Infinity Wars tie-in	
Infinity Wars		#1–6	Oct 2018 – Feb 2019	limited series	
Infinity Wars	Fallen Guardian	#1	Feb 2019	one-shot	
Infinity Wars	Infinity	#1	Mar 2019	one-shot	
Infinity Wars	Prime	#1	Sep 2018	one-shot	
Infinity Wars	Sleepwalker	#1–4	Dec 2018 – Feb 2019	limited series	
Infinity Watch		#1–5	Feb 2025 – Jul 2025	limited series	
Inglorious X-Force		#1–10	Mar 2026 – Dec 2026		
Inhuman		#1–14	Jun 2014 – Jun 2015		
Inhuman		Annual #1	Jul 2015		
Inhuman		Special #1	Jun 2015		
Inhumanity		#1–2	Feb 2014 – Mar 2014	limited series	
Inhumanity	Superior Spider-Man	#1	Mar 2014	one-shot	
Inhumanity	The Awakening	#1–2	Feb 2014 – Mar 2014	limited series	
Inhumans	vol. 1	#1–12	Oct 1975 – Aug 1977		
Inhumans	vol. 2	#1–12	Nov 1998 – Oct 1999	limited series	
Inhumans	vol. 3	#1–4	Jun 2000 – Oct 2000	limited series	
Inhumans	vol. 4	#1–12	Jun 2003 – Jun 2004	limited series	
Inhumans	Attilan Rising	#1–5	Jul 2015 – Nov 2015	limited series; Secret Wars (2015) tie-in	
Inhumans	Judgment Day	#1	Mar 2018	one-shot	
Inhumans	Once and Future Kings	#1–5	Oct 2017 – Feb 2018	limited series	
Inhumans	Prime	#1	May 2017	one-shot	
Inhumans	Special	#1	Apr 1990	one-shot	
Inhumans	The Great Refuge	#1	May 1995	one-shot	
Inhumans 2099		#1	Nov 2004	one-shot	
International Iron Man		#1–7	May 2016 – Nov 2016		
The Invaders	vol. 1	#1–41	Aug 1975 – Sep 1979		
The Invaders	vol. 1	Annual #1	1977		
The Invaders	vol. 1	Giant-Size #1	Jun 1975		
The Invaders	vol. 2	#1–4	May 1993 – Aug 1993	limited series	
The Invaders	vol. 3	#1–12	Mar 2019 – Feb 2020		
The Invaders	Giant-Size	#2	2005	numbering continued from vol. 1	
Invaders Now!		#1–5	Nov 2010 – Mar 2011	limited series	
The Invincible Iron Man	vol. 1	#17–28	Jun 2007 – Jun 2008	continued from Iron Man vol. 4; continued as Iron Man: Director of S.H.I.E.L.D.	
The Invincible Iron Man	vol. 2	#1–33; 500–527; 500.1	Jul 2008 – Dec 2012	renumbered after #33 to #500	
The Invincible Iron Man	vol. 2	Annual #1	Aug 2010		
The Invincible Iron Man	vol. 3	#1–14	Dec 2015 – Dec 2016		
The Invincible Iron Man	vol. 4	#1–11	Jan 2017 – Nov 2017		
The Invincible Iron Man	vol. 5	#593–600	Dec 2017 – Jul 2018	numbering continued from vol. 1 of Iron Man	
The Invincible Iron Man	vol. 6	#1–20	Feb 2023 – Sep 2024		
Invisible Woman		#1–5	Sep 2019 – Jan 2020	limited series	
Iron & Frost		#1–3	Dec 2025 – Feb 2026	limited series; Age of Revelation tie-in	
Iron Age		#1–3	Aug 2011 – Oct 2011	limited series	
Iron Age	Alpha	#1	Aug 2011	one-shot	
Iron Age	Omega	#1	Oct 2011	one-shot	
Iron Cat		#1–5	Aug 2022 – Dec 2022	limited series	
Iron Fist	vol. 1	#1–15	Nov 1975 – Sep 1977		
Iron Fist	vol. 2	#1–2	Sep 1996 – Oct 1996	limited series	
Iron Fist	vol. 3	#1–3	Jul 1998 – Sep 1998	limited series	
Iron Fist	vol. 4	#1–6	May 2004 – Oct 2004		
Iron Fist	vol. 5	#1–7	May 2017 – Nov 2017		
Iron Fist	vol. 6	#73–80	Dec 2017 – Jun 2018	numbering continued from vol. 1	
Iron Fist	vol. 7	#1–5	Apr 2022 – Oct 2022	limited series	
Iron Fist	50th Anniversary Special	#1	Oct 2024	one-shot	
Iron Fist	Heart of the Dragon	#1–6	Mar 2021 – Aug 2021	limited series	
Iron Fist	The Living Weapon	#1–12	Jun 2014 – Jul 2015		
Iron Fist	Wolverine	#1–4	Nov 2000 – Feb 2001	limited series	
Iron Lantern		#1	Jun 1997	One-shot; published under the Amalgam Comics imprint in association with DC	
Iron Man	vol. 1	#1–332	May 1968 – Sep 1996		
Iron Man	vol. 1	Annual #3–15	1976 – 1994	numbering continued from Iron Man Special #2	
Iron Man	vol. 1	Giant-Size #1	Oct 1975		
Iron Man	vol. 1	Special #1–2	Aug 1970 – Nov 1971		
Iron Man	vol. 2	#1–13	Nov 1996 – Nov 1997		
Iron Man	vol. 3	#1–89	Feb 1998 – Dec 2004	issues #41–89 are dual numbered #386–434	
Iron Man	vol. 3	Iron Man/Captain America '98	1998	Annual	
Iron Man	vol. 3	1999, 2000, 2001	1999 – 2001	Annuals	
Iron Man	vol. 4	#1–16	Jan 2005 – May 2007	continued as The Invincible Iron Man vol. 1	
Iron Man	vol. 5	#1–28 20.INH	Jan 2013 – Aug 2014		
Iron Man	vol. 5	Annual #1	2014		
Iron Man	vol. 5	Special #1	Sep 2014		
Iron Man	vol. 6	#1–25	Nov 2020 – Jan 2023		
Iron Man	vol. 6	Annual #1	2021		
Iron Man	vol. 6	Iron Man/Hellcat Annual #1	2022		
Iron Man	vol. 7	Annual #1	2023	one-shot	
Iron Man	vol. 8	#1–10	Dec 2024 – Sep 2025		
Iron Man	vol. 9	#1–	Mar 2026 – present		
Iron Man	Armored Adventures	#1	Sep 2009	one-shot	
Iron Man	Armor Wars	#1–4	Oct 2009 – Jan 2010	limited series	
Iron Man	Bad Blood	#1–4	Sep 2000 – Dec 2000	limited series	
Iron Man	Battlebook: Streets Of Fire	#1	Nov 1998	one-shot	
Iron Man	Collector's Preview	#1	Nov 1994	one-shot; also known as Iron Man & Force Works Collector's Preview	
Iron Man	Crash		1988	one-shot; published under the Epic Comics imprint	
Iron Man	Director of S.H.I.E.L.D.	#29–35	Jul 2008 – Jan 2009	continued from The Invincible Iron Man vol. 1	
Iron Man	Director of S.H.I.E.L.D.	Annual #1	Jan 2008		
Iron Man	Enter the Mandarin	#1–6	Nov 2007 – Apr 2008	limited series	
Iron Man	Golden Avenger	#1	Nov 2008	one-shot	
Iron Man	Hong Kong Heroes	#1	May 2018	one-shot	
Iron Man	House of M	#1–3	Sep 2005 – Nov 2005	limited series	
Iron Man	Hypervelocity	#1–6	Mar 2007 – Aug 2007	limited series	
Iron Man	I Am Iron Man!	#1–2	Mar 2010 – Apr 2010	limited series	
Iron Man	Inevitable	#1–6	Feb 2006 – Jul 2006	limited series	
Iron Man	Iron Protocols	#1	Dec 2009	one-shot	
Iron Man	Kiss and Kill	#1	Aug 2010	one-shot	
Iron Man	Legacy	#1–11	Jun 2010 – Apr 2011		
Iron Man	Legacy of Doom	#1–4	Jun 2008 – Sep 2008	limited series	
Iron Man	Noir	#1–4	Jun 2010 – Sep 2010	limited series	
Iron Man	Racing Towards Doom	#1	Dec 2026	one-shot	
Iron Man	Rapture	#1–4	Jan 2011 – Feb 2011	limited series	
Iron Man	Requiem	#1	Jan 2010	one-shot	
Iron Man	The Coming of the Melter!	#1	Jul 2013	one-shot	
Iron Man	The End	#1	Jan 2009	one-shot	
Iron Man	The Iron Age	#1–2	Aug 1998 – Sep 1998	limited series	
Iron Man	The Legend	#1	Sep 1996	one-shot	
Iron Man	Titanium!	#1	Dec 2010	one-shot	
Iron Man	Viva Las Vegas	#1–2	Jul 2008 – Sep 2008	limited series	
Iron Man/	Captain America: Casualties of War	#1	Feb 2007	one-shot	
Iron Man/	Hulk/Fury	#1	Feb 2009	one-shot	
Iron Man/	Thor	#1–4	Jan 2011 – Apr 2011	limited series	
Iron Man/	X-O Manowar: In Heavy Metal	#1	Sep 1996	one-shot; co-published with Valiant Comics; based on the video game	
Iron Man 2	Agents of S.H.I.E.L.D.	#1	Nov 2010	one-shot	
Iron Man 2	Public Identity	#1–3	Jun 2010 – Aug 2010	limited series	
Iron Man 2	Spotlight	#1	Apr 2010	one-shot	
Iron Man 2.0		#1–12 7.1	Apr 2011 – Feb 2012		
Iron Man 2020	vol. 1	#1	Jun 1994	one-shot	
Iron Man 2020	vol. 2	#1–6	Mar 2020 – Oct 2020	limited series	
Iron Man and Power Pack		#1–4	Jan 2008 – Apr 2008	limited series	
Iron Man & Sub-Mariner		#1	Apr 1968	one-shot	
Iron Man By Design		#1	Nov 2010	one-shot	
Iron Man vs. Whiplash		#1–4	Jan 2010 – Apr 2010	limited series	
Iron Manual		#1	1993	one-shot	
Iron Manual	Mark 3	#1	Jun 2010	one-shot	
Iron Patriot		#1–5	May 2014 – Sep 2014		
Ironheart		#1–12	Jan 2019 – Jan 2020		
Ironheart	Bad Chemistry	#1	Jun 2025	one-shot	
The Irredeemable Ant-Man		#1–12	Dec 2006 – Nov 2007		
The Island of Dr. Moreau		#1	Oct 1977	adaptation of the 1977 film	
It's Jeff		#1	May 2023	one-shot	
It's Jeff	Brand New Week	#1	Aug 2026	one-shot	
It's Jeff	Infinity Paws	#1	Sep 2025	one-shot	
It's Jeff	Jeff Week	#1	Jul 2025	one-shot	
It's Jeff	Meets Daredevil	#1	Apr 2026	one-shot	
It's Jeff	The Jeff-Verse	#1	Jan 2024	one-shot	
It's Jeff & Other Marvel Tails		#1	Nov 2025	one-shot	
It's Symbie		#1	Sep 2026	one-shot	
IVX		#0–6	Jan 2017 – May 2017	limited series	

== J ==
Title	Series	Issues	Dates	Notes	Reference
J2		#1–12	Oct 1998 – Sep 1999		
The Jack of Hearts		#1–4	Jan 1984 – Apr 1984	limited series	
Jackpot		#1	Mar 2024	one-shot; Gang War tie-in	
Jackpot & Black Cat		#1–4	May 2024 – Aug 2024	limited series	
James Bond: For Your Eyes Only		#1–2	Oct 1981 – Nov 1981	limited series; adaptation of 1981 film	
James Bond Jr.		#1–12	Jan 1992 – Dec 1992	limited series	
Jane Foster & the Mighty Thor		#1–5	Aug 2022 – Dec 2022	limited series	
Jay & Silent Bob: Jays of Future Past		#1	Aug 2026	one-shot	
Jean Grey	vol. 1	#1–11	Jul 2017 – Mar 2018		
Jean Grey	vol. 2	#1–4	Oct 2023 – Jan 2024	limited series; Fall of X tie-in	
Jeff the Land Shark		#1–5	Aug 2025 – Dec 2025	limited series	
Jeff the Land Shark	Superstar	#1–5	Sep 2026 – Jan 2027	limited series	
Jessica Jones		#1–18	Dec 2016 – May 2018		
Jessica Jones	Blind Spot	#1–6	Mar 2020 – May 2020	limited series	
JLA/Avengers		#1, 3	Sep 2003; Nov 2003	limited series; issues 2 & 4 published by DC as Avengers/JLA	
Joe Fixit		#1–5	Mar 2023 – Jul 2023	limited series	
John Carter	A Princess of Mars	#1–5	Nov 2011 – Mar 2012	limited series; adaptation of novel	
John Carter	The Gods of Mars	#1–5	May 2012 – Sep 2012	limited series	
John Carter	The World of Mars	#1–4	Dec 2011 – Mar 2012	limited series	
John Carter	Warlord of Mars	#1–28	Jun 1977 – Oct 1979		
John Carter	Warlord of Mars	Annual #1–3	1977 – 1979		
John Romita Jr. 30th Anniversary Special			2006	one-shot	
Journey into Mystery	vol. 1	#69–125	Jun 1961 – Feb 1966	Previous issues published by Atlas Comics; continued as Thor vol. 1	
Journey into Mystery	vol. 1	Annual #1	1965		
Journey into Mystery	vol. 2	#1–19	Oct 1972 – Oct 1975		
Journey into Mystery	vol. 3	#503–521 -1	Nov 1996 – Jun 1998	continued from Thor vol. 1	
Journey into Mystery	vol. 4	#622–655 626.1	Jun 2011 – Oct 2013	continued from Thor vol. 3	
Journey into Mystery	The Birth of Krakoa	#1	Nov 2018	one-shot	
Journey into Unknown Worlds	vol. 3	#1	Mar 2019	one-shot: previous volumes published by Timely Comics and Atlas Comics	
Journey to Star Wars	The Force Awakens: Shattered Empire	#1–4	Nov 2015 – Dec 2015	limited series	
Journey to Star Wars	The Last Jedi: Captain Phasma	#1–4	Nov 2017 – Dec 2017	limited series	
Journey to Star Wars	The Rise of Skywalker: Allegiance	#1–4	Dec 2019	limited series	
Jubilee		#1–6	Nov 2004 – Apr 2005		
Jubilee	Deadly Reunion	#1	Jul 2026	one-shot	
Juggernaut	vol. 1	#1	Apr 1997	one-shot	
Juggernaut	vol. 2	#1	Nov 1999	one-shot	
Juggernaut	vol. 3	#1–5	Nov 2020 – Mar 2021	limited series	
Jungle Action	vol. 2	#1–24	Oct 1972 – Nov 1976	vol. 1 published by Atlas Comics	
Just Spectacular Collection		#1	Aug 2026	one-shot	
Justice	vol. 2	#1–32	Nov 1986 – Jun 1989	vol. 1 published by Timely Comics and Atlas Comics	
Justice	Four Balance	#1–4	Sep 1994 – Dec 1994	limited series	

== K ==
Title	Series	Issues	Dates	Notes	Reference
Kahhori: Reshaper of Worlds		#1	Jan 2025	one-shot	
Kanan		#7–12	Dec 2015 – May 2016	continued from Kanan the Last Padawan	
Kanan the Last Padawan		#1–6	Jun 2015 – Nov 2015	continued as Kanan	
Kang The Conqueror		#1–5	Oct 2021 – Feb 2022	limited series	
Karnak		#1–6	Dec 2015 – Apr 2017		
Kathy		#12–27	Oct 1961 – Feb 1964	previous issues published by Atlas Comics	
Ka-Zar	vol. 1	#1–3	Aug 1970 – Mar 1971		
Ka-Zar	vol. 2	#1–20	Jan 1974 – Feb 1977		
Ka-Zar	vol. 3	#1–20	May 1997 – Dec 1998		
Ka-Zar	vol. 3	'97	1997	Annual	
Ka-Zar	vol. 4	#1–5	Aug 2011 – Dec 2011	limited series	
Ka-Zar	Lord of the Savage Land	#1–5	Nov 2021 – Apr 2022	limited series	
Ka-Zar	Sibling Rivalry	#-1	Jul 1997	one-shot	
Ka-Zar of the Savage Land		#1	Feb 1997	one-shot	
Ka-Zar the Savage		#1–34	Apr 1981 – Oct 1984		
Kickers, Inc.		#1–12	Nov 1986 – Oct 1987		
Kid Colt	vol. 2	#1	Sep 2009	one-shot; vol. 1 published by Timely Comics	
Kid Colt, Outlaw		#99–229	Jul 1961 – Apr 1979	previous issues published by Atlas Comics	
Kid Colt, Outlaw		Giant-Size #1–3	Jan 1975 – Jul 1975		
Kid Juggernaut		#1	Jun 2025	one-shot	
Kid 'n Play		#1–9	Feb 1992 – Oct 1992		
Kid Venom		#1–4	Sep 2024 – Mar 2025	limited series	
Kid Venom	Origins	#1	Mar 2024	one-shot	
Kidpool/Spider-Boy		#1	Feb 2025	one-shot	
Killmonger		#1–5	Feb 2019 – Jun 2019	limited series	
Killpower: The Early Years		#1–4	Sep 1993 – Dec 1993	limited series	
Killraven	vol. 1	#1	Feb 2001	one-shot	
Killraven	vol. 2	#1–6	Dec 2002 – May 2003	limited series	
King Arthur and the Knights of Justice		#1–3	Dec 1993 – Feb 1994	limited series; based on the TV series	
King Conan	vol. 1	#1–19	Mar 1980 – Nov 1983	continued as Conan the King	
King Conan	vol. 2	#1–6	Feb 2022 – Sep 2022	limited series	
King in Black		#1–5	Feb 2021 – Jun 2021	limited series	
King in Black	Black Knight	#1	Apr 2021	one-shot	
King in Black	Black Panther	#1	Apr 2021	one-shot	
King in Black	Captain America	#1	May 2021	one-shot	
King in Black	Ghost Rider	#1	May 2021	one-shot	
King in Black	Gwenom vs. Carnage	#1–3	Mar 2021 – May 2021	limited series	
King in Black	Handbook	#1	May 2021	one-shot	
King in Black	Immortal Hulk	#1	Feb 2021	one-shot	
King in Black	Iron Man/Doom	#1	Feb 2021	one-shot	
King in Black	Marauders	#1	Apr 2021	one-shot	
King in Black	Namor	#1–5	Feb 2021 – Jun 2021	limited series	
King in Black	Planet of the Symbiotes	#1–3	Mar 2021 – Jun 2021	limited series	
King in Black	Return of the Valkyries	#1–4	Mar 2021 – May 2021	limited series	
King in Black	Scream	#1	May 2021	one-shot	
King in Black	Spider-Man	#1	May 2021	one-shot	
King in Black	Thunderbolts	#1–3	Mar 2021 – May 2021	limited series	
King in Black	Wiccan and Hulking	#1	May 2021	one-shot	
King-Size Conan		#1	Feb 2021	one-shot	
King-Size Spider-Man Summer Special		#1	Oct 2008	one-shot	
King Thor		#1–4	Nov 2019 – Feb 2020	limited series	
Kingpin	vol. 1	#1	Nov 1997	one-shot; also known as Spider-Man/Kingpin: To the Death	
Kingpin	vol. 2	#1–7	Aug 2003 – Feb 2004	limited series	
Kingpin	vol. 3	#1–5	Apr 2017 – Aug 2017		
Kitty Pryde, Agent of S.H.I.E.L.D.		#1–3	Dec 1997 – Feb 1998	limited series	
Kitty Pryde and Wolverine		#1–6	Nov 1984 – Apr 1985	limited series	
Klaws of the Panther		#1–4	Dec 2010 – Feb 2011	limited series	
Knights of Pendragon		#5–15	Nov 1992 – Sep 1993	continued from Pendragon	
Knights of X		#1–5	Jun 2022 – Oct 2022	limited series	
Knull		#1–5	Mar 2026 – Jul 2026	limited series	
Kookaburra K		#1–3	2009	limited series	
Korvac Saga		#1–4	Aug 2015 – Nov 2015	limited series; Secret Wars (2015) tie-in	
The Kree-Skrull War Starring the Avengers		#1–2	Sep 1983 – Oct 1983	limited series	
Krull		#1–2	Nov 1983 – Dec 1983	limited series; movie adaptation	
Kull the Conqueror	vol. 1	#1–10	Jun 1971 – Sep 1973	continued as Kull the Destroyer	
Kull the Conqueror	vol. 2	#1–2	Dec 1982 – Mar 1983	limited series	
Kull the Conqueror	vol. 3	#1–10	May 1983 – Jun 1985		
Kull the Destroyer		#11–29	Nov 1973 – Oct 1978	continued from Kull the Conqueror vol. 1	

== L ==
Title	Series	Issues	Dates	Notes	Reference
Labyrinth		#1–3	Nov 1986 – Jan 1987	limited series; movie adaptation	
Lady Deadpool		#1	Sep 2010	one-shot	
Laff-A-Lympics		#1–13	Mar 1978 – Mar 1979		
Lando		#1–5	Sep 2015 – Dec 2015	limited series	
The Last Annihilation	Wakanda	#1	Nov 2021	one-shot	
The Last Annihilation	Wiccan & Hulkling	#1	Nov 2021	one-shot	
The Last Avengers Story		#1–2	Nov 1995 – Dec 1995	limited series	
The Last Defenders		#1–6	May 2008 – Oct 2008	limited series	
The Last Fantastic Four Story		#1	Oct 2007	one-shot	
Last Hero Standing		#1–5	Aug 2005	limited series	
Last Planet Standing		#1–5	Jul 2006 – Sep 2006	limited series	
The Last Starfighter		#1–3	Oct 1984 – Dec 1984	limited series; movie adaptation	
The Last Wolverine		#1–3	Dec 2025 – Feb 2026	limited series; Age of Revelation tie-in	
Laura Kinney: Sabretooth		#1–3	Dec 2025 – Feb 2026	limited series; Age of Revelation tie-in	
Laura Kinney: Wolverine		#1–10	Feb 2025 – Nov 2025		
The Legend Of Shang-Chi		#1	Apr 2021	one-shot	
Legendary Star-Lord		#1–12	Sep 2014 – Jul 2015	limited series	
Legion		#1–5	Mar 2018 – Jul 2018	limited series	
Legion of Monsters	vol. 1	#1	Sep 1975	one-shot	
Legion of Monsters	vol. 2	#1–4	Dec 2011 – Mar 2012	limited series	
Legion of Monsters	Man-Thing	#1	May 2007	one-shot	
Legion of Monsters	Morbius	#1	Sep 2007	one-shot	
Legion of Monsters	Satana	#1	Aug 2007	one-shot	
Legion of Monsters	Werewolf by Night	#1	Apr 2007	one-shot	
The Legion of Night		#1–2	Oct 1991	limited series	
Legion of X		#1–10	Jul 2022 – Apr 2023		
The Lethal Foes of Spider-Man		#1–4	Sep 1993 – Mar 1994	limited series	
The Life of Captain Marvel	vol. 1	#1–5	Aug 1985 – Dec 1985	limited series	
The Life of Captain Marvel	vol. 2	#1–5	Sep 2018 – Feb 2019	limited series	
The Life of Christ	The Christmas Story	#1	Feb 1993	one-shot	
The Life of Christ	The Easter Story	#1	1994	one-shot	
The Life of Pope John Paul II		#1	Jan 1983	one-shot	
The Life of Wolverine		#1	Sep 2024	one-shot	
Life with Millie		#12–20	Aug 1961 – Dec 1962	previous issues published by Atlas Comics; continued as Modeling with Millie	
Li'l Kids		#1–12	Jul 1970 – Jun 1973		
Li'l Pals		#1–5	Sep 1972 – May 1973		
Linda Carter, Student Nurse		#1–9	Sep 1961 – Jan 1963		
Livewires		#1–6	Apr 2005 – Sep 2005	limited series	
Lockjaw		#1–4	Apr 2018 – Jul 2018	limited series	
Lockjaw & the Pet Avengers		#1–4	Jul 2009 – Oct 2009	limited series	
Lockjaw & the Pet Avengers	Unleashed	#1–4	May 2010 – Aug 2010	limited series	
Logan		#1–3	May 2008 – Jul 2008	limited series	
Logan	Black, White & Blood	#1–4	Mar 2026 – Jun 2026	limited series	
Logan	Path of the Warlord	#1	Feb 1996	one-shot	
Logan	Shadow Society	#1	Dec 1996	one-shot	
Logan's Run		#1–7	Jan 1977 – Jul 1977	movie adaptation	
Loki	vol. 1	#1–4	Sep 2004 – Nov 2004	limited series	
Loki	vol. 2	#1–4	Dec 2010 – May 2011	limited series	
Loki	vol. 3	#1–5	Sep 2019 – Jan 2020		
Loki	vol. 4	#1–4	Aug 2023 – Nov 2023	limited series	
Loki	Agent of Asgard	#1–17	Apr 2014 – Oct 2015		
The Loners		#1–6	Jun 2007 – Jan 2008	limited series	
Longshot	vol. 1	#1–6	Sep 1985 – Feb 1986	limited series	
Longshot	vol. 2	#1	Feb 1998	one-shot	
Longshot Saves the Marvel Universe		#1–4	Jan 2014 – Feb 2014	limited series	
Longshots		#1–3	Dec 2025 – Feb 2026	limited series; Age of Revelation tie-in	
Lords of Avalon	Knight of Darkness	#1–6	Jan 2009 – Jul 2009	limited series	
Lords of Avalon	Sword of Darkness	#1–6	Apr 2008 – Sep 2008	limited series	
Lords of Empyre	Celestial Messiah	#1	Oct 2020	one-shot	
Lords of Empyre	Emperor Hulkling	#1	Sep 2020	one-shot	
Lords of Empyre	Swordsman	#1	Oct 2020	one-shot	
Love Romances	vol. 1	#94–106	Jul 1961 – Jul 1964	previous issues published by Timely Comics and Atlas Comics	
Love Romances	vol. 2	#1	Apr 2019	one-shot	
Luke Cage	vol. 1	#1–5	Jul 2017 – Nov 2017		
Luke Cage	vol. 2	#166–170	Dec 2017 – Apr 2018	numbering continued from Hero for Hire	
Luke Cage Noir		#1–4	Oct 2009 – Jan 2010	limited series	
Luna Snow: World Tour		#1	Mar 2026	one-shot	
Lunatik		#1–3	Dec 1995 – Feb 1996	limited series	
