= Minotaur (comics) =

Comic book character

Minotaur is the name of several fictional characters appearing in American comic books published by Marvel Comics.

== Publication history ==
The Miklos Vryolak incarnation of Minotaur first appeared in Iron Man #24 (April 1970), and was created by writer Archie Goodwin and artist Johnny Craig.

The mythological Minotaur first appeared in Hercules: Heart of Chaos #2 (July 1997), and was adapted by writer Peter B. Gillis and artist Sal Buscema.

The Decimus Furius incarnation of Minotaur first appeared in Uncanny X-Force #1 (October 2010), and was created by writer Rick Remender and artist Jerome Opeña.

The Dario Agger incarnation of Minotaur first appeared in Thor: God of Thunder #19 (February 2014), and was created by writer Jason Aaron and artist Esad Ribić.

== Fictional character biography ==
=== Mythological Minotaur ===
Based on the Greek mythology creature of the same name, the Minotaur is the offspring of Queen Pasiphaë and the Bull of Poseidon, which her husband King Minos refused to sacrifice at Poseidon's orders. As a result of this union, the Minotaur was born. Upon learning of the Minotaur's origin, Minos enlists Daedalus to construct a labyrinth to have the Minotaur placed in so that it can never escape. For several years, Minos uses his labyrinth to imprison his prisoners so that the Minotaur can kill them. One day, Theseus offers himself as a prisoner to Minos. With the help of Minos' daughter Ariadne, Theseus makes his way through the labyrinth and kills the Minotaur with his sword.

The Minotaur's corpse is transported back to the labyrinth in Greece. Matsu'o Tsurayaba and the Hand are led to the Minotaur's corpse by Eurystheus and Achelous, who manage to resurrect the Minotaur. When Hercules and Wolverine arrive at Tsurayaba's apartment, they are greeted by a video of Tsurayaba, Eurystheus, and Achelous telling them about how they resurrected several mythological monsters. Just then, Hercules and Wolverine are attacked by the Minotaur and the Nemean Lion. The Minotaur and the Nemean Lion knock out Hercules before turning their attention to Wolverine. The Minotaur explains to Wolverine that his adamantium claws cannot pierce the Nemean Lion's hide. After Wolverine knocks out the Nemean Lion, Hercules regains consciousness and helps Wolverine defeat the Minotaur, who seemingly falls to his death.

The Minotaur survives the fall, but is turned to stone and transported back to Crete. When Deadpool comes to Crete to retrieve the sarcophagus containing Shiklah, the Minotaur breaks free from his petrified state and attacks Deadpool. The Minotaur successfully destroys the sarcophagus with Deadpool's help and Shiklah is awakened.

=== Species ===
When Ares allies with Enchantress and steals the Ebony Blade from Black Knight, they rally the Minotaurs, Centaurs, and Satyrs to attack Mount Olympus before being defeated by Hercules and the Avengers.

=== Myklos Vryolak ===
Minotaur

Publication information
- Publisher: Marvel Comics
- First appearance: Iron Man #24 (April 1970)
- Created by: Archie Goodwin; Johnny Craig

In-story information
- Alter ego: Myklos Vryolak
- Species: Human mutate
- Abilities: Superhuman strength and durability

Myklos Vryolak is a Greek man who suffered from an unknown, uncurable disease. His father Dr. Vryolak desperately uses a chemical he discovered in the ruins of the labyrinth which he used to treat his son. Miklos recovers quickly, but mutates into a Minotaur. Vryolak sends his son to steal money and other objects under the pretense of creating a cure. In reality, Vryolak intends to create an army of monsters. After encountering Madame Masque, Vryolak takes her mask and begins planning to transform her into a Minotaur. Word of Madame Masque's mask reaches S.H.I.E.L.D., which causes Iron Man and Jasper Sitwell to go after Madame Masque. Iron Man nearly exhausts the power of his armor fighting the Minotaur, but managed to recharge his armor while sitting seemingly unconscious in wreckage. When Iron Man arrives, the Minotaur battles him again, with their battle damaging part of the grotto. As the cavern begins to collapse, the Minotaur realizes his father's true plans and sees that it is wrong to make more Minotaurs like him. The Minotaur holds the ceiling up long enough for Iron Man, Sitwell, and Madame Masque to escape as the cave-in crushes him and his father.

=== Decimus Furius ===
Dark God Minotaur

Publication information
- Publisher: Marvel Comics
- First appearance: Uncanny X-Force #1 (December 2010)
- Created by: Rick Remender; Jerome Opena

In-story information
- Alter ego: Decimus Furius
- Species: Human mutant
- Team affiliations: Clan Akkaba; Horsemen of Apocalypse
- Abilities: Superhuman strength and durability Regeneration

Decimus Furius was born in Rome. After his father was forced to commit suicide for his philosophic ideas, his mother soon committed suicide as well, leaving Decimus homeless on the streets. In 281 A.D., upon starving to death, Decimus' mutant powers emerged turning him into a Minotaur-like form. He was consequently attacked and killed dozens of humans before being imprisoned. After years of imprisonment, he was sent to the Colosseum as a gladiator and battled every day for the next few years of his life for his survival and eventual freedom, and became worshiped as being the dark god Minotaur.

Decimus is watched by Apocalypse and selected to become the Horseman War, in the event that his other plans fail. Clan Akkaba eventually activates him to serve as a Horseman to a young clone of Apocalypse. During a raid on a Clan Akkaba stronghold, Fantomex defeats War by making him believe that he is love with Psylocke. He explodes, but is fully regenerated a few instants later.

Apocalypse recruits Minotaur to become War, one of his Horsemen. However, he falls in love with Psylocke, who cleanses his mind.

=== Dario Agger ===
Minotaur

Publication information
- Publisher: Marvel Comics
- First appearance: Thor: God of Thunder #19 (April 2014)
- Created by: Jason Aaron; Esad Ribić

In-story information
- Alter ego: Dario Agger
- Species: Human mutate
- Team affiliations: Roxxon Energy Corporation
- Abilities: Superhuman strength and durability Ability to change from human to Minotaur at will

Dario Agger is the CEO of Roxxon Energy Corporation. As a child, his family owned a small island in the Aegean Sea which was attacked by gunmen. Agger fled to a small cave in which he found a statue and prayed for revenge, unknowingly making a pact with an unknown dark god. He strives to make as much money as possible regardless of the effects on the environment and uses Roxxon's vast financial resources to avoid the consequences of his actions. One of his most frequent critics is S.H.I.E.L.D. environmental agent Rosalind Solomon. When Solomon learns that Agger and Roxxon have mined ice from Europa and are planning to sell it for profit, she decides to have Thor bring ice from Jotunheim and give it away for free. Agger brushes off Thor's interference at first. Thor decides to combat Roxxon directly, destroying several factories with lightning. Agger angrily asks his lawyers what they should do. When his lawyers do not give a satisfactory answer, Agger feeds them to bears.

While Thor is away helping the Avengers, Agger enacts revenge on him for destroying his factories by building a floating island full of factories above Broxton, Oklahoma, which heavily pollutes the town. When Thor arrives, Agger and his remaining lawyers file a lawsuit for destroying Roxxon's factories and with an injunction that forbade him from entering Broxton. Thor is undeterred and sneaks into Broxton, but is confronted by Agger, Ulik, and a group of trolls, with the trolls killing Agger's remaining lawyers. Agger reveals his identity as the Minotaur to Thor and explains that his ultimate goal is to exploit Earth's natural resources before moving on to a new area. The Trolls are defeated by the Asgardians and S.H.I.E.L.D., but Ulik flees and Broxton is left in ruins. Agger pleads ignorance to the incident.

In the storyline The War of the Realms, Minotaur and Roxxon take over Antarctica. During the fight at Roxxon's Antarctica HQ, Minotaur fights Jane Foster and Roz Solomon. When Agger's Minotaur identity is exposed, Roxxon's stocks end up in a free fall. However, Agger avoids prosecution by claiming that he was coerced into helping in Malekith's invasion.

In the series The Immortal Hulk, Minotaur allies with Xemnu, who attacks and deforms him after he objects to his plan to transform others into Xemnu hybrids. In The Immortal Thor, Dario Agger restores his body using a machine created by Roxxon scientist Dr. Lamarr, but retains a skull-like head and hoof-like hands in his Minotaur form.

== Powers and abilities ==
Each incarnation of the Minotaur possesses superhuman physical abilities of varying origin.

The Decimus Furius incarnation possesses an additional healing factor.

The Dario Agger incarnation can willingly change between his human and Minotaur forms.

== In other media ==
- Mythological Minotaurs appear in the Hulk and the Agents of S.M.A.S.H. episode "The Tale of Hercules" as servants of Pluto.
- A mythological Minotaur appears in Hulk: Where Monsters Dwell.
- Sanjar Javeed / War appears in the X-Men '97 episode "Days of Past Future".
