= Loki: Agent of Asgard =

Comic book series by Marvel Comics

- Textless cover of Loki: Agent of Asgard #8 (November 2014). Art by Lee Garbett.

Publication information
- Publisher: Marvel Comics
- Schedule: Monthly
- Format: Ongoing series
- Genre: Superhero
- Publication date: February 5, 2014 – August 19, 2015
- No. of issues: 17
- Main character(s): Loki; Verity Willis

Creative team
- Written by: Al Ewing
- Artist(s): Lee Garbett; Jenny Frison (cover artist)

Loki: Agent of Asgard is an American comic book published by Marvel Comics, based on the characters Loki and Verity Willis. The 17-issue limited series–written by Al Ewing, and illustrated by Lee Garbett–began publication on February 5, 2014, and concluded on August 19, 2015.

== Publication history ==
Loki: Agent of Asgard began publication on February 5, 2014, and concluded on August 19, 2015.

=== Issues ===
Issue	Publication date	Ref.
#1	February 5, 2014	
#2	March 5, 2014	
#3	April 2, 2014	
#4	May 7, 2014	
#5	June 4, 2014	
#6	September 24, 2014	
#7	October 15, 2014	
#8	November 19, 2014	
#9	December 24, 2014	
#10	January 21, 2015	
#11	February 18, 2015	
#12	March 18, 2015	
#13	April 15, 2015	
#14	May 20, 2015	
#15	June 24, 2015	
#16	July 22, 2015	
#17	August 19, 2015	

== See also ==
- List of Loki titles
