= John Romita Jr. =

American comic book artist (born 1956)

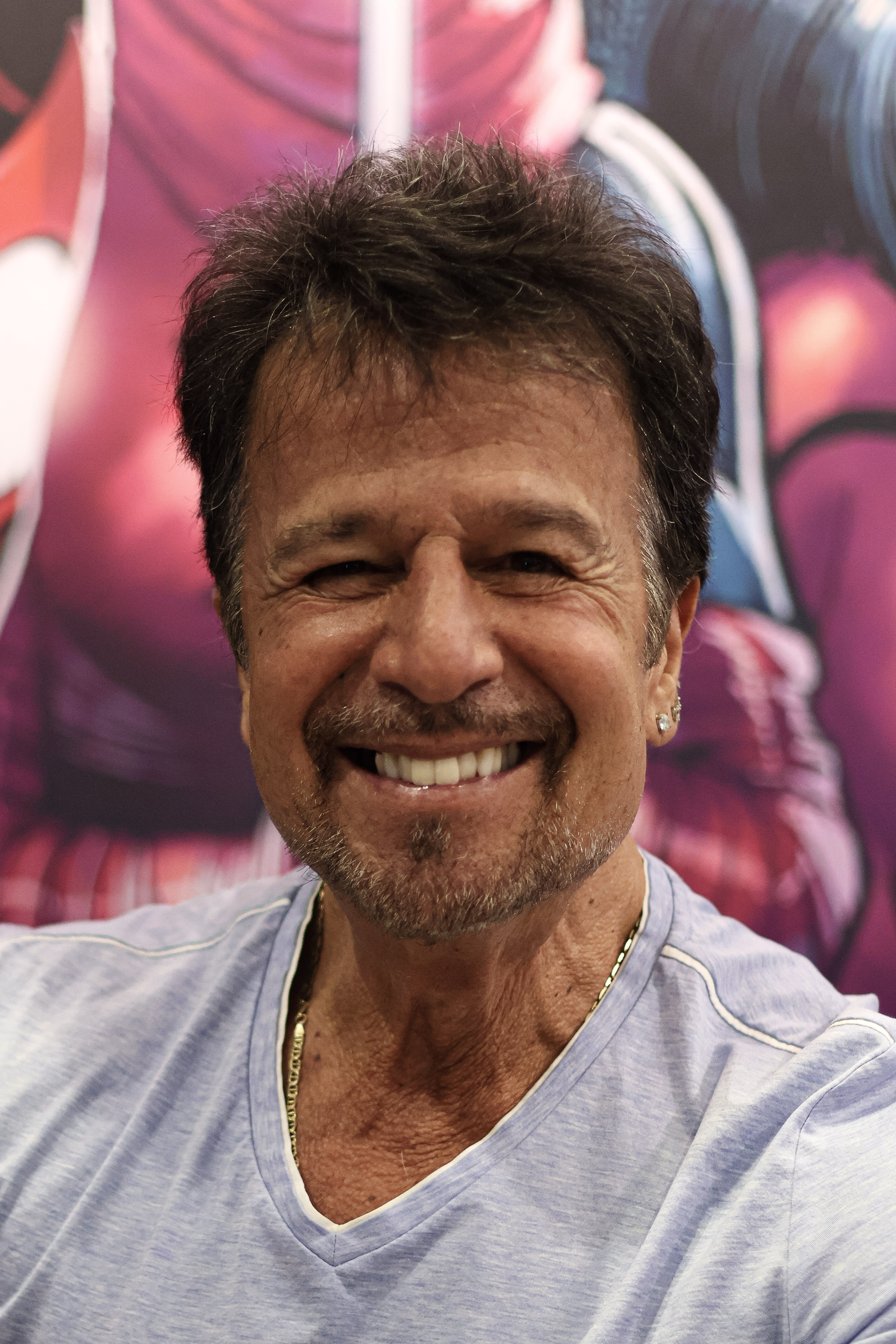
- Romita at Comic Con Cape Town in 2026
- Born: August 17, 1956 (age 70) New York City, U.S.
- Area: Penciller
- Pseudonym: JRJR
- Notable works: The Amazing Spider-Man; Daredevil; Iron Man; Kick-Ass; Superman; Uncanny X-Men
- Awards: Inkpot Award (1994); Eisner Award (2002)

John Salvatore Romita (/rəˈmiːtə/; born August 17, 1956) is an American comics artist best known for his extensive work for Marvel Comics from the 1970s to the 2020s. He is the son of artist John Romita Sr.

== Early life ==
John Romita Jr. was born August 17, 1956, the son of Virginia (Bruno) and comic book artist John Romita Sr.. He studied advertising art and design at Farmingdale State College in East Farmingdale, New York, graduating in 1976.

== Career ==
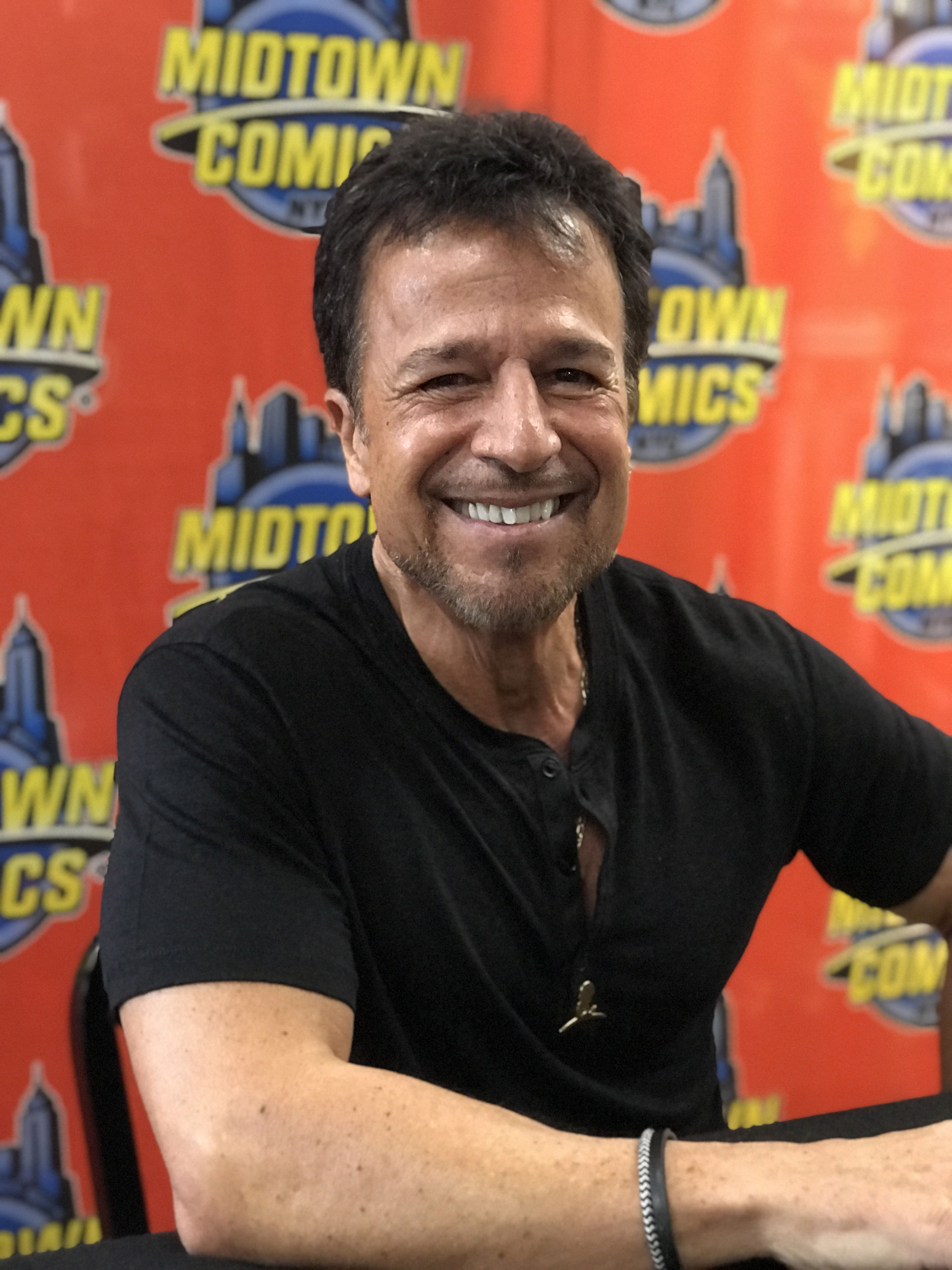
Romita signing in 2019

Romita Jr.'s first contribution to Marvel Comics was at the age of 13 with the creation of the original Prowler, a sketch of which Romita had produced. Editor Stan Lee liked the name but not the costume; Romita combined the name with a design that he had previously intended for a character called the Stalker that was intended for the never-published The Spectacular Spider-Man #3. Inspired by Romita's drawing, Lee, John Buscema and Jim Mooney created the Hobie Brown version of the character that would debut in The Amazing Spider-Man #78 (Nov. 1969).

Romita Jr. began his career at Marvel UK, doing sketches for covers of reprints. His American debut was a pin-up in Kid Colt, Outlaw #218 (June 1977) and two months later with a six-page story entitled "Chaos at the Coffee Bean!" in The Amazing Spider-Man Annual #11 (1977).

Romita's early popularity began with his run on Iron Man with writer David Michelinie and artist Bob Layton which began in 1978. The creative team introduced several supporting characters, including Tony Stark's bodyguard girlfriend Bethany Cabe and rival industrialist Justin Hammer. In the early 1980s, he had his first regular run on the series The Amazing Spider-Man and also was the artist for the launch of the Dazzler series. He and writer Dennis O'Neil introduced Madame Web in The Amazing Spider-Man #210 (Nov. 1980) and Hydro-Man in issue #212 (Jan. 1981). In 1982, Romita Jr. drew Marvel Super Hero Contest of Champions, the first limited series published by Marvel Comics. Working with writer Roger Stern on The Amazing Spider-Man, he co-created the character Hobgoblin. From 1983 to 1986 he had a run on the Uncanny X-Men with writer Chris Claremont and inker Dan Green, during which he co-created the character Forge. Romita has downplayed the significance of his run, saying that few of the characters introduced during this time were co-created by him and that his style has had no discernible influence on succeeding X-Men artists. His relationship with Claremont was rather cool at the time, as Claremont did not like his work as much as the artists he had previously worked with. He would return for a second run on Uncanny X-Men in 1993, which he said he liked better "because of getting to work with [writer] Scott Lobdell."

After he ended his first run on The Uncanny X-Men, Romita was assigned to Star Brand, one of the titles on Marvel's New Universe imprint, which featured a character the Romita was told would be Marvel's version of Superman. The title did not do well in sales, and Romita could not return to the X-Men. This experience, and personality conflicts that he had with those in editorial left Romita so disillusioned that he considered quitting the industry entirely. However, editor Ralph Macchio approached him one day as Romita was leaving the Marvel offices and asked him to consider working on Daredevil. Romita had never considered working on that character, despite the fact that his father had done so, but Macchio said he would be paired with writer Ann Nocenti, and that he would not only be allowed to do full pencils for the first time (having previously been restricted to doing only breakdowns), but would also collaborate on plots, and be allowed to choose his own inker. A skeptical Romita jokingly said he wanted Al Williamson, and was surprised when Williamson’s assignment to the book was confirmed a day later. For Romita himself, his stint on Daredevil was most significant for being both the first time he was allowed to do full pencils, and the first time he had a working relationship with the writer on a series. He later remarked that "I finally felt like I was part of the creation process for the first time while I was on DD." In a 2017 interview with SyFy Wire, Romita stated this run reinvigorated his enthusiasm for comics work, marking a turning point in his career. His run on the title from 1988 to 1990 included the creation of long-running Daredevil nemesis Typhoid Mary. After Daredevil #282, Romita left the series to pursue other projects, though his experience on Daredevil would influence his later return to the character with Frank Miller.

Promotional art for The Amazing Spider-Man vol. 2, #43 (April 2003), by John Romita Jr. and Scott Hanna

Stan Lee interviewed Romita and his father in Episode 8 of the 1991–1992 documentary series The Comic Book Greats.

He worked on a host of Marvel titles during the 1990s, including a return to Iron Man for the second "Armor Wars" story arc, written by John Byrne; The Punisher War Zone; the Cable miniseries; and the Punisher/Batman crossover. Klaus Janson was a frequent inker.

Romita contacted Frank Miller and told him that he wanted to collaborate on a graphic novel, suggesting they work on Wolverine. Miller dismissed this, saying that too many other creators were producing books featuring that character, and instead sent Romita a rejected 64-page film treatment for what was essentially a "Daredevil Year One"-type story. After Romita completed adapting the story into comics form, Miller told him that he had written an addendum to be set in between Pages 17 and 18, which ended up adding 84 more pages to the book, changing its format. The result was the 144-page, five-issue miniseries Daredevil: The Man Without Fear, which was published in 1993, The book was a retelling of the character's origin, which reunited Romita with Williamson on inks. In multiple interviews, Romita said that in terms of storytelling, he thought that Man Without Fear was the best work he had ever done, due to the strong storytelling and the quality of the story. Elements from the storyline were adapted into the 2015 Netflix series Daredevil.

In July 1998 Dan Jurgens and Romita Jr. relaunched the Thor series.

A January 1999 reboot of Peter Parker: Spider-Man was handled by Howard Mackie and Romita Jr.

In 2001, Romita returned to Spider-Man for a collaboration with writer J. Michael Straczynski beginning with The Amazing Spider-Man vol. 2 #30 (June 2001). The creative team produced a story for issue #36 (Dec. 2001) that served as memorial to the victims of the September 11 attacks. He drew Marvel's Wolverine with author Mark Millar. In 2004, Romita's creator-owned project The Gray Area was published by Image Comics. He subsequently worked on the Marvel series Black Panther, The Sentry and "Ultimate Vision", a backup feature in the Ultimate Marvel line, written by Mark Millar.

In 2006, Romita collaborated with writer Neil Gaiman on a seven-issue miniseries reinterpretation of Jack Kirby's characters the Eternals. Romita worked with Greg Pak on the five-issue central miniseries of Marvel's 2007 crossover storyline, "World War Hulk".

In 2008, Romita again returned to The Amazing Spider-Man. He also collaborated once more with Millar, for a creator-owned series, Kick-Ass, published by Marvel's Icon imprint. This was later adapted into the 2010 film Kick-Ass. Romita, one of the producers, directed an animated flashback sequence in the film.

Also in 2010 he relaunched the Avengers title with writer Brian Michael Bendis as part of Marvel's Heroic Age initiative.

On April 9, 2011, Romita was one of 62 comics creators who appeared at the IGN stage at the Kapow! convention in London to set two Guinness World Records, the "Fastest Production of a Comic Book" and "Most Contributors to a Comic Book". With Guinness officials on hand to monitor their progress, writer Millar began work at 9 a.m. scripting a 20-page black-and-white comic book of his character Superior, with Romita and the other artists appearing on stage throughout the day to work on the pencils, inks, and lettering, each drawing a panel. The book was completed in 11 hours, 19 minutes, and 38 seconds, and was published through Icon on November 23, 2011, with all royalties being donated to Yorkhill Children's Foundation.

On May 4, 2012, Romita set out to break his own record for continuous cartooning, to support the charity Candlelighters Childhood Cancer Foundation of Nevada. He attempted to continuously sketch characters and sign comics for 50 hours straight.

In 2014, Romita Jr. became the penciller of the DC Comics flagship title Superman, starting with issue #32, in collaboration with writer Geoff Johns. Romita Jr.'s Superman pencils have been inked by Klaus Janson. In 2016, Romita Jr. and writer Scott Snyder collaborated on the All-Star Batman series as part of the DC Rebirth relaunch. Romita Jr. and writer Dan Abnett created The Silencer series as part of DC's "Dark Metal" line. In addition, Romita worked with Frank Miller on the Superman: Year One mini-series.

Romita drew Kelly Sue DeConnick's story "Fore" for Detective Comics #1027 (November 2020).

In 2022 he once again returned to the Amazing Spider-Man title, this time with writer Zeb Wells.

=== Influences and techniques ===
Romita's art influences include his father, as well as comics artists Jack Kirby and John Buscema, the Wyeth family of painters, and illustrator Charles Dana Gibson.

Having illustrated both gritty street-level stories of characters such as Spider-Man and Daredevil and cosmic stories such as those starring Thor, Romita says he prefers the former, because "That is where I grew up. I use the same approach to each of the different story types – the story tells me what to do."

== Awards ==
John Romita Jr. received an Inkpot Award in 1994.

With writer J. Michael Straczynski and inker Scott Hanna, Romita Jr. won a 2002 Eisner Award for Best Serialized Story: The Amazing Spider-Man #30–35: "Coming Home".

== Bibliography ==
=== DC Comics ===
- Action Comics #1017–1028 (2019–2020)
- All-Star Batman #1–5 (2016)
- Batman vol. 3 #80–81 (2019)
- Batman Black and White vol. 5 #6 (among other artists, 2021)
- Dark Days: The Casting #1 (one-shot, with Jim Lee and Andy Kubert, 2017)
- Dark Days: The Forge #1 (one-shot, with Lee and Kubert, 2017)
- Dark Knight III: The Master Race #3 (backup story, 2016)
- Dark Knight Returns: The Last Crusade (one-shot, 2016)
- Detective Comics #1027 (among other artists, 2020)
- The Silencer #1–3 (2018)
- Suicide Squad vol. 4 #11–15 (2017)
- Superman vol. 3 #32–44 (2014–2015)
- Superman: Year One #1–3 (2019)

=== Image Comics ===
- The Gray Area #1–3 (2004)
- Kick-Ass #1–6 (2008)

=== Marvel Comics ===
- The Amazing Spider-Man #208, 210–218, 223–227, 229–236, 238–250, 290–291, 432, 500–508, 546, 568–573, 584–585, 587–588, 600, 692, Annual #11, 16 (1980–1984, 1987, 1995, 1998, 2003–2004, 2008–2009, 2012)
- The Amazing Spider-Man vol. 2, #22–27, 30–58 (2000–2003)
- The Amazing Spider-Man vol. 5, #73 (2021)
- The Amazing Spider-Man vol. 6, #1-5, 7–8, 11–13, 21–26, 31, 39–44, 49, 56-60 (2022–2024)
- The Amazing Spider-Man vol. 7, #1, 6-8, 11, 16, 18, 20-21 (2025-Present)
- The Avengers vol. 3 #35 (2000)
- The Avengers vol. 4 #1–12, 14, 16–17 (2010–2011)
- Black Panther vol. 3, #1–6 (2005)
- Cable: Blood and Metal #1-2 (miniseries, 1992)
- Captain America vol. 7, #1–10 (2013)
- Daredevil #250–257, 259–263, 265–276, 278–282, Annual #5 (1988–1990)
- Daredevil: The Man Without Fear #1-5 (1993–1994)
- Dark Reign: The List – Punisher #1 (2009)
- Dazzler #1–3 (1981)
- Eternals vol. 3 #1–7 (2006–2007)
- Fall of the Hulks: Gamma #1 (2010)
- Fallen Son: The Death of Captain America #4 (2007)
- Fantastic Four vol. 6 #35 (2021)
- Free Comic Book Day 2010: Iron Man/Thor #1 (2010)
- Free Comic Book Day 2022: Spider-Man/Venom #1 (2022)
- Free Comic Book Day 2025: Amazing Spider-Man/Ultimate Universe #1 (2025)
- Ghost Rider/Wolverine/Punisher: Hearts of Darkness #1 (1991)
- Heroes for Hope Starring the X-Men #1 (1985)
- The Incredible Hulk vol. 3 #24–25, 27–28, 34–39 (2001–2002)
- Iron Man #115–117, 119–121, 123–128, 141–150, 152–156, 256, 258–266 (1978–1982, 1990–1991)
- The Last Fantastic Four Story (2007)
- Marvel Super Hero Contest of Champions #1-3 (1982)
- Marvel Super Special #5 (Kiss) (1978)
- The Mighty Avengers #15 (2008)
- Peter Parker: Spider-Man #57, 64–76, 78–84, 86–92, 94–95, 97–98 (1995–1998)
- Peter Parker: Spider-Man vol. 2, #1–3, 6–12, 14–17, 19 (1999–2000)
- The Punisher War Zone #1–8 (1992)
- Scarlet Spider #2 (1995)
- Sentry vol. 2 #1–8 (miniseries, 2005–2006)
- The Spectacular Spider-Man #50, 121 (1981, 1986)
- Spider-Man: The Lost Years #0, 1–3 (miniseries, 1995)
- Star Brand #1–2, 4–7 (1986–1987)
- Thor vol. 2, #1–8, 10–13, 16–18, 21–25 (1998–2000)
- Ultimate Vision #0 (2007)
- Uncanny X-Men #175–185, 187–197, 199–200, 202–203, 206–211, 287, 300–302, 304, 306–311, Annual #4 (1980–1986, 1992–1994)
- Wolverine vol. 3, #20–31 (2004–2005)
- World War Hulk #1–5 (2007–2008)
- X-Men: Legacy #208 (2008)
- X-Men Unlimited #7 (1994)

==== Icon Comics ====
- Hit-Girl #1–5 (2012–2013)
- Kick-Ass #1–8 (with writer Mark Millar 2008–2010)
- Kick-Ass 2 #1–7 (2010–2012)
- Kick-Ass 3 #1–8 (2013–2014)

==== Marvel Comics / DC Comics ====
- Punisher/Batman: Deadly Knights (intercompany crossover, 1994)
- Thorion of the New Asgods #1 (1997)

Preceded by Keith Giffen	Iron Man artist 1978–1979	Succeeded by Jerry Bingham
Preceded by Bob Layton	Iron Man artist 1980–1982	Succeeded by Alan Kupperberg
Preceded by Keith Pollard	The Amazing Spider-Man artist 1980–1984	Succeeded by Ron Frenz
Preceded by Paul Smith	Uncanny X-Men artist 1983–1986	Succeeded by Marc Silvestri
Preceded by Rick Leonardi	Daredevil artist 1988–1990	Succeeded by Lee Weeks
Preceded by Herb Trimpe	Iron Man artist 1990–1991	Succeeded by Paul Ryan
Preceded by Brandon Peterson	Uncanny X-Men artist 1993–1994	Succeeded by Joe Madureira
Preceded by Gil Kane	Spider-Man artist 1996–1998	Succeeded by n/a
Preceded by John Byrne	The Amazing Spider-Man artist 2000–2004	Succeeded by Mike Deodato
Preceded by Darick Robertson	Wolverine artist 2004–2005	Succeeded by Kaare Andrews
Preceded by n/a	The Avengers vol. 4 artist 2010	Succeeded by Chris Bachalo
