= Resurrection of Magneto =

Marvel Comics limited series

- The cover to Resurrection of Magneto #1, art by Stefano Caselli, with colors by Jesus Aburtov.

Publication information
- Publisher: Marvel Comics
- Schedule: Monthly
- Format: Limited series
- Genre: Superhero
- Publication date: January – April 2024
- No. of issues: 4
- Main character(s): Storm; Magneto

Creative team
- Written by: Al Ewing
- Artist: Luciano Vecchio
- Letterer: Joe Sabino
- Colorist: David Curiel
- Editor(s): Lauren Amaro; Jordan D. White

Collected editions
- Resurrection of Magneto: ISBN 9781302957025

Resurrection of Magneto is a four-issue comic book limited series written by Al Ewing and drawn by Luciano Vecchio, published by Marvel Comics in 2024 and starring Storm and Magneto. It was part of the Fall of X storyline during the Krakoan Age of the X-Men.

== Publication history ==
During the 2022 crossover A.X.E.: Judgment Day, Magneto had been killed in battle by the Eternal Uranos. Without a Cerebro backup, there was no way to use the Resurrection Protocols to bring him back. In September 2023, Marvel revealed a glimpse of what they would be discussing during their "Marvel: Next Big Thing" panel during New York Comic-Con, which included Fall of the House of X, Rise of the Powers of X, and Resurrection of Magneto. During their "Marvel: Next Big Thing" panel, Al Ewing talked about the book, which would come out in January 2024: "When we killed Magneto, there was a plan. This isn't going to be a golden egg, easy path to resurrection. This is the hard road."

In January, Ewing gave an interview to Comic Book Resources where he talked more about the book:

The decision to kill Magneto came hand in hand with the decision to bring him back, and I knew his resurrection was going to come in the form of a quest undertaken by Storm at roughly the end of my time with her, assuming I got more than a year to tell the story. And we've pretty much stuck with that, though a couple of the fine details have evolved as we've told other stories in the meantime. But his death was always going to be the first act of the story.

== Plot synopsis ==
=== Issue 1: "The Lightning Path" ===
On Arakko, Storm has a nightmare about Magneto in pain. She is comforted by Craig Marshall, but knows that she needs to help Magneto, even in the afterlife. She visits Blue Marvel in his underwater base and, after explaining what she needs, he shows her a possible gateway to the afterlife. Heedlessly, she jumps in and finds herself at the Well Beyonds the Worlds and is confronted by Tarn the Uncaring, who had been killed earlier by Magneto. (Note: As seen in X-Men Red vol. 2 #3, written by Al Ewing, with art by Stefano Caselli.) After defeating Tarn, Storm's ancestor Ashake appears and tells her that in order to find Magneto, she needs to ascend the Tower. After ascending and falling from the Tower, in liminal Overspace, she is found by a group of Dominions, godlike beings of artificial intelligence who exist outside of time and space. (Note: As they appear in House of X and Powers of X by Jonathan Hickman.) They explain that Magneto also passed this way, warn her about Enigma, a Dominion made of human intelligence, (Note: Specifically that of the original Nathaniel Essex, as detailed in Immortal X-Men by Kieron Gillen.) and then attempt to absorb her, but she hits one with a lightning bolt and escapes. Finally, she falls until she finds herself in a broken city next to a river of lava. Magneto is already there, his eyes bleeding.

=== Issue 2: "The Weight of the World" ===
In a flashback to Giant-Size X-Men: Magneto, a sea witch hands Magneto his prize: a mysterious key, which she says is the key "to the door of judgment and purification," although she does not answer when he asks whether the door leads in or out. In the present day, despite being dead, Magneto still feels the weight of the key with him. In a place of judgment now, he reads the names written on the wall, all of the names of people killed "by my hand or in my name. By action or inaction. By intent or by accident." When Storm shows up, he tells her that every name must be counted and then tells her to leave. While she is trying to convince him to come back to life with her, Storm explains about the recent massacre at the Hellfire Gala (Note: A seen in X-Men: Hellfire Gala 2023 #1, written by Gerry Duggan.) and what happened with Professor X. Magneto, enraged, attacks Storm with the names on the wall until he comes across his own name, Max Eisenhardt. Storm finally shows him that the wall has rebuilt itself, with all the names of the people he has saved. Convinced, he takes the key and turns it. Both Storm and Magneto fall into darkness, into shadow, where they are confronted by the Shadow King.

=== Issue 3: "Falls the Shadow" ===
Alone in darkness, Storm is confronted by the giant golden mask of Annihilation. (Note: Annihilation was last seen in X-Men Red vol 2 #18, written by Al Ewing, art by Yıldıray Çınar.) Storm isn't convinced and asks instead if it is really the Shadow King. The Shadow King shows its face, but also that it has many faces, including la Bete Noir, (Note: Bete Noir was from the Gambit & Bishop: Sons of the Atom mini-series by Scott Lobdell and Joe Pruitt.) Adversary, (Note: Adversary first appeared in Uncanny X-Men #188, written by Chris Claremont with art by John Romita Jr.) the First Fallen, (Note: The First Fallen first appeared in Uncanny X-Men #473, written by Chris Claremont and Tony Bedard, with art by Roger Cruz.) and the Goblin Force. (Note: The Goblin Force was from the Mutant X series, written by Howard Mackie.) As Storm fights them, Magneto confronts the Shadow King in the guise of Professor X and then his own younger self. Magneto talks to his younger self and accepts the darkness within him, while Storm realizes that the Shadow King wants them to be alone, but they aren't. She reaches out and takes Magneto's hand and together they banish the Shadow King, but this leaves Storm on the brink of death. Magneto doesn't accept this and uses his own power to charge Storm's heart, which brings her back to life back in Blue Marvel's base. Magneto then walks through the portal into the base himself rejuvenated.

=== Issue 4: "Reawakening" ===
As Magneto, Storm, and Blue Marvel assault an Orchis ship, Magneto contemplates which version of himself he will be. He tries hard not to kill any of the Orchis guards. When he is confronted with a group of guards that have a special weapon against him which will trigger a poison gas that will kill a roomful of mutants if he attempts to use his powers, he realizes that he has no choice and uses his magnetic abilities to crush the guards' suits so quickly the gas cannot be activated, but leaving the guards dead. Leaving the ship, Magneto, Storm, and Blue Marvel see a Stark Sentinel attacking a ship full of human supporters and combine their powers in order to defeat it. Storm then receives a telepathic signal from Emma Frost asking for Magneto to help her husband Tony Stark. (Note: This leads into Magneto's appearance in Invincible Iron Man vol. 5 #17-18, written by Gerry Duggan, with art by Patrick Zircher and Creees Lee.) Together, they leave with Magneto saying "To save one life is to save the world." (Note: This was a paraphrased quote from the Talmud: "Whoever saves a single life saves the world entire.")

== Reception ==
AiPT gave the first issue a 9.5 out of 10 and wrote that it "blends sci-fi and the spiritual in a work like a 21st-century version of Siddhartha." Comic Watch gave it a 9 out of 10 and wrote: "Al Ewing's writing jumps off the page as much as the art, with an almost poetic thoughts coursing through Storm. The story is visually stunning, one of the most artistic issues of recent memory, with great design, color, and as mentioned earlier, textures, that give off the feeling of what the place not just looks, but what it is made from." Multiversity Comics gave it an 8.8 out of 10, commenting "[a]mid the chaos and terror of the mutants dying off and the Biblical level of power on display here, this is a surprisingly personal and private tale of a mutant trying to save her friend." ComicsXF wrote that "[t]his is the best Storm-centered story in ages, and maybe the best character work of the entire Krakoan era."

AiPT gave the second issue a 10 out of 10, writing that it "shows that this series is not just an all-timer Storm story but for the Master of Magnetism as well." Comic Watch gave it an 8.8 out of 10, noting that "Ewing and Vecchio continue to push Magneto to his literal limits, making for a strong, compelling and artisitically beautiful second issue that is just as strong as the first." AiPT also gave the third issue a 10 out of 10, writing that "this issue is bursting at the seams with perfection." Comic Watch again gave it an 8.8 out of 10. "Dynamic, intriguing, and wonderfully drawn and written, this is a comic you cannot skip." AiPT gave the fourth issue a 10 out of 10 as well. "Rich storytelling is matched with artists at the top of their game to answer the question of who the Master of Magnetism has become in his return to the land of the living." Nerd Initiative gave it an 8 out of 10, noting "[t]he art team delves into multiple full page images fitting for a legend's grand homecoming." Comic Watch gave it a 7.6 out of 10, writing that "[t]he action flows well and the art and panels help keep it moving. The stress the characters are under when faced against their foe in this issue is well illustrated." ComicsXF notes that it's "a great looking comic, with every brushstroke adding emphasis to every written word."

Journalist Asher Elbein wrote an article for Defector entitled "The Judgment of Magneto," exploring the history of Magneto from his origins up until Resurrection of Magneto #4 and how entwined it was with Israel:

In [Resurrection of Magneto], Marvel's master of magnetism, who is also the company's most famous Jewish character, counts his many sins, tortured by the fear that he's wasted his life on a poisoned dream. The comic arrives at a fraught time. When it debuted earlier this year, Israeli bombs had been falling on Gaza for three months; 25,000 people were dead. That number has now topped 34,000, and the bombs are still falling. It is a low and shameful moment. It is also one that suits Magneto entirely too well--a distillation of all the ambiguities and anxieties of American Judaism as it reckons with the sacrifices made to the promise of "never again," and the increasingly fraught question of what that actually means.

The book was listed as one of the "Best Comics of 2024 (So Far)" by ComicBook.com. "It is a true rebirth, offering a look at Magneto's entire history without shying away from its ties to horrific real-world events or the character's fictional history of terrible deeds often done with noble intentions."
