= Al Ewing =

British comics writer (born 1977)

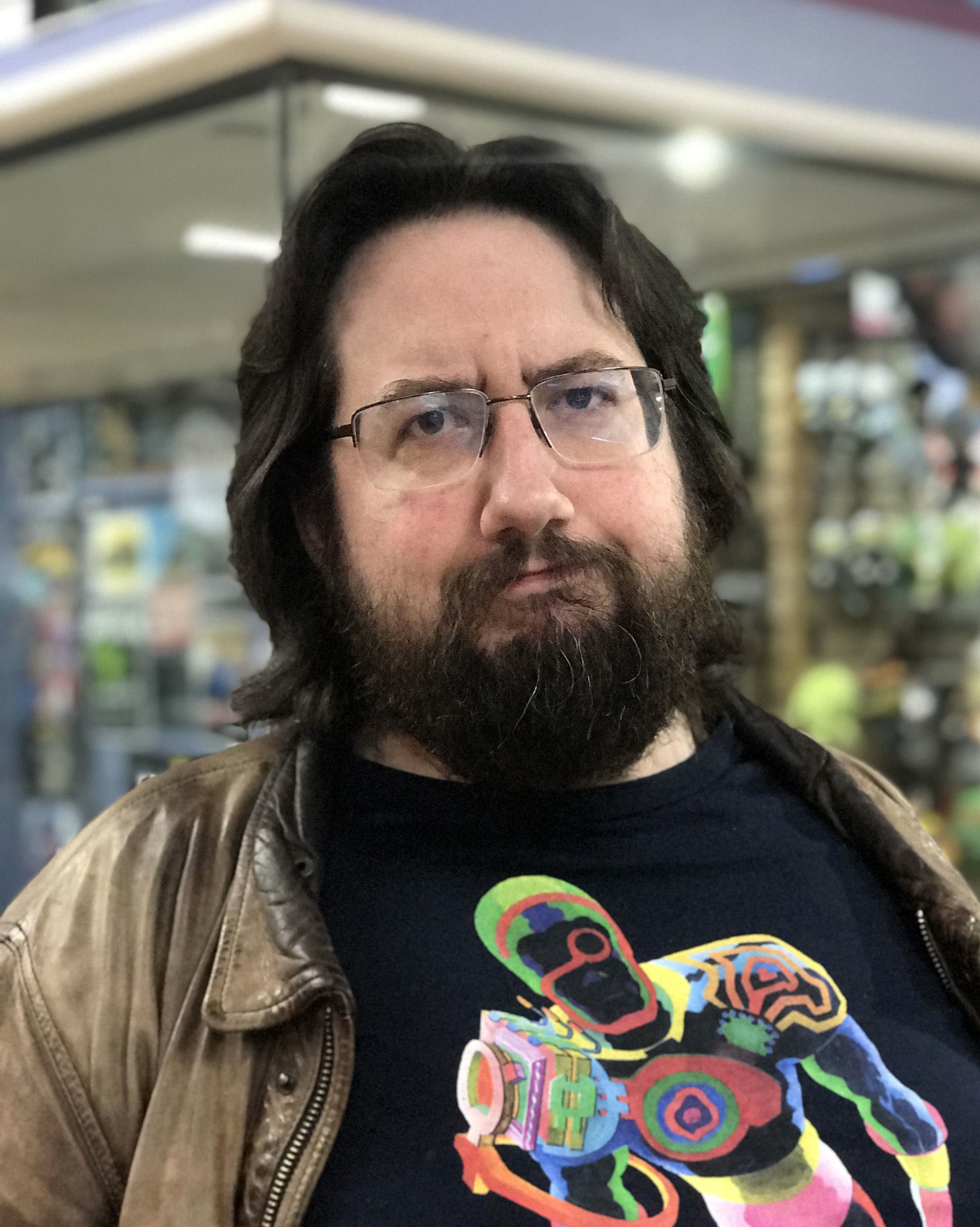
- Ewing at a book signing at Midtown Comics in Manhattan
- Born: 12 August 1977 (age 49) United Kingdom
- Area: Writer
- Notable works: El Sombra Trilogy; Loki: Agent of Asgard; Ultimates; The Immortal Hulk; We Only Find Them When They're Dead; The Immortal Thor; Absolute Green Lantern

Al Ewing (/ˈjuːɪŋ/ YOO-ing; born 12 August 1977) is a British comics writer who has mainly worked in the small press, for 2000 AD, and for Marvel Comics.

== Career ==
Al Ewing began his career writing stories in the four-page Future Shocks format for 2000 AD and moved on to regular stints on Judge Dredd (2008–2015), for which his 2010 story "Doctor What?" marked Brendan McCarthy's return to 2000 AD. They later worked together on a new series entitled The Zaucer of Zilk. Ewing worked on Damnation Station and Zombo, the latter illustrated by Henry Flint, which was collected in trade paperback in 2010.

Ewing has also contributed to Solar Wind, FutureQuake, and The End Is Nigh. He created the mobile comic Murderdrome with P. J. Holden.

In May 2007, Ewing created the comedy blog "The Diary of Ralph Dibny", writing as the titular DC Comics superhero (also known as Elongated Man), Dibny's therapist, or as the even more obscure DC hero Richard Dragon, as they react to the events of each week's issue of the comic book 52.

Breaking into American comic books, Ewing was also picked by Garth Ennis to provide a six-issue arc on Jennifer Blood, published by Dynamite Entertainment, and a spin-off series The Ninjettes.

His debut prose novel Pax Britannia: El Sombra, published by Abaddon Books in 2007, features a mysterious Mexican hero fighting back against the menace of steam-powered Nazis. It is set in the same steampunk alternate history as the other novels from the Pax Britannia series. Three other novels have been published since, with a fifth on the way.

Ewing wrote Mighty Avengers and Loki: Agent of Asgard for Marvel Comics and co-wrote the first year of the Eleventh Doctor Doctor Who title with Rob Williams for Titan Comics.

Ewing has since written New Avengers, U.S.Avengers, Ultimates, Rocket, Royals, and The Immortal Hulk, all for Marvel. The Immortal Hulk was a nominee for the 2019 Eisner Award in the "Best Continuing Series" category, and had earned publisher Marvel Comics a Diamond Gem Award the previous year as "Best New Comic Book Series."

In 2021, Ewing won the GLAAD Media Award for Outstanding Comic Book at the 32nd GLAAD Media Awards for his work on Empyre and received an additional nomination in 2021 and one in 2022 for Guardians of the Galaxy. In June 2021, it was announced that Ewing would serve as co-writer of Venom alongside Ram V, with Bryan Hitch serving as the initial artist and the series launching in November that same year.

During Marvel's Krakoan Age, Ewing was the writer on several X-Men titles such as the ongoing series S.W.O.R.D. (2020–2021), the flagship series X-Men Red (2022–2023) and the limited series Resurrection of Magneto (2024). In May 2023, it was announced that Ewing would write The Immortal Thor, with Martín Cóccolo serving as artist and debuting in August that same year.

In July 2024, it was announced at San Diego Comic-Con that Ewing would contribute to the Absolute Universe at DC Comics by penning the series Absolute Green Lantern, with Jahnoy Lindsay serving as artist and set for release in 2025. In August 2024, it was announced that Ewing would be working together with artist Carlos Gomez for the series All-New Venom (then relaunched as Venom Vol. 6. The series follows Mary Jane Watson as she becomes the new host of Venom in the aftermath of the Venom War beginning publication in December 2024 and still ongoing as of July 2026. In September 2024, it was announced that Ewing would pen the ongoing series Metamorpho: The Element Man with Steve Lieber illustrating and set to debut in December that same year.

== Personal life ==
Ewing has a brother, Tom Ewing, who writes critical essays on music and pop culture. He created the website Freaky Trigger, to which Al was an occasional contributor in its early days.

At the end of Pride Month 2021, Ewing publicly revealed he was bisexual.

== Bibliography ==
=== Prose ===
- Novels
  - The El Sombra Trilogy
    - El Sombra (2007)
    - Gods of Manhattan (2010)
    - Pax Omega (2012)
  - I, Zombie (2008)
  - Death Got No Mercy (2009)
  - The Fictional Man (2013)
- Novellas / short stories
  - "The Roses That Bloom Underground" (2010) [Short story from The End of the Line: An Anthology of Underground Horror]
  - Judge Dredd Year One: Wear Iron (2014)
  - "YOU ARE THE SHARK" (2015) [Short story from Sharkpunk anthology; co-written with Sarah Peploe]
  - 3 Worlds / 3 Moons
    - [SYSTEMS] Deluxe Hardcover (2022) ["RELIGION" system designer]
    - "Havo's Wager" (2023)

=== Rebellion Publishing ===
- 2000 AD
  - 2000 AD #1296, 1386, 1399, 1445, 1449, 1481, 1496-1499, 1508, 1532–1533, 1581–1587, 1610–1612, 1627, 1632–1639, 1644–1648, 1675–1684, 1686–1687, 1689–1692, 1699, 1705, 1712–1713, 1718–1725, 1728–1729, 1740–1749, 1775–1784, 1790–1791, 1803, 1806–1812, 1825–1834, 1850–1861 (2002–2013)
  - 2000 AD Winter Special #8 (2005) ["Bones of Eden", "Contagion"]
  - 2000 AD Christmas Annual #2010–2012 (2010–2012)
  - 2000 AD Free Comic Book Day #2011–2013 (2011–2013)
  - 2000 AD 40th Anniversary Special #1 (2017) ["Z.O.M.B.O."]
  - Best of 2000 AD #0 (2020) ["Democracy Soon!"]
  - 2000 AD Sci-Fi Special #2020, 2024–2025 (2020–2025) ["The Immigrant", "The Harlem Zombos"]
  - 2000 AD Presents All-Star Judge Dredd (2021) ["The Lawyer"]
  - Best of 2000 AD (2022) ["Hard Talk"]
- Judge Dredd Megazine #251-252, 265-271, 275, 278, 280-281, 283, 291-297, 302-303, 305, 312-313, 318, 355-360 (2006–2015)

=== Marvel Comics ===
- Ant-Man and the Wasp
  - Ant-Man #1–4 (2022)
  - Wasp #1–4 (2023)
- Avengers
  - Avengers Assemble #14.AU-15.AU, 20 (2013)
  - Mighty Avengers
    - Mighty Avengers (Vol. 2) #1–14 (2013–2014)
    - Captain America and the Mighty Avengers #1–9 (2015)
    - Captain Britain and the Mighty Defenders #1–2 (2015)
  - Avengers (Vol. 5) #34.1 (2014)
  - Avengers: Ultron Forever
    - Avengers: Ultron Forever #1 (2015)
    - New Avengers: Ultron Forever #1 (2015)
    - Uncanny Avengers: Ultron Forever #1 (2015)
  - Avengers (Vol. 6) #0 (2016) ["Everything Is New" and "The Opposite of Kicking"]
  - Ultimates
    - Ultimates (Vol. 2) #1–12 (2016)
    - Ultimates 2 (Vol. 2) #1–9, 100 (2017)
  - New Avengers
    - New Avengers (Vol. 4) #1–18 (2015–2017)
    - U.S.Avengers #1–12 (2017–2018)
  - Avengers (Vol. 1) #675-690 (2018) [Co-written with Mark Waid and Jim Zub]
  - Avengers: No Road Home #1–10 (2019) [Co-written with Mark Waid and Jim Zub]
  - Avengers Inc. #1–5 (2023–2024)
- Black, White & Blood
  - Elektra: Black, White & Blood #2 (2022) ["Verité"]
  - Marvel: Black, White & Blood and Guts #1 (2025)
- Contest of Champions
  - All-New, All-Different Point One #1 (2015) ["Chess Not Checkers"]
  - Contest of Champions #1–10 (2015–2016)
- Crypt of Shadows
  - Crypt of Shadows (Vol. 2) #1 (2019)
  - Crypt of Shadows (Vol. 3) #1 (2022) ["The Crypt of Shadows"]
  - Crypt of Shadows (Vol. 4) #1 (2023) ["Out of the Shadows"]
- Defenders
  - Defenders: The Best Defense #1 (2019)
  - Defenders (Vol. 6) #1–5 (2021)
  - Defenders: Beyond #1–5 (2022)
- Empyre
  - Incoming! #1 (2020) [Empyre setup pages; Hulk pages]
  - Empyre #0: Avengers (2020)
  - Empyre #1–6 (2020) [Co-plotted by Dan Slott]
  - Empyre Aftermath: Avengers #1 (2020)
- Guardians of the Galaxy
  - Rocket #1–6 (2017)
  - Guardians of the Galaxy Annual (Vol. 5) #1 (2019) ["A Long Time in Politics"]
  - Guardians of the Galaxy (Vol. 6) #1–18 (2020–2021)
  - Guardians of the Galaxy Annual (Vol. 6) #1 (2021) ["Oh No! It's the Prince of Power!"]
- Hulk
  - Immortal Hulk #1–50 (2018–2021)
  - Immortal Hulk: The Best Defense #1 (2019)
  - Absolute Carnage: Immortal Hulk #1 (2019)
  - Immortal She-Hulk #1 (2020)
  - King in Black: Immortal Hulk #1 (2021)
  - Gamma Flight #1–5 (2021) [Co-written with Crystal Frasier]
  - Immortal Hulk: Time of Monsters #1 (2021) [Co-plot, script by Alex Paknadel]
- Infinity Warps
  - Infinity Wars: Iron Hammer #1–2 (2018)
  - Secret Warps: Soldier Supreme Annual #1 (2019)
  - Secret Warps: Weapon Hex Annual #1 (2019)
  - Secret Warps: Ghost Panther Annual #1 (2019)
  - Secret Warps: Arachknight Annual #1 (2019)
  - Secret Warps: Iron Hammer Annual #1 (2019)
- Inhumans
  - Civil War II: Ulysses Infinite Comic #1–6 (2016)
  - Inhumans Prime #1 (2017)
  - Royals #1–12 (2017–2018)
  - Inhumans: Judgment Day #1 (2018)
- Iron Man: Fatal Frontier Infinite Comic #1–13 (2013–2014) [Co-plotted by Kieron Gillen; issues #1–2 & 10 co-written with Gillen]
- Marvel Comics #1000-1001 (2019) [Issue #1000 architect; Defenders setup pages]
- Marvel/DC: Deadpool/Batman #1 (2025) ["Rocket Has a Green Lantern Ring Now"]
- Marvel United: A Pride Special #1 (2025) ["Who We Are"]
- S.H.I.E.L.D.
  - Original Sins #5 (2014) ["How the World Works"]
  - S.H.I.E.L.D. #9 (2015) ["Dugan Lives!"]
  - Fury #1 (2023)
- Secret Wars Too #1 (2015) ["Great Incomprehensibility"]
- Spider-Man
  - Amazing Spider-Man: Full Circle #1 (2019) [Co-written with Jonathan Hickman, Nick Spencer, Gerry Duggan, Kelly Thompson, and Chip Zdarsky]
  - Spider-Man: Black Suit & Blood #3 (2024) ["Whatever Happened to Master Blood?"]
  - Giant-Size Amazing Spider-Man #1 (2025) ["616 Day"]
- Strange Tales
  - Strange Tales: Clea, Wong & America Infinity Comic #1 (2022)
  - Strange Tales: Victor Strange Infinity Comic #1 (2022)
  - Strange Tales: Rocket Raccoon Infinity Comic #1 (2022)
- Thanos Annual #1 (2018) ["The Comfort of the Good"]
- Thor
  - All-New Marvel NOW! Point One #1.NOW (2014) ["Before the Truth Has Its Pants On"]
  - Loki: Agent of Asgard #1–17 (2014–2015)
  - Original Sin #5.1–5.5 (2014) [Co-plotted by Jason Aaron]
  - War of the Realms Omega #1 (2019) ["The Job I Have to Do," co-written with Jason Aaron]
  - Valkyrie: Jane Foster #1–7 (2019–2020) [Co-written with Jason Aaron]
  - Thor (Vol. 6) #24 (2022) ["What Comes Next"]
  - Thor (Vol. 6) #27–28 (2022) [Co-plotted by Donny Cates]
  - Thor Annual (Vol. 6) #1 (2023) ["Would You Know More?"]
  - Immortal Thor #1–25 (2023–2025)
  - Roxxon Presents: Thor #1 (2024)
  - Immortal Thor Annual #1 (2024) ["The Idiot Abroad"]
  - Giant-Size Thor #1 (2024) ["In Medias Res"]
  - The Mortal Thor #1–13 (2025–2026)
  - Thor (Vol. 7) #800–present (2026–present)
- Venom
  - Carnage: Black, White & Blood #1 (2021) ["You Are Carnage"]
  - Free Comic Book Day 2021: Spider-Man/Venom #1 (2021) ["Like Father, Like Son," co-written with Ram V]
  - Venom (Vol. 5) #1, 5, 8–10, 13–14, 16–22, 24–25, 29–30, 32–35 (2021–2024) [Issue #1 co-written with Ram V]
  - Free Comic Book Day 2022: Spider-Man/Venom #1 (2022) ["Seven Seals," co-written with Ram V]
  - Free Comic Book Day 2023: Spider-Man/Venom #1 (2023) ["January, 1940"]
  - Extreme Venomverse #2 (2023) ["The Sinister Secret of Black Cat's New Costume"]
  - Free Comic Book Day 2024: Ultimate Universe/Spider-Man #1 (2024) ["Venom"]
  - Venomverse Reborn #1–4 (2024) ["Five Questions," Parts 1–4]
  - Venom War #1–5 (2024)
  - All-New Venom #1–10 (2024–2025)
  - Free Comic Book Day 2025: Amazing Spider-Man/Ultimate Universe #1 (2025) ["Untitled," co-written with Joe Kelly and Charles Soule]
  - Venom: Black, White & Blood #4 (2025)
  - Venom (Vol. 6) #250-262 (2025-2026)
  - Knull #1–5 (2026) [co-written with Tom Waltz]
  - Queen in Black #1-5 (2026)
- X-Men
  - Merry X-Men Holiday Special #1 (2019) ["Home for the Holidays"]
  - S.W.O.R.D. (Vol. 2) #1–11 (2020–2021)
  - Cable: Reloaded #1 (2021)
  - X-Men Red #1–18 (2022-2023)
  - Storm and the Brotherhood of Mutants #1–3 (2023)
  - X-Men: Before the Fall - Heralds of Apocalypse #1 (2023)
  - Marvel's Voices: X-Men #1 (2023) ["The Man with No Shame"]
  - Resurrection of Magneto #1–4 (2024)
  - X-Men #35 (2024) ["Dream's End," co-written with Kieron Gillen and Gerry Duggan]
  - Giant-Size X-Men #1 (2025) ["Revelation: Superior"]
  - World of Revelation #1 (2025)
- You Are Deadpool #1–5 (2018)

=== DC Comics ===
- Ghosts #1 (2012) ["The Night After I Took the Data Entry Job I Was Visited by My Own Ghost"; published through the Vertigo Comics imprint]
- DC Pride 2024 #1 (2024) ["Hello, Spaceboy"]
- Metamorpho: The Element Man #1–6 (2024–2025)
- Absolute Universe
  - Absolute Green Lantern #1–ongoing (2025–present)
  - Absolute Evil #1 (2025)
- Detective Comics Annual 2025 #1 (2025) ["Batman, Do Not Solve My Murder"]

=== Other Publishers ===
- A Wave Blue World
  - Young Men in Love: New Romance (2025) ["Dinner for Two"]
- BOOM! Studios
  - We Only Find Them When They're Dead #1–15 (2020–2022)
- Dynamite Entertainment
  - Garth Ennis' Jennifer Blood #7–24 (2011–2013)
  - Garth Ennis' The Ninjettes #1–6 (2012)
- IDW Comics
  - Mars Attacks Judge Dredd #1–4 (2013)
  - Love Is Love (2016) ["Untitled"]
- Image Comics
  - The CBLDF Presents Liberty Annual #1 (2014) ["Won't Somebody Think of the Children?"]
  - 24 Panels (2018) ["Untitled"]
- Oni Press
  - Cruel Kingdom #1 (2025) ["Friendly Visitors"]
- Titan Comics
  - Doctor Who: The Eleventh Doctor #1–2, 4–5, 8–9, 11, 14–15 (2014–2015) [Issues #1 & 15 co-written with Rob Williams]
  - Doctor Who Free Comic Book Day #2015 (2015) ["Give Free or Die"; co-written with Rob Williams]
