= The Immortal Hulk =

Marvel comic book series

- Cover of Immortal Hulk #1, art by Alex Ross

Publication information
- Publisher: Marvel Comics
- Schedule: Monthly
- Format: Ongoing series
- Genre: Horror, superhero
- Publication date: June 2018 – October 2021
- No. of issues: 50
- Main character: Hulk

Creative team
- Written by: Al Ewing
- Penciller: Joe Bennett
- Inker: Ruy José
- Letterer: Cory Petit
- Colorist: Paul Mounts
- Editor: Tom Brevoort

The Immortal Hulk is an American superhero horror comic book series written by Al Ewing, primarily penciled by Joe Bennett, and published by Marvel Comics. The series follows the various dissociative identities, or "alters", of Bruce Banner as they grapple with the discovery that gamma-irradiated beings such as the Hulk are unable to die.

It quickly garnered critical acclaim, including three Eisner Award nominations for Best Continuing Series. After spawning numerous one-shots by various creative teams and a spinoff miniseries starring Gamma Flight, the series concluded with issue #50 in October 2021.

== Plot ==
After being killed by Hawkeye, (Note: As depicted in issue #3 of Civil War II (2016)) Bruce Banner returns from the dead and realizes that he and the Hulk are able to resurrect through a "Green Door". His vindictive Devil Hulk personality begins to emerge at night, or when Bruce is threatened. Investigative reporter Jackie McGee follows him, wanting to become powerful after the "Savage" Hulk destroyed her home as a child. Walter Langkowski contacts her and agrees to help her in her search, only for his Sasquatch form to become possessed by Brian Banner's spirit and go on a rampage. The Devil Hulk stops him by absorbing his gamma radiation, taking Brian into Bruce's mind in the process. On orders from General Reginald Fortean, head of the covert "Shadow Base", the Avengers attempt to capture Bruce but are bested by the Devil Hulk, forcing Iron Man to kill him. Bruce's body is taken to Shadow Base Site A and is experimented on until the Devil Hulk revives and escapes.

He is lured to the site of the gamma bomb that created him by Brian and is attacked by the Absorbing Man, enhanced by Shadow Base with gamma absorption powers. The Absorbing Man accidentally absorbs Brian, who possesses him and opens the Green Door to the "Below-Place", the bottom layer of Hell. Brian explains to Bruce that after being killed a second time in the Chaos War, (Note: As depicted in issue #620 of The Incredible Hulks (2011)) the "One Below All", the ruler of the Below-Place and the source of all gamma, took his form and plans to possess Bruce. The Absorbing Man restores the Devil Hulk's gamma, allowing him to defeat the One Below All and close the Green Door, returning them to Earth.

Shaken, Bruce goes to Betty Ross and she is killed by the Bushwacker, working as a Shadow Base assassin. She revives as a gamma mutate named the Red Harpy, while Doc Samson, also back from the dead (Note: As depicted in issue #610 of The Incredible Hulk (vol. 2) (2010)) by going through the Green Door, interrogates the Devil Hulk, who explains that he is the manifestation of Bruce's desire for a protective father figure. Rick Jones' body is stolen by Shadow Base and the Devil Hulk returns to Site A, where Fortean uses ultraviolet radiation to turn him back into Bruce. The Bushwacker wounds him, forcing his "Joe Fixit" personality to take over, who outwits and kills the Bushwacker. Shadow Base revives and mutates Rick with the Abomination's DNA, sending him after the Devil Hulk, who defeats him with the help of the Red Harpy.

The Devil Hulk pulls Rick's withered human form out of the Abomination's corpse, while Fortean steals the corpse and kills Langkowski, leaving him unable to revive without his gamma. Fortean fuses with the corpse as Rick awakens with gamma powers and takes the Devil Hulk to Shadow Base Site B in Area 51, where the Devil Hulk kills a degenerating Fortean in a violent struggle before dying. Joe kills Fortean in the Below-Place, halting his resurrection, and the Devil Hulk revives and takes over Site B, allowing its head scientist, Dr. Charlene McGowan, to aid him as he and Bruce publicly broadcast their goal to end capitalistic society for the good of the planet.

The Devil Hulk begins attacking Roxxon, so Roxxon's CEO Dario Agger unleashes four giant monsters on the public, which overwhelm the Devil Hulk and cause him to revert to the Savage Hulk. Xemnu the Living Titan, summoned by Agger, kills the last giant monster and brainwashes the world to remember him as the Hulk. Only the Savage Hulk is unaffected by Xemnu, while his brainwashing causes Bruce to lock the Savage Hulk out. Inside the Hulkscape, the Savage Hulk and the Green Scar find the Devil Hulk mysteriously imprisoned, while the Savage Hulk destroys Xemnu's influence and takes back control. He storms Roxxon with his allies as Xemnu partially digests Agger, while Rick causes the Green Scar to emerge and kill Xemnu. Rick reveals himself to Agger as being controlled by the Leader, having received a distress call from a future universe where the One Below All uses the Hulk to become a cosmic destroyer, inspiring the Leader to harness the power of the Below-Place.

As the Devil Hulk remains trapped, the Savage Hulk rehabilitates his image in the wake of Roxxon's bankruptcy until Rick frames him for releasing a large, fatal burst of gamma energy at a public event. As Gamma Flight arrives to detain the Savage Hulk, Del Frye, a young man injected by his father with gamma who was being experimented on by Shadow Base, is taken over by the Leader, killing Doc Samson. The Leader reveals that he has control of the Below-Place, closing the Green Door and preventing Doc Samson from returning to life. As McGowan transports Rick out of the battle, Gamma Flight kills the Hulk and opens his Green Door. The Leader, having possessed the Green Scar, enters the Hulkscape via the Green Door and imprisons Bruce and the rest of the Hulks. McGowan decapitates Rick with a teleporter when he attacks her while the Leader attempts to take Bruce to the Below-Place, causing the Devil Hulk to break free. Having absorbed Brian's spirit after the incident at the bomb site, the Leader uses his guise to manipulate the Savage Hulk into stalling the Devil Hulk long enough for the Leader to kill him. He then takes Bruce to the Below-Place to make him a vessel for the One Below All, who instead possesses the Leader.

Doc Samson escapes by inhabiting Langkowski's Sasquatch form. With the Hulk imprisoned on Gamma Flight's space base, Joe takes over to escape and falls to Earth as the Hulk, where he lands in New York City and fights the Thing. The Thing relents when he realizes the Savage Hulk's childlike mentality, and he and Joe discuss the Fantastic Four meeting God (Note: As depicted in issue #511 of Fantastic Four (2004)) and how the story of Job relates to Bruce's hardships. Returning to Site B to retrieve his body, Samson finds Rick's head fused with Del after the two were released from the Leader's control, while Langkowski revives in Samson's body. Henry Peter Gyrich sends the U-Foes after the Hulk in New York, who kill him with cosmic radiation, trapping him and Joe in the Below-Place. As they fight the Leader, made infinitely powerful by the One Below All, the cosmic rays allow Joe to attain a powerful Hulk form that is fueled by cosmic energy. He resurrects and easily defeats the U-Foes, forcing Gyrich to call the Avengers. The Red Harpy and Gamma Flight arrive to fight them with Joe, before escaping together with Jen Walters.

While hiding out, Joe and the Red Harpy make love before she reverts to Betty, having refused to do so for Bruce. She admits she was hurt by Bruce's disgust of her Red Harpy form after getting her killed in the first place, only to become furious when she learns Joe left him in the Below-Place. Tired of being strung along by Bruce and his personalities, she accuses Joe of being Bruce's most selfish desires manifested and leaves. Joe takes Jackie, who has been given the power to see hidden gamma beings after the Savage Hulk's gamma burst, to the Fantastic Four to be sent to the Below-Place. Mister Fantastic uses his Forever Gate to send Joe there, only for Jackie to jump in after him.

It is revealed that Bruce and Sam's ancestors were brothers, Robert and Samuel Sterns respectively. After discovering Samuel's affair with Robert's wife, Beatrice Banner, Robert killed Samuel with an irradiated gamma isotope, before tossing Beatrice out of his home. In the Below-Place, the Leader tricks and takes control of the Savage Hulk to kill Joe, only for Jackie to save them both with her newfound gamma abilities. The Hulks pull the Leader's human form of Sam Sterns out of his deformed body and demand the One Below All tell them why they exist. In response, it reveals itself as an extension of the One Above All, an omnipotent being of cosmic energy, explaining that the Hulk destroys so things can be built anew. It leaves the Savage Hulk to decide what to do with Sterns. Realizing Sterns' thinking had been deformed by the gamma, the Savage Hulk decides they are the same and shows him mercy because "Hulks should forgive Hulks". Langkowski uses his gamma signature to find the Below-Place, and the Hulks and Jackie leave with Bruce and Sterns. Joe promises his services to Jackie as penance for destroying her home, and when they return to Earth, Bruce, having found equilibrium with the Hulks, slips away from his friends and leaves, wondering if his decisions have made him a good person.

== Themes ==
In its 50-issue span, The Immortal Hulk addresses a wide range of themes. Its opening issues focus on the idea that all people have a monstrous side to their nature. After the Hulk travels to Hell, questions of the problem of evil and the nature of morality come to the fore. The introduction of Joe Fixit and the Savage Hulk into the story, as well as the sealing away of the Devil Hulk (the main Hulk persona seen in the first half of the series) in Bruce's mindscape, leads to an exploration of dissociative identity disorder and the reconceptualization of the Hulk's psychological makeup as a "system" rather than a Banner-Hulk binary. The Roxxon storyline takes an environmentalist approach, portraying the dangers of capitalism and propagandistic media. Additionally, race, gender identity, and religion (particularly Judaism) are also explored.

== Reception ==
The Immortal Hulk garnered high praise following its debut in 2018. Matt Lune of Multiversity Comics called the first issue "extremely well done", praising the reimagining of the Hulk as "a terrifying figure, with a grim, twisted, toothy smile, piercing stare and distinctly disturbing eloquence." In 2019, 2020, and 2022, the series was nominated for the Eisner Award for Best Continuing Series. Upon completion of the series, Tony Thornley of Comicon.com called it:

the greatest run ever written about [the Hulk]. This is a seminal story that started as a monster movie, evolved into a supernatural thriller, then a cosmic horror. It further molted into an anti-capitalist protest. A psychological thriller. Back to cosmic horror. And then a meditation on the character himself and what made him great. [...] In the end, we got a single, continuous Hulk story that redefined the character, his powers, his world, even his mental illness. [...] We find ourselves at the conclusion of one of the greatest comics series Marvel has ever published.

== Artist controversy ==
Bennett caused controversy by including what was interpreted as antisemitic imagery in the background of a panel in The Immortal Hulk #43. Though the imagery made it to print in the single issue, it was removed in collected editions. Following this, a 2017 political cartoon resurfaced in which the then-Brazilian presidential candidate Jair Bolsonaro was allegorically depicted as an "Independence Dragoon" (a member of a historical Brazilian military unit) fighting political opponents (including former presidents Luiz Inácio Lula da Silva, Dilma Rousseff, and Michel Temer) in the shape of monstrous rats. In response to this illustration, Ewing severed all of his ties with Bennett. On 9 September 2021, Marvel then announced that he had been removed from his current assignments and was not on any future Marvel projects.

== One-shots ==
In addition to the main 50-issue run, several Immortal Hulk one-shots were released. Initially created as a way for the series to tie into crossover events without intruding on the main series, these one-shots expanded their focus to allow other creative teams a chance to tell self-contained Immortal Hulk stories.

Title	Writer	Artist	Colorist	Notes	Release date
Immortal Hulk: The Best Defense #1	Al Ewing	Simone Di Meo	Dono Sánchez-Almara	Tie-in to the Defenders: The Best Defense crossover event	December 5, 2018
Absolute Carnage: Immortal Hulk #1	Al Ewing	Filipe Andrade	Chris O'Halloran	Tie-in to the Absolute Carnage crossover event	October 2, 2019
Immortal Hulk: Great Power #1	Tom Taylor	Jorge Molina; Adriano Di Benedetto; Roberto Poggi	David Curiel		February 5, 2020
Immortal Hulk #0	Al Ewing	Mattia de Iulis		Original framing story	September 16, 2020
Immortal Hulk #0	Bill Mantlo	Mike Mignola; Gerry Talaoc	Bob Sharen	Reprint of Incredible Hulk (vol. 2) #312	September 16, 2020
Immortal Hulk #0	Peter David	Adam Kubert; Mark Farmer	Dan Brown	Reprint of Incredible Hulk (vol. 2) #-1	September 16, 2020
Empyre: The Immortal She-Hulk #1	Al Ewing	Jon Davis-Hunt	Marcio Menyz	Tie-in to Empyre crossover	September 23, 2020
Immortal Hulk: The Threshing Place #1	Jeff Lemire	Mike del Mundo	Mike del Mundo; Marco D'Alfonso		September 30, 2020
King in Black: Immortal Hulk #1	Al Ewing	Aaron Kuder	Frank Martin; Erick Arciniega	Tie-in to the King in Black crossover event	December 16, 2020
Immortal Hulk: Flatline #1	Declan Shalvey				February 17, 2021
Immortal Hulk: Time of Monsters #1	Alex Paknadel; Al Ewing	Juan Ferreyra		Introduces the prehistoric "original Hulk"	May 19, 2021
Immortal Hulk: Time of Monsters #1	David Vaughan	Kevin Nowlan			May 19, 2021

== Collected editions ==
The series has been collected into a number of hardcover and trade paperback collections:

=== Trade paperbacks ===
Volume	Title	Material collected	Page count	Publication date	ISBN	Additional notes
1	Or Is He Both?	Immortal Hulk #1–5; material from Avengers (vol. 7) #684	136	November 20, 2018	978-1302912550	
2	The Green Door	Immortal Hulk #6–10	112	February 12, 2019	978-1302912567	
3	Hulk in Hell	Immortal Hulk #11–15	112	May 14, 2019	978-1302915063	
4	Abomination	Immortal Hulk #16–20	136	September 3, 2019	978-1302912550	
5	Breaker of Worlds	Immortal Hulk #21–25	136	November 19, 2019	978-1302916688	
6	We Believe in Bruce Banner	Immortal Hulk #26–30	112	March 17, 2020	978-1302920500	
7	Hulk is Hulk	Immortal Hulk #31–35	136	September 1, 2020	978-1302920517	
8	The Keeper of the Door	Immortal Hulk #36–40	112	January 19, 2021	978-1302920524	
9	The Weakest One There Is	Immortal Hulk #41–45	112	June 8, 2021	978-1302925970	
10	Of Hell and of Death	Immortal Hulk #46–50	184	December 7, 2021	978-1302925987	
11	Apocrypha	Immortal Hulk: The Best Defense #1, Defenders: The Best Defense #1, Absolute Carnage: Immortal Hulk #1, Immortal Hulk #0, Empyre: The Immortal She-Hulk #1, King in Black: Immortal Hulk #1, material from Immortal Hulk: Time of Monsters #1	248	January 11, 2022	978-1302931162	Anthology collection of the Ewing-written Immortal Hulk one-shots
	Great Power	Immortal Hulk: Great Power #1, Immortal Hulk: The Threshing Place #1, Immortal Hulk: Flatline #1, material from Immortal Hulk: Time of Monsters #1	112	November 2, 2021	978-1302931179	Anthology collection of the non-Ewing-written Immortal Hulk one-shots
	Gamma Flight	Gamma Flight #1–5	112	January 4, 2022	978-1302928063	Spin-off miniseries following Gamma Flight's activities after the events of Immortal Hulk #47
	Defenders: There Are No Rules	Defenders (vol. 6) #1–5; material from Marvel Comics #1000–1001	144	May 3, 2022	978-1302924720	Related miniseries revealing where the Red Harpy went after she left the Hulk in Immortal Hulk #48

=== Hardcovers ===
Volume	Material collected	Page count	Publication date	ISBN	Additional notes
Book 1	Immortal Hulk #1–10; material from Avengers (vol. 7) #684	264	October 15, 2019	978-1302919658	Compilation of the Vol. 1 and Vol. 2 trade paperbacks
Book 2	Immortal Hulk #11–20	232	July 7, 2020	978-1302923471	Compilation of the Vol. 3 and Vol. 4 trade paperbacks
Book 3	Immortal Hulk #21–30	256	May 11, 2021	978-1302928308	Compilation of the Vol. 5 and Vol. 6 trade paperbacks
Book 4	Immortal Hulk #31–40	248	November 16, 2021	978-1302931285	Compilation of the Vol. 7 and Vol. 8 trade paperbacks
Book 5	Immortal Hulk #41–50	304	December 6, 2022	978-1302945268	Compilation of the Vol. 9 and Vol. 10 trade paperbacks
Immortal Hulk Omnibus	Immortal Hulk #1–50, Immortal Hulk: The Best Defense #1, Defenders: The Best Defense #1, Absolute Carnage: Immortal Hulk #1, Immortal Hulk #0, Empyre: The Immortal She-Hulk #1, King in Black: Immortal Hulk #1, Gamma Flight #1–5, material from Avengers #684 and Immortal Hulk: Time of Monsters #1	1,616	August 15, 2023	978-1302916688	Collection of all of the Ewing-written Immortal Hulk material; does not include Immortal Hulk: Great Power #1, Immortal Hulk: The Threshing Place #1, Immortal Hulk: Flatline #1, the non-Ewing-written material from Immortal Hulk: Time of Monsters #1, or Defenders (vol. 6) #1–5

== See also ==
- The Incredible Hulk (comic book)
- The Immortal Thor
