= The Last Fantastic Four Story =

Comic book by Stan Lee

- Cover to The Last Fantastic Four Story. Art by John Romita Jr.

Publication information
- Format: One-shot
- Genre: Superhero
- Publication date: October 2007
- No. of issues: 1

Creative team
- Written by: Stan Lee
- Penciller: John Romita Jr.
- Inker: Scott Hanna
- Letterer: Joe Caramagna
- Colorist: Morry Jay Hollowell
- Editor: Tom Brevoort

The Last Fantastic Four Story is a 2007 comic book one-shot written by Stan Lee and drawn by penciller John Romita Jr., and inker Scott Hanna. First published on August 29, 2007, by Marvel Comics, it is a supposed final tale about the Fantastic Four's last mission by fighting a greater doom, before their retirement. It received mixed reviews.

== Synopsis ==
After fighting a terrorist crisis in the Adirondack Mountains, the Fantastic Four feel that after long careers helping to defend humanity, that they should retire. However Reed Richards discovers some strange unusual events such as birds dying, disappearing desert oases, the evaporation of Earth's ozone layer, and unusual oceanic tides. The Watcher arrives to bid farewell to Reed, informing him that the Cosmic Tribunal has decided to destroy the warfare-prone human race by unleashing a greater being known as the Adjudicator.

As the Adjudicator arrives on Earth to announce his intentions, all of humanity is not convinced of the threat. Namor and his Atlantean army begin to attack New York City, under the mistaken belief that humanity has caused the oceanic disturbances, but Reed convinces him that it is the Adjudicator's doing. Namor attacks the Adjudicator, but the Adjudicator forces Namor and his armies to retreat, and also repels attacks from human armies and Doctor Doom, the Fantastic Four, the Avengers, and the Inhumans.

Richards and the Silver Surfer attempt to use mindless robots called the Decimators to destroy the Cosmic Tribunal, but eventually abort their attack, rather than allow an entire race to be slaughtered. The Tribunal is grateful to the Fantastic Four, and to humanity. After the Fantastic Four is honored by the United Nations, they finally retire. Ben Grimm and his girlfriend, Alicia Masters, move to a small cottage far from New York, while Reed and the others leave in the Fantasticar for a new life.
