= The Immortal Thor =

Marvel comic book series

- Cover of Immortal Thor #1, art by Alex Ross

Publication information
- Publisher: Marvel Comics
- Schedule: Monthly
- Format: Ongoing series
- Genre: Fantasy, superhero
- Publication date: August 23, 2023 – present
- No. of issues: (Immortal Thor); 25 (Mortal Thor); Ongoing
- Main character: Thor

Creative team
- Written by: Al Ewing
- Artist(s): (Immortal Thor); Martin Cóccolo; Jan Bazaldua (Mortal Thor); Pasqual Ferry
- Letterer: Joe Sabino
- Colorist(s): Matt Wilson; Matt Hollingsworth
- Editor: Will Moss

The Immortal Thor is a superhero fantasy comic book series written by Al Ewing and published by Marvel Comics. Its artists include Martin Cóccolo, Jan Bazaldua, and Pasqual Ferry, with Alex Ross as the cover artist. The title stars Thor, now finally satisfied with his role as All-Father of Asgard, and the Ten Realms, finding himself challenged by the gods of Utgard.

The series has received acclaim from critics, fans and audiences alike. After 25 issues under its original title, the book was relaunched as The Mortal Thor in August 2025.

== Summary ==
The series begins in the aftermath of the Thor 2020 comic series written by Donny Cates and Torunn Grønbekk, where Thor begins his next adventure as he put his divine limits against the Gods of Utgard; his adoptive sibling Loki; the corrupt corporation Roxxon, led by Dario Agger; Enchantress; and Executioner. During the seventeenth issue of the comic book, Magni Thorson, the son of Thor and Amora from an alternate universe where Thor and the other Asgardians took control of Earth, is summoned to the main continuity.

== Themes ==
Unlike The Immortal Hulk, whose themes were about body horror, vengeance, morality and forgiveness, The Immortal Thor is a deconstruction of stories that are being told under the shadow of a large corporation. It riffs on the necessity of power scaling, the demand for a unified canon, and the way in which external, non-creative forces can undermine the point of a piece of art. The central theme of the comic series serves as a meta-commentary of how executive and editorial meddling through media change not just the storytelling made by writers, but also how those changes shape the fictional characters and their world.

== Collected editions ==
The series has been collected into a number of trade paperback collections:

=== The Immortal Thor ===
Volume	Title	Material collected	Page count	Publication date	ISBN	Additional notes
1	All Weather Turns To Storm	Immortal Thor #1–5, material from Thor Annual (2023) #1	136	March 12, 2024	978-1302954185	
2	All Trials Are One	Immortal Thor #6–10, Roxxon Presents: Thor #1	144	August 6, 2024	978-1302954192	
3	The End Of All Songs	Immortal Thor #11–15, material from Immortal Thor #1	128	December 3, 2024	978-1302954642	
4	The Son of Thor	Immortal Thor #16–20	120	July 1, 2025	978-1302960810	
5	Death Of The Immortal Thor	Immortal Thor #21–25	136	September 30, 2025	978-1302960827	

=== The Mortal Thor ===
Volume	Title	Material collected	Page count	Publication date	ISBN	Additional notes
1	No Gods, No Masters	Mortal Thor #1–5	128	April 21, 2026	978-1302965648	

== See also ==
- Thor (comic book)
- The Immortal Hulk
