= The Incredible Hulk (comic book) =

Marvel comic book series

- Cover of The Incredible Hulk #1 (May 1962); Art by Jack Kirby and Paul Reinman

Publication information
- Publisher: Marvel Comics
- Format: Ongoing series
- Genre: Superhero
- Publication date: List: (vol. 1) May 1962 – March 1963 (vol. 2) April 1968 – March 1999 (Hulk vol. 1) April 1999 – February 2000 (vol. 3) March 2000 – December 2007 (Hulk vol. 2) March 2008 – October 2012 (vol. 2 cont.) September 2009 – October 2010 (Incredible Hulks) November 2010 – October 2011 (vol. 4) December 2011 – December 2012 (Indestructible Hulk) January 2013 – May 2014 (Hulk vol. 3) June 2014 – July 2015 (Totally Awesome Hulk) February 2016 – November 2017 (Hulk vol. 4) February 2017 – December 2017 (vol. 2 cont. #2) December 2017 – July 2018 (The Immortal Hulk) August 2018 – December 2021 (Hulk vol. 5) January 2022 – June 2023 (vol. 4) August 2023 – December 2025 (Infernal Hulk) January 2026 – present
- No. of issues: List: (vol. 1) 6 (#1–6) (vol. 2) 374 (#102–474 plus #−1) (Hulk vol. 1) 11 (#1–11) (vol. 3) 100 (#12–111) (Hulk vol. 2) 57 (#1–57) (vol. 2 cont.) 12 (#600–611) (Incredible Hulks) 24 (#612–635) (vol. 4) 15 (#1–15) (Indestructible Hulk) 20 (#1–20) (Hulk vol. 3) 16 (#1–16) (Totally Awesome Hulk) 24 (#1–23 plus #1.MU) (Hulk vol. 4) 11 (#1–11) (vol. 2 cont. #2) 9 (#709–717) (The Immortal Hulk) 50 (#1–50) (Hulk vol. 5) 14 (#1–14) (vol. 4) 30 (#1–30) (as of December 2025 cover date) (Infernal Hulk) 1 (#1) (as of January 2026 cover date)
- Main character: Hulk

Creative team
- Created by: Stan Lee; Jack Kirby
- Written by: List: (vol. 1) Stan Lee (1–6) (vol. 2) Gary Friedrich (102–104, 107, 152–153, Annual #1), Stan Lee (108–120), Roy Thomas (105–106, 121–147, 158, 172–178), Archie Goodwin (106, 148–151, 154–157), Steve Englehart (152, 159–172), Len Wein (179–220, 222, Annual #5–6), Roger Stern (218–221, 223–229, 231–243, Annual #7–8), Bill Mantlo (245–313, Annual #10–13), John Byrne (314–319, Annual #7–8, 14, #1999), Al Milgrom (320–327, 329-330), Peter David (328, 331–359, 361–467, Annual #16–20)
- Penciller: List: (vol. 1) Jack Kirby Steve Ditko (vol. 2) Marie Severin Herb Trimpe Sal Buscema John Byrne Al Milgrom Todd McFarlane Jeff Purves Dale Keown
- Inker: List: (vol. 1) Dick Ayers (vol. 2) George Tuska John Severin Sam Grainger Jack Abel Joe Staton Gerry Talaoc Marie Severin Bob McLeod Mark Farmer

The Incredible Hulk is a superhero comic book series published by Marvel Comics. Created by Stan Lee and Jack Kirby, it stars scientist Bruce Banner, who is irradiated by gamma rays that cause him to transform under stress into the Hulk, a giant powerful green-skinned monster who is the manifestation of Banner's anger.

The comic has been published on and off since 1962, and has been passed to many high-profile comics writers, such as Bill Mantlo, Peter David, and Greg Pak. Throughout its publication history, it has been intermittently replaced as the primary Hulk title by other series, including Tales to Astonish (1963–68), Indestructible Hulk (2013–15), and The Immortal Hulk (2018–21). The title was most recently written by Phillip Kennedy Johnson, who relaunched it as The Infernal Hulk in 2025.

== Publication history ==
The original series was canceled with issue #6 (March 1963). Lee had written each story, with Jack Kirby penciling the first five issues and Steve Ditko penciling and inking the sixth.

=== Tales to Astonish ===
Cover of Tales to Astonish #60 (Oct. 1964). Art by Jack Kirby and Sol Brodsky

A year and a half after the series was canceled, the Hulk became one of two features in Tales to Astonish, beginning in issue #60 (Oct. 1964).

This new Hulk feature was initially scripted by writer-editor Lee and illustrated by the team of penciller Steve Ditko and inker George Roussos. Other artists later in this run included Jack Kirby from #68–87 (June 1965 – Oct. 1966), doing full pencils or, more often, layouts for other artists; Gil Kane, credited as "Scott Edwards", in #76 (February 1966), his first Marvel Comics work; Bill Everett inking Kirby in #78–84 (Feb–Oct. 1966); and John Buscema penciling Kirby's layouts in #85–87. The Tales to Astonish run introduced the supervillains the Leader, who would become the Hulk's nemesis, and the Abomination, another gamma-irradiated being. Comics artist Marie Severin finished out the Hulk's run in Tales to Astonish.

Beginning with issue #102 (April 1968) the book was retitled The Incredible Hulk (vol. 2) and ran until 1999, when Marvel canceled the series and restarted the title with the shorter-titled Hulk #1.

=== 1970s ===
The Incredible Hulk (vol. 2) was published through the 1970s. At times, the writers included Archie Goodwin, Chris Claremont, and Tony Isabella. Len Wein wrote the series from 1974 through 1978. Nearly all of the 1970s issues were drawn by either Herb Trimpe, who was the regular artist for seven years, or Sal Buscema, who was the regular artist for 10 years, starting with issue #194 (December 1975). Issues #180–181 (Oct.–Nov. 1974) introduced the character Wolverine, who would go on to become one of Marvel Comics' most popular. The original art for the comic book page that introduced Wolverine sold for $657,250 in May 2014. Key supporting characters included Jim Wilson and Jarella, both of whom would make few appearances outside of this decade.

In 1977, Marvel launched a second title, The Rampaging Hulk, a black-and-white comics magazine. This was originally conceived as a flashback series, set between the end of his original, short-lived solo title and the beginning of his feature in Tales to Astonish. After nine issues, the magazine was retitled The Hulk! and printed in color. A nine-part "continuity insert" that in many ways contradicted the original comics stories was retconned later as an in-universe film made by Bereet.

=== 1980s and 1990s ===
Following Roger Stern, Bill Mantlo took over the writing with issue #245 (March 1980). Among the adversaries Mantlo created for the series were the U-Foes and the Soviet Super-Soldiers. Mantlo's "Crossroads of Eternity" stories, which ran through issues #300–313 (Oct. 1984 – Nov.1985), explored the idea that Banner had suffered child abuse. Later, The Incredible Hulk writers Peter David and Greg Pak called these stories an influence on their approaches to the series. After five years, Mantlo left the title to write Alpha Flight, while Alpha Flight writer John Byrne took over the series and left it after six issues, claiming, "I took on the Hulk after a discussion with editor-in-chief Jim Shooter, in which I mentioned some of the things I would like to do with that character, given the chance. He told me to do whatever was necessary to get on the book, he liked my ideas so much. I did, and once installed he immediately changed his mind—'You can't do this!' Six issues was as much as I could take." Byrne's final issue featured the wedding of Bruce Banner and Betty Ross. Byrne had done a seventh issue, consisting entirely of one-panel pages. It was eventually published in Marvel Fanfare #29.

Al Milgrom briefly succeeded Byrne before new regular writer Peter David took over with issue #331 (May 1987), the start of an 11-year tenure. He returned to the Stern and Mantlo abuse storyline, expanding the damage caused, and depicting Banner as suffering dissociative identity disorder. In issue #377 he merged Banner, the green Hulk, and the grey Hulk into a single being with the unified personality, intelligence, and powers of all three. David claimed he had been planning this from the beginning of his tenure on the series, and had held off so that he could make the readers have an emotional attachment to the grey Hulk. David worked with numerous artists over his run on the series, including Dale Keown, Todd McFarlane, Sam Kieth, Gary Frank, Liam Sharp, Terry Dodson, Mike Deodato, George Pérez, and Adam Kubert.

In 1998, David followed editor Bobbie Chase's suggestion to kill Betty Ross. In the introduction to the Hulk trade paperback Beauty and the Behemoth, David said that his wife had recently left him, providing inspiration for the storyline. Marvel executives used Ross' death as an opportunity to push the idea of bringing back the Savage Hulk. David disagreed, leading to his parting ways with Marvel. His last issue of The Incredible Hulk was (vol. 2) #467 (Aug. 1998), his 137th. Also in 1998, Marvel relaunched The Rampaging Hulk as a standard comic book rather than as a comics magazine.

=== Relaunches ===
Following David's departure, Joe Casey took over as writer until this series ended with The Incredible Hulk (vol. 2) #474 (March 1999). The first volume of the shorter-titled Hulk began immediately the following month, scripted by Byrne and penciled by Ron Garney.

Erik Larsen and Jerry Ordway briefly took over scripting and with issue #12 (March 2000) the series was restarted as The Incredible Hulk vol. 3. New series writer Paul Jenkins developed the Hulk's multiple personalities, and his run was followed by Bruce Jones. Jones' storyline featuring Banner being pursued by a secret conspiracy and aided by the mysterious Mr. Blue. Jones appended to his 43 issues of Incredible Hulk the limited series Hulk/Thing: Hard Knocks #1–4 (Nov. 2004 – Feb. 2005), which Marvel published after putting the ongoing series on hiatus.

Peter David, who had initially signed a contract for the six-issue Tempest Fugit limited series, returned as writer when it was decided to make that story the first five parts of the revived volume three. After a four-part tie-in to the House of M crossover and a one-issue epilogue, David left the series once more, citing the need to do non-Hulk work for the sake of his career.

In 2006, writer Greg Pak took over the series. With issue #113 (Feb. 2008), it was retitled The Incredible Hercules, still written by Pak but starring the mythological demigod Hercules and teenage genius Amadeus Cho. Concurrently, Marvel launched Hulk (vol. 2), written by Jeph Loeb and drawn by Ed McGuinness. While continuing to publish Hulk (vol. 2), Marvel also relaunched the second 1960s Hulk series with The Incredible Hulk (vol. 2) #600 (Sept. 2009). With the arrival of the Red Hulk—a transformed General "Thunderbolt" Ross, the Hulk's longtime nemesis—and the Red She-Hulk—the revived Betty Ross—this series was retitled Incredible Hulks with issue #612 (Nov. 2010). This lasted through issue #635 (Oct. 2011). Yet another Hulk series, The Incredible Hulk vol. 4, written by Jason Aaron and drawn by Marc Silvestri, began with a new #1 and lasted 15 issues (Dec. 2011 – Dec. 2012). In November 2012, Marvel announced it would publish a new Hulk title, Indestructible Hulk, by writer Mark Waid and artist Leinil Yu. Hulk (vol. 2) became Red She-Hulk with issue #58 (Dec. 2012).

In 2015, Amadeus Cho became the "Totally Awesome Hulk", replacing Bruce Banner. Shortly afterward, Banner was killed in the 2016 storyline Civil War II. In 2017, The Incredible Hulk was relaunched with issue #709, with the series using "legacy numbering". In 2019, Banner was resurrected in the series The Immortal Hulk, which features horror-inspired stories.

In 2023, The Incredible Hulk was relaunched with volume 4 (issue #782), written by Phillip Kennedy Johnson with art by Nic Klein. It continues the horror themes established by The Immortal Hulk and sees Hulk travel around the United States and battle monsters alongside the newly introduced character Charlie Tidwell.

In 2025, The Incredible Hulk was relaunched as The Infernal Hulk, with Phillip Kennedy Johnson and Nic Klein returning. The series sees the Hulk separated from Bruce Banner by the Eldest, an ancient being who subsequently possesses Hulk and uses him as a weapon. The Infernal Hulk lasted 10 issues, a decision made by Johnson and Klein as part of their plans for the character.

== Accolades ==
Year	Award	Category	Recipient	Result	Ref.
2019	Eisner Award	Best Continuing Series	The Immortal Hulk	Nominated	
