= The Lord of the Rings: The Third Age =

2004 video game

- Developer: EA Redwood Shores
- Publisher: EA Games
- Producer: Todd Arnold
- Designer: Chris Tremmel
- Programmer: Dom Regan
- Writer: Michael Becker
- Platforms: PlayStation 2, Xbox, GameCube
- Release: PlayStation 2, Xbox: NA/AU: November 2, 2004; EU: November 5, 2004; GameCube: AU: October 29, 2004; NA: November 2, 2004; EU: November 12, 2004
- Genre: Role-playing
- Modes: Single-player, multiplayer

The Lord of the Rings: The Third Age is a 2004 turn-based role-playing video game developed by EA Redwood Shores for the PlayStation 2, Xbox and GameCube. A turn-based tactics version of the game was developed for the Game Boy Advance by Griptonite Games. The game was published on all platforms by Electronic Arts, and released worldwide in November 2004.

The game is a loose adaptation of Peter Jackson's Lord of the Rings film trilogy: The Fellowship of the Ring (2001), The Two Towers (2002) and The Return of the King (2003). As it is not an adaptation of J. R. R. Tolkien's 1954 novel The Lord of the Rings, anything from the novels not specifically mentioned or depicted in the films could not be represented in the game. This is because, at the time, Vivendi Universal Games, in partnership with Tolkien Enterprises, held the rights to the video game adaptations of Tolkien's literary works, while Electronic Arts held the rights to the video game adaptations of the New Line Cinema films. The story takes place concurrently to the film trilogy, and follows a party of original characters on a journey parallel to the Fellowship, playing a key, previously-unseen role in its events.

The game received mixed reviews. Most reviewers praised the graphics and visuals, but there were criticisms of the story and character development, and some felt the game was somewhat too derivative of Final Fantasy X.

== Gameplay ==
As with many role playing games, gameplay in Third Age is split into two different modes; third-person exploration through a 3D overworld, and combat mode, consisting of turn-based gameplay.

Progression through the game is built around "Quests". Every area features multiple quests which must be completed in order to progress to the next area. All areas also feature several optional side quests which do not have to be completed for progression, but which can yield substantial rewards if they are. When the player is in third-person mode, the HUD displays a map with the current objectives (primary and secondary) marked on it. As the player moves through the environment, one of two icons can also appear on-screen. If the Eye of Sauron appears, it means the player has a chance to encounter a random battle; the darker the eye, the more likely a battle will occur. If a blue Palantír appears, it means the player is approaching a story battle; again, the darker the icon, the closer the player is to the battle. However, not every scripted battle is indicated beforehand by a Palantír icon.

Combat in The Third Age. In this screenshot, Berethor, Elegost and Idrial are surrounded by goblins in Moria. The battle queue is on the upper right of the screen, the characters' stats on the lower right, the action menu on the lower left, and a description of the currently highlighted action on the upper left.

The Third Age is an RPG in the style of the games in the Final Fantasy series. The game's turn-based combat system is similar to Final Fantasy X's "Conditional Turn-Based" system (CTB), which replaced the "Active Time Battle" system (ATB) used from Final Fantasy IV to Final Fantasy IX. The primary difference between the ATB and the CTB is that in the CTB system, time pauses as the player selects commands, whereas in the ATB system, time continues to pass. As such, in the ATB system, even when the player is selecting actions, the enemy can continue to attack. In the CTB system, however, the enemy will not attack the player until the player has had their turn. During battle, a "battle queue" is displayed on-screen. This shows the order in which the player's party and the enemy will take their turns. However, the order of battle can be changed by using abilities to slow down or stun the enemy, or speed up the player characters. Likewise, the enemies can increase their own speed and decrease the party's, again changing the order. The queue changes each time a turn is completed. The player can only have three active party members in any given battle, but in most battles, they are free to switch party members in and out of combat. Occasionally, the player will be joined by a fourth member, who is usually a character from the films, and is controllable for one or two battles only.

Battles are structured around the player selecting actions from the battle menu. Actions include options such as "Attack", "Change Weapon", "Item" and "Skip". Another feature of battling is "Perfect Mode". As the player successfully executes attacks on the enemy, their momentum meter will fill. When it is completely full, any member of the party can select "Perfect Mode" from the menu and execute a more powerful attack. Perfect attacks are general to the party, with any character able to execute any attack; they are not specific to each character. At the end of each battle, each member of the party receives experience points, based upon their actions during the battle. For example, if one character killed all the enemies, they will get more points than the others. If a character did not participate in the battle at all, they will get less points than those who did. Gaining experience points leads to the characters leveling up. When a character levels up, they receive attribute points, which they can spend on their various attributes; Strength, Spirit, Constitution, Speed and Dexterity. Weaponry and armor also affect the level of each attribute.

Each character also has access to their own unique set of skills. Every character has four basic types of skill set; one based upon their primary weapon, another based around magic, another determining what attacks are available in Perfect Mode, and a fourth determining their passive skills. Depending on what "elf stones" they have equipped, any given character may also have skill sets relating to Lightcraft, Shadowcraft and Item Creation. For all skills except passive skills and perfect mode, the character can only learn new skills by performing the skills which they have already learned from that set a predetermined number of times. Each successful execution of a skill earns one skill point for the next skill. As the character advances, the choice of skills available to them increases, and they can choose what skill to learn next. Skill points for perfect mode and passive skills are attached to experience level rather than successful execution of skills.

The game also features a mini-game called "Evil Mode". As the player completes each area in the main game, that area becomes available to play in evil mode. In this mode, the player controls the forces of Sauron and fights against the main game's player characters. Each area features a set number of battles, between which the player cannot save. If the player successfully completes the battles in a particular area, special items are unlocked, and added to the player's inventory in the main game.

== Synopsis ==
Although the main narrative of the game runs parallel to the narrative in the film trilogy, the plot is not intended as an original canonical story to fit into the plot as developed in the films. This is primarily seen insofar as the party are present during certain battles which in the films are solo fights, such as when Gandalf faces the Balrog in The Fellowship of the Ring or when Éowyn faces the Witch-king of Angmar in The Return of the King. The game also features events which don't take place in the films at all; such as a battle between the party and Gríma Wormtongue in Snowbourne, and another against the Eye of Sauron atop Barad-dûr. Throughout the game, Gandalf 'speaks' to Berethor by means of "Epic Scenes"; film clips which the player can collect and which feature original narration by Gandalf. These clips give context to much of the plot and serve to offer advice to Berethor of events in the wider world.

=== Background ===
The game is presented against the background of the history of the One Ring. At the dawn of the Second Age, after the defeat of the Dark Lord, Morgoth, the elves forged Rings of Power to help themselves, the dwarves and men rule Middle-earth. However, the elves were unaware that Sauron, Morgoth's closest ally, had survived his master's defeat, and in the guise of Annatar had been the one who taught the Elven-smiths, led by Celebrimbor, how to forge the Rings, whilst, in secret, he forged his own One Ring in the fires of Mount Doom, a Ring far more powerful than any of the others. However, in order for the One Ring to be powerful enough to control the other Rings, Sauron had to transfer most of his power into it. As soon as he put it on, the elves became aware of his ruse, removing and hiding their Three Rings, which Celebrimbor had forged without Sauron's aid. Sauron waged war on the elves, conquering much of Middle-earth and killing Celebrimbor. Thus began the Dark Years, when Sauron took possession of the remaining sixteen Rings, giving seven to the dwarves and nine to men in an effort to corrupt them. The dwarves proved relatively immune to the powers of the Rings, acquiring only a greed for gold, and becoming unconcerned with events in the wider world. Men proved less resilient, and the nine kings given the Rings turned into the nine Ring-wraiths, or Nazgûl, led by the Witch-king of Angmar.

In his ongoing efforts to conquer Middle-earth, Sauron regained the allegiance of many of Morgoth's servants from the First Age, and successfully corrupted Númenor. However, in doing so, he expended a great deal of his power, and lost the ability to ever again assume a pleasing disguise. Returning to Mordor, he regained his strength, eventually capturing Minas Ithil. However, realizing that if they did not join together, Sauron would destroy both men and elves, Elendil and Gil-galad formed the Last Alliance of Men and Elves, and attacked Sauron in his fortress, Barad-dûr. The alliance was victorious, with Isildur cutting the One Ring from Sauron's hand. However, although presented with a chance to destroy the Ring, Isildur, already beginning to succumb to its corruption, chose not to do so. As such, although Sauron's physical form was vanquished, his spirit, bound to the Ring, survived. Some time later, Isildur was attacked and killed by a band of orcs, and the Ring was lost in the river Anduin for over two thousand years.

Meanwhile, during the Third Age, a still weakened Sauron covertly established a stronghold at Dol Guldur. In response to this undetermined evil, the Valar sent five Maiar to Middle-earth. Taking the form of wizards, they were led by Saruman. Unsure of the origin of the evil power in Dol Guldur, the wizard Gandalf was sent to investigate. However, Sauron hid from Gandalf, waiting for four hundred years before returning. Around the same time, the One Ring was found by a Hobbit named Sméagol, who became utterly corrupted by it, living in the caves of the Misty Mountains, and physically transforming into a creature known as Gollum. For five hundred years, Gollum was consumed and corrupted by the Ring. Eventually, Gandalf was able to determine the evil presence in Dol Guldur was indeed Sauron. Gandalf reported back to the White Council, but Saruman dissuaded them from moving against Sauron. Only when he learned the One Ring may be in the vicinity of the Gladden Fields did Saruman agree to attack Sauron, hoping to find the Ring himself. The Council drove Sauron from Dol Guldur, unaware that he knew the Ring had been found. Just prior to Sauron's departure, the Ring passed to another hobbit, Bilbo Baggins, who used it to assist in the victory of elves, men and dwarves at the Battle of the Five Armies. Sixty years later, Gollum was captured by Uruk-hai, and taken to Mordor, where he was tortured into revealing the owner and location of the Ring; Bilbo Baggins of the Shire. In the meantime, Bilbo had left the Shire to live in Rivendell, and upon the advice of Gandalf had (very reluctantly) given the Ring to his nephew, Frodo Baggins. With the information given him by Gollum, Sauron, still unable to take physical form, thus sent the Nazgûl to the Shire to retrieve the One Ring. Frodo, and his friends, Samwise Gamgee, Peregrin "Pippin" Took and Meriadoc "Merry" Brandybuck managed to escape the Shire and make it to Bree, where they encountered the ranger Aragorn, the last surviving descendant of Isildur, and rightful heir to the throne of Gondor. Aragorn protected the hobbits on their journey to Rivendell, and upon their arrival, Elrond formed a Fellowship with the goal of bringing the Ring to Mordor to destroy it. The Fellowship is composed of Frodo, Sam, Merry, Pippin, Aragorn, Gandalf, an elf named Legolas, a dwarf named Gimli, and a man from Gondor named Boromir, son of Denethor, Steward of Gondor.

=== Plot ===
The game begins with Berethor (voiced by Rhys Lloyd), a captain in the Citadel Guard of Gondor, traveling to Rivendell to find Boromir. On the outskirts of Rivendell, he is attacked by the Nazgûl, but is rescued by Idrial (Lori Phillips), an elf in the service of Galadriel. As they travel through the forest, they see a murder of crebain (evil crows sent out as spies) and Idrial deduces that Saruman (Christopher Lee) has betrayed the elves leaving Middle-earth for the Grey Havens. Seeing her convoy under attack by Isengard orcs, she and Berethor intervene. They then head to Caradhras to seek any further survivors, and there meet Elegost (Chris Edgerly), a Dúnedain ranger hunting Warg. They learn the Fellowship tried to pass over Caradhras recently, but were prevented from doing so by a snowstorm unleashed by Saruman, and so they instead elected to pass through the mines of Moria. Elegost explains he was hunting with a dwarven companion when they were caught in the storm, and separated. The three head towards Moria, soon finding the dwarf, Hadhod (Lewis MacLeod), whom they save from a Cave Troll. They fight the Watcher in the Water shortly after it failed to kill the Fellowship.

Upon entering Moria, they fight the Watcher again, and this time they kill it. Hadhod learns the rumors regarding Balin and the dwarves are true; they have been wiped out by orcs. They pursue the Fellowship, finding themselves on the floor below them, and seeing a Balrog ascending from the depths. After fighting countless wargs, goblins, and 9 Trolls, they reach the Bridge of Khazad-dûm. There they join Gandalf (Ian McKellen) as he faces the Balrog. They help him to victory, but are unable to prevent him falling from the bridge. However, unbeknownst to the Fellowship, Gandalf is resurrected by the Valar. Meanwhile, the party exits Moria and follows in the footsteps of the Fellowship, passing through Lothlórien.

They soon learn that Boromir is dead, that Frodo and Sam have headed towards Mordor to destroy the Ring, and that the rest of the Fellowship have gone to Rohan. They too head towards Rohan. However, Saruman has used his agent, Gríma Wormtongue, to corrupt Théoden, King of Rohan, manipulating him into banishing Éomer, captain of the Rohirrim. Saruman plans to use the division caused by this to destroy Rohan. The party meet the resurrected Gandalf, who tells them they must assemble Éomer's men and head towards Helm's Deep, where Rohan will make a last stand against Saruman's army. In the meantime, Gandalf will attempt to release Théoden from Saruman's curse. Soon thereafter, they meet a woman named Morwen (Lori Phillips), who joins the party on the road to Helm's Deep in the hopes of finding her family. Having assembled Éomer's scattered forces, the party begin to make their way to Helm's Deep. On the journey, Morwen reveals she is originally from Minas Tirith, and the party receive word that Théoden has been released from Saruman's spell. On the road, they meet Éaoden (Charles Martinet), a member of Rohan's Royal Guard, who joins them. Soon thereafter, they find the bodies of Morwen's family, killed by wargs, before arriving at Helm's Deep.

Inside the fortress, they prepare for battle. Soon, Saruman's army of 10,000 Uruk-hai arrive. They breach the outer walls using explosives and overwhelm the inner defenses. As Berethor fights, he suddenly hears the voice of Saruman telling him he shall be punished for his betrayal. Gandalf and Éomer arrive with the Rohirrim, attacking and decimating the Uruk-hai army. Meanwhile, the Ents, roused to war by Saruman's partial destruction of Fangorn Forest, lay siege to Orthanc, ending Saruman's involvement in the war. Gandalf then explains to Berethor why he heard the voice of Saruman – Berethor was captured by Saruman, who put him under a spell. Saruman believed Boromir would take the Ring from Frodo, and Berethor's job was to take it from Boromir and return it to Saruman. However, Boromir did not take the Ring. Knowing of Saruman's plan, Gandalf and Galadriel sent Idrial to find Berethor and stay by him until the spell could be broken, and with the destruction of Orthanc, Berethor is freed from the spell.

Gandalf tells the party that Sauron will now turn his eye to Minas Tirith. Gandalf rides on ahead, and sends the party to the ruined city of Osgiliath, to stand alongside Boromir's brother, Faramir. As they await the arrival of the army, Berethor muses that Osgiliath seems familiar to him. Éoaden remembers a Gondorian warrior who fought under Boromir during the defense of the city some time ago, but who fled the battle in fear. The party realize that Berethor is that man. He vows he will never flee again, and the party join Faramir in a fight against Gothmog. They defeat him, but he flees before they can kill him. Gandalf then summons the party back to Minas Tirith. Before they leave, however, Berethor learns the reason he fled Osgiliath was because he was stabbed by a Morgul blade, the tip of which is still within him. He and Idrial face the Witch-king, but Idrial explains he cannot harm the Witch-king whilst the blade is still inside him. He cuts it out and they attack the Witch-king, driving him off. The party then head to Minas Tirith.

They reach the city just after the Mordor army has breached the main gate, with orcs rampaging through the streets. Meanwhile, the Witch-king confronts Gandalf, who is joined by the party in the fight. During the battle, they hear the horns of the Rohirrim, and the Witch-king flees. The party head to the citadel at the top of the city, where they witness the death of the insane Denethor at the hands of Gandalf. They then learn that Aragorn is on his way with the Army of the Dead. The battle moves to the Pelennor Fields as the Rohirrim charge the Mordor army. The Witch-king attacks Théoden, and Éowyn comes to his aid. The party join her as she fights and they are able to defeat him. Soon thereafter Aragorn arrives with the Army of the Dead, who wipe out the Mordor army.

As the party celebrate, the eight remaining Nazgûl attack, stabbing Morwen. They defeat the Nazgûl, and Aragorn is able to save Morwen's life. He then tells the party the entire army is to march on the Black Gate to distract Sauron from Frodo's approach to Mount Doom. At the same time, the party attack the Eye of Sauron itself. As they fight, Frodo successfully destroys the Ring, and Sauron is defeated. In the aftermath of the victory, Gandalf tells Berethor he will face more adventures, saying "Your tale has hardly begun."

== Development ==
Electronic Arts first mentioned The Third Age as early as October 4, 2002, shortly before the PlayStation 2 launch of The Two Towers. EA announced they would be making a Return of the King video game, to be released in roughly twelve months time, as well as an as-yet untitled role-playing game based on all three films, slated for release in Fall 2004. Nothing more was heard about the game until April 27, 2004 when EA officially revealed the game was to be released on three current generation consoles (GameCube, PlayStation 2 and Xbox), as well as the Game Boy Advance. They explained that rather than the hack and slash nature of the previous two games in the franchise, The Third Age, as it was now officially called, would be a turn-based RPG, with gameplay similar to that of Final Fantasy X and Final Fantasy X-2. They also revealed the game would be set in the world of the films, but the player would control new characters rather than existing characters already established, although key events in the films would appear in the game, thus allowing players to see familiar events from a new perspective. Additionally, the game would feature new missions, events and characters not taken from the films at all. They also mentioned that the game would feature an option to allow players to fight on the side of Sauron.

"Once we started work on The Third Age and knew that it would be a role-playing game, we began brainstorming on the most interesting way to tell the story that we all know and love while giving players a major role in the events. It's a delicate balance. You are playing as player-created characters who need to find their way through Middle-earth and participate in the story in interesting and meaningful ways, building and experiencing a story wrapped around the thrilling events of the New Line Cinema films. You travel on a sort of 'S' curve that weaves in and out of the path of the Fellowship through the story of the trilogy. At times you'll be behind or 'next to' them; at other times you'll be in the same time and place as members of the Fellowship."

— Steve Gray; executive producer

Development of the game had begun in mid-2002, when The Two Towers was still in development. Work intensified towards the end of 2003, with the release of The Return of the King. Executive producer, Steve Gray, who had worked on Final Fantasy VII and Parasite Eve for Squaresoft, explained he had wanted to make a Lord of the Rings RPG since the 1990s, but had never gotten the chance, until EA acquired the rights to the film trilogy.

As the game was under development, various ideas were rejected as the team settled on an approach. For example, initially, the developers planned to have an Active Time Battle combat system, before going with the Conditional Time Battle system. Another rejected idea was an auto-equip for weapons and armor, which would automatically equip the strongest piece of equipment. In tandem with this was an auto-allocation of experience points, whereby the game would choose to distribute points among the various attributes. Another rejected idea was that in Evil Mode, the good characters against whom the player would be fighting would replicate the actions taken by the player when they had played through the main game; the player's actions during the main game would be replicated by the AI controlled party. Eventually, however, this idea was scrapped and Evil Mode was simplified.

The game was first shown at the E3 event in May 2004, when a playable demo was made available for all three consoles. The demo featured gameplay from Moria, and included a fight against two trolls and the battle against the Balrog, as well as some footage from the film. EA announced the game would be about five times as long as the Return of the King game. They also explained that although the game would be linear, and the player would not be free to go wherever they wished in Middle-earth, at most times during the game, optional side quests would be available. The game would be divided into smaller chapters comprising three main story arcs; the journey from Rivendell through Moria to Lothlórien; the journey across Rohan to Helm's Deep, and the subsequent Battle of the Hornburg; and the journey from Helm's Deep to Minas Tirith, and the subsequent Battle of the Pelennor Fields. EA explained players would be given already developed characters, but customization and attributes would not be tied to character classes, so players would be free to have any character specialize in any mode of combat they wished. Each of the characters in the game was based upon a minor character or extra who appeared at some point in the films, and who was named by the production crew but never named on-screen.

== Reception ==
Reception

Aggregate score
Aggregator	Score		
Aggregator	GameCube	PS2	Xbox
Metacritic	74/100	73/100	75/100

Review scores
Publication	Score		
Publication	GameCube	PS2	Xbox
Eurogamer			7/10
GameSpot	7.7/10	7.7/10	7.7/10
GameSpy	3.5/5	3.5/5	3.5/5
IGN	8.5/10	8.5/10	8.5/10
Nintendo Power	3.4/5		
Official U.S. PlayStation Magazine		2/5	
Official Xbox Magazine (US)			6.8/10

The Lord of the Rings: The Third Age received "mixed or average reviews" except for the Xbox version, which received "generally favorable reviews", according to Metacritic. The game was widely praised for its graphics and visuals. (Note: Attributed to multiple references:)

Eurogamer's Patrick Garratt scored the Xbox version 7 out of 10. Comparing the combat system to Final Fantasy X, he wrote "it's a great formula [...] but there's nowhere near the depth". However, he praised the combat sequences and the story ("the story itself is actually very cool, and for LOTR fans the game will be a must-have for this alone. As the story is completely fresh and sits alongside the timeline of the films, playing The Third Age engenders the genuine excitement of playing pen and paper RPGs like Middle Earth"). He concluded "The Third Age is a highly enjoyable, if throwaway foray into the world of the Lord of the Rings films, and has much to recommend it for a casual purchase, especially for Tolkien completists. But RPG mentalists will be bitter from the outset and will care little for the unparalleled presentation [...] This is a good game, it's just too shallow; an entry-level RPG at heart."

GameSpy's Raymond Padilla the game 3.5 out of 5, calling it "a very solid RPG that dazzles in some places and disappoints in others". His biggest criticism was the plot and the characters; "I don't care about the characters. I never really gave a damn if they lived or died as I was playing the game. I felt like I was given the minor league version of The Fellowship, with archetypes of characters I knew [...] Their names and stories seemed so irrelevant and uninteresting compared to the real thing." However, he described the game as "a phenomenal re-creation of Middle-earth that fans will totally drool over". He concluded "there are better RPGs on the market. There are better TLotR games on the market too. If you've exhausted all those possibilities, then give The Third Age a shot."

GameSpot's Bethany Massimilla scored the game 7.7 out of 10. She was critical of the amount of Epic Scenes (which show clips from the films) in proportion to actual cutscenes; "there's so much exposition being done by Gandalf that it seems to come at the expense of your characters [...] you are explicitly told what has happened and what will happen instead of actually seeing it happen, and it serves to somewhat distance the player from the whole experience". She concluded, "The Lord of the Rings: The Third Age molds Middle-earth into a traditional turn-based frame, and while the results aren't all that great, the game carries some pretty good features and should appeal to fans of the source material."

IGN's Juan Castro scored the game 8.5 out of 10. He praised EA because he thought they "did a magnificent job of bringing the grandeur of Middle-earth into The Third Age". On the other hand, he was critical of the difficulty, claiming "from the moment they brandish a weapon in-game, RPG veterans will most likely tell that EA went to great lengths to make The Third Age as accessible as possible". He also criticized the story, writing "gamers will be hard pressed to find an ounce of character development throughout the entire adventure", and calling the characters "soulless archetypes". However, he concluded "For the most part, The Third Age rips gamers from their living rooms and dumps them in a detailed rendition of Middle-earth. EA Redwood Shores has faithfully recreated everything from the glowing majesty of Rivendell to the murky depths of Helm's Deep. Suffice to say, this is one of the best looking games based on Tolkien's classic trilogy. But, as gamers everywhere know, looks aren't everything. It's one thing to have video games look as good as the movies they're based on, but what good is any of it if the actual gameplay isn't enough to keep you playing. Thankfully, this combat heavy RPG delivers the goods, although some die hard RPG fans may be put off by its overly streamlined approach."

=== Sales ===
According to Electronic Arts, The Third Age was a commercial success, with sales above 1 million units worldwide by the end of 2004.
