= The Incredible Hulk (film) =

2008 Marvel Studios film

- Theatrical release poster
- Directed by: Louis Leterrier
- Written by: Zak Penn
- Based on: Hulk by: Stan Lee; Jack Kirby
- Produced by: Avi Arad; Gale Anne Hurd; Kevin Feige
- Starring: Edward Norton; Liv Tyler; Tim Roth; William Hurt; Tim Blake Nelson; Ty Burrell; Christina Cabot
- Cinematography: Peter Menzies Jr.
- Edited by: John Wright; Rick Shaine; Vincent Tabaillon
- Music by: Craig Armstrong
- Production companies: Marvel Studios; Valhalla Motion Pictures
- Distributed by: Universal Pictures (Note: In June 2023, the film's distribution rights were transferred from Universal Pictures to Walt Disney Studios Motion Pictures.)
- Release dates: June 8, 2008 (Gibson Amphitheatre); June 13, 2008 (United States)
- Running time: 112 minutes
- Country: United States
- Language: English
- Budget: $150 million
- Box office: $265 million

The Incredible Hulk is a 2008 American superhero film based on the Marvel Comics character the Hulk. Produced by Marvel Studios and Valhalla Motion Pictures, and distributed by Universal Pictures, it is the second film in the Marvel Cinematic Universe (MCU). It was directed by Louis Leterrier from a screenplay by Zak Penn, and stars Edward Norton as Bruce Banner alongside Liv Tyler, Tim Roth, William Hurt, Tim Blake Nelson, Ty Burrell, and Christina Cabot. In the film, Banner becomes the monstrous Hulk as an unwitting pawn in a military scheme to reinvigorate the "super soldier" program through gamma radiation. He goes on the run from the military while attempting to cure himself of the Hulk.

After the mixed reception to Universal's 2003 film Hulk, Marvel Studios reacquired the rights to the character, though Universal retained distribution rights. Leterrier was hired to direct, and Penn wrote a script that was closer to the comics and the 1978–1982 television series. In April 2007, Norton was hired to portray Banner and to rewrite Penn's screenplay. His script positioned the film as a reboot of the series, distancing it from the 2003 film to give the new version its own identity. Norton was ultimately not credited for his writing. Filming took place from July to November 2007, primarily in Toronto, with additional filming in New York City and Rio de Janeiro. Over 700 visual effects shots were created in post-production using a combination of motion capture and computer-generated imagery. Norton and Marvel Studios had various disagreements during production, including over the final edit.

The Incredible Hulk premiered at the Gibson Amphitheatre in Universal City, California, on June 8, 2008, and was released in the United States on June 13 as part of Phase One of the MCU. It was deemed a moderate success, grossing $265 million and receiving slightly better reviews than the 2003 film. A sequel was discussed but has never materialized, in part due to rights issues with Universal. Mark Ruffalo took over from Norton as Banner for subsequent MCU appearances, starting with the crossover film The Avengers in 2012.

== Plot ==
At Culver University in Virginia, U.S. military general Thaddeus Ross meets with Dr. Bruce Banner, the colleague and boyfriend of his daughter Betty, regarding an experiment that Ross claims is meant to make humans immune to gamma radiation. This is part of Ross's attempts to recreate a World War II-era "super soldier" program. The experiment fails, and Banner is exposed to high levels of gamma radiation, causing him to transform into the Hulk if enraged or if his heart rate rises above 200 beats per minute. The Hulk destroys the lab and injures the general, Betty, and others outside. Banner becomes a fugitive from Ross, who wants to weaponize the Hulk.

Five years later, (Note: Director Louis Leterrier said the film takes place about five years since Banner first transformed. The 2023 book The Marvel Cinematic Universe: An Official Timeline confirms this, and places the majority of the film in early 2010, simultaneously with the events of the films Iron Man 2 (2010) and Thor (2011).) Banner works at a bottling factory in Rio de Janeiro, Brazil, and has not transformed in five months. He trains in yoga and breathing techniques while collaborating anonymously with an internet user called "Mr. Blue" in his search to cure his condition. After Banner accidentally cuts his finger, a drop of his blood falls into a bottle of soda, which is eventually ingested by an elderly consumer in Milwaukee, Wisconsin, giving him gamma sickness. Using the bottle to track Banner, Ross sends a special forces team led by Emil Blonsky to capture him. Banner transforms into the Hulk and defeats Blonsky's team, though Blonsky survives. After Ross explains how Banner became the Hulk, Blonsky agrees to be injected with a similar serum, gaining enhanced speed, strength, and agility.

Banner returns to Culver University and reunites with Betty. Her new boyfriend, Dr. Leonard Samson, contacts Ross, who soon arrives with his forces and Blonsky. They attack Banner at the university, and he transforms into the Hulk again. Blonsky, whose judgment is impaired by the serum, attacks and mocks the Hulk. The Hulk severely injures Blonsky, but the serum allows him to heal quickly. Betty is almost killed by military fire and is saved by the Hulk, who flees with Betty and eventually reverts to Banner. The pair go on the run, and Banner contacts Mr. Blue, who urges them to meet him in New York City. Mr. Blue is cellular biologist Dr. Samuel Sterns, who has developed a possible antidote to Banner's condition. After a seemingly successful test, he warns Banner that the antidote may only reverse an initial transformation. Sterns reveals that he has synthesized Banner's blood samples, which Banner sent from Brazil, into a large supply, and wants to apply its "limitless potential" to medicine. Fearful of the Hulk's power falling into the wrong hands, Banner wants to destroy the supply.

Blonsky and Ross's forces take Banner into custody. As Banner and Betty are taken away in a helicopter, Blonsky stays behind and orders Sterns to inject him with Banner's blood, as he covets the Hulk's power. The experiment mutates Blonsky into the Abomination, a monstrous creature that surpasses the Hulk in size and strength. He attacks Sterns, who gets some of Banner's blood in a cut on his forehead and begins mutating as well. The Abomination rampages through Harlem. Realizing that the Hulk is the only one who can stop the Abomination, Banner convinces Ross to release him. He jumps from Ross's helicopter and transforms after hitting the ground. The Hulk battles and defeats the Abomination by nearly strangling him to death with a chain, but spares his life upon hearing Betty's plea. The Hulk leaves the Abomination for Ross and his forces to arrest and flees New York.

A month later, Banner is in Bella Coola, British Columbia, where he practices controlling his transformation. Sometime later, Tony Stark approaches Ross at a bar and informs him that a team is being put together. (Note: The team was identified offscreen as the Avengers)

== Cast ==
- Edward Norton as Bruce Banner:
  A nuclear physicist and biochemist at Culver University who, because of exposure to gamma radiation, transforms into an enormous green humanoid monster when enraged or agitated. David Duchovny was a front-runner for the film before Norton's casting, while director Louis Leterrier's original choice was Mark Ruffalo, who would later play Banner in future Marvel Cinematic Universe (MCU) films. Producer Gale Anne Hurd recalled the duality of Norton's performances in the films Primal Fear (1996) and Fight Club (1999), while Norton reminded producer Kevin Feige of Bill Bixby, who played Banner in the 1978–1982 television series. Lou Ferrigno, who played the Hulk in that series, said Norton "has a similar physique [and a] similar personality" to Bixby. Norton was a Hulk fan, citing the early comic books, the Bixby series, and Bruce Jones's run on the comics as his favorite depictions of the character. He had expressed interest in the role for the previous film, Hulk (2003), and was initially reluctant to take on the part after that film had strayed from the fugitive story that he associated with the character. He was won over by the vision of Leterrier and Marvel Studios and believed they were looking to him to guide the project. Norton subsequently rewrote the script. Leterrier praised Norton for bringing gravitas to the script, and said they were both approaching superheroes as "the new Greek gods". Norton was particularly drawn to the Greek myth of Prometheus for the character.
  - Lou Ferrigno voices the Hulk. During the 2008 New York Comic Con, Leterrier publicly offered Ferrigno the role. This marks the third time Ferrigno portrayed the Hulk, having also voiced the character in the 1996–97 animated series. Originally, the Hulk's only line was "Betty" at the film's ending, which would have been his first word. Leterrier was aware that fans wanted him to speak normally and added "Leave me alone!" and "Hulk smash!". The latter line received cheers during a screening Leterrier attended. Ferrigno also has a cameo appearance in the film as a security guard whom Banner bribes with a pizza.
- Liv Tyler as Betty Ross:
  A cellular biologist and Bruce's former girlfriend, from whom he is separated as a result of his condition. Tyler was attracted to the love story in the script and was a fan of the Bixby series because of the "humanity and what [Banner] is going through". She was called about the role while driving home and accepted the part after a day, without reading the script. Tyler and Norton spent hours discussing Bruce and Betty's life before he became the Hulk. She said filming the part was physical and fun, and compared her performance to "a deer caught in the headlights" because of Betty's shock at Bruce's unexpected return into her life.
- Tim Roth as Emil Blonsky / Abomination:
  A Russian-born officer in the United Kingdom's Royal Marines Commandos who is loaned to General Ross. Lusting for the Hulk's power, Blonsky is injected with various serums that transform him into a near-skeletal humanoid monster as strong as the Hulk himself. Roth said he took the part to please his sons, who are comic-book superhero fans, and because he found Leterrier's ideas "very dark and very interesting". Roth was a fan of the Bixby series as a teenager. He started watching the 2003 film to prepare for the part, but stopped as he did not want to compare himself to it. It was Roth who suggested Blonsky be a soldier rather than a KGB agent as in the comics. Leterrier was a fan of Roth's work and felt it was "great watching a normal Cockney boy become a superhero", but Marvel and Norton were initially reluctant to cast him. Before he was cast in the film Punisher: War Zone (2008), Ray Stevenson was in discussions for the role. Roth trained with gun and military experts in preparation for the role, but it did not work out due to Blonsky's aging. This made it difficult to film some stunts, including being pulled by a harness to show Blonsky's enhanced 30–40 mile-per-hour running speed. Cyril Raffaelli performed some of his stunts. Roth enjoyed the motion capture for Abomination, which reminded him of fringe theatre. He worked with Terry Notary, his trainer from the film Planet of the Apes (2001), on the monster's movement. Roth was signed on for three more films.
- William Hurt as Thaddeus Ross:
  Betty's father and a U.S. Army general who has dedicated his life to capturing the Hulk. Leterrier cast Hurt because "Ross is more physical, more explosive in this movie, and no actor goes from zero to 100 as well as William". He compared Ross to Captain Ahab. The Hulk was Hurt's favorite superhero, and his son is also a big fan of the character. Hurt found production very different from the typical "pure anxiety" of a studio film, finding it more akin to an independent film. He described Ross as "humiliated by Hulk's conscience: he actually sees and recognizes that it's more developed than his own, even though he's a patriot and a warrior for his country. He's sacrificed [much] for that purpose, but at the expense at times of his humanity—which he occasionally recovers." In June 2015, when reflecting on how his reprisal in the MCU film Captain America: Civil War (2016) was different from this film, Hurt said, "What I created [for The Incredible Hulk] was a Ross who was right out of the graphic novel type of thing, where he was as much of a cartoon, in a way, as the monsters were. His ego was just as big and his problems were just as big. I really did do that consciously. I created a General Ross before which created a verisimilitude for the monsters, by making him a human monster. I worked really hard on the makeup and the exaggerated behavior and things like that and a controlled psychosis." Sam Elliott had expressed interest in reprising the role from the 2003 film before Hurt was cast.
- Tim Blake Nelson as Samuel Sterns:
  A cellular biologist who develops a possible antidote to Banner's condition. Towards the end of the film, Sterns is exposed to a substance that begins his transformation into the comic book villain "The Leader".
- Ty Burrell as Leonard Samson:
  A psychiatrist who is in a relationship with Betty during Bruce's absence. Burrell had performed with Norton in the off Broadway play Burn This in 2003, and when Leterrier met him, he recognized Burrell as the "jerk" from the 2004 Dawn of the Dead remake, which was how Samson was characterized in the script before Norton rewrote it.
- Christina Cabot as Kathleen Sparr: A U.S. Army major who is General Ross's personal aide

Robert Downey Jr. makes an uncredited cameo appearance as Tony Stark at the end of the film, reprising his role from the MCU film Iron Man (2008). Downey appeared as a favor to Marvel Studios and was frustrated about being constantly asked about his short cameo while promoting Iron Man. He acknowledged that this was a smart move on Marvel's part, bringing more attention to The Incredible Hulk. Hulk co-creator Stan Lee cameos as a man who becomes ill when drinking soda that is poisoned with Banner's blood. Paul Soles, who voiced Banner in the 1966 The Marvel Super Heroes animated series, appears as kindly pizzeria owner Stanley Lieber, who was friends with Banner and Betty in the past. His name is a reference to Stan Lee's full name. P. J. Kerr and Nicholas Rose portray respective Culver University students Jim Wilson and Jack McGee. Other small roles include: Brazilian Jiu-Jitsu artist Rickson Gracie as Bruce Banner's martial arts instructor, credited as an Aikido instructor due to Norton's background with that style; Brazilian actress Débora Nascimento as Martina, Banner's colleague at a beverage factory; Michael K. Williams as a Harlem bystander, a role that was written for him by Norton as a fan of Williams's series The Wire (2002–2008); and Peter Mensah as General Joe Greller, one of Ross's military friends. Additionally, Martin Starr plays a college student who is credited as "Computer Nerd". In May 2019, Feige said this character had been retroactively named Roger Harrington, which is Starr's role in the MCU films Spider-Man: Homecoming (2017), Spider-Man: Far From Home (2019), and Spider-Man: No Way Home (2021).

== Production ==
=== Development ===
The writers of the film were influenced by the TV series of the same name. Example shown above: Norton (top) sitting in a more modern version of the machine Bill Bixby (below) sat in.

After the release of Ang Lee's Hulk, screenwriter James Schamus was planning a sequel which would continue the story featuring the Grey Hulk. He was also considering the Leader and the Abomination as villains. Marvel wanted the Abomination because he would be an actual threat to the Hulk, unlike General Ross. During the filming of Hulk, producer Avi Arad had a target May 2005 theatrical release date. On January 18, 2006, Arad confirmed Marvel Studios would be providing the money for The Incredible Hulk's production budget, with Universal distributing, because Universal did not meet the deadline for filming a sequel. Producer Gale Anne Hurd's Valhalla Motion Pictures also served as a production company for the film. Marvel felt it would be better to deviate from Ang Lee's style to continue the franchise, arguing his film was like a parallel universe one-shot comic book, and their next film needed to be, in Kevin Feige's words, "really starting the Marvel Hulk franchise". Hurd also felt the film had to meet what "everyone expects to see from having read the comics and seen the TV series".

=== Pre-production ===
Louis Leterrier, who enjoyed the TV series as a child and liked the first film, had expressed interest in directing the Iron Man film adaptation. Jon Favreau had taken that project, so Marvel offered him the Hulk. Leterrier was reluctant because he was unsure whether he could replicate Lee's style, but Marvel explained that it was not their intent. Leterrier's primary inspiration was Jeph Loeb and Tim Sale's Hulk: Gray (a retelling of the character's first appearance). He replicated every comic book panel he pinned up during pre-production, from the many comics he browsed, in the final film. Leterrier said that he planned to show Bruce Banner's struggle with the monster within him, while Feige added the film would explore "that element of wish fulfillment, of overcoming an injustice or a bully and tapping into a strength that you didn't quite realize you had in yourself". Arad also said the film would be "a lot more of a love story between Bruce Banner and Betty Ross". In May 2006, Arad left Marvel Studios to become an independent producer. Because he was on staff when the deal was made for The Incredible Hulk, he retained producer credit on the film.

Zak Penn, who wrote a draft of the first film in 1996, said the film would follow up Hulk, but stressed it would be more tonally similar to the TV show and Bruce Jones' run on the comic. He compared his script to Aliens, which was very different from Alien, but still in the same continuity. He included two scenes from his 1996 script: Banner jumping from a helicopter to trigger a transformation, and realizing he is unable to have sex with Betty. After the studio rejected a treatment by another screenwriter in 2006, Penn wrote three drafts before departing in early 2007 to promote his film The Grand. Edward Norton began discussions to play Banner in April 2006, and arranged a deal that included him as both an actor and a writer, with a screenplay draft he was contractually obligated to turn in within a month. He did so and continued to polish his draft as late as halfway through principal photography. In November 2006, a June 13, 2008, release date was set. Leterrier acknowledged the only remaining similarity between the two films was Bruce Banner hiding in South America, and that the film was a unique reboot, as generally audiences would have expected another forty-minute origin story. There were previous discussions to set the first act in Thailand. Leterrier felt audiences were left restless waiting for the character to arrive in Ang Lee's film. Feige commented, "we didn't want to tell the origin story again, because we thought people were so familiar with it, which is why we didn't tell that... One reason we made Incredible Hulk was to get Hulk into the [Marvel Cinematic Universe] canon." The end of the film occurs at Columbia University, and Leterrier was interested in naming it Empire State University, as a reference to Peter Parker, but was unable to since Sony Pictures controls the film rights of Spider-Man.

Shortly after the release of The Incredible Hulk, Gale Anne Hurd commented on the uncertainty of its relationship with Ang Lee's Hulk film. "We couldn't quite figure out how to term this ... It's kind of a reboot and it's kind of sequel." Hurd said that "requel", a portmanteau of "reboot" and "sequel", was a "perfect" description for the film. Feige clarified that the two films are not connected, noting how events shown in the opening credits sequence of The Incredible Hulk contradict Hulk. Norton explained his decision to ignore Lee's origin story: "I don't even like the phrase 'origin story', and I don't think in great literature and great films that explaining the roots of the story doesn't mean it comes in the beginning." "Audiences know this story," he added, "[so] deal with it artfully." He wanted to "have revelations even in the third act about what set this whole thing in motion". The new origin story references Ultimate Marvel's take on the Hulk, which also had him created in an attempt to make super soldiers. Norton removed Rick Jones and toned down S.H.I.E.L.D.'s presence. He also added the scene where Banner attempts to extract a cure from a flower and his e-mailing with Samuel Sterns, which references Bruce Jones' story. Norton rewrote scenes every day. Ultimately, the Writers Guild of America decided to credit the script solely to Penn, who argued Norton had not dramatically changed his script. Journalist Anne Thompson explained "The Guild tends to favor plot, structure and pre-existing characters over dialogue." Penn said in 2008, "I wasn't happy with [Norton] coming to Comic-Con saying that he wrote the script." Before either Penn or Norton joined the project, an anonymous screenwriter wrote a draft and lobbied for credit.

=== Filming ===
Leterrier had to direct four units with a broken foot. Filming began on July 9, 2007. Shooting primarily took place in Toronto, because mayor David Miller was a Hulk fan and promised to be helpful to the crew when closing Yonge Street for four nights in September to shoot Hulk and Blonsky's climactic fight. Despite messing up the street with explosives and overturned burning vehicles, the crew would clean it up within twenty minutes so business could continue as normal each day. The first action sequence shot was the Culver University battle, which was filmed at the University of Toronto and Morningside Park. The filmmakers built a glass wall over a walkway at the university for when the soldiers trap Banner inside to smoke him out. There was also shooting in the Financial District. A factory in Hamilton, Ontario, which was due for demolition, was the interior of the Brazilian factory. The site's underground floors were used for Ross's military command center. The crew also shot part of the Hulk and Blonsky's fight on a backlot in Hamilton. Other Canadian locations included military base CFB Trenton and a glacier in Bella Coola, British Columbia. Afterwards, there was a week-long shoot in New York City and two weeks in Rio de Janeiro. While there, the crew shot at Rocinha, Lapa, Tijuca Forest, and Santa Teresa. Filming concluded in November after 88 days.

The Incredible Hulk joined Toronto's Green-Screen initiative, to help cut carbon emissions and waste created during filming. Producer Gale Anne Hurd acknowledged the Hulk, being green, was a popular environmental analogy, and Norton himself is an environmentalist. Hybrid and fuel-efficient vehicles were used, with low-sulfur diesel as their energy source. The construction department used sustainably harvested, locally sourced yellow pine instead of lauan for the sets, and also used zero- or low-VOC paint. The wood was generally recycled or given to environmental organizations, and paint cans were handed to waste management. In addition, they used cloth bags, biodegradable food containers, china and silverware food utensils, a stainless steel mug for each production crew member, a contractor who removed bins, recycled paper, biodegradable soap and cleaners in the trailers and production offices, and the sound department used rechargeable batteries. It became the first blockbuster film to receive the Environmental Media Association's Green Seal, which is displayed during the end credits.

=== Post-production ===
==== Editing ====
Seventy minutes of footage, mostly dealing with the origin, were not included in the final cut. Much of this backstory was unscripted, and the filmmakers were never sure of including it in the final cut, and had considered releasing some of these clips on the internet. Editor Kyle Cooper, creator of the Marvel logo (with the flipping pages) and the montage detailing Iron Man's biography in that film, edited together much of this footage into the opening credits. Leterrier explained that a negative test screening, where flashbacks were placed across the film that the audience found too similar to Hulk, had resulted in compressing these to the film's start. This replaced the original opening, where Banner comes to the Arctic to commit suicide. When the scene ends, the frozen body of Captain America is partially seen in the ice for a moment. Leterrier said he did not want this scene to be lost amid the opening montage. Associate producer Stephen Broussard opined that the scene worked, but the test audience reaction led the filmmakers to open with Bruce Banner living in Brazil after recapping his origin story.

Norton and Leterrier disputed with the producers over the final running time: they wanted it to be near 135 minutes, while the producers wanted the film to be under two hours. This was made public, and rumors spread that Norton "made it clear he won't cooperate with publicity plans if he's not happy with the final product". Norton dismissed this: "Our healthy process [of collaboration], which is and should be a private matter, was misrepresented publicly as a 'dispute', seized on by people looking for a good story, and has been distorted to such a degree that it risks distracting from the film itself, which Marvel, Universal and I refuse to let happen. It has always been my firm conviction that films should speak for themselves and that knowing too much about how they are made diminishes the magic of watching them."

==== Visual effects ====
Leterrier's finished redesign of the Abomination

Leterrier cited Andy Serkis's motion capture portrayals of Gollum and King Kong in The Lord of the Rings and King Kong, respectively, as the standard he was aiming for with the Hulk and Abomination. Norton and Roth filmed 2500 takes of different movements the monsters would make, such as the Hulk's "thunder claps". Phosphorescent face paint applied to the actors' faces and strobe lighting would help record the most subtle mannerisms into the computer. Others, including Cyril Raffaelli, provided motion capture for stunts and fights, after the main actors had done video referencing. Leterrier hired Rhythm & Hues Studios to provide the computer-generated imagery (CGI), rather than Industrial Light & Magic (ILM) who created the visual effects for Ang Lee's Hulk. Visual effects company Image Engine spent over a year working on a shot where Banner's gamma-irradiated blood falls through three factory floors into a bottle. 700 effects shots were created for the film. Motion capture aided in placing and timing of movements, but key frame animation by Rhythm and Hues provided the necessary "finesse [and] superhero quality". Many of the animators and Leterrier himself provided video reference for the climactic fight.

Dale Keown's comic book artwork of the Hulk was an inspiration for his design. Leterrier felt the first Hulk had "too much fat [and] the proportions were a little off". He explained, "The Hulk is beyond perfect so there is zero grams of fat, all chiseled, and his muscle and strength defines this creature so he's like a tank." Visual effects supervisor Kurt Williams envisioned the Hulk's physique as a linebacker rather than a bodybuilder. A height of nine feet was chosen for the character as they did not want him to be too inhuman. To make him more expressive, computer programs controlling the inflation of his muscles and saturation of skin color were created. Williams cited flushing as an example of humans' skin color being influenced by their emotions. The animators felt green blood would make his skin become darker rather than lighter, and his skin tones, depending on lighting, either resemble an olive or even gray slate. His animation model was completed without the effects company's full knowledge of what he would be required to do: he was rigged to do whatever they imagined, in case the model was to be used for The Avengers film. The Hulk's medium-length hair was modeled on Mike Deodato's art. He originally had a crew cut, but Leterrier decided flopping hair imbued him with more character. Leterrier cited An American Werewolf in London as the inspiration for Banner's transformation, wanting to show how painful it was for him to change. As a nod to the live-action TV series, Banner's eyes change color first when he transforms. Leterrier changed the Abomination's design from the comics because he felt the audience would question why he resembled a fish or a reptile, instead of "an über-human" like the Hulk. Rather, his hideousness is derived from being injected multiple times into his skin, muscles, and bones, creating a creature with a protruding spine and sharp bones that he can use to stab. His green skin is pale and reflects light, so it appears orange because of the surrounding fire during the climactic battle. The motion capture performers, including Roth, tried to make the character behave less gracefully than the Hulk. They modeled his posture and the way he turns his head on a shark. The character also shares Roth's tattoos. A height of eleven feet was chosen for the character. Leterrier tried to work in the character's pointed ears, but realized the Hulk would bite them off (using the example of Mike Tyson when he fought Evander Holyfield), and felt ignoring that would make the Hulk come across as stupid.

Leterrier had planned to use prosthetic makeup and animatronics to complement the computer-generated imagery that was solely used in the previous film. The make-up artists who worked on X-Men: The Last Stand were set to portray Blonsky's gradual transformation, which Zak Penn said would portray Blonsky "not [being] used to having these properties. Like he's much heavier, and we talked about how when he walks down the sidewalk, his weight destroys the sidewalk and he's tripping. [It's all about] the humanization of these kinds of superhero characters, showing the effects physics may actually have on [them]." Tom Woodruff Jr. of Amalgamated Dynamics (who created all the costumes for the Alien films since Alien 3) was in negotiations and created two busts of the Hulk and prosthetic hands to act as stand-ins for the character. A full animatronic was never created as it was decided it would complicate production to set up shots for a puppet and then a computer graphic. An animatronic was used for Sterns' mutating head, however. Destruction was mostly done practically. A model of a bottling machine was smashed through a wall for when the Hulk escapes the factory. The filmmakers used steam and dry ice for the gas used to smoke out the Hulk, and they destroyed a real Humvee by dropping a weight on it when shooting the Culver University battle. Pipes blew fire for when the Hulk strikes down the computer-generated helicopter. When Banner falls from the helicopter to trigger the Hulk into fighting the Abomination, Norton was attached to a surface held by a bar which turned 90 degrees while the camera was pulled to the ceiling to simulate falling. Leterrier jokingly remarked that making Norton fall that distance would render him unable to act.

== Music ==
The score for the film was composed by Craig Armstrong, who was the arranger for Massive Attack, a band Leterrier was fond of and had collaborated with on the 2005 film Unleashed. Armstrong was his first choice, which surprised Marvel, not knowing if he had scored an action film (he did compose 2001's Kiss of the Dragon). At Leterrier's suggestion, the soundtrack was released on a two-disc album, which Armstrong thought was a joke until he compiled the album and Marvel asked him why they were given only one disc. The film's score includes a reference to Joe Harnell's theme "The Lonely Man" from the 1978 Incredible Hulk television series.

== Marketing ==
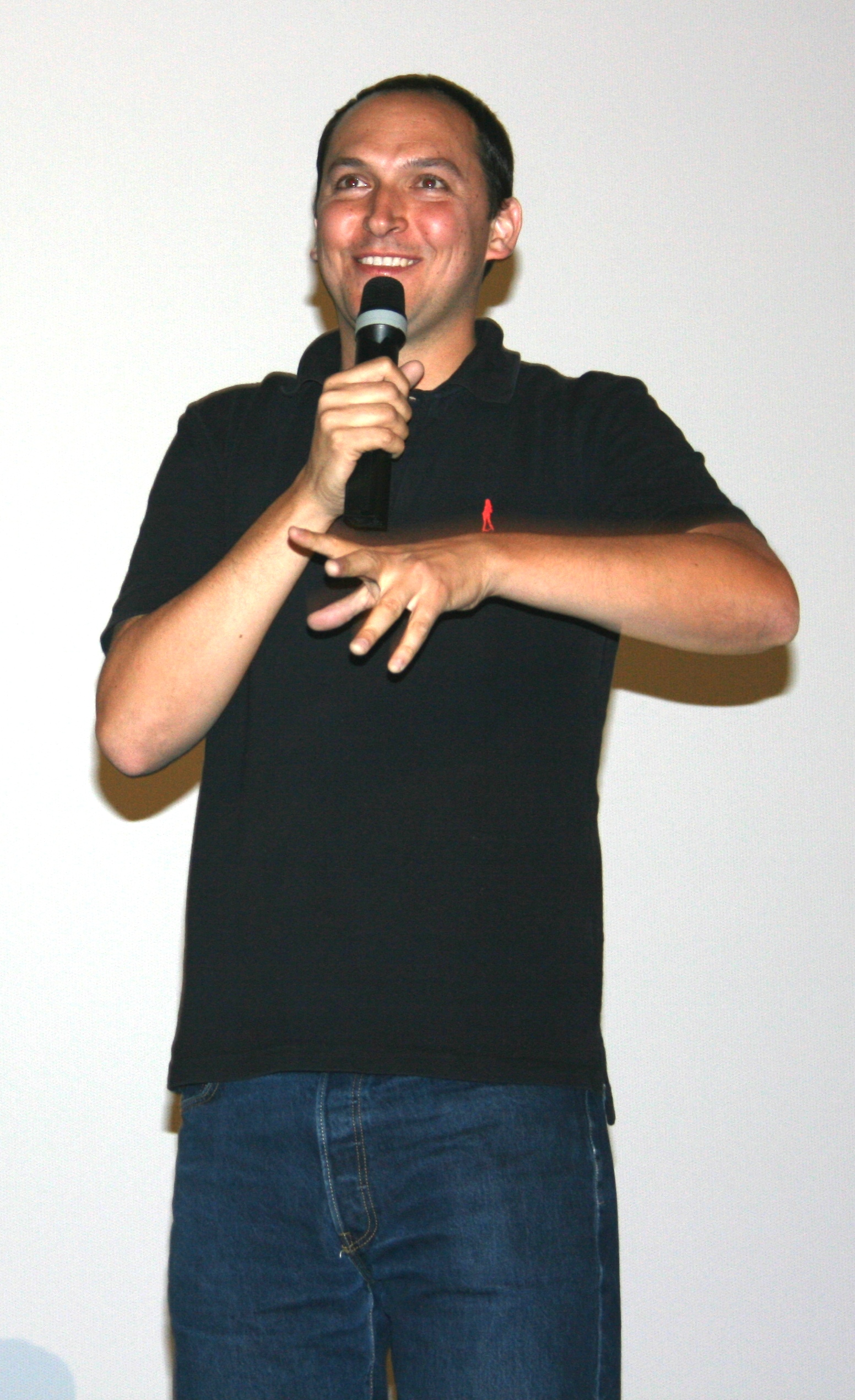
Louis Leterrier promoting the film in Paris in July 2008

"We know the Hulk from 2003 didn't satisfy the fans, and we had to acknowledge that. We emphasized the passion that fans still have for this character and that this is the movie people have always wanted."

— Stephanie Sperber, executive vice-president of Universal Studios Partnerships

Effort was made to promote the story as having a romance and a physical antagonist, and the title was used for promotional puns (such as 7-Eleven's "Incredible Gulp" Slurpees, and "Incredible Dad" themed Father's Day gifts at Kmart). Burger King also promoted the film, and General Nutrition Centers used the title character as a role model for strength training. Hasbro created the toy line, which they released on May 3, 2008. Sega released two tie-in video games on June 5, 2008; a version for consoles and personal computers was developed by Edge of Reality, while a handheld version for the Nintendo DS was developed by Amaze Entertainment. The film was promoted in an episode of American Gladiators on June 9, 2008, which was hosted by Hulk Hogan and featured Lou Ferrigno.

Following the editing dispute between Norton and Leterrier, Universal's Adam Fogelson and Norton planned a promotional tour that would avoid constant media interviews and therefore uncomfortable questions. Norton attended the premiere, took part in a Jimmy Kimmel Live! sketch, and would also promote the film in Japan. However, during the film's release he chose to do charity work in Africa.

== Release ==
=== Theatrical ===
The Incredible Hulk premiered on June 8, 2008, at the Gibson Amphitheatre in Universal City, California and was released in theaters on June 13 in the United States, where it opened in 3,505 theaters. The film is part of Phase One of the MCU. The Incredible Hulk was formatted and screened in IMAX for the first time on August 30, 2018, as part of Marvel Studios' 10 year anniversary IMAX festival.

=== Home media ===
The Incredible Hulk was released by Universal Studios Home Entertainment on Blu-ray and DVD on October 21, 2008. It includes behind-the-scenes featurettes, audio commentary, deleted scenes, and an alternate opening.

The film was also collected in a 10-disc box set titled "Marvel Cinematic Universe: Phase One – Avengers Assembled" which includes all of the Phase One films in the Marvel Cinematic Universe. It was released by Walt Disney Studios Home Entertainment on April 2, 2013. Universal released the film on Ultra HD Blu-ray on April 10, 2018. The Incredible Hulk began streaming on Disney+ in the United States on June 16, 2023, after the distribution rights to the film reverted to Marvel Studios and Disney from Universal.

== Reception ==
=== Box office ===
The Incredible Hulk grossed $134.8 million in the United States and Canada, and $130 million in other territories, for a worldwide total of $265 million. The film, which cost more than $200 million including a production budget of $150 million and marketing costs, barely passed the box office of its predecessor which cost less and was deemed a commercial failure. It was considered to be a success, albeit on a smaller scale than Iron Man. Marvel and Universal both expressed happiness with the film's financial performance. Entertainment analyst David Davis explained that the first film was seen as a commercial failure due to its high expectations while Marvel was able to downplay expectations for this film, especially after the success of Iron Man. Davis said The Incredible Hulk "overdelivered, relative to its underpromise".

The Incredible Hulk earned $55.4 million in its opening weekend, becoming the top film at the box office. Behind Fantastic Four: Rise of the Silver Surfer, it was the second-highest gross for a film released over the Father's Day weekend. This surpassed industry expectations of a $45 million opening, following the disappointing response to the 2003 film. Universal believed word of mouth would contribute to the film breaking even eventually.

The Incredible Hulk also opened in 38 other countries, adding $31 million to the total opening. The film outgrossed the 2003 film in South Korea, while its openings in Mexico and Russia created records for Universal. The film grossed 24 million yuan (roughly $3.4 million) in its Chinese opening on August 26, outgrossing the previous film's overall gross of 10 million yuan.

=== Critical response ===
On review aggregator Rotten Tomatoes, 68% of 238 critics gave a positive review and the average of rated reviews was 6.4/10. The critics consensus reads, "The Incredible Hulk may not be quite the smashing success that fans of Marvel's raging behemoth might hope for, but it offers more than enough big green action to make up for its occasionally puny narrative." Metacritic, which uses a weighted average, assigned a score of 61 out of 100 based on 38 critics, indicating "generally favorable" reviews. The critical response was described as an improvement over that of the 2003 film, although the Rotten Tomatoes score was only a little higher for The Incredible Hulk. Reuters reported that it received "slightly better reviews" than the previous film. Audiences polled by CinemaScore gave the film an average grade of "A−" on an A+ to F scale.

Todd McCarthy of Variety said, "what seemed, in theory, the least-necessary revival of a big screen superhero emerges as perfectly solid summer action fare in The Incredible Hulk." He emphasized "it's all par-for-the-course cinematic demolition and destruction, staged efficiently and with a hint of enthusiasm," and "penned with sporadic wit [...] Visuals lean toward the dark and murky, but editing by three—actually six—hands is fleet, and Craig Armstrong's ever-present score is simultaneously bombastic and helpfully supportive of the action. Effects are in line with pic's generally pro but not inspired achievements." Rene Rodriguez of The Miami Herald applauded that the film "does a lot of things [Ang] Lee's Hulk didn't: it's lighter and faster-paced, it's funnier and it embraces (instead of ignoring) the 1970s TV series that furthered the character's popularity". Mark Rahner of The Seattle Times wrote that, "The relaunch of Marvel's green goliath is an improvement over director Ang Lee's ponderous 2003 Hulk in nearly every way – except that the actual Hulk still looks scarcely better than something from a video game, and he still barely talks". Roger Ebert was not a fan of the film stating, "The Incredible Hulk is no doubt an ideal version of the Hulk saga for those who found Ang Lee's Hulk too talky, or dare I say, too thoughtful. But not for me. It sidesteps the intriguing aspects of Hulkdom and spends way too much time in, dare I say, noisy and mindless action sequences."

Christy Lemire of the Associated Press found that "the inevitable comparisons to Iron Man, Marvel Studios' first blockbuster this summer, serve as a glaring reminder of what this Hulk lacks: wit and heart. Despite the presence of Edward Norton, an actor capable of going just as deep as Robert Downey Jr., we don't feel a strong sense of Bruce Banner's inner conflict". A.O. Scott of The New York Times opined, "'The Adequate Hulk' would have been a more suitable title. There are some big, thumping fights and a few bright shards of pop-cultural wit, but for the most part this movie seems content to aim for the generic mean". David Ansen of Newsweek wrote, "Leterrier has style, he's good with action and he's eager to give the audience its money's worth of bone-crunching battles. Still, once the movie leaves the atmospheric Brazilian settings, nothing in this "Hulk" sinks in deeply: its familiar genre pleasures are all on the surface. ... The movie's scene stealer is Tim Blake Nelson, making a comically welcome third act appearance as the unethical but madly enthusiastic scientist Samuel Sterns". Fionnuala Halligan of Screen Daily called the film "an effects-laden spectacular with a respected, Oscar-nominated actor which culminates in a massive CGI monster mash on the streets of Manhattan," and notes that "[A]lthough Edward Norton tries hard to shade it, Hulk is at heart an extended set-up for two cartoonish monsters to slam each other around Manhattan like a CGI version of a WWF match."

=== Accolades ===
Accolades received by The Incredible Hulk
Award	Date of ceremony	Category	Recipient	Result	Ref.
National Movie Awards	September 8, 2008	Best Superhero Film	The Incredible Hulk	Nominated	
National Movie Awards	September 8, 2008	Best Performance – Male	Edward Norton	Nominated	
Saturn Awards	June 25, 2009	Best Science Fiction Film	The Incredible Hulk	Nominated	
Scream Awards	October 18, 2008	Best Fantasy Movie	The Incredible Hulk	Nominated	
Scream Awards	October 18, 2008	Best Fantasy Actor	Edward Norton	Nominated	
Scream Awards	October 18, 2008	Best Superhero	Edward Norton	Nominated	
Scream Awards	October 18, 2008	Best Remake	The Incredible Hulk	Nominated	
Scream Awards	October 18, 2008	Best Comic Book Movie	The Incredible Hulk	Nominated	
Scream Awards	October 18, 2008	Best Line	"Hulk Smash"	Nominated	
Teen Choice Awards	August 4, 2008	Choice Summer Movie: Action	The Incredible Hulk	Nominated	

== Future ==
=== Further MCU appearances ===
Mark Ruffalo, Leterrier's first choice for Banner, replaced Norton as Banner / Hulk in the MCU beginning in The Avengers, after Feige said he chose not to bring back Norton. He explained: "Our decision is definitely not one based on monetary factors, but instead rooted in the need for an actor who embodies the creativity and collaborative spirit of our other talented cast members. The Avengers demands players who thrive working as part of an ensemble". Norton felt this statement was "cheap". In October 2014, Norton claimed he chose never to play Hulk again because he "wanted more diversity" with his career, and did not want to be associated with only one character. Ruffalo also portrayed the character in Avengers: Age of Ultron (2015), Thor: Ragnarok (2017), Avengers: Infinity War (2018), Avengers: Endgame (2019), and Spider-Man: Brand New Day (2026). Ruffalo said Banner was able to have a more prominent role in Ragnarok, Infinity War, and Endgame because of the lack of a standalone Hulk film, with the character's arc across those films "feel[ing] like a Hulk movie". Ruffalo also made appearances in mid- and post- credits scenes of Iron Man 3 (2013), Captain Marvel (2019), Shang-Chi and the Legend of the Ten Rings (2021), and Avengers Endgame: Encore (2026).

Hurt first reprised his role as Thaddeus Ross in Captain America: Civil War (2016). Ruffalo and Roth both reprised their roles in the Disney+ series She-Hulk: Attorney at Law (2022). Roth also provided uncredited vocals for Abomination in Shang-Chi and the Legend of the Ten Rings. Nelson and Tyler reprised their respective roles as Samuel Sterns and Betty Ross in Captain America: Brave New World (2025), while Harrison Ford was cast as Thaddeus Ross in Brave New World in the wake of Hurt's death in 2022.

=== Potential sequel ===
In March 2008, Norton said "a lot" was left out of the film because it had been envisioned as multiple parts, with this film "intended as chapter one". Leterrier made the film's final shot of Banner ambiguous; the thought being if there was a sequel, it would mean Banner finally masters control over his anger; if there was not a sequel, the shot indicated instead that he becomes a menace in The Avengers. Leterrier had also intended for a scene in the credits showing Blonsky, human once more, imprisoned and chained in a box, with Feige originally having an idea that the character would be locked in a steel vault that would have been sunk to the bottom of the ocean. The character of Samuel Sterns, played by Tim Blake Nelson, was introduced to set him up as a villain in a possible future film, where he would become the Leader. Aaron Sims, the lead designer on The Incredible Hulk, also took time to work on concepts for the Leader. Ty Burrell was also interested in portraying Doc Samson more faithfully to how he appears in the comics.

Leterrier and Roth were originally contracted to return. Leterrier also stated Norton was not signed on, but in October, Hurd stated that Norton was contracted to reprise the role. The film had outgrossed its predecessor and Universal indicated interest in a sequel, though Leterrier believed a sequel would not be made because of the film's box office return. Feige said the film met Marvel's expectations and that Hulk would return, but after The Avengers. Hurd was not concerned that a sequel may not be produced until at least 2012, citing the positive reception to the film and having produced the Terminator series, the second and third film of which had a 12-year gap. Leterrier, after having previously said he did not want to direct a sequel, said in late 2009 he had changed his mind and was now amenable. In October 2010, Marvel Television announced the development of a Hulk television series for ABC, which was planned to explore more of Banner's relationship with Betty Ross at the very beginning of the Hulk's existence. Feige said the series could ultimately link up with the films, but the project was eventually shelved by November 2013.

In April 2012, despite Ruffalo being on board to play the Hulk in the sequel, Feige confirmed that Marvel had no plans at that time to film another Hulk film. In a Q&A session, Feige and Ruffalo confirmed that discussions were underway to produce another Hulk film due to the positive audience response to Ruffalo's performance in The Avengers. In September, Feige, while exploring all possible story options for a sequel film, including a film based on the "Planet Hulk" and "World War Hulk" storylines, stated all stories from the comics were "on the table" and that the character could "carry a movie and be as entertaining" as he was in The Avengers. He added that Marvel Studios would not consider a sequel until after Age of Ultron.

In June 2014, Ruffalo said he believed the studio might be considering doing a new standalone Hulk film, saying, "I think they are, for the first time, entertaining the idea of it. When we did The Avengers it was basically 'No!', and now there is some consideration for it. But there's still nothing definitive, not even a skeletal version of what it would be". In July, Feige stated that the studio was not considering a "Planet Hulk" film at that time, due to wanting to feature Ruffalo's Banner in the film. However, he did not rule out a story that saw the Hulk and Banner end up in space and explained why a solo Hulk film did not occur in Phase Two of the MCU by saying the studio wanted to "save" one of the original Avengers characters for just the Avengers films, with the others appearing in their own solo films (Iron Man, Thor, and Captain America) or the films of others (Black Widow and Nick Fury in Captain America: The Winter Soldier). In October, again on a solo film, Feige said, "We'll see. We'd love to do it, we'd love to find the place to put it", but that the character would make appearances in other character's films in Phase Three. In August 2022, Ruffalo noted there had been conversations around exploring the two-year time period of Hulk arriving on Sakaar, as well as how Banner and Hulk were able to integrate to become Smart Hulk. He was also open to adapting more of Planet Hulk or World War Hulk, which he said the fans were hoping to see.

In April 2015, Ruffalo said Universal holding the distribution rights to Hulk films may be an obstacle to releasing a future Hulk standalone film, and later reiterated this in October, and July 2017. Marvel regained the film production rights for the character in February 2006, but Universal retained the distribution rights for The Incredible Hulk as well as the right of first refusal to pick up the distribution rights to each of any future Marvel-produced Hulk films. According to The Hollywood Reporter, a potential reason why Marvel had not reacquired the film distribution rights to the Hulk as they did with Paramount Pictures for the Iron Man, Thor, and Captain America films is that Universal holds the theme park rights to several Marvel characters that Marvel's parent company, Disney, wants for its own theme parks. In December, Ruffalo stated that the strained relationship between Marvel and Universal may be another obstacle to releasing a future standalone Hulk film. MCU director James Gunn expressed interest in doing a film featuring both Hulk and Red Hulk, but the project never entered development due to conflicts with Universal; Red Hulk first appears in the MCU in Brave New World.

By August 2022, reports believed it was possible Marvel Studios would regain the distribution rights to the character from Universal in 2023. This was due to U.S. Securities and Exchange Commission filings from Marvel Entertainment that indicated Universal had agreed to distribute The Incredible Hulk under the same terms Marvel agreed to with Paramount, which held distribution rights for 15 years from its first release. In March 2023, Citigroup financial analyst Jason Bazinet felt Disney may try to include the distribution rights to Hulk, as well as Namor, in any potential sale of the streaming service Hulu to Comcast, the owner of Universal Pictures through NBCUniversal. The distribution rights to The Incredible Hulk returned to Marvel Studios and Disney by June 15, 2023. In August 2023, Leterrier revealed a potential sequel had considered featuring Hulk's Grey Hulk persona as well as multiple Red Hulks. In February 2024, Ruffalo expressed doubt over the likelihood of making a standalone Hulk film, citing the cost of the CGI required for the character as a reason. In July 2026, Brand New Day director Destin Daniel Cretton said that Ruffalo had developed several pitches for a standalone Hulk film.

== See also ==
- "What If... the World Lost Its Mightiest Heroes?", an episode of the MCU television series What If...? that reimagines some events of this film
