= Idril =

Idril may refer to:

- Idril Celebrindal, a pivotal character in "The Fall of Gondolin" story within J. R. R Tolkien's legendarium.
- a supporting non player character in the 2017 video game Middle-earth: Shadow of War.
- Idrial, a playable character in the 2004 video game The Lord of the Rings: The Third Age.
