= The Incredible Hulk (2008 video game) =

2008 video game

- Developer: Edge of Reality
- Publisher: Sega
- Directors: Rob Cohen; Mark Nau
- Producer: Gabriel Jones
- Designer: Rob Brown
- Programmers: Jacob Meakin; Dave Barrett
- Artists: Alan Johnson; Billy Sullivan; Jason Moulton; Tom Papadatos
- Composers: Mark Griskey; Scott Snyder
- Platforms: Microsoft Windows, PlayStation 2, PlayStation 3, Wii, Xbox 360
- Release: June 5, 2008: Xbox 360; NA: June 5, 2008; AU: June 12, 2008; EU: June 13, 2008; PlayStation 3; NA: June 5, 2008; EU: June 20, 2008; AU: June 26, 2008; Wii; NA: June 5, 2008; AU: July 3, 2008; EU: July 4, 2008; PlayStation 2; NA: June 5, 2008; EU: July 11, 2008; AU: July 17, 2008; Windows; NA: June 12, 2008; EU: June 27, 2008; AU: July 3, 2008
- Genre: Action-adventure
- Mode: Single-player

The Incredible Hulk is a 2008 video game published by Sega and developed by Edge of Reality for the Xbox 360, PlayStation 3, Wii, PlayStation 2, and Microsoft Windows. The game, based on the film of the same name, follows scientist Bruce Banner as he defends himself from the military and the Enclave organization while searching for a cure to a condition that transforms him into a monstrous being known as the Hulk. The game takes place in an open world recreation of Manhattan, and the Hulk has a variety of attacks and abilities for destroying enemies and causing environmental destruction. Apart from the main story, there are numerous mini-games and collectibles that can unlock new content.

The Incredible Hulk resulted from a deal between Marvel Entertainment and Sega that granted the publisher the rights to video game adaptations of films in the Marvel Cinematic Universe. The game was influenced by the previous Hulk title The Incredible Hulk: Ultimate Destruction, and features an explorable recreation of Manhattan as well as the voice talents of the film's stars. The Incredible Hulk received mixed reviews; while the gameplay aspect of engaging in city-wide destruction was enjoyed and the unlockable content and the Hulk's character model were commended, the repetitive missions, weak storyline, flat voice-acting, and numerous graphical flaws were criticized.

== Gameplay ==
The main character using a piece of wall as a shield to block bullets being fired by a HMMWV.

The Incredible Hulk is an action-adventure game in which the player controls the Hulk in an open world recreation of Manhattan. The Hulk has various attacks and abilities that unlock and improve as the player progresses through the game and completes specific tasks (for example, jumping a certain distance or defeating a certain amount of enemies). The HUD features indicators of health and rage. The Hulk can regenerate any health lost from enemy attacks and refill health by collecting green canisters. Rage increases when the Hulk inflicts environmental damage and attacks enemies; if he is attacked, it is also possible to replenish rage by collecting red canisters. The Hulk can perform more powerful attacks requiring a certain amount of rage.

All objects and buildings in the city are destructible, and their fragments can be used as weapons and devices; for example, a pole can be used as a spear, and wall fragments can be used as a shield. Causing destruction attracts the attention of the military, who will attack the Hulk with weapons and machinery. The Hulk's threat level, which is displayed on the HUD, increases as the Hulk causes more destruction. This results in the military using more powerful and sophisticated equipment, such as armored vehicles, tanks, helicopters, and Hulkbuster robots; the highest threat level beckons Tony Stark clad in his Hulkbuster armor.

Various tasks and collectibles can be found throughout the city. The main missions to complete the game involve searching for a cure for Bruce Banner, confronting the military, and fighting the Enclave organization. In addition to the story-based missions, some minigames involve such objectives as running through checkpoints in a limited time or playing darts; for their successful completion, a gold, silver, or bronze medal is given depending on the result. Icons depicting landmark buildings can be obtained by destroying the buildings in which they are contained. Obtaining collectibles, completing main and side missions, and accomplishing other achievements unlocks comic book covers and cosmetic skins.

== Plot ==
Dr. Bruce Banner is a scientist who became a fugitive after gamma radiation exposure afflicted him with a condition that causes him to transform into a savage beast known as the Hulk whenever he is angry or stressed. In Brazil, Banner evades the forces of Emil Blonsky – a soldier serving under General Thunderbolt Ross – and arrives in Manhattan as the Hulk. He saves the life of Rick Jones, a teenager who had been captured by soldiers working for an organization led by scientists called the Enclave. Its four leaders, each with their private army, use Manhattan as a giant test site. Subsequently, the Hulk further protects Rick, and the two become friends. Banner soon starts working with Dr. Samuel Sterns, who had been his contact in Brazil. Under Sterns' direction, the Hulk retrieves special nanites for his research.

The Hulk fends off further military attacks led by the unscrupulous Major Glenn Talbot and assists Rick in thwarting several attacks on the city and schemes perpetrated by the Enclave. Sterns informs Banner that a Gamma Charger can be built to cure him, and the Hulk successfully acquires the items needed to assemble it. Banner heads to the university to retrieve his old research data; however, General Ross's daughter Betty obtains it before her father deletes it. When General Ross's soldiers grab Betty, Bruce turns into the Hulk and attacks the army's deployment points. Hulk then fights with Blonsky, who has received treatment that enhances his physical capabilities. Hulk manages to defeat him and escapes with Betty. At Betty's request, the Hulk secretly helps her father attack the Enclave. Sterns tells the Hulk that they can test the Gamma Charger if the Hulk can obtain a genetic simulator from the Enclave. The Hulk uses the Gamma Charger to disable an Enclave bio-weapon, leading Sterns to conclude that the cure works.

The Hulk then has to guard a truck containing an experimental weapon that General Ross is having transported. When Talbot steals the weapon, Hulk retrieves it and gives it to Rick so he can destroy it. When Talbot has Betty kidnapped, Hulk fights a Hulkbuster machine to destroy the generators trapping her in a cage. Once the Hulkbuster pilot sees who he has kidnapped, he orders his troops to retreat. General Ross sends his troops to arrest Talbot, who is piloting a special nuclear-powered Hulkbuster. The Hulk joins the fight and defeats Talbot, whose Hulkbuster explodes. Despite everything Banner has done to help, General Ross still captures him and takes him and Betty away. During this time, Blonsky forces Sterns to inject him with Banner's gamma-irradiated blood, transforming him into the monstrous Abomination, who then rampages through the city. Banner, seeing that he is the only one who can stop the Abomination, jumps from a helicopter and transforms into the Hulk. After a lengthy battle, the Hulk defeats the Abomination and flees the city, for which Betty holds her father responsible.

== Development and release ==
On April 18, 2007, Sega and Marvel Entertainment announced that they had agreed to terms granting Sega the rights to video game adaptations of the upcoming Marvel Cinematic Universe films Incredible Hulk, Thor, and Captain America: The First Avenger, with the Incredible Hulk game's release coinciding with that of the film in June 2008. The terms were an extension of a deal signed between the two companies which had granted Sega the video game adaptation rights to Iron Man. The console versions were developed by Edge of Reality, while a version for the Nintendo DS was developed by Amaze Entertainment.

Development on The Incredible Hulk was led by Edge of Reality CEO Rob Cohen and Mark Nau, who respectively served as technical and creative directors. It was respectively designed and programmed by Rob Brown and Jacob Meakin. The game runs on the Havok game engine and FMOD audio engine; the former was programmed by Dave Barrett. According to Marvel executive Justin Lambros, the decision to create an open-world game based on the Incredible Hulk film was influenced by The Incredible Hulk: Ultimate Destruction, which was positively received for its open-world gameplay but sold less copies than its predecessor Hulk due to its lack of a film tie-in. Alan Johnson served as the game's art director, with Billy Sullivan as the lead artist, Jason Moulton as the lead environmental artist, and Tom Papadatos as the lead character artist. Using a 3D model of Manhattan provided by EarthData International, approximately 85 percent of the city was recreated for the game, with real-life landmarks such as Times Square and Central Park being implemented. The game additionally incorporates references to other properties by Marvel, including the Baxter Building and advertisements for the Daily Bugle. The Xbox 360 and PlayStation 3 versions respectively feature exclusive unlockable skins based on the Hulk's "Joe Fixit" and "Green Scar" personas. For the PlayStation 2 and Wii versions, the graphics were degraded and the destruction effects were simplified; in addition, the Wii version features a unique control scheme to accommodate the Wii Remote and Nunchuk.

The music was composed by Mark Griskey, who composed the music for the Iron Man video game as well as the trailer for the 2003 Hulk film. The score was recorded in the Seattle-based Studio X and performed by a 65-piece orchestra, and includes electric guitars and electronic elements. Griskey described his score for The Incredible Hulk as "more primal in nature and a lot darker than the music from Iron Man's somewhat heroic score". Griskey's work for the Hulk trailer proved useful in the creation of the game's main theme; Griskey initially took a more straightforward orchestral approach, but Edge of Reality felt that the theme lacked weight. When Edge of Reality voiced their approval of the trailer score's direction, Griskey incorporated some of its elements, such as a prominent half-time drum groove, and added an electric guitar performed by Joe Mina. Griskey collaborated with producer Lupo Groinig to create a remix of the theme for the end credits. The game contains approximately 45 minutes of music. Additional music was provided by Scott Snyder.

The casting, production, and editing for the voice-acting were managed by Blindlight. Actors Edward Norton, Liv Tyler, Tim Roth, Tim Blake Nelson, and William Hurt reprised their respective roles from the film, while the Hulk was voiced by Fred Tatasciore. Jon Curry and Michael Gannon respectively voiced Rick Jones and Major Talbot. The Enclave leaders are voiced by Courtenay Taylor, Dave Wittenberg, S. Scott Bullock, and Simbi Khali. The U-Foes – consisting of Vector/Simon Utrecht, X-Ray, Ironclad, and Vapor – were respectively voiced by Bullock, Keith Ferguson, Mitch Lewis, and Rachael MacFarlane. Tony Stark, who may appear to battle the Hulk if his threat level peaks, is voiced by Stephen Stanton.

The Incredible Hulk was revealed and demonstrated at the New York Comic Con on April 18, 2008. It was shipped to stores in North America on June 5, 2008, while the PC version was released on June 12, the day before the film's opening. The game was released in Europe on June 13 for Xbox 360, June 20 for PlayStation 3, June 27 for Windows, July 4 for Wii, and July 11 for PlayStation 2. It was also released in Australia for Xbox 360 on June 12, PlayStation 3 on June 26, Wii and Windows on July 3, and for PlayStation 2 on July 17. On June 19, free downloadable content was released for the Xbox 360 and PlayStation 3 versions that enables online two-player gameplay. Players can choose from five arenas and compete with other players in ranked or unranked matches in which the players must earn points by destroying enemies and opponents.

== Reception ==
Console and PC reception

Aggregate score
Aggregator	Score				
Aggregator	PC	PS2	PS3	Wii	Xbox 360
Metacritic	33/100	50/100	55/100	46/100	55/100

Review scores
Publication	Score				
Publication	PC	PS2	PS3	Wii	Xbox 360
1Up.com	N/A	C−	C+	D+	C+
Eurogamer	N/A	N/A	N/A	N/A	5/10
Game Informer	N/A	N/A	6.75/10	N/A	6.75/10
GameRevolution	N/A	N/A	C	N/A	C
GameSpot	3.5/10	4/10	5.5/10	3.5/10	5.5/10
GameSpy	N/A	N/A	2/5	N/A	2/5
GamesRadar+	2/5	3.5/5	3.5/5	3.5/5	3.5/5
GameZone	N/A	N/A	6/10	5/10	6/10
IGN	5.5/10	5.7/10	6/10	5.7/10	6/10
Official Xbox Magazine (US)	N/A	N/A	N/A	N/A	6.5/10
TeamXbox	N/A	N/A	N/A	N/A	7/10
VideoGamer.com	N/A	N/A	5/10	N/A	5/10

The Xbox 360, PlayStation 3 and PlayStation 2 versions received "mixed or average" reviews, while the Wii and PC versions received "generally unfavorable" reviews, according to the review aggregation website Metacritic.

The gameplay received mixed reviews. Critics derided the missions as repetitive and monotonous, but enjoyed the initial feeling of engaging in environmental destruction, and the implementation of the ability enhancement system was regarded as a success. Hilary Goldstein of IGN considered the campaign to be of a decent length, which he attributed to the large amount of collectibles. Tom McShea of GameSpot complained of tedious and restricting boss battles, singling out the climax as "horrendous". Andrew Reiner of Game Informer criticized the controls, elaborating that "Cheap death sometimes comes from the game not recognizing that you are hitting two buttons together at once", and remarked that "Terrorizing a city is fun, but protecting it from terrorists is a different story altogether". The controls in the Wii version were especially faulted, being said to have been rendered impractical and confusing by the lack of buttons and noted as being frequently unresponsive. Tom Orry of VideoGamer.com drew attention to additional drawbacks such as a problematic camera and poor artificial intelligence. Goldstein criticized the decision to port the degraded Wii version to the PC rather than the Xbox 360 version, which he called "a total disservice to PC gamers". Dan Stapleton of GamesRadar+, reviewing the PC version, recommended against playing the game on a keyboard and mouse due to "clumsy, non-customizable, and often mislabeled" key inputs. Critics often made comparisons to The Incredible Hulk: Ultimate Destruction, noting similar gameplay aspects and deeming the prior game's superiority. Comparisons were also drawn to Crackdown, a contemporary open world action-adventure title that similarly featured a super-powered protagonist.

Assessments of the graphics were also mixed. Goldstein noted that "the Hulk looks good, but the city isn't so spectacular. It's nice that everything can be destroyed, but it's not enough to overcome the rest of the mediocrity". McShea lambasted the graphics as "startlingly incomplete", citing the short draw distance (which he described as "more reminiscent of a post-eruption Pompeii than modern-day New York City"), uneven frame rate, and the game's tendency to crash during particularly hectic action. Sterling McGarvey of GameSpy, as well as Dan Whitehead of Eurogamer and Orry, regarded the Hulk's model as the game's sole visual advantage. McShea and McGarvey were disconcerted by the distorted likenesses of the film's actors, with McShea describing the cutscene models as "look[ing] like they were recently attacked by a hive of killer bees". Whitehead remarked that "everything else looks no better than Ultimate Destruction, and sometimes looks a whole lot worse", and he additionally cited dramatic drops in the frame rate and numerous glitches. Chris Andrien of GameRevolution deemed the graphics mediocre and more comparable to particularly impressive graphics of the previous generation than to contemporary high-definition visuals. Nick Suttner of 1Up.com considered the detail and textural variety to be superior to that of The Incredible Hulk: Ultimate Destruction, but said that the draw distance was worse and the realistic aesthetic was less fitting. Reiner, however, admired the graphics as "a showcase of destruction and mayhem" complemented by "a stunning fireworks-like display of smoke, debris, and bodies flying through the air". Chuck Osborn of Official Xbox Magazine also held the graphical detail in positive regard. The PlayStation 2, Wii and PC versions were heavily criticized for their poor graphical quality and stripped-down details, particularly the shortened draw distance, reduced city population, and weaker destruction effects.

Reactions to the audio were lukewarm. David Chapman of TeamXbox was satisfied with the sound design, but reticent about the music. Goldstein was left with the impression that "little attention was paid to the audio as you can clearly hear when some of the music loops", and remarked that the sound effects "seem like they were dusted off from the vault". Michael Knutson of GameZone considered the music and sound effects "mediocre at best"; Angelina Sandoval of the same publication elaborated that the music "doesn't sound very cinematic and it tends to loop often", and was baffled by the "very minimal" sound effects, opining that the effects from the film could have been used. Critics derided the voice acting for its unenthusiastic performances, which were described as "phoned in". Norton was singled out for his lethargic delivery, with Reiner proclaiming that "Kirsten Dunst needs to hand her "Worst Voice Actor" award over to Edward Norton" and observing that he "accentuates this unintentional camp by channeling a half-awake zombie through his dialogue". McGarvey and Frank Provo of GamesRadar+, however, appreciated the presence of the film actors' voices, and Sandoval felt that "everyone does a good job with the original dialogue", regarding Roth in particular as "brilliant".

The narrative was also negatively received. Goldstein considered the story to be poorly told and the cutscenes badly compressed. McShea dismissed the story as lifeless, and Whitehead stated that the game's "half-hearted attempt to keep the thread of the movie story running through the game" was unsuccessful. Andrien said that "the story here is tepid at best, and – like many a Hollywood blockbuster – it feels forced into the game as an afterthought, rather than as a well thought-out part of the experience". Reiner remarked that the plot "could crack the Top 100 list for mankind's greatest narrative failures, gets more confusing by the second, and somehow manages to be far-fetched even for a comic story". However, Provo approved of the abundance of adversaries and cosmetic skins drawn from the Hulk comics.
