= The Incredible Hulk (Nintendo DS video game) =

2008 video game

- Developer: The Fizz Factor
- Publisher: Sega
- Director: Rodney Gibbs
- Producer: Paul Benjamin
- Designer: Justin Leingang
- Programmer: Jeff Bloom
- Artist: Lance Myers
- Writer: Paul Benjamin
- Composer: Noah Gabriel
- Engine: GameMaker
- Platform: Nintendo DS
- Release: NA: June 5, 2008; AU: June 12, 2008; EU: June 13, 2008
- Genre: Platform
- Modes: Single-player, multiplayer

The Incredible Hulk is a 2008 video game published by Sega and developed by The Fizz Factor for the Nintendo DS. It is based on the film of the same name, following scientist Bruce Banner as he traverses across the Americas in search of a cure to a condition that transforms him into a monstrous being known as the Hulk. Unlike the console game that was concurrently developed and released by Edge of Reality, The Incredible Hulk is presented as a side-scrolling platformer rather than an open world action-adventure title.

The game consists of a 30-level single-player campaign and a local wireless multiplayer mode. To distill and showcase the Hulk's destructive nature, the development team invested in the creation of a new game engine that accommodated fully destructible environments, which affected development time and necessitated additional artists. Reception to The Incredible Hulk was mixed; while reviewers enjoyed the initial feeling of wielding the Hulk's power and appreciated the controls and unlockable content, they criticized the repetitive gameplay and level design and had lukewarm reactions to the visuals, audio, storyline, and multiplayer mode.

== Gameplay ==
An example of gameplay in The Incredible Hulk

The Incredible Hulk is a side-scrolling platformer in which the player controls the Hulk as he traverses through 30 levels spanning Alaska, Brazil, and the United States. The narrative, abridged from that of the console version, follows Bruce Banner as he travels the world for a cure to the condition that transforms him into the Hulk while fending off adversaries who seek to destroy him or misuse his power. The Hulk is capable of using melee attacks and thrown objects to dispatch enemy characters and demolish fully destructive environments, and can also jump upon enemies as well as leap to great heights with the use of a shoulder button. Destroying environmental elements increases a "Gamma Gauge" that allows the Hulk to enter a "Gamma Boost" state when it is filled. In this state, the Hulk emits a circular field that kills and destroys anything in its radius. Gamma Boost can be maintained by continuing to engage in environmental destruction, but will deactivate if the Hulk takes a single hit. Flagpoles and floating satellites can be used to slingshot the Hulk across great distances and break through stronger buildings. The Hulk has seven health points that are depleted by enemy attacks, but can be replenished by collecting first aid kits. The Nintendo DS's touchscreen is dedicated to a radar-like map of the current level, allowing the player to view upcoming hazards and secrets. Hidden within the levels are twenty cosmetic skins based on the Hulk's differing personas in the comic series, such as "Gray Hulk" and "Smart Hulk". The game includes a multiplayer mode accessible via local wireless play; in this mode, players compete to inflict as much damage as possible upon the environment and against enemies.

== Development and release ==
On April 18, 2007, Sega and Marvel Entertainment announced that they had agreed to terms granting Sega the rights to video game adaptations of the upcoming Marvel Cinematic Universe films Incredible Hulk, Thor, and Captain America: The First Avenger, with the Incredible Hulk game's release coinciding with that of the film in June 2008. The terms were an extension of a deal signed between the two companies which had granted Sega the video game adaptation rights to Iron Man. While the version of the game made for consoles was developed by Edge of Reality, the Nintendo DS version was developed by The Fizz Factor, an Austin-based development branch of Amaze Entertainment under the direction of Rodney Gibbs.

Basing their direction on that of the upcoming film, the development team sought to distill and showcase the Hulk's violent nature, placing significant focus on fully destructible environments. Although The Fizz Factor had previously developed numerous game engines to support a variety of genres for the Nintendo DS in both 2D and 3D formats, none of them were built to accommodate destructible environments, which necessitated an extensive engineering period. The game's lead designer, Justin Leingang, was an avid user of the GameMaker engine. Thus, the design team used it to prototype each of the game's levels while the four-person programming team, led by Jeff Bloom, adapted the engine to support fully destructive environments. The team used a PlayStation 2 controller to emulate the Nintendo DS's control scheme, for the use of the touchpad was limited. The average level reached a playable state within two or three days, allowing the team to quickly present the prototypes to Sega while the final engine was being prepared. The programmers leveraged Autodesk Maya for level-building and Lua for scripting, allowing the designers to build levels and script enemies and events themselves while the programmers focused on other features. The team's environmental artist, under Lance Myers's supervision, created a tile-based system for the game's environmental elements depicting a descent from healthy, damaged, and destroyed. To obfuscate the tile-based nature of the environments and avoid a checkerboard appearance, broken elements such as jagged bits of rebar and glass were made to extend beyond a broken tile's boundaries and into adjacent tiles. Additionally, two damaged states were created for each tile that would be randomly generated so that fully destroyed buildings would not look alike. Because the task was more demanding than was anticipated, two other environmental artists were added between the alpha stage to development's end.

Leingang implemented a two-part control scheme that used the X button to amplify the Hulk's punches and jumps, feeling that this control scheme would help connect the player to the Hulk's actions. Sega, while understanding his intent, had reservations with the mechanic concerning its accessibility. Following a protracted deliberation with Sega as well as internal debate, the development team concurred and removed the two-button combinations. Upon the completion of the engine, the designers manually recreated the completed GameMaker levels on the platform. Whereas The Fizz Factor was usually able to present a working prototype of a project on the platform during the pre-production stage, the decision to invest in new technology up front for The Incredible Hulk resulted in the game's first playable build arriving relatively late into production, which tested Sega's patience. The new engine's creation also eroded available time for polishing the game. Producer Paul Benjamin voiced regret for the prolapsed time spent on the engine, suggesting that a more conventional approach with existing technology would have served the needs of The Fizz Factor and Sega more efficiently. The music was composed by Noah Gabriel, while the sound effects were created by Rick and Will Loconto.

The Incredible Hulk shipped to stores in North America on June 5, 2008, an Australian release following on June 12, and a European release on June 13. A playable demo of the first level was released through the DS Download Service on June 23.

== Reception ==
Reception

Aggregate score
Aggregator	Score
Metacritic	50/100

Review scores
Publication	Score
GameSpot	7/10
GamesRadar+	4/10
GameZone	6/10
IGN	5.2/10
PALGN	4.5/10
Pocket Gamer	3/5

The Incredible Hulk received "mixed or average" reviews according to Metacritic. While Tom McShea of GameSpot felt that the general experience of wielding the Hulk's power was stymied in its translation to a handheld console, he concluded that "even with its problems, this is the best Hulk game coming out this year". Louis Bedigian of GameZone was less forgiving, warning that the game's flaws made it a costly investment, and strongly recommended renting the game before making a purchase decision. However, he and Keane Ng of GamesRadar+ derived satisfaction from wielding the Hulk's strength against enemies. Ed Fear of Pocket Gamer expressed a similar sentiment toward the extent of the environments' destructibility, observing that it granted the Hulk a sense of weight and force.

Although McShea considered the levels to be cleverly designed and varied, others regarded them as dull and tedious. Craig Harris of IGN further described them as lazy, elaborating that "levels feel thrown together with very little flair to them, as if a bunch of interns slapped some structures together in a public domain game creator". Ng pointed out that the Hulk's immense power made the restrictive nature of the level design more obvious, pondering "if The Hulk can fly through a building without breaking a sweat, why can he destroy the walls that have windows in them, but not the ones covered in plywood and caution tape?" Bedigian and McShea complimented the game's "sharp and distinctly potent" controls, which reminded Bedigian of the DS version of Spider-Man: Friend or Foe, though McShea felt that the limited move set made combat predictable. Bedigian additionally compared the slingshot mechanic to Donkey Kong Country and the act of using the Gamma Boost to rush through a level to Sonic the Hedgehog, while Kimberley Ellis of PALGN saw the gameplay as being primarily inspired by Contra.

Bedigian and Ng were annoyed by the absence of checkpoints which, combined with the small size of enemy gunfire and infrequency of health pick-ups, resulted in cheap and frustrating deaths. Bedigian added that some enemies fire a continuous stream of bullets, which put the Hulk at a disadvantage due to his lack of long-range attacks. McShea, contrariwise, felt that the enemies were intelligently placed and that the long stretches without opportunities to replenish health provided a surprising and satisfying amount of challenge by requiring the player to exert patience and precision, although he noted that such cautiousness would be uncharacteristic of the Hulk. Fear also enjoyed gauging and dodging combinations of the enemies' different firing patterns.

McShea and Ellis were underwhelmed by the simple and repetitive bosses. The short campaign length was faulted, with Bedigian supposing that "you'll probably be able to finish this game faster than you can watch the movie". The various unlockable skins were appreciated for adding replay value and for their ties to the comic series mythos, although Ellis felt they were superficial and proposed that attaching unique abilities to the skins would have added variety to the gameplay and made them a better inclusion. McShea deemed the multiplayer mode "mildly fun", but acknowledged that its accessibility was affected by the requirement of two cartridges, and felt that the limited move set rendered the mode forgettable. Bedigian and Ellis regarded the multiplayer mode as bare-bones, with Bedigian remarking that "There isn't much a Hulk game can do in the area of multiplayer combat. Thus, it didn't do much."

Harris and Fear considered the graphics average, whereas Ellis and Ng respectively regarded the visuals as "not the prettiest" and "fugly". Bedigian deemed the graphics to be "below PSone-quality", criticizing the character models as small and lacking in detail. While McShea commended the animation as smooth, Harris and Ellis warned of "vicious" slowdown. Fear regarded the audio as equally average, with Harris and Bedigian describing the music as repetitive (although Harris determined the music's quality to be good in itself), and Bedigian dismissing the sound effects as "cheesy". The storyline was deemed to be indistinct, with McShea deciding that it "seems to exist merely as a way to emphasize that Hulk doesn't need motivation to smash things".
