= Williams F1 Team Driver =

2001 video game

Hot Wheels: Williams F1 Team Driver
- Developer(s): KnowWonder
- Publisher(s): THQ
- Platform(s): Microsoft Windows
- Release: 2001
- Genre(s): Racing game
- Mode(s): Single-player

Williams F1 Team Driver, also known as Hot Wheels: Williams F1 Team Driver or Hot Wheels: F1 Racer, is a racing video game developed by KnowWonder and published by THQ in late 2001. In this game, player advance in the ranks from driving go karts to Formula 1600cc, Formula 3, and finally onto Formula One, to allow the player to follow the career path of real F1 driver. The game includes 16 international tracks, as well as a custom track builder.
