= Crushed Baseball =

2004 video game

- Developer(s): Griptonite Games
- Publisher(s): Summitsoft Entertainment
- Platform(s): Game Boy Advance
- Release: August 31, 2004
- Mode(s): Single-player, multiplayer

Crushed Baseball is a 2004 sports video game developed by Griptonite Games and published by Summitsoft Entertainment for the Game Boy Advance. The game is a non-licensed baseball title in which players accumulate "mojo" to perform supernatural and comic abilities on the pitch. Console versions for the PlayStation 2 and GameCube were unreleased following the collapse of the game's original publisher BAM! Entertainment prior to release. Upon release, Crushed Baseball received mixed reviews.

== Gameplay ==
An example of gameplay from Crushed Baseball

The game features three modes: Exhibition Mode, a single-player game featuring a single match against the computer, League Mode, a series of matches playing a team through a baseball season, and Practice mode, which allows players to practice batting and pitching. During gameplay, batters accumulate mojo, a resource that allows players to perform superhuman abilities, which fills up in a meter over time when players strike out an opponent or reach a base. Mojo abilities, when activated, allow the player to use special moves, such as throwing balls that saw through the batter's bat, or hitting balls that plant themselves in the field. Players can earn extra mojo by hitting targeted objects in the background of the pitch. The game features two-player gameplay using the Game Link Cable.

== Development ==
Crushed Baseball was announced by original publisher BAM! Entertainment for release on the PlayStation 2, GameCube, and Game Boy Advance in October 2002 for intended release in March 2003. Early previous of the console games, originally titled Crushed Baseball 2004 promised a cartoonlike 3D visual presentation, with superpowers, playable mascots, and fully interactive ballparks. The publisher experienced financial issues in 2003, leading them to narrow their product strategy and cut costs, including cancelling the development of the Crushed Baseball console titles, and eventually closed and delisted in 2004. The Game Boy Advance version of Crushed Baseball was developed by Griptonite Games, the handheld department of parent company Amaze Entertainment. The developers intended to create a "unique" and fun-focused baseball title, attempting to find a middle ground between young audiences and players expecting a realistic simulation.

== Reception ==
Reception

Review scores
Publication	Score
AllGame	3.5/5
GameSpot	7.3/10
Nintendo Power	1.9/5

Despite an initially positive reaction to the game's announcement, Official US PlayStation Magazine sustained a negative pre-release reception of Crushed Baseball, considering it to be "pointless" and likely to be "baseball's worst on PS2" due to the lack of MLB-licensed content and being slated for release after the season started. Describing Crushed Baseball as a "solid arcade-style baseball video game that ought to appeal to anyone", Frank Provo of GameSpot praised the game's simplicity, "smooth" animations and detailed graphics, although similarly wished the game had licensed players, teams or logos. Nintendo Power considered the graphics to be "sparse" but "crisp", and the gameplay "slow-paced" and "lacking", critiquing the interface for making it "too easy to put the ball into play".
