= Disney's Brother Bear (video game) =

2003 video game

Brother Bear
- Developers: KnowWonder (PC); Vicarious Visions (GBA)
- Publisher: Disney Interactive (Note: THQ published the Game Boy Advance version in Europe.)
- Engine: Unreal Engine 1
- Platforms: Game Boy Advance, Microsoft Windows
- Release: Game Boy Advance: NA: November 4, 2003; PAL: November 21, 2003; Windows: NA: November 11, 2003; PAL: November 28, 2003
- Genres: Action, platformer
- Mode: Single-player

Brother Bear is a 2003 video game based on the 2003 animated film of the same name. It was released on November 4, 2003, for Game Boy Advance, and November 11 for Microsoft Windows.

== Development ==
The PC version is a 3D platform game published by Disney Interactive and released on November 11, 2003.

The Game Boy Advance version was released on November 4, 2003. It is a platforming game that was published by Disney Interactive and developed by Vicarious Visions.

== Reception ==
=== PC version ===
GameZone rated the game 7 out of 10, PC Format UK rated it 27 out of 100, and PC Gamer UK rated it 62 out of 100. Childrenssoftware.com gave the game 4.5/5, writing: "The humor and adventure make the transition from large to small screen nicely. Although the game is marketed to kids ages 6 and older, the gameplay can be challenging. Our nine to fourteen year old testers liked the game". jkdmedia of Gamezone said: "This game appears to be a fun, action packed game, with lots of cool mini-games that can be played independently. I say 'appear', because frankly, due to many technical issues in running the game, we didn't get all the way through the game. There is a lot of game here, though, with plenty of easy exploration and item collecting". SuperKids gave the game a 3.0 for Educational Value, 4.0 for Kid Appeal, and 5.0 for Ease of Use. It said: "While Brother Bear is a fun-packed game that reinforces the importance of friendship and listening, it does not address the classic 3 R's", and noted "even if kids have not seen Disney's Brother Bear movie, they will enjoy this fun adventure".

=== GBA version ===
GameZone rated the game 8 out of 10, Nintendo Power rated it 3.3 out of 5, and Nintendojo rated it 6.6 out of 10.
