= The Totally Techie World of Young Dilbert =

1997 video game

- Publisher(s): KnowWonder
- Platform(s): Windows, Macintosh
- Release: 1997

The Totally Techie World of Young Dilbert: Hi-Tech Hijinks is a 1997 education game for Windows and Macintosh released by KnowWonder, based on the comic strip Dilbert.

== Reception ==
At the time of Young Dilbert's release, a price war between Hasbro Interactive, Mattel Interactive and The Learning Company lowered the prices of their offerings, leaving Young Dilbert unable to commercially compete.
