= The Lord of the Rings: The Third Age (GBA video game) =

2004 video game

- North American cover art
- Developer: Griptonite Games
- Publisher: Electronic Arts
- Platform: Game Boy Advance
- Release: NA: November 2, 2004; PAL: November 5, 2004
- Genres: Turn-based tactics, tactical role-playing
- Modes: Single-player, multiplayer

The Lord of the Rings: The Third Age is a turn-based tactics game for the Game Boy Advance. It was released in 2004 by Electronic Arts and is the handheld version of a role-playing video game of the same name released for GameCube, PlayStation 2 and Xbox.

== Gameplay ==
The Mouth of Sauron commands a force of orcs

When starting a campaign, the player is prompted to choose a commander from either good (Aragorn, Elrond or Gandalf) or evil (Saruman, the Witch-King of Angmar or the Mouth of Sauron). Selecting a commander from either side begins a campaign from the perspective of that army. The player can store two saved games at any given time, one each for good and evil.

Depending on the campaign, a number of secondary heroes are available for use in battle. The good heroes include members of the Fellowship and supporting allies such as Gimli, Théoden, Éomer, Faramir, and Boromir. The evil heroes include a variety of orcs and servants of evil from the films and novel trilogy, such as Grima Wormtongue, Gorbag, Sharku, Ugluk, Grishnakh, Lurtz and Gothmog. As the player completes missions and progresses through the campaign, they are able to use experience points to purchase skills and equipment upgrades in order to enhance the performance of their primary and secondary heroes. The game may be played on "Sauron Mode", whereby heroes who fall in battle are unavailable for the remainder of the campaign.

Isildur is a non-selectable, non-upgradable hero that appears and is playable in the first mission of the good campaign. On the evil campaign, these additional companions include Orc chieftains and captains, Uruk-hai lieutenants and captains, and in a few select missions, the Dark Lord Sauron. Units known as standard-bearers are also occasionally available to either side and add to the command points on a given flank.

The campaign comprises 24 levels in addition to two tutorial levels and six bonus missions. All of the missions in a given episode must be completed to move to the next portion of the trilogy. Several bonus levels and heroes are unlockable by meeting specific conditions while playing the game.

== Reception ==
Reception

Aggregate scores
| Aggregator | Score |
|---|---|
| GameRankings | 74% |
| Metacritic | 67/100 |

Review scores
| Publication | Score |
|---|---|
| Game Informer | 8/10 |
| GamePro | 3/5 |
| IGN | 6/10 |
| NGC Magazine | 3/5 |
| Nintendo Power | 4.1/5 |

The game received "average" reviews, according to video game review score aggregator Metacritic.
