= Amaze Entertainment =

American video game developer

- Type: Subsidiary
- Industry: Video games
- Founded: 1996; 30 years ago
- Founder: Dan Elenbaas
- Defunct: July 2009; 17 years ago
- Fate: Merged with Griptonite Games
- Headquarters: Kirkland, Washington, United States
- Products: Harry Potter (2001–04); The Lord of the Rings (2002–05); The Sims (2003–05); The Chronicles of Narnia: The Lion, the Witch and the Wardrobe (2005); Pirates of the Caribbean (2006–07)
- Number of employees: 250 (2008)
- Parent: Foundation 9 Entertainment (2006–2009)
- Website: Amaze Entertainment (archive)

Amaze Entertainment, formerly KnowWonder, was an American video game developer based in Kirkland, Washington that operated from 1996 to 2009. Initially a developer of children's edutainment titles, they went on to develop video games for several high-profile properties, including Harry Potter, The Lord of the Rings, The Sims, The Chronicles of Narnia, and Pirates of the Caribbean. During its lifespan, it was one of North America's largest independent video game developers. It was acquired by Foundation 9 Entertainment in 2006, and in 2009 was merged with its former subsidiary Griptonite Games.

== History ==
=== KnowWonder (1996–2001) ===
Amaze Entertainment, as KnowWonder, was founded by Dan Elenbaas in 1996 in Kirkland, Washington. The company established itself as a developer of children's edutainment games with its self-published 1997 title The Totally Techie World of Young Dilbert, which was created to help children learn how to use computers. However, at the time of the game's release, a price war between Hasbro Interactive, Mattel Interactive and The Learning Company lowered the prices of their offerings, leaving Young Dilbert unable to compete.

Elenbaas then decided to begin developing for larger publishers, and entered a deal with Microsoft to develop titles based on The Magic School Bus. The first of these titles, The Magic School Bus Explores the World of Animals, was released on April 29, 1999, and KnowWonder would develop a total of seven Magic School Bus titles up to 2001. On May 2, KnowWonder announced that it had signed deals with Microsoft and Mattel to develop products for various digital platforms. On November 1, KnowWonder announced its acquisition of the Seattle division of Realtime Associates.

On January 3, 2000, KnowWonder began production on its first project for the upcoming Xbox console, announcing its development to coincide with the console's unveiling on March 10. To accommodate its growth, KnowWonder moved to a 35,000 square foot facility in February 2000; the office was a few miles away from Microsoft and Nintendo of America. The company's Xbox title, Azurik: Rise of Perathia, was released on November 20, 2001. On November 16, KnowWonder released three video games based on Harry Potter and the Philosopher's Stone to coincide with the film's American premiere.

=== Amaze Entertainment (2002–2009) ===
At the turn of 2001/02, the company was renamed Amaze Entertainment, while the branch responsible for personal computer titles retained the KnowWonder name. On March 12, 2002, Amaze Entertainment acquired Austin, Texas-based developer The Fizz Factor, which was formed from former Human Code employees. In 2003, the KnowWonder studio won the Stevie Award for Best Creative Team in the inaugural American Business Awards. By this time, the company was one of North America's largest independent video game developers, employing around 200 people. In September 2003, it was named the second fastest-growing technology company in Washington by accounting firm Deloitte & Touche.

In 2005, Griptonite Games and The Fizz Factor were absorbed into Amaze Entertainment's network of studios. In November 2006, the company was acquired by Foundation 9 Entertainment (F9E). On July 21, 2008, F9E announced that the Amaze Entertainment brand would be split to promote the autonomy of its three studios; the Griptonite Games and The Fizz Factor brands were reinstated, with the original Kirkland studio retaining the Amaze Entertainment name. At the time, Amaze Entertainment employed over 250 people. In July 2009, F9E announced that, due to a slowdown in the video game industry, it would be closing The Fizz Factor and merging Amaze Entertainment and Griptonite Games. As stated by the company, these measures were aimed to align the company's production capacity with concurrent market conditions and maintain profitability and service quality for its partners and employees.

== Divisions ==
- KnowWonder – After the parent company was renamed Amaze Entertainment, the division responsible for PC productions of popular brands retained the name. The division was headed by Lindsay Gupton. The brand was discontinued in 2005.
- Griptonite Games (formerly Realtime Associates Seattle) – Founded by Steve Ettinger in 1994 and acquired in November 1999 by KnowWonder, this division was responsible for productions and ports for Nintendo handheld consoles. The division was headed by Steven Ettinger, and was sold in August 2011 to Glu Mobile.
- Adrenium Games – Founded in December 1999 in Kirkland, this division was responsible for next-gen productions, i.e. for new-generation consoles. The division was headed by Michael Waite. The brand was discontinued in 2005.
- The Fizz Factor – An Austin, Texas-based studio that was formed from former Human Code employees and acquired on March 12, 2002. The division was headed by Rodney Gibbs and employed approximately 50 people. It closed in July 2009.
- Black Ship Games – A division established in April 2003 specifically for the Asian market that was headed by Scott K. Tsumura and was dissolved in 2005 after releasing its sole title, Digimon Rumble Arena 2.
- Amaze Entertainment – The division took over from KnowWonder and Adrenium Games in 2005, expanding its portfolio to include titles for the PlayStation Portable. Until 2006, Lindsay Gupton was the studio's CEO, and after him, Michael Waite took over. In July 2009, it was consolidated with Griptonite Games.

== Games developed ==
=== As KnowWonder ===
Year	Title	Platform(s)	Studio	Publisher(s)	Notes	Ref.
1997	The Totally Techie World of Young Dilbert	Microsoft Windows, Mac OS	KnowWonder	KnowWonder		
1999	The Magic School Bus Explores the World of Animals	Microsoft Windows, Mac OS	KnowWonder	Microsoft		
1999	Easy-Bake Kitchen	Microsoft Windows	KnowWonder	Hasbro Interactive		
1999	My Interactive Notebook	Microsoft Windows, Mac OS	KnowWonder	The Learning Company		
2000	The Magic School Bus Explores the World of Bugs	Microsoft Windows, Mac OS	KnowWonder	Microsoft		
2000	Heroes of Might and Magic	Game Boy Color	Realtime Associates Seattle	The 3DO Company	Published under the KnowWonder banner	
2000	Totally Angelica Boredom Buster	Microsoft Windows, Mac OS	KnowWonder	Mattel Interactive		
2000	The Magic School Bus in Concert	Microsoft Windows, Mac OS	KnowWonder	Microsoft		
2000	The Magic School Bus Lands on Mars	Microsoft Windows, Mac OS	KnowWonder	Microsoft		
2000	Rugrats in Paris: The Movie	Microsoft Windows	KnowWonder	Mattel Interactive		
2000	HotWheels Slot Car Racing	Microsoft Windows	KnowWonder	Mattel Interactive		
2000	Wild Thornberrys Animal Adventures	PlayStation	KnowWonder	Mattel Interactive		
2000	Heroes of Might and Magic II	Game Boy Color	Realtime Associates Seattle	The 3DO Company	Published under the KnowWonder banner	
2001	The Magic School Bus: Whales & Dolphins	Microsoft Windows, Mac OS	KnowWonder	Microsoft		
2001	The Magic School Bus Discovers Flight	Microsoft Windows, Mac OS	KnowWonder	Microsoft		
2001	The Magic School Bus: Volcano Adventure	Microsoft Windows, Mac OS	KnowWonder	Microsoft		
2001	Power Rangers Time Force	Microsoft Windows	KnowWonder	THQ		
2001	Cluefinders: The Incredible Toy Story	Microsoft Windows, Mac OS	KnowWonder	The Learning Company		
2001	Williams F1 Team Driver	Microsoft Windows	KnowWonder	THQ		
2001	Harry Potter and the Philosopher's Stone	Microsoft Windows, Mac OS	KnowWonder	Electronic Arts		
2001	Harry Potter and the Philosopher's Stone	Game Boy Advance	Griptonite Games	Electronic Arts		
2001	Harry Potter and the Philosopher's Stone	Game Boy Color	Griptonite Games	Electronic Arts		
2001	Azurik: Rise of Perathia	Xbox	Adrenium Games	Microsoft Game Studios		

=== As Amaze Entertainment ===
Year	Title	Platform(s)	Studio	Publisher(s)	Notes	Ref.
2002	Rugrats Munchin Land	Microsoft Windows	KnowWonder	THQ		
2002	Spirit: Stallion of the Cimmaron - Forever Free	Microsoft Windows	The Fizz Factor	THQ		
2002	The Lord of the Rings: The Two Towers	Game Boy Advance	Griptonite Games	Electronic Arts		
2002	Harry Potter and the Chamber of Secrets	Microsoft Windows	KnowWonder	Electronic Arts		
2002	Harry Potter and the Chamber of Secrets	Game Boy Color	Griptonite Games	Electronic Arts		
2003	Daredevil	Game Boy Advance	Griptonite Games	Encore Software, THQ		
2003	Finding Nemo	Microsoft Windows, Mac OS	KnowWonder	THQ		
2003	Finding Nemo: Nemo's Underwater World of Fun	Microsoft Windows, Mac OS	KnowWonder	THQ		
2003	The Hobbit	Microsoft Windows	The Fizz Factor	Sierra Entertainment		
2003	Disney's Brother Bear	Microsoft Windows	KnowWonder	Disney Interactive		
2003	The Lord of the Rings: The Return of the King	Game Boy Advance	Griptonite Games	EA Games		
2003	James Bond 007: Everything or Nothing	Game Boy Advance	Griptonite Games	EA Games		
2003	The Sims Bustin' Out	Game Boy Advance	Griptonite Games	EA Games		
2004	Samurai Jack: The Shadow of Aku	PlayStation 2, GameCube, Xbox	Adrenium Games	Sega		
2004	Digimon Racing	Game Boy Advance	Griptonite Games	Bandai		
2004	Shrek 2	Microsoft Windows	KnowWonder	Activision		
2004	Harry Potter and the Prisoner of Azkaban	Microsoft Windows	KnowWonder	Electronic Arts		
2004	Harry Potter and the Prisoner of Azkaban	Game Boy Advance	Griptonite Games	Electronic Arts		
2004	Spider-Man 2	Microsoft Windows	The Fizz Factor	Activision		
2004	Digimon Rumble Arena 2	PlayStation 2, GameCube, Xbox	Black Ship Games	Bandai		
2004	Crushed Baseball	Game Boy Advance	Griptonite Games	Summitsoft Entertainment		
2004	Shark Tale	Microsoft Windows	KnowWonder	Activision		
2004	The Lord of the Rings: The Third Age	Game Boy Advance	Griptonite Games	Electronic Arts		
2004	Lemony Snicket's A Series of Unfortunate Events	PlayStation 2, GameCube, Xbox	Adrenium Games	Activision		
2004	Lemony Snicket's A Series of Unfortunate Events	Microsoft Windows	KnowWonder	Activision		
2004	Lemony Snicket's A Series of Unfortunate Events	Game Boy Advance	Griptonite Games	Activision		
2004	The Urbz: Sims in the City	Game Boy Advance, Nintendo DS	Griptonite Games	Electronic Arts		
2005	The Lord of the Rings: Tactics	PlayStation Portable	Adrenium Games	Electronic Arts		
2005	Lego Star Wars: The Video Game	Game Boy Advance	Griptonite Games	Eidos Interactive		
2005	Robots	Nintendo DS, Game Boy Advance	Griptonite Games	Vivendi Games		
2005	Star Wars: Revenge of the Sith	Plug and play	Griptonite Games	Jakks Pacific		
2005	The Sims 2	Nintendo DS, Game Boy Advance, PlayStation Portable	Griptonite Games	Electronic Arts	Published under the Amaze Entertainment banner	
2005	The Chronicles of Narnia: The Lion, the Witch and the Wardrobe	Game Boy Advance	Griptonite Games	Buena Vista Games	Published under the Amaze Entertainment banner	
2005	Shrek SuperSlam	Nintendo DS, Game Boy Advance	Griptonite Games	Activision	Published under the Amaze Entertainment banner	
2005	Spyro: Shadow Legacy	Nintendo DS	The Fizz Factor	Vivendi Games	Published under the Amaze Entertainment banner	
2006	Lego Star Wars II: The Original Trilogy	Game Boy Advance, plug and play, Nintendo DS	Griptonite Games	LucasArts, Jakks Pacific	Published under the Amaze Entertainment banner	
2006	Ice Age 2: The Meltdown	Nintendo DS, Game Boy Advance	Griptonite Games	Vivendi Games	Published under the Amaze Entertainment banner	
2006	Marvel X-Men (X-Men: Mutant Reign)	Plug and play	Griptonite Games	Jakks Pacific	Published under the Amaze Entertainment banner	
2006	Pirates of the Caribbean: Dead Man's Chest	Nintendo DS, Game Boy Advance	Griptonite Games	Buena Vista Games	Published under the Amaze Entertainment banner	
2006	Pirates of the Caribbean: Dead Man's Chest	PlayStation Portable	Amaze Entertainment	Buena Vista Games		
2006	Eragon	PlayStation Portable	Amaze Entertainment	Vivendi Games		
2006	Eragon	Nintendo DS, Game Boy Advance	Griptonite Games	Vivendi Games	Published under the Amaze Entertainment banner	
2006	Over the Hedge: Hammy Goes Nuts!	PlayStation Portable	Amaze Entertainment	Activision		
2006	Over the Hedge: Hammy Goes Nuts!	Nintendo DS	The Fizz Factor	Activision	Published under the Amaze Entertainment banner	
2006	X-Men: The Official Game	Nintendo DS	The Fizz Factor	Activision	Published under the Amaze Entertainment banner	
2006	The Legend of Spyro: A New Beginning	Nintendo DS	The Fizz Factor	Vivendi Games	Published under the Amaze Entertainment banner	
2006	Bionicle Heroes	Nintendo DS, Game Boy Advance	Griptonite Games	Eidos Interactive	Published under the Amaze Entertainment banner	
2007	Call of Duty: Roads to Victory	PlayStation Portable	Amaze Entertainment	Activision		
2007	Shrek the Third	PlayStation Portable	Amaze Entertainment	Activision		
2007	WWE Smackdown vs. Raw 2008	Nintendo DS	The Fizz Factor	THQ	Published under the Amaze Entertainment banner	
2007	Pirates of the Caribbean: At World's End	Nintendo DS	Griptonite Games	Disney Interactive Studios	Published under the Amaze Entertainment banner	
2007	Disney Friends	Nintendo DS	Griptonite Games	Disney Interactive Studios	Published under the Amaze Entertainment banner	
2007	Crash of the Titans	Nintendo DS	Griptonite Games	Vivendi Games	Published under the Amaze Entertainment banner	
2007	The Legend of Spyro: The Eternal Night	Nintendo DS, Game Boy Advance	Griptonite Games	Vivendi Games	Published under the Amaze Entertainment banner	
2007	The Simpsons Game	Nintendo DS	Griptonite Games	Electronic Arts	Published under the Amaze Entertainment banner	
2008	Spider-Man: Web of Shadows	Nintendo DS	Griptonite Games	Activision		
2008	Spider-Man: Web of Shadows - Amazing Allies Edition	PlayStation 2, PlayStation Portable	Amaze Entertainment	Activision		
2008	The Incredible Hulk	Nintendo DS	The Fizz Factor	Sega		
2008	The Tale of Despereaux	Nintendo DS	The Fizz Factor	Brash Entertainment		
2008	Looney Tunes: Cartoon Conductor	Nintendo DS	Griptonite Games	Eidos Interactive		
2008	Chimps Ahoy!	IPhone, IPod touch	Griptonite Games	Griptonite Games		
2008	Super Breakout	IPhone, IPod touch	Griptonite Games	Atari SA		
2008	Missile Command	IPhone, IPod touch	Griptonite Games	Atari SA		
2008	Centipede	IPhone, IPod touch	Griptonite Games	Atari SA		
2008	High School Musical 3: Senior Year	Nintendo DS	Griptonite Games	Disney Interactive Studios		
2008	Spore Creatures	Nintendo DS	Griptonite Games	Electronic Arts		
2008	Mystery Case Files: MillionHeir	Nintendo DS	Griptonite Games	Nintendo	Co-production with Big Fish Games	
2008	Ben Stein: It's Trivial	iPhone, iPod Touch	Griptonite Games	Foundation 9 Entertainment		
2008	Age of Empires: Mythologies	Nintendo DS	Griptonite Games	THQ		
2008	Chimps Ahoy! Spooked!	iPhone, iPod Touch	Griptonite Games	Foundation 9 Entertainment		
2008	Neopets Puzzle Adventure	Nintendo DS	Griptonite Games	Capcom		
2008	Madagascar: Escape 2 Africa	Nintendo DS	Griptonite Games	Activision		
2009	Monsters vs. Aliens	Nintendo DS	Griptonite Games	Activision		
2009	X-Men Origins: Wolverine	PlayStation 2, Wii	Amaze Entertainment	Activision		
2009	Indiana Jones and the Staff of Kings	PlayStation Portable	Amaze Entertainment	LucasArts		
2009	Reiner Knizia's Poison	iOS, iPod touch	Griptonite Games	Griptonite Games		
2009	Atari Football	iOS	Griptonite Games	Atari SA		
2009	SpongeBob vs. The Big One: Beach Party Cook-Off	Nintendo DS	The Fizz Factor	THQ		
2009	Night at the Museum: Battle of the Smithsonian	Nintendo DS	The Fizz Factor	Majesco		
2009	Charm Girls Club: My Perfect Prom	Nintendo DS	The Fizz Factor	Electronic Arts		
